= List of Nintendo Entertainment System games =

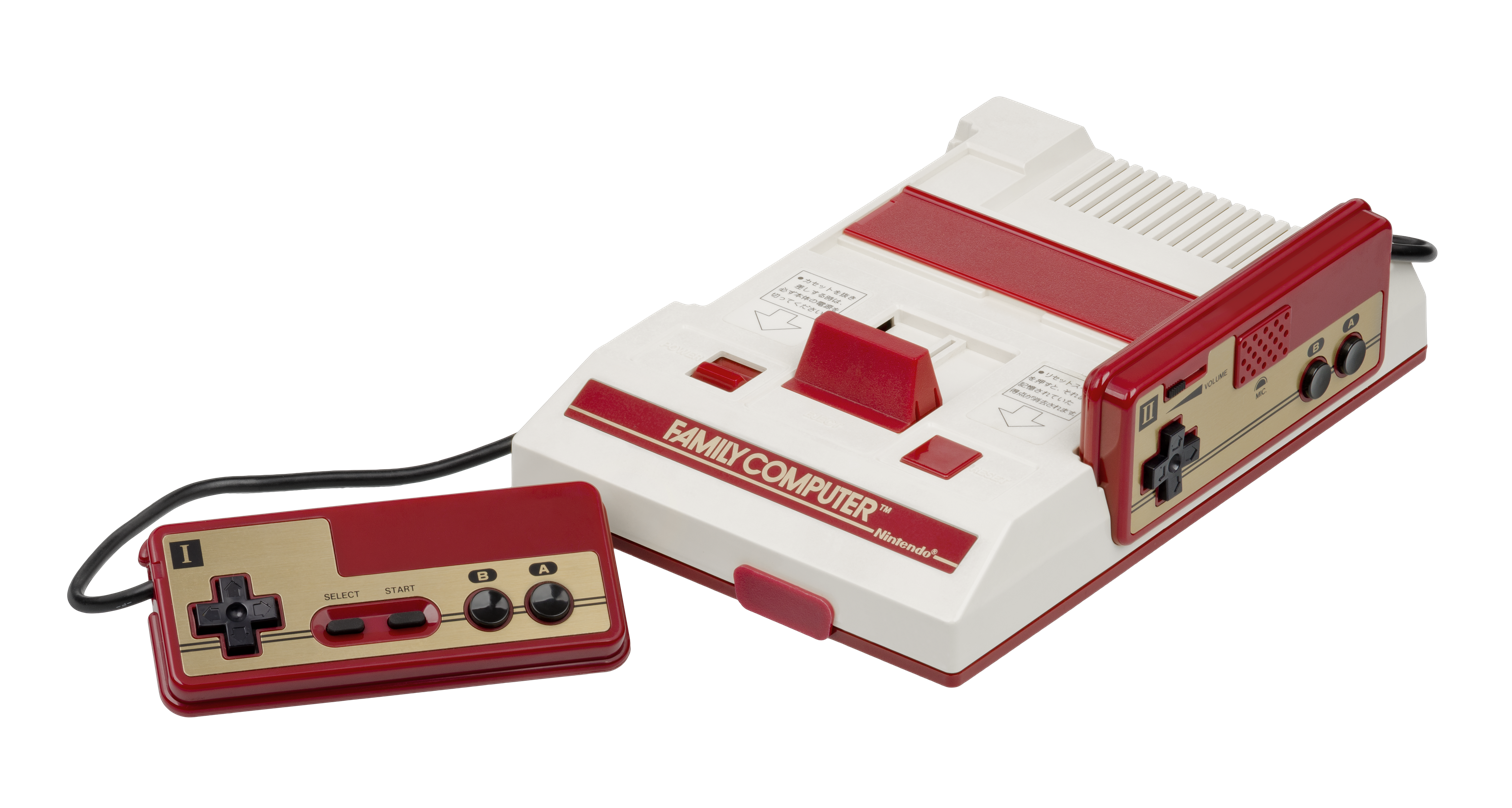
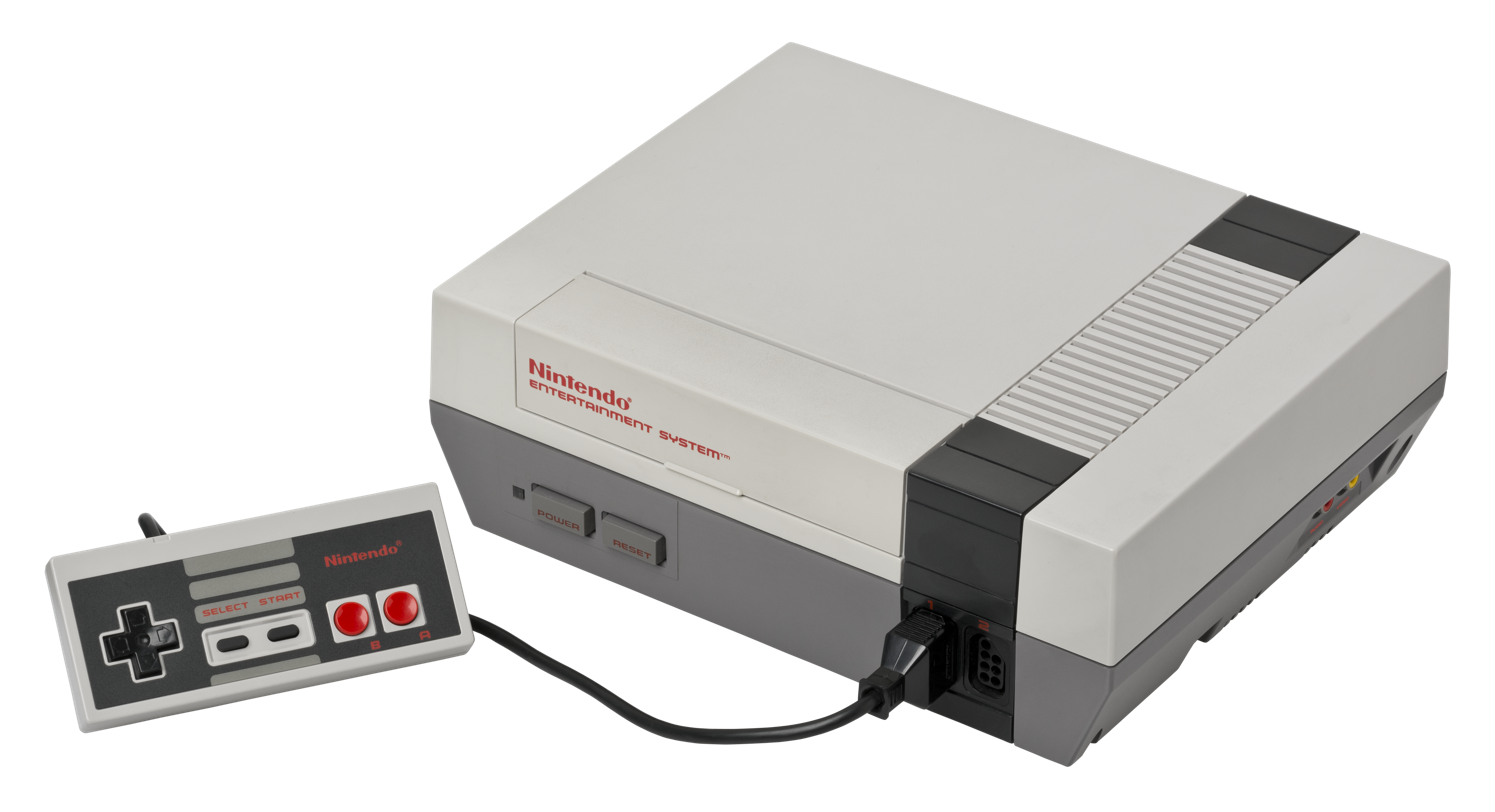
The Japanese Family Computer (Famicom) (top) and international Nintendo Entertainment System (bottom)
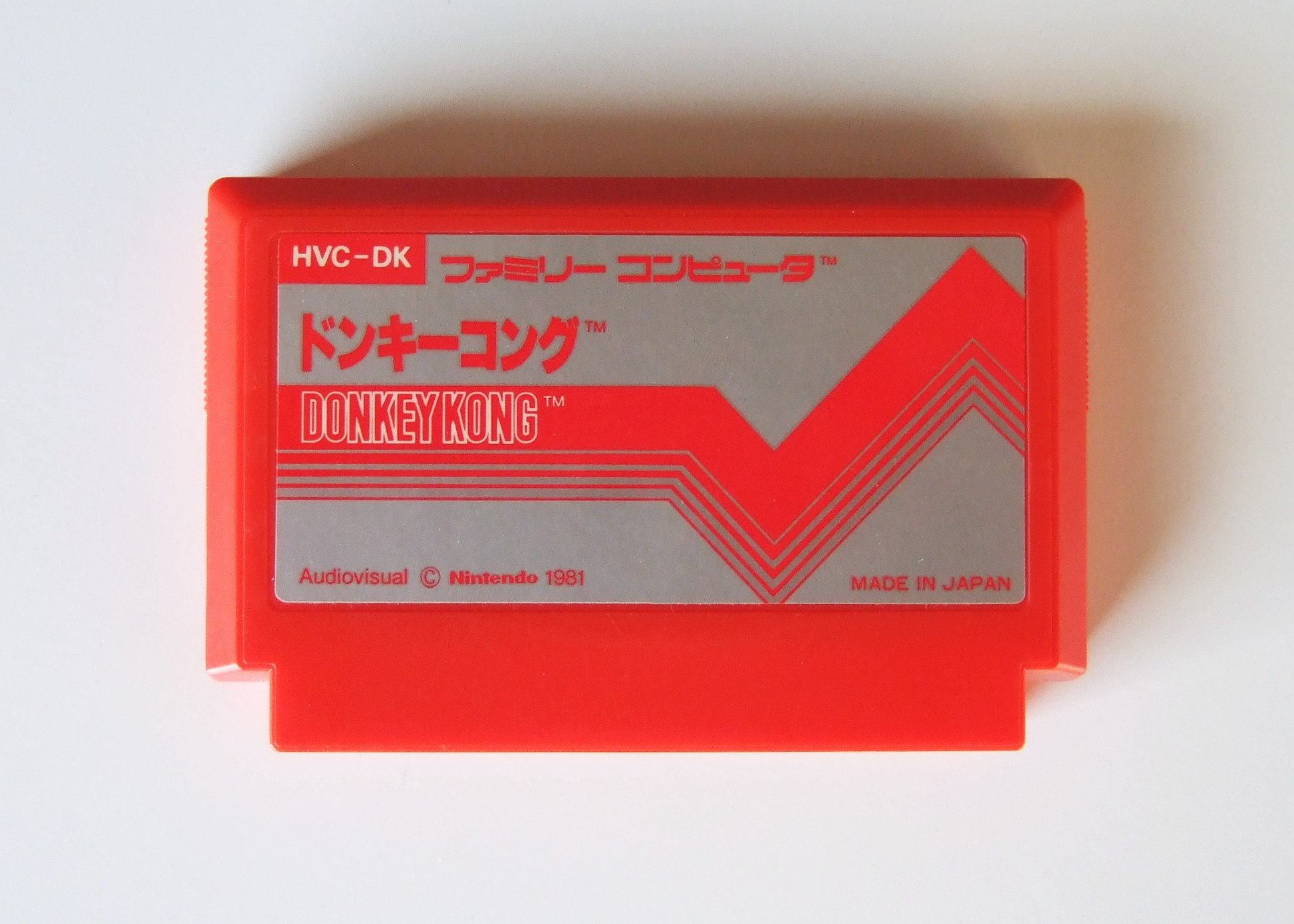

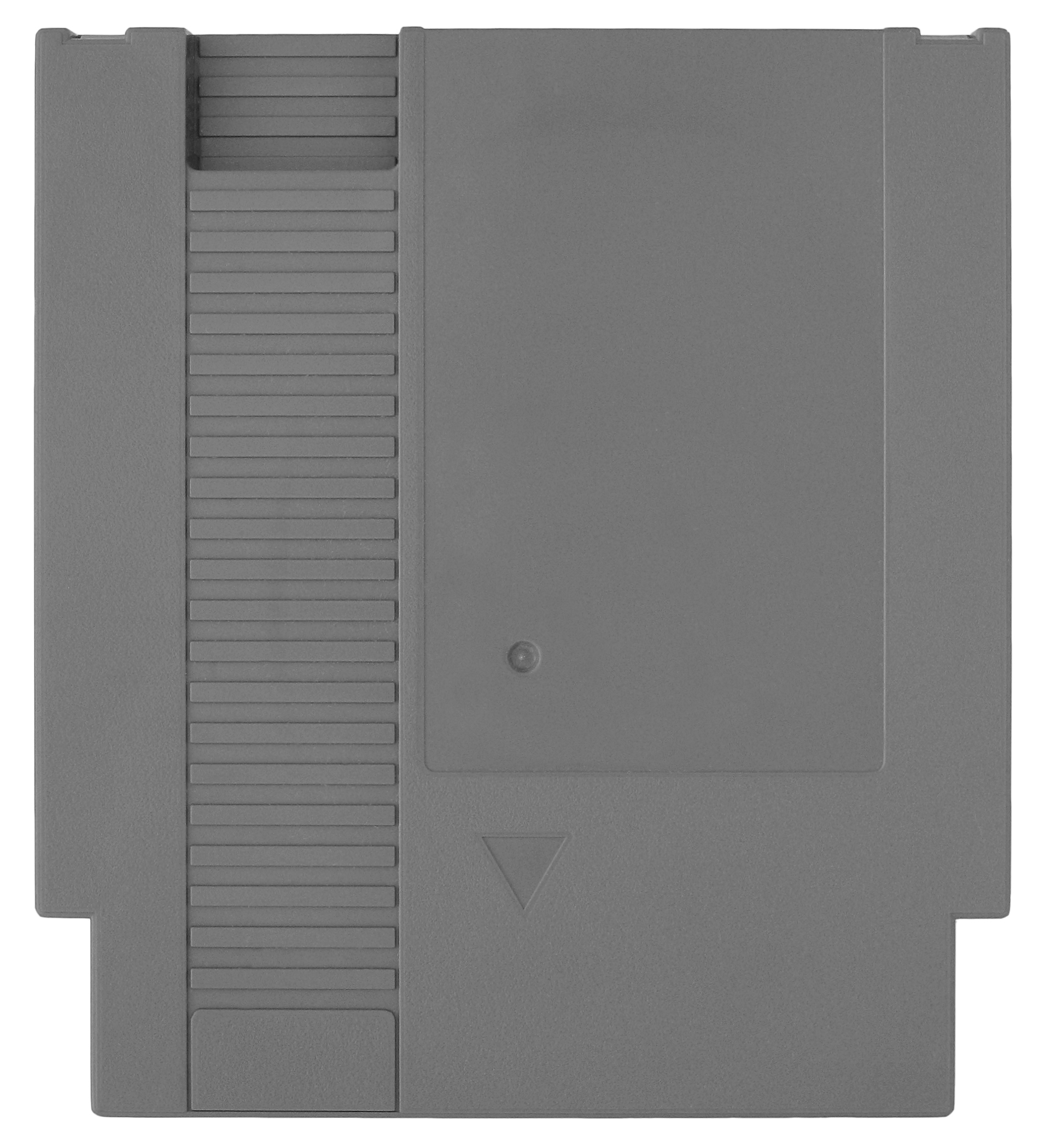
An NES cartridge (bottom) is taller than a typical Famicom cartridge (top).

The Nintendo Entertainment System has a library of 1370 (Note: This number is always up to date by this script.) officially licensed games released during their lifespans, plus 7 official multicarts and 2 championship cartridges. Of these, 672 were released exclusively in Japan, 187 were released exclusively in North America, and 19 were released exclusively in Phase Alternating Line (PAL) countries. Worldwide, 521 games were released.

Its launch games for the Famicom were Donkey Kong, Donkey Kong Jr., and Popeye. Only first-party titles were available upon launch, but Nintendo started a licensing program the following year that allowed third-party companies such as Namco, Hudson Soft, Taito, Konami, Bandai, and Capcom to create titles and produce their own cartridges for the Famicom in exchange for royalty payments; Nintendo later revised the program to mandate itself as the manufacturer of all cartridges while carrying it with the console outside Japan. The launch games for North America were: 10-Yard Fight, Baseball, Clu Clu Land, Duck Hunt, Excitebike, Golf, Gyromite, Hogan's Alley, Ice Climber, Kung Fu, Pinball, Soccer, Stack-Up, Super Mario Bros., Tennis, Wild Gunman, and Wrecking Crew. (Note: Donkey Kong Jr. Math and Mach Rider are often erroneously listed as launch games. Neither was available until later in 1986. Also, some modern sources question if Super Mario Bros. was available on launch day, though contemporaneous sources such as Computer Entertainer and The Milwaukee Journal state that the system launched with 17 titles, and the Journal references Super Mario Bros. by name.) The final licensed game released is the PAL-exclusive The Lion King on May 25, 1995.

As was typical for consoles of its era, games for the Famicom were primarily distributed on ROM cartridges, known in Japan as "Cassettes" (カセット, Kasetto); each cartridge features 60 pins, with two pins reserved for external sound chips. Famicom cassettes were intended to be the same size as Compact Cassettes in order to fit into their same standard plastic boxes; however, Nintendo engineers were unable to make the cartridges small enough. For the console's North American release in 1985 as the Nintendo Entertainment System, Nintendo redesigned the cartridge to accommodate the console's front-loading, videocassette recorder-derived socket by nearly doubling its height and increasing its width by one centimeter (0.39 in), resulting in a measurement of 13.3 cm (5.2 in) high by 12 cm (4.7 in) wide. Referred to as "Game Paks", each NES cartridge sports an increased total of 72 pins, with two pins reserved for the CIC lockout chip and ten pins reserved for connections with the console's bottom expansion port. However, the two pins for external sound were removed and relocated to the expansion port instead; any Famicom game using them would have its soundtrack recomposed for NES cartridge releases. Though the extra space of the NES cartridge was not utilized by most games, it enabled the inclusion of additional hardware expansions; in contrast, some copies of early NES games like Gyromite merely paired the printed circuit board of the game's Famicom version with an adapter to convert between the different pinouts. Cartridges have storage sizes ranging from 16 KB to 1 MB (8 Megabits), with 128 to 384 KB (1 to 3 Megabit) cartridges being the most commonly used.

Nintendo later released the Famicom Disk System (FDS) in Japan in 1986, intending to have developers distribute all future games on proprietary 2.8-inch (7.1 cm) floppy disks to avoid the cost and size limitations of cartridges; however, developers began re-releasing FDS games on cartridges as advancements in cartridge technology made them feasible again with the limitations of the floppy disks and their ecosystem apparent, pulling support for the FDS by the 1990s.

== Licensed games ==
Regions released	Region description	Released
Japan	Japanese NTSC-J formatted release.	1062
North America	North America and other NTSC territories, besides Japan.	675
Europe / PAL	PAL formatted release. Territories include much of Europe, Australia, New Zealand, and parts of Asia.	347

Title(s)	Developer(s)	Publisher(s)	First released	Release date		
Title(s)	Developer(s)	Publisher(s)	First released	JP	NA	PAL
'89 Dennō Kyūsei Uranai	Micronics	Jingukan Polaris	December 10, 1988^{JP}	December 10, 1988	Unreleased	Unreleased
The 3-D Battles of WorldRunner	Square	Acclaim Entertainment	September 1987^{NA}	Unreleased (Note: This game was originally released on the Famicom Disk System.)	September 1987	Unreleased
4 Nin Uchi Mahjong	Hudson Soft	Nintendo	November 2, 1984^{JP}	November 2, 1984	Unreleased	Unreleased
8 Eyes	Thinking Rabbit	SETA^{JP} Taxan^{NA}	September 27, 1988^{JP}	September 27, 1988	January 1990	Unreleased
10-Yard Fight	Tose	Irem^{JP} Nintendo^{NA/PAL}	August 30, 1985^{JP}	August 30, 1985	October 18, 1985	December 6, 1986
720°	Beam Software	Mindscape	December 1989^{NA}	Unreleased	December 1989	Unreleased
1942	Micronics	Capcom	December 11, 1985^{JP}	December 11, 1985	November 1986	Unreleased
1943: The Battle of Midway; 1943: The Battle of Valhalla^{JP}	Capcom	Capcom	June 20, 1988^{JP}	June 20, 1988	October 1988	Unreleased
1999: Hore Mita Koto Ka! Seikimatsu	Coconuts Japan	Coconuts Japan	September 18, 1992^{JP}	September 18, 1992	Unreleased	Unreleased
A Ressha de Ikō	Artdink	Pony Canyon	August 21, 1991^{JP}	August 21, 1991	Unreleased	Unreleased
Aa Yakyū Jinsei Icchokusen	Sammy	Sammy	December 25, 1992^{JP}	December 25, 1992	Unreleased	Unreleased
Abadox: The Deadly Inner War	Natsume	Natsume^{JP} Milton Bradley^{NA}	December 15, 1989^{JP}	December 15, 1989	March 1990	Unreleased
The Addams Family	Ocean Software	Ocean Software	January 1992^{NA}	Unreleased	January 1992	December 30, 1992
The Addams Family: Pugsley's Scavenger Hunt	Enigma Variations	Ocean Software	1992^{PAL}	Unreleased	August 1993	1992
Advanced Dungeons & Dragons: Dragons of Flame	Atelier Double	Pony Canyon	February 21, 1992^{JP}	February 21, 1992	Unreleased	Unreleased
Advanced Dungeons & Dragons: DragonStrike	Westwood Associates	FCI	July 1992^{NA}	Unreleased	July 1992	Unreleased
Advanced Dungeons & Dragons: Heroes of the Lance	Natsume	FCI^{NA} Pony Canyon^{JP}	January 1991^{NA}	March 8, 1991	January 1991	Unreleased
Advanced Dungeons & Dragons: Hillsfar	Crosstalk	Pony Canyon^{JP} FCI^{NA}	March 21, 1991^{JP}	March 21, 1991	February 1993	Unreleased
Advanced Dungeons & Dragons: Pool of Radiance	Marionette; SRS	Pony Canyon^{JP} FCI^{NA}	June 28, 1991^{JP}	June 28, 1991	April 1992	Unreleased
Adventure Island; Takahashi Meijin no Bōken Jima^{JP} Adventure Island Classic^{PAL} Adventure Island in the Pacific^{FR}	Hudson Soft	Hudson Soft	September 12, 1986^{JP}	September 12, 1986	September 1988	1992
Adventure Island II; Takahashi Meijin no Bōken Jima II^{JP} The Adventure Island Part II^{PAL}	Now Production	Hudson Soft	February 1991^{NA}	April 26, 1991	February 1991	July 22, 1992
Adventure Island 3 Takahashi Meijin no Bōken Jima III^{JP}	Now Production	Hudson Soft	July 31, 1992^{JP}	July 31, 1992	September 1992	Unreleased
Adventures in the Magic Kingdom	Capcom	Capcom	June 1990^{NA}	Unreleased	June 1990	December 10, 1992
The Adventures of Bayou Billy; Mad City^{JP}	Konami	Konami	August 12, 1988^{JP}	August 12, 1988	June 1989	January 24, 1991
Adventures of Dino Riki; Shin Jinrui: The New Type^{JP}	Hudson Soft	Rix Soft^{JP} Hudson Soft^{NA}	February 10, 1987^{JP}	February 10, 1987	October 1989	Unreleased
The Adventures of Gilligan's Island	Human Entertainment	Bandai	July 1990^{NA}	Unreleased	July 1990	Unreleased
Adventures of Lolo	HAL Laboratory	HAL Laboratory	April 1989^{NA}	Unreleased	April 1989	December 28, 1990
Adventures of Lolo 2 Adventures of Lolo^{JP}	HAL Laboratory	HAL Laboratory	January 6, 1990^{JP}	January 6, 1990	March 1990	February 21, 1991
Adventures of Lolo 3 Adventures of Lolo 2^{JP}	HAL Laboratory	HAL Laboratory	December 26, 1990^{JP}	December 26, 1990	September 1991	May 27, 1992
The Adventures of Rad Gravity	Interplay Productions	Activision	December 1990^{NA}	Unreleased	December 1990	May 30, 1991
The Adventures of Rocky and Bullwinkle and Friends	Radical Entertainment	THQ	December 1992^{NA}	Unreleased	December 1992	Unreleased
Adventures of Tom Sawyer	Winkysoft	SETA	February 6, 1989^{JP}	February 6, 1989	August 1989	Unreleased
After Burner	Sunsoft	Sunsoft	March 30, 1989^{JP}	March 30, 1989	Unreleased (Note: This game was released on an unlicensed cartridge in this region. As such, the title is considered to be unreleased within this table.)	Unreleased
Ai Sensei no Oshiete: Watashi no Hoshi	Irem	Irem	March 26, 1993^{JP}	March 26, 1993	Unreleased	Unreleased
Aighina no Yogen: From the Legend of Balubalouk	Vic Tokai	Vic Tokai	November 21, 1986^{JP}	November 21, 1986	Unreleased	Unreleased
Air Fortress	HAL Laboratory	HAL Laboratory	August 17, 1987^{JP}	August 17, 1987	September 1989	1989
Airwolf	Beam Software	Acclaim Entertainment	August 1988^{PAL}	Unreleased	June 1989	December 6, 1990
Airwolf (JP)	Kyugo Boueki	Kyugo Boueki	December 24, 1988^{JP}	December 24, 1988	Unreleased	Unreleased
Akagawa Jirō no Yurei Ressha	Mighty Craft	King Records	February 8, 1991^{JP}	February 8, 1991	Unreleased	Unreleased
Akira	Tose	Taito	December 24, 1988^{JP}	December 24, 1988	Unreleased	Unreleased
Akuma-kun: Makai no Wana	Tose	Bandai	February 24, 1990^{JP}	February 24, 1990	Unreleased	Unreleased
Akumajō Special: Boku Dracula-kun	Konami	Konami	October 19, 1990^{JP}	October 19, 1990	Unreleased	Unreleased
Al Unser Jr.'s Turbo Racing; World Grand-Prix - Pole To Finish^{JP} Turbo Racing^{PAL}	Data East	Data East	January 31, 1989^{JP}	January 31, 1989	March 1990	1991
Aladdin	NMS Software	Virgin Interactive Entertainment	December 31, 1994^{PAL}	Unreleased	Unreleased	February 23, 1995
Alex Demeo's Race America; Corvette ZR-1 Challenge^{PAL}	Imagineering	Milton Bradley^{PAL} Absolute Entertainment^{NA}	1990^{PAL}	Unreleased	May 1992	1990
Alfred Chicken	Twilight	Mindscape	1993^{PAL}	Unreleased	February 1994	1993
Alien 3	Probe Software	LJN	March 1993^{NA}	Unreleased	March 1993	1993
Alien Syndrome	Sanritsu	Sunsoft	December 2, 1988^{JP}	December 2, 1988	Unreleased	Unreleased
All-Pro Basketball; Zenbei!! Pro Basketball^{JP}	Aicom	Vic Tokai	July 21, 1989^{JP}	July 21, 1989	December 1989	Unreleased
Alpha Mission; ASO: Armored Scrum Object^{JP}	SNK	SNK	September 3, 1986^{JP}	September 3, 1986	October 1987	April 22, 1989
Amagon; Totsuzen! Macho Man^{JP}	Aicom	Vic Tokai^{JP} American Sammy^{NA}	December 2, 1988^{JP}	December 2, 1988	April 1989	Unreleased
America Daitōryō Senkyo	Axes Art Amusement	Hect	October 28, 1988^{JP}	October 28, 1988	Unreleased	Unreleased
America Oudan Ultra Quiz: Shijou Saidai no Tatakai	Pixel	Tomy	November 29, 1991^{JP}	November 29, 1991	Unreleased	Unreleased
American Dream	C-Dream	Coconuts Japan	September 23, 1989^{JP}	September 23, 1989	Unreleased	Unreleased
American Gladiators	Incredible Technologies	GameTek	October 1991^{NA}	Unreleased	October 1991	Unreleased
Ankoku Shinwa: Yamato Takeru Densetsu	ZAP Corporation	Tokyo Shoseki	March 24, 1989^{JP}	March 24, 1989	Unreleased	Unreleased
Anticipation	Rare	Nintendo	December 1988^{NA}	Unreleased	December 1988	October 25, 1989
Aoki Ōkami to Shiroki Mejika: Genchou Hishi	Koei	Koei	March 25, 1993^{JP}	March 25, 1993	Unreleased	Unreleased
Arch Rivals	Rare	Acclaim Entertainment	November 1990^{NA}	Unreleased	November 1990	1990
Archon	Bullet-Proof Software	Activision	December 1989^{NA}	Unreleased	December 1989	Unreleased
Arctic	Artdink	Pony Canyon	February 23, 1990^{JP}	February 23, 1990	Unreleased	Unreleased
Argus	NMK	Jaleco	April 17, 1986^{JP}	April 17, 1986	Unreleased	Unreleased
Arkanoid	Taito	Taito	December 26, 1986^{JP}	December 26, 1986	August 1987	Unreleased
Arkanoid II: Revenge of Doh	Daiei Seisakusho	Taito	March 8, 1988^{JP}	March 8, 1988	Unreleased	Unreleased
Arkista's Ring	NMK	American Sammy	June 1990^{NA}	Unreleased	June 1990	Unreleased
Armadillo	AIM	IGS	August 9, 1991^{JP}	August 9, 1991	Unreleased (Note: This game received a full localization for this region, but was not released.)	Unreleased
Artelius	Nichibutsu	Nichibutsu	November 13, 1987^{JP}	November 13, 1987	Unreleased	Unreleased
Asmik-kun Land	Graphic Research	Asmik	December 20, 1991^{JP}	December 20, 1991	Unreleased	Unreleased
Asterix	Bit Managers	Infogrames	1993^{PAL}	Unreleased	Unreleased	1993
Astro Fang: Super Machine	Soft Machine	A-Wave	October 26, 1990^{JP}	October 26, 1990	Unreleased	Unreleased
Astro Robo Sasa	Workss	ASCII	August 9, 1985^{JP}	August 9, 1985	Unreleased	Unreleased
Astyanax; Lord of King^{JP}	Aicom	Jaleco	December 21, 1989^{JP}	December 21, 1989	March 1990	1990
Athena	Micronics	SNK	June 5, 1987^{JP}	June 5, 1987	August 1987	Unreleased
Atlantis no Nazo	Sunsoft	Sunsoft	April 17, 1986^{JP}	April 17, 1986	Unreleased	Unreleased
Athletic World; Family Trainer: Athletic World^{JP}	Human Entertainment	Bandai^{JP/NA} Nintendo^{PAL}	November 12, 1986^{JP}	November 12, 1986	July 1987	June 15, 1988
Attack Animal Gakuen	Newtopia Planning; Scitron & Art	Pony Canyon	December 26, 1987^{JP}	December 26, 1987	Unreleased	Unreleased
Attack of the Killer Tomatoes	Imagineering	THQ	January 1992^{NA}	Unreleased	January 1992	January 12, 1993
Aussie Rules Footy	Beam Software	Laser Beam	1991^{AUS}	Unreleased	Unreleased	1991
B-Wings	Data East	Data East	June 3, 1986^{JP}	June 3, 1986	Unreleased	Unreleased
Babel no Tō	Namco	Namco	July 18, 1986^{JP}	July 18, 1986	Unreleased	Unreleased
Back to the Future	Beam Software	LJN	September 1989^{NA}	Unreleased	September 1989	Unreleased
Back to the Future Part II & III	Beam Software	LJN	September 1990^{NA}	Unreleased	September 1990	Unreleased
Bad Dudes; Dragon Ninja^{JP} Bad Dudes Vs. DragonNinja^{PAL}	Data East	Namco^{JP} Data East^{NA} Ocean Software^{PAL}	July 14, 1989^{JP}	July 14, 1989	August 1989	1990
Bad News Baseball; Gekitō!! Stadium^{JP}	Tecmo	Tecmo	December 15, 1989^{JP}	December 15, 1989	June 1990	Unreleased
Bad Street Brawler	Beam Software	Mattel	September 1989^{NA}	Unreleased	September 1989	Unreleased
Baken Hisshou Gaku: Gate In	Graphic Research	K Amusement	May 25, 1990^{JP}	May 25, 1990	Unreleased	Unreleased
Bakushō!! Ai no Gekijō	Coconuts Japan	Coconuts Japan	December 29, 1990^{JP}	December 29, 1990	Unreleased	Unreleased
Bakushō! Star Monomane Shitennō	Pack-In-Video	Pack-In-Video	September 14, 1990^{JP}	September 14, 1990	Unreleased	Unreleased
Bakushou!! Jinsei Gekijou	Taito	Taito	March 17, 1989^{JP}	March 17, 1989	Unreleased	Unreleased
Bakushou!! Jinsei Gekijou 2	Taito	Taito	March 22, 1991^{JP}	March 22, 1991	Unreleased	Unreleased
Bakushou!! Jinsei Gekijou 3	Taito	Taito	December 20, 1991^{JP}	December 20, 1991	Unreleased	Unreleased
Ballblazer	Lucasfilm Games	Pony Canyon	March 4, 1988^{JP}	March 4, 1988	Unreleased	Unreleased
Balloon Fight	Nintendo R&D1; HAL Laboratory	Nintendo	January 22, 1985^{JP}	January 22, 1985	June 1986	March 12, 1987
Baltron	Shouei System	Toei Animation	March 19, 1986^{JP}	March 19, 1986	Unreleased	Unreleased
Banana	Victor Musical Industries	Victor Musical Industries	September 8, 1986^{JP}	September 8, 1986	Unreleased	Unreleased
Banana Prince; Bananan Ōji no Daibōken^{JP}	KID	Takara	December 20, 1991^{JP}	December 20, 1991	Unreleased	December 6, 1992
Bandai Golf: Challenge Pebble Beach	Tose	Bandai	February 1989^{NA}	Unreleased	February 1989	Unreleased
Bandit Kings of Ancient China; Suikoden: Tenmei no Chikai^{JP}	Koei	Koei	June 25, 1990^{JP}	June 25, 1990	December 1990	Unreleased
Barbie	Imagineering	Hi Tech Expressions	December 1991^{NA}	Unreleased	December 1991	1992
Barcode World	Epoch	Sunsoft	December 18, 1992^{JP}	December 18, 1992	Unreleased	Unreleased
Bard's Tale: Tales of the Unknown	Atelier Double	Pony Canyon^{JP} FCI^{NA}	December 21, 1990^{JP}	December 21, 1990	November 1991	Unreleased
The Bard's Tale II: The Destiny Knight	Atelier Double	Pony Canyon	January 25, 1992^{JP}	January 25, 1992	Unreleased	Unreleased
Barker Bill's Trick Shooting	Nintendo R&D1	Nintendo	August 1990^{NA}	Unreleased	August 1990	June 27, 1991
Baseball	Nintendo R&D1	Nintendo	December 7, 1983^{JP}	December 7, 1983	October 18, 1985	September 1, 1986
Baseball Fighter	Graphic Research	VAP	July 5, 1991^{JP}	July 5, 1991	Unreleased	Unreleased
Baseball Simulator 1.000; Choujin Ultra Baseball^{JP}	Culture Brain	Culture Brain	October 27, 1989^{JP}	October 27, 1989	March 1990	Unreleased
Baseball Stars	SNK	SNK	May 19, 1989^{JP}	May 19, 1989	July 1989	Unreleased
Baseball Stars 2	Pixel	Romstar	July 1992^{NA}	Unreleased	July 1992	Unreleased
Bases Loaded; Moero!! Pro Yakyū^{JP}	Tose	Jaleco	June 26, 1987^{JP}	June 26, 1987	July 1988	Unreleased
Bases Loaded II: Second Season; Moero!! Pro Yakyū '88 Kettei Ban^{JP}	Tose	Jaleco	August 10, 1988^{JP}	August 10, 1988	January 1990	Unreleased
Bases Loaded 3 MoePro! Yakyū '90 Kandō Hen^{JP}	Tose	Jaleco	July 27, 1990^{JP}	July 27, 1990	September 1991	Unreleased
Bases Loaded 4 MoePro! Saikyō Hen^{JP}	Tose	Jaleco	November 22, 1991^{JP}	November 22, 1991	April 1993	Unreleased
Batman: Return of the Joker	Sunsoft	Sunsoft	December 20, 1991^{JP}	December 20, 1991	December 1991	1992
Batman Returns	Konami	Konami	January 1993^{NA}	Unreleased	January 1993	May 23, 1993
Batman: The Video Game	Sunsoft	Sunsoft	December 22, 1989^{JP}	December 22, 1989	February 1990	September 14, 1990
Bats & Terry	Use Corporation	Use Corporation	July 22, 1987^{JP}	July 22, 1987	Unreleased	Unreleased
Battle Baseball	Minato Giken	Banpresto	February 19, 1993^{JP}	February 19, 1993	Unreleased	Unreleased
Battle Chess	Beam Software	Data East	July 1990^{NA}	Unreleased	July 1990	Unreleased
Battle City	Namco	Namco	September 9, 1985^{JP}	September 9, 1985	Unreleased	Unreleased
Battle Fleet	Atlus	Namco	June 22, 1990^{JP}	June 22, 1990	Unreleased	Unreleased
The Battle of Olympus	Infinity	Imagineer^{JP} Broderbund^{NA} Nintendo^{PAL}	March 28, 1988^{JP}	March 28, 1988	January 1990	1991
Battle Stadium: Senbatsu Pro Yakyū	IGS	IGS	December 20, 1990^{JP}	December 20, 1990	Unreleased	Unreleased
Battleship	Mindscape	Mindscape	September 1993^{NA}	Unreleased	September 1993	September 13, 1993
Battle Storm	Bullet-Proof Software	Yonezawa PR21	December 21, 1991^{JP}	December 21, 1991	Unreleased	Unreleased
Battletank	Imagineering	Absolute Entertainment	September 1990^{NA}	Unreleased	September 1990	Unreleased
Battletoads	Rare	Tradewest^{NA/PAL} Masaya^{JP}	June 1991^{NA}	December 20, 1991	June 1991	February 18, 1993
Battletoads & Double Dragon: The Ultimate Team	Rare	Tradewest^{NA} Nintendo^{PAL}	June 1993^{NA}	Unreleased	June 1993	1993
Beauty and the Beast	Probe Software	Hudson Soft	1994^{PAL}	Unreleased	Unreleased	1994
Be-Bop High School: Kōkōsei Gokuraku Densetsu	Data East	Data East	March 30, 1988^{JP}	March 30, 1988	Unreleased	Unreleased
Beetlejuice	Rare	LJN	May 1991^{NA}	Unreleased	May 1991	Unreleased
Best of the Best: Championship Karate	Loriciel	Electro Brain^{NA} Loriciel^{PAL}	December 1992^{NA}	Unreleased	December 1992	1993
Best Play Pro Yakyū	ASCII	ASCII	July 15, 1988^{JP}	July 15, 1988	Unreleased	Unreleased
Best Play Pro Yakyū II	ASCII	ASCII	March 30, 1990^{JP}	March 30, 1990	Unreleased	Unreleased
Best Play Pro Yakyū '90	ASCII	ASCII	December 13, 1990^{JP}	December 13, 1990	Unreleased	Unreleased
Best Play Pro Yakyū Special	ASCII	ASCII	October 16, 1992^{JP}	October 16, 1992	Unreleased	Unreleased
Bigfoot	Beam Software	Acclaim Entertainment	July 1990^{NA}	Unreleased	July 1990	January 24, 1991
Bikkuriman World: Gekitō Sei Senshi	Atlus	Hudson Soft	July 27, 1990^{JP}	July 27, 1990	Unreleased	Unreleased
Bill & Ted's Excellent Video Game Adventure	Rocket Science Productions	LJN	August 1991^{NA}	Unreleased	August 1991	Unreleased
Bill Elliott's NASCAR Challenge	Distinctive Software	Konami	April 1991^{NA}	Unreleased	April 1991	Unreleased
Binary Land	Hudson Soft	Hudson Soft	December 19, 1985^{JP}	December 19, 1985	Unreleased	Unreleased
Bio Miracle Bokutte Upa	Konami	Konami	February 26, 1993^{JP}	February 26, 1993	Unreleased	Unreleased
Bionic Commando	Capcom	Capcom	July 20, 1988^{JP}	July 20, 1988	December 1988	October 26, 1990
Bio Senshi Dan: Increaser to no Tatakai	Atlus	Jaleco	September 22, 1987^{JP}	September 22, 1987	Unreleased	Unreleased
Bird Week	Lenar	Toshiba EMI	June 3, 1986^{JP}	June 3, 1986	Unreleased	Unreleased
The Black Bass (JP)	Hot-B	Hot-B	February 6, 1987^{JP}	February 6, 1987	Unreleased	Unreleased
The Black Bass; The Black Bass II^{JP}	Another	Hot-B	October 18, 1988^{JP}	October 18, 1988	September 1989	Unreleased
Blades of Steel	Konami	Konami	December 1988^{NA}	Unreleased	December 1988	November 23, 1990
Blaster Master; Chō Wakusei Senki Metafight^{JP}	Sunsoft	Sunsoft	June 17, 1988^{JP}	June 17, 1988	November 1988	April 25, 1991
Blodia Land: Puzzle Quest	Tose	Tonkin House	August 11, 1990^{JP}	August 11, 1990	Unreleased	Unreleased
Bloody Warriors: Shan Go no Gyakushū	Micronics	Toei Animation	October 19, 1990^{JP}	October 19, 1990	Unreleased	Unreleased
The Blue Marlin	Hot-B	Hot-B	December 27, 1991^{JP}	December 27, 1991	July 1992	Unreleased
The Blues Brothers	Titus France	Titus France	September 1992^{NA}	Unreleased	September 1992	1992
Bo Jackson Baseball	Beam Software	Data East	October 1991^{NA}	Unreleased	October 1991	Unreleased
Bokosuka Wars	ASCII	ASCII	December 14, 1985^{JP}	December 14, 1985	Unreleased	Unreleased
Bomberman	Hudson Soft	Hudson Soft	December 20, 1985^{JP}	December 20, 1985	January 1989	Unreleased
Bomberman II; Dynablaster^{PAL}	Hudson Soft	Hudson Soft	June 28, 1991^{JP}	June 28, 1991	February 1993	1991
Bonk's Adventure; FC Genjin^{JP}	A.I	Hudson Soft	July 30, 1993^{JP}	July 30, 1993	January 1994	Unreleased
Booby Kids	Nichibutsu	Nichibutsu	July 10, 1987^{JP}	July 10, 1987	Unreleased	Unreleased
Boulder Dash	Data East; Sakata SAS	Data East^{JP} JVC Musical Industries^{NA} Nintendo^{PAL}	March 23, 1990^{JP}	March 23, 1990	June 1990	November 1, 1991
A Boy and His Blob: Trouble on Blobolonia	Imagineering	Absolute Entertainment^{NA} Jaleco^{JP} Nintendo^{PAL}	January 1990^{NA}	November 29, 1990	January 1990	August 3, 1991
Bram Stoker's Dracula	Probe Software	Sony Imagesoft	September 1993^{NA}	Unreleased	September 1993	1993
Break Time: The National Pool Tour	Opera House	FCI	January 1993^{NA}	Unreleased	January 1993	Unreleased
BreakThru	Data East	Data East	November 1987^{NA}	Unreleased	November 1987	Unreleased
Bubble Bobble	Taito	Taito	November 1988^{NA}	Unreleased	November 1988	October 26, 1990
Bubble Bobble Part 2 Bubble Bobble 2^{JP}	ITL; OLM	Taito	March 5, 1993^{JP}	March 5, 1993	August 1993	Unreleased
Bucky O'Hare	Konami	Konami	January 31, 1992^{JP}	January 31, 1992	February 1992	February 18, 1993
The Bugs Bunny Birthday Blowout; Happy Birthday Bugs^{JP} The Bugs Bunny Blowout^{PAL}	Kemco	Kemco^{JP/PAL} Seika^{NA}	August 3, 1990^{JP}	August 3, 1990	September 1990	1990
The Bugs Bunny Crazy Castle	Kemco	Seika	September 1989^{NA}	Unreleased	September 1989	Unreleased
Bump 'n' Jump; Buggy Popper^{JP}	Data East; Sakata SAS	Data East^{JP} Vic Tokai^{NA}	October 8, 1986^{JP}	October 8, 1986	December 1988	Unreleased
Burai Fighter	KID	Taxan^{NA} Taito^{JP} Nintendo^{PAL}	March 1990^{NA}	July 20, 1990	March 1990	July 4, 1991
BurgerTime	Data East; Sakata SAS	Namco^{JP} Data East^{NA}	November 27, 1985^{JP}	November 27, 1985	May 1987	Unreleased
Business Wars	Hect	Hect	January 24, 1992^{JP}	January 24, 1992	Unreleased	Unreleased
Cabal	Rare	Milton Bradley	July 1990^{NA}	Unreleased	July 1990	Unreleased
Cadillac	Hect	Hect	February 2, 1990^{JP}	February 2, 1990	Unreleased	Unreleased
Caesars Palace	Realtime Associates	Virgin Games	December 1992^{NA}	Unreleased	December 1992	Unreleased
California Games	Rare	Milton Bradley	June 1989^{NA}	Unreleased	June 1989	August 15, 1991
Capcom's Gold Medal Challenge '92; Capcom Barcelona '92^{JP}	Capcom	Capcom	June 5, 1992^{JP}	June 5, 1992	August 1992	June 17, 1993
Captain America and The Avengers	Data East	Data East	December 1991^{NA}	Unreleased	December 1991	1991
Captain Ed	Graphic Research	CBS Sony Group	August 25, 1989^{JP}	August 25, 1989	Unreleased	Unreleased
Captain Planet and the Planeteers	Chris Gray Enterprises	Mindscape	September 1991^{NA}	Unreleased	September 1991	August 20, 1992
Captain Silver	Data East; Jorudan	Tokuma Shoten	December 16, 1988^{JP}	December 16, 1988	Unreleased	Unreleased
Captain Skyhawk	Rare	Milton Bradley^{NA} Nintendo^{PAL}	June 1990^{NA}	Unreleased	June 1990	May 26, 1994
Captain Tsubasa Vol. II: Super Striker	Tecmo	Tecmo	July 20, 1990^{JP}	July 20, 1990	Unreleased	Unreleased
Casino Derby & Super Bingo	Outback	Yonezawa PR21	March 19, 1993^{JP}	March 19, 1993	Unreleased	Unreleased
Casino Kid $1,000,000 Kid: Maboroshi no Teiou Hen^{JP}	SOFEL	SOFEL	January 6, 1989^{JP}	January 6, 1989	October 1989	Unreleased
Casino Kid 2	SOFEL	SOFEL	April 1993^{NA}	Unreleased	April 1993	Unreleased
Castelian; Kyorochan Land^{JP}	Bits Studios	Triffix^{NA} Hiro^{JP} Storm Sales Curve^{PAL}	June 1991^{NA}	December 11, 1992	June 1991	1992
Castle of Dragon; Dragon Unit^{JP}	Athena	Athena^{JP} SETA^{NA}	February 27, 1990^{JP}	February 27, 1990	June 1990	Unreleased
Castle Quest	Hudson Soft	Hudson Soft	May 18, 1990^{JP}	May 18, 1990	Unreleased	Unreleased
Castlequest; Castle Excellent^{JP}	ASCII	ASCII^{JP} Nexoft^{NA}	November 28, 1986^{JP}	November 28, 1986	September 1989	Unreleased
Castlevania	Konami	Konami	April 30, 1987^{NA}	February 5, 1993	April 30, 1987	December 19, 1988
Castlevania II: Simon's Quest	Konami	Konami	November 24, 1988^{NA}	Unreleased	November 24, 1988	April 27, 1990
Castlevania III: Dracula's Curse	Konami	Konami	December 22, 1989^{JP}	December 22, 1989	September 19, 1990	December 10, 1992
Caveman Games		Data East	October 1990^{NA}	Unreleased	October 1990	Unreleased
Chack'n Pop	Tose	Taito	May 24, 1985^{JP}	May 24, 1985	Unreleased	Unreleased
Challenger	Hudson Soft	Hudson Soft	October 15, 1985^{JP}	October 15, 1985	Unreleased	Unreleased
Championship Bowling	Athena	Romstar^{NA} Athena^{JP}	December 1989^{NA}	February 8, 1991	December 1989	Unreleased
Championship Lode Runner	Hudson Soft	Hudson Soft	April 17, 1985^{JP}	April 17, 1985	Unreleased	Unreleased
Championship Pool	Bitmasters	Mindscape	October 1993^{NA}	Unreleased	October 1993	Unreleased
Championship Rally; Exciting Rally: World Rally Championship^{JP}	Human Entertainment	HAL Laboratory^{PAL} Kaken^{JP}	1991^{PAL}	April 24, 1992	Unreleased	1991
Chaos World	Natsume	Natsume	October 25, 1991^{JP}	October 25, 1991	Unreleased	Unreleased
The Chessmaster	The Software Toolworks	Hi Tech Expressions^{NA} Nintendo^{PAL}	January 1990^{NA}	Unreleased	January 1990	March 26, 1992
Chester Field: Ankoku Shin e no Chōsen	Vic Tokai	Vic Tokai	July 30, 1987^{JP}	July 30, 1987	Unreleased	Unreleased
Chibi Maruko-chan: Uki Uki Shopping	Namco	Namco	October 4, 1991^{JP}	October 4, 1991	Unreleased	Unreleased
Chiisana Obake Acchi, Kocchi, Socchi	Atlus	VAP	December 4, 1992^{JP}	December 4, 1992	Unreleased	Unreleased
Chip 'n Dale: Rescue Rangers	Capcom	Capcom	June 8, 1990^{JP}	June 8, 1990	June 1990	December 12, 1991
Chip 'n Dale: Rescue Rangers 2	Capcom	Capcom	December 10, 1993^{JP}	December 10, 1993	January 1994	September 29, 1994
Chiyonofuji no Ōichō	Arc System Works	Face	December 7, 1990^{JP}	December 7, 1990	Unreleased	Unreleased
Choplifter	Tose	Jaleco	June 26, 1986^{JP}	June 26, 1986	Unreleased	Unreleased
Chō Jikū Yōsai Macross	Namco	Namco	December 10, 1985^{JP}	December 10, 1985	Unreleased	Unreleased
Chōjin Sentai Jetman	Natsume	Angel	December 21, 1991^{JP}	December 21, 1991	Unreleased	Unreleased
Chubby Cherub; Obake no Q-tarō: WanWan Panic^{JP}	Tose	Bandai	December 16, 1985^{JP}	December 16, 1985	October 1986	Unreleased
Chūgoku Janshi Story: Tonpū	ZAP Corporation	Natsume	December 23, 1989^{JP}	December 23, 1989	Unreleased	Unreleased
Chuugoku Senseijutsu	Aicom	Jaleco	November 29, 1988^{JP}	November 29, 1988	Unreleased	Unreleased
Chuuka Taisen	Disco	Taito	September 22, 1989^{JP}	September 22, 1989	Unreleased	Unreleased
Circus Caper; Moeru! Onīsan^{JP}	Advance Communication Company	Toho	August 8, 1989^{JP}	August 8, 1989	July 1990	Unreleased
Circus Charlie	Konami	Soft Pro	March 4, 1986^{JP}	March 4, 1986	Unreleased	Unreleased
City Adventure Touch: Mystery of Triangle	Compile	Toho	March 14, 1987^{JP}	March 14, 1987	Unreleased	Unreleased
City Connection	Hect	Jaleco	September 27, 1985^{JP}	September 27, 1985	May 1988	1988
Clash at Demonhead; Dengeki Big Bang!^{JP}	Vic Tokai	Vic Tokai	January 27, 1989^{JP}	January 27, 1989	December 1989	Unreleased
Classic Concentration	Softie	GameTek	September 1990^{NA}	Unreleased	September 1990	Unreleased
Cliffhanger	Spidersoft	Sony Imagesoft	November 1993^{NA}	Unreleased	November 1993	Unreleased
Clu Clu Land	Nintendo R&D1	Nintendo	November 22, 1984^{JP}	November 22, 1984	October 18, 1985	February 15, 1987
Cobra Command	Data East	Data East	October 21, 1988^{JP}	October 21, 1988	November 1988	Unreleased
Cobra Triangle	Rare	Nintendo	July 1989^{NA}	Unreleased	July 1989	October 25, 1989
Cocoron	K2	Sur Dé Wave	May 3, 1991^{JP}	May 3, 1991	Unreleased	Unreleased
Code Name: Viper; Ningen Heiki Dead Fox^{JP}	Arc System Works; Capcom	Capcom	February 23, 1990^{JP}	February 23, 1990	March 1990	Unreleased
Columbus: Ōgon no Yoake	Tomy	Tomy	November 20, 1992^{JP}	November 20, 1992	Unreleased	Unreleased
Color a Dinosaur	FarSight Studios	Virgin Games	July 1993^{NA}	Unreleased	July 1993	Unreleased
Commando; Senjō no Ōkami^{JP}	Capcom	Capcom	September 27, 1986^{JP}	September 27, 1986	November 1986	Unreleased
Conan: The Mysteries of Time	Eastridge Technology	Mindscape	February 1991^{NA}	Unreleased	February 1991	Unreleased
Conflict	Vic Tokai	Vic Tokai	December 1, 1989^{JP}	December 1, 1989	March 1990	Unreleased
Conquest of the Crystal Palace; Matendōji^{JP}	Quest	Quest^{JP} Asmik^{NA}	August 24, 1990^{JP}	August 24, 1990	November 1990	Unreleased
Contra; Probotector^{PAL}	Konami	Konami	February 9, 1988^{JP}	February 9, 1988	February 12, 1988	December 28, 1990
Contra Force	Konami	Konami	September 1992^{NA}	Unreleased	September 1992	Unreleased
Cool World	Ocean Software	Ocean Software	June 1993^{NA}	Unreleased	June 1993	Unreleased
Cosmic Epsilon	Home Data	Asmik	November 24, 1989^{JP}	November 24, 1989	Unreleased	Unreleased
Cosmic Wars	Konami	Konami	August 4, 1989^{JP}	August 4, 1989	Unreleased	Unreleased
Cosmo Police Galivan	Nichibutsu	Nichibutsu	June 3, 1988^{JP}	June 3, 1988	Unreleased	Unreleased
Cowboy Kid; Western Kids^{JP}	Pixel	Visco^{JP} Romstar^{NA}	September 13, 1991^{JP}	September 13, 1991	January 1992	Unreleased
Crackout	Konami	Palcom Software	1991^{PAL}	Unreleased	Unreleased	1991
Crash 'n' the Boys: Street Challenge; Bikkuri Nekketsu Shin Kiroku! Harukanaru Kin Medal^{JP}	Technōs Japan	Technōs Japan^{JP} American Technōs^{NA}	June 26, 1992^{JP}	June 26, 1992	October 1992	Unreleased
Crayon Shin-Chan: Ora to Poi Poi (Note: This game was simultaneously released as a cartridge for both the Famicom and Bandai's Datach peripheral)	Tose	Bandai	August 27, 1993^{JP}	August 27, 1993	Unreleased	Unreleased
Crazy Climber	Nichibutsu	Nichibutsu	December 26, 1986^{JP}	December 26, 1986	Unreleased	Unreleased
Crisis Force	Konami	Konami	August 27, 1991^{JP}	August 27, 1991	Unreleased	Unreleased
CrossFire	Kyugo Boueki	Kyugo Boueki	November 2, 1990^{JP}	November 2, 1990	Unreleased	Unreleased
Crystalis; God Slayer: Haruka Tenkū no Sonata^{JP}	SNK	SNK	April 13, 1990^{JP}	April 13, 1990	July 1990	Unreleased
Cyberball	Tengen	Jaleco	January 1992^{NA}	Unreleased	January 1992	Unreleased
Cybernoid: The Fighting Machine	Gremlin Graphics	Acclaim Entertainment	December 1989^{NA}	Unreleased	December 1989	Unreleased
Cyber Stadium Series—Base Wars	Konami	Ultra Games	June 1991^{NA}	Unreleased	June 1991	Unreleased
Cycle Race: Road Man	Advance Communication Company	Tokyo Shoseki	December 17, 1988^{JP}	December 17, 1988	Unreleased	Unreleased
Dai-2-ji Super Robot Taisen	Winkysoft	Banpresto	December 29, 1991^{JP}	December 29, 1991	Unreleased	Unreleased
Daikaijū Deburas	Sol Corporation	Data East	December 21, 1990^{JP}	December 21, 1990	Unreleased	Unreleased
Daiku no Gen-san 2: Akage no Dan no Gyakushō	Micronics	Irem	October 22, 1993^{JP}	October 22, 1993	Unreleased	Unreleased
Dai Meiro: Meikyū no Tatsujin	Epoch	Epoch	November 30, 1990^{JP}	November 30, 1990	Unreleased	Unreleased
Dābīsutarion Zenkokuban	ASCII	ASCII	August 29, 1992^{JP}	August 29, 1992	Unreleased	Unreleased
Daisenryaku	Quest	Bothtec	October 11, 1988^{JP}	October 11, 1988	Unreleased	Unreleased
DAIVA Story 6: Nirsartia no Gyokuza	T&E Soft	Toshiba EMI	December 5, 1986^{JP}	December 5, 1986	Unreleased	Unreleased
Dance Aerobics; Family Trainer 3: Aerobics Studio^{JP}	Human Entertainment	Bandai^{JP} Nintendo^{NA}	February 26, 1987^{JP}	February 26, 1987	March 1989	Unreleased
Danny Sullivan's Indy Heat	Rare	Tradewest	August 1992^{NA}	Unreleased	August 1992	November 3, 1993
Dark Lord	Data East	Data East	February 8, 1991^{JP}	February 8, 1991	Unreleased	Unreleased
Darkman	Painting by Numbers	Ocean Software	October 1991^{NA}	Unreleased	October 1991	November 29, 1992
Darkwing Duck	Capcom	Capcom	June 1992^{NA}	Unreleased	June 1992	December 9, 1993
Dash Galaxy in the Alien Asylum	Beam Software	Data East	February 1990^{NA}	Unreleased	February 1990	Unreleased
Day Dreamin' Davey	Sculptured Software	HAL Laboratory	June 1992^{NA}	Unreleased	June 1992	Unreleased
Days of Thunder	Beam Software	Mindscape	October 1990^{NA}	Unreleased	October 1990	April 25, 1991
De-Block	Athena	Athena	August 9, 1991^{JP}	August 9, 1991	Unreleased	Unreleased
Deadly Towers; Mashō^{JP}	Lenar; Tamtex	Irem^{JP} Broderbund^{NA}	December 15, 1986^{JP}	December 15, 1986	September 1987	Unreleased
Deep Dungeon III: Yūshi e no Tabi	HummingBirdSoft	Square	May 13, 1988^{JP}	May 13, 1988	Unreleased	Unreleased
Deep Dungeon IV: Kuro no Yōjutsushi	HummingBirdSoft	Asmik	April 6, 1990^{JP}	April 6, 1990	Unreleased	Unreleased
Defender II; Star Gate^{JP}	HAL Laboratory	HAL Laboratory	September 24, 1987^{JP}	September 24, 1987	October 1988	Unreleased
Defender of the Crown	Beam Software	Ultra Games^{NA} Palcom Software^{PAL}	July 1989^{NA}	Unreleased	July 1989	July 25, 1991
Defenders of Dynatron City	Lucasfilm Games	JVC Musical Industries	July 1992^{NA}	Unreleased	July 1992	Unreleased
Déjà Vu	Kemco	Kemco^{JP/PAL} Seika^{NA}	November 22, 1988^{JP}	November 22, 1988	December 1990	September 24, 1992
Demon Sword; Fudō Myōō Den^{JP}	Tose	Taito	March 29, 1988^{JP}	March 29, 1988	January 1990	Unreleased
Derby Stallion: Best Keiba	ASCII	ASCII	December 21, 1991^{JP}	December 21, 1991	Unreleased	Unreleased
Desert Commander; Sensha Senryaku: Sabaku no Kitsune^{JP}	Kemco	Kemco^{JP} Seika^{NA}	April 28, 1988^{JP}	April 28, 1988	June 1989	Unreleased
Destination Earthstar	Imagineering	Acclaim Entertainment	February 1990^{NA}	Unreleased	February 1990	Unreleased
Destiny of an Emperor; Tenchi wo Kurau^{JP}	Capcom	Capcom	May 19, 1989^{JP}	May 19, 1989	September 1990	Unreleased
Devilman	ISCO	Namco	April 25, 1989^{JP}	April 25, 1989	Unreleased	Unreleased
Devil World	Nintendo R&D1; Intelligent Systems	Nintendo	October 5, 1984^{JP}	October 5, 1984	Unreleased	July 15, 1987
Dezaemon	Athena	Athena	September 13, 1991^{JP}	September 13, 1991	Unreleased	Unreleased
Dick Tracy	Realtime Associates	Bandai	August 1990^{NA}	Unreleased	August 1990	Unreleased
Die Hard	Pack-In-Video	Pack-In-Video^{JP} Activision^{NA/PAL}	July 19, 1991^{JP}	July 19, 1991	January 1992	1992
Dig Dug	Namco	Namco	June 4, 1985^{JP}	June 4, 1985	Unreleased	Unreleased
Dig Dug II	Namco	Namco^{JP} Bandai^{NA}	April 18, 1986^{JP}	April 18, 1986	December 1989	Unreleased
Digger T. Rock: Legend of the Lost City	Rare	Milton Bradley	December 1990^{NA}	Unreleased	December 1990	1991
Digital Devil Story: Megami Tensei	Atlus	Namco	September 11, 1987^{JP}	September 11, 1987	Unreleased	Unreleased
Digital Devil Story: Megami Tensei II	Atlus	Namco	April 6, 1990^{JP}	April 6, 1990	Unreleased	Unreleased
Dirty Harry	Gray Matter	Mindscape	December 1990^{NA}	Unreleased	December 1990	Unreleased
Dokuganryu Masamune	Namco	Namco	April 5, 1988^{JP}	April 5, 1988	Unreleased	Unreleased
Don Doko Don	ITL	Taito	March 9, 1990^{JP}	March 9, 1990	Unreleased	Unreleased
Don Doko Don 2	Natsume	Taito	January 31, 1992^{JP}	January 31, 1992	Unreleased	Unreleased
Donald Land	Data East	Data East	January 29, 1988^{JP}	January 29, 1988	Unreleased	Unreleased
Donkey Kong	Nintendo R&D2	Nintendo	July 15, 1983^{JP}	July 15, 1983	June 1986	October 15, 1986
Donkey Kong 3	Intelligent Systems	Nintendo	July 4, 1984^{JP}	July 4, 1984	June 1986	September 15, 1987
Donkey Kong Jr.	Nintendo R&D2	Nintendo	July 15, 1983^{JP}	July 15, 1983	June 1986	June 15, 1987
Donkey Kong Jr. Math	Nintendo R&D2	Nintendo	December 12, 1983^{JP}	December 12, 1983	June 1986	July 18, 1988
Door Door	Chunsoft	Enix	July 18, 1985^{JP}	July 18, 1985	Unreleased	Unreleased
Doraemon	Hudson Soft	Hudson Soft	December 12, 1986^{JP}	December 12, 1986	Unreleased	Unreleased
Doraemon: Giga Zombie no Gyakushū	Epoch	Epoch	September 14, 1990^{JP}	September 14, 1990	Unreleased	Unreleased
Double Dare	Rare	GameTek	April 1990^{NA}	Unreleased	April 1990	Unreleased
Double Dragon	Technōs Japan	Technōs Japan^{JP} Tradewest^{NA} Nintendo^{PAL}	April 8, 1988^{JP}	April 8, 1988	June 1988	March 21, 1992
Double Dragon II: The Revenge	Technōs Japan	Technōs Japan^{JP} Acclaim Entertainment^{NA/PAL}	December 22, 1989^{JP}	December 22, 1989	January 1990	September 26, 1991
Double Dragon III: The Sacred Stones; Double Dragon III: The Rosetta Stone^{JP}	Technōs Japan	Technōs Japan^{JP} Acclaim Entertainment^{NA/PAL}	February 22, 1991^{JP}	February 22, 1991	February 1991	November 24, 1994
Double Dribble	Konami	Konami	September 1987^{NA}	Unreleased	September 1987	December 13, 1989
Double Moon Densetsu	ORG Corporation; Amusement, Ltd. Dennou Kenkyusho	Masaya	October 30, 1992^{JP}	October 30, 1992	Unreleased	Unreleased
Dough Boy	Kemco	Kemco	December 11, 1985^{JP}	December 11, 1985	Unreleased	Unreleased
Downtown Nekketsu March: Super-Awesome Field Day!	Technōs Japan	Technōs Japan	October 12, 1990^{JP}	October 12, 1990	Unreleased	Unreleased
Downtown Special: Kunio-kun's Historical Period Drama!	Technōs Japan	Technōs Japan	July 26, 1991^{JP}	July 26, 1991	Unreleased	Unreleased
Dr. Chaos	Marionette; SRS	FCI	November 1988^{NA}	Unreleased	November 1988	Unreleased
Dr. Jekyll and Mr. Hyde	Advance Communication Company	Toho^{JP} Bandai^{NA}	April 8, 1988^{JP}	April 8, 1988	April 1989	Unreleased
Dr. Mario	Nintendo R&D1	Nintendo	July 27, 1990^{JP}	July 27, 1990	October 1990	June 27, 1991
Dragon Ball 3: Gokūden	Tose	Bandai	October 27, 1989^{JP}	October 27, 1989	Unreleased	Unreleased
Dragon Ball: Daimaō Fukkatsu	Tose	Bandai	August 12, 1988^{JP}	August 12, 1988	Unreleased	Unreleased
Dragon Ball Z: Kyōshū! Saiyajin	Tose	Bandai	October 27, 1990^{JP}	October 27, 1990	Unreleased	Unreleased
Dragon Ball Z Gaiden: Saiyajin Zetsumetsu Keikaku	Tose	Bandai	August 6, 1993^{JP}	August 6, 1993	Unreleased	Unreleased
Dragon Ball Z II: Gekishin Freeza	Tose	Bandai	August 10, 1991^{JP}	August 10, 1991	Unreleased	Unreleased
Dragon Ball Z III: Ressen Jinzōningen	Tose	Bandai	August 7, 1992^{JP}	August 7, 1992	Unreleased	Unreleased
Dragon Buster	Tose	Namco	January 7, 1987^{JP}	January 7, 1987	Unreleased	Unreleased
Dragon Buster II: Yami no Fūin	Tose	Namco	April 27, 1989^{JP}	April 27, 1989	Unreleased	Unreleased
Dragon Fighter	Natsume	Towa Chiki^{JP} SOFEL^{NA}	August 10, 1990^{JP}	August 10, 1990	January 1992	Unreleased
Dragon Power; Dragon Ball: Shenlong no Nazo^{JP} Dragon Ball: Le Secret du Dragon^{FR/ESP}	Tose	Bandai	November 27, 1986^{JP}	November 27, 1986	March 1988	July 18, 1990
Dragon Scroll	Konami	Konami	December 4, 1987^{JP}	December 4, 1987	Unreleased	Unreleased
Dragon Spirit: The New Legend	Now Production	Namco^{JP} Bandai^{NA}	April 14, 1989^{JP}	April 14, 1989	June 1990	Unreleased
Dragon Warrior; Dragon Quest^{JP}	Chunsoft	Enix^{JP} Nintendo^{NA}	May 27, 1986^{JP}	May 27, 1986	August 1989	Unreleased
Dragon Warrior II; Dragon Quest II: Akuryō no Kamigami^{JP}	Chunsoft	Enix	January 26, 1987^{JP}	January 26, 1987	September 1990	Unreleased
Dragon Warrior III; Dragon Quest III: Soshite Densetsu e...^{JP}	Chunsoft	Enix	February 10, 1988^{JP}	February 10, 1988	March 1992	Unreleased
Dragon Warrior IV; Dragon Quest IV: Michibikareshi Monotachi^{JP}	Chunsoft	Enix	February 11, 1990^{JP}	February 11, 1990	October 1992	Unreleased
Dragon Wars	Kemco	Kemco	August 9, 1991^{JP}	August 9, 1991	Unreleased	Unreleased
Dragon's Lair	MotiveTime	CSG Imagesoft^{NA} Epic/Sony Records^{JP} Elite Systems^{PAL}	December 1990^{NA}	September 20, 1991	December 1990	January 3, 1992
Dream Master	Birthday	Namco	September 22, 1992^{JP}	September 22, 1992	Unreleased	Unreleased
Dropzone	Eurocom	Mindscape	1992^{PAL}	Unreleased	Unreleased	1992
Duck Hunt	Nintendo R&D1; Intelligent Systems	Nintendo	April 21, 1984^{JP}	April 21, 1984	October 18, 1985	August 15, 1987
DuckTales	Capcom	Capcom	October 1989^{NA}	January 26, 1990	October 1989	December 14, 1990
DuckTales 2	Capcom	Capcom	April 23, 1993^{JP}	April 23, 1993	June 1993	November 18, 1993
Dungeon Kid	Pixel	Quest	August 31, 1990^{JP}	August 31, 1990	Unreleased	Unreleased
Dungeon Magic: Sword of the Elements	Natsume	Natsume^{JP} Taito^{NA}	November 10, 1989^{JP}	November 10, 1989	July 1990	Unreleased
Dusty Diamond's All-Star Softball; Softball Tengoku^{JP}	Tose	Tonkin House^{JP} Broderbund^{NA}	October 27, 1989^{JP}	October 27, 1989	July 1990	Unreleased
Dynamite Bowl	Softvision	Toshiba EMI	May 24, 1987^{JP}	May 24, 1987	Unreleased	Unreleased
Dynowarz: Destruction of Spondylus	Advance Communication Company	Bandai	April 1990^{NA}	Unreleased	April 1990	Unreleased
Eggerland: Meikyū no Fukkatsu	HAL Laboratory	HAL Laboratory	August 9, 1988^{JP}	August 9, 1988	Unreleased	Unreleased
Egypt	Human Creative	Human Entertainment	May 31, 1991^{JP}	May 31, 1991	Unreleased	Unreleased
Elevator Action	Micronics	Taito	June 28, 1985^{JP}	June 28, 1985	August 1987	Unreleased
Eliminator Boat Duel	Sculptured Software; Radioactive Software	Electro Brain^{NA} Storm^{PAL}	November 1991^{NA}	Unreleased	November 1991	April 29, 1993
Elite	David Braben; Ian Bell	Imagineer	1991^{PAL}	Unreleased	Unreleased	1991
Elnark no Zaihou	Towa Chiki	Towa Chiki	August 10, 1987^{JP}	August 10, 1987	Unreleased	Unreleased
Elysion	SystemSoft	Tokyo Shoseki	April 28, 1988^{JP}	April 28, 1988	Unreleased	Unreleased
Emoyan no 10-bai Pro Yakyū	Hect	Hect	December 19, 1989^{JP}	December 19, 1989	Unreleased	Unreleased
Erika to Satoru no Yume Bōken	Atlus	Namco	September 27, 1988^{JP}	September 27, 1988	Unreleased	Unreleased
Esper Bōkentai	NMK	Jaleco	October 13, 1987^{JP}	October 13, 1987	Unreleased	Unreleased
Esper Dream 2: Arata naru Tatakai	Konami	Konami	June 26, 1992^{JP}	June 26, 1992	Unreleased	Unreleased
Excitebike	Nintendo R&D4	Nintendo	November 30, 1984^{JP}	November 30, 1984	October 18, 1985	September 1, 1986
Exciting Boxing	Human Entertainment	Konami	December 16, 1987^{JP}	December 16, 1987	Unreleased	Unreleased
Exed Exes	Micronics	Tokuma Shoten	December 21, 1985^{JP}	December 21, 1985	Unreleased	Unreleased
Exerion	Tose	Jaleco	February 11, 1985^{JP}	February 11, 1985	Unreleased	Unreleased
F-15 Strike Eagle	MicroProse	MicroProse	February 1992^{NA}	Unreleased	February 1992	February 18, 1993
F-117A Stealth Fighter	MicroProse	MicroProse	December 1992^{NA}	Unreleased	December 1992	Unreleased
F1 Circus	Make Software	Nichibutsu	February 7, 1992^{JP}	February 7, 1992	Unreleased	Unreleased
F1 Race	HAL Laboratory	Nintendo	November 2, 1984^{JP}	November 2, 1984	Unreleased	Unreleased
Famicom Dōbutsu Seitai Zukan! Katte ni Shirokuma: Mori o Sukue no Maki!	Graphic Research	CBS Sony Group	December 15, 1989^{JP}	December 15, 1989	Unreleased	Unreleased
Famicom Igo Nyuumon	Home Data	I'MAX	November 29, 1991^{JP}	November 29, 1991	Unreleased	Unreleased
Famicom Jump: Hero Retsuden	Tose	Bandai	February 15, 1989^{JP}	February 15, 1989	Unreleased	Unreleased
Famicom Jump II: Saikyō no Shichinin	Chunsoft	Bandai	December 2, 1991^{JP}	December 2, 1991	Unreleased	Unreleased
Famicom Meijinsen	Alpha Denshi	SNK	September 2, 1988^{JP}	September 2, 1988	Unreleased	Unreleased
Famicom Shogi: Ryū-Ō-Sen	Home Data	I'MAX	February 15, 1991^{JP}	February 15, 1991	Unreleased	Unreleased
Famicom Top Management	Koei	Koei	December 12, 1990^{JP}	December 12, 1990	Unreleased	Unreleased
Famicom Wars	Nintendo R&D1; Intelligent Systems	Nintendo	August 12, 1988^{JP}	August 12, 1988	Unreleased	Unreleased
Famicom Yakyū-ban	Sakata SAS	Epoch	December 15, 1989^{JP}	December 15, 1989	Unreleased	Unreleased
Family Circuit	Game Studio	Namco	January 6, 1988^{JP}	January 6, 1988	Unreleased	Unreleased
Family Circuit '91	Game Studio	Namco	July 19, 1991^{JP}	July 19, 1991	Unreleased	Unreleased
Family Feud	Beam Software	GameTek	May 1991^{NA}	Unreleased	May 1991	Unreleased
Family Jockey	Namco	Namco	April 24, 1987^{JP}	April 24, 1987	Unreleased	Unreleased
Family Mahjong	Nichibutsu	Namco	August 11, 1987^{JP}	August 11, 1987	Unreleased	Unreleased
Family Mahjong II: Shanghai he no Michi	Nichibutsu	Namco	November 25, 1988^{JP}	November 25, 1988	Unreleased	Unreleased
Family Quiz 4-nin wa Rival	Athena	Athena	November 16, 1988^{JP}	November 16, 1988	Unreleased	Unreleased
Family Tennis	Namco	Namco	December 11, 1987^{JP}	December 11, 1987	Unreleased	Unreleased
Family Trainer: Fūun! Takeshi Jō Two	Human Entertainment	Bandai	December 20, 1988^{JP}	December 20, 1988	Unreleased	Unreleased
Family Trainer: Jogging Race	Now Production	Bandai	May 28, 1987^{JP}	May 28, 1987	Unreleased	Unreleased
Family Trainer: Meiro Daisakusen	Human Entertainment	Bandai	July 31, 1987^{JP}	July 31, 1987	Unreleased	Unreleased
Family Trainer: Rai Rai! Kyonshis: Baby Kyonshi no Amida Daibōken		Bandai	January 26, 1989^{JP}	January 26, 1989	Unreleased	Unreleased
Family Trainer: Totsugeki! Fūun Takeshi Jō		Bandai	December 28, 1987^{JP}	December 28, 1987	Unreleased	Unreleased
Famista '89 Kaimaku Ban!!	Namco	Namco	July 28, 1989^{JP}	July 28, 1989	Unreleased	Unreleased
Famista '90	Namco	Namco	December 19, 1989^{JP}	December 19, 1989	Unreleased	Unreleased
Famista '91	Namco	Namco	December 21, 1990^{JP}	December 21, 1990	Unreleased	Unreleased
Famista '92	Namco	Namco	December 20, 1991^{JP}	December 20, 1991	Unreleased	Unreleased
Famista '93	Namco	Namco	December 22, 1992^{JP}	December 22, 1992	Unreleased	Unreleased
Famista '94	Namco	Namco	December 1, 1993^{JP}	December 1, 1993	Unreleased	Unreleased
Fantasy Zone	Sunsoft	Sunsoft	July 20, 1987^{JP}	July 20, 1987	Unreleased	Unreleased
Fantasy Zone II: The Tears of Opa-Opa	Sanritsu	Sunsoft	December 20, 1988^{JP}	December 20, 1988	Unreleased	Unreleased
Faria: A World of Mystery and Danger!	Game Arts	Hi-Score^{JP} Nexoft^{NA}	July 21, 1989^{JP}	July 21, 1989	June 1991	Unreleased
Faxanadu	Hudson Soft	Hudson Soft^{JP} Nintendo^{NA/PAL}	November 16, 1987^{JP}	November 16, 1987	July 1989	December 28, 1990
Felix the Cat	Shimada Kikaku	Hudson Soft	October 1992^{NA}	Unreleased	October 1992	1992
Ferrari Grand Prix Challenge; Ferrari^{JP}	System 3	Coconuts Japan^{JP} Acclaim Entertainment^{NA/PAL}	June 1992^{NA}	November 13, 1992	June 1992	1992
Fester's Quest	Sunsoft	Sunsoft	September 1989^{NA}	Unreleased	September 1989	September 14, 1990
Field Combat	Tose	Jaleco	July 9, 1985^{JP}	July 9, 1985	Unreleased	Unreleased
Fighting Road	Thinking Rabbit	Toei Animation	December 13, 1988^{JP}	December 13, 1988	Unreleased	Unreleased
Final Fantasy	Square	Square^{JP} Nintendo^{NA}	December 18, 1987^{JP}	December 18, 1987	July 1990	Unreleased
Final Fantasy II	Square	Square	December 17, 1988^{JP}	December 17, 1988	Unreleased	Unreleased
Final Fantasy III	Square	Square	April 27, 1990^{JP}	April 27, 1990	Unreleased	Unreleased
Final Lap	Arc System Works	Namco	August 12, 1988^{JP}	August 12, 1988	Unreleased	Unreleased
Fire Emblem: Shadow Dragon and the Blade of Light	Intelligent Systems; Nintendo R&D1	Nintendo	April 20, 1990^{JP}	April 20, 1990	Unreleased	Unreleased
Fire Emblem Gaiden	Intelligent Systems	Nintendo	March 14, 1992^{JP}	March 14, 1992	Unreleased	Unreleased
Firework Thrower Kantaro's 53 Stations of the Tokaido	Sunsoft	Sunsoft	July 3, 1986^{JP}	July 3, 1986	Unreleased	Unreleased
Fisher-Price: Firehouse Rescue	Imagineering	GameTek	March 1992^{NA}	Unreleased	March 1992	Unreleased
Fisher-Price: I Can Remember	Beam Software	GameTek	March 1990^{NA}	Unreleased	March 1990	Unreleased
Fisher-Price: Perfect Fit	Beam Software	GameTek	March 1990^{NA}	Unreleased	March 1990	Unreleased
Fist of the North Star; Hokuto no Ken 2^{JP}	Shouei System	Toei Animation^{JP} Taxan^{NA}	April 17, 1987^{JP}	April 17, 1987	April 1989	Unreleased
Flappy	dB-SOFT	dB-SOFT	June 14, 1985^{JP}	June 14, 1985	Unreleased	Unreleased
Fleet Commander	ASCII	ASCII	March 29, 1988^{JP}	March 29, 1988	Unreleased	Unreleased
Flight of the Intruder; Phantom Air Mission^{PAL}	Imagineering	Mindscape^{NA} Activision^{PAL}	May 1991^{NA}	Unreleased	May 1991	1991
The Flintstones: The Rescue of Dino & Hoppy	Taito; Sol Corporation	Taito	December 1991^{NA}	August 7, 1992	December 1991	April 30, 1992
The Flintstones: The Surprise at Dinosaur Peak	Taito; Sol Corporation	Taito	February 24, 1994^{PAL}	Unreleased	August 1994	February 24, 1994
Flipull	Daiei Seisakusho	Taito	December 15, 1989^{JP}	December 15, 1989	Unreleased	Unreleased
Flying Dragon: The Secret Scroll; Hiryū no Ken: Ōgi no Sho^{JP}	Culture Brain	Culture Brain	February 14, 1987^{JP}	February 14, 1987	August 1989	Unreleased
Flying Hero	Aicom	Epic/Sony Records	February 17, 1989^{JP}	February 17, 1989	Unreleased	Unreleased
Flying Warriors	Culture Brain	Culture Brain	February 1991^{NA}	Unreleased	February 1991	Unreleased
Formation Z	Hect	Jaleco	April 4, 1985^{JP}	April 4, 1985	Unreleased	Unreleased
Formula 1 Sensation; F-1 Sensation^{JP}	Konami	Konami^{JP} Palcom Software^{PAL}	January 29, 1993^{JP}	January 29, 1993	Unreleased	February 23, 1993
Formula One: Built to Win	Winkysoft	SETA	November 1990^{NA}	Unreleased	November 1990	Unreleased
Frankenstein: The Monster Returns	Tose	Bandai	July 1991^{NA}	Unreleased	July 1991	Unreleased
Freedom Force	Sunsoft	Sunsoft	April 1988^{NA}	Unreleased	April 1988	Unreleased
Friday the 13th	Atlus	LJN	February 1989^{NA}	Unreleased	February 1989	Unreleased
Front Line	Taito	Taito	August 1, 1985^{JP}	August 1, 1985	Unreleased	Unreleased
Fun House	Realtime Associates	Hi Tech Expressions	January 1991^{NA}	Unreleased	January 1991	Unreleased
Fushigi no Umi no Nadia	Advance Communication Company	Toho	March 15, 1991^{JP}	March 15, 1991	Unreleased	Unreleased
Fuzzical Fighter	Make Software	Sigma Enterprises	May 17, 1991^{JP}	May 17, 1991	Unreleased	Unreleased
G.I. Joe	KID	Taxan	January 1991^{NA}	Unreleased	January 1991	Unreleased
G.I. Joe: The Atlantis Factor	KID	Capcom	March 1992^{NA}	Unreleased	March 1992	Unreleased
Galaga: Demons of Death; Galaga^{JP/PAL}	Namco	Namco^{JP} Bandai^{NA/PAL}	February 15, 1985^{JP}	February 15, 1985	September 1988	July 4, 1989
Galaxian	Namco	Namco	September 7, 1984^{JP}	September 7, 1984	Unreleased	Unreleased
Galaxy 5000: Racing in the 51st Century	Activision	Activision	February 1991^{NA}	Unreleased	February 1991	1991
Game Party	C-Dream	Coconuts Japan	August 3, 1990^{JP}	August 3, 1990	Unreleased	Unreleased
Ganbare Goemon! Karakuri Dōchū	Konami	Konami	July 30, 1986^{JP}	July 30, 1986	Unreleased	Unreleased
Ganbare Goemon 2	Konami	Konami	January 4, 1989^{JP}	January 4, 1989	Unreleased	Unreleased
Ganbare Goemon Gaiden: Kieta Ōgon Kiseru	Konami	Konami	January 5, 1990^{JP}	January 5, 1990	Unreleased	Unreleased
Ganbare Goemon Gaiden 2: Tenka no Zaihō	Konami	Konami	January 3, 1992^{JP}	January 3, 1992	Unreleased	Unreleased
Ganbare Pennant Race!	Konami	Konami	February 28, 1989^{JP}	February 28, 1989	Unreleased	Unreleased
Ganso Saiyūki: Super Monkey Daibōken	Techno Quest	VAP	November 21, 1986^{JP}	November 21, 1986	Unreleased	Unreleased
Gargoyle's Quest II: The Demon Darkness; Red Arremer II^{JP}	Capcom	Capcom	July 17, 1992^{JP}	July 17, 1992	October 1992	June 17, 1993
Gauntlet	Tengen	Tengen	July 1988^{NA}	Unreleased	July 1988 (Note: This game was first released on licensed cartridges, but was re-released on unlicensed cartridges. This was due to the unlicensed version's publisher not wanting to pay Nintendo's license fees after discovering a means to bypass Nintendo's lockout chip.)	Unreleased
Gauntlet II	Eastridge Technology	Mindscape	September 1990^{NA}	Unreleased	September 1990	April 25, 1991
Gegege no Kitarō 2: Yōkai Gundan no Chōsen	Tose	Bandai	December 22, 1987^{JP}	December 22, 1987	Unreleased	Unreleased
Geimos	Micronics	ASCII	August 28, 1985^{JP}	August 28, 1985	Unreleased	Unreleased
Gekitotsu Yonku Battle	Tamtex	Irem	November 17, 1989^{JP}	November 17, 1989	Unreleased	Unreleased
Gemfire; Royal Blood^{JP}	Koei	Koei	August 29, 1991^{JP}	August 29, 1991	March 1992	Unreleased
Genghis Khan	Koei	Koei	April 20, 1989^{JP}	April 20, 1989	January 1990	Unreleased
Genpei Tōma Den	Namco	Namco	October 21, 1988^{JP}	October 21, 1988	Unreleased	Unreleased
George Foreman's KO Boxing	Beam Software	Acclaim Entertainment	December 1992^{NA}	Unreleased	December 1992	1992
Getsu Fūma Den	Konami	Konami	July 7, 1987^{JP}	July 7, 1987	Unreleased	Unreleased
Ghostbusters	Bits Laboratory	Tokuma Shoten^{JP} Activision^{NA}	September 22, 1986^{JP}	September 22, 1986	October 1988	Unreleased
Ghostbusters II	Imagineering	Activision	April 1990^{NA}	Unreleased	April 1990	December 7, 1990
Ghost Lion; White Lion Densetsu: Pyramid no Kanata ni^{JP}	Kemco	Kemco	July 14, 1989^{JP}	July 14, 1989	October 1992	Unreleased
Ghosts 'n Goblins	Micronics	Capcom	June 13, 1986^{JP}	June 13, 1986	November 1986	March 23, 1989
Ghoul School	Imagineering	Electro Brain	March 1992^{NA}	Unreleased	March 1992	Unreleased
Gimme a Break: Shijō Saikyō no Quiz Ō Ketteisen	Outback	Yonezawa PR21	December 13, 1991^{JP}	December 13, 1991	Unreleased	Unreleased
Gimme a Break: Shijō Saikyō no Quiz Ō Ketteisen 2	Outback	Yonezawa PR21	August 28, 1992^{JP}	August 28, 1992	Unreleased	Unreleased
Ginga Eiyū Densetsu	Tokuma Shoten	Kemco	December 21, 1988^{JP}	December 21, 1988	Unreleased	Unreleased
Ginga no Sannin	Pax Softnica	Nintendo	December 15, 1987^{JP}	December 15, 1987	Unreleased	Unreleased
Goal! Moero!! Pro Soccer^{JP}	Tose	Jaleco	December 23, 1988^{JP}	December 23, 1988	October 1989	March 24, 1994
Goal! Two; Goal !!^{JP} Eric Cantona Football Challenge Goal! 2^{FR}	Tose	Jaleco	September 25, 1992^{JP}	September 25, 1992	November 1992	November 15, 1992
Godzilla: Monster of Monsters!	Compile	Toho	December 9, 1988^{JP}	December 9, 1988	October 1989	1991
Godzilla 2: War of the Monsters	Compile	Toho	February 1992^{NA}	Unreleased	February 1992	Unreleased
Golf	Nintendo R&D2; HAL Laboratory	Nintendo	May 1, 1984^{JP}	May 1, 1984	October 18, 1985	November 15, 1986
The Golf '92	G.O.1	G.O.1	July 3, 1992^{JP}	July 3, 1992	Unreleased	Unreleased
Golf Club: Birdie Rush	Data East	Data East	December 9, 1987^{JP}	December 9, 1987	Unreleased	Unreleased
Golf Grand Slam	Tose	Hect^{JP} Atlus^{NA}	January 31, 1991^{JP}	January 31, 1991	December 1991	Unreleased
Golf-kko Open	Tose	Taito	November 25, 1989^{JP}	November 25, 1989	Unreleased	Unreleased
Golgo 13: Top Secret Episode; Golgo 13 - Dai 1 Shou - Kamigami no Tasogare^{JP}	Vic Tokai	Vic Tokai	March 26, 1988^{JP}	March 26, 1988	September 1988	Unreleased
Gomoku Narabe Renju	Nintendo	Nintendo	August 27, 1983^{JP}	August 27, 1983	Unreleased	Unreleased
The Goonies	Konami	Konami	February 21, 1986^{JP}	February 21, 1986	Unreleased	Unreleased
The Goonies II	Konami	Konami	March 18, 1987^{JP}	March 18, 1987	November 1987	December 19, 1988
Gorby no Pipeline Daisakusen	Compile	Tokuma Shoten	April 12, 1991^{JP}	April 12, 1991	Unreleased	Unreleased
The Gorilla Man	Pixel	Yonezawa PR21	April 28, 1993^{JP}	April 28, 1993	Unreleased	Unreleased
Gotcha! The Sport!	Atlus	LJN	November 1987^{NA}	Unreleased	November 1987	Unreleased
Gozonji: Yaji Kita Chin Douchuu	Hyperware	HAL Laboratory	November 7, 1989^{JP}	November 7, 1989	Unreleased	Unreleased
Gradius	Konami	Konami	April 25, 1986^{JP}	April 25, 1986	December 1986	November 30, 1988
Gradius II	Konami	Konami	December 16, 1988^{JP}	December 16, 1988	Unreleased	Unreleased
Grand Master	Soft Machine	Varie	February 26, 1991^{JP}	February 26, 1991	Unreleased	Unreleased
Great Battle Cyber	Arc System Works	Banpresto	December 25, 1992^{JP}	December 25, 1992	Unreleased	Unreleased
Great Deal	Hect	Hect	October 25, 1991^{JP}	October 25, 1991	Unreleased	Unreleased
The Great Waldo Search	Radiance Software	THQ	December 1992^{NA}	Unreleased	December 1992	Unreleased
Greg Norman's Golf Power	Gremlin Interactive	Virgin Games	July 1992^{NA}	Unreleased	July 1992	Unreleased
Gremlins 2: The New Batch	Sunsoft	Sunsoft	October 1990^{NA}	December 14, 1990	October 1990	February 21, 1991
The Guardian Legend; Guardic Gaiden^{JP}	Compile	Irem^{JP} Broderbund^{NA} Nintendo^{PAL}	February 5, 1988^{JP}	February 5, 1988	April 1989	February 20, 1992
Guerrilla War; Guevara^{JP}	SNK	SNK	December 26, 1988^{JP}	December 26, 1988	June 1989	1989
Gumshoe	Nintendo R&D1	Nintendo	August 1986^{NA}	Unreleased	August 1986	June 15, 1988
Gun-Nac	Compile	Tonkin House^{JP} ASCII^{NA}	October 5, 1990^{JP}	October 5, 1990	September 1991	Unreleased
Gun.Smoke	Capcom	Capcom	February 1988^{NA}	Unreleased	February 1988	June 15, 1988
Gunhed: Aratanaru Tatakai	Toho	Varie	April 13, 1990^{JP}	April 13, 1990	Unreleased	Unreleased
Gyrodine	Human Entertainment	Taito	March 13, 1986^{JP}	March 13, 1986	Unreleased	Unreleased
Gyromite; Robot Gyro^{JP}	Nintendo R&D1; Intelligent Systems	Nintendo	August 13, 1985^{JP}	August 13, 1985	October 18, 1985	September 1, 1986
Gyruss	Konami	Ultra Games	February 1989^{NA}	Unreleased	February 1989	Unreleased
Gyuwambler Jiko Chūshinha	Game Arts	Asmik	November 11, 1988^{JP}	November 11, 1988	Unreleased	Unreleased
Gyuwambler Jiko Chūshinha 2	Game Arts	Asmik	December 7, 1990^{JP}	December 7, 1990	Unreleased	Unreleased
Haja no Fūin	Kogado Software Products	ASCII	October 23, 1987^{JP}	October 23, 1987	Unreleased	Unreleased
Hammerin' Harry; Daiku no Gen-san^{JP}	Tamtex	Irem	November 15, 1991^{JP}	November 15, 1991	Unreleased	June 23, 1994
Hana no Star Kaidō	Victor Musical Industries	Victor Musical Industries	March 17, 1987^{JP}	March 17, 1987	Unreleased	Unreleased
Hanjuku Hero	Square	Square	December 2, 1988^{JP}	December 2, 1988	Unreleased	Unreleased
Harlem Globetrotters	Softie	GameTek	March 1991^{NA}	Unreleased	March 1991	Unreleased
Hatris	Bullet-Proof Software	Bullet-Proof Software	July 6, 1990^{JP}	July 6, 1990	April 1992	Unreleased
Hayauchi Super Igo	Home Data	Namco	March 3, 1989^{JP}	March 3, 1989	Unreleased	Unreleased
Heavy Barrel	Data East	Data East	March 2, 1990^{JP}	March 2, 1990	March 1990	Unreleased
Heavy Shreddin'; Snowboard Challenge^{PAL}	Imagineering	Parker Brothers^{NA} Activision^{PAL}	June 1990^{NA}	Unreleased	June 1990	1990
Heisei Tensai Bakabon	Namco	Namco	December 6, 1991^{JP}	December 6, 1991	Unreleased	Unreleased
Hello Kitty no Hanabatake	Shimada Kikaku	Character Soft	December 11, 1992^{JP}	December 11, 1992	Unreleased	Unreleased
Hello Kitty World	Nintendo R&D1; Pax Softnica	Character Soft	March 27, 1992^{JP}	March 27, 1992	Unreleased	Unreleased
Hercules no Eikō II: Titan no Metsubō	Data East	Data East	December 23, 1989^{JP}	December 23, 1989	Unreleased	Unreleased
Hi no Tori Hououhen: Gaou no Bouken	Konami	Konami	January 4, 1987^{JP}	January 4, 1987	Unreleased	Unreleased
Higemaru Makaijima - Nanatsu no Shima Daibōken	Capcom	Capcom	April 14, 1987^{JP}	April 14, 1987	Unreleased	Unreleased
High Speed	Rare	Tradewest	July 1991^{NA}	Unreleased	July 1991	April 28, 1994
Hikari no Senshi Photon: The Ultimate Game on Planet Earth	Advance Communication Company	Takara	August 28, 1987^{JP}	August 28, 1987	Unreleased	Unreleased
Hirake! Ponkikki	Minato Giken	Takara	April 17, 1992^{JP}	April 17, 1992	Unreleased	Unreleased
Hiryū no Ken II: Dragon no Tsubasa	Culture Brain	Culture Brain	July 29, 1988^{JP}	July 29, 1988	Unreleased	Unreleased
Hiryu no Ken III: 5 Nin no Ryū Senshi	Culture Brain	Culture Brain	July 6, 1990^{JP}	July 6, 1990	Unreleased	Unreleased
Hiryū no Ken Special: Fighting Wars	Culture Brain	Culture Brain	June 21, 1991^{JP}	June 21, 1991	Unreleased	Unreleased
Hissatsu Dōjō Yaburi	Sigma Enterprises	Sigma Enterprises	July 18, 1989^{JP}	July 18, 1989	Unreleased	Unreleased
Hissatsu Shigotonin	Arc System Works	Banpresto	December 15, 1990^{JP}	December 15, 1990	Unreleased	Unreleased
Hogan's Alley	Nintendo R&D1; Intelligent Systems	Nintendo	June 12, 1984^{JP}	June 12, 1984	October 18, 1985	December 15, 1987
Hokkaidō Rensa Satsujin: Okhotsk ni Kiyu	Pax Softnica	Loginsoft	June 27, 1987^{JP}	June 27, 1987	Unreleased	Unreleased
Hokuto no Ken	Shouei System	Toei Animation	August 10, 1986^{JP}	August 10, 1986	Unreleased	Unreleased
Hokuto no Ken 3: Shin Seiki Sōzō: Seiken Retsuden	Shouei System	Toei Animation	October 19, 1989^{JP}	October 19, 1989	Unreleased	Unreleased
Hokuto no Ken 4: Shichisei Hakenden: Hokuto Shinken no Kanata he	Shouei System	Toei Animation	March 29, 1991^{JP}	March 29, 1991	Unreleased	Unreleased
Hollywood Squares	Rare	GameTek	September 1989^{NA}	Unreleased	September 1989	Unreleased
Holy Diver	Irem	Irem	April 28, 1989^{JP}	April 28, 1989	Unreleased	Unreleased
Home Alone	Bethesda Softworks	THQ	October 1991^{NA}	Unreleased	October 1991	Unreleased
Home Alone 2: Lost in New York	Imagineering	THQ	October 1992^{NA}	Unreleased	October 1992	1992
Home Run Night	Data East	Data East	March 31, 1989^{JP}	March 31, 1989	Unreleased	Unreleased
Home Run Night '90	Data East	Data East	July 24, 1990^{JP}	July 24, 1990	Unreleased	Unreleased
Honō no Tōkyūji: Dodge Danpei	Sunsoft	Sunsoft	March 27, 1992^{JP}	March 27, 1992	Unreleased	Unreleased
Honō no Tōkyūji: Dodge Danpei 2	Sunsoft	Sunsoft	March 26, 1993^{JP}	March 26, 1993	Unreleased	Unreleased
Honshogi: Naitou Kudan Shogi Hiden	SETA	SETA	August 10, 1985^{JP}	August 10, 1985	Unreleased	Unreleased
Hook	Painting by Numbers	Epic/Sony Records^{JP} Sony Imagesoft^{NA} Ocean Software^{PAL}	March 27, 1992^{JP}	March 27, 1992	April 1992	1992
Hoops; Moero!! Junior Basket - Two on Two^{JP}	Aicom	Jaleco	November 22, 1988^{JP}	November 22, 1988	June 1989	1989
Hoshi Wo Miru Hito	Another	Hot-B	October 27, 1987^{JP}	October 27, 1987	Unreleased	Unreleased
Hototogisu	Tamtex	Irem	August 19, 1988^{JP}	August 19, 1988	Unreleased	Unreleased
Hottāman no Chitei Tanken	Use Corporation	Use Corporation	December 6, 1986^{JP}	December 6, 1986	Unreleased	Unreleased
Hudson Hawk	Special FX Software	Epic/Sony Records^{JP} Sony Imagesoft^{NA} Ocean Software^{PAL}	December 27, 1991^{JP}	December 27, 1991	February 1992	1992
The Hunt for Red October	Beam Software	Hi Tech Expressions	January 1991^{NA}	Unreleased	January 1991	1992
Hyakkiyakou	Use Corporation	Use Corporation	February 22, 1989^{JP}	February 22, 1989	Unreleased	Unreleased
Hyaku no Sekai no Monogatari: The Tales on a Watery Wilderness	ASK	ASK	August 9, 1991^{JP}	August 9, 1991	Unreleased	Unreleased
Hydlide; Hydlide Special^{JP}	T&E Soft	Toshiba EMI^{JP} FCI^{NA}	March 18, 1986^{JP}	March 18, 1986	June 1989	Unreleased
Hydlide 3: Yami kara no Hōmonsha	Jorudan	Namco	February 17, 1989^{JP}	February 17, 1989	Unreleased	Unreleased
Hyokkori Hyōtanjima: Nazo no Kaizokusen	Sol Corporation	Yutaka	April 25, 1992^{JP}	April 25, 1992	Unreleased	Unreleased
Hyper Sports	Konami	Konami	September 27, 1985^{JP}	September 27, 1985	Unreleased	Unreleased
I Love Softball	Marionette	Coconuts Japan	December 19, 1989^{JP}	December 19, 1989	Unreleased	Unreleased
Ice Climber	Nintendo R&D1	Nintendo	January 30, 1985^{JP}	January 30, 1985	October 18, 1985	September 1, 1986
Ice Hockey	Nintendo R&D4	Nintendo	March 1988^{NA}	Unreleased	March 1988	April 15, 1988
Ide Yōsuke Meijin no Jissen Mahjong	Capcom	Capcom	September 24, 1987^{JP}	September 24, 1987	Unreleased	Unreleased
Ide Yōsuke Meijin no Jissen Mahjong II	Capcom	Capcom	February 22, 1991^{JP}	February 22, 1991	Unreleased	Unreleased
Idol Hakkenden	Natsume	Towa Chiki	September 14, 1989^{JP}	September 14, 1989	Unreleased	Unreleased
Igo Meikan	Hect	Hect	January 10, 1990^{JP}	January 10, 1990	Unreleased	Unreleased
Igo Shinan	Hect	Hect	July 14, 1989^{JP}	July 14, 1989	Unreleased	Unreleased
Igo Shinan '91	Hect	Hect	July 5, 1991^{JP}	July 5, 1991	Unreleased	Unreleased
Igo Shinan '92	Hect	Hect	March 10, 1992^{JP}	March 10, 1992	Unreleased	Unreleased
Igo Shinan '93	Hect	Hect	November 27, 1992^{JP}	November 27, 1992	Unreleased	Unreleased
Igo Shinan '94	Hect	Hect	December 17, 1993^{JP}	December 17, 1993	Unreleased	Unreleased
Igo: Kyū Roban Taikyoku	Bullet-Proof Software	Bullet-Proof Software	August 11, 1987^{JP}	August 11, 1987	Unreleased	Unreleased
Ikari Warriors	Micronics	K Amusement^{JP} SNK^{NA/PAL}	November 26, 1986^{JP}	November 26, 1986	May 1987	August 10, 1989
Ikari Warriors II: Victory Road	Micronics	K Amusement^{JP} SNK^{NA}	April 16, 1988^{JP}	April 16, 1988	April 1988	Unreleased
Ikari Warriors III: The Rescue	Micronics	K Amusement^{JP} SNK^{NA}	March 16, 1990^{JP}	March 16, 1990	February 1991	Unreleased
Ike Ike! Nekketsu Hockey Bu: Subette Koronde Dairantō	Technōs Japan	Technōs Japan	February 7, 1992^{JP}	February 7, 1992	Unreleased	Unreleased
Ikinari Musician	Musical Plan	Tokyo Shoseki	March 5, 1987^{JP}	March 5, 1987	Unreleased	Unreleased
Ikki	Tose	Sunsoft	November 28, 1985^{JP}	November 28, 1985	Unreleased	Unreleased
Image Fight		Irem	March 16, 1990^{JP}	March 16, 1990	July 1990	Unreleased
The Immortal	Sandcastle	Electronic Arts	November 1990^{NA}	Unreleased	November 1990	Unreleased
The Incredible Crash Dummies	Software Creations	LJN	October 21, 1993^{PAL}	Unreleased	August 1994	October 21, 1993
Indora no Hikari	Kemco	Kemco	October 20, 1987^{JP}	October 20, 1987	Unreleased	Unreleased
Indiana Jones and the Last Crusade	Software Creations	Taito	March 1991^{NA}	Unreleased	March 1991	Unreleased
Indiana Jones and the Last Crusade; Indy: Indiana Jones and the Last Crusade^{PAL}	NMS Software	Ubi Soft	December 1993^{NA}	Unreleased	December 1993	1993
Indiana Jones and the Temple of Doom	Tengen	Mindscape	December 1988^{NA}	Unreleased	December 1988	Unreleased
Infiltrator	Eastridge Technology	Mindscape	January 1990^{NA}	Unreleased	January 1990	Unreleased
Insector X	Hot-B	Taito	September 21, 1990^{JP}	September 21, 1990	Unreleased	Unreleased
International Cricket	Beam Software	Laser Beam	1992^{AU}	Unreleased	Unreleased	1992
Iron Tank: The Invasion of Normandy; Great Tank^{JP}	SNK	SNK	July 29, 1988^{JP}	July 29, 1988	July 1988	1988
Ironsword: Wizards & Warriors II	Zippo Games	Acclaim Entertainment	December 1989^{NA}	Unreleased	December 1989	March 27, 1991
Isaki Shūgorō no Keiba Hisshōgaku	C-Lab	Imagineer	March 30, 1990^{JP}	March 30, 1990	Unreleased	Unreleased
Ishin no Arashi	Koei	Koei	September 15, 1990^{JP}	September 15, 1990	Unreleased	Unreleased
Isolated Warrior; Max Warrior: Wakusei Kaigenrei^{JP}	KID	VAP^{JP} NTVIC^{NA} Nintendo^{PAL}	February 15, 1991^{JP}	February 15, 1991	February 1991	1991
Itadaki Street: Watashi no Omise ni Yottette	Game Studio; Loginsoft	ASCII	March 21, 1991^{JP}	March 21, 1991	Unreleased	Unreleased
Ivan 'Ironman' Stewart's Super Off Road	Rare	Tradewest^{NA} Nintendo^{PAL}	April 1990^{NA}	Unreleased	April 1990	March 14, 1991
J-League Fighting Soccer	Graphic Research	IGS	June 19, 1993^{JP}	June 19, 1993	Unreleased	Unreleased
J-League Winning Goal	Graphic Research	Electronic Arts Victor	May 27, 1994^{JP}	May 27, 1994	Unreleased	Unreleased
Jack Nicklaus' Greatest 18 Holes of Major Championship Golf	Sculptured Software	Konami	March 1990^{NA}	Unreleased	March 1990	June 27, 1991
Jackal	Konami	Konami	October 1988^{NA}	Unreleased	October 1988	Unreleased
Jackie Chan's Action Kung Fu	Now Production	Hudson Soft	December 1990^{NA}	January 25, 1991	December 1990	1991
JaJaMaru Gekimaden: Maboroshi no Kinmajou	Jaleco	Jaleco	May 29, 1990^{JP}	May 29, 1990	Unreleased	Unreleased
JaJaMaru: Ninpō Chō	Jaleco	Jaleco	March 28, 1989^{JP}	March 28, 1989	Unreleased	Unreleased
JaJaMaru no Daibouken	Jaleco	Jaleco	August 22, 1986^{JP}	August 22, 1986	Unreleased	Unreleased
James Bond Jr.	Eurocom	THQ	November 1992^{NA}	Unreleased	November 1992	1992
Jangō	Orpheck	Victor Musical Industries	August 30, 1990^{JP}	August 30, 1990	Unreleased	Unreleased
Jarinko Chie: Bakudan Musume no Shiawase Sagashi	Konami	Konami	July 15, 1988^{JP}	July 15, 1988	Unreleased	Unreleased
Jaws	Atlus; Westone	LJN	November 1987^{NA}	Unreleased	November 1987	Unreleased
Jeopardy!	Rare	GameTek	September 1988^{NA}	Unreleased	September 1988	Unreleased
Jeopardy! 25th Anniversary Edition	Rare	GameTek	June 1990^{NA}	Unreleased	June 1990	Unreleased
Jeopardy! Junior Edition	Rare	GameTek	October 1989^{NA}	Unreleased	October 1989	Unreleased
Jesus: Kyōfu no Bio Monster	Chunsoft	King Records	March 17, 1989^{JP}	March 17, 1989	Unreleased	Unreleased
The Jetsons: Cogswell's Caper!	Natsume	Taito	December 1992^{NA}	April 23, 1993	December 1992	August 26, 1993
Jikuu Yuuden Debias	Now Production	Namco	November 27, 1987^{JP}	November 27, 1987	Unreleased	Unreleased
Jimmy Connors Tennis	NMS Software	Ubi Soft	August 3, 1993^{PAL}	Unreleased	November 1993	August 3, 1993
JJ: Tobidase Daisakusen Part II	Square	Square	December 7, 1987^{JP}	December 7, 1987	Unreleased	Unreleased
Joe & Mac; Joe & Mac: Caveman Ninja^{PAL}	Elite Systems	Data East^{NA} Elite Systems^{PAL}	December 1992^{NA}	Unreleased	December 1992	1992
John Elway's Quarterback	Rare	Tradewest	March 1989^{NA}	Unreleased	March 1989	Unreleased
Jongbou	SNK	K Amusement	July 18, 1987^{JP}	July 18, 1987	Unreleased	Unreleased
Jordan vs. Bird: One on One	Rare	Milton Bradley	August 1989^{NA}	Unreleased	August 1989	Unreleased
Journey to Silius; Rough World^{JP}	Sunsoft	Sunsoft	August 10, 1990^{JP}	August 10, 1990	September 1990	February 21, 1991
Joust	HAL Laboratory	HAL Laboratory	October 30, 1987^{JP}	October 30, 1987	October 1988	Unreleased
Joy Mech Fight	Nintendo R&D1	Nintendo	May 21, 1993^{JP}	May 21, 1993	Unreleased	Unreleased
Jumbo Ozaki no Hole in One Professional	HAL Laboratory	HAL Laboratory	February 1, 1988^{JP}	February 1, 1988	Unreleased	Unreleased
Jumpin' Kid: Jack to Mame no Ki Monogatari	Now Production	Asmik	December 19, 1990^{JP}	December 19, 1990	Unreleased	Unreleased
The Jungle Book	Eurocom	Virgin Interactive Entertainment	August 1994^{NA}	Unreleased	August 1994	August 25, 1994
Jūōki	Asmik	Asmik	July 20, 1990^{JP}	July 20, 1990	Unreleased	Unreleased
Jurassic Park	Ocean Software	Ocean Software	June 1993^{NA}	Unreleased	June 1993	December 28, 1993
Just Breed	Random House	Enix	December 15, 1992^{JP}	December 15, 1992	Unreleased	Unreleased
Juvei Quest	Birthday	Namco	January 4, 1991^{JP}	January 4, 1991	Unreleased	Unreleased
Kabuki: Quantum Fighter; Jigoku Gokuraku Maru^{JP}	Human Entertainment	Pack-In-Video^{JP} HAL Laboratory^{NA} Nintendo^{PAL}	December 21, 1990^{JP}	December 21, 1990	January 1991	February 20, 1992
Kabushiki Dōjō: The Stock Speculation	Tose	Hect	May 2, 1989^{JP}	May 2, 1989	Unreleased	Unreleased
Kaettekita! Gunjin Shogi: Nanya Sore!?	SOFEL	SOFEL	May 26, 1989^{JP}	May 26, 1989	Unreleased	Unreleased
Kagerou Densetsu	ITL	Pixel	May 11, 1990^{JP}	May 11, 1990	Unreleased	Unreleased
Kaguya Hime Densetsu	Micronics	Victor Musical Industries	December 16, 1988^{JP}	December 16, 1988	Unreleased	Unreleased
Kai no Bōken: The Quest of Ki	Game Studio	Namco	July 22, 1988^{JP}	July 22, 1988	Unreleased	Unreleased
Kaijū Monogatari	Birthday	Namco	November 18, 1988^{JP}	November 18, 1988	Unreleased	Unreleased
Kamen no Ninja Akakage	Shouei System	Toei Animation	May 20, 1988^{JP}	May 20, 1988	Unreleased	Unreleased
Kamen Rider Club: Gekitotsu Shocker Land	Tose	Bandai	February 3, 1988^{JP}	February 3, 1988	Unreleased	Unreleased
Kamen Rider SD: GranShocker no Yabō	Angel	Angel	January 22, 1993^{JP}	January 22, 1993	Unreleased	Unreleased
Karakuri Kengō Den Musashi Lord: Karakuri Jin Hashiru!	Tose	Yutaka	October 5, 1991^{JP}	October 5, 1991	Unreleased	Unreleased
Karaoke Studio	Tose	Bandai	July 30, 1987^{JP}	July 30, 1987	Unreleased	Unreleased
Karaoke Studio Senyou Cassette Vol. 1	Tose	Bandai	October 28, 1987^{JP}	October 28, 1987	Unreleased	Unreleased
Karaoke Studio Senyou Cassette Vol. 2	Tose	Bandai	February 18, 1988^{JP}	February 18, 1988	Unreleased	Unreleased
Karate Champ	Data East; Sakata SAS	Data East	December 1986^{NA}	Unreleased (Note: This game was later released on the Famicom Disk System)	December 1986	Unreleased
The Karate Kid	Atlus	LJN	November 1987^{NA}	Unreleased	November 1987	Unreleased
Karateka	Soft Pro	Soft Pro	December 5, 1985^{JP}	December 5, 1985	Unreleased	Unreleased
Karnov	Data East; Sakata SAS	Namco^{JP} Data East^{NA}	December 18, 1987^{JP}	December 18, 1987	January 1988	Unreleased
Kawa no Nushi Tsuri	Yuu Yuu	Pack-In-Video	August 10, 1990^{JP}	August 10, 1990	Unreleased	Unreleased
Keiba Simulation: Honmei	Nichibutsu	Nichibutsu	April 28, 1989^{JP}	April 28, 1989	Unreleased	Unreleased
Kekkyoku Nankyoku Daibōken	Konami	Konami	April 22, 1985^{JP}	April 22, 1985	Unreleased	Unreleased
Kero Kero Keroppi no Daibouken	Pax Softnica	Character Soft	March 29, 1991^{JP}	March 29, 1991	Unreleased	Unreleased
Kero Kero Keroppi no Daibouken 2: Donuts Ike ha Oosawagi	Shimada Kikaku	Character Soft	February 19, 1993^{JP}	February 19, 1993	Unreleased	Unreleased
Keroppi to Keroriinu no Splash Bomb!	Geo Factory	Character Soft	December 1, 1993^{JP}	December 1, 1993	Unreleased	Unreleased
Kick Master	KID	Taito	January 1992^{NA}	Unreleased	January 1992	Unreleased
Kick Off	Enigma Variations	Imagineer	July 22, 1992^{PAL}	Unreleased	Unreleased	July 22, 1992
Kickle Cubicle	Irem	Irem^{JP/NA} Nintendo^{PAL}	June 29, 1990^{JP}	June 29, 1990	September 1990	1990
Kid Icarus	Nintendo R&D1; Tose	Nintendo	February 15, 1987^{PAL}	Unreleased	July 1987	February 15, 1987
Kid Klown in Night Mayor World; Mickey Mouse III: Yume Fuusen^{JP}	Kemco	Kemco	September 30, 1992^{JP}	September 30, 1992	April 1993	Unreleased
Kid Kool; Kakefu-kun no Jump Tengoku - Speed Jigoku^{JP}	Vic Tokai	Vic Tokai	July 22, 1988^{JP}	July 22, 1988	March 1990	Unreleased
Kid Niki: Radical Ninja; Kaiketsu Yanchamaru^{JP}	Tose	Irem^{JP} Data East^{NA}	October 2, 1987^{JP}	October 2, 1987	November 1987	Unreleased
Kid Niki 2 Kaiketsu Yanchamaru 2: Karakuri Land^{JP}	Irem	Irem	August 30, 1991^{JP}	August 30, 1991	Unreleased	Unreleased
Kid Niki 3 Kaiketsu Yanchamaru 3: Taiketsu! Zōringen^{JP}	Micronics	Irem	March 30, 1993^{JP}	March 30, 1993	Unreleased	Unreleased
Kidō Senshi Z Gundam: Hot Scramble	Game Studio	Bandai	August 28, 1986^{JP}	August 28, 1986	Unreleased	Unreleased
King Kong 2: Ikari no Megaton Punch	Konami	Konami	December 18, 1986^{JP}	December 18, 1986	Unreleased	Unreleased
King of Kings	Atlus	Namco	December 9, 1988^{JP}	December 9, 1988	Unreleased	Unreleased
King's Knight	Square; Workss	Square	September 18, 1986^{JP}	September 18, 1986	September 1989	Unreleased
King's Quest V	Novotrade International	Konami	June 1992^{NA}	Unreleased	June 1992	Unreleased
Kings of the Beach	Konami	Ultra Games	January 1990^{NA}	Unreleased	January 1990	Unreleased
Kirby's Adventure	HAL Laboratory	Nintendo	March 23, 1993^{JP}	March 23, 1993	May 1993	September 12, 1993
Kiteretsu Daihyakka	Epoch	Epoch	February 23, 1990^{JP}	February 23, 1990	Unreleased	Unreleased
KlashBall	SOFEL	SOFEL	July 1991^{NA}	Unreleased	July 1991	Unreleased
Klax	Tengen	Hudson Soft	December 14, 1990^{JP}	December 14, 1990	Unreleased	Unreleased
Knight Rider	Pack-In-Video	Pack-In-Video^{JP} Acclaim Entertainment^{NA/PAL}	September 30, 1988^{JP}	September 30, 1988	December 1989	July 27, 1990
Konami Hyper Soccer	Konami	Konami	1992^{PAL}	Unreleased	Unreleased	1992
Konami Wai Wai World	Konami	Konami	January 14, 1988^{JP}	January 14, 1988	Unreleased	Unreleased
Koufuku wo Yobu Game: Dora Dora Dora	Natsume	Natsume	January 25, 1991^{JP}	January 25, 1991	Unreleased	Unreleased
Kōryū Densetsu Villgust Gaiden	Plex	Angel	July 30, 1993^{JP}	July 30, 1993	Unreleased	Unreleased
Kōshien	K Amusement	K Amusement	October 6, 1989^{JP}	October 6, 1989	Unreleased	Unreleased
The Krion Conquest; Magical Kids Doropie^{JP}	Vic Tokai	Vic Tokai	December 14, 1990^{JP}	December 14, 1990	January 1991	Unreleased
Krusty's Fun House	Audiogenic	Acclaim Entertainment	September 1992^{NA}	Unreleased	September 1992	1992
Kujaku Ō	Graphic Research	Pony Canyon	September 21, 1988^{JP}	September 21, 1988	Unreleased	Unreleased
Kujaku Ō II	Atelier Double	Pony Canyon	August 11, 1990^{JP}	August 11, 1990	Unreleased	Unreleased
Kung Fu; Spartan X^{JP}	Nintendo R&D4	Nintendo	June 21, 1985^{JP}	June 21, 1985	October 18, 1985	April 15, 1987
Kung-Fu Heroes; Super Chinese^{JP}	Nihon Game	Namco^{JP} Culture Brain^{NA}	June 20, 1986^{JP}	June 20, 1986	March 1989	Unreleased
Kunio-kun's Nekketsu Soccer League	Technōs Japan	Technōs Japan	April 23, 1993^{JP}	April 23, 1993	Unreleased	Unreleased
Kurogane Hiroshi no Yosō Daisuki! Kachiuma Densetsu	Make Software	Nichibutsu	April 20, 1990^{JP}	April 20, 1990	Unreleased	Unreleased
Kyattō Ninden Teyandē	Tecmo	Tecmo	July 19, 1991^{JP}	July 19, 1991	Unreleased	Unreleased
Kyonshis 2	Taito	Taito	September 25, 1987^{JP}	September 25, 1987	Unreleased	Unreleased
Kyōryū Sentai Zyuranger	Arc System Works	Angel	November 13, 1992^{JP}	November 13, 1992	Unreleased	Unreleased
Kyūkyoku Harikiri Kōshien	Taito	Taito	March 19, 1992^{JP}	March 19, 1992	Unreleased	Unreleased
Kyūkyoku Harikiri Stadium	Taito	Taito	June 28, 1988^{JP}	June 28, 1988	Unreleased	Unreleased
Kyūkyoku Harikiri Stadium '88 Senshuu Shin Data Version	Taito	Taito	December 16, 1988^{JP}	December 16, 1988	Unreleased	Unreleased
Kyūkyoku Harikiri Stadium: Heisei Gannen-ban	Winkysoft	Taito	July 21, 1989^{JP}	July 21, 1989	Unreleased	Unreleased
Kyūkyoku Harikiri Stadium III	Taito	Taito	March 1, 1991^{JP}	March 1, 1991	Unreleased	Unreleased
L'Empereur	Koei	Koei	May 23, 1991^{JP}	May 23, 1991	November 1991	Unreleased
Labyrinth: Maō no Meikyū	Atlus	Tokuma Shoten	January 7, 1987^{JP}	January 7, 1987	Unreleased	Unreleased
Lagrange Point	Konami	Konami	April 26, 1991^{JP}	April 26, 1991	Unreleased	Unreleased
Laser Invasion; Gun Sight^{JP}	Konami	Konami	March 15, 1991^{JP}	March 15, 1991	June 1991	Unreleased
LaSalle Ishii no Child's Quest	Namco	Namco	June 23, 1989^{JP}	June 23, 1989	Unreleased	Unreleased
Last Action Hero	Teeny Weeny Games	Sony Imagesoft	October 1993^{NA}	Unreleased	October 1993	Unreleased
Last Armageddon	Advance Communication Company	Yutaka	November 10, 1990^{JP}	November 10, 1990	Unreleased	Unreleased
The Last Ninja	Beam Software	Jaleco	February 1991^{NA}	Unreleased	February 1991	Unreleased
The Last Starfighter	Eastridge Technology	Mindscape	June 1990^{NA}	Unreleased	June 1990	Unreleased
Law of the West	Tose	Pony Canyon	March 6, 1987^{JP}	March 6, 1987	Unreleased	Unreleased
Layla	dB-SOFT	dB-SOFT	December 20, 1986^{JP}	December 20, 1986	Unreleased	Unreleased
Lee Trevino's Fighting Golf; Fighting Golf^{JP}	SNK	SNK	March 24, 1988^{JP}	March 24, 1988	September 1988	May 18, 1990
Legacy of the Wizard; Dragon Slayer IV: Drasle Family^{JP}	Nihon Falcom	Namco^{JP} Broderbund^{NA}	July 17, 1987^{JP}	July 17, 1987	May 1989	Unreleased
Legendary Wings	Capcom	Capcom	July 1988^{NA}	Unreleased	July 1988	Unreleased
The Legend of Kage	Taito	Taito	April 18, 1986^{JP}	April 18, 1986	August 1987	Unreleased
The Legend of Prince Valiant	Special FX Software	Ocean Software	1992^{PAL}	Unreleased	Unreleased	1992
The Legend of Zelda	Nintendo R&D4	Nintendo	August 22, 1987^{NA}	February 19, 1994	August 22, 1987	November 15, 1987
Legends of the Diamond	Tose	Bandai	January 1992^{NA}	Unreleased	January 1992	Unreleased
Lemmings	Ocean Software	Sunsoft	November 1992^{NA}	Unreleased	November 1992	May 19, 1993
Lethal Weapon	Eurocom	Ocean Software	April 1993^{NA}	Unreleased	April 1993	1993
Life Force; Salamander^{JP} Life Force: Salamander^{PAL}	Konami	Konami	September 25, 1987^{JP}	September 25, 1987	August 1988	November 22, 1989
The Lion King	Dark Technologies	Virgin Interactive Entertainment	May 25, 1995^{PAL}	Unreleased	Unreleased	May 25, 1995
Little League Baseball: Championship Series	SNK	SNK	July 1990^{NA}	Unreleased	July 1990	Unreleased
Little Magic	Data East	Data East	September 14, 1990^{JP}	September 14, 1990	Unreleased	Unreleased
The Little Mermaid	Capcom	Capcom	July 19, 1991^{JP}	July 19, 1991	July 1991	Unreleased
Little Nemo: The Dream Master	Capcom	Capcom^{JP/NA} Nintendo^{PAL}	September 1990^{NA}	December 7, 1990	September 1990	December 12, 1991
Little Ninja Brothers; Super Chinese 2^{JP}	Culture Brain	Culture Brain	May 26, 1989^{JP}	May 26, 1989	February 1991	December 27, 1992
Little Samson; Seirei Densetsu Lickle^{JP}	Takeru	Taito	June 26, 1992^{JP}	June 26, 1992	November 1992	March 13, 1993
Lode Runner	Hudson Soft	Hudson Soft^{JP} Broderbund^{NA}	July 31, 1984^{JP}	July 31, 1984	September 1987	Unreleased
The Lone Ranger	Konami	Konami	August 1991^{NA}	Unreleased	August 1991	Unreleased
Loopz	Bits Studios	Mindscape	October 1990^{NA}	Unreleased	October 1990	Unreleased
Lost Word of Jenny	Tose	Takara	March 25, 1987^{JP}	March 25, 1987	Unreleased	Unreleased
Lot Lot	HAL Laboratory	Tokuma Shoten	December 21, 1985^{JP}	December 21, 1985	Unreleased	Unreleased
Low G Man: The Low Gravity Man	KID	Taxan^{NA} Nintendo^{PAL}	September 1990^{NA}	Unreleased	September 1990	1991
Lunar Pool; Lunar Ball^{JP}	Compile	Pony Canyon^{JP} FCI^{NA/PAL}	December 5, 1985^{JP}	December 5, 1985	October 1987	1991
Lupin Sansei: Pandora no Isan	Tose	Namco	November 6, 1987^{JP}	November 6, 1987	Unreleased	Unreleased
M.C. Kids; McDonaldland^{PAL}	Virgin Games	Virgin Games^{NA} Ocean Software^{PAL}	February 1992^{NA}	Unreleased	February 1992	May 1993
M.U.L.E.	Eastridge Technology	Mindscape	September 1990^{NA}	Unreleased	September 1990	Unreleased
Mach Rider	HAL Laboratory	Nintendo	November 21, 1985^{JP}	November 21, 1985	August 1986	March 15, 1987
Mad Max	Gray Matter; Eastridge Technology	Mindscape	July 1990^{NA}	Unreleased	July 1990	Unreleased
The Mafat Conspiracy; Golgo 13 - Dai 2 Shou - Ikarosu no Nazo^{JP}	Aicom	Vic Tokai	June 1990^{NA}	July 27, 1990	June 1990	Unreleased
The Magic Candle	Japan Soft Technology	Sammy	March 6, 1992^{JP}	March 6, 1992	Unreleased	Unreleased
Magic Darts	SETA	SETA^{JP} Romstar^{NA}	April 26, 1991^{JP}	April 26, 1991	September 1991	Unreleased
Magic Johnson's Fast Break	Software Creations	Tradewest	March 1990^{NA}	Unreleased	March 1990	Unreleased
The Magic of Scheherazade; Arabian Dream Scheherazade^{JP}	Culture Brain	Culture Brain	September 3, 1987^{JP}	September 3, 1987	January 1990	Unreleased
Magical Taruruto-kun: Fantastic World!!	Tose	Bandai	March 21, 1991^{JP}	March 21, 1991	Unreleased	Unreleased
Magical Taruruto-kun 2: Mahō Daibouken	Tose	Bandai	June 19, 1992^{JP}	June 19, 1992	Unreleased	Unreleased
Magician	Eurocom	Taxan	February 1991^{NA}	Unreleased	February 1991	Unreleased
MagMax	Nichibutsu	Nichibutsu^{JP} FCI^{NA}	March 19, 1986^{JP}	March 19, 1986	October 1988	Unreleased
Magnum Kiki Ippatsu: Empire City 1931	Seibu Kaihatsu	Toshiba EMI	December 25, 1987^{JP}	December 25, 1987	Unreleased	Unreleased
Maharaja	Quest	Sunsoft	September 29, 1989^{JP}	September 29, 1989	Unreleased	Unreleased
Mah-Jong (Note: The 72-pin NES cartridge version of this game was only available in Hong Kong titled as Mah Jong. The NES was officially released in Hong Kong around 1987, and it is fairly rare. This game is the rarest licensed and commercially available NES game produced with fewer than 10 copies known.)	Nintendo R&D2	Nintendo	August 27, 1983^{JP}	August 27, 1983	Unreleased	Unreleased
Mahjong Club Nagatacho: Sōsaisen	Hect	Hect	April 25, 1991^{JP}	April 25, 1991	Unreleased	Unreleased
Mahjong Taikai	Koei	Koei	October 31, 1989^{JP}	October 31, 1989	Unreleased	Unreleased
Mahjong Taisen	Nichibutsu	Nichibutsu	May 20, 1992^{JP}	May 20, 1992	Unreleased	Unreleased
Mahō no Princess Minky Momo: Remember Dream	Bits Laboratory	Yutaka	July 29, 1992^{JP}	July 29, 1992	Unreleased	Unreleased
Maison Ikkoku: Omoide no Photograph	Bothtec	Bothtec	July 21, 1988^{JP}	July 21, 1988	Unreleased	Unreleased
Majaventure: Mahjong Senki	Tokuma Shoten	Tokuma Shoten	October 19, 1990^{JP}	October 19, 1990	Unreleased	Unreleased
Majō Densetsu II: Daimashikyō Galious	Konami	Konami	August 11, 1987^{JP}	August 11, 1987	Unreleased	Unreleased
Major League	Lenar	Irem	October 27, 1989^{JP}	October 27, 1989	Unreleased	Unreleased
Major League Baseball	Atlus	LJN	April 1988^{NA}	Unreleased	April 1988	Unreleased
Maniac Mansion (JP)	Jaleco	Jaleco	September 13, 1988^{JP}	September 13, 1988	Unreleased (Note: A different port by the same publisher was released in this region.)	Unreleased
Maniac Mansion	LucasArts; Realtime Associates	Jaleco	September 1990^{NA}	Unreleased	September 1990	October 22, 1992
Mappy	Namco	Namco	November 14, 1984^{JP}	November 14, 1984	Unreleased	Unreleased
Mappy-Land	Tose	Namco^{JP} Taxan^{NA}	November 26, 1986^{JP}	November 26, 1986	April 1989	Unreleased
Mappy Kids	Namco	Namco	December 22, 1989^{JP}	December 22, 1989	Unreleased	Unreleased
Marble Madness	Rare	Milton Bradley	March 1989^{NA}	Unreleased	March 1989	August 29, 1991
Mario Bros.	Nintendo R&D1; Intelligent Systems	Nintendo	September 9, 1983^{JP}	September 9, 1983	June 1986	September 1, 1986
Mario Bros. Classic Series	Nintendo EAD	Nintendo	April 13, 1993^{PAL}	Unreleased	Unreleased	April 13, 1993
Mario Is Missing!	Radical Entertainment	The Software Toolworks^{NA} Mindscape^{PAL}	June 1993^{NA}	Unreleased	June 1993	1993
Mario's Time Machine	Radical Entertainment	The Software Toolworks	June 1994^{NA}	Unreleased	June 1994	Unreleased
Marusa no Onna	Capcom	Capcom	September 19, 1989^{JP}	September 19, 1989	Unreleased	Unreleased
Mashin Eiyuuden Wataru Gaiden	Westone	Hudson Soft	March 23, 1990^{JP}	March 23, 1990	Unreleased	Unreleased
Masuzoe Yōichi: Asa Made Famicom	Coconuts Japan	Coconuts Japan	April 17, 1992^{JP}	April 17, 1992	Unreleased	Unreleased
Matsumoto Toru no Kabushiki Hisshougaku	Imagineer	Imagineer	February 18, 1988^{JP}	February 18, 1988	Unreleased	Unreleased
Matsumoto Toru no Kabushiki Hisshougaku II	Infinity	Imagineer	March 31, 1989^{JP}	March 31, 1989	Unreleased	Unreleased
Mechanized Attack	SNK	SNK	June 1990^{NA}	Unreleased	June 1990	Unreleased
Mega Man	Capcom	Capcom	December 17, 1987^{JP}	December 17, 1987	December 1987	December 13, 1989
Mega Man 2	Capcom	Capcom	December 24, 1988^{JP}	December 24, 1988	June 1989	December 14, 1990
Mega Man 3	Capcom	Capcom^{JP/NA} Nintendo^{PAL}	September 28, 1990^{JP}	September 28, 1990	November 1990	February 20, 1992
Mega Man 4	Capcom	Capcom^{JP/NA} Nintendo^{PAL}	December 6, 1991^{JP}	December 6, 1991	January 1992	January 21, 1993
Mega Man 5	Capcom	Capcom^{JP/NA} Nintendo^{PAL}	December 4, 1992^{JP}	December 4, 1992	December 1992	November 18, 1993
Mega Man 6	Capcom	Capcom^{JP} Nintendo^{NA}	November 5, 1993^{JP}	November 5, 1993	March 1994	Unreleased
Meiji Ishin	Use Corporation	Use Corporation	September 29, 1989^{JP}	September 29, 1989	Unreleased	Unreleased
Meimon! Daisan Yakyū-bu	Human Entertainment	Bandai	August 8, 1989^{JP}	August 8, 1989	Unreleased	Unreleased
Meimon! Tako Nishiōendan	Graphic Research	Asmik	December 1, 1989^{JP}	December 1, 1989	Unreleased	Unreleased
Meitantei Holmes: Kiri no London Satsujin Jiken	Another	Towa Chiki	May 13, 1988^{JP}	May 13, 1988	Unreleased	Unreleased
Meitantei Holmes: M-Kara no Chousenjou	Another	Towa Chiki	May 1, 1989^{JP}	May 1, 1989	Unreleased	Unreleased
Mendel Palace; Quinty^{JP}	Game Freak	Namco^{JP} Hudson Soft^{NA}	June 27, 1989^{JP}	June 27, 1989	October 1990	Unreleased
Metal Gear	Konami	Konami^{JP/PAL} Ultra Games^{NA}	December 22, 1987^{JP}	December 22, 1987	June 1988	December 13, 1989
Metal Max	Crea-Tech; Data East	Data East	May 24, 1991^{JP}	May 24, 1991	Unreleased	Unreleased
Metal Mech: Man & Machine; Metal Flame: Psybuster^{JP}	Sculptured Software	Jaleco	December 14, 1990^{JP}	December 14, 1990	March 1991	Unreleased
Metal Slader Glory	HAL Laboratory	HAL Laboratory	August 30, 1991^{JP}	August 30, 1991	Unreleased	Unreleased
Metal Storm	Tamtex	Irem	February 1991^{NA}	April 24, 1992	February 1991	Unreleased
Metro-Cross	Now Production	Namco	December 16, 1986^{JP}	December 16, 1986	Unreleased	Unreleased
Metroid	Nintendo R&D1; Intelligent Systems	Nintendo	August 1987^{NA}	Unreleased	August 1987	January 15, 1988
Mezase Pachi Pro: Pachio-kun	Marionette	Coconuts Japan	December 18, 1987^{JP}	December 18, 1987	Unreleased	Unreleased
Mezase! Top Pro: Green ni Kakeru Yume	Jaleco	Jaleco	March 5, 1993^{JP}	March 5, 1993	Unreleased	Unreleased
Michael Andretti's World GP; Nakajima Satoru F-1 Hero^{JP}	Human Entertainment	Varie^{JP} American Sammy^{NA}	December 9, 1988^{JP}	December 9, 1988	June 1990	Unreleased
Mickey Mousecapade; Mickey Mouse: Fushigi no Kuni no Daibōken^{JP}	Hudson Soft	Hudson Soft^{JP} Capcom^{NA}	March 6, 1987^{JP}	March 6, 1987	October 1988	Unreleased
Mickey's Adventures in Numberland	Beam Software	Hi Tech Expressions	March 1994^{NA}	Unreleased	March 1994	Unreleased
Mickey's Safari in Letterland	Beam Software	Hi Tech Expressions	March 1993^{NA}	Unreleased	March 1993	Unreleased
Might and Magic: The Secret of the Inner Sanctum	G-Amusements	Gakken^{JP} American Sammy^{NA}	July 31, 1990^{JP}	July 31, 1990	August 1992	Unreleased
Mighty Bomb Jack	Tecmo	Tecmo	April 24, 1986^{JP}	April 24, 1986	July 1987	1992
Mighty Final Fight	Capcom	Capcom	June 11, 1993^{JP}	June 11, 1993	July 1993	December 2, 1993
Mike Tyson's Punch-Out!! (Note: Copies released after August 1990 were simply rebranded as Punch Out!!, with Mike Tyson replaced by a new opponent.)	Nintendo R&D3	Nintendo	October 1987^{NA}	November 21, 1987	October 1987	December 15, 1987
Millipede	HAL Laboratory	HAL Laboratory	October 1, 1987^{JP}	October 1, 1987	October 1988	Unreleased
Milon's Secret Castle	Hudson Soft	Hudson Soft	November 13, 1986^{JP}	November 13, 1986	September 1988	Unreleased
Mindseeker	Namco	Namco	April 18, 1989^{JP}	April 18, 1989	Unreleased	Unreleased
Minelvaton Saga: Ragon no Fukkatsu	Random House	Taito	October 23, 1987^{JP}	October 23, 1987	Unreleased	Unreleased
Mini-Putt	A-Wave	A-Wave	February 15, 1991^{JP}	February 15, 1991	Unreleased	Unreleased
Minna no Tabou no Nakayoshi Daisakusen	Bits Laboratory	Character Soft	November 22, 1991^{JP}	November 22, 1991	Unreleased	Unreleased
The Miracle Piano Teaching System	The Software Toolworks	The Software Toolworks^{NA} Mindscape^{PAL}	1990^{NA}	Unreleased	1990	1990
Miracle Ropitt: 2100-Nen no Daibōken	Micronics	King Records	August 7, 1987^{JP}	August 7, 1987	Unreleased	Unreleased
Mirai Senshi: Lios	Pack-In-Video	Pack-In-Video	December 1, 1989^{JP}	December 1, 1989	Unreleased	Unreleased
Mirai Shinwa Jarvas	Taito	Taito	June 30, 1987^{JP}	June 30, 1987	Unreleased	Unreleased
Mission: Impossible	Konami	Ultra Games^{NA} Palcom Software^{PAL}	September 1990^{NA}	Unreleased	September 1990	November 28, 1991
Mississippi Satsujin Jiken	Tose	Jaleco	October 31, 1986^{JP}	October 31, 1986	Unreleased	Unreleased
Mito Kōmon II: Sekai Manyūki	Tose	Sunsoft	August 11, 1988^{JP}	August 11, 1988	Unreleased	Unreleased
Mitsume ga Tōru	Natsume	Tomy	July 17, 1992^{JP}	July 17, 1992	Unreleased	Unreleased
Mizushima Shinji no Daikōshien	Capcom	Capcom	October 26, 1990^{JP}	October 26, 1990	Unreleased	Unreleased
Moai-kun	Konami	Konami	March 9, 1990^{JP}	March 9, 1990	Unreleased	Unreleased
Moero!! Jūdō Warriors	Jaleco	Jaleco	June 29, 1990^{JP}	June 29, 1990	Unreleased	Unreleased
Momotarō Densetsu	Hudson Soft	Hudson Soft	October 26, 1987^{JP}	October 26, 1987	Unreleased	Unreleased
Momotarō Densetsu Gaiden	Hudson Soft	Hudson Soft	December 17, 1993^{JP}	December 17, 1993	Unreleased	Unreleased
Momotarō Dentetsu	Hudson Soft	Hudson Soft	December 2, 1988^{JP}	December 2, 1988	Unreleased	Unreleased
The Money Game	SOFEL	SOFEL	August 10, 1988^{JP}	August 10, 1988	Unreleased	Unreleased
Monopoly	Sculptured Software	Parker Brothers^{NA/PAL} Tomy^{JP}	May 1991^{NA}	November 1, 1991	May 1991	1991
Monster in My Pocket	Konami	Konami^{NA} Palcom Software^{PAL}	January 1992^{NA}	Unreleased	January 1992	1992
Monster Maker: 7-tsu no Hihou	SOFEL	SOFEL	December 20, 1991^{JP}	December 20, 1991	Unreleased	Unreleased
Monster Party	Human Entertainment	Bandai	June 1989^{NA}	Unreleased	June 1989	Unreleased
Monster Truck Rally	Realtime Associates	INTV	September 1991^{NA}	Unreleased	September 1991	Unreleased
Moon Crystal	Hect	Hect	August 28, 1992^{JP}	August 28, 1992	Unreleased	Unreleased
Morita Shōgi	Random House	SETA	April 14, 1987^{JP}	April 14, 1987	Unreleased	Unreleased
Mother	Ape Inc. Nintendo Tokyo R&D Products; Pax Softnica	Nintendo	July 27, 1989^{JP}	July 27, 1989	Unreleased	Unreleased
Motocross Champion	Human Entertainment	Konami	January 27, 1989^{JP}	January 27, 1989	Unreleased	Unreleased
Motor City Patrol	Source Research & Development	Matchbox	January 1992^{NA}	Unreleased	January 1992	Unreleased
Mottomo Abunai Deka	Micronics	Toei Animation	February 6, 1990^{JP}	February 6, 1990	Unreleased	Unreleased
Moulin Rouge Senki: Melville no Honoo	Interlink	Gakken	August 11, 1989^{JP}	August 11, 1989	Unreleased	Unreleased
Mōryō Senki Madara	Konami	Konami	March 30, 1990^{JP}	March 30, 1990	Unreleased	Unreleased
Mr. Gimmick; Gimmick!^{JP}	Sunsoft	Sunsoft	January 31, 1992^{JP}	January 31, 1992	Unreleased	May 19, 1993^{SCN}
Ms. Pac-Man	Now Production	Namco	November 1993^{NA}	Unreleased	November 1993	Unreleased
Muppet Adventure: Chaos at the Carnival	Mind's Eye	Hi Tech Expressions	November 1990^{NA}	Unreleased	November 1990	Unreleased
Murder Club	Riverhillsoft	SETA	June 30, 1989^{JP}	June 30, 1989	Unreleased	Unreleased
Musashi no Bōken	Quest	Sigma Enterprises	December 22, 1990^{JP}	December 22, 1990	Unreleased	Unreleased
Musashi no Ken – Tadaima Shugyō Chū	Taito	Taito	August 8, 1986^{JP}	August 8, 1986	Unreleased	Unreleased
The Mutant Virus: Crisis in a Computer World	Rocket Science Productions	American Softworks	April 1992^{NA}	Unreleased	April 1992	Unreleased
My Life My Love: Boku no Yume Watashi no Negai	Winkysoft	Banpresto	August 3, 1991^{JP}	August 3, 1991	Unreleased	Unreleased
Mystery Quest	Carry Lab	Taxan	April 1989^{NA}	Unreleased	April 1989	Unreleased
Nakajima Satoru F-1 Hero 2	Human Entertainment	Varie	September 27, 1991^{JP}	September 27, 1991	Unreleased	Unreleased
Nakayoshi to Issho	Technosite	Yutaka	December 10, 1993^{JP}	December 10, 1993	Unreleased	Unreleased
Namco Classic	Tose	Namco	May 27, 1988^{JP}	May 27, 1988	Unreleased	Unreleased
Namco Classic II	Tose	Namco	March 13, 1992^{JP}	March 13, 1992	Unreleased	Unreleased
Namcot Mahjong III: Mahjong Tengoku	Namco	Namco	March 8, 1991^{JP}	March 8, 1991	Unreleased	Unreleased
Nankoku Shirei!! Spy vs. Spy	Kemco	Kemco	March 27, 1987^{JP}	March 27, 1987	Unreleased	Unreleased
Nantettatte!! Baseball (Note: This game uses a special cartridge which lets you attach a smaller cartridge which when inserted update team rosters, allowing for more teams to play as.)	Sunsoft	Sunsoft	October 26, 1990^{JP}	October 26, 1990	Unreleased	Unreleased
Nantettatte!! Baseball Ko-Game Cassette - '91 Kaimaku Hen (Note: This is an expansion pack for Nantettatte!! Baseball. This comes in a small cartridge that you are supposed to attach to Nantettatte!! Baseball and doing that updates the team rosters with new stats for the upcoming season, in an effort to keep the gameplay fresh.)	Sunsoft	Sunsoft	May 31, 1991^{JP}	May 31, 1991	Unreleased	Unreleased
Nantettatte!! Baseball Ko-Game Cassette - OB All Star Hen	Sunsoft	Sunsoft	February 28, 1991^{JP}	February 28, 1991	Unreleased	Unreleased
Napoleon Senki	Lenar	Irem	March 18, 1988^{JP}	March 18, 1988	Unreleased	Unreleased
Narc	Rare	Acclaim Entertainment	August 1990^{NA}	Unreleased	August 1990	Unreleased
Navy Blue	Use Corporation	I'MAX	February 14, 1992^{JP}	February 14, 1992	Unreleased	Unreleased
Nekketsu Kakutō Densetsu	Technōs Japan	Technōs Japan	December 23, 1992^{JP}	December 23, 1992	Unreleased	Unreleased
Nekketsu Street Basket: Ganbare Dunk Heroes	Technōs Japan	Technōs Japan	December 22, 1993^{JP}	December 22, 1993	Unreleased	Unreleased
NES Open Tournament Golf; Mario Open Golf^{JP}	Nintendo R&D2; HAL Laboratory	Nintendo	September 20, 1991^{JP}	September 20, 1991	September 1991	June 18, 1992
NES Play Action Football	Tose	Nintendo	September 1990^{NA}	Unreleased	September 1990	Unreleased
New Ghostbusters II	HAL Laboratory	HAL Laboratory	December 26, 1990^{JP}	December 26, 1990	Unreleased	1991
The NewZealand Story; Kiwi Kraze^{NA}	Software Creations	Ocean Software^{PAL} Taito^{NA}	April 1991^{NA}	Unreleased	April 1991	December 27, 1991
NFL	Atlus	LJN	September 1989^{NA}	Unreleased	September 1989	Unreleased
Nichibutsu Mahjong III Mahjong G-Men	Nichibutsu	Nichibutsu	July 20, 1990^{JP}	July 20, 1990	Unreleased	Unreleased
Nigel Mansell's World Championship Racing	Gremlin Graphics	GameTek^{NA} Gremlin Interactive^{PAL}	October 1993^{NA}	Unreleased	October 1993	1993
A Nightmare on Elm Street	Rare	LJN	October 1990^{NA}	Unreleased	October 1990	Unreleased
Nightshade	Beam Software	Ultra Games	January 1992^{NA}	Unreleased	January 1992	Unreleased
Niji no Silkroad	Advance Communication Company	Victor Musical Industries	February 22, 1991^{JP}	February 22, 1991	Unreleased	Unreleased
Ninja Crusaders	NMK	Sammy	December 14, 1990^{JP}	December 14, 1990	December 1990	Unreleased
Ninja Gaiden; Ninja Ryūkenden^{JP} Shadow Warriors^{PAL}	Tecmo	Tecmo	December 9, 1988^{JP}	December 9, 1988	March 1989	August 15, 1991
Ninja Gaiden II: The Dark Sword of Chaos; Ninja Ryūkenden II: Ankoku no Jashin Ken^{JP} Shadow Warriors II: The Dark Sword of Chaos^{PAL}	Tecmo	Tecmo	April 6, 1990^{JP}	April 6, 1990	May 1990	October 27, 1994
Ninja Gaiden III: The Ancient Ship of Doom; Ninja Ryūkenden III: Yomi no Hakobune^{JP}	Tecmo	Tecmo	June 21, 1991^{JP}	June 21, 1991	August 1991	Unreleased
Ninja Hattori-kun	Hudson Soft	Hudson Soft	March 5, 1986^{JP}	March 5, 1986	Unreleased	Unreleased
Ninja JaJaMaru-kun	Jaleco	Jaleco	November 15, 1985^{JP}	November 15, 1985	Unreleased	Unreleased
Ninja JaJaMaru: Ginga Daisakusen	Jaleco	Jaleco	March 29, 1991^{JP}	March 29, 1991	Unreleased	Unreleased
Ninja Kid; GeGeGe no Kitaro - Yōkai Daimakyō^{JP}	Tose	Bandai	April 17, 1986^{JP}	April 17, 1986	October 1986	Unreleased
Ninja-kun: Ashura no Shō	Micronics	UPL	May 27, 1988^{JP}	May 27, 1988	Unreleased	Unreleased
Ninja-kun: Majō no Bōken	Tose	Jaleco	May 10, 1985^{JP}	May 10, 1985	Unreleased	Unreleased
Ninjara Hoi!	ASCII	ASCII	August 8, 1990^{JP}	August 8, 1990	Unreleased	Unreleased
Nintendo World Cup; Nekketsu Kōkō Dojjibōru Bu: Sakkā Hen^{JP}	Technōs Japan	Technōs Japan^{JP} Nintendo^{NA/PAL}	May 18, 1990^{JP}	May 18, 1990	December 1990	June 27, 1991
Nippon Ichi no Meikantoku	Asmik	Asmik	August 10, 1990^{JP}	August 10, 1990	Unreleased	Unreleased
Nishimura Kyōtarō Mystery: Blue Train Satsujin Jiken	Tose	Irem	January 20, 1989^{JP}	January 20, 1989	Unreleased	Unreleased
Nishimura Kyōtarō Mystery: Super Express Satsujin Jiken	Tose	Irem	March 2, 1990^{JP}	March 2, 1990	Unreleased	Unreleased
Noah's Ark	Source Research & Development	Konami	1992^{PAL}	Unreleased	Unreleased	November 22, 1992
Nobunaga's Ambition; Nobunaga no Yabō: Zenkokuban^{JP}	Koei	Koei	March 18, 1988^{JP}	March 18, 1988	June 1989	Unreleased
Nobunaga's Ambition II; Nobunaga no Yabō: Sengoku Gun'yūden^{JP}	Koei	Koei	February 3, 1990^{JP}	February 3, 1990	April 1991	Unreleased
Nobunaga no Yabō: Bushō Fūunroku	Koei	Koei	December 21, 1991^{JP}	December 21, 1991	Unreleased	Unreleased
North & South	Kemco	Kemco^{JP} Seika^{NA} Infogrames^{PAL}	September 21, 1990^{JP}	September 21, 1990	December 1990	January 23, 1992
Nuts & Milk	Hudson Soft	Hudson Soft	July 28, 1984^{JP}	July 28, 1984	Unreleased	Unreleased
Obocchama-kun	Tecmo	Tecmo	April 5, 1991^{JP}	April 5, 1991	Unreleased	Unreleased
Okkotoshi Puzzle Tonjan!?	NMK	Jaleco	September 29, 1989^{JP}	September 29, 1989	Unreleased	Unreleased
Oeka Kids: Anpanman no Hiragana Daisuki	Tose	Bandai	March 26, 1991^{JP}	March 26, 1991	Unreleased	Unreleased
Oeka Kids: Anpanman to Oekaki Shiyō!!	Tose	Bandai	October 25, 1990^{JP}	October 25, 1990	Unreleased	Unreleased
Oishinbo: Kyukyoku no Menu 3bon Syoubu	Tose	Shinsei	July 25, 1989^{JP}	July 25, 1989	Unreleased	Unreleased
Onyanko Town	Micronics	Pony Canyon	November 21, 1985^{JP}	November 21, 1985	Unreleased	Unreleased
Operation Wolf	Daiei Seisakusho	Taito	March 31, 1989^{JP}	March 31, 1989	May 1989	1992
Orb-3D	The Software Toolworks	Hi Tech Expressions	October 1990^{NA}	Unreleased	October 1990	Unreleased
Osomatsu-kun: Back to the Me no Deppa no Maki	Tose	Shinsei	December 8, 1989^{JP}	December 8, 1989	Unreleased	Unreleased
Otaku no Seiza: An Adventure in the Otaku Galaxy	Advance Communication Company	M&M	July 31, 1991^{JP}	July 31, 1991	Unreleased	Unreleased
Othello	HAL Laboratory	Kawada^{JP} Acclaim Entertainment^{NA}	November 13, 1986^{JP}	November 13, 1986	December 1988	Unreleased
Outlanders	Micronics	Victor Musical Industries	December 4, 1987^{JP}	December 4, 1987	Unreleased	Unreleased
Over Horizon	Pixel; Hot-B	Hot-B^{JP} Takara^{PAL}	April 26, 1991^{JP}	April 26, 1991	Unreleased	1992
Overlord	Probe Software	Virgin Games	January 1993^{NA}	Unreleased	January 1993	Unreleased
P.O.W.: Prisoners of War; Datsugoku: Prisoners of War^{JP}	SNK	K Amusement^{JP} SNK^{NA/PAL}	June 30, 1989^{JP}	June 30, 1989	September 1989	1989
Pac-Land	Namco	Namco	November 21, 1985^{JP}	November 21, 1985	Unreleased	Unreleased
Pac-Man	Namco	Namco (Note: In North America, this game was released initially by Tengen in 1988 as a licensed title and again in 1989 unlicensed. In November 1993, Namco rereleased the game in North America as a licensed title. The game was released solely by Namco in Japan and Europe.); Tengen^{NA}	November 2, 1984^{JP}	November 2, 1984	October 1988	1993
Pachicom	Bear's	Toshiba EMI	November 21, 1985^{JP}	November 21, 1985	Unreleased	Unreleased
Pachi-Slot Adventure 2	Coconuts Japan	Coconuts Japan	September 17, 1993^{JP}	September 17, 1993	Unreleased	Unreleased
Pachi-Slot Adventure 3: Bitaoshii 7 Kenzan!	Aisystem Tokyo	Coconuts Japan	May 13, 1994^{JP}	May 13, 1994	Unreleased	Unreleased
Pachinko Daisakusen	C-Dream	Coconuts Japan	July 19, 1991^{JP}	July 19, 1991	Unreleased	Unreleased
Pachinko Daisakusen 2	C-Dream	Coconuts Japan	July 10, 1992^{JP}	July 10, 1992	Unreleased	Unreleased
Pachio-kun 2	C-Dream	Coconuts Japan	January 30, 1989^{JP}	January 30, 1989	Unreleased	Unreleased
Pachio-kun 3	C-Dream	Coconuts Japan	October 26, 1990^{JP}	October 26, 1990	Unreleased	Unreleased
Pachio-kun 4	C-Dream	Coconuts Japan	November 22, 1991^{JP}	November 22, 1991	Unreleased	Unreleased
Pachio-kun 5	C-Dream	Coconuts Japan	June 18, 1993^{JP}	June 18, 1993	Unreleased	Unreleased
Palamedes	Natsume	Hot-B	July 6, 1990^{JP}	July 6, 1990	November 1990	Unreleased
Palamedes II: Star Twinkles	Hot-B	Hot-B	May 17, 1991^{JP}	May 17, 1991	Unreleased	Unreleased
Panic Restaurant; Wanpaku Kokkun no Gourmet World^{JP}	EIM	Taito	April 24, 1992^{JP}	April 24, 1992	October 1992	May 26, 1994
Paperboy	Eastridge Technology	Mindscape^{NA/PAL} Altron^{JP}	December 1988^{NA}	January 30, 1991	December 1988	October 26, 1990
Paperboy 2	Eastridge Technology	Mindscape	April 1992^{NA}	Unreleased	April 1992	June 6, 1992
Parallel World	EIM	Varie	August 10, 1990^{JP}	August 10, 1990	Unreleased	Unreleased
Parasol Henbē	Sakata SAS	Epoch	February 15, 1991^{JP}	February 15, 1991	Unreleased	Unreleased
Parasol Stars: Rainbow Island II	Ocean Software	Ocean Software	1992^{PAL}	Unreleased	Unreleased	1992
Paris-Dakar Rally Special	ISCO	CBS Sony Group	February 3, 1988^{JP}	February 3, 1988	Unreleased	Unreleased
Parodius	Konami	Konami^{JP} Palcom Software^{PAL}	November 30, 1990^{JP}	November 30, 1990	Unreleased	August 15, 1992
Peepar Time	Sanritsu Denki	Sanritsu Denki	August 10, 1990^{JP}	August 10, 1990	Unreleased	Unreleased
Penguin-kun Wars	Home Data; Pax Softnica	ASCII	December 25, 1985^{JP}	December 25, 1985	Unreleased	Unreleased
Perfect Bowling	Aisystem Tokyo	Tonkin House	July 25, 1989^{JP}	July 25, 1989	Unreleased	Unreleased
Perman: Enban o Torikaese!!	Tamtex	Irem	December 14, 1990^{JP}	December 14, 1990	Unreleased	Unreleased
Perman Part 2: Himitsu Kessha Madoodan o Taose!	Japan System House	Irem	December 20, 1991^{JP}	December 20, 1991	Unreleased	Unreleased
Peter Pan and the Pirates	Equilibrium	THQ	January 1991^{NA}	Unreleased	January 1991	Unreleased
Phantom Fighter; Reigen Dōshi^{JP}	Marionette; SRS	Pony Canyon^{JP} FCI^{NA}	September 16, 1988^{JP}	September 16, 1988	April 1990	Unreleased
Pictionary	Software Creations	LJN	July 1990^{NA}	Unreleased	July 1990	Unreleased
Pinball	Nintendo R&D1; HAL Laboratory	Nintendo	February 2, 1984^{JP}	February 2, 1984	October 18, 1985	September 1, 1986
Pinball Quest	Tose	Jaleco	December 15, 1989^{JP}	December 15, 1989	June 1990	1990
Pin Bot	Rare	Nintendo	April 1990^{NA}	Unreleased	April 1990	1990
Pipe Dream	Distinctive Software	Bullet-Proof Software	September 1990^{NA}	Unreleased	September 1990	Unreleased
Pirates!	Rare	Ultra Games^{NA} Palcom Software^{PAL}	October 1991^{NA}	Unreleased	October 1991	1991
Pizza Pop!	Arc System Works	Jaleco	January 7, 1992^{JP}	January 7, 1992	Unreleased	Unreleased
Plasma Ball	Jaleco	Jaleco	March 27, 1992^{JP}	March 27, 1992	Unreleased	Unreleased
Platoon	Sunsoft	Sunsoft	December 1988^{NA}	Unreleased	December 1988	Unreleased
Pocket Zaurus: Ju Ōken no Nazo	Tose	Bandai	February 27, 1987^{JP}	February 27, 1987	Unreleased	Unreleased
Pooyan	Konami	Hudson Soft	September 20, 1985^{JP}	September 20, 1985	Unreleased	Unreleased
Popeye	Nintendo	Nintendo	July 15, 1983^{JP}	July 15, 1983	June 1986	September 1, 1986
Popeye no Eigo Asobi	Nintendo	Nintendo	November 22, 1983^{JP}	November 22, 1983	Unreleased	Unreleased
The Portopia Serial Murder Case	Chunsoft	Enix	November 29, 1985^{JP}	November 29, 1985	Unreleased	Unreleased
Power Blade; Power Blazer^{JP}	Taito; Natsume	Taito	April 20, 1990^{JP}	April 20, 1990	March 1991	January 23, 1992
Power Blade 2 Captain Saver^{JP}	Taito; Natsume	Taito	September 29, 1992^{JP}	September 29, 1992	October 1992	Unreleased
Power Punch II	Beam Software	American Softworks	June 1992^{NA}	Unreleased	June 1992	Unreleased
Power Soccer	Kitty Group	Tokuma Shoten	March 30, 1990^{JP}	March 30, 1990	Unreleased	Unreleased
Predator	Pack-In-Video	Pack-In-Video^{JP} Activision^{NA/PAL}	March 10, 1988^{JP}	March 10, 1988	April 1989	1992
President no Sentaku	Another	Hot-B	March 2, 1990^{JP}	March 2, 1990	Unreleased	Unreleased
Prince of Persia	MotiveTime	Virgin Games^{NA} Mindscape^{PAL}	November 1992^{NA}	Unreleased	November 1992	April 29, 1993
Princess Tomato in the Salad Kingdom	Hudson Soft	Hudson Soft	May 27, 1988^{JP}	May 27, 1988	February 1991	Unreleased
Pro Sport Hockey; USA Ice Hockey in FC^{JP}	Tose	Jaleco	March 6, 1993^{JP}	March 6, 1993	November 1993	Unreleased
Pro Wrestling	Nintendo R&D3	Nintendo	March 1987^{NA}	Unreleased	March 1987	September 15, 1987
Pro Yakyū: Family Stadium '87	Namco	Namco	December 22, 1987^{JP}	December 22, 1987	Unreleased	Unreleased
Pro Yakyū: Family Stadium '88 Nendoban	Namco	Namco	December 20, 1988^{JP}	December 20, 1988	Unreleased	Unreleased
Pro Yakyū? Satsujin Jiken!	Capcom	Capcom	December 24, 1988^{JP}	December 24, 1988	Unreleased	Unreleased
The Punisher	Beam Software	LJN	January 1991^{NA}	Unreleased	January 1991	Unreleased
Puss 'n Boots: Pero's Great Adventure; Nagagutsu o Haita Neko: Sekai Isshū 80 Nichi Dai Bōken^{JP}	Shouei System	Toei Animation^{JP} Electro Brain^{NA}	November 21, 1986^{JP}	November 21, 1986	June 1990	Unreleased
Puyo Puyo	Compile	Tokuma Shoten	July 23, 1993^{JP}	July 23, 1993	Unreleased	Unreleased
Puzslot	Sammy	Sammy	February 28, 1992^{JP}	February 28, 1992	Unreleased	Unreleased
Puzznic	Taito	Taito^{NA/PAL} IGS^{JP}	November 1990^{NA}	July 19, 1991	November 1990	April 25, 1991
Pyokotan no Dai Meiro	Japan System Supply	Sunsoft	March 19, 1993^{JP}	March 19, 1993	Unreleased	Unreleased
Q*bert	Konami	Ultra Games	February 1989^{NA}	Unreleased	February 1989	Unreleased
Qix	Novotrade International	Taito	January 1991^{NA}	Unreleased	January 1991	Unreleased
Quarter Back Scramble: American Football Game	Natsume	Pony Canyon	December 19, 1989^{JP}	December 19, 1989	Unreleased	Unreleased
Quarth	Konami	Konami	April 13, 1990^{JP}	April 13, 1990	Unreleased	Unreleased
Quiz Project Q: Cutie Project & Battle 10000	Hect	Hect	May 29, 1992^{JP}	May 29, 1992	Unreleased	Unreleased
R.B.I. Baseball; Pro Yakyū: Family Stadium^{JP}	Namco	Namco^{JP} Tengen^{NA}	December 10, 1986^{JP}	December 10, 1986	June 1988	Unreleased
R.C. Pro-Am	Rare	Nintendo	February 1988^{NA}	Unreleased	February 1988	April 15, 1988
R.C. Pro-Am II	Rare	Tradewest	December 1992^{NA}	Unreleased	December 1992	September 23, 1993
Racer Mini Yonku: Japan Cup	Konami	Konami	August 25, 1989^{JP}	August 25, 1989	Unreleased	Unreleased
Racket Attack; Moero!! Pro Tennis^{JP}	Tose	Jaleco	April 15, 1988^{JP}	April 15, 1988	October 1988	March 24, 1994
Rackets & Rivals	Konami	Palcom Software	1993^{PAL}	Unreleased	Unreleased	1993
Rad Racer; Highway Star^{JP}	Square	Square^{JP} Nintendo^{NA/PAL}	August 7, 1987^{JP}	August 7, 1987	October 1987	January 15, 1988
Rad Racer II	Square	Square	June 1990^{NA}	Unreleased	June 1990	Unreleased
Radia Senki: Reimeihen	Tecmo	Tecmo	November 15, 1991^{JP}	November 15, 1991	Unreleased	Unreleased
Raid on Bungeling Bay	Hudson Soft	Hudson Soft^{JP} Broderbund^{NA}	February 22, 1985^{JP}	February 22, 1985	September 1987	Unreleased
Rainbow Islands; Rainbow Island: The Story of Bubble Bobble 2^{JP}	Disco	Taito	July 26, 1988^{JP}	July 26, 1988	June 1991	Unreleased
Rainbow Islands: Bubble Bobble 2	Ocean Software	Ocean Software	1991^{PAL}	Unreleased	Unreleased	1991
Rally Bike; Dash Yarou^{JP}	Visco	Visco^{JP} Romstar^{NA}	June 15, 1990^{JP}	June 15, 1990	September 1990	Unreleased
Rambo	Pack-In-Video	Pack-In-Video^{JP} Acclaim Entertainment^{NA}	December 4, 1987^{JP}	December 4, 1987	May 1988	Unreleased
Rampage	Data East	Data East	December 1988^{NA}	Unreleased	December 1988	Unreleased
Rampart (JP)	Konami	Konami	November 29, 1991^{JP}	November 29, 1991	Unreleased (Note: A different port by another developer and publisher was released in this region.)	Unreleased
Rampart	Bitmasters	Jaleco	January 1992^{NA}	Unreleased	January 1992	1992
Remote Control	Riedel Software Productions	Hi Tech Expressions	May 1990^{NA}	Unreleased	May 1990	Unreleased
The Ren & Stimpy Show: Buckeroo$!	Imagineering	THQ	November 1993^{NA}	Unreleased	November 1993	Unreleased
Renegade; Nekketsu Kōha Kunio-kun^{JP}	Technōs Japan	Technōs Japan^{JP} Taito^{NA}	April 17, 1987^{JP}	April 17, 1987	January 1988	Unreleased
Rescue: The Embassy Mission; Hostages^{JP}	Kemco	Kemco^{JP/PAL} Seika^{NA}	December 1, 1989^{JP}	December 1, 1989	January 1990	March 27, 1991
Ring King; Family Boxing^{JP}	Jastec; Neue Design	Namco^{JP} Data East^{NA}	June 19, 1987^{JP}	June 19, 1987	September 1987	Unreleased
Ripple Island	Sunsoft	Sunsoft	January 23, 1988^{JP}	January 23, 1988	Unreleased	Unreleased
River City Ransom; Downtown Nekketsu Monogatari^{JP} Street Gangs^{PAL}	Technōs Japan	Technōs Japan^{JP/NA} Infogrames^{PAL}	April 25, 1989^{JP}	April 25, 1989	January 1990	1991
RoadBlasters	Beam Software	Mindscape	January 1990^{NA}	Unreleased	January 1990	1990
Road Fighter	Konami	Konami^{JP} Palcom Software^{PAL}	July 11, 1985^{JP}	July 11, 1985	Unreleased	June 18, 1992
Robin Hood: Prince of Thieves	Sculptured Software	Virgin Games^{NA} Mindscape^{PAL}	November 1991^{NA}	Unreleased	November 1991	December 10, 1992
Robocco Wars	Pixel	IGS	August 2, 1991^{JP}	August 2, 1991	Unreleased	Unreleased
RoboCop	Data East; Sakata SAS	Data East^{JP/NA} Ocean Software^{PAL}	August 25, 1989^{JP}	August 25, 1989	December 1989	April 25, 1991
RoboCop 2	Painting by Numbers	Data East^{JP/NA} Ocean Software^{PAL}	April 2, 1991^{JP}	April 2, 1991	April 1991	1991
RoboCop 3	Probe Software	Ocean Software	August 1992^{JP}	Unreleased	August 1992	July 28, 1994
RoboWarrior; Bomber King^{JP}	Hudson Soft; Aicom	Hudson Soft^{JP} Jaleco^{NA/PAL}	August 7, 1987^{JP}	August 7, 1987	December 1988	September 27, 1989
Rock 'n Ball; Family Pinball^{JP}	KID	Namco^{JP} NTVIC^{NA}	March 24, 1989^{JP}	March 24, 1989	January 1990	Unreleased
The Rocketeer	Realtime Associates; Ironwind Software	Bandai	May 1991^{NA}	Unreleased	May 1991	Unreleased
Rocket Ranger	Beam Software	Seika	June 1990^{NA}	Unreleased	June 1990	Unreleased
Rockin' Kats; N.Y. Nyankies^{JP}	Atlus	Atlus	April 5, 1991^{JP}	April 5, 1991	September 1991	November 19, 1992
Rod Land	The Sales Curve	Jaleco^{JP} Storm Sales Curve^{PAL}	December 11, 1992^{JP}	December 11, 1992	Unreleased	1993
Roger Clemens' MVP Baseball	Sculptured Software	LJN	October 1991^{NA}	Unreleased	October 1991	Unreleased
Rokudenashi Blues	Tose	Bandai	October 29, 1993^{JP}	October 29, 1993	Unreleased	Unreleased
Rollerball	HAL Laboratory	HAL Laboratory	December 20, 1988^{JP}	December 20, 1988	February 1990	1992
Rollerblade Racer	Radiance Software	Hi Tech Expressions	February 1993^{NA}	Unreleased	February 1993	Unreleased
RollerGames	Konami	Ultra Games^{NA} Konami^{PAL}	September 1990^{NA}	Unreleased	September 1990	October 24, 1991
Rolling Thunder	Arc System Works	Namco	March 17, 1989^{JP}	March 17, 1989	Unreleased	Unreleased
Romance of the Three Kingdoms; Sangokushi^{JP}	Koei	Koei	October 30, 1988^{JP}	October 30, 1988	October 1989	Unreleased
Romance of the Three Kingdoms II; Sangokushi II^{JP}	Koei	Koei	November 2, 1990^{JP}	November 2, 1990	September 1991	Unreleased
Romancia	Compile	Tokyo Shoseki	October 30, 1987^{JP}	October 30, 1987	Unreleased	Unreleased
Roundball: 2 on 2 Challenge	Park Place Productions	Mindscape	May 1992^{NA}	Unreleased	May 1992	1992
Route-16 Turbo	Sunsoft	Sunsoft	October 4, 1985^{JP}	October 4, 1985	Unreleased	Unreleased
RPG Jinsei Game	Takara	Takara	November 26, 1993^{JP}	November 26, 1993	Unreleased	Unreleased
Rush'n Attack	Konami	Konami	April 1987^{NA}	Unreleased	April 1987	June 28, 1989
Rygar; Argos no Senshi: Hachamecha Daishingeki^{JP}	Tecmo	Tecmo	April 17, 1987^{JP}	April 17, 1987	July 1987	March 30, 1990
S.C.A.T.: Special Cybernetic Attack Team; Final Mission^{JP} Action in New York^{PAL}	Natsume	Natsume^{JP/NA} Infogrames^{PAL}	June 22, 1990^{JP}	June 22, 1990	June 1991	1992
Saint Seiya: Ōgon Densetsu; Les Chevaliers du Zodiaque: La Legende d'Or^{FR}	Tose	Bandai	August 10, 1987^{JP}	August 10, 1987	Unreleased	January 19, 1992^{FR}
Saint Seiya: Ōgon Densetsu Kanketsu Hen	Tose	Bandai	May 30, 1988^{JP}	May 30, 1988	Unreleased	Unreleased
Saiyūki World	NMK	Jaleco	November 11, 1988^{JP}	November 11, 1988	Unreleased	Unreleased
Sakigake!! Otokojuku	Tose	Bandai	March 3, 1989^{JP}	March 3, 1989	Unreleased	Unreleased
Sangokushi: Chūgen no Hasha	Tose	Namco	July 29, 1988^{JP}	July 29, 1988	Unreleased	Unreleased
Sangokushi II: Haō no Tairiku	Tose	Namco	June 10, 1992^{JP}	June 10, 1992	Unreleased	Unreleased
Sanada Jūyūshi	Kemco	Kemco	June 27, 1988^{JP}	June 27, 1988	Unreleased	Unreleased
Sanma no Meitantei	Namco	Namco	April 2, 1987^{JP}	April 2, 1987	Unreleased	Unreleased
Sanrio Carnival	Scitron & Art	Character Soft	November 22, 1990^{JP}	November 22, 1990	Unreleased	Unreleased
Sanrio Carnival 2	Character Soft	Character Soft	January 14, 1993^{JP}	January 14, 1993	Unreleased	Unreleased
Sanrio Cup: Pon Pon Volley	Character Soft	Character Soft	July 17, 1992^{JP}	July 17, 1992	Unreleased	Unreleased
Sansara Naga	Advance Communication Company	Victor Musical Industries	March 23, 1990^{JP}	March 23, 1990	Unreleased	Unreleased
Sansū 1-nen: Keisan Game	Tokyo Shoseki	Tokyo Shoseki	April 25, 1986^{JP}	April 25, 1986	Unreleased	Unreleased
Sansū 2-nen: Keisan Game	Tokyo Shoseki	Tokyo Shoseki	April 25, 1986^{JP}	April 25, 1986	Unreleased	Unreleased
Sansū 3-nen: Keisan Game	Tokyo Shoseki	Tokyo Shoseki	April 25, 1986^{JP}	April 25, 1986	Unreleased	Unreleased
Sansū 4-nen: Keisan Game	Tokyo Shoseki	Tokyo Shoseki	October 30, 1986^{JP}	October 30, 1986	Unreleased	Unreleased
Sansū 5・6-nen: Keisan Game	Tokyo Shoseki	Tokyo Shoseki	October 30, 1986^{JP}	October 30, 1986	Unreleased	Unreleased
Satomi Hakkenden	Alpha Denshi	SNK	January 20, 1989^{JP}	January 20, 1989	Unreleased	Unreleased
Satsui no Kaisō: Soft House Renzoku Satsujin Jiken	Hyperware	HAL Laboratory	January 7, 1988^{JP}	January 7, 1988	Unreleased	Unreleased
SD Battle Ōzumō: Heisei Hero Basho	Banpresto	Banpresto	April 20, 1990^{JP}	April 20, 1990	Unreleased	Unreleased
SD Gundam World: Gachapon Senshi 2 - Capsule Senki	Human Entertainment	Shinsei	June 25, 1989^{JP}	June 25, 1989	Unreleased	Unreleased
SD Gundam World Gachapon Senshi 3: Eiyuu Senki	Tose	Yutaka	December 22, 1990^{JP}	December 22, 1990	Unreleased	Unreleased
SD Gundam World Gachapon Senshi 4: New Type Story	Tose	Yutaka	December 21, 1991^{JP}	December 21, 1991	Unreleased	Unreleased
SD Gundam World: Gachapon Senshi 5 - Battle of Universal Century	Tose	Yutaka	December 22, 1992^{JP}	December 22, 1992	Unreleased	Unreleased
SD Gundam Gaiden: Knight Gundam Monogatari	Tose	Bandai	August 11, 1990^{JP}	August 11, 1990	Unreleased	Unreleased
SD Gundam Gaiden: Knight Gundam Monogatari 2: Hikari no Kishi	Tose	Bandai	October 12, 1991^{JP}	October 12, 1991	Unreleased	Unreleased
SD Gundam Gaiden: Knight Gundam Monogatari 3: Densetsu no Kishi Dan	Tose	Bandai	October 23, 1992^{JP}	October 23, 1992	Unreleased	Unreleased
SD Hero Sōkessen: Taose Aku no Gundan	Interlink	Banpresto	July 7, 1990^{JP}	July 7, 1990	Unreleased	Unreleased
SD Keiji Blader	NMK	Taito	August 2, 1991^{JP}	August 2, 1991	Unreleased	Unreleased
SD Sengoku Bushō Retsuden: Rekka no Gotoku Tenka o Nusure!	Arc System Works	Banpresto	September 8, 1990^{JP}	September 8, 1990	Unreleased	Unreleased
Section Z	Capcom	Capcom	July 1987^{NA}	Unreleased	July 1987	September 27, 1989
Seicross	Nichibutsu	Nichibutsu^{JP} FCI^{NA}	May 15, 1986^{JP}	May 15, 1986	October 1988	Unreleased
Seikima II Akuma no Gyakushū!	ISCO	CBS Sony Group	December 25, 1986^{JP}	December 25, 1986	Unreleased	Unreleased
Seiryaku Simulation: Inbō no Wakusei: Shancara	IGS	IGS	June 26, 1992^{JP}	June 26, 1992	Unreleased	Unreleased
Seirei Gari	Advance Communication Company	Hudson Soft	December 8, 1989^{JP}	December 8, 1989	Unreleased	Unreleased
Sekiryūō	Sunsoft	Sunsoft	February 10, 1989^{JP}	February 10, 1989	Unreleased	Unreleased
Sesame Street: 1-2-3	Zippo Games	Hi Tech Expressions	January 1989^{NA}	Unreleased	January 1989	Unreleased
Sesame Street: A-B-C	Zippo Games	Hi Tech Expressions	September 1989^{NA}	Unreleased	September 1989	Unreleased
Sesame Street: Big Bird's Hide & Speak	Riedel Software Productions	Hi Tech Expressions	October 1990^{NA}	Unreleased	October 1990	Unreleased
Sesame Street: Countdown	Riedel Software Productions	Hi Tech Expressions	February 1992^{NA}	Unreleased	February 1992	Unreleased
Shadow Brain	Scitron & Art	Pony Canyon	March 21, 1991^{JP}	March 21, 1991	Unreleased	Unreleased
Shadow of the Ninja; Yami no Shigotonin Kage^{JP} Blue Shadow^{PAL}	Natsume	Natsume^{JP/NA} Taito^{PAL}	August 10, 1990^{JP}	August 10, 1990	December 1990	July 25, 1991
Shadowgate	Kemco	Kemco^{JP/PAL} Seika^{NA}	March 31, 1989^{JP}	March 31, 1989	December 1989	May 30, 1991
Shanghai	Sunsoft	Sunsoft	December 4, 1987^{JP}	December 4, 1987	Unreleased	Unreleased
Shanghai II	Sunsoft	Sunsoft	August 24, 1990^{JP}	August 24, 1990	Unreleased	Unreleased
Shatterhand; Tokkyū Shirei Solbrain^{JP}	Natsume	Angel^{JP} Jaleco^{NA/PAL}	October 26, 1991^{JP}	October 26, 1991	December 1991	November 19, 1992
Sherlock Holmes: Hakushaku Reijō Yūkai Jiken	Towa Chiki	Towa Chiki	December 11, 1986^{JP}	December 11, 1986	Unreleased	Unreleased
Shi-Kin-Jyo	Outback	Toei Animation	April 26, 1991^{JP}	April 26, 1991	Unreleased	Unreleased
Shin 4 Nin Uchi Mahjong: Yakuman Tengoku	Chatnoir	Nintendo	June 28, 1991^{JP}	June 28, 1991	Unreleased	Unreleased
Shin Moero!! Pro Yakyū	Jaleco	Jaleco	July 13, 1989^{JP}	July 13, 1989	Unreleased	Unreleased
Shin Satomi Hakkenden: Hikari to Yami no Tatakai	Micronics	Toei Animation	December 8, 1989^{JP}	December 8, 1989	Unreleased	Unreleased
Shingen the Ruler; Takeda Shingen 2^{JP}	Another	Hot-B	August 21, 1989^{JP}	August 21, 1989	June 1990	Unreleased
Shinsenden	Tamtex	Irem	December 15, 1989^{JP}	December 15, 1989	Unreleased	Unreleased
Shogun	Hect	Hect	May 27, 1988^{JP}	May 27, 1988	Unreleased	Unreleased
Shōnen Ashibe: Nepal Daibōken no Maki	Advance Communication Company	Takara	November 15, 1991^{JP}	November 15, 1991	Unreleased	Unreleased
Shooting Range	Tose	Bandai	June 1989^{NA}	Unreleased	June 1989	Unreleased
Short Order / Eggsplode!	Tose	Nintendo	December 1989^{NA}	Unreleased	December 1989	Unreleased
Shōgi Meikan '92	Hect	Hect	January 30, 1992^{JP}	January 30, 1992	Unreleased	Unreleased
Shōgi Meikan '93	Hect	Hect	December 4, 1992^{JP}	December 4, 1992	Unreleased	Unreleased
Shoukoushi Ceddie	Graphic Research	Fuji Television	December 24, 1988^{JP}	December 24, 1988	Unreleased	Unreleased
Shuffle Fight	Pandora Box	Banpresto	October 9, 1992^{JP}	October 9, 1992	Unreleased	Unreleased
Shufflepuck Café	Arc System Works	Pony Canyon	October 21, 1990^{JP}	October 21, 1990	Unreleased	Unreleased
Side Pocket	Data East	Namco^{JP} Data East^{NA/PAL}	October 30, 1987^{JP}	October 30, 1987	November 1987	May 27, 1992
Silent Service	Rare	Ultra Games^{NA} Konami^{PAL}	December 1989^{NA}	Unreleased	December 1989	November 23, 1990
Silk Worm	Tecmo	American Sammy	June 1990^{NA}	Unreleased	June 1990	Unreleased
Silva Saga	SETA	SETA	July 24, 1992^{JP}	July 24, 1992	Unreleased	Unreleased
Silver Surfer	Software Creations	Arcadia Systems	November 1990^{NA}	Unreleased	November 1990	Unreleased
The Simpsons: Bartman Meets Radioactive Man	Imagineering	Acclaim Entertainment	December 1992^{NA}	Unreleased	December 1992	1993
The Simpsons: Bart vs. the Space Mutants	Imagineering	Acclaim Entertainment	February 1991^{NA}	Unreleased	February 1991	December 12, 1991
The Simpsons: Bart vs. the World	Imagineering	Acclaim Entertainment	December 1991^{NA}	Unreleased	December 1991	1992
Skate or Die!	Konami	Ultra Games^{NA} Palcom Software^{PAL}	December 1988^{NA}	Unreleased	December 1988	August 17, 1990
Skate or Die 2: The Search for Double Trouble	Electronic Arts	Electronic Arts	September 1990^{NA}	Unreleased	September 1990	Unreleased
Ski or Die	Konami	Ultra Games^{NA} Palcom Software^{PAL}	February 1991^{NA}	Unreleased	February 1991	October 24, 1991
Sky Destroyer	Home Data	Taito	November 14, 1985^{JP}	November 14, 1985	Unreleased	Unreleased
Sky Kid	Namco	Namco^{JP} Sunsoft^{NA}	August 22, 1986^{JP}	August 22, 1986	September 1987	Unreleased
Sky Shark	Software Creations	Taito	September 1989^{NA}	Unreleased	September 1989	Unreleased
Slalom	Rare	Nintendo	August 1987^{NA}	Unreleased	August 1987	October 15, 1987
Smash TV	Beam Software	Acclaim Entertainment	September 1991^{NA}	Unreleased	September 1991	1991
The Smurfs	Bit Managers	Infogrames	1994^{PAL}	Unreleased	Unreleased	1994
Snake Rattle 'n' Roll	Rare	Nintendo	July 1990^{NA}	Unreleased	July 1990	March 27, 1991
Snake's Revenge	Konami	Ultra Games^{NA} Konami^{PAL}	April 1990^{NA}	Unreleased	April 1990	March 26, 1992
Snoopy's Silly Sports Spectacular; Donald Duck^{JP}	Kemco	Kemco^{JP} Seika^{NA}	September 22, 1988^{JP}	September 22, 1988	April 1990	Unreleased
Snow Brothers	Soft House	Capcom^{NA/PAL} Toaplan^{JP}	November 1991^{NA}	December 6, 1991	November 1991	1991
Soccer	Intelligent Systems	Nintendo	April 9, 1985^{JP}	April 9, 1985	October 18, 1985	January 15, 1987
Soccer League: Winners Cup	Data East; Sakata SAS	Data East	August 12, 1988^{JP}	August 12, 1988	Unreleased	Unreleased
Solar Jetman: Hunt for the Golden Warpship	Zippo Games; Rare	Tradewest^{NA} Nintendo^{PAL}	September 1990^{NA}	Unreleased	September 1990	September 26, 1991
Solomon's Key	Tecmo	Tecmo	July 30, 1986^{JP}	July 30, 1986	July 1987	March 30, 1990
Solomon's Key 2 Fire 'n Ice^{NA}	Tecmo	Tecmo	January 24, 1992^{JP}	January 24, 1992	March 1993	March 18, 1993
Solstice	Software Creations	CSG Imagesoft^{NA} Epic/Sony Records^{JP} Nintendo^{PAL}	July 1990^{NA}	July 20, 1990	July 1990	September 26, 1991
SonSon	Micronics	Capcom	February 8, 1986^{JP}	February 8, 1986	Unreleased	Unreleased
Soreike! Anpanman: Minna de Hiking Game!	Angel	Bandai	March 20, 1992^{JP}	March 20, 1992	Unreleased	Unreleased
Space Harrier	Whiteboard	Takara	January 6, 1989^{JP}	January 6, 1989	Unreleased	Unreleased
Space Hunter	Kemco	Kemco	September 25, 1986^{JP}	September 25, 1986	Unreleased	Unreleased
Space Invaders	Tose	Taito	April 17, 1985^{JP}	April 17, 1985	Unreleased	Unreleased
Space Shadow		Bandai	February 20, 1989^{JP}	February 20, 1989	Unreleased	Unreleased
Space Shuttle Project	Imagineering	Absolute Entertainment	November 1991^{NA}	Unreleased	November 1991	Unreleased
Spartan X 2	Tamtex	Irem	September 27, 1991^{JP}	September 27, 1991	Unreleased	Unreleased
Spelunker	Tamtex; Tose	Irem^{JP} Broderbund^{NA}	December 7, 1985^{JP}	December 7, 1985	September 1987	Unreleased
Spelunker II: Yūja e no Chōsen	Now Production	Irem	September 18, 1987^{JP}	September 18, 1987	Unreleased	Unreleased
Spider-Man: Return of the Sinister Six	Bits Studios	LJN	October 1992^{NA}	Unreleased	October 1992	November 29, 1992
Splatterhouse: Wanpaku Graffiti	Now Production	Namco	July 31, 1989^{JP}	July 31, 1989	Unreleased	Unreleased
Spot: The Video Game	Virgin Mastertronic	Arcadia Systems^{NA} Bullet-Proof Software^{JP}	September 1990^{NA}	October 16, 1992	September 1990	Unreleased
Spy Hunter	Sunsoft	Sunsoft	September 1987^{NA}	Unreleased	September 1987	Unreleased
Spy vs. Spy	Kemco	Kemco^{JP/PAL} Seika^{NA}	April 26, 1986^{JP}	April 26, 1986	October 1988	July 27, 1990
Sqoon	Home Data	Irem	June 26, 1986^{JP}	June 26, 1986	September 1987	Unreleased
Square no Tom Sawyer	Square	Square	November 30, 1989^{JP}	November 30, 1989	Unreleased	Unreleased
Stack-Up; Robot Block^{JP}	Nintendo R&D1; Intelligent Systems	Nintendo	July 26, 1985^{JP}	July 26, 1985	October 18, 1985	September 1, 1986
Stadium Events (Note: In North America, this game was initially released in 1987 by Bandai as Stadium Events, the same name as in Europe. A year later, Nintendo purchased the rights to publish this game in North America under the reissued title World Class Track Meet in August 1988. The game was released solely by Bandai in Japan and Europe.); World Class Track Meet^{NA} Family Trainer 2: Running Stadium^{JP}	Human Entertainment	Bandai; Nintendo^{NA}	December 23, 1986^{JP}	December 23, 1986^{JP}	September 1987	February 23, 1990
Stanley: The Search for Dr. Livingston	Sculptured Software	Electro Brain	October 1992^{NA}	Unreleased	October 1992	Unreleased
Star Force	Hudson Soft	Hudson Soft	June 25, 1985^{JP}	June 25, 1985	Unreleased	Unreleased
Star Force	Tecmo	Tecmo	November 1987^{NA}	Unreleased	November 1987	April 27, 1990
Star Luster	Namco	Namco	December 6, 1985^{JP}	December 6, 1985	Unreleased	Unreleased
Star Soldier	Hudson Soft	Hudson Soft^{JP} Taxan^{NA}	June 13, 1986^{JP}	June 13, 1986	January 1989	Unreleased
Star Trek: 25th Anniversary	Interplay Productions	Ultra Games^{NA} Konami^{PAL}	February 1992^{NA}	Unreleased	February 1992	1992
Star Trek: The Next Generation	Imagineering	Absolute Entertainment	September 1993^{NA}	Unreleased	September 1993	Unreleased
Star Voyager; Cosmo Genesis^{JP}	ASCII	ASCII^{JP} Acclaim Entertainment^{NA}	December 23, 1986^{JP}	December 23, 1986	September 1987	Unreleased
Star Wars (JP)	Namco	Namco	December 4, 1987^{JP}	December 4, 1987	Unreleased	Unreleased
Star Wars	Lucasfilm Games; Beam Software	Victor Musical Industries^{JP} JVC Musical Industries^{NA/PAL}	November 15, 1991^{JP}	November 15, 1991	November 1991	March 26, 1992
Star Wars: The Empire Strikes Back	Lucasfilm Games; Sculptured Software	Victor Musical Industries^{JP} JVC Musical Industries^{NA/PAL}	March 1992^{NA}	March 12, 1993	March 1992	1992
Starship Hector; Hector '87^{JP}	Hudson Soft	Hudson Soft	July 16, 1987^{JP}	July 16, 1987	June 1990	Unreleased
StarTropics	Nintendo R&D3; Locomotive Corporation	Nintendo	December 26, 1990^{NA}	Unreleased	December 26, 1990	August 20, 1992
Stealth ATF	Imagineering	Activision^{NA} Nintendo^{PAL}	October 1989^{NA}	Unreleased	October 1989	November 14, 1991
STED: Iseki Wakusei no Yabō	Alpha Denshi	K Amusement	July 27, 1990^{JP}	July 27, 1990	Unreleased	Unreleased
Stick Hunter: Exciting Ice Hockey	Micronics	K Amusement	December 18, 1987^{JP}	December 18, 1987	Unreleased	Unreleased
Stinger; Moero TwinBee: Cinnamon-hakase o Sukue!^{JP}	Konami	Konami	September 1987^{NA}	March 26, 1993	September 1987	Unreleased
Street Cop; Family Trainer 6: Manhattan Police^{JP}	Human Entertainment	Bandai	August 31, 1987^{JP}	August 31, 1987	June 1989	Unreleased
Street Fighter 2010: The Final Fight	Capcom	Capcom	August 8, 1990^{JP}	August 8, 1990	September 1990	Unreleased
Strider	Capcom	Capcom	July 1989^{NA}	Unreleased	July 1989	Unreleased
Sugoro Quest: Dice no Senshi Tachi	Technōs Japan	Technōs Japan	June 28, 1991^{JP}	June 28, 1991	Unreleased	Unreleased
Sukeban Deka III	Shouei System	Toei Animation	January 22, 1988^{JP}	January 22, 1988	Unreleased	Unreleased
Summer Carnival '92: Recca	KID	Naxat Soft	July 17, 1992^{JP}	July 17, 1992	Unreleased	Unreleased
Super Arabian	Sunsoft	Sunsoft	July 25, 1985^{JP}	July 25, 1985	Unreleased	Unreleased
Super Black Onyx	Bullet-Proof Software	Bullet-Proof Software	July 14, 1988^{JP}	July 14, 1988	Unreleased	Unreleased
Super C Super Contra^{JP} Probotector II: Return of The Evil Forces^{PAL}	Konami	Konami	February 2, 1990^{JP}	February 2, 1990	April 5, 1990	August 1992
Super Cars	Gremlin Graphics	Electro Brain	February 1991^{NA}	Unreleased	February 1991	Unreleased
Super Chinese 3	Culture Brain	Culture Brain	March 1, 1991^{JP}	March 1, 1991	Unreleased	Unreleased
Super Dodge Ball; Nekketsu Kōkō Dodgeball Bu^{JP}	Technōs Japan	Technōs Japan^{JP} CSG Imagesoft^{NA}	July 26, 1988^{JP}	July 26, 1988	June 1989	Unreleased
Super Dyna'mix Badminton	Pax Softnica	VAP	August 26, 1988^{JP}	August 26, 1988	Unreleased	Unreleased
Super Glove Ball	Rare	Mattel	October 1990^{NA}	Unreleased	October 1990	Unreleased
Super Jeopardy!	Imagineering	GameTek	September 1991^{NA}	Unreleased	September 1991	Unreleased
Super Mario Bros.	Nintendo R&D4	Nintendo	September 13, 1985^{JP}	September 13, 1985	October 1985 (Note: The exact NA release date is debated, as some modern sources question if Super Mario Bros. was available on launch day, though contemporaneous sources such as Computer Entertainer and The Milwaukee Journal state that the system launched with 17 titles, and the Journal references Super Mario Bros. by name.)	May 15, 1987^{EU}
Super Mario Bros. 2 Super Mario USA^{JP}	Nintendo R&D4	Nintendo	September 1988^{NA}	September 14, 1992	October 9, 1988	April 28, 1989
Super Mario Bros. 3	Nintendo R&D4	Nintendo	October 23, 1988^{JP}	October 23, 1988	February 12, 1990	August 29, 1991
Super Mogura Tataki!! Pokkun Mogura	IGS	IGS	December 8, 1989^{JP}	December 8, 1989	Unreleased	Unreleased
Super Momotaro Dentetsu	Hudson Soft	Hudson Soft	March 20, 1992^{JP}	March 20, 1992	Unreleased	Unreleased
Super Pinball	Soft Machine	Coconuts Japan	August 23, 1988^{JP}	August 23, 1988	Unreleased	Unreleased
Super Pitfall	Micronics	Pony Canyon^{JP} Activision^{NA}	September 5, 1986^{JP}	September 5, 1986	November 1987	Unreleased
Super Real Baseball '88	Pax Softnica	VAP	July 30, 1988^{JP}	July 30, 1988	Unreleased	Unreleased
Super Rugby	ZAP Corporation	TSS	December 27, 1989^{JP}	December 27, 1989	Unreleased	Unreleased
Super Spike V'Ball; V'Ball^{JP}	Technōs Japan	Technōs Japan^{JP} Nintendo^{NA/PAL}	November 10, 1989^{JP}	November 10, 1989	February 1990	January 23, 1992
Super Sprint	Tengen	Altron	August 3, 1991^{JP}	August 3, 1991	Unreleased	Unreleased
Super Spy Hunter; Battle Formula^{JP}	Sunsoft	Sunsoft	September 27, 1991^{JP}	September 27, 1991	February 1992	1992
Super Star Force: Jikūreki no Himitsu	Tecmo	Tecmo	November 11, 1986^{JP}	November 11, 1986	Unreleased	Unreleased
Super Team Games; Family Trainer 7: Famitore Daiundōkai^{JP}	Human Entertainment	Bandai^{JP} Nintendo^{NA}	November 27, 1987^{JP}	November 27, 1987	November 1988	Unreleased
Super Turrican	Rainbow Arts	Imagineer	July 22, 1993^{PAL}	Unreleased	Unreleased	July 22, 1993
Super Xevious: GAMP no Nazo	Namco; Tose	Namco	September 19, 1986^{JP}	September 19, 1986	Unreleased	Unreleased
Superman	Kemco	Kemco^{JP} Seika^{NA}	December 26, 1987^{JP}	December 26, 1987	December 1988	Unreleased
Swamp Thing	Imagineering	THQ	December 1992^{NA}	Unreleased	December 1992	1992
SWAT: Special Weapons and Tactics	Shouei System	Toei Animation	September 11, 1987^{JP}	September 11, 1987	Unreleased	Unreleased
Sweet Home	Capcom	Capcom	December 15, 1989^{JP}	December 15, 1989	Unreleased	Unreleased
Sword Master	Athena	Athena^{JP} Activision^{NA/PAL}	December 21, 1990^{JP}	December 21, 1990	January 1992	January 21, 1993
Swords and Serpents	Interplay Productions	Acclaim Entertainment	August 1990^{NA}	Unreleased	August 1990	November 28, 1991
Taboo: The Sixth Sense	Rare	Tradewest	April 1989^{NA}	Unreleased	April 1989	Unreleased
Tag Team Match: M.U.S.C.L.E. Kinnikuman: Muscle Tag Match^{JP}	Tose	Bandai	November 8, 1985^{JP}	November 8, 1985	October 1986	Unreleased
Tag Team Wrestling; Tag Team Pro Wrestling^{JP}	Data East; Sakata SAS	Namco^{JP} Data East^{NA}	April 2, 1986^{JP}	April 2, 1986	October 1986	Unreleased
Taito Chase H.Q.	Daiei Seisakusho	Taito	December 8, 1989^{JP}	December 8, 1989	Unreleased	Unreleased
Taito Grand Prix: Eikō Heno Licence	Now Production	Taito	December 18, 1987^{JP}	December 18, 1987	Unreleased	Unreleased
Taiyō no Yūsha Fighbird		Irem	January 11, 1992^{JP}	January 11, 1992	Unreleased	Unreleased
Adventure Island IV; Takahashi Meijin no Bōken Jima IV^{JP}	Now Production	Hudson Soft	June 24, 1994^{JP}	June 24, 1994	Unreleased	Unreleased
Takahashi Meijin no Bug-tte Honey	Hudson Soft	Hudson Soft	June 5, 1987^{JP}	June 5, 1987	Unreleased	Unreleased
Takeda Shingen	Another	Hot-B	March 28, 1988^{JP}	March 28, 1988	Unreleased	Unreleased
Takeshi no Chōsenjō	Nova	Taito	December 10, 1986^{JP}	December 10, 1986	Unreleased	Unreleased
Takeshi no Sengoku Fūunji	Taito	Taito	November 25, 1988^{JP}	November 25, 1988	Unreleased	Unreleased
TaleSpin	Capcom	Capcom	December 1991^{NA}	Unreleased	December 1991	September 24, 1992
Tamura Mitsuaki no Mahjong Seminar	Atelier Double	Pony Canyon	September 21, 1990^{JP}	September 21, 1990	Unreleased	Unreleased
Tanigawa Kōji no Shōgi Shinan II: Meijin e no Michi		Pony Canyon	March 18, 1988^{JP}	March 18, 1988	Unreleased	Unreleased
Tanigawa Kōji no Shōgi Shinan III		Pony Canyon	September 14, 1989^{JP}	September 14, 1989	Unreleased	Unreleased
Tantei Jingūji Saburō: Toki no Sugiyuku Mama ni...	Data East	Data East	September 28, 1990^{JP}	September 28, 1990	Unreleased	Unreleased
Tantei Jingūji Saburō: Yokohama-kō Renzoku Satsujin Jiken	Data East; Sakata SAS	Data East	February 26, 1988^{JP}	February 26, 1988	Unreleased	Unreleased
Tao	Pax Softnica	VAP	December 1, 1989^{JP}	December 1, 1989	Unreleased	Unreleased
Target: Renegade	Software Creations	Taito	March 1990^{NA}	Unreleased	March 1990	Unreleased
Tashiro Masashi no Princess ga Ippai	Tose	Epic/Sony Records	October 27, 1989^{JP}	October 27, 1989	Unreleased	Unreleased
Tatakae!! Ramenman: Sakuretsu Chōjin 102 Gei	Human Entertainment	Bandai	August 10, 1988^{JP}	August 10, 1988	Unreleased	Unreleased
Tecmo Baseball	Tecmo	Tecmo	January 1989^{NA}	Unreleased	January 1989	Unreleased
Tecmo Bowl	Tecmo	Tecmo	February 1989^{NA}	November 30, 1990	February 1989	Unreleased
Tecmo Cup Soccer Game; Captain Tsubasa^{JP} Tecmo Cup Football Game^{PAL}	Tecmo	Tecmo	April 28, 1988^{JP}	April 28, 1988	September 1992	1992
Tecmo NBA Basketball	Sculptured Software	Tecmo	November 1992^{NA}	Unreleased	November 1992	Unreleased
Tecmo Super Bowl	Tecmo	Tecmo	December 13, 1991^{JP}	December 13, 1991	December 1991	Unreleased
Tecmo World Cup Soccer	Tecmo	Tecmo	December 7, 1990^{JP}	December 7, 1990	Unreleased	1991
Tecmo World Wrestling; Gekitou Pro Wrestling!! Toukon Densetsu^{JP}	Tecmo	Tecmo	September 1, 1989^{JP}	September 1, 1989	April 1990	November 23, 1990
Teenage Mutant Ninja Turtles; Geki Kame Ninja Den^{JP} Teenage Mutant Hero Turtles^{PAL}	Konami	Konami^{JP} Ultra Games^{NA} Palcom Software^{PAL}	May 12, 1989^{JP}	May 12, 1989	June 1989	August 17, 1990
Teenage Mutant Ninja Turtles II: The Arcade Game; Teenage Mutant Ninja Turtles^{JP} Teenage Mutant Hero Turtles II: The Arcade Game^{PAL}	Konami	Konami^{JP/PAL} Ultra Games^{NA}	December 7, 1990^{JP}	December 7, 1990	December 1990	November 14, 1991
Teenage Mutant Ninja Turtles III: The Manhattan Project; Teenage Mutant Ninja Turtles II: The Manhattan Project^{JP}	Konami	Konami	December 13, 1991^{JP}	December 13, 1991	February 1992	Unreleased
Teenage Mutant Ninja Turtles: Tournament Fighters; Teenage Mutant Hero Turtles: Tournament Fighters^{PAL}	Konami	Konami	February 1994^{NA}	Unreleased	February 1994	1993
Tenchi wo Kurau II: Shokatsu Kōmei Den	Capcom	Capcom	April 5, 1991^{JP}	April 5, 1991	Unreleased	Unreleased
Tenkaichi Bushi Keru Nagūru	Game Studio	Namco	July 21, 1989^{JP}	July 21, 1989	Unreleased	Unreleased
Tenka no Goikenban: Mito Kōmon	Tose	Sunsoft	August 11, 1987^{JP}	August 11, 1987	Unreleased	Unreleased
Tennis	Nintendo R&D1; Intelligent Systems	Nintendo	January 14, 1984^{JP}	January 14, 1984	October 18, 1985	September 1, 1986
Terao no Dosukoi Ōzumō	Tose	Jaleco	November 24, 1989^{JP}	November 24, 1989	Unreleased	Unreleased
The Terminator	Radical Entertainment	Mindscape	December 1992^{NA}	Unreleased	December 1992	1992
Terminator 2: Judgment Day	Software Creations	LJN^{NA/PAL} Pack-In-Video^{JP}	February 1992^{NA/PAL}	June 26, 1992	February 1992	1992
Terra Cresta	Nichibutsu	Nichibutsu^{JP} Vic Tokai^{NA}	September 27, 1986^{JP}	September 27, 1986	March 1990	Unreleased
Tetra Star: The Fighter	Home Data	Taito	May 24, 1991^{JP}	May 24, 1991	Unreleased	Unreleased
Tetris (JP)	Bullet-Proof Software	Bullet-Proof Software	December 22, 1988^{JP}	December 22, 1988	Unreleased	Unreleased
Tetris	Nintendo R&D1	Nintendo	November 1989^{NA}	Unreleased	November 1989	February 23, 1990
Tetris 2 Tetris Flash^{JP}	Tose	Nintendo	September 21, 1993^{JP}	September 21, 1993	October 1993	1993
Tetris 2 + Bombliss	Chunsoft	Bullet-Proof Software	December 13, 1991^{JP}	December 13, 1991	Unreleased	Unreleased
Tetsudō Ō	dB-SOFT	dB-SOFT	December 12, 1987^{JP}	December 12, 1987	Unreleased	Unreleased
Tetsuwan Atom	Home Data	Konami	February 26, 1988^{JP}	February 26, 1988	Unreleased	Unreleased
Thexder	Bits Laboratory	Square	December 19, 1985^{JP}	December 19, 1985	Unreleased	Unreleased
The Three Stooges	Beam Software	Activision	October 1989^{NA}	Unreleased	October 1989	Unreleased
Thunder & Lightning; Family Block^{JP}	Visco	Romstar^{NA} Athena^{JP}	December 1990^{NA}	April 12, 1991	December 1990	Unreleased
Thunderbirds	Pack-In-Video	Pack-In-Video^{JP} Activision^{NA}	September 29, 1989^{JP}	September 29, 1989	September 1990	Unreleased
Thundercade	Micronics	American Sammy	July 1989^{NA}	Unreleased	July 1989	Unreleased
Tiger-Heli	Micronics	Pony Canyon^{JP} Acclaim Entertainment^{NA/PAL}	December 5, 1986^{JP}	December 5, 1986	September 1987	January 17, 1990
Time Lord	Rare	Milton Bradley	September 1990^{NA}	Unreleased	September 1990	1990
Time Zone	EIM	Sigma Enterprises	October 25, 1991^{JP}	October 25, 1991	Unreleased	Unreleased
Times of Lore	Toho	Toho	December 7, 1990^{JP}	December 7, 1990	May 1991	Unreleased
Tiny Toon Adventures	Konami	Konami	December 20, 1991^{JP}	December 20, 1991	December 1991	October 22, 1992
Tiny Toon Adventures 2: Trouble in Wackyland	Konami	Konami	November 27, 1992^{JP}	November 27, 1992	April 1993	January 27, 1994
Tiny Toon Adventures: Cartoon Workshop	Novotrade International	Konami	December 1992^{NA}	Unreleased	December 1992	September 27, 1993
Titan	SOFEL	SOFEL	August 10, 1990^{JP}	August 10, 1990	Unreleased	Unreleased
TM Network: Live in Power Bowl	CBS Sony Group	CBS Sony Group	December 22, 1989^{JP}	December 22, 1989	Unreleased	Unreleased
Tōjin Makyō Den: Heracles no Eikō	Data East	Data East	June 12, 1987^{JP}	June 12, 1987	Unreleased	Unreleased
To the Earth	Cirque Verte	Nintendo	November 1989^{NA}	Unreleased	November 1989	February 23, 1990
Toki; JuJu Densetsu^{JP}	Daiei Seisakusho	Taito	July 19, 1991^{JP}	July 19, 1991	December 1991	Unreleased
Toki no Tabibito: Time Stranger	Kemco	Kemco	December 26, 1986^{JP}	December 26, 1986	Unreleased	Unreleased
Tokoro-san no Mamoru mo Semeru mo	HAL Laboratory	Epic/Sony Records	June 27, 1987^{JP}	June 27, 1987	Unreleased	Unreleased
Tokyo Pachi-Slot Adventure	C-Dream	Coconuts Japan	December 13, 1991^{JP}	December 13, 1991	Unreleased	Unreleased
Tom & Jerry	Software Creations	Hi Tech Expressions^{NA/PAL} Altron^{JP}	December 1991^{NA}	November 13, 1992	December 1991	October 22, 1992
Tombs & Treasure; Taiyō no Shinden: Asteka II^{JP}	Compile	Tokyo Shoseki^{JP} Infocom^{NA}	August 3, 1988^{JP}	August 3, 1988	June 1991	Unreleased
Top Gun	Konami	Konami	November 1987^{NA}	December 11, 1987	November 1987	November 30, 1988
Top Gun: The Second Mission; Top Gun: Dual Fighters^{JP}	Konami	Konami	December 15, 1989^{JP}	December 15, 1989	January 1990	October 24, 1991
Top Players' Tennis; World Super Tennis^{JP} Four Players' Tennis^{PAL}	Home Data	Asmik^{JP/NA} Nintendo^{PAL}	October 13, 1989^{JP}	October 13, 1989	January 1990	July 28, 1994
Top Rider	Human Entertainment	Varie	December 17, 1988^{JP}	December 17, 1988	Unreleased	Unreleased
Top Striker	Namco	Namco	October 22, 1992^{JP}	October 22, 1992	Unreleased	Unreleased
Total Recall	Interplay Productions	Acclaim Entertainment	August 1990^{NA}	Unreleased	August 1990	March 21, 1991
Totally Rad; Magic John^{JP}	Aicom	Jaleco	September 28, 1990^{JP}	September 28, 1990	March 1991	1992
Touchdown Fever; Touchdown Fever: American Football^{JP}	SNK	K Amusement^{JP} SNK^{NA}	November 11, 1988^{JP}	November 11, 1988	February 1991	Unreleased
Touhou Kenbun Roku	Natsume	Natsume	November 10, 1988^{JP}	November 10, 1988	Unreleased	Unreleased
Toukon Club	Natsume	Jaleco	July 24, 1992^{JP}	July 24, 1992	Unreleased	Unreleased
The Tower of Druaga	Namco	Namco	August 6, 1985^{JP}	August 6, 1985	Unreleased	Unreleased
Town & Country Surf Designs: Wood & Water Rage	Atlus	LJN	February 1988^{NA}	Unreleased	February 1988	Unreleased
Town & Country Surf Designs II: Thrilla's Surfari	Sculptured Software	LJN	March 1992^{NA}	Unreleased	March 1992	Unreleased
Toxic Crusaders	Tose	Bandai	April 1992^{NA}	Unreleased	April 1992	Unreleased
Track & Field; Hyper Olympic^{JP} Track & Field in Barcelona^{PAL}	Konami	Konami^{JP/NA} Kemco^{PAL}	June 21, 1985^{JP}	June 21, 1985	April 1987	1992
Track & Field II; Konami Sports in Seoul^{JP}	Konami	Konami	September 16, 1988^{JP}	September 16, 1988	February 1989	November 22, 1989
Transformers: Mystery of Convoy	ISCO	Takara	December 5, 1986^{JP}	December 5, 1986	Unreleased	Unreleased
Treasure Master	Software Creations	American Softworks	December 1991^{NA}	Unreleased	December 1991	Unreleased
The Triathron	K Amusement	K Amusement	December 16, 1988^{JP}	December 16, 1988	Unreleased	Unreleased
Trog	Visual Concepts	Acclaim Entertainment	October 1991^{NA}	Unreleased	October 1991	1991
Trojan; Tatakai no Banka^{JP}	Capcom	Capcom	December 24, 1986^{JP}	December 24, 1986	February 1987	March 23, 1989
The Trolls in Crazyland; Doki! Doki! Yūenchi: Crazy Land Daisakusen^{JP}	KID	VAP^{JP} American Softworks^{PAL}	August 9, 1991^{JP}	August 9, 1991	Unreleased	1993
Tsuppari Ōzumō	Tecmo	Tecmo	September 18, 1987^{JP}	September 18, 1987	Unreleased	Unreleased
Tsuppari Wars	Sammy	Sammy	June 28, 1991^{JP}	June 28, 1991	Unreleased	Unreleased
Tsurikichi Sanpei: Blue Marlin Hen	Victor Musical Industries	Victor Musical Industries	March 17, 1988^{JP}	March 17, 1988	Unreleased	Unreleased
Tsurupika Hagemaru: Mezase! Tsuru Seko no Akashi	Jaleco	Jaleco	December 13, 1991^{JP}	December 13, 1991	Unreleased	Unreleased
TwinBee	Konami	Konami	January 4, 1986^{JP}	January 4, 1986	Unreleased	Unreleased
TwinBee 3: Poko Poko Daimaō	Konami	Konami	September 29, 1989^{JP}	September 29, 1989	Unreleased	Unreleased
Twin Cobra; Kyukyoku Tiger^{JP}	Micronics	CBS Sony Group^{JP} American Sammy^{NA}	August 4, 1989^{JP}	August 4, 1989	January 1990	Unreleased
Twin Eagle	Visco	Romstar^{NA} Visco^{JP}	October 1989^{NA}	April 12, 1991	October 1989	Unreleased
Uchūsen Cosmo Carrier	Tose	Jaleco	November 6, 1987^{JP}	November 6, 1987	Unreleased	Unreleased
Uchūkeibitai SDF	HAL Laboratory	HAL Laboratory	September 7, 1990^{JP}	September 7, 1990	Unreleased	Unreleased
Ufouria: The Saga; Hebereke^{JP}	Sunsoft	Sunsoft	September 20, 1991^{JP}	September 20, 1991	Unreleased	November 19, 1992
Ultima: Exodus	Newtopia Planning	Pony Canyon^{JP} FCI^{NA}	October 9, 1987^{JP}	October 9, 1987	February 1989	Unreleased
Ultima IV: Quest of the Avatar; Ultima: Seisha he no Michi^{JP}	Newtopia Planning; Infinity; Atelier Double (Note: US version only)	Pony Canyon^{JP} FCI^{NA}	September 20, 1989^{JP}	September 20, 1989	December 1990	Unreleased
Ultima: Warriors of Destiny	Origin Systems	FCI	January 1993^{NA}	Unreleased	January 1993	Unreleased
Ultimate Air Combat; Aces: Iron Eagle III^{JP}	Activision	Activision^{NA/PAL} Pack-In-Video^{JP}	April 1992^{NA}	August 7, 1992	April 1992	November 1992
Ultimate Basketball; Taito Basketball^{JP}	Aicom	American Sammy^{NA} Taito^{JP}	September 1990^{NA}	April 26, 1991	September 1990	Unreleased
Ultraman Club: Kaijū Dai Kessen!!	Angel	Angel	December 25, 1992^{JP}	December 25, 1992	Unreleased	Unreleased
Ultraman Club 2: Kaette Kita Ultraman Club	Interlink	Yutaka	April 7, 1990^{JP}	April 7, 1990	Unreleased	Unreleased
Ultraman Club 3: Mata Mata Shutsugeki!! Ultra Kyōdai	Interlink	Yutaka	December 29, 1991^{JP}	December 29, 1991	Unreleased	Unreleased
The Uncanny X-Men		LJN	December 1989^{NA}	Unreleased	December 1989	Unreleased
Uncharted Waters; Daikōkai Jidai^{JP}	Koei	Koei	March 15, 1991^{JP}	March 15, 1991	November 1991	Unreleased
Uninvited; Akuma no Shōtaijō^{JP}	Kemco	Kemco^{JP} Seika^{NA}	September 29, 1989^{JP}	September 29, 1989	June 1991	Unreleased
The Untouchables	Special FX Software	Ocean Software^{NA} Altron^{JP}	January 1991^{NA}	December 20, 1991	January 1991	Unreleased
Urban Champion	Nintendo R&D1	Nintendo	November 14, 1984^{JP}	November 14, 1984	August 1986	1986
Urusei Yatsura: Lum no Wedding Bell	Jaleco	Jaleco	October 23, 1986^{JP}	October 23, 1986	Unreleased	Unreleased
Ushio to Tora: Shin'en no Daiyō	Pixel; Tom Create	Yutaka	July 9, 1993^{JP}	July 9, 1993	Unreleased	Unreleased
Utsurun Desu: Kawauso Hawaii e Iku!!!	Takara	Takara	March 6, 1992^{JP}	March 6, 1992	Unreleased	Unreleased
Valis: The Fantasm Soldier	Telenet Japan	Tokuma Shoten	August 21, 1987^{JP}	August 21, 1987	Unreleased	Unreleased
Valkyrie no Bōken: Toki no Kagi Densetsu	Namco	Namco	August 1, 1986^{JP}	August 1, 1986	Unreleased	Unreleased
Vegas Connection: Casino Kara Ai wo Komete	Graphic Research	Sigma Enterprises	November 24, 1989^{JP}	November 24, 1989	Unreleased	Unreleased
Vegas Dream; Viva Las Vegas^{JP}	HAL Laboratory	Epic/Sony Records^{JP} HAL Laboratory^{NA}	September 30, 1988^{JP}	September 30, 1988	April 1990	Unreleased
Venus Senki	Human Entertainment	Varie	October 14, 1989^{JP}	October 14, 1989	Unreleased	Unreleased
Vice: Project Doom; Gun-Dec^{JP}	Aicom	Sammy	April 26, 1991^{JP}	April 26, 1991	November 1991	Unreleased
Videomation	FarSight Studios	THQ	June 1991^{NA}	Unreleased	June 1991	Unreleased
Volguard II	dB-SOFT	dB-SOFT	December 7, 1985^{JP}	December 7, 1985	Unreleased	Unreleased
Volleyball	Pax Softnica	Nintendo	March 1987^{NA}	Unreleased	March 1987	November 15, 1987
Wacky Races	Atlus	Atlus	December 25, 1991^{JP}	December 25, 1991	May 1992	Unreleased
Wagyan Land	Now Production	Namco	February 9, 1989^{JP}	February 9, 1989	Unreleased	Unreleased
Wagyan Land 2	Now Production	Namco	December 14, 1990^{JP}	December 14, 1990	Unreleased	Unreleased
Wagyan Land 3	Now Production	Namco	December 8, 1992^{JP}	December 8, 1992	Unreleased	Unreleased
Wai Wai World 2: SOS!! Parsley Jō	Konami	Konami	January 5, 1991^{JP}	January 5, 1991	Unreleased	Unreleased
Wall Street Kid; The Money Game II: Kabutochou no Kiseki^{JP}	SOFEL	SOFEL	December 20, 1989^{JP}	December 20, 1989	June 1990	Unreleased
Wario's Woods	Nintendo R&D1	Nintendo	February 19, 1994^{JP}	February 19, 1994	December 10, 1994	February 15, 1995
Warpman	Namco	Namco	July 12, 1985^{JP}	July 12, 1985	Unreleased	Unreleased
Wayne Gretzky Hockey	Bethesda Softworks	THQ	January 1991^{NA}	Unreleased	January 1991	Unreleased
Wayne's World	Radical Entertainment	THQ	November 1993^{NA}	Unreleased	November 1993	Unreleased
WCW: World Championship Wrestling; Super Star Pro Wrestling^{JP}	Nichibutsu	Pony Canyon^{JP} FCI^{NA}	December 9, 1989^{JP}	December 9, 1989	April 1990	Unreleased
A Week of Garfield	Mars Corp.	Towa Chiki	April 7, 1989^{JP}	April 7, 1989	Unreleased	Unreleased
Werewolf: The Last Warrior; Choujinrou Senki Warwolf^{JP}	Data East; Sakata SAS	Data East^{NA/PAL} Takara^{JP}	November 1990^{NA}	June 28, 1991	November 1990	September 26, 1991
Wheel of Fortune	Rare	GameTek	September 1988^{NA}	Unreleased	September 1988	Unreleased
Wheel of Fortune Family Edition	Rare	GameTek	March 1990^{NA}	Unreleased	March 1990	Unreleased
Wheel of Fortune: Featuring Vanna White	Imagitec	GameTek	January 1992^{NA}	Unreleased	January 1992	Unreleased
Wheel of Fortune Junior Edition	Rare	GameTek	October 1989^{NA}	Unreleased	October 1989	Unreleased
Where in Time Is Carmen Sandiego?	Distinctive Software	Konami	October 1991^{NA}	Unreleased	October 1991	Unreleased
Where's Waldo?	Bethesda Softworks	THQ	July 1991^{NA}	Unreleased	July 1991	Unreleased
Who Framed Roger Rabbit	Rare	LJN	September 1989^{NA}	Unreleased	September 1989	Unreleased
Whomp 'Em; Saiyūki World 2: Tenjōkai no Majin^{JP}	Jaleco	Jaleco	December 7, 1990^{JP}	December 7, 1990	March 1991	Unreleased
Widget	Graphic Research	Atlus	November 1992^{NA}	Unreleased	November 1992	Unreleased
Wild Gunman	Nintendo R&D1; Intelligent Systems	Nintendo	February 18, 1984^{JP}	February 18, 1984	October 18, 1985	February 15, 1988
Willow	Capcom	Capcom	July 18, 1989^{JP}	July 18, 1989	December 1989	1991
Wily & Right no RockBoard: That's Paradise	Capcom	Capcom	January 15, 1993^{JP}	January 15, 1993	Unreleased	Unreleased
Win, Lose or Draw	Riedel Software Productions	Hi Tech Expressions	March 1990^{NA}	Unreleased	March 1990	Unreleased
The Wing of Madoola	Sunsoft	Sunsoft	December 18, 1986^{JP}	December 18, 1986	Unreleased	Unreleased
Winter Games	Atelier Double	Acclaim Entertainment	September 1987^{NA}	Unreleased	September 1987	Unreleased
Wit's	Athena	Athena	July 13, 1990^{JP}	July 13, 1990	Unreleased	Unreleased
Wizardry: Knight of Diamonds - The Second Scenario	Game Studio	ASCII	March 9, 1990^{JP}	March 9, 1990	April 1992	Unreleased
Wizardry: Legacy of Llylgamyn - The Third Scenario	Game Studio	ASCII	February 21, 1989^{JP}	February 21, 1989	Unreleased	Unreleased
Wizardry: Proving Grounds of the Mad Overlord	Game Studio	ASCII^{JP} Nexoft^{NA}	December 22, 1987^{JP}	December 22, 1987	July 1990	Unreleased
Wizards & Warriors; Densetsu no Kishi Elrond^{JP}	Rare	Acclaim Entertainment^{NA/PAL} Jaleco^{JP}	December 1987^{NA}	July 15, 1988	December 1987	January 17, 1990
Wizards & Warriors III: Kuros: Visions of Power	Zippo Games; Rare	Acclaim Entertainment	March 1992^{NA}	Unreleased	March 1992	January 21, 1993
Wolverine	Software Creations	LJN	October 1991^{NA}	Unreleased	October 1991	Unreleased
Woody Poco	dB-SOFT	dB-SOFT	June 20, 1987^{JP}	June 20, 1987	Unreleased	Unreleased
World Boxing	Natsume	TSS	September 8, 1990^{JP}	September 8, 1990	Unreleased	Unreleased
World Champ; Great Boxing - Rush Up^{JP}	Pixel	Visco^{JP} Romstar^{NA} Taito^{PAL}	December 7, 1990^{JP}	December 7, 1990	April 1991	April 1991
World Games	Software Creations	Milton Bradley	March 1989^{NA}	Unreleased	March 1989	Unreleased
Wrath of the Black Manta; Ninja Cop Saizou^{JP}	A.I	Kyugo^{JP} Taito^{NA/PAL}	November 17, 1989^{JP}	November 17, 1989	April 1990	January 24, 1991
Wrecking Crew	Nintendo R&D1	Nintendo	June 18, 1985^{JP}	June 18, 1985	October 18, 1985	October 15, 1987
Wurm: Journey to the Center of the Earth; Chitei Senkou Bazolder^{JP}	Cyclone System	SOFEL^{JP} Asmik^{NA}	November 15, 1991^{JP}	November 15, 1991	November 1991	Unreleased
WWF King of the Ring	Gray Matter; Eastridge Technology	LJN	November 1993^{NA/PAL}	Unreleased	November 1993	1993
WWF WrestleMania	Rare	Acclaim Entertainment	February 1989^{NA}	Unreleased	February 1989	April 3, 1992
WWF WrestleMania Challenge	Rare	LJN^{NA/PAL} Hot-B^{JP}	November 1990^{NA}	March 27, 1992	November 1990	December 20, 1991
WWF WrestleMania: Steel Cage Challenge	Sculptured Software	LJN	September 1992^{NA}	Unreleased	September 1992	1992
Xenophobe	Sunsoft	Sunsoft	December 1988^{NA}	Unreleased	December 1988	Unreleased
Xevious	Namco	Namco^{JP} Bandai^{NA/PAL}	November 8, 1984^{JP}	November 8, 1984	September 1988	October 25, 1989
Xexyz; Kame no Ongaeshi - Urashima Densetsu^{JP}	Atlus	Hudson Soft	August 26, 1988^{JP}	August 26, 1988	April 1990	Unreleased
Yamamura Misa Suspense: Kyōto Hana no Misshitsu Satsujin Jiken	Tose	Taito	February 11, 1989^{JP}	February 11, 1989	Unreleased	Unreleased
Yamamura Misa Suspense: Kyōto Ryū no Tera Satsujin Jiken	Tose	Taito	December 11, 1987^{JP}	December 11, 1987	Unreleased	Unreleased
Yamamura Misa Suspense: Kyōto Zai-tech Satsujin Jiken	Tose	Hect	November 2, 1990^{JP}	November 2, 1990	Unreleased	Unreleased
Yie Ar Kung-Fu	Konami	Konami	April 22, 1985^{JP}	April 22, 1985	Unreleased	Unreleased
Yo! Noid; Kamen no Ninja Hanamaru^{JP}	Now Production	Capcom	March 16, 1990^{JP}	March 16, 1990	November 1990	Unreleased
Yōkai Club	Tose	Jaleco	May 19, 1987^{JP}	May 19, 1987	Unreleased	Unreleased
Yōkai Dōchūki	Namco	Namco	June 24, 1988^{JP}	June 24, 1988	Unreleased	Unreleased
Yoshi; Mario & Yoshi^{PAL}	Game Freak	Nintendo	December 14, 1991^{JP}	December 14, 1991	June 1992	December 10, 1992
Yoshi's Cookie	Tose	Nintendo	November 21, 1992^{JP}	November 21, 1992	April 1993	April 28, 1994
The Young Indiana Jones Chronicles	Chris Gray Enterprises; Jaleco	Jaleco	December 1992^{NA}	Unreleased	December 1992	Unreleased
Ys	Advance Communication Company	Victor Musical Industries	August 26, 1988^{JP}	August 26, 1988	Unreleased	Unreleased
Ys II	Advance Communication Company	Victor Musical Industries	May 25, 1990^{JP}	May 25, 1990	Unreleased	Unreleased
Ys III: Wanderers from Ys	Advance Communication Company	Victor Musical Industries	September 27, 1991^{JP}	September 27, 1991	Unreleased	Unreleased
Yume Penguin Monogatari	Konami	Konami	January 25, 1991^{JP}	January 25, 1991	Unreleased	Unreleased
Zanac	Compile	FCI	October 1987^{NA}	Unreleased	October 1987	Unreleased
Zelda II: The Adventure of Link	Nintendo R&D4	Nintendo	September 26, 1988^{PAL}	Unreleased	December 1, 1988	September 26, 1988
Zen: Intergalactic Ninja	Konami	Konami	March 1993^{NA}	Unreleased	March 1993	1993
Zippy Race	Irem	Irem	July 18, 1985^{JP}	July 18, 1985	Unreleased	Unreleased
Zoda's Revenge: StarTropics II	Nintendo R&D3; Locomotive Corporation	Nintendo	March 1994^{NA}	Unreleased	March 1994	Unreleased
Zoids: Chūō Tairiku no Tatakai	Micronics	Toshiba EMI	September 5, 1987^{JP}	September 5, 1987	Unreleased	Unreleased
Zoids 2: Zenebasu no Gyakushū	Micronics	Toshiba EMI	January 27, 1989^{JP}	January 27, 1989	Unreleased	Unreleased
Zoids: Mokushiroku	Tomy	Tomy	December 21, 1990^{JP}	December 21, 1990	Unreleased	Unreleased
Zombie Hunter	Lenar	Hi-Score Media Work	July 3, 1987^{JP}	July 3, 1987	Unreleased	Unreleased
Zombie Nation; Abarenbou Tengu^{JP}	KAZe	Meldac	December 14, 1990^{JP}	December 14, 1990	January 1991	Unreleased
Zunō Senkan Galg	dB-SOFT	dB-SOFT	December 14, 1985^{JP}	December 14, 1985	Unreleased	Unreleased

== Compilations ==
Title	Developer(s)	Publisher(s)	First released	Release date		
Title	Developer(s)	Publisher(s)	First released	JP	NA	PAL
2-in-1 Super Mario Bros./Duck Hunt	Nintendo R&D4; Nintendo R&D1; Intelligent Systems	Nintendo	November 1988^{NA}	Unreleased	November 1988	December 1988
2-in-1 Super Spike V'Ball/Nintendo World Cup	Technōs Japan	Nintendo	December 1990^{NA}	Unreleased	December 1990	Unreleased
3-in-1 Super Mario Bros./Duck Hunt/World Class Track Meet	Nintendo R&D4; Nintendo R&D1; Intelligent Systems; Human Entertainment	Nintendo	December 1990^{NA}	Unreleased	December 1990	Unreleased
3-in-1 Super Mario Bros./Tetris/Nintendo World Cup	Nintendo R&D4; Nintendo R&D1; Technōs Japan	Nintendo	1991^{PAL}	Unreleased	Unreleased	1991
Donkey Kong Classics	Nintendo R&D2	Nintendo	October 1988^{NA}	Unreleased	October 1988	August 10, 1989
Final Fantasy I∙II	Square	Square	February 27, 1994^{JP}	February 27, 1994	Unreleased	Unreleased
Sesame Street: A-B-C & 1-2-3	Zippo Games	Hi Tech Expressions	November 1991^{NA}	Unreleased	November 1991	Unreleased

== Championship games ==
Title	Developer(s)	Publisher(s)	Release date
Nintendo Campus Challenge 1991	Nintendo	Nintendo	1991
Nintendo World Championships 1990	Nintendo	Nintendo	March 1990

== Konami QTa Adaptor games ==
Title	Developer(s)	Publisher(s)	JP
Idemitsu - Space College - Kikenbutsu no Yasashii Butsuri to Kagaku	Konami	Konami	1990
NHK Gakuen - Space School - Sansu 4 Nen (Ge)	Konami	Konami	1989
NHK Gakuen - Space School - Sansu 4 Nen (Jou)	Konami	Konami	1989
NHK Gakuen - Space School - Sansu 5 Nen (Ge)	Konami	Konami	1989
NHK Gakuen - Space School - Sansu 5 Nen (Jou)	Konami	Konami	1989
NHK Gakuen - Space School - Sansu 6 Nen (Ge)	Konami	Konami	1989
NHK Gakuen - Space School - Sansu 6 Nen (Jou)	Konami	Konami	1989

== Bandai Datach games ==
Title	Developer(s)	Publisher(s)	JP
Crayon Shin-Chan: Ora to Poi Poi	Tose	Bandai	August 27, 1993
Battle Rush: Build Up Robot Tournament	Tose	Bandai	November 13, 1993
Dragon Ball Z: Gekitō Tenkaichi Budokai	Tose	Bandai	December 29, 1992
J. League Super Top Players	Tose	Bandai	April 22, 1994
SD Gundam: Gundam Wars	Tose	Bandai	April 23, 1993
Ultraman Club: Supokon Fight!	Tose	Bandai	April 23, 1993
Yū Yū Hakusho: Bakutō Ankoku Bujutsu Kai	Tose	Bandai	October 22, 1993

== Unreleased games ==
Title	Year	Publisher	Region(s)
The Adventures of Dr. Franken	1993	Elite	NA
Airball	1990	Tengen	NA
Arc Hound	1992	Konami	JP
Armadillo	1991	IGS	NA
Armadillo II	1992	IGS	JP
Battle Choice	1989	Konami	JP
Bio Force Ape	1992	SETA	JP
Bashi Bazook: Morphoid Masher		Jaleco	NA
Blazeblasters	1991	Nexoft	NA
Blockout	1990	Technōs Japan	NA
Buster Bros.	1993	Hudson Soft	NA
Buzz & Waldog		Innovation	NA
The California Raisins: The Grape Escape	1990	Capcom	NA
Card Sharks	1988	GameTek	NA
Cheetahmen II	1993	Active Enterprises	NA
Chip's Challenge	1991	Bullet-Proof Software	NA
Chuck Yeager's Fighter Combat	1993	Electronic Arts	NA
Crash 'n the Boys: Ice Challenge	1992	Technōs Japan	NA
Crash 'n the Boys: Soccer Challenge	1994	Technōs Japan	NA
Cyberball (unlicensed version)		Tengen	NA
Danger Zone	1989	Tradewest	NA
Days of Thunder (unreleased version)	1990	Mindscape	NA
Dennis the Menace	1993	Ocean Software	NA
Dewey the Dolphin	1990	Ocean Software	NA
Donkey Kong no Ongaku Asobi	1983	Nintendo	JP
Double Play	1989	Tradewest	NA
Drac's Night Out	1991	Parker Brothers	NA
Earth Bound (Note: In 2015, it was officially localized on the Wii U's Virtual Console as EarthBound Beginnings.)	1990	Nintendo	NA
Erik the Viking	1992	Video System	NA
Escape from Atlantis		Color Dreams	NA
Exploding Fist	1991	Tradewest	NA
The Fairyland Story	1986	Taito	JP
Felix the Cat	1992	Hudson Soft	JP
Final Fantasy II	1988	Square	NA
Final Fantasy IV	1991	Square	JP
Fun House (unreleased version)	1990	Hi Tech Expressions	NA
Happy Camper	1990	Color Dreams	NA
Happily Ever After	1991	SOFEL	NA
Hard Drivin'	1990	Tengen	NA
Hellraiser	1990	Color Dreams	NA
HeroQuest	1991	Milton Bradley	NA
Hit the Ice	1993	Taito	NA
Ivan 'Ironman' Stewart's Super Off Road	1991	Pack-in-Video	JP
John Madden Football '93	1992	Ubi Soft	NA
Kung Fu 2	1991	Irem	NA
Loopz	1991	Mindscape International Japan	JP
NBA	1989	LJN	NA
Neo Vulgus	1988	Capcom	JP
New Kids on the Block	1991	Parker Brothers	NA
Ninja Taro	1989	American Sammy	NA
Parody World: Monster Party	1989	Bandai	JP
Password	1988	GameTek	NA
Pescatore	1991	Sunsoft	JP, NA
Pizza Pop	1992	Jaleco	NA
Police Academy	1990	Tengen	NA
The Price is Right	1988	GameTek	NA
Rampart (unlicensed version)		Tengen	NA
Return of Donkey Kong		Nintendo	NA
Road Runner (licensed version)		Mindscape	NA
RoboCop vs. the Terminator	1993	Virgin Interactive Entertainment	NA
Secret Ties	1992	Vic Tokai	NA
Shounen Majutsushi Indy	1992	IGS Corp.	JP
SimCity	1991	Nintendo	NA
Soldam	1993	Jaleco	JP
Splatterworld: Rick to Kyoufu no Daiou	1993	Namco	JP
Spy vs. Spy II: The Island Caper	1989	Kemco	NA
Square Racing	1990	Square	JP
Squashed	1991	Jaleco	NA
Star Trek V: The Final Frontier	1989	Bandai	NA
Strider Hiryuu	1988	Capcom	JP
Sunman	1992	Sunsoft	JP, NA
Super Password	1989	GameTek	NA
Super Pitfall 2	1989	Activision	NA
Sydney Hunter and the Curse of the Mayan		CollectorVision	NA
Talking Super Password	1990	GameTek	NA
Technocop	1992	Tengen	NA
The Terminator (unreleased version)	1989	Sunsoft	NA
Thomas the Tank Engine & Friends	1993	THQ	NA
Time Diver: Eon Man	1993	Taito	NA
Tip Off	1992	Imagineer	JP, EU
Titan Warriors	1988	Capcom	NA
Trivial Pursuit	1991	Parker Brothers	NA
Twin Peaks	1991	Hi Tech Expressions	NA
UWC		SETA	NA
Vindicators	1990	Altron	JP
War on Wheels	1991	Jaleco	NA
World War III	1989	LJN	NA
Xybots	1990	Tengen	NA

== Unlicensed games ==
=== NES's lifespan ===
Title	Publisher	Year
2-in-1 Cosmocop / Cyber Monster	Sachen	1993
2-in-1 Tough Cop / Super Tough Cop	Sachen	1993
2 Turn Pair	Hwang Shinwei	1991
3D Block	Hwang Shinwei	1989/1990
Action 52	Active Enterprises	1991
The Adventures of Captain Comic	Color Dreams	1989
After Burner	Tengen	1989
Alien Syndrome	Tengen	1989
Auto Upturn	Sachen	1991
Baby Boomer	Color Dreams	1989
BB Car	Hwang Shinwei	1991
Bee 52	Camerica	1992
Bible Adventures	Wisdom Tree	1991
Bible Buffet	Wisdom Tree	1993
Big Nose Freaks Out	Camerica	1992
Big Nose the Caveman	Camerica	1991
Bingo 75	Sachen	1990
Blackjack	American Video Entertainment	1992
Block Force	Hwang Shinwei	1990
Brush Roller	Hwang Shinwei	1990
Bubble Bath Babes	Panesian	1991
Caltron 6 in 1	Caltron	1992
Castle of Deceit	Bunch Games	1990
Challenge of the Dragon	Color Dreams	1990
Chess Academy	Sachen	1991
Chiller	American Game Cartridges (NA); HES (AU)	1990
China Chess	Hwang Shinwei	Unknown
Chinese Checkers	Sachen	1991
Chinese Kung Fu	Sachen	1989
Crystal Mines	Color Dreams	1989
Dancing Block	Sachen	1990
Death Race	American Game Cartridges	1990
Deathbots	American Video Entertainment	1990
Decathlon	C&E	1992
Dizzy the Adventurer	Codemasters	1993
Double Strike	American Video Entertainment (NA); HES (AU)	1990
Dragon Ball Z 5	SuperTone Electronics	1995
Duck Maze	HES	1990
Dudes with Attitude	American Video Entertainment	1990
Elfland	Tip Top	1992
Exodus	Wisdom Tree	1991
F-15 City War	American Video Entertainment (NA); HES (AU)	1990
F18 Race	Hwang Shinwei	1990
The Fantastic Adventures of Dizzy	Camerica (NA); Codemasters (EU)	1991
Fantasy Zone	Tengen	1989
Feng Shen Bang	C&E	1995
Final Combat	Sachen	1992
Firehawk	Camerica	1991
Frog Adventure	Sachen	1992
Frog River	Hwang Shinwei	1990
Gaiapolis	Sachen	1990
Galactic Crusader	Bunch Games	1990
Gauntlet	Tengen	1989
Gluk the Thunder Warrior	Gluk	1992
The Great Wall	Sachen	1992
Happy Pairs	Sachen	1991
Hell Fighter	Sachen	1991
Hidden Chinese Chess	Joy Van	1989
Honey Peach	Sachen	1990
Hot Slots	Panesian	1991
Huge Insect	Sachen	1993
Impossible Mission II	American Video Entertainment	1990
Incantation	Joy Van	1989
Indiana Jones and the Temple of Doom	Tengen	1989
Jing Ke Xin Zhuan	SuperTone Electronics	1992
Joshua & the Battle of Jericho	Wisdom Tree	1992
Jovial Race	Joy Van	1989
Jurassic Boy	Sachen	1990
Kart Fighter	Ge De Industry Co.	1993
King Neptune's Adventure	Color Dreams	1990
King of Kings: The Early Years	Wisdom Tree	1991
Klax	Tengen	1990
Krazy Kreatures	American Video Entertainment	1990
Linus Spacehead's Cosmic Crusade	Camerica	1992
Little Red Hood	HES	1989
Locksmith	Sachen	1991
Lucky 777	Sachen	1989
Magic Block	Mega Soft	1991
Magic Cube	Sachen	1991
Magic Jewelry	Hwang Shinwei	1990
Magic Jewelry II	Hwang Shinwei	1991
Magical Mathematics	Sachen	1990
Magical Tower	Tin Chen	1992
Mahjong Academy	Sachen	1992
Mahjong Trap	Sachen	1990
Mahjong Trap Plus	Sachen	1990
The Mahjong World	Sachen	1990
Master Chu and the Drunkard Hu	Color Dreams	1989
Maxi 15	American Video Entertainment	1992
Mēi Shāo Nú Mèng Gōngchāng	Tin Chen	Unknown
Memory Pair	Hwang Shinwei	1991
Menace Beach	Color Dreams	1990
Mermaids of Atlantis	American Video Entertainment	1991
Metal Fighter	Color Dreams	1989
Micro Machines	Camerica	1991
Middle School English II	Sachen	1989
MiG-29: Soviet Fighter	Camerica	1991
Millionaire	Sachen	1990
Minesweeper	Sachen	1989
Minesweeper 2	Sachen	1989
Minesweeper 3	Sachen	1989
Mission Cobra	Bunch Games	1990
Moon Ranger	Bunch Games	1990
Ms. Pac-Man	Tengen	1990
Myriad 6 in 1	Myriad	1992
Olympic IQ	Sachen	1991
Operation Secret Storm	Color Dreams	1992
Pac-Man	Tengen	1989
Pac-Mania	Tengen	1990
Peek-A-Boo Poker	Panesian	1991
The Penguin and Seal	Sachen	1989
Pesterminator: The Western Exterminator	Color Dreams	1990
Piano	Hwang Shinwei	Unknown
Pipe V	Sachen	1990
Poker II	Sachen	1990
Poker III	Sachen	1991
Poker Mahjong	Sachen	1991
Pole Chudes	A. Chudov	1995
Popo Team	Sachen	1991
The P'Radikus Conflict	Color Dreams	1990
Punch Sprite	Hwang Shinwei	1990
Puzzle	American Video Entertainment	1990
Pyramid	American Video Entertainment	1990
Pyramid II	Sachen	1990
Q Boy	Sachen	1994
Quattro Adventure	Camerica	1991
Quattro Arcade	Camerica	1992
Quattro Sports	Camerica	1992
Rad Racket: Deluxe Tennis II	American Video Entertainment	1991
Raid 2020	Color Dreams	1989
R.B.I. Baseball	Tengen	1989
R.B.I. Baseball 2	Tengen	1990
R.B.I. Baseball 3	Tengen	1991
Road Runner	Tengen	1989
Robodemons	Color Dreams	1990
Rockball	Sachen	1993
Rocman X	Sachen	1995
Rolling Thunder	Tengen	1989
Secret Scout in the Temple of Demise	Color Dreams	1991
Shinobi	Tengen	1989
Shockwave	American Game Cartridges	1990
Sidewinder	Joy Van	1989
Silent Assault	Color Dreams	1990
Silver Eagle	Sachen	1994
Skull & Crossbones	Tengen	1990
Solitaire	American Video Entertainment	1992
Somari	Ge De Industry Co.	1994
Spiritual Warfare	Wisdom Tree	1992
Strategist	Sachen	1991
Street Heroes	Sachen	1995
Stunt Kids	Camerica	1992
Sunday Funday	Wisdom Tree	1995
Super Mario World	J.Y. Company	1995
Super Pang	Sachen	1991
Super Pang II	Sachen	1992
Super Sprint	Tengen	1989
Tagin' Dragon	Bunch Games	1990
Taiwan Mahjong	Sachen	1989
Taiwan Mahjong II	Sachen	1992
Tasac	Sachen	1992
Tetris	Tengen	1989
Tiles of Fate	American Video Entertainment	1990
Time Diver Avenger	Nitra Corporation	1994
Toobin'	Tengen	1989
Trolls on Treasure Island	American Video Entertainment	1992
Twin Eagle	Joy Van	1989
Ugadayka	A. Chudov	1995
Ultimate League Soccer	American Video Entertainment	1991
The Ultimate Stuntman	Camerica	1990
Venice Beach Volleyball	American Video Entertainment	1991
Vindicators	Tengen	1989
Wally Bear and the NO! Gang	American Video Entertainment	1991
Wild Ball	Hwang Shinwei	1991
The World of Card Games	Sachen	1990
Worm Visitor	Sachen	1992

=== Famicom games ===
Title	Year	Publisher	Country
1991 Du Ma Racing	1991	Super Mega	Taiwan
2 in 1: Cosmocop and Cyber Monster	1993	Sachen	Taiwan
2 in 1: Tough Cop and Super Tough Cop	1993	Sachen	Taiwan
Adam & Eve	1991	NTDEC	Taiwan
Aladdin	1995	J.Y. Company	Taiwan
Aladdin II	1995 June	Unknown	Taiwan
Auto-Upturn	1991	Sachen	Taiwan
AV Bishoujo Senshi Girl Fighting	1994	Ge De Industry Co.	Taiwan
AV Jiu Ji Ma Jiang II	1995	Ge De Industry Co.	Taiwan
AV Dragon Mahjang	1991	Hacker International	Japan
AV Mahjong Club	1991	Hacker International	Japan
AV Pachi Slot: Big Chance	1991	Hacker International	Japan
AV Poker	1990	Hacker International	Japan
AV Super Real Pachinko	1991	Hacker International	Japan
AV World Soccer	1991	Hacker International	Japan
Ball Story - Jong Yuk Chuen Suet Fa Jong II	1993	Sun Team Corp.	China
Balloon Monster	1991	NTDEC	Taiwan
Bao Qing Tian	1996	Ka Sheng	Taiwan
Bao Xiao San Guo	Unknown	Fuzhou Waixing Computer Science & Technology Co., LTD	China
Bio Hazard	2003	Fuzhou Waixing Computer Science & Technology Co., LTD	China
Black Dragon	1991	Daou Infosys	South Korea
Bingo 75	1990	Sachen	Taiwan
Bomber Boy	1997	Super Game	Taiwan
Boogerman	1997	Super Game	Taiwan
Boogerman 2: The Final Adventure	1997	Rex Soft	Taiwan
Bookyman	1991	NTDEC	Taiwan
Caltron 6-in-1	1991	NTDEC	Taiwan
Challenge of the Dragon	1990	Sachen	Taiwan
Chess Academy	1990	Sachen	Taiwan
Chinese Checkers	1991	Sachen	Taiwan
Chongwu - Feicui	2002	Fuzhou Waixing Computer Science & Technology Co., LTD	China
Chu Han Zheng Ba: War Between Chu and Han	1997	Fuzhou Waixing Computer Science & Technology Co., LTD	China
Contra Spirits	1997	Hosenkan Electronics	Taiwan
Cosmos Cop	1991	NTDEC	Taiwan
Colorful Dragon	1989	Sachen	Taiwan
Crayon Shin-Chan	1995	Future Media	Taiwan
Crystal Commando	1991	Daou Infosys	South Korea
Dancing Block	1990	Sachen	Taiwan
Dao Shuai	1989	Sachen	Taiwan
Destroyer	1991	NTDEC	Taiwan
Decathlon	1992	Computer & Entertainment	Taiwan
Dian Shi Ma Li	1989	Fiver Firm	Taiwan
Donkey Kong Country 4	1997	J.Y. Company	Taiwan
Dooly Bravo Land	1992	Daou Infosys	South Korea
The Dragon	1995	Ramar International Co., LTD.	Taiwan
Dragon Ball Z - Super Butoden 2	1994	J.Y. Company	Taiwan
Dragon Ball Z 5	1995	Rex Soft	Taiwan
Earthworm Jim 2 (Super Game)	1997	Super Game	Taiwan
Earthworm Jim 2 (Shin-Shin)	1996	Ka Sheng	Taiwan
Earthworm Jim 3	1997	Ka Sheng	Taiwan
Family Noraebang	1993	Daou Infosys	South Korea
Felix the Cat	1998 July 9	Dragon Co.	China
Feng Kuang Ji Dan Zi	2001	Fuzhou Waixing Computer Science & Technology Co., LTD	China
Fighting Hero	1991	NTDEC	Taiwan
Final Combat	1992	Sachen	Taiwan
Final Fight 3	1998	J.Y. Company	Taiwan
Fire Dragon	Unknown	Gamtec	Taiwan
Flying Superboy	1991	Daou Infosys	South Korea
Gaiapolis	1994	Sachen	Taiwan
Galactic Crusader^{TW} Papillon Gals^{JP}	1989	Sachen^{TW} Kinema Music^{JP}	Taiwan, Japan
Garou Densetsu Special	1995	Ge De Industry Co.	Taiwan
The Great Wall	1992	Sachen	Taiwan
Hanafuda Yūkyōde Nagarebana Oryu	1991	Hacker International	Japan
Happy Biqi III: World Fighter	1996	Fuzhou Waixing Computer Science & Technology Co., LTD	China
Happy Pairs	1991	Sachen	Taiwan
Hayama Reiko: Katsuragi Mayako no AV Hanafuda Club	1991	Hacker International	Japan
Hee-dong Ei's Adventures	1991	Daou Infosys	South Korea
Hell Fighter	1991	Sachen	Taiwan
Hidden Chinese Chess	1989	Sachen	Taiwan
Hong Lou Meng	Unknown	Dragon Co.	China
Honey Peach	1990	Sachen	Taiwan
Huang Di: Zhuolu zhi Zhan	Unknown	Asder	Taiwan
Huge Insect	1993 but released in the early 2000s	Sachen	Taiwan
Idol Shisen Mahjong	1990	Hacker International	Japan
Janggun-ui Adeul	1992	Daou Infosys	South Korea
Jovial Race	1989	Sachen	Taiwan
Joyvan Kid^{TW} Metal Fighter μ^{JP}	1989^{TW} October 30, 1991^{JP}	Sachen^{TW} Kinema Music^{JP}	Taiwan, Japan
Jurassic Boy	1994	Sachen	Taiwan
Kart Fighter	1993	Ge De Industry Co.	Hong Kong
The King of Fighters '97	1997	Rex Soft	Taiwan
King Tank	1993	Gamtec	Taiwan
Klax	1991	Daou Infosys	South Korea
Koko Adventure	1993	Daou Infosys	South Korea
The Lion King III: Timon & Pumbaa	1997	Dragon Co.	China
The Lion King V: Timon & Pumbaa	1998	Dragon Co.	China
Little Red Hood	1989	Sachen	Taiwan
Locksmith	1991	Sachen	Taiwan
The Lost World: Jurassic Park	1998	Hosenkan Electronics	Taiwan
Lucky 777	1989	Sachen	Taiwan
Luan Shi San Guo	Unknown	Dragon Co.	China
Lu Ye Xian Zong	1996	E.S.C. Co. Ltd	China
Magic Kid Googoo	1992	Zemina	South Korea
Magical Mathematics	1990	Sachen	Taiwan
Magic Cube	1991	Sachen	Taiwan
Mahjong Academy	Unknown	Sachen	Taiwan
Mahjong Companion	1990	Sachen^{TW} Hacker International^{JP}	Taiwan, Japan
Mahjong Summit Kabukichou Hen	1990	Hacker International	Japan
Mahjong Trap^{TW} Shisen Mahjong: Seifuku Hen^{JP}	1990	Sachen^{TW} Hacker International^{JP}	Taiwan, Japan
Metal Force	1994	Daou Infosys	South Korea
Middle School English	1989	Sachen	Taiwan
Millionaire	1990	Sachen	Taiwan
Mickey Mania 7	1996	J.Y. Company	Taiwan
Mighty Morphin Power Rangers III	1995	J.Y. Company	Taiwan
Miss Peach World	1991	Hacker International	Japan
Mortal Kombat II (Hummer Team)	1994	J.Y. Company	Taiwan
Mortal Kombat II (Yoko)	1994	Yoko Soft	Taiwan
Mortal Kombat II Special	1995	J.Y. Company	Taiwan
Mortal Kombat 3	Unknown	Super Game	Taiwan
Mortal Kombat 5	1998	Hosenkan Electronics	Taiwan
Octagon	1991	Daou Infosys	South Korea
Olympic I.Q.	1991	Sachen	Taiwan
One-eyed Jack	1991	Daou Infosys	South Korea
Panda Baby	1997	Dragon Co.	China
The Panda Prince	1996	Ka Sheng	Taiwan
The Penguin and Seal	1989	Sachen	Taiwan
Pipe V	1990	Sachen	Taiwan
Pocahontas Part 2	1997	Super Game	Taiwan
Pocohontos	1997	Hosenkan Electronics	Taiwan
Poker II	1990	Sachen	Taiwan
Poker III	1991	Sachen	Taiwan
Poker Mahjong	1991	Sachen	Taiwan
Pokémon Gold	Unknown	Fuzhou Waixing Computer Science & Technology Co., LTD, Yancheng	China
Popo Team	1992	Sachen	Taiwan
Pyramid^{TW} Pyramid Cleopatra Kiki Ippatsu^{JP}	1990	Sachen^{TW} Hacker International^{JP}	Taiwan, Japan
Pyramid II	1990	Sachen	Taiwan
Q Boy	1994	Sachen	Taiwan
Raid/Tu Ji	1989	Sachen	Taiwan
Road Runner X	1991	Daou Infosys	South Korea
Rockball	1993	Sachen	Taiwan
Rocman X	1995	Sachen	Taiwan
Samurai Spirits	1995	Rex Soft	Taiwan
Shin Samurai Spirits 2	1996 June	J.Y. Company	Taiwan
Sidewinder	1989	Sachen	Taiwan
Silver Eagle	1994	Sachen	Taiwan
Soap Panic	1991	Hacker International	Japan
Somari	1994 March 1	Ge De Industry Co.	Taiwan, South Korea, Japan
Strategist	1991	Sachen	Taiwan
Street Fighter II: The World Warrior	1992	Yoko Soft	Taiwan
Street Fighter II Pro	1993	Cony Soft	Taiwan
Street Heroes	1994	Sachen	Taiwan
Super Aladdin	Unknown	Super Game	Taiwan
Super Contra 7	1996	E.S.C. Co. Ltd	China
Super Contra X	1994	TXC Corporation	Taiwan
Super Donkey Kong	1997	Hosenkan Electronics	Taiwan
Super Donkey Kong - Xiang Jiao Chuan	1994	Liang Yi Productions	Taiwan
Super Lion King	Unknown	Super Game	Taiwan
Super Shinobi	1997	Super Game	Taiwan
Super Mario World	1995	J.Y. Company	Taiwan
Super Maruo	1986?	Unknown	Japan
Super Pang	1991	Sachen	Taiwan
Super Pang II	1992	Sachen	Taiwan
Tasac	1992	Sachen	Taiwan
Taiwan 16 Mahjong	1989	Sachen	Taiwan
Taiwan Mahjong II	1992	Sachen	Taiwan
Tekken 2	1996	J.Y. Company	Taiwan
Thunderbolt 2	1996	Gamtec	Taiwan
Tiny Toon Adventures 6	1997	J.Y. Company	Taiwan
Tom & Jerry 3	1998	Dragon Co.	China
Tube Exploration	1991	Daou Infosys	South Korea
Twin Eagle	1989	Sachen	Taiwan
The Universe Soldiers	1993	Gamtec	Taiwan
Utaco	Unknown	Miguel	Japan
Wait and See!	1997	Dragon Co.	China
Wisdom Boy	Unknown	Gamtec	Taiwan
World Heroes 2	1994	Cony Soft	Taiwan
The World of Card Games	1990	Sachen	Taiwan
Xiao Ma Li	1989 or 1990	Idea-Tek, C&E, TXC	Taiwan
Zhong Guo Da Heng	Unknown	Sachen	Taiwan

=== After lifespan ===
Title	Publisher	Year
Almost Hero	Mega Cat Studios	2017
Angry Video Game Nerd 8-Bit	Retroware	2025
Battle Kid: Fortress of Peril	Sivak Games	2010
Battle Kid: Kikenna Wana	Columbus Circle	2018
Battle Kid 2: Mountain of Torment	Sivak Games	2012
Beat 'Em & Eat 'Em	FG Soft	2014
Blazing Rangers	First Press Games	2021
D-Pad Hero	dpadhero.com	2009
D-Pad Hero 2	dpadhero.com	2010
Data East All-Star Collection	Retro-Bit	2017
Dreamworld Pogie	Codemasters	2016
Expedition	Mega Cat Studios	2017
Feng Yin Dao	Shenzhen Nanjing Technology	2005
Final Fantasy VII	Shenzhen Nanjing Technology	2005
Free Fall	Piko Interactive	2017
Galf	Limited Run Games	2018
Garbage Pail Kids: Mad Mike and the Quest for Stale Gum	iam8bit	2022
Holy Diver	Irem	2018
Jay and Silent Bob: Mall Brawl	Limited Run Games	2020
Lei Dian Huang Bi Ka Qiu Chuan Shuo	Shenzhen Nanjing Technology	2004
Log Jammers	Mega Cat Studios	2018
Mega Man 2 Anniversary Edition	iAM8bit	2017
Micro Mages	Morphcat Games	2019
Mystery World Dizzy	Codemasters	2017
NEO Heiankyo Alien	Columbus Circle	2017
Pokémon LeafGreen	Henggedianzi	2009
Quest Forge: By Order of Kings	Piko Interactive	2015
RacerMate Challenge II	RacerMate	1996
Rugrats: Adventures in Gameland	TheMIX Games; Limited Run Games	2024
Shen Qi De Mao Zi	Shenzhen Nanjing Technology	2005
Snakky	Piko Interactive	2017
Super Russian Roulette	Batlab Electronics	2017
Super Tilt Bro.	Sylvain Gadrat	2024
Titanic	Shenzhen Nanjing Technology	2005
Undercover Shot	Pirate Princess Games	2025
Wisdom Tree NES Collection	Wisdom Tree	2016
Wonderland Dizzy	Codemasters	2015
Zelda: Triforce of the Gods	Fuzhou Waixing Computer Science & Technology Co., LTD	2004

== See also ==
- List of best-selling Nintendo Entertainment System video games
- List of cancelled NES games
- List of Family BASIC games
- List of Famicom Disk System games
- Lists of video games
