= List of Nintendo Entertainment System accessories =

This is a list of accessories released for the Family Computer and Nintendo Entertainment System by Nintendo and other various third party manufacturers.

== Family Computer ==
Since the Famicom lacked traditional game controller ports, third-party controllers were designed for use with the console's expansion slot.

Accessory Name	Description	Manufacturer	Ref.
Arkanoid Controller	Specific controller for three Arkanoid games.	Taito	
ASCII Stick L5	One handed Famicom controller.	ASCII Corporation	
Bandai Karaoke Studio	Famicom Microphone and unit that operates on its own cartridges	Bandai	
Barcode Battler II	Connected via a cable included in Barcode World	Epoch Co.	
BPS-Max	NES-Max equivalent for the Famicom	Bullet-Proof Software	
Datach	Mini-Cartridge adaptor with barcode reader	Bandai	
FamiCoin	Licensed colored "coins" that can be placed on the controller's directional pad (possibly to provide extra grip or reduce the "Nintendo thumb")	Taito	
Famicom 3D System	A liquid crystal shutter headset which gave compatible games the illusion of 3D depth, like the Master System's SegaScope 3D glasses.	Nintendo	
Famicom Data Recorder	Device for saving and loading programs onto standard audio cassettes for programs made in Family BASIC. The Data Recorder and cassettes could also be utilized to store user-created data for the cartridge games Excitebike, Mach Rider, Wrecking Crew, and Castlequest. This feature was unavailable in the NES version due to it not being compatible with the Data Recorder.	Nintendo	
Famicom Controller	The original Famicom controller. Two controllers were permanently attached to the Famicom. The second player's controller included a built in microphone but lacked the "start" and "select" buttons.	Nintendo	
Family Converter	NES/Famicom cartridge adaptor.	Honey Bee	
Family Computer Disk System	A unit that read non standard disks with content downloaded from Nintendo Disk Writer vending machines at stores.	Nintendo	
Famicom Fitness System (FSS)	Bicycle Trainer	Bridgestone Cycle	
Famicom 4-Player Adaptor	Allows 4 players to play games at once. Not compatible with the NES Satellite or other NES 4-player adapters.	Hori	
Famicom Light Gun	A handgun-style light gun.	Nintendo	
Family Computer Network System	Used to connect to a Nintendo server which provided content such as jokes, news (mainly about Nintendo), game tips, weather reports for Japan and allowed a small number of games to be downloaded.	Nintendo	
Famicom RF Booster	RF connector	Hori	
Famicom S.D. System	Plugs into system's expansion slot for use with headphones.	Hori	
Family BASIC Keyboard	A Famicom keyboard only used in conjunction with the Family BASIC software.	Nintendo	
Family Robot	A small battery-powered robot.	Nintendo	
Family Trainer	A mat that allowed users to control games using their feet.	Bandai	
FAM-NET/FAM-NET II	Connected the Famicom to an online service.	Bridgestone	
TV-NET	Connected the Famicom to an online service. There are many option IC cards for connecting online services.	Microcore	
Piste	Connected the Famicom to an online Keirin service.	Microcore	
TV-NET printer	printer for TV-NET system	Microcore	
TV-NET RANK2	Connected the Famicom to an online service.	Microcore	
Gun Sight	Voice activated laser headset.	Konami	
Head Cleaning Card	A cleaning kit for the Nintendo FDS.	Nintendo	
Joystick-7	Arcade style joystick with Turbo control for the Famicom. Joystick-7 Mk II	Hori	
Joycard Sanusui SSS	Controller with turbofire and adapter for headphones.	Hudson Soft	
Multi-Box	Wireless RF transmitter for the original model Famicom. Connected to the right side controller nest.	Hori	
Party Room 21 Controller	A quiz show buzzer controller for use of up to six people.	Yonezawa	
Power Glove	Virtual hand controller.	PAX	
Spica T89	NES to Famicom cartridge adaptor.	Spica	
Super Controller	Joystick conversion cover for the Famicom Controller.	Bandai	
Toyo Stick	Famicom arcade style controller.	Toyo	
Turbo File and Turbo File II	External storage devices	ASCII Corporation	
Wide-Boy	An accessory only available to developers, gaming press, and retailers, meant to test and display Game Boy games on the television.	Intelligent Systems	
Wu Ho Cassette Adaptor	A NES to Famicom adaptor.	Wu Ho	

== Nintendo Entertainment System ==
Accessory Name	Description	Manufacturer	Ref.
Acclaim Remote Controller	The officially licensed wireless infrared remote controller for the NES.	Acclaim	
NES Advantage	Arcade style joystick for the NES. NES-026.	Nintendo	
Aladdin Deck Enhancer	Allows the NES to play Aladdin game cartridges.	Camerica	
Arkanoid Controller	Specific controller for the game Arkanoid.	Taito	
Battlestation II	Multi-system controller NES/SNES/Mega Drive.	Multicorp	
NES Cleaning Kit	A cleaning device that cleans the console and gamepak.	Nintendo	
NES Controller (Basic)	The original rectangle NES controller. NES-004.	Nintendo	
NES Controller 2 (Basic)	The SNES styled NES controller created for the NES-101. It's also nicknamed the Dog Bone controller. NES-039.	Nintendo	
Double Player	Wireless head-to-head system.	Acclaim	
Epyx 500XJ	Handheld Joystick for the NES.	Konix	
NES Four Score	Allows 4 players to play games at once. NES-034.	Nintendo	
Freedom Connection	Adaptor to convert any controller into a wireless one.	Camerica	
Freedom Pad	Infra-red wireless NES controller.	Camerica	
Freedom Stick	Arcade style joystick.	Camerica	
Game Genie	Cheat code adapter for NES cartridges. Normally only works on the NES-001 (front loading) control decks.	Codemasters	
Game Genie NES-101 Adaptor	A special adaptor that (when attached) allows the Game Genie to have compatibility with the NES-101. It was primarily given away for free to all Game Genie owners, but only if they made a mail order phone request for one. After mail orders were no longer accepted some of the leftover stock did appear for sale in limited quantities at lesser known convenience stores.	Galoob	
The Game Handler	A one-handed flight stick that controls by tilting.	IMN Control	
Game Key	NES cartridge adaptor.	Horeleg	
HES Unidaptor	Famicom and NES cartridge adaptor.	Home Entertainment Suppliers	
HES Unidaptor MKII	NES adaptor.	Home Entertainment Suppliers	
HFC (Hands Free Controller)	A hands free controller designed specifically for people with physical limitations and special needs. It was worn like a vest, uses puff and sipping motions on a straw for the A and B buttons, and a chin stick for directional movement. This product was offered exclusively through Nintendo's consumer service number and was not sold in stores.	Nintendo	
Homework First	Locking device with key to prevent play.	Safe Care Products Inc.	
Innovation Joypad	Turbo controller with cord on the left instead of top. "START" is labeled "CTART". Called "Innovation 8 Bit Controller" on box and "Innovation Joypad" on the actual controller.	Innovation Entertainment	
Jammer	NES Advantage clone.	Beeshu, Inc.	
Joycard Sanusui SSS	Controller with turbofire and adapter for headphones.	Hudson Soft	
LaserScope	Voice activated laser headset.	Konami	
Magic Key	NES cartridge adaptor.	Magic Key	
Mega	Programmable control pad with an LCD screen.	Bandai	
Modem	Modem allowing people to use Nintendo equipment to play the state lottery in the comfort of their living rooms. Use the expansion port.	Nintendo	
Miracle Piano	Game that teaches keyboarding with a real keyboard.	The Software Toolworks	
NES Max	A controller with a sliding control pad and rapid-fire buttons. NES-027.	Bullet-Proof Software	
Power Glove	Virtual hand controller.	Mattel	
Power Pad	NES exercise mat. NES-028. See also - Family Fun Fitness	Nintendo	
Pro Beam Light Gun	A Zapper Light Gun clone for NES.	Dominator	
Quickshot Arcade	QS-128n NES Advantage clone.	QuickShot	
Quickshot Aviator 2	Flight simulator style NES controller.	QuickShot	
Quickshot Trackball	Controller with two buttons and a trackball.	QuickShot	
Quickshot Wizmaster	Wireless controller.	Quickshot	
Quickshot Sighting Scope	QS-132. Scope that can be added to the NES Zapper.	QuickShot	
R.O.B.	A small battery-powered robot.	Nintendo	
Roll & Rocker	A tilting teeterboard directional controller in which a standing player tilts their weight in the four cardinal directions to control the game	LJN	
NES Satellite	Wireless four-player adapter for NES. NES-032.	Nintendo	
Speedboard	A piece of plastic that you put your controller in that "puts the speed at your fingers".	Pressman	
Speedking	Joystick with buttons on the side of the base and autofire setting.	Konix	
Super Chair	A chair controller; direction is determined by leaning in the chair and the A, B, Start, and Select buttons are on hand grips.	Sangkharom Trading Company	
Super Controller	Joystick conversion cover for the NES Controller (Basic)	Bandai	
Superstick	Infra-red wireless joystick.	Beeshu, Inc.	
Turbo Tech Controller	Controller for NES.	Unknown Manufacturer	
Turbo Touch 360	Touch sensor controller.	Triax	
Turbotronic	Arcade style joystick.	Camerica	
U-Force	Programmable "hands free" technology.	Broderbund	
Ultimate Superstick	Arcade style joystick.	Beeshu, Inc.	
Zapper Light Gun	Official NES light gun. NES-005. Came in both grey and orange color variations. See also - Video game light gun	Nintendo	
Zinger	Turbo fire joystick.	Beeshu, Inc.	
Zipper	Turbo fire control pad with small removable joystick that goes into its D-pad.	Beeshu, Inc.	
Zoomer	Flight simulator joystick.	Beeshu, Inc.	

== See also ==
- History of the Nintendo Entertainment System
- Nintendo Entertainment System hardware clone
- List of Super Nintendo Entertainment System accessories
