= List of accessories to video games by system =

== Controllers ==
Each company who has released a console has also released a controller for that particular console. The Wii console is capable of using a controller from both the Wii and the GameCube.

== Light guns ==
=== The 3DO Company ===
- Game Gun- 3DO Interactive Multiplayer

=== Atari ===
- XG-1-Atari 2600, Atari 8-bit computers

=== Other ===
- Intellivision
- CD-i

=== Nintendo ===
- NES Zapper-Nintendo Entertainment System
- Super Scope-Super Nintendo
- The Wii Zapper

=== Sega ===
- Dreamcast light guns-Dreamcast
- Menacer-Sega Genesis, Sega CD
- Light Phaser-Master System

== Music and rhythm peripherals ==
=== Nintendo Entertainment System ===
- Miracle Piano Teaching System keyboard

=== GameCube ===
- Donkey Konga bongo controllers
- Dance Dance Revolution controllers

=== Dreamcast ===
- Samba de Amigo maracas controller set
- Dance Dance Revolution controller

=== PlayStation ===
- Dance Dance Revolution controllers by Konami and third parties
- BeatMania controller by Konami

=== PlayStation 2 ===
- Dance Dance Revolution controllers by Konami and third parties
- Guitar Hero Gibson SG controllers - PlayStation 2
- ParaPara Paradise controller by Konami
- BeatMania controllers by Konami
- DrumMania controller by Konami and third parties
- GuitarFreaks controller by Konami
- Pop n' Music controller

=== Xbox ===
- Dance Dance Revolution controllers by Konami and third parties

== Miscellaneous peripherals ==
=== NES ===
- R.O.B. - Famicom version known simply as Robot, NES version named R.O.B., short for Robotic Operating Buddy

=== SNES ===
- Voice-Kun - A Super Famicom device packaged with the Koei games Angelique Voice Fantasy (アンジェリーク ヴォイスファンタジー) and EMIT (エミット) Vol.1 to 3.

=== GameCube ===
- Microphone - A microphone meant for use in such games as Mario Party 6.

=== Casio Loopy ===
- Magical Shop - A device which allows the user to take images from outside video sources, such as DVDs, VHS tapes, or camcorders, add text, and make them into stickers

=== Wii ===
- Nunchuk - An attachment for the Wii Remote. It is plugged into the Wii Remote's expansion port, where the two are connected via a cord.
- Classic Controller – A special controller attachment for the Wii Remote. While it is compatible with any Virtual Console game, it is heavily designed after the SNES controller and Sega Genesis controller. Many Wii games can also be played with the Classic Controller.
- Wii Sensor Bar – A bar that you point the Wii remote at to get the cursor on the television to work the Wii. The sensor bar is optional, as you can use the Classic Controller or the Classic Controller Pro. The bar comes with every console.
- Wii Wheel – An accessory that came packaged with every copy of Mario Kart Wii, though can also be purchased separately. It is also compatible with some driving games, such as Excitebots: Trick Racing and Sonic & Sega All-Stars Racing.
- Wii Speak – An accessory for the Wii console that allows the player to talk with others around the world without the need for a headset. The device can be placed near a television and anyone in the room will be able to talk. If you have this accessory, you are also able to download the Wii Speak Channel.
- Wii Vitality Sensor – A cancelled accessory for the Wii. Announced by Satoru Iwata at E3 in 2009, not much is known about the Vitality Sensor and how it would have been integrated into video games. It has been suggested by Iwata that it would be used to relax the player, telling them their heartbeat and about their body.

== Fishing rod peripherals ==
- Dreamcast
- Nintendo Labo (Toy-Con 01)

== Mouse peripherals ==
- Mega Drive
- SNES
- Casio Loopy
- Dreamcast

== See also ==
- List of Nintendo Entertainment System accessories
- List of Super Nintendo Entertainment System accessories
