= Namco Arcade Stick =

Arcade style controller for the original PlayStation

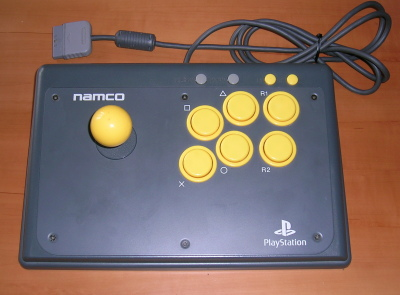
- Developer: Namco
- Manufacturer: Hori
- Type: Video game controller
- Released: JP: December 20, 1996; WW: 1997
- Platform: PlayStation, PlayStation 2

The Namco Arcade Stick (Note: Japanese: ナムコジョイスティック, Hepburn: Namuko Joisutikku; Namco Joystick) is an arcade controller released by Namco in 1996 for the PlayStation.

== Overview ==
The Namco Arcade Stick functions similar to a generic arcade stick found on an arcade game machine. Manufactured by the game peripheral manufacturer Hori Co., LTD, the arcade stick was made to be compatible with the original PlayStation control pad protocol for many games on the PlayStation and PlayStation 2. Namco PlayStation games such as Tekken, Soul Edge and Namco Museum Encore are labelled as compatible with the peripheral. Compatibility also extended to the PlayStation 3 upon use of a PS2 to PC USB adapter. Functionality was expanded on the PlayStation 3 under the 2.0 firmware update. The Namco Arcade Stick is fully compatible with PlayStation 3 fighting games such as Ultimate Marvel vs. Capcom 3, Tekken Tag Tournament 2, and Super Street Fighter IV.
