= List of Super Nintendo Entertainment System accessories =

This is a list of accessories for the Super Nintendo Entertainment System (Super NES), including first- and third-party hardware released during the 1990s.

== First-party accessories ==
- Cleaning Kit – accessory for cleaning the console and game paks
- Nintendo Power – rewritable flash cartridge (Japan)
- Satellaview – satellite peripheral for receiving downloadable software and newsletters (Japan)
- Score Master – desktop joystick with auto-fire (Europe)
- Super Game Boy – adapter for playing Game Boy cartridges on the Super NES
- Super NES Controller – standard controller with D-pad, four right side action buttons (A, B, X and Y), two center action buttons (Start and Select), and two shoulder buttons (L and R)
- Super NES Mouse – two-button mouse for compatible games
- Super Scope – wireless light gun
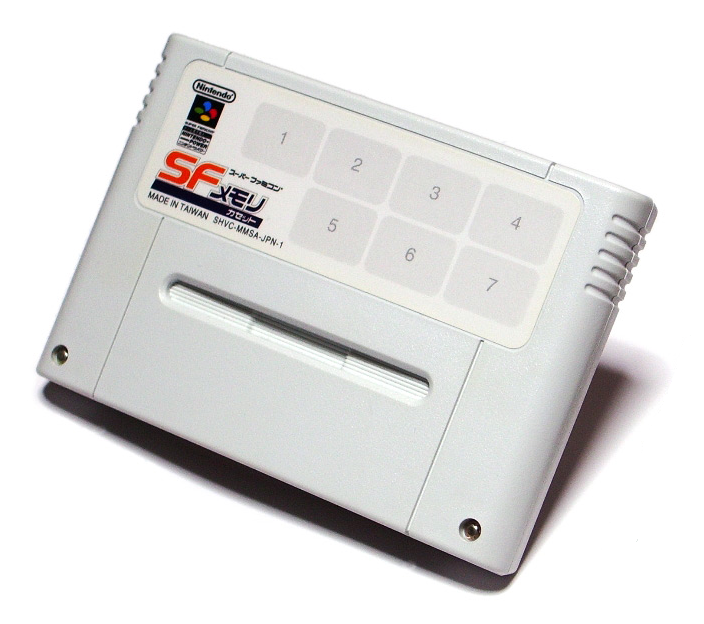
Nintendo Power cartridge

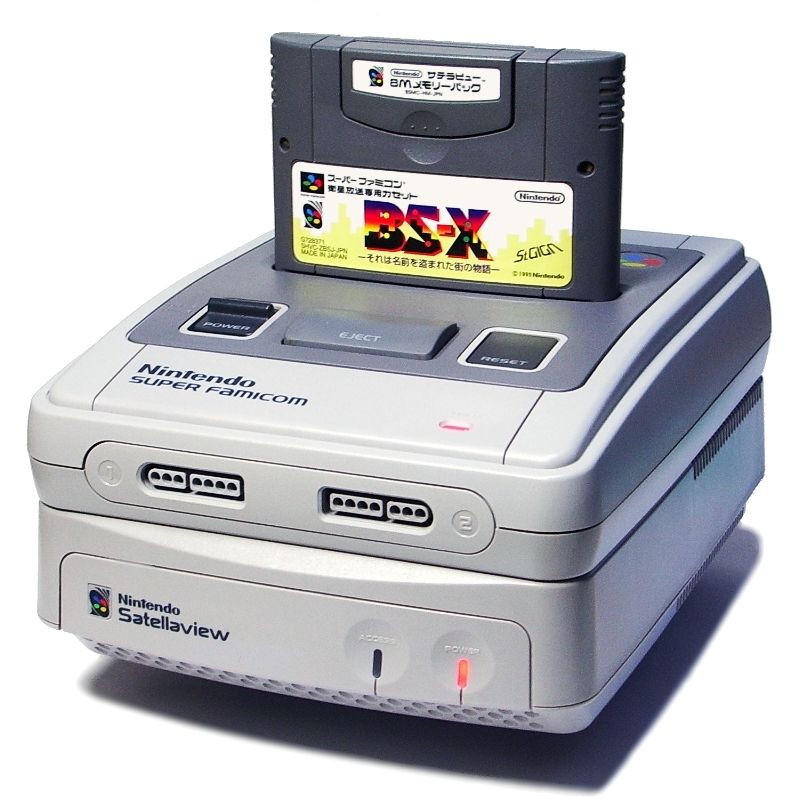
Satellaview attached to Super Famicom console

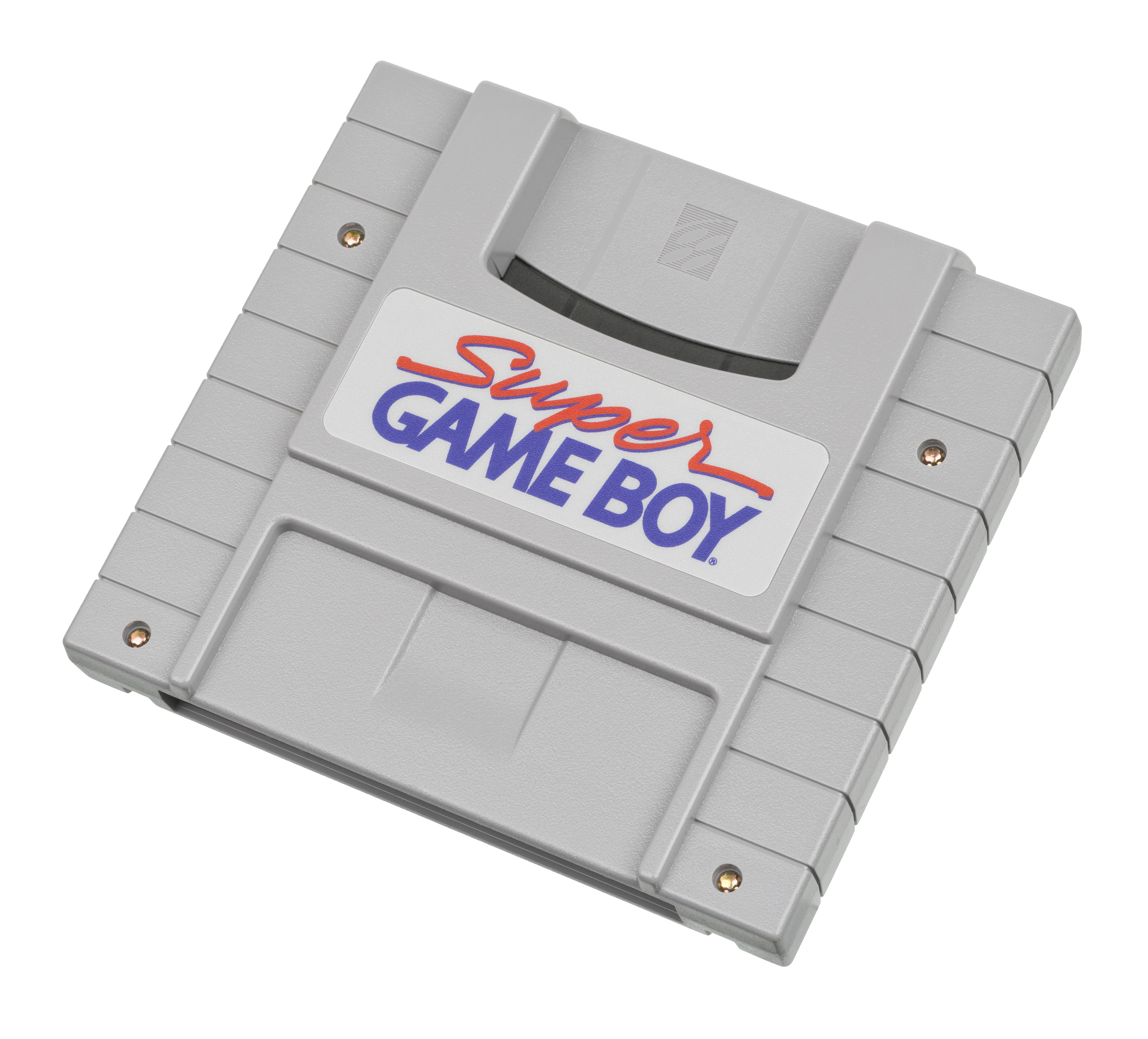
Super Game Boy (North America, original)

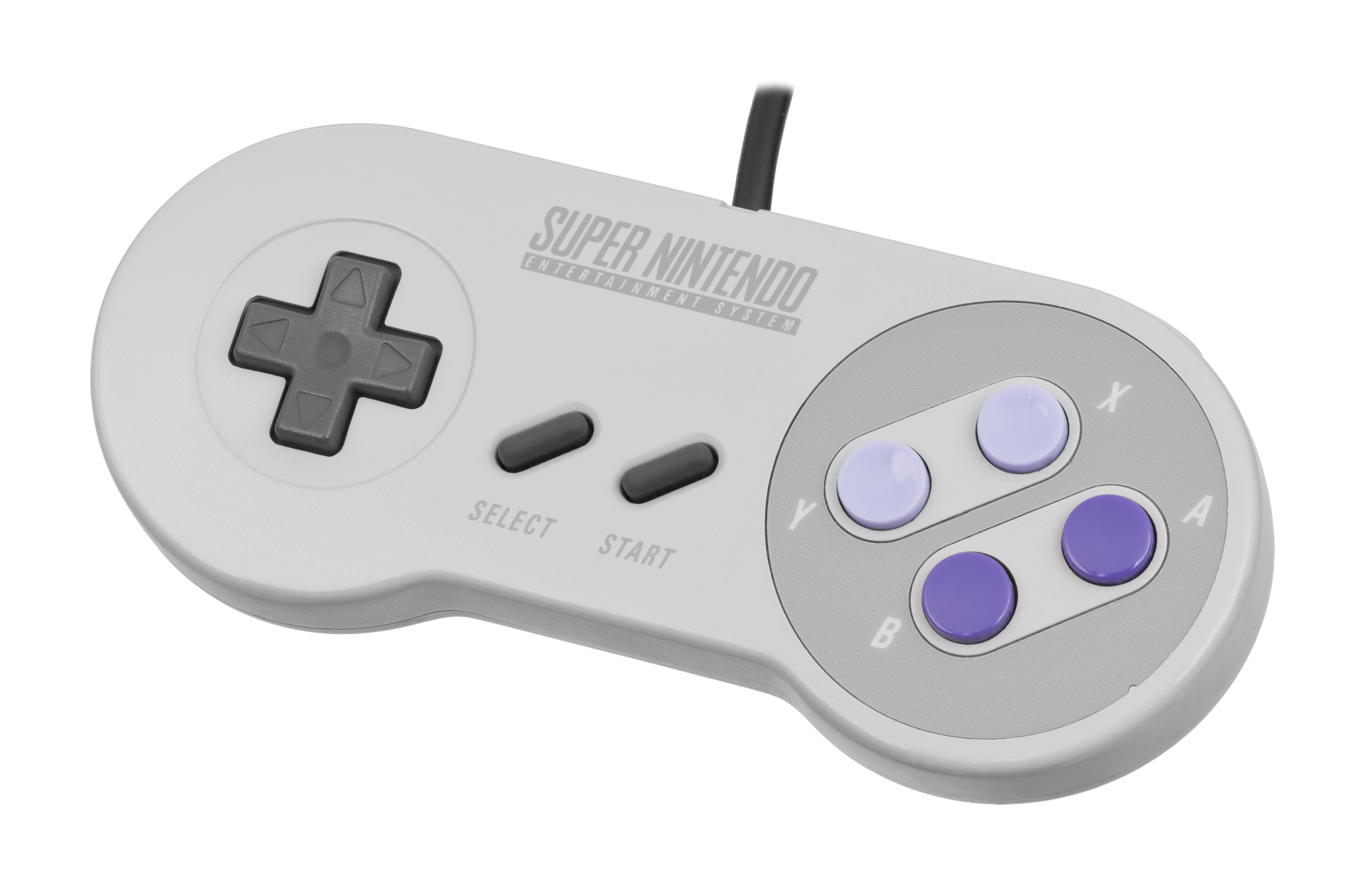
Super NES controller (North America)

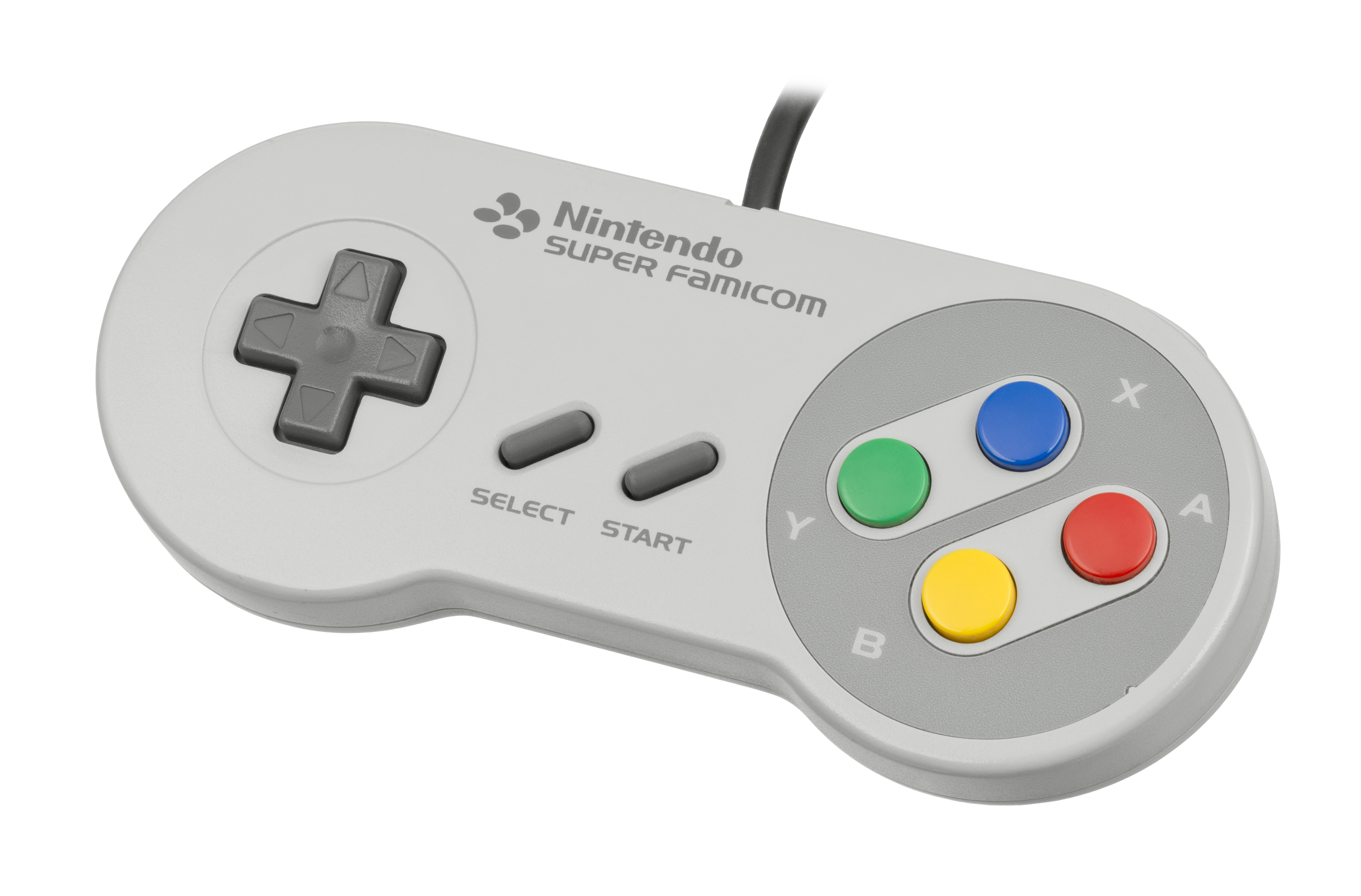
Super Famicom controller (Japan)

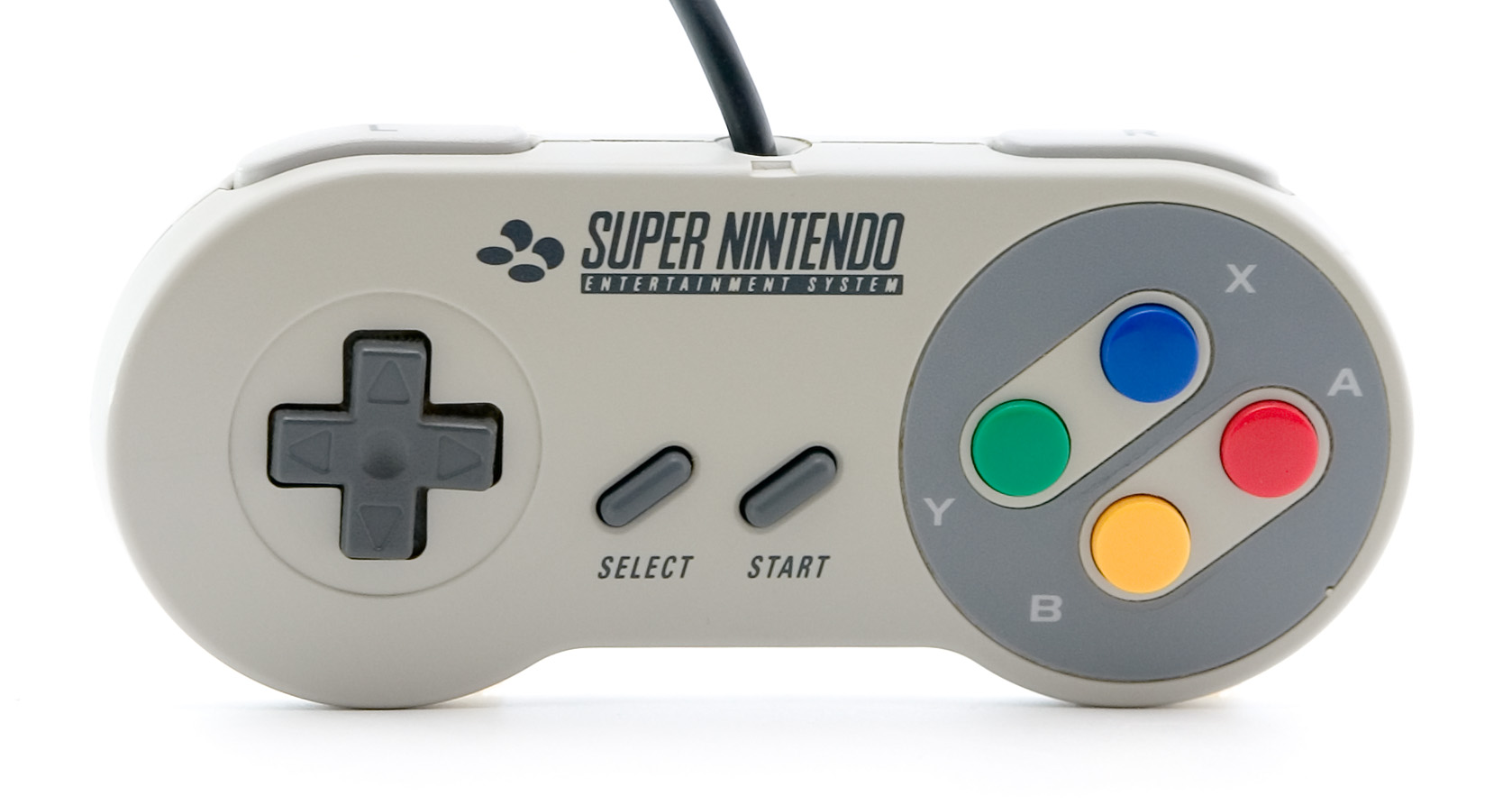
Super NES controller (PAL)

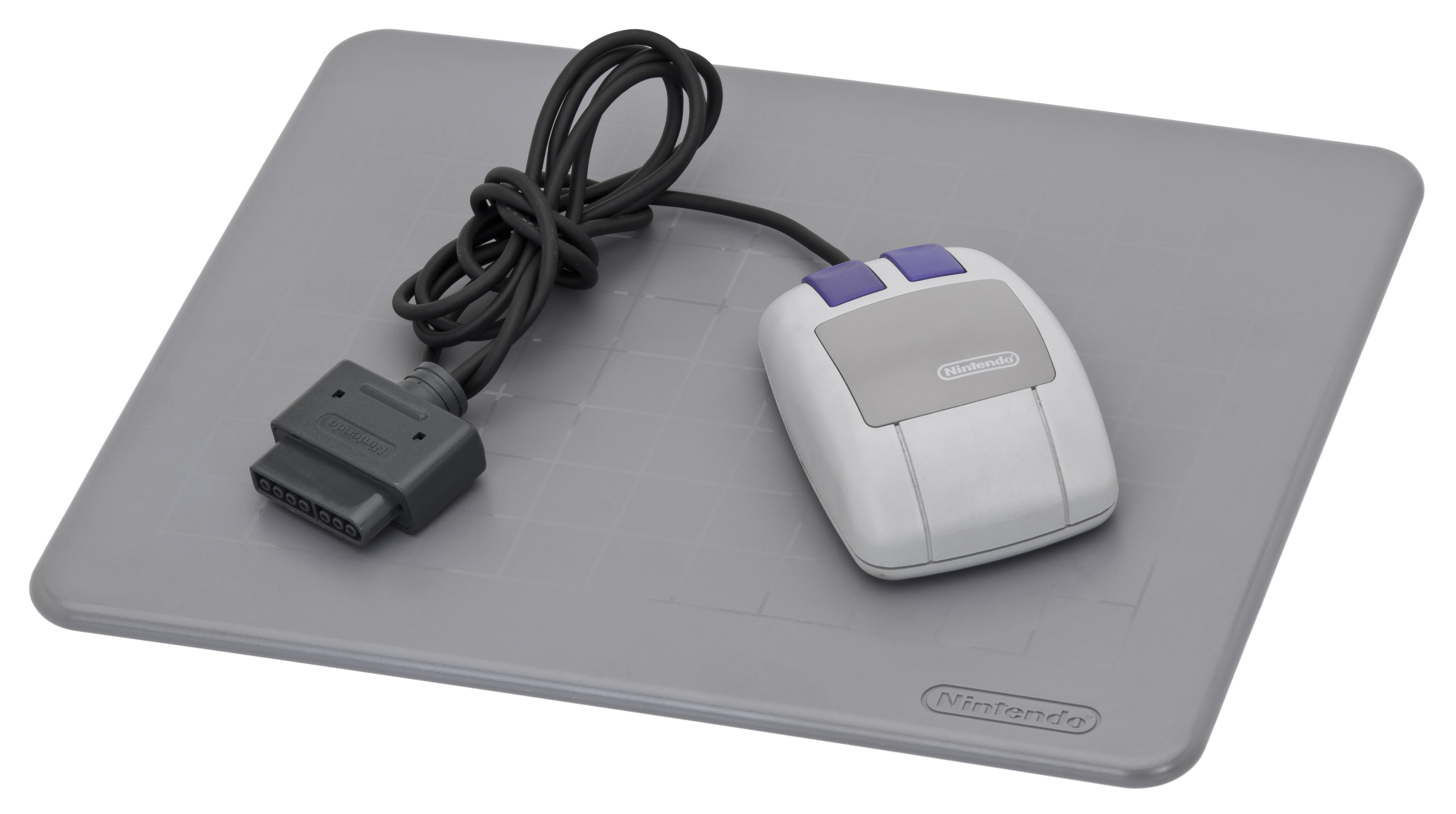
Super NES Mouse and pad

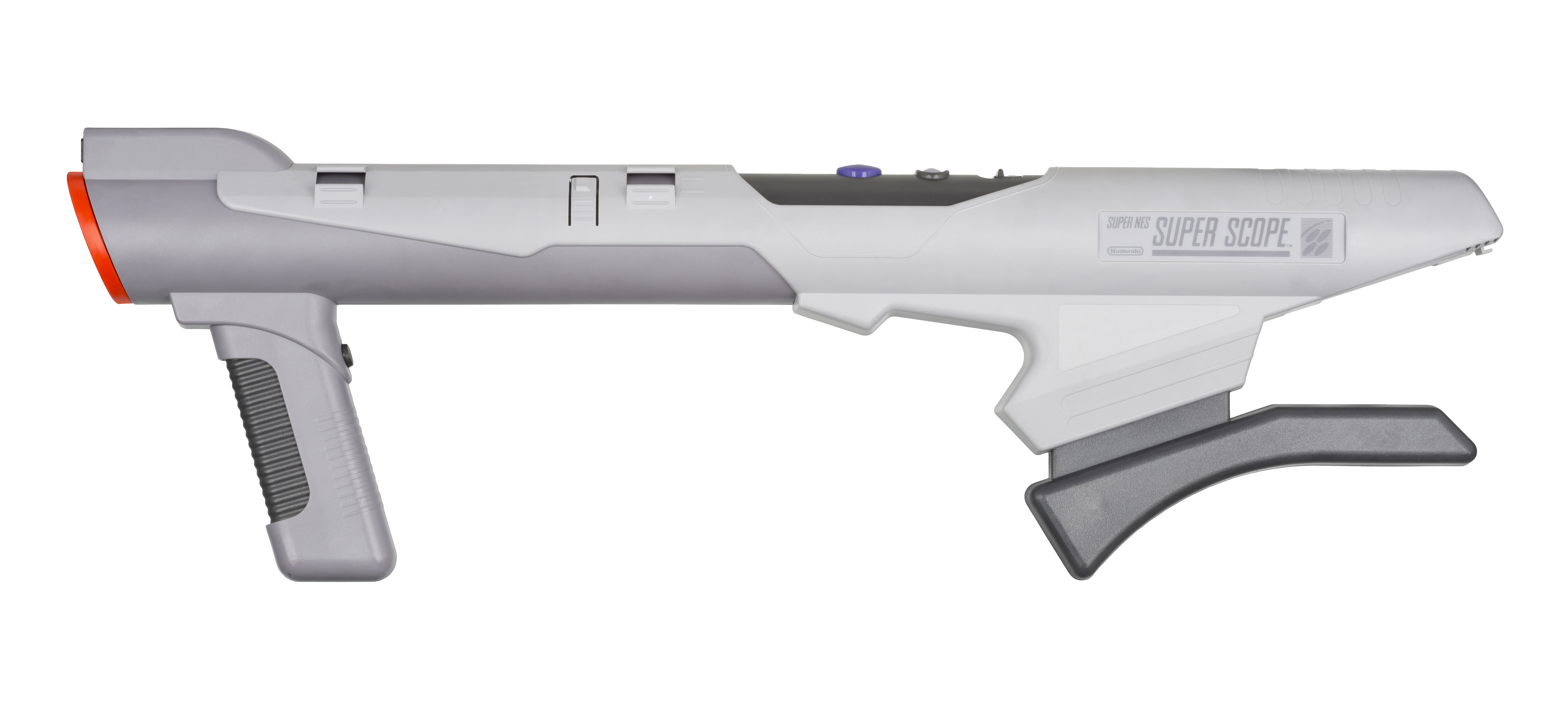
Super Scope

== Third-party accessories ==
=== Controllers ===
==== Directional controllers ====
- Advanced Control Pad – controller with auto-fire (Mad Catz)
- Angler – detachable stick attachment for the directional pad (Beeshu)
- asciiGrip – one-handed controller (ASCII)
- asciiPad – controller with auto-fire and slow-motion functions (ASCII)
- Capcom Pad Soldier – pistol-grip controller with six face buttons (Capcom)
- Competition Pro (controller) – controller with auto-fire and slow-motion (Competition Pro)
- Conqueror 2 – programmable joystick with auto-fire (QuickShot)
- Cyberpad – programmable controller with auto-fire and slow-motion (Suncom)
- Dual Turbo – set of two wireless controllers with auto-fire (Acclaim)
- Energiser – programmable controller with auto-fire and slow-motion (Wild Things)
- Fighter Stick SN – desktop joystick with auto-fire and slow-motion (ASCII)
- Game Commander – officially licensed controller (Imagineer) / Super Hori Commander (Hori)
- Game Commander II – licensed controller with expanded functions (Imagineer)
- Gamepad 6 – six-button controller with auto-fire (Performance)
- Gamemaster – controller with one programmable button (Triton)
- High Frequency Control Pad – standard controller variant (High Frequency)
- Invader 2 – controller with auto-fire (QuickShot)
- Jet Fighter – novelty controller shaped like a jet, with auto-fire (Beeshu)
- JS-306 Power Pad Tilt – controller with tilt input, auto-fire, and slow-motion (Champ)
- Multisystem 6 – controller compatible with both Super NES and Sega Genesis (Competition Pro)
- NTT Data Pad – controller with integrated numeric keypad for modem functions (NTT)
- Pro Control 6 – programmable controller with auto-fire and slow-motion; compatible with Super NES and Genesis (Naki)
- Pro Fighter 6 – programmable desktop joystick with auto-fire and slow-motion (Naki)
- Pro Player – desktop joystick with auto-fire and slow-motion (Naki)
- Rhinogear – controller with auto-fire and slow-motion (ASCII)
- SF-3 – low-profile controller with auto-fire (Honey Bee)
- SN Programpad – controller with macro programming and LCD (InterAct)
- SN Propad – controller with auto-fire and slow-motion (InterAct)
- SN Propad 2 / SN Propad 6 – revised controllers with additional button layouts (InterAct)
- SN-6 – standard controller clone (Gamester)
- Specialized Fighter Pad – controller with auto-fire; shoulder buttons mapped to face buttons (ASCII)
- Speedpad – controller with configurable shoulder-button functions (Logic 3)
- Super Advantage – arcade-style joystick with auto-fire (ASCII)
- Super Control Pad – standard controller clone with configuration switch
- Super Joy Card – controller with auto-fire (Hudson Soft)
- Supercon – alternative-shape controller (QuickShot)
- Superpad – standard controller clone (InterAct/Performance)
- Super UFO – controller with additional face buttons (Fire)
- TopFighter – programmable joystick with LCD and auto-fire (QJ)
- Turbo Touch 360 – controller using pressure-sensitive disc instead of a D-pad (Triax)
- V356 – controller with configuration switch (Recoton)

(Various “non-name” clone controllers, wireless variants, and unbranded pads are omitted or grouped unless distinct features are documented.)

==== Other controllers ====
- Batter Up – baseball-bat controller (Sports Sciences Inc.)
- Barcode Battler – handheld barcode-reading device (Epoch)
- Exertainment Bike – exercise bike accessory (Life Fitness)
- Konami Justifier – light gun (Konami)
- Lasabirdie – golf-club controller for Lasabirdie – Get in the Hole (Ricoh)
- M.A.C.S. M16 – M16 rifle modified to act as a light gun developed for military training (United States Army)
- Miracle Piano Teaching System – keyboard teaching accessory (The Software Toolworks)
- Nordic Quest – ski exercise peripheral (NordicTrack)
- NTT Data Pad – controller with numeric keypad for use with the Super Famicom Modem
- Pachinko Controller – dial-type controller for pachinko titles (Sunsoft)
- SNES Multitap – adapter allowing up to four players (Hudson Soft)
- TeeV Golf – golf-club controller for compatible golf titles (Sports Sciences Inc.)
- Twin Tap – two-button input device for quiz software (Partyroom21)
- XBAND Keyboard – keyboard for use with XBAND (Catapult)

=== Cheat devices ===
- Action Replay – cheat and debugging device (Datel)
- Game Genie – cheat device (Codemasters)
- Game Wizard – cheat device
- X-Terminator – cheat device

=== Other devices ===
- Data Packs – small rewritable cartridges used with certain game cartridges
- Multi Player Adaptors / Multitaps – adapters for multiple controllers (various manufacturers)
- NTT Data Communication Modem NDM24 – modem for online horse-betting services in Japan.
- Nuoptix 3D Glasses – glasses based on the Pulfrich effect, packaged with Jim Power: The Lost Dimension in 3-D (Loriciel)
- Power Plug – inline auto-fire adapter (Tyco)
- StuntMaster – head-mounted display with LCD screen and motion sensor (VictorMaxx/Future Vision Technologies)
- SuFami Turbo – adapter for miniature cartridges (Bandai)
- Super 8 / Tri-Star – adapter for playing NES games.
- Turbo File Adapter / Turbo File Twin – external storage devices (ASCII)
- Voicer-kun – infrared transmitter/receiver for controlling CD players (Koei)
- XBAND Modem – modem for online multiplayer gaming (Catapult)

== See also ==
- List of Nintendo Entertainment System accessories
- List of Super NES enhancement chips
- Nintendo 64 accessories
