= Said Legue =

Swedish actor

William Legue
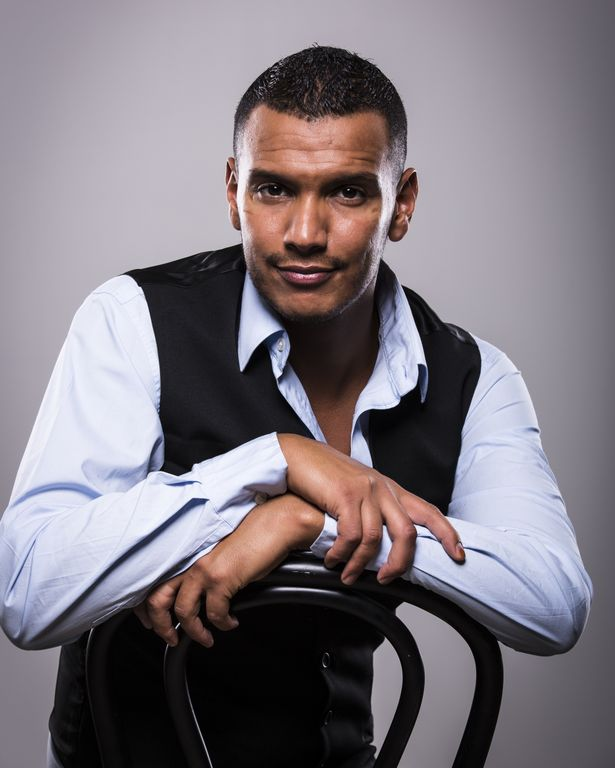
- Said William Legue
- Born: 4 May 1982 (age 44); Gothenburg, Sweden
- Occupations: Actor and Script writer
- Years active: 2003–present
- Website: Official website: williamlegue.com Management: IMA International Management Agency / IMA Content

Said William Legue (born 4 May 1982) is a Swedish actor and script writer of Moroccan ancestry.

A former football player, Legue's career in acting started after being injured. Since his first appearance on screen in 2003, he has undertaken roles due to his mixed background and his multilingual abilities (Arabic, French, Swedish and English). Legue has featured in more than 14 movies and 3 larger theatre sets. His stories have influenced screenwriters as well as directors and he is credited with working as a script consultant for the TV series Kniven i hjärtat as well as for the SVT production Ettor och Nollor, where Legue had a leading roles as Azad.

As well as acting, Legue is active with FC Ibra, a futsal indoor soccer team.

== Filmography ==
(All movies in Swedish)

Year	Film	Role
2006	Ditt Land Mitt Land	Mohamed
2006	Moment of Clarity	English seller
2008	Morgan Pålsson - världsreporter	AL Benan
2009	Happ	Martin
2011	Happy End	Jamal
2012	Nobels testamente	Police
2012	Hamilton – Men inte om det gäller din dotter	Suleiman Al-Obeid
2014	Malik	Samir
2014	Vaskduellen	President Barack Obama
2014	Opus of an Angel	Amano
2012	Theatre of Hate	

== TV ==
(All performances in Swedish)

Year	TV	Role
2004	Kniven i hjärtat	Chico
2004	Häktet	Jail superintendent
2005	En fråga om liv eller död	Zino
2008	Gisslan	Karim
2009	Johan Falk	Dani
2011	Bron	Navid
2014	Ettor och Nollor	Azad

== Theatre ==
(All performances in Swedish)

Year	Production	Location	Role
2006	Rädslan äter själen	Teater Galease	Zino
2007	The good man of Szechwan	Gothenburg City Theater	Ma Fun
2008	Halvvägs till himlen	Folkteatern Gothenburg	Ibbe
