= Turbotronic =

Video game joystick

Turbotronic is a joystick marketed by Camerica in the late 1980s. The joystick has two connectors: One with seven pins for the Nintendo Entertainment System, and one with nine pins for several Atari and Commodore home computers and game consoles, as well as the Master System.

The Turbotronic closely resembles the NES Advantage, a joystick released by Nintendo of America in 1987. In 1988, Camerica released Freedom Stick, a Wireless, consumer IR version of Turbotronic exclusively for the Nintendo Entertainment System (NES). Nintendo brought legal action against Camerica because of the products' similarity to the NES Advantage.

Camerica later redesigned Freedom Stick with an unorthodox triangular base intended for both right- and left-handed players, and called the product Supersonic the Joystick. The bottom of the joystick's base is fitted with suction cups to stabilize it on a tabletop.

Freedom Stick and Supersonic the Joystick were among the first game controllers to communicate via infrared beam. They were contemporaneous with Broderbund's U-Force, a game controller that made innovative use of consumer IR technology.

== See also ==
- List of Nintendo Entertainment System accessories
- Power Glove
