= SuFami Turbo =

Video game peripheral

- Manufacturer: Bandai
- Type: Video game console peripheral
- Generation: Fourth generation
- Lifespan: JP: 1996

The SuFami Turbo (スーファミターボ) is a peripheral released in 1996 by Bandai for the Nintendo Super Famicom system.

== Overview ==
This device is designed to sit on top of the Super Famicom, and features two cartridge slots. The premise is that games could be produced at a much lower cost and development time, not having to rely on Nintendo for cartridge production. This device was officially approved by Nintendo under the provision that Bandai handle all the hardware manufacturing itself.

The two cartridge slots are designed to share data between the games. The cartridge placed in slot 1 is the game that will be played, while the cartridge in slot 2 supplies additional data for use in the main game. Of the thirteen games released, nine of them can link up, within each game series.

Games that are linkable are identified by a yellow diagram showing a SuFami Turbo with either 1 or 2 cartridges in the lower left corner of the game box. If the picture has 1 cart plugged into the SuFami Turbo, it is not linkable. If it has 2 carts plugged into the SuFami Turbo then it is linkable with the games named on the box.

The games also have a shared currency called TurboCoins.

The SuFami Turbo was released as a standalone unit, or with a pack in game.

== Games ==
Games debuted for ¥3,980, with many offering the ability to link for added playability. Each of the 13 released games' boxes has a little picture in the lower left corner indicating whether linking is possible. The included pamphlet features Tetris 2 + Bombliss which was never released for the system, but as a standalone Super Famicom game.

SuFami Turbo game library
Title	Release date	Linkability	Pack-in
Poi Poi Ninja World	June 28, 1996	Itself	Yes
SD Gundam Generations: Ichinen Sensōki (part 1)	July 26, 1996	All	Yes
SD Gundam Generations: Gryps Senki (part 2)	July 26, 1996	All	No
SD Gundam Generations: Axis Senki (part 3)	August 23, 1996	All	No
SD Gundam Generations: Babylonia Kenkoku Senki (part 4)	August 23, 1996	All	No
SD Gundam Generations: Zanscare Senki (part 5)	September 27, 1996	All	No
SD Gundam Generations: Colony Kakutouki (part 6)	September 27, 1996	All	No
SD Ultra Battle: Ultraman Densetsu (Ultraman Legend)	June 28, 1996	Itself, Seven Legend	Yes
SD Ultra Battle: Seven Densetsu (Seven Legend)	June 28, 1996	Itself, Ultraman Legend	No
Crayon Shin-chan: Nagagutsu Dobon	September 27, 1996	None	No
GeGeGe No Kitarō: Yōkai Donjara	July 19, 1996	None	Yes
Bishoujo Senshi Sailor Moon Sailor Stars: Fuwafuwa Panic 2 (Pretty Soldier Sailor Moon Sailor Stars: Fluffy Fluffy Panic 2)	September 27, 1996	None	Yes
Gekisou Sentai Carranger: Zenkai! Racer Senshi	August 23, 1996	None	No

=== SD Gundam Generations ===
SD Gundam Generations is a series of 6 games, each containing a certain amount of unique Gundam fighters. With the main Gundam Generations game in slot 1, the player can use Gundam fighters from the cartridge in slot 2.

=== SD Ultra Battle ===
SD Ultra Battle is a beat 'em up game based on the Ultraman series which allows the player to use the characters from whichever cart was in slot 2, in the main game in slot 1. It links with other copies of the same game (Battle 1 links with Battle 1), allowing both players to use the same character and saved data, or with the opposing game using characters from both games. The first game is based on Ultraman, and the second is based on Ultra Seven.

=== Poi Poi Ninja ===
Poi Poi Ninja only links with other copies of Poi Poi Ninja, to share save data or character data for vs. battles.

== See also ==
- List of Super Nintendo Entertainment System accessories
- Aladdin Deck Enhancer
- Datach - a similar mini-cartridge adaptor, with additional barcode reader, but with only one cartridge slot (from Bandai, for Famicom)
