= X-Arcade =

Brand of video game controllers

X-Arcade is a brand of arcade-style video game controllers and arcade cabinets manufactured by XGaming, Inc. The original X-Arcade controller, a two-player model was released for PC and Linux in 2001. Adapters for video game consoles such as the PlayStation, Xbox 360, Xbox, Wii, GameCube, and Dreamcast, for USB interfaces were subsequently released. The game controls recreate the controls of traditional arcade games.

X-Arcade manufactures USB arcade controllers compatible with Windows, Mac, Linux, PlayStation 2, and Xbox 360, as well as a variety of other controller adapters. X-Arcade controllers require no drivers to function. X-Arcade produces stand-up arcade machines and cabinets, which use X-Arcade branding by default. Custom artwork and marquees can be applied. The machines are compatible with emulators such as MAME and can run arcade ROMs when connected to a suitable computer and operating system. Complete machines typically include a cabinet, monitor, and X-Arcade joystick pre-assembled. Some systems include pre-installed games, depending on the configuration.

Some included titles may consist of classic arcade games such as Space Invaders, Galaxian, Scramble, Defender, Zaxxon, Pac-Man, Kung-Fu Master, Mortal Kombat II, Mortal Kombat 3, Street Fighter, Ninja Gaiden, Marble Madness, and Missile Command. Additional games can be added by the user, depending on emulator and ROM compatibility.
