= Crayon Shin-Chan: Ora to Poi Poi =

1993 video game

- Family Computer cover art
- Developer: TOSE
- Publisher: Bandai
- Platforms: Family Computer; Datach Joint ROM System
- Release: JP: August 27, 1993
- Genres: Action; Puzzle
- Modes: Single-player; Multiplayer

Crayon Shin-Chan: Ora to Poi Poi (クレヨンしんちゃん オラとポイポイ, Kureyon Shinchan Ora to Poi Poi; Crayon Shin-chan: I Jauntily Jauntily) is a puzzle video game for the Family Computer based on the series Crayon Shin-chan. It was developed by TOSE and published by Bandai on August 27, 1993, in Japan only. A version of the game was simultaneously released for the Datach Joint ROM System add-on but lacked any features that utilized its barcode card reading capabilities.

== Plot ==
Each of the game's level stages feature different situations with Shinnosuke involving one of the supporting characters from the series. These situations must be resolved by playing a card game.

== Gameplay ==
Gameplay

The game is a simple card game with a Tetris element. The layout is similar to a Tennis court with both players on either sides defending their goal, while stacks of cards are positioned in the center. Players must move Shin up and down sliding cards, in twos, to the center pile matching up symbols and push each stack back to the opponent's side in an attempt to over take their goal.

== Reception ==
Famitsu gave the game a combined score of 20 out of 40.
