= Battle Rush: Build Up Robot Tournament =

1993 video game

- Cover art
- Developer: TOSE
- Publisher: B-AI
- Platform: Datach Joint ROM System
- Release: JP: November 13, 1993
- Genre: Action
- Mode: Single-player

Battle Rush: Build Up Robot Tournament (バトルラッシュ BUILD UP ROBOT TOURNAMENT) is a Japan-exclusive video game for the Datach Joint ROM System add-on for the Family Computer. The game was one of six that required Bandai's Datach (データック) system in order to operate.

== Gameplay ==
Players build their own combat robots to use in a fighting tournament. These robots are built in factories that assign the robot a name in addition to installing its head, body, shoulder, and feet. The player has a pre-game lobby to get ready for the robot combat action. All matches have rounds of 60 seconds (unlike the 99-second round of most modern fighting video games). Both robots have a separate gauge for energy and damage. Standard punches and kicks can be thrown in addition to special moves (which look like ammunition).

== Reception ==
On release, Famicom Tsūshin scored the game a 16 out of 40.
