= J. League Super Top Players =

1994 video game

J.League Super Top Players
- Cover art
- Developer: Tose
- Publisher: Bandai
- Platform: Family Computer
- Release: JP: April 22, 1994
- Genre: Traditional soccer simulator
- Mode: Single-player or multiplayer

J.League Super Top Players (Jリーグスーパートッププレイヤーズ) is a soccer game for the Family Computer, utilizing the Datach Joint ROM System, which was the barcode reader accessory sold separately.

== Gameplay ==
=== General gameplay ===
The game itself is interesting, with ten teams to choose from, and multiple game modes including an actual tournament or penalty kick practicing.

For the PK Battle modes, each player must select a different team. He must then scan a player card (not a team card), and then that player will have a chance to kick a penalty kick (if it is his turn). For all other modes, the player must scan a team card and that will be the team that he will play as for the game(s). The main mode of play is the J.LEAGUE mode, of course. It is set up in a season/tournament setting, with 18 games per team. There are ten teams total in this version of J.League, and they are randomly sorted to play against a different team each day. The games are split into two periods with three minutes (3:00) apiece. Prior to starting a game, the player can choose the formation of his eleven active players, from one of three layouts that he can see on the small screen (4-4-2, 4-3-3, or 3-5-2).

=== Teams ===
- Gamba Osaka (ガンバ大阪)
- JEF United Ichihara (ジェフ市原)
- Kashima Antlers (鹿島アントラーズ)
- Nagoya Grampus (名古屋グランパス)
- Sanfrecce Hiroshima (サンフレッチェ広島)
- Shimizu S-Pulse (清水エスパルス)
- Urawa Red Diamonds (浦和レッズ)
- Verdy Kawasaki (ベルディ川崎)
- Yokohama Flügels (横浜フリューゲルス)
- Yokohama Marinos (横浜マリノス)
