= U-Force =

Game controller for the Nintendo Entertainment System

- Developer: Broderbund
- Manufacturer: Broderbund
- Released: 1989
- Platform: Nintendo Entertainment System

The U-Force is a game controller made by Broderbund for the Nintendo Entertainment System. It employs a pair of perpendicular consumer IR sensor panels to translate the user's hand movements into controller signals.

== Reception ==
The U-Force was ranked the eighth worst video game controller by IGN editor Craig Harris. MSN listed it as one of the top 10 worst game peripherals, writing "Second only to the Sega Activator in terms of all-out crappiness, the U-Force also used infrared sensors to create a truly nightmarish controller...'Don't Touch' said the adverts for the device, in a rare example of an advertising campaign that got it spot on."

== See also ==
- List of Nintendo Entertainment System accessories
  - Power Glove
  - Turbotronic
