= Homework First =

Parental lock for the Nintendo Entertainment System

- Developer: SafeCare Products, Inc. Master Lock
- Type: Combination lock
- Released: 1990
- Platform: Nintendo Entertainment System

The Homework First is a combination lock parental control device for the Nintendo Entertainment System made by SafeCare Products, Inc. of Dundee, Illinois and Master Lock. The lock features a "Self-Setting" combination that attaches to the open bay of a front-loading NES-001 system via a screw hole below the cartridge slot which enables the lock to grab the console like a vise to prevent both the insertion of cartridges and the removal of the device. Around 25,000 units were claimed to have been sold.

== Reception ==
ACE magazine panned the device on a conceptual level during their 1989 CES coverage.

Jeuxvideo.com cited the device as one of the first video game parental controls.

== See also ==
- 10NES (lockout chip preventing games not authorized by Nintendo from running)
