= Arcade controller =

Video game input device

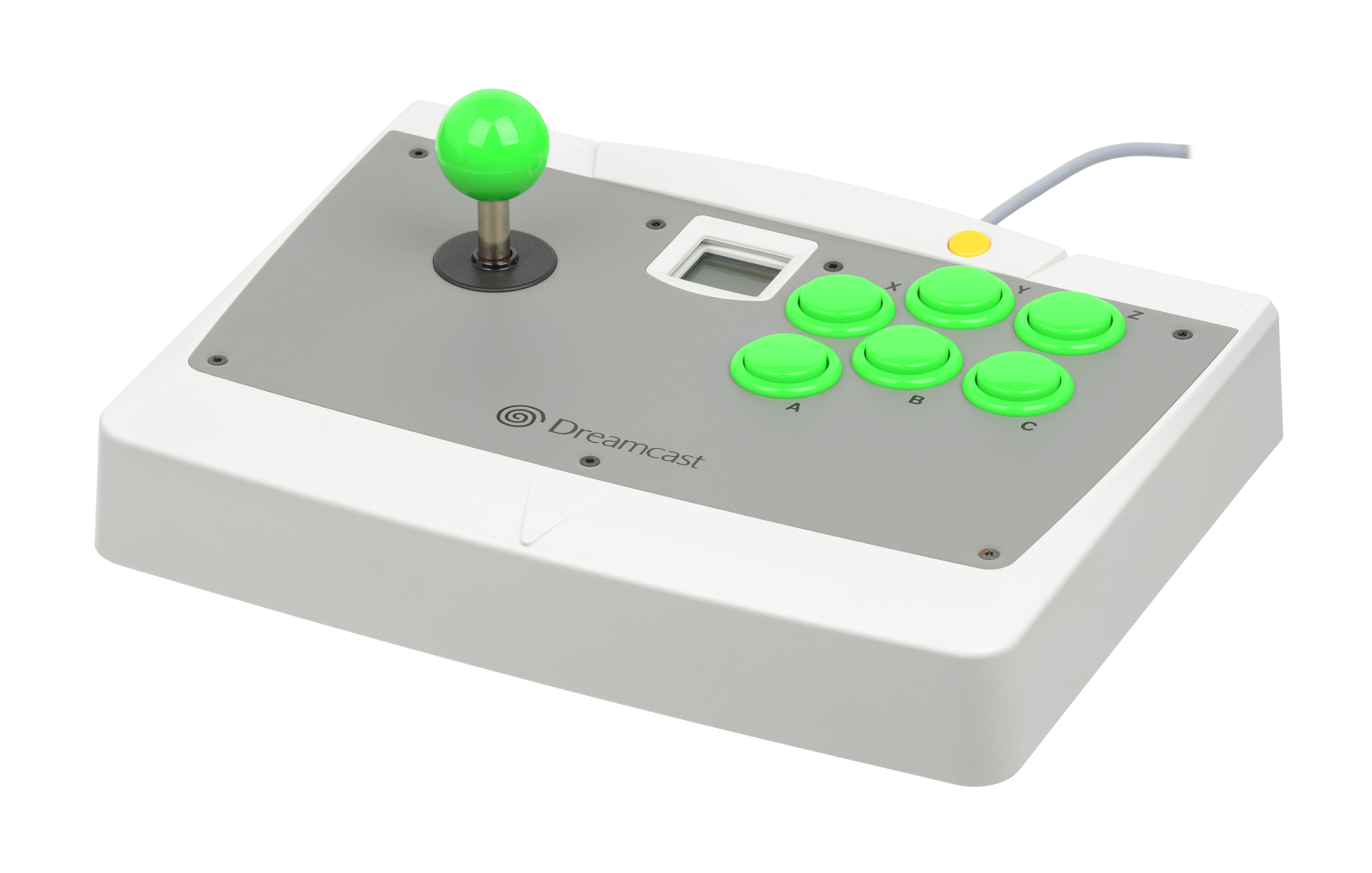
An official controller for the Sega Dreamcast, modeled after arcade cabinet controls

An arcade controller (commonly referred to as an arcade stick or fight stick) is a collective set of input devices designed primarily for use in an arcade cabinet. A typical control set consists of a joystick and a number of push-buttons. Less common setups include devices such as trackballs or steering wheels. These devices are generally produced under the assumption that they will be used in commercial settings, such as in video arcades, where they may be heavily or roughly used. Durability is one of the distinguishing characteristics of "authentic" arcade parts when compared with numerous, low-cost arcade imitations designed for private use in the home.

== Joystick design ==
A typical joystick is a digital input device that registers movement according to the range of motion that it is designed to detect. Most modern joysticks have an 8-way configuration, allowing for movement in the cardinal directions and the diagonals. There also exist common "analog" sticks that in actuality are implemented as 49-way digital, with incremental degrees of movement in each direction. Many vintage arcade games use a 4-way or even 2-way stick rather than an 8-way stick, which can cause compatibility problems that may be mitigated by the use of an appropriate restrictor gate.

=== Joystick types ===
The four most common arcade joystick types are the ball top, bat top, 4 button layout, and a keyboard WASD type. In Korea, the bat top is by far the most common with the ball top style being most common in Japan. If the ball and bat top is uncomfortable, The 4 button layout and keyboard WASD are always available. This kind of format is most common in Hitbox arcade sticks. The type of joystick is a matter of personal preference and comfort, as different types of grips, and angles, and button types are vastly available.

=== Restrictor gates ===
A restrictor gate limits the joystick's range of motion. The most common reason to use a gate in an actual arcade setting is the retrofitting of an older machine that is not compatible with a new 8-way stick. A classic example of this is Pac-Man. The game was originally designed for a 4-way stick, and is programmed to respond only when a new input occurs. If the user is holding the stick in the down position, then suddenly makes a motion to move to the right, what often happens is that the stick first moves into the down-right diagonal, which the game does not recognize as new input since down is still being held. However, right is also now considered held, and when the user completes the motion to move right, it is also not a new input, and Pac-Man will still be moving down.

In cases such as the above, a typical solution is to use a square (diamond) or clover-shaped restrictor, which prevents the stick from entering the diagonals.

For home arcade controllers, the most common restrictor gate used in modding is the octagonal gate. This is because most mid-grade and higher controllers use Japanese-style sticks with a traditional square gate—which is chosen because it has an equal area of throw for each direction. However, because of the sharp corners, the stick can get stuck in the diagonals if the player is unaccustomed to using a square gate. The octagonal gate allows for continuous motion along the edges using inertia, more similar to the circular motion of American sticks. In a fighting game many 360 degree motion special moves are usually executed easier with an octagonal gate while charge characters and characters which utilize many directional based moves will benefit more from a stick with a square gate.

== Regional style ==
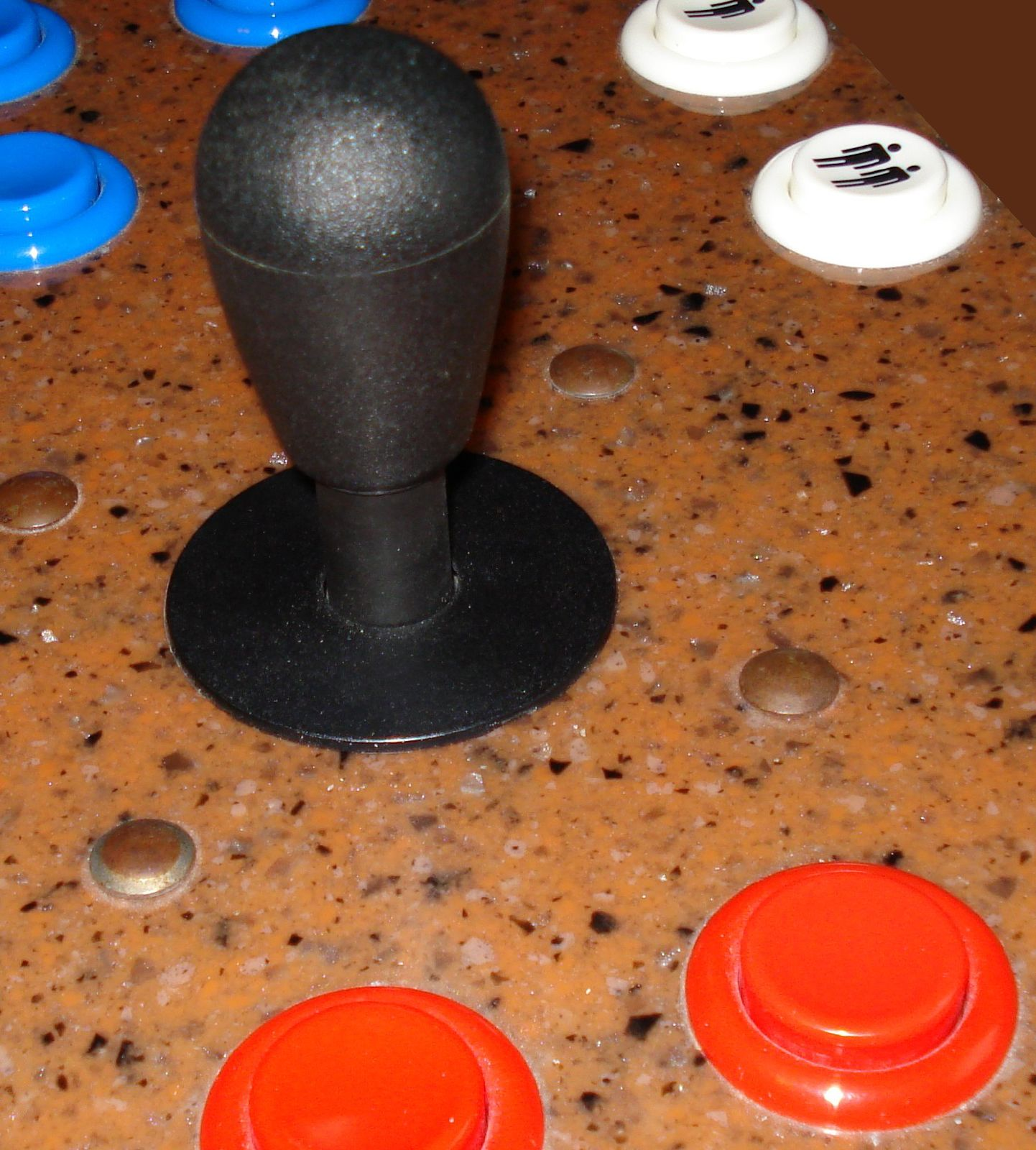
American style

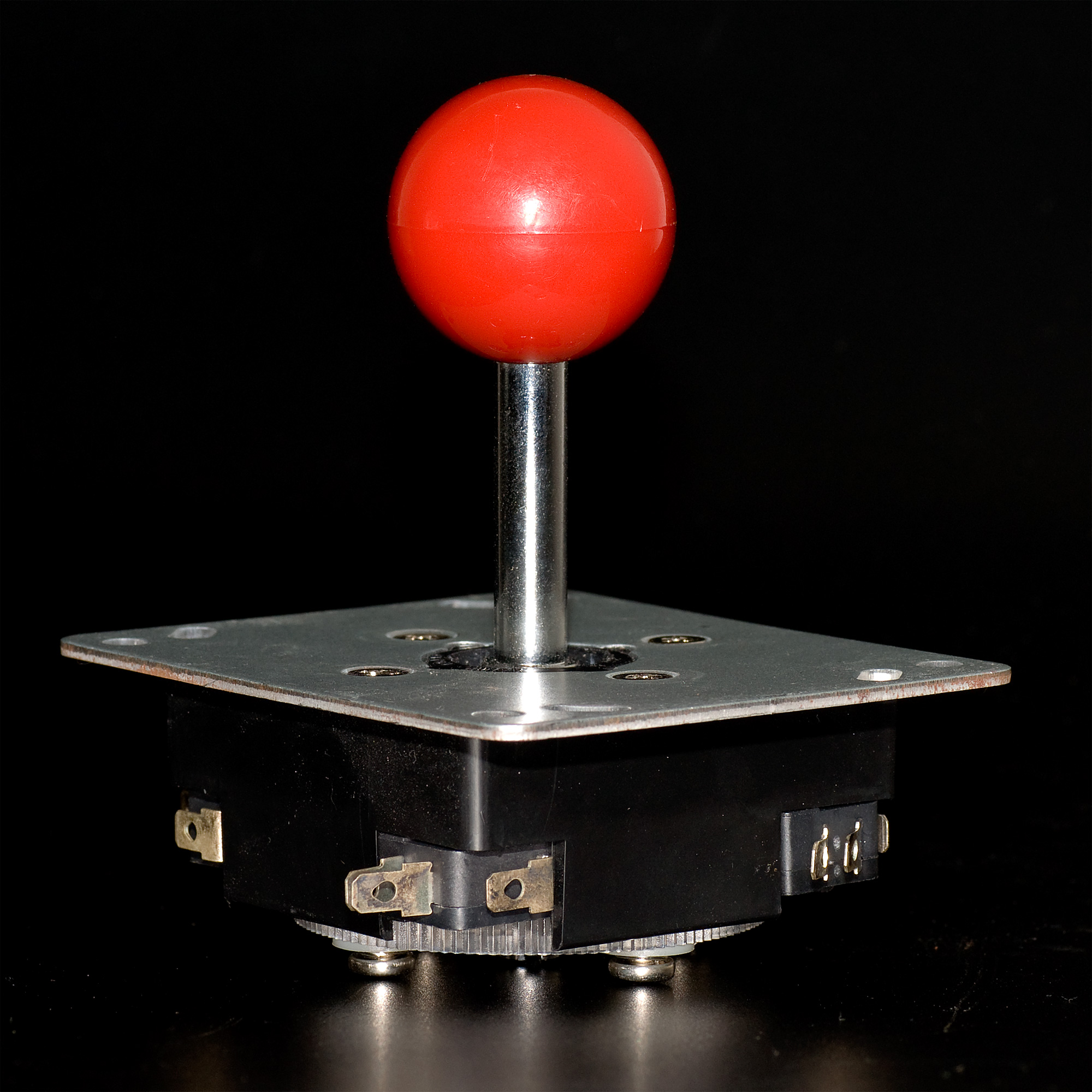
Japanese style

Traditionally, there has been a divide between "American-style" (associated with the manufacturer Happ) and "Japanese-style" (common to Sanwa and Seimitsu) designs. American joysticks are generally made from hard plastic, with a tall, thick shaft shaped like a baseball bat (bat-top). Common grips for this type of stick utilize 4-5 fingers for pull and push, but all involve grabbing the stick from the side. The stick has a high resistance due to the amount of leverage that it gives to the user. American buttons have a long stroke, which is associated with a clicking action (which also adds to resistance) to let the player know when the switch has been activated. The buttons are generally concave and designed to be pressed with one or two fingers.

Japanese joysticks have a large spherical ball (ball-top) positioned at the top of a short, thin metal shaft. In contrast to the bat-top, a ball-top grip can be reasonably approached from almost any direction—the side, above, or below, and with different placements of the fingers, according to preference. This gives the stick more flexibility towards a general audience, however the ball itself may be considered awkward to hold. Also, because of the shaft's low mounting height, users with large hands may find the setup to be uncomfortable and constricting. Because of the shorter shaft and lighter grips used with this type of stick, resistance is relatively low. Japanese button design is based on requiring less effort from the player to press, and as such they have short strokes and very little resistance. They do not click as there is usually no question as to whether the button has been pressed, however this also means that players may find them too sensitive, and resting fingers on buttons requires more care.

In recent years, with the decline of arcades in the West, some popular Japanese arcade games are no longer considered profitable enough to be worth localizing and producing domestically even though they are eventually ported to home consoles. Because these games rely on newer, often proprietary hardware such as HD flat-screen monitors, entire cabinets for these games must be imported from Japan. It is therefore becoming more common to see cabinets with Japanese-style controls in American arcades.

== Joystick grips ==
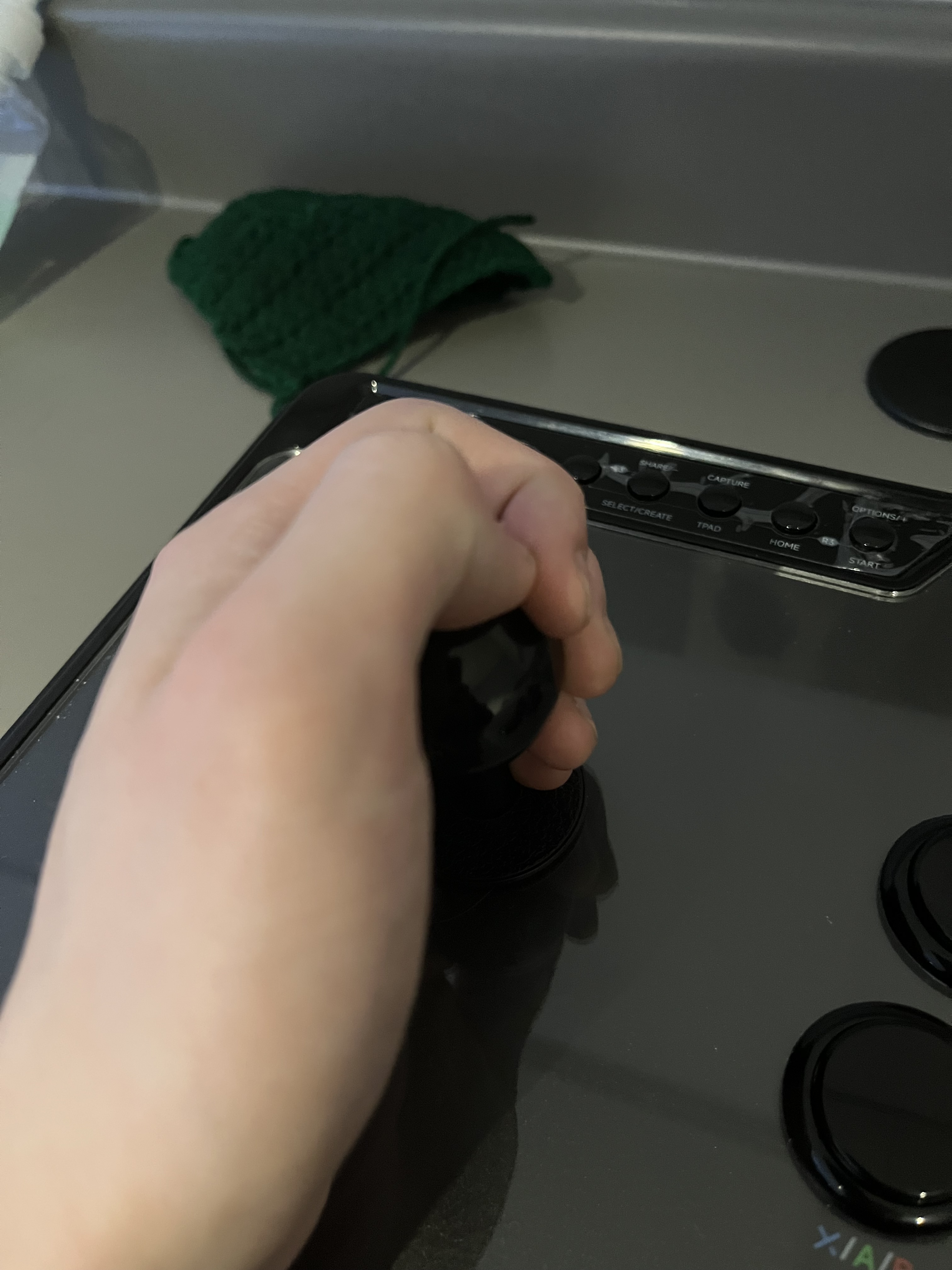
The broomstick grip. The palm and fingers wrap around the ball, with the thumb resting on top.

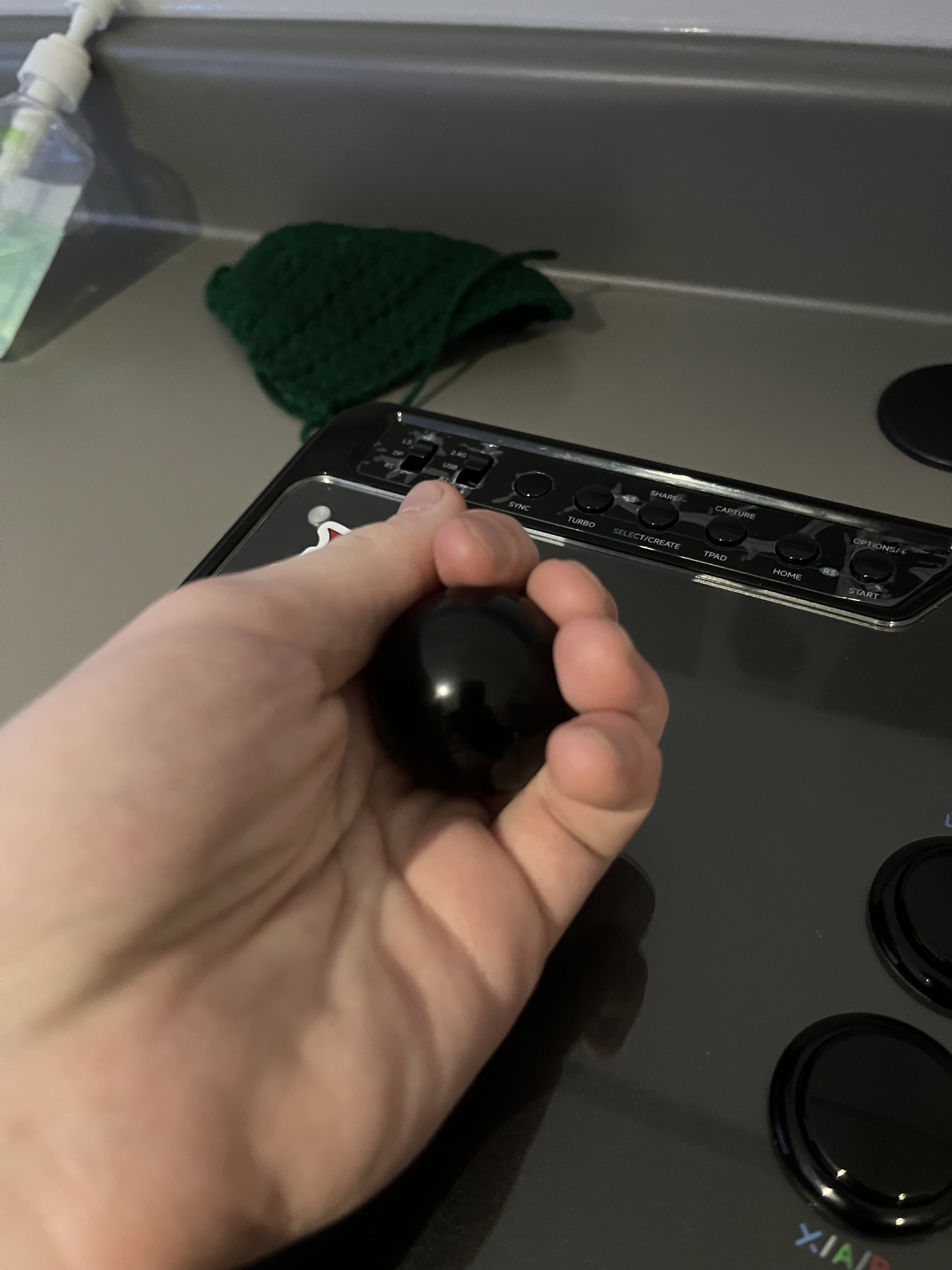
The wine-glass grip. Although the hand grips the ball top from beneath in this image, the grip can be performed with the hand sideways as well.

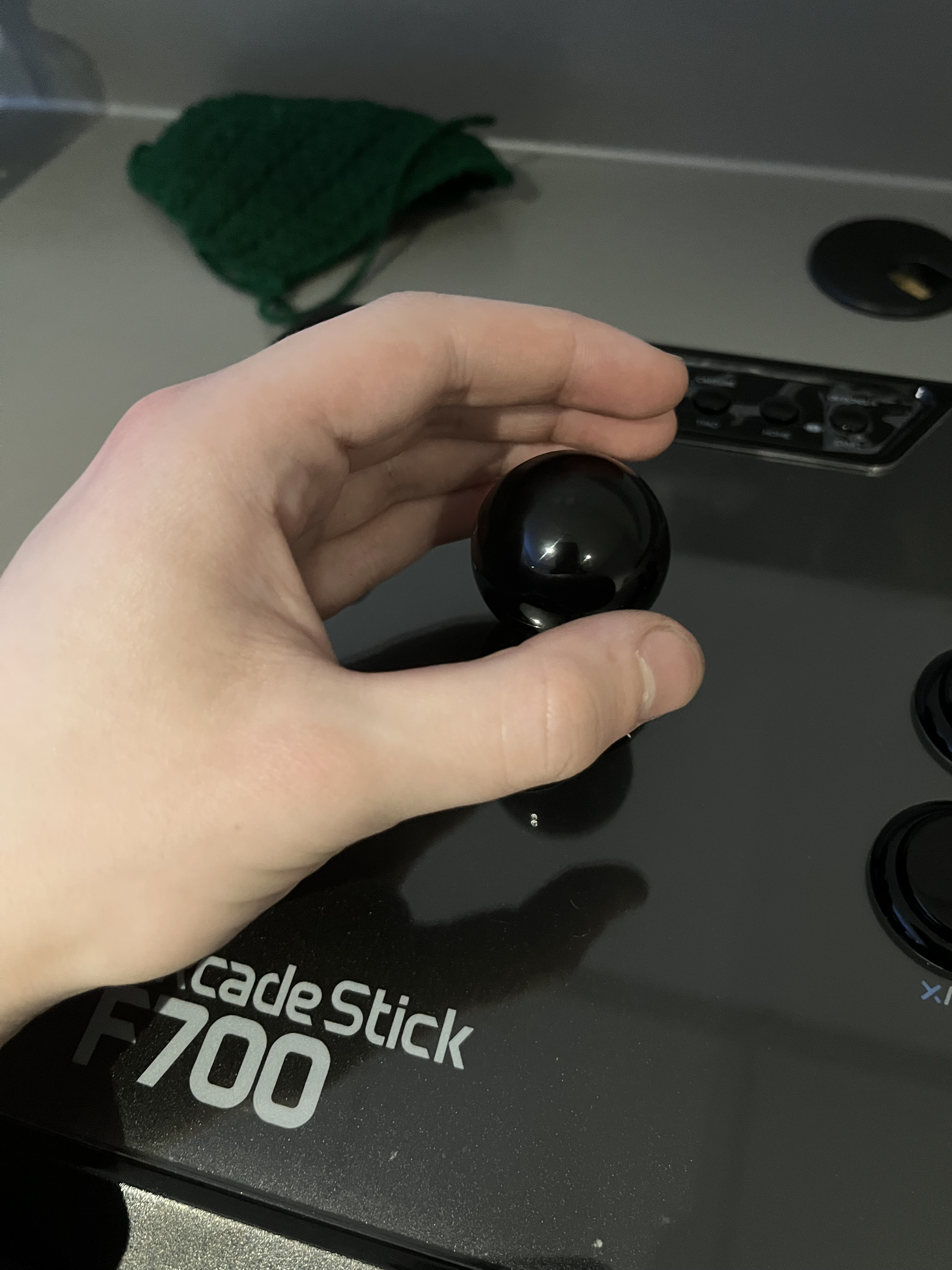
The Open-hand grip

There are many ways someone can grip the joystick on an arcade controller. One of these is the broomstick grip, which is commonly used for bat-top joysticks. The grip is done by holding the stick with your fingers and palm, with the thumb resting on top, akin to holding a broomstick handle. Some popular players who use the broomstick grip are Justin Wong and JDCR.

An alternative gripping style is called the wine-glass grip. It is done by gripping the fingers between the handle of the joystick (although this can also be accomplished with other fingers, such as pinky and ring finger). Some players turn their palm 90 degrees to rest on the side of the ball top, while others control the ball top from below much like a conventional wine-glass grip. Some notable players who use the wine-glass grip, or one of its variations, are Kazunoko and Daigo Umehara.

One last type of grip is the open-hand grip. Rather than continuously gripping the joystick, the open-hand grip wavers close to the joystick with a claw-shaped hand. When moving in a direction, the palm, fingers, and thumb are used to push or pull the joystick in one of nine hand-poses, each representing the directions in an octagonal restrictor gate.

== At home ==
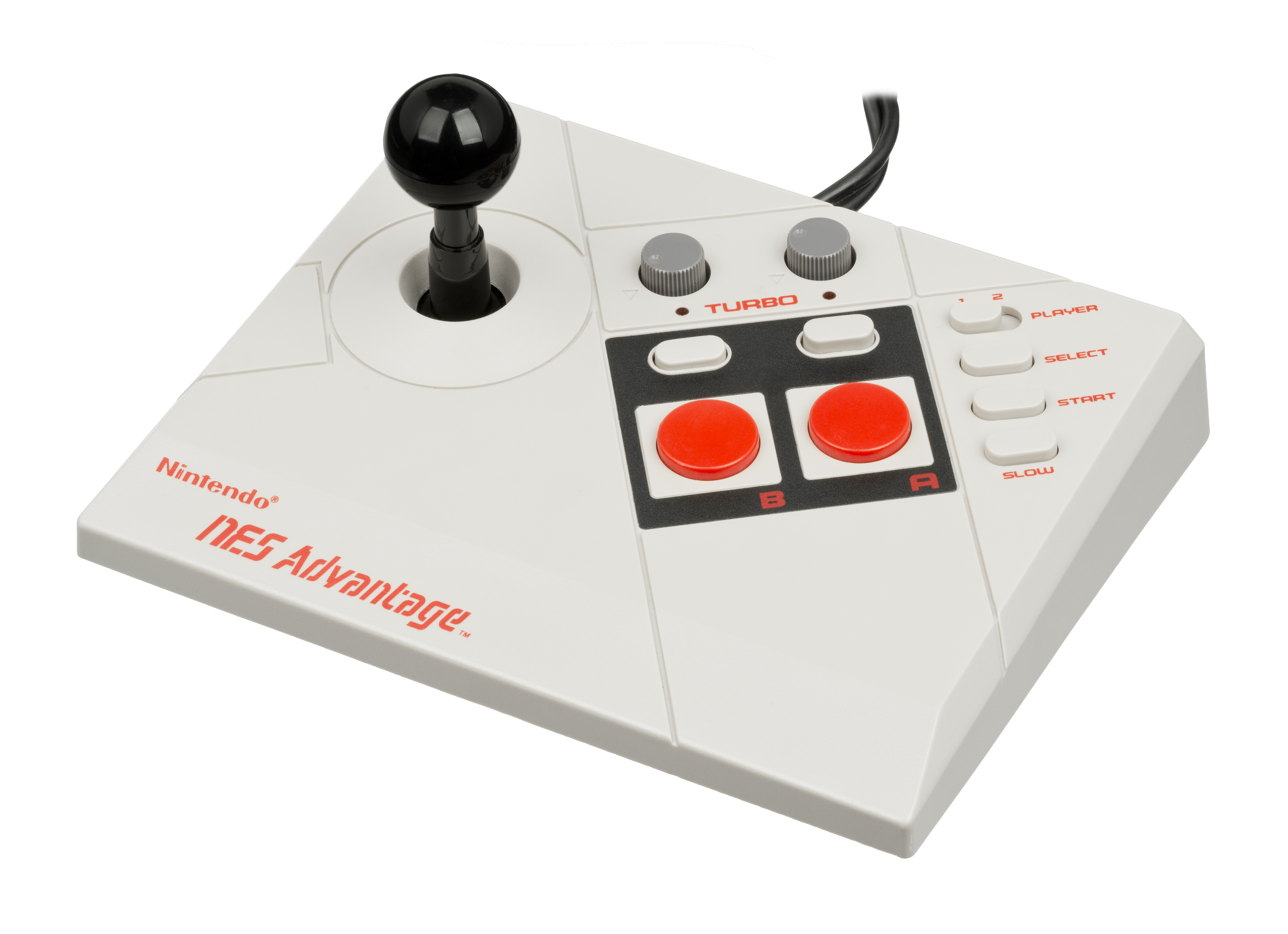
The NES Advantage, one of the earliest arcade imitations for a home console

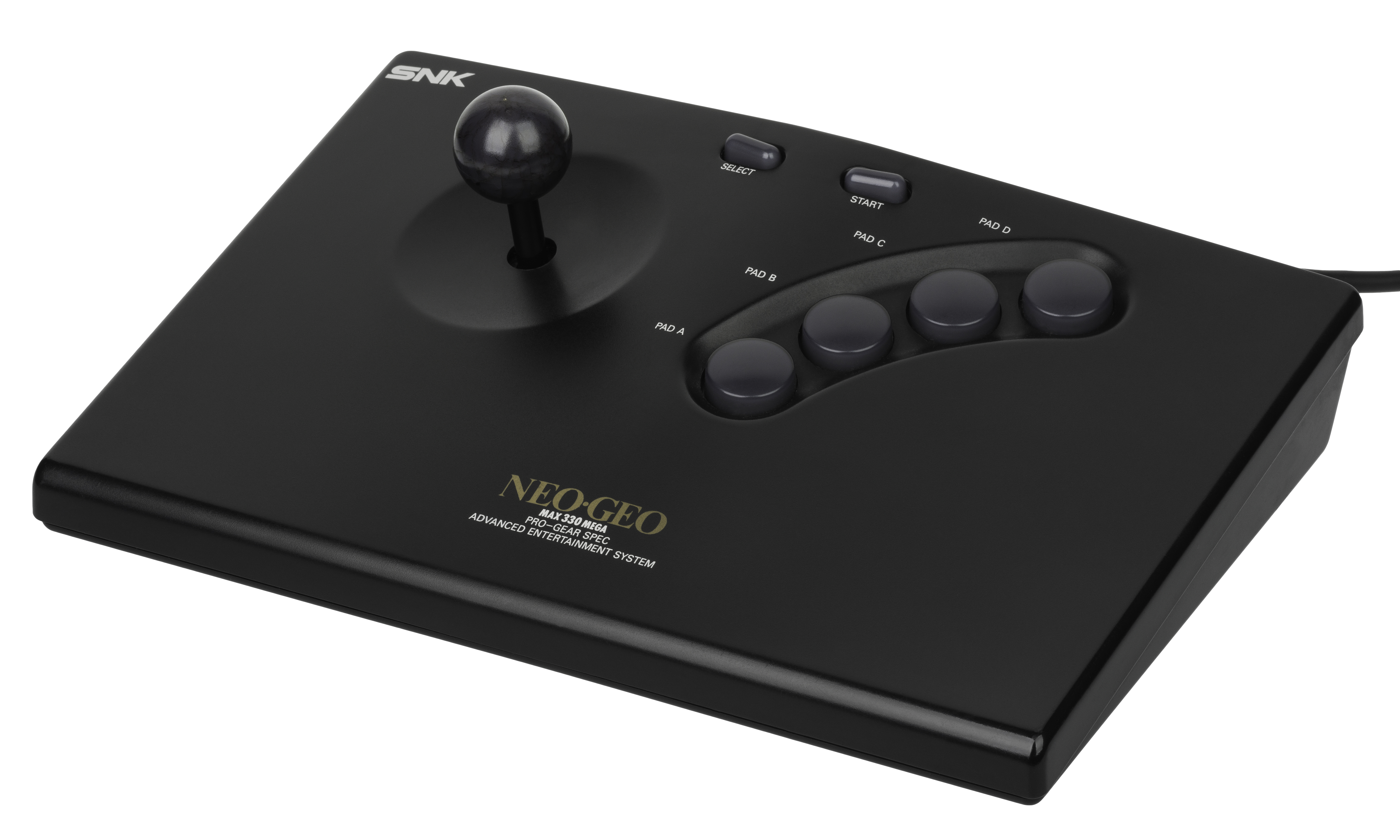
The Neo Geo AES is the only console to include an arcade-style controller as the pack-in controller.

Prior to the 2000s, it was generally accepted that most home consoles were not powerful enough to accurately replicate arcade games (such games are known as being "arcade-perfect"). As such, there was correspondingly little effort to bring arcade-quality controls into the home. Though many imitation arcade controllers were produced for various consoles and the PC, most were designed for affordability and few were able to deliver the responsiveness or feel of a genuine arcade setup.

Nevertheless, as early as 1990, SNK released the home version of its arcade Neo-Geo MVS system, called the Neo-Geo AES, which featured the exact (except for coin-op configuration possibilities unavailable on home console) same games on the AES (home console) as on the MVS (arcade system). SNK only made one type of arcade stick and no gamepad for this console. SNK's AES sturdy joystick was considered by many as the best arcade stick ever to be found on a 2D console at the time. The company Exar recently offered a revised reissue with extra buttons called "Neo Geo Stick 2" (as well as "2+" and "3" versions) for the PS&PS2 in Japan in 2005, for Wii in 2008, PS3 in 2009 and the "Neo Geo Pad USB" in 2010.

In the 2000s, especially outside Japan, arcade attendance decreased as more gamers migrated to increasingly powerful home consoles. In 1994, the Neo-Geo CD was the first CD console to translate arcade games on home systems in an upgraded version, the soundtracks being rendered in CD quality, the games besides this were similar to AES/MVS versions. It was available with a new D-pad arcade stick hybrid, and was compatible with the older AES arcade sticks as well. Although the Neo-Geo CD was able only to offer 2D games, in 1998, the Dreamcast was the first console to deliver at once 3D games and near-perfect arcade translations, thanks mostly to the similarity in hardware between it and Sega's NAOMI arcade system. Interest in bringing home the arcade experience grew steadily throughout the decade, with fighting game enthusiasts building their own controllers using parts from arcade manufacturers such as Sanwa Denshi, Happ, and Seimitsu. At the same time, the PC became increasingly competent as an arcade emulator with software such as MAME, and enthusiasts have built entire faux arcade cabinets to bring the total experience home. Arcade style controllers such as the X-Arcade provided more authentic controls for such setups.

Towards the end of the decade, the popularity of the game Street Fighter IV was credited for reviving interest in playing fighting games at the arcade, and for stimulating demand for arcade-quality controllers when the game was ported to home consoles. In a licensing deal for the home version of SF IV, Mad Catz produced the Street Fighter IV FightStick Tournament Edition, the first commercially available console stick in North America to include genuine (Sanwa) arcade parts. They also released a lower-cost version of the controller with Mad Catz's own imitation parts, but designed the housing so that the parts could easily be replaced, for those who wanted to upgrade later. This in turn generated more publicity for modding and building custom sticks. These controllers have also been given the nickname of "fightstick".

=== Leverless arcade controller ===
A leverless arcade controller, also called a leverless controller, a box controller, a button box, an all-button controller, or a "Hitbox", named after the same the company that produced the first commercially available leverless devices, is a type of controller that has the layout of an arcade stick for its attack buttons but replaces the joystick lever with four buttons that control up, down, left and right. One of their earlier designs and controllers were originally made for Super Smash Bros. Melee called the Smash Box. Mixbox is also a well-known manufacturer. Usually, the button for up is placed low on the controller, within reach of the thumbs of both hands for easy use and have since become popular in many fighting games. These types of controllers are also known as a "cheatbox" since the device lets players do some things a normal arcade stick would cause them to struggle with.

Leverless controllers can be rather difficult to get used to at first, since a lot of muscle memory for a regular stick or a controller is lost, but the benefits for some games can be very high; games like Tekken 7, Street Fighter 5, or Guilty Gear Strive where there are difficult just frame inputs for moves like specials are now much easier, since pressing two buttons is much more consistent than timing the movement of a joystick to a button press. It also takes less time to press a button than to move a joystick, which means that movement can be more responsive, and players can do some moves faster on reaction. Users of leverless devices have to be careful about SOCD (Simultaneous Opposite Cardinal Directions) in which conflicting inputs both the left and right, or up and down, buttons at the same time can cause control issues in game. If the game is not programmed to handle these instances of SOCD issues can occur such as input lockups and delays causing movements not being registered properly thus breaking the flow of a game.
