= Datach =

Datach Joint ROM System
- Datach Joint ROM System inserted into a Family Computer
- Developer: Bandai
- Publisher: Bandai
- Platform: Family Computer
- Release: 1992
- Genre: Barcode battling
- Modes: Single-player, multiplayer

The Datach (Japanese: データック, Hepburn: Dētakku) or Datach Joint ROM System, is an enhancement accessory by Bandai for the Family Computer, allowing the system to play select compatible games. Released on December 29, 1992, it is packaged with one game, Dragon Ball Z: Gekitō Tenkaichi Budokai. Six other games were released for it, including one of the final games for the Famicom system in 1994. It is one of two mini systems compatible with the NES or Famicom, the other being the Aladdin Deck Enhancer.

== Design ==
The Datach consists of a cartridge connection at its bottom, a central cartridge chamber on its back, with two spring-loaded pins on either side, which are pushed up when the unit is inserted into the Famicom, allowing the game to only be removed when the Datach has been removed from the Famicom. Its main feature is the card reading slot on the front. The cartridges resemble half-size Famicom cartridges. One side of the cartridge is flat with title sticker, while the other side is sloped inward with notches on the left and right, which correspond to the spring pins on the main Datach unit.

The cards that come with the games are swiped from left to right along the card slot; they are glossy on the front with an image of the character and the backs are smooth usually having the title of the game and barcode. All cartridges, boxes, instructions have the standard FF (Famicom Family) insignia, showing they are officially licensed by Nintendo.

== Games ==
Datach box, cartridges, and cards

Seven games were made for the Datach. The first was packaged with the Datach and the remaining ones were released separately.

Dragon Ball Z: Gekitō Tenkaichi Budokai (ドラゴンボールZ。 激闘天下一武道会), literally translated as "Dragon Ball Z: Fierce Fighting on the Martial Arts Tournament for the Bests on Earth", was released on December 29, 1992, along with the initial release of the Datach. It comes with forty cards which have images from the anime series Dragon Ball Z.

SD Gundam: Gundam Wars (SDガンダム。 ガンダムウォーズ) was released on April 23, 1993, it was one of two Datach games released that day. It is based on the SD Gundam anime series and toy line.

Ultraman Club: Spokon Fight! (ウルトラマン倶楽部 スポ根ファイト!), literally translated as "Ultraman Club: Sports Fighting Spirit Fight!", was released on April 23, 1993. It was one of two Datach games released that day. It features the classic Ultraman characters in sports related settings.

Crayon Shin-Chan: Ora to Poi Poi (クレヨンしんちゃん オラとポイポイ) was released on August 27, 1993, the same day as a Famicom version of the game. It stars the famous Japanese character Crayon Shin-chan.

Yū Yū Hakusho: Bakutō Ankoku Bujutsukai (幽☆遊☆白書 爆闘暗黒武術会), literally translated as "Ghost Files: Explosive Tournament of Dark Martial Arts", was released on October 22, 1993, and is based on the anime series YuYu Hakusho.

Battle Rush: Build Up Robot Tournament (バトルラッシュ Build Up Robot Tournament) was released on November 13, 1993, and is a robot creating and fighting game.

J-League Super Top Players (Jリーグ スーパートッププレイヤーズ) was released on April 22, 1994. It is a soccer simulation game with barcodes for the players' skills.

== See also ==
- List of Famicom games
- Aladdin Deck Enhancer
- Family Trainer
- Barcode Battler II - another barcode reader that can be used with the Famicom
- Sufami Turbo - a similar mini-cartridge adaptor (without barcode reader) from Bandai for Super Famicom
