= Castlequest =

- NES box art
- Developer: ASCII Corporation
- Publishers: ASCII Corporation; Nexoft Corporation
- Designers: Isao Yoshida; Keisuke Iwakura
- Composer: Mitsunori Ogihara (Famicom)
- Platforms: MSX; Family Computer; Nintendo Entertainment System
- Release: JP: 1985 (computers); JP: November 28, 1986 (Famicom); NA: September 1989 (NES)
- Genres: Puzzle, Action
- Mode: Single-player

Castlequest, known in Japan as Castle Excellent (キャッスルエクセレント, Kyassuru Ekuserento), is a 1985 puzzle-action video game developed and published by ASCII Corporation for the FM-7, PC-88, and Sharp X1. Additional versions followed in 1986 for the Family Computer and MSX, and was subsequently released in 1989 for the Nintendo Entertainment System in the United States by Nexoft Corporation (the American division of ASCII).

It is the sequel to The Castle, released in 1985 for the MSX, SG-1000, and other systems (though not the NES). Like that game, it is an early example of the Metroidvania genre.

== Gameplay ==
The object of the game is to navigate through Groken Castle to rescue Princess Margarita. The player can push certain objects throughout the game to accomplish progress. In some rooms, the prince can only advance to the next room by aligning brick blocks, barrels, Candles, and Elevator Controlling Block. In some rooms, this can be quite time-consuming since the prince can only open a particular door if he can stand by the door, meaning that he cannot open the door while in mid-jump. The prince must also carry a key that matches the color of the door he intends to be open. The player can navigate the castle with the help of a map found in the first room. The map will provide the player with a matrix of 10x10 rooms and will highlight the room in which the princess is located. The player must also avoid touching enemies like Knights, Bishops, Wizards, Fire Spirits, Vikings and Phantom Flowers.

== Release ==
In the Family Computer and NES versions, each room is wider than the screen, so the display scrolls horizontally as the player moves. Because of the different room sizes, many adjustments to the room layouts were made in comparison to the MSX version. In the Family Computer version, the player starts with 4 lives, and the game supports the Famicom Data Recorder and ASCII Turbo File peripherals for saving and loading game progress. When the game was reworked for the US NES release, the save/load feature was removed (the NES does not have the 15-pin expansion port which the Turbo File connects to). However, the player has 50 instead of 4 lives initially. There are two magical fairies to help. Another obvious difference between the MSX and NES/Family Computer versions is that the player can attack enemies with his sword (or dagger) only in the NES/Family Computer versions. This attack is limited because the enemy must be very close to the player for the kill to take place, which puts the player at risk because timing is crucial. The prince can dash and retrieve his weapon on a timely basis, and attacking in the wrong time can prevent the player from launching another attack when the enemy is in the right location to be attacked, leading to the certain loss of one life from the player. This scenario, however, is not relevant to the MSX version, since the only way to eliminate an enemy is to throw an object on it, or to force the enemy to climb an escalator and remain there until it is crushed to the ceiling.

== Reception ==
Reception

Review score
Publication	Score
Biweekly Famicom Tsūshin	8/10, 6/10, 7/10, 6/10 (Note: Each of the four reviewers in Famitsu scored the game on a ten point scale)

Reviewing the Famicom port, the reviewers in Biweekly Famicom Tsūshin commented that the port on the Famicom about as high quality as the port of Lode Runner while other reviewers complimented the cute character designs and lamented the games difficulty. Gary Meredith of Game Players felt that despite starting with 50 lives, the lack of a save feature could make completing the NES version in one sitting frustrating and difficult. "Still, Castlequest is a fascinating game," he said. "Especially for those tired of shooting or slashing their way through the more action-oriented adventures." Nintendo Power stated, "The action is slow, but the challenge in logic is among the greatest we've seen." The magazine also noted the lack of a continue feature, but said the room reset function in the sub-command menu was helpful.
