= Mach Rider =

1985 video game

- North American NES box art
- Developer: HAL Laboratory
- Publisher: Nintendo
- Composer: Hideki Kanazashi
- Platforms: NES, arcade
- Release: NES: JP: November 21, 1985; NA: August 1986; EU: March 15, 1987; Arcade: JP: August 1985; NA: 1985
- Genre: Vehicular combat
- Mode: Single-player
- Arcade system: Nintendo VS. System

Mach Rider (Note: Japanese: マッハライダー, Hepburn: Mahha Raidā) is a vehicular combat racing video game developed by HAL Laboratory and published by Nintendo. It was first released for the Famicom console and Nintendo VS. System arcade board in Japan in 1985, then in North America for the VS. System in 1985 and Nintendo Entertainment System in 1986, and then for the PAL region in 1987. It was released on the Virtual Console for the Wii (2007), Nintendo 3DS (2013), Wii U (2014), and for the Nintendo Switch on the Nintendo Classics service (2024).

The Japanese Famicom release can use the Famicom Data Recorder to save custom tracks. The feature was missing from the American and European releases, but was retained in all versions of the Virtual Console release except for the 3DS version.

== Development ==
In 1972, Nintendo originally released a plastic race car or hot rod toy called Mach Rider. It has a ramp for jumping and a stick shift with three different kinds of meters. The car is placed inside of it, to be charged up and released at high speed.

== Gameplay ==
Mach Rider takes place in the year 2112, and planet Earth has been invaded by evil forces driving vehicles known as Quadrunners. The player controls Mach Rider, who travels from sector to sector on a high-powered superbike, searching for survivors and destroying any enemies in their path.

The game's controls are somewhat more complex than other games at its time and require some extra skills. The left and right directions on the Control Pad steer Mach Rider and the A button accelerates. The B button fires Mach Rider's machine gun which can be used to destroy enemies and obstacles on the road. The up and down buttons are used to shift gears. Mach Rider's bike has four speeds and shifting to the fourth gear at high speed will grant the player in instant speed boost. Conversely, the player remaining in a higher gear while stopping results in a slower acceleration.

In each round, points can be scored by destroying enemies and certain obstacles with the machine gun. The number of points scored for destroying enemies and obstacles is determined by the type of enemy or obstacle destroyed. If the player blocks an attacking enemy by ramming it against a hazard on the track, they obtain more points — this also replenishes Mach Rider's bullets.

- Fighting Course consists of the primary story sequence. The player controls Mach Rider as they travel across 10 different sectors, and tries to avoid being destroyed by obstacles such as Oil Drums and their enemies, the Quadrunners. If Mach Rider is destroyed, they will separate into fragments and then reform, as long as they have energy (lives from the second sector on) remaining. Much like other games of the time, such as Ice Climber and Balloon Fight, there is no ending sequence. Once the 10th sector is completed, the story starts anew, with a second quest of 10 entirely new sectors. After the 20th sector is done, then the story starts again, but with the original sectors. On each sector in Fighting Course, the player is given the choice to ride to the next sector on either Track A or Track B. The two tracks are different from one another and with each new sector there are new tracks.
- Endurance Course: The player must race a certain number of kilometres within a time limit while enemies and obstacles get in the way and slow down the progress. Lives and energy are not a factor in Endurance, but being destroyed causes a loss of time.
- Solo Course: This is the same as Endurance Course, but with no enemies.
- Design Mode: This is where the player may design their own sector and race on it using one any of the three other modes of play, but like Excitebike, the original game required the Famicom Data Recorder in order to save the tracks, and the device was never released outside Japan. The feature was restored for international markets in the Wii and Wii U Virtual Console versions of the game, which allow the player to save their tracks onto the system memory.

== VS. Mach Rider ==
VS. Mach Rider was released for the Nintendo VS. System in arcades. It is essentially a modified version of the Endurance Course in the Famicom version. After each level, another piece of an image is revealed of a woman with a dagger next to Mach Rider's bike.

== Reception ==
Reception

Review score
Publication	Score
AllGame	4/5
