= Acclaim Remote Controller =

Third-party controller for the Nintendo Entertainment System

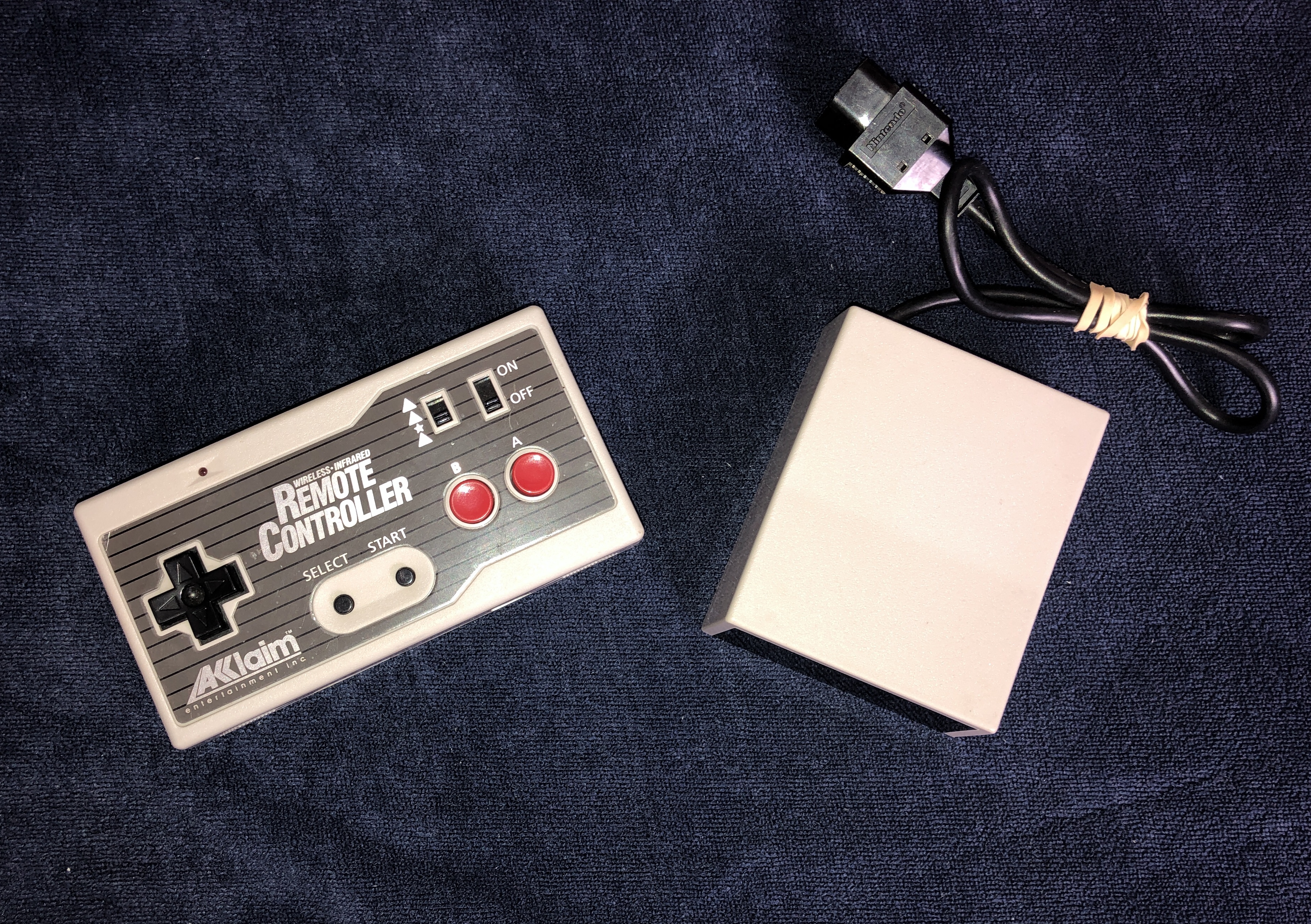
The Acclaim Remote Controller and receiver for the Nintendo Entertainment System

The Acclaim Remote Controller is a third party wireless game controller developed by Acclaim Entertainment Inc for the Nintendo Entertainment System (NES) in 1989. This accessory used standard IR signals, commonly found in other remote controls of the time, to send button inputs from the wireless control pad to a receiver plugged into a controller port on the console.

== History and design ==
Originally when redesigning the NES for the North American video game market, it was conceived to have all wireless controllers. This idea was abandoned in further redesigns of the console due to poor audience reception of the Advanced Video System. As a result, Nintendo did not release a first party wireless controller for the NES. The NES Satellite was released as an official wireless peripheral in 1989. This accessory connects up to four standard wired controllers to a wireless hub that can transmit button inputs to a receiver plugged into the console.

The button layout on the Acclaim Remote is identical to a standard NES control pad. However the controller itself built thicker to fit in 4 AAA batteries. This accessory also has an adjustable turbo switch, to allow a user to hold down a button instead of pressing it multiple times, as well as a power switch, to allow the user to conserve battery life when not in use. This accessory allowed gamers to be up to 30 feet away from the receiver but it required a clear line-of-sight between the controller and the receiver.

== Reception ==
The Acclaim Remote Controller initially sold for $40 when released in the United States. Another wireless controller, called the Quickshot, competed at a much lower price point of $15. Popular Mechanics Magazine noted that other wired controllers from third-party sellers offered more features. Some noted that the advertising for this controller was too vague and non-descriptive.
