= Hori (company) =

Japanese manufacturer of gaming parts

HORI Co., Ltd.
- Native name: 株式会社ホリ
- Type: Brand
- Industry: Computer and game console peripherals
- Founded: 1970; 56 years ago, Kanagawa Prefecture, Japan
- Headquarters: Yokohama City, Japan
- Products: Steering wheel; joysticks; gamepads
- Subsidiaries: HORI (USA) INC. (North America) HORI (HK) CO LTD. (Hong Kong) HORI (UK) LTD. (Europe)
- Website: hori.jp

HORI Co., Ltd. (commonly known as HORI) is a Japanese manufacturer of gamepads, racing wheels, headsets, arcade sticks and other accessories for consoles under third-party agreements with companies such as Nintendo, Microsoft (Xbox) and Sony (PlayStation). HORI entered the video game market in 1985 with the release of a peripheral for the Nintendo Entertainment System. Today, sim racing wheels, such as the HORI Apex Racing Wheel, are HORI's best selling-products.

== History ==
Formed in February 1970 as Hori Electric Co., Ltd., the company was one of the first manufacturers of third-party peripherals for video and audio equipment, before entering the video game market in 1985. The company quickly grew after cooperating with companies like Sega shortly after the launch of its video game hardware. HORI has also brought Nintendo accessories to the market and became a launch partner for Nintendo Switch Lite third-party Joy-Con in 2019.
