= NES Advantage =

Accessory for the Nintendo Entertainment System

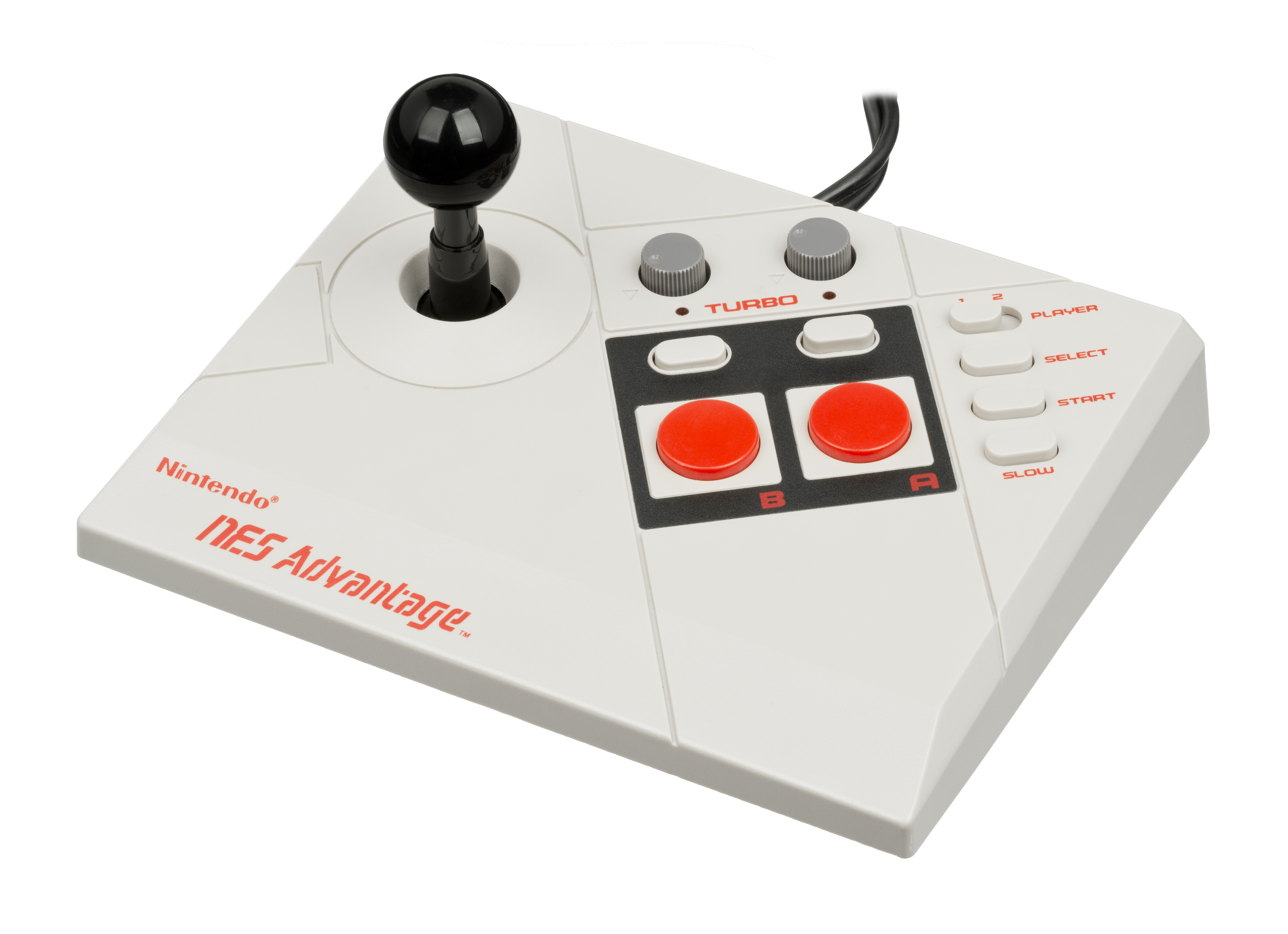
- Manufacturer: Asciiware
- Type: Video game controller
- Generation: Third generation era
- Released: July 1987
- Input: Joystick (8 direction); 7x digital buttons (A, B, Turbo A, Turbo B, Start, Select, Slow); 2x adjustment knobs (Turbo A, Turbo B); Toggle switch (Player)
- Connectivity: NES controller port
- Successor: Super Advantage

The NES Advantage is an arcade controller manufactured by Asciiware and released by Nintendo for the Nintendo Entertainment System in 1987. The device is meant to rest on a flat surface at a comfortable level, such as a tabletop or the floor, with the player seated behind it. This way, it can be used like an arcade game joystick—with the left hand using the joystick and the right hand operating the buttons.

== Features ==
The NES Advantage features adjustable turbo controls for the A and B buttons which could be toggled on or off with a button; users can adjust the rate of the turbo (i.e., how quickly the A or B button is pressed) by adjusting the respective turbo dials located above each button. The Advantage features a pseudo–slow motion feature, which users can toggle on and off by pressing the "slow" button. However, the slow motion feature does not work with all games, including games compatible with the NES Zapper or R.O.B. accessories. The slow button works by very rapidly pressing a virtual start button, which could lead to problems when the player attempts to do an action while the game is paused (e.g., jumping or firing). This feature was not compatible with games with start menus or pause screens. The slow motion feature was unique at release, though it became a popular feature on later controllers. The controller has two wires to plug into both controller ports. By toggling a switch between "Player 1" and "Player 2", the Advantage can be shared with another player for games where two players alternate gameplay.

=== Design ===
The NES Advantage is designed to simulate the look and feel of cabinet arcade game controls, the idea being to make gaming at home feel more like gaming in a video arcade. However, unlike actual arcade cabinets, the NES Advantage uses rubber switches for the buttons and joystick (like a controller), rather than microswitches. The device has a rugged plastic exterior case with a stainless steel bottom plate, and four rubber feet to prevent skidding. Due to the shape, size and styling the Advantage looks and feels very similar to the NES itself.

== In popular culture ==
In the film Ghostbusters II, an NES Advantage was used to guide the Statue of Liberty to the center of the city during the climax of the movie.

In the 1989 television series Captain N: The Game Master, the main character Kevin Keene can be seen in a live-action sequence playing Punch-Out!!, and another one playing The Adventures of Bayou Billy, both with an NES Advantage.

Christina Aguilera uses one in the video for "Your Body".

== Reception ==
Upon the Advantage's initial release in 1987, it was well received as a great way to get the "arcade experience" at home. Since its successful release in the '80s, the NES Advantage has received little media attention, but has continued to be regarded as one of the best NES accessories ever produced.

== See also ==
- Nintendo Entertainment System
- Super Advantage
- NES Max
- List of Nintendo controllers
