= Famicom Data Recorder =

Data cassette recorder for the Family Computer

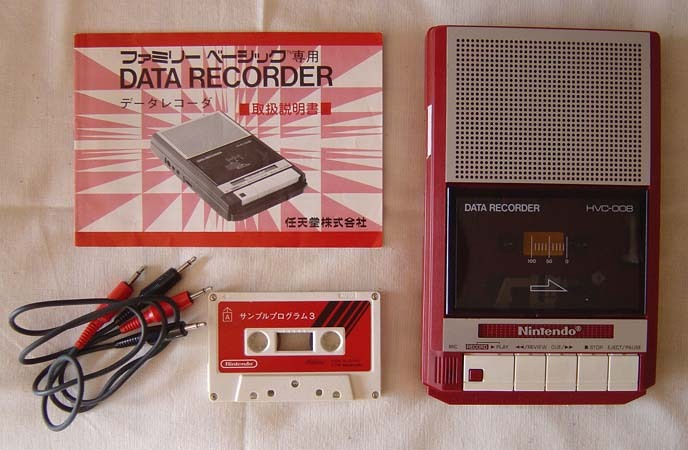
- Famicom Data Recorder HVC-008
- Manufacturer: Nintendo
- Type: Video game console accessory
- Generation: Third generation
- Released: JP: 1984
- Media: Compact cassette tape

The Famicom Data Recorder (HVC-008) is a compact cassette tape data interface introduced in 1984, for the Family Computer. It is compatible with eight Famicom titles, for saving user-generated content to tapes. It was Nintendo's first rewritable storage medium, the second one would follow shortly after with the Family Computer Disk System's floppy disks in 1986.

== History ==
Home game consoles may present the player with the opportunity for storing game positions and original user-generated content such as custom game levels. Based on the read-only memory cartridge medium, the premium cost of easy-to-use solid-state data storage technology, such as battery-backed memory, drove the 1980s market to seek cheaper compromises. Utilizing standard compact cassette tapes, Nintendo began with the Famicom Data Recorder. A compatible game runs on cartridge and optionally allows the creation of user-generated content to be saved onto cassette tapes using this tape drive.

Manufactured by Matsushita/Panasonic for Nintendo, the cassette tape drive was released in 1984 only in Japan for ¥9,800. Available to any game developer, it was launched as a peripheral for Nintendo's Family BASIC Keyboard to save BASIC programs written by users. In addition to Family BASIC, this compatible game library is Nintendo's Programmable Series with Excitebike (1984), Mach Rider (1985), and Wrecking Crew (1985)—and the third party games Castle Excellent (1989), Arkanoid II (1988), Lode Runner (1984), and Nuts & Milk (1984).

As production costs decreased over the years, Nintendo later developed the floppy disk based Famicom Disk System, and ASCII Corporation created an external battery-backed RAM-disk called the Turbo File.

== Operation ==
The Famicom Data Recorder is powered either by a 6 volt adapter or 4 AA batteries. The Recorder can be used as a conventional sound recorder, and includes a built in microphone in the bottom left hand corner of the unit. The Recorder has mono sound output from a built in speaker on the top of the unit. A convenient volume control is accessible on the left hand side.

The Recorder has two data ports that use a conventional 3.5mm mono phone connector. The port on the left hand side is labeled "ear" and "load". The port on the right is labeled as "Mic" and "Save". When used as a data storage device the phone cables connected to the corresponding "write" and "save" ports on the Family BASIC keyboard.

The Data Recorder set includes an instruction manual, a data cable, a Nintendo-branded compact cassette, a 6 volt AC adapter, and a carrying handle that extends from the front bezel.
