= Turbo Touch 360 =

Line of aftermarket video game controllers

The Turbo Touch 360 is a series of aftermarket third-party controllers made by Triax for the Nintendo Entertainment System, Super NES, IBM PC compatible and Sega Genesis (the latter version also being compatible with Atari and Commodore systems). The Turbo Touch 360 was first shown off at the International Consumer Electronics Show in late 1993, but the controller never replaced the D-Pad in later consoles because it was reported to be overly sensitive and uncomfortable to use. PC compatible versions of the control have largely been discarded due to better replacements being available and are now considered the rarest version of the control and very rarely appear for sale, console versions remain widely available on the used market.

== Design and functionality ==
Whereas most controllers used a D-pad with mechanical switches, the Turbo Touch had an octagonal plate with eight capacitive touch sensors arranged in the cardinal directions; contrary to the "360" name, the controller only provided digital input along the cardinal directions. The idea was that the controller could be operated with less physical force, reducing thumb injuries and "numb thumb", thereby improving player comfort and health. The controller was endorsed by Dr. Robert Grossman, an orthopedic surgeon specializing in sports injuries.

Other than the touchpad, the controllers have a standard set of features typical for controllers of the time, with turbo support.

== Reception ==
The controller was ranked the ninth worst video game controller by IGN editor Craig Harris.
