= Happ =

Happ is a surname. Notable people with the surname include:

- Dieter Happ (born 1970), Austrian snowboarder
- Ethan Happ (born 1996), American basketball player
- Ian Happ (born 1994), American baseball player
- J. A. Happ (born 1982), American baseball player
- Thomas "Tom" Happ, developer of Axiom Verge and its sequel

== See also ==
- Club Enrique Happ
- SuzoHapp North America
