= Turbo File (ASCII) =

Nintendo consoles peripheral

The Turbo File devices from ASCII Corporation are external storage devices for saved game data on various Nintendo consoles. They have been sold only in Japan, and are mainly supported by ASCII's own games. The first one was designed primarily to allow players transfer data between the Wizardry games released on the Famicom (and later Game Boy and Super Famicom).

== Turbofile ==
Turbofile is for the Famicom, and was released in 1986. It contains 8 kilobytes of battery-backed SRAM. It connects to the Famicom's 15-pin controller expansion port.

It is supported by:

- Best Play Pro Yakyuu (1988) ASCII (J)
- Best Play Pro Yakyuu '90 (1990) (J)
- Best Play Pro Yakyuu II (1990) (J)
- Best Play Pro Yakyuu Special (1992) (J)
- Castle Excellent (1986) ASCII (J) (early access method without filename) (also supports the Famicom Data Recorder)
- Derby Stallion - Zenkoku Ban (1992) Sonobe Hiroyuki/ASCII (J)
- Downtown - Nekketsu Monogatari (1989) Technos Japan Corp (J)
- Dungeon Kid (1990) Quest/Pixel (J)
- Fleet Commander (1988) ASCII (J)
- Haja no Fuuin (1986) ASCII/KGD (J)
- Itadaki Street - Watashi no Mise ni Yottette (1990) ASCII (J)
- Ninja Rahoi! (J)
- Wizardry - Legacy of Llylgamyn (1989) (J)
- Wizardry - Proving Grounds of the Mad Overlord (1987) (J)
- Wizardry - The Knight of Diamonds (1990) (J)

== Turbo File II ==
The Turbo File II was designed for the Famicom. Almost the same as Turbo File, but contains 32 Kbytes battery-backed SRAM, divided into 4 slots of 8 Kbytes, the slots are selectable via a 4-position switch. Additionally, it has slot for Data ROM Packs, an ASCII proprietary cartridge format usable to add in-game content. The only game to ever use it was baseball manager Best Play Pro Yakyū, for which only 2 cartridges with updated team data were released which could be ordered by mail, ベストプレープロ野球データROM'89-apr and ベストプレープロ野球データROM'90-jun.

== Turbo File Adapter ==
Turbo File Adapter is for the Super Famicom, and was released around 1992. It allows to connect a Turbo File or Turbo File II to Super Famicom consoles. Aside from the pin-conversion (15pin Famicom to 7pin Super Famicom controller port), the device contains some electronics to add a SNES-controller ID code, and a more complicated transmission protocol for entering the data transfer mode.

It is supported by:

- Ardy Lightfoot (1993)
- Derby Stallion II (1994)
- Derby Stallion III (1995) (supports both TFII and STF modes)
- Derby Stallion 96 (1996) (supports both TFII and STF modes, plus Satellaview mini FLASH cartridges)
- Derby Stallion 98 (NP) (1998) (supports both TFII and STF modes)
- Down the World: Mervil's Ambition (1994)
- Kakinoki Shogi (1995)
- Tactics Ogre: Let Us Cling Together (1995) (supports both TFII and STF modes)
- Wizardry V: Heart of the Maelstrom (1992) (Japanese version only - the Turbo File hardware detection is made non-functional in the US-version).

== Turbo File Twin ==
Turbo File Twin is for the Super Famicom, and was released around 1995. It contains 160 kilobytes of battery-backed SRAM. 4×8 kilobytes are used in the four TFII-modes (emulating a Turbo File II with Turbo File Adapter), and the remaining 128 kilobytes are used for a new SNES-specific "STF" mode. The STF mode is supported by:

- Bahamut Lagoon (1996) Square
- Daisenryaku Expert WWII: War in Europe (1996) SystemSoftAlpha/ASCII Corp (JP)
- Dark Law: Meaning of Death (1997) ASCII (JP)
- Derby Stallion III (1995) (supports both TFII and STF modes)
- Derby Stallion 96 (1996) (supports both TFII and STF modes, plus Satellaview mini FLASH cartridges)
- Derby Stallion 98 (NP) (1998) (supports both TFII and STF modes)
- Gunple: Gunman's Proof (1997) ASCII/Lenar (JP)
- Mini Yonku/4WD Shining Scorpion - Let's & Go!! (1996) KID/ASCII Corp (JP)
- Ongaku Tsukūru: Kanadeeru (supports STF mode, plus Satellaview flash cartridges)
- RPG Tsukūru: Super Dante
- RPG Tsukūru 2 (supports STF mode, plus Satellaview mini FLASH cartridges)
- Sound Novel Tsukūru (supports STF mode, plus Satellaview mini FLASH cartridges)
- Tactics Ogre: Let Us Cling Together (1995) (supports both TFII and STF modes)
- Wizardry VI: Bane of the Cosmic Forge (1995) (JP) (English)

== Turbo File GB ==
Turbo File GB is for the Game Boy. It connects via the link cable port. Data is stored on memory cards that connect to the device.

Supported games include:

- RPG Maker GB
- RPG Maker GB 2

== Turbo File Advance ==
Turbo File Advance is for the Game Boy Advance and was sold by Sammy.

Supported games include:

- RPG Tsukuru Advance (max 15 saves)
- Derby Stallion Advance
