= Miracle Piano Teaching System =

The Miracle Piano Teaching System
- Developer: The Software Toolworks
- Publisher: The Software Toolworks
- Designers: Jon Mandel; Henrik Markarian
- Platforms: NES, Super NES, Macintosh, Amiga, Genesis, MS-DOS
- Release: 1990
- Genres: Music, educational
- Mode: Single-player

The Miracle Piano Teaching System is educational software which uses a MIDI keyboard to teach how to play the piano. It was published in 1990 by The Software Toolworks for the Nintendo Entertainment System, Super NES, Macintosh, Amiga, Sega Genesis, and MS-DOS compatible operating systems.

== Description ==
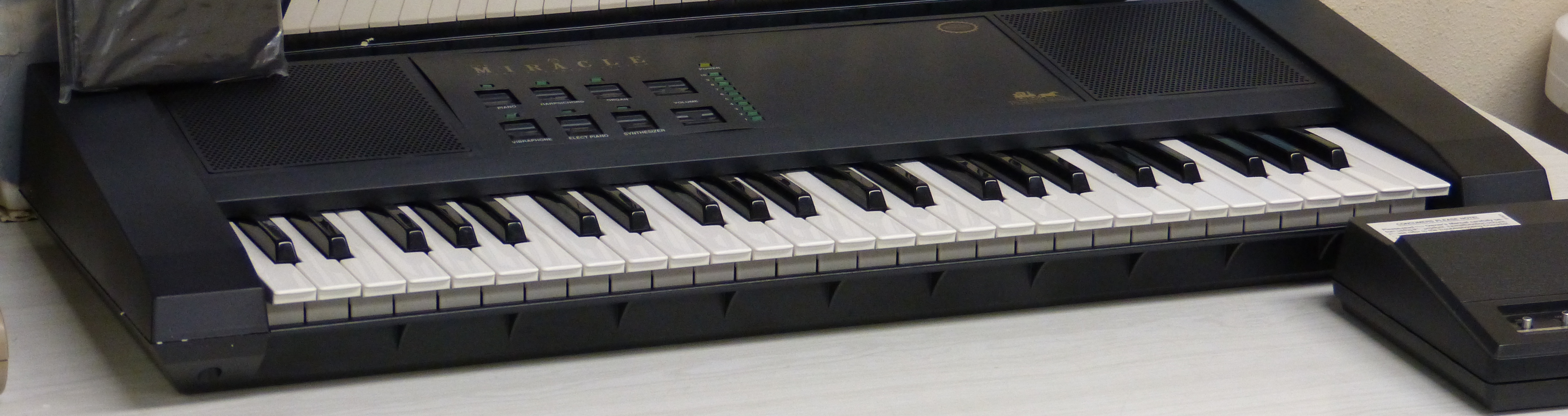
A Miracle system keyboard (NES edition)

The Miracle Piano Teaching System consists of a keyboard, connecting cables, power supply, soft foot pedals, and software. The software comes either on 3.5" floppy disks for personal computers or on cartridges for video game consoles. After the supplied MIDI keyboard is connected to a console or computer and the included software is loaded, a user follows the on-screen notes. Its marketed value is as a tool to teach users to play the piano. It provides hundreds of lessons, and was advertised as the perfect adjunct to formal lessons. It was sold for US$500 and had low sales, in part due to its high price.

It was released in the United States and in multiple regions of Europe. Some of the NES Miracle keyboards were later converted for PC use and the Nintendo Seal of Quality on these boards was covered up with a piece of plastic.

With the exception of the metronome that is used in the Miracle system's lessons, the Miracle system does not ever generate sounds through the video game console hardware. All MIDI information from the console is converted into audio by the instrument's built-in ROM and played through the instrument's stereo speakers, allowing the keyboard to be used independently of the console.

=== Features ===
Game activities in the Miracle system (such as Robo Man, shown here) combine video gaming-type gameplay and practicing of musical skills.

Students can learn to play classic piano, rock piano, or show tunes. The Miracle system assesses the player's ability to create custom lessons. Fun exercises were meant to make learning the piano seem less like a chore and more like playing a video game. Instead of using the traditional NES controller, the piano becomes the controller as players aim at targets in order to perfect their music skills.

There are multiple games that students can play to help teach musical skills. One game is called Robo Man where the player has to press the correct keys at the right time to create a bridge. If they miss, Robo Man falls and the player loses. In the duck hunting game, the player has to press the keys that correspond to the positions of the ducks on a musical staff to shoot them. In the Ripchord game, players must press the correct combination of keys for a chord to land paratroopers onto a target.

== Successors ==
Around 1995, technology from the Miracle system was incorporated into the Piano Discovery System, an interactive PC software application that works with any MIDI keyboard including the Miracle keyboard. By 1997, the Miracle product had been discontinued in favor of the Piano Discovery System.

== Reception ==
Reception

Review score
| Publication | Score |
|---|---|
| Amiga Format | 93% |

The Miracle system failed commercially with its high price of US$299–US$419 (equivalent to US$666–US$934 in 2025, depending on format), but it was overall well received by critics.

Computer Gaming World liked the Miracle system's games and graphics, describing them as "not only entertaining and challenging, but they are also cleverly designed to reinforce the lessons". The magazine concluded, "everything that Software Toolworks promises about this system is true [but] there is still no substitute for parental involvement". David Wesley and Gloria Barczak mentioned that the system was praised by educators and that in 1990 it was the highest-rated third-party NES title by Nintendo's software review team. It was not well-suited to average gamers who lacked musical experience or who were not highly committed and dedicated to undertaking long-term electronic piano learning. PC Magazine mentioned the system as being easy to use and likely more patient than a live piano teacher though the system did not cover certain aspects of piano playing such as hand position. The game was reviewed in the Oppenheim Toy Portfolio Guide Book where the authors described it as "by far the highest use a video-game machine has ever been put to".

NPR personality Noah Adams begins his 1997 memoir Piano Lessons attempting to teach himself how to play through the use of Miracle for PC software, ultimately finding greater success by taking more traditional lessons.

== See also ==
- Synthesia
