= Gamate =

Handheld game console

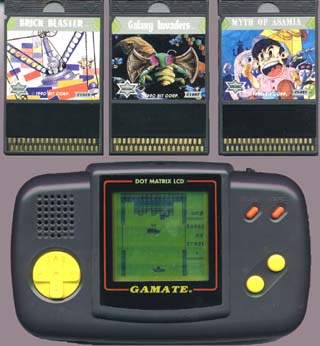
- Gamate and 3 games
- Manufacturer: Bit Corporation; United Microelectronics
- Type: Handheld game console
- Generation: Fourth generation
- Lifespan: 1990–1994
- Media: ROM Card
- CPU: UMC UA6588F (earlier revision); NCR 81489 (later revision) both 6502 based
- Memory: 16KB RAM
- Display: LCD in 4 greyscale
- Graphics: 160 x 152 pixels
- Sound: AY-3-8910 mono internal speaker
- Power: 6V, four AA batteries
- Dimensions: 16.7 × 9.7 × 3.3 cm (6.58 × 3.82 × 1.3 inches)

The Gamate, known as 超級小子 (pinyin: chāojí xiǎozi, literally "Super Boy") in Taiwan and 超级神童 (pinyin: chāojí shéntóng, literally "Super Child Prodigy") in China, is a handheld game console manufactured by Bit Corporation in the early 1990s, and released in Australia, some parts of Europe, Asia (Taiwan and China), Argentina, and the United States.

The only emulator that supports it is MAME, with games also playable on a MiSTer. 61 games are known to have been released for the system, but additional ones may have been produced.

== History ==
The Gamate was first of the many handheld consoles released following Nintendo's Game Boy.

UK magazine advert

It was originally released by the Taiwanese game company Bit Corporation in conjunction with local distributors around the world, such as Alston Research in the USA, the joystick maker Cheetah Marketing in the UK, toy company GIG in Italy, video game importer Uranium in Switzerland, Greek Software in Greece, ITMC subsidiary Yeno in Germany, Famiclone manufacturer Electrolab in Argentina and PlayMix in Sweden.

Bit Corp. ceased operating in 1992 but UMC and its subsidiary Funtech continued to produce Gamate hardware and software.

== Hardware ==
Unlike other Taiwanese or Hong Kong Game Boy competitors, such as the Watara Supervision, Hartung Game Master and the Mega Duck, the Gamate's internal hardware contains no epoxy covered chips and was assembled in a quality manner. The build quality is relatively akin to that of the Game Boy. The shell is made of thick plastic and with batteries installed, the unit feels very similar to the weight of a Game Boy.

=== Screen ===
The screen on the Gamate is very similar to the Game Boy. It is a greenish color, with manual contrast adjustment, and non-backlit. Backlit screens were not common in 1990. Moving objects appear blurry and faint - the quality known as "ghosting" - which can make game play very frustrating.

The Gamate seems, however, to have had two different types of LCD screen used throughout its lifespan. The easiest way to tell which type one has is by turning the Gamate on without a game in - the "bad" one displays vertical lines while the "good" one displays a slightly corrupted checkerboard pattern.

=== Sound ===
The Gamate internally uses an AY-3-8910 sound chip that can generate 3 channels of square waves and one for noise. The Gamate's mono internal speaker is of poor quality, giving off sound that is quite distorted, particularly at low volumes. However, if a user plugs into the headphone jack, some of the sound channels are mapped to the headphone's left/right channels that forms stereo audio, and the output is of a relatively high quality.

=== Shell ===
The original Gamate is dark grey in color and has a "x" D-pad and small speaker vents and produces the full game stereo soundtrack through the monaural speaker. The later Gamate are dark grey in color and have a "+" D-pad design and large speaker vents and have louder volume output but output only a single mono track through the console's mono speaker and requires headphones for the entire L/R audio tracks to be heard.

A variant in the latter design, with a white shell and red buttons also exists.

=== Serial numbers ===
All Gamates have a seven digit serial number near the card port on the rear of the console. The first two digits represent the year of manufacture, while the last five represent the unit's chronology. Therefore, a unit with the number "9001687", was the 1687th produced in 1990. The newest unit thus far discovered was produced in 1993.

=== Specifications ===
- CPU UMC UA6588F (earlier revision); NCR 81489, 8 bits (BIT WS39323F) in a QFP-100 shell (later revision)
- ROM 2 KB (UM6116M-2L CMOS static RAM, pin compatible with ROM/EPROM chips)
- RAM 16 KB (2 × CXK5864M-15L chips) of static RAM
- Case: Grey plastic
- Keys D-pad, A, B, START and SELECT
- Sound General Instrument AY-3-8910, output via either internal mono speaker or external stereo headphones
- Media ROM card, very similar to HuCard (PC Engine), My Card (SG-1000) and Sega Card (Master System) 19×2 pins
- Input/Output
  - Cartridge Slot
  - Stereo headphones
  - Power
  - External link connector (for 2-player games)

=== Expansion ===
- Gamate link cable
- Ni-CD battery pack

== Games ==
Snowman Legend

Tornado

Treasure Hunter

Screenshots from three Gamate games

Games cartridges for the Gamate are slim plastic cards with exposed pins, similar to PC Engine or Master System cards. Within the large illustrations are the game title and, unlike most systems, a simple numerical designation (C1-001, C1-002, etc.), making organization reasonably simple for collectors. The exact number of games released remains unknown. Some articles regarding the Gamate state it has "about 35 games or so", but the true number may be closer to 70. One contributing factor to this ambiguity is that as Bit Corp. had passed into bankruptcy, games continued to be published by UMC, but very few left the Asian market.

Many titles are clones of popular games from the era (Tetris, Bomberman, Lode Runner, Battle City, etc.). Bit Corp. (and later UMC) is given sole credit within each game, but inconsistencies in game content and labeling make it far more likely that several developers were involved in designing individual games; two external developers are currently known, Gamtec and Hengmao Electronics. Some titles suffer from assorted bugs. A few titles seem to be original concepts, and a great many more remain mysterious due to their scarcity.

While in general the higher-numbered games were released later and in smaller quantities, there seems to be little correlation with this principle prior to the C1-040's, with random numbers inexplicably difficult to find.

=== Game list (incomplete) ===
Serial number	Title	AKA title(s)	Developer	Release year
C1-001	Cube-Up		Bit Corp.	1990
C1-002	Witty Apee		Bit Corp.	1991
C1-003	Box Forum		Bit Corp.	1991
C1-004	Mighty Tank		Bit Corp.	1990
C1-005	Enchanted Bricks		Bit Corp.	1990
C1-006	Mini Golf		Bit Corp.	1990
C1-007	Galaxy Invaders		Bit Corp.	1990
C1-008	Legend of Dragon Knight		Bit Corp.	1991
C1-009	Tornado		Bit Corp.	1991
C1-010	Bump N' Run			
C1-011	Money Maze		Bit Corp.	1990
C1-012	Pharaoh Revenger		Bit Corp.	1991
C1-013	Dino Bibo		Bit Corp.	1991
C1-014	Time Warrior		Bit Corp.	1990
C1-015	Kill Shot		Bit Corp.	1991
C1-016	Volcano Panic		Bit Corp.	1991
C1-017	Devil Castle		Bit Corp.	1991
C1-018	Kung-Fu Fighter		Bit Corp.	1990
C1-019	Dino Ball		Bit Corp.	1991
C1-020	Bad Bud Chou Chu's Adventure			
C1-021	Myth of Asamia		Bit Corp.	1990
C1-022	Pipemania		Bit Corp.	1991
C1-023	Tennis		Bit Corp.	1991
C1-024	Marauder		Bit Corp.	1991
C1-025	Jackpot			
C1-026	Flipuzzle		Bit Corp.	1991
C1-027	Monster Pitfall		Bit Corp.	1990
C1-028	Vindicators		Bit Corp.	1990
C1-029	Brick Blaster		Bit Corp.	1990
C1-030	Beach Volleyball			
C1-031	Bomb Blaster	Bomb Blast	Bit Corp.	1990
C1-032	Cosmic Fighter		Bit Corp.	1990
C1-033	Fist of Thunder		Bit Corp.	1991
C1-034	Superboy			
C1-035	Treasure Hunter		Bit Corp.	1990
C1-036	Jewelriss		Bit Corp.	1991
C1-037	Nightmare of Santa Claus		Bit Corp.	1991
C1-038	Mars Voyage		Bit Corp.	1991
C1-039	(unknown title, possibly unreleased)			
C1-040	(unknown title, possibly unreleased)			
C1-041	Mighty Boxer			
C1-042	Flying Goblin		Bit Corp.	1991
C1-043	Boom!		Bit Corp.	1991
C1-044	Snowman Legend		Bit Corp.	1991
C1-045	World Cup Soccer			
C1-046	Kiki Inland	Kiki Island	Bit Corp.	1992
C1-047	Fortune 'n Luck	Fortune and Luck	Bit Corp.	1992
C1-048	Baseball	Super Baseball	Bit Corp.	1992
C1-049	Punk Boy		Bit Corp.	1992
C1-050	Fortress of Fierceness		Bit Corp.	1991
C1-051	Incantational Couple		Bit Corp.	1992
C1-052	Famous	1) 7 Famous; 2) Famous 7	UMC	1993
C1-053	Metamorphosiser	Tough Guy	UMC	1993
C1-054	Magic Jigsaw		Bit Corp.	1991
C1-055	(unknown title, possibly unreleased)			
C1-056	GP Race		Bit Corp.	1992
C1-057	Fantasy Travel		UMC	1993
C1-058	Heaven Clash	QuizFighter	UMC	1993
C1-059	(unknown title, possibly unreleased)			
C1-060	Further Adventures of Hannibal The Cat			1993
C1-061	Dinosaur Park		Phinnex Co., Ltd.	1993
C1-062	(unknown title, possibly unreleased)			
C1-063	Basketball			
C1-064	Bao Qing Tian	The Legendary Judge		1994
C1-065	Hot Hero	Huǒbào Yīngxióng		1994
C1-066	(unknown title, possibly unreleased)			
C1-067	Robin Hood		Phinnex Co., Ltd.	1994
C1-068	The Golden Pyramid			1995
C1-069	Riddle of the Ancient Tomb	Bǎozàng Zhī Mí		1994
C1-070	Insect War		UMC	1995
C1-401	4-in-1 (Mini Golf, Cube-Up, Brick Blaster, and Vindicators)		Bit Corp.	1991
K1-001	One Million Whys	Lǜyě Mí Zōng	UMC	1993
