= Gamtec =

Taiwanese video game developer

Gamtec Corporation 三協資訊股份有限公司
- Type: Private
- Industry: Video games
- Founded: June 1989
- Headquarters: Taichung, Taiwan
- Number of employees: 12 (2009)

Gamtec (Chinese: 三協資訊; pinyin: Sān Xié Zīxùn) is a Taiwanese video game developer established in June 1989 and based in Taichung City, Taiwan noted for its unlicensed Sega Mega Drive games such as Legend of Wukong and Squirrel King. Its motto is: Believe in yourself (Chinese: 相信自己; pinyin: Xiāngxìn Zìjǐ).

The company also developed a number of NES and PC games, and claims to have developed for the Gamate, Super A'Can, Arcade, SNES, Game Boy, Game Boy Color and Game Boy Advance, although it often acted as a contract developer for other companies so is frequently not credited in games it worked on.

== Games ==
Games in this list, unless otherwise specified, are those that explicitly credit Gamtec. Because the company is a contract developer, it may have helped develop other titles in which its name does not appear, such as those for the Bit Corporation Gamate handheld system.

=== Nintendo Entertainment System ===
- Fire Dragon [AKA Huǒlóng]
- King Tank [AKA Taan Hak Fung Wan] (1993)
- Thunderbolt II [AKA Léi Diān II - Thunderbolt Fighting Plane] (1993)
- The Universe Soldiers (1993)
- Wisdom Boy (co-developed with Sun Team)

=== Bit Corporation Gamate ===
- Cosmic Fighter
- Fantasy Travel
- Metamorphosiser [AKA Tough Guy]

=== Sega Mega Drive ===
- 16 Tile Mahjong [AKA 16 Zhang Mahjong (Shíliù Zhāng Májiàng)]
- 16 Tile Mahjong II [AKA 16 Zhang Mahjong II (Shíliù Zhāng Májiàng II)]
- Adventurous Boy [AKA Adventure Kid (Màoxiǎn Xiǎozi)]
- Bomboy [AKA Explosion Kid (Bàozhà Xiǎozi)] (1993)
- Chāojí Dà Fùwēng
- Legend of Wukong [AKA Wukong Rumors (Wùkōng Wàizhuàn)] (1996; 2008: English version developed by Super Fighter Team)
- The Lion King 2 [AKA Shīziwáng II]
- Magic 7 Block [AKA Variety Tangram (Bǎi Biàn Qīqiǎobǎn)]
- Magic Girl [AKA Little Witch (Xiǎo Mónǚ)] (1993)
- Mènghuàn Shuǐguǒ Pán: 777 Casino
- Sonic Jam 6 (AKA Super Mario 2 1998)
- Squirrel King (1995)
- Super Bubble Bobble MD
- Super Donkey Kong 99 [AKA Super King Kong 99] (1999)
- Super Magican [sic] [AKA Elf Wor, and Spiritual Magic Priest (Líng Huàn Dàoshi)]
- Super Tank War
- Thunderbolt II [AKA Léi Diān II - Thunderbolt Fighting Plane] (1995)
- Tiny Toon Adventures 3 (1996)

Note: The Mega Drive title The Lion King 2 is credited as Lion King II on title screen.

==== Accessories ====
- Magicard cheat cartridge

== See also ==
- Thin Chen Enterprise - another Taiwanese console game developer
- Bit Corp
