= Crystal Mines II =

1992 video game

- Developer: Color Dreams
- Publisher: Atari Corporation
- Designer: Ken Beckett
- Platform: Atari Lynx
- Release: 1992
- Genre: Puzzle
- Mode: Single-player

Crystal Mines II is a puzzle video game developed by Color Dreams and published by Atari Corporation in 1992 for the Atari Lynx handheld console. The game is a sequel to Crystal Mines for the Nintendo Entertainment System. Both releases are similar to Boulder Dash, a genre which has since become known as "rocks and diamonds" games.

== Gameplay ==
Gameplay screenshot

The player guides a robot down a series of mines to collect crystals of different colors (and worth different point values). Along the way, the robot encounters wooden blocks, which can be blown up or sawed through, boulders of different types, dirt, which can be shot away with the robot's blaster, and a variety of monsters. The robot can also discover shields, radioactivity protection, deposits of copper, silver and gold, and caches of TNT. The metal deposits become bonuses to the player's score, while the other items can be used to complete various levels of the game.

== Release ==
In 2000, Songbird Productions produced a sequel, Crystal Mines II: Buried Treasure on CD-ROM for Microsoft Windows. This CD-ROM requires the original game and a Lynx-to-PC serial cable to run, allowing the editing and creation of all new levels. This was followed in 2003 by a cartridge release of Crystal Mines II: Buried Treasure with the original 181 levels and 125 new levels.

In 2010, Home Entertainment Suppliers released ports of Crystal Mines II for the Nintendo DS, PlayStation Portable and iPhone under the title Crystal Mines.

In 2020, Crystal Mines II was re-released for the Evercade as part of the Atari Lynx Collection 1 cartridge. It includes extra levels which were not part of the original Lynx cartridge.

== Reception ==
Reception

Review scores
Publication	Score
AllGame	2.5/5
Consoles +	91%
Electronic Gaming Monthly	6/10, 5/10, 7/10, 8/10
Génération 4	82%
IGN	7/10
Joypad	79%
Joystick	88%
Mega Fun	78/100
Retro Gamer	69%
ST Format	83%
Video Games (DE)	68%
The Atari Times	75%
Game Zone	78/100
Go! Hand-Held Video Games	83/100
Play Time	37%

Crystal Mines II garnered generally favorable reviews from critics.
