= Colorful Dragon =

1989 Nintendo Entertainment System game

- North American cover art
- Developer: Sachen
- Publishers: AS: Sachen; NA: Bunch Games
- Director: Rolland Cheng
- Designers: Wun Zu-Tsie; Hau Yu-Tsao; Min Fa-Tyei; Chieh Che-Chao
- Programmer: Rolland Cheng
- Composer: Rolland Cheng
- Platform: NES
- Release: AS: 1989; NA: 1990
- Genre: Maze
- Modes: Single-player, multiplayer

Colorful Dragon (Chinese: 變色龍; pinyin: Biànsèlóng; lit. 'Chameleon'), is a maze video game developed and published by Sachen for the Nintendo Entertainment System on 1989 in Asia. Bunch Games later licensed the game for distribution in North America for a 1990 release, and published it as Tagin' Dragon.

The game was not licensed by Nintendo. Sachen republished Colorful Dragon in the multi-game cartridge Super Cartridge Version 6: 6-in-1.

== Gameplay ==
The player controls a dragon in a maze, attempting to bite the tails off other dragons. The longer a dragon's tail, the more bites required to defeat it. There are a total 20 mazes.

Two players may play either competitively or cooperatively.

== Reception ==
Reception

Review score
Publication	Score
Top Secret	3/5

A review in Polish magazine Top Secret thought that both the graphics and music average, but that the increase in challenge in later levels put it slightly above other arcade style games.
