= Silent Assault =

1989 video game

- North American cover art
- Developer: Joy Van
- Publishers: AS: Sachen; AU: HES Interactive; NA: Color Dreams; BR: Milmar
- Platform: Nintendo Entertainment System
- Release: AS: 1989; NA: 1990
- Genre: Platform
- Mode: Single-player

Silent Assault, also known as Raid, is an unlicensed game created for the NES by Joy Van and published by Color Dreams. Players control the only human who was unaffected by an alien power, as the Earth's military forces are under control from the deadly alien force.

== Gameplay ==
Developed by Joy Van/Sachen and published by Color Dreams in NA and Sachen in AS. The player is the only one who is not affected by an alien power has taken over Earth's military forces. The player obtains different weapons, which drop down from the sky throughout each level, as you confront enemies. The game contains a total of eight levels which include a military base, a forest, an amusement park, and a few other places. With a boss at the end of every stage.

The player begins each game with three lives and a health meter represented by three small shields displayed on the upper left corner of the screen. When the player comes in contact with an enemy or an enemy's projectile, half a shield is lost. Health can be recovered by collecting hearts that appear randomly when you defeat enemies. (And for some reason, whenever you kill something, it turns into a bat).

== Reception ==
A writer of French magazine Joystick, scoring Silent Assault an 81%, called it an "excellent platform game", praising its challenge and varied level design. His only criticism was the "jerky" movement of the character being controlled. On the other hand, Aktueller Software Markt was very harsh towards the game, criticizing its presentation, ridiculously easy-to-defeat enemies and bosses, and bad storyline. Ultimate Nintendo, according to Moby Games, gave a 10% score, recommending it "only if you’re looking to laugh and/or scratch your head".

== See also ==
- List of Nintendo Entertainment System games
- Color Dreams
