= Moon Ranger =

1990 video game

- Developer: Odyssey Software
- Publisher: Bunch Games
- Designers: Art Cestaro III; George Rucker III
- Artist: Steve Tilton
- Composers: Mike Smith; George Rucker III
- Platform: Nintendo Entertainment System
- Release: NA: 1990
- Genre: Action
- Mode: Single-player

Moon Ranger is an action video game that was developed by Odyssey Software and published by Bunch Games. The player must fly through outer space, destroying meteors and aliens along the way.

== Reception ==
Game Player's Encyclopedia of Nintendo Games said: "Moon Ranger's graphics and gameplay don't break new ground, and it offers little to set it apart from other arcade-action titles."
