= Mega Duck =

Handheld game console

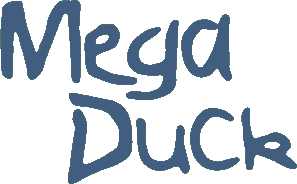

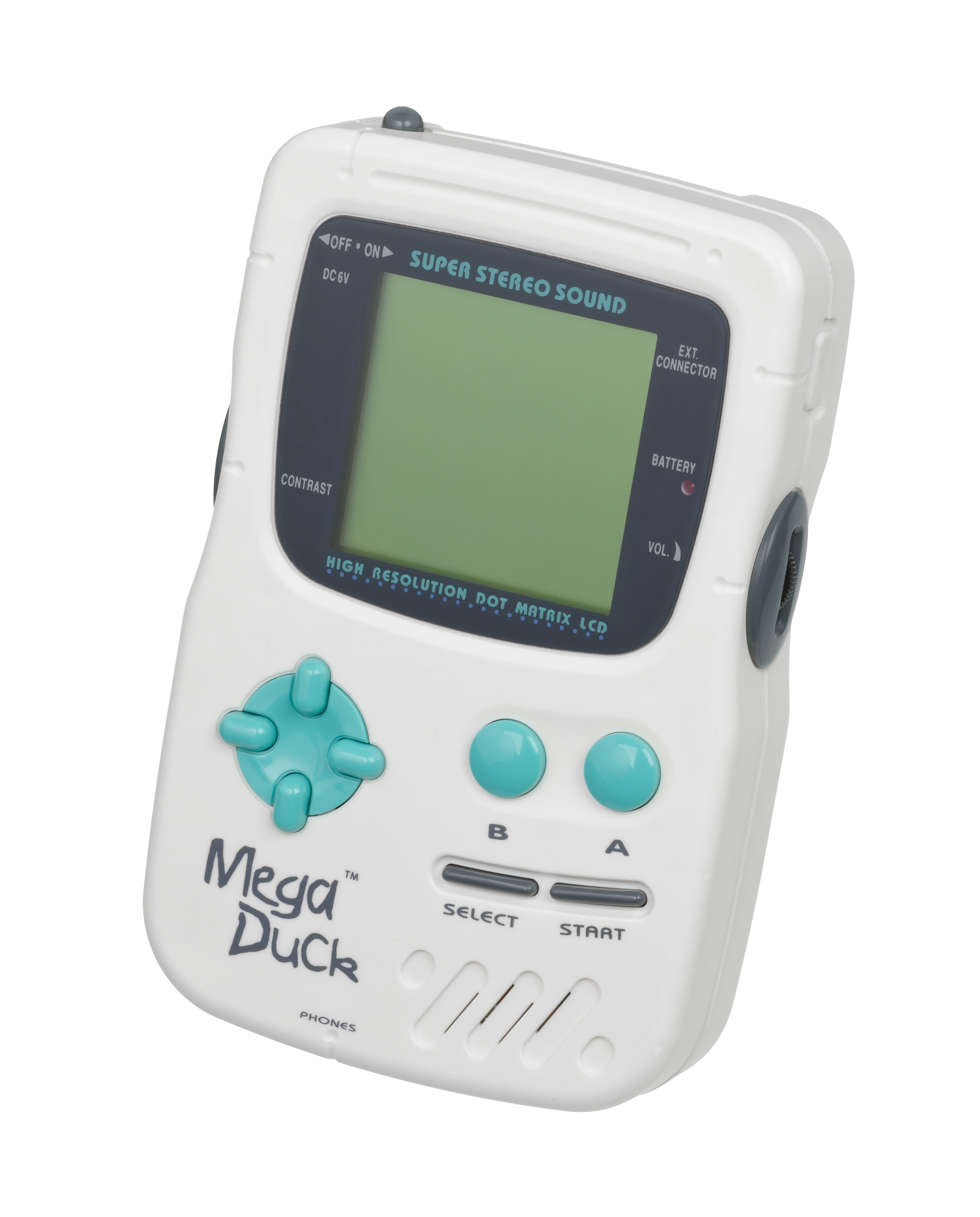
- The Mega Duck console
- Also known as: Cougar Boy
- Manufacturer: Welback Holdings
- Type: Handheld video game console
- Released: 1993; 33 years ago
- Introductory price: fl 129 (Netherlands)
- System on a chip: Sharp LR35902
- CPU: Sharp SM83 @ 4.194304 MHz
- Memory: 16 KB RAM (Goldstar GM76C88LFW)
- Graphics: 160×144 pixels
- Sound: Built in speaker
- Controller input: 4 directional keys, A, B, Select and Start keys
- Power: Four AA batteries or AC adapter 6VDC/300mA
- Weight: 249 g (w/o batteries)

The Mega Duck WG-108 (also known as Cougar Boy) is a handheld game console that was developed and manufactured by Hong Kong–based Welback Holdings through its Timlex International division, and released in 1993.

It was marketed under various different brands worldwide including Creatronic and Videojet, and the shell of the console came in white or black plastic. It was sold for about fl 129 in the Netherlands, and for a similar price in France and Germany.

In South America (mainly in Brazil), the Chinese-made Creatronic version was distributed by Cougar USA, also known as "Cougar Electronic Organization", and sold as the "Cougar Boy". Cougar USA didn't widely release the Cougar Boy in its origin country.

The cartridges are very similar to those of the Watara Supervision, but slightly narrower with fewer contacts (36 pins, whereas Supervision cartridges have 40). But unlike the Supervision, the hardware of the Mega Duck is almost identical to that of the Game Boy, enabling easy ports between the two systems.

The Cougar Boy came with a four-in-one game cartridge and a stereo earphone.

== Laptop Models ==
A variant in the form of an educational laptop for children was released in Germany by Hartung as the Mega Duck Super Junior Computer, and in Spain by CEFA Toys as the Super QuiQue. It uses an external game pad tethered by a cable instead of an integrated one. There is a primary ROM cartridge slot and a secondary slot for a battery backed save RAM cartridge. An extra accessory called the Mega Duck Printer was also released for this variant.

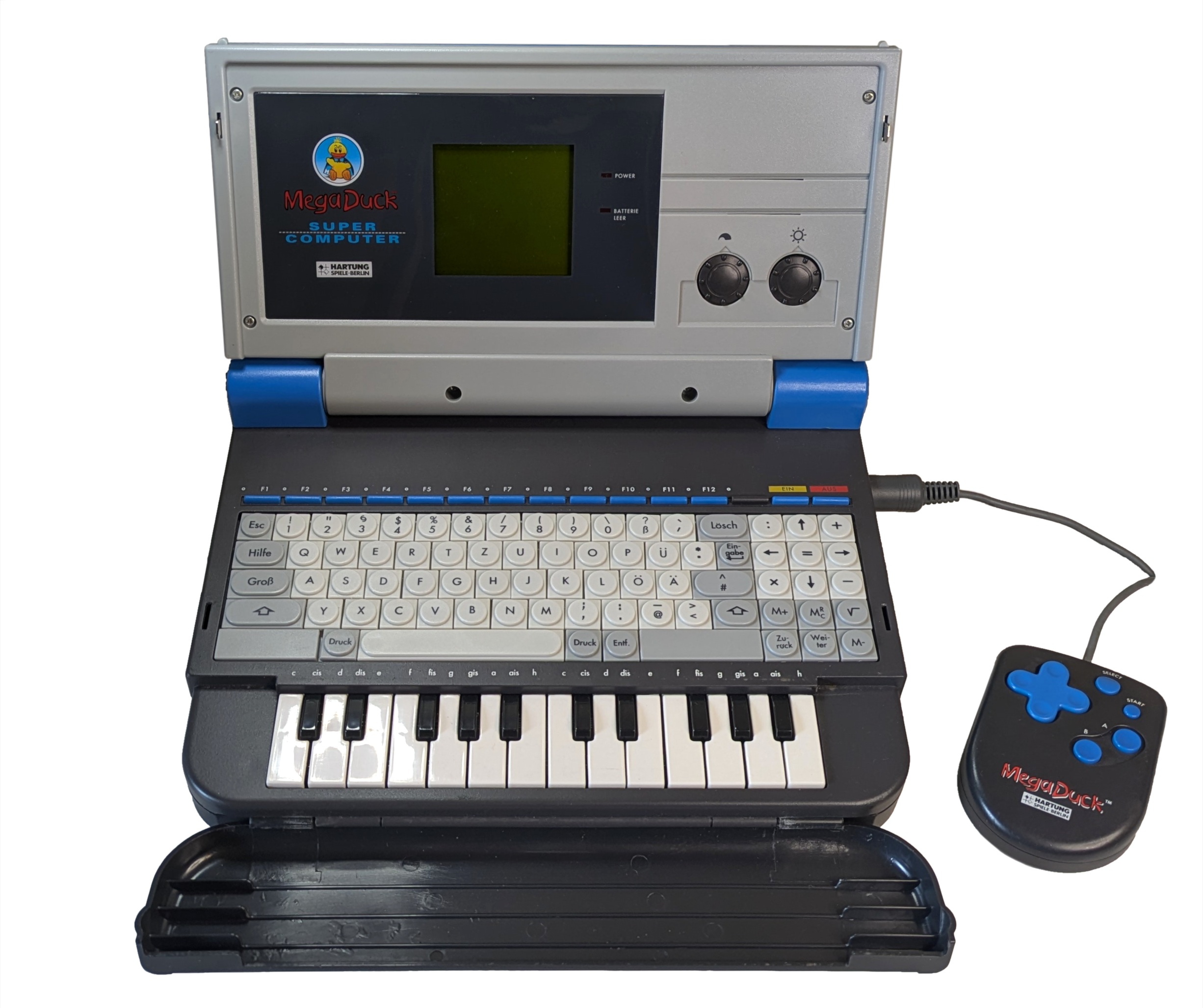
Megaduck Laptop German Model

== Technical specifications ==
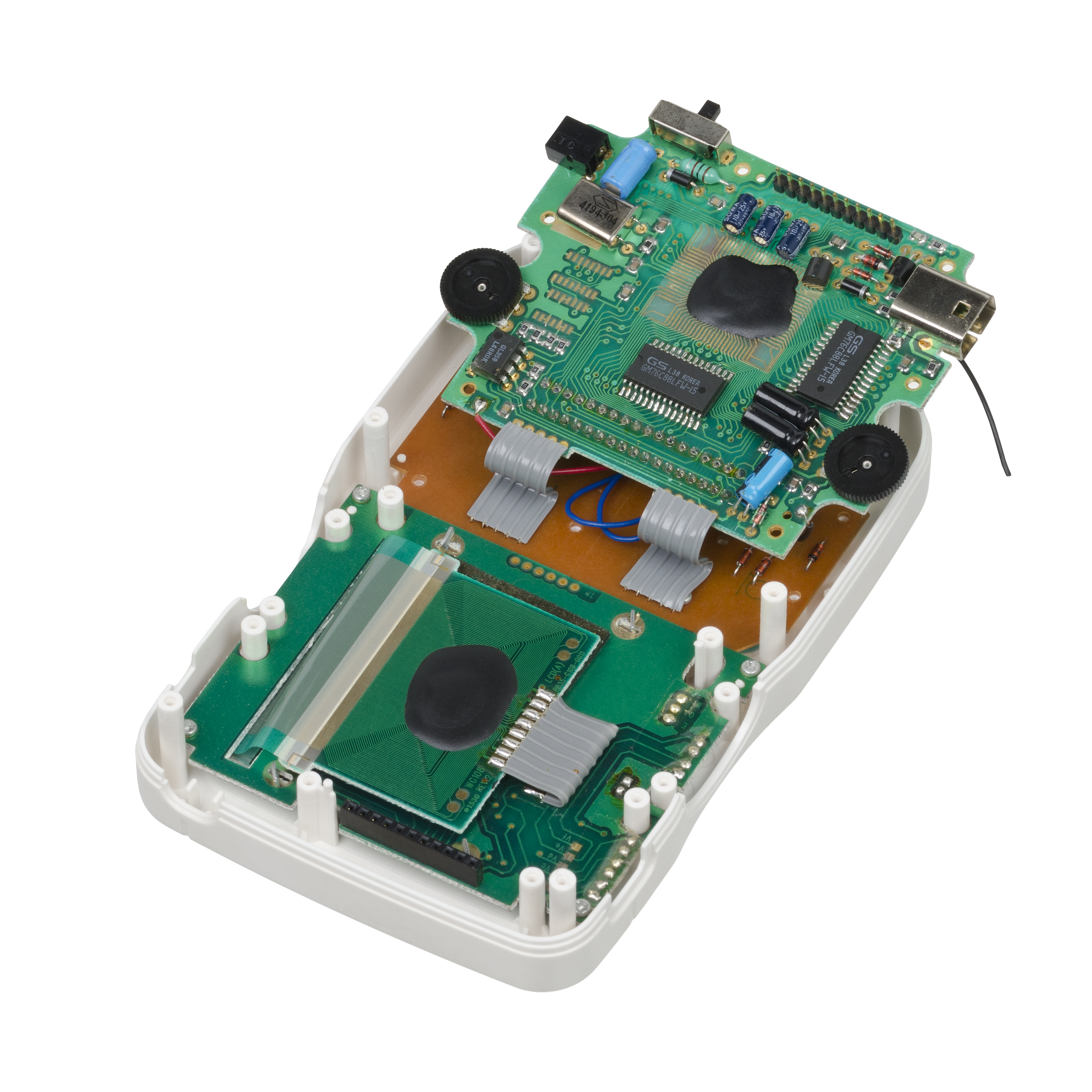
The Mega Duck open

The Mega Duck features a multi board design, separating the motherboard, LCD, and controller PCB into three different assemblies. The battery compartment is found on the back casing, being the contacts connected by wires and soldered onto the main board.

- CPU: Sharp SM83 (Z80-like, embedded in the LR35902 System on a chip) @ 4.194304 MHz
- RAM: 16 KB in two 8K chips (Goldstar GM76C88LFW)
- LCD: 2.7" (48 (h) × 51 (w) mm) STN dot matrix. resolution 160×144 at 59.732155 Hz
- Colours: 4 levels of dark blue on a green background
- Player controls: 4 directional keys, A, B, Select and Start keys
- Other controls: On/off switch, contrast and volume dials
- Sound: 4 channels (2 pulse wave, 1 wavetable and 1 noise) with built-in speaker (8Ω 200 mW) and stereo headset output
- Dimensions: 155 by 97 by 32 millimetres (6.1 in × 3.8 in × 1.3 in)
- Weight: 249 g (w/o batteries)
- Power: Four AA batteries or AC adapter 6 VDC / 300 mA
- Current consumption: 700 mW
- Play duration: 15 hours on one set of four AA batteries
- Expansion Interface: Serial link for two player games (6 pins), or external joystick.
- Game medium: 36 pins ROM cartridge, 63 (l) × 54 (w) mm and 7 mm thick, 17 gram.

== List of games ==
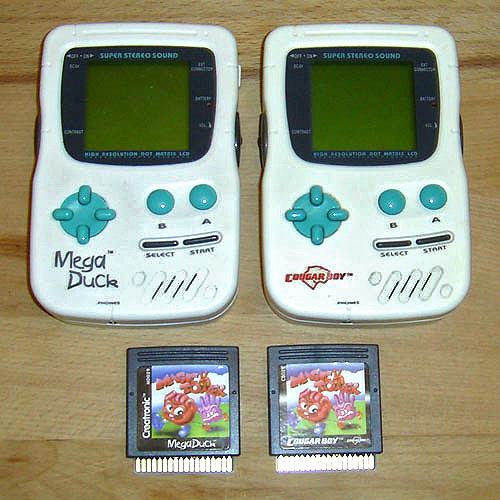
The Mega Duck and Cougar Boy with identical games for both systems

This is an (incomplete) list of Mega Duck/Cougar Boy games. Each Mega Duck/Cougar Boy game is similarly labelled as the same games were marketed for both systems, although not all games were released for the Cougar Boy. The notation MDxxx is used for Mega Duck Games, and the notation CBxxx for a Cougar Boy Games. A MD002 is exactly the same game as the CB002, even to a point that some "Cougar Boy" games start up with a Mega Duck logo. Some notation numbers go unused, going up to 037, but missing 012 and 023 for example.

With the exception of the pack-in game for the Mega Duck (The Brick Wall) which was developed by the manufacturer, all games were developed by Thin Chen Enterprise under the "Sachen" and "Commin" brand names, and were later re-released for the Game Boy in 4-in-1 and 8-in-1 cartridges without the license from Nintendo.

Although 24 cartridges (not counting Cougar Boy variants or add-ons for the Super Junior Computer) are known to exist, another game is listed on various websites called Tip & Tap, however, it is not known if the game was ever released, or if it existed at all.

Background shading indicates games that have a Cougar Boy variant.
# followed by a/b/c/d/e indicates included games in # cartridge.

#	Title	Developer	Release year	Notes
001	The Brick Wall	Timlex International	1993	
002	Street Rider	Commin	1993	Rally-X clone
003	Bomb Disposer	Commin	1993	Dr. Mario clone
004	Vex	Commin	1993	KLAX clone
005	Suleiman's Treasure	Commin	1993	Anteater clone
006	Arctic Zone	Commin	1993	A horizontal Quarth clone
007	Magic Maze	Commin	1993	Also released as Dancing Block on NES and Watara Supervision
008	Puppet Knight	Commin	1993	Bomberman clone
009	Trap and Turn	Commin	1993	Reversi game
010	Pile Wonder	Commin	1993	Sokoban clone
011	Captain Knick Knack	Sachen	1993	Vertical shoot-em-up similar to TwinBee
013	Black Forest tale	Commin	1993	Similar to Sachen's earlier Little Red Hood game
014	Armour Force	Commin	1993	Horizontal shoot-em-up
018	Snake Roy	Sachen	1993	A Snake variant
019	Railway	Sachen	1993	Pipe Mania clone
021	Beast Fighter	Sachen	1993	Side-scrolling beat-em-up
026	Ant Soldiers	Sachen	1993	Lemmings clone
028	2nd Space	Sachen	1993	A game similar to Pac-Man
029	Magic Tower	Sachen	1993	A platforming game with a Rock paper scissors element
030	Worm Visitor	Sachen	1993	Frogger clone
031	Duck Adventures	Commin	1993	Wani Wani World clone
035	Four in One	Sachen	1993	Compilation of 4 games: Virus Attack, Electron World, Trouble Zone, Dice Block
035a	Virus Attack	Sachen	1993	Space Invaders clone
035b	Electron World	Sachen	1993	Maze action game
035c	Trouble Zone	Sachen	1993	Puzzle game
035d	Dice Block	Sachen	1993	QBillion clone
036	Commin Five in one	Commin	1993	Compilation of 5 games: Store Tris 1 and 2, Taiwan Mahjong, Japan Mahjong, Hong Kong Mahjong
036a	Store Tris 1	Commin	1993	Tetris clone
036b	Store Tris 2	Commin	1993	Tetris variant with irregular shapes
036c	Taiwan Mahjong	Commin	1993	
036d	Japan Mahjong	Commin	1993	
036e	Hong Kong Mahjung	Commin	1993	
037	Zipball	Sachen	1993	Action puzzle game
