= King Neptune's Adventure =

1990 video game

- Developer: Color Dreams
- Publisher: Color Dreams
- Platform: Nintendo Entertainment System
- Release: NA: 1990
- Genre: Action game
- Mode: Single player

King Neptune's Adventure is an unlicensed sidescroller action game created for the Nintendo Entertainment System that was released in 1990 by Color Dreams. Players play as King Neptune, as they venture through ships, oceans and Atlantis.

== Gameplay ==
Eight of King Neptune's treasures have been stolen over the years, including his most powerful one, the magical Orb of Peace. Those under the sea are worried, as peace is at risk. Players, as King Neptune, must return the Orb of Peace to King Neptune's castle and restore peace to his oceanic kingdom. King Neptune is armed with "bolts of goodness", as well as bubble bombs. Players collect health and bombs by destroying enemies. The 8 treasures can be recovered by beating bosses or with the help of the dolphins.

== Cartridge ==
Most of the game cartridges came in a baby blue color, but like most other Color Dreams games it also came in black, the black variant being more uncommon than the baby blue variant.

== Other versions ==
There is a French translated version of King Neptune's Adventure.

== See also ==
- List of Nintendo Entertainment System games
