= Bobby Is Going Home =

1983 video game

- Developer: Bit Corporation
- Publishers: Bit Corporation (US/EU); CCE (Brazil)
- Platform: Atari 2600
- Release: EU: 1983; US: 1983; BR: 1983
- Genre: Platform
- Mode: Single-player

Bobby Is Going Home is a platform game released for the Atari 2600 console in 1983.

== Gameplay ==
Gameplay screenshot

The player controls a boy named Bobby who has to pass through seven screens, jump over ponds, broken bridges, animals like hawks, butterflies, bats, ducks and other obstacles. The gameplay resembles Pitfall!, a game released by Activision.

After the player passes seven scenes, he then can get Bobby into the house, and there the next level will show. The game has 32 levels. Hitting reset and select change the style of flowers that show at the bottom of the screen.
