= Bit Corporation =

Taiwanese game developer and console manufacturer

- Native name: 普澤有限公司
- Type: Private
- Industry: Video games
- Founded: June 14, 1980; 46 years ago
- Defunct: 1992
- Fate: Out of business
- Headquarters: Taipei, Taiwan

Bit Corporation (Chinese: 普澤; pinyin: Pǔzé) was a Taiwanese game developer and console manufacturer.

== Games ==
Bit Corporation produced original software for the Atari 2600 and ColecoVision, which it released worldwide under both its own name and the Puzzy brand, as well as being distributed by Zimag. These games included such titles as Bobby Is Going Home, Snail Against Squirrel, Mr. Postman and Open, Sesame!, which was one of only two games for the system to feature speech synthesis. The company also produced games for the NES and Famicom including Duck, Othello, Jackpot and Crime Busters; all but the Crime Busters were released in Australia by HES Interactive, while Crime Busters was released in Brazil by Gradiente.

=== List of Atari 2600 games ===
- Open, Sesame! (1982)
- Bobby Is Going Home (1983)
- Dancing Plate (1983)
- Mission 3000 A.D. (1983)
- Mr. Postman (1983)
- Phantom Tank (1983)
- Sea Monster (1983)
- Snail Against Squirrel (1983)
- Space Robot (1983)
- Space Tunnel (1983)
- Phantom UFO (198?)

=== List of ColecoVision games ===
- Cosmic Crisis (1983, also released by Telegames)
- Meteoric Shower (1983)
- Strike It! (1983, only released by Telegames)
- Tank Wars (1983, only released by Telegames)

=== List of NES/Famicom games ===
- Duck (1987; published by HES Interactive in 1990 as Duck Maze)
- Othello (1988)
- Shèng Héng Pào [AKA Twin Loud Cannon] (1988)
- Shuǐguǒ Lí [AKA Jackpot] (1988)
- Crime Busters (1989)

The NES/Famicom game Diàn Shì Mǎ Lì is also credited as Lì Mǎ Shì Diàn on the title screen.

== Hardware ==
The majority of the consoles manufactured by Bit Corporation were clones of existing systems, such as the Famicom, Atari 2600 and Sega SG-1000. The company also produced two computers, the Bit-60 and Bit-90, which were based on 2600 and ColecoVision hardware respectively and compatible with each console's cartridges. The Bit-70 was a Famicom clone featuring a top cartridge slot compatible with both Japanese Famicom cartridges and US market NES cartridges (with an adapter). It was one of the only video game consoles, and the only famiclone, sold in the USSR.

== Gamate ==
Bit was also involved in the Gamate, the first original Taiwanese handheld game console; its name appears on all games' title screens and both the system and console packaging. However, recent developments suggest that two other companies, Dunhuang Technology (a now-defunct subsidiary of UMC) and Gamtec, were also somehow involved in the hardware and software respectively. This was, however, to be Bit Corp's last venture, as in 1992 the company closed citing "operational difficulties".

== See also ==
- List of companies of Taiwan
