= Master Chu and the Drunkard Hu =

1989 video game

- North American cover art
- Developer: Joy Van
- Publishers: AS: Sachen; NA: Color Dreams; BR: Milmar
- Composer: Lóngzhōng Yè
- Platform: NES
- Release: AS: 1989; NA: 1989
- Genre: Platformer
- Modes: Single-player, multiplayer

Master Chu and the Drunkard Hu (Chinese: 盜帥楚留香; pinyin: Dào Shuài Chu Liúxiāng; lit. 'Chu Liuxiang: Bandit Chief'), is a platform video game released in Asia for the NES by Joy Van in 1989, and was published in the same year by Color Dreams for the North American release. This game was not officially licensed by Nintendo and was manufactured using either non-standard light blue or black cartridges, typical of all games published by Color Dreams.

== Story ==
The game's title screen

The player plays as Master Chu. The Hindu god Shiva has cursed the village where Chu resides. Chu's friend Master Hu has failed to stop Shiva and has resorted to drinking. Chu must set out to stop Shiva and his minions. Despite Hu being a drunk, in 2-player mode, Chu and Hu can play simultaneously.

== Gameplay ==
The game has 10 levels, or rounds, as they are called in the game. In the first seven rounds, the player must collect eight symbols of harmony (which resembled red and white yin-yang symbols) scattered throughout the area. Some symbols are hidden and may be found by shooting certain objects in the level. Successfully finding all eight symbols will transport the player to the level's boss. After beating the boss, the player must then find the Flaming Key of Freedom hidden in the boss's room to proceed to the next round.

In rounds eight and nine, the player simply fights a boss three times and is awarded the key. In round ten the player fights two more bosses with Shiva in the background and, after defeating them, Shiva is fought. Successfully defeating Shiva wins the game.

Both Chu and Hu have similar attributes. The player may fire shots of energy with the A button and can use a fan with Chu or knife with Hu with the B button that can defend against certain projectiles (so, in order to jump, they press up on the D-pad). The player may find various items that can restore health, grant invincibility, grant extra lives, or increase the number of shots fired.

There are numerous enemies and obstacles in the levels that harm the player. If the player has the item that increases the number of shots, being harmed by anything will downgrade this item. When all lives are lost, the game is over, but the player may continue an infinite number of times. Continuing on any rounds past seven will take the player back to the start of round seven.

== Reception ==
Reception

Review score
Publication	Score
AllGame	1/5

Allgame's Skyler Miller described the game as unplayable due to some obvious bugs.

== See also ==
- Color Dreams
