= Robodemons =

1989 video game

- Cover art
- Developer(s): Color Dreams
- Publisher(s): Color Dreams
- Artist(s): Dan Burke
- Platform(s): NES
- Release: NA: December 1989
- Genre(s): Action (with shooting elements)
- Mode(s): Single-player

Robodemons is an action video game with shooting elements that was released for the Nintendo Entertainment System by Color Dreams on December 20, 1989. Like all Color Dreams games, Robodemons was not officially licensed by Nintendo.

== Gameplay ==
A screenshot of the Level of Bone

According to the game's instruction manual, the player controls a boomerang-wielding hero whose mission is to destroy the robotic demon army of the evil king Kull. There are seven levels in Robodemons, which are titled the "levels of" Bone, Flesh, Fire, Condemned Souls, Demon's Quarters, Robodemon Factory and Kull's Palace.

Unlike most Color Dreams games which featured heavy religious/Christian themes, Robodemons contains very Satanic and occult themes. It contains allusions/references to Limbo, Hell, Death, Hades and Satan. The level structure is similar to passages found in the Divine Comedy.
