= The Adventures of Captain Comic =

1988 video game

- NES cover art
- Developer: Color Dreams
- Publishers: Michael Denio (shareware); Color Dreams (NES)
- Designer: Michael Denio
- Programmer: Michael Denio
- Platforms: MS-DOS; NES
- Release: 1988: MS-DOS; 1989: NES
- Genres: Platform, Metroidvania
- Mode: Single-player

The Adventures of Captain Comic is a platform game written by Michael Denio for MS-DOS compatible operating systems and released as shareware in 1988. It was one of the first side-scrolling games for IBM PC compatibles comparable to those on the Nintendo Entertainment System, and it presaged a trend of shareware platform games in the early 1990s. A version for the NES was later published by Color Dreams as an unlicensed title.

A sequel, Captain Comic II: Fractured Reality, was released in 1990.

== Plot ==
Captain Comic is on a mission to the planet Tambi, where the quest begins. Comic must find three artifacts: the Mystical Gems of Lascorbanos, the Thousand Coins of Tenure, and the Crown of the Ages. To find them, he must travel through many varied environments. The game is completed when Comic is in possession of all three treasures.

== Gameplay ==
Captain Comic moving through a forest

Items, treasures, and enemies

The game is divided into eight major areas, and each contains three smaller zones. Transitioning between zones plays a short tune, all enemies are removed from the screen, and Comic's position is saved.

Comic has twelve "shield" points which act as health. Each time an enemy hits him, two points are removed. When at zero, Comic dies on the next hit. Occasionally, shields can be found which instantly replenish the health to full, or if it is already full, give an extra life. Comic starts with four lives, and an extra life is given for each 50,000 points earned if Comic isn't already at the maximum of five extras.

If Comic is killed by either falling off the bottom of the screen, or hit with no shield points remaining, a life is lost and he is returned to the point where he last entered this zone.

Enemies have different behaviors, from simply bouncing off walls and following preset paths to seeking Comic as he passes by. After picking up a Blastola Cola, Comic can shoot at and destroy enemies for points.

== Development ==
Michael Denio previously wrote an interactive demo of a platform game called The Adventures of Captain Pixel of the Galactic Security Patrol in 34010 AD for a prototype TMS34010 coprocessor board. The credits screen has a 1987 copyright notice for the graphics. The TMS34010 is a CPU with graphics-oriented instructions which was later used in arcade video games such as Narc and Mortal Kombat.

Denio wrote in the introduction to the Captain Comic manual:

The Adventures of Captain Comic started out as an experiment to test the viability of two theories, the first as to whether a real arcade type game can be done on a standard IBM PC with an EGA card, and secondly, given the first can be done, if it is possible to make any money doing it. Well, I've come to a conclusion on the second point, but I'll let you judge the first point for yourself.

=== Music ===
The original theme song for Captain Comic was a rendition of the United States Marine Corps Hymn. The song was replaced in the final revision of the game, released in 1991, by George Frideric Handel's Harpsichord Suite in D Minor, HWV 428, Air. The NES version of the soundtrack is composed entirely of classical music.

== Legacy ==
A sequel from the same author was published in 1990 as Captain Comic II: Fractured Reality.

In 2012, PC World called Captain Comic the twelfth greatest shareware game of all time, writing that "it inspired many other shareware authors, including the folks who would later create Commander Keen."

The original game was cloned for the SAM Coupé. It was also cloned as The Adventures of Pioneer Ksenia in 1990 by a team of Ukrainian programmers.
