= Raid 2020 =

1989 American video game

- North American cover art
- Developer: Color Dreams
- Publishers: NA: Color Dreams; AU: HES Interactive
- Designers: Dan Burke; Frank Waung
- Platform: NES
- Release: NA: 1989; AU: 1990
- Genres: Action; Run and gun
- Mode: Single-player

Raid 2020 is a 1989 cyberpunk action video game for the Nintendo Entertainment System (NES). It was developed by Dan Burke and Frank Waung and sold to Color Dreams, a studio known for publishing unlicensed NES games. Raid 2020 was released in North America and Australia.

== Plot ==
In 2020, the streets of America have been overtaken by drug cartels. Shadow, an elite narcotics division operative, must clear the streets of drug dealers and defeat the kingpin Pit Bull to prevent America from falling into total disorder. Shadow's missions take him to the futuristic locations of Technopolis, guarded by cyborg drug mules, and New L.A., where Shadow confronts and destroys Pit Bull.

== Gameplay ==
Raid 2020 is a sidescrolling action game. The player controls Shadow, a narcotics operative who can move, fire a gun, and jump. The player's objective is to defeat enemies and collect money and drugs. The player can collect power-ups providing a variety of effects.

In some levels, the player controls a vehicle, either a boat or spaceship. In these levels, the player collects items, defeats enemies, and avoids obstacles.

== Development ==
Raid 2020 was developed and released in 1989. Dan Burke, a college student in California, met Frank Waung, a working programmer. Burke and Waung went to a recruitment meeting for Color Dreams. Color Dreams had recently learned how to bypass 10NES, the NES's lock-out system restricting unlicensed software. The company stated they were looking for pitches from game development duos.

Burke and Waung decided to pitch a game called "Drug Czar." Color Dreams accepted the pitch, although did not guarantee they would pay for the finished product. Burke and Waung worked overtime out of Waung's house coding the game in Assembly. Neither had made a game before and they found the project challenging.

After six months, they delivered the game to Color Dreams and received $10,000 each. Fearing parents would be turned off by the mention of "drug" in the title, Color Dreams renamed the game to Raid 2020.

== Reception ==
Raid 2020 has been remembered as a notoriously poor game with awkward controls, confusing game mechanics, and unfair difficulty. Critics have ranked it among the worst games to be released on the NES, and it has contributed to Color Dreams' negative reputation. It was also said to reflect America's "hysteria" over the war on drugs, exploiting stereotypes of armed criminals prowling the country's neighborhoods.

Games journalist Jeff Gerstmann considers Raid 2020 one of the worst NES games released in North America, ranking it fourth worst on the system. After playing it, he said, "That is one of the worst games I've ever played in my life. But it's art. People should know about it." In 2006, the writer Seanbaby jokingly included the game in an article about games set in the future, calling it "terrible" and noting the poor reputation of Color Dreams (and its subsequent Christian-themed label, Wisdom Tree).

== See also ==
- NARC, a 1988 action game with similar anti-drug themes
