= Kart Fighter =

1993 Chinese video game

- Title screen
- Developer: Hummer Team
- Publisher: Ge De Industry Co.
- Platform: Family Computer
- Release: 1993
- Genre: Fighting
- Modes: Single-player, multiplayer

Kart Fighter (Chinese: 瑪莉快打; pinyin: Mǎlì kuài dǎ, "Mario Fast-Strike", punning on the Chinese title of Mortal Kombat) is an unlicensed 2D fighting game produced for the Family Computer by Taiwanese studio Hummer Team. The game features unauthorized appearances by Nintendo's mascot Mario and the rest of the cast of Super Mario Kart in a port of Street Fighter II. Kart Fighter has received some media attention, including mostly positive reviews, in part because of its perceived similarity to the later Super Smash Bros. series.

== Gameplay ==
Yossy (Yoshi) fights a miniskirt-wearing Princess Peach.

Kart Fighter follows many of the rules and conventions already established for the fighting game genre by the time of its release. The player engages opponents in one-on-one close quarter combat. The goal of each round is to deplete the opponent's vitality before the timer runs out. Since it is an adaptation of Street Fighter II, the controls resemble those of the Street Fighter series. The player uses the D-pad to move the character forwards, backwards, or to perform a jump. The A and B buttons perform punches and kicks, as well as jump punches and jump kicks when combined with movement. Additionally, each character has a selection of special moves performed by inputting a combination of directional and button-based commands. Unlike Street Fighter II, nearly all characters have some form of projectile attack available as a special move, but the blocking system is more limited.

Five difficulty levels are available for solo play. A second player can also select a character, allowing for two-player matches. However, because no indication of this feature appears in the game, it can be easily overlooked.

=== Characters ===
All eight playable characters from Super Mario Kart appear in Kart Fighter, although several have been renamed or are Japanese versions of names– Mari (Mario), Luigi, Peach (Princess Toadstool), Yossy (Yoshi), Kupa (Bowser), Donkey (Donkey Kong Jr.), Nokonoko (Koopa Troopa), and Kinopio (Toad). Many of the characters' appearances are closely adapted from Super Mario Kart sprites. However, Donkey Kong Jr. has a substantially different appearance and Princess Peach appears in a miniskirt and boots, similar to Chun-Li from Street Fighter.

== Development ==
During the 1980s and 1990s, production of pirate Famicom games in East Asia was commonplace, aided by the Famicom's absence of the 10NES lockout chip included in North American versions of the Nintendo Entertainment System. The commercial success of Street Fighter II made it a particularly frequent choice for unauthorized ports and adaptations. Kart Fighter was a resulting game made from this craze, developed by a team known as Hummer Team or Gouder, and published by Hong Kong–based Ge De Industry, likely in 1993.

Kart Fighter emulated the general look of the characters from the 1992 Super Famicom Super Mario Kart. The limited hardware of the 8-bit Famicom would have made the characters look far worse, especially when the source material was on a 16-bit platform, being limited to four colors instead of 16. Hummer Team overcame this by combining two separate sprites to utilize more colors for each character. Material from other games were also stolen, including a stage background taken from Little Nemo: The Dream Master.

Hummer Team also created other unauthorized Street Fighter II adaptations. One such game was included on the 1998 Super HIK 4 in 1 12M multicart, in which Mario appeared alongside characters from the Street Fighter franchise. The same engine Kart Fighter used was also modded to create the Sailor Moon-themed AV Bishoujo Senshi Girl Fighting.

== Legacy ==
Several years after its release, Kart Fighter received critical attention for its similarities to the Super Smash Bros. series. Reviews were generally positive, especially in the context of fighting games on the NES or unauthorized NES games, categories viewed as having typically poor quality. Reviews cited its originality, music, and relative lack of bugs, with several considering it one of the best unauthorized games of its era, meeting or exceeding the quality of similar licensed games such as TMNT: Tournament Fighters.

However, Complex considered Kart Fighter the worst fighting game ever made. Other reviewers remarked negatively on the screen flicker resulting from the game's sprite system, poor AI, missing menu options, and lack of a proper ending.

== See also ==
- Somari, another unlicensed Hummer Team game featuring Mario
