= Castle of Deceit =

1990 video game

- Developer: Bunch Games
- Publisher: Bunch Games
- Designers: Judye Pistole; A. R. Henderson
- Artist: A. R. Henderson
- Composer: Judye Pistole
- Platform: NES
- Release: NA: 1990
- Genre: Platform
- Mode: Single-player

Castle of Deceit is a side-scrolling platform game for the Nintendo Entertainment System released in 1990 by Bunch Games. The player controls a wizard trapped in a castle with only one spell to defend himself.

== Plot ==
Phfax, a mystic being, and wielder of the Emerald Magic, consented to offer his life to protect the stones of Rune. For centuries he dwelled within the plasma of energies of the stones where the Runes were hidden. Until at last it drove him insane. Such was the power of the stone that even the bitter hallucinations of his madness were given life. Six deadly beings appeared, stealing the Rune Stones. Cebo the most promising of the young Magicians of Dace, must enter the castle, exploring the realities. But do not trust your senses – what you see, what you hear may all be a lie.
