= Color Dreams =

Video game developer and publisher

- Company logo in 1989 as designed by Nina Stanley
- Industry: Video games (formerly); Electronics (as StarDot Technologies)
- Founded: 1989; 37 years ago
- Defunct: 1997; 29 years ago
- Fate: reformed as StarDot Technologies
- Successor: StarDot Technologies
- Headquarters: Brea, California, U.S.
- Key people: Dan Lawton (founder)
- Products: Various video games for Nintendo Entertainment System; IP cameras (as StarDot Technologies)
- Subsidiaries: Wisdom Tree (1990–1997)

Color Dreams was an American video game developer and publisher formerly known for developing and publishing unlicensed video games for the Nintendo Entertainment System (NES).

At a time when the vast majority of NES games were licensed by Nintendo, Color Dreams discovered how to bypass the 10NES lock-out system that restricted unlicensed software. By avoiding licensing fees, Color Dreams could release a large quantity of games while undercutting the prices of other publishers. The company operated in a legal gray area but was never sued by Nintendo. Color Dreams also developed a reputation for the poor quality of its games and is now infamous for publishing games considered to be some of the worst of all time.

The company attempted to shake its reputation and legal woes with name changes, launching the "Bunch Games" label and a separate Christian-themed publisher called Wisdom Tree. Color Dreams ultimately left the video game industry in the mid-1990s. The company began selling IP cameras and related surveillance equipment in 1996 and sold Wisdom Tree in 1997. Color Dreams is now known as StarDot Technologies.

== History ==
=== Founding and early years ===
Color Dreams was launched by Dan Lawton in 1989 in Brea, California, at the peak of the NES's popularity. The company had discovered a method to bypass the NES's 10NES lock-out chip. Nintendo's licensing requirements included a licensing fee and a restriction on the number of games a company could publish per year. Lawton opposed Nintendo's licensing requirements and saw a business opportunity in bypassing them: Color Dreams could sell more games at lower prices than competitors. Color Dreams also intended to modify the cartridges themselves, such as by adding an additional processor or accessing unused features in the NES hardware. After an internal legal review, the company believed they were safe from lawsuits and released Baby Boomer in 1989, with several other titles planned for quick release afterward.

Color Dreams games were marked by a baby-blue cartridge (distinguished from typical gray cartridges). For the lock-out bypass to work, players had to physically insert the cartridges using a specific technique. Later models of the NES would prevent certain Color Dreams cartridges from working correctly, posing an ongoing customer service problem for the company.

Games that were considered low-quality even by the standards of Color Dreams were released on a budget "Bunch Games" label. Five Bunch Games titles were released in 1990.

Color Dreams published games at a rapid clip (six in 1989 alone), the vast majority for the NES. In 1990, they claimed to be developing the "SuperCartridge," an NES-compatible cartridge intended to compete with the upcoming Super Nintendo. The company stated it would debut with a game adaptation of the horror film Hellraiser. The SuperCartridge attempted to simulate a 16-bit color palette by rapidly alternating between two 8-bit palettes. This did not achieve the desired effect, and the cartridges were expensive to produce, so the project was scrapped. In 1992, the company developed their only game for the Atari Lynx, Crystal Mines II; it is the studio's only console game to be licensed by its manufacturer, with Lynx manufacturer Atari Corporation acquiring the publishing rights.

The Hellraiser project too eventually fizzled out, partly because of the failure of the SuperCartridge and partly because of marketing concerns. In 1990, Color Dreams formed Wisdom Tree, a spinoff company focused on Christianity-themed games. Because Hellraiser was a mature, gory film, Color Dreams management feared it would conflict with Wisdom Tree's wholesome image, and so the project was canceled despite the company paying $50,000 for the license to the Wolfenstein 3D engine. The company's experience with that engine, however, would eventually lead to the release of Super 3D Noah's Ark in 1994.

=== Success and sale of Wisdom Tree ===
In addition to revenue from Christian video game sales, Color Dreams believed that Wisdom Tree would provide security against legal action. Color Dreams faced ongoing tensions with Nintendo. The threat of a lawsuit still loomed, and some retail stores declined to stock Color Dreams games, reportedly (though not proven) because of pressure from Nintendo. Color Dreams believed that Nintendo would not risk reputational damage by suing a publisher of Christian video games—a gambit that seemed to pay off as Color Dreams was never taken to court.

Games under the Color Dreams label started to sell poorly, and games sold by Wisdom Tree quickly took off. Wisdom Tree produced some of the company's best-selling titles, with their first release Bible Adventures selling over 350,000 copies. Some Wisdom Tree games were re-themes of existing games; Sunday Funday, for example, was a Christian skateboard game based on the earlier Menace Beach. True to its origins, Wisdom Tree would also publish the only unlicensed SNES game ever released in North America, Super 3D Noah's Ark.

Color Dreams began to pivot away from video games, launching a division called StarDot Technologies in 1996 focused on surveillance equipment. In 1997, an employee named Brenda Huff purchased Wisdom Tree and split it off as a separate company. Wisdom Tree continues to operate today selling religious video games. After the sale of Wisdom Tree, Color Dreams left the video game industry entirely and now does business as StarDot Technologies.

== Video games published by Color Dreams ==
All games were developed for the Nintendo Entertainment System unless otherwise noted.

- Baby Boomer (1989)
- The Adventures of Captain Comic (1989)
- Crystal Mines (1989)
- Master Chu and the Drunkard Hu (1989; developed by Joy Van)
- Metal Fighter (1989; the U.S. version of Joyvan Kid, developed by Joy Van)
- Raid 2020 (1989)
- Challenge of the Dragon (1990)
- King Neptune's Adventure (1990)
- Menace Beach (1990)
- P'radikus Conflict (1990)
- Pesterminator: The Western Exterminator (1990)
- Robodemons (1990)
- Silent Assault (1990; the U.S. version of Raid, developed by Joy Van)
- Captain Comic II: Fractured Reality (1990; only for MS-DOS)
- Operation Secret Storm (1991)
- Secret Scout in the Temple of Demise (1991)
- Crystal Mines II (1992; only for Atari Lynx)
- Free Fall (prototype)

=== As Bunch Games ===
- Castle of Deceit (1990)
- Galactic Crusader (1990; the U.S. version of Incantation, developed by Joy Van)
- Mission Cobra (1990; the U.S. version of Sidewinder, developed by Joy Van)
- Moon Ranger (1990; developed by Odyssey Software)
- Tagin' Dragon (1990; the U.S. version of Colorful Dragon, developed by Sachen)

=== As Wisdom Tree ===
- Bible Adventures (1991)
- Exodus (1991)
- King of Kings: The Early Years (1991)
- Joshua & the Battle of Jericho (1992)
- Spiritual Warfare (1992)
- Bible Buffet (1993)
- Super 3D Noah's Ark (1994; for Super NES and MS-DOS)
- Sunday Funday (1995)

=== Unreleased games ===
- The Escape from Atlantis
- Happy Camper
- Hellraiser
- Seven Gates to Eternity

== See also ==
- Home Entertainment Suppliers
- Tengen
- Sachen
- Zemina
