= Operation Secret Storm =

1992 video game

- Cover art
- Publisher: Color Dreams
- Designer: Jon Valesh
- Artist: Nancy Valesh
- Composer: Sandy Sims
- Platform: Nintendo Entertainment System
- Release: NA: 1992
- Genre: Beat 'em up
- Mode: Single-player

Operation Secret Storm is an action-oriented video game released in 1992 for the NES platform. Players control a secret agent named George B.—widely seen as a caricature of then-United States President George H. W. Bush—as he fights the Iraqi army. The game uses beat-'em-up combat mechanics on a 2D plane. The character collects ammunition and grenades while travelling through Iraq and defeating stereotypical Arabic enemies.

== Reception ==
Saddam Hussein, as he appears in this game, is ranked eighth in Electronic Gaming Monthly’s list of the top ten videogame politicians. The game's superhero caricature of George H. W. Bush was ranked as one of the greatest videogame Presidents by G4.
