= Mission Cobra =

1989 video game

- North American cover art
- Developer(s): Joy Van
- Publisher(s): AS: Sachen; AU: HES Interactive; NA: Bunch Games; BR: Milmar
- Platform(s): Nintendo Entertainment System
- Release: AU: 1989; NA: 1990
- Genre(s): Scrolling shooter
- Mode(s): Single-player, multiplayer

Mission Cobra (known as Sidewinder in Australia and Asia) is a vertically scrolling shooter for the Nintendo Entertainment System. It was developed by Joy Van and published in Australia by HES Interactive and in Brazil by Milmar. It was later published in the U.S. by Bunch Games.

== Plot ==
As commander of a fast and powerful helicopter, the player must fight through waves of enemy aircraft and destroy their commander.

== Gameplay ==
The game can be played by a single player, or by two players co-operatively. The player's life consists of an "Exx" counter. The player begins with 66 and this is not only health but also fuel. This will be drained constantly when flying and a large amount will be lost if hit by enemy fire. When an enemy vehicle is destroyed they leave power-ups and some refill the "Exx" counter. If the "Exx" counter reaches zero by flying the player will still be able to fly but will die instantly if hit by enemy fire.

=== Stages ===
There are three levels in the game and they all end with a boss fight. If all levels are beat the game loops and stage one will act as stage four and so on. There is no ending apart from the game over screen.
