= Captain Comic II: Fractured Reality =

1990 video game

- Developer(s): Color Dreams
- Publisher(s): ComputerEasy
- Designer(s): Michael Denio
- Platform(s): MS-DOS
- Release: 1990
- Genre(s): Platform
- Mode(s): Single-player

Captain Comic II: Fractured Reality is the 1990 sequel to the 1988 MS-DOS platform game The Adventures of Captain Comic. The game was created by the same author as the original, Michael Denio, working at Color Dreams, and was published by ComputerEasy. The game adds a save/continue feature, four-way scrolling, and new movement types (e.g., swimming, flying). Unlike the original (which was shareware), the game was sold commercially.

== Plot ==

Three months out from Tambo, Captain Comic receives a distress signal. Being the brave hero that he is, Captain Comic rushes to the aid of the local populace. Captain Comic must find a machine which allows him to travel to six different realities, in which he must collect the six crystals to save the planet and its inhabitants from evil aliens known as the "Skrejgib" (which, backwards, reads "Big Jerks").

== Gameplay ==
Captain Comic's health is protected by a shield. Once the shield's points are exhausted by coming into contact with enemy units, Comic loses a life if he's struck again. Additionally, if Comic falls off the bottom of a screen a life is lost. If Comic finds a bonus shield it will restore the points to maximum, or add the shield to his inventory for later use if already at full. The game is over when Comic loses all of his lives (or completes the main objective of the game).

Bonus items can generally be found in strategic locations or inside boxes or crates that need to be opened up or destroyed by use of the pick-axe tool. Items range from gems (points), shields (health), mini-Comics (bonus lives), to tools that can be used for other purposes. A notable addition is the magic wand which can turn some useless items into useful items, ranging from powerups to keys. Generally, items also add to the player's score when collected. A new feature in this version of the game is the ability to change the 'active' item in Comic's inventory.

Comic must also avoid or destroy various enemies in the game, primarily by use of Blastola Cola, which allows him to shoot enemies. Enemies range from simple units on pre-set paths to more difficult combatants that follow Comic or seek him out directly. Some enemies move faster than others, and most are restricted to their domain (fish enemies only appear in water, for example). All enemies have the same general property in that when they come in contact with Comic they are destroyed, but reduce his shield points accordingly (from one to four shield points depending on the enemy, as opposed to two regardless of type in Captain Comic). Destroying enemy units by shooting them also increases the player's score (by 100 to 400 points, depending on how many shield points would normally be deducted). Coming into contact with one of the Temple Masters also results in death.

The game is divided into major areas, each with smaller zones. Passing from one zone or area into another marks a safe point (although this version of the game also has a save-game feature). Typically areas are identified by the presence of doorways, which require the correct key (in the previous Episode one key opened all doors; in this Episode there are multiple keys denoted by color or design).

Comic can complete the main objective in the game by successfully navigating areas and obtaining items and tools. As Comic works his way through the stages of the game, he collects more and better items to help with the increasingly difficult enemies that he must face.

== Development ==
Michael Denio previously wrote an interactive demo of a platform game called The Adventures of Captain Pixel of the Galactic Security Patrol in 34010 AD for a TMS34010 coprocessor board. He then released the platform game The Adventures of Captain Comic (1988) as shareware for MS-DOS compatible operating systems. Denio released Captain Comic II: Fractured Reality as a "retail upgrade". Diana Gruber, in the book Action Arcade Adventure Set (1994), commented that the first Captain Comic game was "beautiful and popular", however, "it was not marketed well and did not make very much money for" Denio. Gruber stated that similarly the second game was "an outstanding game" which "didn't sell well either".
