= Duck Maze =

1987 video game

- Australian cover art
- Developer: Bit Corporation
- Publishers: Bit Corporation (Taiwan); HES Interactive (Australia); Dismac (Brazil)
- Platform: NES
- Release: TW: 1987; AU: 1990; BRA: 1990
- Genre: Puzzle-platform
- Mode: Single-player

Duck Maze is a puzzle-platform game developed and published by Bit Corporation in 1987. The title was later published in 1990 by HES and Dismac, respectively in Australia and Brazil.

== Gameplay ==
Duck Maze is a clone of Doki Doki Penguin Land by Sega, originally released in 1985 on SG-1000 and MSX, in which the player controls a duck to guide an egg downwards of its 20 levels by moving or destroying blocks. Furthermore, one of the three lives available can be lost when the egg touches an enemy or when it breaks down falling too high.
