= Somari =

1994 unlicensed video game

Somari the Adventurer
- Title screen
- Developer: Hummer Team
- Publisher: Ge De Industry Co. (Note: Ge De also held the trademark of the game, but the company was disestablished in 1995 for unknown reasons and KaSheng (卡聖) bought its assets and the later reprints of the game were published by them)
- Series: Super Mario (unofficially); Sonic the Hedgehog (unofficially)
- Platform: Family Computer
- Genre: Platform
- Mode: Single-player

Somari the Adventurer (commonly known as simply Somari (Chinese: 森瑪麗; pinyin: Sēnmǎlì and 速音瑪莉; pinyin: Sùyīn mǎlì) is an unauthorized side-scrolling platform video game for the Family Computer. An unlicensed remake of Sega's 1991 Sega Genesis/Mega Drive game Sonic the Hedgehog, the game was sold primarily around Asia, Russia, Eastern Europe, and other regions where bootleg NES and Famicom cartridges were distributed. Like the original, players venture to defeat the mad scientist Dr. Robotnik, who plots to turn the animal population of the fictional South Island into evil robots. Unlike the original, the game features Nintendo's mascot Mario as the main character rather than Sonic. The title is a portmanteau of "Sonic" and "Mario".

Somari was developed by Hummer Team. The title caught the attention of contemporary video game journalists, who commented upon its accurate recreation of the original game.

== Gameplay ==
A gameplay screenshot, showing Somari's version of Green Hill Zone, with Mario as the player instead of Sonic

The gameplay and plot of Somari is substantially similar to that of the original Sonic the Hedgehog. The game follows the player's quest to defeat Dr. Robotnik, who has converted all the animals of South Island into evil robots. However, the game features Mario as the main character, rather than Sonic. Mirroring Sonic's emphasis on speed, Mario can run at high speeds, although gameplay as a whole is slightly slower. Items, bosses, levels, and enemies are all identical to Sonic. Somari must collect 100 golden rings in order to enter the bonus stage at the end of the level, but being injured by enemies causes him to lose rings. The game employs a timer as in Sonic, however regardless of what time is scored the player always gets a "Time Bonus" of 5000 points. As in Sonic, each level is divided into three acts, and the third act ends with a boss fight with Robotnik.

Although Somari borrows the concepts for its game dynamics from the original Sonic the Hedgehog, the implementation of them differs in many ways. Unlike the original Sonic the Hedgehog game, the player character can use the "spin-dash" feature first implemented in Sonic the Hedgehog 2 (1992). Other notable differences include the fact that whereas Sonic would lose all his collected rings after being injured by an enemy, Mario always loses a maximum of 3 rings even when carrying a single ring. Each area in Somari is taken from the original Sonic the Hedgehog game, borrowing many elements from the original stages, but some level layouts are completely new. Significantly, elements of level design from the Mario series, such as off-screen secret areas high above the player's field of view, make appearances in certain areas.

== Development ==
Somari was developed by the pirate homebrew developer Hummer Team, though they are credited in-game as Somari Team. The game's levels are based on the Sega Genesis version of the first Sonic game, with the exception of the Scrap Brain Zone, while the bonus stages are based on the Master System and Game Gear versions. The game features Sonic's Spin Dash, which was not introduced until Sonic the Hedgehog 2. The audio of the game is similar to the original, but suffers from a poor conversion to the NES's sound system. The word "Somari" is a portmanteau of "Sonic" and "Mario".

It is unknown precisely how, when, or where the game was created. However, it was likely made in Asia, as a Taiwanese trademark for "Somari" was registered on March 1, 1994. In 1995, in an article regarding an editor visiting South Korea to try new games there, Game Urara Vol. 4 states that Somari has been introduced to Japan. The movement of Mario is based on the mechanics and physics of the Sonic character from Sonic the Hedgehog 2.

The game was marketed in gaming magazines in Hong Kong and in Russia during the late 1990s; today, it can also be found in the United States in specialized gaming stores. The game also remains a popular title for emulation.

== Reception ==
The concept of a crossover and/or mashup title bringing the popular video game characters Mario and Sonic the Hedgehog into one game had been a long-running dream in video game culture. Although Somari does not feature both characters in the same game, the fact that Mario had been placed into the world of Sonic the Hedgehog was registered with astonishment. Russian gaming magazine Great Drakon scored the game 4/10 (only 2/10 for sales volume) and commented in a review that at last 8-bit console gamers could roughly gain the experience of 16-bit gaming as with Sonic.

Despite the similarities between Somari and the original game, reviewers were quick to point out the many differences between them. Commentators on the Russian TV program Dendy: The New Reality stated that "Somari for Dendy is not the same as Sonic for SEGA. ... Everything's different". Contemporary criticism of the game emphasized its difficulty relative to the original Sonic title, and the game was characterized as having complex controls (although reviews claimed that these could be mastered in time).

GamesRadar listed Somari on their list of "Crazy ass rom hacks", calling it "Less mash-up and more train wreck" due to poor physics and unresponsive controls, and recommended that players instead purchase Super Smash Bros. Brawl if they wished for a crossover featuring Mario and Sonic. GameSpy, however, described the game as "a remarkably good port/hack of Sonic to the NES," and Atari HQ described it as "amazing[ly] original" with "more than adequate" level-porting. 1UP.com considered it "excellently coded" for a homebrew NES game.

== See also ==
- Kart Fighter – another unlicensed Hummer Team game featuring Mario
