= Metal Fighter =

1989 video game

- North American cover art
- Developer(s): Joy Van
- Publisher(s): AS: Sachen; NA: Color Dreams; AU: HES Interactive; JP: Kinema Music
- Platform(s): Nintendo Entertainment System
- Release: NA: 1989; JP: October 30, 1991
- Genre(s): Side-scrolling action with shooting elements
- Mode(s): Single-player

Metal Fighter is a side-scrolling shooter game developed in Taiwan by Joy Van and published by Color Dreams and Sachen. It was later published as Metal Fighter μ (メタルファイター ミュー) in Japan by Kinema Music in 1991.

== Gameplay ==
Players control a robot named MCS-920 in an attempt to free planet H17 from alien invaders. MCS-920's weapons and speed can be enhanced by defeating certain enemies and collecting the power-ups they drop. There is also a special power-up that grants the ability to fly.
