= Galactic Crusader =

1990 video game

- Developer(s): Joy Van
- Publisher(s): NA: Bunch Games; AU: Sachen
- Platform(s): NES
- Release: NA: 1990; AU: 1990
- Genre(s): Scrolling shooter
- Mode(s): Single-player

Galactic Crusader is an unlicensed vertically scrolling shooter for the Nintendo Entertainment System developed by Joy Van and published by Sachen in 1990. It was released in the US by Bunch Games, and finally in Japan by Kinema Music as Papillon Gals (the latter version contains nudity).

== Gameplay ==
The game is a top-down perspective shooter, often compared to the popular space shooter Galaga. The player progresses through numerous stages, using missiles and lasers to shoot oncoming enemies. One notable difference from Galaga is Galactic Crusader's many bosses which the player confronts at the end of each level, which often take many hits to defeat.
