= Home Entertainment Suppliers =

Australian video game distribution company

Home Entertainment Suppliers Pty. Ltd.
- Type: Privately held
- Industry: Video games
- Founded: 1984
- Headquarters: Riverwood, Sydney, Australia
- Subsidiaries: Tru Blu Entertainment
- Website: http://www.hes.net/

Home Entertainment Suppliers Pty. Ltd. (or HES) is an Australian company that distributes computer games and gaming equipment. HES' offices are based in Riverwood, Sydney. HES's founder and managing director is Sebastian Giompaolo.

They began distributing Commodore 64 titles such as Pitfall! made in 1982 and Kung-Fu Master in 1984 and Atari 2600 titles nearing the end of the 1980s under the name Activision.

HES still remains a dominant distributor within Australia, despite not being well known. HES currently is the distributor for Mad Catz, Saitek, and Gamester joysticks, cables, memory cards, and other peripherals. HES also remains the official Australian distributor for Action Replay.

Quite a large number of software titles are currently also being distributed by HES for Windows, Xbox, PlayStation 2 and Game Boy Advance by publishers ZOO Digital Publishing, Tru Blu Entertainment and Phantagram.

HES gained a reputation for developing and distributing peripherals such as their auto-fire controllers, Game Boy power adaptors, Master System converters for the Mega Drive, and the HES Unidaptor and HES Unidaptor MKII for NES games.

In 1999, the company created the publishing arm Tru Blu Entertainment for software titles created by the company, including the hit NRL Rugby League and AFL Live titles.

== Nintendo Entertainment System ==
=== Unlicensed ===
HES seal to mimic the Nintendo Seal of Quality.

In the late 1980s and early 1990s, HES ported games from American Game Cartridges, American Video Entertainment (AVE), Bit Corp, Color Dreams, Epyx, Thin Chen Enterprise (Sachen, Joy Van, etc.) and Tengen onto the Nintendo Entertainment System (NES) as unlicensed titles, although they did not release games by Camerica or Active Enterprises. Most games were released in plastic cases like a video box with printed instructions on the inside, however sometimes the AVE titles were released in their original AVE boxes with a HES sticker simply stuck over AVE's original one. HES at the time became widely known for their unlicensed distribution of NES games at budget prices. Nintendo tried to fight against all unlicensed companies by introducing a Nintendo Seal of Quality on all their products which signified that titles adorning the symbol are guaranteed to operate on their NES hardware. To combat this, HES introduced their own seal that mimicked Nintendo’s seal, possibly in the hope of confusing buyers.

In order to circumvent other methods that Nintendo created to stop unlicensed developers (10NES), HES developed the 'Piggy Back' or 'Dongle' games, where one could insert an official NES cart into the HES game and it operated the country code of the official title instead of HES'. This was so successful that HES also used the same technology to build a device to entirely bypass the 10NES security protocol which was released as the HES Unidaptor. The adapter allowed NTSC 72-pin NES and 60-pin Famicom games to be played on a PAL NES.

HES brought games to Australia that were unobtainable anywhere else in the western world, which since then became classics. HES decided to launch their multigame cartridges and a few single game titles in limited quantities. As a result, these releases are rare and almost impossible to come across.

=== NES titles ===
- Arctic Adventure: Penguin & Seal
- Chiller
- Death Race
- Duck Maze
- F-15 City War
- Impossible Mission 2
- International Ultimate League Soccer
- Jackpot
- Little Red Hood
- Othello
- Pac-Man
- Pipemania
- Raid 2020
- Pyramid
- R.B.I. Baseball
- Sidewinder
- Super Sprint
- Toobin'
- Twin Eagle
- Vindicators

==== Multi-game cartridges ====
- 2 Pack Special (International Ultimate Soccer League (Magexa Soccer), Super Sprint)
- 4 in 1 Fun Blaster Pak (Pipemania, Twin Eagle, Joyvan Kid, and Little Red Hood)3
- 4 in 1 Total Funpak (Pac-Man, Sidewinder, Duck Maze, and Othello)
- 4 in 1 Mind Blower Pak (Math Quiz, Jackpot, Arctic Adventure, and Incantation)
- Maxi 15 (2 Variants, Red Cart which had Game Number 3 as "Death Race" and Game Number 6 as "Double Strike" and a more rarer Green Cart which has Game Number 3 as "Pyramid" and Game Number 6 as "Black Jack"
- Real Players Pack 6-Pak (has the same unique games as Caltron 6 in 1/Myriad 6 in 1)

== Other ==
=== 4 Pak All Action ===
4 Pak All Action was a 1995 unlicensed video game for the Master System that was released exclusively in Australia. This game is only compatible with the Master System 2 console or the Power Base Converter for the Genesis. It includes four games: Power Block, Adventure Kid, Twin Mouse, and Cave Dude.

=== Atari 2600 titles ===
HES released quite a few titles and multi game packs for the Atari 2600 Video Computer System. The cartridges are virtually identical to the Activision cartridges, but the Activision logo on the underside is blacked out.

- 2 Pak Special(Dungeon Master, Creature Strike)
- Smash Hit Pak (5-in-1 cartridge: Frogger, Stampede, Seaquest, Boxing, Skiing)
- Super Hit Pak (5-in-1 cartridge: River Raid, Grand Prix, Fishing Derby, Sky Jinks, Checkers)
