= Hummer Team =

Bootleg video game developer

- Type: Private
- Founded: 1992
- Founder: Hummer Cheng
- Defunct: 2010
- Headquarters: Taipei, Taiwan
- Products: Video games

Hummer Team (Chinese: 悍馬小組; pinyin: Hànmǎ Xiǎozǔ) was a Taiwanese developer of bootleg video games. It was most well known for making NES ports of games originally developed on more advanced hardware.

== History ==
Hummer Team was founded in Taipei in 1992 by Hummer Cheng, who had previously worked at Sachen. It was originally dedicated to the development and publishing of unauthorized ports of video games for the Nintendo Famicom. The first video game published by Hummer Team was Jing Ke Xin Zhuan (1992), a role-playing video game. Upon the releases of Kart Fighter (1993) and Somari (1994), the company began to gain attention.

In the late 1990s and early 2000s, Hummer Team experienced economic troubles because it had difficulty developing for the fifth generation of video game consoles. This caused Hummer to begin making games for plug and play consoles, and working on things other than the Famicom. Examples of these plug and plays include the Samuri 60-in-1 and Z-Dog, the latter of which was released in 2006 by Zechess and was their final product. Most of their later plug-n-play consoles were based on OneBus "VT03" enhanced famiclone hardware by the Taiwanese company V.R. Technology.

== Recognition (1992–2006) ==
Hummer Team's first game, Jīng Kē Xīn Zhuàn, was released in 1992. The company was known in Argentina by its publisher, Yoko Soft, after the release of Street Fighter II: The World Warrior in 1993. Some of Hummer Team's better known games include Street Fighter II: The World Warrior, an unlicensed port of Street Fighter II, Kart Fighter, a Street Fighter clone infamously using characters from the game Super Mario Kart, and Somari, a port of the original Sonic the Hedgehog game to the Famicom, featuring Mario instead of Sonic. Somari in particular gained a bit of notoriety, having been made fun of by many content creators and video game journalists for its poor physics, modified object placement and replacement of Sonic as the main character.

== Games ==
Game	Chinese name	Note	Published
Jīng Kē Xīn Zhuàn	荊軻新傳	A Chinese language RPG. The first game by Hummer Team, published by Supertone.	1992
Street Fighter II: The World Warrior	街頭霸王 II：世界勇士	A port of Street Fighter II.	1992
Street Fighter IV	快打傳説	An enhanced version of their port of Street Fighter II, with new characters and locations.	1993
Kart Fighter	瑪莉快打	Another port of Street Fighter II, this time featuring the cast of Super Mario Kart. It gained popularity as an unofficial precursor to the Super Smash Bros. series.	1993
Somari	索馬里	A port of Sonic the Hedgehog featuring Mario as the main character.	1994
Dragon Ball Z – Super Butoden 2	龍珠 Z – 超級武神 2		1994
Tekken	鐵拳	A port of the Super NES game. Based on the same engine as their Street Fighter II game.	1994
Mortal Kombat III	眞人快打 3	In actuality, a port of the original Mortal Kombat. Also known as Mortal Kombat IV.	1994
AV Bishoujo Senshi Girl Fighting	AV.美少女戰士	A hack of their Street Fighter II game where you play as various female characters from different games. When the player wins a round, they are shown hentai as a reward.	
Aladdin	阿拉丁	Based on the Capcom title released for the Super Nintendo Entertainment System.	1995
Super Mario World	超级马里奥世界	A port of the SNES game of the same name.	1995
Sānguó Chūnqiū: Sìchuān Shěng	三國春秋 四川省 ("Shisen-sho from Three Countries to the Spring and Autumn Period")		1996
Yuu Yuu Hakusho Final	宇宇白皮書終稿		1996
Street Fighter Zero 2 '96	街頭霸王零式 2 '96		1996
Street Fighter Zero 3 '97	街頭霸王零式 2 '97		1997
The King of Fighters '96	拳皇'96		1997
Tiny Toon Adventures 6	小香椿歷險記 6	A port of Tiny Toon Adventures: Babs' Big Break, originally released for the Game Boy.	1997
Sonic & Knuckles 5	索尼克與指關節 5	A hack of Somari that replaces Mario with Sonic the Hedgehog.	1997
Donkey Kong Country 4	大金剛 4 ("Donkey Kong 4")	An unlicensed port of Donkey Kong Country, which was originally released on the SNES.	1997
Earthworm Jim 3	蚯蚓吉姆 3	An unlicensed port of the Sega Genesis version of Earthworm Jim, published by NT.	1997
Final Fight 3	最後的戰鬥 3	A port of the SNES game of the same name.	1998
The King of Fighters '98	拳皇'98		1998
Titenic	泰坦尼克號	A beat-em-up video game inspired by James Cameron's movie Titanic. The first 3 stages take place before the ship sinks, and the last 3 take place while it is sinking. The player plays as Jack for the first 3 stages, and for the last 3 stages, they switch to playing as Rose. The game contains enemies stolen from the SNES game The Mask. Despite being developed in 1998, it was not published until 2003 due to Hummer being unable to find a publisher. The music consists of Famicom arrangements of various themes from the movie.	1998
War	战争	A game where the player plays as a soldier throwing grenades and shooting at enemies. Contains graphics and music reused from many of Hummer's earlier demakes.	
Mortal Kombat 2	眞人快打 2		2000
Mortal Kombat II special	眞人快打II 特別版		2000
Harry's Legend	哈利的传奇	A reskin of Titenic based on the book Harry Potter and the Philosophers Stone. It was commissioned because Titenic's planned publisher, Silicon Application, believed consumers would not be interested in a game based on Titanic, and thus altered the game to fit a more popular franchise. The Titanic music was replaced with generic music in order to disguise the origins of the game.	2001
The Hummer	悍馬	A reskin of Somari with an altered character sprite resembling Hummer Team's mascot, a horse named Hummer.	2002
Mortal Kombat 4	眞人快打 4	A reskin of Mortal Kombat III with an altered title screen and broken controls. The game is considered unplayable due to the button inputs being incorrectly assigned.	2003
Mighty Morphin Power Rangers III	強大的嗎啡電力別動隊 III	A port of the game of the same name.	2003
Shin Samurai	真侍魂II		2003
New Super-strong Year Cart	超强年度新卡	A Famicom multicart released by Hongjing (鴻景), also known as Brightech. Contains variants of earlier Hummer Team games altered to remove copyrighted materials, most notably Titenic. It also contains several original games containing reused assets from earlier games as well. Created presumably to celebrate the Chinese New Year. Colloquially known as its older mistranslation "Super New Year Cart 15-in-1".	2005
Titenic Remake	泰坦尼克號翻拍	A remake of the original Titenic. This version has different music, as found in Harry's Legend. It was not published as one game, but rather the above and below water levels were published in separate sections on Hummer future plug and plays.	2005

== Plug and Play consoles ==
Console	Chinese name	Note	Published
King Fishing	钓鱼王	A fishing rod-shaped plug and play containing a game inspired by Sega Bass Fishing. The first plug and play console containing Hummer Team software. The game was commissioned by a Hong Kong-based company named Apollo Electronics, which manufactured the hardware. The console was distributed in the US by Excalibur Electronics of Miami, Florida.	2001
Samuri 60-in-1	Samuri 60合1	The first plug and play console published by Zechess. Contains a controller modeled after the original Xbox controller, with a tomoe in the middle.	2006
Z-Dog	Z狗	The second and final plug-and-play console published by Zechess. The last product released under Hummer Team before their closure. It is estimated that only 300 units were sold.	2006
