= Thin Chen Enterprise =

Taiwanese video game company

Thin Chen Enterprise Co., Ltd 聖謙企業股份有限公司
- Company type: Private
- Industry: Video games
- Founded: 1988
- Defunct: 2007; 19 years ago
- Fate: Defunct
- Headquarters: Taipei, Taiwan
- Website: http://www.sachen.com.tw (archived)

Thin Chen Enterprise (full name Sheng Qian Enterprise Co., Ltd (Chinese: 聖謙企業股份有限公司; pinyin: Shèng Qiān Qǐyè Gǔfèn Yǒuxiàn Gōngsī)), also known as Sachen, was a Taiwanese company that published several original games for the Nintendo Entertainment System, Mega Drive, Game Boy and other early cartridge-based handheld systems such as the Watara Supervision and Mega Duck. With the exception of the latter two handhelds, all of Thin Chen's games were produced without license from the console manufacturers. The company produced at least 70 unique games for the NES and Famicom and at least 32 for the Game Boy (compiled into eight 4-in-1 cartridges), making it the most prolific unlicensed publisher for both consoles. The company also produced its own Nintendo Entertainment System hardware clones, such as the Q-Boy. Many of its games were released in an unfinished state, and received largely negative critical response.

Most of Thin Chen's products were released under the "Sachen" brand name, although the name Commin was also used for games on handheld consoles. Several of their NES games were released outside Taiwan under license by foreign publishers, including: HES Interactive in Australia, Hacker International in Japan (usually with added pornographic content), Bunch Games/Color Dreams and American Video Entertainment in the United States, and Milmar in Brazil.

Their earlier games were developed by a branch called Joy Van, before it merged with Thin Chen and became its development team.

== Developed games ==
=== Nintendo Entertainment System/Family Computer ===
==== List of titles as Thin Chen ====
#	Serial number	Title	AKA title(s)	Original release	Notes
1	SA-003	Middle School English	Dòng Dòngnǎo II - Guó Zhōng Yīngwén	1989	
2	SA-002	The Penguin & Seal		1989	Published in AUS by HES Interactive as Arctic Adventure: Penguin & Seal.
3	SA-001	Taiwan Mahjong 16	Táiwān Máquè 16	1989	
4	SA-013	Dancing Block		1990	
5	TC-029	Gaiapolis		1990	An unofficial port of the homonym arcade game.
6	SA-008	The Mahjong World	Máquè Shìjiè	1990	1) Contains nudity. 2) Published in Japan by Hacker International as Mahjong Summit Kabuchiko Hen.
7	SA-014	Magical Mathematics		1990	Credited as Magic Mathematic on title screen.
8	SA-027	Mahjang Companion	Mahjong Partner	1990	1) Contains nudity. 2) Published in Japan by Hacker International.
9	TC-013	Poker II		1990	4 games in 1: Max 2, Ghost Buster, 99 and Change Around.
10	SA-009	Pyramid		1990	1) A puzzle game. 2) Published in the U.S. by American Video Entertainment, in AUS by HES Interactive, and in Japan by Hacker International. 3) The Hacker version contains nudity, and was also re-released by the same Sachen.
11	SA-010	Pyramid II		1990	
12	SA-012	Millionaire		1990	A board game similar to Monopoly.
13	SA-015	Chess Academy	Xiàngqí Xué Yuán	1991	
14	SA-016	Hell Fighter		1991	
15	SA-017	Locksmith		1991	A mix of action and puzzle.
16	TC-015	Olympic I.Q.		1991	
17	TC-023	PoPo Team		1991	
18	SA-021	Final Combat		1992	
19	SA-019	The Great Wall		1992	
20	—N/a	Magical Tower		1992	
21	—N/a	Puff Kid		1992	A prototype of the game Q Boy.
22	SA-025	Taiwan Mahjong II	1) Táiwān Máquè 16 II; 2) Bonus Tiles Mahjong	1992	Credited as Táiwān Huā Pái Máquè 16 on title screen.
23	SA-020	Tasac		1992	A basic vertical space-shooter.
24	SA-024	2-in-1 Tough Cop		1993	1) 2 games in 1: Tough Cop and Super Tough Cop. 2) Cartridge says "Light Gun Game", green label.
25	SA-022	Huge Insect		1993	1) A Galaga-style game with a wildlife theme rather than a space theme. 2) Produced in 1993 but remained unreleased until the early 2000s.
26	TC-024	Rockball		1993	
27	TC-026	Q Boy		1994	A prototype screenshot in the back of certain Sachen game manuals shows the game being named Puff Kid at one point, and having a menu that contains an "Options" menu.
28	TC-025	Silver Eagle		1994	An overhead shoot 'em up very similar to Bloody Wolf or Metal Gear. The main character is sometimes called "Snake", which is the name of both the main protagonist in the Metal Gear series and one of the character's names in Bloody Wolf.
29	TC-030	Thunder Blaster Man	Rocman X	1995	A platformer with a gliding ability and a boomerang weapon, title screen and Chinese version label says "Rocman X".
30	TC-032	中國大亨, Zhōngguó Dàhēng	Millionaire II	Unknown	A board game similar to Game of the Goose.
31	—N/a	Měi Shǎo Nú Mèng Gōngchǎng		Unknown	An unofficial Chinese-language port of Princess Maker.

==== List of titles as Sachen ====
#	Serial number	Title	AKA title(s)	Original release	Notes
1	TC-011	Chinese KungFu		1989	A clone of the game Double Dragon.
2	SA-005	Colorful Dragon		1989	
3	SA-004	Lucky Bingo		1989	1) A slot-machine simulator. 2) Credited as Lucky 777 on title screen.
4	—N/a	Mine Sweeper		1989	
5	—N/a	Mine Sweeper 2		1989	
6	—N/a	Mine Sweeper 3		1989	
7	SA-007	Bingo 75		1990	1) A slot-machine simulator containing nudity. 2) Credited as 75 Bingo on title screen.
8	—N/a	Challenge of the Dragon		1990	1) The U.S. version of Chinese KungFu. 2) Its title is not related to the Color Dreams game of the same name.
9	—N/a	Double Strike: Aerial Attack Force		1990	The U.S. version of Twin Eagle; published by American Video Entertainment.
10	TC-009	Galactic Crusader		1990	
11	—N/a	Mission Cobra		1990	
12	SA-006	Honey Peach	Měinǚ Quán	1990	Contains nudity.
13	SA-011	Pipe V		1990	1) Credited as Pipe 5 on title screen. 2) Published in AUS by HES Interactive as Pipemania.
14	—N/a	Mahjong Trap Plus	Sìchuān Máquè - Zhìfú Piān	1990	1) Contains nudity. 2) Published in Japan by Hacker International as Shisen Mahjong: Seifuku Hen.
15	—N/a	Tagin' Dragon		1990	
16	TC-012	The World of Card Games	1) Poker I 2) Boku Koku Shuu Kin	1990	4 games in 1: Omnibus Hearts, Fan Tan, Chinese Rummy, and The Clock.
17	TC-017	Auto-Upturn		1991	1) A puzzle game. 2) Contains nudity in later levels.
18	TC-019	Chinese Checkers		1991	
19	TC-016	Happy Pairs		1991	A Mahjong solitaire game.
20	TC-018	Magic Cube		1991	
21	SA-026	Mahjong Academy	1) Máquè Xué Yuán - Zúyè Piān; 2) Mahjong School	1992	Contains nudity.
22	TC-020	Poker III	Poker III 5-in-1	1991	5 games in 1: King of Casino, King Poker, Poker, Blackjack, and The 13 Cards.
23	SA-018	Poker Mahjong	Pūkè Máquè	1991	
24	TC-014	Strategist		1991	2 games in 1: Poker Racing and The Battle of Poker.
25	TC-021	Super Pang		1991	An unofficial port of the arcade game Pang.
26	—N/a	Frog Adventure		1992	An unofficial port of the arcade game Frogger.
27	TC-022	Super Pang II		1992	An unofficial port of the arcade game Super Pang.
28	—N/a	Worm Visitor		1992	Similar to Frogger.
29	SA-023	2-in-1 Cosmocop		1993	1) 2 games in 1: Cosmocop and Cyber Monster. 2) Cartridge says "Light Gun Game", red-grey label.
30	TC-028	Jurassic Boy		1994	1) A Sonic 2 clone that lacks abilities from the original, such as rolling along the ground and spin dash. The NES manual mentions these features, however, and the game itself contains numerous unused sprites, suggesting these features were planned. 2) Credited as Jurassic Boy 2 on title screen.
31	TC-027	Street Heroes	Samurai Spirits	1995	1) A fighting game with extensive use of voice samples. 2) The version titled Samurai Spirits is not a port of the arcade game of the same name.

==== List of titles developed by Joy Van ====
#	Serial number	Title	AKA title(s)	Original release	Notes
1	TC-001	Jovial Race	迷魂車, Míhúnchē	1989	1) Similar to Rally-X. 2) Published in Brazil by Milmar.
2	TC-002	Hidden Chinese Chess	暗棋 帥 將, Ànqí Shuài Jiāng	1989	
3	TC-003	Sidewinder	1) 響尾蛇, Xiǎngwěishé; 2) Mission Cobra	1989	
4	TC-004	Little Red Hood	小紅帽, Xiǎohóngmào	1989	Published in AUS by HES Interactive in 1990.
5	TC-005	Raid	1) 突擊, Tūjī; 2) Silent Assault	1989	
6	TC-006	Twin Eagle	双鷹, Shuāng Yīng	1989	Published in 1990 by: American Video Entertainment in the U.S., HES Interactive in AUS, and Milmar in Brazil.
7	TC-007	Master Chu and the Drunkard Hu	盗帥, Dàoshuài	1989	Credited as Master Chu & the Drunkard Hu on title screen.
8	TC-008	Joyvan Kid	1) 未来小子, Wèilái Xiǎozi; 2) Metal Fighter	1989	Also known as Space Boy.
9	TC-009	Incantation	1) 蝶變, Diébiàn; 2) Galactic Crusader	1989	
10	TC-010	Mahjong Trap	四川麻將, Sìchuān Májiàng	1989	1) Published in Japan by Hacker International as Shisen Mahjong: Seifuku Hen in 1990. 2) Contains nudity.

==== Multi-game cartridges ====
#	Title	Original release	Notes
1	Funblaster Pak	1990	1) Contains: Metal Fighter, Twin Eagle, Little Red Hood, and Pipe V (credited as Pipemania). 2) Published by HES Interactive.
2	Mindblower Pak	1990	1) Contains: Galactic Crusader, Arctic Adventure, Magical Mathematics (credited as Math Quiz), and Shuǐguǒ Lí (credited as Jackpot). 2) Published by HES Interactive. 3) The game Shuǐguǒ Lí, is the only game on the list which is not released by Sachen.
3	Super Cartridge Version 1: 4-in-1	Unknown	Contains: Bingo 75, Lucky Bingo, Honey Peach, and Chess Academy.
4	Super Cartridge Version 2: 10-in-1	Unknown	1) Contains Hidden Chinese Chess, Omnibus Hearts, Fan Tan, Chinese Rummy, Max 2, Ghost Buster, 99, Change Around, Fortune Telling (Chinese), and Fortune Telling (English). 2) All games appear on The World of Card Games and Poker II except the two versions of Fortune Telling.
5	Super Cartridge Version 3: 8-in-1	Unknown	1) Contains: Jovial Race, Little Red Hood, Twin Eagle, Silent Assault, Super Pang, Mine Sweeper, Mine Sweeper II, and Mine Sweeper III. 2) The three versions of Mine Sweeper were only released on this cartridge.
6	Super Cartridge Version 4: 6-in-1	Unknown	Contains: Master Chu and the Drunkard Hu, Metal Fighter, Galactic Crusader, Auto-Upturn, Magic Cube, and Super Pang II.
7	Super Cartridge Version 5: 7-in-1	Unknown	Contains: The Penguin & Seal, Middle School English, Pyramid, Magical Mathematics, Strategist, Olympic I.Q., and Chinese Checkers.
8	Super Cartridge Version 6: 6-in-1	Unknown	Contains: Colorful Dragon, Pyramid II, Pipe V, Millionaire, Dancing Block, and Locksmith.
9	Super Cartridge Version 7: 4-in-1	Unknown	Contains: Sidewinder, Happy Pairs, Tasac, and Silver Eagle.
10	Super Cartridge Version 8: 4-in-1	Unknown	1) Contains: Final Combat, Worm Visitor, Frog Adventure, and Magical Tower. 2) All games bar Final Combat were ported from the Game Boy exclusively for this cartridge.
11	Super Cartridge Version 9: 3-in-1	Unknown	Contains: Challenge of the Dragon, Rockball, and PoPo Team.

Note: All series of Super Cartridge Version, was developed and released as Thin Chen Enterprise.

==== Others ====
- Mystical Muppet Mahjong [AKA Ti Xian Muou Majiang] — A port of Tel-Tel Mahjong.
- --Unknown-- — A TC-031 numbered series game.

==== Unreleased ====
- Bridge
- Twin Ball

=== Game Boy/Game Boy Color ===
==== List of titles as Sachen ====
#	Title	Original release	Game Boy	GB Color	Notes
1	2nd Space	1993	Yes	No	
2	Ant Soldiers	1993	Yes	No	
3	Black Forest Tale	1993	Yes	No	
4	Dan Laser	1993	Yes	No	
5	Magical Tower	1993	Yes	No	
6	Railway	1993	Yes	No	
7	Sky Ace	1993	Yes	No	
8	Worm Visitor	1993	Yes	No	
9	Zipball	1993	Yes	No	
10	Zoo Block	1993	Yes	No	
11	Crazy Burger	1994	Yes	No	
12	Explosive Brick '94	1994	Yes	No	
13	Captain Knick-Knack	1999	No	Yes	
14	Dice Square	1999	No	Yes	
15	Electron World	1999	No	Yes	
16	Jurassic Boy 2	1999	No	Yes	
17	Rocman X Gold	1999	No	Yes	An alternate version of Thunder Blast Man.
18	Snake Roy	1999	No	Yes	
19	Thunder Blast Man	1999	No	Yes	Also known as Rocman X on title screen. Although they are essentially the same game, it is worth noting that the characters in the game from Thunder Blaster Man and Rocman X are completely different, the first being the original Sachen creation from the NES version, and the second being a clone of Megaman.
20	Trouble Zone	1999	No	Yes	
21	Virus Attack	1999	No	Yes	
22	Beast Fighter	2000	No	Yes	
23	Gedou Zhanlue 2002	2002	No	Yes	An RPG and strategy game with elements of The King of Fighters.
24	Street Heroes	Unknown	No	Yes	Credited as Street Hero on the package.

==== List of titles as Commin ====
#	Title	Original release	Game Boy	Game Boy Color	Notes
1	A-Force: Armour Force	1993	Yes	No	
2	Arctic Zone	1993	Yes	No	
3	Bomb Disposer	1993	Yes	No	
4	Duck Adventures	1993	Yes	No	
5	Hong Kong Mahjung	1993	Yes	No	
6	Japan's Mahjong	1993	Yes	No	
7	Magic Maze	1993	Yes	No	
8	Store Tris 2	1993	Yes	No	
9	Street Rider	1993	Yes	No	A Game Boy version of Jovial Race.
10	Taiwan Mahjong	1993	Yes	No	
11	Trap & Turn	1993	Yes	No	
12	Vex Block	1993	Yes	No	
13	Deep: Final Mission	1994	Yes	No	
14	Pile Wonder	1999	No	Yes	
15	Puppet Knight	1999	No	Yes	
16	Suleiman's Treasure	1999	No	Yes	

==== Multi-game cartridges ====
#	Serial number	Title	Original release	Game Boy	GB Color	Notes
1	4B-001	4-in-1 Version 1	1997	Yes	No	Contains: Street Rider, Vex Block, Trap & Turn, and Duck Adventures.
2	4B-002	4-in-1 Version 2	1997	Yes	No	Contains: Virus Attack, Electron World, Dice Square, and Trouble Zone.
3	4B-003	4-in-1 Version 3	???	Yes	No	1) Also known as Commin 4-in-1. 2) Contains: Taiwan's Mahjong, Japan's Mahjong, Hong Kong's Mahjung, and Store Tris 2.
4	4B-004	4-in-1 Version 4	1997	Yes	No	Contains: Pile Wonder, Snake Roy, Suleiman's Treasure, and Puppet Knight.
5	4B-005	4-in-1 Version 5	???	Yes	No	Contains: Arctic Zone, Magical Tower, Railway, and Worm Visitor.
6	4B-006	4-in-1 Version 6	???	Yes	No	Contains: Bomb Disposer, A-Force: Armour Force, Black Forest Tale, and 2nd Space.
7	4B-007	4-in-1 Version 7	???	Yes	No	Contains: Ant Soldiers, Dan Laser, Sky Ace, and Zoo Block.
8	4B-008	4-in-1 Version 8	1997	Yes	No	Contains: Captain Knick-Knack, Flea War, Explosive Brick, and Magic Maze.
9	4B-009	4-in-1 Version 9	???	Yes	No	Contains: Zipball, Small Gorilla, Crazy Burger, and Deep: Final Mission.
10	8B-001	Color 8-in-1	1999	No	Yes	Contains: Zipball, Deep: Final Mission, Crazy Burger, Small Gorilla, Street Rider, Vex Block, Trap & Turn, and Duck Adventures.
11	8B-002	Color 8-in-1	1999	No	Yes	Contains: Virus Attack, Electron World, Trouble Zone, Dice Square, Pile Wonder, Snake Roy, Puppet Knight, and Suleiman's Treasure.
12	8B-003	Color 8-in-1	1999	No	Yes	Contains: Arctic Zone, Magical Tower, Railway, Worm Visitor, Bomb Disposer, 2nd Space, Black Forest Tale, and A-Force: Armour Force.
13	8B-004	Color 8-in-1	1999	No	Yes	Contains: Ant Soldiers, Sky Ace, Dan Laser, Zoo Block, Captain Knick-Knack, Flea War, Explosive Brick, and Magic Maze.
14	31B-001	31-in-1 Mighty Mix	Unknown	No	Yes	1) Contains all of their games developed as Sachen for the Game Boy/Game Boy Color, as well as a few more: Thunder Blastman (sic), Jurassic Boy 2, Street Rider, Bomb Disposer, Dan Laser, Vex Block, Explosivew Brick (sic), Small Gorilla, Trap & Turn, Pile Wonder, Arctic Zone, Zoo Block, Magic Maze, Magical Tower, Virus Attack, Electron World, Truble Zone (sic), Dice Square, Railway, Worm Visitor, 2nd Space, Black Foresttale (sic), A-Force, Skyace, War Flea, Crazy Burger, Deep, Zipball, Captain Knick, Ant Soldiers, and Duck Adventures. 2) The menu font does not contain the characters '&' or '-'. They are displayed as ' ' (space).

=== Sega Genesis/Mega Drive ===
Both two games were developed and copyrighted as Thin Chen Enterprise co., as seen on the title screen. However, the name Sachen also appears on the opening screen.

#	Title	AKA title	Original release	Notes
1	Competition Mahjong	Shizen Mahjong	Unknown	
2	Queen of Poker Club		Unknown	6 card games in 1.

=== Watara Supervision ===
All games, both as Thin Chen Enterprise that as Sachen, were all made in 1992 with the only exception of Kung-Fu Street, which was made in 1993.

#	Title	Brand name	Release year
1	Balloon Fight	Thin Chen Enterprise	1992
2	Chinese Checkers	Sachen	1992
3	Dancing Block	Thin Chen Enterprise	1992
4	Final Combat	Thin Chen Enterprise	1992
5	Galactic Crusader	Sachen	1992
6	Galaxy Fighter	Thin Chen Enterprise	1992
7	Happy Pairs	Sachen	1992
8	Happy Race	Sachen	1992
9	Hero Hawk	Thin Chen Enterprise	1992
10	John Adventure	Sachen	1992
11	Kabi-Island: Gold in Island	Thin Chen Enterprise	1992
12	Kung-Fu Street	Thin Chen Enterprise	1993
13	Magincross	Thin Chen Enterprise	1992
14	Penguin Hideout	Thin Chen Enterprise	1992
15	PoPo Team	Sachen	1992
16	Pyramid	Thin Chen Enterprise	1992
17	Super Pang	Sachen	1992
18	Super Kong	Thin Chen Enterprise	1992
19	Tasac 2010	Thin Chen Enterprise	1992
20	Thunder Shooting	Thin Chen Enterprise	1992

=== Mega Duck ===
Each Mega Duck/Cougar Boy game is similarly labeled as the same games were marketed for both systems. The notation MDxxx is used for Mega Duck Games, and the notation CBxxx for a Cougar Boy Games. A MD002 is exactly the same game as the CB002, even to a point that some "Cougar Boy" games start up with a Mega Duck logo.

All of the games released for the Mega Duck were subsequently available on the Game Boy.

Background shading indicates games that have a Cougar Boy Variant.
Serial number followed by a/b/c/d/e indicates included games in # cartridge.

Serial number	Title	Brand Name	Release year
002	Street Rider	Commin	1993
003	Bomb Disposer	Commin	1993
004	Vex	Commin	1993
005	Suleuman's Treasure	Commin	1993
006	Arctic Zone	Commin	1993
007	Magic Maze	Commin	1993
008	Puppet Knight	Commin	1993
009	Trap and Turn	Commin	1993
010	Pile Wonder	Commin	1993
011	Captain Knick Knack	Sachen	1993
013	Black Forest tale	Commin	1993
014	Armour Force	Commin	1993
018	Snake Roy	Sachen	1993
019	Railway	Sachen	1993
021	Beast Fighter	Sachen	1993
026	Ant Soldiers	Sachen	1993
028	2nd Space	Sachen	1993
029	Magic Tower	Sachen	1993
030	Worm Visitor	Sachen	1993
031	Duck Adventures	Commin	1993
035	Four in One	Sachen	1993
035a	Virus Atack	Sachen	1993
035b	Electron World	Sachen	1993
035c	Trouble Zone	Sachen	1993
035d	Dice Block	Sachen	1993
036	Commin Five in one	Commin	1993
036a	Store Tris 1	Commin	1993
036b	Store Tris 2	Commin	1993
036c	Taiwan Mahjong	Commin	1993
036d	Japan Mahjong	Commin	1993
036e	Hong Kong Mahjung	Commin	1993
037	Zipball	Sachen	1993

== See also ==
- Multicart
- Caltron
- Color Dreams
- NTDEC
- Hummer Team
- Home Entertainment Suppliers
- Makon Soft
