= Watara Supervision =

Monochrome handheld game console

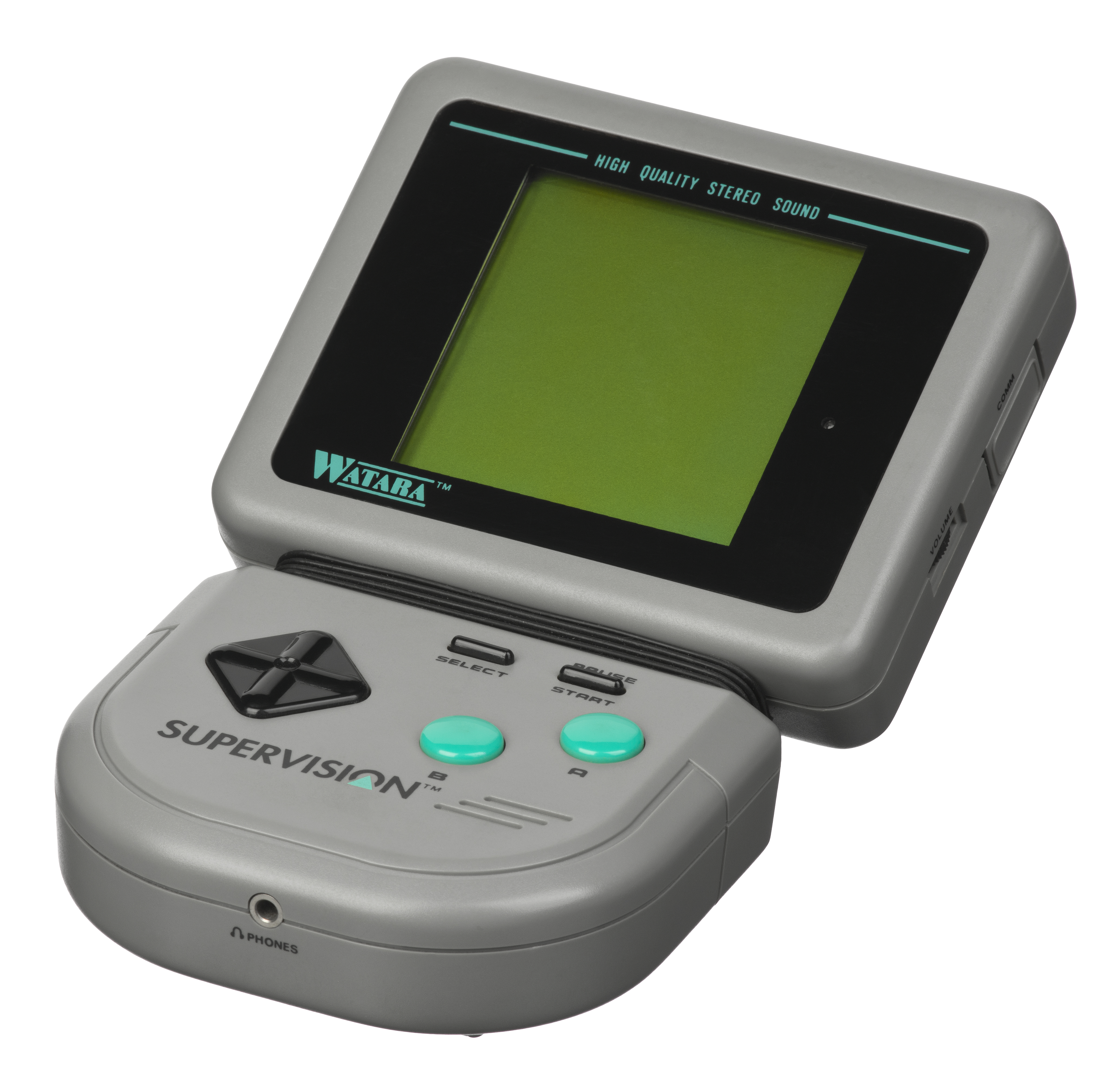
- The Watara Supervision with tilting screen
- Manufacturer: Watara
- Type: Handheld game console
- Generation: Fourth generation
- Released: 1992
- Introductory price: US$49.95 (equivalent to $110 in 2025)
- Media: ROM cartridge
- CPU: 8-bit 65SC02 @ 4 MHz
- Display: 160×160 pixel resolution, 4 shades of grey
- Sound: Mono speaker Headphone jack
- Power: 4 × AA batteries or 6V AC/DC adapter
- Related: Game Boy

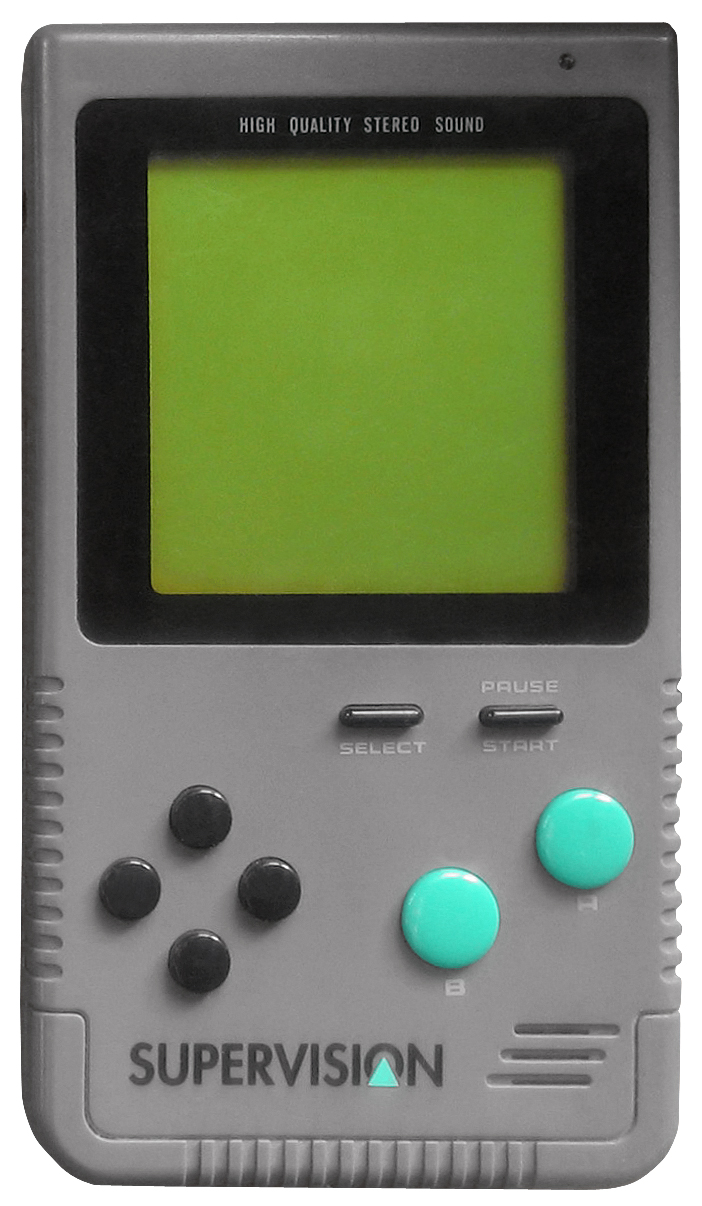
The Supervision model released without the tilting screen

The Watara Supervision, also known as the QuickShot Supervision in the UK, is a monochrome handheld game console, originating from Asia, and introduced in 1992 as a cut-price competitor for Nintendo's Game Boy. It came packaged with a game called Crystball, which is similar to Breakout. One unique feature of the Supervision was that it could be linked up to a television via an official accessory. Games played in this way would display in four colors, much like Nintendo's Super Game Boy add-on for the SNES. A full color TV link was also in the works, but because of the Supervision's failure to make a major impression among gamers it was cancelled, along with the games which were in development for it.

Though the machine garnered some attention at launch (mainly due to the low price for the machine and its games, which many felt might enable it to make inroads into Nintendo's market share) it was ultimately unsuccessful in unseating the Game Boy from its position as the world's most popular handheld. Reasons commonly cited are the poor quality screen which was prone to blurring and made following the action difficult, a general lack of games and the simplistic nature of those that were released.

Yet another problem was that most of the games that were available were developed in Taiwan or Hong Kong, meaning that fans of big-name Western and Japanese developers were underwhelmed by the apparent lack of support from these companies. Only a tiny handful of games were developed by third parties, including Sachen and the British developer B.I.T.S. Up against Nintendo's list of popular franchises (Zelda, Mario, Metroid) and those of its third parties (Castlevania, Mega Man) - all of which eventually surfaced on the Game Boy - the Supervision's games were of little interest to most.

== Marketing ==
The Watara Supervision's main marketing point was its low price; the Supervision was US$49.95 in 1992 while the Game Boy was US$89.99. Games for the Supervision were also much cheaper than Game Boy games, and advertisements emphasized this price difference, with one British ad for the Supervision calling it "the affordable hand-held games machine". It was also bundled with headphones, batteries, and a Breakout clone titled Crystball.

To keep their costs down, Watara farmed out the international marketing and distribution to third parties leading to various versions:

- Watara Supervision: sold in the United States, Canada, Colombia, Spain, Italy and Mexico. Tiltable screen configuration.
- Quickshot Supervision (QS-800): sold in the UK, Greece by the well-known joystick brand. Tiltable screen configuration.
- Hartung Supervision (SV-100): sold in Germany and Netherlands.
- 泰可BOY (Tiger Boy): sold in Taiwan and Hong Kong by Tai-Kerr Trading Co.
- Audio Sonic Supervision (GB-1000, GB-2000): sold in Italy, France and other European countries. There are two known models. The GB-2000 looks like a Gameboy and the GB-1000 looks like the Watara, but without the name in the lower left corner of the screen.
- Vini Supervision: sold in Denmark and distributed by Vini Spil. Both models were also sold (the tilting one as model #9205).
- Videojet Supervision: sold in France.
- Magnum Supervision: sold in the United States and Europe by Magnum International. Same appearance as the Videojet Supervision in three different housing colors: Gray, Yellow and Green.
- Electrolab Supervision: sold in Argentina by the Electrolab brand.
- Hypervision Hyberboy SW: another version sold in Argentina, marketed by Honson Games.

In the mid 1990s, the Supervision was once offered as a final prize on the television game show Legends of the Hidden Temple (as well as Masters of the Maze). It was also offered as a prize on the premiere of the similarly short-lived The New Price is Right in 1994.

Quickshot's UK version of the Supervision was heavily featured for a time on ITV's gaming show Bad Influence! Presenter Violet Berlin could be seen playing a Supervision in many of the show's publicity photos.

== History ==
A prototype of the Supervision was exhibited at the Winter Consumer Electronics Show in 1992. The Supervision was released before Christmas 1992 with eighteen launch titles, and it was advertised that fifty games were released by November 1992. The Supervision's game library was criticized for being 'too simplistic' compared to that of other consoles, which outweighed the value of their budget price, which ranged from US$8.95 to US$14.95 per game. One critic from Electronic Games said in respect to the Supervision that "it is still possible to be disappointed in a game that costs under fifteen dollars". Soon after the Supervision's release, the Game Boy Basic packaging option was announced, which made the Game Boy more affordable, costing only ten dollars more than the Supervision; this undermined the Supervision's 'budget' marketing strategy.

Similar to the functionality of the Super Game Boy, the Supervision can be connected to a television to allow for a larger screen to play on. A peripheral that would add color support to games was planned for release in the latter half of 1993, but was never released. The Supervision was distributed in the US by Goldnation, and in France by AudioSonic. More third-party games were planned for release for the system in 1993 but never materialized, including movie licences such as Rambo and Terminator.

== Technical specifications ==
- CPU: 8-bit 65C02 processor, running at 4 MHz
- Screen: 61 mm × 61 mm (2.37 inches × 2.37 inches), 160 × 160 pixels, 4 greys LCD. There was no hardware video acceleration, graphics had to be drawn by software to a framebuffer.
- Sound: 2 Tonal and 1 Noise Channel plus additional audio DMA stereo output channel. Built-in speaker and headphone jack with stereo earphones included.
- Power: 4 × AA batteries or 6V AC/DC adapter
- Communication port: Two Player Link using DE-9 connector.
- Cartridge port
- Controls for 1 Player
- TV adapter (optional)
- Tiltable Screen (2 positions)

== List of games ==
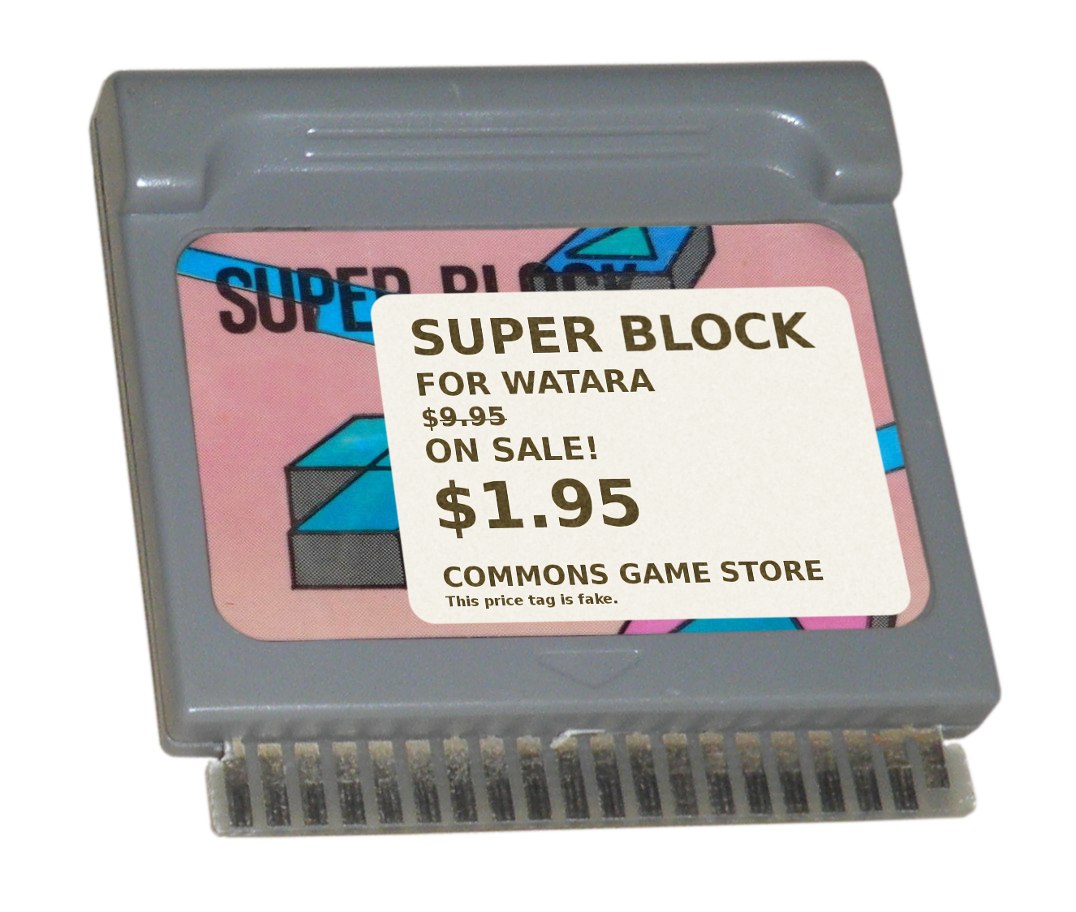
Watara Supervision cartridge

More than sixty games were released for this console:

| # | Title | Developer(s) | Release year |
|---|---|---|---|
| 1 | Alien | Watara | 1992 |
| 2 | Balloon Fight | Thin Chen Enterprise | 1992 |
| 3 | Block Buster | Watara | 1992 |
| 4 | Brain Power | Watara | 1992 |
| 5 | Bubble World | Bon Treasure | 1992 |
| 6 | Carrier | Watara | 1992 |
| 7 | Cave Wonders | Bon Treasure | 1992 |
| 8 | Challenger Tank | Watara | 1992 |
| 9 | Chimera | Watara | 1992 |
| 10 | Chinese Checkers | Sachen | 1992 |
| 11 | Classic Casino | Bon Treasure | 1993 |
| 12 | Climber | Bon Treasure | 1992 |
| 13 | Cross High | GTC | 1992 |
| 14 | Crystball | Watara | 1991 |
| 15 | Dancing Block | Thin Chen Enterprise | 1992 |
| 16 | Delta Hero | Bon Treasure | 1992 |
| 17 | Dream World | Bon Treasure | 1992 |
| 18 | Eagle Plan | GTC | 1991 |
| 19 | Earth Defender | Bon Treasure | 1992 |
| 20 | Fatal Craft | Bon Treasure | 1992 |
| 21 | Final Combat | Thin Chen Enterprise | 1992 |
| 22 | Galactic Crusader | Sachen | 1992 |
| 23 | Galaxy Fighter | Thin Chen Enterprise | 1992 |
| 24 | Grand Prix | Bon Treasure | 1992 |
| 25 | Happy Pairs | Sachen | 1992 |
| 26 | Happy Race | Sachen | 1992 |
| 27 | Hash Block | GTC | 1991 |
| 28 | Hero Hawk | Thin Chen Enterprise | 1992 |
| 29 | Hero Kid | Watara | 1992 |
| 30 | Honey Bee | Bon Treasure | 1992 |
| 31 | Jacky Lucky | Bon Treasure | 1992 |
| 32 | Jaguar Bomber | Bon Treasure | 1992 |
| 33 | John Adventure | Sachen | 1992 |
| 34 | Journey to the West | Watara | 1992 |
| 35 | Juggler | Bon Treasure | 1992 |
| 36 | Kabi-Island: Gold in Island | Thin Chen Enterprise | 1992 |
| 37 | Kitchen War | Bon Treasure | 1992 |
| 38 | Kung-Fu Street | Thin Chen Enterprise | 1993 |
| 39 | Linear Racing | Watara | 1992 |
| 40 | Ma Jong | Watara | 1992 |
| 41 | Magincross | Thin Chen Enterprise | 1992 |
| 42 | Matta Blatta | B.I.T.S. | 1992 |
| 43 | Olympic Trials | Divide By Zero/B.I.T.S. | 1992 |
| 44 | P-52 Sea Battle | Watara | 1992 |
| 45 | Pacboy & Mouse | Watara | 1992 |
| 46 | Pacific Battle | Bon Treasure | 1992 |
| 47 | Penguin Hideout | Thin Chen Enterprise | 1992 |
| 48 | Police Bust | Bon Treasure | 1992 |
| 49 | PoPo Team | Sachen | 1992 |
| 50 | Pyramid | Thin Chen Enterprise | 1992 |
| 51 | Recycle Design | Bon Treasure | 1992 |
| 52 | Scaffolder | Bon Treasure | 1992 |
| 53 | Soccer Champion | Watara | 1992 |
| 54 | Sonny Xpress! | Watara | 1992 |
| 55 | Space Fighter | Bon Treasure | 1992 |
| 56 | Sssnake | B.I.T.S. | 1992 |
| 57 | Super Block | Bon Treasure | 1992 |
| 58 | Super Kong | Thin Chen Enterprise | 1992 |
| 59 | Super Pang | Sachen | 1992 |
| 60 | Tasac 2010 | Thin Chen Enterprise | 1992 |
| 61 | Tennis Pro '92 | B.I.T.S. | 1992 |
| 62 | Thunder Shooting | Thin Chen Enterprise | 1992 |
| 63 | Treasure Hunter | Bon Treasure | 1992 |
| 64 | Untouchable | Bon Treasure | 1992 |
| 65 | Witty Cat | Bon Treasure | 1992 |

=== Multi-game titles ===
- Block Buster/Cross High [2-in-1] (1992)
- Hash Block/Eagle Plan [2-in-1] (1992; developed by Bon Treasure)
- Hash Block/Jacky Lucky/Challenger Tank/Brain Power [4-in-1] (1992)

=== Homebrew ===
As of 2020, the first aftermarket game Assembloids by PriorArt is available for the Supervision.

== Preservation ==
Like many consoles, the Watara Supervision has lived on through emulation (see MESS). Cowering's Good Tools includes a tool called GoodSV, which catalogues 69 Supervision games as of version 3.27.
