= The Game of Life (disambiguation) =

The Game of Life, also known as Life, is an 1860 board game by Milton Bradley.

Game of Life also often refers to:

- Conway's Game of Life, in mathematics, a cellular automaton

Game of Life or The Game of Life may also refer to:

== Games ==
- Life Game, the 1968 Japanese version of the board game
- The Game of Life Card Game, a 2002 card game based on the board game
- The Game of Life: Twists & Turns, a 2007 board game variant of the original game

== Other ==
- Game of Life (film) (2007, 2011), a film originally titled Oranges
- The Game of Life (TV programme), a 1986 ABC programme
- "The Game of Life", a song by Scorpions from their album Humanity: Hour I
- The Game of Life (1922 film), a 1922 film by G. B. Samuelson
- The Game of Life (album), a 2007 music album by Arsonists Get All the Girls
- The Game of Life (book), a 1925 book by Florence Scovel Shinn
- Da Game of Life (film), a 1998 direct-to-video short film starring Snoop Dogg
- Da Game of Life, a 2001 rap music album by Totally Insane

== See also ==
- Evolution: The Game of Intelligent Life
- Life simulation game
