= Reuben Klamer =

American inventor (1922–2021)

- Born: June 20, 1922; Canton, Ohio, U.S.
- Died: September 14, 2021 (aged 99); La Jolla, California, U.S.
- Education: George Washington University, Ohio State University, University of Michigan
- Occupation: Inventor
- Known for: Creating and co-designer of The Game of Life board game for Milton Bradley

Reuben Klamer (June 20, 1922 – September 14, 2021) was an American designer, developer, inventor, entrepreneur, and sales and marketing executive, best known for creating and designing the modern version of the classic Milton Bradley (now Hasbro) board game The Game of Life.

The Game of Life was marketed in 59 countries and translated into 26 languages. It is estimated that 70 million copies have been sold, and it is the second most popular board game, only to Monopoly.

Although best known for his work in the toy and gaming industries, Klamer held credits in numerous diverse industries, including textiles, plastics, aviation, publishing, music television and film.

== Early life ==
Klamer was born in 1922 in Canton, Ohio, to Romanian Jewish emigrants Joseph Klamer and Rachel Levenson. He studied ancient and modern history at George Washington University in Washington D.C. and earned a Bachelor of Science in marketing from Ohio State University. He completed postgraduate work in engineering at the University of Michigan.

He enlisted in the U.S. Navy midshipman school at Northwestern University in 1943 and served in the South Pacific.

== Early career ==
Post WWII, he worked as a marketing developer for an air cargo company, designing his first invention for air freight travel before starting his own advertising agency, The Klamer Company

== Toys and gaming industry ==
Klamer's career started with the Ideal Toy Company in 1949. He created the Art Linkletter Spin-A-Hoop (to compete with the Wham-O hula hoop), Gaylord the Walking Dog, and Busy Blocks. He also created the Fisher-Price Preschool Trainer Skates.

== Television ==
Klamer was approached by the producers of The Man From U.N.C.L.E. to design a special weapon for the show's secret agents. He produced a toy version for Ideal.

Impressed with Klamer's work, and under pressure from network executives to make his show more "action packed," Star Trek producer Gene Roddenberry enlisted Klamer to design "a really big gun." He built the phaser rifle used in the episode "Where No Man Has Gone Before."

He created the Pink Panther Travelling Show Car, build on an oldsmobile chassis for the Pink Panther Cartoon Series

== The Game of Life ==
In June 1959, Klamer pitched an art center concept to Milton Bradley that featured their crayons and finger paints. The company declined, but Milton Bradley president James Shea, Sr., asked Klamer to develop a game in celebration of the hundredth anniversary of Milton Bradley Company. After months of development, Klamer unveiled The Game of Life at the 1960 American International Toy Fair in the Milton Bradley showroom. Spurred by the endorsement of TV personality Art Linkletter, the game went on to sell more than fifty million copies.

== Death ==
Klamer died on September 14, 2021, at the age of 99.

== Awards and honors ==
Association	Year	Award
Hasbro	2000	Hasbro Inventors Hall of Fame
Toy Industry Hall of Fame	2005	Inductee
TAGIE Award	2009	Lifetime Achievement Award
State Government	2003	OHIO Citizen of Honour
Ohio State University	2011	Fisher College of Business Alumni Award for Entrepreneurship
Fisher College of Business	2012	Dean's Distinguished Fellowship Award
OSU 's Science and TechnologyInsights	2019	Great Ohio State Inventor
