= Travellers' Tour Through the United States =

1822 board game

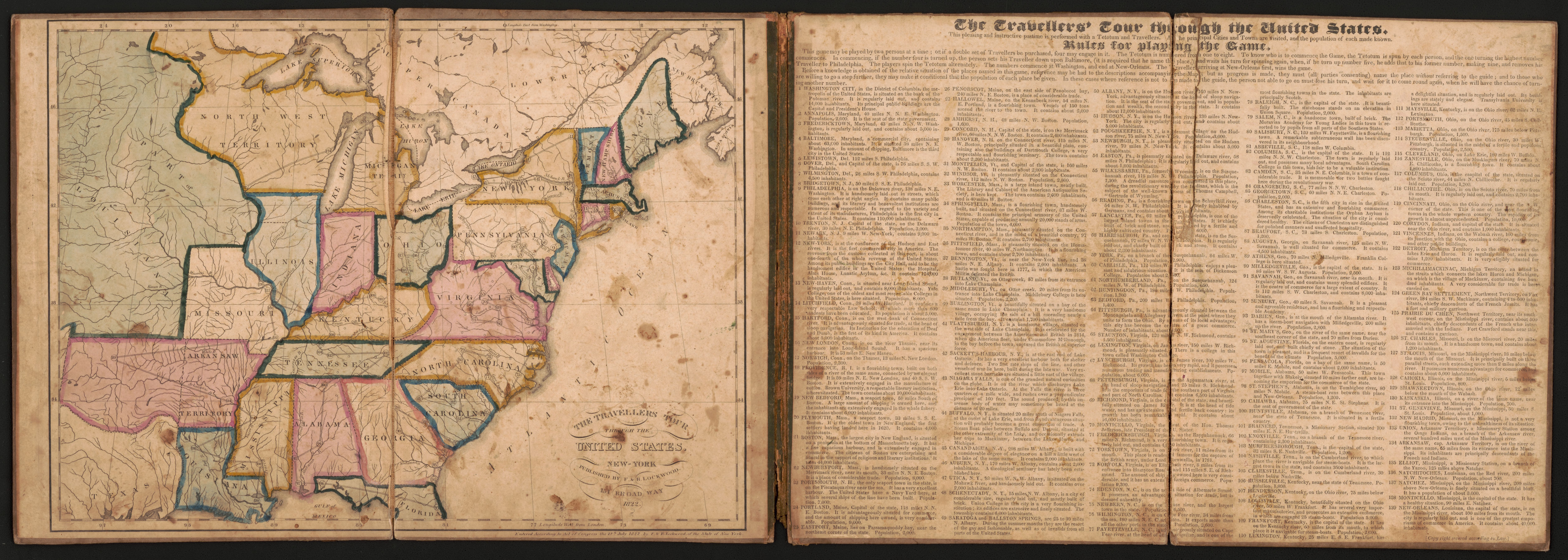
- The game board and instructions
- Publishers: F. & R. Lockwood
- Publication: 1822; 203 years ago
- Genres: Geography, educational
- Players: 2–4

Travellers' Tour Through the United States is a geographical board game published in 1822, thought to be the first board game produced in the United States.

The educational game was published by F. & R. Lockwood, New York-based cartographers. The game consisted of a map, which players would traverse via 139 municipalities that they had to correctly identify to move forward, determining how far they could move with a teetotum. In an advanced version of the game, players were also required to name the populations of the cities and towns they landed on, and the game also offered trivia about each locality. The winner was the first player to reach New Orleans.

Travellers' Tour was also the first board game based on a map of the United States. At the time, the nation's westernmost states were Louisiana and Missouri, the latter of which had only gained statehood a year prior to the game's publication.

The Mansion of Happiness (1843) was previously thought to be the oldest American board game, before Travellers' Tour was discovered in the American Antiquarian Society's archives in 1991. Mansion of Happiness was also based on a previously extant British game, while Travellers' Tour was a wholly American creation.

A sister game, Travellers' Tour Through Europe, was released a few months after. This was later followed by Travellers' Tour Round the World.

A new version of the game was published in 1842. Along with an updated and expanded city list, this version has more complex gameplay, with certain cities requiring the player landing on them to move ahead or back on the board.
