= RPG Jinsei Game =

1993 video game

- Developer: Takara
- Publisher: Takara
- Composer: Yusuke Takahama
- Platform: Nintendo Family Computer
- Release: JP: November 26, 1993
- Genres: Adventure; Life simulation game Board game
- Modes: Single-player, multiplayer

RPG Jinsei Game (ＲＰＧ人生ゲーム; "RPG Life Game") is a Japan-only role-playing game for the Family Computer that is similar to Jinsei Game, which is the Japanese version of The Game of Life.

== Gameplay ==
This screenshot is showing a sample game where a player-character named Nora must track down UFOs as a part of her life story.

The object is to explore a city full of stores, places of employment, and learning places. Starting from home, the player must earn money and statistics in order to unlock the better features of the game.

Unlike most games based on the Jinsei Game series, RPG Jinsei Game does not use a spinner system. Instead, the controller pad is used for movement and random encounters are featured like in Dragon Quest. The player can also talk to strangers, who might either give advice or do something malevolent to the player character. As in the Game of Life board game, the player has to choose from a range of careers such as musician, photographer, and even professional wrestler. Most of these tasks are mundane, while one of the quests involves chasing down unidentified flying objects. Buildings that are crucial to the quest (other than shops and learning places) can be fully explored; otherwise the player simply talks to the resident.

Fights can occur like in a standard role-playing game. However, the player's stats are used instead of hit points and magic points.
