= Bakushō Jinsei 64: Mezase! Resort Ō =

1998 video game

- Developer(s): Taito
- Publisher(s): Taito
- Platform(s): Nintendo 64
- Release: JP: December 24, 1998
- Genre(s): Board game
- Mode(s): Single-player, multiplayer

Bakushō Jinsei 64: Mezase! Resort Ō (爆笑人生64 めざせ!リゾート王 (Life of Explosive Laughter 64: Aim to be Resort King!)) is an interactive board game for the Nintendo 64 loosely based on The Game of Life. It was released only in Japan in 1998.
