= Jinsei Game =

Japanese board game

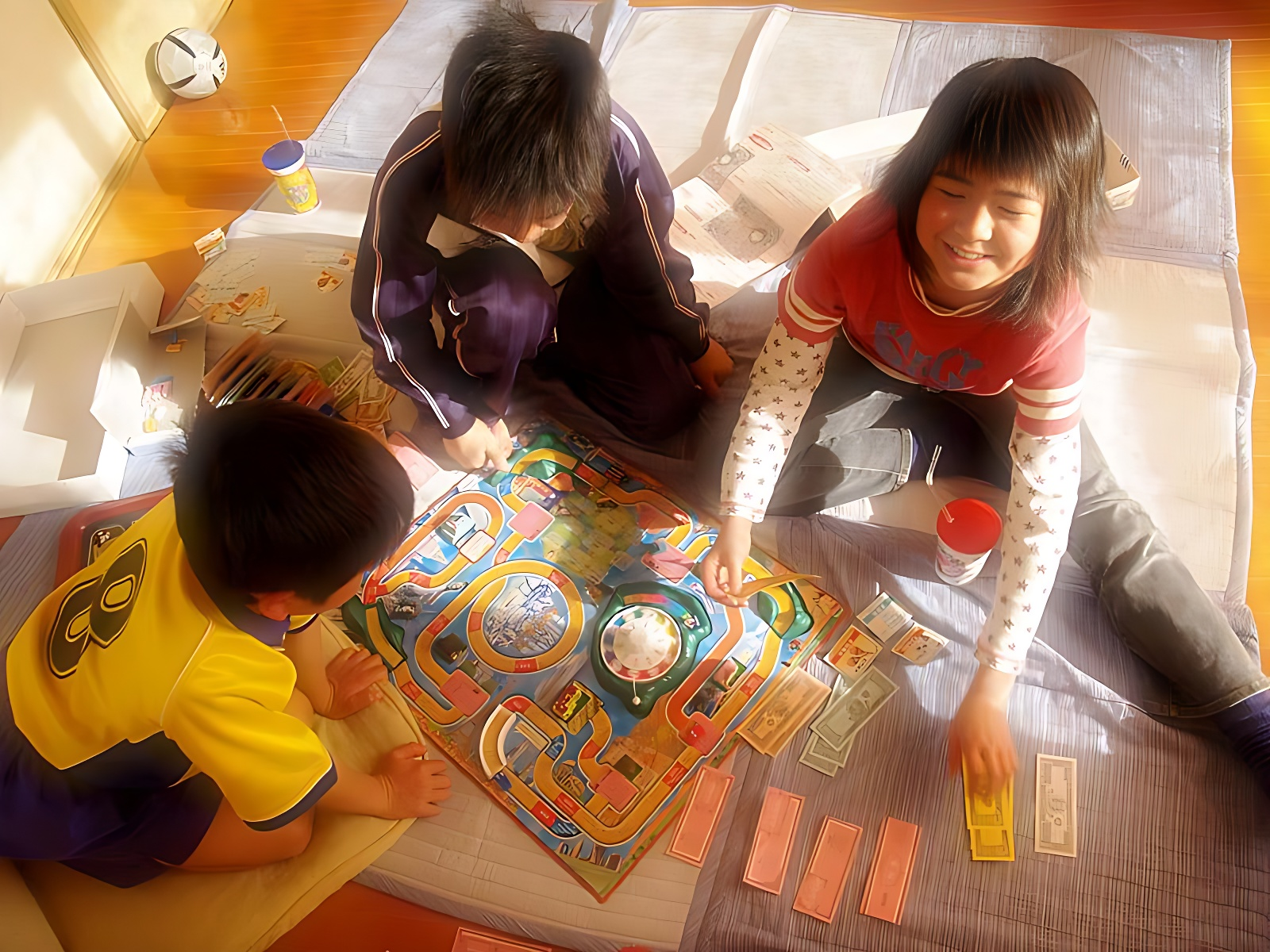
Children playing the Jinsei Game

Jinsei Game (人生ゲーム; "Life Game") is the Japanese version of the board game that is called The Game of Life in North America. Unlike The Game of Life, the player starts in their toddler years and has to go to elementary school, junior high school, and high school before being allowed to either go to university or start their career. However, the board game has been updated numerous times like its North American counterpart. It was released in 1968 by toy company called Takara. It has been enjoyed by Japanese boys and girls for generations.

The game has been adapted for the Famicom, the Super Famicom, the Game Boy, the Saturn, the PlayStation, the Nintendo 64, the Game Boy Color, the Dreamcast, the Game Boy Advance, the PlayStation 2, the GameCube, the Nintendo DS, the Wii, and the Nintendo Switch. Most of them are considered to be electronic board games while RPG Jinsei Game functions more like a role playing game with a post-industrial theme.

== Video game adaptations ==
=== Famicom ===
- Bakushou!! Jinsei Gekijou (1988)
- Bakushou!! Star Monomane Shittenou (1990)
- Bakushou!! Jinsei Gekijou 2 (1991)
- Bakushou!! Jinsei Gekijou 3 (1991)
- Aa Yakyū Jinsei Itchokusen (1992)
- RPG Jinsei Game (1993)

=== Super Famicom ===
- Daibakushou Jinsei Gekijou (1992)
- Daibakushou Jinsei Gekijou - Dokidoki Seishun (1993)
- Daibakushou Jinsei Gekijou - Ooedo Nikki (1994)
- Daibakushou Jinsei Gekijou - Zukkoke SalaryMan Hen (1994)
- Super Jinsei Game (1994)
- Super Jinsei Game 2 (1995)
- Super Jinsei Game 3 (1996)

=== Game Boy ===
- Jinsei Game Densetsu (1991)
- Jinsei Game (1995)

=== Sega Saturn ===
- DX Jinsei Game (1995)
- DX Jinsei Game II (1997)

=== PlayStation ===
- DX Jinsei Game (1996)
- DX Jinsei Game II (1997)
- Sakumashiki Jinsei Game (1998)
- Quiz Darakeno Jinsei Game (1999)
- DX Jinsei Game III (1999)
- Oshigoto-shiki Jinsei Game: Mezase Shokugyou King (2000)
- DX Jinsei Game IV (2001)
- Quiz Darakeno Jinsei Game Dai-2-kai! (2002)
- DX Jinsei Game V (2002)

=== Nintendo 64 ===
- Bakushō Jinsei 64: Mezase! Resort Ō (1998)
- Jinsei Game 64 (1999)

=== Game Boy Color ===
- DX Jinsei Game
- Jinsei Game Tomodachi Takusan Tsukurou yo! (1999)

=== Dreamcast ===
- Jinsei Game for Dreamcast (2000)

=== Game Boy Advance ===
- Jinsei Game Advance (2002)

=== Playstation 2 ===
- EX Jinsei Game (2002)
- EX Jinsei Game II (2003)
- New Jinsei Game (2004)

=== GameCube ===
- Special Jinsei Game (2003)

=== Nintendo DS ===
- Jinsei Game DS (2006)
- Jinsei Game Q DS: Heisei no Dekigoto (2007)
- Jinsei Game Q DS: Showa no Dekigoto (2007)
- Jinsei Game (2009)

=== Wii ===
- Jinsei Game Wii (2007)
- Jinsei Game Wii EX (2008)
- Jinsei Game: Happy Family (2010)
- Jinsei Game Happy Family Gotouchi Neta Zouryou Shiage (2011)

=== WiiWare ===
- Jinsei Game (2009)
- Jinsei Game: Happy Step (2010)

=== Nintendo Switch ===
- Jinsei Game for Nintendo Switch (2023)

== See also ==
- Bakushou!! Jinsei Gekijou series
- Super Jinsei Game series
