= The Mansion of Happiness =

Board game

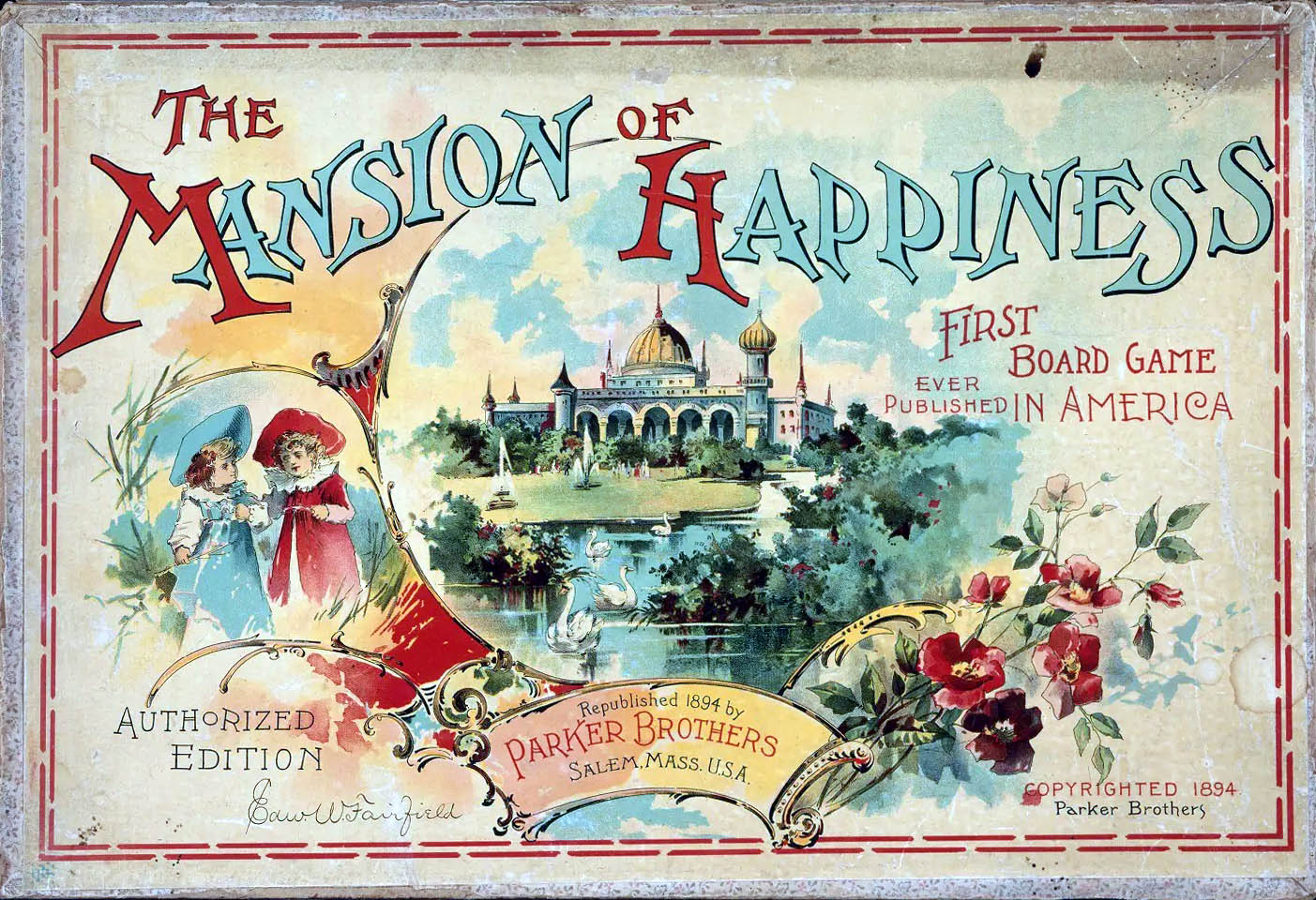
- Cover of The Mansion of Happiness published by Parker Brothers in 1894
- Designers: George Fox
- Publishers: Laurie and Whittles (1800–1843); W. & S.B. Ives (1843–1860); Henry P. Ives (1860–1866); Parker Brothers (1886–1926)
- Publication: 1800; 226 years ago
- Years active: 1800–1926
- Genres: Board game
- Languages: English

The Mansion of Happiness: An Instructive Moral and Entertaining Amusement is a children's board game inspired by Christian ethics. Players race about a 67-space spiral track depicting virtues and vices with their goal being the Mansion of Happiness at track's end. Instructions upon virtue spaces advance players toward the goal while those upon vice spaces force them to retreat.

The Mansion of Happiness was designed by George Fox, a children's author and game designer in England. The first edition, printed in gold ink "containing real gold" using one copperplate engraving and black ink using a second copper plate engraving, produced a few hundred copies. Water coloring was used to complete the game board, making a brilliant, colorful, and expensive product fit for the nobility. Later in 1800, a second edition was printed, probably for rich but common folk. Only one copper plate was used to print black ink and no water coloring was used. The game must have become quite popular in England as a third edition was printed using two copper plates, one for black, and the second for green lines to indicate blank spaces. Water colors were added to make a beautiful product. Laurie and Whittle published all three editions in 1800. On all three editions George Fox was listed as the inventor and the game honored the Duchess of York. In the first edition, gold not only added color and price but homage to royalty. In all three editions, the paper was glued to linen so it could fold up and be inserted into a heavy attractively labeled cardboard case. The game influenced later games, such as The Checkered Game of Life.

== Design and publication ==
The Mansion of Happiness was published in many forms, first in England, then in the United States. It was designed by George Fox and published as a linen game board that folded into a hard cover booklet. Laurie and Whittles published three editions of the game in 1800, and a Laurie relative published it in England again in 1851.

It was first published in the United States by W. & S.B. Ives in Salem, Massachusetts on November 25, 1843. Their game was a folding game board with a cloth and cardboard pocket attached to the bottom of the game board along its edge. In the pocket were the rules, implements, and teetotum. Its teetotum was an ivory dowel sharpened to a point at the bottom end inserted in an octagonal ivory plate. This type of teetotum was referred to as a pin and plate teetotum.

When board games were published in 1843, morality was the most important aspect of the game. Since dice were called "the bones of the Devil" because they were used to determine which Roman soldier would keep Christ's loin cloth, teetotums were used instead. There were many different printings of Ives' The Mansion of Happiness.

FIRST EDITION:

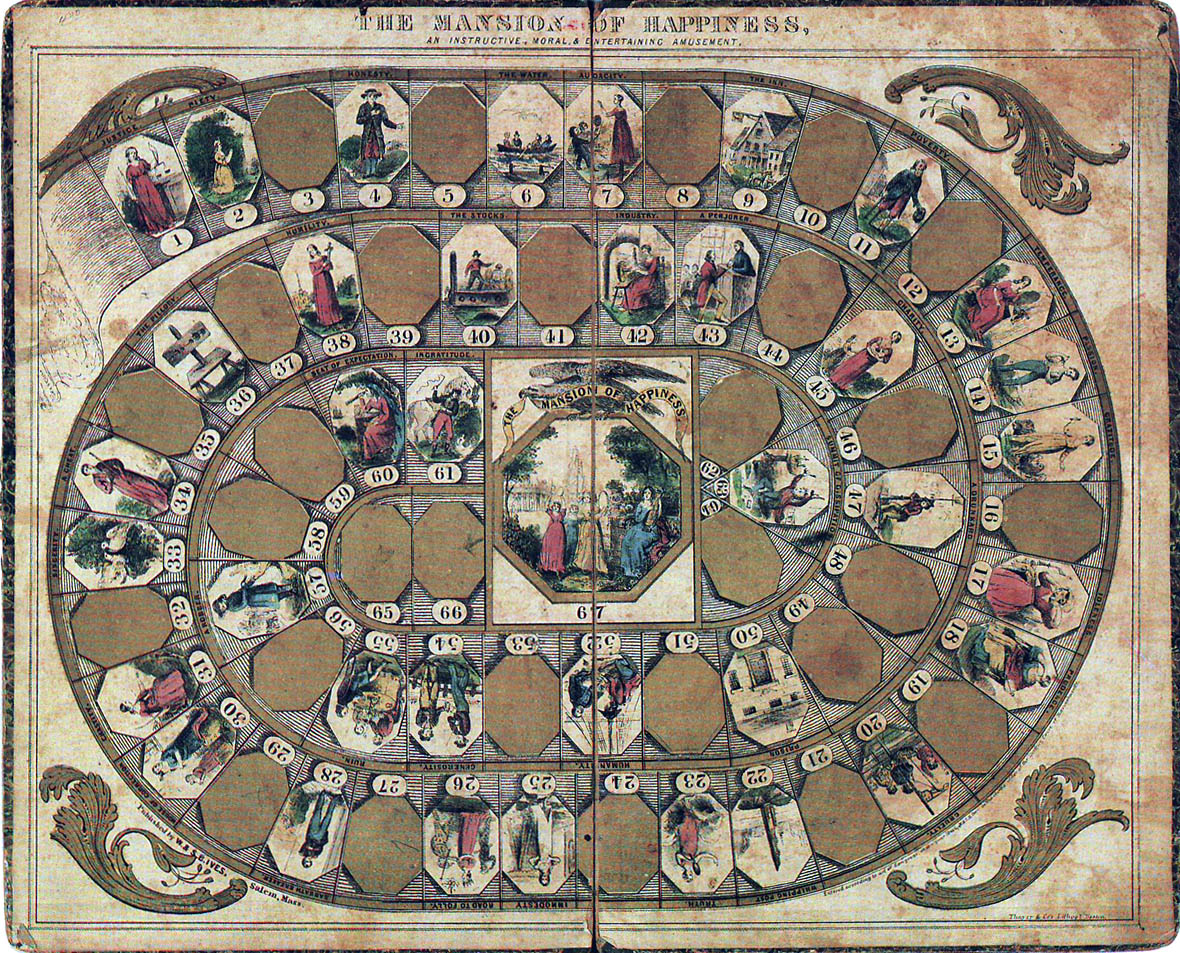
The sixty-seven space spiral track of The Mansion of Happiness (1843) depicts various Christian virtues and vices

The first two print runs used Thayer and Company lithographers, with one litho stone for the color and the other for printing black on the white paper stock. Because the paper of the 1840s through the 1890s included a lavish amount of fiber, often taken from mummy wrappings, it would not fade or decompose like the wood pulp paper used today. The first print run copied the Laurie and Whittles game. Laurie and Whittles used gold ink. Thayer mixed his ink to look gold but it really was a goldish brown. Like Laurie and Whittles game, Thayer used an octagonal end space.

SECOND EDITION: In Thayer's second print run, in 1844, he used the same litho stones as used in the first edition. Green was used instead of goldish brown and the endspace remained an octagon. By September 24, 1844, between 3000 and 4000 of the Thayer printed games were sold by its publishers, W. &. S.B. Ives.

THIRD EDITION: By the fall of 1844, Thayer left the lithography business and was replaced by John Bufford, a lithographer who worked for Thayer in Boston from 1939 through 1844. Previously, from 1835 through 1839, Bufford owned his own firm in New York under the title Bufford Lithographer. By the end of 1844 through 1851, the Boston company name was changed to J. H. Bufford & Co. The next, third edition, listed Bufford Lithographer so the third edition must have been printed after the beginning of the fall of 1844 but before the end of 1844. J. H. Bufford & Co. printed other Ives' games but this third edition of Ives' The Mansion Of Happiness is the only Ives' game to list Bufford Lithographer. Green was again used on one of the litho stones but the end space was a green circle. The other litho stone printed black.

FOURTH EDITION: Thayer then returned to his business in 1847. Ives needed another print run of The Mansion Of Happiness that year. So Thayer needed two new litho stones, resulting in the fourth edition. Thayer again printed one color in black and one color in green and changed the endspace back to a green octagon. The entire game board looked different from his first two print runs. Thayer's first and second edition litho stones were either no longer usable or ground down and redrawn for other lithographs. On the new "black printing" litho stone the position of "Thayer and Company Lithographers" was moved. The new "green printing" litho stone not only included green printing for unnamed spaces but also for corner decorations and to highlight the beginning of the banner.

FIFTH EDITION: Another Thayer edition was needed between 1847 and 1853, so splitting the difference results in 1850. We know this because the lithography is different from the 1847 edition. The "green printing" litho stone had apparently been damaged or over used so the green printing at the beginning of the banner was removed.

SIXTH EDITION: Yet another Thayer printrun was needed in early 1853. Thayer was about to leave his Boston business for the final time, but finished the job for the Ives firm. This sixth edition resulted from another need to redraw the green printing litho stone. Green was removed from the banner and corners, and, only the blank spaces were printed in green.

SEVENTH EDITION: When Thayer left, his brother-in-law, S. W. Chandler took over the business in late 1853. so a seventh edition was needed by the beginning of 1854. Two new litho stones were made. Chandler printed black using one stone and green with the other. The endspace was changed back to a green circle. There are at least two known copies of the Chandler edition, one was owned by deceased game historian Lee Dennis. Another is owned by a charter member of The American Game Collectors Association.

EIGHTH EDITION: William and Stephen Bradshaw Ives dissolved their partnership on April 24, 1854. William then put most of his time managing his newspaper, The Salem Observer. Stephen Bradshaw held the copyrights for the games and started a fancy goods importing business in Boston while overseeing the Salem business owned by a partnership of his youngest son, Henry P. Ives, and Henry's partner, Augustus Smith at the same business location. A new Mansion Of Happiness print run was needed but Chandler was no longer in business, With control of the copyright, the Ives family chose lithographer F.F. Oakleys. Consequently, Ives and Smith could sell The Mansion Of Happiness in Salem but had no right to the copyright. F. F. Oakleys needed to two new litho stones so the eighth edition was created. One stone was used to print black and the other to print green. The circle endspace was retained. In addition to continue publishing The Mansion of Happiness, H. P. Ives and A. A. Weeks published at least two new games: Experts and Tournament & Knighthood.

NINTH EDITION: By December 21, 1860, Henry P. Ives bought out A. A. Smith to obtain the business. A. A. Smith then partnered with G. M. Whipple to form another bookstore and publishing business where they published The Game of Authors. Henry P. Ives continued to publish The Mansion of Happiness using other lithographers, including Taylor & Adams of Boston in 1864, Henry P. Ives was free to publish The Mansion Of Happiness and other Ives' games under his name, his brother's name, and his father's name.

TENTH EDITION: In 1886, Henry P. Ives sold his remaining inventory to George S. Parker. George S. Parker reprinted the green cover label to read H. P. Ives, Geo. S. Parker & Co. and affixed this label to the back of the gameboard over the original H. P. Ives label. By 1888, Henry P. Ives sold all the game rights of the Ives family to Geo. S. Parker & Co., part of them in 1887 and the rest of them in 1888. The green printing and circle end space remained through different lithographers until 1886.

ELEVENTH EDITION:

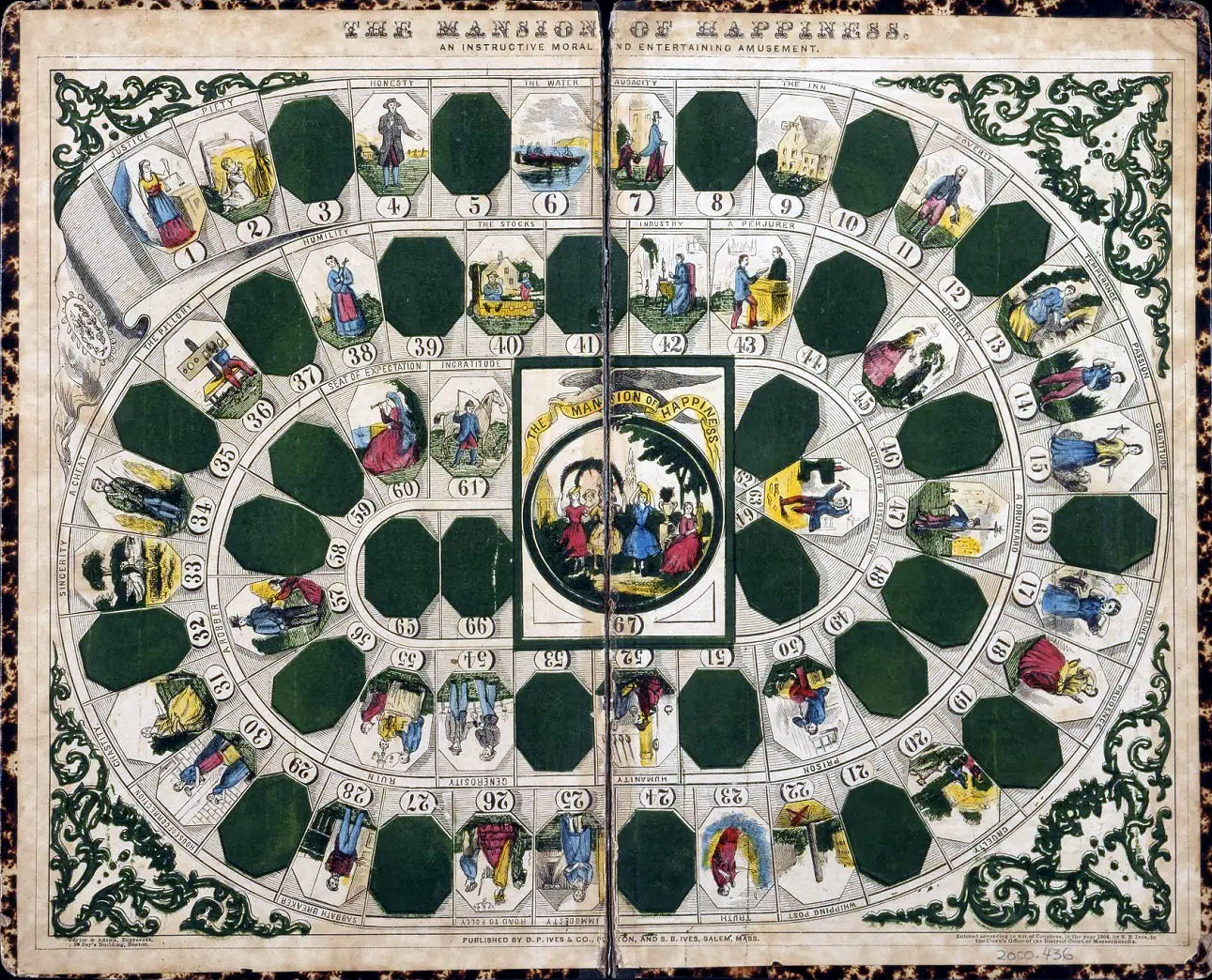
Game board published by Parker Brothers in 1894

Parker Brothers published the eleventh edition in 1894. They continued to print this 1894 edition well into the early 1900s.

TWELFTH EDITION: McLoughlin Brothers of New York published their own edition in 1895, using different lithographs from the 1894 Parker Brothers edition, both on the game box cover and game board.

THIRTEENTH EDITION: In 1926, Parker Brothers Inc. republished The Mansion of Happiness in its original form, with minor modification to game spaces. The game included the circular end space introduced by J. Bufford in the third edition. This sixth edition used a folding game board with a fabric and cardboard pocket on the back edge of the game board. The teetotum was made using a wood dowel and cardboard hexagon.

== Misconceptions ==
Anne Wales Abbot was believed to be the designer of the Ives' game, The Mansion of Happiness for over 145 years, from 1843 to 1989. She, however, did not design The Mansion of Happiness but did design two other Ives' games: Dr. Busby and Master Rodbury and His Pupils.

Anne Wales Abbot also designed The Game Of Racers for Crosby and Nichols of Boston, an Ives's competitor. According to The Salem Observer, The Game Of Racers went on sale in Salem, Massachusetts through J. P. Jewett on January 13, 1844. It went on sale in Boston even earlier. It seems that Abbot would have been working with Crosby and Nichols in Boston while the Ives firm published The Mansion Of Happiness.

The Mansion of Happiness was considered the first mass-produced board game in the United States for almost 100 years. In 1886, George S. Parker purchased some of Ives' inventory from Henry P. Ives, who had taken over the Ives' business. George had his own oversized green label printed and proceeded to glue it over the Ives label.

When the last of the Ives brothers died in 1888, board game titans Charles and George Parker purchased the rights to The Mansion of Happiness. In 1894, Parker Brothers republished The Mansion of Happiness in their new patented box. The game came with a cover on top of a box. The game board was attached to the top of the box and a drawer was added to the box for the implements and spinner. A teetotum was no longer needed as a metal pointer could be attached to a lithographed card using a pop rivet. The pointer could then spin around to produce a random number. The game board and box top were printed using lithography, making the game look like a work of art. Some of the vice spaces were removed (those depicting women engaged in immoral acts and behaviors), and men were substituted for women in the House of Correction. The game remained in the Parker Brothers catalog for thirty years, displaying the line, "The first board game ever published in America" on its box cover.

In 1895, the New York game firm of McLoughlin Brothers printed and published another version of The Mansion of Happiness. The McLoughlin version used even better artwork than the Parker Brothers version which makes it more valuable to collectors. The McLoughlin version used a game box with the game board attached to the inside bottom of the box. Implements and spinner were simply placed in the box.

The distinction of "the first published American board game" however is awarded today to The Travellers' Tour Through the United States published by New York book sellers F. & R. Lockwood in 1822. Because printing of game boards was more difficult in 1822 than 1843, the term mass market is a gray area. In 1822 reversed etched copper plates were used to print game boards. After the first 2,000 impressions, breaks quickly appeared in lines. Games were so expensive, the people who could afford them did not want game boards they could not read. By 1843, lithography with water color painting was popular. Lithography could easily produce 40,000 perfect impressions.

== Legacy ==
With The Mansion Of Happiness published from 1800 in England to 1926 in the United States, it is the longest continuously published board game with a known designer, George Fox. That totals 126 years of continuous publication. The board games Chess, Draughts (Checkers), Go, and many other board games have been continuously published for a longer time, but the designer of these games is unknown.
