= The Game of Life: Twists & Turns =

2007 board game

- Publishers: Milton Bradley Company
- Players: 2 to 4
- Setup time: 10 minutes (approx.)
- Playing time: Variable, 60 minutes approx. for 15 years and 4 players
- Chance: High (spinning a wheel, card-drawing, luck)
- Age range: 9+ (12+ in Australia)
- Skills: Counting

The Game of Life: Twists & Turns is a 2007 version of the classic board game The Game of Life. Players try to earn the most life points in this game by going through various paths. A major change in this game from the original is that players use an electronic Lifepod instead of money to play the game.

== Rules ==
=== Setup/starting ===
A Visa game card

A Life scorecard

To set up the game, players each get a Visa game card, a matching coloured scorecard, a skateboard and car upgrades. All players also get some arrow clips and a Lifepod reference card. The career cards are divided among the players, and one is chosen. Players then put an arrow clip on the lowest step of their career ($5,000). The Life cards are then shuffled, and players put their skateboards on any of the start spaces—Earn It!, Learn It!, Live It! or Love it!.

=== Years for playing ===
Players must enter the number of "years" they want to play into the Lifepod when they start the game. This can be any number from 1 to 99 and can be shortened/lengthened if desired. It is recommended that players play at least 10 years on their very first time playing.

A 4-player game will take approximately 40 minutes for 10 years, 1 hour for 15 years and 2 hours for 30 years. A game with fewer players will take less time.

=== Gameplay ===
On a player's turn, they press SPIN on the Lifepod. It will automatically give the other player salary for their job. A red light will travel around the numbers before finally stopping on a number. This is the number of spaces a player moves. If a player wants to, they can move directly to any Start space instead of moving. This ends their turn.

The player must then resolve the space they landed/stopped/passed on (see Game Spaces below).

=== Contents ===
The game includes the following:

- Electronic Lifepod – The Lifepod is where players enter the amounts and keep track of all their assets in the game.
- Visa game cards – Inserted into Lifepod at start of turn, taken out at the end. Comes in 4 colours (red, blue, green, yellow).
- Gameboard – Divided into 4 parts
- Scorecards – Used for tracking marriage, babies, salaries, degrees and houses.
- Career cards – All career cards have 7 careers (see Careers below).
- Lifepod reference cards – Used to help players press the right buttons on the Lifepod.
- Arrow clips-Attached to scorecards.
- Skateboards and car upgrades – Used to represent the player's vehicle used to travel around the board with. Each has its own bonus.
- Life cards – Have events on them that tell players to add/take away money and Life Points. They are decided by what section of the board the player is on.
- Quick rules card/instructions – The quick rules card helps players get into the game faster while the instructions give players more details on what to do in the game.

=== Game spaces ===
The game spaces and what to do if a player lands on them:

- Blank and start spaces – The player draws a Life Card.
- Car/house spaces – The player may choose to buy/sell a car/house. The player draws a Life Card if he/she does not want to buy/sell a car/house.
- Lottery – Play lottery (the player who landed on Lottery picks 3 numbers, other players pick 1. The player whose number comes up wins the Lottery amount). The player draws Life card if he/she does not want to play.

Earn It! spaces

- +1 promotion – The player moves his/her arrow clip one step up their career ladder (they must meet requirements). If their career has a ? – chance, they press Chance on the Lifepod. 1 or 2 gets the promotion, while a 0 leaves the salary where it is.
- +2 promotions – Similar to +1 promotion, but the player moves arrow clip two steps up career ladder (they must meet requirements). If their career has ? – chance, the player has two chances to spin a 1 or 2 and get the two promotions.
- Business venture – The player takes away $10,000 to $100,000 from their account, and presses Chance. A 1 or 2 adds twice the amount taken away, while a 0 loses the investment. The player draw Life card if he/she does not want to invest.

Learn It! spaces

- Pay space – The player pays the amount indicated on the space.
- Earn degree – The player adds 2,000 Life Points and adds an arrow clip to the degree on the scorecard.
- May choose a new career – If a player wants to, they may pick another Career card to replace theirs. They will start on the same space (as long as requirements are met).
- Earn Ph.D – A player stops on this space, adds 3,000 Life Points, gets a promotion and adds an arrow clip to the PH.D on the scorecard.

Live It! spaces

- Pay travel expenses – The player stops and pays $20,000.
- + Life points – The player adds the life points indicated.
- Auction – The player may choose to take away $10,000 to $100,000 from their account, and press Chance. A 1 or 2 adds twice the amount taken away, while a 0 loses the auction. A player draws a Life Card if he/she does not want to bid in auction.

Love It! spaces

- Get married – The player stops, presses Marriage (3) on the Lifepod and presses Enter. All other players automatically give the married player $1,000. That player now gets 3,000 Life Points now and 1,500 every turn from then on. If the player is already married, follow the same instructions. That player will get extra Life Points
- Try for a baby – The player stops, and presses Chance. A 0 means no babies, 1 means a baby and two means twins. The player is given 350 Life Points for each baby, but subtracts 10%–40% from the player's salary.
- Baby boy or Baby girl – The player adds a baby. For twins the player adds two babies.

=== LIFEPod buttons/functions ===
The LIFEpod is used to keep track of most things in the game.

The buttons and their functions follow. Note that 4 and 9 are not used for anything except when entering money, Life Points and salaries

Button	Function
0-Salary	Enter new salary, do not press $
1-Lottery	Play the lottery. Take all cards out first
2 – chance	Spins 0, 1 or 2
3-Marriage	Get married/celebrate anniversary
5-House	Buy/sell a house
6-Car	Buy/sell a car
7-Baby	Have a baby or twins
8-Volume	Adjust the Lifepod volume
10-Years	Enter number of turns/years the game will take. 10 cannot be used to enter figures
ENTER	Confirm action
SPIN	Press at start of turn to receive salary, pay bills and spin
UNDO	Cancel the last action completed on the Lifepod
LIFE POINTS	Press to enter Life Points
$	Press to enter money
+/-	Press to tell Lifepod to add/subtract money or Life Points

=== Winning the game ===
The game is over when the Lifepod runs out of years. Each player puts their Visa Card into the Lifepod, which will calculate the number of Life Points the player has won. This is done by changing the values of their cars and houses into Life Points. The player with the most Life Points wins the game.

== Differences ==
Feature	Original Game of Life	Twists and Turns Edition
Board	Follows path	Divided into 4 sections (Earn it, Live it, Love it, Learn it)
Way of calculating values/assets	Money	LIFEPod
Salary	Salary is the same each Pay Day (unless traded or changed)	Higher salary earned by promotions (unless career is changed)

=== US version vs European versions ===
The game has been published in multiple European countries (including UK) and languages. There are, however, some differences in the game board and rules, which are equal among all European editions but different from US edition. Examples:

- Game board: The colors of "Love it" and "Earn it" sections are swapped in the European game boards. The spaces which trigger on passing them (e.g., promotion spaces) are green (instead of pink) in European editions.
- In European games, all promotions automatically succeed; no need to roll for Chance on higher levels. US version requires a Chance roll of 1 or 2 to succeed on higher level promotions.
- Career cards and salaries are different, e.g. there is a Corporate career in the US edition only, while the Dancer career only exists in the European editions. Maximum salary in European editions is 1,600,000 (Head of Scotland Yard; Detective career on highest level, Ph.D. required).
- Currency is $ in US edition, and € in European editions except for the UK edition, which uses pounds. This difference is only cosmetic and does not have impact on gameplay.
- The Lifepod works the same way in both US and European games; only the labels next to the buttons are printed in the corresponding language.
- In European games, the Degree and Ph.D. spaces award higher amounts of Life Points, and will not charge money. The Ph.D. space also requires no stop in European games.
- Some event cards and game board spaces are changed in European games.

== Careers ==
There are 24 career cards in The Game of Life: Twists and Turns (12 double-sided cards). The available careers and their salaries are:

Career card	Starting career/salary	2nd career/salary	3rd career/salary	4th career/salary	5th career/salary	6th career/salary	Highest career/salary
Acting	Movie extra ($5,000)	Understudy ($18,000)	Stage actor ($35,000)	TV actor ($80,000)	Movie actor ($500,000 – chance)	Movie director ($1,000,000 – chance)	Movie producer ($2,000,000 – chance)
Animation art/comics	Comic book store clerk ($5,000)	Art store salesperson ($18,000)	Cartoonist ($40,000)	Comic book artist ($85,000)	3D animator ($250,000 – degree)	Special effects artist ($600,000 – degree)	Animation studio head ($1,300,000 – chance)
Art & design	Design intern ($5,000)	Production artist ($21,000)	Graphic designer ($45,000 – degree)	Interior designer ($110,000 – degree)	Automotive designer ($350,000 – degree)	Fashion designer ($550,000 – degree)	Design consultant ($900,000 – chance)
Aviation	Baggage handler ($5,000)	Flight attendant ($22,000)	Air traffic controller ($45,000)	Navigator ($90,000 – degree)	Helicopter pilot ($250,000 – degree)	Commercial airline pilot ($500,000 – Ph.D)	Airline Executive ($1,200,000 – chance)
Beauty	Nail care artist ($5,000)	Hairstylist ($20,000)	Cosmetologist ($45,000)	Salon owner ($90,000)	Model ($300,000 – chance)	International model ($500,000 – chance)	Supermodel ($2,000,000 – chance)
Broadcasting	TV production assistant ($5,000)	Photojournalist ($20,000)	TV camera operator ($40,000)	Radio deejay ($80,000 – degree)	National TV director ($350,000 – degree)	Television producer ($650,000 – degree)	National news anchor ($2,000,000 – chance)
Building	Apprentice ($5,000)	Construction worker ($22,000)	Foreman ($45,000)	Landscaper ($90,000)	General contractor ($250,000)	Project manager ($600,000 – degree)	World-renown architect ($1,500,000 – chance)
Computer/Internet	Web designer ($5,000)	Web developer ($20,000)	Computer repair specialist ($40,000)	Website host ($80,000)	Video game designer ($300,000 – degree)	Internet guru ($600,000 – degree)	Video game producer ($2,000,000 – chance)
Corporate	Mailroom clerk ($5,000)	Administrative assistant ($18,000)	Manager ($50,000 – degree)	Director ($100,000 – degree)	Vice president ($300,000 – degree)	Senior vice president ($500,000 – Ph.D.)	CEO ($1,000,000 – chance)
Criminal justice	Morgue attendant ($5,000)	Police officer ($25,000)	Homeland security agent ($50,000 – degree)	Forensic specialist ($120,000 – degree)	Prosecutor ($250,000 – Ph.D.)	Attorney general ($500,000 – Ph.D.)	Supreme court justice ($1,200,000 – chance)
Design	Model maker intern ($5,000)	Junior product designer ($22,000)	Senior product designer ($50,000 – degree)	Principal product designer ($90,000 – degree)	Product design manager ($250,000 – degree)	Design consultant ($500,000 – degree)	Inventor ($1,000,000 – chance)
Education	Teaching assistant ($5,000)	Substitute teacher ($20,000)	Teacher ($40,000 – degree)	Vice-principal ($90,000 – degree)	Principal ($250,000 – Ph.D.)	Superintendent ($600,000 – Ph.D.)	College professor ($1,000,000 – chance)
Environment/agriculture	Farming field hand ($5,000)	Environmental police officer ($25,000)	Park ranger ($45,000)	Farmer ($100,000)	Cattle rancher ($250,000)	EPA scientist ($500,000 – degree)	Thoroughbred racehorse breeder ($1,200,000 – chance)
Health	Candy striper ($5,000)	Occupational therapist ($25,000)	Nurse ($60,000 – degree)	General practitioner ($120,000 – Ph.D.)	Pediatrician ($300,000 – Ph.D.)	Surgeon ($500,000 – Ph.D.)	Neurosurgeon ($1,000,000 – chance)
Hospitality	Busboy ($5,000)	Waitress ($20,000)	Hostess ($45,000)	Line cook ($85,000)	Restaurant manager ($250,000)	Executive chef ($500,000 – degree)	TV cooking show personality ($1,200,000 – chance)
Journalism	Newspaper intern ($5,000)	Ad/obituary writer ($21,000)	Reporter ($55,000 – degree)	Feature writer ($90,000 – degree)	Managing editor ($200,000 – degree)	Newspaper magnate ($600,000 – degree)	Non-fiction best-selling author ($1,500,000 – chance)
Military	Private ($5,000)	Sergeant ($21,000)	Lieutenant ($50,000)	Captain ($100,000 – degree)	Major ($250,000 – degree)	Colonel ($400,000 – degree)	Chief general ($1,000,000 – chance)
Miscellaneous	Strawberry picker ($5,000)	Homemaker ($18,000)	Nanny ($40,000)	Clown ($80,000)	Wedding/event planner ($300,000)	International translator ($500,000)	Television minister ($2,000,000 – chance)
Retail/fashion	Salesclerk ($5,000)	Personal shopper ($21,000)	Sales manager ($40,000)	Fashion store buyer ($80,000)	Fashion magazine critic ($250,000)	Fashion designer ($400,000 – degree)	Fashion design superstar ($1,500,000 – chance)
Music	Music store clerk ($5,000)	Voice & music teacher ($20,000)	Wedding singer ($30,000)	Indy rock band member ($60,000)	Rock band w/#1 record ($300,000 – chance)	Solo artist ($600,000 – chance)	Superstar ($1,500,000 – chance)
Science/exploration	Lab assistant ($5,000)	Artifact researcher ($20,000)	Safari guide ($40,000)	Archeology teacher assistant (75,000 – degree)	Archeology professor ($320,000 – degree)	Archeologist ($550,000 – degree)	International treasure hunter ($2,000,000 – chance)
Small business	Car wash attendant ($5,000)	Convenience store clerk ($19,000)	Online auctioneer ($50,000)	Pizza restaurant owner ($110,000)	Real estate agent ($250,000)	Investment broker ($500,000 – degree)	Fine art gallery owner ($1,000,000 – chance)
Sports	Amateur athlete ($5,000)	High school coach ($22,000)	Pro benchwarmer ($40,000)	Pro starting athlete ($120,000 – chance)	Coach ($350,000)	General manager ($600,000)	Sports superstar ($2,000,000 – chance)
Writer/media	Proofreader ($5,000)	Copywriter ($25,000)	Magazine editor ($45,000 – degree)	Creative director ($120,000 – degree)	TV writer ($350,000 – degree)	Screenwriter ($550,000 – degree)	Successful novelist ($1,000,000 – chance)
