= The Man from U.N.C.L.E. gun =

Fictional firearm

The Man from U.N.C.L.E. gun, often referred to as the U.N.C.L.E. Special, is a fictional firearm depicted on the popular TV show The Man from U.N.C.L.E. which ran from September 1964 until it was canceled mid-season in 1968. Onscreen it was a semi-automatic pistol that could be converted to a carbine-sniper rifle that could fire fully automatic.

== History ==
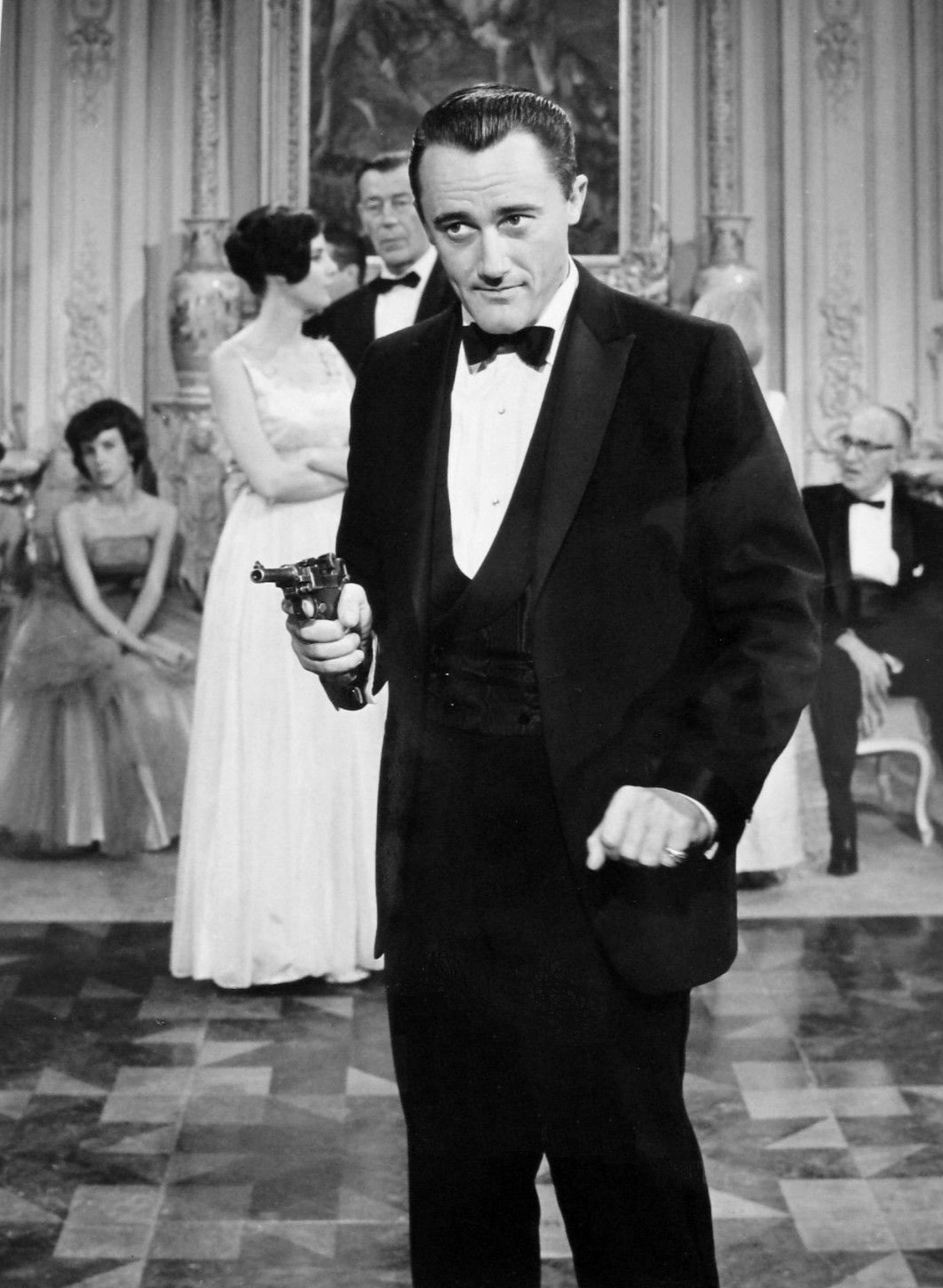
Robert Vaughn with his P-08 in "The Vulcan Affair"

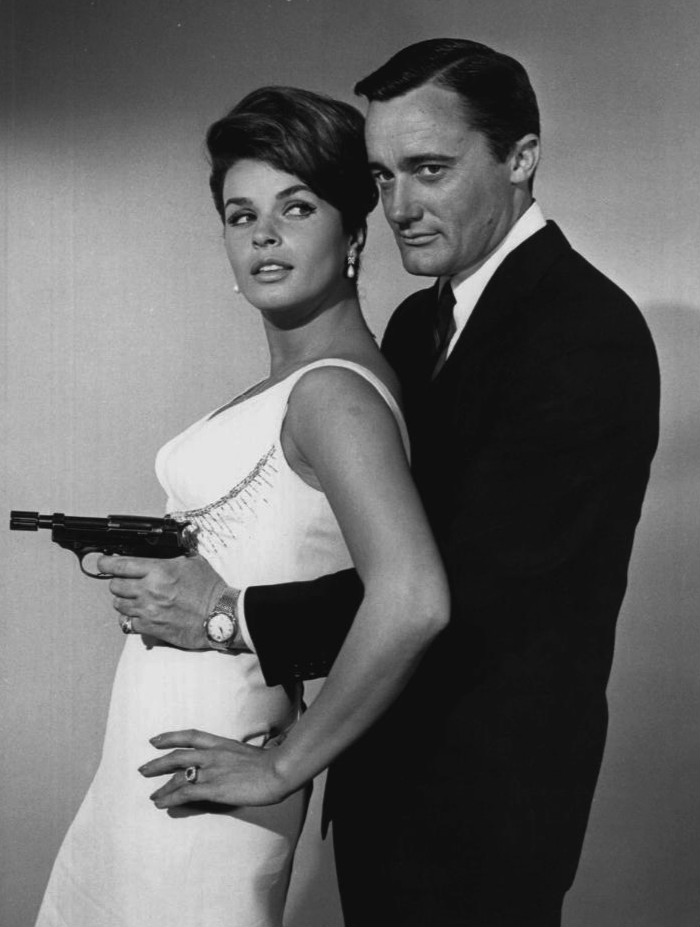
Robert Vaughn with his modified P-38 (1964)

Sam Rolfe, the designer of the gun, said:

I wanted one gun capable of shooting single shots or rapid-fire automatic shots, with sound or silently. I also wanted sleep inducing darts, explosive bullets and just bullets, and a gun that could convert to a long-range rifle. I wanted everything in the U.N.C.L.E. gun, and the one thing I had forgot, I had put in the Thrush gun—an infra-red light, so the Thrush people could shoot at night.

Stanley Weston, who had handled the toy licensing rights for Dr. Kildare, another MGM Television series produced by Norman Felton, was engaged to do the same for the show retitled The Man from U.N.C.L.E. After viewing the Solo pilot in February, 1964, Weston wrote a letter to Felton expressing excitement over the show's merchandising potential. Weston made a list of 35 suggestions for emblem designs and spy gadgets that could be exploited for marketing purposes. Among them was the proposal for a distinctive pistol that should feature a silencer. "Also, from our viewpoint," Weston added, "it would be great if Solo uses a machine gun from time to time."

The U.N.C.L.E. Special was originally based on a 1934 7.65mm German Mauser pistol. While early episodes were being shot, the Mauser jammed frequently, and visually all the accessories added to convert the pistol to a carbine seemed to overwhelm the small pistol. It was soon replaced by the Walther P38 9mm Parabellum that the producers borrowed from the Combat! television series, which was also shot on the MGM backlot.

The property masters of the series created six U.N.C.L.E. Specials at a cost of approximately $1,500 per gun, but only two had the full array of attachments.
