= The Game of Life =

Board game created in 1960

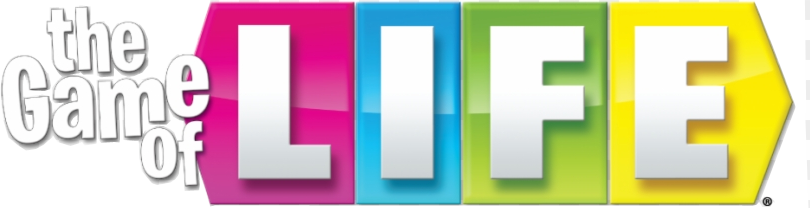

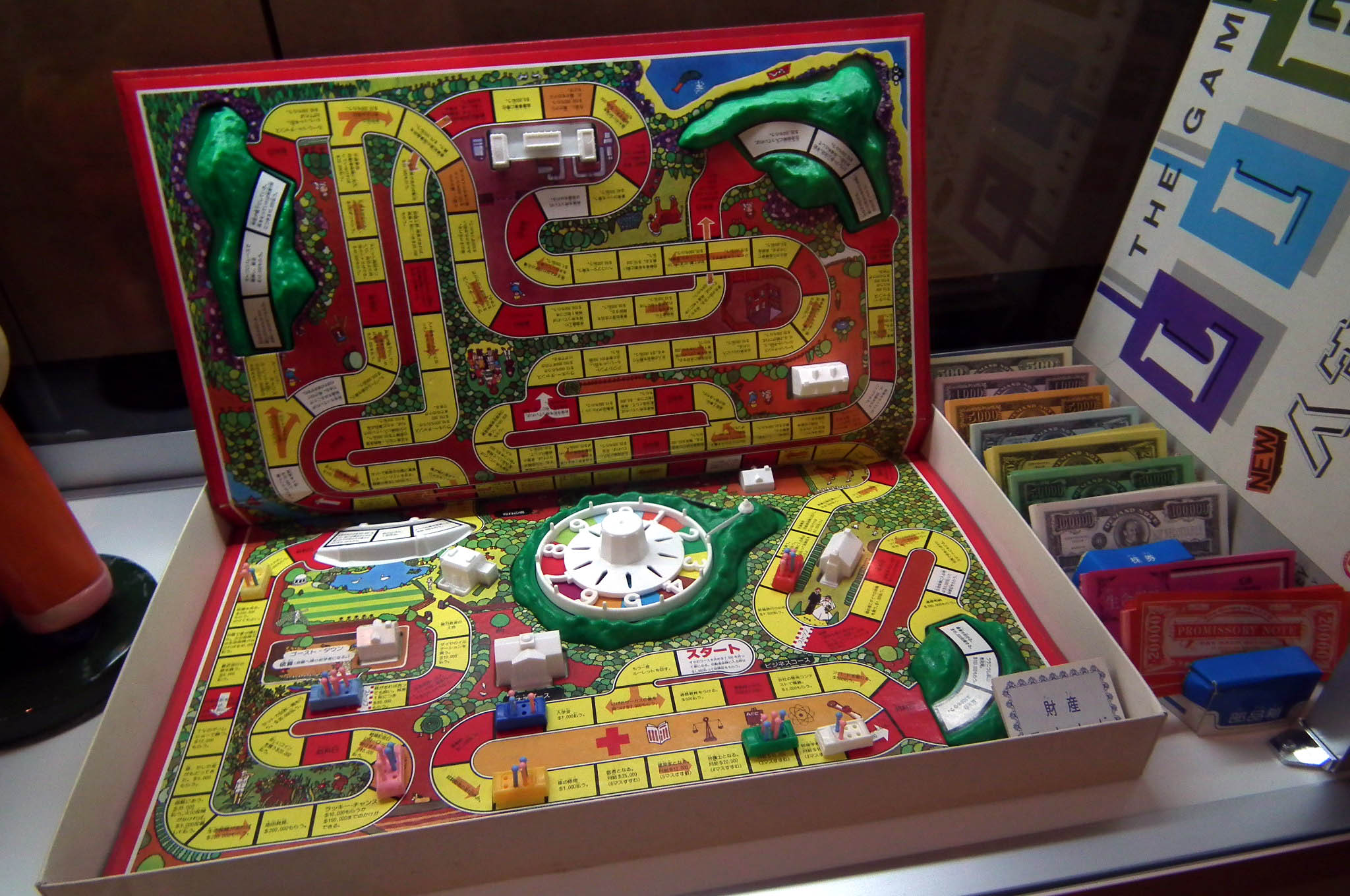
- Japanese-language version of the modern edition of The Game of Life
- Designers: Bill Markham, Reuben Klamer
- Publishers: Milton Bradley (Classic): Winning Moves Games USA; Hasbro (Modern)
- Publication: 1860; 166 years ago (Original); 1960; 66 years ago (Modern)
- Genres: Board game
- Players: 2 to 4 or 6
- Setup time: 5 minutes (approx.)
- Playing time: 45 minutes (approx.)
- Chance: High (spinning a wheel, card-drawing, luck)
- Age range: 8+
- Skills: Counting, reading

The Game of Life, also known simply as Life, is a board game originally created in 1860 by Milton Bradley as The Checkered Game of Life, the first ever board game for his own company, the Milton Bradley Company. The game simulates a person's travels through their life, from early adulthood to retirement, with college if chosen, jobs, marriage, and possible children along the way. Up to six players, depending on the version, can participate in a single game. (Note: Some printings of The Game of Life are marked as two to six players; others are marked as two to four players.) Variations of the game accommodate up to ten players.

The modern version was originally published 100 years later, in 1960. It was created and co-designed by Bill Markham and Reuben Klamer, respectively, and was "heartily endorsed" by Art Linkletter. It is now part of the permanent collection of the Smithsonian's National Museum of American History and an inductee into the National Toy Hall of Fame.

== History ==
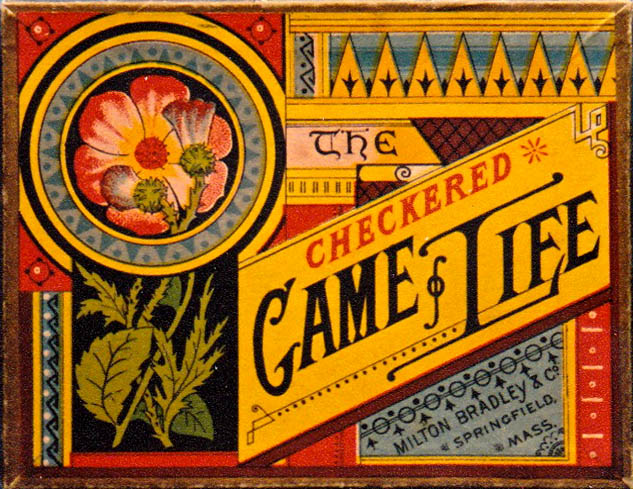
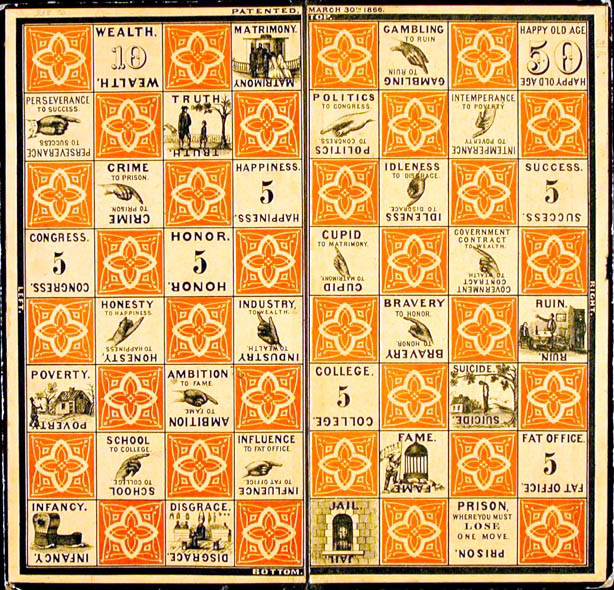
Cover and board of Milton Bradley's The Checkered Game of Life

The game was originally created in 1860 by Milton Bradley as The Checkered Game of Life, and was the first game created by Bradley, a successful lithographer. The game sold 45,000 copies by the end of its first year. Like many 19th-century games, such as The Mansion of Happiness by S. B. Ives in 1843, it had a strong moral message.

The game board resembled a modified checkerboard. The object was to land on "good" spaces and collect 100 points, however if only one player was left alive, they would be automatically crowned the winner. As in snakes and ladders, some spaces caused the player to move up or down to a different space. A player could gain 50 points by reaching "Happy Old Age" in the upper-right corner, opposite "Infancy" where one began, and if they landed on the "Suicide" space, 6 right and 2 up from "Infancy", they would be out of the game. Instead of dice – which were associated with gambling – players used a six-sided top called a teetotum.

=== Modern game ===
In 1960 the Game of Life was introduced. A collaboration between Reuben Klamer and Bill Markham, it consists of a track which passes along, over, and through small mountains, buildings, and other features. A player travels along the track in a small plastic automobile, according to the spins of a small wheel on the board with spaces numbered one through ten. Each car has six holes into which pegs are added as the player "gets married" and "acquires children". The modern game pegs are pink and blue to distinguish the sexes (blue for male, pink for female). Each player starts the game with one peg.

There is also a bank which includes money in $5,000, $10,000, $20,000, $50,000, and $100,000 bills; automobile, life, fire, and/or homeowners' insurance policies (depending on the version); $20,000 promissory notes and stock certificates. Other tangibles vary between versions of the game. $500 bills were dropped in the 1980s, as were $1,000 bills in 1992. The rules in all different modern versions of the game are generally the same, even though they may have different cards and spaces. The winner is the player who retires with the most money.

Hasbro acquired Milton Bradley Company in 1984 and continued developing the game. Markham's heirs sued Hasbro in 2015, claiming that he did not get proper credit or reward for developing it. In 2019, Judge William E. Smith ruled in favor of Hasbro, explaining that while developing a game is a collaborative effort, copyright law assigns the copyright only to one entity.

== Versions ==
=== 1960s version ===
The Game of Life, copyrighted by the Milton Bradley Company in 1960, had some differences from later versions. For example, once a player reached the "Day of Reckoning" space, they had to choose one of two options. The first was to continue along the road to "Millionaire Acres," if the player believed they had enough money to out-score all opponents. The second option was to try to become a "Millionaire Tycoon" by betting everything on one number and spinning the wheel. The player immediately won the game if the chosen number came up, or went to the "Poor Farm" and was eliminated if it did not. If no player became a Millionaire Tycoon, the one with the highest final total won the game. In addition, there were spaces that forced a player to go back; in the case a player landed on one of these, they were forced to take the shortest route and pay no attention to any penalties and rewards in doing so.

This version had Art Linkletter as the spokesman, included his likeness on the $100,000 bills (with his name displayed on the bills as "Arthur Linkletter Esq.") and a rousing endorsement from Linkletter on the cover of the box. It was advertised as a "Milton Bradley 100th Anniversary Game" and as "A Full 3-D Action Game."

As of 2022, Winning Moves markets a classic 1960s edition.

=== 1970s/1980s versions ===
About halfway through the production of this version, many dollar values doubled. This description focuses on the later version with the larger dollar amounts. Early 1960s-era convertibles were still used in the 1978 edition, while the late 1980s version replaced the convertibles with minivans. The "Poor Farm" was renamed "Bankrupt!" in which losing players would "Retire to the country and become a philosopher", and "Millionaire Acres" was shortened to "Millionaire!" in which the winner can "Retire in style". Like the 1960s version, there were spaces that forced a player to go back; in the case a player landed on one of these, they were forced to take the shortest route and pay no attention to any penalties and rewards in doing so.

The gold "Revenge" squares added a byline, "Sue for damages", in the 1978 edition.

=== 1991 version ===
Exactly seven years after Hasbro acquired the Milton Bradley Company, The Game of Life was updated in 1991 to reward players for good behavior, such as recycling trash and helping the homeless, by awarding players "Life Tiles", each of which was worth a certain amount. At the end of the game, players added up the amounts on the tiles to their cash total, and counted towards the final total. The spaces that forced players to go back were removed, starting with this version.

==== 1998 PC/PlayStation adaptation ====
The 1998 PC and Sony PlayStation video game adaptations of The Game of Life by Hasbro's own video game production company are based on this version. Players could play either the "classic" version using the Life Tiles, or the "enhanced" version, where landing on a space with a Life Tile allows players to play one of several mini-games. In the enhanced version, landing on a Pay Day space allows the player to claim their salary from any opponent of their choice. When purchasing a house, the player selects their preferred property and spins the wheel to determine its purchase price. In contrast, the classic version requires the player to spin the wheel to determine which house they receive. Should a player get married and/or have children, they collect presents from the other players. And in the enhanced game, the winner is determined by how much cash each player has on hand, as Life tiles are not used. The PC version was later re-released in 2003 by Atari Interactive, under ownership from Infogrames Entertainment SA, as the result of a merger between Hasbro Interactive and the old Atari Interactive.

=== 2005 version ===
An updated version of the game was released in 2005 with a few gameplay changes. The new Game of Life reduced the element of chance, although it is still primarily based on chance and still rewards players for taking risks.

=== 2013 version ===
The 2013 version removed Life Tiles and text on the spaces themselves. Most spaces are now "Action Spaces", where a card is drawn. At the end of the game, these cards are worth $100K each. Additionally, houses are no longer mandatory since to buy a house, players must land on a specific space.

=== 2017 version ===
The 2017 version includes green pegs for adding pets to a player's family. Pets are worth more than children at the end of the game.

=== 2021 version ===
Action cards are not worth $100K at the end of the game. Careers come with a "bonus salary" - a higher payday if players land directly on the Payday space. There are six peg colors, and there are more split paths on the board with certain paths giving advantages and disadvantages.

=== Other versions ===
==== Board games ====
- Hello Kitty Edition (1999, Japan Only)
- The Game of Life in Monstropolis (Monsters, Inc. version) (2001)
- The Game of Life Card Game (2002)
- Fame Edition (or Game of Life Junior/travel version) (2002)
- Star Wars: A Jedi's Path (2002)
- Pirates of the Caribbean (2004)
- The Simpsons Edition (2004)
- Bikini Bottom SpongeBob SquarePants Edition (2005)
- Pokémon Edition (2006, Japan only)
- Pirates of the Caribbean: Dead Man's Chest (2006)
- Twists and Turns Edition (2007)
- The Game of Life Express (2007)
- Indiana Jones Edition (2008, Target exclusive)
- Family Guy Collectors Edition (2008)
- The Wizard of Oz Edition (2009)
- The Game of Life The Haunted Mansion Theme Park Edition (2009)
- The Game of Life High School Edition (A.K.A. "Pink Edition") (2008)
- LIFE: Rock Star Edition
- The Game of LIFE: It's a Dog's Life Edition (2011)
- The Game of LIFE: The Lorax Edition (2013)
- The Game of LIFE: Despicable Me (2014)
- LIFE: My Little Pony Edition
- Inside Out (2015)
- LIFE: Yo-Kai Watch Edition (2016)
- The Game of Life: The Marvelous Mrs. Maisel Edition (2019)
- The Game of Life: Quarter Life Crisis (2019)
- The Game of Life: Super Mario Edition (2021)
- The Game of LIFE: Jurassic Park Edition (2022)
- The Game of LIFE: Barbie Edition (2025)
- The Game of LIFE: Harry Potter Edition (2026)

==== Video games ====
- RPG Jinsei Game - Nintendo Entertainment System (1993)
- Super Jinsei Game series
  - Super Jinsei Game - Super Famicom (1994)
  - Super Jinsei Game 2 - Super Famicom (1995)
  - Super Jinsei Game 3 - Super Famicom (1996)
- The Game of Life - Windows, PlayStation (1998)
- Special Jinsei Game - GameCube (2003)
- The Game of Life/Yahtzee/Payday - Game Boy Advance (2005)
- The Game of Life - Wii (2008)
- The Game of Life - Windows (2008)
- The Game of Life - WiiWare (2009) (Japan exclusive)
- The Game of Life Classic Edition - iPhone (2009)
- Hasbro Family Game Night 3 for Xbox 360, Wii, and PlayStation 3 video game platforms, and was also later released as part of the Hasbro Family Game Night Fun Pack, which consisted as a compilation of both Hasbro Family Game Night 2 and Hasbro Family Game Night 3.
- The Game of Life: 2016 Edition - iOS, Android and Steam by Marmalade Game Studio (2016)
- The Game of Life 2 - iOS, Android and Steam by Marmalade Game Studio (2020)
- The Game of Life 2 - Nintendo Switch, PlayStation 4, PlayStation 5, Xbox One, and Xbox Series X (2022)

==== Television show ====
- Game Show Edition on The Hub (2011)

== Untitled film ==
In 2026, a film adaptation was announced to be in development at Amazon MGM Studios. The film will be directed by Sean Anders and written by Allan Loeb, while being produced by Chernin Entertainment.

== Reviews ==
- Family Games: The 100 Best
