= Dynowarz: Destruction of Spondylus =

1990 video game

- Developer: Advance Communication Company
- Publisher: Bandai
- Programmer: Yasuhiko "Bamboo" Chikuda
- Artists: Ryuki Kasai, Reiko Haketa
- Composers: Osamu Kasai, Masaaki Harada, Nobuhito Nakayama
- Platform: Nintendo Entertainment System
- Release: NA: April 1990
- Genre: Platformer
- Mode: Single-player

Dynowarz: Destruction of Spondylus is a 1990 platform game developed by Advance Communication Company and published by Bandai for the Nintendo Entertainment System (NES). The plot is set in the artificial Spondylus Solar System, and follows Professor Proteus as he pilots his creation, the Cyborasaurus, to stop a computer virus released by his former partner, Dr. Branius.

The game is known for its dual-gameplay mechanic, which alternates between side-scrolling mecha combat and on-foot platforming stages inside planetary bases. The concept received pre-release attention from Nintendo Power for its ambition, but retrospective reception has been negative, with critics citing poor execution, unbalanced difficulty, and repetitive design.

== Gameplay ==
Dynowarz is a single-player platformer that alternates between two distinct styles of play: "Surface" stages and "Main Computer" stages. During Surface stages, the player pilots the Cyborasaurus, a robotic dinosaur equipped with a shield, jump jets, and a variety of weapons including a Launch Fist, Bombs, Lasers, and Fire Balls. These segments focus on combat against large enemies.

Upon reaching a base, the game transitions to Main Computer stages, where the player controls Professor Proteus on foot. These sections are traditional puzzle-platforming levels where Proteus uses a vaporization gun to navigate corridors and disable the planetary life support systems. The game spans seven worlds within the Spondylus Solar System, culminating in a final confrontation with Dr. Branius.

== Reception ==
Reception

Review scores
Publication	Score
Nintendo Power	3.25/5
Game Informer	Negative

Upon its release, Nintendo Power gave the game a composite score of 13 out of 20 in its "Power Meter" ratings, praising the graphics (3.5/5) and challenge (3.5/5) but giving average marks for play control and "theme/fun".

Retrospective assessment has been generally negative. In a 2008 "Retro Review", Game Informer criticized the game as a "huge pile of [dyno] dung" and conceded that the concept of a character exiting a vehicle to fight on foot was "slightly ahead of its time" but dismissed the game for its poor execution.

1up.com described the gameplay as "unbalanced", specifically contrasting the two modes. The Cyborasaurus sections were described as empowering and easy, and the human segments are criticized as tedious and difficult due to poor hit detection. Hardcore Gaming 101 described the game as "mediocre" and largely forgotten, and said its visual style—resembling the Super Sentai (or Power Rangers) aesthetic—garnered some initial interest.
