= Fuzzical Fighter =

1991 video game

- Developer(s): Make Software
- Publisher(s): Sigma Enterprises
- Director(s): Hiroaki Kawamoto
- Designer(s): Takeo Kakazu; Jun Uchijima
- Composer(s): Sachiko Oita; Akihiro Akamatsu
- Platform(s): Family Computer
- Release: JP: May 17, 1991
- Genre(s): Scrolling shooter
- Mode(s): Single-player

Fuzzical Fighter (ファジカルファイター) is a horizontally scrolling shooter by Sigma Enterprises that was released only in Japan for Family Computer in 1991. It includes role playing game elements.

== Plot ==
Fighting the final boss: a large purple dragon

The Dimensional Stone, which is required to maintain balance in the world of starship pilot Mark was stolen. The king finds a hero to retrieve the stone; using the "Fuzzical Fighter" to transport the player's character into enemy territory.

Towns are visited in-between stages to provide the player with weapons and artifacts that are bought with the in-game gold currency. Players can choose to backtrack to either a previous stage while staying at the inn or to a stage that he has not yet explored. They also have access to three different kinds of healing spells: Riken (minor healing), Rikento (normal healing) and Rikentaru (major healing).

Despite being a mechanical object and not a creature, the Fuzzical Fighter has magic points that can be replenished while in the towns. The Fuzzy Fighter itself resembles a spaceship with a mechanical tail at the end.
