= The Golf '92 =

1992 video game

- Cover art
- Developer(s): G.O.1
- Publisher(s): G.O.1
- Platform(s): Family Computer
- Release: JP: July 3, 1992
- Genre(s): Traditional golf simulation
- Mode(s): Single-player, multiplayer

The Golf '92 (ザ・ゴルフ'92) is a Family Computer video game that involves golfing with popular Japanese golf pros.

== Summary ==
There are three difficulty levels and the game is almost completely in Japanese. There are also three modes: leaderboard (similar to major PGA events), tournament (using a format found in most sports playoffs), and stroke play. Players have a crowd to play their round of golf into front of.

In the hardest difficulty levels, players are confronted with wind levels approaching that of a hurricane while the wind is almost stagnant in the easiest difficulty level. One of the drawbacks of the game is that the player must determine the angle of their flight separately from the strength of their swing and the type of golf club that they will use.
