= List of PlayStation 2 games (A–K) =

This is a list of games for Sony's PlayStation 2 video game console. Title names may be different for each region due to the first language spoken. The last game for the PlayStation 2, Pro Evolution Soccer 2014, was released on 8 November 2013.

== Games list (A–K) ==
There are currently 4344 games across both this page (A to K) and the remaining games from L to Z.

Title	Developer	Publisher	First released	JP	EU^{/ PAL}	NA
.hack//frägment	CyberConnect2	Bandai	2005-11-23^{JP}	Yes		
.hack//G.U.vol.1//Rebirth	CyberConnect2	Bandai	2006-05-18^{JP}	Yes		Yes
.hack//G.U.vol.2//Reminisce	CyberConnect2	Namco Bandai Games	2006-09-28^{JP}	Yes		Yes
.hack//G.U.vol.3//Redemption	CyberConnect2	Namco Bandai Games	2007-01-18 ^{JP}	Yes		Yes
.hack//Infection Part 1	CyberConnect2	Bandai	2002-06-20^{JP}	Yes	Yes	Yes
.hack//Mutation Part 2	CyberConnect2	Bandai	2002-09-19^{JP}	Yes	Yes	Yes
.hack//Outbreak Part 3	CyberConnect2	Bandai	2002-12-12^{JP}	Yes	Yes	Yes
.hack//Quarantine Part 4	CyberConnect2	Bandai	2003-04-10^{JP}	Yes	Yes	Yes
007: Agent Under Fire	EA Redwood Shores	Electronic Arts	2001-11-13^{NA}	Yes ^{KO}	Yes	Yes
007: Everything or Nothing	EA Redwood Shores	Electronic Arts	2004-02-11^{JP}	Yes	Yes	Yes
007: NightFire	Eurocom	Electronic Arts	2002-11-18^{NA}	Yes ^{JP, KO}	Yes	Yes
007: Quantum of Solace •007: Nagusame no Houshuu^{JP}	Eurocom	Activision	2008-10-31^{EU}	Yes	Yes	Yes
10 Pin: Champions Alley	Liquid Games	OG International Ltd	2005-04-05^{PAL}		Yes	
10,000 Bullets •Tsukiyo ni Saraba^{JP, KO}	Blue Moon	Taito^{JP}, CyberFront^{KO}, 505 Game Street^{EU}	2005-02-24^{JP}	Yes ^{JP, KO}	Yes	
120-en no Haru: 120 Yen Stories	Interchannel	Interchannel	2005-02-24^{JP}	Yes		
12Riven: The Psi-Climinal of Integral	CyberFront	CyberFront	2008-03-13^{JP}	Yes		
18 Wheeler American Pro Trucker	Acclaim Studios Cheltenham	Acclaim Entertainment; Sega	2001-11-14^{NA}	Yes	Yes	Yes
187 Ride or Die	Ubisoft	Ubisoft	2005-08-23^{NA}	Yes ^{KO}	Yes	Yes
1945 I & II The Arcade Games •Psikyo Shooting Collection Vol. 1: Strikers 1945 I+II^{JP} •Strikers 1945 I & II^{KO}	Psikyo	Play It!	2004-07-16^{JP}	Yes ^{JP, KO}	Yes	
2002 FIFA World Cup	EA Canada	EA Sports	2002-04-22^{NA}	Yes	Yes	Yes
2003-Toshi Kaimaku – Ganbare Kyuukaiou	Magical Company	Atlus Co.	2003-05-15^{JP}	Yes		
21 Card Games	Mere Mortals	Phoenix Games	2006-07-28^{PAL}		Yes	
24: The Game	SCE Studio Cambridge	2K Games	2006-02-28^{NA}		Yes	Yes
25 to Life	Avalanche Software	Eidos Interactive	2006-01-17^{NA}		Yes	Yes
2nd Super Robot Wars Alpha •Dai-2-Ji Super Robot Taisen Alpha^{JP}	Banpresto	Banpresto	2003-03-27^{JP}	Yes		
3-Nen B-Gumi Kinpachi Sensei Densetsu no Kyoudan ni Tate!	Chunsoft	Chunsoft	2004-06-24^{JP}	Yes		
3LDK – Shiawase ni Narouyo	PrincessSoft	PrincessSoft	2004-07-01^{JP}	Yes		
3rd Super Robot Wars Alpha: To the End of the Galaxy •Dai-3-Ji Super Robot Taisen Alpha Shuuen no Ginga e^{JP}	Banpresto	Banpresto	2005-07-28^{JP}	Yes		
4x4 EVO	Terminal Reality	Gathering of Developers	2001-02-26^{NA}		Yes	Yes
4x4 EVO 2	Terminal Reality	BAM! Entertainment	2002-11-04^{PAL}		Yes	
50 Cent: Bulletproof	Genuine Games	Vivendi Universal Games	2005-11-17^{NA}		Yes	Yes
7 Blades •Seven Blades^{JP}	Konami	Konami	2000-12-21^{JP}	Yes	Yes	
7 Sins	Monte Cristo Multimedia	Digital Jesters	2005-05-20^{PAL}		Yes	
7 Wonders of the Ancient World	MumboJumbo	MumboJumbo	2007-11-20^{NA}		Yes	Yes
_Summer	Hooksoft	GN Software	2006-08-24^{JP}	Yes		
¡Qué pasa Neng! El videojuego	Mere Mortals	Phoenix Games	2006-12-11^{EU}		Yes	
Aa Megami-sama	Marvelous	Marvelous	2007-02-22^{JP}	Yes		
Abarenbō Princess	Alfa System	Kadokawa Games, ESP	2001-11-29^{JP}	Yes		
AC/DC Live: Rock Band Track Pack (Note: stand-alone expansion for Rock Band.)	Harmonix Music Systems	MTV Games	2008-11-02^{NA}		Yes	Yes
A.C.E.: Another Century's Episode	FromSoftware	Banpresto	2005-01-27^{JP}	Yes		
A.C.E.: Another Century's Episode 2 •A.C.E.: Another Century's Episode 2 (Special Vocal Version) (different version)	FromSoftware	Banpresto	2006-03-30^{JP}	Yes		
A.C.E.: Another Century's Episode 3: The Final	FromSoftware	Banpresto	2007-09-06^{JP}	Yes		
Ace Combat 04: Shattered Skies •Ace Combat: Distant Thunder^{PAL}	Namco	Namco	2001-11-01^{NA}	Yes	Yes	Yes
Ace Combat 5: The Unsung War •Ace Combat: Squadron Leader^{PAL}	Namco	Namco	2004-10-25^{NA}	Yes	Yes	Yes
Ace Combat Zero: The Belkan War •Ace Combat: The Balkan War^{PAL}	Namco	Namco	2006-04-25^{NA}	Yes	Yes	Yes
Ace Lightning	Absolute Studios	Gamezlab	2003-03-14^{EU}		Yes	
Aces of War •Reishiki Kanjou Sentouki^{JP}	Marionette	Taito^{JP}, 505 Game Street	2004-03-04^{JP}	Yes	Yes	
Action Girlz Racing	Data Design Interactive	Metro3D	2005-09-15^{EU}		Yes	
Action Man A.T.O.M.: Alpha Teens on Machines	Brain in a Jar	Blast! Entertainment Ltd	2007-05-25^{PAL}		Yes	
Activision Anthology	Contraband Entertainment	Activision	2002-11-19^{NA}		Yes	Yes
Adiboo and the Energy Thieves	Coktel Studio	Vivendi Universal Games	2004-09-24^{PAL}		Yes	
ADK Damashii	SNK Playmore	SNK Playmore	2008-12-18^{JP}	Yes		
Adventure of Tokyo Disney Sea	Konami	Konami	2001-12-20^{JP}	Yes		
The Adventures of Cookie & Cream^{US} •KuriKuri Mix^{JP/EU}	FromSoftware	Agetec Inc.	2000-12-07^{JP}	Yes	Yes	Yes
The Adventures of Darwin •Simple 2000 Series Vol. 99: The Genshijin^{JP} •Darwin^{EU}	Vingt-et-un Systems	D3 Publisher	2006-04-27^{JP}	Yes	Yes	Yes
The Adventures of Jimmy Neutron Boy Genius: Attack of the Twonkies	THQ	THQ	2004-09-13^{NA}		Yes	Yes
The Adventures of Jimmy Neutron Boy Genius: Jet Fusion	THQ	THQ	2003-09-16^{NA}		Yes	Yes
Æon Flux	Terminal Reality	Majesco	2005-11-15^{NA}		Yes	Yes
Aero Elite: Combat Academy •Aero Dancing 4: New Generation^{JP}	Sega-AM2	Sega	2003-03-10^{NA}	Yes		Yes
Aerobics Revolution	Konami	Konami	2003-03-13^{JP}	Yes		
AFL Live 2003	IR Gurus	Acclaim Entertainment	2002-09-05^{AU}		Yes ^{AU}	
AFL Live 2004	IR Gurus	Acclaim Entertainment	2003-11-21^{AU}		Yes ^{AU}	
AFL Live Premiership Edition (Note: update for AFL Live 2004.)	IR Gurus	Acclaim Entertainment	2004-04-29^{AU}		Yes ^{AU}	
AFL Premiership 2005: The Official Game of the AFL Premiership	IR Gurus	SCE Australia^{AU}	2005-09-22^{AU}		Yes ^{AU}	
AFL Premiership 2006	IR Gurus	SCE Australia^{AU}	2006-07-20^{AU}		Yes ^{AU}	
AFL Premiership 2007	IR Gurus	SCE Australia^{AU}	2007-06-28^{AU}		Yes ^{AU}	
After...	Pionesoft	Pionesoft	2004-02-26^{JP}	Yes		
Agassi Tennis Generation	Aqua Pacific	DreamCatcher Interactive	2003-08-25^{NA}		Yes	Yes
Age of Empires II: The Age of Kings	Ensemble Studios	Konami	2001-11-02^{EU}	Yes	Yes	
Agent Hugo	ITE Media	ITE Media	2005-10-12^{PAL}		Yes	
Agent Hugo: Hula Holiday	Attractive Games	NDS Software	2008-10-06^{RU}		Yes	
Agent Hugo: Lemoon Twist	Coyote Console	ITE Media	2007-11-05^{PAL}		Yes	
Agent Hugo: Roborumble	ITE Media	ITE Media	2006-10-06^{PAL}		Yes	
Aggressive Inline	Z-Axis	AKA Acclaim	2002-05-28^{NA}		Yes	Yes
AI Igo 2003	GeneX	GeneX	2003-04-24^{JP}	Yes		
AI Mahjong 2003	GeneX	GeneX	2003-04-24^{JP}	Yes		
AI Shogi 2003	GeneX	GeneX	2003-04-24^{JP}	Yes		
Ai Yori Aoshi	KID	KID	2003-03-20^{JP}	Yes		
Aikagi	NEC Interchannel	NEC Interchannel	2003-09-25^{JP}	Yes		
Air	NEC Interchannel	NEC Interchannel	2002-08-08^{JP}	Yes		
Air Raid 3	Phoenix Games	Phoenix Games	2004^{PAL}		Yes	
Air Ranger 2 Plus: Rescue Helicopter (Note: update for Air Ranger 2: Rescue Helicopter.)	ASK	ASK	2003-10-30^{JP}	Yes		
Air Ranger 2: Rescue Helicopter	ASK	ASK	2002-03-28^{JP}	Yes		
Air Ranger: Rescue Helicopter	ASK	ASK^{JP} Midas Interactive Entertainment^{EU}	2001-03-29^{JP}	Yes	Yes	
AirBlade	Criterion Games	Namco	2001-11-09^{EU}		Yes	Yes
Airborne Troops: Countdown to D-Day •Airborne Troops^{PAL}	WideScreen Games	Mud Duck Productions	2005-01-07^{NA}		Yes	Yes
Airforce Delta Strike •Deadly Skies III^{PAL} •Airforce Delta: Blue Wing Knights^{JP}	KCE Studios	Konami	2004-02-03^{NA}	Yes	Yes	Yes
The Aka-Champion •Simple 2000 Series Vol. 94: The Aka-Champion – Come On Baby^{JP} •Come On Baby!^{KO}	Expotato	D3 Publisher, SCE Korea^{KO}	2005-12-29^{JP}	Yes ^{JP, KO}		
Akagi: Yami ni Furitatta Tensai •Simple 2000 Ultimate Series Vol. 19: Akagi^{JP}	Warashi	D3 Publisher	2002-12-12^{JP}	Yes		
Akai Ito	Success Corporation	Success Corporation	2004-10-21^{JP}	Yes		
Akane Iro ni Somaru Saka: Parallel	Feng	GN Software	2008-08-14^{JP}	Yes		
Akira Psycho Ball	KAZe	Bandai	2002-02-17^{PAL}	Yes	Yes	
Akudaikan	Global A	Global A	2002-08-08^{JP}	Yes		
Akudaikan 2: Mousouden	Global A	Global A	2003-07-31^{JP}	Yes		
Akudaikan 3	Global A	Global A	2007-03-01^{JP}	Yes		
Alan Hansen's Sports Challenge	The Code Monkeys	Oxygen Interactive	2007-10-26^{PAL}		Yes	
Alarm for Cobra 11 Vol. 2: Hot Pursuit •Alarm für Cobra 11 Vol II^{DE}	Davilex	Midas Interactive Entertainment	2005-06-10^{EU}		Yes	
Alarm für Cobra 11	Davilex	Midas Interactive Entertainment	2003-12-05^{PAL}		Yes	
Alex Ferguson's Player Manager 2001 •DSF Fußball Manager 2002^{DE} •Guy Roux Manager 2002^{FR}	Anco Software	3DO, Ubisoft	2001-09-21^{PAL}		Yes	
Alfa Romeo Racing Italiano •S.C.A.R.: Squadra Corse Alfa Romeo^{EU}	Milestone	Valcon Games	2005-06-24^{EU}		Yes	Yes
Alias	Acclaim Studios Cheltenham	Acclaim Entertainment	2004-04-05^{NA}		Yes	Yes
Alien Hominid	The Behemoth	O3 Entertainment, Zoo Digital Publishing^{EU}	2004-11-21^{NA}		Yes	Yes
Aliens in the Attic	Revistronic	Playlogic	2009-08-04^{AU}		Yes ^{AU}	
Aliens Versus Predator: Extinction	Zono	Electronic Arts	2003-07-30^{NA}	Yes ^{KO}	Yes	Yes
All Star Fighters •Simple 2000 Series Vol. 91: The All Star Kakutou^{JP}	D3 Publisher	D3 Publisher^{JP}, Essential Games^{PAL}	2005-12-15^{JP}	Yes ^{JP}	Yes	
All Star Pro-Wrestling	Square	Square	2000-06-08^{JP}	Yes		
All Star Pro-Wrestling II	Square	Square	2001-11-22^{JP}	Yes		
All Star Pro-Wrestling III	Square	Square	2003-08-07^{JP}	Yes		
All-Star Baseball 2002	Acclaim Studios Austin	Acclaim Entertainment	2001-03-12^{NA}	Yes	Yes	Yes
All-Star Baseball 2003	Acclaim Studios Austin	Acclaim Entertainment	2002-02-26^{NA}	Yes	Yes	Yes
All-Star Baseball 2004	Acclaim Studios Austin	Acclaim Entertainment	2003-03-01^{NA}	Yes ^{KO}	Yes	Yes
All-Star Baseball 2005	Acclaim Studios Austin	Acclaim Entertainment	2004-04-08^{NA}			Yes
Alone in the Dark	Hydravision Entertainment	Atari	2008-06-20^{EU}		Yes	Yes
Alone in the Dark: The New Nightmare	Spiral House	Infogrames	2001-09-28^{PAL}		Yes	
Alpine Racer 3	Namco	Namco^{JP}, Sony Computer Entertainment^{EU}	2002-03-28^{JP}	Yes	Yes	
Alpine Ski Racing 2007	49Games	RTL Playtainment; JoWooD Productions	2006-12-04^{PAL}		Yes	
Alpine Skiing 2005	49Games	RTL Playtainment; Midas Interactive Entertainment	2005-06-10^{PAL}		Yes	
Alter Echo	Outrage Games	THQ	2003-08-19^{NA}		Yes	Yes
Altered Beast •Jyuouki: Project Altered Beast^{JP, KO}	Wow Entertainment	Sega	2005-01-27^{JP, KO}	Yes ^{JP, KO}	Yes	
Alvin and the Chipmunks	Brash Entertainment	Brash Entertainment	2007-12-04^{NA}		Yes	Yes
Amagami •Amagami Ebikore + (different version)	Enterbrain	Enterbrain	2009-03-19^{JP}	Yes		
Amagoushi no Yakata	Fog	Nippon Ichi Software	2007-03-08^{JP}	Yes		
America Oudan Ultra-Quiz	DigiCube	DigiCube	2002-03-28^{JP}	Yes		
American Chopper	Creat Studio	Activision Value, Zoo Digital Publishing^{EU}	2004-11-25^{NA}		Yes	Yes
American Chopper 2: Full Throttle	Creat Studio	Activision, Zoo Digital Publishing^{EU}, Activision Value^{AU}	2005-11-20^{NA}		Yes	Yes
American Idol •Pop Idol^{EU}	Hothouse Creations	Codemasters	2003-11-07^{EU}		Yes ^{UK}	Yes ^{US}
An American Tail	Data Design Interactive	Blast! Entertainment Ltd	2007-07-12^{AU}		Yes	
AMF Xtreme Bowling •AMF Xtreme Bowling 2006^{EU}	Mud Duck Productions	Mud Duck Productions, Mastertronic^{EU}	2006-06-13^{NA}		Yes	Yes
Amplitude	Harmonix Music Systems	Sony Computer Entertainment	2003-03-24^{NA}		Yes	Yes
AND 1 Streetball	Black Ops Entertainment	Ubisoft	2006-06-06^{NA}		Yes	Yes
Angel Profile	GeneX	CyberFront	2007-09-27^{JP}	Yes		
Angel Wish: Kimi no Egao ni Chu!	Pionesoft	Pionesoft	2005-02-24^{JP}	Yes		
Angelic Concert	Success Corporation	Success Corporation	2003-03-13^{JP}	Yes		
Angelique Etoile	Ruby Party	Koei	2004-09-16^{JP}	Yes		
Angelique Trois	Ruby Party	Koei	2000-11-22^{JP}	Yes		
Angelique Trois: Aizouhen (Note: update for Angelique Trois.)	Ruby Party	Koei	2001-07-26^{JP}	Yes		
Angel's Feather	KID	KID	2004-03-11^{JP}	Yes		
Angel's Feather: Kuro no Zanei	Blue Impact	GN Software	2005-06-30^{JP}	Yes		
Animal Soccer World	The Code Monkeys	Phoenix Games	2005^{PAL}		Yes	
Animaniacs: The Great Edgar Hunt	Warthog	Ignition Entertainment	2005-06-24^{PAL}		Yes	
The Ant Bully	Artificial Mind and Movement	Midway Games	2006-07-24^{NA}		Yes	Yes
Antz Extreme Racing	Supersonic Software	Empire Interactive	2002-07-26^{EU}		Yes	Yes
Anubis II	Data Design Interactive	Metro 3D	2005-07-14^{PAL}		Yes	
Aoi no Mamade...	Idea Factory	Idea Factory	2004-10-28^{JP}	Yes		
Aoi Sora no Neosphere: Nanoca Flanka Hatsumei Koubouki 2~	Kogado Studio	Nippon Ichi Software	2007-02-22^{JP}	Yes		
Aoi Umi no Tristia: Nanoca Flanka Hatsumei Koubouki	Kogado Studio	Nippon Ichi Software	2005-08-11^{JP}	Yes		
Aoishiro	Success Corporation	Success Corporation	2008-05-15^{JP}	Yes		
Ape Escape 2 •Saru! Get You! 2^{JP, AS}	Sony Computer Entertainment	Sony Computer Entertainment, Ubisoft^{NA}	2002-07-18^{JP}	Yes ^{JP, AS}	Yes	Yes
Ape Escape 3 •Saru! Get You! 3^{JP, AS}	Sony Computer Entertainment	Sony Computer Entertainment	2005-07-12^{AS}	Yes ^{JP, AS, KO}	Yes	Yes
Ape Escape: Pumped & Primed •Gacha Mecha Stadium Saru Battle^{JP}	Japan Studio	Sony Computer Entertainment^{JP}, Ubisoft^{NA}	2004-07-01^{JP}	Yes		Yes
Apocripha/0	GN Software	GN Software	2004-10-28^{JP}	Yes		
Appleseed EX	DreamFactory	Sega	2007-02-15^{JP}	Yes		
Aqua Aqua •Aquaqua^{JP} •Aqua Aqua: Wetrix 2^{EU}	Zed Two Limited	Imagineer^{JP}, 3DO^{EU, NA}	2000-11-02^{JP}	Yes	Yes	Yes
Aqua Kids	Cinepix	Yuke's	2004-08-12^{JP}	Yes		
Aqua Teen Hunger Force Zombie Ninja Pro-Am	Creat Studio	Midway Games	2007-11-05^{NA}		Yes	Yes
Ar tonelico II: Melody of Metafalica •Ar tonelico II: Sekai ni Hibiku Shoujo Tachi no Metafalica^{JP}	Gust	Banpresto^{JP}, NIS America^{NA, EU}	2007-10-25^{JP}	Yes	Yes	Yes
Ar tonelico: Melody of Elemia •Ar tonelico: Sekai no Owari de Utai Tsudzukeru Shoujo^{JP}	Gust	Banpresto^{JP}, NIS America^{NA}, 505 Games^{EU}	2006-01-26^{JP}	Yes	Yes	Yes
Arabians Lost: The Engagement on Desert	QuinRose	Prototype, QuinRose	2007-10-11^{JP}	Yes		
Arc the Lad: End of Darkness •Arc the Lad: Generation^{JP}	Cattle Call	Sony Computer Entertainment^{JP}, Namco^{NA}	2004-11-03^{JP}	Yes		Yes
Arc the Lad: Twilight of the Spirits •Arc: Twilight of the Spirits^{EU} •Arc the Lad: Seirei no Koukon^{JP}	Cattle Call	Sony Computer Entertainment	2003-03-20^{JP}	Yes	Yes	Yes
The Arcade	Aqua Pacific	Liquid Games	2005-08-12^{PAL}		Yes	
Arcade Action: 30 Games	SG Diffusion	Phoenix Games	2004-11-19^{PAL}		Yes	
Arcade Classics Volume One	Play It!	Play It!	2006-04-21^{PAL}		Yes	
Arcade USA	Mere Mortals	Phoenix Games	2006-04-21^{AU}		Yes	
Arcana Heart	Examu	AQ Interactive^{JP}, Atlus^{US}	2007-10-11^{JP}	Yes		Yes
Arcobaleno!	Idea Factory	Idea Factory	2009-05-14^{JP}	Yes		
Arctic Thunder	Inland Productions	Midway Games	2001-09-17^{NA}		Yes	Yes
Are You Smarter Than a 5th Grader: Make the Grade	ImaginEngine	THQ	2008-10-20^{NA}			Yes
Area 51	Midway Studios Austin	Midway Games^{NA, PAL}, Success Corporation^{JP}	2005-04-25^{NA}	Yes	Yes	Yes
Arena Football	EA Tiburon	EA Sports	2006-02-07^{NA}			Yes
Arena Football: Road to Glory	Budcat	EA Sports	2007-02-20^{NA}			Yes
A-Ressha de Ikou 2001	Artdink	Artdink	2001-03-08^{JP}	Yes		
A-Ressha de Ikou 2001 Perfect Set	Artdink	Artdink	2002-01-01^{JP}	Yes		
Aria: The Natural ~Tooi Yume no Mirage~	Regista	Alchemist	2006-09-28^{JP}	Yes		
Aria: The Origination ~Aoi Hoshi no Il Cielo~	Regista	Alchemist	2008-06-26^{JP}	Yes		
Armen Noir	Otomate	Idea Factory	2010-12-09^{JP}	Yes		
Armored Core 2	FromSoftware	FromSoftware^{JP}, Agetec Inc.^{NA}, Ubisoft^{EU}	2000-08-03^{JP}	Yes	Yes	Yes
Armored Core 2: Another Age (Note: stand-alone expansion for Armored Core 2.)	FromSoftware	FromSoftware^{JP}, Agetec Inc.^{NA}, Metro3D^{EU}	2001-04-12^{JP}	Yes	Yes	Yes
Armored Core 3	FromSoftware	FromSoftware^{JP}, Agetec Inc.^{NA}, Metro3D^{EU}	2002-04-04^{JP}	Yes	Yes	Yes
Armored Core: Formula Front	FromSoftware	FromSoftware	2005-03-03^{JP}	Yes		
Armored Core: Last Raven	FromSoftware	FromSoftware^{JP}, Agetec Inc.^{NA}, 505 Games^{PAL}	2005-08-04^{JP}	Yes	Yes	Yes
Armored Core: Nexus	FromSoftware	FromSoftware^{JP}, Agetec Inc.^{NA}, Indie Games^{EU}	2004-03-18^{JP}	Yes	Yes	Yes
Armored Core: Nine Breaker	FromSoftware	FromSoftware^{JP}, Agetec Inc.^{NA}, 505 Games^{EU}	2004-10-28^{JP}	Yes	Yes	Yes
Army Men: Air Attack 2 •Army Men: Air Attack – Blade's Revenge^{EU}	3DO	3DO	2001-03-23^{NA}		Yes	Yes
Army Men: Green Rogue	3DO	3DO	2001-03-25^{NA}		Yes	Yes
Army Men: Major Malfunction	Global Star Software	Global Star Software	2006-08-04^{PAL}		Yes	
Army Men: RTS •Totsugeki! Army Men: Shijou Saishou no Sakusen^{JP}	Pandemic Studios	3DO^{NA, EU}, Capcom^{JP}	2002-03-27^{NA}	Yes	Yes	Yes
Army Men: Sarge's Heroes 2	3DO	3DO^{NA}, Midas^{EU}	2001-01-03^{EU}		Yes	Yes
Army Men: Sarge's War	Tactical Development	Global Star Software	2004-07-23^{PAL}		Yes	
Army Men: Soldiers of Misfortune	Big Blue Bubble	DSI Games	2008-11-04^{NA}			Yes
Art of Fighting Anthology •Ryuuko no Ken: Ten-Chi-Jin^{JP}	SNK Playmore	SNK Playmore, Crave Entertainment^{EU}	2005-11-06^{JP}	Yes	Yes	Yes
Arthur and the Invisibles: The Game •Arthur and the Minimoys^{EU} •Arthur and the Invisibles^{UK/AU}	Etranges Libellules	Atari	2007-01-09^{NA}		Yes	Yes
Ashita no Joe 2: The Anime Super Remix	Capcom	Capcom	2002-06-20^{JP}	Yes		
Ashita no Joe: Masshiro ni Moe Tsukiro!	Konami	Konami	2003-12-04^{JP}	Yes		
Ashita no Joe Touchi: Typing Namida Hashi	Dual	SunSoft	2001-03-29^{JP}	Yes		
Asobi ni Iku Yo!	Design Factory	Idea Factory	2006-07-27^{JP}	Yes		
Assault Suits Valken •Juusou Kihei Valken^{JP}	Psikyo	NCS^{JP}, X-Nauts^{KO}, 505 Game Street^{EU}	2004-08-26^{JP}	Yes ^{JP, KO}	Yes	
Asterix & Obelix: Kick Buttix •Asterix & Obelix XXL^{EU}	Etranges Libellules	Atari Europe	2004-03-19^{EU}		Yes	Yes
Asterix & Obelix XXL 2: Mission: Las Vegum	Etranges Libellules	Atari Europe	2006-06-30^{EU}		Yes	
Asterix at the Olympic Games	Etranges Libellules	Atari Europe	2008-02-28^{AU}		Yes	
Astro Boy •Astro Boy: Tetsuwan Atom^{JP}	Sonic Team	Sega	2004-03-18^{JP}	Yes	Yes	Yes
Astro Boy: The Video Game	High Voltage Software	D3 Publisher	2009-10-20^{NA}		Yes	Yes
Astro Kyuudan: Kessen!! Victory Kyuudanhen	Sunrise Interactive	Sunrise Interactive	2005-11-23^{JP}	Yes		
Atari Anthology	Digital Eclipse	Atari	2004-11-22^{NA}		Yes	Yes
Atelier Iris 2: The Azoth of Destiny •Iris no Atelier: Eternal Mana 2^{JP}	Gust	Gust^{JP}, NIS America^{NA}, Koei^{EU}, THQ^{AU}	2005-05-26^{JP}	Yes	Yes	Yes
Atelier Iris 3: Grand Phantasm •Iris no Atelier: Grand Fantasm^{JP}	Gust	Gust^{JP}, NIS America^{NA}, Koei^{EU}, THQ^{AU}	2006-06-29^{JP}	Yes	Yes	Yes
Atelier Iris: Eternal Mana •Iris no Atelier: Eternal Mana^{JP}	Gust	Gust^{JP}, NIS America^{NA}, Koei^{EU}, THQ^{AU}	2004-05-27^{JP}	Yes	Yes	Yes
Atelier Marie + Elie	Gust	Gust	2005-10-27^{JP}	Yes		
Athens 2004	Eurocom Entertainment Software	Sony Computer Entertainment	2004-07-02^{EU}	Yes	Yes	Yes
Atlantis III: The New World	Cryo Interactive	Cryo Interactive	2002-02-08^{EU}		Yes	
A-Train 6 •A6: A-Ressha de Ikou 6^{JP}	Artdink	Artdink^{JP}, Midas Interactive Entertainment^{EU}	2000-03-04^{JP}	Yes	Yes	
ATV Offroad Fury •ATV Offroad: All Terrain Vehicle	Rainbow Studios	Sony Computer Entertainment	2001-02-05^{NA}		Yes	Yes
ATV Offroad Fury 2	Rainbow Studios	Sony Computer Entertainment	2002-11-09^{NA}		Yes	Yes
ATV Offroad Fury 3	Climax Group	Sony Computer Entertainment^{NA}, SouthPeak Games^{EU}	2004-11-02^{NA}		Yes	Yes
ATV Offroad Fury 4	Climax Group	Sony Computer Entertainment	2006-10-31^{NA}		Yes	Yes
ATV Quad Power Racing 2	Climax Brighton	AKA Acclaim	2003-01-13^{NA}		Yes	Yes
Austin Mini Racing	Data Design Interactive	Metro3D Europe	2006-03-17^{EU}		Yes	
Australian Idol Sing	Milestone	Black Bean Games	2006-09-19^{AU}		Yes ^{AU}	
Auto Modellista •Auto Modellista: U.S.-Tuned^{JP} •Auto Modellista^{JP, PAL} (different version)	Capcom	Capcom	2002-08-22^{JP}	Yes ^{JP, KO}	Yes	Yes
Autobahn Raser: Das Spiel zum Film	Davilex	Davilex	2004-04-29^{EU}		Yes	
Autobahn Raser IV	Davilex	Davilex	2002-12-31^{EU}		Yes	
Avatar: The Last Airbender •Avatar: The Legend of Aang^{PAL}	THQ Studio Australia	THQ	2006-10-10^{NA}		Yes	Yes
Avatar: The Last Airbender – Into the Inferno •Avatar – The Legend of Aang: Into the Inferno^{PAL}	THQ Studio Australia	THQ	2008-10-13^{NA}		Yes	Yes
Avatar: The Last Airbender – The Burning Earth •Avatar: The Legend of Aang – The Burning Earth^{PAL}	THQ Studio Australia	THQ	2007-10-16^{NA}		Yes	Yes
Ayakashibito	Dimple Entertainment	Dimple Entertainment	2006-08-31^{JP}	Yes		
Azumi •Simple 2000 Ultimate Series Vol. 32: Azumi^{JP}	Gargoyle Mechanics	ESP Software, D3 Publisher	2005-03-24^{JP}	Yes		
Azur & Asmar	Wizarbox	Emme	2007-04-26^{PAL}		Yes	
Babe	Aqua Pacific	Blast! Entertainment Ltd	2006-10-13^{PAL}		Yes	
Backyard Baseball	Humongous Entertainment	Atari	2004-03-23^{NA}			Yes
Backyard Baseball '09	Humongous Entertainment	Atari	2008-06-10^{NA}			Yes
Backyard Baseball '10	Farsight Studios	Atari	2009-04-28^{NA}			Yes
Backyard Basketball •Junior Sports Basketball^{EU}	Humongous Entertainment	Atari	2003-10-21^{NA}		Yes	Yes
Backyard Football '08	FarSight Technologies	Atari	2007-10-16^{NA}			Yes
Backyard Football '09	FarSight Technologies	Atari	2008-10-21^{NA}			Yes
Backyard Football '10	FarSight Technologies	Atari	2009-10-20^{NA}			Yes
Backyard Football 2006	Humongous Entertainment	Atari	2005-10-04^{NA}			Yes
Backyard Sports: Baseball 2007	Game Brains	Atari	2006-09-05^{NA}			Yes
Backyard Sports: Basketball 2007	Game Brains	Atari	2007-02-13^{NA}			Yes
Backyard Wrestling 2: There Goes the Neighborhood	Paradox Development	Eidos Interactive	2004-11-16^{NA}	Yes	Yes	Yes
Backyard Wrestling: Don't Try This at Home	Paradox Development	Eidos Interactive	2003-10-07^{NA}	Yes	Yes	Yes
Bad Boys: Miami Takedown •Bad Boys II^{EU}	Blitz Games	Empire Interactive^{EU}, Crave Entertainment^{NA}	2004-02^{EU}		Yes	Yes
Bakufuu Slash! Kizna Arashi	Sony Computer Entertainment	Sony Computer Entertainment	2004-11-03^{JP}	Yes		
Bakugan Battle Brawlers	Now Production	Activision	2009-10-20^{NA}		Yes	Yes
Bakumatsu Renka: Karyuu Kenshiden	Vridge	D3 Publisher	2007-10-04^{JP}	Yes		
Bakumatsu Renka: Shinsengumi	Vridge	D3 Publisher	2004-12-22^{JP}	Yes		
Bakumatsu Rouman: Gekka no Kenshi 1-2	SNK Playmore	SNK Playmore	2006-01-12^{JP}	Yes		
Bakushou! Jinsei Kaidou	Taito	Taito	2004-03-18^{JP}	Yes		
Bakusou Dekotora Densetsu: Otoko Hanamichi Yume Roman	Dual	Spike	2003-01-23^{JP}	Yes		
Baldr Bullet: Equilibrium	TGL	Alchemist	2007-10-25^{JP}	Yes		
Baldr Force EXE	HuneX	Alchemist	2005-04-07^{JP}	Yes		
Baldur's Gate: Dark Alliance	Snowblind Studios	Interplay Entertainment^{EU, NA}, Pacific Century Cyber Works^{JP}	2001-12-02^{NA}	Yes	Yes	Yes
Baldur's Gate: Dark Alliance II	Black Isle Studios	Interplay Entertainment	2004-01-20^{NA}	Yes	Yes	Yes
Band Hero	BudCat	Activision	2009-11-03^{NA}		Yes	Yes
Barbarian •Warrior Blade: Rastan vs. Barbarian^{JP}	Saffire	Titus Software^{NA/EU}, Taito^{JP}	2002-06-27^{NA}	Yes	Yes	Yes
Barbie as the Island Princess	Human Soft	Activision	2007-10-30^{NA}		Yes	Yes
Barbie Horse Adventures: Riding Camp	Pixel Tales	Activision	2008-10-21^{NA}		Yes	Yes
Barbie Horse Adventures: Wild Horse Rescue	Blitz Games	Vivendi Universal Games	2003-11-04^{NA}		Yes	Yes
Barbie in the 12 Dancing Princesses	Blue Monkey Studios	Activision	2006-11-28^{NA}		Yes	Yes
The Bard's Tale	InXile Entertainment	InXile Entertainment^{NA}, Ubisoft^{EU}	2004-10-26^{NA}	Yes ^{KO}	Yes	Yes
Barnyard	Blue Tongue	THQ	2006-08-01^{NA}	Yes ^{KO}	Yes	Yes
Baroque •Baroque International^{JP}	Sting Entertainment	Sting Entertainment^{JP}, Atlus^{NA}, Rising Star Games^{EU}	2008-04-08^{NA}	Yes	Yes	Yes
The Baseball 2002: Battle Ball Park Sengen	Konami	Konami	2002-03-28^{JP}	Yes		
The Baseball 2003	Konami	Konami	2003-03-20^{JP}	Yes		
The Baseball 2003: Akikigou (Note: update for The Baseball 2003.)	Konami	Konami	2003-09-04^{JP}	Yes		
Baseball Live 2005	Namco	Namco	2005-04-21^{JP}	Yes		
Baseball Mania •Simple 2000 Series Vol. 57: The Pro Yakyuu 2004^{JP}	Tamsoft	D3 Publisher^{JP}, 505 Game Street^{EU}	2004-08-05^{JP}	Yes		
Basic Studio: Powerful Game Koubou (Note: includes three playable sample games.)	Artdink	Artdink	2001-04-19^{JP}	Yes		
Baskelian	Jorudan	Jorudan	2003-08-07^{JP}	Yes		
Basketball Xciting •Simple 2000 Series Vol. 30: The Street Baske – 3 on 3^{JP}	Tamsoft	D3 Publisher^{JP}, Agetec^{EU}	2003-05-29^{JP}	Yes	Yes	
Bass Landing 3	Sammy	Sammy	2003-02-27^{JP}	Yes		
Bass Strike	THQ	THQ^{EU, NA}, Capcom^{JP}	2001-09-26^{NA}	Yes	Yes	Yes
Batman Begins	Eurocom	Electronic Arts	2005-06-14^{NA}	Yes ^{KO}	Yes	Yes
Batman: Rise of Sin Tzu	Ubisoft Montreal	Ubisoft	2003-10-16^{NA}	Yes ^{KO}	Yes	Yes
Batman: Vengeance	Ubisoft Montreal	Ubisoft	2001-10-15^{NA}		Yes	Yes
Battle Assault 3 featuring Gundam Seed	Natsume Co., Ltd.	Bandai	2004-12-07^{NA}			Yes
Battle Engine Aquila	Lost Toys	Infogrames	2003-01-19^{NA}		Yes	Yes
Battle Gear 3	Nex Entertainment	Taito	2003-12-25^{JP}	Yes		
Battle of Sunrise	Sunrise Interactive	Sunrise Interactive	2008-04-10^{JP}	Yes		
The Battle of Yuu Yuu Hakusho: Shitou! Ankoku Bujutsukai! 120%	Dimps Corporation	Banpresto	2007-01-11^{JP}	Yes		
Battle Stadium D.O.N	Eighting	Namco Bandai Games	2006-07-20^{JP}	Yes		
Battlefield 2: Modern Combat	DICE	EA Games	2005-10-24^{NA}	Yes ^{JP, KO}	Yes	Yes
Battlestar Galactica	Warthog	Universal Interactive	2003-11-19^{NA}		Yes	Yes
B-Boy	FreeStyleGames	Evolved Games^{NA}, Sony Computer Entertainment^{PAL}	2006-09-29^{EU}		Yes	
BCV: Battle Construction Vehicles •Kensetsu Juuki Kenka Battle: Buchigire Kongou!!^{JP}	Artdink	Artdink^{JP}, Midas Interactive Entertainment^{EU}	2000-06-01^{JP}	Yes	Yes	
Beach King Stunt Racer	Davilex	Davilex	2005-08-28^{EU}		Yes	
Beast Sapp	Nippon Amuse	Nippon Amuse	2004-05-27^{JP}	Yes		
Beat Down: Fists of Vengeance •Beat Down^{JP}	Cavia	Capcom	2003-08-23^{NA}	Yes	Yes	Yes
Beatmania	Konami	Konami	2006-03-28^{NA}			Yes
BeatMania Da Da Da!!	Konami Digital Entertainment	Konami Digital Entertainment	2001-03-29^{JP}	Yes		
BeatMania Da Da Da!! The Best Da	Konami Digital Entertainment	Konami Digital Entertainment	2002-05-16^{JP}	Yes		
Beatmania IIDX 10th Style	Konami	Konami	2005-11-17^{JP}	Yes		
Beatmania IIDX 11: IIDX RED	Konami Digital Entertainment	Konami Digital Entertainment	2006-05-18^{JP}	Yes		
Beatmania IIDX 12: Happy Sky	Konami Digital Entertainment	Konami Digital Entertainment	2006-12-14^{JP}	Yes		
Beatmania IIDX 13: Distorted	Konami Digital Entertainment	Konami Digital Entertainment	2007-08-30^{JP}	Yes		
Beatmania IIDX 14: Gold	Konami Digital Entertainment	Konami Digital Entertainment	2008-05-29^{JP}	Yes		
Beatmania IIDX 15: DJ Troopers	Konami Digital Entertainment	Konami Digital Entertainment	2008-12-18^{JP}	Yes		
Beatmania IIDX 16: Empress + Premium Best	Konami Digital Entertainment	Konami Digital Entertainment	2009-10-15^{JP}	Yes		
Beatmania IIDX 3rd Style	Konami Computer Entertainment Japan	Konami	2000-11-02^{JP}	Yes		
Beatmania IIDX 4th Style: New Songs Collection	Konami Computer Entertainment Japan	Konami	2001-03-29^{JP}	Yes		
Beatmania IIDX 5th Style: New Songs Collection	Konami Computer Entertainment Japan	Konami	2001-08-30^{JP}	Yes		
Beatmania IIDX 6th Style: New Songs Collection	Konami Computer Entertainment Japan	Konami	2002-07-18^{JP}	Yes		
Beatmania IIDX 7th Style	Konami Computer Entertainment Studios	Konami	2004-03-13^{JP}	Yes		
Beatmania IIDX 8th Style	Konami Computer Entertainment Studios	Konami	2004-11-18^{JP}	Yes		
Beatmania IIDX 9th Style	Konami Computer Entertainment Studios	Konami	2005-03-21^{JP}	Yes		
Beck: The Game	Flagship	Marvelous Entertainment	2005-03-31^{JP}	Yes		
Bee Movie Game	Beenox	Activision	2007-10-30^{NA}		Yes	Yes
Ben 10: Alien Force	Monkey Bar Games	D3Publisher	2008-10-28^{NA}		Yes	Yes
Ben 10 Alien Force: Vilgax Attacks	Papaya Studio	D3Publisher	2009-10-27^{NA}		Yes	Yes
Ben 10: Protector Of Earth	High Voltage Software	D3 Publisher	2007-10-30^{NA}		Yes	Yes
Ben 10 Ultimate Alien: Cosmic Destruction	Papaya Studio	D3 Publisher	2010-10-05^{NA}		Yes	Yes
Ben Hur: Blood of Braves	Microids	Microids	2003-02-28^{EU}		Yes	
Berserk: Millennium Falcon Hen Seima Senki no Shō	Yuke's	Sammy	2004-10-07^{JP}	Yes		
Beta Bloc •Simple 2000 Series Vol. 106: The Block Kuzushi Quest – Dragon Kingdom^{JP}	Tamsoft	D3 Publisher^{JP}, Essential Games^{EU}	2006-09-14^{JP}	Yes	Yes	
Beverly Hills Cop	Atomic Planet Entertainment	Blast! Entertainment Ltd	2006^{EU}		Yes	
Beyond Good & Evil	Ubisoft Montpellier	Ubisoft	2003-11-11^{NA}		Yes	Yes
Biathlon 2008 •RTL Biathlon 2008^{EU}	49Games	RTL^{EU}, Conspiracy Entertainment^{NA}	2007^{EU}		Yes	Yes
The Bible Game	Crave Entertainment	Crave Entertainment	2005-10-23^{NA}		Yes	Yes
Big Idea's Veggie Tales: LarryBoy and the Bad Apple	Papaya Studio	Crave Entertainment	2006-08-08^{NA}		Yes ^{IT}	Yes
Big Mutha Truckers •Bakusou Convoy Densetsu – Otoko Hanamichi America Roman^{JP}	Eutechnyx	Empire Interactive^{EU}, THQ^{NA}, Spike^{JP}	2003-06-16^{NA}	Yes	Yes	Yes
Big Mutha Truckers 2 •Big Mutha Truckers 2: Truck Me Harder^{EU}	Eutechnyx	Xplosiv^{EU}, THQ^{NA}	2005-06-24^{EU}		Yes	Yes
The Bigs	Blue Castle Games	2K Sports	2007-06-25^{NA}			Yes
The Bigs 2	Blue Castle Games	2K Sports	2009-07-07^{NA}			Yes
Biker Mice from Mars	Creat Studios	The Game Factory	2006-11-17^{EU}		Yes	Yes
Bikkuri Mouse (Note: includes mini-games.)	Sony Computer Entertainment	Sony Computer Entertainment	2000-07-27^{JP}	Yes		
Billiards Xciting •Simple 2000 Series Vol. 14: The Billiard^{JP}	Agenda	D3 Publisher^{JP}, Agetec^{EU}	2002-11-14^{JP}	Yes	Yes	
Billy the Wizard: Rocket Broomstick Racing	Data Design Interactive	Metro3D	2006-01-27^{EU}		Yes	
Binchou-tan: Shiawasegoyomi	Marvelous Interactive	Marvelous Interactive	2007-04-26^{JP}	Yes		
Bionicle	Argonaut Games	Electronic Arts; Lego Interactive	2003-10-10^{EU}		Yes	Yes
Bionicle Heroes	Traveller's Tales	Eidos Interactive, Electronic Arts^{JP}	2006-11-14^{NA}	Yes	Yes	Yes
The Bishoujou Simulation RPG •Simple 2000 Series Vol. 21: The Bishoujo Simulation RPG – Moonlight Tale^{JP}	Yuki	D3 Publisher	2003-04-24^{JP}	Yes		
Bistro Cupid 2	Success	Success	2003-08-28^{JP}	Yes		
Black	Criterion Games	Electronic Arts	2006-02-24^{EU}	Yes ^{JP, KO}	Yes	Yes
Black & Bruised	Digital Fiction	Majesco^{NA}, Vivendi Universal Games^{EU}	2003-01-26^{NA}		Yes	Yes
Black Cat: Kikai Shikake no Tenshi	Capcom	Capcom	2006-03-30^{JP}	Yes		
Black Market Bowling	Tantalus	Midas Interactive Entertainment	2005-06-10^{PAL}		Yes	
Black/Matrix II	Flight-Plan	NEC Interchannel	2002-03-28^{JP}	Yes		
Blade II	Mucky Foot	Activision	2002-09-02^{NA}		Yes	Yes
Blazing Souls	Neverland	Idea Factory	2006-01-17^{JP}	Yes ^{JP, KO}		
Bleach: Blade Battlers	Racjin	Sony Computer Entertainment	2006-10-12^{JP}	Yes		
Bleach: Blade Battlers 2	Racjin	Sony Computer Entertainment	2007-09-27^{JP}	Yes		
Bleach: Erabareshi Tamashii	Aspect	Sony Computer Entertainment	2005-08-04^{JP}	Yes		
Bleach: Hanatareshi Yabou	Dingo Inc.	Sony Computer Entertainment	2006-02-16^{JP}	Yes		
Blitz: The League	Midway Games	Midway Games	2005-10-17^{NA}			Yes
Blokus Club with Bumpy Trot	Irem	Irem	2005-11-17^{JP}	Yes		
Blood Omen 2	Crystal Dynamics	Eidos Interactive	2002-03-21^{NA}		Yes	Yes
Blood+: One Night Kiss	Grasshopper Manufacture	Namco Bandai Games	2006-08-31^{JP}	Yes		
Blood+: Souyoku no Battle Rondo	Sony Computer Entertainment	Sony Computer Entertainment	2006-07-27^{JP}	Yes		
Blood: The Last Vampire - Gekan	Sony Computer Entertainment	Sony Computer Entertainment	2000-12-21^{JP}	Yes		
Blood: The Last Vampire - Joukan	Sony Computer Entertainment	Sony Computer Entertainment	2000-12-21^{JP}	Yes		
Blood Will Tell: Tezuka Osamu's Dororo •Dororo^{JP}	Sega	Sega	2004-09-09^{JP}	Yes	Yes	Yes
BloodRayne	Terminal Reality	Majesco^{NA}, Vivendi Universal Games^{EU}, Electronic Arts^{JP}	2002-10-15^{NA}	Yes	Yes	Yes
BloodRayne 2	Terminal Reality	Majesco^{NA}, THQ^{EU}	2004-10-12^{NA}		Yes	Yes
Bloody Roar 3	Eighting	Hudson Soft^{JP}, Activision^{NA}, Virgin Interactive^{EU}	2001-03-01^{JP}	Yes	Yes	Yes
Bloody Roar 4	Eighting	Hudson Soft^{JP, NA}, Konami^{EU}	2003-11-11^{NA}	Yes	Yes	Yes
BlowOut	Terminal Reality	Majesco^{NA}, Zoo Digital Publishing^{EU}	2003-11-06^{NA}		Yes	Yes
BMX XXX	Z-Axis	AKA Acclaim	2002-11-19^{NA}		Yes	Yes
Board Games Gallery	Phoenix Games	Phoenix Games	2005-03-25^{NA}		Yes	
Bob the Builder Eye Toy	Atomic Planet Entertainment	Blast! Entertainment Ltd	2007-07-20^{EU}		Yes	
Bob the Builder: Festival of Fun	Atomic Planet Entertainment	Blast! Entertainment Ltd	2007-11-30^{EU}		Yes	
Boboboubo Boubobo: Hajike Matsuri	Hudson Soft	Hudson Soft	2003-03-20^{JP}	Yes		
Boboboubo Boubobo: Shuumare! Taikan Boubobo	Hudson Soft	Hudson Soft	2004-12-16^{JP}	Yes		
Bode Miller Alpine Skiing •Ski Alpin 2006^{EU}	49Games	RTL^{EU}, Valcon Games^{NA}	2005-12-07^{EU}		Yes	Yes
The Boku no Machidzukuri 2 – Machi-ing Maker 2.1 •Simple 2000 Series Vol. 121: The Boku no Machidzukuri 2 – Machi-ing Maker 2.1^{JP} (Note: update for MetropolisMania 2.)	Indi	D3 Publisher	2007-11-29^{JP}	Yes		
Boku no Natsuyasumi 2: Umi no Bouken Hen	Millennium Kitchen	Sony Computer Entertainment	2002-07-11^{JP}	Yes		
Boku wa Chiisai	Victor Interactive Software	Victor Interactive Software	2002-07-11^{JP}	Yes		
Bokura no Kazoku	Millennium Kitchen	Sony Computer Entertainment	2005-03-24^{JP}	Yes		
Bolt	Avalanche Software	Disney Interactive Studios	2008-11-10^{NA}		Yes	Yes
Bombastic •Xi Go^{JP}	Shift	Capcom^{EU, NA}, Sony Computer Entertainment^{JP}	2002-12-19^{JP}	Yes	Yes	Yes
Bomberman Hardball •Bomberman Battles^{JP}	Hudson Soft	Hudson Soft^{JP}Ubisoft^{EU}	2004-10-07^{JP}	Yes	Yes	
Bomberman Jetters	Hudson Soft	Hudson Soft	2002-12-19^{JP}	Yes		
Bomberman Kart •Bomberman Kart DX^{JP} (different version)	Racjin, Hudson Soft	Hudson Soft^{JP}Konami^{EU}	2001-12-20^{JP}	Yes	Yes	
Bomberman Land 2	Racjin	Hudson Soft	2003-07-17^{JP}	Yes		
Bomberman Land 3	Racjin	Hudson Soft	2005-08-04^{JP}	Yes		
Boogie	Pipeworks Studios	Electronic Arts	2007-11-12^{NA}		Yes	Yes
Bouken Jidai Katsugeki: Goemon	Konami	Konami	2000-12-21^{JP}	Yes		
Bouken Shounen Club Gahou	Jorudan	Jorudan	2003-09-25^{JP}	Yes		
Bouken-Ou Beet: Darkness Century	Shade	Bandai	2005-04-28^{JP}	Yes		
Boukoku no Aegis 2035: Warship Gunner	Koei	Koei	2005-07-21^{JP}	Yes		
The Bouncer	DreamFactory	Square^{JP}, Square Electronic Arts^{NA}, Sony Computer Entertainment^{PAL}	2000-12-23^{JP}	Yes	Yes	Yes
Bowling Xciting •Simple 2000 Series Vol. 24: The Bowling Hyper^{JP}	Tamsoft	D3 Publisher^{JP}, Agetec^{EU}	2003-03-27^{JP}	Yes	Yes	
Boxing Champions •Simple 2000 Series Vol. 7: The Boxing – Real First Fighter^{JP}	Tamsoft	D3 Publisher^{JP}, Midas Interactive Entertainment^{EU}	2002-07-25^{JP}	Yes	Yes	
Bratz: Forever Diamondz	Blitz Games	THQ	2006-09-18^{NA}		Yes	Yes
Bratz: Girlz Really Rock	Blitz Games	THQ	2008-10-13^{NA}		Yes	Yes
Bratz: Rock Angelz	Blitz Games	THQ	2005-10-06^{NA}		Yes	Yes
Bratz: The Movie	Blitz Games	THQ	2007-09-25^{NA}		Yes	Yes
Brave Story: Wataru no Bouken	SIMS Co., Ltd.	Sony Computer Entertainment	2006-07-06^{JP}	Yes		
Brave: The Search for Spirit Dancer	Vis Entertainment	Sony Computer Entertainment^{EU}, SouthPeak Games^{NA}	2005-09-02^{EU}		Yes	Yes
Bravo Music: Chou-Meikyokuban	Sony Computer Entertainment	Sony Computer Entertainment	2002-01-17^{JP}	Yes		
Bravo Music: Christmas Edition	Sony Computer Entertainment	Sony Computer Entertainment	2001-11-22^{JP}	Yes		
Breath of Fire: Dragon Quarter •Breath of Fire V: Dragon Quarter^{JP, KO}	Capcom Production Studio 3	Capcom	2002-11-14^{JP}	Yes ^{JP, KO}	Yes	Yes
Breeders' Cup World Thoroughbred Championships	4J Studios	Bethesda Studios	2005-09-29^{NA}			Yes
Brian Lara International Cricket 2005 •Ricky Ponting International Cricket 2005^{AU}	Codemasters	Codemasters	2005-07-21^{EU}		Yes	
Brian Lara International Cricket 2007 •Ricky Ponting International Cricket 2007^{AU}•Yuvraj Singh International Cricket 2007^{IN}	Codemasters	Codemasters	2007-03-23^{EU}		Yes	
Britney's Dance Beat	Metro Graphics	THQ	2002-05-08^{NA}	Yes	Yes	Yes
Broken Sword: The Sleeping Dragon •Baphomets Fluch: Der schlafende Drache^{DE} •Broken Sword: Nemureru Ryuu no Densetsu^{JP}	Revolution Software	THQ^{EU}, Marvelous Entertainment^{JP}	2003-11-14^{EU}	Yes	Yes	
Brothers in Arms: Earned in Blood •Brothers in Arms: Meiyo no Daishou^{JP}	Gearbox Software	Ubisoft	2005-10-27^{NA}	Yes	Yes	Yes
Brothers in Arms: Road to Hill 30 •Brother in Arms: Road to Hill 30^{KO}	Gearbox Software	Ubisoft	2005-02-15^{NA}	Yes ^{JP, KO}	Yes	Yes
Brunswick Pro Bowling	Point of View	Crave Entertainment^{NA}, 505 Games^{PAL}	2007-08-21^{NA}		Yes	Yes
Buccaneer •Simple 2000 Series Vol. 96: The Kaizoku – Gaikotsu Ippaire~tsu!^{JP}	DigitalWare	D3 Publisher^{JP}, Essential Games^{EU}	2006-04-06^{JP}	Yes	Yes	
Buffy the Vampire Slayer: Chaos Bleeds	Eurocom	Vivendi Universal Games	2003-08-27^{NA}		Yes	Yes
Bujingai: The Forsaken City •Bujingai^{JP} •Bujingai: Swordmaster^{EU}	Taito	Taito^{JP}, BAM! Entertainment^{NA}, 505 Game Street^{EU}	2003-12-25^{JP}	Yes	Yes	Yes
Bully •Canis Canem Edit^{PAL}	Rockstar Vancouver	Rockstar Games^{NA, PAL}, Bethesda Softworks^{JP}	2006-10-17^{NA}	Yes	Yes	Yes
Burnout	Criterion Games	Acclaim Entertainment	2001-11-01^{NA}		Yes	Yes
Burnout 2: Point of Impact	Criterion Games	Acclaim Entertainment^{EU, NA}, Sammy^{JP}	2002-09-30^{NA}	Yes	Yes	Yes
Burnout 3: Takedown	Criterion Games	EA Games	2004-09-07^{NA}	Yes	Yes	Yes
Burnout Dominator	Criterion Games	Electronic Arts	2007-03-06^{NA}	Yes	Yes	Yes
Burnout Revenge	Criterion Games	Electronic Arts	2005-09-13^{NA}	Yes	Yes	Yes
The Bushido •Simple 2000 Series Vol. 28: The Bushido – Tujigiri Ichidai	ALU	D3 Publisher	2003-05-29^{JP}	Yes		
Busin 0: Wizardry Alternative Neo	Racjin	Atlus	2003-11-13^{JP}	Yes		
Busou Renkin: Yokosu Papillon Park e	Shade	Marvelous	2007-06-28^{JP}	Yes		
Bust-A-Bloc •Simple 2000 Series Vol. 5: The Block Kuzushi Hyper^{JP}	Tamsoft	D3 Publisher^{JP}, Midas Interactive Entertainment^{EU}	2002-05-30^{JP}	Yes	Yes	
Butt-Ugly Martians: Zoom or Doom!	Crave Entertainment	Vivendi Universal Games^{EU}, Crave Entertainment^{NA}	2002-12-06^{EU}		Yes	Yes
Buzz!: Brain of the World	Relentless Software	Sony Computer Entertainment	2009-02-13^{NO}		Yes	
Buzz! Junior: Ace Racers	Cohort Studios	Sony Computer Entertainment	2008-02-24^{EU}		Yes	
Buzz! Junior: Dino Den	Cohort Studios	Sony Computer Entertainment	2008-02-22^{EU}		Yes	
Buzz! Junior: Jungle Party	Magenta Software	Sony Computer Entertainment	2006-10-20^{EU}		Yes	Yes
Buzz! Junior: Monster Rumble	FreeStyleGames & Magenta Software	Sony Computer Entertainment	2007-11-02^{EU}		Yes	
Buzz! Junior: Robo Jam	Cohort Studios	Sony Computer Entertainment	2007-05-27^{EU}		Yes	Yes
Buzz!: The BIG Quiz	Relentless Software	Sony Computer Entertainment	2006-03-17^{EU}		Yes	
Buzz!: The Hollywood Quiz	Relentless Software	Sony Computer Entertainment	2007-10-19^{EU}		Yes ^{EU, AU}	Yes
Buzz!: The Mega Quiz	Relentless Software	Sony Computer Entertainment	2007-04-27^{EU}		Yes	Yes
Buzz!: The Music Quiz	Relentless Software	SCEE	2005-10-21^{EU}		Yes	
Buzz!: The Pop Quiz	Relentless Software	Sony Computer Entertainment	2008-03-14^{EU}		Yes ^{EU, AU}	
Buzz!: The Schools Quiz	Relentless Software	Sony Computer Entertainment	2008-01-11^{EU}		Yes	
Buzz!: The Sports Quiz	Relentless Software	Sony Computer Entertainment	2006-11-10^{EU}		Yes	
Cabela's African Safari	Sand Grain Studios	Activision	2006-10-17^{NA}		Yes ^{AU}	Yes
Cabela's Alaskan Adventures	Sand Grain Studios	Activision	2006-09-19^{NA}			Yes
Cabela's Big Game Hunter (2007)	Sand Grain Studios	Activision	2007-11-06^{NA}		Yes	Yes
Cabela's Big Game Hunter (2002)	Sand Grain Studios	Activision	2002-11-26^{NA}		Yes	Yes
Cabela's Big Game Hunter 2005 Adventures	Sand Grain Studios	Activision	2004-11-10^{NA}		Yes	Yes
Cabela's Dangerous Hunts	Sand Grain Studios	Activision^{NA}, Zoo Digital Publishing^{EU}	2003-11-11^{NA}		Yes	Yes
Cabela's Dangerous Hunts 2	Sand Grain Studios	Activision	2005-11-16^{NA}		Yes ^{AU}	Yes
Cabela's Dangerous Hunts 2009 •Cabela's Dangerous Adventures^{PAL}	Sand Grain Studios	Activision	2008-09-23^{NA}		Yes	Yes
Cabela's Deer Hunt: 2004 Season •Cabela's Deer Hunt: Season Opener^{NA}	Sand Grain Studios	Activision	2003-08-27^{NA}			Yes
Cabela's Deer Hunt: 2005 Season	Sand Grain Studios	Activision	2004-08-26^{NA}			Yes
Cabela's Legendary Adventures	Sand Grain Studios	Activision	2008-09-17^{NA}			Yes
Cabela's Monster Bass	Sand Grain Studios	Activision	2007-11-19^{NA}			Yes
Cabela's North American Adventures	Fun Labs	Activision	2010-09-14^{NA}			Yes
Cabela's Outdoor Adventures (2005)	Sand Grain Studios	Activision^{NA}, Zoo Digital Publishing^{EU}	2005-09-14^{NA}		Yes	Yes
Cabela's Outdoor Adventures (2009)	Sand Grain Studios	Activision	2009-09-09^{NA}			Yes
Cabela's Trophy Bucks	Sand Grain Studios	Activision	2007-09-19^{NA}			Yes
Cafe Lindbergh: Summer Season	PrincessSoft	PrincessSoft	2005-03-31^{JP}	Yes		
Cafe Little Wish: Mahou no Recipe	PrincessSoft	PrincessSoft	2003-05-29^{JP}	Yes		
Cake Mania: Baker's Challenge	Coresoft	Destineer	2008-10-07^{NA}			Yes
Call of Duty 2: Big Red One	Treyarch	Activision^{NA, PAL}, Konami^{JP}	2005-11-01^{NA}	Yes	Yes	Yes
Call of Duty 3	Treyarch	Activision	2006-11-07^{NA}		Yes	Yes
Call of Duty: Finest Hour	Spark Unlimited	Activision^{EU, NA}, Capcom^{JP}	2004-11-16^{NA}	Yes	Yes	Yes
Call of Duty: World at War – Final Fronts	Rebellion Developments	Activision	2008-11-10^{NA}	Yes ^{KO}	Yes	Yes
Cambrian QTS: Kaseki ni Nattemo	Tenky	Global A	2003-12-11^{JP}	Yes		
Canaria	Frontwing	NEC Interchannel	2003-04-10^{JP}	Yes		
Canvas 2: Deep Red-colored Palette •Canvas 2: Akane-iro no Palette^{JP}	Kadokawa Games	NEC Interchannel	2006-01-26^{JP}	Yes		
Canvas 3: Tanshoku no Pastel	GN Software	NEC Interchannel	2009-09-17^{JP}	Yes		
Canvas: Sepia-colored Motif •Canvas: Sepia-iro no Motif^{JP}	Cocktail Soft	NEC Interchannel	2003-04-10^{JP}	Yes		
Capcom Classics Collection Vol. 1	Backbone Entertainment	Capcom	2005-09-27^{NA}	Yes	Yes	Yes
Capcom Classics Collection Vol. 2	Backbone Entertainment	Capcom	2006-11-24^{NA}		Yes	Yes
Capcom Fighting Evolution •Capcom Fighting Jam^{EU, JP, KO}	Capcom	Capcom	2004-11-16^{NA}	Yes ^{JP, KO}	Yes	Yes
Capcom vs. SNK 2: Mark of the Millennium 2001 •Capcom vs. SNK 2: Millionaire Fighting 2001^{JP}	Capcom	Capcom	2001-09-13^{JP}	Yes	Yes	Yes
Captain Scarlet	Brain in a Jar	Blast! Entertainment Ltd	2006-12-05^{EU}		Yes	
Captain Tsubasa	Bandai	Bandai	2006-10-19^{JP}	Yes		
Car Racing Challenge •Simple 2000 Series Vol. 68: The Tousou Highway: Nagoya – Tokyo^{JP}	Tamsoft	D3 Publisher^{JP}, 505 Game Street^{EU}	2004-12-09^{JP}	Yes	Yes	
Card Captor Sakura: Sakura-Chan to Asobo!	NHK	NHK	2004-12-04^{JP}	Yes		
Cardinal Arc: Konton no Fuusatsu	Idea Factory	Idea Factory	2003-08-07^{JP}	Yes		
Carmen Sandiego: The Secret of the Stolen Drums	A2M	BAM! Entertainment	2004-03-05^{EU}		Yes	Yes
Carol Vorderman's Sudoku	Atomic Planet Entertainment	Eidos Interactive^{NA}, Xplosiv^{EU}	2006-08-25^{EU}		Yes	Yes
Cars	Rainbow Studios	THQ	2006-06-06^{NA}	Yes ^{JP, KO}	Yes	Yes
Cars Mater-National Championship	Rainbow Studios	THQ	2007-10-29^{NA}		Yes	Yes
Cars Race-O-Rama	Incinerator Studios	THQ	2009-10-12^{NA}		Yes	Yes
CART Fury Championship Racing	Midway	Midway	2001-05-25^{NA}		Yes	Yes
Cart Kings	Gameshastra Inc.	Sony Computer Entertainment	2011-08-03^{IN}		Yes ^{IN}	
Cartagra	KID	KID	2005-12-15^{JP}	Yes		
Cartoon Kingdom	Phoenix Games	Phoenix Games	2007^{EU}		Yes	
Cartoon Network Racing	Eutechnyx	The Game Factory	2006-12-04^{NA}		Yes	Yes
Carwash Tycoon	Aqua Pacific	Phoenix Games	2006-09-29^{EU}		Yes	
Casino Challenge	Aqua Pacific	Play It!	2004-01-16^{EU}		Yes	
Casper and The Ghostly Trio	Data Design Interactive	Blast! Entertainment Ltd	2007-02-10^{EU}		Yes	
Casper: Spirit Dimensions	Lucky Chicken	TDK Mediactive	2001-09-30^{NA}		Yes	Yes
Casper's Scare School	Data Design Interactive	Blast! Entertainment Ltd	2008-02-01^{EU}		Yes	
Castle Fantasia: Arihato Senki	Studio e.go!	GN Software	2007-08-09^{JP}	Yes		
Castle Fantasia: Erenshia Senki Plus Stories	Kadokawa Games	Kadokawa Games	2005-02-24^{JP}	Yes		
Castle Shikigami 2 •Shikigami no Shiro 2^{JP} •Castle Shikigami II: War of the Worlds^{EU}	Alfa System	Taito^{JP}, XS Games^{NA}, Play It!^{EU}	2004-01-29^{JP}	Yes	Yes	Yes
Castlevania: Curse of Darkness •Akumajou Dracula: Yami no Juin^{JP}	Konami TYO	Konami	2005-11-01^{NA}	Yes	Yes	Yes
Castlevania: Lament of Innocence •Castlevania^{EU.JP}	Konami TYO	Konami	2003-10-21^{NA}	Yes	Yes	Yes
Castleween •Mahou no Pumpkin^{JP}	Kalisto Entertainment	Wanadoo Edition^{EU}, MTO^{JP}	2002-11-29^{EU}	Yes	Yes	
Catwoman	Argonaut Games	Electronic Arts	2004-07-20^{NA}		Yes	Yes
CaveMan Rock	Phoenix Games	Phoenix Games	2007^{EU}		Yes	
Cel Damage Overdrive	Pseudo Interactive	Play It!	2002-12-12^{EU}		Yes	
Centre Court: Hard Hitter •Magical Sports: Hard Hitter^{JP}	Magical Company	Magical Company^{JP}, Midas Interactive Entertainment^{EU}	2001-06-28^{JP}	Yes	Yes	
Chaindive	Alvion	Sony Computer Entertainment	2003-10-16^{JP}	Yes		
Champions of Norrath: Realms of Everquest	Snowblind Studios	Sony Online Entertainment	2004-02-10^{NA}		Yes	Yes
Champions: Return to Arms	Snowblind Studios	Sony Online Entertainment	2005-02-07^{NA}		Yes	Yes
Championship Manager 2006	Beautiful Game Studios	Eidos Interactive	2006-05-05^{EU}		Yes	
Championship Manager 2007	Beautiful Game Studios	Eidos Interactive	2007-03-16^{EU}		Yes	
Championship Manager 5	Beautiful Game Studios	Eidos Interactive	2005-05-13^{PAL}		Yes	
Chandragupta: Warrior Prince	Immersive Games	Sony Computer Entertainment	2009-09-28^{IN}		Yes ^{IN}	
Chanter♯: Kimi no Uta ga Todoitara	Terios	Interchannel	2007-08-30^{JP}	Yes		
Chaos Field: New Order	MileStone Inc.	MileStone Inc.	2005-12-15^{JP}	Yes		
Chaos Legion	Capcom	Capcom	2003-03-06^{JP}	Yes ^{JP, KO}	Yes	Yes
Chaos Wars	Idea Factory	Idea Factory^{JP}, O~3 Entertainment^{NA}	2006-09-21^{JP}	Yes		Yes
Charlie and the Chocolate Factory	High Voltage Software	Global Star Software^{NA}, 2K Games^{EU}	2005-07-11^{NA}		Yes	Yes
Charlie's Angels	Neko Entertainment	Ubisoft	2003-07-04^{EU}		Yes	
Charlotte's Web	Atomic Planet Entertainment	Blast! Entertainment Ltd	2006-11-14^{EU}		Yes	
Cheggers Party Quiz	Oxygen Games	Oxygen Games	2007-10-26^{EU}		Yes	
Chemist Tycoon	Aqua Pacific	Phoenix Games	2006-09-29^{EU}		Yes	
Chenuen no San Goku Shi	Game Arts	ESP Software	2001-11-01^{JP}	Yes		
Cherry Blossom	Takuyo	Takuyo	2004-12-30^{JP}	Yes		
Chess Challenger	Play It!	Play It!	2004-01-16^{EU}		Yes	
Chess Crusade	Slam Games	Zoo Digital Publishing	2008–09^{EU}		Yes	
Chessmaster	Ubisoft	Ubisoft	2003-04-25^{EU}		Yes	Yes
Choaniki: Sei Naru Protein Densetsu	Global A	Global A	2003-10-30^{JP}	Yes		
Chobits: Chii dake no Hito	Affect	Broccoli	2003-05-15^{JP}	Yes		
Chocolat: Maid Cafe Curio	HuneX	Alchemist	2005-06-30^{JP}	Yes		
ChopLifter: Crisis Shield	ASK	Xicat Interactive	2004-02-13^{EU}		Yes	
ChoroQ •Choro Q HG 4^{JP}	Barnhouse Effect	Takara^{JP}, Atlus^{NA}, Zoo Digital Publishing^{EU}	2003-11-27^{JP}	Yes	Yes	Yes
ChoroQ Works	Atlus	Atlus	2005-05-26^{JP}	Yes		
Chou Gouka! Quiz Ketteiban •TBS All-Star Kansha Matsuri Vol .1: Chou Gouka! Quiz Ketteiban^{JP}	Hudson Soft	Hudson Soft	2003-04-17^{JP}	Yes		
Chou-jikuu Yousai Macross	Sega AM2	Bandai	2003-10-23^{JP}	Yes		
Choukousoku Igo	Success	Success	2001-02-15^{JP}	Yes		
Choukousoku Mahjong	Success	Success	2000-12-21^{JP}	Yes		
Choukousoku Mahjong Plus	Success	Success	2002-02-28^{JP}	Yes		
Choukousoku Reversi	Success	Success	2000-12-21^{JP}	Yes		
Choukousoku Shogi	Success	Success	2001-02-15^{JP}	Yes		
Chou-Saisoku! Zokusha King BU	Tamsoft	D3 Publisher	2004-04-28^{JP}	Yes		
Chou-Saisoku! Zokusha King BU no BU •Simple 2000 Ultimate Series Vol.25: Chou-Saisoku! Zokusha King BU no BU^{JP} (Note: update for Chou-Saisoku! Zokusha King BU.)	Tamsoft	D3 Publisher	2005-05-26^{JP}	Yes		
The Chronicles of Narnia: Prince Caspian	Traveller's Tales	Disney Interactive Studios	2008-05-15^{NA}		Yes	Yes
The Chronicles of Narnia: The Lion, The Witch and The Wardrobe •Narnia Koku Monogatari: Lion to Majo^{JP}	Traveller's Tales	Buena Vista Games^{EU, NA}, D3 Publisher^{JP}	2005-11-14^{NA}	Yes	Yes	Yes
Chu~Kana Janshi	GeneX	CyberFront	2004-12-28^{JP}	Yes		
Chulip	Punchline	Victor Interactive^{JP}, Natsume Inc.^{NA}	2002-10-03^{JP}	Yes		Yes
CID The Dummy	Twelve Games	Oxygen Games	2009-04-17^{EU}		Yes	Yes
Cinderella	Phoenix Games	Phoenix Games	2006-10-13^{EU}		Yes	
Circuit Blasters	Supersonic Software	Metro3D	2005-07-21^{EU}		Yes	
Circus Maximus: Chariot Wars	Kodiak Interactive	THQ	2002-07-05^{PAL}		Yes	
City Crisis	Syscom Entertainment	Syscom Entertainment^{JP}, Take-Two Interactive^{EU, NA}	2001-06-28^{JP}	Yes	Yes	Yes
City Soccer Challenge	Data Design Interactive	Phoenix Games	2006-07-28^{EU}		Yes	
Clannad	Visual Arts	Interchannel	2006-02-23^{JP}	Yes		
Classic British Motor Racing	Data Design Interactive	Metro3D	2006-02-10^{EU}		Yes	
Clear: Atarashii Kaze no Fuku Oka de	Moonstone	Sweets	2009-02-19^{JP}	Yes		
Clever Kids-Dino Land	Midas Interactive Entertainment	Midas Interactive Entertainment	2007-11-02^{EU}		Yes	
Clever Kids-Pony World	Midas Interactive Entertainment	Midas Interactive Entertainment	2007-11-02^{EU}		Yes	
Climax Tennis: WTA Tour Edition	Konami	Konami	2002-01-17^{JP}	Yes		
Clock Tower 3	Capcom Production Studio 3	Capcom	2002-12-12^{JP}	Yes	Yes	Yes
Clock Zero: Shuuen no Ichibyou	Otomate	Idea Factory	2010-11-25^{JP}	Yes		
Clover Heart's: Looking for Happiness	ALcot	NEC Interchannel	2004-08-26^{JP}	Yes		
Clover no Kuni no Alice	Quinrose	Prototype	2010-04-15^{JP}	Yes		
Club Football •Club Football Ajax Amsterdam •Club Football Arsenal •Club Football Aston Villa - Prepared •Club Football FC Barcelona •Club Football FC Bayern München •Club Football Borussia Dortmund/BVB09 •Club Football The Celtic Football Club 1888 •Club Football Chelsea FC •Club Football Hamburger Sport Verein •Club Football FC Internazionale Milano 1908 •Club Football Juventus •Club Football Leeds United FC •Club Football Liverpool Football Club Est 1892 •Club Football Manchester United •Club Football Associazione Calcio Milan 1899 •Club Football Rangers Football Club - Ready •Club Football Real Madrid Club de Fútbol	Codemasters	Codemasters	2003-10-10^{EU}		Yes	
Club Football 2005 •Club Football 2005 Ajax Amsterdam •Club Football 2005 Arsenal •Club Football 2005 Aston Villa - Prepared •Club Football 2005 FC Barcelona •Club Football 2005 FC Bayern München •Club Football 2005 Birmingham City Football Club 1875 •Club Football 2005 Borussia Dortmund/BVB09 •Club Football 2005 The Celtic Football Club 1888 •Club Football 2005 Chelsea FC •Club Football 2005 Hamburger Sport Verein •Club Football 2005 FC Internazionale Milano 1908 •Club Football 2005 Juventus •Club Football 2005 Liverpool Football Club Est 1892 •Club Football 2005 Manchester United •Club Football 2005 Olympique de Marseille - Droit au but •Club Football 2005 Associazione Calcio Milan 1899 •Club Football 2005 Newcastle United •Club Football 2005 Paris Saint-Germain 1970 •Club Football 2005 Rangers Football Club - Ready •Club Football 2005 Real Madrid Club de Fútbol •Club Football 2005 Tottenham Hotspur FC - Audere Est-Facere	Codemasters	Codemasters	2004-10-15^{EU}		Yes	
Clumsy Shumsy	Phoenix Games	Phoenix Games	2006-10-27^{EU}		Yes	
Cluster Edge	Matrix Software	Marvelous Entertainment	2006-09-14^{JP}	Yes		
C@M-Station (Note: includes playable board games alongside video-chat features.)	Arduc	Arduc	2005-04-28^{JP}	Yes		
CMT Presents: Karaoke Revolution Country	Harmonix	Konami	2006-03-21^{NA}			Yes
Cocoto Fishing Master	Neko Entertainment	Big Ben Interactive^{EU}, Conspiracy Entertainment^{NA}	2007-12-07^{NA}		Yes	Yes
Cocoto Funfair	Neko Entertainment	Big Ben Interactive	2006^{EU}		Yes	
Cocoto Kart Racer	Neko Entertainment	Big Ben Interactive	2005-03-02^{EU}		Yes	
Cocoto Platform Jumper	Neko Entertainment	Big Ben Interactive	2004-07-02^{PAL}		Yes	
Code Age Commanders	Square Enix	Square Enix	2005-10-13^{AS, JP}	Yes ^{AS, JP}		
Code Geass: Lelouch of the Rebellion: Lost Colors •Code Geass: Hangyaku no Lelouch – Lost Colors^{JP}	Crafts & Meister	Bandai Namco	2008-03-27^{JP}	Yes		
Code Lyoko: Quest for Infinity	Neko Entertainment	The Game Factory	2008-07-21^{NA}		Yes	Yes
Code of the Samurai •Shinsengumi Gunrou-den^{JP}	Red Entertainment	Sega^{JP}, Midas Interactive Entertainment^{EU}	2005-02-10^{JP}	Yes	Yes	
Codename: Kids Next Door – Operation: V.I.D.E.O.G.A.M.E.	High Voltage Software	Global Star Software	2005-10-11^{NA}		Yes	Yes
Cold Fear	Darkworks	Ubisoft	2005-03-04^{EU}		Yes	Yes
Cold Winter	Swordfish Studios	Vivendi Universal Games	2005-05-11^{NA}		Yes	Yes
Colin McRae Rally 04	Codemasters	Codemasters	2003-09-19^{PAL}		Yes	
Colin McRae Rally 2005	Codemasters	Codemasters	2004-09-24^{EU}		Yes	
Colin McRae Rally 3	Codemasters	Codemasters	2002-10-25^{EU}		Yes	Yes
College Hoops 2K6	Visual Concepts	2K Sports	2005-11-30^{NA}			Yes
College Hoops 2K7	Visual Concepts	2K Sports	2006-12-11^{NA}			Yes
College Hoops 2K8	Visual Concepts	2K Sports	2007-11-19^{NA}			Yes
Coloball 2002	Vanpool	Enterbrain	2002-06-27^{JP}	Yes		
Colorful Aquarium: My Little Mermaid	Eufonie	NIne'sFox	2007-10-25^{JP}	Yes		
Colorful Box: To Love	Sound Tail	KID	2004-05-27^{JP}	Yes		
Colosseum: Road to Freedom •Gladiator: Road to Freedom^{JP}	Ertain	KOEI	2005-02-17^{JP}	Yes	Yes	Yes
Combat Ace	Phoenix Games	Phoenix Games	2006-10-13^{EU}		Yes	
Combat Elite: WWII Paratroopers	BattleBorne Entertainment	SouthPeak Games	2005-11-21^{NA}			Yes
Combat Queen	General Entertainment	Taito	2002-08-01^{JP}	Yes		
Commandos 2: Men of Courage	Pyro Studios	Eidos Interactive	2002-08-28^{NA}		Yes	Yes
Commandos: Strike Force	Pyro Studios	Eidos Interactive^{EU, NA}, Spike^{JP}	2006-03-17^{EU}	Yes	Yes	Yes
Conan	Cauldron	TDK Mediactive	2004-05-07^{EU}		Yes	
Conflict: Desert Storm •Conflict Delta: Wangan Sensou 1991^{JP}	Pivotal Games	SCi^{EU}, Gotham Games^{NA}, Capcom^{JP}	2002-09-13^{EU}	Yes	Yes	Yes
Conflict: Desert Storm II: Back to Baghdad •Conflict Delta II: Wangan Sensou 1991^{JP}	Pivotal Games	SCi^{EU}, Gotham Games^{NA}, Capcom^{JP}	2003-09-19^{EU}	Yes	Yes	Yes
Conflict: Global Terror •Conflict: Global Storm^{EU}	Pivotal Games	SCi^{EU}, 2K Games^{NA}	2005-09-30^{EU}		Yes	Yes
Conflict: Vietnam	Pivotal Games	SCi^{EU}, Global Star Software^{NA}	2004-09-03^{EU}		Yes	Yes
Conflict Zone	MASA Group	Ubisoft	2002-08-16^{EU}		Yes	Yes
Conspiracy: Weapons of Mass Destruction	Kuju Entertainment	Oxygen Games	2005-06-17^{EU}		Yes	
Constantine	Bits Studios	THQ^{NA}, SCi^{EU}, Marvelous Entertainment^{JP}	2005-02-14^{NA}	Yes	Yes	Yes
Contra: Shattered Soldier •Shin Contra^{JP, KO}	Konami	Konami	2002-10-22^{NA}	Yes ^{JP, KO}	Yes	Yes
The Conveni 3	Hamster Corporation	Hamster Corporation	2003-04-24^{JP}	Yes		
The Conveni 4	Hamster Corporation	Hamster Corporation	2006-04-27^{JP}	Yes		
Cool Boarders 2001	Idol Minds	Sony Computer Entertainment	2001-05-21^{NA}			Yes
Cool Boarders: Code Alien	UEP Systems	UEP Systems	2000-12-21^{JP}	Yes		
Cool Shot	DigiCube	DigiCube^{JP}, Phoenix Games^{EU}	2003-01-23^{JP}	Yes	Yes	
Coraline	Papaya Studio	D3 Publisher	2009-01-27^{NA}		Yes	Yes
Corvette	Steel Monkeys	Global Star Software^{NA}, TDK Mediactive^{EU}	2004-03-09^{NA}		Yes	Yes
Corvette Evolution GT •Evolution GT^{PAL}	Milestone srl	Valcon Games^{NA}, Black Bean Games^{PAL}	2006-10-11^{NA}		Yes	Yes
Counter Terrorist Special Forces: Fire for Effect •Counter Terrorist Special Forces: Tero-Taisaku Tokushubutai: Nemesis no Shuurai^{JP}	Asobo Studio	LSP^{EU}, Titus Software^{JP}	2005-04-01^{EU}	Yes	Yes	
Countryside Bears	Phoenix Games	Phoenix Games	2006^{EU}		Yes	
Covert Command •Simple 2000 Series Vol. 102: The Fuhyou: Senjou no Inu Tachi^{JP}	Tamsoft	D3 Publisher^{JP}, Essential Games^{EU}	2006-08-03^{JP}	Yes	Yes	
Cowboy Bebop: Tsuioku no Serenade	Bandai	Bandai	2005-08-25^{JP}	Yes		
Crabby Adventure	Phoenix Games	Phoenix Games	2007-12-01^{EU}		Yes	
Crash Bandicoot: The Wrath of Cortex •Crash Bandicoot 4: Sakuretsu! Majin Power^{JP}	Traveller's Tales	Universal Interactive^{EU, NA}, Konami^{JP}	2001-11-01^{NA}	Yes	Yes	Yes
Crash: Mind over Mutant	Radical Entertainment	Activision^{NA}, Vivendi Games^{PAL}	2008-10-07^{NA}		Yes	Yes
Crash 'N' Burn	Climax Studios	Eidos Interactive	2004-11-15^{NA}		Yes	Yes
Crash Nitro Kart •Crash Bandicoot Bakusou! Nitro Kart^{JP}	Vicarious Visions	Universal Interactive^{NA, PAL}, Konami^{JP}	2003-11-11^{NA}	Yes	Yes	Yes
Crash of the Titans	Radical Entertainment	Vivendi Games	2007-10-04^{NA}		Yes	Yes
Crash Tag Team Racing •Crash Bandicoot: Gacchanko World^{JP}	Radical Entertainment	Vivendi Universal Games	2005-10-19^{NA}	Yes	Yes	Yes
Crash Twinsanity •Crash Bandicoot 5: Crash & Cortex no Yabou?!?^{JP}	Traveller's Tales	Vivendi Universal Games	2004-09-28^{NA}	Yes	Yes	Yes
Crashed	Rage Software	Rage Software	2002-09-27^{EU}		Yes	
Crazy Chicken X •Moorhuhn X^{EU}	Sproing Interactive	Focus Multimedia	2006-11-17^{EU}		Yes	
Crazy Frog Arcade Racer •Crazy Frog Racer 2^{EU}	Neko Entertainment	Digital Jesters^{EU}, Valcon Games^{NA, JP}	2006-12-01^{EU}	Yes	Yes	Yes
Crazy Frog Racer	Neko Entertainment	Digital Jesters	2005-12-09^{EU}		Yes	
Crazy Golf	Phoenix Games	Phoenix Games	2005-02-25^{EU}		Yes	
Crazy Golf World Tour	Liquid Games	Liquid Games	2005-07-22^{EU}		Yes	
Crazy Taxi	Acclaim Studios Cheltenham	Acclaim Entertainment^{EU, NA}, Sega^{JP}	2001-05-14^{NA}	Yes	Yes	Yes
Crescent Suzuki Racing: Superbikes and Super Sidecars	Kuju Entertainment	Midas Interactive Entertainment	2004-04-08^{EU}		Yes	
Cricket 07	EA Sports	EA Sports	2006-11-16^{AU}		Yes	
Cricket 2002	EA Sports	EA Sports	2002-02-01^{EU}		Yes	
Cricket 2004	HB Studios Multimedia	EA Sports	2004-03-05^{EU}		Yes	
Cricket 2005	HB Studios Multimedia	EA Sports	2005-07-01^{EU}		Yes	
Crime Life: Gang Wars	Hothouse Creations	Konami	2005-09-01^{EU}		Yes	
Crimson Empire: Circumstances to Serve a Noble	QuinRose	QuinRose	2010-12-16^{JP}	Yes		
Crimson Sea 2 •Kurenai no Umi 2^{JP}	Koei	Koei	2004-03-30^{NA}	Yes ^{JP, KO}	Yes	Yes
Crimson Tears	Spike, DreamFactory	Capcom	2004-04-22^{JP}	Yes	Yes	Yes
Critical Bullet: 7th Target	Flagship	Capcom	2002-10-24^{JP}	Yes		
Critical Velocity	Namco	Namco	2005-10-13^{JP}	Yes		
Cross Channel: To All People	FlyingShine	KID	2004-03-18^{JP}	Yes		
Crossword •SuperLite 2000: Puzzle^{JP}	Success Corporation	Success Corporation	2004-01-22^{JP}	Yes		
Crouching Tiger, Hidden Dragon	Genki	Ubisoft^{EU, NA}, ESP Software^{JP}	2003-10-09^{NA}	Yes	Yes	Yes
Crusty Demons	Climax Studios	Deep Silver	2006-11-24^{EU}		Yes	
CSI: 3 Dimensions of Murder	Telltale Games	Ubisoft	2007-09-25^{NA}		Yes	Yes
Cubic Lode Runner •Hudson Selection Vol. 1: Cubic Lode Runner^{JP}	Hudson Soft	Hudson Soft	2003-11-27^{JP}	Yes		
Cubix: Robots for Everyone: Showdown	Blitz Games	3DO	2003-06-02^{NA}			Yes
Cue Academy: Snooker, Pool, Billiards	Midas Interactive Entertainment	Midas Interactive Entertainment	2006-09-01^{EU}		Yes	
Culdcept •Culdcept II Expansion^{JP, KO}	Omiya Soft	Sega^{JP}, AK Communications^{KO}, NEC Interchannel^{NA}	2002-09-26^{JP}	Yes ^{JP, KO}		Yes
Curious George	Monkey Bar Games	Namco	2006-02-01^{NA}	Yes ^{AS}	Yes	Yes
Curry House CoCo Ichibanya	Dorart	Dorart	2004-05-20^{JP}	Yes		
Curse: The Eye of Isis	Asylum Entertainment	Wanadoo Edition	2004-02-27^{EU}		Yes	
Cy Girls •Cool Girl^{JP}	Konami	Konami	2004-02-19^{JP}	Yes	Yes	Yes
Cyber Jansou	Konami	Konami	2002-03-28^{JP}	Yes		
Cyber Troopers Virtual-On Marz •Dennou Senki Virtual-On: Marz^{JP}	Hitmaker	Sega	2003-05-29^{JP}	Yes		Yes
Cyclone Circus	Playlogic Entertainment	Playlogic Entertainment	2006-02-01^{EU}		Yes	
D 🡒 A: Black	Tonkin House	Tonkin House	2003-12-25^{JP}	Yes		
D 🡒 A: White	Tonkin House	Tonkin House	2004-12-02^{JP}	Yes		
D. C. F. S. ~Da Capo Four Seasons~ (Note: stand-alone expansion for D.C.P.S. Da Capo Plus Situation.)	Kadokawa Games	Kadokawa Games	2005-12-15^{JP}	Yes		
D1 Professional Drift Grand Prix Series	Yuke's	Yuke's	2005-02-17^{JP}	Yes		Yes
D1 Professional Drift Grand Prix Series 2005	Yuke's	Yuke's	2005-10-20^{JP}	Yes		
The Da Vinci Code	The Collective	2K Games	2006-05-15^{NA}		Yes	Yes
Daemon Summoner	Atomic Planet Entertainment	Midas Interactive Entertainment	2006-03-31^{EU}		Yes	
Dai Guruguru Onsen	Sega	Sega	2002-10-31^{JP}	Yes		
Daisan Teikoku Koubouki	Global A	Global A	2004-01-15^{JP}	Yes		
Daisan Teikoku Koubouki II	Global A	Marionette	2005-09-01^{JP}	Yes		
Daisenryaku 1941	SystemSoft Alpha	Sammy	2002-09-26^{JP}	Yes		
Daisenryaku: Dai Toua Kouboushi - Tora Tora Tora Ware Kishuu Ni Seikou Seri	SystemSoft Alpha	SystemSoft Alpha	2008-09-25^{JP}	Yes		
Daisenryaku VII: Exceed	SystemSoft Alpha	SystemSoft Alpha^{JP}, Valcon Games^{NA}	2006-12-14^{JP}	Yes		Yes
Daito Giken Koushiki Pachi-Slot Simulator: 24 – Twenty-Four	Paon DP	Paon DP	2008-10-09^{JP}	Yes		
Daito Giken Koushiki Pachi-Slot Simulator: Hihouden	Daito	Daito	2006-08-17^{JP}	Yes		
Daito Giken Koushiki Pachi-Slot Simulator: Ossu! Banchou	Paon DP	Daito	2005-11-02^{JP}	Yes		
Daito Giken Koushiki Pachi-Slot Simulator: Shake II	Paon DP	Paon DP	2007-07-26^{JP}	Yes		
Daito Giken Koushiki Pachi-Slot Simulator: Shin Yoshimune	Paon DP	Paon DP	2008-03-13^{JP}	Yes		
Daito Giken Koushiki Pachi-Slot Simulator: Yoshimune	Daito	Daito	2004-12-09^{JP}	Yes		
Daito Giken Premium Pachi-Slot Collection: Yoshimune	Paon DP	Daito	2006-07-06^{JP}	Yes		
Dakar 2	Acclaim Studios Cheltenham	Acclaim Entertainment	2003-03-07^{EU}		Yes	
Dalmatians 3	The Code Monkeys	Phoenix Games	2006^{EU}		Yes	
Dance Dance Revolution: Disney Channel Edition	Keen Games	Konami Digital Entertainment	2008-01-08^{NA}			Yes
Dance Dance Revolution Extreme •DDR Festival Dance Dance Revolution^{JP}	Konami	Konami	2004-04-21^{NA}	Yes		Yes
Dance Dance Revolution Extreme 2	Konami Digital Entertainment	Konami Digital Entertainment	2005-09-27^{NA}			Yes
Dance Dance Revolution Extreme (Japan)	Konami	Konami	2003-10-09^{JP}	Yes		
Dance Dance Revolution Party Collection	Konami Computer Entertainment Japan	Konami	2003-12-11^{JP}	Yes		
Dance Dance Revolution Strike	Konami Digital Entertainment	Konami Digital Entertainment	2006-02-16^{JP}	Yes		
Dance Dance Revolution SuperNova •Dancing Stage: SuperNova^{PAL}	Konami Digital Entertainment	Konami Digital Entertainment	2006-09-26^{NA}	Yes	Yes	Yes
Dance Dance Revolution SuperNova 2 •Dancing Stage: SuperNova 2^{EU}	Konami Digital Entertainment	Konami Digital Entertainment	2007-09-25^{NA}	Yes	Yes	Yes
Dance Dance Revolution X	Konami Digital Entertainment	Konami Digital Entertainment	2008-09-12^{NA}	Yes		Yes
Dance Dance Revolution X2	Konami Digital Entertainment	Konami Digital Entertainment	2009-10-27^{NA}			Yes
Dance Factory	Broadsword Interactive	Codemasters	2006-08-29^{NA}		Yes	Yes
Dance Fest	Broadsword Interactive	Oxygen Games	2006-10-20^{EU}		Yes	
Dance Party: Club Hits	Broadsword Interactive	Nordic Games Publishing	2009-05-08^{EU}		Yes	
Dance Party: Pop Hits	Broadsword Interactive	Nordic Games Publishing	2009-05-08^{EU}		Yes	
Dance Summit 2001: Bust A Move	Metro	Enix	2000-11-02^{JP}	Yes		
Dance: UK	Broadsword Interactive	BigBen Interactive	2003-10-03^{EU}		Yes	
Dance: UK eXtra Trax	Broadsword Interactive	BigBen Interactive	2004-04-23^{EU}		Yes	
Dance: UK XL Party	Broadsword Interactive	BigBen Interactive	2005-09-30^{EU}		Yes	
Dancing Stage Fever	Konami Digital Entertainment	Konami Digital Entertainment	2003-10-24^{EU}		Yes	
Dancing Stage Fusion	Konami Digital Entertainment	Konami Digital Entertainment	2004-11-05^{EU}		Yes	
Dancing Stage Max	Konami Digital Entertainment	Konami Digital Entertainment	2005-11-25^{EU}		Yes	
Dancing With The Stars	Zoë Mode	Activision	2007-10-23^{NA}			Yes
Dark Angel: Vampire Apocalypse	Metro 3D	Metro 3D	2001-07-08^{NA}	Yes ^{KO}		Yes
Dark Cloud	Level-5	Sony Computer Entertainment	2000-12-14^{JP}	Yes	Yes	Yes
Dark Cloud 2 •Dark Chronicle^{EU, JP}	Level-5	Sony Computer Entertainment	2002-11-28^{JP}	Yes	Yes	Yes
Dark Summit	Radical Entertainment	THQ	2001-11-26^{NA}		Yes	Yes
Dark Wind	Atomic Planet Entertainment	In2Games	2004-10-22^{EU}		Yes	
Darkwatch	High Moon Studios	Capcom^{NA}, Ubisoft^{EU}	2005-08-16^{NA}		Yes	Yes
Darling Special Backlash: Koi no Exhaust Heat •Simple 2000 Series Vol. 97: The Koi no Engine^{JP}	NEST	D3 Publisher	2004-08-05^{JP}	Yes		
Dave Mirra Freestyle BMX 2	Z-Axis	Acclaim Max Sports	2001-08-27^{NA}		Yes	Yes
David Beckham Soccer	Rage Software Limited	Rage Software Limited	2002-06-07^{EU}		Yes	
David Douillet Judo	10tacle Studios	Bigben Interactive	2006-10-02^{EU}		Yes	
Dawn of Mana •Seiken Densetsu 4^{JP, KO}	Square-Enix	Square-Enix	2006-12-21^{JP}	Yes ^{JP, KO}		Yes
D.C.: Da Capo	Circus	Kadokawa Games	2008-02-14^{JP}	Yes		
D.C. II P.S.: Da Capo II Plus Situation	Circus	Kadokawa Games	2008-05-29^{JP}	Yes		
D.C.I.F.: Da Capo Innocent Finale (Note: stand-alone expansion for D.C.P.S. Da Capo Plus Situation.)	Circus	Circus	2009-04-29^{JP}	Yes		
D.C.P.S. Da Capo Plus Situation	ESP Software	ESP Software	2003-10-30^{JP}	Yes		
DDRMAX Dance Dance Revolution •Dancing Stage MegaMix^{EU}	Konami of America	Konami of America	2002-10-28^{NA}		Yes	Yes
DDRMAX Dance Dance Revolution 6thMix	Konami Computer Entertainment Tokyo	Konami	2002-05-16^{JP}	Yes		
DDRMAX2 Dance Dance Revolution	Konami Digital Entertainment	Konami Digital Entertainment	2003-09-23^{NA}			Yes
DDRMAX2 Dance Dance Revolution 7thMix	Konami Computer Entertainment Japan	Konami	2003-04-24^{JP}	Yes		
De Grote Nederlandse Voetbalquiz	Liquid Games	Liquid Games	2006-06-06^{EU}		Yes	
Dead Eye Jim	Phoenix Games	Phoenix Games	2007-01-12^{EU}		Yes	
Dead or Alive 2	Team Ninja	Tecmo	2000-03-30	Yes	Yes	
Dead or Alive 2: Hardcore (Note: update for Dead or Alive 2.)	Team Ninja	Tecmo^{NA}, Sony Computer Entertainment^{EU}	2000-10-25	Yes		Yes
Dead To Rights	Namco Hometek	Namco^{JP}, Namco Hometek^{NA}, Electronic Arts^{PAL}	2002-11-18^{NA}	Yes	Yes	Yes
Dead To Rights II	WideScreen Games	Namco Hometek^{NA}, Electronic Arts^{PAL}	2005-04-12^{NA}		Yes	Yes
Deadly Strike •Simple 2000 Ultimate Series Vol. 16: Sengoku vs. Gendai^{JP}	Psyworks Co. Ltd.	D3Publisher^{JP}, Midas Interactive Entertainment^{PAL}	2004-02-19^{JP}	Yes	Yes	
Dear Boys: Fast Break!	KCEJ	Konami	2003-09-18^{JP}	Yes		
Dear My Friend: Love Like Powdery Snow	Yeti	Yeti	2005-04-28^{JP}	Yes		
Dear My Sun!! Musk * Ikusei * Capriccio	HuneX	D3 Publisher	2007-09-06^{JP}	Yes		
DearS	MediaWorks	MediaWorks	2004-06-24^{JP}	Yes		
Death by Degrees	Namco	Namco^{AS, JP, NA}, Sony Computer Entertainment^{KO, PAL}	2005-01-27^{JP}	Yes ^{AS, JP, KO}	Yes	Yes
Death Connection	Otomate	Idea Factory	2009-12-17^{JP}	Yes		
Deep Water •Simple 2000 Series Vol. 54: The Daikaijuu^{JP}	Tamsoft	D3 Publisher^{JP}, 505 Game Street^{EU}	2004-06-24^{JP}	Yes	Yes	
Deer Hunter	Coresoft	Atari	2003-12-22^{NA}			Yes
Def Jam: Fight for NY	Aki Corporation	EA Games	2004-09-20^{NA}	Yes	Yes	Yes
Def Jam Vendetta	Aki Corporation	EA Sports BIG	2003-03-31^{NA}	Yes	Yes	Yes
Defender	7 Studios	Midway Games	2002-10-22^{NA}		Yes	Yes
Deka Voice	Acquire	Sony Computer Entertainment	2003-02-13^{JP}	Yes		
Delta Force: Black Hawk Down	Rebellion Developments	NovaLogic	2005-07-26^{NA}		Yes	Yes
Delta Force: Black Hawk Down: Team Sabre (Note: stand-alone expansion for Delta Force: Black Hawk Down.)	Rebellion Developments	NovaLogic	2006-11-10^{EU}		Yes	Yes
Demolition Girl •Simple 2000 Series Vol. 50: The Daibijin^{JP}	Tamsoft	D3 Publisher^{JP}, 505 Game Street^{PAL}	2004-05-20^{JP}	Yes	Yes	
Demon Chaos •Ikusa Gami^{AS, JP}	Genki	Genki^{AS, JP}, Konami^{PAL}	2005-11-22^{AS}	Yes ^{AS, JP}	Yes	
Densha de Go! 3 Tsuukinhen •Simple 2000 Series Vol. 22: The Tsuukin Densha Utenshi – Densha de Go! 3 Tsuukinhen^{JP}	Taito	Taito, D3 Publisher	2001-03-15^{JP}	Yes		
Densha de Go! Final	Taito	Taito	2004-05-27^{JP}	Yes		
Densha de Go! Professional 2	Taito	Taito	2003-02-27^{JP}	Yes		
Densha de Go! Ryojouhen	Taito	Taito	2002-07-25^{JP}	Yes		
Densha de Go! Shinkansen: Sanyou Shinkansen-hen	Taito	Taito	2001-09-20^{JP}	Yes		
Derby Stallion 04	ParityBit	Enterbrain	2004-04-22^{JP}	Yes		
Derby Tsuku 3: Derby Uma o Tsukurō!	Smilebit	Sega	2003-12-11^{JP}	Yes		
Derby Tsuku 4: Derby Uma o Tsukurō!	Smilebit	Sega	2004-12-02^{JP}	Yes		
Derby Uma o Tsukurō! 5	Land Ho!	Sega	2006-01-19^{JP}	Yes		
Desert Kingdom	Design Factory	Idea Factory	2010-05-27^{JP}	Yes ^{JP}		
Desi Adda: Games of India	Gameshastra	Sony Computer Entertainment	2009-10-27^{IN}		Yes ^{IN}	
Desire	Interchannel	Interchannel	2004-09-30^{JP}	Yes		
Despicable Me: The Game •Despicable Me^{PAL}	Monkey Bar Games	D3 Publisher	2010-07-06^{NA}		Yes	Yes
Dessert Love: Sweet Plus	TiramisuVilla	Marvelous Entertainment	2006-02-23^{JP}	Yes		
Destroy All Humans!	Pandemic Studios	THQ^{EU, NA}, Sega^{JP}	2005-06-21^{NA}	Yes	Yes	Yes
Destroy All Humans! 2	Pandemic Studios	THQ	2006-10-17^{NA}		Yes	Yes
Destruction Derby Arenas	Studio 33	Sony Computer Entertainment^{EU}, Gathering of Developers^{NA}	2004-01-09^{EU}		Yes	Yes
Detonator •Buile Baku^{JP}	KAZe	Kadokawa Games^{JP}, Midas Interactive Entertainment^{EU}	2002-03-20^{JP}	Yes	Yes	
Deus Ex: The Conspiracy •Deus Ex^{EU}	Ion Storm	Eidos Interactive	2002-03-26^{NA}		Yes	Yes
Devil Kings •Sengoku Basara^{JP}	Capcom	Capcom	2005-07-21^{JP}	Yes	Yes	Yes
Devil May Cry	Capcom	Capcom	2001-08-23^{JP}	Yes ^{JP, KO}	Yes	Yes
Devil May Cry 2	Capcom	Capcom	2003-01-25^{NA}	Yes ^{AS, JP, KO}	Yes	Yes
Devil May Cry 3: Dante's Awakening •Devil May Cry 3: Dante's Awakening Special Edition (different version)	Capcom	Capcom	2005-02-17^{JP, KO}	Yes ^{JP, KO}	Yes	Yes
D.Gray-man: Sousha no Shikaku	Konami	Konami	2008-09-11^{JP}	Yes		
Di Gi Charat Fantasy Excellent	M2	Broccoli	2003-11-20^{JP}	Yes		
Diabolik: The Original Sin	Artematica	Black Bean Games	2009-06-26^{PAL}		Yes	
DICE: DNA Integrated Cybernetic Enterprises	Natsume Co., Ltd.	Bandai	2005-09-22^{NA}			Yes
Die Hard: Vendetta	Bits Studios	NDA Productions	2003-06-27^{EU}		Yes	
Diet Channel	Konami	Konami	2004-03-04^{JP}	Yes		
Digimon Rumble Arena 2 •Digimon Battle Chronicle^{JP}	Black Ship Games	Bandai	2004-07-29^{JP}	Yes	Yes	Yes
Digimon World 4 •Digimon World X^{JP}	Bandai	Bandai	2005-01-06^{JP}	Yes	Yes	Yes
Digimon World Data Squad •Digimon Savers: Another Mission^{JP}	BEC	Bandai	2006-11-30^{JP}	Yes		Yes
Digital Holmes	Arc System Works	Arc System Works^{JP}, YBM Sisa^{KO}	2003-05-30^{JP}	Yes ^{JP, KO}		
Dino Stalker •Gun Survivor 3: Dino Crisis^{JP, KO}	Capcom	Capcom	2002-06-27^{JP}	Yes ^{JP, KO}	Yes	Yes
Dinosaur Adventure	Phoenix Games	Phoenix Games	2006^{EU}		Yes	
Dirge of Cerberus: Final Fantasy VII	Square Enix	Square Enix	2006-01-26^{JP}	Yes	Yes	Yes
Dirt Track Devils •Simple 2000 Series Vol. 11: The Offroad Buggy^{JP}	Vingt-et-un Systems	D3 Publisher^{JP}, Midas Interactive Entertainment^{EU}	2002-10-10^{JP}	Yes	Yes	
Disaster Report •Zettaizetsumei Toshi^{JP} •SOS: The Final Escape^{PAL}	Irem	Irem^{JP}, Agetec^{PAL, NA}	2002-04-25^{JP}	Yes	Yes	Yes
Disgaea 2: Cursed Memories •Makai Senki Disgaea 2^{JP}	Nippon Ichi Software	Nippon Ichi Software^{JP}, NIS America^{NA}, Koei^{PAL}	2006-02-23^{JP}	Yes	Yes	Yes
Disgaea: Hour of Darkness •Makai Senki Disgaea^{JP}	Nippon Ichi Software	Nippon Ichi Software^{JP}, Atlus^{NA}, Koei^{PAL}	2003-01-30^{JP}	Yes	Yes	Yes
Disney Golf •Disney Golf Classic^{JP}	T&E Soft	Capcom^{JP}, Electronic Arts^{NA}, Disney Interactive^{PAL}	2002-05-30^{JP}	Yes	Yes	Yes
Disney Hannah Montana: Spotlight World Tour	Avalanche Studios	Disney Interactive Studios	2008-08-07^{NA}		Yes	Yes
Disney Move	Behaviour Interactive	Buena Vista Games	2004-11-19^{EU}		Yes	
Disney Presents Piglet's Big Game •Disney's Piglet's Big Game^{EU}	Doki Denki Studio	Gotham Games	2003-03-19^{NA}		Yes	Yes
Disney Princess: Enchanted Journey •Disney Princess: Mahou no Sekai e^{JP}	Papaya Studio	Disney Interactive Studios	2007-10-16^{NA}	Yes	Yes	Yes
Disney Sing It	Zoe Mode	Disney Interactive Studios	2008-10-21^{NA}		Yes	Yes
Disney Sing It! – High School Musical 3: Senior Year	Disney Interactive Studios	Disney Interactive Studios	2008-11-28^{EU}		Yes	Yes
Disney Sing It: Pop Hits	Disney Interactive Studios	Disney Interactive Studios	2009-10-06^{NA}		Yes	Yes
Disney Think Fast	Magenta Software	Disney Interactive Studios	2008-11-07^{NA}		Yes	Yes
Disney/Pixar Finding Nemo	Traveller's Tales	THQ^{EU, NA}, Yuke's^{JP}	2003-05-12^{NA}	Yes	Yes	Yes
Disney/Pixar Ratatouille •Disney/Pixar Remy no Oishii Restaurant^{JP}	Asobo Studio	THQ^{EU, NA}, Yuke's^{JP}	2007-06-26^{NA}	Yes ^{JP, KO}	Yes	Yes
Disney/Pixar Toy Story 3	Asobo Studio	Disney Interactive Studios	2010-10-21^{EU}		Yes	Yes
Disney's Chicken Little •Chicken Little^{JP, KO, PAL}	Avalanche Software	Buena Vista Games^{NA, PAL}, D3 Publisher^{JP}, THQ^{KO}	2005-10-20^{NA}	Yes ^{JP, KO}	Yes	Yes
Disney's Chicken Little: Ace in Action	Avalanche Software	Buena Vista Games	2006-11-09^{NA}		Yes	Yes
Disney's Dinosaur	Ubi Soft Paris	Ubi Soft	2000-12-08^{PAL}	Yes	Yes	
Disney's Donald Duck: Goin' Quackers •Donald Duck: Quack Attack^{EU} •Donald Duck: Rescue Daisakusen!!^{JP}	Ubi Soft Montreal	Ubi Soft	2000-12-13^{NA}	Yes	Yes	Yes
Disney's Extreme Skate Adventure	Toys for Bob	Activision	2003-09-02^{NA}		Yes	Yes
Disney's Kim Possible: What's the Switch?	Artificial Mind and Movement	Buena Vista Games	2006-10-19^{NA}		Yes	Yes
Disney's Meet the Robinsons	Avalanche Software	Buena Vista Games	2007-03-27^{NA}		Yes	Yes
Disney's PK: Out of the Shadows •Disney's Donald Duck: PK^{EU}	Ubi Soft Casablanca	Ubi Soft	2002-10-04^{EU}		Yes	Yes
Disney's Stitch: Experiment 626 •Lilo and Stitch: Stitch no Daibouken^{JP}	High Voltage Software	Sony Computer Entertainment, Electronic Arts^{JP}	2002-06-19^{NA}	Yes	Yes	Yes
Disney's Tarzan: Untamed •Disney's Tarzan: Freeride^{EU, JP}	Ubi Soft Montreal	Ubi Soft	2001-11-14^{NA}	Yes	Yes	Yes
Disney's Treasure Planet	Bizarre Creations	Sony Computer Entertainment	2002-11-11^{NA}		Yes	Yes
Disney's Winnie The Pooh's Rumbly Tumbly Adventure	Phoenix Studio	Ubisoft	2005-02-08^{NA}		Yes	Yes
DJ Hero	FreeStyleGames	Activision Blizzard	2009-10-27^{NA}		Yes	Yes
D.N.A.: Dark Native Apostle	Hudson Soft	Hudson Soft	2001-09-06^{JP}	Yes	Yes	
D.N.Angel: Kurenai no Tsubasa	Takara	Takara	2003-09-25^{JP}	Yes		
DodgeBall •Simple 2000 Series Vol. 49: The Dodge Ball^{JP}	Access	D3 Publisher^{JP}, 505 Game Street^{EU}	2004-04-22^{JP}	Yes	Yes	
DoDonPachi Dai-Ou-Jou	Arika	Arika	2003-04-10^{JP}	Yes		
The Dog Island •The Dog Island: Hitotsuno no Hana no Monogatari^{JP}	Yuke's	Yuke's^{JP}, Ubisoft^{NA, PAL}	2007-04-26^{JP}	Yes	Yes	Yes
Dog of Bay	Marvelous Entertainment	Marvelous Entertainment	2000-12-14^{JP}	Yes		
Dog's Life	Frontier Developments	Sony Computer Entertainment^{PAL}, Hip Games^{NA}, Success^{JP}	2003-10-31^{PAL}	Yes	Yes	Yes
DogStation	Konami	Konami	2003-02-06^{JP}	Yes		
Dokapon DX: Wataru Sekai wa Oni Darake	Asmik Ace Entertainment	Asmik Ace Entertainment	2004-07-08^{JP}	Yes		
Dokapon Kingdom	Sting	Sting^{JP}, Atlus^{NA}	2007-11-22^{JP}	Yes		Yes
Dokapon the World	Asmik Ace Entertainment	Asmik Ace Entertainment	2004-11-03^{JP}	Yes		
Doko Demo Issho: Toro to Ippai	Sony Computer Entertainment	Sony Computer Entertainment	2004-09-02^{JP}	Yes		
Doko Demo Issho: Toro to Nagare Boshi	Sony Computer Entertainment	Sony Computer Entertainment	2004-04-01^{JP}	Yes		
Doko e Iku no, Anohi	PrincessSoft	PrincessSoft	2005-02-24^{JP}	Yes		
Don 2: The Game	Gameshastra	Gameshastra	2013-02-15^{IN}		Yes ^{IN}	
Donkey Xote	Revistronic	Virgin Play	2008-11-14^{EU}		Yes	
Doomsday Racers	Phoenix Games	Phoenix Games	2005-07-15^{EU}		Yes	
Dora the Explorer: Dora Saves the Crystal Kingdom	Take-Two Interactive	2K Play	2009-11-09^{NA}			Yes
Dora the Explorer: Dora Saves the Mermaids	2KPlay	Totally Games	2008-02-11^{NA}		Yes	Yes
Dora the Explorer: Dora Saves the Snow Princess	High Voltage Software	2KPlay	2008-10-27^{NA}		Yes	Yes
Dora the Explorer: Journey to the Purple Planet	Take-Two Interactive	Global Star Software	2005-12-02^{EU}		Yes	Yes
Dora's Big Birthday Adventure	2KPlay	Take-Two Interactive	2010-11-02^{NA}			Yes
The Double Mahjong Puzzle •Simple 2000 Series Vol. 4: The Double Mahjong Puzzle^{JP}	Metro Corporation	D3 Publisher	2002-04-25^{JP}	Yes		
Double Reaction! Plus	Daisy Chain	Datam Polystar	2004-09-22^{JP}	Yes		
Downforce	Smart Dog	Titus Software^{NA}, MTO^{JP}	2002-06-14^{NA}	Yes	Yes	Yes
Downhill Domination •MT Bikers: Bakusou Mountain Bikers^{JP}	Incognito Entertainment	Sony Computer Entertainment^{JP, NA}, Codemasters^{EU}	2003-07-23^{NA}	Yes	Yes	Yes
Downhill Slalom	Phoenix Games	Phoenix Games	2006-10-06^{EU}		Yes	
Downtown Run	Ubisoft	Ubisoft	2003-03-28^{EU}		Yes	
Dr. Dolittle	Aqua Pacific	Blast! Entertainment Ltd	2006-11-29^{EU}		Yes	
Dr. Muto	Midway Games	Midway Games	2002-11-19^{NA}		Yes	Yes
Dr. Seuss' The Cat in the Hat •The Cat in the Hat^{EU}	Magenta Software	Vivendi Universal Games	2003-11-05^{NA}		Yes	Yes
Drag Racer USA	Phoenix Games	Phoenix Games	2006-10-27^{EU}		Yes	
Dragon Ball Z: Budokai •Dragon Ball Z^{JP}	Dimps	Bandai^{EU, JP}, Infogrames^{AU, NA}	2002-11-29^{EU}	Yes	Yes	Yes
Dragon Ball Z: Budokai 2 •Dragon Ball Z 2^{JP} •Dragon Ball Z 2V^{JP} (different version)	Dimps	Bandai^{EU, JP}, Atari^{AU, NA}	2003-11-14^{EU}	Yes	Yes	Yes
Dragon Ball Z: Budokai 3 •Dragon Ball Z 3^{JP}	Dimps	Bandai^{EU, JP}, Atari^{AU, NA}	2004-11-16^{NA}	Yes	Yes	Yes
Dragon Ball Z: Budokai Tenkaichi •Dragon Ball Z Sparking!^{JP, KO}	Spike	Bandai^{EU, JP, KO}, Atari^{AU, NA}	2005-10-06^{JP}	Yes ^{JP, KO}	Yes	Yes
Dragon Ball Z: Budokai Tenkaichi 2 •Dragon Ball Z Sparking! NEO^{JP, KO}	Spike	Bandai^{EU, JP, KO}, Atari^{AU, NA}	2006-10-05^{JP}	Yes ^{JP, KO}	Yes	Yes
Dragon Ball Z: Budokai Tenkaichi 3 •Dragon Ball Z Sparking! Meteor^{JP, KO}	Spike	Bandai^{EU, JP, KO}, Atari^{AU, NA}	2007-10-04^{JP}	Yes ^{JP, KO}	Yes	Yes
Dragon Ball Z: Infinite World	Dimps	Bandai^{EU, JP, KO}, Atari^{NA}	2008-12-08^{JP, KO, NA}	Yes ^{JP, KO}	Yes	Yes
Dragon Ball Z: Sagas	Avalanche Software	Atari	2005-03-22^{NA}			Yes
Dragon Blaze	Psikyo	505 GameStreet	2006-06-23^{EU}		Yes	
Dragon Quest & Final Fantasy in Itadaki Street Special	Square Enix	Square Enix	2004-12-22^{JP}	Yes		
Dragon Quest Characters: Torneko no Daiboiken 3 – Fushigi no Dungeon	Chunsoft	Enix Corporation	2002-10-31^{JP}	Yes		
Dragon Quest: Shounen Yangus to Fushigi no Dungeon	Cavia	Square Enix	2006-04-20^{JP}	Yes		
Dragon Quest V: Tenkuu no Hanayome	Matrix Software	Square Enix	2004-03-25^{JP}	Yes		
Dragon Quest VIII: Journey of the Cursed King •Dragon Quest VIII: Sora to Umi to Daichi to Norowareshi Himegimi^{JP} •Dragon Quest: The Journey of the Cursed King^{PAL}	Level-5	Square Enix	2004-11-27^{JP}	Yes	Yes	Yes
Dragon Rage	The 3DO Company	The 3DO Company	2001-11-27^{NA}		Yes	Yes
Dragon Shadow Spell	Flight-Plan	Flight-Plan	2007-01-18^{JP}	Yes		
Dragon Sisters •Simple 2000 Series Vol. 87: The Nadeshiko^{JP}	Tamsoft	D3 Publisher^{JP}, 505 Game Street^{EU}	2005-11-10^{JP}	Yes	Yes	
Dragon's Lair 3D: Special Edition	Dragonstone Software	THQ	2004-03-26^{EU}		Yes	
Drakan: The Ancients' Gates	Surreal Software	Sony Computer Entertainment	2002-01-28^{NA}		Yes	Yes
Drakengard •Drag-on Dragoon^{JP}	Cavia	Square Enix^{AU, JP, NA}, Gathering of Developers^{EU}	2003-09-11^{JP}	Yes	Yes	Yes
Drakengard 2 •Drag-On Dragon 2: Fuuin no Kurenai^{JP}	Cavia	Square Enix^{JP}, Ubisoft^{NA, PAL}	2005-06-16^{JP}	Yes	Yes	Yes
Dramatic Soccer Game: Nippon Daihyou Senshu Ninarou!	Scarab	Enix Corporation	2002-05-23^{JP}	Yes		
Drastic Killer	Tenky	Bandai	2008-07-31^{JP}	Yes		
Dream Audition	Jaleco Entertainment	Jaleco Entertainment	2000-08-03^{JP}	Yes		
Dream Audition 2	Jaleco Entertainment	Jaleco Entertainment	2000-12-14^{JP}	Yes		
Dream Audition 3	Jaleco Entertainment	Pacific Century Cyber Works	2001-07-05^{JP}	Yes		
Dream Audition Super Hit Disc 1	Jaleco Entertainment	Pacific Century Cyber Works	2001-11-22^{JP}	Yes		
Dream Audition Super Hit Disc 2	Jaleco Entertainment	Pacific Century Cyber Works	2001-11-22^{JP}	Yes		
DreamMix TV World Fighters	Bitstep	Hudson Soft	2003-12-18^{JP}	Yes		
DreamWorks & Aardman Flushed Away	Monkey Bar Games	D3 Publisher	2006-10-24^{NA}		Yes	Yes
DreamWorks Kung Fu Panda	Xpec	Activision	2008-06-03^{NA}	Yes ^{KO}	Yes	Yes
DreamWorks Madagascar	Toys for Bob	Activision^{EU, NA}, Bandai^{JP}	2005-05-23^{NA}	Yes	Yes	Yes
DreamWorks Shrek Smash n' Crash Racing	Activision	Activision	2006-11-14^{NA}		Yes	Yes
DreamWorks Shrek SuperSlam	Shaba Games	Activision	2005-10-25^{NA}		Yes	Yes
DreamWorks Shrek the Third	Amaze Entertainment	Activision	2005-05-15^{NA}		Yes	Yes
Drive to Survive •Mashed: Fully Loaded^{EU} •Simple 2000 Ultimate Series Vol. 28: Bousou! Kenka Grand Prix, Drive to Survive^{JP} (Note: update for Mashed: Drive To Survive.)	Supersonic Software	Empire Interactive^{EU, NA}, D3 Publisher^{JP}	2005-03-24^{EU}		Yes	Yes
Driven	BAM! Studios Europe	BAM! Entertainment	2001-11-06^{NA}		Yes	Yes
Driver 3	Reflections Interactive	Atari	2004-06-21^{NA}	Yes	Yes	Yes
Driver: Parallel Lines	Reflections Interactive	Atari^{KO, NA, PAL}, AQ Interactive^{JP}	2006-03-14^{NA}	Yes ^{JP, KO}	Yes	Yes
Driving Emotion Type-S	Escape	Square^{JP}, Square Electronic Arts ^{NA}, Electronic Arts^{EU}	2000-03-30^{JP}	Yes	Yes	Yes
Drome Racers	Attention to Detail	Electronic Arts, Lego Interactive	2002-11-20^{NA}		Yes	Yes
Dropship: United Peace Force	SCE Studios Camden	Sony Computer Entertainment^{EU}, BAM! Entertainment^{NA}	2002-01-18^{EU}		Yes	Yes
DrumMania	Konami Computer Entertainment Japan	Konami	2000-03-04^{JP}	Yes		
DT Carnage	Axis Entertainment	Agetec Inc.	2008-09-06^{NA}			Yes
DT Racer •Axel Impact^{KO}	Axis Entertainment	XS Games^{EU, NA}, SCE Korea^{KO}	2003-10-16^{KO}	Yes ^{KO}	Yes	Yes
Dual Hearts	Matrix Software	Sony Computer Entertainment^{JP}, Atlus^{NA}	2002-02-14^{JP}	Yes		Yes
Duel Masters	High Voltage Software	Atari	2004-11-02^{NA}		Yes	Yes
Duel Masters: Birth of Super Dragon	Shogakukan	Kids Station	2005-03-24^{JP}	Yes		
Duel Savior Destiny	Giga	Alchemist	2005-12-25^{JP}	Yes		
The Dukes of Hazzard: Return of the General Lee	Ratbag Games	Ubisoft	2004-09-28^{NA}		Yes	Yes
D-Unit Drift Racing	Phoenix Games	Phoenix Games	2006-10-13^{EU}		Yes	
Dynamite 100	Phoenix Games	Phoenix Games	2006^{EU}		Yes	
Dynasty Tactics •San Goku Shi Senki^{JP}	Omega Force	Koei	2002-02-14^{JP}	Yes	Yes	Yes
Dynasty Tactics 2 •San Goku Shi Senki 2^{JP}	Omega Force	Koei	2003-06-26^{JP}	Yes	Yes	Yes
Dynasty Warriors 2 •Shin Sangoku Musou^{JP}	Omega Force	Koei^{JP, NA}, Midas Interactive Entertainment^{EU}	2000-08-03^{JP}	Yes	Yes	Yes
Dynasty Warriors 3 •Shin Sangoku Musou 2^{JP}	Omega Force	Koei	2001-09-20^{JP}	Yes ^{AS, JP, KO}	Yes	Yes
Dynasty Warriors 3: Xtreme Legends •Shin Sangoku Musou 2 Mushouden^{JP} (Note: stand-alone expansion for Dynasty Warriors 3.)	Omega Force	Koei	2002-08-29^{JP}	Yes	Yes	Yes
Dynasty Warriors 4 •Shin Sangoku Musou 3^{JP} •Jin Samgung Mussang 3^{KO}	Omega Force	Koei	2003-02-27^{JP}	Yes ^{JP, KO}	Yes	Yes
Dynasty Warriors 4: Empires •Shin Sangoku Musou 3 Empires^{JP} (Note: stand-alone expansion for Dynasty Warriors 4.)	Omega Force	Koei	2004-03-18^{JP}	Yes	Yes	Yes
Dynasty Warriors 4: Xtreme Legends •Shin Sangoku Musou 3 Mushouden^{JP} (Note: stand-alone expansion for Dynasty Warriors 4.)	Omega Force	Koei	2003-09-25^{JP}	Yes	Yes	Yes
Dynasty Warriors 5 •Shin Sangoku Musou 4^{JP}	Omega Force	Koei	2005-02-24^{JP}	Yes	Yes	Yes
Dynasty Warriors 5: Empires •Shin Sangoku Musou 4 Empires^{JP, KO} (Note: stand-alone expansion for Dynasty Warriors 5.)	Omega Force	Koei	2006-03-23^{JP}	Yes ^{JP, KO}	Yes	Yes
Dynasty Warriors 5: Xtreme Legends •Shin Sangoku Musou 4 Moushouden^{JP} (Note: stand-alone expansion for Dynasty Warriors 5.)	Omega Force	Koei	2005-09-15^{JP}	Yes	Yes	Yes
Dynasty Warriors 6 •Shin Sangoku Musou 5 Special^{JP}	Omega Force	Koei	2008-10-02^{JP}	Yes		Yes
Dynasty Warriors: Gundam 2 •Gundam Musou 2^{JP}	Omega Force	Koei	2008-12-18^{JP}	Yes		Yes
Eagle Eye Golf •Enjoy Golf!^{JP}	Telenet Japan	Telenet Japan^{JP}, 505 Game Street^{EU}, Aksys Games^{NA}	2005-06-23^{JP}	Yes	Yes	Yes
Earache Extreme Metal Racing	Metro3D	Metro3D	2007-02-02^{EU}		Yes	
Ecco the Dolphin: Defender of the Future	Appaloosa Interactive	Sony Computer Entertainment^{EU}, Acclaim Entertainment^{NA}	2002-02-22^{EU}		Yes	Yes
Echo Night: Beyond •Nebula: Echo Night^{JP}	FromSoftware	FromSoftware^{JP}, Agetec Inc.^{NA}, Indie Games^{EU}	2004-01-22^{JP}	Yes	Yes	Yes
Ed, Edd n Eddy: The Mis-Edventures	Artificial Mind and Movement	Midway Games	2005-11-03^{NA}		Yes	Yes
Edel Blume	Design Factory	Idea Factory	2008-04-24^{JP}	Yes		
Edit Racing •Simple 2000 Ultimate Series Vol. 2: Edit Racing^{JP}	Yuke's	D3 Publisher	2002-03-28^{JP}	Yes		
Edomono	Global A	Global A	2005-07-07^{JP}	Yes		
Ef: A Fairy Tale of the Two	Minori	ComfortSoft	2010-04-29^{JP}	Yes		
Egg Mania: Eggstreme Madness •Tsukande! Mawashite! Dossun Pazuru Egg Mania^{JP} •Eggo Mania^{EU}	HotGen	Kemco	2002-09-12^{JP, NA}	Yes	Yes	Yes
Eien no Aselia: Kono Daichi no Hate de	Xuse	Nippon Ichi Software	2005-05-12^{JP}	Yes		
Eikan wa Kimini 2002: Koushien no Kodou	Artdink	DigiCube	2002-07-18^{JP}	Yes		
Eikan wa Kimini 2004: Koushien no Kodou	Artdink	Artdink	2004-07-15^{JP}	Yes		
Eikan wa Kimini: Koushien e no Michi	Artdink	Artdink	2000-07-27^{JP}	Yes		
Eikan wa Kimini: Koushien no Hasha	Artdink	Artdink	2001-08-02^{JP}	Yes		
Eisei Meijin IV	Konami	Konami	2000-04-13^{JP}	Yes		
Eisei Meijin V	Konami	Konami	2001-03-29^{JP}	Yes		
Eisei Meijin VI	Konami	Konami	2002-02-28^{JP}	Yes		
Eisei Meijin VII	Konami	Konami	2003-03-13^{JP}	Yes		
El Tigre: The Adventures of Manny Rivera	Blue Tongue Entertainment	THQ	2007-10-29^{NA}		Yes	Yes
Elminage: Yami no Miko to Kamigami no Yubiwa	Starfish SD	Starfish SD	2008-03-27^{JP}	Yes		
Elvandia Story	Spike	Spike	2007-04-26^{JP}	Yes		
Elysion	Terios	NEC Interchannel	2003-05-01^{JP}	Yes		
Empire of Atlantis	Phoenix Games	Phoenix Games	2006^{EU}		Yes	
Endgame	Cunning Developments	Empire Interactive	2002-05-31^{EU}		Yes	Yes
Endonesia	Vanpool	Enix	2001-05-31^{JP}	Yes		
Energy Airforce	Taito	Taito^{JP}, 505 Games^{EU}	2002-09-26^{JP}	Yes	Yes	
Energy Airforce Aim Strike!	Taito	Taito^{JP}, 505 Games^{EU}	2003-10-02^{JP}	Yes	Yes	
England International Football	Codemasters	Codemasters	2004-04-30^{EU}		Yes	
Enter the Matrix	Shiny Entertainment	Infogrames^{EU, NA}, Bandai^{JP}	2003-05-14^{NA}	Yes	Yes	Yes
Enthusia Professional Racing	Konami	Konami	2005-03-17^{JP}	Yes	Yes	Yes
EOE: Eve of Extinction •EOE: Houkai no Zenya^{JP}	Yuke's	Eidos Interactive	2002-02-26^{NA}	Yes	Yes	Yes
Ephemeral Fantasia •Reiselied: Ephemeral Fantasia^{JP}	Konami	Konami	2000-08-10^{JP}	Yes	Yes	Yes
Eragon	Stormfront Studios	Vivendi Games	2006-11-14^{NA}		Yes	Yes
Erde: Nezu no Izuki no Shita de	KID	KID	2002-12-19^{JP}	Yes		
Erementar Gerad: Matoe, Suifuu no Tsurugi	Taito	Taito	2005-06-30^{JP}	Yes		
Escape from Monkey Island	LucasArts	LucasArts	2001-06-18^{NA}		Yes	Yes
Espgaluda	Cave	Arika	2004-06-17^{JP}	Yes		
ESPN College Hoops	Kush Games	Sega	2003-11-13^{NA}			Yes
ESPN College Hoops 2K5	Visual Concepts	Sega	2004-11-17^{NA}			Yes
ESPN International Track & Field •Ganbare Nippon! Olympic 2000^{JP} •International Track & Field 2000^{EU}	Konami	Konami	2000-08-31^{JP}	Yes	Yes	Yes
ESPN International Winter Sports 2002 •Hyper Sports 2002 Winter^{JP}	Konami	Konami	2002-01-28^{NA}	Yes	Yes	Yes
ESPN Major League Baseball	Blue Shift	Sega	2004-05-04^{NA}			Yes
ESPN MLS ExtraTime	Konami	Konami	2001-04-16^{NA}			Yes
ESPN National Hockey Night	Konami	Konami	2001-03-08^{JP}	Yes	Yes	Yes
ESPN NBA 2K5	Visual Concepts	Sega	2004-09-30^{NA}		Yes	Yes
ESPN NBA 2Night	Konami	Konami	2000-12-21^{JP}	Yes	Yes	Yes
ESPN NBA 2Night 2002	Konami	Konami	2002-02-25^{NA}	Yes	Yes	Yes
ESPN NBA Basketball	Visual Concepts	Sega	2003-10-21^{NA}		Yes	Yes
ESPN NFL 2K5 •ESPN NFL 2005^{EU}	Visual Concepts	Sega	2004-07-20^{NA}		Yes	Yes
ESPN NFL Football	Visual Concepts	Sega	2003-09-03^{NA}		Yes	Yes
ESPN NFL PrimeTime 2002	Konami	Konami	2001-12-02^{NA}			Yes
ESPN NHL 2K5	Kush Games	Sega	2004-08-30^{NA}		Yes	Yes
ESPN NHL Hockey	Kush Games	Sega	2003-09-09^{NA}		Yes	Yes
ESPN Winter X-Games Snowboarding	Konami	Konami	2000-10-24^{NA}	Yes	Yes	Yes
ESPN Winter X-Games Snowboarding 2002 •ESPN Winter X-Games Snowboarding 2^{EU}	Konami	Konami	2001-11-29^{JP}	Yes	Yes	Yes
ESPN X-Games Skateboarding	Konami	Konami	2001-08-13^{NA}	Yes	Yes	Yes
Eternal Poison •Poison Pink^{JP}	Flight-Plan	Banpresto^{JP}, Atlus^{NA}	2008-02-14^{JP}	Yes		Yes
Eternal Quest •Simple 2000 Series Vol. 20: The Dungeon RPG^{JP}	Tamsoft	D3 Publisher^{JP}, Midas Interactive Entertainment^{EU}	2002-12-19^{JP}	Yes	Yes	
Eternal Ring	FromSoftware	FromSoftware^{JP}, Agetec^{NA}, Ubisoft^{EU}	2000-03-04^{JP}	Yes	Yes	Yes
E'tude Prologue: Yureugoku Kokoro no Katachi	Takuyo	Takuyo	2006-04-27^{JP}	Yes		
Eureka Seven vol. 2: The New Vision •Eureka Seven: New Vision^{JP}	Bandai	Namco Bandai Games America	2006-05-11^{JP}	Yes		Yes
Eureka Seven vol.1: New Wave •Koukyoushihen Eureka Seven – TR1: New Wave^{JP}	Bandai	Bandai Namco Games	2005-10-27^{JP}	Yes		Yes
Euro Rally Champion	Brain in a Jar	Oxygen Games	2005-09-05^{EU}		Yes	
European Game Collection •Simple 2000 Series Vol. 69: The Board Game Collection^{JP}	Tomcat System	D3 Publisher	2003-09-18^{JP}	Yes		
European Tennis Pro	Magical Company	Phoenix Games	2004^{EU}		Yes	
Evangelion: Jo	Bec	Bandai Namco Games	2009-06-04^{JP}	Yes		
EVE Burst Error Plus	C's Ware	NetVillage	2003-07-24^{JP}	Yes		
EVE: New Generation	Kadokawa Games	Kadokawa Games	2006-08-31^{JP}	Yes		
Ever17: The Out of Infinity	KID	KID	2002-08-29^{JP}	Yes		
Everblue	Arika	Capcom	2001-08-09^{JP}	Yes	Yes	
Everblue 2	Arika	Capcom	2002-08-08^{JP}	Yes	Yes	Yes
Evergrace	FromSoftware	FromSoftware^{JP}, Agetec^{NA}, Ubisoft^{EU}	2000-04-27^{JP}	Yes	Yes	Yes
EverQuest Online Adventures	SOE	SOE	2003-02-09^{NA}		Yes	Yes
EverQuest Online Adventures: Frontiers (Note: update for EverQuest Online Adventures.)	SOE	SOE	2003-11-17^{NA}			Yes
Evil Dead: A Fistful of Boomstick	VIS Entertainment	THQ	2003-05-20^{NA}		Yes	Yes
Evil Dead: Regeneration	Cranky Pants Games	THQ	2005-09-13^{NA}	Yes ^{KO}	Yes	Yes
Evil Twin: Cyprien's Chronicles	In Utero	Ubisoft	2001-12-07^{EU}		Yes	
Evolution Skateboarding	Konami	Konami	2002-10-09^{NA}	Yes	Yes	Yes
Evolution Snowboarding	Konami	Konami	2002-11-26^{NA}	Yes	Yes	Yes
EX Jinsei Game	Takara	Takara	2002-03-07^{JP}	Yes		
EX Jinsei Game II	Takara	Takara	2003-11-06^{JP}	Yes		
EX Okuman Chouja Game	Takara	Takara	2001-12-27^{JP}	Yes		
Ex Zeus	Hyper-Devbox	Metro3D	2004-07-30^{EU}		Yes	
Extermination	Deep Space	Sony Computer Entertainment	2001-03-08^{JP}	Yes	Yes	Yes
Extreme Sprint 3010	Phoenix Games	Phoenix Games	2007^{EU}		Yes	
Eyeshield 21: AmeFoot Yarouze! Ya! Ha!	Konami	Konami	2005-12-22^{JP}	Yes		
EyeToy: AntiGrav	Harmonix Music Systems	Sony Computer Entertainment	2004-11-09^{NA}		Yes	Yes
EyeToy: Chat (Note: includes chess, draughts and naval-combat mini-games.)	Sony Computer Entertainment	Sony Computer Entertainment	2005-02-11^{EU}		Yes	
EyeToy: EduKids	SCE Korea^{KO}, Arisu Media	Sony Computer Entertainment	2005-01-20^{KO}	Yes ^{KO}		
EyeToy: Groove •EyeToy: FuriFuri Dance Tengoku^{JP}	Sony Computer Entertainment	Sony Computer Entertainment	2003-11-14^{EU}	Yes	Yes	Yes
EyeToy: Kinetic	London Studio	Sony Computer Entertainment	2005-09-23^{EU}		Yes	Yes
EyeToy: Kinetic Combat	London Studio	Sony Computer Entertainment	2006-11-17^{EU}		Yes	
EyeToy: Monkey Mania •Saru Eye Toy Oosawagi: Wakki Waki Game Tenkomori!!^{AS, JP, KO}	Sony Computer Entertainment	Sony Computer Entertainment	2004-08-04^{AS}	Yes ^{AS, JP, KO}	Yes	
EyeToy: Operation Spy •SpyToy^{PAL}	London Studio	Sony Computer Entertainment	2005-10-14^{EU}		Yes	Yes
EyeToy: Play	London Studio	Sony Computer Entertainment	2003-07-04^{EU}	Yes	Yes	Yes
EyeToy: Play 2	London Studio	Sony Computer Entertainment	2004-11-05^{EU}	Yes	Yes	Yes
EyeToy: Play 3	London Studio	Sony Computer Entertainment	2005-11-04^{EU}	Yes ^{KO}	Yes	
EyeToy Play: Astro Zoo	London Studio	Sony Computer Entertainment	2007-11-02^{EU}		Yes	
EyeToy Play: Hero	London Studio	Sony Computer Entertainment	2008-11-13^{AU}		Yes	
EyeToy Play: PomPom Party	London Studio	Sony Computer Entertainment	2008-11-12^{EU}		Yes	
EyeToy Play: Sports	London Studio	Sony Computer Entertainment	2006-11-03^{EU}		Yes	
EyeToy: Tales	SCE Korea^{KO}, YBM Sisa.com	Sony Computer Entertainment	2005-03-29^{KO}	Yes ^{KO}		
F: Fanatic	PrincessSoft	PrincessSoft	2004-07-29^{JP}	Yes		
F1 2001	EA Sports	Electronic Arts	2001-09-20^{JP}	Yes	Yes	Yes
F1 2002	EA Sports	Electronic Arts	2002-06-06^{JP}	Yes	Yes	Yes
F1 Career Challenge	EA Sports	Electronic Arts	2003-06-24^{JP}	Yes	Yes	Yes
F1 Championship Season 2000	EA Sports	Electronic Arts	2000-12-15^{EU}	Yes	Yes	Yes
F1 Racing Championship	Ubi Soft Shanghai, Ubi Soft Milan	Video System	2001-03-16^{EU}	Yes	Yes	
The Fairly OddParents: Breakin' Da Rules	Blitz Games	THQ	2003-11-03^{NA}			Yes
The Fairly OddParents: Shadow Showdown	Blitz Games	THQ	2004-09-08^{NA}		Yes	Yes
Falling Stars	Ivolgamus	Ivolgamus^{EU}, Agetec Inc.^{NA}	2007-08-31^{EU}		Yes	Yes
Fallout: Brotherhood of Steel	Interplay Entertainment	Interplay Entertainment	2004-01-14^{NA}	Yes	Yes	Yes
Fame Academy: Dance Edition •Star Academy^{FR}	Monte Cristo	Ubisoft^{UK}Nobilus France^{FR}	2003-11-21^{FR, UK}		Yes ^{FR, UK}	
Family Board Games	Mere Mortals	Liquid Games	2006-01-27^{EU}		Yes	
Family Feud	Atomic Planet	Global Star Software	2006-10-12^{NA}			Yes
Family Guy	High Voltage Software	2K Games	2006-10-02^{NA}		Yes	Yes
Fantastic 4	7 Studios	Activision	2005-06-27^{NA}		Yes	Yes
Fantastic Fortune 2	GeneX	GeneX	2003-06-26^{JP}	Yes		
Fantastic Fortune 2: Triple Star (Note: update for Fantastic Fortune 2.)	GeneX	GeneX	2005-03-03^{JP}	Yes		
Fantastic Four: Rise of the Silver Surfer	7 Studios	Take-Two Interactive	2007-06-15^{NA}		Yes	Yes
Fantasy Battle Kouryaku Box	Koei	Koei	2004-06-24^{JP}	Yes		
The Fantasy Renai Adventure: Kanojo no Densetsu •Simple 2000 Series Vol. 71: The Fantasy Renai Adventure: Kanojo no Densetsu^{JP}	S-Neo	D3 Publisher	2005-02-17^{JP}	Yes		
FantaVision	Sony Computer Entertainment	Sony Computer Entertainment	2000-03-09^{JP}	Yes	Yes	Yes
The Fast and the Furious	Eutechnyx	Namco Bandai Games	2006-09-26^{NA}		Yes	Yes
Fatal Frame •Zero^{JP} •Project Zero^{EU}	Tecmo	Tecmo^{JP, NA}, Wanadoo Edition^{EU}	2001-12-13^{JP}	Yes	Yes	Yes
Fatal Frame II: Crimson Butterfly •Zero: Akai Chou^{JP} •Project Zero II: Crimson Butterfly^{PAL}	Tecmo	Tecmo^{JP, NA}, Ubisoft^{PAL}	2003-11-27^{JP}	Yes	Yes	Yes
Fatal Frame III: The Tormented •Zero: Shisei no Koe^{JP} •Project Zero 3: The Tormented^{EU}	Tecmo	Tecmo^{JP, NA}, Take-Two Interactive^{EU}	2005-07-28^{NA}	Yes	Yes	Yes
Fatal Fury: Battle Archives Vol. 1 •Garou Densetsu Battle Archive 1^{JP}	SNK Playmore	SNK Playmore^{JP, NA}, Ignition Entertainment^{PAL}	2006-07-20^{JP}	Yes	Yes	Yes
Fatal Fury: Battle Archives Vol. 2 •Garou Densetsu Battle Archive 2^{JP}	SNK Playmore	SNK Playmore	2007-02-22^{JP}	Yes	Yes	Yes
Fate/Stay Night : Realta Nua	Type-Moon	Kadokawa Games	2007-04-19^{JP}	Yes		
Fate/Unlimited Codes	Eighting	Capcom	2008-12-18^{JP}	Yes		
The Fear	Digital Frontier	Enix Corporation	2001-07-26^{JP}	Yes		
Ferrari Challenge Trofeo Pirelli	Eutechnyx	Activision^{NA}, System 3^{PAL}	2008-08-26^{NA}		Yes	Yes
Ferrari F355 Challenge	Sega AM2	Sega	2002-09-26^{JP}	Yes	Yes	Yes
Festa!! Hyper Girls Party	KID	KID	2006-06-29^{JP}	Yes		
Fever 6	ICS	ICS	2002-11-07^{JP}	Yes		
Fever 7	ICS	ICS	2003-03-20^{JP}	Yes		
Fever 8	ICS	ICS	2003-08-28^{JP}	Yes		
Fever 9	ICS	ICS	2003-12-25^{JP}	Yes		
FIFA 14: Legacy Edition (Note: update for FIFA Soccer 13.)	EA Canada	Electronic Arts	2013-09-24^{NA}		Yes	Yes
FIFA 2001 •FIFA 2001: World Championship^{JP}	EA Canada	EA Sports	2000-11-21^{EU}	Yes	Yes	Yes
FIFA Soccer 06 •FIFA 06^{EU}	EA Canada	EA Sports	2005-09-30^{EU}	Yes ^{KO}	Yes	Yes
FIFA Soccer 07 •FIFA 07^{EU} •FIFA Soccer 07^{KO}	EA Canada	EA Sports	2006-09-25^{AU}	Yes ^{KO}	Yes	Yes
FIFA Soccer 08 •FIFA 08^{PAL}	EA Canada	EA Sports	2007-09-27^{AU}	Yes ^{KO}	Yes	Yes
FIFA Soccer 09 •FIFA 09^{KO, PAL} •FIFA 09: World Class Soccer^{JP}	EA Canada	EA Sports	2008-10-02^{AU}	Yes ^{JP, KO}	Yes	Yes
FIFA Soccer 10 •FIFA 10^{PAL} •FIFA 10: World Class Soccer^{JP}	HB Studios	EA Sports	2009-10-01^{AU}	Yes	Yes	Yes
FIFA Soccer 11 •FIFA 11^{PAL}	HB Studios	EA Sports	2010-09-28^{NA}	Yes ^{KO}	Yes	Yes
FIFA Soccer 12 •FIFA 12^{PAL}	EA Canada	EA Sports	2011-09-27^{NA}		Yes	Yes
FIFA Soccer 13 •FIFA 13^{PAL}	EA Canada	EA Sports	2012-09-25^{NA}		Yes	Yes
FIFA Soccer 2002 •FIFA 2002^{PAL} •FIFA 2002: Road to FIFA World Cup^{JP}	EA Canada	EA Sports	2001-11-01^{NA}	Yes	Yes	Yes
FIFA Soccer 2003 •FIFA Football 2003^{PAL} •FIFA 2003^{JP}	EA Canada	EA Sports	2002-10-25^{PAL}	Yes ^{JP, KO}	Yes	Yes
FIFA Soccer 2004 •FIFA Football 2004^{PAL} •FIFA 2004^{JP}	EA Canada	EA Sports	2003-10-24^{EU}	Yes	Yes	Yes
FIFA Soccer 2005 •FIFA Football 2005^{PAL}	EA Canada	EA Sports	2004-10-08^{EU}	Yes ^{AS}	Yes	Yes
FIFA Soccer World Championship	Electronic Arts	Electronic Arts Victor	2000-05-25^{JP}	Yes		
FIFA Street	EA Canada	EA Sports Big	2005-02-22^{NA}	Yes ^{JP, KO}	Yes	Yes
FIFA Street 2	EA Canada	EA Sports Big	2006-02-28^{NA}	Yes ^{JP, KO}	Yes	Yes
FIFA Total Football	Electronic Arts	Electronic Arts	2004-03-18^{JP}	Yes		
FIFA Total Football 2	Electronic Arts	Electronic Arts	2004-12-09^{JP}	Yes		
FIFA World Cup: Germany 2006	EA Canada	EA Sports	2006-04-24^{NA}	Yes	Yes	Yes
Fight Club	Genuine Games	Vivendi Universal Games	2004-11-16^{NA}		Yes	Yes
Fight Night 2004	Genuine Games	EA Sports	2004-04-05^{NA}	Yes	Yes	Yes
Fight Night Round 2	EA Sports	EA Sports	2005-02-28^{NA}	Yes	Yes	Yes
Fight Night Round 3	EA Chicago	EA Sports	2006-02-20^{NA}	Yes	Yes	Yes
FightBox	Gamezlab	BBC Multimedia	2004-02-06^{EU}		Yes	
Fighter Maker 2	Enterbrain	Agetec	2002-11-12^{NA}	Yes		Yes
Fighting Angels •Simple 2000 Series Vol. 55: The Catfight: Joneko Densetsu^{EU}	Tamsoft	D3Publisher^{JP}, 505 Game Street^{EU}	2004-06-24^{JP}	Yes	Yes	
Fighting for One Piece	Bandai	Bandai	2005-09-08^{JP}	Yes		
Fighting Fury •Grappler Baki: Baki Saidai no Tournament^{JP}	Tomy	Tomy^{JP}, Midas Interactive Entertainment^{EU}	2000-10-12^{JP}	Yes	Yes	
Final Approach	PrincessSoft	PrincessSoft	2004-10-07^{JP}	Yes		
Final Approach 2: 1st Priority	PrincessSoft	PrincessSoft	2008-02-28^{JP}	Yes		
Final Armada	I-Imagine Interactive	Virgin Play	2007-08-17^{EU}		Yes	
Final Fantasy X	Square	Square^{AS, JP}, Square Electronic Arts^{NA}, Sony Computer Entertainment^{PAL}	2001-07-19^{JP}	Yes ^{JP, KO}	Yes	Yes
Final Fantasy X-2 •Final Fantasy X-2: International + Last Mission^{JP} (different version)	Square	Square^{AS, JP}, Square Enix^{KO, NA}, Electronic Arts^{PAL}	2003-03-13^{JP}	Yes ^{AS, JP, KO}	Yes	Yes
Final Fantasy XI	Square	SquareSoft^{JP}, Sony Computer Entertainment^{NA}	2002-05-16^{JP}	Yes		Yes
Final Fantasy XI: Chains of Promathia •Final Fantasy XI: Promathia no Jubaku^{JP} (Note: expansion for Final Fantasy XI.)	Square Enix	Square Enix	2004-09-16^{JP}	Yes		Yes
Final Fantasy XI: Rise of the Zilart •Final Fantasy XI: Zilart no Genei^{JP} •Final Fantasy XI: All-in-One Pack 2003^{JP} (Note: expansion for Final Fantasy XI.)	Square Enix	Square Enix	2003-04-17^{JP}	Yes		
Final Fantasy XI: Seekers of Adoulin •Final Fantasy XI: Adoulin no Makyou^{JP} (Note: expansion for Final Fantasy XI.)	Square Enix	Square Enix	2013-03-27^{JP}	Yes		
Final Fantasy XI: Treasures of Aht Urhgan •Final Fantasy XI: Aht Urhgan no Hihou^{JP} •Final Fantasy XI: All-In-One Pack 2006^{JP} (Note: expansion for Final Fantasy XI.)	Square Enix	Square Enix	2006-04-18^{NA}	Yes		Yes
Final Fantasy XI: Wings of the Goddess •Final Fantasy XI: Altana no Shinpei^{JP} (Note: expansion for Final Fantasy XI.)	Square Enix	Square Enix	2007-11-20^{NA}	Yes		Yes
Final Fantasy XII •Final Fantasy XII International Zodiac Job System^{AS, JP, KO} (different version)	Square Enix	Square Enix	2006-03-14^{AS}	Yes ^{AS, JP, KO}	Yes	Yes
Final Fight: Streetwise	Capcom Production Studio 8	Capcom	2006-02-28^{NA}		Yes	Yes
Finalist	PrincessSoft	PrincessSoft	2006-01-26^{JP}	Yes		
Finkles World	Phoenix Games	Phoenix Games	2005^{EU}		Yes	
Finny The Fish & The Seven Waters •Uo-7-tsu no Mizu to Densetsu no Nushi^{JP}	Sony Computer Entertainment	Sony Computer Entertainment^{JP}, Natsume Inc.^{NA}	2004-07-15^{JP}	Yes		Yes
Fire Blade	Kuju Entertainment	Midway Games	2002-06-16^{NA}		Yes	Yes
Fire Heroes •Hard Luck^{JP}	Spike	Spike^{JP}, 505 Game Street^{EU}	2004-10-28^{JP}	Yes	Yes	
Fire Pro Wrestling Returns •Fi-Pro Returns^{JP}	S-Neo	Spike^{JP}, Agetec^{NA}, 505 Game Street^{EU}	2005-09-15^{JP}	Yes	Yes	Yes
Fire Pro Wrestling Z	Spike	Spike	2003-06-05^{JP}	Yes		
Firefighter F.D. 18	Konami	Konami	2004-02-26^{JP}	Yes	Yes	Yes
First Kiss * Monogatari I & II	M2	Broccoli	2003-07-17^{JP}	Yes		
Fisherman's Bass Club •Simple 2000 Series Vol. 3: The Bass Fishing^{JP} •Bass Master Fishing^{EU}	Vingt-eu-un Systems	D3 Publisher^{JP}, Agetec Inc.^{EU, NA}	2002-03-28^{JP}	Yes	Yes	Yes
Fisherman's Challenge	Konami	Konami	2003-01-19^{NA}		Yes	Yes
Fishing Fantasy: BuzzRod •Buzz Rod: Fishing Fantasy^{JP}	Starfish SD	Starfish SD^{JP}, 505 Game Street^{EU}	2005-01-06^{JP}	Yes	Yes	
Fitness Fun •Simple 2000 Ultimate Series Vol. 18: Love * Aerobie^{JP}	Tamsoft	D3 Publisher^{JP}, 505 Game Street^{EU}	2004-02-26^{JP}	Yes	Yes	
Flame of Recca: Final Burning •Recca no Honoo: Final Burning^{JP}	KCEJ	Konami	2004-06-10^{JP}	Yes		
FlatOut •Racing Game: Chuui!!!!^{JP}	Bugbear Entertainment	Empire Interactive^{EU, NA}, Konami^{JP}	2004-11-05^{EU}	Yes	Yes	Yes
FlatOut 2 •FlatOut 2 GTR^{JP}	Bugbear Entertainment	Empire Interactive^{EU, KO, NA}, Konami^{JP}	2006-06-30^{EU}	Yes	Yes	Yes
The Flintstones: Bedrock Racing	Coyote Console, Beyond Reality	Blast! Entertainment Ltd	2007-10-02^{EU}		Yes	
The Flintstones in Viva Rock Vegas	Toka	Swing! Deutschland	2001-07-06^{EU}		Yes	
Flipnic: Ultimate Pinball •Flipnic^{JP}	Sony Computer Entertainment	Sony Computer Entertainment^{JP}, Ubisoft^{EU}, Capcom^{NA}	2005-07-13^{NA}	Yes	Yes	Yes
Flow: Urban Dance Uprising	Artificial Mind and Movement	Ubisoft	2005-11-15^{EU, NA}		Yes	Yes
Flower, Sun, and Rain •Hana to Taiyō to Ame to^{JP}	Grasshopper Manufacture	Victor Interactive	2001-05-02^{JP}	Yes		
Football Generation	Trecision	Midas Interactive Entertainment	2006-11-10^{EU}		Yes	
Football Kingdom: Trial Edition	Namco	Namco	2004-05-27^{JP}	Yes		
For Symphony: With All One's Heart	Takuyo	Takuyo	2005-05-26^{JP}	Yes		
Ford Bold Moves Street Racing •Ford Street Racing^{EU} •Ford Street Racing XR Edition^{AU}	Razorworks	Xplosiv^{PAL}, Eidos Interactive^{NA}	2006-02-24^{EU}		Yes	Yes
Ford Mustang: The Legend Lives	Eutechnyx	2K Games	2005-04-19^{NA}		Yes	Yes
Ford Racing 2	Razorworks	Gotham Games^{NA}, Empire Interactive^{EU}	2003-10-28^{NA}		Yes	Yes
Ford Racing 3	Razorworks	Empire Interactive^{EU}, 2K Games^{NA}	2004-10-29^{EU}		Yes	Yes
Ford Racing: Off Road •Off Road^{EU}	Razorworks	Xplosiv^{EU}, Empire Interactive^{NA}	2008-03-20^{EU}		Yes	Yes
Ford vs. Chevy	Eutechnyx	Global Star Software	2005-11-09^{NA}		Yes	Yes
Forever Kingdom •Evergrace II^{JP}	FromSoftware	FromSoftware^{JP}, Agetec Inc.^{NA}	2001-06-21^{JP}	Yes		Yes
Forgotten Realms: Demon Stone	Stormfront Studios	Atari	2004-09-14^{NA}	Yes ^{JP, KO}	Yes	Yes
Formation Final •Soccer Kantoku Saihai Simulation: Formation Final^{JP}	Konami	Konami	2003-09-18^{JP}	Yes		
Formula Challenge	Aqua Pacific	Oxygen Games	2004-06-25^{EU}		Yes	
Formula One 04	Studio Liverpool	Sony Computer Entertainment	2004-06-30^{EU}	Yes	Yes	
Formula One 05 •Formula One 2005^{EU}	Studio Liverpool	Sony Computer Entertainment	2005-07-01^{EU}	Yes	Yes	
Formula One 06	Studio Liverpool	Sony Computer Entertainment	2006-07-28^{EU}	Yes	Yes	
Formula One 2001	Studio Liverpool	Sony Computer Entertainment	2001-04-20^{EU}	Yes	Yes	Yes
Formula One 2002	Studio Liverpool	Sony Computer Entertainment	2002-11-01^{EU}	Yes	Yes	
Formula One 2003	Studio Liverpool	Sony Computer Entertainment	2003-07-11^{EU}		Yes	
Forty 4 Party •Simple 2000 Series Vol. 2: The Party Game^{JP}	HuneX	D3 Publisher^{JP}, 505 Game Street^{EU}	2001-11-08^{JP}	Yes	Yes	
Fragments Blue	SilverBullet	Kadokawa Games	2006-01-19^{JP}	Yes		
Fragrance Tale	Takuyo	Takuyo	2005-04-28^{JP}	Yes		
Frank Herbert's Dune	WideScreen Games	Cryo Interactive	2001-11-14^{EU}		Yes	
Frankie Dettori Racing •Melbourne Cup Challenge^{AU}	Sidhe	Tru Blu Entertainment	2006-10-26^{AU}		Yes	
Franklin: A Birthday Surprise	Neko Entertainment	The Game Factory	2006-03-31^{EU}		Yes	Yes
Freak Out: Extreme Freeride	Coldwood Interactive	JoWooD Entertainment	2007-03-30^{EU}		Yes	
Freaky Flyers	Midway Games	Midway Games	2003-08-05^{NA}		Yes	Yes
Free Running	Rebellion Developments	Ubisoft^{AU}, Reef Entertainment^{EU}	2007-04-05^{AU}		Yes	
Freedom Fighters	IO Interactive	Electronic Arts	2003-09-26^{EU}	Yes	Yes	Yes
Freekstyle	Page 44 Studios	EA Sports Big	2002-06-17^{NA}	Yes	Yes	Yes
Freestyle MetalX	Deibus Studios	Midway Games	2003-06-27^{NA}		Yes	Yes
Frequency	Harmonix Music Systems	Sony Computer Entertainment	2001-11-19^{NA}		Yes	Yes
Friends: Seishun no Kagayaki	F&C	NEC Interchannel	2004-09-30^{JP}	Yes		
Friends: The One with All the Trivia	Artech Studios	Warner Bros. Interactive Entertainment	2005-11-15^{NA}		Yes	Yes
Frogger: Ancient Shadow	Hudson Soft	Konami	2005-09-27^{NA}			Yes
Frogger Beyond •Frogger^{JP}	Konami	Konami	2003-06-26^{JP}	Yes	Yes	
Frogger: The Great Quest	Konami	Konami	2001-11-18^{NA}		Yes	Yes
Frogger's Adventures: The Rescue •Frogger Rescue^{JP}	Konami	Konami	2003-10-29^{NA}	Yes		Yes
From Russia with Love •007: Russia Yori Ai Okomete^{JP}	EA Redwood Shores	Electronic Arts	2005-11-01^{NA}	Yes	Yes	Yes
Front Mission 4	Square Enix	Square Enix	2003-12-18^{JP}	Yes		Yes
Front Mission 5: Scars of the War	Square Enix	Square Enix	2005-12-29^{JP}	Yes		
Front Mission Online	Square Enix	Square Enix	2005-05-12^{JP}	Yes		
Fruit Machine Mania	Liquid Games	OG International Ltd	2006-05-12^{EU}		Yes	
Fruitfall	Phoenix Games	Phoenix Games	2007^{EU}		Yes	
Fugitive Hunter: War on Terror	Black Ops Entertainment	Encore Software^{NA}, Play It!^{EU}	2003-11-18^{NA}		Yes	Yes
Fukakutei Sekai no Tantei Shinshi: Akugyou Futaasa no Jiken File	Abel Software	Abel Software	2009-01-29^{JP}	Yes		
Full House Kiss	Tenky	Capcom	2004-07-22^{JP}	Yes		
Full House Kiss 2	Tenky	Capcom	2006-02-23^{JP}	Yes		
Full Spectrum Warrior	Pandemic Studios	THQ^{EU, KO, NA}, Sega^{JP}	2005-03-28^{NA}	Yes ^{JP, KO}	Yes	Yes
Full Spectrum Warrior: Ten Hammers •Full Spectrum Warrior 2: Ten Hammers^{JP}	Pandemic Studios	THQ^{EU, KO, NA}, Sega^{JP}	2006-03-28^{NA}	Yes ^{JP, KO}	Yes	Yes
Fullmetal Alchemist 2: Curse of the Crimson Elixir •Hagane no Renkinjutsushi 2: Akaki Elixir no Akuma^{JP}	Racjin	Square Enix	2004-09-22^{JP}	Yes		Yes
Fullmetal Alchemist 3: The Girl who Succeeds God •Hagane no Renkinjutsushi 3: Kami o Tsugu Shoujo^{JP}	Racjin	Square Enix	2005-07-21^{JP}	Yes		
Fullmetal Alchemist and the Broken Angel •Hagane no Renkinjutsushi: Tobenai Tenshi^{JP}	Racjin	Square Enix	2003-12-25^{JP}	Yes		Yes
Fullmetal Alchemist: Dream Carnival •Hagane no Renkinjutsushi: Dream Carnival^{JP}	Eighting	Bandai	2004-08-26^{JP}	Yes		
Fur Fighters: Viggo's Revenge	Bizarre Creations	Acclaim Entertainment	2001-06-03^{NA}		Yes	Yes
Furasera: Hurrah! Sailor	Datam Polystar	Datam Polystar	2004-02-26^{JP}	Yes		
Furry Tales	Mad Monkey	Phoenix Games	2004-10-22^{EU}		Yes	
Fushigi no Kuni no Alice	Global A	Global A	2003-06-12^{JP}	Yes		
Fushigi no Umi no Nadia: Inherit the Blue Water	Jinx	Jinx	2005-09-22^{JP}	Yes		
Fushigi Yuugi: Genbu Kaiten Gaiden - Kagami no Miko	Idea Factory	Idea Factory	2005-06-23^{JP}	Yes		
Fushigi Yuugi: Suzaku Ibun	Idea Factory	Idea Factory	2008-05-29^{JP}	Yes		
Futakoi	Alpha Unit	MediaWorks	2004-12-09^{JP}	Yes		
Futakoi Alternative	Marvelous Entertainment	Marvelous Entertainment	2005-06-23^{JP}	Yes		
Futakoi: Koi to Mizugi no Survival	Alpha Unit	MediaWorks	2005-08-25^{JP}	Yes		
Futari no Fantavision (Note: update for FantaVision.)	SCEJ	SCEJ	2002-07-04^{JP}	Yes		
Futurama	Unique Development Studios	SCi Games^{EU}, Vivendi Universal Games^{NA}	2003-08-01^{EU}		Yes	Yes
Future Tactics: The Uprising	Zed Two	JoWood Entertainment	2004-05-10^{NA}		Yes	Yes
Fuun Bakumatsuden	Genki	Genki	2005-01-20^{JP}	Yes		
Fuuraiki	FOG Inc.	FOG Inc.	2006-09-28^{JP}	Yes		
Fuuraiki 2	FOG Inc.	FOG Inc.	2005-11-10^{JP}	Yes		
Fuuun Shinsengumi	Genki	Konami	2004-01-22^{JP}	Yes ^{JP, KO}		
Fuuun Super Combo	SNK Playmore	SNK Playmore	2007-06-21^{JP}	Yes		
G1 Jockey •G1 Jockey 2 2001^{JP} (Note: update for G1 Jockey 2.)	Koei/Inis	Koei^{JP}, THQ^{EU}	2001-03-22^{JP}	Yes	Yes	
G1 Jockey 2	Koei/Inis	Koei^{JP}	2000-11-02^{JP}	Yes		
G1 Jockey 3	Koei/Inis	Koei^{JP, NA}, THQ^{EU}	2002-12-21^{JP}	Yes	Yes	Yes
G1 Jockey 3 2003 (Note: update for G1 Jockey 3.)	Koei/Inis	Koei	2003-10-30^{JP}	Yes		
G1 Jockey 3 2005 Nendoban (Note: update for G1 Jockey 3.)	Koei	Koei	2005-02-24^{JP}	Yes		
G1 Jockey 4	Koei	Koei	2005-12-22^{JP}	Yes	Yes	
G1 Jockey 4 2006 (Note: update for G1 Jockey 4.)	Koei	Koei	2006-09-14^{JP}	Yes		
G1 Jockey 4 2007 (Note: update for G1 Jockey 4.)	Koei	Koei	2007-11-01^{JP}	Yes		
G1 Jockey 4 2008 (Note: update for G1 Jockey 4.)	Koei	Koei	2008-09-18^{JP}	Yes		
Gacharoku	Agenda	Sony Computer Entertainment	2002-12-05^{JP}	Yes		
Gacharoku 2: Kondo wa Sekai Isshuu yo!!	Agenda	Sony Computer Entertainment	2003-12-18^{JP}	Yes		
Gachinko Pro Yakyuu	Now Production	Now Production	2003-08-07^{JP}	Yes		
Gadget & the Gadgetinis	EKO Software	Hip Games	2004-11-05^{EU}		Yes	
Gadget Racers •Choro Q HG^{JP} •Penny Racers^{PAL}	Barnhouse Effect	Takara^{JP}, Conspiracy Entertainment^{NA}, Midas Interactive Entertainment^{PAL}	2000-12-21^{JP}	Yes	Yes	Yes
Gadget Racers •Choro Q HG 3^{JP}	Takara	Takara^{JP}, Zoo Digital Publishing^{PAL}	2002-12-12^{JP}	Yes	Yes	
Gaelic Games: Football	IR Gurus	Sony Computer Entertainment	2005-11-11^{IE}		Yes	
Gaelic Games: Football 2	IR Gurus	Sony Computer Entertainment	2007-08-17^{IE}		Yes	
Gaelic Games: Hurling	IR Gurus	Sony Computer Entertainment	2007-11-30^{IE}		Yes	
Gaika no Gouhou: Air Land Force	Koei	Koei	2003-08-28^{JP}	Yes		
Gakkou o Tsukurou!! Happy Days	Marvelous Entertainment	Marvelous Entertainment	2005-03-24^{JP}	Yes		
Gakuen Alice: KiraKira Memory Kiss	Kids Station	Kids Station	2006-06-22^{JP}	Yes		
Gakuen Heaven: Boy's Love Scramble!	Spray	NEC Interchannel	2003-11-27^{JP}	Yes		
Gakuen Heaven: Boy's Love Scramble: Type B (Note: update for Gakuen Heaven: Boy's Love Scramble!.)	Spray	NEC Interchannel	2004-07-22^{JP}	Yes		
Gakuen Heaven: Okawari! Boy's Love Attack! (Note: stand-alone expansion for Gakuen Heaven: Boy's Love Scramble!.)	Spray	Interchannel	2005-02-24^{JP}	Yes		
Gakuen Toshi Vara Noir	Idea Factory	Idea Factory	2002-10-31^{JP}	Yes		
Gakuen Utopia: Manabi Straight! KiraKira Happy Festa!	Marvelous Entertainment	Marvelous Entertainment	2007-03-29^{JP}	Yes		
Galactic Wrestling: Featuring Ultimate Muscle •Kinnikuman Generations^{JP}	AKI Corp.	Bandai	2004-04-22^{JP}	Yes		Yes
Galaxy Angel	Broccoli	Broccoli	2003-04-17^{JP}	Yes		
Galaxy Angel: Eternal Lovers	Broccoli	Broccoli	2005-02-24^{JP}	Yes		
Galaxy Angel II: Eigou Kaiki no Koku	Broccoli	Broccoli	2009-03-12^{JP}	Yes		
Galaxy Angel II: Mugen Kairou no Kagi	Broccoli	Broccoli	2007-10-18^{JP}	Yes		
Galaxy Angel II: Zettairyouiki no Tobira	Broccoli	Broccoli	2006-06-22^{JP}	Yes		
Galaxy Angel: Moonlit Lovers	Broccoli	Broccoli	2004-02-26^{JP}	Yes		
Galerians: Ash	Polygon Magic	Enterbrain^{JP}, |Sammy^{NA, PAL}	2002-04-25^{JP}	Yes	Yes	Yes
Gallop Racer 2001 •Gallop Racer 5^{JP}	Tecmo	Tecmo	2001-03-29^{JP}	Yes		Yes
Gallop Racer 2003: A New Breed •Gallop Racer 6: Revolution^{JP} •At the Races Presents Gallop Racer^{PAL}	Tecmo	Tecmo^{JP, NA}, Zoo Digital Publishing^{PAL}	2002-12-12^{JP}	Yes	Yes	Yes
Gallop Racer 2004 •Gallop Racer Lucky 7^{JP} •Gallop Racer 2^{PAL}	Tecmo	Tecmo^{JP, NA}, Zoo Digital Publishing^{PAL}	2004-02-19^{JP}	Yes	Yes	Yes
Gallop Racer 2006 •Gallop Racer 8: Live Horse Racing^{JP}	Tecmo	Tecmo	2005-12-15^{JP}	Yes		Yes
Gallop Racer Inbreed	Tecmo	Tecmo	2006-11-02^{JP}	Yes		
Gambler Densetsu Tetsuya	Athena	Athena	2001-06-21^{JP}	Yes		
Gambler Densetsu Tetsuya Digest	Athena	Athena	2004-05-27^{JP}	Yes		
Gambler Densetsu Tetsuya: Kurouto Choujou Kessen	Athena	Athena	2003-07-03^{JP}	Yes		
Game Center USA: Midway Arcade Treasures	Success	Success	2006-09-21^{JP}	Yes		
Game ni Nattayo! Dokuro-chan	Idea Factory	Idea Factory	2005-11-10^{JP}	Yes		
Game Select 5 Wa	Yuki	Yuki	2000-09-28^{JP}	Yes		
Game Select 5 You	Yuki	Yuki	2001-01-25^{JP}	Yes		
Games Galaxy 2	Phoenix Games	Phoenix Games	2006^{EU}		Yes	
Gantz: The Game	Konami	Konami	2005-03-17^{JP}	Yes		
Garfield	The Code Monkeys	Hip Games	2004-11-19^{EU}		Yes	
Garfield 2	Asobo Studio	The Game Factory	2006-10-06^{EU}		Yes	
Garfield: Lasagna World Tour	EKO Software	Blast! Entertainment Ltd^{EU}, Conspiracy Entertainment^{NA}	2007-11-30^{EU}		Yes	Yes
Garfield: Saving Arlene •Garfield: Arleene o Sukue!^{JP}	EKO Software	Titus Japan KK^{JP}, Hip Games^{EU}	2006-04-27^{JP}	Yes	Yes	
Garou: Mark of the Wolves	SNK Playmore	SNK Playmore	2005-06-30^{JP}	Yes		
Garouden Breakblow	Opus	ESP Software	2005-11-17^{JP}	Yes		
Garouden Breakblow: Fist or Twist	Opus	ESP Software	2007-03-15^{JP}	Yes		
Gauntlet: Dark Legacy	Midway Games West	Midway Games	2001-05-01^{NA}	Yes	Yes	Yes
Gauntlet: Seven Sorrows	Midway Games	Midway Games	2005-12-12^{NA}		Yes	Yes
Gecko Blaster	Phoenix Games	Phoenix Games	2007-12-01^{EU}		Yes	
Gegege no Kitarou: Ibun Youkai Kitan	WinkySoft	Konami	2003-12-11^{JP}	Yes		
The Gekai •Simple 2000 Series Vol. 58: The Gekai^{JP}	Vingt-et-un Systems	D3 Publisher	2004-09-02^{JP}	Yes		
Gekikuukan Pro Yakyuu: At the End of the Century 1999	SquareSoft	SquareSoft	2000-09-07^{JP}	Yes		
Gekitou Pro Yakyuu	Wow Entertainment	Sega	2003-09-11^{JP}	Yes		
Gendai Daisenryaku: Isshoku Sokuhatsu - Gunji Balance Houkai	SystemSoft	SystemSoft	2009-08-27^{JP}	Yes		
Gene Troopers	Caludron Ltd.	Playlogic	2006-12-27^{EU}		Yes	
Generation of Chaos	Idea Factory	Idea Factory	2001-08-09^{JP}	Yes		
Generation of Chaos Desire	Idea Factory	Idea Factory	2007-09-27^{JP}	Yes		
Generation of Chaos III: Toki no Fuuin	Idea Factory	Idea Factory	2003-05-08^{JP}	Yes		
Generation of Chaos IV •Shinten Makai: Generation of Chaos IV^{JP}	Idea Factory	Idea Factory	2004-04-22^{JP}	Yes		
Generation of Chaos Next	Idea Factory	Idea Factory	2002-04-25^{JP}	Yes		
Genji: Dawn of the Samurai •Genji^{AS, JP, KO, PAL}	Game Republic	Sony Computer Entertainment	2005-06-28^{AS}	Yes ^{AS, JP, KO}	Yes	Yes
Genshi no Kotoba	Sony Computer Entertainment	Sony Computer Entertainment	2001-10-18^{JP}	Yes		
Georama Sensen Ijou Nashi: Stalingrad e no Michi	Marionette	Marionette	2005-06-23^{JP}	Yes		
George of the Jungle and the Search for the Secret •George of the Jungle^{EU}	Crave Entertainment	Crave Entertainment^{NA}, Ignition Entertainment^{EU}	2008-03-18^{NA}		Yes	Yes
Germany's Next Topmodel 2009	SevenOne Intermedia	SevenOne Intermedia	2009-05-21^{EU}		Yes	
Get on da Mic	A2M	Eidos Interactive	2004-10-05^{NA}		Yes	Yes
Get Ride! AMDriver: Soukoku no Shinjitsu	WinkySoft	Konami	2005-03-24^{JP}	Yes		
The Getaway	Team Soho	Sony Computer Entertainment	2002-12-11^{PAL}	Yes ^{JP, KO}	Yes	Yes
The Getaway: Black Monday	London Studio	Sony Computer Entertainment	2004-11-12^{PAL}	Yes	Yes	Yes
GetBackers Dakkanya: Dakkandayo! Zenin Shuugou!!	Konami	Konami	2003-01-16^{JP}	Yes		
GetBackers Dakkanya: Ubawareta Mugenjou	Konami	Konami	2002-09-26^{JP}	Yes		
GetBackers Dakkanya: Urashinshiku Saikyou Battle	Konami	Konami	2004-04-29^{JP}	Yes		
Getsumento Heiki Mina: Futatsu no Project M	Idea Factory	Idea Factory	2007-07-26^{JP}	Yes		
G-Force	Eurocom	Disney Interactive Studios	2009-07-21^{NA}		Yes	Yes
G-Force (2006)	Mere Mortals	Phoenix Games	2006-10-06^{EU}		Yes	
Ghost in the Shell: Stand Alone Complex •Koukaku Kidoutai: Stand Alone Complex^{JP, KO}	Cavia	Sony Computer Entertainment^{JP, KO}, Bandai^{NA, PAL}	2004-03-04^{JP}	Yes ^{JP, KO}	Yes	Yes
Ghost Master: The Gravenville Chronicles	Empire Interactive	Empire Interactive	2004-08-27^{EU}		Yes	
Ghost Rider	Climax Group	2K Games	2007-02-13^{NA}		Yes	Yes
Ghost Vibration	Artoon	Eidos Interactive^{JP}, Infogrames^{EU}	2002-07-04^{JP}	Yes	Yes	
Ghostbusters: The Video Game	Red Fly Studio	Atari ^{NA}, Sony Computer Entertainment^{PAL}	2009-06-16^{NA}		Yes	Yes
Ghosthunter	SCE Studio Cambridge	Sony Computer Entertainment^{EU}, Namco^{NA}, Electronic Arts^{JP}	2003-12-05^{EU}	Yes	Yes	Yes
G.I. Joe: The Rise of Cobra	Double Helix Games	Electronic Arts	2009-08-04^{AU, NA}		Yes	Yes
Giant Robo: The Animation - Chikyuu ga Seishisuru Hi	Tamsoft	D3 Publisher	2004-11-03^{JP}	Yes		
Giants: Citizen Kabuto	Planet Moon Studios	Interplay Entertainment	2001-12-20^{NA}		Yes	Yes
Gift	EKO Software	Cryo Interactive	2001-07-06^{EU}		Yes	
Gift: Prism	Moonstone	Sweets	2006-10-19^{JP}	Yes		
Gigawing Generations •Yokushin: Giga Wing Generations^{JP}	Takumi Corporation	Taito^{JP}, 505 Game Street^{EU}	2005-03-24^{JP}	Yes	Yes	
Gin no Eclipse	NIne'sFox	NIne'sFox	2008-07-31^{JP}	Yes		
Gintama Gin-San to Issho! Boku no Kabuki Machi Nikki	Bandai Namco Games	Bandai Namco Games	2007-08-30^{JP}	Yes		
Girl Zone	Mere Mortals	Phoenix Games	2005^{EU}		Yes	
Girls Bravo: Romance 15's	Kadokawa Games	Kadokawa Games	2005-01-27^{JP}	Yes		
GitaDora! Guitar Freaks 4th Mix & DrumMania 3rd Mix	Konami	Konami	2001-09-20^{JP}	Yes		
Gitaroo Man	Koei/Inis	Koei	2001-06-21^{JP}	Yes	Yes	Yes
Gladiator: Sword of Vengeance	Acclaim Studios Manchester	Acclaim Entertainment	2003-11-05^{NA}		Yes	Yes
Gladius	LucasArts	LucasArts^{NA}, Activision^{EU}	2003-10-28^{NA}		Yes	Yes
Glass Rose •Garasu no Bara^{JP}	Cing	Capcom	2003-11-06^{JP}	Yes	Yes	
Global Defence Force •Simple 2000 Series Vol. 81: The Chikyuu Boueigun 2^{JP} •The Terra Defence Force 2^{KO}	Sandlot	D3 Publisher^{JP, KO}, Essential Games^{EU}	2005-07-28^{JP}	Yes ^{JP, KO}	Yes	
Global Defence Force: Tactics •Simple 2000 Series Vol. 103: The Chikyuu Boueigun Tactics^{JP}	Sandlot	D3 Publisher^{JP}, Essential Games^{EU}	2006-07-27^{JP}	Yes	Yes	
Global Folktale	Idea Factory	Idea Factory	2001-10-25^{JP}	Yes		
Global Touring Challenge: Africa	Rage Software	Xplosiv^{PAL}, Majesco^{NA}, Success^{JP}	2001-11-16^{EU}	Yes	Yes	Yes
Go, Diego, Go! Great Dinosaur Rescue	High Voltage Software	2K Play	2008-10-27^{NA}		Yes	Yes
Go, Diego, Go! Safari Rescue	High Voltage Software	2K Play	2008-02-11^{NA}		Yes	Yes
Go Go Copter •PuchiCopter^{JP}	Aqua Systems	Aqua Systems^{JP}, Empire Interactive^{EU}	2003-03-13^{JP}	Yes	Yes	
Go Go Golf •Magical Sports Go Go Golf^{JP}	Mahou	Mahou^{JP}, Midas Interactive Entertainment^{EU}	2000-09-21^{JP}	Yes	Yes	
Go Kart Rally	Phoenix Games	Phoenix Games	2007-04-20^{EU}		Yes	
Goblin Commander: Unleash the Horde	Jaleco Entertainment	Jaleco Entertainment	2003-11-11^{NA}		Yes	Yes
Gobuato no Sekai	Media Factory	Media Factory	2001-08-02^{JP}	Yes		
God Hand	Clover Studio	Capcom	2006-09-14^{JP}	Yes ^{JP, KO}	Yes	Yes
God of War	Santa Monica Studio	Sony Computer Entertainment^{KO, NA, PAL}, Capcom^{JP}	2005-03-22^{NA}	Yes ^{JP, KO}	Yes	Yes
God of War II •God of War II: Shuuen No Jokyoku^{JP}	Santa Monica Studio	Sony Computer Entertainment^{KO, NA, PAL}, Capcom^{JP}	2007-03-13^{NA}	Yes ^{JP, KO}	Yes	Yes
Godai Elemental Force	3DO	3DO	2002-01-21^{NA}		Yes	Yes
The Godfather •Der Pate^{DE} •El Padrino^{ES} •Il Padrino^{IT} •Le Parrain^{FR}	Page 44 Studios	Electronic Arts	2006-03-03^{KO}	Yes ^{JP, KO}	Yes	Yes
Godzilla: Save the Earth •Godzilla Kaijuu Dairansen: Chikyuu Saishuu Kessen^{JP}	Pipeworks Studios	Atari	2004-11-02^{NA}	Yes	Yes	Yes
Godzilla: Unleashed	Pipeworks Studios	Atari	2007-11-20^{NA}		Yes	Yes
Gokujou Seitokai	Konami	Konami	2005-09-15^{JP}	Yes		
Gokuraku Jan Premium	Enterbrain	DigiCube	2003-07-31^{JP}	Yes		
Gold X	Aruze	Nippon Amuse	2003-11-27^{JP}	Yes		
Golden Age of Racing	Brain in a Jar	Midas Interactive Entertainment	2005-09-02^{EU}		Yes	
The Golden Compass	Shiny Entertainment	Sega	2007-11-30^{NA}		Yes	Yes
GoldenEye: Rogue Agent •GoldenEye: Dark Agent^{JP}	Electronic Arts	Electronic Arts	2004-11-22^{NA}	Yes	Yes	Yes
Golf Navigator Vol. 1	Dual	Spike	2001-06-28^{JP}	Yes		
Golf Navigator Vol. 2	Dual	Spike	2001-06-28^{JP}	Yes		
Golf Navigator Vol. 3	Dual	Spike	2001-09-06^{JP}	Yes		
Golf Navigator Vol. 4	Dual	Spike	2001-09-20^{JP}	Yes		
Golf Paradise DX	T&E Soft	T&E Soft	2000-12-14^{JP}	Yes		
Goosebumps HorrorLand	Gusto Games	Scholastic, Inc.	2008-10-30^{NA}			Yes
Gradius III and IV •Gradius III and IV: Fukkatsu no Shinwa^{JP}	Konami	Konami	2000-04-13^{JP}	Yes	Yes	Yes
Gradius V	Konami	Konami	2004-07-22^{JP}	Yes ^{JP, KO}	Yes	Yes
Graffiti Kingdom •Rakugaki Oukoku 2^{JP}	Taito	Taito^{JP}, 505 Game Street^{EU}, Hot-B^{NA}	2004-09-22^{NA}	Yes	Yes	Yes
Gran Turismo 3 A-Spec	Polyphony Digital	Sony Computer Entertainment	2001-04-28^{JP}	Yes	Yes	Yes
Gran Turismo 4 •Gran Turismo 4 Prologue^{EU} (different version) •Gran Turismo 4: Prologue Edition^{JP} (different version)	Polyphony Digital	Sony Computer Entertainment	2004-12-28^{AS, JP}	Yes ^{AS, JP, KO}	Yes	Yes
Gran Turismo Concept: 2001 Tokyo •Gran Turismo Concept 2002 Tokyo-Seoul^{KO} (different version 1) •Gran Turismo Concept 2002 Tokyo-Geneva^{EU} (different version 2)	Polyphony Digital	Sony Computer Entertainment	2002-01-01^{JP}	Yes	Yes	
Grand Prix Challenge	Infogrames Melbourne House	Infogrames	2002-11-22^{EU}	Yes	Yes	Yes
Grand Theft Auto III	DMA Design	Rockstar Games^{NA}, Take-Two Interactive^{PAL}, Capcom^{JP}	2001-10-22^{NA}	Yes	Yes	Yes
Grand Theft Auto: Liberty City Stories	Rockstar Leeds	Rockstar Games^{NA, PAL}, Capcom^{JP}	2006-06-06^{NA}	Yes	Yes	Yes
Grand Theft Auto: San Andreas	Rockstar North	Rockstar Games^{NA, PAL}, Capcom^{JP}	2004-10-26^{NA}	Yes	Yes	Yes
Grand Theft Auto: Vice City	Rockstar North	Rockstar Games^{NA, PAL}, Capcom^{JP}	2002-10-29^{NA}	Yes	Yes	Yes
Grand Theft Auto: Vice City Stories	Rockstar Leeds	Rockstar Games^{NA, PAL}, Capcom^{JP}	2007-03-05^{NA}	Yes	Yes	Yes
Grandia II	Game Arts	Ubisoft^{EU, NA}, Enix^{JP}	2002-01-28^{NA}	Yes	Yes	Yes
Grandia III	Game Arts	Square Enix	2005-08-04^{JP}	Yes		Yes
Grandia Xtreme	Game Arts	Enix	2002-01-31^{JP}	Yes		Yes
Gravity Games Bike: Street. Vert. Dirt.	Midway Games	Midway Games	2002-06-27^{NA}		Yes	Yes
The Great British Football Quiz	Liquid Games	Oxygen Games	2005-10-07^{EU}		Yes	
The Great Escape •Daidassou: The Great Escape^{JP}	Pivotal Games	SCi^{EU}, Gotham Games^{NA}, Marvelous Entertainment^{JP}	2003-08-29^{EU}	Yes	Yes	Yes
Green Green: Kane no Oto Dynamic	Success	Success	2003-04-24^{JP}	Yes		
Green Green: Kane no Oto Romantic	Success	Success	2003-04-24^{JP}	Yes		
Greg Hastings Tournament Paintball MAX'D	The Whole Experience	Activision	2006-09-26^{NA}			Yes
Gregory Horror Show •Gregory Horror Show: Soul Collector^{JP}	Capcom	Capcom	2003-08-07^{JP}	Yes	Yes	
Gretzky NHL 06	Page 44 Studios	Sony Computer Entertainment	2005-09-20^{NA}			Yes
Gretzky NHL 2005	Page 44 Studios	Sony Computer Entertainment	2004-11-09^{NA}			Yes
The Grim Adventures of Billy & Mandy	High Voltage Software	Midway Games	2006-09-25^{NA}			Yes
GrimGrimoire	Vanillaware	Nippon Ichi Software^{JP, KO}, NIS America^{NA}, Koei^{PAL}	2007-04-12^{JP}	Yes ^{JP, KO}	Yes	Yes
Grooverider: Slot Car Racing	King of the Jungle	Play It!	2005-01-28^{EU}		Yes	
Growlanser: Heritage of War •Growlanser V Generations^{JP}	Career Soft	Atlus^{JP, NA}, Rising Star Games^{EU}	2006-08-03^{JP}	Yes	Yes	Yes
Growlanser II: The Sense of Justice	Career Soft	Atlus	2001-07-26^{JP}	Yes		
Growlanser III: The Dual Darkness	Career Soft	Atlus	2001-12-06^{JP}	Yes		
Growlanser IV: Wayfarer of the Time	Career Soft	Atlus	2003-12-18^{JP}	Yes		
Growlanser IV: Wayfarer of the Time - Return (Note: stand-alone expansion for Growlanser IV: Wayfarer of the Time.)	Career Soft	Atlus	2005-03-10^{JP}	Yes		
Growlanser VI: Precarious World	Career Soft	Atlus	2007-06-21^{JP}	Yes		
G-Saviour	Atelier-Sai	Sunrise Interactive	2000-09-14^{JP}	Yes		
GT Racers	Aqua Pacific	Oxygen Games	2004-11-05^{EU}		Yes	
G-Taste Mahjong	Psikyo	X-Nauts	2003-04-24^{JP}	Yes		
GT-R 400	Kuju Entertainment	Midas Interactive Entertainment	2004-06-25^{EU}		Yes	
GT-R Touring	Kuju Entertainment	Midas Interactive Entertainment	2006-10-11^{EU}		Yes	
Guardian Angel	Vridge	Datam Polystar	2003-02-27^{JP}	Yes		
Guerrilla Strike	Phoenix Games	Phoenix Games	2006^{EU}		Yes	
Guilty Gear Isuka	Arc System Works	Sammy^{JP, NA}, 505 Game Street^{EU}	2004-07-29^{JP}	Yes	Yes	Yes
Guilty Gear X^{NA} •Guilty Gear X^{PAL} (different version) •Guilty Gear X Plus^{JP} (different version)	Arc System Works	Sammy^{NA, JP}, Virgin Interactive^{EU}	2001-09-30^{NA}	Yes	Yes	Yes
Guilty Gear X2 •Guilty Gear XX: The Midnight Carnival^{JP}•Guilty Gear X2 #Reload^{EU} (different version) •Guilty Gear XX: The Midnight Carnival #Reload^{JP} (different version)	Arc System Works	Sammy, Zoo Digital Publishing^{EU} (#Reloaded)	2002-12-12^{JP}	Yes	Yes	Yes
Guilty Gear XX: Accent Core^{JP, NA} •Guilty Gear XX: Accent Core Plus^{JP, NA, PAL} (different version) (Note: update for Guilty Gear X2.)	Arc System Works	Arc System Works^{JP}, Aksys Games^{NA}, PQube^{EU}	2007-05-31^{JP}	Yes	Yes	Yes
Guilty Gear XX: Slash (Note: update for Guilty Gear X2 #Reload.)	Arc System Works	Sega	2006-04-13^{JP}	Yes		
Guisard Revolution: Bokura wa Omoi o Mi ni Matou	KID	KID	2005-03-03^{JP}	Yes		
Guitar Hero	Harmonix	RedOctane	2005-11-07^{NA}		Yes	Yes
Guitar Hero 5	Budcat Creations	Activision	2009-09-01^{NA}		Yes	Yes
Guitar Hero: Aerosmith	Budcat Creations	Activision	2008-06-27^{EU}	Yes	Yes	Yes
Guitar Hero Encore: Rocks the 80s (Note: stand-alone expansion for Guitar Hero II.)	Harmonix	Activision	2007-07-24^{NA}		Yes	Yes
Guitar Hero II	Harmonix	RedOctane^{EU, NA}, Activision^{AU}	2006-11-07^{NA}		Yes	Yes
Guitar Hero III: Legends of Rock	Neversoft	RedOctane^{NA}, Activision^{JP, PAL}	2007-10-28^{NA}	Yes	Yes	Yes
Guitar Hero: Metallica	Neversoft	Activision	2009-04-14^{NA}		Yes	Yes
Guitar Hero Smash Hits •Guitar Hero: Greatest Hits^{PAL}	Beenox	Activision	2009-06-16^{NA}		Yes	Yes
Guitar Hero: Van Halen	Neversoft	Activision	2009-12-22^{NA}		Yes ^{AU}	Yes
Guitar Hero World Tour	Budcat Creations	Activision	2008-10-26^{NA}		Yes	Yes
GuitarFreaks & DrumMania: Masterpiece Gold	Konami	Konami	2007-03-08^{JP}	Yes		
GuitarFreaks & DrumMania: Masterpiece Silver	Konami	Konami	2006-08-31^{JP}	Yes		
GuitarFreaks 3rd Mix & DrumMania 2nd Mix	Konami	Konami	2000-12-07^{JP}	Yes		
GuitarFreaks V & DrumMania V	Konami	Konami	2006-03-16^{JP}	Yes		
GuitarFreaks V2 & DrumMania V2	Konami	Konami	2006-11-22^{JP}	Yes		
GuitarFreaks V3 & DrumMania V3	Konami	Konami	2007-10-04^{JP}	Yes		
Gumball 3000	Climax Studios	SCi Entertainment	2002-09-20^{EU}		Yes	
Gun	Neversoft	Activision	2005-11-08^{NA}		Yes	Yes
Gunbird Special Edition •Gunbird 1 & 2 ^{JP} •Gunbird Premium Package^{KO}	Neversoft	Activision	2004-02-19^{JP}	Yes ^{JP, KO}	Yes	
Guncom 2 •Death Crimson OX+^{JP}	Ecole Software	Ecole Software^{JP}, Play It!^{EU}	2003-11-27^{JP}	Yes	Yes	
Gundam Musou Special	Koei	Namco	2008-02-28^{JP}	Yes		
Gunfighter II: Revenge of Jesse James	Rebellion Developments	Ubisoft	2003-03-28^{EU}		Yes	
Gungrave	Red Entertainment	Sega	2002-07-18^{JP}	Yes	Yes	Yes
Gungrave: Overdose •Gungrave OD^{JP}	Red Entertainment	Red Entertainment^{JP}, Mastiff^{NA}, Play It!^{EU}	2004-03-04^{JP}	Yes	Yes	Yes
Gungriffon Blaze	Game Arts	Capcom^{JP}, Working Designs^{NA}, Swing! Deutschland^{EU}	2000-08-10^{JP}	Yes	Yes	Yes
Gunparade Orchestra: Ao no Shou	Alfa System	Sony Computer Entertainment	2006-07-20^{JP}	Yes		
Gunparade Orchestra: Midori no Shou	Alfa System	Sony Computer Entertainment	2006-03-30^{JP}	Yes		
Gunparade Orchestra: Shiro no Shou	Alfa System	Sony Computer Entertainment	2006-01-12^{JP}	Yes		
Gunslinger Girl Volume I	Marvelous Entertainment	Bandai	2004-04-08^{JP}	Yes		
Gunslinger Girl Volume II	Marvelous Entertainment	Bandai	2004-06-17^{JP}	Yes		
Gunslinger Girl Volume III	Marvelous Entertainment	Bandai	2004-08-19^{JP}	Yes		
Gunvari Collection + Time Crisis	Namco	Namco	2002-12-12^{JP}	Yes		
Guts da!! Mori no Ishimatsu	Aruze Corporation	Aruze Corporation	2005-03-31^{JP}	Yes		
The Guy Game	Topheavy Studios	Gathering of Developers	2004-08-31^{NA}			Yes
H2O+: Footprints in the Sand	Makura	Regista	2008-04-24^{JP}	Yes		
Habitrail Hamster Ball	Data Design Interactive	Phoenix Games	2005^{EU}		Yes	
Hachi-One Diver	SilverStar	SilverStar	2009-09-17^{JP}	Yes		
Hai-Shin 3	DigiCube	DigiCube	2002-12-19^{JP}	Yes		
Hajime no Ippo 2: Victorious Road	ESP Software	ESP Software	2004-01-29^{JP}	Yes		
Hajime no Ippo: Victorious Boxers - Championship Version (Note: update for Victorious Boxers: Ippo's Road to Glory.)	ESP Software	ESP Software	2002-06-27^{JP}	Yes		
The Hajimete no RPG •Simple 2000 Series Vol. 44: The Hajimete no RPG^{JP}	HuneX	D3 Publisher	2004-01-29^{JP}	Yes		
Hakarena Heart: Kimi ga Tame ni Kagayaki o	Russel	Russel	2007-12-13^{JP}	Yes		
Hakuouki	Idea Factory	Idea Factory	2008-09-18^{JP}	Yes		
Hakuouki: Reimeiroku	Idea Factory	Idea Factory	2010-10-28^{JP}	Yes		
Hakuouki: Zuisouroku (Note: stand-alone expansion for Hakuouki.)	Idea Factory	Idea Factory	2009-08-27^{JP}	Yes		
Hakushaku to Yousei: Yume to Kizuna ni Omoi Hasete	5pb	5pb	2009-04-30^{JP}	Yes		
Half-Life	Gearbox Software	Sierra Entertainment	2001-11-11^{NA}		Yes	Yes
Hametsu no Mars	Design Factory	Idea Factory	2005-05-26^{JP}	Yes		
Hamster Heroes	Data Design Interactive	Metro3D	2005-07-15^{EU}		Yes	
Hana to Otome ni Shukufuku o: Harukaze no Okurimono	Alchemist	Alchemist	2010-07-08^{JP}	Yes		
Hana to Taiyou to Ame to	Grasshopper Manufacture	Victor Interactive Software	2001-05-02^{JP}	Yes		
Hanabi Hyakkei	Aruze Corporation	Nippon Amuse	2003-10-30^{JP}	Yes		
Hanabi Shokunin Ninarou 2	Mahou	Mahou	2003-06-26^{JP}	Yes		
Hanafuda •SuperLite 2000 Table: Hanafuda^{JP}	Success	Success	2004-05-13^{JP}	Yes		
Hanakisou	HaccaWorks	Prototype	2006-07-06^{JP}	Yes		
The Hanasou Eigo no Tabi •Simple 2000 Series Vol. 76: The Hanasou Eigo no Tabi^{JP}	HuneX	D3 Publisher	2005-04-14^{JP}	Yes		
The Hanasou Kankokugo no Tabi •Simple 2000 Series Vol. 77: The Hanasou Kankokugo no Tabi^{JP}	HuneX	D3 Publisher	2005-04-14^{JP}	Yes		
Hanayoi Romanesque: Ai to Kanashimi Sore wa Kimi no Tame no Aria	Vridge	Marvelous Entertainment	2008-05-29^{JP}	Yes		
Hanjuku Eiyuu 4: 7-Jin no Hanjuku Eiyuu	Square Enix	Square Enix	2005-05-26^{JP}	Yes		
Hanjuku Eiyuu Tai 3D	Square Enix	Square Enix	2003-06-26^{JP}	Yes		
Hannspree Ten Kate Honda SBK •SBK-07 Superbike World Championship^{EU} •SBK: Superbike World Championship 2007^{AU}	Milestone srl	Black Bean Games^{PAL}, Valcon Games^{NA}	2007-05-18^{EU}		Yes	Yes
Hansel & Gretel	Phoenix Games	Phoenix Games	2006-11-24^{EU}		Yes	
Hanuman: Boy Warrior	Aurona	Sony Computer Entertainment Europe	2009-03-25^{IN}		Yes ^{IN}	
Happiness! De-Lucks	Marvelous Entertainment	Marvelous Entertainment	2007-01-25^{JP}	Yes		
Happy Breeding: Cheerful Party	PrincessSoft	PrincessSoft	2003-02-27^{JP}	Yes		
Happy Feet	A2M	Midway Games	2006-11-14^{NA}		Yes	Yes
Happy! Happy!! Boarders in Hokkaido	Racjin	Atlus	2000-12-14^{JP}	Yes		
Hard Hitter Tennis •Magical Sports: Hard Hitter 2^{JP} •Hard Hitter 2^{EU}	Magical Company	Mahou^{JP}, Atlus^{NA}, Midas Interactive Entertainment^{EU}	2002-02-07^{JP}	Yes	Yes	Yes
Hard Knock High •Simple 2000 Series Vol. 107: The Honoo no Kakutou Banchou^{JP}	Opus	D3 Publisher^{JP}, Essential Games^{EU}	2006-09-14^{JP}	Yes	Yes	
Hard Rock Casino	FarSight Studios	Crave Entertainment^{NA}, Oxygen Games^{PAL}	2006-11-27^{NA}		Yes	Yes
Hardware: Online Arena •Gangcheol Gigap Sadan: Online Battlefield^{KO}	London Studio	Sony Computer Entertainment Europe	2003-11-07^{EU}	Yes ^{KO}	Yes	
Harley-Davidson Motorcycles: Race to the Rally	Fun Labs	Activision	2006-11-27^{NA}		Yes	Yes
Harry Potter and the Chamber of Secrets •Harry Potter to Himitsu no Heya^{JP}	Eurocom	Electronic Arts	2002-11-05^{NA}	Yes	Yes	Yes
Harry Potter and the Goblet of Fire	EA UK	Electronic Arts	2005-11-08^{NA}	Yes ^{AS, KO}	Yes	Yes
Harry Potter and the Half-Blood Prince	EA Bright Light	Electronic Arts	2009-06-30^{NA}		Yes	Yes
Harry Potter and the Order of the Phoenix •Harry Potter to Fushichou no Kishidan^{JP}	Electronic Arts	Electronic Arts	2007-06-25^{NA}	Yes ^{JP, KO}	Yes	Yes
Harry Potter and the Prisoner of Azkaban •Harry Potter to Azkaban no Shuujin^{JP}	Electronic Arts	Electronic Arts	2004-05-29^{EU}	Yes	Yes	Yes
Harry Potter and the Sorcerer's Stone •Harry Potter and the Philosopher's Stone^{EU} •Harry Potter to Kenja no Ishi^{JP}	Warthog	Electronic Arts	2003-12-09^{NA}	Yes	Yes	Yes
Harry Potter: Quidditch World Cup	EA UK	Electronic Arts	2003-10-28^{NA}	Yes	Yes	Yes
Haru no Ashioto: Step of Spring	Alchemist	Alchemist	2006-04-06^{JP}	Yes		
Harukanaru Toki no Naka de 2 •Harukanaru Toki no Naka de 2 + 1^{JP}	Koei	Koei	2002-02-28^{JP}	Yes		
Harukanaru Toki no Naka de 3	Koei	Koei	2004-12-22^{JP}	Yes		
Harukanaru Toki no Naka de 3: Izayoiki (Note: stand-alone expansion for Harukanaru Toki no Naka de 3.)	Koei	Koei	2005-09-22^{JP}	Yes		
Harukanaru Toki no Naka de 3: Unmei no Labyrinth (Note: stand-alone expansion for Harukanaru Toki no Naka de 3.)	Koei	Koei	2006-03-23^{JP}	Yes		
Harukanaru Toki no Naka de 4	Koei	Koei	2008-06-19^{JP}	Yes		
Harukanaru Toki no Naka de: Hachiyoushou	Koei	Koei	2005-04-01^{JP}	Yes		
Harukanaru Toki no Naka de: Maihitoyo	Koei	Koei	2006-09-21^{JP}	Yes		
Harukanaru Toki no Naka de: Yumenoukihashi Special	Koei	Koei	2009-01-29^{JP}	Yes		
Harvest Moon: A Wonderful Life •Bokujou Monogatari: Oh! Wonderful Life^{JP}	Tose	Marvelous Entertainment^{JP}, Natsume Inc.^{NA}, 505 Game Street^{EU}	2004-11-11^{JP}	Yes	Yes	Yes
Harvest Moon: Save the Homeland •Bokujou Monogatari 3: Heart ni Hi o Tsukete^{JP}	Victor Interactive Software	Victor Interactive Software^{JP}, Natsume Inc.^{NA}	2001-11-22^{NA}	Yes		Yes
Harvey Birdman: Attorney at Law	High Voltage Software	Capcom	2008-01-08^{NA}			Yes
Hasbro Family Game Night	EA Bright Light	Electronic Arts	2008-11-11^{NA}		Yes	Yes
Hatsukoi: First Kiss	PrincessSoft	PrincessSoft	2005-06-30^{JP}	Yes		
The Haunted Mansion	High Voltage Software	TDK Mediactive^{NA/EU}, Yuke's^{JP}	2003-10-14^{NA}	Yes	Yes	Yes
Haunting Ground •Demento^{JP}	Capcom	Capcom	2005-04-21^{JP}	Yes	Yes	Yes
Haven: Call of the King	Traveller's Tales	Midway Games	2002-11-17^{NA}		Yes	Yes
Hawk-Kawasaki Racing	Infusion Games	Midas Interactive Entertainment	2006-10-11^{EU}		Yes	
Hayarigami 2: Keishichou Kaii Jiken File	Nippon Ichi Software	Nippon Ichi Software	2007-11-15^{JP}	Yes		
Hayarigami: Keishichou Kaii Jiken File	Nippon Ichi Software	Nippon Ichi Software	2004-08-05^{JP}	Yes		
Hayarigami Revenge: Keishichou Kaii Jiken File (Note: update for Hayarigami: Keishichou Kaii Jiken File.)	Nippon Ichi Software	Nippon Ichi Software	2005-07-14^{JP}	Yes		
Headhunter	Amuze	Sony Computer Entertainment Europe^{EU}, Acclaim Entertainment^{NA}	2002-03-22^{EU}		Yes	Yes
Headhunter: Redemption	Amuze	Sega	2004-08-27^{EU}		Yes	Yes
Heart no Kuni no Alice: Wonderful Wonder World	Quinrose	Prototype	2008-09-18^{JP}	Yes		
Heartbeat Boxing •Simple 2000 Ultimate Series Vol. 6: Love * Upper!^{JP}	Tamsoft	D3 Publisher^{JP}, Agetec^{EU}	2003-02-27^{JP}	Yes	Yes	
Heatseeker	IR Gurus	Codemasters	2007-03-30^{EU}		Yes	Yes
Heavenly Guardian •Legend of Sayuki^{EU} •Yukinko Daisenpuu: Saiyuki to Koyuki no Hie Hie Daisoudou^{JP}	Starfish SD	Starfish SD^{JP}, UFO Interactive Games^{NA}, 505 Game Street^{EU}	2008-02-26^{NA}	Yes	Yes	Yes
Heavy Metal Thunder	Media Vision	Square Enix	2005-09-01^{JP}	Yes		
Heisei Bakutoden •SuperLite 2000 Puzzle: Heisei Bakutoden^{JP}	Kouyousha	Success	2004-11-11^{JP}	Yes		
Hello Kitty: Minna de Sugoroku •Simple 2000 Hello Kitty Series Vol. 2: Minna de Sugoroku^{JP}	Atelier Double	D3 Publisher	2002-11-14^{JP}	Yes		
Hello Kitty: Roller Rescue •Hello Kitty no PikoPiko Daisakusen^{JP}	XPEC Entertainment	Hamster^{JP}, Xplosiv^{PAL}	2005-04-28^{JP}	Yes	Yes	
Hello Kitty: Starlight Puzzle •Simple 2000 Hello Kitty Series Vol. 1: Starlight Puzzle^{JP}	Atelier Double	D3 Publisher	2002-11-14^{JP}	Yes		
Heracles: Battle with the Gods	Neko Entertainment	Midas Interactive Entertainment	2006-03-10^{EU}		Yes	
Heracles: Chariot Racing	Neko Entertainment	Midas Interactive Entertainment	2007-06-27^{EU}		Yes	
Herdy Gerdy	Core Design	Eidos Interactive	2002-02-22^{EU}	Yes	Yes	Yes
Hermina to Culus	Gust	Gust	2001-12-20^{JP}	Yes		
Heroes of Might and Magic: Quest for the Dragon Bone Staff	New World Computing	3DO	2001-04-18^{NA}		Yes	Yes
Heroes of the Pacific	Transmission Games	Codemasters^{EU}, Ubisoft^{NA}	2005-09-23^{EU}		Yes	Yes
Hidden Invasion	Toka	Swing! Deutschland^{EU}, Conspiracy Entertainment^{NA}	2001-12-07^{EU}		Yes	Yes
Higanbana	Sammy	Sammy	2002-12-26^{JP}	Yes		
High Heat Major League Baseball 2002	3DO	3DO	2001-03-27^{NA}			Yes
High Heat Major League Baseball 2003	3DO	3DO	2002-02-09^{NA}	Yes	Yes	Yes
High Heat Major League Baseball 2004	3DO	3DO	2003-02-20^{NA}			Yes
High Rollers Casino	Virtual Toys	Mud Duck Productions	2004-11-10^{NA}			Yes
High School Musical 3: Senior Year DANCE!	Page 44 Studios	Disney Interactive Studios	2008-10-28^{NA}		Yes	Yes
High School Musical: Sing It!	Artificial Mind and Movement	Disney Interactive Studios	2007-10-30^{NA}		Yes	Yes
Higurashi no Naku Koro ni Matsuri	07th Expansion	Alchemist	2007-02-22^{JP}	Yes		
Higurashi no Naku Koro ni Matsuri: Kakera Asobi (Note: expansion for Higurashi no Naku Koro ni Matsuri.)	07th Expansion	Alchemist	2007-12-20^{JP}	Yes		
Hiiro no Kakera •Hiiro no Kakera: Aizouban^{JP}	Design Factory	Idea Factory	2006-07-06^{JP}	Yes		
Hiiro no Kakera: Ano Sora no Shita de (Note: stand-alone expansion for Hiiro no Kakera.)	Design Factory	Idea Factory	2007-02-15^{JP}	Yes		
Hiiro no Kakera: Shin Tamayori Hime Denshou	Design Factory	Idea Factory	2009-10-01^{JP}	Yes		
Himehibi: New Princess Days!! Zoku! Ni-Gakki	Takuyo	Takuyo	2009-06-25^{JP}	Yes		
HimeHibi: Princess Days	Takuyo	Takuyo	2006-12-28^{JP}	Yes		
Hissatsu Pachinko Evolution 2: Osomatsu-Kun	SunSoft	SunSoft	2006-03-02^{JP}	Yes		
Hissatsu Pachinko Station V: Honoo no Bakushougun	SunSoft	SunSoft	2001-06-07^{JP}	Yes		
Hissatsu Pachinko Station V10	SunSoft	SunSoft	2005-03-17^{JP}	Yes		
Hissatsu Pachinko Station V11	SunSoft	SunSoft	2005-09-29^{JP}	Yes		
Hissatsu Pachinko Station V2	SunSoft	SunSoft	2001-07-12^{JP}	Yes		
Hissatsu Pachinko Station V3	SunSoft	SunSoft	2002-04-25^{JP}	Yes		
Hissatsu Pachinko Station V4	SunSoft	SunSoft	2002-08-22^{JP}	Yes		
Hissatsu Pachinko Station V5	SunSoft	SunSoft	2002-10-31^{JP}	Yes		
Hissatsu Pachinko Station V6	SunSoft	SunSoft	2002-12-05^{JP}	Yes		
Hissatsu Pachinko Station V7	SunSoft	SunSoft	2003-05-22^{JP}	Yes		
Hissatsu Pachinko Station V8	SunSoft	SunSoft	2003-11-20^{JP}	Yes		
Hissatsu Pachinko Station V9: Osomatsu-kun	SunSoft	SunSoft	2005-02-24^{JP}	Yes		
Hissatsu Pachi-Slot Evolution: Ninja Hattori-Kun V	SunSoft	SunSoft	2005-12-22^{JP}	Yes		
Hissatsu Ura-Kagyou	Lightweight	Genki	2005-09-22^{JP}	Yes		
Hisshou Pachinko Kouryaku Series Vol. 1: CR Shinseiki Evangelion	D3 Publisher	D3 Publisher	2005-10-20^{JP}	Yes		
Hisshou Pachinko*Pachi-Slot Kouryaku Series Vol. 10: CR Shinseiki Evangelion: Kiseki no Kachi	D3 Publisher	D3 Publisher	2007-06-07^{JP}	Yes		
Hisshou Pachinko*Pachi-Slot Kouryaku Series Vol. 11: Shinseiki Evangelion – Magokoro o, Kimi ni	D3 Publisher	D3 Publisher	2007-09-27^{JP}	Yes		
Hisshou Pachinko*Pachi-Slot Kouryaku Series Vol. 12: CR Shinseiki Evangelion – Shito, Futatabi	D3 Publisher	D3 Publisher	2008-06-26^{JP}	Yes		
Hisshou Pachinko*Pachi-Slot Kouryaku Series Vol. 13: Shinseiki Evangelion – Yakusoku no Toki	D3 Publisher	D3 Publisher	2008-12-18^{JP}	Yes		
Hisshou Pachinko*Pachi-Slot Kouryaku Series Vol. 14: CR Shinseiki Evangelion: Saigo no Mono	D3 Publisher	D3 Publisher	2009-07-30^{JP}	Yes		
Hisshou Pachinko*Pachi-Slot Kouryaku Series Vol. 2: Bomber Powerful & Yume Yume World DX	D3 Publisher	D3 Publisher	2006-01-12^{JP}	Yes		
Hisshou Pachinko*Pachi-Slot Kouryaku Series Vol. 3: CR Marilyn Monroe	D3 Publisher	D3 Publisher	2006-02-23^{JP}	Yes		
Hisshou Pachinko*Pachi-Slot Kouryaku Series Vol. 4: CR Ashita Gaarusa Yoshimoto World	D3 Publisher	D3 Publisher	2006-05-25^{JP}	Yes		
Hisshou Pachinko*Pachi-Slot Kouryaku Series Vol. 5: CR Shinseiki Evangelion 2nd Impact * Pachi-Slot Shinseiki Evangelion	D3 Publisher	D3 Publisher	2006-06-08^{JP}	Yes		
Hisshou Pachinko*Pachi-Slot Kouryaku Series Vol. 6: 7Cafe Keishikina Bomber Powerful 2	D3 Publisher	D3 Publisher	2006-08-03^{JP}	Yes		
Hisshou Pachinko*Pachi-Slot Kouryaku Series Vol. 7: CR Fever Powerful Zero	D3 Publisher	D3 Publisher	2006-10-26^{JP}	Yes		
Hisshou Pachinko*Pachi-Slot Kouryoku Series Vol. 8: CR Matsuura Aya	D3 Publisher	D3 Publisher	2006-11-30^{JP}	Yes		
Hisshou Pachinko*Pachi-Slot Kouryoku Series Vol. 9: CR Fever Captain Harlock	D3 Publisher	D3 Publisher	2007-03-08^{JP}	Yes		
The History Channel: Battle for the Pacific	Sand Grain Studios	Activision	2007-12-04^{NA}		Yes	Yes
The History Channel: Civil War - A Nation Divided	Cauldron	Activision	2006-11-07^{NA}			Yes
The History Channel: Civil War: Secret Missions	Cauldron	Activision	2008-11-04^{NA}			Yes
The History Channel: Great Battles of Rome	Slitherine	Black Bean Games	2007-06-08^{EU}		Yes	
Hisui no Shizuku: Hiiro no Kakera 2	Design Factory	Idea Factory	2007-08-09^{JP}	Yes		
Hitman 2: Silent Assassin	IO Interactive	Eidos Interactive	2002-10-01^{NA}	Yes	Yes	Yes
Hitman: Blood Money	IO Interactive	Eidos Interactive	2006-05-26^{EU}		Yes	Yes
Hitman: Contracts	IO Interactive	Eidos Interactive	2004-04-20^{NA}	Yes	Yes	Yes
The Hobbit •Hobbit no Bouken: Lord of the Rings Hajimari no Monogatari^{JP}	Inevitable Entertainment	Sierra Entertainment^{EU, NA}, Konami^{JP}	2003-11-11^{NA}	Yes	Yes	Yes
Hokenshitsu e Youkoso	PrincessSoft	PrincessSoft	2006-11-30^{JP}	Yes		
Hokkahoka Sentou	Tecmo	Tecmo	2002-07-25^{JP}	Yes		
Hokuto no Ken	Arc System Works	Sega	2007-03-27^{JP}	Yes		
Home Alone	Coyote Console	Blast! Entertainment Ltd	2006-11-29^{EU}		Yes	
Home Maid: Owari no Tachi	PrincessSoft	PrincessSoft	2005-06-02^{JP}	Yes		
Homerun •Magical Sports 2001 Pro Yakyuu^{JP}	Mahou	Mahou	2001-08-16^{JP}	Yes	Yes	
Homura	Skonec	Taito^{JP}, 505 Game Street^{EU}	2005-12-01^{JP}	Yes	Yes	
Honkakuha 2000 Series: 3D Mahjong + Janpai Tori	Magnolia	Magnolia	2006-11-16^{JP}	Yes		
Honkakuteki Pachinko Jikki Kouryaku Series: Milky Bar and Kirakuin	Unbalance	Unbalance	2001-07-19^{JP}	Yes		
Honoo no Takuhaibin	Success	Success	2006-10-19^{JP}	Yes		
Hooligan: Kimi no Naka no Yuuki	Frontwing	Pacific Century Cyber Works	2002-08-29^{JP}	Yes		
Hoppie	Phoenix Games	Phoenix Games	2006^{EU}		Yes	
Horse Breaker	Koei/Inis	Koei	2001-08-02^{JP}	Yes		
Horsez •Pippa Funnell: Take the Reins^{UK} •Alexandra Ledermann: School of Champions^{FR}	MTO	Ubisoft	2006-10-27^{UK}		Yes	Yes
Hoshi Furu	Piacci	Piacci	2008-07-31^{JP}	Yes		
Hoshi no Furu Toki	Design Factory	Idea Factory	2005-09-22^{JP}	Yes		
Hoshigari Empusa	Takuyo	Takuyo	2008-04-17^{JP}	Yes		
Hoshiiro no Okurimono	Takuyo	Takuyo	2007-11-08^{JP}	Yes		
Hot Shots Golf 3 •Minna no Golf 3^{JP}	Clap Hanz	Sony Computer Entertainment	2001-07-26^{JP}	Yes		Yes
Hot Shots Golf Fore! •Everybody's Golf^{EU} •Minna no Golf 4^{JP} •Everybody's Golf 4^{KO}	Clap Hanz	Sony Computer Entertainment	2003-11-27^{JP}	Yes ^{JP, KO}	Yes	Yes
Hot Shots Golf Online •Minna no Golf Online^{JP}	Clap Hanz	Sony Computer Entertainment	2003-06-12^{JP}	Yes		
Hot Shots Tennis •Everybody's Tennis^{PAL} •Minna no Tennis^{JP}	Clap Hanz	Sony Computer Entertainment	2006-09-14^{JP}	Yes ^{JP, KO}	Yes	Yes
Hot Wheels: Beat That!	Eutechnyx	Activision	2007-09-25^{NA}		Yes	Yes
Hot Wheels: Stunt Track Challenge	Climax Group	THQ	2004-11-10^{NA}		Yes	Yes
Hot Wheels Velocity X	Beyond Games	THQ	2002-11-11^{NA}		Yes	Yes
Hot Wheels World Race	Climax Group	THQ	2003-10-29^{NA}		Yes	Yes
Houkago no Love Beat •Simple 2000 Ultimate Series Vol. 27: Houkago no Love Beat^{JP}	HuneX	D3 Publisher	2004-06-10^{JP}	Yes		
Houkago wa Gin no Shirabe	Fupac	Dimple Entertainment	2008-02-28^{JP}	Yes		
Houshin Engi 2	Koei	Koei	2002-06-27^{JP}	Yes		
Hresvelgr	Gust	Gust	2000-06-22^{JP}	Yes		
HSX HyperSonic.Xtreme •G-Surfers^{EU}	Blade Interactive	Midas Interactive Entertainment^{EU}, Majesco^{NA}	2002-01-25^{EU}		Yes	Yes
Hudson Selection Vol. 3: PC Genjin	Hudson Soft	Hudson Soft	2003-12-04^{JP}	Yes		
Hudson Selection Vol. 4: Takahashi Meijin no Bouken Jima	Hudson Soft	Hudson Soft	2003-12-18^{JP}	Yes		
Hugo: Bukkazoom!	ITE Media	ITE Media	2003-11-28^{EU}		Yes	
Hugo: Cannon Cruise	ITE Media	ITE Media	2004-11-03^{EU}		Yes	
Hugo: Magic In The Troll Woods	Attractive Games	Rough Trade	2009-11-27^{EU}		Yes	
Hulk	Radical Entertainment	Universal Interactive^{EU, NA}, CyberFront^{JP}	2003-05-28^{NA}	Yes	Yes	Yes
Hummer Badlands	Eutechnyx	Global Star Software^{NA}, 2K Games^{EU}	2006-04-13^{NA}		Yes	Yes
Hungry Ghosts	Deep Space	Sony Computer Entertainment	2003-07-31^{JP}	Yes		
Hunter: The Reckoning: Wayward	High Voltage Software	Vivendi Universal Games	2003-09-09^{NA}		Yes	Yes
Hunter X Hunter: Ryumyaku no Saidan	Konami	Konami	2001-08-30^{JP}	Yes		
The Hustle: Detroit Streets	Blade Interactive	Activision	2006-04-26^{NA}			Yes
Hyakko: Yorozuya Jikenbo!	5pb	5pb	2009-04-09^{JP}	Yes		
Hype: The Time Quest	Ubisoft Montreal	Ubisoft	2002-09-20^{EU}		Yes	
Hyper Street Fighter II: The Anniversary Edition	Capcom	Capcom	2003-12-18^{JP}	Yes	Yes	
I Love Baseball: Pro Yakyuu o Koyonaku Aisuru Hitotachi e	Sammy	Sammy	2004-07-29^{JP}	Yes		
Ibara	Cave	Taito	2006-02-23^{JP}	Yes		
Ice Age 2: The Meltdown	Eurocom	Vivendi Universal Games	2006-03-14^{NA}	Yes	Yes	Yes
Ice Age: Dawn of the Dinosaurs •Ice Age 3: Dawn of the Dinosaurs^{PAL}	Eurocom	Activision	2009-06-24^{AU}		Yes	Yes
Ichigeki Sacchuu!! HoiHoi-San	Konami	Konami	2003-11-27^{JP}	Yes		
Ichigo 100% Strawberry Diary	Alpha Unit	Tomy	2005-02-10^{JP}	Yes		
Ichigo Mashimaro	ASCII Media Works	ASCII Media Works	2005-08-11^{JP}	Yes		
Ico	Team Ico	Sony Computer Entertainment	2001-09-24^{NA}	Yes	Yes	Yes
Ide Yosuke no Mahjong Kazoku 2	Opus	SETA Corporation	2000-10-12^{JP}	Yes		
Idol Janshi R: Janguru Project	Pacific Century Cyber Works	Pacific Century Cyber Works	2002-12-19^{JP}	Yes		
Idol Janshi Suchie-Pai IV	Jaleco Entertainment	Jaleco Entertainment	2007-10-11^{JP}	Yes		
Igo •SuperLite 2000 Table: Igo^{JP}	Success	Success	2003-07-31^{JP}	Yes		
The Igo •Simple 2000 Honkaku Shikou Series Vol. 2: The Igo^{JP}	Yuki	D3 Publisher	2002-06-25^{JP}	Yes		
Igo 4 •Value 2000 Series: Igo 4^{JP}	Magnolia	Magnolia	2004-07-22^{JP}	Yes		
IGPX: Immortal Grand Prix	Namco Bandai Games	Bandai^{JP}, Namco Bandai Games^{NA}	2006-03-30^{JP}	Yes		Yes
IHRA Drag Racing 2	Bethesda Softworks	Bethesda Softworks	2002-12-09^{NA}			Yes
IHRA Drag Racing: Sportsman Edition	Bethesda Softworks	Bethesda Softworks	2006-06-13^{NA}			Yes
IHRA Professional Drag Racing 2005	Bethesda Softworks	Bethesda Softworks	2004-11-09^{NA}			Yes
Iinazuke	PrincessSoft	PrincessSoft	2007-04-26^{JP}	Yes		
Ikki Tousen: Shining Dragon	Marvelous Entertainment	Marvelous Entertainment	2007-07-26^{JP}	Yes		
Ikuze! Onsen Takkyuu!!	Psikyo	Psikyo	2000-12-21^{JP}	Yes		
Impossible Mission	System 3	System 3	2007-08-31^{EU}		Yes	
In the Groove	Roxor Games	Red Octane	2005-06-08^{NA}			Yes
Inaka Kurashi: Nan no Shima no Monogatari	Polygon Magic	Victor Interactive Software	2002-09-12^{JP}	Yes		
The Incredible Hulk	Edge of Reality	Sega	2008-06-05^{NA}		Yes	Yes
The Incredible Hulk: Ultimate Destruction	Radical Entertainment	Vivendi Universal Games	2005-08-23^{NA}		Yes	Yes
The Incredibles	Heavy Iron Studios	THQ^{EU, NA}, D3 Publisher^{JP}	2004-10-31^{NA}	Yes	Yes	Yes
The Incredibles: Rise of the Underminer	Heavy Iron Studios	THQ^{EU, NA}, Sega^{JP}	2005-11-01^{NA}	Yes	Yes	Yes
Indiana Jones and the Emperor's Tomb	The Collective	LucasArts	2003-06-26^{NA}		Yes	Yes
Indiana Jones and the Staff of Kings	Artificial Mind and Movement	LucasArts	2009-06-09^{NA}		Yes	Yes
Indigo Prophecy •Fahrenheit^{JP, PAL}	Quantic Dream	Atari	2005-09-16^{EU}	Yes ^{JP, KO}	Yes	Yes
IndyCar Series	Brain in a Jar	Codemasters	2003-05-21^{NA}		Yes	Yes
IndyCar Series 2005	Codemasters	Codemasters	2004-06-24^{EU}		Yes	
I-Ninja	Argonaut Games	Namco Hometek^{NA}, Sony Computer Entertainment^{EU}	2003-11-18^{NA}		Yes	Yes
Initial D - Takahashi Ryosuke no Typing Saisoku Riron •Kashiramoji D: Takahashi Ryosuke no Typing Saisoku Riron^{JP}	e Frontier	SunSoft	2001-10-04^{JP}	Yes		
Initial D Special Stage	Sega Rosso	Sega	2003-06-26^{JP}	Yes		
Innocent Life: A Futuristic Harvest Moon	ArtePiazza	Marvelous Entertainment^{JP}, Natsume Inc.^{NA}	2007-03-29^{JP}	Yes		Yes
Inspector Gadget: Mad Robots Invasion	Silmarils	Light and Shadow Production	2003^{EU}		Yes	
Intellivision Lives!	Realtime Associates	Crave Entertainment^{NA}, Play It!^{EU}	2003-11-20^{NA}		Yes	Yes
Interlude	Longshot	Crave Entertainment^{NA}, Play It!^{EU}	2003-10-09^{JP}	Yes		
International Cricket Captain III	Empire Interactive	Empire Interactive	2007-11-16^{PAL}		Yes	
International Cue Club 2	Midas Interactive Entertainment	Midas Interactive Entertainment	2005-09-02^{PAL}		Yes	
International Golf Pro	Aqua Pacific	Oxygen Games	2004-04-08^{EU}		Yes	
International Pool Championship	Play It!	Play It!	2003-11-28^{EU}		Yes	
International Snooker Championship	Play It!	Play It!	2004-01-16^{EU}		Yes	
International Super Karts	Midas Interactive Entertainment	Midas Interactive Entertainment	2005-09-02^{EU}		Yes	
International Superstar Soccer •Jikkyou World Soccer 2000^{JP}	Konami	Konami	2000-08-03^{JP}	Yes	Yes	
International Superstar Soccer 2	Konami	Konami	2002-05-17^{EU}	Yes ^{KO}	Yes	
International Superstar Soccer 3	Konami	Konami	2003-03-28^{EU}		Yes	
International Tennis Pro	Aqua Pacific	Midas Interactive Entertainment	2007-03-09^{EU}		Yes	
Internet Igo	Success	Success	2002-06-13^{JP}	Yes		
Internet Mahjong	Success	Success	2002-06-13^{JP}	Yes		
Internet Othello	Success	Success	2002-06-13^{JP}	Yes		
Internet Shogi	Success	Success	2002-06-13^{JP}	Yes		
InuYasha: Feudal Combat •Inuyasha: Okugi Ranbu^{JP}	Eighting	Bandai	2005-06-16^{JP}	Yes		Yes
InuYasha: The Secret of the Cursed Mask •Inuyasha: Juuso no Kamen^{JP}	Kamui	Bandai	2004-03-18^{JP}	Yes		Yes
I/O	Regista	GN Software	2006-01-26^{JP}	Yes		
I.Q. Remix+: Intelligent Qube	Sugar and Rockets	Sony Computer Entertainment	2000-03-23^{JP}	Yes		
Iridium Runners	Plystos Entertainment	SouthPeak Games	2008-02-20^{NA}		Yes	Yes
Iris	KID	KID	2003-02-27^{JP}	Yes		
Iron Aces 2: Birds of Prey •Kuusen^{JP}	Opera House	Kadokawa Games^{JP}, Xicat Interactive^{EU}	2001-02-22^{JP}	Yes	Yes	
Iron Chef	Phoenix Games	Phoenix Games	2007-12-01^{JP}		Yes	
Iron Man	Artificial Mind and Movement	Sega	2008-05-02^{NA}		Yes	Yes
Iron Sea •Simple 2000 Series Vol. 51: The Senkan^{JP}	Tamsoft	D3 Publisher^{JP}, 505 Game Street^{EU}	2004-05-20^{JP}	Yes	Yes	
I's Pure	Regista	Takara Tomy	2006-11-09^{JP}	Yes		
Ishikura Noboru no Igo Kouza: Chuukyuuhen	Unbalance	Unbalance	2003-10-23^{JP}	Yes		
Ishikura Noboru no Igo Kouza: Joukyuuhen	Unbalance	Unbalance	2004-01-15^{JP}	Yes		
Ishikura Noboru no Igo Kouza: Nyuumonhen	Unbalance	Unbalance	2003-09-25^{JP}	Yes		
Island Xtreme Stunts	Silicon Dreams Studio	Electronic Arts, Lego Interactive	2002-09-22^{NA}		Yes	Yes
Itadaki Street 3: Okumanchouja ni Shite Ageru!	Crea-Tech	Enix Corporation	2002-02-28^{JP}	Yes		
The Italian Job	Climax Studios	Eidos Interactive	2003-06-24^{NA}		Yes	Yes
Itsuka, Todoku, Ano Sora ni	Russel Corporation	Russel Corporation	2007-10-25^{JP}	Yes		
Izayoi Renka	Chise	Kaga Tech	2004-03-18^{JP}	Yes		
Izumo 2	Studio e.go!	GN Software	2006-04-27^{JP}	Yes		
Izumo 2: Gakuen Kyousoukyoku	Studio e.go!	GN Software	2008-01-31^{JP}	Yes		
Izumo Complete	Studio e.go!	GN Software	2005-02-03^{JP}	Yes		
Izumo Zero	Studio e.go!	Success	2007-07-12^{JP}	Yes		
Jackass: The Game	Sidhe Interactive	Empire Interactive	2007-09-24^{NA}		Yes	Yes
Jacked •Simple 2000 Series Vol. 111: The Itadaki Rider^{JP}	Sproing	Xplosiv^{EU}, Studio9^{KO}, D3 Publisher^{JP}	2003-11-23^{EU}	Yes ^{JP, KO}	Yes	
Jackie Chan Adventures	Atomic Planet Entertainment	Sony Computer Entertainment	2004-10-01^{EU}		Yes	
Jackpot Madness	Dorasu	505 Game Street	2006^{EU}		Yes	
Jade Cocoon 2 •Tamamayu Monogatari 2^{JP}	Genki	Genki^{JP}, Ubisoft^{EU, NA}	2001-08-30^{JP}	Yes	Yes	Yes
Jak 3	Naughty Dog	Sony Computer Entertainment	2004-11-09^{NA}	Yes ^{KO}	Yes	Yes
Jak and Daxter: The Lost Frontier	High Impact Games	Sony Computer Entertainment	2009-11-03^{NA}		Yes	Yes
Jak and Daxter: The Precursor Legacy	Naughty Dog	Sony Computer Entertainment	2001-12-03^{NA}	Yes ^{JP, KO}	Yes	Yes
Jak II •Jak II: Renegade^{EU} •Jak II: El Renegado^{ES} •Jak and Daxter II^{JP}	Naughty Dog	Sony Computer Entertainment	2003-10-14^{NA}	Yes ^{JP, KO}	Yes	Yes
Jak X: Combat Racing	Naughty Dog	Sony Computer Entertainment	2005-10-18^{NA}		Yes	Yes
James Cameron's Dark Angel	Radical Entertainment	Sierra Entertainment	2002-11-18^{NA}		Yes	Yes
James Pond: Codename Robocod	Gameware Development	Play It!	2006-07-28^{EU}		Yes	
Jan Sangoku Musou	Omega Force	Koei	2006-03-23^{JP}	Yes		
Jaws Unleashed	Appaloosa Interactive	Majesco^{AU, NA}, THQ^{EU}	2006-05-23^{NA}		Yes	Yes
Jeep Thrills	Game Sauce	DSI Games^{NA}, Zoo Digital Publishing^{PAL}	2008-08-05^{NA}		Yes	Yes
Jello	Phoenix Games	Phoenix Games	2006^{EU}		Yes	
Jelly Belly: Ballistic Beans	Blue Monkey Studios	Zoo Digital Publishing^{EU}, Zoo Games^{NA}	2009-03-27^{EU}		Yes	
Jeopardy!	Artech Studios	Atari	2003-10-28^{NA}			Yes
Jeremy McGrath Supercross World	Acclaim Studios Salt Lake City	Acclaim Max Sports	2001-11-15^{NA}		Yes	Yes
Jet de Go! 2: Let's Go By Airliner	Taito	Taito	2002-03-28^{JP}	Yes		
Jet Ion Grand Prix •Hresvelgr: International Edition^{JP} (Note: update for Hresvelgr.)	Gust	Gust^{JP}, Ubisoft^{EU}	2000-12-21^{JP}	Yes	Yes	
Jet X2O	Killer Game	Sony Computer Entertainment	2002-10-28^{NA}			Yes
Jetix Puzzle Buzzle •Jetix Puzzle Game^{AU}	Broadsword Interactive	Blast! Entertainment Ltd	2008-01-24^{AU}		Yes	
Jewels Ocean: Star of Sierra Leone	Pionesoft	Pionesoft	2006-02-23^{JP}	Yes		
Jigoku Shoujo Mioyosuga	Compile Heart	Compile Heart	2009-09-17^{JP}	Yes		
Jikkyou G1 Stable	Konami	Konami	2000-09-28^{JP}	Yes		
Jikkyou G1 Stable 2	Konami	Konami	2002-03-28^{JP}	Yes		
Jikkyou Jitsumei Keiba Dream Classic 2001 Autumn	Dream Japan	Bandai	2001-11-15^{JP}	Yes		
Jikkyou Jitsumei Keiba Dream Classic 2001 Spring	Dream Japan	Bandai	2001-04-05^{JP}	Yes		
Jikkyou J.League Perfect Striker 3	Konami	Konami	2001-03-22^{JP}	Yes		
Jikkyou J.League Perfect Striker 4	Konami	Konami	2001-12-27^{JP}	Yes		
Jikkyou J.League Perfect Striker 5	Konami	Konami	2002-07-25^{JP}	Yes		
Jikkyou Powerful Major League	Konami	Konami	2006-05-11^{JP}	Yes		
Jikkyou Powerful Major League 2009	Konami	Konami	2009-04-29^{JP}	Yes		
Jikkyou Powerful Pro Yakyuu 10 •Jikkyou Powerful Pro Yakyuu 10 Chou Ketteiban: 2003 Memorial (different version)	Konami	Konami	2003-07-17^{JP}	Yes		
Jikkyou Powerful Pro Yakyuu 11 •Jikkyou Powerful Pro Yakyuu 11 Chou Ketteiban (different version)	Konami	Konami	2004-07-15^{JP}	Yes		
Jikkyou Powerful Pro Yakyuu 12 •Jikkyou Powerful Pro Yakyuu 12 Ketteiban (different version)	Konami	Konami	2005-07-14^{JP}	Yes		
Jikkyou Powerful Pro Yakyuu 13 •Jikkyou Powerful Pro Yakyuu 13 Ketteiban (different version)	Konami	Konami	2006-07-13^{JP}	Yes		
Jikkyou Powerful Pro Yakyuu 14 •Jikkyou Powerful Pro Yakyuu 14 Ketteiban (different version)	Konami	Konami	2007-07-19^{JP}	Yes		
Jikkyou Powerful Pro Yakyuu 15	Konami	Konami	2008-07-24^{JP}	Yes		
Jikkyou Powerful Pro Yakyuu 2009	Konami	Konami	2009-03-19^{JP}	Yes		
Jikkyou Powerful Pro Yakyuu 7 •Jikkyou Powerful Pro Yakyuu 7 Ketteiban (different version)	Konami	Konami	2000-07-06^{JP}	Yes		
Jikkyou Powerful Pro Yakyuu 8 •Jikkyou Powerful Pro Yakyuu 8 Ketteiban (different version)	Konami	Konami	2001-08-30^{JP}	Yes		
Jikkyou Powerful Pro Yakyuu 9 •Jikkyou Powerful Pro Yakyuu 9 Ketteiban (different version)	Konami	Konami	2002-07-18^{JP}	Yes		
Jikkyou World Soccer 2000 Final Edition	Konami	Konami	2000-12-21^{JP}	Yes		
Jikkyou World Soccer 2001	Konami	Konami	2001-09-06^{JP}	Yes		
Jikkyou World Soccer 2002	Konami	Konami	2002-05-16^{JP}	Yes		
Jikuu Boukenki Zentrix	Sting Entertainment	Bandai	2005-04-21^{JP}	Yes		
Jimmy Neutron Boy Genius	THQ	THQ	2002-09-26^{NA}		Yes	Yes
Jissen Pachinko Hisshouhou! CR Aladdin Destiny EX	Sega	Sega	2007-05-31^{JP}	Yes		
Jissen Pachinko Hisshouhou! CR Hokuto no Ken	Sega	Sega	2005-12-22^{JP}	Yes		
Jissen Pachinko Hisshouhou! CR Sakura Taisen	Sega	Sega	2007-09-13^{JP}	Yes		
Jissen Pachinko Hisshouhou! CR Salaryman Kintarou	Sega	Sega	2006-11-30^{JP}	Yes		
Jissen Pachi-Slot Hisshouhou! Aladdin A	Sammy	Sammy	2002-07-18^{JP}	Yes		
Jissen Pachi-Slot Hisshouhou! Aladdin II Evolution	Sega	Sega	2005-12-15^{JP}	Yes		
Jissen Pachi-Slot Hisshouhou! Hokuto no Ken 2	Sega	Sega	2007-10-11^{JP}	Yes		
Jissen Pachi-Slot Hisshouhou! Hokuto no Ken Plus (Note: update for Jissen Pachi-Slot Hisshouhou! Pachi-Slot Hokuto no Ken.)	Sega	Sammy	2005-02-24^{JP}	Yes		
Jissen Pachi-Slot Hisshouhou! Kemono-Oh	Sammy	Sammy	2001-10-25^{JP}	Yes		
Jissen Pachi-Slot Hisshouhou! King Camel	Sammy	Sammy	2003-10-02^{JP}	Yes		
Jissen Pachi-Slot Hisshouhou! Mister Magic Neo	Sega	Sega	2007-04-12^{JP}	Yes		
Jissen Pachi-Slot Hisshouhou! Moujuu-Oh S	Sammy	Sammy	2002-12-19^{JP}	Yes		
Jissen Pachi-Slot Hisshouhou! Onimusha 3	Sammy	Sega	2005-07-14^{JP}	Yes		
Jissen Pachi-Slot Hisshouhou! Ore no Sora	Sega	Sega	2006-03-30^{JP}	Yes		
Jissen Pachi-Slot Hisshouhou! Pachi-Slot Hokuto no Ken	Sammy	Sammy	2004-05-27^{JP}	Yes		
Jissen Pachi-Slot Hisshouhou! Pachi-Slot Hokuto no Ken SE	Sega	Sega	2006-08-03^{JP}	Yes		
Jissen Pachi-Slot Hisshouhou! Salaryman Kintarou	Sammy	Sammy	2003-03-20^{JP}	Yes		
Jissen Pachi-Slot Hisshouhou! Sammy's Collection	Sammy	Sammy	2002-04-04^{JP}	Yes		
Jissen Pachi-Slot Hisshouhou! Sammy's Collection 2 •Jissen Pachi-Slot Hisshouhou! Sammy's Collection 2 DX^{JP}	Sammy	Sammy	2003-12-25^{JP}	Yes		
Jissen Pachi-Slot Hisshouhou! Savanna Park •Jissen Pachi-Slot Hisshouhou! Savanna Park DX^{JP}	Sammy	Sammy	2003-06-19^{JP}	Yes		
Jissen Pachi-Slot Hisshouhou! Selection: Salaryman Kintarou - Slotter Kintarou - Ore no Sora	Sega	Sega	2008-02-14^{JP}	Yes		
Jissen Pachi-Slot Hisshouhou! Ultraman Club ST	Sega	Sega	2006-03-16^{JP}	Yes		
Jitsumei Jikkyou Keiba Dream Classic 2002	Dream Japan	Bandai	2002-05-23^{JP}	Yes		
J.League Pro Soccer Club o Tsukurou! '04	Smilebit	Sega	2004-06-24^{JP}	Yes		
J.League Pro Soccer Club o Tsukurou! 3	Smilebit	Sega	2003-06-05^{JP}	Yes		
J.League Pro Soccer Club o Tsukurou! 5	Sega	Sega	2007-02-01^{JP}	Yes		
J.League Tactics Manager	Sammy	Sammy	2003-02-13^{JP}	Yes		
J.League Winning Eleven 10 + Europa League 06-07	Konami	Konami	2006-11-22^{JP}	Yes		
J.League Winning Eleven 2007 Club Championship	Konami	Konami	2007-08-02^{JP}	Yes		
J.League Winning Eleven 2008 Club Championship	Konami	Konami	2008-08-21^{JP}	Yes		
J.League Winning Eleven 2009 Club Championship	Konami	Konami	2009-08-06^{JP}	Yes		
J.League Winning Eleven 2010 Club Championship	Konami	Konami	2010-08-05^{JP}	Yes		
J.League Winning Eleven 5	Konami	Konami	2001-10-25^{JP}	Yes		
J.League Winning Eleven 6	Konami	Konami	2002-09-19^{JP}	Yes		
J.League Winning Eleven 8: Asia Championship	Konami	Konami	2004-11-18^{JP}	Yes		
J.League Winning Eleven 9: Asia Championship	Konami	Konami	2005-11-17^{JP}	Yes		
J.League Winning Eleven Tactics	Konami	Konami	2003-12-11^{JP}	Yes		
Johnny Bravo: Date-O-Rama!	EM Studios	Blast! Entertainment Ltd	2007-11-01^{EU}		Yes	
JoJo no Kimyou na Bouken: Ougon no Kaze	Capcom	Capcom	2002-07-25^{JP}	Yes		
Jojo no Kimyou na Bouken: Phantom Blood	Anchor Inc.	Bandai	2006-10-26^{JP}	Yes		
Jonny Moseley Mad Trix	3DO	3DO	2001-12-26^{NA}		Yes	Yes
Joshikousei Game's-High!!	Design Factory	Idea Factory	2006-09-28^{JP}	Yes		
Judge Dredd: Dredd vs. Death	Rebellion Developments	Sierra Entertainment^{EU}, Evolved Games^{NA}	2003-10-17^{EU}		Yes	Yes
Judie no Atelier: Gramnad no Renkinjutsushi	Gust	Gust	2002-06-27^{JP}	Yes		
Juiced •Juiced: Tuning Car Densetsu^{JP}	Juice Games	THQ	2005-06-13^{NA}	Yes ^{JP, KO}	Yes	Yes
Juiced 2: Hot Import Nights	Juice Games	THQ	2007-09-17^{NA}	Yes	Yes	Yes
Jumanji	Atomic Planet Entertainment	Blast! Entertainment Ltd	2006^{EU}		Yes	
Jumper: Griffin's Story	Collision Studios	Brash Entertainment	2008-02-12^{NA}		Yes	Yes
Junior Board Games	Mere Mortals	Oxygen Games	2004-11-04^{EU}		Yes	
Junjou Romanchika: Koi no Doki Doki Daisakusen	Marvelous Entertainment	Marvelous Entertainment	2008-11-27^{JP}	Yes		
Jurassic Park: Operation Genesis •Keiei Simulation: Jurassic Park^{JP}	Blue Tongue Entertainment	Vivendi Universal Games^{EU, NA}, Konami^{JP}	2003-03-25^{NA}	Yes	Yes	Yes
Jurassic: The Hunted	Cauldron	Activision	2009-11-03^{NA}			Yes
Just Cause	Avalanche Studios	Eidos Interactive	2006-09-22^{EU}		Yes	Yes
Justice League Heroes	Snowblind Studios	Warner Bros. Interactive^{NA}, Eidos Interactive^{PAL}	2006-10-17^{NA}		Yes	Yes
Juujigen Rippoutai Cipher: Game of Survival	Abel Software	Abel Software	2007-06-28^{JP}	Yes		
Juuni Kokuki: Guren no Shirube, Koujin no Michi	Konami	Konami	2003-08-28^{JP}	Yes		
Juuni Kokuki: Kakukakutaru Oudou, Kouryoku no Uka	Konami	Konami	2004-06-17^{JP}	Yes		
K-1 Premium 2004 Dynamite!!	FEG	D3 Publisher	2004-12-22^{JP}	Yes		
K-1 Premium 2005 Dynamite •Simple 2000 Ultimate Series Vol. 29: K-1 Premium 2005 Dynamite^{JP}	HuneX	D3 Publisher	2005-12-22^{JP}	Yes		
K-1 World GP 2005	D3 Publisher	D3 Publisher	2005-12-01^{JP}	Yes		
K-1 World GP 2006	D3 Publisher	D3 Publisher	2006-11-22^{JP}	Yes		
K-1 World Grand Prix	Konami	Konami	2002-11-28^{JP}	Yes		Yes
K-1 World Grand Prix 2001	Konami	Konami	2001-12-06^{JP}	Yes		
K-1 World Grand Prix 2003	Konami	Konami	2003-11-27^{JP}	Yes		
K-1 World Grand Prix: The Beast Attack!	Konami	Konami	2003-07-31^{JP}	Yes		
K-1 World Max 2005 •Simple 2000 Ultimate Series Vol. 31: K-1 World Max 2005^{JP}	Konami	Konami	2005-07-16^{JP}	Yes		
Ka 2: Let's Go Hawaii	Zoom	Sony Computer Entertainment	2003-07-03^{JP}	Yes		
Kaan: Barbarian's Blade	EKO Software	DreamCatcher Interactive	2004-02-13^{EU}		Yes	
Kaena	Xilam	Namco	2004-04-15^{JP}	Yes		
Kaerazu no Mori	Global A	Global A	2002-12-26^{JP}	Yes		
Kaeru Batake de Tsukamaete	Takuyo	Takuyo	2010-04-28^{JP}	Yes		
Kaeru Batake de Tsukamaete: Natsu Chigira Sansen (Note: stand-alone expansion for Kaeru Batake de Tsukamaete.)	Takuyo	Takuyo	2010-12-28^{JP}	Yes		
Kaido Racer •Kaido Battle 2: Chain Reaction^{JP}	Genki	Genki^{JP}, Konami^{PAL}	2004-02-26^{JP}	Yes	Yes	
Kaiketsu! Osabakiina	KID	KID	2004-07-29^{JP}	Yes		
Kaiketsu Zorori: Mezase! Itazura King	Bandai	Bandai	2004-04-28^{JP}	Yes		
Kaitou Apricot Kanzenban	Takuyo	Takuyo	2005-01-20^{JP}	Yes		
Kakinoki Shogi IV	ASCII Entertainment	ASCII Entertainment	2000-03-04^{JP}	Yes		
Kakutou Bijin Wulong	DreamFactory	Namco Bandai Games	2006-06-22^{JP}	Yes		
Kamaitachi no Yoru 2	ChunSoft	ChunSoft	2002-07-18^{JP}	Yes		
Kamaitachi no Yoru ×3	ChunSoft	Sega	2006-07-27^{JP}	Yes		
Kamen Rider 555	Namco Bandai	Namco Bandai	2003-12-18^{JP}	Yes		
Kamen Rider Blade	Digifloyd	Namco Bandai	2004-12-09^{JP}	Yes		
Kamen Rider: Climax Heroes	Eighting	Namco Bandai	2009-08-06^{JP}	Yes		
Kamen Rider Hibiki	Namco Bandai	Namco Bandai	2005-12-01^{JP}	Yes		
Kamen Rider Kabuto	Namco Bandai	Namco Bandai	2006-11-30^{JP}	Yes		
Kamen Rider: Seigi No Keifu	Banpresto	Banpresto	2003-11-27^{JP}	Yes		
Kamisama Kazoku: Ouen Ganbou	Dorart	Dorart	2006-09-21^{JP}	Yes		
Kamiwaza	Acquire	Acquire	2006-08-31^{JP}	Yes		
Kamiyo Gakuen Makorouku Kurunugia	Idea Factory	Idea Factory	2008-10-09^{JP}	Yes		
The Kanji Quiz •Simple 2000 Series Vol. 46: The Kanji Quiz – Challenge! Kanji Kentai^{JP}	Vingt-et-un Systems	D3 Publisher	2004-03-18^{JP}	Yes		
Kanojo no Densetsu, Boku no Sekiban	Best Media	D3 Publisher	2003-12-18^{JP}	Yes		
Kanokon: Esuii	5pb	5pb	2008-07-31^{JP}	Yes		
Kanon	Key	Interchannel	2002-02-28^{JP}	Yes		
The Kanshikikan •Simple 2000 Series Vol. 70: The Kanshikikan^{JP}	Tomcat System	D3 Publisher	2005-02-17^{JP}	Yes		
Kanuchi: Kuroki Tsubasa no Shou	Vingt-et-un Systems	Idea Factory	2009-04-23^{JP}	Yes		
Kanuchi: Shiroki Tsubasa no Shou	Vingt-et-un Systems	Idea Factory	2008-10-02^{JP}	Yes		
Kao no nai Tsuki Select Story	Root	Kadokawa Games	2009-10-01^{JP}	Yes		
Kao the Kangaroo Round 2	Tate Interactive	JoWooD Productions^{EU}, Atari^{NA}	2005-04-15^{EU}		Yes	Yes
Kappa no Kai-Kata	Konami	Konami	2004-10-14^{JP}	Yes		
Karaoke Revolution •Karaoke Stage^{EU}	Harmonix Music Systems	Konami	2003-10-24^{NA}		Yes	Yes
Karaoke Revolution: Anime Song Collection	Konami	Konami	2003-12-18^{JP}	Yes		
Karaoke Revolution: Dreams & Memories	Konami	Konami	2004-03-18^{JP}	Yes		
Karaoke Revolution: Family Pack	Konami	Konami	2004-07-22^{JP}	Yes		
Karaoke Revolution: J-Pop Best Vol. 1	Konami	Konami	2003-11-27^{JP}	Yes		
Karaoke Revolution: J-Pop Best Vol. 2	Konami	Konami	2003-11-27^{JP}	Yes		
Karaoke Revolution: J-Pop Best Vol. 3	Konami	Konami	2003-11-27^{JP}	Yes		
Karaoke Revolution: J-Pop Best Vol. 4	Konami	Konami	2003-11-27^{JP}	Yes		
Karaoke Revolution: J-Pop Best Vol. 5	Konami	Konami	2003-12-18^{JP}	Yes		
Karaoke Revolution: J-Pop Best Vol. 6	Konami	Konami	2003-12-18^{JP}	Yes		
Karaoke Revolution: J-Pop Best Vol. 7	Konami	Konami	2003-12-18^{JP}	Yes		
Karaoke Revolution: J-Pop Best Vol. 8	Konami	Konami	2003-12-18^{JP}	Yes		
Karaoke Revolution: J-Pop Best Vol. 9	Konami	Konami	2004-03-18^{JP}	Yes		
Karaoke Revolution: Kazoku Idol Sengen	Konami	Konami	2004-07-22^{JP}	Yes		
Karaoke Revolution: Kissing Selection	Konami	Konami	2004-04-22^{JP}	Yes		
Karaoke Revolution: Love & Ballad	Konami	Konami	2003-11-27^{JP}	Yes		
Karaoke Revolution: Night Selection 2003	Konami	Konami	2003-11-27^{JP}	Yes		
Karaoke Revolution Party	Harmonix Music Systems	Konami	2005-11-08^{NA}			Yes
Karaoke Revolution Presents: American Idol	Blitz Games	Konami	2007-01-02^{NA}			Yes
Karaoke Revolution Presents: American Idol Encore	Blitz Games	Konami	2008-02-05^{NA}			Yes
Karaoke Revolution: Snow & Party	Konami	Konami	2003-12-18^{JP}	Yes		
Karaoke Revolution Volume 2	Harmonix Music Systems	Konami	2004-07-13^{NA}			Yes
Karaoke Revolution Volume 3	Harmonix Music Systems	Konami	2004-11-09^{NA}			Yes
Karaoke Stage 2	Konami	Konami	2006-03-24^{EU}		Yes	
Kart Racer	Nordic Games Publishing	Nordic Games Publishing	2009-06-25^{EU}		Yes	
Kashimashi! Girl Meets Girl	Marvelous Entertainment	Marvelous Entertainment	2006-03-30^{JP}	Yes		
Katakamuna: Ushinawareta Ingaritsu	Alchemist	Alchemist	2004-11-25^{JP}	Yes		
Katamari Damacy	Now Production	Namco	2004-03-18^{JP}	Yes		Yes
Katekyoo Hitman Reborn! Dream Hyper Battle!	Marvelous Entertainment	Marvelous Entertainment	2007-08-30^{JP}	Yes		
Katekyoo Hitman Reborn! Kindan no Yami no Delta	Marvelous Entertainment	Marvelous Entertainment	2008-11-20^{JP}	Yes		
Katekyoo Hitman Reborn!! Let's Ansatsu!? Nerawareta 10 Daime!	Takara Tomy	Takara Tomy	2007-10-25^{JP}	Yes		
Katekyoo Hitman Reborn Nerae!? Ring x Bongole Returns	Marvelous Entertainment	Marvelous Entertainment	2008-08-28^{JP}	Yes		
Kattobi! Golf	Konami	Konami	2003-03-27^{JP}	Yes		
Kazeiro Surf	Russel Corporation	Russel Corporation	2009-05-28^{JP}	Yes		
Kazoku Keikaku: Kokoro no Kizuna	Interchannel	Interchannel	2005-02-24^{JP}	Yes		
The Keihin Kyuukou: Train Simulator Real	Ongakukan	Sony Computer Entertainment	2002-10-31^{JP}	Yes		
Kelly Slater's Pro Surfer •Kelly Slater's Pro Surfer 2003^{JP}	Treyarch	Activision^{EU, NA}, Capcom^{JP}	2002-09-16^{NA}	Yes	Yes	Yes
Kengo 3	Lightweight	Genki	2004-09-22^{JP}	Yes		
Kengo: Master of Bushido •Kengo^{JP}	Lightweight	Genki^{JP}, Crave Entertainment^{NA}, Ubisoft^{EU}	2000-12-14^{JP}	Yes	Yes	Yes
Kenka Banchou	Y'sK	Spike	2005-06-09^{JP}	Yes		
Kenka Banchou 2: Full Throttle	Y'sK	Spike	2007-03-08^{JP}	Yes		
Kenran Butou Sai: The Mars Daybreak	Alfa System	Sony Computer Entertainment	2005-07-07^{JP}	Yes		
Keroro Gunsou: MeroMero Battle Royale	Bandai	Bandai	2004-09-30^{JP}	Yes		
Keroro Gunsou: MeroMero Battle Royale Z	Bandai	Bandai	2005-11-17^{JP}	Yes		
Kessen	Koei	Koei^{JP}, Electronic Arts^{EU, NA}	2000-03-04^{JP}	Yes	Yes	Yes
Kessen II	Koei	Koei^{JP, NA}, THQ^{EU}	2001-03-29^{JP}	Yes	Yes	Yes
Kessen III	Koei	Koei	2004-12-22^{JP}	Yes	Yes	Yes
KeyboardMania	Konami	Konami	2000-09-21^{JP}	Yes		
KeyboardMania II: 2nd Mix & 3rd Mix	Konami	Konami	2002-02-28^{JP}	Yes		
Kiddies Party Pack	Phoenix Games	Phoenix Games	2006^{EU}		Yes	
Kidou Senshi Gundam 00: Gundam Meisters	Yuke's	Bandai Namco Games	2008-10-16^{JP}	Yes		
Kidou Senshi Gundam: Ghiren no Yabou – Axis no Kyoui V	BEC	Bandai Namco Games	2009-02-12^{JP}	Yes		
Kidou Senshi Gundam: Ghiren no Yabou – Zeon Dokuritsu Sensouden	Bandai	Bandai	2002-05-02^{JP}	Yes		
Kidou Senshi Gundam: Ghiren no Yabou – Zeon Dokuritsu Sensouden – Kouryaku Shireisho (Note: expansion for Kidou Senshi Gundam: Ghiren no Yabou – Zeon Dokuritsu Sensouden.) (Note: includes a Gundam Puzzle mini-game.)	Bandai	Bandai	2003-02-20^{JP}	Yes		
Kidou Senshi Gundam SEED Destiny: Generation of C.E.	Tom Create	Bandai	2005-08-25^{JP}	Yes		
Kidou Senshi Gundam SEED Destiny: Rengou vs. Z.A.F.T. II Plus	Bandai Namco Games	Bandai Namco Games	2006-12-07^{JP}	Yes		
Kidou Senshi Gundam SEED: Rengou vs. Z.A.F.T.	Capcom	Bandai	2005-11-17^{JP}	Yes		
Kidou Senshi Gundam Senki: Lost War Chronicles	Bandai	Bandai	2002-08-01^{JP}	Yes		
Kidou Shinsengumi: Moeyo Ken	RED Entertainment	Enterbrain	2002-12-26^{JP}	Yes		
Kidz Sports Basketball	Data Design Interactive	Phoenix Games	2004-08-31^{EU}		Yes	
Kidz Sports Ice Hockey	Data Design Interactive	Phoenix Games	2008-05-15^{AU}		Yes ^{AU}	
Kikou Busou G-Breaker 2: Doumei no Hangeki	Atelier-Sai	Sunrise Interactive	2002-08-08^{JP}	Yes		
Kikou Busou G-Breaker: Daisanshi Cloudia Taisen	Atelier-Sai	Sunrise Interactive	2002-04-25^{JP}	Yes		
Kikou Busou G-Breaker: Legend of Cloudia	Atelier-Sai	Sunrise Interactive	2002-11-07^{JP}	Yes		
Kikou Heidan J-Phoenix	Shoeisha	Takara	2001-06-28^{JP}	Yes		
Kikou Heidan J-Phoenix 2	Takara	Atlus	2004-02-26^{JP}	Yes		
Kikou Heidan J-Phoenix 2 Joshouhen	Takara	Takara	2003-08-28^{JP}	Yes		
Kikou Heidan J-Phoenix: Burst Tactics	Takara	Takara	2002-04-25^{JP}	Yes		
Kikou Heidan J-Phoenix: Cobalt Shoutaihen	Takara	Takara	2002-12-05^{JP}	Yes		
Kikou Heidan J-Phoenix Joshouhen	Takara	Takara	2001-02-15^{JP}	Yes		
Kikou Souhei Armodyne	Omiya Soft	Sony Computer Entertainment	2007-02-22^{JP}	Yes		
Kill Switch	Namco	Namco^{NA}, Sony Computer Entertainment^{EU}	2003-10-28^{NA}		Yes	Yes
Killer7	Grasshopper Manufacture	Capcom	2005-06-09^{JP}	Yes	Yes	Yes
Killzone	Guerrilla Games	Sony Computer Entertainment^{EU, KO, NA}, Sega^{JP}	2004-11-02^{NA}	Yes ^{JP, KO}	Yes	Yes
Kimagure Strawberry Cafe •Simple 2000 Series Vol. 84: The Boku ni Oma Cafe – Kimagure Strawberry Cafe^{JP}	Vingt-et-un Systems	D3 Publisher	2003-10-09^{JP}	Yes		
Kimi ga Aruji de Shitsuji ga Ore de: Otsukae Nikki	Minato Station	Minato Station	2008-03-27^{JP}	Yes		
Kimi ga Nozomu Eien: Rumbling Hearts	âge	PrincessSoft	2003-05-01^{JP}	Yes		
KimiKiss	Enterbrain	Enterbrain	2006-05-25^{JP}	Yes		
KimiStar: Kimi to Study	Primavera	Primavera	2006-04-27^{JP}	Yes		
Kinetica	Santa Monica Studio	Sony Computer Entertainment America	2001-10-14^{NA}			Yes
King Arthur	Krome Studios	Konami	2004-11-17^{NA}		Yes	Yes
King of Clubs	Oxygen Games	Oxygen Games	2007-10-26^{EU}		Yes	
King of Colosseum II	Spike	Spike	2004-09-09^{JP}	Yes		
King of Colosseum (Red): Shin Nippon x Zen Nippon x Pancrase Disc	Spike	Spike	2002-12-19^{JP}	Yes		
King of Colosseum: Zero-One Disc	Spike	Spike	2003-03-06^{JP}	Yes		
The King of Fighters 2000	Playmore	Playmore	2002-11-28^{JP}	Yes		
The King of Fighters 2001	SNK Playmore	SNK Playmore	2003-10-23^{JP}	Yes		
The King of Fighters 2002	SNK Playmore	SNK Playmore^{JP}, Ignition Entertainment^{EU}	2004-03-25^{JP}	Yes	Yes	
The King of Fighters 2002: Unlimited Match •The King of Fighters 2002: Unlimited Match Tougeki Ver. (different version) (Note: update for The King of Fighters 2002.)	SNK Playmore	SNK Playmore	2009-02-26^{JP}	Yes		
The King of Fighters 2003	SNK Playmore	SNK Playmore^{JP}, Ignition Entertainment^{PAL}	2004-10-28^{JP}	Yes	Yes	
The King of Fighters 2006 •King of Fighters: Maximum Impact 2^{JP, PAL} •The King of Fighters: Maximum Impact 2^{KO} •King of Fighters Maximum Impact Regulation A^{JP, KO} (different version)	SNK Playmore	SNK Playmore^{AU, JP, KO, NA}, Ignition Entertainment^{EU}	2006-04-27^{JP}	Yes ^{JP, KO}	Yes	Yes
The King of Fighters '94 Re-bout	SNK Playmore	SNK Playmore	2004-12-28^{JP}	Yes		
The King of Fighters '98 Ultimate Match	SNK Playmore	SNK Playmore^{JP}, Ignition Entertainment^{EU, NA}	2008-06-26^{JP}	Yes	Yes	Yes
The King of Fighters Collection: The Orochi Saga	Terminal Reality	SNK Playmore^{JP, KO, NA}, Ignition Entertainment^{EU}	2006-04-20^{JP}	Yes ^{JP, KO}	Yes	Yes
The King of Fighters: Maximum Impact •The King of Fighters - Maximum Impact Maniax^{JP} (different version)	SNK Playmore	SNK Playmore^{JP, KO, NA}, Ignition Entertainment^{PAL}	2004-08-12^{JP}	Yes	Yes	Yes
The King of Fighters NeoWave	SNK Playmore	SNK Playmore^{AU, JP}, Ignition Entertainment^{EU}	2005-07-21^{JP}	Yes ^{JP, KO}	Yes	
The King of Fighters NESTS Collection	SNK Playmore	SNK Playmore	2007-04-19^{JP}	Yes		
The King of Fighters XI	SNK Playmore	SNK Playmore^{AU, JP, KO, NA}, Ignition Entertainment^{EU}	2006-06-22^{JP}	Yes ^{JP, KO}	Yes	Yes
The King of Route 66	Sega AM2	Sega	2003-03-18^{NA}		Yes	Yes
Kingdom Hearts •Kingdom Hearts: Final Mix^{JP} (different version)	Square	Square^{JP}, Square Electronic Arts^{NA}, Sony Computer Entertainment^{PAL}	2002-03-28^{JP}	Yes	Yes	Yes
Kingdom Hearts II •Kingdom Hearts II: Final Mix +^{JP} (different version)	Square Enix	Square Enix	2005-12-22^{JP}	Yes	Yes	Yes
Kingdom Hearts Re:Chain of Memories	Square Enix	Square Enix	2007-03-29^{JP}	Yes		Yes
King's Field IV: The Ancient City •King's Field IV^{EU, JP}	FromSoftware	FromSoftware^{JP}, Agetec^{NA}, Metro 3D^{EU}	2001-10-04^{JP}	Yes	Yes	Yes
Kiniro no Corda 2	Koei	Koei	2007-03-15^{JP}	Yes		
Kiniro no Corda 2 Encore (Note: stand-alone expansion for Kiniro no Corda 2.)	Koei	Koei	2007-09-20^{JP}	Yes		
Kiniro no Corda 3	Koei	Koei	2010-02-25^{JP}	Yes		
Kinkou Myaku Tansa Simulation: Ingot 79	Microvision	FAB Communications	2002-11-14^{JP}	Yes		
Kinniku Banzuke: Muscle Wars 21	Konami	Konami	2001-08-09^{JP}	Yes		
Kinnikuman Muscle Grand Prix Max	Aki Corp.	Bandai Namco Games	2006-07-27^{JP}	Yes		
Kinnikuman Muscle Grand Prix Max 2: Tokumori	Aki Corp.	Bandai Namco Games	2008-09-25^{JP}	Yes		
Kino no Tabi II: The Beautiful World	MediaWorks	MediaWorks	2005-12-01^{JP}	Yes		
Kino no Tabi: The Beautiful World	MediaWorks	MediaWorks	2003-07-17^{JP}	Yes		
Kira * Kira: Rock 'n' Roll Show	PrincessSoft	PrincessSoft	2009-02-26^{JP}	Yes		
Kirikou et les bêtes sauvages	Wizarbox	Emma	2007-03-16^{EU}		Yes	
Kiruto: Anata to Tsumugu Yume to Koi no Dress	Nine'sFox	Nine'sFox	2007-05-31^{JP}	Yes		
The Kiryoku Kentei •Simple 2000 Honkaku Shikou Series Vol. 5: The Kiryoku Kentei^{JP}	Yuki	D3 Publisher	2003-11-27^{JP}	Yes		
Kishin Houkou Demon Bane	Nitro+	Kadokawa	2004-04-01^{JP}	Yes		
Kita e Diamond Dust+ Kiss is Beginning (Note: stand-alone expansion for Kita e. Diamond Dust.)	Red 5 Software	Hudson Soft	2004-10-28^{JP}	Yes		
Kita e. Diamond Dust Volume Summer	Red 5 Software	Hudson Soft	2003-10-30^{JP}	Yes		
Kitakata Kenzou San Goku Shi	Media Factory	Media Factory	2001-06-14^{JP}	Yes		
Kiwame Mahjong DXII	Athena	Athena	2003-12-18^{JP}	Yes		
Klonoa 2: Lunatea's Veil	Namco	Namco^{JP, NA}, Sony Computer Entertainment^{EU}	2001-03-22^{JP}	Yes	Yes	Yes
Knight Rider: The Game	Davilex Games	Davilex Games^{EU}, Joyon^{KO}	2002-11-22^{EU}	Yes ^{KO}	Yes	
Knight Rider: The Game 2	Davilex Games	Davilex Games	2004-11-05^{EU}		Yes	
Knights of the Temple II	Cauldron	TDK Mediactive	2005-10-24^{EU}		Yes	
Knights of the Temple: Infernal Crusade	Starbreeze Studios	TDK Mediactive	2004-06-04^{EU}		Yes	
Knockout Kings 2001	Black Ops Entertainment	Electronic Arts	2001-02-05^{NA}	Yes	Yes	Yes
Knockout Kings 2002	Electronic Arts	Electronic Arts	2002-03-04^{NA}	Yes	Yes	Yes
K.O. King	Phoenix Games	Phoenix Games	2006-11-03^{EU}		Yes	
Kohitsuji Hokaku Keakaku! Sweet Boys Life	Idea Factory	Idea Factory	2006-11-24^{JP}	Yes		
Koi to Namida to, Tsuioku to... •Simple 2000 Series Vol. 45: Koi to Namida to, Tsuioku to...^{JP}	HuneX	D3 Publisher	2004-03-18^{JP}	Yes		
Koihime + Musou: Doki! Shoujo Darake no Sangokushi Engi	Yeti	Yeti	2008-11-20^{JP}	Yes		
Koisuru Otome to Shugo no Tate: The Shield of AIGIS	Alchemist	Alchemist	2008-11-20^{JP}	Yes		
Kokoro no Tobira	GeneX	GeneX	2004-04-08^{JP}	Yes		
Komorebi no Namikimichi: Utsurikawaru Kisetsu no Chuu de	GN Software	GN Software	2004-07-29^{JP}	Yes		
Konami Kids Playground: Alphabet Circus	ImaginEngine	Konami	2007-09-11^{NA}			Yes
Konami Kids Playground: Dinosaurs - Shapes & Colors	ImaginEngine	Konami	2007-09-11^{NA}			Yes
Konami Kids Playground: Frogger Hop, Skip & Jumpin' Fun	ImaginEngine	Konami	2007-09-11^{NA}			Yes
Konami Kids Playground: Toy Pals Fun with Numbers	ImaginEngine	Konami	2007-09-11^{NA}			Yes
The Konchuu Saishuu •Simple 2000 Series Vol. 83: The Konchuu Saishuu^{JP}	Crossroad	D3 Publisher	2005-09-08^{JP}	Yes		
Konjiki no Gash Bell!! Go! Go! Mamono Fight!!	Eighting	Bandai	2005-12-15^{JP}	Yes		
Konjiki no Gash Bell!: Yuujou Tag Battle	Eighting	Bandai	2004-03-25^{JP}	Yes		
Konneko: Keep a Memory Green	Yeti	Yeti	2005-10-27^{JP}	Yes		
Kono Aozora ni Yakusoku o: Melody of the Sun and Sea	Alchemist	Alchemist	2007-05-31^{JP}	Yes		
Kono Haretasora no Shita de	Starfish SD	Starfish SD	2005-03-31^{JP}	Yes		
Konohana 2: Todoke Kanai Requiem	Vridge	Success	2002-05-30^{JP}	Yes		
Konohana 3: Itsuwari no Kage no Mukou ni	Vridge	Success	2003-05-01^{JP}	Yes		
Konohana 4: Yami wo Harau Inori	Vridge	Success	2004-09-09^{JP}	Yes		
Korokke! Ban-Ou no Kiki o Sukue	Konami	Konami	2004-07-08^{JP}	Yes		
Kotoba no Puzzle: Mojipittan	Namco	Namco	2003-01-09^{JP}	Yes		
Kou Rate Ura Mahjong Retsuden Mukoubuchi: Goburei, Last desu ne	Pi Arts	Pi Arts	2007-10-25^{JP}	Yes		
Kouenji Joshi Soccer	Starfish SD	Starfish SD	2006-04-13^{JP}	Yes		
Koufuku Sousakan	Sony Computer Entertainment	Sony Computer Entertainment	2004-04-15^{JP}	Yes		
Koushien: Konpeki no Sora	Mahou	Mahou	2002-02-14^{JP}	Yes		
Kousoku Tanigawa Shogi	Seta Corporation	Seta Corporation	2001-02-22^{JP}	Yes		
Kowloon Youma Gakuenki	Atlus	Atlus	2004-09-16^{JP}	Yes		
Kujibiki Unbalance: Kaicho Onegai Smash Fight	Shade	Marvelous Entertainment	2007-01-25^{JP}	Yes		
Kuma Uta	Sony Computer Entertainment	Sony Computer Entertainment	2003-11-20^{JP}	Yes		
Kuon	FromSoftware	FromSoftware^{JP}, YBM Sisa^{KO}, Agetec Inc.^{NA}, Nobilis^{EU}	2004-04-01^{JP}	Yes ^{JP, KO}	Yes	Yes
Kuon no Kizuna: Sairinsho	FOG Inc.	FOG Inc.	2002-07-18^{JP}	Yes		
Kurogane no Houkou: Warship Commander	Koei	Koei	2001-04-05^{JP}	Yes		
Kuryuu Youma Gakuenki Recharge (Note: update for Kowloon Youma Gakuenki.)	Killaware	Atlus	2006-09-28^{JP}	Yes		
Kuusen II	Opera House	Kadokawa Games	2004-02-11^{JP}	Yes		
Kya: Dark Lineage	Eden Games	Atari	2003-11-18^{NA}		Yes	Yes
Kyo Kara Maoh! Hajimari no Tabi	Namco	Namco	2006-07-27^{JP}	Yes		
Kyo Kara Maoh! Shin Makoku no Kyuujitsu	Bandai Namco Games	Bandai Namco Games	2007-09-27^{JP}	Yes		
Kyojin no Hoshi	Capcom	Capcom	2002-06-20^{JP}	Yes		
Kyo-no Wanko •Mezamashi Telebi 10th Anniversary: Kyo-no Wanko^{JP}	DigiCube	DigiCube	2003-07-24^{JP}	Yes		
Kyoufu Shinbun (Heisei-Han) Kaiki! Shinrei File	Konami	Konami	2003-08-07^{JP}	Yes		
Kyoushuu Kidou Butai: Kougeki Helicopter Senki	ASK	Taito	2004-09-30^{JP}	Yes		
Kyuuketsu Hime Yui: Senyasyo	GeneX	GeneX	2003-03-27^{JP}	Yes		
Kyuuketsu Kitan Moonties	Interchannel	Interchannel	2008-02-28^{JP}	Yes		

== Applications ==
Title	Developer	Publisher	First released	JP	EU^{/ PAL}	NA
Anime Eikaiwa: 15 Shounen Hyouryuuhen	Success Corporation	Success Corporation	2001-08-30^{JP}	Yes		
Anime Eikaiwa: Tondemo Nezumi Daikatsuyaku	Success Corporation	Success Corporation	2001-08-30^{JP}	Yes		
Anime Eikaiwa: Totoi	Success Corporation	Success Corporation	2001-08-30^{JP}	Yes		
Check-i-TV	Sony Computer Entertainment	Sony Computer Entertainment	2001-04-26^{JP}	Yes		
Chou! Rakushii Internet Tomodachi no Wa	SunSoft	SunSoft	2002-01-24^{JP}	Yes		
Cinema Surfing: Youga Taizen	Victor Interactive Software	Victor Interactive Software	2001-12-27^{JP}	Yes		
Colorio: Hagaki Print	Epson	Epson	2000-12-07^{JP}	Yes		
Digital Hitz Factory •Music 3000^{EU}	Jester Interactive	Jester Interactive^{EU}, Jack of All Games^{NA}	2003-05-30^{EU}		Yes	Yes
DJ: Decks & FX (House Edition)	Relentless Software	Sony Computer Entertainment	2004-09-10^{EU}		Yes	
DJbox	Sony Computer Entertainment	Sony Computer Entertainment	2004-07-29^{JP}	Yes		
Doko Demo Issho: Watashi na Ehon	Japan Studio	Sony Computer Entertainment	2003-04-24^{JP}	Yes		
EGBrowser	Ergo Soft	Ergo Soft	2001-04-12^{JP}	Yes		
EGBrowser BB	Ergo Soft	Ergo Soft	2001-06-27^{JP}	Yes		
EGBrowser Light For I-O Data Device Inc.	Ergo Soft	Ergo Soft	2001-04-12^{JP}	Yes		
eJay Clubworld	Unique Development Studios	Empire Interactive^{EU}, Crave Entertainment^{NA}	2002-08-30^{EU}		Yes	Yes
Gendai Yougo no Kiso Chishiki 2001	Artdink	Artdink	2001-12-06^{JP}	Yes		
Hakoniwa Tetsudou: Blue Train Tokkyuuhen	Success	Success	2002-05-30^{JP}	Yes		
Katei no Igaku	Artdink	Artdink	2001-12-06^{JP}	Yes		

== Bundles ==
Title	Developer	Publisher	First released	JP	EU^{/ PAL}	NA
.hack//Vol. 1 x Vol. 2	CyberConnect2	Namco Bandai Games	2006-03-02^{JP}	Yes		
.hack//Vol. 3 x Vol. 4	CyberConnect2	Namco Bandai Games	2006-03-02^{JP}	Yes		
The Bass Fishing & The Bowling •Simple 2000 2-in-1 Series Vol. 2: The Bass Fishing & The Bowling Hyper^{JP}	Tamsoft, Vingt-et-un Systems	D3 Publisher	2005-06-02^{JP}	Yes		
BioHazard: 5th Anniversary Package	Capcom	Capcom	2001-03-22^{JP}	Yes		
BioHazard Code Veronica Kanzenhan/BioHazard 4 Value Pack	Capcom	Capcom	2009-09-17^{JP}	Yes		
Burnout Anthology •Compilation of Burnout 3: Takedown, Burnout Dominator, and Burnout Revenge	Criterion Games	Electronic Arts	2008-11-19^{NA}			Yes
The Bushidou & The Sniper 2 •Simple 2000 Series 2-in-1 Vol. 4: The Bushidou & The Sniper 2^{JP}	ALU, Best Media	D3 Publisher	2005-08-04^{JP}	Yes		
Call of Duty: Legacy •Compilation of Call of Duty: Finest Hour and Call of Duty 2: Big Red One	Spark Unlimited, Treyarch	Activision	2007-11-14^{NA}			Yes
Crash Bandicoot Action Pack •Compilation of Crash Nitro Kart, Crash Tag Team Racing, and Crash Twinsanity	Radical Entertainment, Traveller's Tales, Vicarious Visions	Vivendi Games	2007-06-12^{NA}		Yes	Yes
Dengeki SP: Futakoi Collection; Compilation of Futakoi and Futakoi: Koi to Mizugi no Survival	MediaWorks	MediaWorks	2006-03-02^{JP}	Yes		
Devil May Cry: 5th Anniversary Collection	Capcom	Capcom	2006-10-24^{NA}			Yes
Digital Devil Saga: Avatar Tuner 1 & 2 •Compilation of Shin Megami Tensei: Digital Devil Saga and Shin Megami Tensei: Digital Devil Saga 2	Atlus	Atlus	2005-09-30^{KO}	Yes ^{KO}		
The Document of Metal Gear Solid 2	KCEJ	Konami	2002-09-12^{JP}	Yes		Yes
Dragon Ball Z: Trilogy •Compilation of Dragon Ball Z: Budokai Tenkaichi, Dragon Ball Z: Budokai Tenkaichi 2, and Super Dragon Ball Z	Spike	Atari	2008-09-24^{NA}			Yes
ESA Foundation Compilation Set •Compilation of ATV Offroad Fury 2, Need for Speed: Hot Pursuit 2, and Splashdown: Rides Gone Wild	Sony Computer Entertainment	Sony Computer Entertainment	2005-11-10^{NA}			Yes
Escape 03 Charity Pack •Compilation of Commandos 2: Men of Courage, SSX Tricky, and WRC II Extreme	Pyro Studios, EA Games, Evolution Studios	Electronic Arts	2005-08-23^{EU}		Yes	
Final Fantasy XI: All in One Pack 2004 •Compilation of Final Fantasy XI: Chains of Promathia and Final Fantasy XI: Rise of the Zilart	Square Enix	Square Enix	2004-09-16^{JP}	Yes		Yes
Final Fantasy XI: Vana'diel Collection 2008 •Final Fantasy XI: The Vana'diel Collection^{JP} •Compilation of Final Fantasy XI, Final Fantasy XI: Chains of Promathia, Final Fantasy XI: Treasures of Aht Urhgan and Final Fantasy XI: Wings of the Goddess	Square Enix	Square Enix	2007-11-20^{NA}	Yes		Yes
Final Fantasy XI: Vana'diel Collection 2010 •Final Fantasy XI: The Vana'diel Collection 2^{JP}	Square Enix	Square Enix	2009-11-10^{JP}	Yes		
Final Fantasy X/X-2 Ultimate Box •Compilation of Final Fantasy X and Final Fantasy X-2	Square Enix	Square Enix	2005-09-08^{JP}	Yes		
G1 Jockey 3 + Winning Post 5 Maximum 2002	Koei	Koei	2002-12-21^{JP}	Yes		
G1 Jockey 4 + Winning Post 7 Twin Pack	Koei	Koei	2005-12-22^{JP}	Yes		
Gran Turismo 4 / Jak and Daxter: The Precursor Legacy / Tourist Trophy / Ratchet & Clank 3 •Compilation of Gran Turismo 4, Jak and Daxter: The Precursor Legacy, Tourist Trophy, Ratchet & Clank 3	Polyphony Digital, Naughty Dog, Insomniac Games	Sony Computer Entertainment	2009-05-29^{EU}		Yes	
Grand Theft Auto: Double Pack •Compilation of Grand Theft Auto III and Grand Theft Auto: Vice City	Rockstar North	Rockstar Games^{EU, NA}, Capcom^{JP}	2003-10-21^{NA}	Yes	Yes	Yes
Grand Theft Auto: Liberty City Stories / Vice City Stories •Compilation of Grand Theft Auto: Liberty City Stories and Grand Theft Auto: Vice City Stories	Rockstar Leeds	Take-Two Interactive	2009-06-23^{NA}			Yes
Grand Theft Auto: The Trilogy •Compilation of Grand Theft Auto III, Grand Theft Auto: San Andreas and Grand Theft Auto: Vice City	Rockstar North	Rockstar Games^{EU, NA}	2006-12-05^{NA}		Yes	Yes
Growlanser Generations •Growlanser Collection^{JP} •Compilation of Growlanser II: The Sense of Justice and Growlanser III: The Dual Darkness	Career Soft	Atlus^{JP}, Working Designs^{NA}	2003-12-18^{JP}	Yes		Yes
Guitar Hero & Guitar Hero II Dual Pack •Compilation of Guitar Hero and Guitar Hero II	Harmonix	Activision	2007-10-31^{NA}			Yes
Gunslinger Girl Complete Box •Compilation of Gunslinger Girl Volume I - III	Marvelous Entertainment	Bandai	2004-08-19^{JP}	Yes		
Hakuouki / Hakuouki: Zuisouroku •Compilation of Hakuouki and Hakuouki: Zuisouroku	Idea Factory	Idea Factory	2009-08-27^{JP}	Yes		
Harry Potter Collection •Compilation of Harry Potter and the Chamber of Secrets, Harry Potter and the Goblet of Fire and Harry Potter and the Prisoner of Azkaban	Electronic Arts	Electronic Arts	2007-10-23^{NA}			Yes
Hiiro no Kakera: Twin Pack (2007) •Compilation of Hiiro no Kakera and Hiiro no Kakera: Ano Sora no Shita de	Design Factory	Idea Factory	2007-02-15^{JP}	Yes		
Hiiro no Kakera: Twin Pack (2009) •Compilation of Hiiro no Kakera and Shin Hisui no Shizuku: Hiiro no Kakera 2	Design Factory	Idea Factory	2009-10-01^{JP}	Yes		
Hitman Trilogy •Hitman: The Triple Hit Pack^{EU} •Compilation of Hitman 2: Silent Assassin, Hitman: Blood Money and Hitman: Contracts	IO Interactive	Eidos Interactive	2007-06-19^{NA}		Yes	Yes
Hits Collection: Need For Speed Underground 2 / Medal of Honour Rising Sun •Compilation of Need For Speed Underground 2 and Medal of Honour Rising Sun	Electronic Arts	Electronic Arts	2005-03-18^{EU}		Yes	
Hyper Street Fighter II: The Anniversary Edition / Vampire: Darkstalkers Collection Value Pack •Compilation of Hyper Street Fighter II: The Anniversary Edition and Vampire: Darkstalkers Collection	Capcom	Capcom	2008-09-18^{JP}	Yes		
Infinity Plus •Compilation of 12Riven: The Psi-Climinal of Integral, Ever17: The Out of Infinity, Never7: The End of Infinity and Remember 11: The Age of Infinity	CyberFront	CyberFront	2008-10-09^{JP}	Yes		
Jak Triple Pack	Naughty Dog	Sony Computer Entertainment	2009-03-20^{EU}		Yes	
Kessen & Kessen II	Koei	Koei	2001-03-29^{JP}	Yes		
Kidou Senshi Gundam: Ghiren no Yabou – Zeon Dokuritsu Sensouden + Kouryaku Shireisho •Compilation of Kidou Senshi Gundam: Ghiren no Yabou – Zeon Dokuritsu Sensouden and Kidou Senshi Gundam: Ghiren no Yabou – Zeon Dokuritsu Sensouden – Kouryaku Shireisho	Bandai	Bandai	2005-02-17^{JP}	Yes		
The King of Fighters 02/03 •Compilation of King of Fighters 2002 and King of Fighters 2003	SNK Playmore	SNK Playmore	2005-02-08^{NA}			Yes
The King of Fighters 2000/2001 •Compilation of King of Fighters 2000 and King of Fighters 2001	SNK Playmore	SNK Playmore^{NA}, Ignition Entertainment^{EU}	2003-12-09^{NA}		Yes	Yes
Kingdom Hearts: Trinity Master Pieces •Compilation of Kingdom Hearts, Kingdom Hearts II and Kingdom Hearts: Chain of Memories (Game Boy Advance)	Square Enix	Square Enix	2005-12-22^{JP}	Yes		
King's Field: Dark Side Box •Compilation of King's Field, King's Field (Japan), King's Field II and King's Field: The Ancient City	FromSoftware	FromSoftware	2007-01-25^{JP}	Yes		
Konohana Pack: 3tsu no Jikenbo •Compilation of Konohana 2: Todoke Kanai Requiem and Konohana: True Report (PS1)	Vridge	Success	2004-07-08^{JP}	Yes		

== See also ==
- List of PlayStation 2 games (L–Z)
- List of PlayStation games (A–L)
- List of PlayStation games (M–Z)
- List of PlayStation 2 online games
- List of best-selling PlayStation 2 video games
- List of PlayStation 2 Classics for PlayStation 3
- List of PlayStation 2 games for PlayStation 4
