= List of Christian video games =

This is a list of Christian video game releases in order of release date. A Christian video game is a video game that incorporates themes from Christianity, reflecting Christian values.

== 1980–1989 ==
=== 1982 ===
- Bible Scramble Games – TRS-80 Color Computer
- The Memory Verse Games – TRS-80 Color Computer
- The Quail Game – TRS-80 Color Computer
- Moses' Rod – TRS-80 Color Computer
- Noah's Ark – TRS-80 Color Computer
- The Church Growth Game – TRS-80 Color Computer
- Heavenly Mansions – TRS-80 Color Computer
- The Exodus Game – TRS-80 Color Computer
- Manna from Heaven – TRS-80 Color Computer
- The Rapture Game – TRS-80 Color Computer
- Daniel & the Lion's Den – TRS-80 Color Computer
- Bible Computer Games – TRS-80 Color Computer

=== 1983 ===
- Bible Computer Games – TI-99/4A, Timex Sinclair
- The Music Machine – Atari 2600
- Bible BASIC: Bible Games for Personal Computers – Apple II, TRS-80, Atari 8-bit, VIC-20, Commodore 64
- Red Sea Crossing – Atari 2600

=== 1984 ===
- Jericho Road – Sinclair Spectrum 48K, Acorn Electron
- Galilee – Sinclair Spectrum 48K
- Bible Computer Games – CP/M, VIC-20, Commodore 64, Apple IIe
- Dawn Treader – Commodore 64, Apple II
- Narnia – Commodore 64, Apple II
- Computer Bible Games – Book 1 – TI-99/4A, Timex Sinclair, TRS-80 Color Computer
- Right Again – Commodore 64, Apple II
- The Baker Street Kids: Series 1 – Commodore 64, Apple II
  - Early Heroes of the Bible
  - Searching for a King
  - The Boy Jesus
  - The Early Church

=== 1986 ===
- The Baker Street Kids: Series 2 – Commodore 64, Apple II
  - Moses and the Wilderness Wanderings
  - A Week That Changed the World
  - Paul's Missionary Journeys
  - Israel's Golden Years
- Bible Computer Games – BibleBytes & PC Enterprises – MS-DOS

== 1990–1999 ==
=== 1991 ===
- Bible Adventures – NES
- Exodus: Journey to the Promised Land – NES
- King of Kings: The Early Years – NES

=== 1992 ===
- Bible Builder – MS-DOS
- Exodus: Journey to the Promised Land – MS-DOS, Game Boy
- Joshua & the Battle of Jericho – NES
- Noah's Ark – NES
- Spiritual Warfare – NES
- Onesimus: A Quest for Freedom – MS-DOS
- Defender of the Faith: The Adventures of David – MS-DOS

=== 1993 ===
- Exodus: Journey to the Promised Land – Sega Genesis
- Bible Buffet – NES

=== 1994 ===
- Captain Bible in Dome of Darkness – MS-DOS
- King James Bible – Game Boy
- Spiritual Warfare – Game Boy
- Spiritual Warfare – Sega Genesis
- Super 3D Noah's Ark – MS-DOS, Super NES

=== 1995 ===
- Sunday Funday – NES
- Bible Adventures – Sega Genesis

=== 1996 ===
- Best of Bible Study and Games – MS-DOS, Windows
- NIV Bible & the 20 Lost Levels of Joshua – Game Boy

=== 1998 ===
- Heaven Quest – Windows

=== 1999 ===
- The War in Heaven – Windows
- Saints of Virtue – Windows

== 2000–2009 ==
=== 2000 ===
- Catechumen – Windows
- Bible Touchdown – Windows
- Desafios da Biblia – Windows
- Children's Bible Stories – Windows
- Prayer Warriors A.O.F.G. – Windows

=== 2001 ===
- Ominous Horizons: A Paladin's Calling – Windows
- Nacah – Windows

=== 2002 ===
- Stronghold: Crusader – Windows
- VeggieTales: The Mystery of Veggie Island – Windows
- Jonah: A VeggieTales Game – Windows
- VeggieTales: Veggie Carnival – Windows

=== 2003 ===
- Isles of Derek – Windows
- Redemption: Victory at Hebron – Windows
- Eternal War: Shadows of Light – Windows
- Bongo Loves the Bible – Windows
- Galilee Flyer – Windows
- Joseph's Story – Windows
- Victory at Hebron – Windows
- VeggieTales Creativity City – Windows

=== 2004 ===
- The Interactive Parables – Windows
- The Walls of Jericho – Windows
- VeggieTales: Minnesota Cuke and the Coconut Apes – Windows
- Noah's Adventures – Windows
- Doom 3 – Windows

=== 2005 ===
- Dance Praise – Windows, Mac
- The Bible Game – PlayStation 2, Xbox
- The Bible Game – Game Boy Advance
- Adventures in Odyssey and the Great Escape – Windows, Mac
- Adventures in Odyssey and the Treasure of the Incas – Windows, Mac
- Light Rangers: Mending the Maniac Madness – Windows, Mac
- VeggieTales Super Silly Fun! – Windows
- The Chronicles of Narnia: The Lion, the Witch and the Wardrobe – PlayStation 2, Xbox, Windows, GameCube
- The Chronicles of Narnia: The Lion, the Witch and the Wardrobe – Nintendo DS
- The Chronicles of Narnia: The Lion, the Witch and the Wardrobe – Game Boy Advance

=== 2006 ===
- Left Behind: Eternal Forces – Windows
- LarryBoy and the Bad Apple – PlayStation 2
- LarryBoy and the Bad Apple – Game Boy Advance
- Timothy and Titus – Windows
- VeggieTales Dance Dance Dance – Windows
- Axys Adventures: Truth Seeker – Windows
- Las Parábolas Interactivas (Spanish version of The Interactive Parables) – Windows
- Deliverance Moses in Pharaoh's courts – Windows

=== 2007 ===
- Dance Praise 2: The ReMix – Windows, Mac
- Left Behind: Tribulation Forces – Windows
- Charlie Church Mouse: Early Elementary – Windows
- Charlie Church Mouse: Kindergarten – Windows
- Charlie Church Mouse: Preschool – Windows
- VeggieTales: Veg-Out! Family Tournament – Game Wave Family Entertainment System
- The Zoo Race – Windows

=== 2008 ===
- Guitar Praise – Windows, Mac
- Adventures in Odyssey and the Sword of the Spirit – Windows, Mac
- Tomb of Moses – Windows
- Attack of the Sunday School Zombies – Windows
- Faith Through the Roof – Windows
- 5 Loaves, 2 Fishes – Windows
- The Chronicles of Narnia: Prince Caspian – PlayStation 2, PlayStation 3, Wii, Windows, Xbox 360
- The Chronicles of Narnia: Prince Caspian – Nintendo DS
- The Chronicles of Narnia: Prince Caspian – J2ME
- The You Testament – Windows

=== 2009 ===
- Adam's Venture – Windows
- Interactive Bible: James – Windows
- VeggieTales Just for Me Personalized App – iOS

== 2010–2019 ==
=== 2010 ===
- Left Behind 3: Rise of the Antichrist – Windows
- Testament – Windows
- Interactive Bible: 1st Peter – Windows
- Interactive Bible: 2nd Peter – Windows
- The Chronicles of Narnia: The Voyage of the Dawn Treader – J2ME

=== 2011 ===
- Interactive Bible: 1st Timothy – Windows
- Interactive Bible: 2nd Timothy – Windows
- The Story of Noah's Ark – Nintendo DS
- Left Behind 4: World at War – Windows
- The Pilgrim's Progress – Windows
- Praise Champion – Windows
- VeggieTales: Step-by-Story presents: The Goofy Gift – iOS

=== 2012 ===
- Bible Trivia: Avatar Edition – Xbox 360
- Charlie Church Mouse 3D Bible Adventures – Windows, iOS
- Interactive Bible: Philippians – Windows
- Interactive Bible: Colossians – Windows
- GLOW: Guardian Light Of the World – Windows, Android
- Journey of Jesus: The Calling – browser-based
- Praise Champion 2 – Windows
- VeggieTales Spotisodes Collection – iOS
- VeggieTales: Step-by-Story presents: Larry's Missing Music – iOS
- VeggieTales: Step-by-Story presents: Thanks for the Franks – iOS

=== 2013 ===
- Jesus Christ RPG – Windows
- Incredible Islands MMO – Windows, Mac
- Baby Jesus Christ RPG – Windows
- Rise Jesus Christ RPG – Windows
- Scribble My VeggieTales Story – iOS
- VeggieTales: It's a Very Merry Larry Christmas – iOS

=== 2014 ===
- The Great Bible Race – Windows, Mac
- Bible ABCs for Kids – iOS, Android
- Interactive Bible: Letters of John – Windows
- King Solomon's Word Challenge – Windows
- Super Bible Trivia – Windows
- Throne And Crown – Android, Kongregate

=== 2015 ===
- Stained Glass – iOS
- Buddy Quest – Windows, Android, iOS
- Five: Guardians of David – Windows
- Noah's Bunny Problem – iOS, Android
- Adam's Venture: Chronicles – PlayStation 3
- All Aboard the Ark – Android
- VeggieTales Animated Devotional – iOS

=== 2016 ===
- G Prime: Into the Rain – Xbox One
- That Dragon, Cancer – Windows, Mac, Linux, iOS, Android, Ouya
- Sheep Master – iOS, Android
- Heroes of Issachar – Windows, Mac
- FIVE: Champions of Canaan – Windows
- Adam's Venture: Origins – Windows, Xbox One, PlayStation 4
- The Aetherlight: Chronicles of the Resistance – Windows, iOS, Android

=== 2017 ===
- Noah's Elephant in the Room – iOS, Android
- Lightgliders – iOS, Android, Windows and browser-based
- Bible Gems – Android
- Bible Crush – Android
- Superbook Bible Trivia Game – iOS, Android
- Faith: The Unholy Trinity – Windows

=== 2018 ===
- Alpha/Omega: The Christian RPG – Windows, Mac, Linux, Android
- Pangolin's Puzzle – iOS, Android
- NIMCOR3: RPG – Windows
- The You Testament: 2D Coming – iOS, Android

=== 2019 ===
- To Light: Ex Umbra – Windows, Mac
- Airship Genesis: Pathway to Jesus – iOS, Android
- The Secrets of Jesus – Windows, Linux
- Super Pionero – Android

== 2020–present ==
=== 2020 ===
- Lucifer – Paradise Lost – Windows
- Adam's Venture: Origins – Nintendo Switch
- LOGOS Bible Video Game – Windows, Mac, Linux

=== 2021 ===
- Our Church and Halloween RPG series – PlayStation 4
- Bible Quest: Prosperity – Windows

=== 2022 ===
- Didactic Jesus Game, RPG – Windows, iOS, Android
- Adventures of the Old Testament – Windows, Mac, Linux
- Synaxarion: Acts Part 1 – Nintendo Switch

=== 2023 ===
- Interactive Bible: Mark – Windows
- TruPlay Games – Android, iOS
- In His Time – Windows, Mac

=== 2024 ===
- The Pilgrim's Progress – Windows
- Family Bible Quest – Windows, Android

=== 2025 ===
- Sea Cross: Bible Game – browser-based
- and Roger – Windows, Mac, Nintendo Switch

=== 2026 ===
- I Am Jesus Christ – Windows

== See also ==
- List of Christian films
- List of Christian animations
- Religion and video games
