= Spiritual Warfare (video game) =

1992 video game

- Developer(s): Wisdom Tree
- Publisher(s): Wisdom Tree; Piko Interactive (digital)
- Engine: Crystal Mines
- Platform(s): NES; Sega Genesis; Game Boy; MS-DOS; Windows; OS X; Linux
- Release: 1992
- Genre(s): Adventure/Christian
- Mode(s): Single-player

Spiritual Warfare is a 1992 Christian video game developed by Wisdom Tree for the Nintendo Entertainment System, it was later ported to MS-DOS, Game Boy, and Sega Genesis, and re-released as a part of the Spiritual Warfare & Wisdom Tree Collection in 2017 on Steam for Microsoft Windows, Mac OS X, and Linux. The game was not officially licensed by Nintendo for the NES, so it was mostly sold in Christian bookstores instead of traditional video game retailers.

== Gameplay ==
NES screenshot of the overworld

Spiritual Warfare is presented in a top-down perspective, similar to action-adventure game The Legend of Zelda.

The player controls a Christian as he traverses an overworld with various environments. Areas of the game include a park, a downtown, an airport, a warehouse district, a hotel district, a shipyard, a residential area, a junkyard, a beach, some woods, and a prison which sits upon the final demon stronghold level.

During the gameplay, angels can be encountered that give power-ups and educational video game style Bible trivia quizzes. The game has two forms of attack, a simple wind-and-dust bomb (similar to the feng chen pao depicted in the Huolongjing) and the main weapon features role-playing levels in the form of the Fruits of the Holy Spirit, represented by five fruits: pears, pomegranates, apples, grapes and bananas. The in-game currency is a dove peace symbol.

The player defeats enemies by harnessing the fruits to save souls from demons, and using the currency of peace to add more Fruits of the Spirit to their arsenal. In order to free the town of the influences of "ultimate source of evil", the player must collect each of the six pieces of the Armor of God, which are guarded by bosses. Along the way, the player may collect other helpful biblical items such as Samson's Jawbone and Anointing Oil.

== Re-release ==
The game was ported in 2017 to Steam and Humble Bundle by Piko Interactive using DOSBox, as the main featured title in the Spiritual Warfare & Wisdom Tree Collection which featured the MS-DOS version of Spiritual Warfare, Bible Adventures, Exodus, and Joshua & the Battle of Jericho.

== See also ==
- Christian media
- Demonology
- Spiritual warfare
- Territorial spirit
