= Multicart =

Video game cartridge containing more than one game

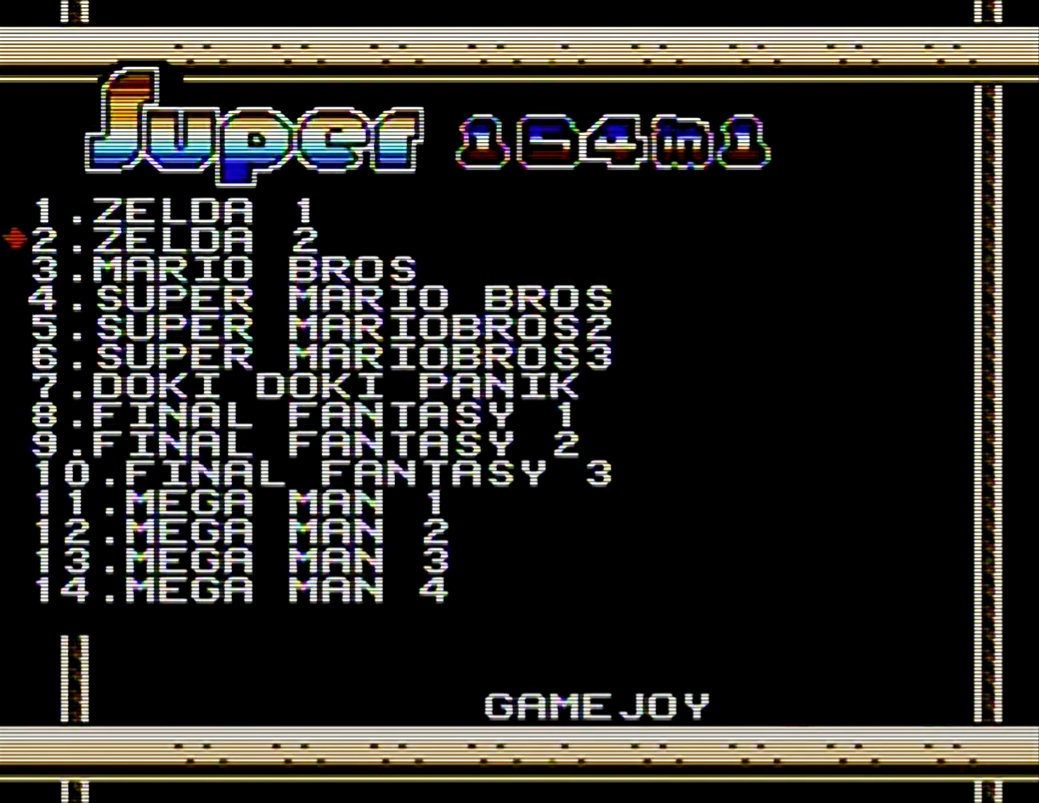
A pirate multicart released for a famiclone

In video game parlance, a multicart is a cartridge that contains more than one game. Typically, the separate games are available individually for purchase (such as Sega Smash Pack) or were previously available individually (such as Final Fantasy I & II: Dawn of Souls). For this reason, collections, anthologies, and compilations are considered multicarts. The desirability of the multicart to consumers is that it provides better value, greater convenience, and (in the case of portable games) more portability than the separate games would provide. The advantage to developers is that it allows two or more smaller games to be sold together for the price of one larger game, and also provides an opportunity to repackage and sell older games one more time, often with little or no changes.

Multicarts are distinct from minigame series such as Mario Party, Game & Watch Gallery, or WarioWare. These games consist of several minigames specifically created for the overall game experience. In contrast, the NES multicart Super Mario Bros./Duck Hunt contains two full-version games, each available for purchase individually.

Although most commonly associated with NES and SNES, both authorized and unauthorized, multicarts have appeared for many cartridge-based systems, including the Atari 2600, Intellivision, Odyssey 2, Master System, Sega Genesis, Vectrex, and Game Boy. As storage capacity on cartridges continued to grow and become less expensive, the popularity of multicarts saw a resurgence on the only remaining cartridge-based systems in the mid-2005s, those of Nintendo’s Game Boy Advance and DS. Those systems had seen an increase in “2-in-1” and “3-in-1” games, with some re-releasing popular titles previously seen on the same platform, such as Konami's Castlevania. Currently, the Nintendo Switch and Switch 2 are the primary existing consoles that use cartridges.

== Pirate multicarts ==
Among pirate Famicom games, multicarts often advertise an inflated number of games on their labels, calling them "x-in-1" (x can be any number greater than 1, such as "76-in-1," "200-in-1," "1200-in-1," and even "9999999-in-1"), but in reality usually only have anywhere from five to one hundred truly unique games. The list is padded by different variations of these games, modified to start the player either at different levels or with different power-ups. The games are usually first-generation Famicom titles, several of which were never officially released outside of Japan, and in typical pirate fashion have either had their names deliberately misspelled, their copyright notices/logos removed, or both.

Other popular video game systems have their own share of unique pirate multicarts. Unlike the Famicom, the Nintendo Game Boy multicarts have a variety of different, innovative multicart designs. Standard-sized Game Boy multicarts have either a game selection menu like the NES multicarts, or require quick toggling of the Game Boy power switch to select through games. Most of them incorporate an external soft reset button (not available on any original cart), so you can reset the game without powering off the system. Huge pirate carts were created to overcome the storage limitations of a standard-sized pirate cart. These unusually large and thick carts, more than twice the height and depth of a standard Game Boy cartridge, could easily store many of the larger new games, such as Donkey Kong Land. One drawback of these carts is that they lack any battery backup, but some newer carts come with battery backup, so saving games on them is impossible if the battery backup is not included. Most of these carts were produced in China, Taiwan, and Hong Kong.

There have been Game Boy Advance multicarts with several GBA games and several or even hundreds of NES ROMs. These carts are known to include some bootlegs, hacks, or variations of games, advertising them as different games and giving them incorrect box art on the main box art.

== Unlicensed multicarts ==
These multicarts were published with the consent of the owners of copyright in the games themselves, but without the console maker's consent:

- Action 52, from Active Enterprises. This ambitious project attempted to put 52 unique games into a single cartridge, but shoddy programming and heavy code reuse between games, combined with a hefty $200 (USD) retail price, resulted in this game often being considered one of the worst multicarts.
- Caltron 6-in-1 - Rare vintage NES multicart, later re-released as the Myriad 6 in 1
  - MaxPlay Classic Games Volume 1
- Maxivision 15-in-1, which contained fifteen games from unlicensed NES manufacturers such as Color Dreams and American Video Entertainment.
- The North American versions of the Quattro series by Codemasters, published by Camerica
- Wisdom Tree compilations:
  - Bible Adventures - This three-in-one Game Boy cartridge featured Noah's Ark, Baby Moses, and David and Goliath.
  - King James Bible - This included the King James Version Bible in e-book format, plus Bible Word Match and Bible Shepherd.
  - King of Kings: The Early Years - This three-in-one NES cartridge featured The Wise Men, Flight to Egypt, and Jesus and the Temple.
  - NIV Bible & the 20 Lost Levels of Joshua - This included the New International Version Bible in e-book format, plus Bible Word Match, Bible Shepherd and Joshua: The Lost Levels. The latter is a port of Joshua & the Battle of Jericho for the Game Boy, featuring 20 levels not available in the NES version.
  - Sunday Funday - The last NES game released commercially in the United States for several years, this three-in-one cartridge featured the title game (a graphics hack of Color Dreams's old Menace Beach), Fish Fall (a previously unreleased puzzle game), and a karaoke program featuring a Christian pop song, "The Ride," by 4Him.

== Official multicarts ==
=== Atari 2600 ===
- 32 in 1: Only released in Europe (PAL systems) contains Atari's early hits such as Blackjack, Boxing, and Combat
- 2005 Minigame Multicart: Published by AtariAge well after the end of the 2600s lifespan, this collection includes seven entries of the 2005 MiniGame Competition.

=== Nintendo Entertainment System ===
- Donkey Kong Classics: Contains Donkey Kong and Donkey Kong Junior
- Final Fantasy I-II
- Super Mario Bros./Duck Hunt
- Sesame Street A-B-C and 1-2-3
- Short Order/Eggsplode
- Super Mario Bros. / Duck Hunt / World Class Track Meet
- Super Mario Bros. / Tetris / Nintendo World Cup (PAL)
- Super Spike V'Ball/Nintendo World Cup

=== Master System ===
- Arcade Smash Hits: includes Atari's Centipede, Breakout, and Missile Command
- Hang-On/Safari Hunt: Dual cart bundled with Sega Master System sets.
- Hang-On/Astro Warrior: Dual cart bundled with Master System "Base System" sets (those without the Sega Light Phaser gun).
- Marksman Shooting & Trap Shooting: Contains two games for the Master System light gun, the Light Phaser. A third game, Safari Hunt, was included in the European release.

Sega-released Master System multicarts were labeled "The Combo Cartridge" on the box, as opposed to the "Mega Cartridge" and "Two-Mega Cartridge" labels placed on single-game cart boxes.

=== Mega Drive/Genesis ===
- 6-Pak: Includes Columns, Golden Axe, The Revenge of Shinobi, Sonic the Hedgehog, Streets of Rage, and Super Hang-On
- Arcade Classics: - features Atari's Centipede, Missile Command, and Pong.
- Game no Kanzume Otokuyou: Includes 16t, Flicky, Putter Golf, Hyper Marbles, Shi no Meikyuu, Medal City, Paddle Fighter, Doki Doki Penguin Land MD, Pyramid Magic, Robot Battler, Teddy Boy Blues, and Aworg. Available only on the Japanese Sega Channel and the Japanese Mega Drive Mini. The official name in English is Value Games in a Can.
- MegaGames 3 in 1 - Vol 1: Includes Columns, Super Hang-On, and World Cup Italia '90. Released in North America as Triple Score: 3 Games In 1
- MegaGames 3 in 1 - Vol 2: Includes Golden Axe, Streets of Rage, and The Revenge of Shinobi
- MegaGames 3 in 1 - Vol 3: Includes Super Thunder Blade, Alien Storm, and Super Monaco GP
- Classic Collection (MegaGames 4 in 1): Includes Flicky, Gunstar Heroes, Alex Kidd in the Enchanted Castle, and Altered Beast
- MegaGames 6 - Vol 1: Includes Golden Axe, Streets of Rage, The Revenge of Shinobi, Columns, Super Hang-On, and World Cup Italia '90
- MegaGames 6 - Vol 2: Includes Super Thunder Blade, Alien Storm, Super Monaco GP, Super Hang-On, World Cup Italia '90, and Columns
- Mega 6 - Vol 3: Includes Columns, The Revenge of Shinobi, Sonic the Hedgehog, Streets of Rage, Super Monaco GP, and Sega Soccer
- Mega Man: The Wily Wars: Includes remade versions of Mega Man, Mega Man 2, and Mega Man 3, as well as an unlockable exclusive bonus game called Wily Tower.
- Menacer 6-game cartridge: Included with Sega's lightgun accessory, contains 6 original shooting games
- Pac-Man 2: The New Adventures: Includes Pac-Man and Pac-Jr., playable by entering a password or going to the Arcade. The latter of which is an exclusive remake of Ms. Pac-Man that requires three cartridges hidden.
- Sonic Compilation: Includes Sonic the Hedgehog, Sonic the Hedgehog 2, and Dr. Robotnik's Mean Bean Machine. Released in North America as Sonic Classics
- Sega Top Ten: Includes Columns, Sonic the Hedgehog, Super Monaco GP, The Revenge of Shinobi, Streets of Rage, Golden Axe, Super Hang-On, World Cup Italia '90, California Games, Flicky. Released in Brazil by Tectoy and released by Sega in Asian Countries under the name of Mega Games 10

=== Game Boy ===
- Dragon Warrior I & II: contains remade versions of the NES titles
- Galaga & Galaxian: contains the two arcade classics.
- 4-in-1 Funpack, Volume 1
- 4-in-1 Funpack, Volume 2
- Bo Jackson: 2 Games in 1: Contains football and baseball games
- Centipede & Millipede
- Defender & Joust
- Namco Gallery compilations:
  - Vol. 1 includes Battle City, Galaga, Mappy, and Namco Classic.
  - Vol. 2 includes Galaxian, Dig Dug, The Tower of Druaga, and Famista 4. The last of which is an original game.
  - Vol. 3 includes Sky Kid, The Tower of Babel, Family Tennis and Jantaku Boy.
- Konami GB Collection compilations:
  - Vol. 1 includes Nemesis, Castlevania: The Adventure, F1 Spirit, and Operation C.
  - Vol. 2 (released in PAL as Vol. 3) includes Twinbee Da!!, Ganbare Goemon: Sarawareta Ebisumaru!, Motocross Maniacs, and Guttang Gottong.
  - Vol. 3 (released in PAL as Vol. 4) includes Nemesis II, Castlevania II: Belmont's Revenge, Yie Ar Kung-Fu, and Antarctic Adventure.
  - Vol. 4 (released in PAL as Vol. 2) includes Parodius Da!, Quarth, Track & Field, and Frogger.

=== Game Boy Color ===
- Super Mario Bros. Deluxe: contains Super Mario Bros. and Super Mario Bros.: The Lost Levels. The latter of which requires 300,000 points in the former.
- Pac-Man: Special Color Edition: includes Pac-Man and Pac-Attack.
- Ms. Pac-Man: Special Color Edition: includes Ms. Pac-Man and Super Pac-Man.

=== Game Gear ===
- Arcade Classics: features Atari's Centipede, Missile Command and Pong.
- Sega Game Pack 4 in 1: a collection of four video games released by Sega in 1992 for the Game Gear and was generally included with new consoles in Europe. The games include a variation of Columns, Penalty Shootout, Championship Tennis, and Pan American Road Rally. This cartridge was only available in Europe.

=== Super NES ===
- Nichibutsu Arcade Classics: Contains Moon Cresta and Crazy Climber and Frisky Tom.
- Nichibutsu Collection 1: Contains Gionbana and Kouryaku Casino Bar.
- Nichibutsu Collection 2: Contains Super Gomoku Shougi and Mahjong Hanjouki.
- Ninja Gaiden Trilogy: Contains the three NES Ninja Gaiden games with an improved color palette and a remixed (and slightly reordered) soundtrack.
- Pac-Man 2: The New Adventures: Includes Pac-Man and Ms. Pac-Man, playable by entering a password or going to the Arcade. The latter of which requires three cartridges hidden.
- Super Mario All-Stars: Includes remade versions of the three Super Mario Bros. games on the NES, as well as the Japanese version of Super Mario Bros. 2 (retitled Super Mario Bros.: The Lost Levels). These games featured remixed soundtracks of their NES/Famicom counterparts.
- Super Mario All-Stars + Super Mario World (in Europe: Super Mario All-Stars and Super Mario World): Includes all the games from Super Mario All-Stars, and Super Mario World. It was released only in North America and Europe. In North America, it was exclusively a pack-in game for the Super NES Mario Set.
- Super Scope 6: Contains six games for the Super Scope.
- Tetris & Dr. Mario: Contains enhanced remakes of Tetris (1989) and Dr. Mario (1990)
- Williams Arcade's Greatest Hits: Contains Defender, Defender II, Joust, Robotron: 2084, and Sinistar

=== Nintendo 64 ===
- Namco Museum 64: Contains Pac-Man, Ms. Pac-Man, Pole Position, Galaga, Galaxian, and Dig Dug
- Midway's Greatest Arcade Hits: Contains Defender, Sinistar, Robotron: 2084, Joust, Spy Hunter, and Tapper

=== Game Boy Advance ===
- 3-in-1 Sports Pack: contains Paintball Splat, Dodgeball: Dodge This!, and Big Alley Bowling
- Board Game Classics 3-in-1
- Capcom Classics-Mini Mix: contains the NES versions of "Strider", "Mighty Final Fight", and "Bionic Commando"
- Candy Land/Chutes & Ladders/Memory 3-in-1
- Castlevania Double Pack - Aria of Sorrow/Harmony of Dissonance
- Centipede/Breakout/Warlords 3-in-1
- Dora the Explorer: Super Star Adventures/The Search for Pirate Pig's Treasure
- Final Fantasy I & II: Dawn of Souls: contains Final Fantasy I and II.
- The Incredibles & Finding Nemo: The Continuing Adventures
- The Legend of Zelda: A Link to the Past & Four Swords
- Gauntlet [arcade, but single-player] & Rampart [arcade]
- Looney Tunes Double Pack
- Madagascar and Shrek 2
- Majesco's Rec Room Challenge: contains Darts, Roll-a-Ball, and Shuffle Bowl
- Marble Madness & Klax
- Mario & Luigi: Superstar Saga; contains the title game and Mario Bros.
- Metroid: Zero Mission; contains the title game and Metroid
- Mother 1+2; contains the first two games of the Mother series (known as Earthbound in the United States).
- Namco Museum: contains Pole Position, Galaga, Galaxian, Ms. Pac-Man, and Dig Dug
- Namco Museum 50th Anniversary: contains Pac-Man, Rally-X, Galaga, Ms. Pac-Man, and Dig Dug
- Pac-Man Collection: contains Pac-Man, Pac-Attack, Pac-Man Arrangement, and Pac-Mania
- Paperboy and Rampage
- Phantasy Star Collection: contains Phantasy Star I, II, and III.
- Pong, Asteroids, Yar’s Revenge
- Prince of Persia: The Sands of Time / Tomb Raider: The Prophecy (Europe only)
- Rayman 10th Anniversary: contains Rayman Advance and Rayman 3: Hoodlum Havoc
- Risk/Battleship/Clue 3-in-1
- Scooby-Doo: 2 Game in 1
- Sega Arcade Gallery: After Burner/Space Harrier/Out Run/Super Hang-On
- Sega Smash Pack: contains Ecco the Dolphin, Golden Axe, and Sonic Spinball
- Shark Tale & Shrek (Video)
- Sonic Advance & Sonic Pinball Party
- Spy Hunter/Super Sprint
- Super Mario Advance: contains Super Mario Bros. 2 and Mario Bros.
- Super Mario World: Super Mario Advance 2: contains Super Mario World and Mario Bros.
- Yoshi's Island: Super Mario Advance 3: contains Super Mario World 2: Yoshi's Island and Mario Bros.
- Super Mario Advance 4: Super Mario Bros. 3: contains Super Mario Bros. 3 and Mario Bros.
- Teenage Mutant Ninja Turtles Double Pack: contains Teenage Mutant Ninja Turtles and Teenage Mutant Ninja Turtles 2: Battle Nexus
- Tony Hawk's Underground / Kelly Slater's Pro Surfer
- Yu-Gi-Oh! Double Pack: Reshef of Destruction & The Sacred Cards
- Yu-Gi-Oh! Double Pack 2: Destiny Board Traveler & Dungeon Dice Monsters

=== Nintendo DS ===
- ATV: Thunder Ridge Riders/Monster Trucks Mayhem
- Battleship/Connect Four/Sorry!/Trouble
- Clue/Mouse Trap/Perfection/Aggravation
- Namco Museum DS: contains Xevious, Galaga, Galaxian, Pac-Man, Dig Dug II, The Tower of Druaga, Mappy, Super Xevious, and Pac-Man VS
- Puzzler Collection: contains Crossword, Sudoku, Word Search and Fitword
- Uno/Skipbo/Uno Free Fall 3-in-1
- Sonic Classic Collection: contains Sonic the Hedgehog, Sonic the Hedgehog 2, Sonic the Hedgehog 3, Sonic and Knuckles, Knuckles in Sonic 2, and Sonic 3 and Knuckles
- Mega Man Zero Collection: contains all four games in the Mega Man Zero series.
- Madagascar Kartz & Shrek's Carnival Craze Party Games

=== Nintendo 3DS ===
- Pac-Man & Galaga Dimensions: contains Pac-Man, Galaga, Pac-Man Championship Edition, Galaga Legions, Pac-Man Tilt and Galaga 3D Impact, the last two of which are exclusive to this compilation.
- SEGA 3D Classics Collection (Including Power Drift, Puyo Puyo 2, Sonic The Hedgehog, Galaxy Force II, Helicopter Combat: Thunder Blade, Fantasy Zone II, Altered Beast, Maze Walker, Fantasy Zone II: The Tears Of Opa-Opa)

=== Nintendo Switch ===
- Super Mario 3D All-Stars: contains Super Mario 64, Super Mario Sunshine, and Super Mario Galaxy.
