= Red Sea Crossing (video game) =

1983 video game

- Original cartridge label
- Developers: Steve Stack, Inc.
- Publisher: Inspirational Video Concepts
- Programmer: Steve Schustack
- Platform: Atari 2600
- Release: October 7, 1983
- Genres: Platformer, Christian
- Mode: Single-player

Red Sea Crossing is a Christian side-scrolling video game for the Atari 2600. Released for mail order in 1983 only, it remained unknown until a copy was discovered at a garage sale in 2007. Very few copies have been found as of 2018, making it one of the rarest published console games of the 1980s.

One of the earliest Christian video games, Red Sea Crossing is the first published console game based on an event described in the Bible. It was created and published by an independent programmer without any involvement from Atari, Inc.

== Gameplay ==
Moses jumping over giant clams, while evading a javelin. The fish that represents the time limit can be seen in the top left.

Moses parts the Red Sea and the player directs him between the parted waters. Moses must avoid obstacles such as seaweed and giant clams, as well as the pursuing Egyptians, by precisely timing his movements and jumping.

A fish swimming in the water behind Moses serves as a time limit – he must reach the end of the screen before the fish. Bonus points are awarded for collecting stone tablets or catching doves, and a staff item awards an extra life.

The developer has claimed that the game is winnable, but after 128 screens it appears to reset to level 2. When the player runs out of lives, the Red Sea closes up.

== Development ==
In 1983, Red Sea Crossing was developed independently by Steve Schustack. He developed the game in California using a Franklin ACE computer. He decided to make a Christian video game believing that it could be a marketable niche, but also notes that he enjoys making software for children:

I see children as a terrific market and one many of us are very familiar with [...] Money isn't the only aspect to this; there's plenty of potential satisfaction out there for the grabbing. I like the thought of my young nephews' and nieces' cute little fingers pressing keys, while [the game's] music and animation bring smiles to their faces.

Schustack had between 100 and 500 copies of Red Sea Crossing manufactured. He self-published the game and sold it exclusively through a single magazine advertisement by Michael Nason. The game shipped with a coloring book and an audio cassette tape recorded by Dale Evans Rogers, both about the Exodus. The publisher was named "Inspirational Video Concepts".

Schustack did not continue advertising Red Sea Crossing after the first ad resulted in very few sales and decided against making another Atari game. He has said in retrospect that developing Red Sea Crossing "was a real thrill" and that he felt time pressure to release a game quickly.

== Rediscovery ==
External images
- The Christianity Today advertisement for Red Sea Crossing
- A reproduction copy of Red Sea Crossing, with new artwork, distributed by a 2012 auction winner

A copy was found at a Cincinnati rummage sale in 2007, and the discovery of the unattested game proved controversial. Users of the AtariAge forum identified Schustack as the developer and contacted him; he recalled advertising the game in an unspecified religious magazine. In 2011, an advertisement for Red Sea Crossing was found in a 1983 issue of Christianity Today, finally verifying the game.

Calls for the finder, who was not a video game collector, to sell the game increased after another alleged found copy was discovered to be a hoax. The finder scheduled an auction in 2012. Days before the auction was to occur, a genuine second copy of Red Sea Crossing was discovered by a Philadelphia thrift store owner. The auction was carried out after a deferment, and the game sold for $10,400. The second copy was also auctioned in 2012 for $13,877, with the higher price attributed to growing media awareness of the game and the cartridge being in better physical condition.

One of the buyers used the game cartridge to create reproduction copies for collectors and the ROM image is now readily available online. The coloring book and cassette tape originally packaged with Red Sea Crossing have not resurfaced and may be lost. Two additional original copies of Red Sea Crossing were found by 2018, bringing the total to four. One of the cartridges, with a missing end label, was sold for a lower price than was seen in the 2012 auctions.

== See also ==
- Bobby is Going Home
- Christian media
- Exodus: Journey to the Promised Land
- Wisdom Tree
