= Game Studio =

Game Studio may refer to:

- Video game developer (game studio), a company specialized in the development of video games
- Game Studio (company), a game studio headquartered in Tokyo, Japan
- 3D GameStudio, a 3D game engine
- GameMaker Studio, a 2D game engine originally developed by Mark Overmars
