= Thane Krios =

Fictional character in the Mass Effect video game series

- Mass Effect character
- Thane as he appears in Mass Effect 2
- First appearance: Mass Effect 2 (2010)
- Last appearance: Mass Effect: Foundation (2014)
- Created by: BioWare
- Voiced by: Keythe Farley

In-universe information
- Race: Drell
- Spouse: Irikah Krios
- Children: Kolyat Krios (son)
- Home: Kahje; The Citadel
- Class: Assassin
- Skill: Biotics

Thane Krios is a fictional character in BioWare's Mass Effect franchise, who first appeared in Mass Effect 2 as a party member (or "squadmate"). The character is a drell, a race of extraterrestrial reptilian humanoids who form a sociopolitical alliance with the hanar, a sentient species of jellyfish-like entities. Thane Krios is voiced by Keythe Farley in the video game series.

A notorious professional assassin, Thane may be recruited by Shepard in the planet Illium for a "suicide mission" to stop the abduction of human colonists by a mysterious species known as the Collectors. He candidly reveals to Shepard during their first meeting that he is dying of Kepral's Syndrome, a genetic respiratory disease that will ultimately lead to lung failure, but willingly joins the suicide mission. The character also appears in Mass Effect 3, the final game in the trilogy, where his condition has worsened. Thane makes further appearances in two issues of the Mass Effect: Foundation limited comic series, which take place prior to the events of the trilogy.

The character is critically acclaimed and well received by critics and fans, with attention drawn to his complex characterization and as a positive depiction of a character with disabilities and openly religious video game character. Thane has featured prominently in promotional art, demo footage, trailers and advertisements for Mass Effect 2.

== Character overview ==
Thane's request to be released from the Compact with his hanar handler, so that he could settle down with his family.

Thane was raised on the ocean planet of Kahje, the homeworld of the hanar, a species known for their strict adherence to polite speech and proper etiquette. A few centuries before the events of the original Mass Effect trilogy, the hanar evacuated a portion of the drell species from their dying homeworld Rakhana and transported them to Kahje. In gratitude to the hanar for saving them from extinction, the remnants of the drell people pledged their loyalty and service to the hanar as a client race, the two races establishing a symbiotic cultural relationship known as the Compact. The drell are integrated into every level of hanar society and usually assist with many tasks the hanar may find physically difficult to perform even with mechanical aid, such as combat or assassinations. The drell consider their service to the hanar an honor, regardless of the nature of the task. Thane possesses eidetic memory, a genetic trait typical of the drell species. An external stimulus may trigger an involuntary memory recall, which are so vivid and detailed that some drell may mistake it for reality. Thane occasionally loses himself reliving the perfect recall of some of his memories and can describe them in flawless detail.

Thane was first trained by his hanar masters as an assassin since he was six, making his first assassination by the time he reached twelve. To achieve his goals, Thane utilizes a mixture of stealth, firearms, hand-to-hand combat techniques, and biotic powers. He met his wife during an assassination mission when she stepped in front of Thane's target in order to stop him. He decided to settle down with her and left the service of his hanar masters through a voluntary severance of their Compact relationship. Thane's wife was later murdered by mercenaries who were pursuing her husband. This event caused him to abandon their young son Kolyat, a decision that still haunts him. Instead of adopting the hanar worship of the Protheans like some of his brethren, Thane is a devotee of the old polytheistic religion of his species, and spends much of his time in prayer and meditation, even within his work. Thane prays before each mission and asks for forgiveness from his gods after each kill. On the other hand, Thane is unwavering in his determination to separate his moral conscience from the killing he has committed, and that they aren't anything he bears guilt for; according to drell religious teachings, the body and soul are separate, thus the person who hires him bears the guilt as his body is merely their tool. The player can discuss with him in great detail about his beliefs, and may even be invited by Thane to pray with him. Cassidee Moser, writing for Gamesradar, called Thane's prayer to the drell deity Amonkira a summation of his humble and loyal personality.

Thane is a possible romantic interest for a female player character, Commander Shepard in Mass Effect 2. While the relationship itself does not carry forward into Mass Effect 3 due to the conclusion of his story arc, the player has the choice to spend private time with him at the Citadel hospital as his health deteriorates.

== Concept and design ==
Thane's writer for Mass Effect 2 was Chris L'Etoile, who left the team prior to the completion of the game's development. One of Thane's dialogue wheel choices as part of his romance subplot event tree has attained notoriety for its awkward dialogue paraphrase, as the game's dialogue choices lacked explicit icons to identify their intent for the player's benefit. Trick Weekes, who was responsible for the character's dialogue paraphrase, attributed it to a combination of a tight development schedule, bug reports, and the constraints of 2000s game development, as team members did not have the benefit of support from downloadable game patches at the time. Weekes' view of Thane's Kepral’s Syndrome is that it is similar to the real-life disease cystic fibrosis. Chris Hepler took over as Thane's writer for Mass Effect 3.

Various thumbnail drawings for early Thane concepts. Concept artists were given as much freedom as possible early in the development cycle of Mass Effect 2.

According to art director Derek Watts, Thane was the hardest character to design for Mass Effect 2. BioWare started with a written description of Thane, and wanted to emphasise him as a "career assassin" while keeping him attractive as a possible romantic interest for female players. They asked the women in the office what they "liked" in their aliens. Concept artists began by drawing on lizards and birds-of-paradise for inspiration. It was considered giving Thane's face a "mannequin-like, 'perfect human' appearance", and a red mark was considered as a possible key feature for the character. Feedback was received from the women in the office who found the character "creepy", and as the character was a romantic interest the mannequin-face was decided to be too "off-putting". The team went "back to the drawing board", with Thane later becoming a mix of "aquatic" and "reptilian" characteristics. Thane ultimately went through eight or nine "phases" before his design was finalised. The character was originally intended to have three metal earrings on the sides of his head, but the developers forgot to include this in his model.

Once his face had been set, BioWare began work on Thane's body, which Watts recalls as a less "exhausting" experience than designing Thane's head. Debates were had over whether Thane should wear tight assassin-appropriate clothing or a loose jacket that evoked the feeling of a professional. Early on, the developers tried to remove his jacket over animation concerns. However, these attempts were considered to ruin his whole design. His "balaclava-style" helmets tried to reflect his criminal background by imitating ski masks. Artists experimented with jewellery. The Thane in-game solely has a necklace.

Joe Skrebels from IGN was of the opinion that Thane's final appearance bears a resemblance to Abe Sapien from the Hellboy series.

== Appearances ==
Thane is first encountered on the regional asari hub world Illium, where he had been based for the past two years planning the assassinate an asari named Nassana Dantius. He joins Shepard on a pro bono basis following his successful assassination of Dantius, stating that he has nothing left to lose, and he hopes to right many wrongs he has found in the galaxy before his death. Thane's story revolves around his son, Kolyat, and his desire to rescue him from a life of crime. Shepard and team must travel to the Citadel to stop Kolyat from following in his father's footsteps and taking up the career of assassination. Kolyat's contracted target is a racist turian politician who extorts human rackets while promising to reduce crime in the Citadel Wards. After the mission is completed, Thane will talk to his son and attempts to make things right with him; Thane will then become a loyal member of Shepard's team.

If the player pursues a relationship with Thane, he will tell Shepard that he has not talked of his past to anyone until he met her, and that she is "very kind." As the relationship progresses, Thane will open up his feelings for Shepard and call her "siha", one of the angels in Drell religion. Before the suicide mission, Thane will go up to Shepard's cabin and tell her that before he was diagnosed with his disease, he had no fear of death. But now that he has met Shepard, he is afraid of death and does not want to die. Thane begins to shed tears, but Shepard comforts him, and the two spend the night together.

Thane returns in Mass Effect 3 provided he survived the events of Mass Effect 2. Thane appears in the hospital on the Citadel, and tells Shepard he is now in the terminal stages of his illness and cannot join Shepard in the fight against the Reapers. Later on in the game Cerberus attacks the Citadel and Thane, if he was interacted with beforehand, assists Shepard in thwarting an assassination attempt on the salarian Councilor and is stabbed by assassin Kai Leng whom escapes. If neither Thane nor Kirrahe (who may serve as Thane's placeholder in the story arc) are alive, Kai Leng will be successful in his assassinating the salarian Councilor.

After the remaining Cerberus forces have been routed, Shepard visits Thane in the hospital where doctors tell Shepard that due to his blood loss and his illness is in the final stages, there is nothing else they can do but to comfort him during his final moments. If Thane has reconciled with Kolyat in Mass Effect 2, he will be present by his father's deathbed, and Thane asks him and Shepard to recite a prayer. As Kolyat and Shepard recite the prayer, Thane passes away. Kolyat will reveal that Thane's prayer was not meant for himself, but for Shepard. Thane's name will be added to the Normandy SR-2's memorial wall on the Crew Deck area after his death in either Mass Effect 2 or 3, alongside other crew members who have fallen.

In the Mass Effect 3: Citadel DLC, Shepard may hold a memorial service for Thane at their apartment. Following the service, Shepard could also view some video recordings made by Thane addressed to Shepard. If romanced, Shepard will talk to Thane in their mind one last time.

== Critical reception ==
Thane's critical reception has been very positive. The character won the award for IGN's best Xbox 360 character of 2010; IGN called him "easily the most fully realized character in the supporting cast" of Mass Effect 2. Writing for GameZone, Dakota Grabowski listed Thane as the fifth best BioWare companion. Grabowski praised the character's design as well as how much was how parts of him were "open for interpretation". IGN's Steven Hopper listed him as the sixth best Mass Effect companion, saying he had "one of the most engaging story arcs" in Mass Effect 2 and crediting his complexity. GRY Online included Thane in their list of the best assassins in video games in a 2015 article. PC Gamer staff ranked him the fifth best Mass Effect companion in a 2016 article. Tom Marks remarked the internal conflict present in Thane makes him compelling as a sidekick, calling him the "personification of Shepard’s own Paragon and Renegade choices, and is the literal representation of their team marching slowly toward almost certain death". He also praised Thane's "gravelly voice", while another staff member rated the character for his perceived sex appeal. Ben Griffins said Thane is one of his favourite BioWare companions, and that everything about the character is "fascinating" to him. However, Tim Clark dislikes Thane and called him "just a big green cloud of glum".

The character has been cited as a fan favorite, with commentary focused on emotional investment by players towards the character's fate. GamesTM called him one of BioWare's eight most memorable companions, drawing attention to his "emotionally crippling" ending. Tina Amini from Kotaku claimed that she reloaded an earlier save and spent at least another 40 hours making alternate decisions for her Mass Effect 2 playthrough just to ensure that Thane, whom she found compelling as a love interest for her Shepard character, survives the suicide mission and expressed a hope that their romance story arc would be continued for Mass Effect 3. Phil Savage from PC Gamer remarked that Thane's ending in Mass Effect 3 is brilliant, calling it a "quiet, sad triumph"; he's surrounded by family and friends at his deathbed, content with what he's achieved. Savage observed that "this isn't a fate experienced by many major game characters". He likes that BioWare still made an effort to remind players to cherish the things that matter to them as individuals, such as their life goals and loved ones, even if Mass Effect is a game series that resolves around big, galaxy-shifting decisions and impossible odds. Scott Deakin, writing for GamesBeat, found his opportunity to avenge Thane, a character he was emotionally invested in, by finishing off Kai Leng during a cutscene to be deeply satisfying and cathartic. A 2014 IGN reader poll, to determine the "Ultimate RPG Party", had Thane be the eleventh-most voted in character.

The comparison between Kepral's Syndrome and cystic fibrosis provided by Weekes resonated with Elizabeth Rogers from The AbleGamers Foundation, who explained in her article "The Problems and Joys of Thane from Mass Effect" that she suffers from the same condition: a life-threatening genetic disorder that fills her lungs and pancreas with mucus, and that like Thane, her lungs will inevitably no longer work. Rogers appreciated that not only did the writers of Mass Effect present Thane as "one of the few chronically ill characters to play a significant role in any video game" which she could identify herself with, they did not give Thane a cure narrative as part of his story arc, which Rogers found to be respectful. She expressed a view that another writer who identifies as being chronically ill would probably have created a space for Thane to exist without death, "to be disabled and kicking ass well into the end of the series", but is content that he represents a movements towards greater inclusivity and representation of minorities in a video game.

=== Analysis ===
The depiction of Thane's religious piety and spiritual outlook has been subject to analysis. Researcher Greg Perreault examined Mass Effect 2 as part of his research on the depiction of religion as violent or problematic in video games. He observed that Mass Effect 2 does not portray its religious and spiritual themes in a positive light, but he considered Thane to be an interesting case because the violence he commits is not informed by his religion, "although it allows for it." GamesRadar's Jordan Baughman cited Thane as an example of BioWare's "The Honor-bound Psychotic" character archetype, specifically a religious zealot who "adheres to a special code that dictates his murder frenzies". Joshua and Ita Irizarry, co-authors of "The Lord is My Shepard - Confronting Religion in the Mass Effect Trilogy" published as part of the Religion in Digital Games anthology publication, noted Thane's openly religious behaviour and expressed bemusement that the character is embraced as a fan favorite by Mass Effect fandom. They contrasted Thane's positive reception as an unambiguously pious character to the broad negativity many players have shown towards human squadmate Ashley William's expressions of faith in the original Mass Effect. Comparing player responses to Ashley and Thane, the authors surmised that unlike Ashley, "Thane never prompts the player to consider their (or Shepard's) views about religion". The authors posited that in the alternative, Thane and his religion are clearly recognized as alien by players, which do not invite comment on real world religions and spirituality, wheres the same cannot be said of Ashley and her religiosity.

Matt Cronn from Geeks Under Grace, an American pop culture website which publishes news, culture, reviews, and videos from a Christian perspective, examined some of the religious beliefs espoused by Thane within the context of commonly accepted Christian doctrine. He compared Thane's prayers for his own wicked self to the concept of original sin and the practice of Christians praying to God for forgiveness of their own sins. Cronn found the prayer recited on Thane's deathbed to be very interesting as despite the fact that he was dying, Thane's primary concern was to absolve Shepard of the sins of their many kills, and asserted that "this is the kindness and concern for others that Christians should exemplify".

== See also ==
- Religion and video games
