= V'Ball =

1988 video game

- North American arcade flyer
- Developer: Technōs Japan (Note: X68000 version developed by SPS Co., Ltd.)
- Publishers: Technōs Japan: Arcade; JP: Technōs Japan; NA: Taito NES; JP: Technōs Japan; NA/PAL: Nintendo X68000 SPS Co., Ltd.
- Director: Yoshihisa Kishimoto
- Composer: Kazunaka Yamane
- Platforms: Arcade, NES, X68000
- Release: Arcade: JP: August 1988; NA: October 1988; NES: JP: November 10, 1989; NA: February 1990; PAL: January 23, 1992; X68000: JP: November 15, 1989
- Genre: Sports (volleyball)
- Modes: Single-player, multiplayer

V'Ball is a 1988 volleyball video game developed and published by Technōs Japan for arcades. It was released in North America by Taito. A Nintendo Entertainment System version was published by Technōs in Japan and by Nintendo in North America and PAL regions under the title Super Spike V'Ball. A version for the X68000 computer was developed and released by SPS exclusively in Japan.

== Arcade version ==
Arcade version gameplay

The player controls a pair of self-described beach bums named George and Michael, who make their living playing beach volleyball against locals. One day, they find a flyer for a nationwide beach volleyball tournament offering the winning team a $2,500,000 cash prize.

In single-player mode, one person controls both characters on a team. In two-player mode, the players either cooperate by playing on the same team or compete against each other by controlling opposing teams. The American version allows the game to be played by up to four players (if the cabinet allows it). The single-player mode consists of two cycles with four stages: the Minor Circuit and the Major Circuit. The stages in the game are Daytona Beach, New York, Los Angeles and Hawaii. After completing the Major Circuit, the player faces against the U.S. Navy team, set in a naval base.

The controls consist of an eight-directional joystick and two buttons for jumping and receiving. The characters perform several moves including power spiking, back spiking, jump-serving, blocking and diving.

There are a few minor differences between the Japanese and American releases. The Japanese release (U.S. Championship Beach Volley: V'Ball) features an opening cut-scene explaining the plot. Between matches, intermission sequences depict the main characters visiting a car dealership to purchase a vehicle. As the player progresses, the cars increase in quality, shifting from used cars to new cars during the Major Circuit. The American release (U.S. Championship V'Ball) removes these cutscenes, but extends the multiplayer support to up to four players with multiple game modes (1 or 2 players against the computer, 1-on-1, 2-on-1, or 2-on-2).

== NES version ==
NES version gameplay

The NES version features several key differences from the arcade game, such as the ability to select teams. The available pairs in the single player mode are: George and Murphy, the default well-balanced team; Al and John, powerful but slow players with poor defensive skills; Billy and Jimmy (the heroes of the Double Dragon series), defensive players with poor spiking power; and Ed and Michael, fast players with average hitting power. The NES game features a tournament mode against the CPU that can be played alone or with another player, and a competitive mode that allows up to four players.

There are several differences between the Japanese Famicom version (U.S. Championship V'Ball) and the western NES version (Super Spike V'Ball). The Famicom version features a single tournament mode which consists of five American Circuit matches (Daytona Beach, New York City, Chicago, Las Vegas and Los Angeles), three World Cup matches in Hawaii (of random nationalities), and two additional matches against the U.S. Navy and a Soviet Union team in that order. The player can adjust the difficulty setting in the option menu in the Famicom version. Additionally, the characters of George and Ed had their partners switched in the Famicom version, with George being partnered with Michael as in the arcade version, while Ed is partnered with Murphy.

In the NES version, there are three different tournament modes: Exercise, the American Circuit, and the World Cup. The Exercise Mode is a match against the first team in a crowdless court with an easy difficulty. The American Circuit consists of the first five teams featured in the Famicom version's tournament mode with an average difficulty. The World Cup mode consists of seven teams in the following order: Japan, Italy, Australia, Mexico, Brazil, the Navy and USSR, all with a hard difficulty. The background for the Russian stage was also redrawn to make it look less hostile with the omission of the tanks in the Famicom version. There is no difficulty setting in the option menu since the three different tournament modes serve as difficulty settings themselves.

=== Female teams ===
One of the female teams in the NES version

Four additional female teams are present in the game, but are inaccessible to the player under normal playing conditions. The teams can become selectable using a cheating device. Even though they are fully playable in-game, the images representing the female teams in the team selection screen are missing, resulting in garbled graphics being displayed instead.

== Soundtrack ==
An arranged soundtrack was released in Japan by Meldac based on the Famicom version of the game. The soundtrack was composed by Takashi Furukawa, Yoshimitsu Hamano and Funky Yasuda. It was released on March 10, 1990, with the catalog number MECG-28002.

1. V'Ball (Title Back) 4:01
2. First Wave (Daytona Theme) 4:21
3. Twilight Game (New York Theme) 3:37
4. Sea Breeze Hero (Chicago Theme)–Female Vocal Version 4:07
5. $1,000,000 Night (Las Vegas Theme) 4:20
6. SeaSide Walker (L.A. Theme) 4:12
7. Beyond the Sky (Hawaii World Cup Theme) 6:05
8. Iron Wing (Aircraft Carrier Theme) 4:11
9. Big Red Attack (U.S.S.R. Match Theme) 3:45
10. Winner's Theme (Championship Scene) 4:44

== Reception ==
In Japan, Game Machine listed U.S. Championship V'Ball as the sixth most successful table arcade unit of September 1988.

== Releases ==
The NES version was released in North America in February 1990. In addition to this release, the NES version was also included in the Super Spike V'Ball/Nintendo World Cup multicart, which was exclusively a pack-in game with the NES Sports Set distributed in North America in December 1990.

Hamster Corporation released the arcade version as part of their Arcade Archives series for the Nintendo Switch and PlayStation 4, as well as their Arcade Archives 2 series for the Nintendo Switch 2, PlayStation 5 and Xbox Series X/S in August 2026.
