= Catechumen (video game) =

2000 video game

- Developer: N'Lightning Software Development
- Publisher: N'Lightning Software Development
- Producer: Ralph Bagley
- Designers: Kristopher Horton; Chris Perkins
- Programmer: Kristopher Horton
- Artist: Andy Anderson
- Engine: Genesis3D
- Platform: Windows
- Release: October 1, 2000
- Genre: First-person shooter
- Mode: Single-player

Catechumen is a 2000 first-person shooter game with Christian themes developed and published by N'Lightning Software Development. Set during the time of the persecution of Christians in the Roman Empire, the player controls a catechumen, a novice Christian being trained before taking part in secret gatherings. Traversing eighteen levels, they seek to free their mentor and fellow Christians from captivity. The player uses the eight Swords of the Spirit to defeat demons and convert possessed Roman soldiers to Christianity. Faith stands in for the character's health.

Ralph Bagley, N'Lightning's founder and chief executive officer, conceived Catechumen in 1996 because he had mixed feelings about playing Doom and Quake as a licensed minister. He was unable to obtain funding until the Columbine High School massacre in April 1999, which was partially blamed on violent video games. That month, Bagley established N'Lightning, raised US$1 million, and hired staff from the recently defunct Trilobyte to form the core design team. Thirty people worked on the game, which cost $850,000 to make. After eighteen months in development, Catechumen was released in October 2000.

Catechumen received mixed reviews, with praise for its fast-paced action and differing opinions about its story and audiovisual presentation. Its levels, puzzles, and artificial intelligence were widely criticized. The game sold 86,000 copies and was followed by a successor, Ominous Horizons: A Paladin's Calling, in 2001. Both games were among the most expensive and bestselling Christian video games. N'Lightning planned to branch out into console games but did not break even and eventually shut down without further releases.

== Gameplay ==
The player's Swords of the Spirit fire energy beams to defeat demons.

Catechumen is a first-person shooter set in the year 171, during the time of the persecution of Christians in the Roman Empire. The player assumes the role of a catechumen, a novice Christian undergoing training with a mentor for one year before being granted access to secret meetings. Before their training could be completed, their mentor and brethren were captured by the Romans, so the catechumen seeks to free them. The player traverses eighteen levels, facing possessed Roman soldiers and various demons as enemies. As the game progresses, angels grant the catechumen eight Swords of the Spirit to use as weapons. Each sword has a different strength and effectiveness against certain enemies. They shoot energy beams that defeat demons and convert Roman soldiers to Christianity, who then kneel down and start to pray.

The catechumen's faith decreases when enemies inflict damage, analogous to health. It can be increased by collecting scrolls of scripture, while the Armor of God pickup provides additional protection. The game ends when the player loses all faith. Some levels require the player to solve puzzles to proceed, such as finding keys, pushing buttons or levers, turning valves, and rearranging boxes. Satan is the final boss. There are five difficulty settings—"Fledgling", "Easy", "Normal", "Hard", and "Impossible"—and beating the game on the highest setting unlocks the secret "Hall of Fame" area.

== Development and release ==
Catechumen was the debut game of N'Lightning Software Development, a studio focused on Christian video games and based in Medford, Oregon. The company's founder and chief executive officer, Ralph D. Bagley, was a licensed minister at the Church of God in Christ in Medford. Additionally, he was the publisher of The Christian Quarterly, a small newspaper in the Western United States. Bagley had been a fan of video games since Pong and Pac-Man but had mixed feelings about coming home from church to play "nastier" games like Doom and Quake. Seeing the recently increased popularity of Christian music, he believed there was a potential market for Christian games "that match the excitement of secular games while promoting Christian values – without the violent or sexually explicit content".

In 1996, Bagley pitched his idea for what would become Catechumen to six investors, both Christian and secular, but was turned down by all of them. However, after the Columbine High School massacre occurred in April 1999, its perpetrators were found to have been obsessed with violent games like Doom and Quake, which caused those games to be partially blamed for the shooting. In the wake of these events, two investors returned Bagley's calls. He raised nearly US$1 million from private investors, including an attendee of his church. He noted that a large budget was necessary because underfunded Christian games tended to turn out "cheesy". At the same time, Trilobyte, a local game studio that had developed The 7th Guest and The 11th Hour, had recently closed and laid off its staff. Bagley consequently established N'Lightning in April 1999 and hired several of them to form the core design team. The development of Catechumen began immediately and took eighteen months.

Bagley sought a game that he would want to play, having previously enjoyed the Christian games The War in Heaven and Saints of Virtue. He ruled out a nonviolent video game, focusing instead on spiritual warfare. Initially aimed solely at other Christians, the game was later designed for a wider audience by not being "preachy" about its biblical themes and texts. Around thirty people worked on the game, with Andy Anderson as lead artist, Chris Perkins as lead level designer, and Kristopher Horton as lead programmer and lead game designer. On several occasions, the core team of eleven developers worked sixteen hours per day. The team used the Genesis3D engine, which cost $10,000 to license as closed-source software. The development cost $850,000 in total.

Catechumen was announced on July 18, 2000. The name had been chosen from a number of possible titles because it made people question its meaning. It was marketed through advertisements in game magazines like PC Gamer and Computer Gaming World, inclusions on cover disks, and a three-level demo available on the game's website. The game was released for Windows on October 1, 2000. A Mac OS version was discussed. Catechumen was initially sold only via N'Lightning's website and through Christian bookstores. FindEx, a software distributor with a focus on Christian media, was tasked with shipping it to store chains like CompUSA, Wal-Mart, and Babbage's. CenturionSoft brought the game to 450 Babbage's locations and the Amazon.com online store in March 2001.

== Reception ==
Reception

Aggregate score
Aggregator	Score
GameRankings	53%

Review scores
Publication	Score
CNET Gamecenter	4/10
GameRevolution	D−
GameZone	8.5/10
Just Adventure	B
USA Today	3/4

Catechumen received mixed reviews; the review aggregator website GameRankings calculated a weighted average rating of 53% based on ten critic reviews. Michael Lafferty of GameZone called the storyline "refreshing" for drawing from existing legends instead of inventing something entirely new. Conversely, GameRevolution's Johnny Liu found the story to be "more boring than Sunday school". CNET Gamecenter's Colin Williamson lauded the game's pacing, saying it was "ridiculously fast, making even Doom seem lethargic in comparison".

A.S. Berman, in his review for USA Today, reported the game as a satisfying adrenaline rush, and he praised the environments as being "exquisitely rendered". Randy Sluganski of Just Adventure said the graphics were less advanced than peers like Quake and Unreal but praised the use of vibrant colors, dynamic lighting, and volumetric fog. Games Domain's Bruce Pulver criticized the visuals only for often being too dark, such that important elements were not visible. Williamson regarded the lighting as poor overall, oscillating between being too dark and exhibiting "over-saturated disco colors". Liu cited blurry textures, some lackluster animations, and poorly executed illusions for outdoor areas. Ryan Reynolds wrote for the Evansville Courier & Press that the game exhibited some visible shortcomings, such as enemy limbs clipping through walls.

Sluganski described the music as "easy on the ears", being slightly better than that in other shooters. In contrast, Pulver felt that the audio was the game's weakest element, with some music tracks seeming out of place, demons sounding "more annoying than frightening", and angel dialog being difficult to hear due to ambient sounds. Liu faulted simplistic level designs, which Williamson labeled "cramped and claustrophobic". Williamson regarded the gameplay as irritating and the environments as "snore-worthy", also lambasting the artificial intelligence. Liu deplored the limited interactivity, while Sluganski regarded the unoriginal puzzles as the game's "major downside". Reynolds felt that the game was too easy, as the abundance of scrolls meant he rarely faced death. Williamson mourned the lack of a multiplayer mode, and Pulver bemoaned the inability to use stealth to avoid enemies.

Catechumen sold 20,000 copies within weeks of its wider retail release and 86,000 units by August 2006. Major markets were Australia, Denmark, Germany, the Netherlands, Sweden, the United Kingdom, and the United States. Bagley said he received encouraging emails from parents 25–30 times per day.

== Legacy ==
As Catechumen featured no multiplayer, N'Lightning had begun developing a multiplayer game by August 2000. The company later created another single-player first-person shooter, Ominous Horizons: A Paladin's Calling. It was in development by March 2001 and released in September with CenturionSoft as the distributor. The game cost $1.6 million to produce, making it the most expensive Christian game. By July 2005, it had sold 50,000 copies. Catechumen and Ominous Horizons were among the bestselling Christian games of all time, and N'Lightning's sales increased yearly. Despite this, the company remained an obscure name in the video game industry and did not break even. N'Lightning later sought to develop a console game, having licensed a game engine for $500,000. Bagley estimated the development would cost between $2.5 million and $4 million, plus 150% thereof for marketing. In January 2005, he founded the Christian Game Developers Foundation to bring Christian games into the mainstream and raise funds for a prospective Christian console game. N'Lightning ultimately closed without releasing any further games.
