= Captain Bible in Dome of Darkness =

1994 video game

- Publisher: Bridgestone Multimedia Group
- Designer: M. Peter Engelbrite
- Composer: L. Eve Engelbrite
- Platform: MS-DOS
- Release: 1994
- Genres: Edutainment, action-adventure

Captain Bible in Dome of Darkness is a Christian video game title released by Bridgestone Multimedia Group in 1994. The main focus of the game is scripture memorization but action video game elements can also play a significant role depending on options selected during setup.

== Plot ==
The game centers on a city of humans which was one day encased by a Dome of Darkness, perpetrated by robot cybers who have trapped the citizens in lies (which range from various Christian topics such as God, creation, morality, forgiveness, so on and so forth). While the organization known as Bible Corps. has managed to make a hole in the dome big enough for Captain Bible to go through, they have not been able to accomplish much more.

Captain Bible is sent by Bible Corps. to be beamed into the city. Though he is able to take his computer Bible with him, all of the verses are erased once he entered the Dome of Darkness. To remedy this, Bible Corps. beams Scripture stations into the city where he may reload it. In-between each level, a flying small drone type cyborg comes and deletes the Bible scriptures from your Computer Bible while you move onto the next level/world forcing you to find new verses for new lies in the next world/level. Gameplay centers on Captain Bible obtaining these verses and using them to confront the cybers who obstruct the hallways of the buildings in the city. An optional feature allows the player to engage the cybers in hand-to-hand combat giving the options to defend attack and retreat, which is performed using the Sword of the Spirit and the Shield of Faith.

The game is presumably set in the somewhat distant future based upon several of the game details, including the cybers themselves, the transporter-type device used to beam Captain Bible into the Dome, and the spacecraft he uses in the opening screen to fly to the command post.

== Reception ==
Richard Corbett for PC Gamer opined that Captain Bible might be the worst superhero ever to get his own video game.

== See also ==
- Christian video game
