= List of Christian animations =

These are animated series and films that are based on Christian beliefs.

Title	Release date
The Candlemaker	December 25, 1956
Davey and Goliath	February 25, 1961 – February 24, 1973
JOT	1965–1974
The Little Drummer Boy	December 19, 1968
The Night The Animals Talked	December 9, 1970
The First Christmas: The Story of the First Christmas Snow	December 19, 1975
The Little Drummer Boy Book II	1976
Nestor, The Long-Eared Christmas Donkey	December 3, 1977
The Small One	December 16, 1978
Superbook	October 1, 1981 – March 25, 1982
The Flying House	April 5, 1982 – March 28, 1983
Superbook II: In Search for Ruffles and Return to the 20th Century	April 4, 1983 – September 26, 1983
The Greatest Adventure: Stories from the Bible	April 26, 1985 – August 19, 1992
The Kingdom Chums: Little David's Adventure	November 28, 1986
The Little Troll Prince	November 27, 1987
Animated Stories from the New Testament	1987–2004
McGee and Me!	June 4, 1989 – June 11, 1995
Adventures in Odyssey	1991–present
Animated Hero Classics	1991–2004
Animated Stories from the Bible	1992–1995
VeggieTales	December 23, 1993 – March 3, 2015
Secret Adventures	1993–1995
Testament: The Bible in Animation	October 11 – December 6, 1996
Gaither's Pond	1997 – 2003
In the Beginning: The Bible Stories	April 1, 1997 – May 9, 1997
Dorbees: Making Decisions	September 8, 1998
Mighty Messengers: Jonah and the Whale	August 12, 1999
Angelmouse	September 27, 1999 – March 31, 2000
Little Dogs on the Prairie	2000
Noah's Park	2000 – 2001
Cherub Wings	March 3, 2000 – April 12, 2011
3-2-1 Penguins!	November 14, 2000 – November 13, 2008
Joseph: King of Dreams	November 7, 2000
You Are Special	October 22, 2001
Paws & Tales	2001 – present
Ewe Know	February 22, 2002 – July 23, 2008
Larryboy: The Cartoon Adventures	March 16, 2002 – June 10, 2003
Hermie and Friends	December 10, 2002 – May 1, 2010
Jonah: A VeggieTales Movie	October 4, 2002
The Star of Christmas	October 2002
Ribbits!	2002 – 2003
Ben Hur	February 15, 2003
A Wobots Christmas	December 17, 2003
The 3 Wise Men	December 19, 2003
The Legend of the Sky Kingdom	October 2003
K10C: Kids' Ten Commandments	2003
Bugtime Adventures	2003–present
Joshua and the Promised Land	April 25, 2004
Hoop Dogz	October 15, 2004 – 2007
Angel Wars	October 28, 2004 – 2006
Baby Faith	2004 – 2006
The Roach Approach/Bug Rangers	November 16, 2004 - 2007
Davey and Goliath's Snowboard Christmas	December 19, 2004
The Pilgrim's Progress	December 31, 2004
On the Farm with Farmer Bob	2004 – 2006
Auto-B-Good	January 17, 2005 – February 27, 2006
BOZ the Bear	2005 – 2008
Noah's Ark Story of the biblical flood	February 1, 2005
Prince Vladimir	February 23, 2006
A Christmas Journey: About the blessings God gives	October 10, 2006
The Very First Noel	2006
Friends and Heroes	March 12, 2007 – July 3, 2009
Noah's Ark	July 5, 2007
The Ten Commandments	October 19, 2007
Booples	October 23, 2008 – November 20, 2008
Donkie Ollie	January 1, 2010
The Lion of Judah	June 3, 2011
Superbook	September 1, 2011 – May 4, 2021
Young Abraham	June 3, 2011
Strawinsky and the Mysterious House	2012
Iesodo	2013–16
VeggieTales in the House	November 26, 2014 – September 23, 2016
Joseph: Beloved Son, Rejected Slave, Exalted Ruler	2015
Bibleman: The Animated Adventures	2016 – 2020
VeggieTales in the City	February 24, 2017 – September 15, 2017
The Star	November 17, 2017
Bible Town	2017
God with Us	2017
Owlegories	2018–present
The Pilgrim's Progress	April 18, 2019
The Garden	2019
The VeggieTales Show	October 15, 2019 – April 1, 2022
Sea Kids	2019–present
Lukas Storyteller	2019–present
Superbook: Gizmo Go!	2020–present
Mystery of the Kingdom of God	2021
Young David	November 10, 2023 – March 8, 2024
The Dead Sea Squirrels	2025
The King of Kings	April 11, 2025
Light of the World	September 5, 2025
The Chosen Adventures	2025
David	December 19, 2025

== See also ==
- List of Christian films
- List of Christian video games
