= Super Spike V'Ball/Nintendo World Cup =

Super Spike V'Ball/Nintendo World Cup is a Nintendo Entertainment System multicart which combines two games:

- Super Spike V'Ball
- Nintendo World Cup

It was sold exclusively as a pack-in game with the NES Sports Set distributed in North America in December 1990.
