= Noah's Ark (video game) =

1992 video game

- Developers: Source Research & Development
- Publisher: Konami of Europe
- Designers: Jason Benham; Ross Harris; John Cassells
- Programmers: Jason Benham; Link Tomlin (audio)
- Artists: Ross Harris; John Cassells
- Composer: Chris Gill
- Platforms: NES, Steam
- Release: NES: EU: 1992; Steam: WW: March 30, 2021
- Genre: Platform
- Mode: Single-player

Reception

Review scores
Publication	Score
GameZone	79/100
Total!	86%
Video Games (DE)	62%
N-Force	77/100

Noah's Ark is a platform game for the Nintendo Entertainment System produced by British studio Source R&D and published in 1992 by Konami. It was only released in Europe. Unlike most other games based on biblical content released around the same time, this one was officially approved by Nintendo. It is based on the biblical story with the same name. The game was re-released on Steam in 2021.

== Gameplay ==
The player controls Noah to rescue different animals across the world. Noah is aided by powerups. Ducks give the player different weapons; some items turn Noah invulnerable, or freeze enemies. During each stage, water slowly rises, making Noah harder to maneuver.

The game takes place on all seven worlds based on continents and time periods (Europe based on ancient Rome, North America based on the Wild West, South America based on Inca Empire, Africa based on ancient Egypt, Antarctica based on Ice age, Oceania based on Prehistoric Australia, and Asia based on China or Heian period) with three stages per world, thus having 21 stages total. At the end of the two thirds of the stages Noah has to fight a drainplug monster. Every third stage ends with a large boss fight.

== See also ==
- Bible Adventures, unlicensed NES game featuring Noah.
- Super 3D Noah's Ark, unlicensed Super NES game.
