= Wisdom Tree =

Video game company

Wisdom Tree, Inc.
- Type: Private
- Industry: Video games
- Founded: 1990; 36 years ago
- Founder: Dan Lawton
- Headquarters: U.S.
- Key people: Brenda Huff
- Parent: Color Dreams (1990–1997)

Wisdom Tree, Inc. is an American developer of Christian video games. It was an offshoot of Color Dreams, one of the first companies to work around Nintendo's 10NES lockout chip technology for the Nintendo Entertainment System. Color Dreams formed the Wisdom Tree subsidiary in 1990 in an effort to circumvent Nintendo's restrictions against publishers of unlicensed video games for the NES by selling their games at Christian book stores which was not subject to pressure by Nintendo.

== History ==
Color Dreams was based in Brea, California, and was started by Daniel Lawton, a self-educated computer programmer and vocal opponent of Nintendo's licensing policy. Founded in 1988, Color Dreams was one of the largest producers of unlicensed games for the NES, but, due to pressure from Nintendo, it faced many difficulties getting retailers to stock its games. Although Color Dreams violated no laws in opting out of the Nintendo licensing system with its workaround of Nintendo's 10NES lockout chip, Nintendo was displeased that it was receiving no revenue from Color Dreams games, and wanted to prevent other companies from following suit. Nintendo threatened to cease selling games to retailers that sold unlicensed NES games.

Because retailers could not afford to stop doing business with Nintendo, unlicensed companies were at a disadvantage. Color Dreams had great difficulty accessing the retail market, and worked outside of mainstream NES distribution channels. Also, many of its games were reported to have problems getting to run properly, occasionally even requiring instructions on the cartridge, and were criticized for their lack of quality and gameplay. The problems with running Color Dreams games stemmed from physical changes in later models of the NES; long-time Color Dreams employee Vance Kozik (best known as the programmer of Menace Beach) recalled having customers who called Color Dreams and read off the serial number of their NES unit so that they could send them a compatible cartridge. The quality issues with the games were in part due to the reverse engineering required to develop unlicensed NES games, which effectively forced the company's programmers to work within stricter technical limitations than licensed NES developers had, such as fewer sprites displayed on-screen.

In 1990, Color Dreams began to consider producing games with biblical themes. At the time, there were few religious video games for console systems. Officials at Color Dreams saw a market for them and that many stores that would be most interested in retailing Christian games. Christian bookstores were likely not to sell video games at all, and thus not vulnerable to pressure from Nintendo. Christian bookstores sold much more than books, like religious movies, Contemporary Christian music, and other goods, but not video games. To convince these stores to sell religious games, Color Dreams formed Wisdom Tree and promoted this new genre of video games. Wisdom Tree sent Christian bookstores 3-foot Bible Adventures displays, and VHS cassettes showing gameplay. These promotional videos made the case to Christian bookstores using lines like: "This game promotes Bible literacy and teaches children about the Bible while they play a 'fun and exciting' Super Mario Bros. style video game." Ultimately, these efforts proved successful, and Color Dreams gained a new distribution channel for its games, and launched a new genre of video games, without direct competition. Kozik later commented, "No one knew it was going to take off, but it took off like crazy."

Nintendo never threatened any legal action against Wisdom Tree, and probably feared a public relations backlash from parents and religious groups.

Color Dreams also published games with the Bunch Games label. In 1996, its StarDot Technologies division started selling digital security cameras.

== Games ==
Wisdom Tree's games have a Christian theme, and were often sold in Christian bookstores. Most games adapt Bible stories to appeal to children of the video game era. Many of its games are partial conversion themed re-releases of Color Dreams games. A Wisdom Tree product catalog shows Joshua & the Battle of Jericho as a side-scrolling game using the Bible Adventures engine. The actual released game has the engine of Crystal Mines and Exodus.

The company's first release as Wisdom Tree is Bible Adventures, a three-in-one multicart with many gameplay elements from the American Super Mario Bros. 2, applied to three different Bible stories: Noah collecting animals for the Ark, saving Baby Moses from the Pharaoh's men, and re-enacting the story of David and Goliath. The company sold 350,000 copies, encouraging this path.

Other Wisdom Tree games include Exodus (a conversion of Color Dreams's Crystal Mines game, with the story of the Israelites' 40-year desert trek), King of Kings (similar to Bible Adventures, but featuring three events in the early life of Jesus Christ) and Bible Buffet (a "video board game" with Bible quizzes). Spiritual Warfare is an action-adventure game similar in style to The Legend of Zelda, with the requisite religious theme where the player, as a foot soldier in the Lord's army, is tasked with saving the souls of the heathen populace, using fruit of the spirit. The company released ports of some of these games to the Sega Genesis and Game Boy, and Bible-reading programs (both King James and NIV versions) for Game Boy. Sunday Funday is a 1995 conversion of the Color Dreams game Menace Beach, and is the last commercial NES release in the United States.

Wisdom Tree made the only unlicensed commercially released game for the North American Super NES, Super 3D Noah's Ark. This conversion of the Wolfenstein 3D engine features the player as Noah, quelling upset animals on the Ark by flinging sleep-inducing fruit at them. As the only North American Super NES cartridge to not use the standard Nintendo-manufactured shell, its shape resembles the Super NES Game Genie or Sonic & Knuckles on the Genesis, with a pass-through cartridge port at the top; the game requires a Nintendo-licensed cartridge plugged into this pass-through, bypassing the Super NES's lockout protection. A PC port was released on Steam in 2015, with retouched features such as support for widescreen resolutions and achievements.

King of Kings was listed as the honorable mention in Gamespy.com's "Seven Christmas Games That Make You Hate Christmas", due to its unentertaining gameplay and the farcical feel of dodging "acid-spitting camels".

Color Dreams pamphlets tout a lineup of Genesis games, all of them ports of Amiga games, but were all canceled. Other unfinished Color Dreams games include a PC game called Hellraiser. Another Wolfenstein 3D engine game, it was canceled upon the release of Doom because Color Dreams decided it could not compete. Maggots for NES has the player character trapped inside a human corpse and must escape while avoiding the maggots which infest it.

Wisdom Tree games
Title	Year	Platforms	Developer	Publisher
Bible Adventures	1991	NES, Genesis	Wisdom Tree	Wisdom Tree
Exodus	1991	NES, Game Boy, Genesis, MS-DOS	Wisdom Tree	Wisdom Tree
King of Kings: The Early Years	1991	NES	Wisdom Tree	Wisdom Tree
Joshua & the Battle of Jericho	1992	NES, Game Boy, Genesis, MS-DOS	Wisdom Tree	Wisdom Tree
Spiritual Warfare	1992	NES, Game Boy, Genesis, MS-DOS	Wisdom Tree	Wisdom Tree
Bible Buffet	1993	NES	Wisdom Tree	Wisdom Tree
King James Bible	1993	Game Boy	Wisdom Tree	Wisdom Tree
Super 3D Noah's Ark	1994	Super NES, MS-DOS	Wisdom Tree	Wisdom Tree
Sunday Funday	1995	NES	Wisdom Tree	Wisdom Tree
NIV Bible & the 20 Lost Levels of Joshua	1996	Game Boy	Wisdom Tree	Wisdom Tree
Heaven Bound	2003	PC	Wisdom Tree	Emerald Studios
Jesus in Space	2007	PC	Sunday Software	Wisdom Tree

== Ongoing activities ==
Wisdom Tree mainly licenses its games. The company released an all-in-one "TV controller" system featuring seven of its NES games in a single, self-contained unit. Its website also has games by other developers. Heaven Bound is one example of a more modern 3D game for the PC. These games are produced on 3D Game Studio (such as Joseph and Galilee Flyer by Sunday Software), using the default models that come with the program.

In 2010, all Wisdom Tree NES games were on the official Wisdom Tree website via a Java-based NES emulator.

In 2013, retro game publisher Piko Interactive licensed cartridge reprints of Wisdom Tree games, starting with Super 3D Noah's Ark.

In 2014, retro gaming website Stone Age Gamer began selling licensed T-shirts based on numerous Wisdom Tree properties including: Bible Buffet, Sunday Funday, Super 3D Noah's Ark, and Exodus.

In 2015, a PC remake of Super 3D Noah's Ark was released on Steam through the Steam Greenlight service.
