= H.U.R.L. =

1995 video game

- Developer: Millennium Media Group
- Publisher: Deep River Publishing
- Engine: 3D GameStudio
- Platform: MS-DOS
- Release: 1995
- Genre: First-person shooter
- Mode: Single-player

H.U.R.L. is a non-violent first person shooter aimed at children. It was released in 1995 by Deep River Publishing for IBM PC compatibles. It was re-released as Slob Zone 3D, and then translated to German and released as Blob Schlammschlacht 3D ("Blob Mudfight 3D").

== Gameplay ==
An enemy being hit with an exploding bar of soap.

The game takes place in an area called The Slob Zone, which is under the control of Bob the Slob, who controls the Hardcore Union of Radical Litterbugs, the legion of oversized creatures such as frogs and cats that gives the game its name. The game provides a storyline stating that Bob the Slob has stolen the world's supply of clean underwear and it is up to the player to get it back. The player navigates through various neighborhoods from which the human population seems to have been chased out, and which are now occupied by the aforementioned sloppy animals, most of whom are armed with trash and ready to dump it on any player attempting to break in and clean up. The hero's role involves not only staying clean while navigating through the game's ten increasingly messy levels, but also cleaning up after the animals, who have dirtied the landscape with waste items such as banana peels, empty soda bottles, and apple cores. As the players gathers up rubbish, they will find vending machines where it can be dropped off and traded for weapons: soap, water balloons, and deodorant, which they can use to fight back against the animals as they hurl their trash. If an animal is hit too many times, it will stop attacking and most will allow the player to pass. If the player is hit too many times, the screen displays the message "YOU'VE BEEN SLOBBED!" and the level starts over again with all the trash and animals respawned, and no weapons or trash in the hands of the player. However, the game can be saved at any point, and restoring a saved game will also restore the weapons and money the player had when it was saved.

Lacking violence, the game uses graphical surrealism and potty humor to keep its young audience interested. The player must search each level for bathrooms, which can contain a clean toilet where the player may be "healed" of grime such as kitty litter. In the final level the player sneaks into a nightclub and then into a house with no bathroom, and meets the game's only boss, whose weapon of choice is his own dirty diapers and who emits a brief fart-like sound when hit. As the game earned an RSAC rating suitable for children, no graphic depictions of anything obscene are included.

== Reception ==
CNET said "While the game play is simple enough for a seven-year-old to enjoy, it's varied enough to keep an older child's interest".
