= Ominous Horizons: A Paladin's Calling =

2001 video game

- Developer: N'Lightning Software Development
- Publisher: N'Lightning Software Development
- Producer: Ralph Bagley
- Designer: Chris Perkins
- Engine: Genesis3D
- Platform: Windows
- Release: September 1, 2001
- Genre: First-person shooter
- Mode: Single-player

Ominous Horizons: A Paladin's Calling is a 2001 first-person shooter game with Christian themes developed and published by N'Lightning Software Development. It casts the player as the Johannes Gutenberg's assistant, who must travel the world to retrieve the Gutenberg Bible master copy, which had been stolen by one of Satan's minions. The player uses three weapons with interchangeable ammunition and can collect Bible verses to restore their health. Ominous Horizons is the successor to 2000's Catechumen. With a budget of $1.6 million, Ominous Horizons was the most expensive Christian video game. It was released in September 2001 to negative reviews, with criticism directed at its game engine, gameplay, level design, animations, dialog, and voice acting. Only the enemy designs and music were received positively. The game sold 50,000 copies and was N'Lightning's last release.

== Gameplay ==
The player's Sword of the Spirit fires energy beams to defeat enemies.

Ominous Horizons is a first-person shooter (FPS) that casts the player as the assistant to Johannes Gutenberg, the inventor of the printing press. One of Satan's minions has destroyed the press and stolen the master copy of the Gutenberg Bible, which shattered his faith. As the assistant, the player traverses various locales to fight enemies and retrieve the Bible's pages. Settings including Mesa Verde, Egypt, the Scottish Highlands, Japan, a Maya temple, a haunted mansion near Stonehenge, and the Underworld. Some levels include jumping puzzles. The player's arsenal consists of the Sword of the Spirit, a crossbow, and the Staff of Moses. Each weapon has multiple modes of fire enabled by collecting ammunition for them. When injured, the player can collect Bible verses to restore their health.

== Development and release ==
Ominous Horizons was the second game (after Catechumen) by N'Lightning Software Development, a studio focused on Christian video games and based in Medford, Oregon. It was in development by March 2001 and then scheduled for mid-2001. Later, it was due "in time for Christmas". The development team, under lead game designer Chris Perkins, modified the Genesis3D engine to improve upon Catechumen's artificial intelligence, gameplay, level design, and graphics. Ominous Horizons cost $1.6 million to produce, making it the most expensive Christian game. It went gold on August 10, 2001, and was released on September 1 with CenturionSoft as the distributor. A demo, released in October via N'Lightning's website and select mirror sites, attained more than 200 downloads on average per hour.

== Reception ==
Reception

Review scores
Publication	Score
Computer Gaming World	1.5/5
GameSpy	37/100

Ominous Horizons received negative reviews. It was principally criticized for its game engine, which frequently encountered loading screens. Mark Asher of Computer Gaming World regarded it as "a third-rate 3D engine". While GameSpy's Kevin Rice applauded the custom additions to Genesis3D, he still considered a poor one, and blamed it—as well as repetitive low-resolution textures, sluggish animations and dialogs, and maze-like level design—for making the game appear like "a slipshod, hastily thrown together project at best". Despite lauding the enemy variety, Asher exclaimed: "As for the gameplay, you get the garden-variety dodge and circle-strafing you've done dozens of times before in other, better shooters. You can download better fan mods."

Rice enjoyed the creativity of some opponent designs but faulted them for their lackluster artificial intelligence, with some being "downright annoying". He further criticized the repetitive level design, tedious jumping puzzles, "dry" dialog with amateurish voice acting, and "unsettling" swimming animation. He found the camera bobbing effect particularly nauseating and slated the lack of an option to disable it. Rice cited the "halfway decent" music as one of the few upsides. Asher believed that the game was aimed at a player base that was unlikely to play FPS games while being uninteresting for regular FPS players. Rice said it was a poor attempt at combining the message of good and evil with video games.

By July 2005, the game had sold 50,000 copies. Although Ominous Horizons, like Catechumen, was among the bestselling Christian video games, it was N'Lightning's last release.
