= Bible Builder =

1992 video game

- Developer: Everbright Software
- Publisher: Everbright Software
- Platform: MS-DOS
- Release: 1992
- Genre: Educational/Christian

Bible Builder is a Christian video game for MS-DOS produced by Everbright Software in 1992.

== Gameplay ==
Gameplay consists of answering questions on the Old and New Testaments, popular hymns, and the geography of biblical events. Correct answers are rewarded with a fragment of a Bible verse while incorrect answers cause a candle to burn down. The game is won if the verse can be identified before the candle completely burns out. The game consists of six levels from beginner to genius. Players progress to the next level after winning seven games.

== See also ==
- Christian video games
