= Joshua & the Battle of Jericho =

1992 video game

- Cover of the NES version
- Developer(s): Wisdom Tree
- Publisher(s): Wisdom Tree
- Programmer(s): Vance Kozik; Jim Treadway
- Platform(s): MS-DOS, Game Boy, NES, Genesis
- Release: NES: NA: 1992; Game Boy: NA: 1993; DOS, Genesis: NA: 1994
- Genre(s): Puzzle, Christian
- Mode(s): Single-player, multiplayer (Note: Up to 2 players with alternating turns.)

Joshua & the Battle of Jericho is a 1992 Christian video game developed and published by Wisdom Tree. The game is themed on the Battle of Jericho described in the Book of Joshua, in which the Israelites topple the defensive wall of the city of Jericho by encircling it and blowing their trumpets.

As a tile-based action puzzle game, Joshua & the Battle of Jericho was one of the few Christian video games of its day that did not adhere strictly to a Bible quiz format. However, the player is asked five multiple choice questions about the Book of Joshua between levels.

In 1992, Wisdom Tree published the game in the United States for the Nintendo Entertainment System, and later ported it to Game Boy (1993), MS-DOS (1994), and Sega Genesis (1994).

== Design and gameplay ==
The game is a sequel to 1991's Exodus, which was a redesign of Crystal Mines (1989), a title developed by Ken Beckett for Wisdom Tree's predecessor, Color Dreams. In addition to changes in theme, graphics, and game mechanics, Joshua introduces a password feature for revisiting a game level. The game has 100 levels, 100 quizzes, and 10 bonus stages. Unlike Exodus, the game has no background music.

Whereas in Crystal Mines the player character is a gun-wielding robot who mines a newly discovered exoplanet, Joshua is a tribal leader of Israel who infiltrates and pillages the city of Jericho. He attacks enemies and destroys obstacles with blasts from a shofar (a Jewish ceremonial horn). Enemies include Amorites, Hittites, and other Canaanites; Balaam (Note: In the books of Joshua and Numbers, Balaam is a prophet who is slain when Reubenites invade Moab.) features as a slightly more powerful enemy. Joshua's trumpet blasts (called "toots" in-game) also destroy blocks of Jericho's wall; "Israelite discontent", "Achan's sin", and "foreign idols" (cult images) are likewise represented by destructible tiles. The trumpet blasts are symbolized by white quavers. Occasionally, destroying a block with a trumpet blast reveals an item or power-up.

All the levels have a time limit. To advance in the game, Joshua must pillage enough gold, silver, brass, and iron to meet the quota for the level. He must also collect five "Joshua questions". With all these attained, he navigates to the exit. The obstacles to these goals are movable boulders, immovable barriers, destructible objects, enemy soldiers, citizens, goats, et al.

After each game level (including the final one) is a Bible quiz. By correctly answering trivia questions about the Book of Joshua (and other books such as Numbers and Deuteronomy), the player earns Bibles. The game advances even if the player answers questions incorrectly.

== Reception ==
Reception

Review scores
Publication	Score
Hardcore Gaming 101	4/10
Sega-16	8/10
