= Religion and video games =

Subfield of digital religion

The study of religion and video games is a subfield of digital religion, which the American scholar of communication, Heidi Campbell, defines as "Religion that is constituted in new ways through digital media and cultures." Video games once struggled for legitimacy as a cultural product; today, however, they are both business and art. Video games increasingly turn to religion not just as ornament but as core elements of their video game design and play. Games involve moral decision, rely on invented religions, and allow users to create and experience virtual religious spaces. As one of the newest forms of entertainment, however, there is often controversy and moral panic when video games engage religion, for instance, in Insomniac Games' use of the Manchester Cathedral in Resistance: Fall of Man. Concepts and elements of contemporary and ancient religions appear in video games in various ways: places of worship are a part of the gameplay of real-time strategy games like Age of Empires; narratively, games sometimes borrow themes from religious traditions like in Mass Effect 2.

== Defining religion and religious elements ==
Religion has several definitions. Religious groups that are organized can be seen as cultural systems, with corresponding behavior and practice. They often have sacred texts and holy places. A religious experience, however, does not necessarily have to be understood through an established religious framework.

Themes and questions about life and death, innocence and guilt and violence are existential in nature; while they are not immediately understood as "religious", they are about the meaning of life.

== Use of religious elements ==
Video game developers use religious and spiritual themes to involve the player more deeply in the game. Video game developer Shigeru Miyamoto, who used to play outside as a child, used his experiences and memories of exploring the forest and discovering a Buddhist temple in the design of his video games. Canadian developer BioWare (Mass Effect, Dragon Age) has in its offices several encyclopedias on religion, as well as the Book of the Dead.

The negative portrayal of religions has been criticized.

Religious elements are used in two ways: explicit and implicit. They are seen side by side in video games and do not exclude each other. Religion in Mass Effect, for instance, can be understood as an "unseen character".

=== Explicit narrative references ===
An explicit reference to a religious or spiritual concept is one that is clear to what it is referring. These can be based upon real-world religions, but also on fictional ones. Stories, motifs and names of characters from religious texts are used as reference points.

==== Ancient religions ====
Ancient religions and their deities are used in various ways. The religions portrayed are often no longer practiced, like ancient Greek religion. In the real-time strategy game Age of Mythology the player has to choose a "major god", which gives certain gameplay benefits. In Prince of Persia, the nameless Prince has to fight Ahriman, an evil deity from Zoroastrianism.

==== Events and places ====
Real world historical religions and events are used as inspiration for video games. For instance, while Assassin's Creed is fictional, it is set during the Third Crusade in the Holy Land; the player takes on the role of the Assassin Altaïr Ibn-La'Ahad and is involved in the conflict between Catholic Christians, Orthodox Christians, Sunni Muslims and Shi'ite Muslims. While these religions appear, they are portrayed in a "sanitized manner".

==== Organizations ====
Religion is often institutionalized, having a certain organisational structure. Most games in the Megami Tensei series involve a religion, or a cult. In The Elder Scrolls III: Morrowind, the Tribunal Temple rules over Morrowind and persecute those who blaspheme against their doctrines. The player is able to join the Temple and can rise through the ranks, eventually becoming Patriarch of the Temple.

==== Religious violence ====
In the action role-playing game The Elder Scrolls V: Skyrim a civil war is about to erupt between the Empire and the Stormcloaks. The Stormcloaks wish to worship Talos, a human ascended to godhood. The Empire previously fought a war with the Aldmeri Dominion, an alliance led by a group of elven supremacists called the Thalmor. As a condition of their peace treaty, the worship of Talos was criminalized. It is up to the player to help in the conflict.

=== Implicit narrative references ===
The Triforce from The Legend of Zelda series. Based upon the concept of mon, it is a recognizable symbol for the series.

The stories of action-adventure and role-playing games often involve world-saving quests. The player, as the protagonist, takes on the role of the hero. The player character is often destined to save the world, which in itself is a prophecy.

The Legend of Zelda uses religious elements and motifs like the Triforce.

== Virtual rituals and telepresence ==
Players and developers use games to express their existential and spiritual feelings. Video games as cultural objects can provide religious and spiritual experiences, like Journey. Developer Jenova Chen said that "I feel that Journey is a very spiritual game. People from around the world ask me if the game has a religious connection. Many religions share an affinity with Journey—this is because many religions partly share a common structure". Chen said Journey is based upon Joseph Campbell's book on comparative mythology The Hero with a Thousand Faces and the "Hero's Journey" narrative structure.Scholar Rachel Wagner believes that games can serve as "virtual rituals," where players perform repetitive actions that carry profound symbolic meanings, similar to traditional religious rituals . This interactivity creates a "remote immersion," which makes players feel whether they are actually in a sacred digital environment, even if this environment is entirely fictional.

After the death of Leonard Nimoy, Star Trek Online added two statues in his honor, and World of Warcraft added a non-player character (NPC) based upon Robin Williams after his death. Developer Gearbox Software honored a deceased fan of Borderlands, cancer victim Michael John Mamaril, by adding a NPC named after him in Borderlands 2. Additionally, Gearbox posted a eulogy to Mamaril in the voice of the game character Claptrap. For their game MechWarrior Online, developer Piranha Games sold a custom in-game unit called a Jenner, honoring the daughter of a player of the game. CAD122,210 was donated to the Canadian Cancer Society. Losing his wife Pauline to ovarian cancer, Minecraft player "GasBandit" built a memorial for her. When players of the online game Final Fantasy XIV heard that fellow gamer "Codex Vahla" was in the hospital on life support, they held a digital wake.

A significant area of research focuses on the representation of non-Western traditions. In the game Far Cry 4, the setting of Kyrat is deeply influenced by Himalayan Buddhism and Hinduism. Scholar Souvik Mukherjee states how games often use religious iconography—such as prayer wheels, shrines, and thangka paintings—to create an "exotic" atmosphere for players. In his analysis, Mukherjee points out that while the "Shangri-La" missions allow players to interact with ancient myths, they often simplify complex theological concepts into combat-oriented goals, which can be seen as a form of cultural appropriation or a "sanitized" version of faith.

Karma or "morality" systems are employed in many contemporary role-playing games to evaluate the player's deeds, like Fallout or Mass Effect, which is forcing players to make difficult choices that can affect their character's "spiritual" standing within the game world. These systems allow players to experiment with different ethical frameworks in a safe environment. Researchers have noted that these mechanics often mirror real-world religious ethics, where good deeds are rewarded and bad deeds result in negative consequences, reinforcing the idea of a "just world".

=== Religious video games ===
Some religious groups use video games for education. An example is the Christian game Left Behind: Eternal Forces.

=== Use of video games in a religious setting ===
In May 2012, the Exeter Cathedral used Flower during its Sunday service.

During the COVID-19 pandemic, the Roblox platform has been used to stage virtual religious processions in lieu of in-person ceremonies due to quarantine restrictions, such as a server by devotees of the Black Nazarene in Quiapo, Manila where models based on the icon of the Black Nazarene and other icons were made. Similar virtual processions and religious ceremonies have also been staged by various Roman Catholic parishes in the Philippines and other countries by religious youth organizations.

== Controversies ==
Opinions on video games differ from religion and denomination; there are religious groups that use games actively to convert people, while some games are banned for religious reasons. Scholars of religious studies are also studying video games, by looking at the game and to the players and their experiences, with games like Journey. Religion is considered a serious real world topic, while video games are an art and entertainment. As such, developers and publishers sometimes take precaution not to offend people's religious beliefs. Religious references in the Japanese role-playing video game series Final Fantasy were originally censored for the U.S. release of the games. It was after the franchise switched to Sony's PlayStation with Final Fantasy VII that the religious references were left largely intact. Ubisoft's Assassin's Creed series show a disclaimer:

"Inspired by historical events and characters. This work of fiction was designed, developed and produced by a multicultural team of various religious faiths and beliefs." (Note: In Assassin's Creed: Syndicate, the words "sexual orientations and gender identities" were added.)

Despite efforts from some companies, there have been incidents with religious groups and video games. The German video game rating board USK gave The Binding of Isaac a 16+ rating, considering it "blasphemous".

=== Christianity ===
The game BioShock Infinite is heavily based on the notion of American exceptionalism at the turn of the 20th century, and incorporates notions taken from Christianity to support the game's dystopian themes. One aspect of this was the use of baptism. One developer on Irrational Games staff expressed strong concern to the lead developer, Ken Levine, that the game's presentation of baptism was highly controversial, leading Levine to consider baptism in relation to forgiveness rather than merely as a religious tenet. At least one player objected to the final changes, prompting them to request a refund from Steam. The scene was otherwise well received by critics as less a commentary on Christianity but on as a representation of themes such as free will, evil, rebirth and redemption that were central to the game.

=== Hinduism ===
On October 22, 2008, Microsoft announced that Fallout 3 would not be released in India on the Xbox 360 platform. Religious and cultural sentiments were cited as the reason. Although the specific reason was not revealed in public, it is possible that it is because the game contains two-headed mutated cows called Brahmin, or that Brahmin is also the name of an ancient, powerful hereditary caste of Hindu priests and religious scholars in India, or its similarity to the spelling of brahman, a type of cow that originated in India. Brahman, a breed of Zebu, are revered by Hindus.

The action game Hanuman: Boy Warrior was criticized by Rajan Zed, president of the Universal Society of Hinduism, for portraying the Hindu deity Hanuman. Developed and published in India by Aurona Technologies, the player controls Hanuman. "Controlling and manipulating Lord Hanuman with a joystick/button/keyboard/mouse [is] denigration", said Zed. "Lord Hanuman was not meant to be reduced to just a 'character' in a video game to solidify [a] company/product's base in the growing economy of India." He urged Sony, the publisher of the game, to pull the game. Sony's regional manager however said that Hanuman: Boy Warrior sold beyond their expectations.

Zed was also critical of the use of Hindu deities in the MOBA game Smite. In response, developer Hi-Rez Studios COO Todd Harris said that Smite would still be featuring Hindu deities, possibly adding more. GameSpot asked if characters based upon Abrahamic religions would be added as well, but Harris said that "the key Abrahamic figures—Adam, Noah, Moses, Jesus, Muhammad, are not that interesting in character design or gameplay".

The Japanese role-playing game Shin Megami Tensei IV: Apocalypse was criticized by Rajan Zed for portraying the Hindu god Krishna.

=== Islam ===
In the original release version of The Legend of Zelda: Ocarina of Time, an Islamic prayer chant was included in the music of the Fire Temple. The developers at Nintendo were initially unaware of the chant's significance as it was taken from a commercially available sound library, but removed it in later versions to prevent offending any Muslim players.

LittleBigPlanet had a last-minute delay involving a licensed song in the game's soundtrack, after a PlayStation Community member reported that the lyrics to one of the licensed songs in the game included passages from the Qur'an and could therefore be offensive to Muslims. However, no actual complaints regarding the music were made. The song, entitled "Tapha Niang", was by Malian artist Toumani Diabaté, himself a devout Muslim. The game was patched twice, the day before its release for players who had received the game early, before its intended release date. The first update did not affect the song, whilst the second updated the game to remove the vocals from the track, leaving only an instrumental. Some American Muslims responded to the recall and stated that they were offended by the restriction of freedom of speech. M. Zuhdi Jasser M.D., head of the American Islamic Forum for Democracy, was quoted as saying, "Muslims cannot benefit from freedom of expression and religion and then turn around and ask that anytime their sensibilities are offended that the freedom of others be restricted."

The fighting game Injustice: Gods Among Us was temporarily banned in the United Arab Emirates and Kuwait. Originally, the title of the game was rebranded as Injustice: The Mighty Among Us for promotional uses in those areas. It is speculated that Injustice was banned because of the inclusion of the word 'Gods' in the title, the cleavage exposed in the outfits of some female characters, and overall bloodiness. Eventually, the ban in the United Arab Emirates and Kuwait was lifted.

=== Sikhism ===
Hitman 2: Silent Assassin sparked controversy due to a level featuring the killing of Sikhs within a depiction of their most holy site, the Harmandir Sahib, where hundreds of Sikhs were massacred in 1984. An altered version of Silent Assassin was eventually released with the related material removed from the game.

== Religion and violence ==
A study released by the University of Missouri stated that video games often emphasize the violent aspects of religion. Researcher Greg Perreault said "It doesn't appear that game developers are trying to purposefully bash organized religion in these games, I believe they are only using religion to create stimulating plot points in their story lines".

== Games as focus of religious studies ==
For many years video games were seen as mere entertainment, a form of "low culture". Playing video games was seen as a form of escapism and the medium was not regarded as a valid object of scientific research. To "play" games as a scholarly pursuit was thought of as "ludicrous". It has only been in recent years that video games have become the object of scientific study. Looking at the game as an object, researchers can explore religious and spiritual references. Video game research is done in two ways; the game can be studied as an object, while actor-focused research looks at the player.

=== Game-immanent approach ===
Video games, as products of human culture, can be seen and read as "texts". They carry myths, stories and symbols of the time in which they were created. By "reading" video games, philosophers, sociologists and theologians have the opportunity to study the religious and spiritual themes in video games. This can be done in several ways.

- by studying the design, rules and mechanics or by talking to the developers
- by watching others play (e.g. Let's Play videos)
- by playing the game themselves

=== Player-focused approach ===
Video games are interactive; it requires input from the player to happen. While a video game developer designs the game, including its rules and story, it is up to the player to make the game "happen". As such, it is up to individual player to give meaning to their experience.

Video games allow the player to think, form and possibly change their own opinion about religious and spiritual matters. Players often discuss these elements on online platforms. For instance, some players made their own version of the player character Commander Shepard of the Mass Effect series an atheist, while others thought of him/her (Note: Commander Shepard can be female or male.) as a Christian. As such, video games also give new meaning to the concept of religion.

== See also ==
- God game
- List of Christian video games
