= Journey of Jesus: The Calling =

2012 video game

Journey of Jesus
- Developer: Lightside Games
- Publisher: Lightside Games
- Platform: Browser
- Release: May 15, 2012
- Mode: Single-player

Journey of Jesus: The Calling is a browser game developed by Lightside Games. It was released as a Facebook browser game.

== Gameplay ==
In Journey of Jesus, the player takes the role of Jesus Christ, performing miracles such as healing the sick and walking on water.

== Development ==
Journey of Jesus: The Calling was developed by Lightside Games. Self-described as the first-ever video game about Jesus Christ, Lightside's CEO Brent Dusing wanted players to "walk in the Messiah’s steps, in an authentic experience of Israel in Christ’s time."

The game was released on May 15, 2012. The same day, Blizzard Entertainment's Diablo 3 was also released. Lightside acknowledged the timing by having an image of Jesus fighting Diablo in a boxing ring on "Journey of Jesus's" Facebook page.

== Reception ==
The game was praised by Christian leaders. Darrell L. Bock, research professor at the Dallas Theological Seminary, said the game would take players closer to Jesus in a "fun, reflective and entertaining way".

Kotaku's Luke Plunkett called the gameplay of the game "horrific" due to its emphasis on microtransactions, which in his view was antithetical to the idea of the game. He commented that it squandered the potential of the Bible, and especially the Old Testament, as an "amazing story".
