= I Am Jesus Christ =

2026 video game

- Developer: SimulaM
- Publisher: PlayWay
- Engine: Unreal Engine 5
- Platform: Windows
- Release: 2 April 2026
- Genre: Simulation
- Mode: Single-player

I Am Jesus Christ is a 2026 Christian simulation video game developed by SimulaM and published by PlayWay. The player takes the role of Jesus Christ during the events depicted in the New Testament.

I Am Jesus Christ was conceived from the designer's desire to portray Jesus Christ's life from a first-person perspective. The game was announced in 2019, with a prologue released as a free demo in 2022. It was launched on 2 April 2026 for Windows.

== Gameplay ==
The player controls Jesus Christ in first-person view. The game interface shows only the character's hands; in general it avoids depicting the face or any canonical appearance of Jesus. I Am Jesus Christ has elements of role-playing games, visual novels, and is a partially open world game.

The player controls Jesus through the events of the New Testament: leaving Nazareth, finding his Twelve Apostles, delivering sermons, and performing miracles. The game is set in a series of locations that depict well-known moments from Jesus's life, such as turning water into wine and spending 40 days and nights in the desert. The game ends with the crucifixion of Jesus, though this is depicted symbolically to avoid the depiction of violence.

== Development and release ==
Developer SimulaM is a five-person development team based in Warsaw, Poland. CEO Maksym Vysochanskiy identifies as Christian and described himself as "very amazed by Him during my reading of the Bible". The idea of the game was first conceived in Vysochanskiy's teenage years. He initially wanted to make a computer animated film about the life of Jesus, but later changed the format to a video game to be able to depict it in first-person.

The game was officially announced in 2019. A prologue demo was released on 1 December 2022. The game was featured at IGN Fan Fest in 2023 and released on 2 April 2026.

== Reception ==
The announcement and trailer of the game drew controversy, as some worried the game would be blasphemous, trivialize scripture, or that it was a publicity stunt. A tweet of the game's trailer by IGN racked up nearly 70,000 reactions, consisting of critique from readers. In the launch week, the game received a "Very Positive" user rating on Steam.

Writing for Inven about the released game, Jeong Jae-hoon reflected on the use of intellectual property in games, considering that I Am Jesus Christ used possibly the most well-known IP. They commented that the game might be a good vessel for Bible study, but considered it to be more of a bible study simulator than a game, and also called the implementation clumsy.

4News's Richard Amalfitano considered the game's concept to be unique, finding it hard to evaluate as a video game. They found the concept and some gameplay ideas original, and found that the game translated its source material well into an interactive form. However, they described the gameplay as superficial, and criticized technical aspects including the character animations and the use of artificial intelligence for the game's voice acting.
