= The Bible Game =

2005 video game

- Developers: Mass Media (PS2, Xbox); Alpine Studios (GBA)
- Publishers: NA: Crave Entertainment; EU: 505 GameStreet
- Platforms: Game Boy Advance, PlayStation 2, Xbox
- Release: NA: October 18, 2005; NA: October 30, 2005 (GBA); EU: June 30, 2006 (PS2)
- Genres: Christian, party
- Modes: Single-player, multiplayer

The Bible Game is a Christian party game published by Crave Entertainment in North America and 505 GameStreet in Europe. The console version was developed by Mass Media and the Game Boy Advance version was developed by Alpine Studios. It is aimed at Christians and is "family-friendly." There are a variety of trivia questions related to the Old Testament. The main two modes are "TV Game Show" and "Challenge Games." The latter lets players choose any minigame.

== Gameplay ==
In the Game Boy Advance version players explore different maps searching for demons. When the player finds one, they must hit the demon with their Bible. At this point the demon challenges the player to Bible trivia in exchange for a piece of key (which opens the end level destination, the church). The home console version features a game show-themed party mode where players compete for the most points and play various Christian-themed minigames.

== Development and release ==
The Bible Game was featured at E3 2005 and was playable at demo kiosks. It was developed by Mass Media, Inc. and published by Crave Entertainment. When asked why they chose to publish a religious game, Crave Entertainment Rob Dyer exclaimed that he wanted to try publishing a different kind of game, given the similarity between Crave's catalogue of games, citing games such as Tomb Raider. Dyer wanted to make a nonviolent game, but also wanted to avoid making a preachy one either. Dyer explained that he did not make the game for personal religious reasons; rather, he desired to fill niches that other publishers did not.

== Reception ==
Reception

Aggregate score
Aggregator	Score		
Aggregator	GBA	PS2	Xbox
Metacritic	35/100	53/100	60/100

Review scores
Publication	Score		
Publication	GBA	PS2	Xbox
Eurogamer	N/A	5/10	N/A
GamesMaster	N/A	49%	N/A
GameSpot	N/A	5.4/10	5.4/10
IGN	3.5/10	6.5/10	6.5/10
PlayStation Official Magazine – UK	N/A	4/10	N/A
PSM3	N/A	43%	N/A
TeamXbox	N/A	N/A	6.1/10
X-Play	N/A	N/A	2/5
CiN Weekly	N/A	78/100	78/100

The PlayStation 2 and Xbox versions received "mixed or average reviews," while the Game Boy Advance version received "unfavorable" reviews, according to the review aggregation website Metacritic. G4TV writer Greg Bemis was critical of the game in his review of the Xbox version. He criticized the game show mechanic and felt that most mini-games were of poor quality, though he felt there were a couple that were the exception. CiN Weekly PJ Hruschak called it a "cheesy game show," though felt that it would appeal to young children, and adults will appreciate its "innocent humor." He also felt that the price point made it a good pick for children to enjoy. IGN writer Juan Castro felt it lacked the "biblical depth" to attract religious people, while also criticizing the mini-games as not being engaging. However, he noted that if a parent was looking for a cheap, non-violent game for their kids, they "could definitely do worse." IGN writer Mark Bozon's review of the Game Boy Advance version was critical, pointing out how poor the gameplay is and how many bugs it has. Eurogamer writer John Walker felt that it was "well-presented" and "contemporary in design" but still "shallow." He felt that there was only a small niche of people who might enjoy it. In discussing mainstream Christian video games, Vice author Emanuel Maiberg described The Bible Game as one of the better examples of a game that came close to the mainstream. GameSpot writer Bob Colayco was critical of the game, calling it "mediocre." He felt that it would be a Christian family friendly product and felt they would enjoy its "commercial Christian pop soundtrack." He felt that the mini-games were "basic" and lacking in variety.
