= Saints of Virtue =

1999 video game

- Developer: SHINE Studios
- Engine: 3D Gamestudio
- Platform: Microsoft Windows
- Release: July 1999
- Genres: Action, first-person shooter
- Mode: Single-player

Saints of Virtue is a 3D medieval first-person shooter video game developed by Shine Studios and published by Cactus Game Design. Released in 1999, it was one of the first Christian first person shooter games, and led to the release of other medieval/ancient FPS games of the same style.

== Plot ==
The game takes place in a world allegorical to the spiritual aspects of the human heart. The player represents a Christian who enters his own heart to do battle with spiritual forces of temptation and to become a true 'Saint of Virtue.'

== Development ==
Saints of Virtue was first conceived in October 1997 by three people who wanted to tap into the Christian video game market, the development wrapped in 16 months and Saints of Virtue was released in July 1999 in Christian bookstores. The game also sold around 15,000 copies. The programmer of the game was Dave Slayback who was also a former programmer at Sierra. Michael Ulrich designed the game and he is currently working on the art team at 2K Sports. Bud Gillian was a teacher.

== Gameplay ==
The game features four levels, each representing a spiritual obstacle to the player's journey towards becoming a 'Saint of Virtue'. Enemies – floating masks representative of negative moral choices – appear frequently in the game, and must be destroyed using the Sword of the Spirit, which fires blue bolts. Players can pick up power-ups like the Shield of Faith, which reduces the damage taken by enemies, and "Spiritual health", which boosts the player's health bar.

Gameplay screenshot

== Discontinuation ==
After an extended period of time supporting the game, Shine Studios decided to discontinue the game in 2014 at the same time that the website (http://www.saintsofvirtue.com/) was set to expire. The game is no longer available for purchase digitally, and finding a CD version of the game is becoming increasingly difficult.
