= Menace Beach =

1990 video game

- Menace Beach box art
- Developer: Color Dreams
- Publishers: Color Dreams; Hacker International (Asia)
- Composers: Vance Kozik, Roger Deforest
- Platform: NES/Family Computer
- Release: AS: 1990; NA: 1990
- Genre: Side scroller
- Mode: Single-player

Menace Beach is a video game released for the Nintendo Entertainment System by Color Dreams in 1990. Like all Color Dreams games, Menace Beach was not officially licensed by Nintendo. It was re-released as part of the Maxivision 15-in-1 multicart.

== Gameplay ==
The player controls a skateboarding hero named Scooter (modeled after Nina Stanley's then-5 year old son Alex) whose girlfriend, Bunny, has been kidnapped by Demon Dan. An introduction screen shows Bunny shackled and pleading for help. The hero must use his skateboard and any objects he finds, such as balloons, frogs, bombs, and bottles, to defeat ninjas, clowns, and disgruntled dockworkers before finally confronting the villainous Demon Dan. Between levels, the girlfriend's clothes fall apart, and when the second-to-last level is completed, she is in her underwear.

== Sunday Funday ==
Menace Beach was re-released as Sunday Funday.

Color Dreams was renamed Wisdom Tree and Menace Beach was redesigned with a Christian theme as Sunday Funday in 1995. The player controls a skateboarding hero who is late for Sunday school. The hero must use his skateboard and any objects he finds, such as balloons, grapefruits, and newspapers, to defeat bullies, clowns, and businessmen who impede his path to Sunday school.

Sunday Funday features gameplay identical to Menace Beach.

The hero carries a Bible in Sunday Funday, but not in Menace Beach. The hero's girlfriend from Menace Beach is replaced by a fully clothed Sunday school teacher.

The game cartridge includes two other games: an arcade-style puzzle game titled Fish Fall, a rendition of an unreleased Color Dreams game called Free Fall which was interspersed with Bible verses, and a sing-along of "The Ride", a song by Christian pop band 4Him.

The game was released in Asia as Miss Peach World (ミスピーチワールド, Misu Pīchi Wārudo). It replaces the player character with a female and includes eroge images between levels, although contrary to the title and label artwork, it does not feature Princess Peach. The music, and some graphics and level backgrounds, were changed.
