= Super 3D Noah's Ark =

1994 video game

- Title screen
- Developer: Wisdom Tree
- Publisher: Wisdom Tree
- Composer: Vance Kozik
- Engine: Wolfenstein 3D engine
- Platforms: Super Nintendo Entertainment System, MS-DOS, Microsoft Windows, Mac OS X, Linux
- Release: Super NES: NA: 1994; MS-DOS: NA: 1995; Windows, OS X, Linux: WW: June 23, 2015
- Genre: First-person shooter
- Mode: Single-player

Super 3D Noah's Ark is a non-violent Christian first-person shooter developed and published by Wisdom Tree for the Super Nintendo Entertainment System (SNES) in 1994 and MS-DOS in 1995. Its gameplay is similar to that of Wolfenstein 3D, as Wisdom Tree had licensed that game's engine from id Software. Wisdom Tree opted not to secure a license from Nintendo for the game's Super NES release. While not illegal, it prevented the game from being sold at most video game retailers, which were under a contractual agreement with Nintendo not to sell unlicensed games for the company's consoles. As a result, the Super NES release of Super 3D Noah's Ark was sold primarily via Christian bookstores.

The game was re-released for Windows, macOS, and Linux on itch.io on May 26, 2014 and Steam on June 23, 2015.

== Gameplay ==
Super 3D Noah's Ark plays similarly to Wolfenstein 3D, and utilizes the same game engine

The game plays similarly to Wolfenstein 3D, but the graphics were changed to reflect a non-violent theme. Instead of killing Nazi soldiers in a castle, the player takes the part of Noah, wandering the Ark, using a slingshot to shoot sleep-inducing food at angry attacking animals, mostly goats, in order to render them unconscious. The animals behave differently: goats, the most common enemy, will only kick Noah, while the other animals such as sheep, ostriches, antelopes and oxen will shoot spittle at him from a distance. Goats are also unable to open doors, while the other animals can.

The gameplay is aimed at young children. Noah's Ark includes secret passages, food, weapons and extra lives. There are secret levels, and shortcut levels as well. The player eventually comes across larger and more powerful slingshots, and flings coconuts and watermelon at the larger boss-like animals, such as Ernie the Elephant and Carl the Camel.

== Development ==
The game that would eventually become Super 3D Noah's Ark was originally conceived as a licensed game based on the film Hellraiser, a movie that Wisdom Tree founder Dan Lawton was a great fan of. Wisdom Tree acquired the game rights to Hellraiser for $50,000, along with a license to use the Wolfenstein 3D game engine from id Software, believing that the fast, violent action of Wolfenstein would be a good match for the mood of the film. Development initially began on the Nintendo Entertainment System, with Wisdom Tree intending to ship the game on a special cartridge that came equipped with a co-processor that could increase the system's RAM and processing speed several times over.

Eventually the Hellraiser game concept was abandoned due to several issues: the hardware of the NES was found unsuitable because of its low color palette and the addition of a co-processor would have made the cartridge far too expensive for consumers. According to Vance Kozik of Wisdom Tree, little progress was made on the NES incarnation of the game, which he described as "a barely up-and-running demo". The platform for Hellraiser was then switched to the PC, and the developers were able to make more progress on this version. However, by the time the first prototype was finished, Doom had been released, and Wisdom Tree felt that Hellraiser would not be able to compete. In addition, the management at Wisdom Tree decided that developing and publishing a horror-themed game would clash with their religious, family-friendly image. With these factors in mind, Wisdom Tree decided to let their Hellraiser license expire, transfer development to the Super Nintendo Entertainment System, and redesign the game with a Christian theme, eventually coming up with a game about Noah's Ark.

As the game was not officially sanctioned by Nintendo, Wisdom Tree devised a pass-through system similar to the Game Genie to bypass the system's copy protection, where the player had to insert an officially licensed Super NES game into the cartridge slot on top of the Super 3D Noah's Ark cartridge.

A popular rumor claims that id Software licensed the Wolfenstein 3D engine to Wisdom Tree in retaliation against Nintendo for the content restrictions Nintendo placed on the Super NES version of Wolfenstein 3D. In actuality, Wisdom Tree offered id Software very lucrative terms for the Wolfenstein 3D game engine, which id regarded as having already outlived its usefulness, and id staff have stated that they never had any problems with Nintendo in the first place.

== Re-release ==
In January 2014, to mark the game's 20th anniversary, Wisdom Tree licensed the game to Piko Interactive for a digital re-release and a Super NES cartridge reproduction run. Cartridges were initially available to order via email before an order page was established on the Piko Interactive website. The digital re-release, dubbed the "20th Anniversary Edition", used the ECWolf source port developed for Wolfenstein 3D and ZDoom to support modern controllers and enable widescreen gameplay. Developed for Windows, macOS, and Linux, the game released on itch.io on May 26, 2014 and Steam on June 23, 2015. The digital re-release also includes digital copies of the game's original Super NES and MS-DOS versions for use in emulators.

== See also ==
- Chex Quest
- Christian media
