= Christian video game =

Video game based upon Christian teaching

Christian video games are a video game genre and a form of Christian media that focus on the narrative and themes of Christian morals and Christianity. The term can also refer to Christian symbolism, mythology, media franchises, and Christian media organizations within video game culture and industry.

== Game design ==
These games usually emphasize the teachings of the ministry of Jesus, or retell Bible stories such as Noah's Ark or the life of Jesus. While Christian video games are considered a genre, they usually intersect with other genres, such as early computer title Bible Computer Games which is an educational game, action-adventure games Spiritual Warfare and Super 3D Noah's Ark, the Guitar Praise series of rhythm games, or the simulation video game I Am Jesus Christ. They are usually developed to appeal to Christian audiences.

Many of the earliest Christian video games were written by the company BibleBytes in 1982 for the TRS-80 Color Computer. That year, the company released eleven games for the computer, including such titles as Manna from Heaven, Moses' Rod, and Noah's Ark. These games were compiled together and released under the name Bible Computer Games. Several Christian-themed computer programming books, based on the original BibleBytes Bible Computer Games source code, were written by John and Joyce Conrod in 1984. The Conrods were the primary authors of the first two books while their son, Phil Conrod, was one of the original game developers and served as technical editor. The first BASIC programming book, "Computer Bible Games", included the BASIC source code for the Timex/Sinclair, Radio Shack TRS-80 Color Computer, and TI-99/4A. The book included tips for adapting the programs for the Apple II, Atari 8-bit computers, VIC-20, Commodore 64, and TRS-80 Since then, PC Enterprises and BibleByte Books has published several "Computer Bible Games" programming books for Microsoft Small Basic, Visual Basic, Visual C# and Java. Another Christian video game pioneer was Bernard K. Bangley, who wrote Bible BASIC: Bible Games for Personal Computers with his son, David Bangley. Bible BASIC was published by Harper & Row in December, 1983. His book included type-in BASIC programs to create Bible games. All of these Bible themed programming books were designed for Christian schools.

The annual Christian Game Developers Conference (CGDC) was started in 2001 by Tim Emmerich, founder of the small independent studio GraceWorks Interactive. The conference has been described as a place for Christian game developers to gather, make deals with other Christian developers, and gain encouragement from developers with a shared faith.

Game Developer, affiliated with the Game Developers Conference, featured an article by Greg Campbell titled "How to Handle Christianity in Video Games" in 2018. The article covered historical depictions of Christianity in video games, and suggested how developers can incorporate Christianity into their Christian game design.

== Production ==
While other Christian media formats such as music, literature, and film have big budget record labels, publishers, and blockbusters, the Christian video game industry has primarily been led by indie games and is generally devoid of AAA developers. This has led to criticism related to quality control concerns.

Many major publishers and studios are highly diversified, with brands under their moniker with both Christian media and video game culture. This would include mass media Warner Bros. Discovery which owns Warner Bros. Interactive Entertainment, Rooster Teeth and distributes the independent record label Word Entertainment, major media conglomerates like NBCUniversal which is parent company of both Big Idea Entertainment and G4 Media. While companies like G4 are not Christian media outlets, NBCUniversal operates both VeggieTales Christian studio Big Idea Entertainment and G4 Media, formerly the G4 TV network, as in-name only production units. Similarly Warner Bros. Discovery operates their interactive and Rooster Teeth studios separately from the distribution of Word Entertainment.

== History ==
=== 1980s–1990s ===
Some of the early Christian video games are sought after by computer museums, particularly video game museums and private video game collections. This is due to them being distributed in small numbers at hobbyist conventions or at Christian bookstores and magazines, instead of high-volume video game retailers. One such example is the 1983 Atari 2600 game Red Sea Crossing, of which only two copies are known to have appeared on the resale market, one of which sold for over $10,000 in 2013. Another such Atari 2600 game was the 1982 The Music Machine, which sold for over $5,000 in 2017.

The 1980s also saw the earliest video game adaptations of Narnia, in the form of Adventures in Narnia and Adventures in Narnia: Dawn Treader. None of these games released on the NES, probably due to Nintendo of America's strict guidelines against religious content at the time. Nintendo of America's corporate stance at the time was that religious symbolism was forbidden. Nevertheless, even officially developed Nintendo of Japan products sometimes featured Christian symbols; for example, The Legend of Zelda featured a Christian cross on Link's shield. One of the first NES games to use overt Christian symbolism was Castlevania, a game which followed a Christian vampire hunter named Simon Belmont who carried weaponry such as holy water, crosses that function as boomerangs, and a blue rosary which cleared all on-screen enemies. Konami released a game based on Noah's Ark in Europe, but was never released in the United States, due to the aforementioned reluctance of Nintendo of America towards religious content. Nintendo of America's viewpoint on religious content at the time has been criticized, it even caused the censorship and modification of small-scale Christian iconography including 1989's DuckTales and Castlevania III: Dracula's Curse. Starting in the late 1980s, the unlicensed game developer Wisdom Tree developed a number of specifically Christian video games for the NES, such as Spiritual Warfare. As time went on Nintendo of America reversed their stance on religious material, now even overtly Christian games release on Nintendo platforms, just as Nintendo of Japan had always allowed.

In 1994, Wisdom Tree licensed the id Software Wolfenstein 3D engine for the SNES game Super 3D Noah's Ark. The game has been reprinted and rereleased a number of times since.

After the Columbine High School massacre in 1999, there was a revival of Christian video games specifically in the first-person shooter genre. Ralph Bagley of N'Lightning Software claims that publishers were more receptive to the concept of a Christian first-person shooting game with less violence because violent video games like Doom or Quake were facing controversy at the time due to the Columbine massacre. The first Christian FPS game to be released in July 1999 was Saints of Virtue, developed by Shine Studios, a small video game company that was run by three people. In October 1999, The War in Heaven was released by a small video game company called Eternal Warriors. The game was developed by Andrew Lunstad and designed by Theodore Beale.

=== 2000s–present ===
During the 2000s, N'Lightning Software Development released two first-person shooter games: Catechumen (2000) and Ominous Horizons: A Paladin's Calling (2001). The annual Christian Game Developers Conference (CGDC) was started in 2001.

In 2005, The Bible Game by Mass Media Games was released for the Game Boy Advance, PlayStation 2, and Xbox. That same year, the first version of Dance Praise was released by Digital Praise for PC.

The 2000s also saw the first adaptations of Christian media franchises for major video game platforms. Those include games based on The Lord of the Rings and The Chronicles of Narnia film series, including The Lord of the Rings: The Two Towers (2002), The Lord of the Rings: The Return of the King (2003), The Chronicles of Narnia: The Lion, the Witch and the Wardrobe (2005), and The Chronicles of Narnia: Prince Caspian (2008), as well as the VeggieTales franchise in the form of LarryBoy and the Bad Apple (2006) for the Game Boy Advance and PlayStation 2. In 2006, Left Behind: Eternal Forces, a real-time strategy game, was released by Inspired Media Entertainment based on Left Behind series of novels; it had sequels released in 2007, 2010, and 2011.

The Adam's Venture games, first released in 2009, have made appearances on PlayStation 3, PlayStation 4, Xbox One, and Nintendo Switch.

The 1980s Christian anime Superbook, rebooted in 2011 as an animated series, has had educational video game adaptations from 2014 and onward for browsers and mobile devices.

The 2014 game That Dragon, Cancer was critically acclaimed as an example of video games as an art form; the game touches on the concepts of love, mortality, and faith. The game involves Christian couple Ryan and Amy Green raising their son Joel, who had been diagnosed with cancer. The experience was the subject of the documentary film Thank You for Playing, and the couple were awarded the Games for Impact award at The Game Awards.

Steam has allowed indie games to reach a wider audience. The Wisdom Tree games Super 3D Noah's Ark and Spiritual Warfare were ported to the service by Piko Interactive in 2015 and 2017, and the role-playing simulation title I Am Jesus Christ launched in 2019, that same year Shepherd of Light was released by John Paul the Great Catholic University, and in 2021 action-adventure game John Christian and the turn-based RPG Paladin Dream were released.

By the 2020s, a number of Christian ministries to gamers had established themselves such as Love Thy Nerd, Nerd Culture Ministry Summit. In addition to the Christian Game Developer Conference, other conferences for Christian video game industry professionals had emerged such as Imladris.

== Christian video game journalism ==
Christian video game journalism is common for Christian news and media outlets. Some churches are known to incorporate game journalism into their services, which former theology student turned video game journalist Andy Robertson did with an interactive sermon involving the game Abzû.

In 1984, then-editor and president of Christianity Today V. Gilbert Beers and his son Ronald A. Beers worked for Baker Book House and co-authored Bible stories for children in the form of the Baker Street Kids franchise, which consists of the titular gang of children who dress up for a Sunday school play and reenact stories from the Bible. The books were adapted into educational computer games in which religious youth must answer questions about Bible stories correctly before they get treated to a little light animation; the games were distributed by Baker Book House, developed by Brian A. Rice Inc., and published by Educational Publishing Concepts for Apple II and Commodore 64. Series 1 (Early Heroes of the Bible, Searching for a King, The Boy Jesus, and The Early Church) was released in 1984, and Series 2 (Moses and the Wilderness Wanderings, A Week That Changed the World, Paul's Missionary Journeys, and Israel's Golden Years) was released in 1985–86.

Major Christian news outlets Christianity Today, Christian Broadcasting Network, Relevant, and Trinity Broadcasting Network, often include video game journalism as a part of their coverage. And some outlets specialize in video game culture including Christ Centered Gamer and Geeks Under Grace, journalists at these outlets often work for other outlets as well.

== See also ==
- List of Christian video games
