= Adam's Venture =

- Developer: Vertigo Digital Entertainment
- Publisher: Soedesco
- Composer: Jonathan van de Wijngaarden
- Engine: Unreal Engine 3 Unity 5 (Origins)
- Platforms: Microsoft Windows; PlayStation 3; PlayStation 4; Xbox One; Nintendo Switch
- Release: Episode 1: 2009; Episode 2: 2011; Episode 3: 2012; Chronicles: 2014; Origins: 2016
- Genre: Adventure
- Mode: Single-player

Adam's Venture is an episodic adventure game developed by Vertigo Games, a Dutch indie developer.

== Series ==
- Episode 1: The Search for the Lost Garden, was released on October 2, 2009
- Episode 2: Solomon's Secret was released on April 8, 2011
- Episode 3: Revelations was released on March 9, 2012.
- Chronicles, a compilation of all three episodes in one, with graphic and gameplay improvements, was released on February 4, 2014 for PlayStation 3 and on August 3, 2015 for PC.
- Origins, a reimagining spanning the story of the three episodes, adding a few elements but cutting many others, was released on April 1, 2016 for PlayStation 4, Xbox One and PC. It was later ported to Nintendo Switch on May 29, 2020.

== Story ==
The player directs the young explorer Adam Venture on a quest for the Garden of Eden and Solomon's Temple.

== Reception ==
Episode 1 received mixed reviews from critics, garnering a 52/100 on the review aggregation website Metacritic.
