= Exodus: Journey to the Promised Land =

1991 video game

- Developer(s): Color Dreams
- Publisher(s): Wisdom Tree
- Engine: Crystal Mines
- Platform(s): NES, Mega Drive, Game Boy, MS-DOS
- Release: 1991
- Genre(s): Puzzle/Christian
- Mode(s): Single-player

Exodus: Journey to the Promised Land is a video game released for the Nintendo Entertainment System by Color Dreams through its Wisdom Tree label in 1991. Like all Wisdom Tree games, Exodus was not officially licensed by Nintendo. It was ported to the Game Boy. Exodus is based on Crystal Mines, an earlier game from the company when it was known as Color Dreams.

According to the instruction manual, the player controls the biblical figure Moses as he leads the Israelites to the Promised Land, meaning he goes through a labyrinth. Moses has the ability to shoot glowing "W"s, which signify the word of God, to defeat enemies and remove obstacles. To finish each level, Moses must acquire five question marks as well as a certain amount of manna while avoiding enemies such as magicians and soldiers. After a level is completed, the player must answer five multiple choice Bible-related questions before advancing to the next level. After answering enough questions correctly, the player is rewarded with an extra life. The final 50 levels are a mirror of the first 50 with tougher enemies. At the intro screen, players can skip ahead in intervals of five levels until level 81.

The background music of the Exodus levels is to the theme of "Father Abraham" (a popular Christian children's song named after an iconic figure of the Old Testament).

== Legacy ==
Wisdom Tree later released a sequel to Exodus, titled Joshua, with slightly improved graphics and gameplay.

Joshua is based on the Biblical figure Joshua, who was Moses's apprentice in the Old Testament. He later became the leader of the Israelite tribes after the death of Moses. Joshua's most popular biblical story is about the taking back of the "promised land", where Joshua sent his men to march around the walls of the city of Jericho for seven days. After God saw his people's loyalty, he destroyed the city walls.

Similar to Moses shooting W's (to symbolize the word of God) in Exodus, Joshua shoots music notes which symbolize the music for the priest's trumpets.

Unlike its predecessor, Joshua has no level background music.

== See also ==
- Christian video games
