= The War in Heaven (video game) =

1999 video game

- Developer: Eternal Warriors
- Publisher: ValuSoft
- Designer: Vox Day
- Platform: Windows
- Release: October 1999

The War in Heaven is a 1999 Christian-themed action game that was published by Valusoft and distributed by GT Interactive. The game is described as "Doom-meets-the-Bible" and is intended for Christian males 15 and older.

== Gameplay ==
The War in Heaven is a Christian action game that blends elements of biblical themes with a fast-paced gameplay style. Players choose between two paths: the "Divine Path of Obedience," where they become a good angel and ascend toward heaven, or the "Fallen Path of Power," following Lucifer as a demon. The game features combat against supernatural foes, including angels and demons, while emphasizing spiritual warfare—a concept rooted in Christian theology. The War in Heaven incorporates violence but avoids excessive blood and gore.

== Development ==
The game was developed by Eternal Warriors, a company founded in 1996.

== Reception ==
Reception

Review score
Publication	Score
All Game Guide	1/5

Mike Musgrove from The Washington Post stated in his review of the game that "there's more activity in Sunday school than in this game".

=== Sales ===
The game sold 4,000 copies by March 2000 and later 10,000 copies by October 2000.
