= Bible Adventures =

1991 video game

- Box cover of Bible Adventures
- Developer: Wisdom Tree
- Publisher: Wisdom Tree
- Composer: Vance Kozik
- Platforms: NES (unlicensed), Mega Drive/Genesis, PC
- Release: 1991
- Genre: Side scroller/Platform game
- Mode: Single-player

Bible Adventures is a Christian video game by Wisdom Tree first released in 1991 for the Nintendo Entertainment System, and ported to the Mega Drive/Genesis in 1995. The game was unusual in that it was never sold in video game outlets. It contains three different games: Noah's Ark, Baby Moses, and David and Goliath, all of which are based rather loosely on stories from the Bible. The gameplay of these games is sidescroller style similar to that of Super Mario Bros. 2 for the NES. The game also features Jesu, Joy of Man's Desiring, by J. S. Bach, as the background music for the title screen. The game bypasses the 10NES lockout chip by emitting a voltage spike when the NES control deck is turned on.

== Gameplay ==
Noah carrying a stack of animals in Noah's Ark.

The game is a collection of three games based on stories contained in the Old Testament:

In Noah's Ark, the player must round up animals and food — sometimes by knocking animals out with an object that resembles a barrel or catching fruit thrown by a monkey — and carry them onto the Ark. Noah's health is recharged when the player reads Bible verses that are scattered around the four levels. Snakes seen on the trees are decoys; the real snakes the player has to capture are inside of a cave.

In Baby Moses, the player controls Miriam, Moses' sister, as she tries to save her brother from the Pharaoh's decree that all male Hebrew children be killed. In order to do this, the player carries Moses from one end of the level to the other, in a manner quite similar to the way in which characters in Super Mario Bros. 2 carry vegetables. Moses can be thrown around without harming him, but enemies cannot be harmed in any way. The adversaries attempt to throw Moses into the Nile. There is a quirk in the game that allows the player to throw Moses into the Nile, upon which the game says that the player forgot Moses.

In David and Goliath, the player starts out controlling David as he herds sheep and avoids predators such as lions and bears. Acorns can be used to stun the beasts. The player then obtains a sling and goes on to dodge guards, scorpions and stones before he fights Goliath's shield bearer and ultimately Goliath himself, whom the player must strike once in the head to defeat.

== Reception ==
The game was panned by critics for being overly didactic (e.g., gameplay is broken up by Bible verses), derivative of Super Mario Bros. 2, and poorly designed. It also has been criticized for its recycling of its other levels; each level contains similar objectives and the same style of gameplay. Nevertheless, it reportedly sold 350,000 copies in Christian bookstores. GamesRadar ranked it as the 68th worst game ever made. The staff criticized the developers for their choice of Bible stories to adapt and for the sloppy design.

Electronic Gaming Monthly's Seanbaby placed it as number 19 in his "20 worst games of all time" feature.
