= Power Player Super Joy III =

Home video game console

- Front of Power Player Super Joy III box
- Also known as: Power Games, XA-76-1E
- Manufacturer: Sinango
- Type: Home video game console
- Generation: Third generation
- Media: optional ROM cartridge ("Game Pak")
- CPU: NES on a Chip (MOS Technology 6502 core)
- Controller input: One built in, one extra, light gun

The Power Player Super Joy III (also known as Power Joy, Power Games, and XA-76-1E) is a famiclone video game console manufactured by Sinango. It is notable for legal issues based on the violation of intellectual property rights held by Nintendo and its various game licensees. The Power Player has been sold in North America, Brazil, Europe, Asia, and Australia.

== History ==
Back of Power Player Super Joy III box

When Nintendo discovered this product line, the company began strong legal action against importers and sellers of the consoles, and have obtained a temporary injunction against the import and sale of video game systems containing counterfeit versions of Nintendo games.

On December 16, 2004, the FBI executed search warrants at two kiosks at the Mall of America in Minnesota and also searched storage facilities rented by Yonatan Cohen, an owner of Perfect Deal LLC of Miami, Florida. The consoles, purchased wholesale at $7 to $9 each, sold for $30 to $70 each. After confiscating 1,800 units of Power Player, each containing 76 copyrighted video game titles belonging primarily to Nintendo or its licensees, Cohen was charged in Minneapolis, Minnesota in January 2005 with federal criminal infringement of copyright for selling Power Player video games at kiosks at the Mall of America and other malls across the nation. In April 2005, Cohen pleaded guilty to selling illegally copied video games.

Nine days after Cohen's guilty plea, 40 FBI agents arrested four Chinese nationals working in an international copyright infringement ring and seized 60,000 Power Player consoles in searches in Brooklyn, Queens, Manhattan, and Maple Shade, New Jersey.

In November 2005, Cohen was sentenced to five years in federal prison and was required to run ads in mall magazines to tell the public how he illegally sold knockoff video games at Mall of America kiosks. He would be deported to Israel after his sentence was complete. Several shopping malls quit selling these products, though the product was still sold by other dealers such as flea markets.

== Hardware ==
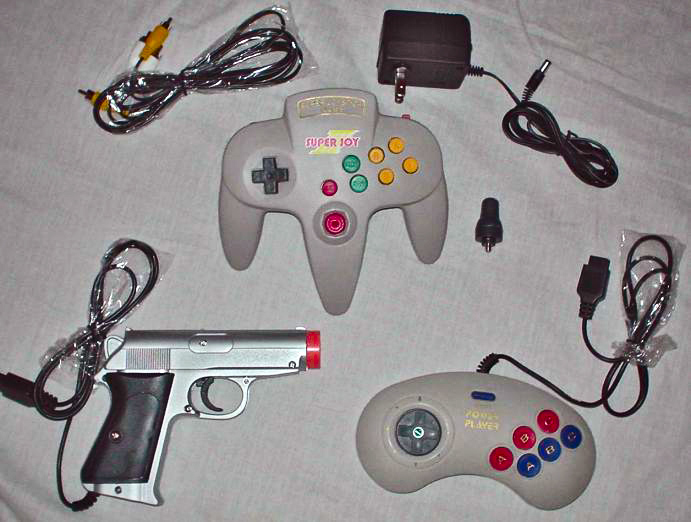
Power Player Super Joy III System

The system resembles a Nintendo 64 controller and attaches to a TV set. NTSC, PAL and SECAM versions are available. They all use a custom "NES-on-a-chip" (NOAC) that is an implementation of the Famicom/NES's hardware such as its custom 6502, PPU, and PAPU.

The units resemble a Nintendo 64 controller, sometimes with a 60-pin cartridge slot for Famicom cartridges. They come packaged with a secondary 9-pin 6 button controller resembling a Sega Genesis controller, intended for a second player. They are packaged with a 9-pin light gun resembling a Walther PPK pistol. There is a non-moving joystick, added for visual appeal. Though the Power Player Super Joy's button layout is identical to that of the Nintendo 64 controller, the buttons have been mapped differently. The C buttons of the Nintendo 64's controller function as A and B on the Super Joy, the A and B buttons of the Nintendo 64's controller are Start and Select on the Super Joy, respectively. Finally, the N64 controller's Start button is the Reset button on the Super Joy. The units are available in multiple colors, including black, grey, red, and blue.

The consoles have 76 built-in games, although marketing frequently claims to have more than 1,000 ways of playing them. Hence, the game count of 76,000 is listed as a gold sticker on the box. Most of the included games had been originally released for the Famicom or NES, but some have been created by the manufacturer. Most of the games have had their title screen graphics removed to save space on the ROM chip.

There are a number of scenes depicted on the front and back of the boxes, but all of them are artistic stylized drawings or retouched photos—none of them are actual game screenshots. Some versions sold in the US have an unlicensed still image from Star Wars: Episode I – The Phantom Menace on the front of the box.

After this product gained some popularity, the Power Player 3.5, an improved model with more games, was released. A wireless version of Power Games was also released.

The console can possibly have issues where it starts smoldering when turned on.

== List of built-in games ==
- On version 3.0 of PPSJ, all these items duplicated themselves circa 1,000 times; hence the claim to have 76,000 games built in when the true count is only 76. Version 3.5 has a more honest description and uses the titles once.
- In the games list, there is a message at the top that says "FUNTIME 76000 IN 1" or "FUNTIME 76 IN 1".
- Additional games can be played if a Famicom cartridge is inserted, or a NES cartridge is used with an adapter, although some hardware variants require the plastic housing to be trimmed to fit cartridges in the Famicom slot.
- Many of the game titles in the system menu are abbreviated, misspelled, use alternate names for the game, or are simply wrong (e.g. Burgertime and Tekken). In this list, an effort has been made to use the proper name for the games, with the PPSJ menu name in parentheses for known differences.
- This game incorporates menu selection sounds from the game Action 52.
- When the system starts up, the words "FUN TIME" appear flashing on the screen. (This may not show up on LCD TVs because the system gives off a weak TV signal and then improves later during gameplay.)

Built-in games may include the following:

1. 10-Yard Fight (listed as "10YF")
2. 1942
3. Antarctic Adventure (listed as "ANTARCTIC")
4. Arkanoid (listed as "ARKONOID")
5. Balloon Fight
6. Baseball
7. Battle City (In the ROM, the title screen says Tank A 1990, Tank M 1990, and Tank N 1990, and in the game selection menu, it is listed manifold times as "DESERT TANK", "SPEED TANK", and "ABRAMS TANK".)
8. Binary Land (listed as "BINARY", and "BINARY LAND" or "BINARY & LAND")
9. Bird Week
10. Bomberman
11. Brush Roller (listed as "BRUSH ROLL" and "PAINTER")
12. Circus Charlie (listed as "TOY STORY", and "CIRCUS CHABLIE" or "CURCUS CHARLIE")
13. Clay Shoot (listed as "CLAY SHOOTING") was actually part of Duck Hunt.
14. Clu Clu Land
15. Contra
16. Defender (listed as "DEFENDER II")
17. Devil World
18. Dig Dug (listed as "DIG DUG I")
19. Door Door
20. Donkey Kong Jr. (listed as "DONKEY KONG 2" and "MONKEY")
21. Donkey Kong Jr. Math (listed as "CALCULATOR")
22. Donkey Kong 3 (listed as "DONKEY KONG" or "KEYKONG 3")
23. Duck Hunt (listed as "SNOWFIELD SHOOT" and "DUCK HUNT")
24. Elevator Action (listed as "ELEVATOR")
25. Excitebike
26. Exerion
27. F1 Race (listed as "F1 RACE" or "F-1 RACE")
28. Field Combat (listed as "COMBAT")
29. Formation Z
30. Front Line
31. Galaga (listed as "GALAGA" or "GALAZA")
32. Golf
33. Gomoku Narabe Renju (listed as "CHESS", and "FIVE CHESS" or "CHINESE CHESS")
34. Gradius
35. Gyrodine
36. Hogan's Alley
37. Ice Climber
38. Ikki listed (as "KNIGHT")
39. Joust
40. Karateka (wrongly listed as "TEKKEN")
41. Life Force
42. Lode Runner (listed as "LODE RUNNER 2")
43. Lunar Pool (listed as "LUNAR BALL")
44. Magic Carpet 1001 (listed as "ALADDIN III"), taken directly from the "Caltron/Myriad 6-in-1" cartridge)
45. Magic Jewelry (listed as "JEWEL TETRIS")
46. Mahjong Taikai (listed as "MAJUN2")
47. Mario Bros. (listed as "MARIO BROS")
48. Mappy (listed as "MICE LOVE CAT", "MAPPY", and wrongly as "PACMAN")
49. Mighty Bomb Jack (listed as "BOMB JACK")
50. Millipede
51. MotoRace USA (listed as "ZIPPY RACE")
52. Ninja Kun (listed as "NINJA I")
53. Nuts & Milk (listed as "MILK & NUTS")
54. Pac-Man
55. Paperboy
56. Pinball (listed as "PINBALL" or "PIN BALL")
57. Pooyan
58. Popeye
59. Raid on Bungeling Bay (listed as "HELICOPTER" or "RAID ON BAY")
60. Road Fighter
61. Slalom (listed as "SLACOM" or "SLALOM")
62. Sky Destroyer
63. Space Invaders (listed as "SPACE ET")
64. Spartan X (listed as "SPARTANX"), more commonly known as Kung-Fu Master
65. Soccer (listed as "FIFA SOCCER")
66. Sqoon
67. Star Force
68. Stargate (listed as "STAE GATE" or "STAR GATE")
69. Super Arabian (listed as "ARABIAN")
70. Super Contra
71. The Super Dimension Fortress Macross (listed as "MAXCROSS" or "MACROSS")
72. Super Dyna'mix Badminton (listed as "SUPER DYNAMIX")
73. Super Mario Bros. (listed as "SUPER MARIO")
74. Super Soccer (listed as "SOCCER HEROES")
75. Tag Team Match: M.U.S.C.L.E. (listed as "WWF")
76. Tennis
77. Tetris (listed as "TETRIS 2"), by Tengen
78. TwinBee (listed as "TWIN BEE")
79. Urban Champion
80. Warpman (listed as "WARPMAN", and wrongly as "BURGERTIME")
81. Wild Gunman
82. World Soccer
83. Yie-Ar Kung Fu (listed as "KING OF FIGHTER" or "YIE AR KUNG FU" or "SPARTAN")

Note: That the list count is greater than 76, as different versions of the PowerPlayer include slightly different game sets.
