= N-Joypad =

Famicom clone manufactured by the Hong Kong-based company ABL

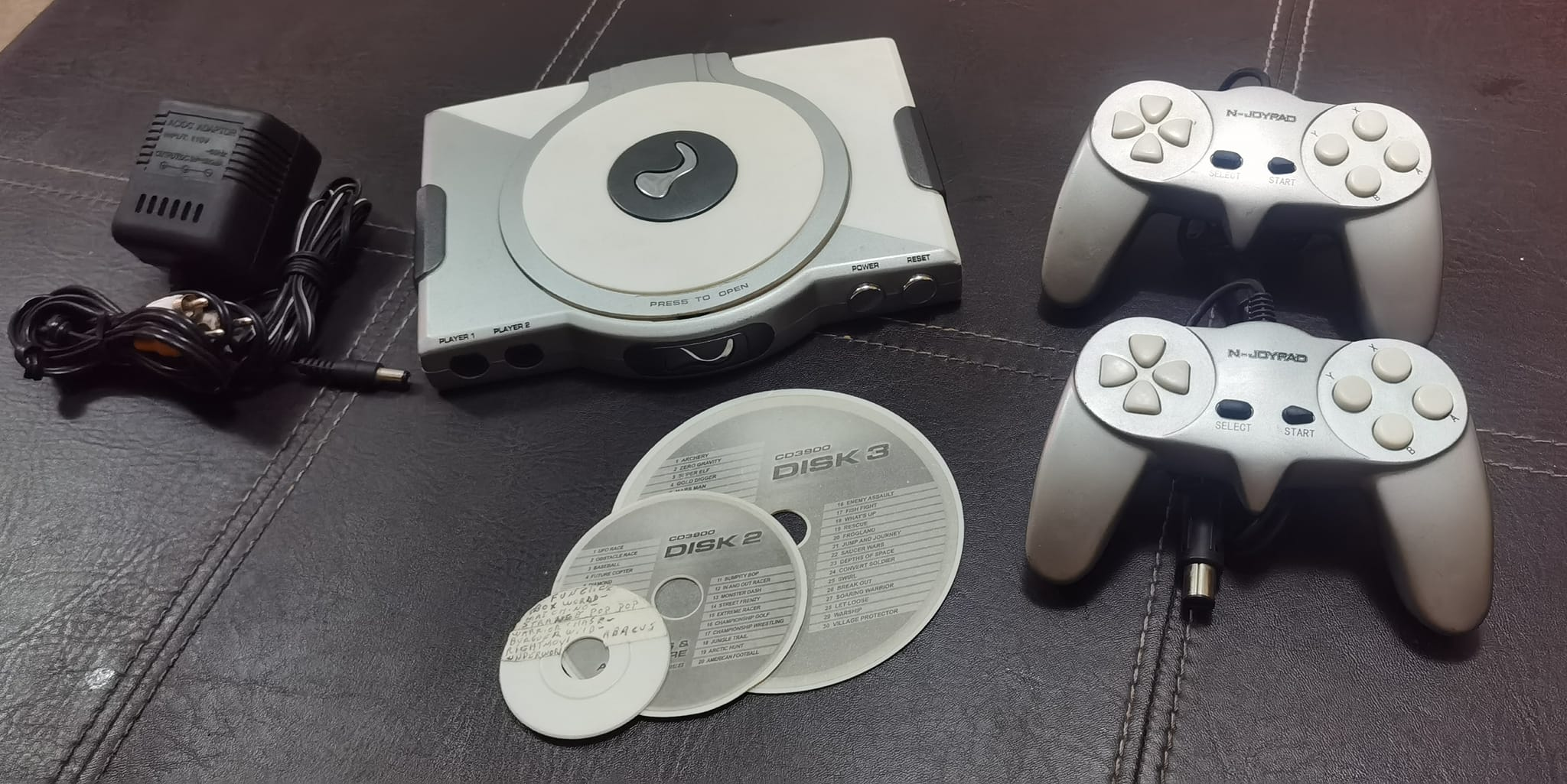
- CD3900 console with discs
- Also known as: CD3900, Console 59 Méga Jeux, Jogo para TV com CDs
- Developer: Advance Bright Limited
- Product family: Famicom hardware clone
- Type: Dedicated console
- Media: none (all games are built in)
- System on a chip: OneBus VT03
- Power: 4 AA batteries

The N-Joypad or CD3900 is a Famicom clone manufactured by the Hong Kong–based company Advance Bright Limited (ABL). There's no AC adapter, with the console running from four AA batteries.

== Design ==
This console is different from other clones because it does not use cartridges, relying instead on discs of different sizes resembling compact discs. When the player inserts one of these discs on the system, it triggers a combination of switches on the system allowing a unique selection of Famicom games to be chosen.

The system includes a total of 59 games, which are either original games produced in China, or pirate versions of licensed Famicom games with hacked music and/or graphics to hide their origin. The hacked games were mostly produced by a company called Inventor.

== Variants ==
N-Joypad is sold in Brazil as Jogo para TV com CDs, and in France as Console 59 Méga Jeux.

== Included games ==
The list below shows the names of the games as they appear on the selection menu of the system, followed by the original Famicom title and publisher.

Disc	Name	Original Famicom Title	Publisher
1- Intelligence Game Series	FUN CLICK	Pokéclick	Union Bond
1- Intelligence Game Series	BOX WORLD	Box World	Nice Code
1- Intelligence Game Series	MATCHING	Memory Puzzle	Nice Code
1- Intelligence Game Series	STRANGE POP POP	Magic Bubble	Nice Code
1- Intelligence Game Series	WARRIOR CHASE	Ninja-Kun: Majou No Bouken	Jaleco
1- Intelligence Game Series	BURGER BUILD	BurgerTime	Namco
1- Intelligence Game Series	RIGHT MOVE	Gomoku Narabe Renju	Nintendo
1- Intelligence Game Series	ABACUS	Magic Jewelry	Hwang Shinwei
1- Intelligence Game Series	UNDERWORLD	Devil World	Nintendo
2 - Sports & Adventures Game Series	UFO RACE	F1 Race	Nintendo
2 - Sports & Adventures Game Series	OBSTACLE RACE	Zippy Race	Irem
2 - Sports & Adventures Game Series	BASEBALL	Baseball	Nintendo
2 - Sports & Adventures Game Series	FUTURE COPTER	Battle City	Namco
2 - Sports & Adventures Game Series	DIAMOND	Diamond	Nice Code
2 - Sports & Adventures Game Series	TENNIS	Tennis	Nintendo
2 - Sports & Adventures Game Series	PLANETARY POOL	Lunar Pool	Pony Canyon
2 - Sports & Adventures Game Series	CLIMBING CLUB	Ice Climber	Nintendo
2 - Sports & Adventures Game Series	BIRD BRAIN	Bird Week	Toshiba EMI
2 - Sports & Adventures Game Series	NEED FOR SPEED	Spy Hunter	Sunsoft
2 - Sports & Adventures Game Series	BUMPITY BOP	Bump 'n' Jump	Data East
2 - Sports & Adventures Game Series	IN AND OUT RACER	Zippy Race	Irem
2 - Sports & Adventures Game Series	MONSTER DASH	Brush Roller	Hwang Shinwei
2 - Sports & Adventures Game Series	STREET FRENZY	City Connection	Jaleco
2 - Sports & Adventures Game Series	EXTREME RACER	Excitebike	Nintendo
2 - Sports & Adventures Game Series	CHAMPIONSHIP GOLF	Golf	Nintendo
2 - Sports & Adventures Game Series	CHAMPIONSHIP WRESTLING	M.U.S.C.L.E.	Bandai
2 - Sports & Adventures Game Series	JUNGLE TRAIL	Lode Runner	Hudson Soft
2 - Sports & Adventures Game Series	ARCTIC HUNT	Championship Lode Runner	Hudson Soft
2 - Sports & Adventures Game Series	AMERICAN FOOTBALL	10-Yard Fight	Irem
3 - Action Game Series	ARCHERY	Pooyan	Hudson Soft
3 - Action Game Series	ZERO GRAVITY	Balloon Fight	Nintendo
3 - Action Game Series	SUPER ELF	Circus Charlie	Konami
3 - Action Game Series	GOLD DIGGER	Super Arabian	Sunsoft
3 - Action Game Series	MARS MAN	Binary Land	Hudson Soft
3 - Action Game Series	MARS	Star Force	Hudson Soft
3 - Action Game Series	SPAR	Urban Champion	Nintendo
3 - Action Game Series	EGG IT	Pac-Man	Namco
3 - Action Game Series	HELICOPTER HARRY	Raid on Bungeling Bay	Hudson Soft
3 - Action Game Series	FLY BY	Exerion	Jaleco
3 - Action Game Series	SNACK ATTACK	Nuts & Milk	Hudson Soft
3 - Action Game Series	BOMB DROP	Chack'n Pop	Taito
3 - Action Game Series	DOWN DEEP	Dig Dug	Namco
3 - Action Game Series	PROPELLER	Sky Destroyer	Taito
3 - Action Game Series	NEIGHBORHOOD SMASH	Karateka	Soft Pro
3 - Action Game Series	ENEMY ASSAULT	Choujikuu Yousai Macross	Namco
3 - Action Game Series	FISH FIGHT	Clu Clu Land	Nintendo
3 - Action Game Series	WHAT'S UP	Donkey Kong	Nintendo
3 - Action Game Series	RESCUE	Donkey Kong Jr.	Nintendo
3 - Action Game Series	FROGLAND	Donkey Kong 3	Nintendo
3 - Action Game Series	JUMP AND JOURNEY	Mario Bros.	Nintendo
3 - Action Game Series	SAUCER WARS	Field Combat	Jaleco
3 - Action Game Series	DEPTHS OF SPACE	Defender II	HAL Laboratory
3 - Action Game Series	CONVERT SOLDIER	Formation Z	Jaleco
3 - Action Game Series	SWIRL	Millipede	HAL Laboratory
3 - Action Game Series	BREAK OUT	Mappy	Namco
3 - Action Game Series	SOARING WARRIOR	Joust	HAL Laboratory
3 - Action Game Series	LET LOOSE	Popeye	Nintendo
3 - Action Game Series	WARSHIP	Galaxian	Namco
3 - Action Game Series	VILLAGE PROTECTOR	Space Invaders	Taito
