= MLB Power Pros 2008 =

2008 video game

- US box art for Wii version
- Developer: Baseball Contents Production
- Publishers: 2K (North America); Konami (Japan)
- Series: Power Pros
- Engine: Power Pro Kun Pocket 10 engine (DS version)
- Platforms: PlayStation 2, Wii, Nintendo DS
- Release: PlayStation 2, Wii: NA: July 29, 2008; JP: October 2, 2008; Nintendo DS: NA: August 25, 2008
- Genre: Sports
- Modes: Single-player, multiplayer

MLB Power Pros 2008, also known in Japan as Jikkyou Pawapuro Major League 3 (実況パワフルメジャーリーグ3), is the sequel to MLB Power Pros. It is a baseball video game developed by Baseball Contents Production and published by 2K in North America and Konami in Japan for Nintendo's Wii and Sony's PlayStation 2 video game consoles, as well as the Nintendo DS handheld, and is part of the traditionally Japan-only Power Pros series of video games. The game was released in 2008 and published by 2K. The game retains the same look, feel, and gameplay as its predecessor, but features updated rosters, new modes (such as MLB Life), new features (in-game bullpen control), among others.

== MLB Life ==
The new mode in MLB Power Pros 2008 is about carrying on a career as a professional player (for the purposes of this section, "users" are those playing the video game, whereas "players" are the in-game characters); this player can be one of three things. First, the player may already be in the majors or triple A. Second, users can create a player and customize his skills. Third, users can use a created player from success mode; this player has made it to the major league level.

During a game, instead of pitching and batting the whole game, users will bat and run the bases as the individual player, and control other players on the bases (this requires the user to enable the option of manual base running). When the user plays as a pitcher, he or she will pitch only when the player is on the mound; fielding is computer-controlled.

When controlling a player, users will have a day planner every day. Most days there will be a period of time were users can choose what to do, called Free Time. Some would be hobbies like golf, driving, darts and reading. Another option is to rest, where players gain vitality and (in some cases) lower fatigue. There is also practice alone when users will work on skills. Finally, there is Chat option, where players can talk to fellow baseball players, agents, managers, ladies, and others.

After 20 years or if players are showing age and have put up the significant statistics, the player's time to retire will come. After notifying the manager, a retirement date will be set. Once the player has played that day, his career will come to an end. At that point, the player will have finished MLB Life on MLB Power Pros 2008.

== Cover ==
The cover features 8 then-MLB stars: Chien-Ming Wang, Magglio Ordóñez, Jimmy Rollins, Prince Fielder, Derrek Lee, Francisco Rodríguez, Takashi Saito, and Josh Beckett.

== Reception ==
Reception

Aggregate score
Aggregator	Score		
Aggregator	DS	PS2	Wii
Metacritic	70/100	67/100	79/100

Review scores
Publication	Score		
Publication	DS	PS2	Wii
Famitsu	N/A	31/40	31/40
GameRevolution	N/A	C−	C−
GameSpot	7/10	8/10	8/10
GamesRadar+	N/A	3/5	3/5
GameZone	7/10	N/A	7.7/10
IGN	7/10	8.4/10	8.4/10
Nintendo Power	N/A	N/A	7/10
PlayStation: The Official Magazine	N/A	2.5/5	N/A
X-Play	N/A	N/A	4/5
411Mania	N/A	N/A	8.2/10

The Wii version received "generally favorable reviews", while the DS and PlayStation 2 versions received "average" reviews, according to the review aggregation website Metacritic. In Japan, Famitsu gave the PS2 and Wii versions a score of three eights and one seven for a total of 31 out of 40.
