= 6 in 1 =

6 in 1 may refer to:

- The hexavalent vaccine (6-in-1)
- Caltron 6 in 1, NES multicart
- "Six in One", a 1944 anti-submarine patrol by the British ship HMS Kite
- "Six in One", jazz piece by Thelonious Monk
