= NTDEC =

Manufacturer of games and accessories

Nintendo Electronic Co. 任天堂電子有限公司
- Type: Private
- Industry: Video games
- Founded: 1983
- Defunct: 1993
- Fate: Sued by Nintendo of America
- Headquarters: Taipei, Taiwan

NTDEC, whose full name is Nintendo Electronic Co. (Chinese: 任天堂電子有限公司; pinyin: rèn tiān táng diàn zǐ yǒu xiàn gōng sī), was a Taiwanese manufacturer of cartridges, accessories and original games for NES and Famicom. For both they also manufactured converters to play Famicom titles on the NES. The company was founded in 1983 (according to the Asder official website), but in the 80's its activities were and are still today unknown.

NTDEC gained notoriety in the early 1990s for their large-scale piracy of Nintendo Entertainment System games along with their unauthorized use of the Nintendo trademark. This led to the arrest of a few of their employees and the discontinuation of the NTDEC line.

== History ==
=== Copyright infringement ===
NTDEC produced a large number of unlicensed video game copies between 1989 and 1991, which were sold in Asia and in the United States via mail order. Unusual among counterfeit cartridge manufacturers, they're often identifiable through the company logo on it and the in-game copyright notice modified to read "NTDEC", as well as the rear label featuring a green "QUALITY GUARANTY" [sic] stripe.

==== Nintendo of America, Inc. v. NTDEC ====
Two NTDEC employees were arrested in 1991 for the company's activities distributing cartridges in the US, and legal action was brought against the company by Nintendo shortly after for copyright infringement, as well as its use of the "Nintendo" trademark in its company name.

Nintendo's legal action of 1991 concluded in 1993 with Nintendo being awarded $24,059,062 plus attorneys fees of $108,829.00 and costs of $709.80, and a worldwide permanent injunction preventing NTDEC from infringing Nintendo's intellectual property rights. At this point the company ceased operations under the NTDEC name.

=== Original games ===
Between 1991 and 1993, NTDEC developed and published a number of original games in Asia, some of which were distributed in parts of South America and Europe. Many of these were credited to Mega Soft, a California-based company which was listed in Nintendo of America, Inc. v. NTDEC as their North American distribution arm. Six games previously released by them in 1991 were compiled on the Caltron 6 in 1 multicart in 1992, which was distributed in the United States - since this cartridge contains only NTDEC/Mega Soft games and carries the same CN-xx ID as the previous original NTDEC games; Caltron (or Caltron Ind. Inc.) is believed to be the same company as NTDEC.

==== List of titles as NTDEC ====
No.	Title	Original release	Notes
1	Pokey	1989	1) 4 minigames in 1: Bingo, Hi-Lo Poker, Puzzler, and Kentucky Derby. 2) All those minigames were later included separately in Asder 20-in-1, made in 1993 by Asder (NTDEC's successor).
2	Adam & Eve	1991	1) Game included later on Caltron 6 in 1 in 1992. 2) A clone of Balloon Fight.
3	Bookyman	1991	1) Game included later on Caltron 6 in 1 in 1992. 2) A hack of Hwang Shinwei's game Brush Roller.
4	Destroyer	1992	Similar to Star Force.
5	Go! Benny!	1992	
6	Super Gun	1992	
7	Tank	1992	Similar to Battle City.
8	Fighting Hero III	1993	
9	Master Shooter	1993	
10	Chik Bik Ji Jin - Saam Gwok Ji	Unknown	Also known as Three Kingdoms: Battle of Red Cliff (Sānguó Zhì - Chìbì Zhī Zhàn).

==== List of titles as Mega Soft ====
No.	Title	Original release	Notes
1	Balloon Monster	1991	1) Game included later on Caltron 6 in 1 in 1992. 2) A clone of Pang.
2	Cosmos Cop	1991	1) Game included later on Caltron 6 in 1 in 1992. 2) A clone of Space Harrier.
3	Fighting Hero	1991	Similar to Street Fighter.
4	Hit Marmot	1991	
5	Magic Block	1991	
6	Magic Carpet 1001	1991	1) Game included later on Caltron 6 in 1 in 1992. 2) Also known as Arabian Nights (Tiānfāng Yè Tán)
7	Porter	1991	1) Game included later on Caltron 6 in 1 in 1992. 2) A clone of Sokoban.
8	War in the Gulf	1991	
9	Sea of Dreamland	1992	

==== List of titles as Caltron ====
No.	Title	Original release	Notes
1	Caltron 6 in 1	1992	6 games in 1: Cosmos Cop, Magic Carpet 1001, Balloon Monster, Adam & Eve, Porter, and Bookyman.
2	Dream Fighter	1992	
3	Skate Boy	1992	

==== Unreleased titles ====
- Dragon Palace Adventure
- The Pearl Turn
- Caltron 9 in 1

== Asder ==
Asder Electronic Co., Ltd 亞斯德科技有限公司
- Type: Private
- Industry: Video games (1993–1994); Educational software
- Founded: 1993
- Headquarters: 3F-1, No. 22 SEC. 2 Keelung Road, Taipei, Taiwan, R.O.C.
- Key people: Kenny Hsu (Vice General Manager)
- Products: A.Smart and various children's electronics
- Website: http://www.asder.com/

Following the legal action of 1993, the company appears to have ceased operations under the NTDEC name. Another Taiwanese company, Asder Electronic Co., Ltd (Chinese: 亞斯德科技有限公司), has released educational computer systems and TV game joypads containing Mega Soft games, and several original Famicom games continuing NTDEC's CN-xx numbering. However, it's unknown whether this company is NTDEC with a new name, or a separate company that obtained the rights to past titles from them.

=== List of games ===
No.	Title	Original release	Notes
1	Asder 20-in-1	1993	A multi-cartridge containing: all Caltron 6 in 1 games, all Pokey minigames, four NTDEC/Mega Soft games, three exclusive Asder original games, and two exclusive hacks (Turbo Magic Carpet 1001 and Master Shooter).
2	Benico	1993	An original Asder game included only in Asder 20-in-1.
3	JP Ronny	1993	An original Asder game included only in Asder 20-in-1.
4	Top Hunter	1993	An original Asder game included only in Asder 20-in-1.
5	Cobra Mission	1994	
6	Zhēn Běn - Xīyóu Jì	1994	
7	Asder PC-95	1995	An Asder's PC dumped ROM containing: all Caltron 6 in 1 games, Hit Marmot by NTDEC/Mega Soft, and various educational games.
8	Huángdì	Unknown	Also known as Emperor: The War (Huángdì - Zhuō Lù Zhī Zhàn).
9	Sānguózhì: Qúnxióng Zhēngbà	Unknown	Also known as The Romance of Three Kingdoms: The Fight of Heroes' Pleiades.

Note: The title Master Shooter, included only in Asder 20-in-1, is the hack of the game of the same name (listed in the same compilation as Shooter: Part1).
