= Professional Baseball Spirits =

Professional Baseball Spirits Pro Yakyū Spirits
- Icon logo, from eBaseball: Pro Spirits
- Genres: Sports simulation (baseball); Life simulation Visual novel
- Developer: Baseball Contents Production
- Publisher: Konami
- Platforms: Android, iOS, Nintendo 3DS, Nintendo DS, Nintendo Switch, PlayStation 2, PlayStation 3, PlayStation 4, PlayStation 5, PlayStation Portable, PlayStation Vita, Xbox 360, Microsoft Windows
- First release: Pro Yakyū Spirits 2004; March 25, 2004
- Latest release: eBaseball:PRO SPIRIT 2026; July 16, 2026
- Parent series: Power Pros

Pro Yakyū Spirits (プロ野球スピリッツ, Puro Yakyū Supirittsu; lit. Professional Baseball Spirits), also known as Pro Baseball Spirits or just Pro Spirits (プロスピ, Puro Spi) is a Japanese baseball sports simulation game series, developed by Baseball Contents Production and published by Konami. It is a spin-off series of the Jikkyō Powerful Pro Yakyū (Power Pros) franchise.

While the main series Power Pros focuses on fast-paced but deep gameplay, the gameplay of Professional Baseball Spirits has a focus for realistic graphics and physics, similar to the Pro Evolution Soccer series. Just like Power Pros, most games in the series are developed under license from the Nippon Professional Baseball (NPB) and the Japan Professional Baseball Players Association (JPBPA), letting them use the league's team names, stadiums, colors, and players' names and likenesses. Also, a version of Professional Baseball Spirits featuring Major League Baseball players was released under the title eBaseball: MLB PRO SPIRIT on October 23, 2024.

== Games ==
Professional Yakyuu Spirits 2004 Pro Yakyū Spirits 2004
- Platform: PlayStation 2
- Release: JP: March 25, 2004
- Genres: Sports, simulation
- Modes: Single-player, multiplayer

Professional Baseball Spirits 2 Pro Yakyū Spirits 2
- Platform: PlayStation 2
- Release: JP: April 7, 2005
- Genres: Sports, simulation
- Modes: Single-player, multiplayer

Professional Baseball Spirits 2 (プロ野球スピリッツ2, Pro Yakyū Spirits 2) is a baseball simulation video game developed by Konami for the PlayStation 2 that was released on April 7, 2005.

=== Pro Yakyū Spirits 3 ===
Professional Baseball Spirits3 Pro Yakyū Spirits 3
- Platforms: Xbox 360, PlayStation 2
- Release: JP: April 6, 2006
- Genres: Sports, simulation
- Modes: Single-player, multiplayer

Professional Baseball Spirits 3 (プロ野球スピリッツ3, Pro Yakyū Spirits 3) is a baseball simulation game designed for the Xbox 360 and PlayStation 2 systems. The game was released on April 6, 2006, and is developed and published by Konami.

=== Pro Yakyū Spirits 4 ===
Professional Baseball Spirits 4 Pro Yakyū Spirits 4
- Series: Pro Yakyū Spirits
- Platforms: PlayStation 3, PlayStation 2
- Release: JP: May 1, 2007
- Genre: Baseball

Professional Baseball Spirits 4 (プロ野球スピリッツ4, Pro Yakyū Spirits 4) is a baseball video game published by Konami for the PlayStation 2 and PlayStation 3 in Japan on May 1, 2007. It is the sequel of Pro Yakyū Spirits 3.

==== Gameplay overview ====
The game features all 12 Nippon Professional Baseball teams, and both the Pacific League and Central League All-Star teams (circa 2006, but with changes made for traded and/or retired players).

The difficulty level for the game is adjustable. The easiest mode will appeal to younger players who have probably never played a baseball game before in their lives, and the hardest mode—known as Spirits Mode—will give even the most experienced and advanced players a challenge with superior AI. Other modes can be selected in a sort of pseudo-gameplay sliders mode. For instance, gameplay speed can be increased, as well as pitch speed (which can be set to "real" speed).

The basic batting interface is a silhouette of a bat which influences how the ball will travel. Depending on when and where contact was made, that influences where the ball goes. The pitching is a 2-click system where the player selects his pitch around a grid, presses X to start his delivery, then pressing X as one circle converges on another to try and perfectly time the pitch.

==== Reception ====
Around the time of its release, it was the only PlayStation 3 video game that was among the top 50 best-selling video games in Japan.

=== Pro Yakyū Spirits 5 ===
Professional Baseball Spirits 5 Pro Yakyū Spirits 5
- Platforms: PlayStation 3, PlayStation 2
- Release: JP: April 1, 2008
- Genre: Sports
- Modes: Single-player, multiplayer

Professional Baseball Spirits 5 (プロ野球スピリッツ5, Pro Yakyū Spirits 5) is a baseball video game published by Konami for the PlayStation 2 and PlayStation 3 in Japan on May 1, 2008. It is the sequel to Professional Baseball Spirits 4.

==== Improvements and additions ====
On the PlayStation 3 version of Pro Yakyū Spirits 5, the game saw many small improvements. The graphics were enhanced further from the previous incarnation, but the major fixes were in the gameplay. The load times that plagued the previous game were fixed, meaning less of the "black screens" that were used for short load times in PYS4. The game also has more of a television-style presentation, new animations for slap hits, and a new meter that tells players what pitch the CPU batter is expecting.

The new mode in PYS5 which replaces the MVP Mode in the previous game is Stardom Mode. It plays like a full-fledged Career Mode, where a player can either take control of an existing player or create their own player to go through a maximum of 20 years of play. Experience points are distributed on how well the player does in his at-bat.

==== Pro Yakyū Spirits 5 Kanzenban ====
An updated version of the game with the subtitle Kanzenban, which means Perfect Version, was released in December 2008. Released on both the PlayStation 2 and PlayStation 3, Kanzenban touted many improvements over the original as a post-season version of the game. For instance, every player who appeared in a game in the 2008 NPB season for all 12 teams was included on each team's roster, there were new player animations, enhanced artificial intelligence, and also small improvements to graphics (foreign players, for example, no longer look generic and have their actual swings), online play, baserunning, and fielding.

Kanzenban marked the first time since Pro Yakyu Spirits 2004 Climax that a PYS game had been re-made for a post-season version, similar to that of the "Ketteiban" games in Pro Yakyu Spirits sister series, Jikkyou Powerful Pro Yakyuu.

=== Pro Yakyū Spirits 6 ===
Professional Baseball Spirits 6 Pro Yakyū Spirits 6
- Platforms: PlayStation 2, PlayStation 3
- Release: JP: July 16, 2009
- Genres: Sports, simulation
- Modes: Single-player, multiplayer

Professional Baseball Spirits 6 (プロ野球スピリッツ6, Pro Yakyū Spirits 6) is a baseball simulation video game developed by Konami and PawaPuro Productions for the PlayStation 2 and PlayStation 3 that was released on July 16, 2009.

==== New features ====
The new major mode in the game for this season is the World Baseball Classic mode. Upon booting the game, the first menu is to decide whether the player wants to play the WBC mode or the regular Pro Yakyuu Spirits game. The rosters are accurate for all WBC teams, and is possible to play an entire tournament as any of the 16 teams.

=== Pro Yakyū Spirits 2010 ===
Professional Baseball Spirits 2010 Pro Yakyuu Spirits 2010
- Platforms: PlayStation 2, PlayStation 3, PlayStation Portable
- Release: JP: April 1, 2010
- Genres: Sports, simulation
- Modes: Single-player, multiplayer

Professional Baseball Spirits 2010 (プロ野球スピリッツ2010, Pro Yakyū Spirits 2010) is a baseball simulation video game developed by Konami and PawaPuro Productions for the PlayStation 2, PlayStation 3 and PlayStation Portable that was released on April 1, 2010.

=== Pro Yakyū Spirits 2011 ===
Professional Baseball Spirits 2011 Pro Yakyuu Spirits 2011
- Platforms: PlayStation 3, PlayStation Portable, Nintendo 3DS
- Release: JP: April 14, 2011
- Genres: Sports, simulation
- Modes: Single-player, multiplayer

Professional Baseball Spirits 2011 (プロ野球スピリッツ2011, Pro Yakyū Spirits 2011) is a baseball simulation video game developed by Konami and PawaPuro Productions for the PlayStation 3, PlayStation Portable and Nintendo 3DS that was released on April 14, 2011.

=== Pro Yakyū Spirits 2012 ===
Professional Baseball Spirits 2012 Pro Yakyuu Spirits 2012
- Platforms: PlayStation 3, PlayStation Portable, PlayStation Vita
- Release: JP: March 29, 2012
- Genres: Sports, simulation
- Modes: Single-player, multiplayer

Professional Baseball Spirits 2012 (プロ野球スピリッツ2012, Pro Yakyū Spirits 2012) is a baseball simulation video game developed by Konami Digital Entertainment and PawaPuro Productions for the PlayStation Portable, PlayStation Vita and PlayStation 3 that was released on March 29, 2012.

==== Resume ====
The previous version was released on the 3DS, but publishers have decided to give preference to PlayStation Vita.

The release date is the same for all platforms and was timed for the start of a new baseball season.

==== New features and updates ====
- The game has a completely redesigned graphics and the display changes were made to account for the display and the player's name.
- Roster could be online updated in the PlayStation Vita version.
- A new commentator for this version is Tsutomu Ito.

=== Pro Yakyū Spirits 2013 ===
Professional Baseball Spirits 2013 Pro Yakyuu Spirits 2013
- Platforms: PlayStation 3, PlayStation Portable, PlayStation Vita
- Release: JP: March 20, 2013
- Genres: Sports, simulation
- Modes: Single-player, multiplayer

Professional Baseball Spirits 2013 (プロ野球スピリッツ2013, Pro Yakyū Spirits 2013) is a baseball simulation video game developed by Konami and PawaPuro Productions for the PlayStation 3, PlayStation Portable and PlayStation Vita that was released on March 20, 2013.

=== Pro Yakyū Spirits 2014 ===
Professional Baseball Spirits 2014 Pro Yakyuu Spirits 2014
- Platforms: PlayStation 3, PlayStation Portable, PlayStation Vita
- Release: JP: March 20, 2014
- Genres: Sports, simulation
- Modes: Single-player, multiplayer

Professional Baseball Spirits 2014 (プロ野球スピリッツ2014, Pro Yakyū Spirits 2014) is a baseball simulation video game developed by Konami and PawaPuro Productions for the PlayStation 3, PlayStation Portable and PlayStation Vita that was released on March 20, 2014.

=== Pro Yakyū Spirits 2015 ===
Professional Baseball Spirits 2015 Pro Yakyuu Spirits 2015
- Platforms: PlayStation 3, PlayStation Vita
- Release: JP: March 26, 2015
- Genres: Sports, simulation
- Modes: Single-player, multiplayer

Professional Baseball Spirits 2015 (プロ野球スピリッツ2015, Pro Yakyū Spirits 2015) is a baseball simulation video game developed by Konami and PawaPuro Productions for the PlayStation 3 and PlayStation Vita that was released on March 26, 2015.

Professional Baseball Spirits A Pro Yakyū Spirits A
- Platforms: iOS, Android
- Release: JP: October 21, 2015

=== Pro Yakyū Spirits A ===
Professional Baseball Spirits A (プロ野球スピリッツA, Pro Yakyū Spirits Ace), also known as Pro Spirits A (プロスピA, Puro Spi A) is a mobile baseball video game developed by Konami and PawaPuro Productions for iOS and Android that was released on October 21, 2015. As of September 2024, the game has been downloaded 56 million times.

Professional Baseball Spirits 2019 Pro Yakyuu Spirits 2019
- Platforms: PlayStation 4, PlayStation Vita
- Release: JP: July 18, 2019
- Genres: Sports, simulation
- Modes: Single-player, multiplayer

Konami collaborated with the snack company Calbee to sell baseball card collectibles based on the game, which was sold for a limited time in January 2025.

=== Pro Yakyū Spirits 2019 ===
Professional Baseball Spirits 2019 (プロ野球スピリッツ2019, Pro Yakyū Spirits 2019) is a baseball simulation video game developed by Konami and PawaPuro Productions for the PlayStation 4 and PlayStation Vita that was released on July 18, 2019.

=== eBaseball Pro Yakyuu Spirits 2021: Grand Slam ===
eBaseball Professional Baseball Spirits 2021: Grand Slam eBaseball Pro Yakyuu Spirits 2021: Grand Slam
- Platform: Nintendo Switch
- Release: JP: July 8, 2021
- Genres: Sports, simulation
- Modes: Single-player, multiplayer

eBaseball Professional Baseball Spirits 2021: Grand Slam (eBaseball プロ野球スピリッツ2021, eBaseball Pro Yakyū Spirits 2021) is a baseball simulation video game developed by Konami and PawaPuro Productions for the Nintendo Switch that was released on July 8, 2021. This is the first mainline game that uses the title eBaseball and the only one made for the Nintendo Switch.

Professional Baseball Spirits 2024/2025 Pro Yakyuu Spirits 2024/2025
- Engine: eBaseball Engine (based on Unreal Engine 5)
- Platforms: PlayStation 5, Microsoft Windows
- Release: JP: September 19, 2024
- Genres: Sports, simulation
- Modes: Single-player, multiplayer

=== Pro Yakyuu Spirits 2024 - 2025 ===
Professional Baseball Spirits 2024 - 2025 (プロ野球スピリッツ2024 - 2025, Pro Yakyū Spirits 2024 - 2025) is a baseball simulation video game developed by Konami and PawaPuro Productions for the PlayStation 5 and Microsoft Windows that was released on September 19, 2024. The game was released in celebration of the series' 20th anniversary and 30th anniversary of Power Pros series, with Shohei Ohtani as the ambassador. It is also the first time in the series that the game title is written in two-year increments. This is the first mainline game that made for a Microsoft's product since Pro Yakyū Spirits 3 for Xbox 360.

Although this was the only game of the series that no longer use the brand name eBaseball for the game title, the brand name eBaseball was used as the name of a new game engine for the ninth generation of video game consoles based on Unreal Engine 5, called as eBaseball Engine.

=== eBaseball: MLB PRO SPIRIT ===
eBaseball: MLB PRO SPIRIT
- Platforms: iOS, Android
- Release: WW: October 23, 2024

eBaseball: MLB PRO SPIRIT is the first game of the series featuring Major League Baseball, featuring all the 30 stadiums and players of 2024 season and featuring the National League MVP Shohei Ohtani as the cover athlete. It was also as the first game of the series that released worldwide.

The gameplay is largely based on Professional Baseball Spirits A, where the players need to collect virtual cards and build own team in various modes.

=== eBaseball: PRO SPIRIT ===
eBaseball: PRO SPIRIT
- Engine: eBaseball Engine (based on Unreal Engine 5)
- Platforms: PlayStation 5, Microsoft Windows
- Release: WW: March 5, 2026
- Genres: Sports, simulation
- Modes: Single-player, multiplayer

eBaseball: PRO SPIRIT is a baseball simulation video game developed by Konami and PawaPuro Productions for the PlayStation 5 and Microsoft Windows that was released in March 2026. It was also as the second game of the series that released worldwide.

The gameplay is largely based on its predecessor Professional Baseball Spirits 2024 - 2025. But unlike its predecessor, the game was designed as a free-to-play digital video game, but unlike eFootball it does not include microtransactions.

It also acts as a free demo for eBaseball: PRO SPIRIT 2026.

eBaseball: PRO SPIRIT 2026 Pro Yakyū Spirits 2026
- Engine: eBaseball Engine (based on Unreal Engine 5)
- Platforms: PlayStation 5, Microsoft Windows
- Release: WW: July 16, 2026
- Genres: Sports, simulation
- Modes: Single-player, multiplayer

=== eBaseball: PRO SPIRIT 2026 ===
Pro Spirits 2026 (プロ野球スピリッツ2026, Pro Yakyū Spirits 2026) is a baseball simulation video game developed by Konami and PawaPuro Productions for the PlayStation 5 and Microsoft Windows that was released in July 2026. It is also the first game of the series released worldwide that features the Nippon Professional Baseball licence.

It is also the first game since 2009 that features the World Baseball Classic licence, although, due to MLB:The Show 26 holding the licensing of the WBC, the WBC mode was launched exclusively in Japan and Asian markets only. This is the second mainline game that uses the title eBaseball since eBaseball Professional Baseball Spirits 2021: Grand Slam.

== See also ==
- Power Pros
- Kōshien video game series
