= Magical Company =

Japanese video game company

Magical Company ltd. 魔法株式会社
- Industry: Media, video games
- Founded: May 29, 1985
- Headquarters: Chūō-ku, Kobe
- Products: Fatal Fury: King of Fighters (X68000); Kōshien (series); Magical Sports series
- Website: http://www.mahou.co.jp/

Magical Company ltd. (魔法株式会社), also known as Mahō, is a Japanese entertainment company.

== History ==
Established in Kobe in 1983 to design and develop video games, the company was incorporated on May 29, 1985 as Home Data. During the 80s they developed and published various mahjong games for the Arcades.

They developed Last Apostle Puppet Show (known in Japan as Reikai Dōshi: Chinese Exorcist), released in 1988. It was the first fighting game to use digitized sprites and motion capture animation, and was the first claymation fighting game. They also created Battlecry among many other titles for different console systems.

In 1993, in order to mark the tenth anniversary of Home Data's establishment, the company's name was changed to Magical Company. They ported three Garou Densetsu titles for the X68000, and are also well known in Japan for having published many Shogi titles.

The baseball series Kōshien is their most notable franchise.

== Video games ==
=== Home Data ===
- Penguin-Kun Wars, Family Computer (1985)
- Sky Destroyer, Family Computer (1985)
- Sqoon, Family Computer (1986)
- Tetsuwan Atom, Family Computer (1988)
- Reikai Doushi: Chinese Exorcist (Last Apostle Puppet Show), Arcade (1988)
- BattleCry, Arcade (1989)
- Hayauchi Super Igo, Family Computer (1989)
- Cosmic Epsilon, Family Computer (1989)
- World Super Tennis, Family Computer/NES (1989)
- Shogi Shodan Icchokusen, PC Engine (1990)
- Marble Madness, X68000 (1991)
- 2069 A.D., X68000 (1991)
- Mahjong Clinic Zoukangou, X68000 (1991)
- Mahjong Yuuenchi, X68000 (1991)
- Famicom Shogi: Ryuu-Ou-Sen, Family Computer (1991)
- Tetra Star: The Fighter, Family Computer (1991)
- Shogi no Hoshi, Mega Drive (1991)
- Dragon's Eye Plus: Shanghai 3 (Shanghai II: Dragon's Eye), Mega Drive/Genesis (1991/1994)
- Shogi Shoshinsha Muyou, PC Engine (1991)
- Famicom Igo Nyuumon, Family Computer (1991)
- Shogi Seiten, X68000 (1992)
- Hermetica, Arcade (unreleased)

=== Magical Company ===
- Garou Densetsu, X68000 (1993)
- Garou Densetsu 2: Aratanaru Tatakai, X68000 (1993)
- Garou Densetsu Special, X68000 (1994)
- Shogi Saikyō, Game Boy (1994), Super Famicom (1995)
- Harapeko Bakka (known in Europe as Hungry Dinosaurs), Super Famicom (1994)
- Nice de Shot, Super Famicom (1994)
- Pachi-Slot Kenkyū, Super Famicom (1994)
- Tsume Shogi: Kanki Godan, Game Boy (1994)
- Tsume Go Series 1: Fujisawa Hideyuki Meiyo Kisei, Game Boy (1994)
- Zenkoku Kōkō Soccer Senshuken '96, Super Famicom (1996)
- Shogi Saikyō II: Jissen Taikyoku Hen, Super Famicom (1996)
- Hanabi Fantast, PlayStation (1998)
- Shogi Saikyou 2, PlayStation (1998)
- Qui Qui, Game Boy Color (1999)
- Shogi Saikyō: Pro ni Manabu, PlayStation (1999)
- Pet Pet Pet, PlayStation (1999)
- Killer Bass, PlayStation (2000)
- Omiai Commando: Bakappuru ni Tukkomi o, PlayStation (2000)
- Ooedo Huusui Ingaritsu Hanabi 2, PlayStation (2000)
- Magical Sports Go Go Golf, PlayStation 2 (2000)
- Hard Hitter Tennis, PlayStation 2 (2001)
- Magical Sports: Hard Hitter 2, PlayStation 2 (2002)
- Hanabi Shokunin Ninarou 2, PlayStation 2 (2003)
- Kōshien (series), various consoles

== See also ==
- List of fighting game companies
- List of shogi video games
