= Top Players' Tennis =

1989 video game

- North American cover art featuring Chris Evert and Ivan Lendl
- Developer(s): Home Data
- Publisher(s): JP/NA: Asmik; EU: Nintendo
- Platform(s): Nintendo Entertainment System
- Release: JP: October 13, 1989; NA: January 1990; EU: July 1992
- Genre(s): Sports
- Mode(s): Single player, multiplayer

Top Players' Tennis (called World Super Tennis (ワールドスーパーテニス, Wārudo Sūpā Tenisu) in Japan and Four Players' Tennis in Europe) is a tennis video game developed by Home Data for the Nintendo Entertainment System. It was released in Japan in 1989 and North America in 1990 by Asmik and Europe in 1992 by Nintendo.

The game cover prominently features tennis champions Chris Evert and Ivan Lendl, both of whom are former number 1 ranked singles players.

== Gameplay ==
In single-player mode, the player may compete in the four Grand Slams: the Australian Open, the French Open, Wimbledon, and the US Open. To compete in the Grand Slams, the player must first win the qualifying tournament, the Asmik Open.

With a multiplayer console accessory such as the NES Satellite or NES Four Score, Top Players' Tennis accommodates up to four simultaneous players. Singles, doubles, or mixed doubles are all available for play.

== See also ==
- Tennis (1984)
- Jimmy Connors Tennis (1993)
- List of Nintendo Entertainment System games
