= Jewelbox (video game) =

1992 video game

- Publisher(s): Varcon Systems
- Platform(s): Mac
- Genre(s): Puzzle

Jewelbox is a puzzle video game developed by Varcon Systems for the Macintosh. It is a clone of Sega's Columns.

== Gameplay ==
Jewel Box is a game in which the player moves colored gems that fall from the top of the screen, which disappear when they form patterns, and the round ends when the playing area becomes filled with gems; special gems cause different things to happen. The player must manipulate the jewels to form lines of three or more horizontally, vertically or diagonally. Jewels are affected by gravity, allowing the player to set up chain reactions which multiply the value of the gems matched. When the playing area is filled, it is cleared and the player loses one life - unlike Tetris, the player is given three lives in each game, and the opportunity to earn additional lives by reaching points milestones. Gems are worth different numbers of points, with black onyx-like stones being the most valuable.

The game includes an easter egg where matching three black jewels on the bottom row of the play area resulted in a huge points bonus.

== Development ==
Jewelbox was originally published as shareware, in 1992, and was developed by Rodney and Brenda Jacks, with music by Jim Holt. After its initial release, Jewelbox was published as a commercial game by Varcon Systems. The commercial version added many new features including support for different display sizes and more powerups including the ability to collect and play wildcard jewels whenever the player wanted. Varcon sold the game individually and as part of a package of three arcade game challenges.

== Reception ==
The game was reviewed in 1994 in Dragon #211 by Jay & Dee in the "Eye of the Monitor" column. Jay did not rate the game, but Dee gave the game 3½ out of 5 stars. Dee noted that the gameplay is vaguely similar to that of Tetris, but that "Jewelbox is not just a clone—it has intriguing rules all its own, including special gems that cause amazing things to happen, and beautiful sound and graphics".

Laurel Clyde, in the book Managing Infotech in School Library Media Centers mentions Jewelbox as one of the games "that pay homage to Tetris while extending the concept in new directions".

Larry Hanson, in his book Everything You Wanted to Know About the Mac, said that Jewelbox "deserves special praise, not only for its nice graphics and music, but also for its packaging. Instead of the shelf-hogging cardboard boxes most games come packed in, Jewelbox (like Varcon's other games) comes in a re-useable suede bag".
