= Coloris =

1990 video game

- Developer(s): Signum Victoriae
- Publisher(s): Avesoft
- Designer(s): Pertti Lehtinen; Keijo Heljanko
- Artist(s): Harri Granholm
- Composer(s): Tor Bernhard Gausen; Jean-Pierre Jandrain
- Platform(s): Amiga
- Release: 1990
- Genre(s): Puzzle
- Mode(s): Single-player

Coloris is a puzzle video game released in 1990 for the Amiga. It was published by Avesoft, a distributor of freeware and shareware disks. Coloris is similar to Sega's Columns, which itself is a variant of Tetris.

A port to the Atari ST was only released as a preview; the full version was not published.

== Gameplay ==
Blocks fall from top of the screen to a well. The blocks consist of three squares of different colours. The blocks cannot be rotated, but the order of the colours can be switched. If three or more squares of same colour are adjacent, they disappear, blocks above them fall down, and may trigger a chain reaction.

== Reception ==
Jukka Tapanimäki wrote a glowing review for MikroBitti magazine.
