= NES Four Score and Satellite =

Video game console multiplayer peripherals

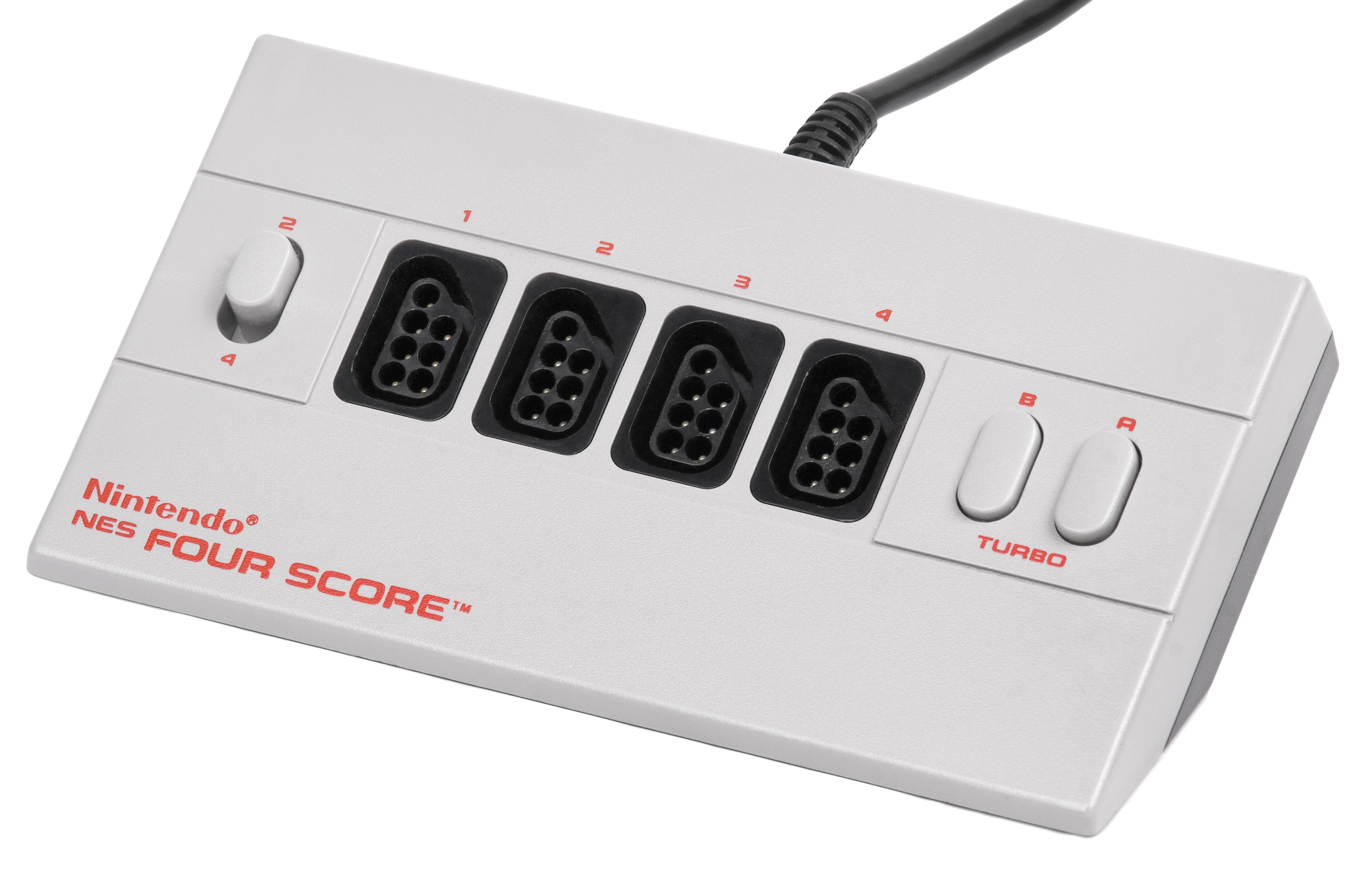
NES Four Score

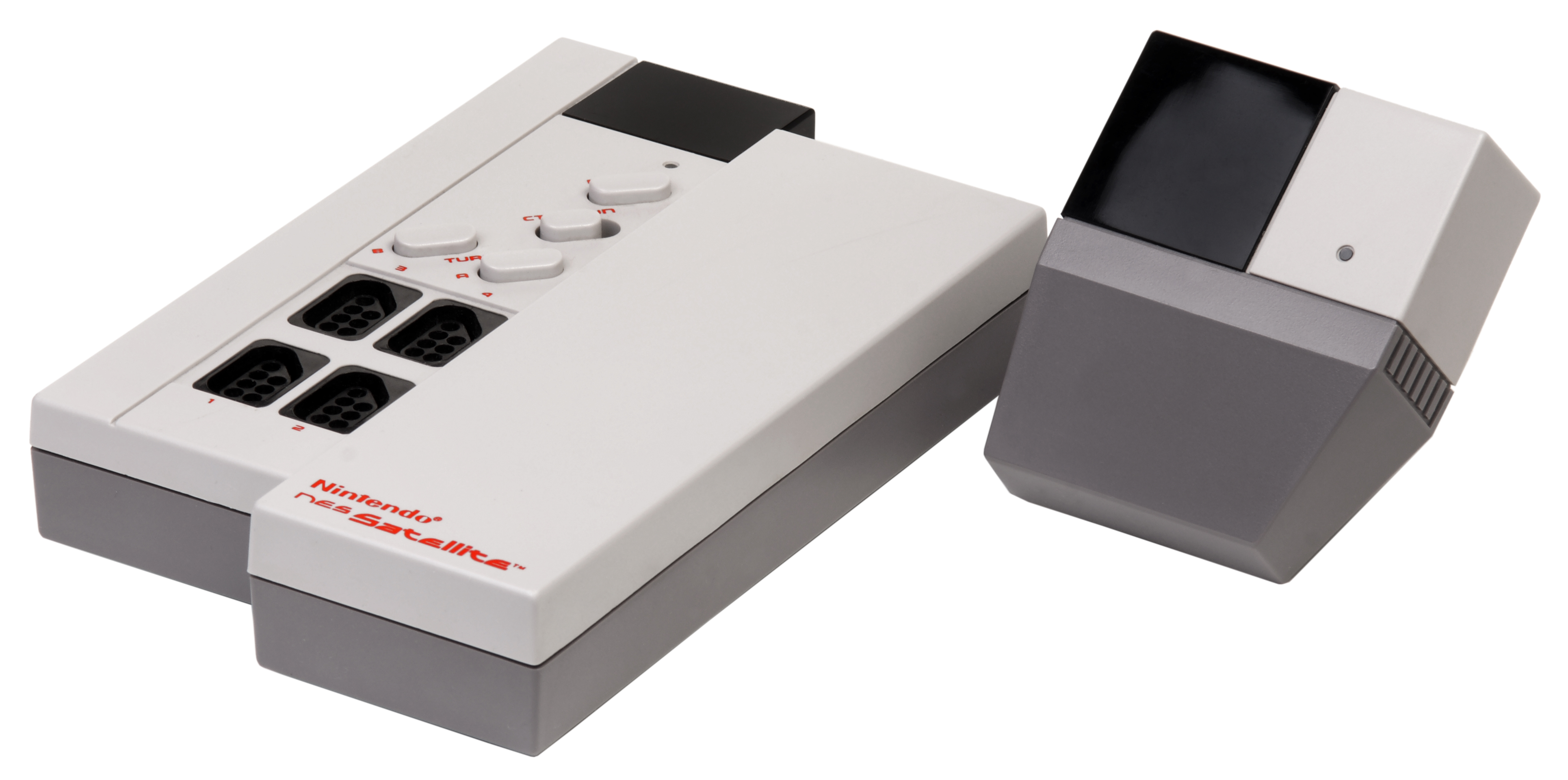
NES Satellite

The NES Four Score and NES Satellite are multitap accessories produced by Nintendo for the Nintendo Entertainment System (NES). With supported games, both peripherals allow the connection of up to four controllers to input simultaneously on the NES; they are interchangeable in their compatibility with supported games.

The major difference between the NES Four Score and the NES Satellite is that the former connects directly to the NES, while the latter uses infrared wireless communication instead; the latter acts as a range extender adaptor for all wired controllers, extending the usable range from around 3 feet (for a standard controller) to 15 feet. The Satellite consists of two units: a small infrared receiver that plugs into the console's controller ports, and a main unit that is powered by six C batteries and must have a line of sight to the receiver. Both devices have four controller ports and two "Turbo" switches to simulate rapid pressing of the A and B buttons. The NES Satellite includes a switch to enable either a controller or light gun (NES Zapper) mode; the NES Four Score does not have such a switch and is incompatible with the latter peripheral as well as the Power Pad, but includes a different switch that enables either a two-controller or four-controller mode.

NES games released prior to the introduction of the multitaps required the sharing of an NES controller if they supported more than two players (such as Anticipation); such games do not support the multitaps' individual controller feature as a result. Both devices were shown at the 1990 Winter Consumer Electronics Show.

Nintendo initially revealed the NES Satellite, designed by Rare Coin-It, to journalists in June 1989; it was previewed in the September–October 1989 issue of Nintendo Power before releasing in North America in December 1989 at an MSRP of US$39.95 and was also featured in the NES Sports Set console bundle, which retailed for $150. The adapter was released in Sweden in February 1991 for 525 kr. The NES Four Score was released in North America in March 1990 for US$24.95.

== Games ==
These licensed games are compatible with the NES Four Score for more than two concurrent controllers: (Note: Game compatibility with the NES Four Score extends to the NES Satellite since they are interchangeable with each other.)

- Bomberman II (up to three players)
- Championship Bowling
- Danny Sullivan's Indy Heat
- Gauntlet II
- Greg Norman's Golf Power
- Harlem Globetrotters
- Kings of the Beach
- Magic Johnson's Fast Break
- Monster Truck Rally
- M.U.L.E.
- NES Play Action Football
- A Nightmare on Elm Street
- Nintendo World Cup
- Rackets & Rivals
- R.C. Pro-Am II
- Roundball: 2 on 2 Challenge
- Smash TV (two players with two controllers each)
- Spot: The Video Game
- Super Jeopardy!
- Super Off Road
- Super Spike V'Ball
- Swords and Serpents
- Top Players' Tennis

These homebrew games are also compatible:

- Justice Duel
- Micro Mages

These cancelled games were planned to support the devices:

- Hit the Ice

== Famicom counterparts ==
Since the Famicom has hardwired controllers, all games supporting more than two controllers require the use of a controller or peripheral that plugs into the console's expansion port. Some titles (such as Nekketsu Kakutō Densetsu and Nekketsu Kōkō Dodgeball Bu) require separate controllers to connect to it, while others (such as Downtown Nekketsu Kōshinkyoku: Soreyuke Daiundōkai and Wit's) require the Four Players Adapter, a multitap manufactured by Hori Electric.

== See also ==
- Multitap
- List of Nintendo Entertainment System accessories
