= Hard Hitter Tennis =

2002 video game

- North American cover art
- Developer: Magical Company
- Publishers: JP: Magical Company; NA: Atlus USA; EU: Midas Interactive Entertainment
- Platform: PlayStation 2
- Release: JP: February 7, 2002; NA: November 8, 2002; EU: February 14, 2003
- Genre: Sports (tennis)
- Modes: Single-player; Multiplayer

Hard Hitter Tennis, known in Japan as Magical Sports: Hard Hitter 2 (マジカルスポーツ Hard Hitter 2, Majikaru Supōtsu Hādo Hitā Tsū) and in Europe as Hard Hitter 2, is a tennis video game created by Japanese developer Magical Company Ltd, released in 2002. It's the sequel to the 2001 video game Magical Sports: Hard Hitter (known in Europe as Centre Court: Hard Hitter), which never got a North American release.

== Reception ==
Reception

Aggregate score
Aggregator	Score
Metacritic	56/100

Review scores
Publication	Score
Famitsu	26/40
GameSpy	1/5
IGN	4/10

The game received "mixed" reviews according to the review aggregation website Metacritic. In Japan, Famitsu gave it a score of 26 out of 40.
