= Columns (video game) =

1989 video game

- European Mega Drive box art
- Developer: Jay Geertsen
- Publishers: Sega (arcade and Sega consoles)
- Designer: Jay Geertsen
- Composer: Tokuhiko Uwabo (Genesis)
- Series: Columns
- Platform: List: HP-UX, Mac OS, MS-DOS, arcade, Genesis/Mega Drive, Master System, Sega CD, Game Gear, Atari ST, PC Engine, FM Towns, PC-8801, PC-9801, X68000, MSX2, Super Famicom, Game Boy Color, iOS, ZX Spectrum
- Release: 1989: HP-UX, Mac OS, MS-DOS; 1989 Arcade; JP: March 1990; NA: June 1990; EU: August 1990 Genesis/Mega Drive; JP: June 30, 1990; NA: September 1990; EU: 1990 Game Gear; JP: October 6, 1990; NA: April 26, 1991; EU: June 1991 MSX2; JP: December 25, 1990 PC Engine; JP: March 29, 1991 X68000; JP: October 16, 1991 Super Famicom; JP: August 1, 1999
- Genre: Puzzle
- Modes: Single-player, multiplayer
- Arcade system: Sega System C

Columns (Japanese: コラムス, Hepburn: Koramusu) is a match-three puzzle video game designed and developed by Jay Geertsen and shared in 1989. Originally developed for the Motorola 68000-based HP 9000 running HP-UX, it was ported to Mac and MS-DOS before being released commercially by Sega, who ported it to arcades and then to several Sega consoles. The game was subsequently ported to other home computers, including the Atari ST.

== Gameplay ==
The game uses a tall, rectangular playing area. Columns of three different symbols (such as differently-colored jewels) appear, one at a time, at the top of the well and fall to the bottom, landing either on the floor or on top of previously fallen "columns". While a column is falling, the player can move it left and right, and can also cycle the positions of the symbols within it. After a column lands, if three or more of the same symbols are connected in a horizontal, vertical, or diagonal line, those symbols disappear. The pile of columns then settles under gravity. If this resettlement causes three or more other symbols to align, they too disappear and the cycle repeats. Occasionally, a special column with a multicolor Magic Jewel appears. It destroys all the jewels with the same color as the one underneath it. The columns fall at a faster rate as the player progresses. The goal of the game is to play for as long as possible before the well fills up with jewels, which ends the game. Players can score up to 99,999,999 points.

Some ports of the game offer alternate game modes as well. "Flash columns" involves mining through a set number of lines to get to a flashing jewel at the bottom. "Doubles" allows two players to work together in the same well. "Time trial" involves racking up as many points as possible within the time limit.

== Development ==
Columns is one of the many tile-matching puzzle games to appear after the great success of Tetris in the late 1980s. It was created in 1989 by Jay Geertsen, a software engineer at Hewlett-Packard (HP), as a personal project to learn X11 programming on the HP-UX operating system. After completing the game, Geertsen shared it with colleagues at HP. Two of them ported Columns to Macintosh and MS-DOS.

As these ports gained popularity, Sega became aware of Columns and expressed interest in acquiring the commercial rights to the game. Geertsen informed HP of the situation, given that he had utilized corporate resources during the game's development. HP took approximately six months to deliberate on the request, ultimately deciding to sell non-exclusive rights to Sega, and donating the proceeds to the United Way. HP retained the rights to distribute Geertsen's original X11 version of Columns alongside HP-UX.

== Music ==
Tokuhiko Uwabo composed the music for the Genesis version of Columns. The tracks "Clotho", "Atropos" and "Lathesis" are named after the Moirai from Greek mythology.

== Ports ==
In 1990, Sega ported Columns to the arcade, and then to the Sega Genesis. These two versions were nearly identical.

Columns was the first pack-in game for the Game Gear. In the United Kingdom, the Game Gear initially launched for £99.99 without a bundled game; later packages included either Columns or Super Monaco GP at the same price. This version was slightly different from the Genesis version, and its soundtrack was transposed and rearranged due to limitations of the handheld's sound chip. While the columns themselves were updated for the Genesis version, the overall decoration was less like a cartoon in the Game Gear version and instead more artistically designed. Lastly, the Game Gear version had a feature that let the player change the jewels to fruit, squares, dice, or playing card suits (clubs, diamonds, spades, and hearts).

In 1990, Compile and Telenet Japan developed and published an MSX2 version.

In November 2006, Columns was released as part of the game Sega Genesis Collection for the PlayStation 2, and later for PlayStation Portable. The same year on December 4, it was released on Nintendo's Virtual Console for Wii. It is also included on Sonic's Ultimate Genesis Collection for the PlayStation 3 and Xbox 360. It was included as one of the games in the Sega Genesis Mini. It was also included as one of the games in the 2018 releases of Sega Genesis Classics for Windows, Linux, macOS, PlayStation 4, Xbox One, and Nintendo Switch. Most recently, the game was ported to iOS, but the port was subsequently withdrawn by Sega. The Genesis version was re-released on the Nintendo Classics service in December 2022.

== Reception ==
Reception

Aggregate score
Aggregator	Score				
Aggregator	Arcade	Game Gear	Master System	Sega Genesis	TurboGrafx-16
GameRankings				56.3% (retrospective)	

Review scores
Publication	Score				
Publication	Arcade	Game Gear	Master System	Sega Genesis	TurboGrafx-16
AllGame				3.5/5	
Computer and Video Games	87%		88%		
Electronic Gaming Monthly			5/10, 6/10, 5/10, 6/10	6/10, 7/10, 5/10, 7/10	
Famitsu		7/10, 7/10, 8/10, 5/10			8/10, 7/10, 7/10, 5/10
GamePro			18/25		
Sinclair User	79%				
Console XS			91%	84%	
Hippon Super!		6/10			
MegaTech				88%	
Sega Power			93%		
Wizard				B+ (Sega CD)	

In Japan, Game Machine listed Columns as the eighth most successful table arcade unit of April 1990. It went on to be Japan's fourth highest-grossing arcade game of 1990 (below Capcom's Final Fight, Sega's Tetris and Super Monaco GP) and third highest-grossing arcade conversion kit of 1991 (below Capcom's Street Fighter II and Sega's Tetris).

Reviewing the game's appearance in Sega Arcade Classics for the Sega CD, Glenn Rubenstein gave it a B+ rating in Wizard magazine, describing it as "like Tetris but a bit better". Mega placed the game at number 34 in their "Top Mega Drive Games of All Time". In 2017, GamesRadar+ ranked the game 40th on its "Best Sega Genesis/Mega Drive games of all time".

== Legacy ==
Many sequels and spin-offs were produced: Columns II: The Voyage Through Time, Columns III: Revenge of Columns, Columns '97, Sakura Taisen: Hanagumi Taisen Columns 1 & 2, and many compilations and re-releases (Columns Arcade Collection, Sega Ages Vol. 07: Columns) as well. Since Columns was created by Sega, versions were made available on the Master System, Mega Drive/Genesis, Sega CD, Game Gear, Saturn, and Dreamcast. Additional versions of the game have also been made available for the PC Engine, Game Boy Advance, and PlayStation 2. A Super Famicom version was released in Japan via the Nintendo Power service. The Game Boy Color version was specifically called Columns GB: Osamu Tezuka Characters, where it featured many of his characters such as Kimba and Astroboy, but also featured slightly less known characters like Unico. A mobile phone version, Columns Deluxe, was released in 2008.

Columns has also been cloned many times across different platforms:

Title	Platform	Release date	Developer	Publisher	Notes
Coloris	Amiga	1990	Signum Victoriae	Avesoft	
Magic Jewelry	NES	1990	Hwang Shinwei	RCM Group	Released on unlicensed multicarts.
Columns	ZX Spectrum	1991	Piter Ltd.	Piter Ltd.	
Magic Jewelry II	NES	1991	Hwang Shinwei	RCM Group	With the addition of new features, it is the sequel to Magic Jewelry.
Jewelbox	Macintosh	1992	Rodney and Brenda Jacks	Varcon Systems	
Xixit	MS-DOS	1995	John Hood, Tomasz Pytel; music by Andrew Sega	Optik Software	
Yahoo! Towers	Java	1999/2000	Yahoo! Games	Yahoo! Games	This clone allows up to eight players to compete against each other in a 4 team format, 2 player per team.
BREF Columns	IOS, Android	2013	Mumblecore	Mumblecore	
Magic Jewelry 3	IOS, Android	2015	Guolin Ou	Guolin Ou	A magic column appears when a level is cleared, with which a player can clear all the jewels in same color.
Molums	IOS, Android	2018	Antonelli Francisco	Wisefox	
