= Hungry Dinosaurs =

1994 strategy game

- PAL cover art
- Developer: Magical Company
- Publishers: JP: Magical Company; EU: Sunsoft
- Composer: Toshiyuki Takine
- Platform: Super Nintendo Entertainment System
- Release: JP: October 19, 1994; EU: January 3, 1995
- Genre: Strategy
- Modes: Singeplayer; Multiplayer

Hungry Dinosaurs (Note: Known in Japan as Harapeko Bakka (はらぺこバッカ)) is a strategy game for the Super Nintendo Entertainment System. It was developed and published by Magical Company on October 19, 1994 in Japan, and was later published by Sunsoft in Europe on January 3, 1995. The game was never released in North America in any form.

== Gameplay ==
Screenshot of the game

The objective of the game is to place eggs by walking on a 9x9 playing field. The player can eat the eggs by pressing the B button. In order to win, the player must have more eggs than the others; failing to do so will cause the player to lose the game.

== Reception ==
Reception

Review scores
Publication	Score
M! Games	41%
Mega Fun	48%
Super Play	35%
Total!	(UK) 69/100, (DE) 2-
Video Games (DE)	25%

Hungry Dinosaurs received mixed reviews.
