= Power Pro Kun Pocket =

Video game series

Power Pro Kun Pocket (パワプロクンポケット), sometimes simply called Pawapoke or Power Pocket (パワポケ), is a spin-off of the Power Pros series of baseball games developed by Baseball Contents Production. The series was released on the Game Boy Color, Game Boy Advance, Nintendo DS, and Nintendo Switch only in Japan.

Originally, the game was planned to link the story with the Success Mode storyline in the main (Power Pros) series, but the series now departs from the world of Power Pros and forms independent storylines. Since the 8th iteration, Konami used Baseball variety instead of Sport/Simulation as a game genre. Instead of baseball, the portion in Success Mode was much larger than the main series.

== Gameplay ==
Although the game nearly retains everything, including the feature of Power Pros series mascot (The Power Pro-kun: a Rayman like character without face parts (other than eyes) and have its legs detached from the rest of its body) using nearly the same game system as the main series, the Power Pro-kun Pocket series is completely different from its main series in other aspects. It uses a more simple system in baseball than their main series. Many features outside the Success Mode were removed from the series, but features related to Success Mode are increased.

As a feature of the whole Power Pros series, passwords produced in the Pawapoke series can be transferred to Nintendo consoles' Power Pro series for playing, but the ability may be weakened a lot.

=== Differences between Pawapuro and Pawapoke series ===
Here are some of the major differences between the two series:

==== For baseball ====
- There are no real ballparks included, other than Koshien Stadium.
- Farm team players are not included in the series. Individual default tactics towards team and players are not available.
- No coaches, managers, player flows and growth in pennant mode.
- Card Baseball can be played instead from the ninth to the twelfth game (introduced by spin-off Power Pro Kun Pocket Dash).
- Real Baseball can be played instead for the thirteenth and fourteenth games (replacing the Card Baseball).

==== For abilities ====
- Existence of Super Ability, which are stronger than usual abilities.
- Changes of explanation, and effects of some abilities.
- Name changes for some abilities: abilities in Power Pro series with the suffix 2 becomes X (△ for 10), 4 becomes ○ and 5 becomes ◎.

==== For game modes ====
- Money system was introduced to buy expansion teams, mini games, or some other features (similarly to MLB Power Pros).
- Mini games are included in nearly every series. Some can be played upon certain conditions, but most needed to be obtained by Success Mode.

== The Success Mode in Power Pro Kun Pocket series ==
Other than the first game (one success mode), and Koshien (does not feature any success mode), all other Power Pro Kun Pocket titles feature at least two different success modes, which are called "Outer-Success" and "Inner-Success". Unlike the Power Pros series, this series did not follow storyline with realism, and many fantasy elements were mixed into the series. The series was greatly influenced by Tokimeki Memorial series. Konami said that the series became "a Gal-game with baseball contents", making them to change its genre to "Baseball Variety".

Like the Power Pro's setting, fictional pro teams exist in the series as well, but it is completely different teams since the setting has been developing on its own now.

=== Super Ability ===
There exist 10 rare abilities collectively called Super Ability, which can give a great increase to statistics (can exceed limit) or have more negative effects towards opponent players. Pitcher and fielders have a separate 5-set ability and no one can hold more than one Super Abilities. Some Super Abilities will cancel out other Super Abilities in play. Such abilities will not be kept when the player is transferred to the Power Pro series.

The only way to obtain the Super Abilities is playing in Success Mode. In "Outer-Success", players can obtain Super Abilities by finishing the girl's endings, which each of them keep two (one each for pitcher and fielder) Super Abilities. In each of the series there exist a wild-card girl character, who can give any Super Abilities by players' choice, but usually it needs tougher requirements.

== Games in the series ==
=== Main series ===
- Power Pro Kun Pocket (GB) - 1 April 1999
- Power Pro Kun Pocket 2 (GB) - 30 March 2000
- Power Pro Kun Pocket 3 (GBA) - 21 March 2001
- Power Pro Kun Pocket 4 (GBA) - 20 March 2002
- Power Pro Kun Pocket 5 (GBA) - 23 January 2003
- Power Pro Kun Pocket 6 (GBA) - 4 December 2003
- Power Pro Kun Pocket 7 (GBA) - 2 December 2004
- Power Pro Kun Pocket 8 (DS) - 1 December 2005
- Power Pro Kun Pocket 9 (DS) - 7 December 2006
- Power Pro Kun Pocket 10 (DS) - 6 December 2007
- Power Pro Kun Pocket 11 (DS) - 18 December 2008
- Power Pro Kun Pocket 12 (DS) - 3 December 2009
- Power Pro Kun Pocket 13 (DS) - 25 November 2010
- Power Pro Kun Pocket 14 (DS) - 1 December 2011

=== Remake ===
- Power Pro Kun Pocket 1・2 (GBA) - 29 July 2004
- Power Pro Kun Pocket R (Switch) - 25 November 2021

=== Spin-offs ===
- Power Pocket Dash (GBA) - 23 March 2006
