= Tsuppari Wars =

1991 video game

- Developer(s): Sammy
- Publisher(s): Sammy
- Platform(s): Family Computer
- Release: JP: June 28, 1991
- Genre(s): Action
- Mode(s): Single-player, multiplayer

Tsuppari Wars (つっぱりウォーズ; "Delinquent Wars") is an action video game for the Family Computer. The object is to acquire all of the enemies' territory and defeat the evil gang leaders. Even though this game was only released in Japan, the gangsters fight without any weapons and the violence level is mild compared to later gang-related games.

== Gameplay ==
=== Strategy ===
A couple of computer controlled street gangs are fighting on an urban street.

Once the main gang leader is defeated in either Tsuppari Wars (ツッパリウォーズ) or Tsuppari Suku (ツッパリスク) mode, the remaining members of the gang switch membership to become a gray-colored gang that does not have a leader. Consequently, all territory that belonged to leader that was killed in combat becomes neutral territory with a number describing the strength of the "neutral gangs." These "neutral gangs" will attempt to defend their turf. In order for a gang with colors (red, blue, or green) to use the land as their own, they must eliminate all the gangsters in that territory. However, invasions can be canceled before they can begin by saying "no" when asked to fight (たたかい; "Struggle").

Neutral gangs, fortunately, do not have ability to invade the territories of the red, blue, or green colored gangs. There are three difficulty levels for computer opponents and games are possible with two or three colors (but never with only one color). After naming the character (using the Japanese alphabet), the player selects a face to represent the gang's leader. The two gang leaders involved will use a special fighting game engine to settle their differences while individual gang members will fight each other through a special battle screen. The battle screen allows players to use special effects against the opponent, like a motorcycle, a thunderstorm, or even a quick call to the police's riot squad.

All brawls are timed by a timer which is never seen in the game. That means if there is no determined winner in a certain amount of time, the brawl ends with a stalemate and no territory gains or losses are made. The brawl can be re-initiated either during the player's next turn or during the opponent's turn. There are eight different maps to choose from that depict the world in a manner similar to the board game Risk. There are islands with land bridges and bodies of water to them. Between combat, players can either move (いどうし; "Not among") their gang members from territory to territory or immediately end their turn. It is possible for players to transfer all of their gang members out of a territory, turning it into a blank grey territory without a number.

=== Fighting ===
In addition to the strategy mode, there is also a variation of the game that focus exclusively on street fighting using either the 1P Taiman Battle (1P タイマンバトル) or the 2P Taiman Battle (2P タイマンバトル) mode. With a cast of 20 characters, it was considered to be one of largest line-ups for an 8-bit fighting game compared to Nekketsu Kakutō Densetsu with 22 characters, Tenkaichi Bushi Keru Nagūru having 16 characters in 1989, and Joy Mech Fight which has 36 characters. Out of the 20 available characters, the player must pick five and the computer must do the same. When a fighter is defeated, he is eliminated and is forced to play against the next fighter. Victory is assured when the opponent's fifth fighter is defeated.
