= Go Go Golf =

2000 video game

- European cover art for Go Go Golf
- Developer(s): Mahou
- Publisher(s): JP: Mahou; EU: Midas Interactive Entertainment
- Platform(s): PlayStation 2
- Release: JP: September 21, 2000; EU: November 29, 2002
- Genre(s): Sports game
- Mode(s): Single-player, multiplayer

Go Go Golf, known in Japan as Magical Sports Series Go Go Golf (マジカルスポーツ ゴルフ Go Go Golf), is a golf-simulation video game originally released in 2000 for the PlayStation 2. It was developed by Mahou and published by Midas Interactive Entertainment in Europe in 2002.

== Gameplay ==
Go Go Golf offers three 18 hole courses across various landscapes - the desert, mountains and woods.
