= Power Pros =

- Artwork of Power Pro-kun, mascot of the series, often main character of some game modes and often shown in game covers
- Genres: Sports (baseball)
- Developers: Power Pros Production; Joymoa
- Publishers: JP: Konami; NA: 2K
- Creators: Isao Akada; Naoki Nishikawa; Kōji Toyohara
- Artist: Fujioka Kenji
- Platforms: Android; Arcade; BlackBerry; Dreamcast; Game Boy; iOS; Windows; Nintendo 3DS; Nintendo 64; Nintendo DS; GameCube; Switch; PlayStation; PlayStation 2; PlayStation 3; PlayStation 4; PlayStation Portable; Vita; Saturn; Super Famicom; Wii
- First release: Jikkyō Powerful Pro Yakyū '94; March 11, 1994
- Latest release: Powerful Pro Yakyū 2026–2027; June 11, 2026
- Spin-offs: Professional Baseball Spirits; Power Pro Kun Pocket; Jikkyō Powerful Soccer; Powerful Golf

Powerful Pro Yakyū (Note: Japanese: パワフルプロ野球, Hepburn: Pawafuru Puro Yakyū; lit. 'Powerful Pro Baseball'), previously known as Jikkyō Powerful Pro Yakyū (Note: Japanese: 実況パワフルプロ野球, Hepburn: Jikkyō Pawafuru Puro Yakyū; lit. 'Live Powerful Pro Baseball') in Japanese, commonly abbreviated as Power Pro (Note: Japanese: パワプロ, Hepburn: Pawapuro) and marketed internationally as Power Pros, is a Japanese baseball video game series created by Konami. It is known for its super deformed characters and fast-paced, yet deep, gameplay. Most games in the series are developed under license from Nippon Professional Baseball (NPB) and the Japan Professional Baseball Players Association (JPBPA), allowing the use of team names, stadiums, colors, and players' names and likenesses. Six games in the series also feature licenses from Major League Baseball (MLB) and the Major League Baseball Players Association (MLBPA), two from the Korea Baseball Organization (KBO) and Korea Professional Baseball Players Association (KPBPA), and one from the World Baseball Classic.

The series began in 1994 on the Super Famicom and has since appeared on many platforms: Sega Saturn (1995–1997), PlayStation (1994–2003), Nintendo 64 (1997–2001), PlayStation 2 (2000–2009), Dreamcast (2000), GameCube (2002–2006), Wii (2007–2009), PlayStation 3 (2010–2016), PlayStation 4 (since 2016), PlayStation Portable (2007–2013), and Vita (2012–2018). In 2019, it appeared on the Nintendo Switch, despite only in Japan. This game, dubbed Jikkyō Powerful Pro Yakyū also featured a collectible card series of six figures that work as Amiibo within the game.

The game has two spin-off series: Professional Baseball Spirits, which features more realistic graphics and physics, and Power Pro Kun Pocket, released on handheld systems from 1999 to 2011, including the Game Boy Color, Game Boy Advance, and Nintendo DS. Although originally part of the main series, Konami retroactively declared Power Pro Kun Pocket a separate series.

A version of Power Pro featuring Major League Baseball players was released under the title Jikkyō Powerful Major League in May 2006. The Power Pro series has included online play since its tenth installment on the PlayStation 2 and the first handheld version on the PlayStation Portable. A version for the PlayStation 3 was shown at the Tokyo Game Show in 2005, but it took five years to release the game on the PS3. During that time, the Professional Baseball Spirits series filled the gap. Another title, MLB Power Pros, was published by 2K for the PlayStation 2 and Wii in October 2007, and featured a Success Mode set within Major League Baseball.

The most distinctive feature of the Power Pro series is its depiction of characters. Power Pro baseball players are short with large, gashapon capsule-shaped heads, lacking a mouth, nose, and ears. Their expressions come mainly from their eyebrows. Similar to Rayman, they have no legs, and their feet are not connected to their bodies. Their hands are spherical and fingerless.

In Japan, the series has been critically acclaimed and commercially successful, while in North America, it received mixed to generally favorable reviews but sold poorly. As of March 2023, the series has sold over 24.7 million copies, with 48 million mobile game downloads as of October 2022.

== Games in the series ==
This is the major system development in the main series (as well as information about the season series and MLB Power Pros series). Some minor developments, such as player abilities, are not included.

=== Jikkyō Powerful Pro Yakyū '94 ===
Released on February 24, 1994, for the Super Famicom, the game is licensed by Nippon Professional Baseball and the Japanese Professional Baseball Players Association, though Meiji Jingu Stadium and Hanshin Koshien Stadium are listed under fictional names. Success mode is not included in the first two installments. Commentary is provided by Asahi Broadcasting Corporation radio commentator Abe Noriyuki.

=== Jikkyō Powerful Pro Yakyū 2 ===
Released on February 24, 1995, for the Super Famicom, this is the first game in the series to feature a full Pennant mode and save game functionality. Hanshin Koshien Stadium is fully licensed, but Meiji Jingu Stadium remains under a fictional name. Commentary is provided by Asahi Broadcasting Corporation radio commentator Motoharu Ōta.

=== Jikkyō Powerful Pro Yakyū 3 ===
Released on February 29, 1996, for the Super Famicom. Success mode, which later becomes a core feature of the Power Pro series, is introduced in this game. Commentary is again provided by Abe Noriyuki, who remained in this role until Power Pro 8.

=== Jikkyō Powerful Pro Yakyū 4 ===
Released on March 14, 1997, for the Nintendo 64. With the hardware upgrade, the game's graphics (polygon-based stadiums) and controls saw significant improvements. Success mode introduces original characters, some of whom continue to appear in later installments.

=== Jikkyō Powerful Pro Yakyū 5 ===
Released on March 26, 1998, for the Nintendo 64, it became the best-selling game for the Nintendo 64 in Japan during that month.

=== Jikkyō Powerful Pro Yakyū 6 ===
Also known as Jikkyō Powerful Pro Yakyū 6, it was released on March 25, 1999, for the Nintendo 64.

=== Jikkyō Powerful Pro Yakyū 7 ===
The first game in the series released on the PlayStation 2, and the first with fully polygon-based graphics. IGN found the game fun but criticized its "horrible" graphics and lack of power on the new console. Initially scheduled for release on March 4, 2000, it was later delayed to July 6.

=== Jikkyō Powerful Pro Yakyū 8 ===
This installment features the first vocalized opening in the series, "Little Soldier" by Chihiro Yonekura. The opening animations were produced by Kyoto Animation, which primarily worked on animation post-production at that time. Kyoto Animation continued to produce the openings for the series until Power Pro 11, after which they shifted focus to projects like the anime adaptation of Air by Visual Arts/Key. The production of game openings was then passed to Production I.G from Power Pro 12 onward.

=== Jikkyō Powerful Pro Yakyū 9 ===
Released on both PlayStation 2 and GameCube, this was the first game in the series available on multiple platforms. This title also introduced cel shading graphics, a significant visual change.

=== Jikkyō Powerful Pro Yakyū 10 ===
This installment was the first to allow players to create entire teams rather than just individual players in Success Mode. Online multiplayer was introduced for the first time in the main series, and was also the only title that enabled cross-platform play. Additionally, MyLife Mode made its debut, allowing players to control an actual Japan League player rather than an original character, although created players from Success Mode were still playable.

=== Jikkyō Powerful Pro Yakyū 11 ===
Created to celebrate the 10th anniversary of the Power Pro series, this game introduced audio endings in Success Mode, produced by Kyoto Animation. Other new features included the ability to break bats and perform safety bunts.

=== Jikkyō Powerful Pro Yakyū 12 ===
This installment introduced a modified player password system, making passwords incompatible with previous Nintendo-based games, but passwords from Power Pro 12 to 14 could still be used on the Portable 1 and Portable 2 versions on Sony platforms. The game also introduced a Cheering Songs Editor, which allowed players to create and transfer cheering songs using passwords between Sony platform games.

=== Jikkyō Powerful Major League ===
This game marked the first time the series featured MLB instead of NPB. It also included the license for the 2009 World Baseball Classic.

=== Jikkyō Powerful Pro Yakyū 13 ===
With Nintendo's GameCube production discontinued by this point, this installment was released only on the PlayStation 2. It introduced significant system changes, such as an online mode, where players could now control only one player on the team, rather than the entire team. Scenario Mode, a long-standing feature of the series, was removed.

=== Jikkyō Powerful Pro Yakyū 14/Wii ===
The Wii platform replaced the GameCube for this installment. The game supported motion controls on the Wii version and online multiplayer, where players controlled three players at a time. In Success Mode, players could lead a high school team to compete in the Summer Koshien tournament. The mode also featured current Japanese NPB players as members of the National Team.

=== Jikkyō Powerful Major League 2 (MLB Power Pros) ===
This title marked the official debut of the series in North America, featuring several Japanese players who had transitioned to Major League Baseball.

=== Jikkyō Powerful Pro Yakyū 2009/NEXT ===
Released for the 15th anniversary of the series, Power Pro 2009/NEXT reintroduced numbered versions for the first time since Power Pro '94. Different versions of the game featured unique content based on the specific console and control features.

=== Jikkyō Powerful Pro Yakyū 2010 ===
Released on July 15, 2010, for the PlayStation 3 and PlayStation Portable, this was the first game in the series to support high-definition video at 1080p resolution and true 5.1 surround sound (LPCM). The MyLife Mode was omitted from the PlayStation 3 version.

=== Jikkyō Powerful Pro Yakyū 2011 ===
Released on July 14, 2011, for the PlayStation 3 and PlayStation Portable. Unlike the previous version, the two platforms had the same content.

=== Jikkyō Powerful Pro Yakyū 2012 ===
Released on July 19, 2012, for the PlayStation 3, PlayStation Portable, and PlayStation Vita, this installment introduced significant gameplay mechanics, including the Power Stadium Mode, available only on PlayStation 3 and Vita versions.

=== Jikkyō Powerful Pro Yakyū 2013 ===
Released on October 24, 2013, for the PlayStation 3, PlayStation Portable, and PlayStation Vita. Unlike Power Pro 2012, this game was also compatible with the PlayStation TV microconsole.

=== Jikkyō Powerful Pro Yakyū 2014 ===
Released on October 23, 2014, for the PlayStation 3 and PlayStation Vita to commemorate the series' 20th anniversary, this was the first installment in the main series to feature active Japanese MLB players as "OB players" (retired players).

=== Jikkyō Powerful Pro Yakyū 2016 ===
Released on April 28, 2016, for the PlayStation 3, PlayStation 4, and PlayStation Vita to celebrate the 20th anniversary of Success Mode, the game introduced many gameplay elements from the Professional Baseball Spirits series. The game was later updated with 2017 season rosters, allowing players to choose between 2016 and 2017 rosters. Two new modes, "Power Fest" and "Challenge", were also introduced.

=== Jikkyō Powerful Pro Yakyū 2018 ===
Released on April 28, 2018, for the PlayStation 4 and PlayStation Vita, Power Pro 2018 was the first game in the series to support PlayStation VR and PlayStation 4 Pro, along with high-dynamic-range video (HDR) and 2160p resolution. The game included a new mode, "Live Scenario", adapted from Professional Baseball Spirits 2015. A 2019 season pack was later added as an update.

=== Jikkyō Powerful Pro Yakyū (Nintendo Switch) ===
Released on June 27, 2019, for the Nintendo Switch, this installment of the series featured a Success Mode that was a remake of scenarios from Power Pro 9.

=== eBaseball Powerful Pro Yakyū 2020 ===
Released on July 9, 2020, for the PlayStation 4 and Nintendo Switch, this game marked the first entry in the series to incorporate Konami's eBASEBALL branding into its official title.

=== eBaseball Powerful Pro Yakyū 2022 ===
Released on April 21, 2022, for the PlayStation 4 and Nintendo Switch, this installment's Success Mode (called "Rivals") featured selected events from Power Pro 9, Power Pro 13, and Power Pro 2011.

=== WBSC eBaseball: Power Pros ===
Released on February 8, 2023 for Nintendo Switch and PlayStation 4, this game was a collaboration between Konami and the World Baseball Softball Confederation (WBSC). It was the first game in the series to feature English text since MLB Power Pros and also included Japanese voiceovers in the English release.

=== Powerful Pro Yakyū 2024–2025 ===
Powerful Pro Yakyū 2024 – 2025 is a baseball simulation video game in the Power Pro series, developed by Konami and Power Pro Production for the Nintendo Switch and PlayStation 4, released on July 18, 2024. Released in celebration of the series' 30th anniversary and the 20th anniversary of the Professional Baseball Spirits series, this installment features Shohei Ohtani as the ambassador. For the first time, the game title is written in two-year increments, and the "eBASEBALL" branding has been removed, though it remains part of the overall brand identity.

=== Powerful Pro Yakyū 2026–2027 ===
Powerful Pro Yakyū 2026 – 2027 is a baseball simulation video game in the Power Pro series, developed by Konami and Power Pro Production for the Nintendo Switch and PlayStation 4, will be released on Summer 2026. Just like previous installment, this installment features Shohei Ohtani as the ambassador, and also as the second installment that the game title is written in two-year increments and did not featured the "eBASEBALL" branding.

== List of games in the series ==
Below is a rough list of the games within the Power Pro series, which can be categorized as follows:

Main series: This series is identified by numeric suffixes (except for '94, the first installment). Most significant system updates, including success mode, are incorporated into the main series. Numeric designations are not used after 15.

Season series: A PlayStation exclusive series, identified by a year suffix, serves as an alternate installment of the main series, which is available on the Super Famicom and PlayStation 2. This series has been merged with the main series following the discontinuation of the PlayStation. Since 1998, two installments have been released each year: a standard version at the start of the season and one named Kettei-ban (post-season version). The latter includes statistics and sometimes player transfers that reflect performance during the season. This practice has become a Konami tradition, even after the merger, similar to the Winning Eleven series, which receives more frequent updates. The Kettei-ban version was canceled in 15 but continued on Pro Baseball Spirits, but the year series was revived afterward.

MLB Power Pro series: This is the only series officially released in America, featuring MLB teams instead of traditional Japanese NPB teams, although a Japanese version is also available.

The passwords cannot be used across different manufacturers' consoles (Sony and Nintendo each have their own password formats). Additionally, passwords from the Japanese version of Power Pros cannot be used in the American version.

=== Main series ===
Game	Release date	Platform
Jikkyō Powerful Pro Yakyū '94	March 11, 1994	Super Famicom
Jikkyō Powerful Pro Yakyū 2	February 24, 1995	Super Famicom
Jikkyō Powerful Pro Yakyū '95	December 22, 1994	PlayStation
Jikkyō Powerful Pro Yakyū 3	February 29, 1996	Super Famicom
Jikkyō Powerful Pro Yakyū '97 Spring	March 20, 1997	Super Famicom
Jikkyō Powerful Pro Yakyū 4	March 14, 1997	Nintendo 64
Jikkyō Powerful Pro Yakyū 5	March 26, 1998	Nintendo 64
Jikkyō Powerful Pro Yakyū 6	March 25, 1999	Nintendo 64
Jikkyō Powerful Pro Yakyū 7	July 6, 2000	PlayStation 2
Jikkyō Powerful Pro Yakyū 7 Ketteiban	December 21, 2000	PlayStation 2
Jikkyō Powerful Pro Yakyū 8	August 30, 2001	PlayStation 2
Jikkyō Powerful Pro Yakyū 8 Ketteiban	December 20, 2001	PlayStation 2
Jikkyō Powerful Pro Yakyū 9	July 18, 2002	PlayStation 2, GameCube
Jikkyō Powerful Pro Yakyū 9 Ketteiban	December 19, 2002	PlayStation 2, GameCube
Jikkyō Powerful Pro Yakyū 10	July 17, 2003	PlayStation 2, GameCube
Jikkyō Powerful Pro Yakyū 10 Ultra Ketteiban: 2003 Memorial	December 18, 2003	PlayStation 2, GameCube
Jikkyō Powerful Pro Yakyū 11	July 15, 2004	PlayStation 2, GameCube
Jikkyō Powerful Pro Yakyū 11 Ultra Ketteiban	December 16, 2004	PlayStation 2, GameCube
Jikkyō Powerful Pro Yakyū 12	July 14, 2005	PlayStation 2, GameCube
Jikkyō Powerful Pro Yakyū 12 Ketteiban	December 15, 2005	PlayStation 2, GameCube
Jikkyō Powerful Pro Yakyū 13	July 13, 2006	PlayStation 2
Jikkyō Powerful Pro Yakyū 13 Ketteiban	December 14, 2006	PlayStation 2
Jikkyō Powerful Pro Yakyū 14	July 19, 2007	PlayStation 2
Jikkyō Powerful Pro Yakyū14 Ketteiban	December 20, 2007	PlayStation 2
Jikkyō Powerful Pro Yakyū 15	July 24, 2008	PlayStation 2, Wii
Jikkyō Powerful Pro Yakyū 2009	March 19, 2009	PlayStation 2
Jikkyō Powerful Pro Yakyū 2010	July 15, 2010	PlayStation 3, PlayStation Portable
Jikkyō Powerful Pro Yakyū 2011	July 14, 2011	PlayStation 3, PlayStation Portable
Jikkyō Powerful Pro Yakyū 2011 Ketteiban	December 22, 2011	PlayStation 3, PlayStation Portable
Jikkyō Powerful Pro Yakyū 2012	July 19, 2012	PlayStation 3, PlayStation Portable, PlayStation Vita
Jikkyō Powerful Pro Yakyū 2012 Ketteiban	December 13, 2012	PlayStation 3, PlayStation Portable, PlayStation Vita
Jikkyō Powerful Pro Yakyū 2013	October 24, 2013	PlayStation 3, PlayStation Portable, PlayStation Vita
Jikkyō Powerful Pro Yakyū 2014	October 23, 2014	PlayStation 3, PlayStation Vita
Jikkyō Powerful Pro Yakyū 2016	April 28, 2016	PlayStation 4, PlayStation 3, PlayStation Vita
Jikkyō Powerful Pro Yakyū 2018	April 26, 2018	PlayStation 4, PlayStation Vita
eBaseball Powerful Pro Yakyū 2020	July 9, 2020	PlayStation 4, Nintendo Switch
eBaseball Powerful Pro Yakyū 2022	April 21, 2022	PlayStation 4, Nintendo Switch
WBSC eBaseball: Power Pros	February 8, 2023	PlayStation 4, Nintendo Switch
Powerful Pro Yakyū 2024–2025	July 18, 2024	PlayStation 4, Nintendo Switch
Powerful Pro Yakyū 2026–2027	June 11, 2026	PlayStation 4, Nintendo Switch

=== Consumer series ===
- Jikkyō Powerful Pro Yakyū '95 (PS) – December 22, 1994
- Jikkyō Powerful Pro Yakyū '95 Kaimaku-ban (PS, SS) – July 14, 1995 (PS), July 28, 1995 (SS)
- Jikkyō Powerful Pro Yakyū '96 Kaimaku-ban (SFC) – July 19, 1996
- Jikkyō Powerful Pro Yakyū '97 Kaimaku-ban (PS) – August 28, 1997
- Jikkyō Powerful Pro Yakyū S (SS) – December 4, 1997
- Jikkyō Powerful Pro Yakyū Basic-ban '98 (SFC) – March 19, 1998
- Power Pro GB (GB) – March 26, 1998
- Jikkyō Powerful Pro Yakyū '98 Kaimaku-ban (PS) – July 23, 1998
- Jikkyō Powerful Pro Yakyū '98 Ketteihan (PS) – December 23, 1998
- Jikkyō Powerful Pro Yakyū '99 Kaimaku-ban (PS) – July 22, 1999
- Jikkyō Powerful Pro Yakyū '99 Ketteihan (PS) – December 25, 1999
- Jikkyō Powerful Pro Yakyū Dreamcast Edition (DC) – March 30, 2000
- Jikkyō Powerful Pro Yakyū 2000 (N64) – April 29, 2000
- Jikkyō Powerful Pro Yakyū 2000 Kaimaku-ban (PS) – July 19, 2000
- Jikkyō Powerful Pro Yakyū 2000 Ketteihan (PS) – December 21, 2000
- Jikkyō Powerful Pro Yakyū Basic-ban 2001 (N64) – March 29, 2001
- Jikkyō Powerful Pro Yakyū 2001 (PS) – June 7, 2001
- Jikkyō Powerful Pro Yakyū 2001 Ketteihan (PS) – December 20, 2001
- Jikkyō Powerful Pro Yakyū 2002 Haru (PS) – March 14, 2002
- Jikkyō Powerful Pro Yakyū Premium-ban (PS) – January 23, 2003
- Jikkyō Powerful Pro Yakyū Portable (PSP) – April 1, 2006
- Jikkyō Powerful Major League (PS2, GC) – May 11, 2006
- Jikkyō Powerful Pro Yakyū Portable 2 (PSP) – April 5, 2007
- Jikkyō Powerful Pro Yakyū Wii (Wii) – July 19, 2007
- Ketteiban Jikkyō Powerful Pro Yakyū Wii (Wii) – December 20, 2007
- Jikkyō Powerful Major League 2 (a.k.a. MLB Power Pros) (PS2, Wii) – October 4, 2007 (Overseas Edition: October 3, 2007)
- Jikkyō Powerful Pro Yakyū Portable 3 (PSP) – May 29, 2008
- Jikkyō Powerful Major League 3 (a.k.a. MLB Power Pros 2008) (PS2, Wii, DS) – October 3, 2008 (Overseas Edition: July 29, 2008)
- Jikkyō Powerful Pro Yakyū NEXT (Wii) – March 19, 2009
- Jikkyō Powerful Pro Yakyū 2009 (PS2, Wii) – April 29, 2009
- Jikkyō Powerful Pro Yakyū Portable 4 (PSP) – September 17, 2009
- Power Pro Success Legends (PSP) – February 25, 2010
- Jikkyō Powerful Pro Yakyū 2010 (PS3, PSP) – July 15, 2010

=== Arcade series ===
- Jikkyō Powerful Pro Yakyū '96 (Arcade) – 1996
- Jikkyō Powerful Pro Yakyū EX (Arcade) – 1997
- Jikkyō Powerful Pro Yakyū '98 EX – 1998
- Jikkyō Powerful Pro Yakyū Ball Spark (Arcade) – 2015

=== PC series ===
- Jikkyō Powerful Pro Yakyū '96 (Win) – February 21, 1997
- Jikkyō Powerful Pro Yakyū (Win) – 1998
- Jikkyō Powerful Pro Yakyū Online Taisen-ban (Win) – 2001

=== Play Online series ===
- Powerful Pro Yakyū Online – April 30, 2004

=== Mobile phones ===
- Power Pro World Success Kōkō Yakyū-hen – 2005
- Power Pro World Success Daigaku Yakyū-hen – 2006
- Mobile Powerful Pro Yakyū Kōshiki License-ban (NTT DoCoMo, au by KDDI, SoftBank) – 2007
- Mobile Powerful Pro Yakyū Kōshiki License-ban (NTT DoCoMo, au by KDDI, SoftBank) – 2008
- Power Pro World Success Shakaijin Yakyū-hen – 2009
- Power Pro World Mobile – Powerful Pro Yakyū MEGA-X – 2009
- Power Pro World Mobile Powerful Pro Yakyū 6 – 2009
- Power Pro World Success Nettō Kōkō Yakyū-hen – 2010
- Mobile Powerful Pro Yakyū 3D – 2010
- Social Appli Power Pro Home Run Kyōsō for GREE – 2011
- Power Pro Success (パワプロ サクサクセス) – 2013
- Jikkyō Powerful Pro Yakyū (iOS/Android) – 2014
- Power Pro Puzzle – 2021
- Powerful Pro Baseball Eikan Nine Crossroad – 2023

=== Card games ===
- Powerful Pro Yakyū Card Game – 2006
- Powerful Major League Card Game – 2006

=== Other appearances ===
- Konami Krazy Racers (GBA, 2001) – a Power Pro-kun appears as a racer.
- DreamMix TV World Fighters (GC, 2003) – a Power Pro-kun appears as a playable character, along with a Power Pro Stadium stage.
- New International Track and Field (DS, 2008) – a Power Pro-kun appears as a playable character.
- Krazy Kart Racing (iOS & Android, 2009) – a Power Pro-kun appears as a racer.

=== Related productions ===
- Sunday x Magazine: Nettou! Dream Nine (DS, 2009) – another baseball game developed by Power Pros Production, featuring characters from Weekly Shōnen Sunday and Weekly Shōnen Magazine's manga such as Major, Ace of Diamond, Touch, Hajime no Ippo, Tensai Bakabon, and Detective Conan.

== Reception ==
=== Critical reception ===
The series generally received favorable reviews from Japanese video game magazines. Twelve installments have received the "silver prize" (30–31/40) from Famitsu, while twenty-seven have received the "gold prize" (32–34/40), and twenty installments have earned the "platinum prize". Only seven games in the series have received a score below 30/40.

Critical reception
Year	Title	Famitsu score
Main games
1994	Jikkyō Powerful Pro Yakyū '94	34/40 (SFC)
1995	Jikkyō Powerful Pro Yakyū 2	31/40 (SFC)
1996	Jikkyō Powerful Pro Yakyū 3	30/40 (SFC)
1997	Jikkyō Powerful Pro Yakyū 4	33/40 (N64)
1998	Jikkyō Powerful Pro Yakyū 5	33/40 (N64)
1999	Jikkyō Powerful Pro Yakyū 6	36/40 (N64)
2000	Jikkyō Powerful Pro Yakyū 7	35/40 (PS2)
2001	Jikkyō Powerful Pro Yakyū 8	33/40 (PS2)
2002	Jikkyō Powerful Pro Yakyū 9	34/40 (GCN/PS2)
2003	Jikkyō Powerful Pro Yakyū 10	36/40 (GCN/PS2)
2004	Jikkyō Powerful Pro Yakyū 11	35/40 (GCN/PS2)
2005	Jikkyō Powerful Pro Yakyū 12	35/40(PS2); 33/40 (GCN)
2006	Jikkyō Powerful Pro Yakyū 13	33/40 (PS2)
2007	Jikkyō Powerful Pro Yakyū 14/Wii	34/40 (Wii)
2008	Jikkyō Powerful Pro Yakyū 15	35/40 (PS2/Wii)
2009	Jikkyō Powerful Pro Yakyū 2009	28/40 (PS2)
2010	Jikkyō Powerful Pro Yakyū 2010'	38/40 (PS3); 34/40 (PSP)
2011	Jikkyō Powerful Pro Yakyū 2011	37/40 (PS3); 36/40 (PSP)
2012	Jikkyō Powerful Pro Yakyū 2012	36/40 (PS Vita); 35/40 (PS3); 33/40 (PSP)
2013	Jikkyō Powerful Pro Yakyū 2013	35/40 (PS3); 34/40 (PS Vita); 31/40 (PSP)
2014	Jikkyō Powerful Pro Yakyū 2014	35/40 (PS3/PS Vita)
2016	Jikkyō Powerful Pro Yakyū 2016	37/40 (PS3/PS4/PS Vita)
2018	Jikkyō Powerful Pro Yakyū 2018	38/40 (PS4/PS Vita)
Roster updates
2003	Jikkyō Powerful Pro Yakyū 10 Chō Kettei-ban 2003 Memorial	33/40 (GCN/PS2)
2004	Jikkyō Powerful Pro Yakyū 11 Chō Kettei-ban	32/40 (GCN/PS2)
2005	Jikkyō Powerful Pro Yakyū 12 Kettei-ban	33/40 (PS2); 32/40 (GCN)
2006	Jikkyō Powerful Pro Yakyū 13 Kettei-ban	35/40 (PS2)
2007	Jikkyō Powerful Pro Yakyū 14/Wii Kettei-ban	34/40 (Wii); 33/40 (PS2)
2012	Jikkyō Powerful Pro Yakyū 2012 Kettei-ban	35/40 (PS Vita); 34/40 (PS3); 33/40 (PSP)
Side games
1994	Jikkyō Powerful Pro Yakyū '95	31/40 (PS)
1995	Jikkyō Powerful Pro Yakyū '95 Kaimaku-ban	31/40 (SS)
1997	Jikkyō Powerful Pro Yakyū '97 Kaimaku-ban	29/40 (PS)
1997	Jikkyō Powerful Pro Yakyū S	26/40 (SS)
1998	Power Pro GB	20/40 (GB)
1998	Jikkyō Powerful Pro Yakyū '98 Kaimaku-ban	30/40 (PS)
1999	Jikkyō Powerful Pro Yakyū '99 Kaimaku-ban	33/40 (PS)
1999	Jikkyō Powerful Pro Yakyū '99 Kettei-ban	33/40 (PS)
2000	Jikkyō Powerful Pro Yakyū Dreamcast Edition	31/40 (DC)
2000	Jikkyō Powerful Pro Yakyū 2000	34/40 (PS)
2000	Jikkyō Powerful Pro Yakyū 2000 Kaimaku-ban	29/40 (PS)
2001	Jikkyō Powerful Pro Yakyū 2001	30/40 (PS)
2002	Jikkyō Powerful Pro Yakyū 2002 Haru	31/40 (PS)
2006	Jikkyō Powerful Pro Yakyū Portable	32/40 (PSP)
2007	Jikkyō Powerful Pro Yakyū Portable 2	34/40 (PSP)
2008	Jikkyō Powerful Pro Yakyū Portable 3	33/40 (PSP)
2009	Jikkyō Powerful Pro Yakyū Next	34/40 (Wii)
2009	Jikkyō Powerful Pro Yakyū Portable 4	35/40 (PSP)
2010	Power Pro Success Legends	29/40 (PSP)
2010	Nettō! Powerful Kōshinen	31/40 (NDS)
2016	Jikkyō Powerful Pro Yakyū Heroes	30/40 (3DS)
Major League subseries
2006	Jikkyō Powerful Major League	34/40 (GCN)
2007	Jikkyō Powerful Major League 2	30/40 (PS2/Wii)
2008	Jikkyō Powerful Major League 3	31/40 (PS2/Wii)
2009	Jikkyō Powerful Major League 2009	35/40 (PS2/Wii)

=== Commercial reception ===
As of March 2023, the series has sold over 24.7 million copies, in addition to 48 million mobile game downloads as of October 2022. Power Pros is the best-selling baseball video game franchise in Japan since 1997. '97 Kaimaku-ban, '98 Kaimaku-ban, '99 Kaimaku-ban, 10, 12, 2013, 2016, and 2018 earned the gold prize at PlayStation Awards, for shipping more than 500,000 units, including downloads, in Asia.

The mobile game Jikkyō Powerful Pro Yakyū has received 43 million downloads.

== Adaptations ==
A 4-part web series based on the mobile phone version of the game was produced by CloverWorks.
