= Jikkyō Powerful Pro Yakyū '95 =

1994 sports video game

- Developer: Baseball Contents Production
- Publisher: Konami
- Platforms: Original version PlayStation; Kaimaku-ban; PlayStation; Sega Saturn
- Release: Original version: JP: December 22, 1994; Kaimaku-ban: JP: July 14, 1995 (PS); JP: July 28, 1995 (SS)
- Genres: Sports (baseball)
- Modes: Single-player, multiplayer

Jikkyō Powerful Pro Yakyū '95 (Note: Japanese: 実況パワフルプロ野球'95, Hepburn: Jikkyō Pawafuru Puro Yakyū '95; "Live Powerful Pro Baseball") is a sports video game developed by Baseball Contents Production and published by Konami for the PlayStation in Japan in 1994. The game is a port of the first entry in the Power Pros series, which was released on the Super Famicom earlier that year.

An updated version titled Jikkyō Powerful Pro Yakyū '95 Kaimaku-ban (Note: Japanese: 実況パワフルプロ野球'95開幕版, Hepburn: Jikkyō Pawafuru Puro Yakyū '95 Kaimaku-ban; "Live Powerful Pro Baseball Opening Edition") was released for the PlayStation and Sega Saturn in 1995.

== Gameplay ==
Jikkyō Powerful Pro Yakyū '95 is a Japanese baseball game featuring players with oversized heads.

== Reception ==
Reception

Review scores
Publication	Score
Famitsu	8/10, 8/10, 8/10, 7/10 (SAT)
Next Generation	1/5 (PS)
Sega Saturn Magazine	21/30 (SAT)
Super GamePower	4/5 (PS)
Ultimate Future Games	47% (SAT)
Ultimate Gamer	6/10 (SAT)

The Japanese Sega Saturn Magazine rated the Saturn version 21 out of 30. Next Generation reviewed the PlayStation version of the game as "Power Baseball", rating it one star out of five, and criticized its "average" gameplay and the graphics.
