= Anticipation (video game) =

1988 video game

- North American cover art
- Developer: Rare
- Publisher: Nintendo
- Composer: David Wise
- Platform: Nintendo Entertainment System
- Release: NA: December 1988; EU: 25 October 1989
- Genre: Board game
- Modes: Single-player, multiplayer

Anticipation is a video board game developed by Rare and released by Nintendo for the Nintendo Entertainment System (NES) in 1988. It is playable in either single-player or multiplayer mode, with up to four players competing against each other and/or computer-controlled opponents.

== Gameplay ==
Example of a drawing puzzle, to which the answer is "top hat"

Before the game begins, the number of human and computer players must be chosen, as well as the difficulty setting. There must always be at least one human player, and the total number of players (human plus computer opponents) can be no more than four. Players use the controllers to buzz in during the game; if more than two players are competing, they may double up on two controllers. Anticipation is not compatible with the NES Four Score and Satellite multiplayer adapters.

Anticipation combines gameplay elements from Pictionary and Trivial Pursuit board games. The player is represented by one of four game pieces on a board: a pair of pink high-heeled shoes, a bugle, an ice cream cone, and a teddy bear. The game slowly draws a picture, and the first person to buzz in may try to guess it. A die counts down from six to zero while the picture is being drawn. As soon as a player buzzes in, the die and the drawing both freeze and the player has 25 seconds to spell out the answer. Making two mistakes, or running out of time, locks the player out; the drawing and the die countdown both resume, and the other players can then buzz in.

Four categories are in play per level, each corresponding to one of the four colors on the board (blue, green, pink, yellow). Correctly solving a puzzle credits the player with its color and moves his/her token by the number of spaces shown on the die; the next puzzle is played in the category for the color on which it lands. If no one solves a puzzle, a new one is played in the same color. Once a player has collected all four colors on a level, the token rises to the next higher level. The first player to complete every level wins the game.

There are three levels on the Easy and Medium difficulty settings, and four on the Hard and Very Hard settings. From the third level on, the board includes gray "Feature Squares." Landing on one of these causes the player's token to fly around the board until a button is pressed; a puzzle is then played in the color that was hit. The fourth level has the same layout as the third, but with several "Drop-Out Squares," or gaps where spaces have been removed. Landing on a Drop-Out Square causes the player to fall back down to the corresponding position on the third level, but he/she retains credit for the colors of any solved fourth-level puzzles and must collect the others to climb back up.

=== Difficulty settings ===
On the easier difficulty settings, the players are initially shown a pattern of dots, which the game slowly connects to draw the picture. The category is shown on-screen, and a string of blanks is displayed to indicate the number of words and letters in the correct answer. These aids are gradually eliminated on the higher-level boards, and are not present at all on the harder difficulty settings.

== Sources ==
- Scullion, Chris (2019). The NES Encyclopedia: Every Game Released for the Nintendo Entertainment System. Havertown: White Owl. ISBN 9781526737793.
