= Hwang Shinwei =

Taiwanese video game programmer

- Occupation: Video game programmer
- Years active: 1988–1991
- Known for: Magic Jewelry

Hwang Shinwei (Chinese: 黃信維; pinyin: Huángxìnwéi), sometimes romanized as Huang Hsin-Wei or Huang Xinwei, is a Taiwanese video game programmer. From 1988 to 1991, he developed video games for the NES without a license from Nintendo, which were mostly published by RCM Co., Ltd. (also known as RCM Group or simply RCM, standing for RamCo Man International (Chinese: 劍虹國際有限公司)). Though some of Hwang's titles are originals. most are clones of popular games, many of which were not originally ported to the NES (such as Rally-X). All of these games were released on various multicarts, but several, like Brush Roller and Magic Jewelry, were also released on standalone cartridge format. Though standalone games and multicarts produced by RCM and other companies with ties to Hwang often had copyright information listed, cartridges produced by unrelated companies usually had their copyright information removed, even on single release cartridges. Hwang retired from NES game development around 1991, coinciding with a Nintendo lawsuit against several Taiwanese companies (including RCM) for their counterfeiting activities. It is possible he may have been arrested, though whether or not this is true is unclear.

== List of Hwang Shinwei games ==
=== Clone titles ===
No.	Title	Release year(s)	Original publisher(s)	Clone of	Notes
1	Mí Hún Chē	1988	Chi Chi Toy Co.	Rally-X	Also known as Ecstasy Car. Also credited as The Latest Strong Card: Ecstasy Car (Zuìxīn Qiáng Kǎ - Mí Hún Chē) on the cartridge.
2	3D Block	1989/1990	Jujing Electronics (1989); RCM Group (1990)	Blockout	Credited as Three-Dimensional Tetris (Lìtǐ Èluósī Fāngkuài) on the cartridge.
3	Block Force	1990	Jujing Electronics; RCM Group	Block Hole	Credited as Square Force on the cartridge. Originally programmed by Hwang Jiun-Ming, Shinwei in this game is credited as "layout and music".
4	Brush Roller	1990	Various publishers	Crush Roller	Its hack version was developed by NTDEC as Bookyman in 1991, and later included in their 1992 multicart Caltron 6 in 1.
5	F18 Race	1990	RCM Group	Grand Prix	Also known as X1 Race.
6	Frog River	1990	RCM Group	Frogger	
7	Magic Jewelry	1990	RCM Group	Columns	Also credited as Magic Gems (Mófǎ Bǎoshí) on the cartridge.
8	BB Car	1991	RCM Group; JY Company	Rally-X	Credited as Super Car on the cartridge. A new version of the original 1988 game Mí Hún Chē.
9	Boat Race	1991	Self-published		
10	Magic Jewelry II	1991	RCM Group	Columns'	Also credited as Gemstone Second Generation (Bǎoshí Fāngkuài Èr Dài) on the cartridge. The only sequel to Magic Jewelry.
11	Wild Ball	1991	RCM Group	Emi-chan no Moero Yakyūken!	Credited as Magic Giral on the cartridge, and Baseball Boxing (Yěqiú Quán) in the game, the latter a literal translation of the Japanese term.
12	Face Tetris	Unknown	Unknown	Faces	

=== Original titles ===
No.	Title	Release year	Original publisher	Notes
1	Guess Numbers	1990	RCM Group	Both these Puzzle games use graphics taken from Adventure Island.
2	Picture Collect	1990	RCM Group	Both these Puzzle games use graphics taken from Adventure Island.
3	Punch Sprite	1990	Self-published	Also known as Punch Pipe. A Whack-a-mole game with graphics taken from Super Mario Bros..
4	Soha Poker	1990	Unknown	A Poker-based game.
5	Sky Shot	1990	RCM Group	
6	2 Turn Pair	1991	RCM Group	A Shisen-Sho-based game.
7	Memory Pair	1991	RCM Group	A Concentration solitaire game.
8	China Chess	Unknown	Unknown	A Banqi-based game.
9	Black Jack	Unknown	Unknown	Based on the homonym card game.
10	Magic Sound	Unknown	Unknown	
11	Piano	Unknown	Unknown	A Piano simulator game.

=== Multi-game cartridges ===
No.	Title	Original publisher	Release year	Notes
1	Tetris Family: 6-in-1	RCM Group	1991	1) Credited as Block Family on title screen. 2) Contains: Tetris, Tetris, 3D Block, Flipull, Magic Jewelry, and Block Force.
2	Tetris Family: 9-in-1	RCM Group	1991	1) Credited as Tetris Series: Super 9 in One on title screen. 2) Contains: Tetris (BPS/Nintendo), Tetris (Atari), 3D Block, Flipull, Block Force, Magic Jewelry, Wild Ball, 2 Turn Pair, and Memory Pair.
3	Tetris Family: 12-in-1	RCM Group	1991	
4	12-in-1 Hwang Shinwei	Unknown	Unknown	Contains: Magic Jewelry, Tengen Tetris (credited as Tetris II), Chinese Chess, Dr. Mario, Taiwan Mahjong 16 (credited as Taiwan Mahjon), Gomoku Narabe Renju (credited as Five Chess), Block Force, Hayauchi Super Igo (credited as Chess), Arkanoid (credited as Super Arkanoid), Flipull, Super Mario Bros. (credited as Super Mario II), and Tank 1990.
