= Make Trax =

1981 video game

- North American flyer
- Developer: Alpha Denshi
- Publishers: JP: Kural Samno Electric; EU: Exidy; NA: Williams Electronics
- Platform: Arcade
- Release: NA/JP: October 1981; EU: 1981
- Genre: Maze
- Modes: Single-player, multiplayer

Make Trax, originally released in Japan as Crush Roller (クラッシュローラー, Kurasshu Rōrā), is a 1981 maze game developed by Alpha Denshi and published as an arcade video game by Kural Samno Electric in Japan. It was licensed in Europe to Exidy, which released it under its original title Crush Roller, and in North America to Williams Electronics, who released it as Make Trax.

== Gameplay ==
The goal is to paint the entire maze green.

The player controls a paintbrush, reddish-orange in color, and must paint the entire maze in order to advance to the next stage. Two fish — one yellow, the other light blue — emerge from separate aquariums to pursue the paintbrush around the board, and if either of the fish succeeds in making contact with the paintbrush, the player loses one of three lives.

The player may use two "rollers" to attack the fish. They are located on overpasses, one vertical in its orientation, the other horizontal. To use them, the player positions the paintbrush on its forward end, waits for either or both of the fish to approach, then pushes the paintbrush along the roller, attacking the fish. The fish is removed from the maze for a few seconds, then returns to one of the aquariums and resumes its pursuit of the paintbrush. Killing fish in this manner scores bonus points.

The fish initially are dumb, but as time goes on they get "smarter" learning to avoid the roller when the paintbrush nears it, and develop strategies to trap the player between them.

A third character, appearing to be an animal, rolling tire, or invisible man depending on the level, may enter the maze and leave tracks that must be painted over in order for the board to be completed. The player can limit the damage by running over the figure, which not only stops further tracks from being left but also awards the player a score, which progressively increases as more boards are cleared.

== Reception ==
In Japan, Crush Roller was the ninth highest-grossing arcade game of 1981.

== Legacy ==
ADK remade the game for the Neo Geo Pocket Color which was released worldwide by SNK under its original name Crush Roller in 1999. The game mechanics are largely the same as its arcade counterpart, though the level design was adapted to fit the smaller screen size. Graphics and sound were also improved thanks to the more powerful hardware. This version was later re-released as part of the Windows port of Neo Geo Pocket Color Selection Vol. 1 in 2021.

A clone called Brush Roller for the Famicom/NES was programmed in 1990 by Hwang Shinwei and published by RCM Group. This game was later hacked by NTDEC to make Bookyman, which was released on the Caltron 6-in-1 and the Asder 20-in-1. It replaced the title screen, some of the graphics, and revamped the sound and music. It also fixed the bugs that cause music temporary stops when the roller died or crush enemy and eliminated corrupted sprites at left maze scoreboard when completed stage which are replaced by some hollow squares. The original NTDEC release and Asder version retained the original sounds from Brush Roller, despite the Asder version released a year later.

A "speed-up" modification named Make Trax Turbo allows the paintbrush to move faster (but not the fish).
