= Kōshien (series) =

- Cover art of 98 Kōshien, the second title for the PlayStation
- Genre: Sports
- Developers: Affect? Magical Company (Mahou)
- Publishers: K Amusement Leasing; Magical Company (Mahou)

Kōshien (甲子園) is a series of high school baseball-themed video games, released in Japan. The first two titles were released by K Amusement Leasing for the Family Computer and Super Famicom. The characters are based on real athletes.

== Games ==
The following is a list of games released in the series.

Japanese title	English title	Platform	Year
甲子園	Kōshien^{[b]}	Family Computer	October 6, 1989
甲子園2	Kōshien 2	Super Famicom	June 26, 1992
甲子園3	Kōshien 3	Super Famicom	July 29, 1994
甲子園4	Kōshien 4	Super Famicom	July 14, 1995
甲子園V	Kōshien V	PlayStation	May 16, 1997
'98甲子園	98 Kōshien	PlayStation	June 18, 1998
'99甲子園	99 Kōshien	PlayStation	June 17, 1999
激突甲子園	Gekitotsu Kōshien	Sega Saturn	August 1, 1997
甲子園ポケット	Kōshien Pocket	Game Boy Color	March 12, 1999
マジカルスポーツ 2000甲子園	Magical Sports 2000 Kōshien	PlayStation 2	August 10, 2000
マジカルスポーツ 2001甲子園	Magical Sports 2001 Kōshien^{[a]}	PlayStation 2	May 31, 2001
甲子園 紺碧の空	Kōshien: Konpeki no Sora	PlayStation 2	February 14, 2002
甲子園	Kōshien^{[c]}	Mobile phone	2005

- ^{a} Released in 2004 by Midas Interactive Entertainment in Europe as League Series Baseball 2.
- ^{b} In North America, it was released for the Nintendo Entertainment System as Little League Baseball: Championship Series.
- ^{c} Started broadcasting in 2005, produced in collaboration with G-Mode.
