= Sqoon =

1986 video game

- North American box art
- Developer(s): Home Data
- Publisher(s): Irem
- Platform(s): Nintendo Entertainment System
- Release: JP: 26 June 1986; NA: September 1987
- Genre(s): Shoot 'em up
- Mode(s): Single-player

Sqoon (スクーン, Sukūn) is a 1986 side-scrolling shooter game by Irem for the Nintendo Entertainment System. Although published in North America directly by Irem itself, distribution of the game in that region and technical support were handled by Broderbund.

== Plot ==
Aliens who rule the planet Neptune realize that they have run out of their primary source of nutrition, "man-ham livestock", and decide to invade Earth to feed off the humans. They melt the polar ice caps, causing entire continents to sink under the ocean. The General of the Earth Defense Army begs a pirate called Narikeen to strike back at the aliens with his submarine, Sqoon. Narikeen, being of an evil nature, laughs at the pleas of the general, but reluctantly agrees to exterminate the aliens.

== Gameplay ==
Sqoon gameplay. The player must attempt to destroy facilities like the one shown to rescue humans.

The player is given Sqoon, a pink submarine, and must use it to destroy the aliens and rescue captured human survivors while trying to avoid coming into contact with enemies and running out of fuel. To accomplish this, Sqoon is equipped with missiles to attack enemies, and an ice ball bomb attack to destroy facilities and release captured humans. When Sqoon has reached its maximum capacity of nine humans, the player must discharge survivors onto an island which will then release power-ups and replenish fuel. Sqoon has a fuel supply which must be replenished every sixty seconds. Failure to do so results in the loss of a life.

== Adaptation ==
- Sqoon was adapted on chapter 5 of the manga Shape of Happiness.

== See also ==
- In the Hunt
