= MLB Power Pros =

2007 video game

- North American Wii box art
- Developer: Baseball Contents Production
- Publishers: 2K (North America); Konami (Japan)
- Series: Power Pros
- Platforms: PlayStation 2, Wii
- Release: NA: October 1, 2007; JP: October 4, 2007
- Genre: Sports
- Mode: Single-player

MLB Power Pros, also known in Japan as Jikkyou Powerful Major League 2 (実況パワフルメジャーリーグ2), is a baseball video game developed by Baseball Contents Production and published by 2K in North America and Konami in Japan for the Wii and PlayStation 2 video game consoles. It is part of the traditionally Japan-only Power Pros series of video games, and is the first game in the series to be released outside Japan. It is the sequel to Jikkyou Powerful Pro Major League which was released only in Japan for the GameCube and PlayStation 2. It was released in October 2007, and is published by 2K. A sequel, MLB Power Pros 2008, came out in 2008. Another sequel, MLB Power Pros 2010, came out on iOS and Android devices in 2010.

== Gameplay ==
Gameplay in MLB Power Pros features "easy pick-up and play mechanics". The game contains over a dozen gameplay modes, including a Season Mode and a Success Mode. Within the former, the player takes the role of a General Manager of a Major League Baseball team, with the goal of winning the World Series. The player has control over all the aspects of the team, including training players, purchasing better equipment, and trading players between teams. Maximum playtime is 10 years, or when the team points run out and the player loses (game over).

=== Exhibition mode ===
In this mode, players may play a baseball game against a Major League team. There are options for a day game or night game, number of innings, what stadium to play at, lineup selection etc. Players may also play exhibition mode with two players, or can watch a game against two teams with the computer controlling both teams and take the role of a spectator.

=== Success mode ===
The story-based Success Mode, which has been a regular element in the Japanese series (main series) since the third release, mixes traditional role playing elements with baseball scenarios, following the player's character as he starts from a college baseball player with the goal of becoming a Major League player. The player will train their character in numerous games while dealing with other social situations such as the character's academics, teammate Marvin, and gaining a part-time job. Unlike the Japanese installments, My Life mode is not included in this installment, but it has an ability editor which Japanese version never had, due to the importance and popularity of Success Mode in Japan.

The character has three years to impress a scout to make it to the minor leagues. The player must have to improve the character by practicing, studying, earning money in a part-time job, dating, and playing baseball games. The character can play any position such as a starting pitcher, reliever, closer, or fielder. Also, the player is given Fate Cards to make a decision. These cards are "yes", "no", "challenge", or "Marvin".

=== Season mode ===
In season mode, the player plays a General Manager (GM) for ten years (game time), unless the player runs out of money by the beginning of the year.

The player begins by choosing Major League mode or Expansion Mode. Major League mode is the 30 major league teams only, Expansion mode is 2 teams and the 30 major league teams. The 2 teams are teams which the player can create and customize, including creating their uniform, team name, etc.

Dream Draft allows the player to do a fantasy draft of the current roster. The draft uses a snake draft order where the player is awarded the first overall pick and can't be changed.

The player's main goal is to win the World Series.

The player can also trade players, play games (or fast forward them) and more. After each season, the player can try to negotiate contracts with their team. There is also Spring Training where the team can learn new skills (new pitches, etc.) and develop previously taught skills faster.

=== Arrange Team ===
Player can create their own fantasy team and/or fill it with their own created players, but in order to use an arrange team in season mode, the player must complete Success mode at least once and earn 100,000 in game shop points. This usually requires several days to several weeks of gameplay.

=== Wii Remote and Home Run Derby mode ===
The player can use the Wii Remote to play an Exhibition game or play Home Run Derby. In Home Run Derby, the player tries to hit home runs with any playable character (including pitchers) at any stadium in 10 swings. If the player hits a home run on every one of those 10 swings, the game continues with extra swings until the player gets out. The player can try to beat previous high scores. The high score includes how many home runs were hit, the distance traveled, etc. The player can also choose the difficulty. The same rules apply for the mode Home Run Derby, but the Wii Remote is not used to swing. The same rules also apply to the Exhibition game using the Wii Remote; the rules are found under the Exhibition Mode heading.

== Game appearances ==
Every Major League Baseball (MLB) player is recreated within MLB Power Pros. Every MLB player is also represented in traditional Power Pro style: a short character with a large head and detached feet. Further appearance customization can be made in American version, including hair and facial hair, while in the Japanese version characters are all in traditional style other than skin color. In the Wii version, players are able to use Miis within the game.

Like other MLB games, there are some players that are not in the game although they played during the 2006 MLB season: players not in the MLBPA cannot be put into the game without negotiating with the players themselves. Instead of Barry Bonds, the game contains "Great Gonzales" and several other "Great" players as replacements because they are not part of the association. They do not have the same season numbers, stats, or appearances, but they do retain the same age and similar abilities so as to stay true to the player they are replacing.

In-game commentary is provided by Jack Merluzzi in English and Naoki Kawaji in Japanese.

== Cover ==
The cover features six then-MLB stars represented in the series' cartoonish style: Seattle Mariners outfielder Ichiro Suzuki, Boston Red Sox starting pitcher Daisuke Matsuzaka and Los Angeles Angels outfielder Vladimir Guerrero in front, and Philadelphia Phillies first baseman Ryan Howard, Detroit Tigers catcher Iván Rodríguez and New York Yankees third baseman Alex Rodriguez at the back.

== Reception ==
Reception

Aggregate score
Aggregator	Score	
Aggregator	PS2	Wii
Metacritic	80/100	83/100

Review scores
Publication	Score	
Publication	PS2	Wii
1Up.com	A−	A−
Famitsu	30/40	30/40
GameSpot	8/10	8/10
GameSpy	4/5	4/5
GameZone	7.8/10	N/A
IGN	8.4/10	8.4/10
Nintendo Power	N/A	6.5/10
PlayStation: The Official Magazine	3.5/5	N/A

The game received "favorable" reviews on both platforms according to the review aggregation website Metacritic. In Japan, Famitsu gave it a score of two eights and two sevens for a total of 30 out of 40.
