= Bird Week =

1986 video game

- Developer(s): Lenar
- Publisher(s): Toshiba EMI
- Platform(s): Family Computer
- Release: JP: June 3, 1986
- Genre(s): Action
- Mode(s): Single-player

Bird Week (バード・ウィーク, Bādo Uīku) is a single-player action video game released for the Nintendo Family Computer.

== Gameplay ==
Mother bird is looking for butterflies to feed her baby birds with.

The player plays as a bird and can either play the normal game or the single level practice game. The player must feed butterflies to the baby birds so that they can grow and eventually leave the nest. The game has no end sequence: beyond level 999, it simply repeats levels until the player loses all of their lives.

Each level represents a different season of the year, beginning in early spring and then progressing through summer and autumn before repeating to the following spring. If the proper number of butterflies are not fed to the babies, then the babies end up starving to death. The player loses a life by failing to feed a baby bird, or by being caught by predators and other obstacles.
