= Caltron 6 in 1 =

1992 video game

- Developer(s): Caltron Industries
- Publisher(s): NA: Caltron; NA: Myriad; AU: HES; BRA: Dynacom; WW: NTDEC
- Programmer(s): Shao Hwa Chiou
- Composer(s): "Martino", "Ruth"
- Platform(s): NES
- Release: 1992
- Genre(s): Various
- Mode(s): Single-player

Caltron 6 in 1 is a multicart developed and published in 1992 for the NES in North America by Caltron Industries, Inc. (credited as Caltron Ind. Inc.), a Taiwan-based video game company which was either closely related to, or simply a pseudonym for, NTDEC. In Australia, it was published under the title Real Player‘s Pak by HES. Dynacom released the cartridge as Multi Ação 6-in-1 for the Brazilian market. All the featured games, except Porter, were released as single game cartridges in Spain by Gluk Video.

As its title suggests, 6 in 1 consists of six different games in various genres, which mostly are popular clones of the era. It is composed of: Cosmos Cop, Adam & Eve, Magic Carpet 1001, Balloon Monster, Porter, and Bookyman. These titles were all previously released as stand-alone Famicom format by NTDEC, often under their U.S. brand Mega Soft.

The compilation has received poor reviews, with one reviewer claiming that all six games on the multicart are "uniformly awful [and] barely first-generation NES quality", even though they are more playable and are of "much higher quality" than other unlicensed video game compilations, specifically citing Active Enterprises' infamous Action 52 as the comparative example.

== Games ==
- Cosmos Cop is a pseudo-3D into-the-screen shoot 'em up similar to Sega's Space Harrier. However, the game experiences a lot of image breakup on the screen due to the NES's limited capability of handling first-person scaling.
- Magic Carpet 1001 is a horizontal scrolling shooter that was later released on pirate cartridges as Aladdin III, and with some graphical and sound modifications as Super Harry Potter. Besides being the only original title on the cartridge, it has been criticized for its steep difficulty curve.
- Balloon Monster is a clone of Mitchell's arcade game Pang (Buster Bros. in North America).
- Adam & Eve is a single-screen platform game similar to Balloon Fight by Nintendo (itself based on Joust by Williams Electronics), in which the player has to kill snakes by bursting the balloons attached to their heads. It also received criticism in that had very little relevance to the homonym biblical story.
- Porter is a puzzle video game similar to Thinking Rabbit's Sokoban and Boxxle (the first was created by Hiroyuki Imabayashi), where the player has to move boxes into specifically–marked places. Criticized for its controls; boxes can only be moved while holding down the A button, and if the B button is accidentally pressed, the level automatically restarts without any warning to the player.
- Bookyman is a direct Brush Roller hack, the clone of another arcade game: Alpha Denshi's Crush Roller (Make Trax in North America and Europe), programmed by Hwang Shinwei in 1990. Both were considered inferior to their arcade counterpart.

== Myriad version ==
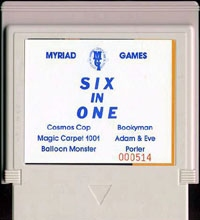
Myriad 6 in 1 cartridge

When Caltron Industries, Inc. was going out of business, a company based in Kingwood, Texas named Myriad Games, Inc., bought all of their existing inventory of tan cartridges. Myriad then took the carts and added a very generic (no graphic art) label. They were then packaged in custom boxes with a folded manual. Each Myriad cart and box were numbered individually.

Myriad's only change to Caltron's product was to replace the label with their own. In fact, the edges of the Caltron label are still visible, as the Myriad label is slightly too small to cover it. No programming changes were done, hence the game is exactly the same, including the title screen which still reads "Caltron". The six games on the cart are identical to Caltron's release.

Shortly after the release of 6 in 1, Myriad went out of business for unknown reasons. The game has become one of the rarest unlicensed games made for the NES. Collectors speculate that fewer than 100 copies of this game still exist, and even fewer are complete. The most valuable copies of the game are those with the box, instructions and cartridge with matching serial numbers. The lowest known serial number is 000003 and the highest is 000888. At least two sealed versions are known to exist.
