= Sky Destroyer =

1985 video game

- Famicom cover art
- Developer: Home Data
- Publisher: Taito
- Platforms: Arcade, Family Computer
- Release: Famicom: JP: November 14, 1985
- Genre: Rail shooter
- Mode: Single-player

Sky Destroyer (スカイデストロイヤー, Sukai Desutoroiyā) is a rail shooter video game released by Taito in 1985 as an arcade game as well as for the Family Computer. Controlling a Japanese World War II monoplane, the player assumes the role of the pilot of the respective naval aircraft who is required to destroy enemies to clear stages.

== Gameplay ==
The player is about to destroy a submarine.

In Sky Destroyer, the player controls a plane, equipped with machine guns and torpedoes, both of which have unlimited ammunition.

The color of the sky changes according to the time of the day (afternoon, evening, night). F6F Hellcats (F4U Corsairs in the Arcade Version) are common enemy fighter planes the player will encounter. Occasionally, the player would run into a B-24 bomber and has to shoot each of its four engines before the B-24 flies away. Sometimes when player has shot down a number of B-24s, they would encounter a falling satellite across the screen. A high number of points would be rewarded if the satellite gets destroyed. There are bonus stages in this game.

Enemy resistance comes not only from the air, but from land and sea as well. An American naval destroyer or submarine will occasionally try to down the player's plane with anti-aircraft fire. Aircraft carriers can sometimes be seen in the distant horizon but can still be sunk with torpedoes. At the end of a stage, the player faces a mobile shore battery on an island. This battery must be destroyed in order to complete the mission. If the player is hit by enemy fire, his plane crashes and he loses one a life. The game is over when all lives are used up.

== Reception ==
In Japan, Game Machine listed Sky Destroyer on their December 15, 1985 issue as being the third most-successful table arcade unit of the month.
