= Tennis (1984 video game) =

1984 video game

- North American NES box art
- Developers: Nintendo R&D1; Intelligent Systems
- Publisher: Nintendo: JP: Hudson Soft (PC-88, Sharp X1, MZ-1500)
- Producer: Masayuki Uemura
- Designer: Shigeru Miyamoto
- Programmer: Kenji Nakajima
- Artist: Shigeru Miyamoto
- Composer: Yukio Kaneoka
- Platform: Nintendo Entertainment System: Arcade, PC-88, Sharp X1, PC-8001mkII, MZ-1500, Famicom Disk System, Game Boy, Nintendo e-Reader
- Release: January 14, 1984: NES; JP: January 14, 1984; NA: October 18, 1985; EU: September 1, 1986 Arcade (Vs. Tennis); JP: January 18, 1984; NA: March 1984; EU: 1986 PC-88; JP: June 1985 X1; JP: 1985 MZ-1500; JP: 1985 Famicom Disk System; JP: February 21, 1986 Game Boy; JP: May 29, 1989; NA: July 31, 1989; PAL: 1990 e-Reader; NA: September 16, 2002
- Genre: Sports (tennis)
- Modes: Single-player, multiplayer
- Arcade system: Nintendo VS. System, PlayChoice-10

Tennis (Note: Japanese: テニス, Hepburn: Tenisu) is a 1984 tennis video game developed and published by Nintendo for the Nintendo Entertainment System. It was originally released in Japan for the Family Computer on January 14, 1984, a few months after the launch of the Famicom on July 15, 1983. An arcade version titled VS. Tennis released for the Nintendo VS. System the same year, becoming a hit at Japanese and American arcades that year; it was the sixth top-performing arcade game of 1984 in the United States. Tennis is one of 17 launch games for the console in North America and Europe. It was also ported to the Game Boy in 1989, going on sale about a month after the launch of the handheld console in Japan, and becoming one of the five launch titles for North America.

== Gameplay ==
Tennis features single-player and two-player modes for singles and doubles matches, with either competitive or cooperative gameplay. A computerized opponent's artificial intelligence can be set to one of five difficulty levels. Mario is the official. Unlike other tennis video games, the singles mode puts one player against the AI and the doubles mode puts two human players on the same team against two AI opponents, it is not possible to do 2 player singles, 1 player doubles, or 2 player doubles on separate teams.

== Development and release ==
In 1983, the Famicom had only three launch games, and its library would total seven, including Tennis. Shigeru Miyamoto said he was "directly in charge of the character design and the game design". The game was developed in 1983.

In 1984, it was included in the Nintendo VS. System arcade game series under the name Vs. Tennis, (Note: Japanese: VS. テニス, Hepburn: Bāsasu Tenisu) which was released in Japan on January 18, 1984. In 1985, Hudson Soft published Tennis for the PC-8801. It was re-released for the North American launch of the Nintendo Entertainment System in October 1985. Nintendo ported the game to the Game Boy in 1989, and to the Nintendo e-Reader in 2002.

The NES version is embedded in the life simulation game Animal Crossing (2001), and in the party video game WarioWare: Twisted! (2004) as one of 9-Volt's minigames. It was also released for the Virtual Console for the Wii in 2006 and the Wii U in 2013 and the Game Boy version to the Nintendo 3DS in 2011. This version was added to the Nintendo Classics service in late 2018. The arcade version was released by Hamster Corporation as part of their Arcade Archives series for the Nintendo Switch in December 2020.

== Reception ==
In Japan, Game Machine listed VS. Tennis in its March 15, 1984 issue as the most successful table arcade cabinet of the month. It again topped the Game Machine table arcade game charts in April and May 1984. In the United States, Vs. Tennis topped the arcade software conversion kit charts of RePlay (July 1984) and Play Meter (August 1984). It became the sixth top-performing arcade game of 1984 in the United States. In Europe, it had become a popular arcade game by 1986.

== See also ==
- Jimmy Connors Tennis (1993)
- Super Tennis (1991)
- Top Players' Tennis (1990)
