= Battle City =

1985 video game

- Famicom box art
- Developer: Namco
- Publisher: Namco
- Producer: Takefumi Hyoudou
- Programmer: Ryoichi Ohkubo
- Composer: Junko Ozawa
- Platforms: Family Computer, Game Boy, Arcade, X1, FM-7, MZ-1500
- Release: JP: September 9, 1985
- Genre: Multidirectional shooter
- Modes: Single-player, multiplayer
- Arcade system: Nintendo VS. System

Battle City (Note: Japanese: バトルシティー, Hepburn: Batoru Shitī) is a 1985 multidirectional shooter video game developed and published by Namco for the Family Computer. Released only in Japan, it is the sequel to the arcade video game Tank Battalion.

An arcade version for the Nintendo VS. System, titled VS. Battle City, would follow, along with a Game Boy version in 1991, which was developed and published by Nova Games. The Famicom version was later included as an unlockable in the Japanese release of Star Fox: Assault, and would eventually be digitally re-released via the Virtual Console for Wii and Wii U. Hamster Corporation released the arcade version as part of their Arcade Archives series for the Nintendo Switch and PlayStation 4 on September 12, 2024.

Although the Famicom version was never officially released outside Japan, Battle City was one of the most common inclusions in unofficial famiclone multicarts.

== Gameplay ==
The player controls a tank and shoot projectiles to destroy enemy tanks around the playfield. The enemy tanks enter from the top of the screen and attempt to destroy the player's base (represented on the screen as a phoenix symbol), as well as the player's tank itself. A level is completed when the player destroys 20 enemy tanks, but the game ends if the player's base is destroyed or the player loses all available lives. Note that the player can destroy the base as well, so the player can still lose even after all enemy tanks are destroyed.

Battle City contains 35 different stages that are 13 units wide by 13 units high. Each map contains different types of terrain and obstacles. Examples include brick walls that can be destroyed by having either the player's tank or an enemy tank shoot at them, steel walls that can be destroyed by the player if they have collected three stars, bushes that hide tanks under them, ice fields that make it difficult to control the tank and patches of water which cannot be crossed by tanks. The game becomes more challenging in later levels, as enemy tanks may act as decoys to lure players away from their base so that another tank can destroy it. In addition, flashing red tanks releases a random power-up when destroyed. There are several types of power-ups, such as a clock that stops all enemies, a protective shield, and a bomb that eliminates all on-screen enemies. The enemy tanks come in four different sizes, with the largest one requiring four shots to destroy.

The original Famicom version of Battle City provides a co-op multiplayer mode and a built-in level editor, one of the earliest video games to do so. Due to its simplicity, Battle City hosts an extensive ROM hacking scene.

== Reception ==
Reception

Review scores
Publication	Score
Famitsu	24/40
PlayStation Magazine (JP)	18.1/30
