= Famiclone =

Hardware clones of the NES home video game console

In video game parlance, a famiclone (portmanteau of Famicom and clone) is a hardware clone of the Family Computer/Nintendo Entertainment System. They are designed to replicate the workings of, and play games designed for, the Famicom and NES. Hundreds of unauthorized clones have been made available since the height of the NES popularity in the late 1980s. The technology employed in such clones has evolved over the years: while the earliest clones feature a printed circuit board containing custom or third party integrated circuits (ICs), more recent (post-1996) clones utilize single-chip designs, with a custom ASIC which simulates the functionality of the original hardware and often includes one or more on-board games. Most devices originate in China and Taiwan, and less commonly South Korea. Outside China and Taiwan, they are mostly widespread across emerging markets of developing countries.

In some locales, such as former Eastern Bloc, former Soviet countries (especially Russia), South America, Middle East, several Asian countries and Africa such systems could occasionally be found side by side with official Nintendo hardware, but clones were cheaper and had wider availability of software so such clones were the easiest available console gaming systems. Elsewhere, these systems often prompted swift legal action. Many of these early systems were similar to the NES or Famicom not only in functionality, but also in appearance, often featuring little more than a new name and logo in place of Nintendo's branding. In contrast, in the former Yugoslavia NES clones often visually resembled the Mega Drive, complete with the Sega logo.

Few of these systems were openly marketed as "NES compatible". Some manufacturers opt describing the system generically as a "TV game", "8-bit console", "multi-game system", or "Plug & Play", but even these examples generally say nothing to suggest any compatibility with NES hardware. They would often be distributed along with pirate cartridges containing several different video games, known as multicarts.

== History ==
=== Origins and early clones ===
Around 1987, Taiwanese tech companies successfully reverse-engineered Nintendo’s custom CPU and Picture Processing Unit. Early clone pioneers like Songtly, Bit Corporation, and TSE began manufacturing hardware that used discrete, third-party integrated circuits.

=== Expansion and regional legends ===
In 1992, a company named Steepler launched Dendy, this elephant-branded console became a massive cultural phenomenon. It practically invented the Russian video game market. The Pegasus (Poland/Balkans): became the gold standard in Central Europe, packaged alongside pirated multi-game cartridges. The Terminator 2 (Asia/Easter Europe/Africa/Latin America): Designed to look like a Sega Mega Drive but housing 8-bit Famicom hardware, the Ending Man "Terminator" series became one of the most widely distributed clones in history. The Phantom System & Dynavision (Brazil): Local manufacturing laws barred imports, leading prominent Brazilian firms like Gradiente to build high-profile unlicensed clones that explicitly mimicked Western NES styling. The Micro Genius (Southeast Asia/Africa/Middle East): Produced in Taiwan, these were highly durable clones that frequently beat official hardware to market in developing regions.

=== The NES-on-a-chip ===
By the mid-1990s, engineers compressed the entire motherboard circuitry into a single, cheap Application-Specific integrated Circuit (ASIC). These systems were easily identified by a drop of black epoxy resin (a "glop-top") covering the microchip directly on the circuit board. The cheapness of "NES-on-a-Chip" (NOAC) allowed manufacturers to shove Famiclones into bizarre form factors. These included fake PlayStation shells (PolyStation), functional computer keyboards designed for "educational" use, and N64/Dreamcast controllers that plugged directly into a TV. Clones relied heavily on multi-carts boasting absurd claims like "999,999-in-1". These cartridges usually contained only a dozen classic titles (like Super Mario Bros., Contra, and Duck Hunt) repeated with minor palette swaps or gameplay hacks.

=== Legality and the modern era ===
During their peak, many consumers bought Famiclones entirely unaware they were purchasing counterfeit products. Nintendo launched countless copyright lawsuits, successfully shutting down several prominent manufacturers over the years. However, as Nintendo's original 1980s hardware patents began expiring in the 2000s, the raw hardware cloning of the NES became legal. Today, the spiritual descendants of Famiclones exist as legal retro-consoles (like Hyperkin systems) or cheap "plug-and-play" handhelds found in modern retail stores.

== Types ==
Because NES clones are not officially licensed, they vary in areas such as hardware quality, available games and overall performance. Most clones are produced extremely cheaply, while a few are comparable to first-party hardware in their manufacture quality. In terms of appearance and basic build, there are four general types of clones:

=== Console type ===
Many clones are designed to resemble the original Famicom, but others have been produced to look like almost all other consoles from the NES, SNES, and Mega Drive/Genesis to the Xbox and PlayStation 3, and others simply in a generic console shape. Usually, it is easy to tell a famiclone from the real hardware it imitates by the presence of either alternate coloring, brand names that do not match the real console's, or weak construction. Console-type clones almost always utilize cartridges, and they are usually compatible with real Famicom (60-pin) or NES (72-pin) games, as well as custom-made carts (especially multi-carts, unauthorized game cartridges which hold a multitude of games as opposed to just one, which are often included with console-type clones). Console famiclones are most popular in Asia, parts of Europe and Latin America, with few actively sold in North America due to stronger enforcement of the copyrights in the games typically packaged with a famiclone and of the design patents in the imitated consoles.

=== Multi-console type ===
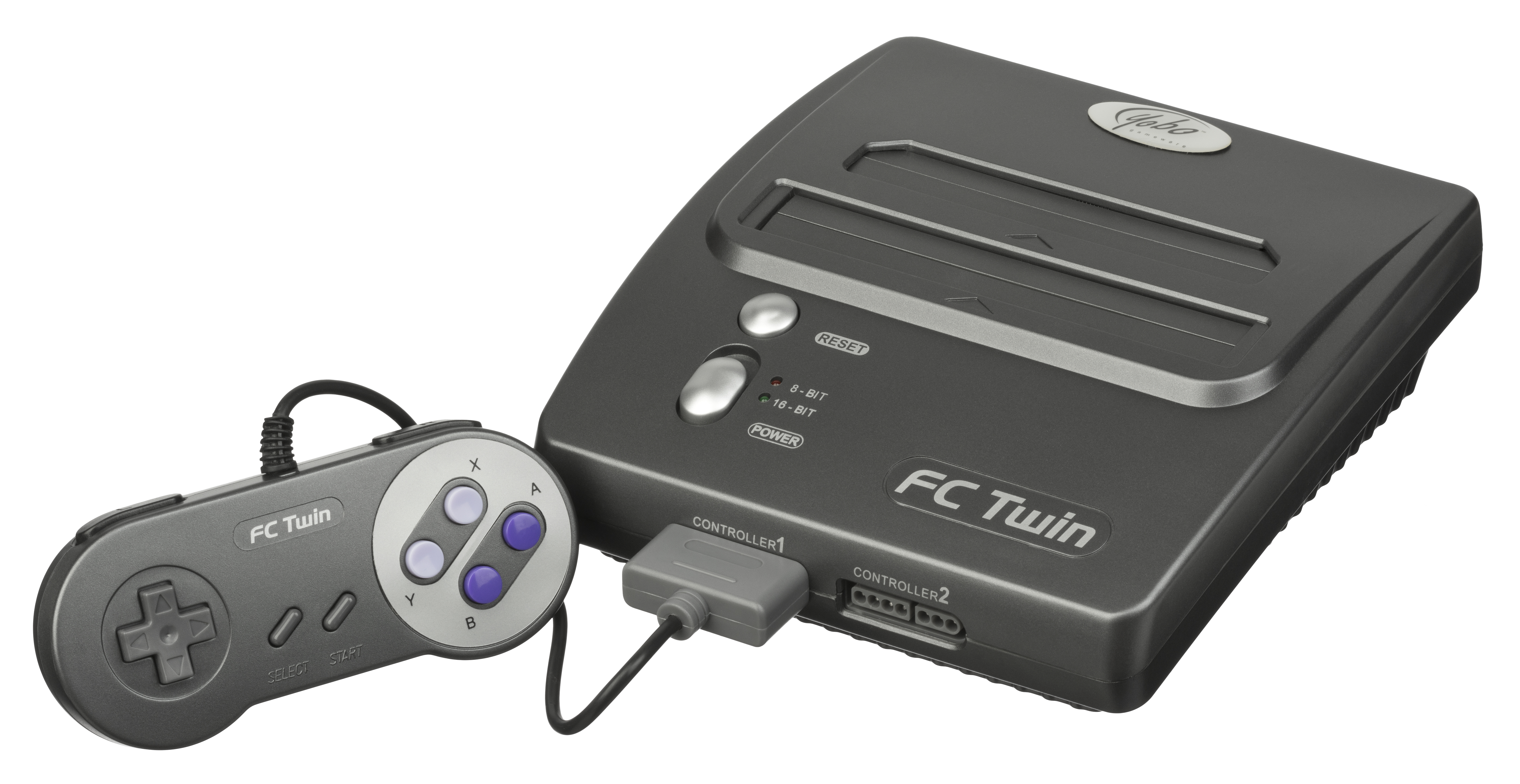
An example of a multi-console clone system: The FC Twin, designed to resemble a SNES-101. This clone system can play both NES and SNES cartridges.

Consoles such as the Retron 3 include multiple consoles in one clone.

=== Handheld type ===
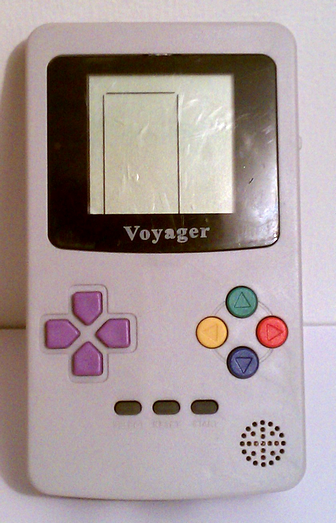
Power Joy Voyager handheld famiclone

These types of systems contain a built-in LCD screen and are usually powered by batteries, therefore acting as a completely portable handheld system.

One of the first handheld clones is the Top Guy, although only a small number are known to exist. More widely distributed was Redant's Game Axe, which was manufactured in several revisions through the 1990s. Game Theory Admiral featured an improved TFT screen and closely resembled the Game Boy Advance or Wintech GOOD BOY - not to be confused with a Famicom clone also called Good Boy - designed to look like a Game Boy Color. However, this smaller design included a smaller cartridge port; it was supplied with an adapter to allow the use of standard Famicom cartridges with the system. One of the more recent handheld clones is Gametech's PocketFami, the first to be actively marketed as a portable Famicom by its manufacturers, and one of the most widely distributed thanks to the new legitimate status of Famicom clone products.

There are also a number of famiclones in the shape of a Game Boy or similar, but which can only display NES/Famicom games on a TV, and have a simple LCD game in the screen area. such an example is the NES Clone "GameKids Advance", which resembles an older Game Boy Advance, and has a built-in LCD game, powered by 2 AA batteries, or the included AC adapter. However, the NES games can only be played on TV using the AC adapter. It uses a game cartridge, similar to those from a Game Boy/Game Boy Color, and also includes an adapter to play NES games.

==== PocketFami ====
The Pocket Fami, also known as Pocket Famicom (although this name was never used by the manufacturers as Famicom is a trademark of Nintendo) and Pokefami (ポケファミ) is an unlicensed handheld hardware clone of the Famicom produced by GameTech and released in 2004.

The PocketFami features a standard D-pad and six buttons: the four standard NES buttons (A, B, select, and start), plus two additional "turbo" buttons. It features a 2.5 inch backlit LCD screen capable of displaying both NTSC and PAL video. It has one headphone jack, an RCA composite output jack, and can be powered either through 3 AA batteries or AC adapter. Because of the different cartridge pin design of the Japanese Famicom (60 pins) and the international NES (72 pins), international (North American, Australian, European) cartridges cannot be played without an additional converter.

Nintendo sued GameTech over production of the PocketFami, claiming that the device violated their patents on the Famicom's hardware. The courts found in favor of GameTech and allowed the device to be sold in Japan, as the original Famicom was first sold in 1983 and most of Nintendo's essential patents on the system had expired.

=== Controller type ===
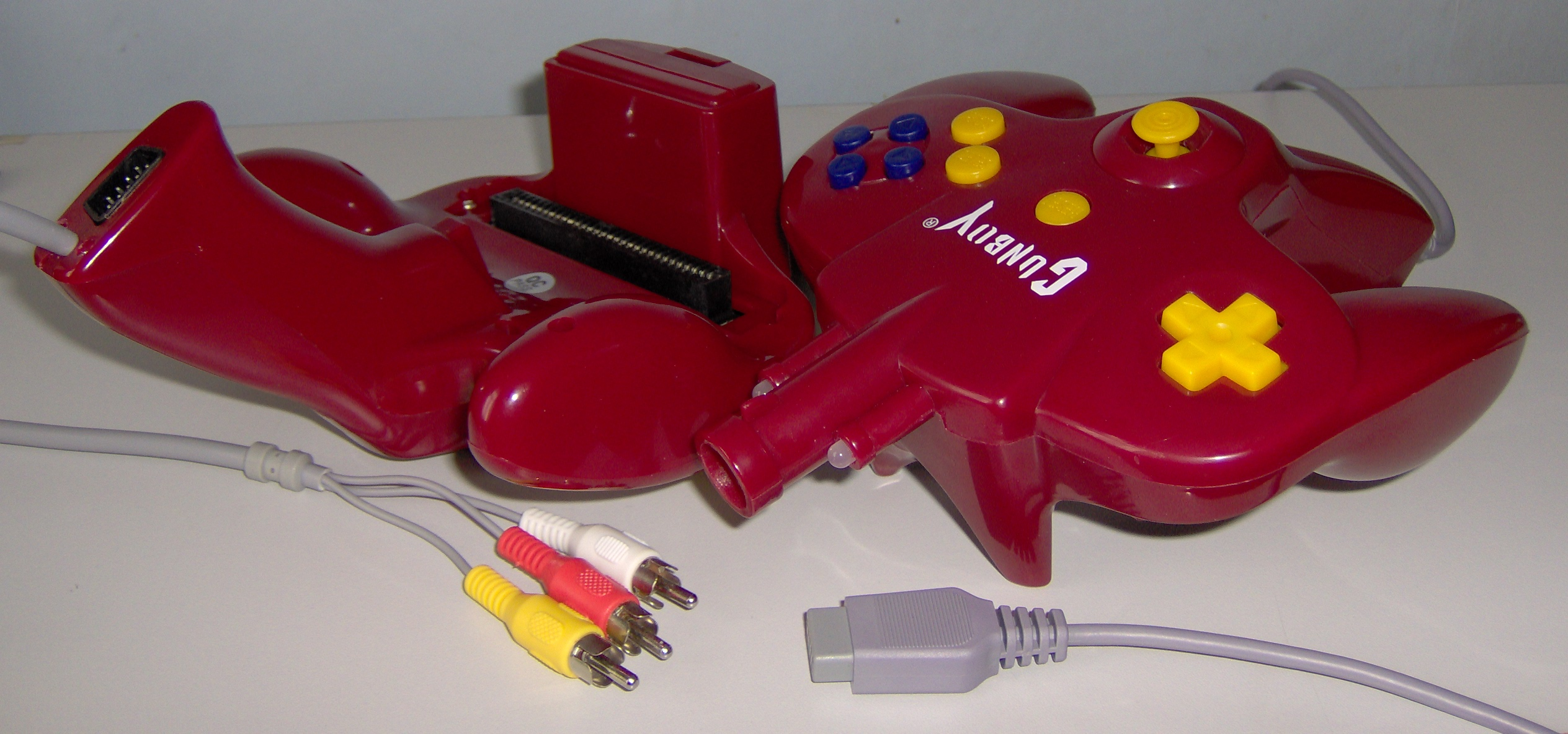
Two-player Gunboy set

This type of hardware clone, popular in North America and western Europe, is designed to hold all the console's hardware in the shape of a regular game console controller, usually the Nintendo 64's. Also known as "NES-on-a-chip" due to their extremely miniaturized hardware (relative to the original NES), these controllers usually shun or at least downplay a game cartridge interface in favor of storing games directly in internal memory chips. These famiclones can often run on battery as well as AC power, making them popular for portable usage. These clones have become especially popular in the USA thanks to the new "TV-Games" fad of selling legitimately emulated classic arcade games in a traditional-looking controller. (Atari games are especially common.) Controller clones can usually be found in places like flea markets, mall kiosks, or independent toy stores, and most people who sell and buy them are unaware or do not care that they are in fact illegally made. In Brazil this type of console is commercialized with the name GunBoy.

The Power Player Super Joy III consoles (also known as Power Games and XA-76-1E) are a line of unauthorized handheld Nintendo Entertainment System/Famicom clones manufactured by NRTRADE that are sold in North America, Brazil, Europe, Asia, and Australia. The system resembles a Nintendo 64 controller and attaches to a TV set. The second controller resembles a Sega Genesis controller, and a light gun is also included. NTSC, PAL and SECAM versions are available. They all use a custom "NES-on-a-chip" (NOAC) that is an implementation of the NES's hardware (Custom 6502, PPU, PAPU, etc.). The consoles came with 76 built-in games, although marketing frequently claims to have 1,000+ ways of playing them. Most of the included games were originally released for the NES or Famicom, but some have been created by the manufacturer to expand their list of included games. Most of the games have had their title screen graphics removed to save space on the ROM chip, not to mention a company logo removal trick for reduced liability. After this product gained some popularity, the Power Player 3.5, an improved model with more games, was released. A wireless version of Power Games was also released.

Playervision or Game Stick is another unauthorized Nintendo Entertainment System hardware clone built into a gamepad and sold in South America, and is just one version of Power Player Super Joy III, nevertheless, the name of the product varies on and in the box, user manual and the gamepad video game console itself. For example, the instruction sheet calls it "Playervision", but the system itself says "Players". This video game console has no cartridge slot, or an input for a second player controller or Zapper. This means that some of the games included cannot be used because of the need of a gun (Duck Hunt, for example). The system includes the same 76 games as Power Player Super Joy III, but some of them are repeated or are graphical hacks (Teletubbies, for example, is just Mario Bros. with graphic changes).

=== Computer type ===
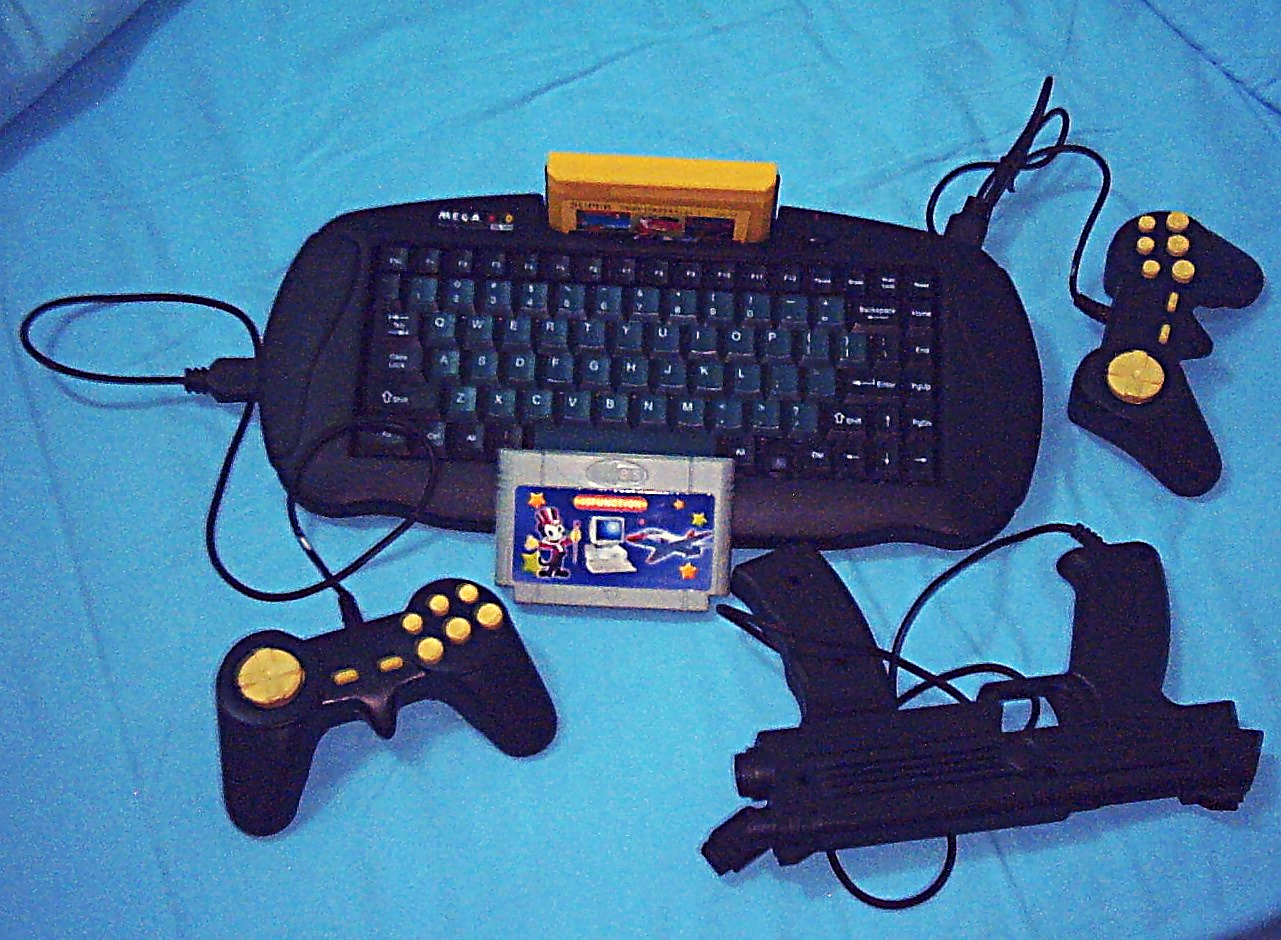
A Mega Kid MK-1000 Computer type famiclone

These famiclones are designed to resemble either 1980s home computers, modern keyboards, or the real Famicom's BASIC kit. Usually, these clones consist of the same hardware as the console type, but put inside a keyboard instead of a console lookalike. They are usually supplied with a cartridge containing some computer-style software, such as a simple word processor and a version of BASIC (most common are G-BASIC, a counterfeit version of Family BASIC, and F-BASIC, an original but more limited version), and some "educational" typing and mathematics games. Some even include a computer mouse and a GUI-style interface. Note that, while the interface is similar to Nintendo's Family BASIC keyboard, clone keyboards are generally not fully compatible with official software (and vice versa) due to differing key layouts.

== Software game titles ==
Since none of these unlicensed clones contain the 10NES authentication chip, most are capable of running games that an official NES model would not run. In addition, many modern NES clones come with a built-in selection of games, typically stored on an internal ROM which can range from 128 KB up to several megabytes in size.

These built-in games are usually designed to complement, rather than replace, the traditional cartridge slot, although some devices omit such a slot entirely, allowing only the built-in games to be played. Typical numbers for the built-in "distinct" games range from as low as three to as high as fifty or one hundred games for more expensive products. The number of "distinct games" is important, because while many NES clones claim to have thousands of built-in games, most of these games are usually nothing more than hacks that allow the player to start the same game at different levels or with different numbers of lives.

The games are usually direct unlicensed copies of official NES and Famicom game titles, usually with copyright information removed and sometimes featuring other minor changes. The most commonly found games in NES clones are generally games below 64 K of ROM size and which can be easily split into distinct subgames or levels. As such, Track & Field and Circus Charlie are present in a large percentage of NES clones, usually blown up to count as 6 or 7 "distinct" games each. Duck Hunt (often with its clay shooting mode shown as a separate game) is also a common NES clone feature as they justify the existence of the light gun accessory. Other popular, although less common choices, are Super Mario Bros. hacks, Excitebike, Tetris, Magic Jewelry (an unlicensed clone of Columns), older sports titles and miscellaneous platform games. Additionally, some clones incorporate games that, although they may initially appear to be original, are in fact counterfeit copies featuring extensive graphical (and sometimes audio) modifications. Examples of this include UFO Race, based on Nintendo's F-1 Race, Pandamar (also known as simply Panda), based on Super Mario Bros., Ladangel, based on Hudson Soft's Challenger and UFO Shoot, based on Duck Hunt.

However, some systems include legally licensed games; for example, the Rumble Station's 15 built-in games are licensed from Color Dreams, and Sachen's Q-Boy includes only its own original titles. A growing number of recent clones, such as those marketed by Technologies in the United States, contain large numbers of original games made by developers in China.

== Hardware and software compatibility ==
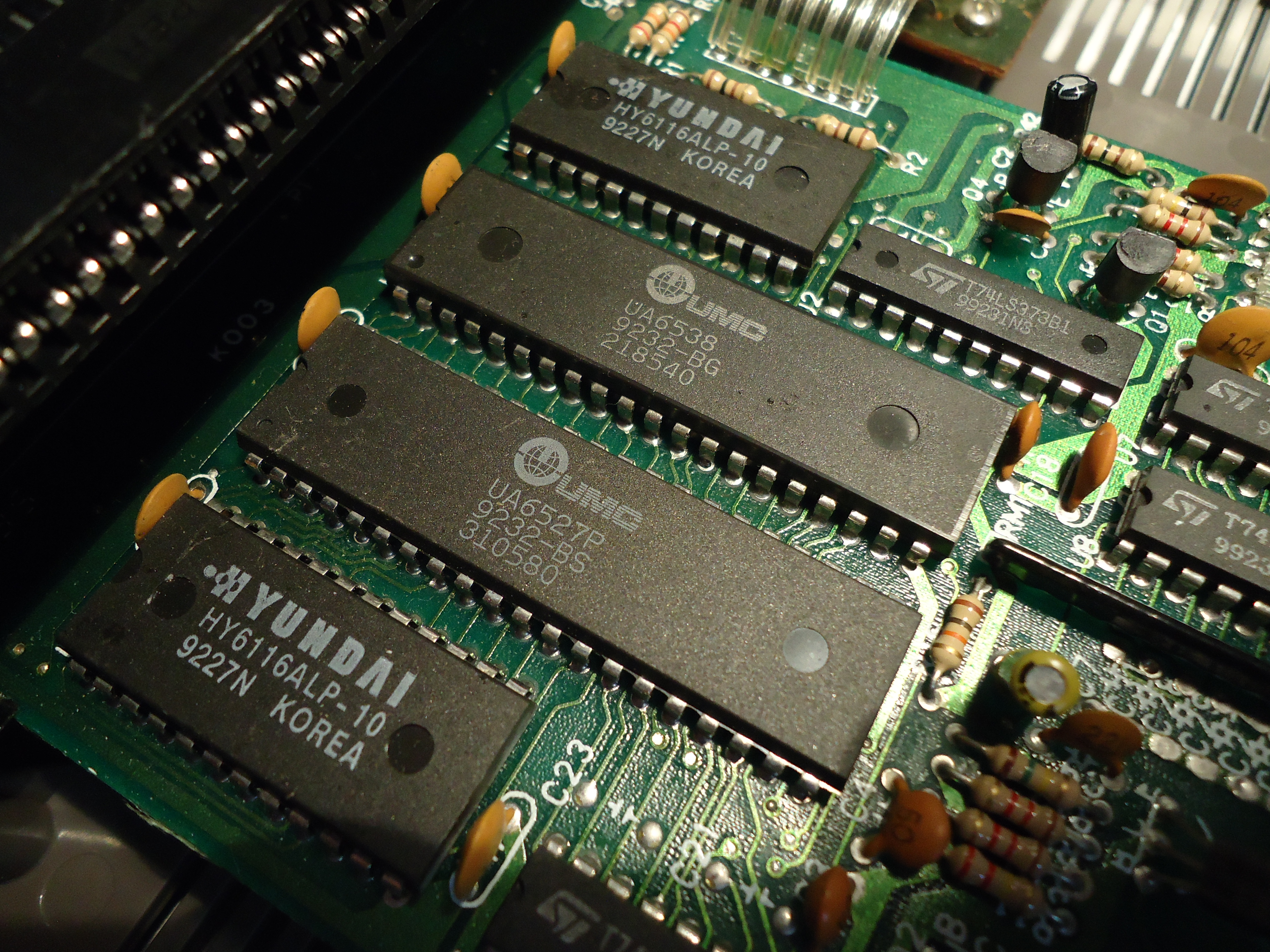
Discrete chipset manufactured by UMC used in a 1992 famiclone

While most famiclones will run most original licensed Nintendo software and work with most original carts (being even more versatile than an original NES because of the lack of regional lockout chips and sometimes having a dual 60-pin and 72-pin cartridge compatibility), the degree of hardware compatibility with original NES accessories and miscellaneous hardware equipment may vary, and even software level compatibility is not always perfect.

The most common software-level incompatibility in the built-in games that some sport, is the lack of save RAM, causing the few games that use it to fail when trying to save or load data.

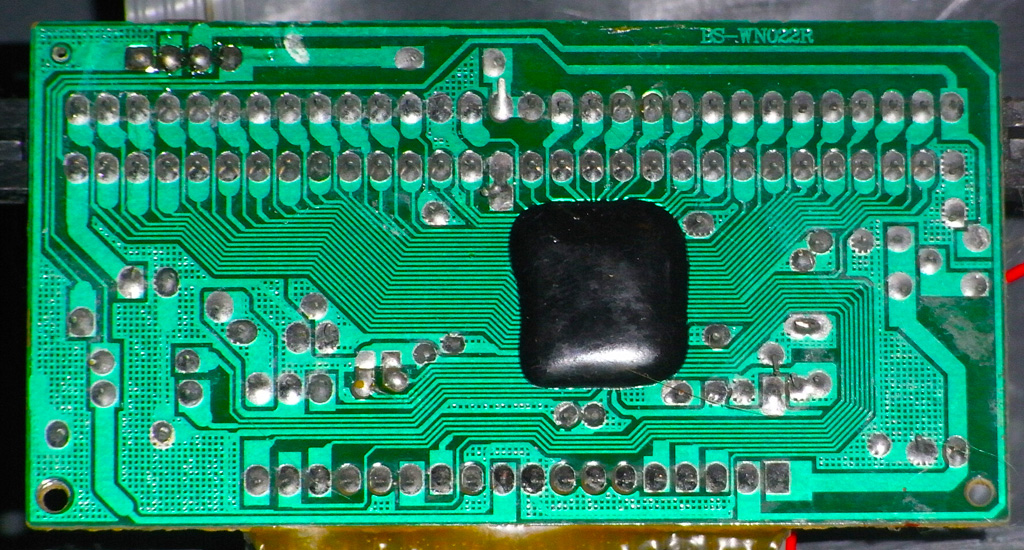
The NES is replicated in a small chip underneath the black epoxy blob (silicon).

Since most modern Famiclones are based on the NES-on-a-chip ASIC, they automatically inherit all of its limitations, which includes graphical glitches and compatibility issues.

At a hardware level, the most common incompatibility is the lack, in some famiclones, of the original Famicom's expansion port (although it is always present, at least at a logical level, and in some clones it is internally hardwired; e.g. in computer-type famiclones it is hardwired to the built-in keyboard, even if not externally accessible).

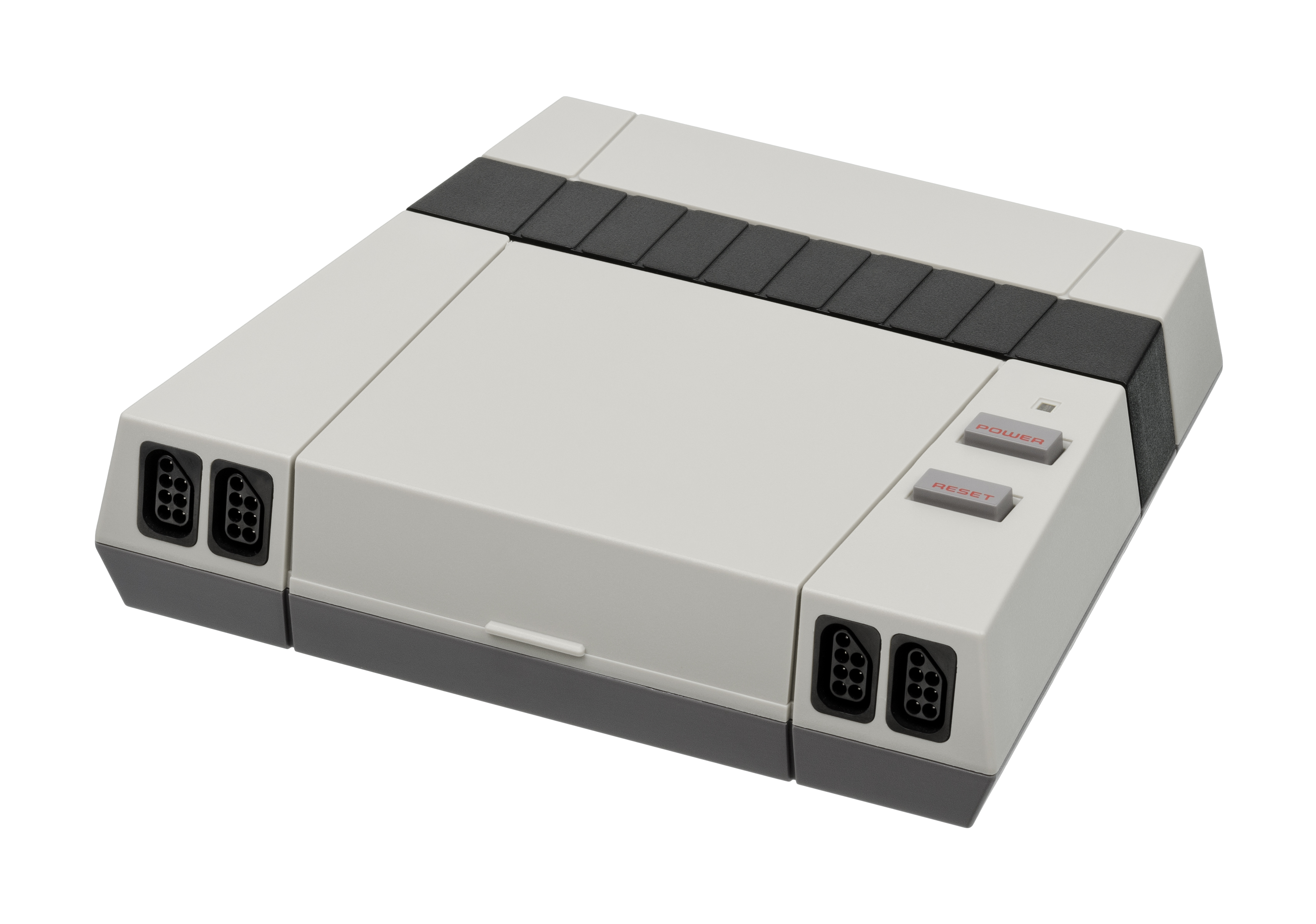
The RetroUSB AVS uses FPGA-based hardware emulation, achieving a high degree of compatibility.

Some famiclones also use standard Atari 9-pin shaped or even 15-pin joypad connectors instead of the proprietary NES connectors, and their controllers usually offer all of the functionality of a standard NES controller and sometimes features such as "slow motion" or several autofire keys with different speeds, which are not present on the standard out-of-the-box NES joypads. Despite being physically identical to Atari 9-pin, the protocol is different: Atari uses a parallel protocol where each wire carries the status of a single button, whereas famiclones use the same 4021-based serial protocol the original NES used. Connecting standard controllers to them may result in malfunction or damage of the controller or the famiclone itself.

Lastly, like many modern consoles and other devices meant to be connected to a TV, many modern famiclones lack an RF modulator and instead only have separate audio and composite video outputs (sometimes S-Video), also to cut on the (already low) production costs.

Some manufacturers have added new backward-compatible features to their NOAC ASICs, which allow developers to add new features like an improved processor (a 65C816 compatible), better graphics, stereo sound (by adding another audio unit), PCM audio, and a unified bus (OneBus) which lets manufacturers use a single ROM to store games instead of the two (one for program and other for graphics) the original NES and Famicom used. This hardware was primarily designed by Taiwanese companies V.R. Technology and UMC.

== Post-patent famiclones ==
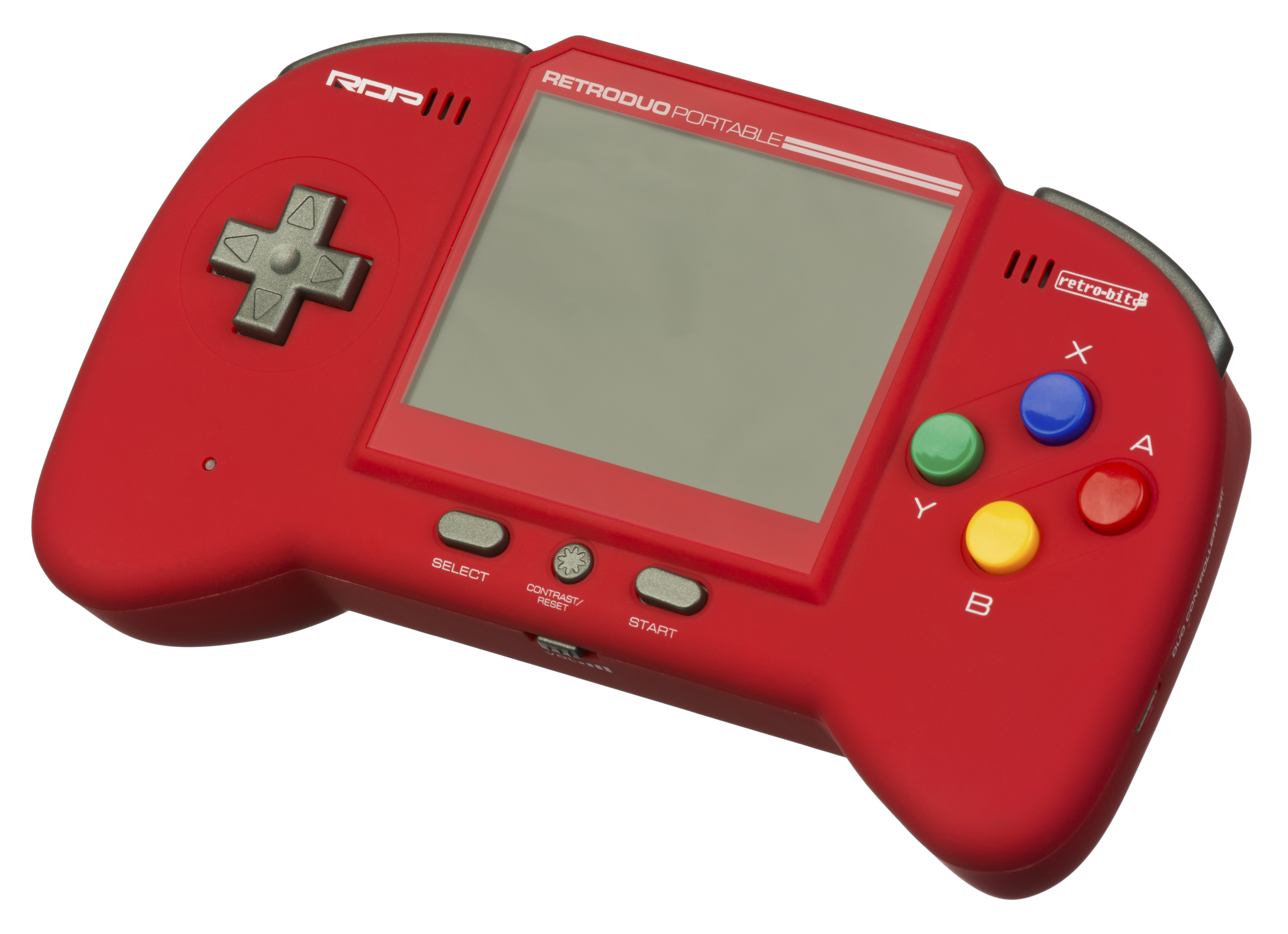
The Retro Duo Portable, one of the more recent famiclones made for American markets

Some of Nintendo's patents on the Famicom expired in 2003, followed in 2005 by NES-specific patents such as those covering the 10NES lockout chip. While Nintendo still holds various related trademarks, NES hardware clones are no longer necessarily illegal on the basis of patent infringement. This matter is complicated by the effect of different patents awarded in different countries, with different expiration dates. Nintendo sued Gametech in 2005 for selling the PocketFami, despite the patent expiration. Nintendo lost this suit. However, famiclone manufacturers who incorporate copyrighted games into the unit may still be subject to legal liability on that basis, due to copyrights having much longer terms than patents (in most countries creative works such as games are automatically in copyright for many decades, sometimes up to 95 years after their creation).

While the old-style famiclones continue to be found, the newly legitimized market has seen several clones that openly advertise support for original Famicom or NES games (or sometimes both), a feature not usually publicized by previous clones, which were often marketed as cheap gifts rather than Famicom-compatible systems. Examples of these newer efforts include the Generation NEX, which resembles a flattened version of the original NES and supports both NES and Famicom games, Gametech's Neo-Fami (also released in both Famicom and NES compatible versions as the "FC Game Console" by Yobo Gameware), and the handheld PocketFami, a more ambitious, albeit still slightly flawed, successor to the older TopGuy, Game Axe, and Game Theory Admiral. However, these more legitimate clones are still based on the same NES-on-a-chip architecture as the older systems, and as such still suffer from many of the same compatibility problems.

=== Generation NEX ===
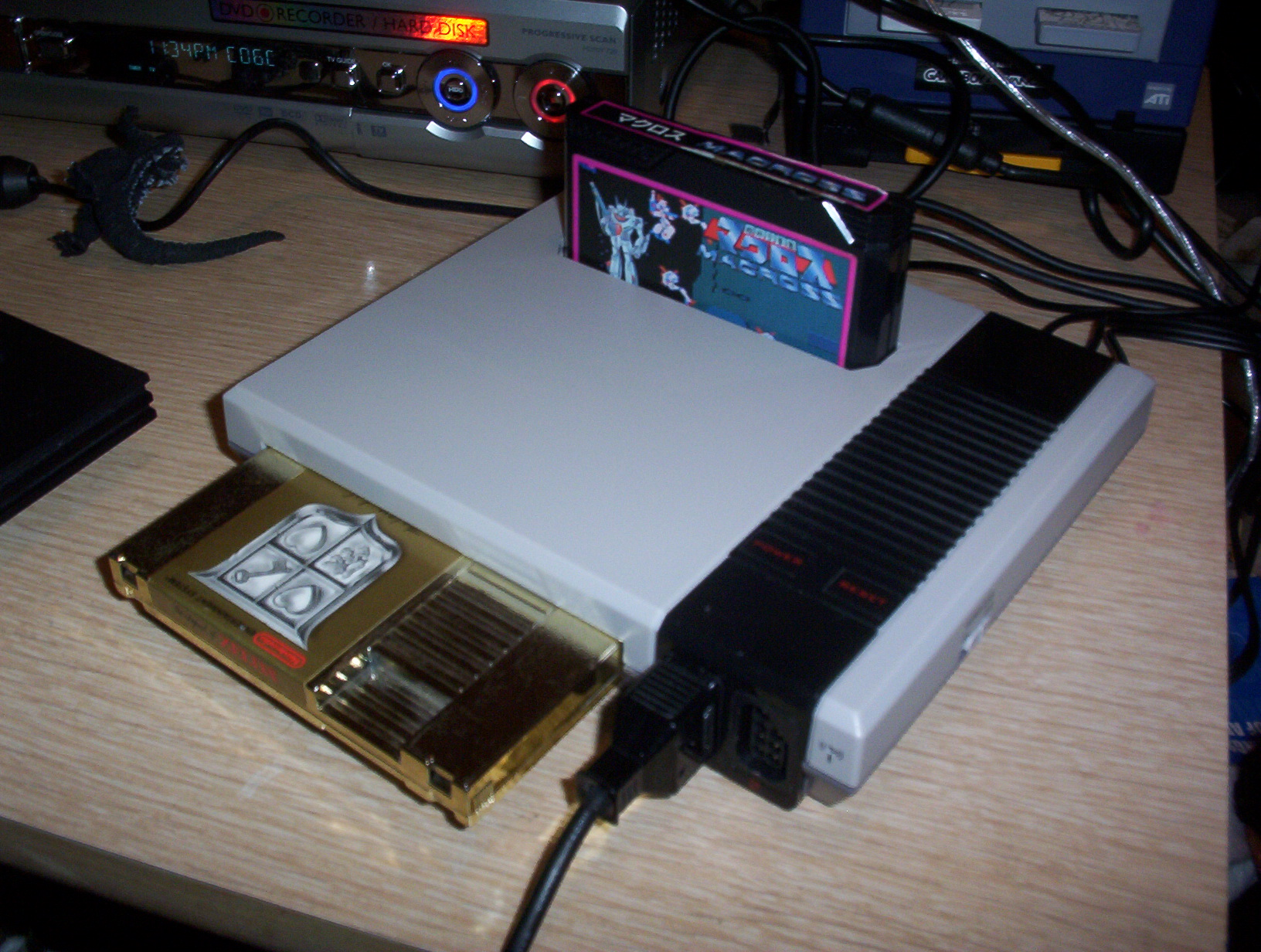
Generation NEX, with an NES game loaded in front and a Famicom game loaded topside

Generation NEX is a Nintendo hardware clone released in 2005. It is compatible with Japanese Famicom and North American/European NES cartridges. A front-loading slot is used for NES games, like the original console, while a top-loading slot handles Famicom games. Messiah Entertainment Inc., a company based in Los Angeles, announced the Generation NEX in May 2005. The console was shown at the Classic Gaming Expo that August, and was scheduled for release in September 2005. The NEX is a slimmer version of the original NES, measuring an inch and a half in height. The console uses a custom-designed integrated circuit based on NES-on-a-chip, which is used by most Nintendo clone consoles. The ASIC used is known as the VT03, and is part of the OneBus family of NOACs. The NEX is compatible with approximately 95 percent of NES games, excluding games such as Castlevania III: Dracula's Curse. The console includes stereo sound capabilities for homebrew games.

The NEX retailed for $59.99, and included one wired controller. Wireless 2.4 GHz controllers were also produced, and were sold in sets of two at a cost of $50 per set. The wired and wireless controllers were redesigned from the original NES controller, having an appearance more similar to the SNES controller. The console includes controller ports that allow the user to plug in and use original NES controllers instead, and the wireless NEX controllers are also compatible with the original NES. The NEX is also compatible with all other NES accessories, such as the Zapper gun. Messiah also produced a wireless arcade stick controller.

The Generation NEX initially received a negative reception from user reviews and some game websites. Complaints were made regarding the console's compatibility with NES/Famicom games, which exhibited graphical and audio issues in some cases when played on the NEX. Critics also disliked the soft, squishy buttons on the redesigned controllers. The NEX's importer, Lik Sang, canceled its pre-orders in November 2005, following the console's poor reception. Reviewers for IGN gave a positive review. They considered the console an improved version of the original NES, while writing that the new counterpart did not present any noticeable graphic issues. Christopher Grant of Engadget was critical of IGN's review, noting that it did not address the compatibility issues brought up in other reviews. Grant wrote, "IGN devotes the majority of the review to the pretty packaging, nice design, and wireless controllers, glossing over the compatibility. Don't they know: it's the games, stupid."

Shane Hirschman of CraveOnline reviewed the console a year after its release, and he also considered it an improvement over the original NES: "Given the Generation NEX's inexpensive price, high-quality, and efficient game play, gamers of all types will be pleased to see the NES is back and better than ever." Ben Kuchera of Ars Technica also reviewed the console a year after its release, and gave a mixed review. Kuchera found few issues involving graphics and audio, but he also considered the console's $60 price too high. Kuchera preferred the feel of the original NES controllers, and considered the wireless controllers too expensive as well. Kuchera subsequently wrote that the Generation NEX "muddies the image so badly" that "you're doing yourself a disservice by playing the games so compromised."

=== My Arcade Micro Player ===
Micro Player is a series of famiclone-based miniature arcade cabinets sold by dreamGEAR, a video game accessories company based in Torrance, CA, under the My Arcade brand. Several examples of game cabinets sold under this brand are Pac-Man, Dig Dug, Galaga, and Bubble Bobble.

The cabinets feature artwork from the originals, and utilize licensed NES ports of the games included on them, with Nintendo copyright information removed. The mini arcade cabinets were relatively popular due to their low price. They also released consoles containing these games with a handheld form factor.

DreamGEAR also manufactures several handheld consoles containing multicarts. However, since the consoles are sold in the US, they contain few pirated games, as to avoid legal action. The consoles instead contain various shovelware games by Chinese companies such as Nice Code Software, JungleTac, and Waixing Technology. Several variants contain licensed Data East games.

=== Patents ===
These are Nintendo Entertainment System related patents:

Utility patents

- U.S. patent 4,687,200
- U.S. patent 4,799,635
- U.S. patent 5,070,479
- U.S. patent 5,207,426
- U.S. patent 5,426,762

== Clones by region or country ==
=== Arabian Peninsula ===
The most popular famiclone in the 1990s were Rinco Home Computer and Al Sagr distributed by Ramar International Ltd, that previously sold Atari 2600 clones in the region, which also proved to be popular. Ramar translated some of the games into Arabic and published few unique bootleg games like The Dragon. In the same time, Nintendo officially distributed its products here, but it is unknown if they took legal actions against famiclones sellers.

=== Argentina ===
The Family Game was manufactured by the Argentine company Electrolab S.A. They distributed Super Family Electrolab Ending-Man (based on Ending-Man Terminator clone) and Electrolab Family Game with official distribution of Supervision. At the peak of its popularity, its sales amounted 95% of the argentinian console market.

According to an interview with Eddy Kiersz, CEO of Electrolab, they paid royalties to Nintendo both to sell the "famiclones" and to import the games, with the condition that they would not export them outside of Argentina. He also mentioned that Nintendo itself put them in contact with the Taiwanese company NTDEC which built the Famicom, to design the "Family Game. This is not true and Eddy Kiersz confused Nintendo of America with the American subsidiary of NTDEC, whose full name was Nintendo Electronic Co.

Other known consoles are NTD Family Game (distributed by NTD Electronica Argentina), Son Son, Froggy Family Game (distributed by BTE Electronics SA), Rasti (distributed by Rasti SA), Micro Genius, Family Game and Goodboy (distributed by Tec Toy Argentina), Edu Family Game (distributed by Videogames EDU S.A),Turbo Game (distributed by La Roque S.A), Super Game City (by Top Games), Asder PC-95 (distributed in Argentina, Brazil, Uruguay, Paraguay by M.S Trade and Commerce) and Hyper Boy (by Honson Games).

Another popular brand of famiclones were made by Bit Argentina and that is Bitgame, Super Bitgame and Video Racer. In 1992, Nintendo entered the Argentina market with H.Briones Argentina S.A. as representative and Bit Argentina was awarded as official distributor with the rights to still sell famiclones.

In 1993, more than 180,000 8-bit systems sold in the country were famiclones and only 12,000 units authentic NES systems. Nintendo took legal actions against distributors of clones. Argentina was one of the countries on Special 301 Watch List from 1994 due to huge intellectual property issue and authors of the report classified market shares of counterfeit 8-bit systems as "Very Severe" (50%-100%).

=== Australia ===
Since 1989, Centronics Systems distributed the Spica IQ-701 along with games and multicarts in custom-made boxes. Nintendo sued the distributor and the consoles were withdrawn from further sale. Special 301 Watch List from 1994 classified market shares of counterfeit 8-bit systems as "Moderate" (10%-25%).

=== Baltic States ===
The most known clone in these countries is Zhiliton which looks like the Sega Mega Drive model I. Due to the small market of these countries, there are also other clones such as Dendy, UFO, Subor, Liko, Terminator 2 and Fei Hao. Since 1993, Interpons company has been the supplier of Nintendo products (NES, SNES, Game Boy) in the Baltic countries, but these products were described by the local press as too expensive for the average citizen. Special 301 Watch List from 1994 classified market shares of counterfeit 8-bit systems as "Very Severe" (50%-100%).

=== Belarus ===
One of the first clones that arrived to Belarus was Zhiliton. Later, the Dendy was released, which was the most popular clone in this region. In 1994, Steepler, the producer of Dendy, reached an agreement with Nintendo to sell consoles in Russia and CIS countries with relinquished its claim to Dendy sales, meaning that Nintendo did not take legal action against famiclones. Special 301 Watch List from 1994 classified market shares of counterfeit 8-bit systems as "Very Severe" (50%-100%).

On April 18, 2025, the Belarusian government banned the import of the Dendy Junior DJ-300, one of the Russian clones of the original Dendy, due to the risk of electric shock.

=== Benelux Union ===
According to Special 301 Watch List from 1994, Benelux shares of counterfeit 8-bit systems were classified as "Severe" (25%-50%). Famiclones sold in region were Mastergames Super Com SP-72, replaced in the early 2000s by educational computers. Mastergames proudly wrote to retailers around the Europe, about selling 200,000 units only for 1 year in Germany, Benelux, Italy, Spain, Portugal, Switzerland, Austria, Greece, Algeria without trouble from Nintendo. Regional distributors worked with police and custom service to search for clone retailers.

=== Brazil ===
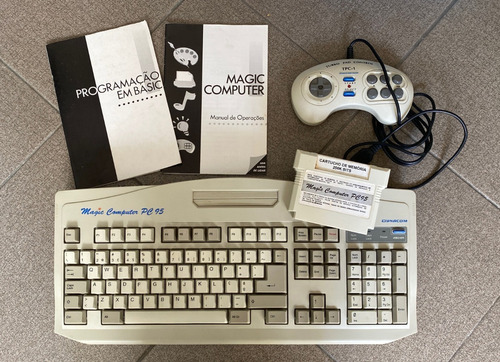
Magic Computer PC-95 was released in 1995 by Dynacom as an attempt to attract players bored with 8-bit generation.

Since 1989, Famicom- and NES-compatible consoles were made and sold in Brazil by local companies, some of which also imported and sold original NES cartridges and consoles. The first Famicom-compatible system, called Dynavision 2, was released in 1989 by Dynacom and used joysticks similar to the Atari 2600. The next system, Dynavision 3, had gamepads similar to Sega Mega Drive gamepads and had a dual slot that allowed both 60-pin and 72-pin cartridges. This was followed in the mid-1990s by Handyvision, a portable system that allowed video to be broadcast to the TV with a UHF transmitter. Another company, Geniecom, produced a black-colored clone with headphone jacks on gamepads, and Game Genie code input. The NASA clone was similar to the original NES, but had two slots, a 72-pin on the front and a 60-pin on top. Brazilian manufacturers also produced cartridges, but ran into the problem of having two formats. Hydron company solved the issue by making two-sided cartridges - one side 60-pin, the other 72-pin.

In 1993, Nintendo themselves arrived in Brazil and released the NES with the American cartridge slot. This official version was manufactured by Playtronic, a joint venture between the toy company Estrela and Gradiente. Nintendo worked with customs service from Brazil to stop imports of famiclones and took legal actions against clones distributors. Special 301 Watch List from 1994 classified market shares of counterfeit 8-bit systems as "Moderate" (10%-25%).

PolyStation, another popular clone was distributed from 2000 by Western businessman Ali Ahmad Zaioum, of Paraguayan-Lebanese origin. He also owns around 400 patents and trademarks supposedly created by him. However, he was accused by the Paraguayan court of falsifying documents and information in order to obtain registration with the Ministry of Industry and Commerce of Paraguay.

=== Caribbean ===
Though the official NES was distributed in most Caribbean countries by Inversiones St. John c/o Itochu De Venezuela, the Family clones were popular for those who could not afford it.

=== Colombia ===
In Colombia consoles named Creation, Super Creation, Nichi-man (manufactured by Micro Genius) and later on PolyStation were popular. Nintendo arrived in Colombia in the early 1990s with help of ab compufax. Special 301 Watch List from 1994 classified market shares of counterfeit 8-bit systems as "Limited" (5%-10%).

Also, a recent famiclone, and of the Nintendo Switch, is the Nanica Smitch. It has 800 NES games built in, and has removable controllers, but the controllers look like Joy-Con, but instead the thumbsticks are replaced with d-pads. It was also sold as the Game Magic. However, this famiclone is available just in Colombia.

=== Czech Republic/Slovakia ===
Most known clones sold in this country are Terminator 2, Bel Game, PolyStation, Pegasus IQ-502, Video Game-GT3300 and Micro Genius. Nintendo entered Czechoslovak market in 1992 with Game Boy, and in the next year, after split into two countries, Nintendo released SNES and NES. It is unknown if distributor took legal actions against famiclones resellers. Special 301 Watch List from 1994 classified market shares of counterfeit 8-bit systems as "Moderate" (10%-25%).

=== Denmark ===
In the mid-90s, many Danish markets sold Mastergames Super Com SP-72, but as in other Western countries, Nintendo quickly tracked down the distributors, sued them, and won in 1996. Most of the stock was destroyed by a bulldozer and the event was broadcast on TV as a warning to other pirates. Special 301 Watch List from 1994 classified market shares of counterfeit 8-bit systems as "Limited" (5%-10%).

=== Egypt ===
Originally, famiclones sold in Egypt were the same as the ones sold on the Arabian Peninsula primarily the Rinco Home Computer 3600. Many games by Sachen were sold there, as well as in other parts of North Africa. Later on, famiclones designed to look like later generation consoles such as the PlayStation series began to be sold. There were also ones designed to look like home computers. These were often packed with multicarts.

=== Finland ===
Some of the games shops marketed a few famiclones with yellow carts like Terminator 2 or promoted unlicensed NES games like Action 52. Nintendo took legal actions against distributors, and in 1994 the biggest seller of pirate games and consoles had to pay damages of $75,000. Special 301 Watch List from 1994 classified market shares of counterfeit 8-bit systems as "Moderate" (10%-25%).

Some misunderstanding was also caused by a joke article on April 1 in a Finnish and Swedish magazine about the new Scandinavian console called Viking X, whose design was taken from the Micro Genius IQ-301, which is why some journalists believed it to be real.

=== Germany/Austria/Switzerland ===
Few famiclones were released in the region like VidiTex VT-720, sold by Ultra-Sat Vierhaus and Master Games Super Com SP-72. Special 301 Watch List from 1994 classified markets shares of counterfeit 8-bit systems as "Moderate" (10%-25%).

=== Greater China ===
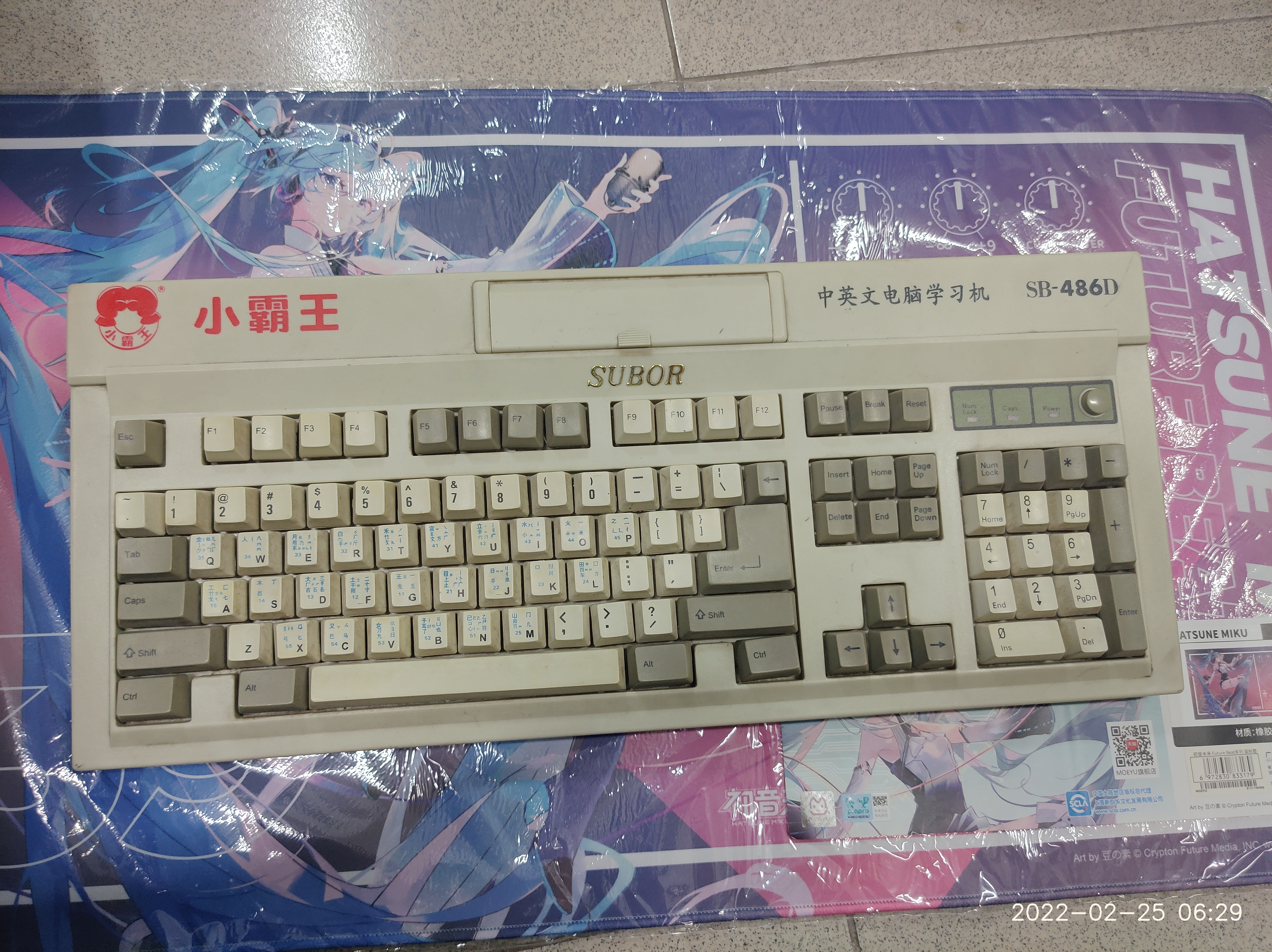
Subor SB-486D

The market of People's Republic of China opened to the console in the late 1980s, but high customs made imported consoles such as the Famicom very expensive. This is why local companies began producing cheaper clones which created a large grey market for unlicensed consoles and games. Counterfeit Nintendo was sold in great quantities primarily in large cites of Beijing, Shanghai, Tianjin, and cities of Guandong Province. In 1994, Beijing was the place where more than 10,000 stores sold famiclones and 50% of families used to have one. Some of the stores claimed that record sales were 10,000 units of cartridges in just one day. At that time, there were already factories producing clones of Game Boy games and consoles, and the first cases of pirated games for the Super Nintendo.

One of the most popular was Xiǎo Bàwáng or Little Bawang (Chinese: 小霸王; lit. 'Little Emperor or Little Tyrant') by Subor, which claimed to be one of the largest producers of video games in China. They marketed Super Mario Bros as Super Brothers II, and Tetris as Russian Bricks II. Another company called New Star, also claimed to be market leader with 15% shares of the Chinese market, largest distribution network of 300 retailers and more than 300 cartridges. Many brands and producers existed like Nanbeng Co. Ltd, Jichang Electronics Co., Ltd and more. Most of the local manufacturers began distributing console to other countries, which made China one of main hubs of famiclone production. Certain models were officially advertised by Jackie Chan.

Nintendo saw the market potential and decided to enter China in 1994, with Game Boy and Super Nintendo but it did not include NES, because according to company it was commercially impossible to market it. Due to lack copyright enforcements and border control it could not fight piracy. Until late 1993, pirates manage to sell 20 million units of all type of famiclones across China and by late 1995, the number increased to 30 million. China was one of the countries on Special 301 Watch List from 1994 due to huge intellectual property issue and authors of the report classified market shares of counterfeit 8-bit systems as "Very Severe" (50%-100%).

The popularity of these devices continued in the People's Republic of China in the 2000s, due to the fact that in June 2000, the Chinese government decided to ban all video game consoles. Since the mid-1990s Chinese manufacturers have been selling the latest Famiclone models as an educational computer with a keyboard and a cartridge with simple educational games. It turned out Chinese authorities allowed the further sale of that devices, not recognizing it as console, which resulted in next clone models from other manufacturers as well as new unlicensed games, miscellaneous programmes like Windows 98 or ports of newer games for 8-bit Nintendo such as Resident Evil (Bio Hazard), Tomb Raider or Final Fantasy VII. The full number of clones and units sold in China is still unknown. At the same time, Nintendo adapted to new regulations and entered the market with remodeled consoles through iQue.

In Taiwan, the Famicom had a limited release. Many companies, such as NTDEC or Micro Genius, were established in Taiwan and sold famiclones locally and internationally. According to Special 301 Watch List from 1994, around 130 manufacturers and trading companies were breaking the law and next 70 was suspected of doing that. Many Taiwan producers move their assembly operations to Mainland China in order to import into the country key video game components. This made Taiwan one of the most important hubs for the production of clones. In order to stop it, Nintendo made dozen lawsuits against producers and retailers. It also tried to work with custom service, but system was not effective.

Hong Kong had sold official Famicom consoles. But piracy was spreading in the region because companies from China and Taiwan had sales agents or manufacturing plants. Infringement actions and support from customs services were present. Both Hong Kong and Taiwan were on the Special 301 Watch List from 1994 due to huge intellectual property issue and authors of the report classified market shares of counterfeit 8-bit systems as "Very Severe" (50%-100%).

=== Greece ===
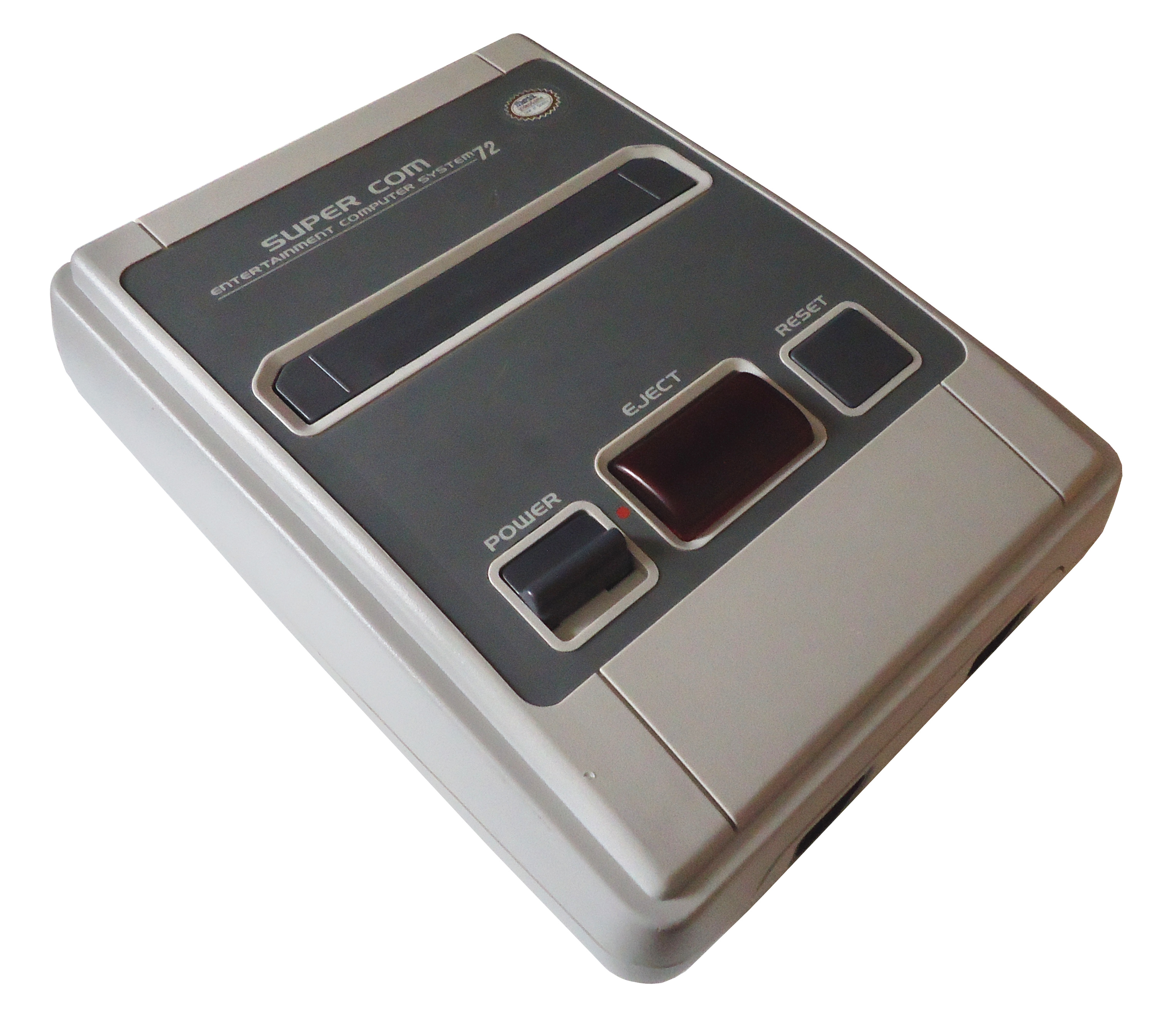
Super Com 72

From 1990, Greek Software marketed BIT 72 and Redstone (which used NES cartridges) as a competitor to officially distributed Master System. In 1991, Nintendo entered the Greek market, and took legal actions against importers, but clones were still sold in video game stores like Action Set - Family 52 from 1991 by Computer Market, Crazy Boy distributed from 1993 by Multi Logi and Mastergames Super Com SP-72. Special 301 Watch List from 1994 classified market shares of counterfeit 8-bit systems as "Severe" (25%-50%).

=== Hungary ===
Nintendo entered the Hungarian market in 1991 with Game Boy and NES, and a lot of clones were referred to as Sárga Kazettás Nintendo (Yellow Casetted Nintendo).

=== Iceland ===
Nintendo was in this region from the early 1980s, but stores distributed clones like Crazyboy, Redstone, NASA (compatible with NES), Action Set, NTDEC etc. Special 301 Watch List from 1994 classified market shares of counterfeit 8-bit systems as "Moderate" (10%-25%).

=== India ===
In 1987, Nintendo released the NES under the name Samurai marketed by Samurai Electronics. According to company owner Mahesh Toshniwal, despite initially good sales, China and Taiwan introduced clone consoles, priced 25% lower than Samurai, and multicarts priced 10% lower than games. Sales went down, and Samurai initiated legal action against the "Samurai" Micro Genius and informed Nintendo representatives, which did not made it better due to poor Indian law, resulting official NES sales dying out in 1993. Another version of events claims that Samurai registered the Micro Genius name by itself in 1991 and sold the clones as its own alongside the legitimate NES, but Mahesh Toshniwal refused to confirm this. This opinion can be supported by the fact that in 2008, Samurai would return in cooperation from HCL Infosystems as Nintendo dealer of Nintendo Wii and DS. It was not the first time when Nintendo cooperated with bootleg distributors in India. From 1994, Super Nintendo and Game Boy were officially distributed by Media Video (known from "Media" 8-bit clones) and from 2013 to 2017, Nintendo 3DS and WiiU were supplied by Sunder Electronics (manufacturer of "Sameo" famiclones), which until 2026 was last official Nintendo distributor in India.

In the 1990s, the demand for 8-bit clones was very high in India. There were around 55 brands in the country at the time such as Media Entertainment System (selling Little Master and Wiz Kid), Mitashi (selling Cricket), Mega, Sameo and others.<

=== Indonesia ===
Many famiclones from various producers, compatible with NES or Famicom, were rebranded and sold by Spica. Special 301 Watch List from 1994 classified market shares of counterfeit 8-bit systems as "Moderate" (10%-25%).

=== Iran ===
The most popular brand of clones were these, made by Micro Genius (simply called here Micro) and distributed from 1992. One of the most popular games were Super Mario Bros. (called locally Mushroom Eater), Contra, Duck Hunt, Double Dragon, Mega Man etc. Other clones include consoles like Super Semtoni, Terminator 2, etc.

=== Israel ===
In the early 1990s, besides the original NES, a huge hit was Super Megason, distributed from 1992 by Megason Entertainment Centers Ltd. and produced by Leader Design from Hong Kong. Megason advertised it with 500 different games available in the shops. In 1993, existed at least 6 distributors of famiclones selling Micro Genius, Goodboy, Terminator B.S 550, Hitex, Family Game, etc.

=== Italy ===
Besides clones sold by its original names (like PolyStation), there are a lot of consoles rebranded by distributors and sold with new names like Cartobit (known elsewhere as Mega Power II), Top Consolle (known elsewhere as Terminator 2), MegaTronix (known elsewhere as Mastergames Super Com SP-72), Argo Video Game System (known elsewhere as P-60), MARgame (known elsewhere as Micro Genius IQ-901) and Amstrad NN-900 (known elsewhere as PolyStation 2). Nintendo was here from 1986, and took legal actions against importers. Special 301 Watch List from 1994 classified market shares of counterfeit 8-bit systems as "Severe" (25%-50%).

=== Japan ===
Japan, despite being the Famicom's place of origin, is one of the most active markets for famiclones, although, almost all products are from the modern post-patent era.

=== Latin America ===
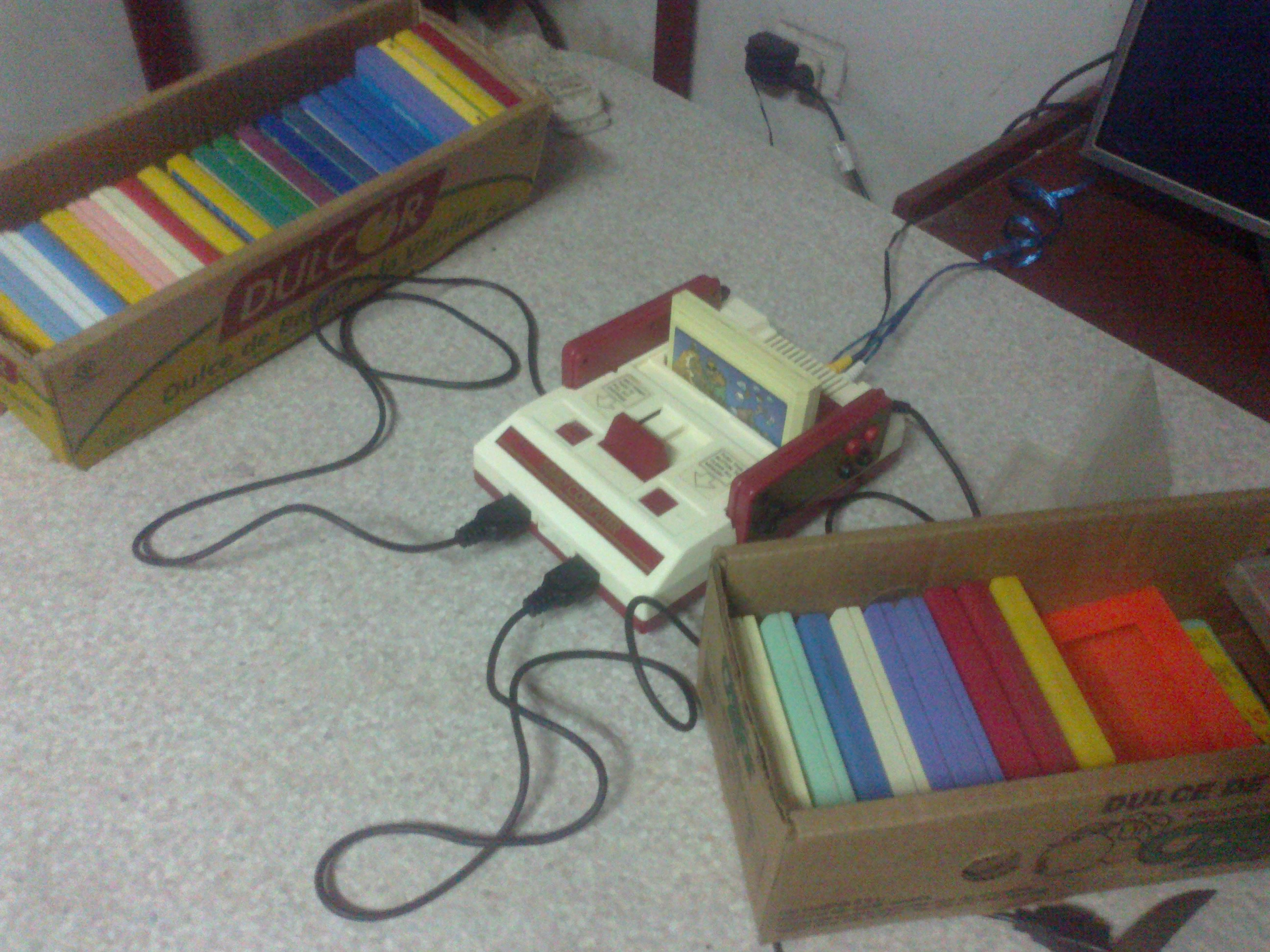
Typical "Family" clone

These systems were released in the early 1990s and were referred to as Family. It competed with the original NES distributed officially by Itochu Corp. (also known as C. Itoh & Co.), released around 1991. These clones remained famous in certain parts of the region and for example, PolyStations proved to be popular in parts of Costa Rica even in 2015. Special 301 Watch List from 1994 classified market shares of counterfeit 8-bit systems as "Limited" (5%-10%) in Colombia, Peru, Bolivia, "Moderate" (10%-25%) in Brazil, Chile, Paraguay, "Severe" (25%-50%) in Mexico, Ecuador, Venezuela and "Very severe" (50%-100%) in Argentina and Uruguay. Actions against clone importers were launched in Chile, Argentina, Uruguay, Paraguay, Mexico and Panama.

=== Mexico ===
Like in the rest of Latin America, the official version of NES was sold by C.Itoh/Itochu Corp. Mexico, but in poorer places with less access to supermarkets or shops with toys and electronics, popular way of play were clones called by everyone Family, mostly resembling Famicom or sometimes Super Famicom, sold with 72 pins adaptor for NES games. The certain retailers in the early 1990s also tried to create a brand and actively promote clones like MasterGames and Bit with games including Spanish manuals. Through the next years, Mexico got many other famiclones like educational computers or consoles mostly resembling the new generation ones, for example PlayStation. Special 301 Watch List from 1994 classified market shares of counterfeit 8-bit systems as "Severe" (25%-50%) and stated that distributor took part in actions against piracy.

=== Mongolia ===
Famiclones were brought to Mongolia from China and the most popular is Subor.

=== North Korea ===
Micro Genius consoles were sighted being played by children in the Songdowon International Children's Camp in 2008.

=== Norway ===
Chinese Jichang Electronics Co., Ltd., sent a promotional offer for retailers to produce a famiclones. The offer fell into Unsaco AS hands (distributor of Nintendo), which took actions against piracy. Special 301 Watch List from 1994 classified Norwegian and Swedish market shares of counterfeit 8-bit systems as "Limited" (5%-10%).

=== Paraguay ===
The country was one of the regions on Special 301 Watch List from 1994 due to huge intellectual property issue and authors of the report classified market shares of counterfeit 8-bit systems as "Moderate" (10%-25%). The main reason was poorly adopted trademark law which caused other companies to not only buy the rights to the Nintendo brand but also prevent the Japanese manufacturer from advertising its products under that name. Nintendo, reached an agreement with the government, which started slow changes of law. In the meantime, the government began successful raids on game stores to confiscate pirated systems, but the problem continues. The biggest issue, was not the Paraguayan market itself, but its location. The port became one of the most important locations for smuggling pirate stuff, which later found its way to countries such as Argentina and Brazil. It is estimated that by 1994, 10 million bootleg game cartridges had been transported through the port.

=== Panama ===
Panama was another country on Special 301 Watch List from 1994 due to huge intellectual property issue. Like Paraguay, it was a transit point for many pirated stuff, primarily heading to Argentina. Beside imports, in the country existed special factories that assembled game cartridges.

=== Poland ===
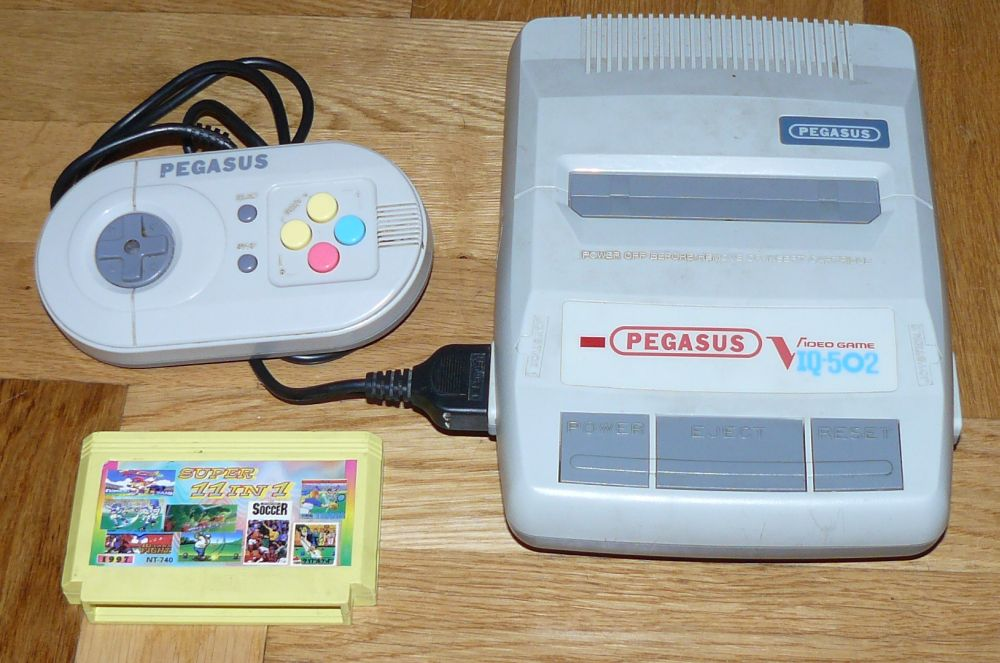
Pegasus IQ-502

In Poland, Pegasus was marketed by BobMark International., company established in 1991. In its lifespan, BobMark sold three models: MT-777DX, Super Pegasus and IQ-502.

In 1994, changes in Polish copyright law resulted that BobMark get rid of bootleg games and bought license to software published by Codemasters, Sachen and Western Technologies and distribute them in Asian cartridges. In late 1994, Nintendo entered Polish market so BobMark began to sell official Sega products. From that time Pegasus brand began to slowly lose its importance due to more cheaper clones and new generation consoles with last models sold until the late 1990s. The Pegasus reportedly sold more than 1 million units.

Other popular famiclones in Poland are for example BS-500AS, also known as Terminator, Gold Leopard King (GLK), PolyStation, Fenix or Family Game.

Nintendo took legal actions against small sellers of famiclones and cartridges producers, but they never sued Pegasus distributors. Special 301 Watch List from 1994 classified market shares of counterfeit 8-bit systems as "Very severe" (50%-100%).

=== Portugal ===
Most of these clones were called Family Game. Games and consoles were very easy to find even after 1991 when Nintendo entered the market and fighting piracy. Special 301 Watch List from 1994 classified market shares of counterfeit 8-bit systems as "Moderate" (10%-25%).

=== Quebec ===
Micro-Genius versions of Famicom games were a large part of the gaming market in Quebec throughout 1989-1990, with dozens of games selling thousands of copies in flea markets, independent game stores, and video game rental stores. Notably, Micro-Genius' version of Super Mario Bros 3 was sold extensively throughout Quebec for months ahead of its official North American NES release. Montreal was described as a major international thoroughfare for Micro-Genius sales, with a network of Taiwanese importers acting as a distribution nexus for Micro-Genius games and consoles, to such an extent that most of the cartridge labelling was bilingual to respect the Quebec-specific language Charter of the French Language laws, despite being illegal pirate games. This culminated in Nintendo issuing injunctions against 68 retailers, and the Sureté du Québec seizing several tens of thousands of Micro-Genius cartridges in December 1990, as part of a crackdown on the import and sale of illicit Micro-Genius games from Taiwan. As a result of this extensive market history, Micro-Genius games have become a prized collector's item especially in Quebec. Although Micro Genius did sell some IQ-501 Famiclone consoles in Canada, almost the entire pirate market was composed of Micro Genius cartridges with an adapter to play them on a legitimate NES console. Special 301 Watch List from 1994 classified market shares of counterfeit 8-bit systems as "Moderate" (10%-25%).

=== Romania ===
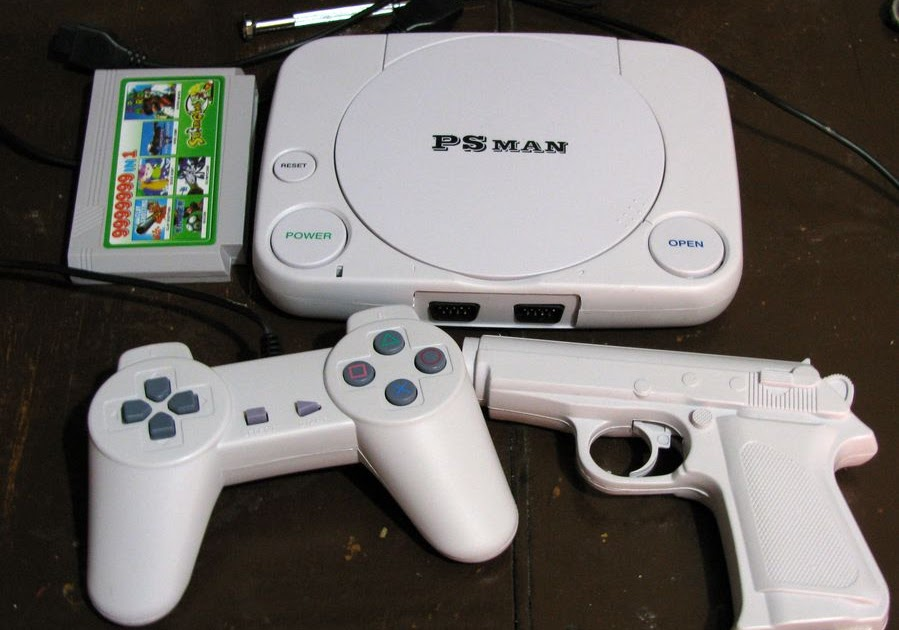
PolyStation

In Romania, several NES clones could be found in toy stores under marketing names such as PolyStation, Terminator, or variations of Famicom BASIC keyboard compatible consoles and these consoles were shipped with games such as '999999 in 1 which consisted of around 6 games in one cartridge and the rest were different levels of these games. The games and series consisted mainly of Super Mario, Bomberman, Lunar Pool, Double Dragon 3, Star Soldier, and Ninja Ryukenden 3.

Nintendo entered the Romanian market in the mid-1990s, but they did not bother with famiclone sellers.

=== Russia and the former Soviet Union ===
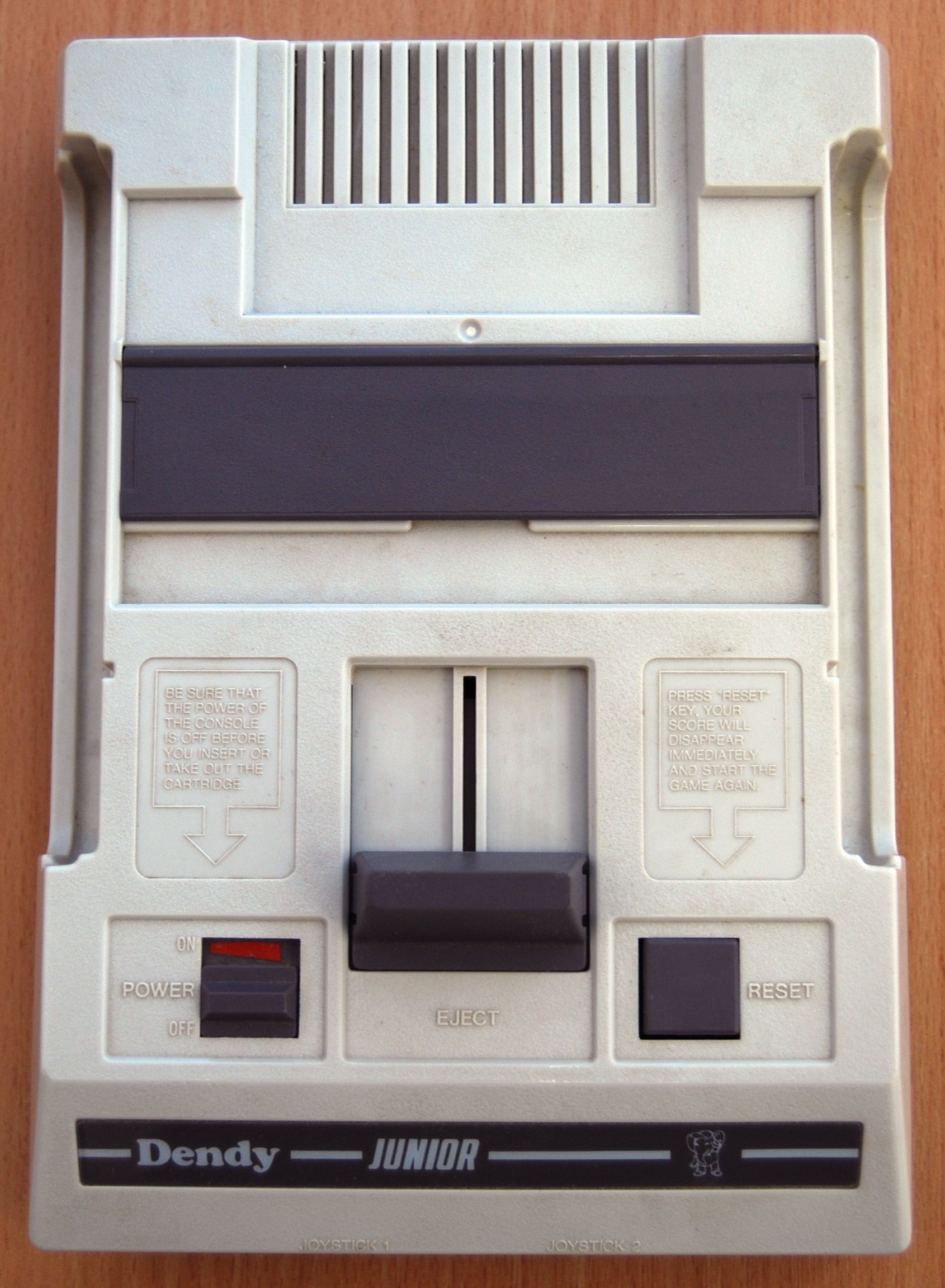
Dendy Junior

Dendy (Russian: Де́нди) was a hardware clone of the Nintendo Entertainment System (NES) popular in Russia and other former Soviet countries. Dendy is an NTSC console with forced PAL (SECAM on early models) mode, like Pegasus. Released in 1992 by Steepler, Dendy was easily the most popular video game console of its time there, and enjoyed a degree of fame roughly equivalent to that experienced by the NES/Famicom in North America and Japan. Business was so successful that the company spawned its own TV show about Dendy on Russian TV, and created stores all across Moscow and St. Petersburg, promoting and selling the console and its cartridges. Also, a cartoon about the "Dendy Elephant", the character on the console's logo, was filmed but not finished.

In 1994, Steepler, the producer of Dendy, reached an agreement with Nintendo to sell consoles in Russia and CIS countries with relinquished its claim to Dendy sales, meaning that Nintendo did not take legal action against famiclones. Instead, Steepler began suing other pirates. The company had a registered trademark for Dendy in Russia, which meant that any pirate who used their logo was breaking the law.

The Dendy reportedly sold 6 million units. Special 301 Watch List from 1994 classified market shares of counterfeit 8-bit systems as "Very severe" (50%-100%).

Dendy had competition in form of Subor, Bitman and Kenga. After Dendy there were also other clones like Simba's and Magistr.

=== South Africa ===
In South Africa, clones, known as "TV Games", were widely available. One popular clone available in the early 1990s was the Golden China; while another was Reggie's Entertainment System, named after the toy store chain that sold it; Older models looked like the Famicom but newer models resembled the PlayStation, like the TeleGamestation which also had a "mini tower" version with keyboard, and black/white monitor, to include educational software. These TeleGamestations have cartridges around half the size of the original Nintendo Entertainment System games, and although most games were cracked from there, some were also taken from the Master System. The box advertised "dazzling graphics" and the monitor on the box set features a modern-day at the time, soccer game. Games could be bought in chain stores or on the market or certain stores. Most cartridges were multi-packs, or many games within one cartridge. In some cases, games have had their names removed, and in some cases the original name of the game (for example, Dr. Mario was renamed "Medical Hospital").

Nintendo entered the South African market in 1992 and took legal action against Golden China for importing copied games. Special 301 Watch List from 1994 classified market shares of counterfeit 8-bit systems as "Very severe" (50%-100%).

=== Southeast Asia ===
In Southeast Asia, the Micro Genius was sold as an alternative to the Famicom. It originated from Taiwan in the late 1980s and uses 60-pin cartridges, most of which are multicarts. The Micro Genius had some original games, including Chinese Chess and Thunder Warrior. Starting from 1990, Nintendo sued local video games shops for selling unlicensed systems. Special 301 Watch List from 1994 classified market shares of counterfeit 8-bit systems as "Limited" (5%-10%) in Thailand and Vietnam, "Moderate" (10%-25%) in Indonesia and East Timor, and "Severe" (25%-50%) in Singapore, Malaysia, Brunei, and the Philippines. Distributor from Singapore partaken in legal actions against importers

=== South Korea ===
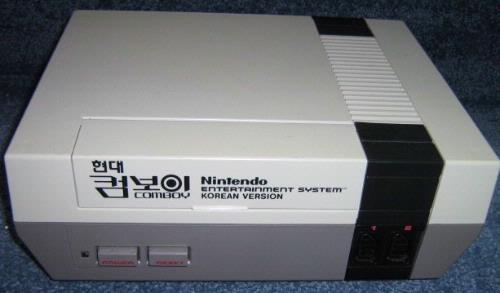
Comboy, officially licensed version of NES for Korean market

Starting from 1989, to the late 2000s, more than 100 famiclones were marketed in South Korea by different companies like Batman/Family Computer II, Kuk Je Academy K-007, Family Computer GH-100 (by Gihan Electronics), Family Computer (by Modowa), GamDori, Joycom, Viking, Super Com, Pascal, Noriteul, Little Com and many more.

The official NES console was marketed by Nintendo in South Korea under the name Hyundai Comboy. Special 301 Watch List from 1994 classified market shares of counterfeit 8-bit systems as "Severe" (25%-50%), with distributor trying to fight piracy.

=== Southeast Europe ===
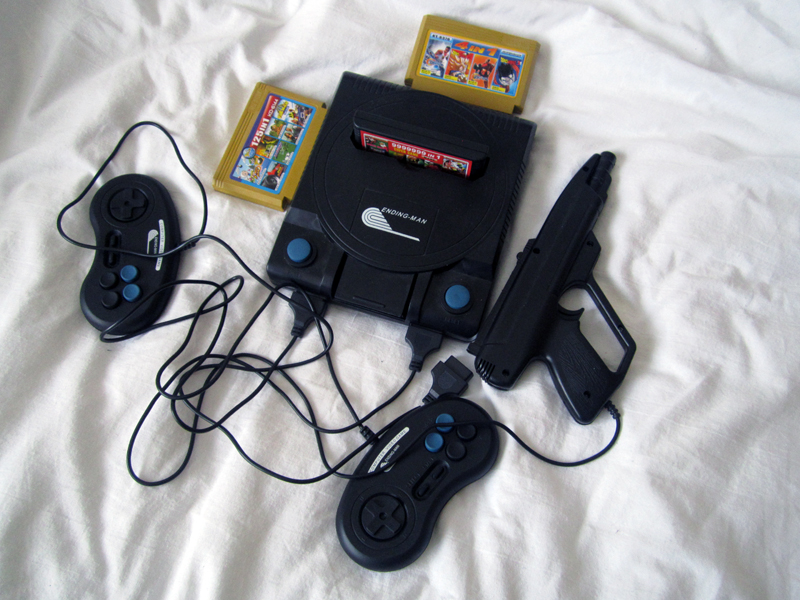
Ending-Man Terminator

First clones were sold as Micro Genius or simple clones called Family Computer that looked like Famicom. When Sega released Mega Drive, most pirates wanted to mislead buyers giving a cheaper and similar looking clone, mostly called Terminator. The same situation was with Super Nintendo and most known 8-bit ripoff of this one was sold as SP-60. Nintendo created distribution networks in every country of the region between 1992 and 1995. In some of the countries, Nintendo took legal action against shop that sold these clones, but in other countries, distributors of Nintendo did not react.

=== Soviet Union ===
Before the rise of Dendy, a rare famiclone made by Bit Corp, called the BIT70, was sold in state-owned stores across the Soviet Union, starting from around 1989. Due to its high price and poor marketing, the clone went practically unnoticed and is now largely forgotten.

=== Spain ===
Nintendo distributed the NES here from 1987, but clones were very popular even with good copyright law and legal actions against importers, which was not common in Western countries. Special 301 Watch List from 1994 classified market shares of counterfeit 8-bit systems as "Very severe" (50%-100%). The most common were these from the NASA and Creation brands (which are nearly the same, being the console name printed on the front the only difference), compatible with NES and Famicom games. It originally used the same chipset as the Dendy, manufactured by United Microelectronics Corporation, but manufacturers later used the NOAC ASICs. The NASA clones were sold by Gluk Video, a company known for releasing many unlicensed games for NES in Spain. Besides NASA they distributed clones such as Micro Genius, Yess and Silver Shadow.

Other known clones sold here are MasterGames, Nippon'do, Terminator 2, etc.

=== Thailand ===
Thailand's best selling famiclones were models from the Family brand - FR 102 and FR 202, introduced by Family TSI Ltd. Special 301 Watch List from 1994 classified market shares of counterfeit 8-bit systems as "Limited" (5%-10%), but some of the commentators stated that could be much more in later years.

=== Turkey ===
The most popular brand of clones is Micro Genius, distributed from 1988 by Aral İthalat, with new model being released by them even in the 21st century. There were also other brands like Home Computer (by Emek Elektronik), Star Trek Game Star, Kontorland and Fun Time. Nintendo products were sold here as well, but it seems that they did not bother with clones.

=== Ukraine ===
One of the most known clone in this country is Dendy. There were also other brands like Kenga which were very widespread in Ukraine. Kenga even had a TV show called Kenga Predstavlyaet!

Within the Donetsk region, the Atlantida company sold a Dendy competitor, the Jippy game console, which was a clone of Ending Man. The console also used a mascot similar to Dendy - a similarly dressed hippopotamus named Jippy. It had headphone jacks and switches to activate the "turbo-pause". According to various estimates, 15,000 copies were sold, including 5,000 in Moscow, Russia. A TV show Jippy Club was produced on the local Donetsk TV station. The project closed in 1994.

In 1994, Steepler, the producer of Dendy, reached an agreement with Nintendo to sell consoles in Russia and CIS countries with relinquished its claim to Dendy sales, meaning that Nintendo did not take legal action against famiclones. Special 301 Watch List from 1994 classified market shares of counterfeit 8-bit systems as "Very severe" (50%-100%).

=== United Kingdom ===
Famiclones in the UK were not popular and only a few like the Scorpion 8, sold by Interactive Enterprises, Good Boy by DGM Limited or DAC by Digital Audio Corporation were sold. Special 301 Watch List from 1994 classified market shares of counterfeit 8-bit systems as "Moderate" (10%-25%).

=== United States ===
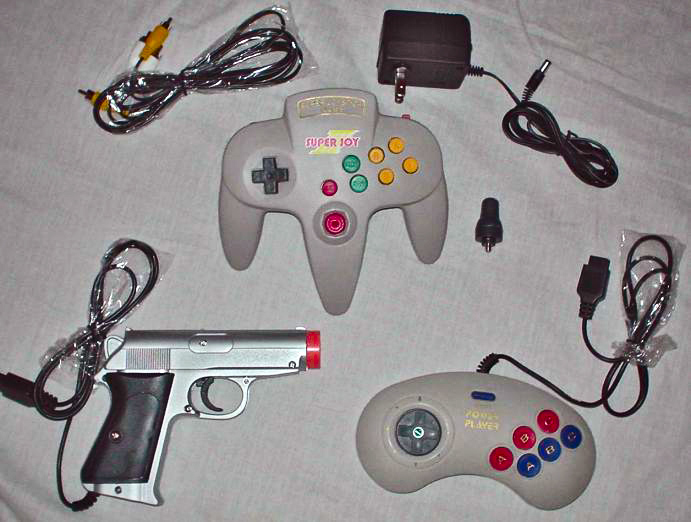
Power Player Super Joy III

During the life of the NES, famiclones were very rarely distributed due to very strong position of Nintendo on the market. One of the examples was NES-compatible Bit 70 and home computer with NES port called Bit 79, presented by Taiwanese company Bit Corp. on Consumer Electronics Show 1990, which had troubles to find any distributor who could market it in US. More common was sale of unlicensed video games produced by foreign companies such as NTDEC, which often resulted in lawsuits from Nintendo. Power Player Super Joy III was one of the clones sold in the US and was quickly discontinued in 2005, when Nintendo initiated a court case against sellers. Special 301 Watch List from 1994 classified market shares of counterfeit 8-bit systems as "Limited" (5%-10%). Today, portable famiclones are sold at budget prices in stores like Five Below and Walmart, under the Merkury Innovations brand.

=== Venezuela ===
In 1987, a new established company called Nintendo de Venezuela C.A began selling famiclones and bootleg games in self-made packaging. All consoles, games and accessories had the Nintendo logo, the boxes were translated into Spanish and had warranty cards, instructions and stickers to make everything look professional and official. It also registered most of the Nintendo trademarks and claimed to sell more than 1 million units until late 1993. Venezuela was one of the countries on Special 301 Watch List from 1994 due to huge intellectual property issue and authors of the report classified market shares of counterfeit 8-bit systems as "Severe" (25%-50%).

As competition, the original Nintendo products were sold officially by Inversiones St. John c/o Itochu De Venezuela S.A from in 1991 with NES being referred as "Nintendo el Original" to differentiate original one from famiclones. After several years of legal disputes among themselves, Nintendo and Itochu Corp. filed a lawsuit against the company in July 1995, which was ruled in their favor in 1999 and Nintendo C.A was obligated to pay damages and destroy all copies that were left in warehouses.

== Famiclone list ==
This is a non-exhaustive list of Famiclones:

- 8 BIT (Argentina)
- Active Game Master
- Arcade Action
- Asder PC 95
- Bitman (Russia)
- BitSystem (Dismac, Brazil)
- CherryBomb 2
- Clever Yixiu/Crown
- Classiq N
- Crazy Boy
- Cyber Boy
- Creation (Pakistan, India, made in China)
- Dendy: Dendy, Dendy Classic, Dendy Junior, Dendy Junior II, Dendy Classic II (Steepler, Russia) and some post-Steepler famiclones, Dendy Megaboy (NewGame) - famiclone with LCD
- Digitron Wireless Xtreme
- Dinosaur
- Dinostar
- Dongsheng
- Dr.Boy
- Dynavision (Dynacom, Brazil)
- Family Boy
- Family Computer
- Family FR102 / FR202
- Family Game
- Fc Compact
- Flashback
- Fugi Home Game Computer
- Game Player
- Game Axe
- Gamax
- Game Station - Oiny One
- Game Theory Admiral
- Generation NEX
- Geniecom
- Gold Leopard King
- GunBoy (Brazil, 2000s)
- Handy FamiEight
- Hi-Top Game
- Intellig (Intelligence)
- Inteltron 7000
- Interstellar Fighter
- IQ301 Computer Game
- IQ502
- Kenga KenKid, Kenga KenKid II (Russia)
- Kibord K-001, Kibord 003 (Simba's, Russia)
- Little Master (India, 1990s)
- Mastergames Ending Man
- Mastergames Mega Power II
- Magic Computer (Dynacom, Brazil)
- Magistr: Matrix, Sniper, Kids, Geniy, Geniy 2, Bakalavr (NewGame, Russia)
- Mega Kid MK-1000
- Micro Genius
- Mega Joy (I & II)
- Mitashi Game In Champ
- My Arcade Micro Player
- NASA Entertainment Computer System
- Neo-Fami
- NES Video Game System
- N-Joypad/CD3900
- PC Game
- Pegasus
- Phantom System (Gradiente, Brazil)
- Pocket Famicom
- Polystation
- Power Player Super Joy III
- Retrocon
- Retro Duo
- Rumble Station
- Simba's (Russia)
- Soccer Station
- Spica (Indonesia, 1990s)
- Subor SB-218, SB-286, SB-486, SB-926, SB-2000
- Sup Gaming Famiclone
- Super 8
- Super 8 bit game
- Super Com 72
- Terminator 1, 2, 3 and Ending Man
- Top Game (Brazil)
- Turbo Game (Brazil)
- Tristar 64
- V~Com (Indonesia, 2000s)
- V~Com Portable aka Game Boy Clone (Indonesia, 2010s)
- VG Pocket Max
- X Play Vintage (Jimmy Ltda., Brazil, 2010s)
- WizKid (India, 1990s)
- Wi Vision
- Yobo FC Game Console

== Gallery ==
Some popular Famiclones

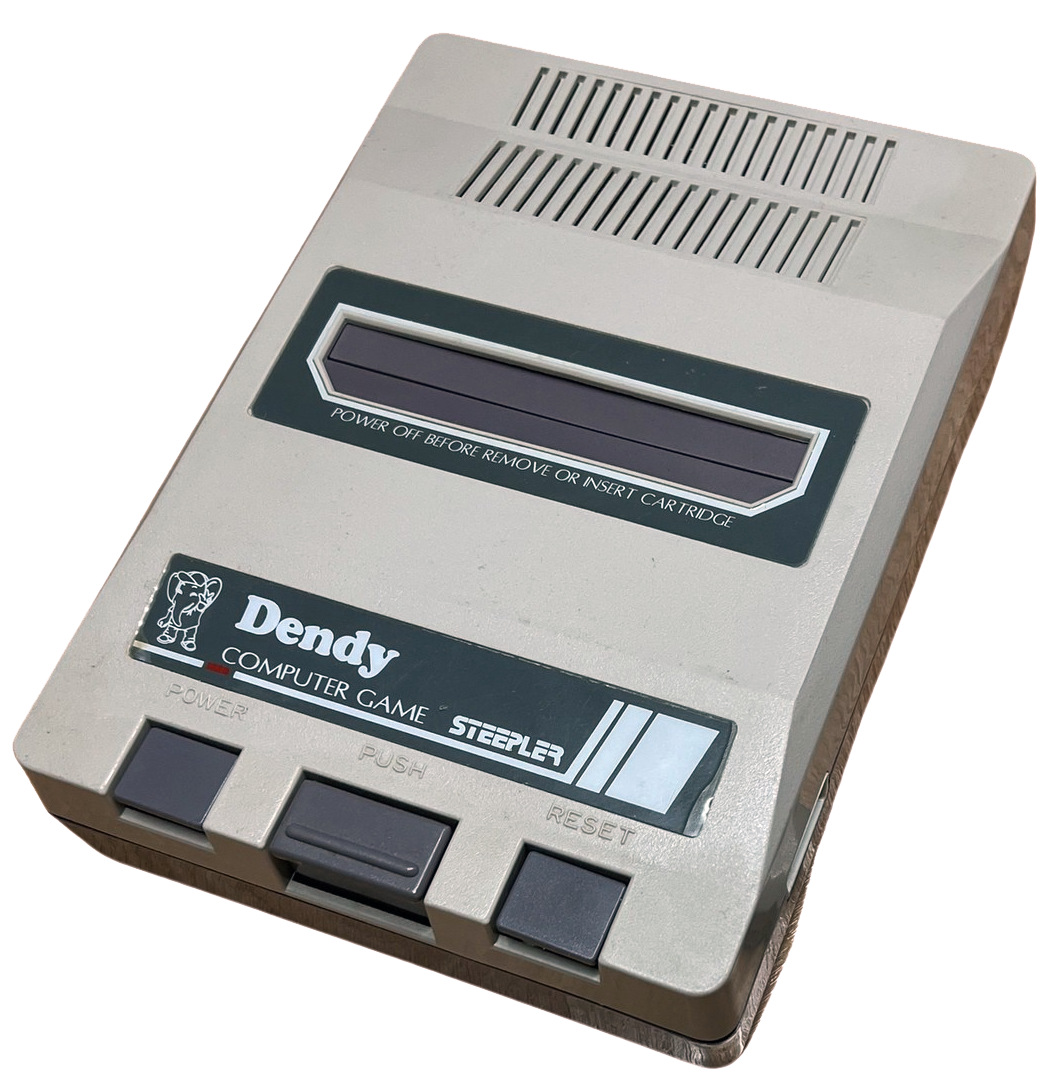
Dendy Classic

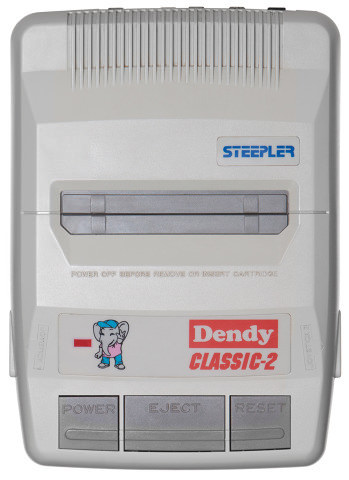
Dendy Classic-2

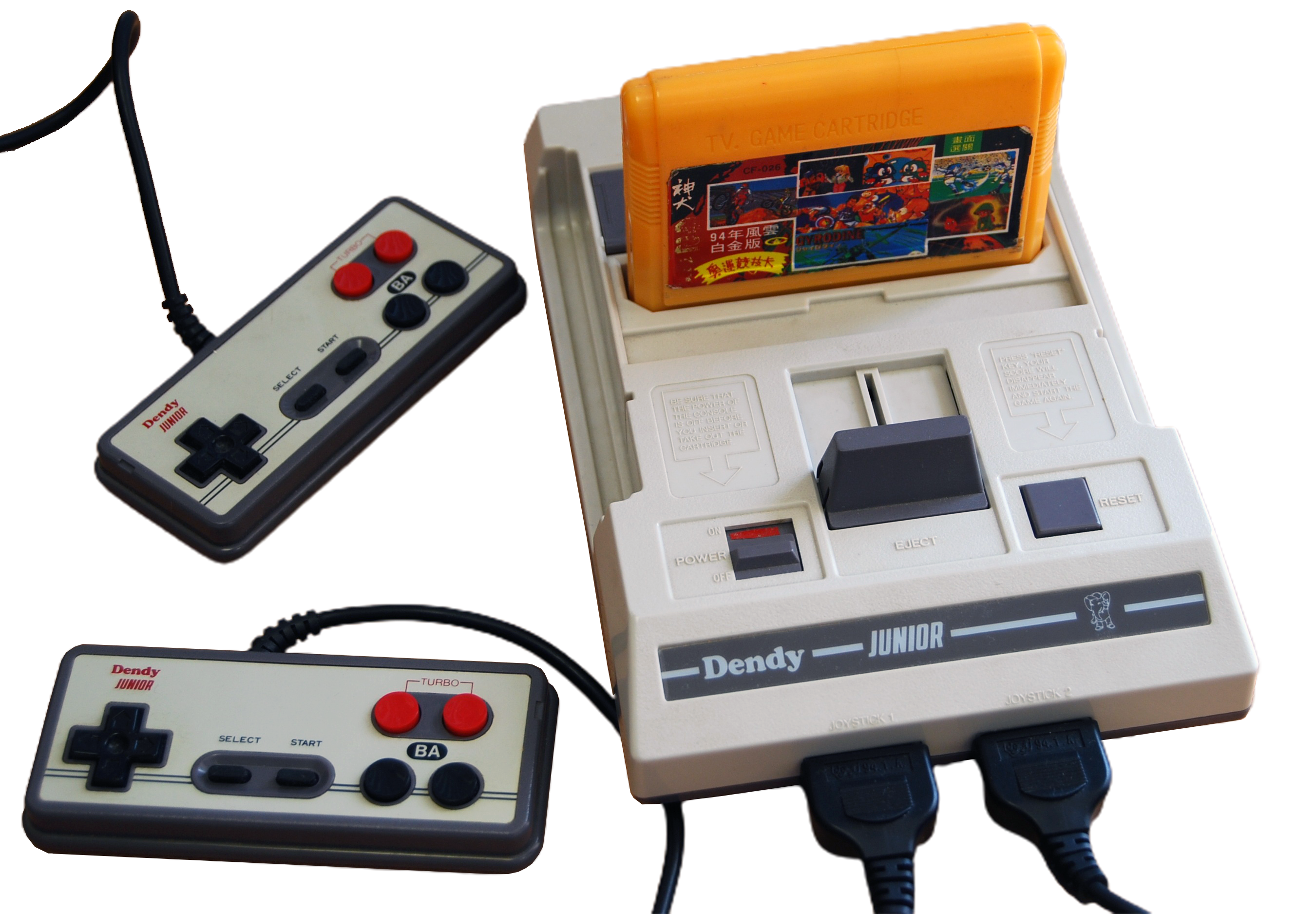
Dendy Junior

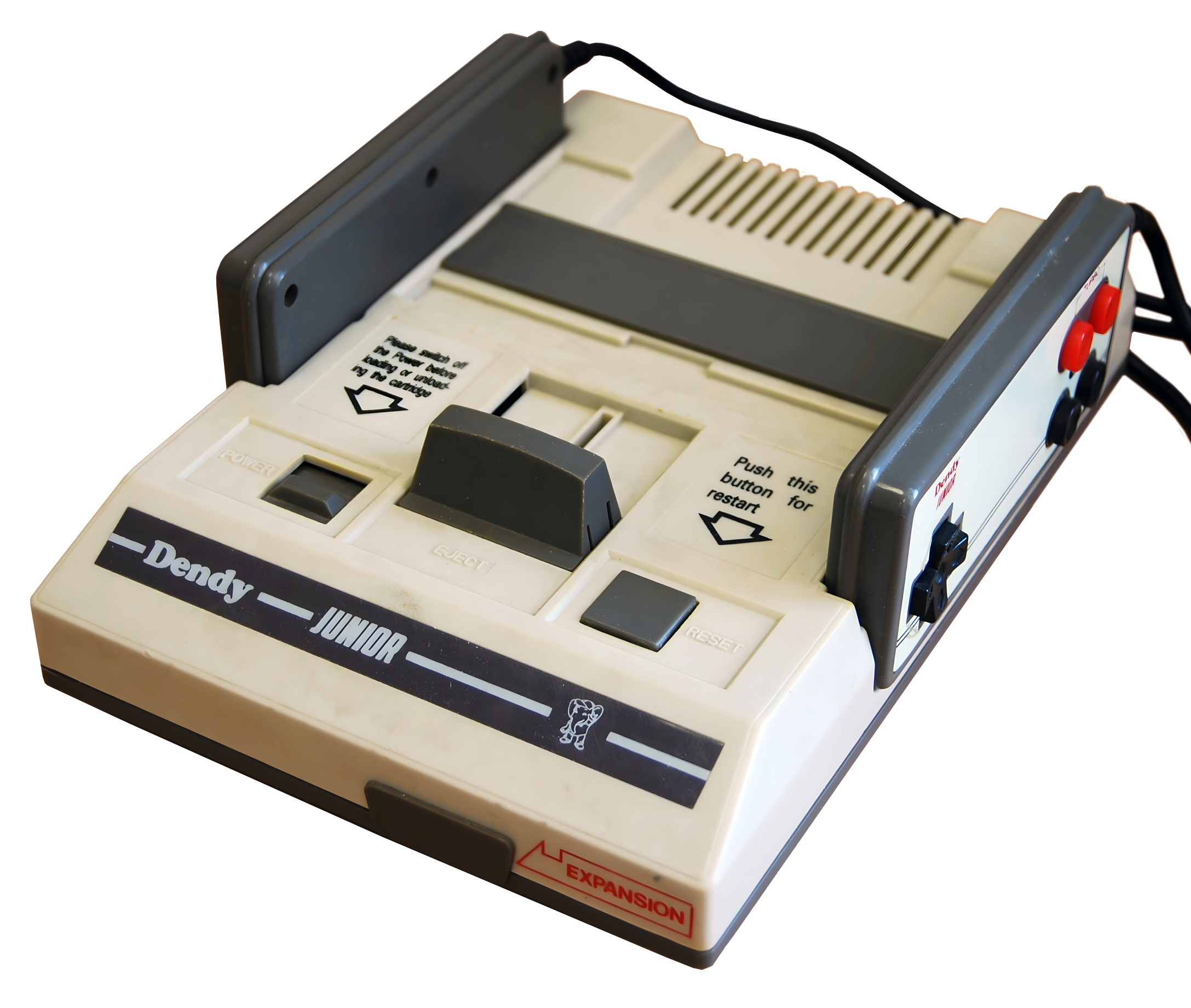
Dendy Junior II

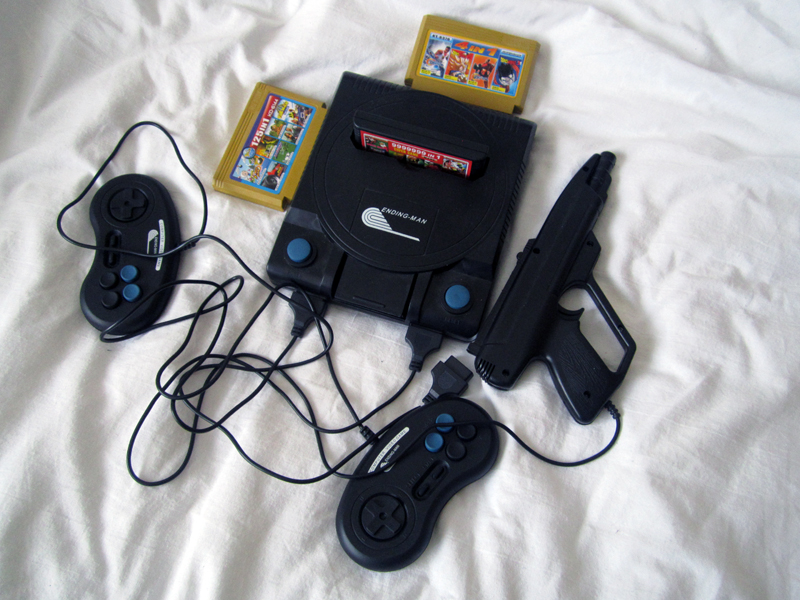
Ending-Man Terminator / Terminator 2

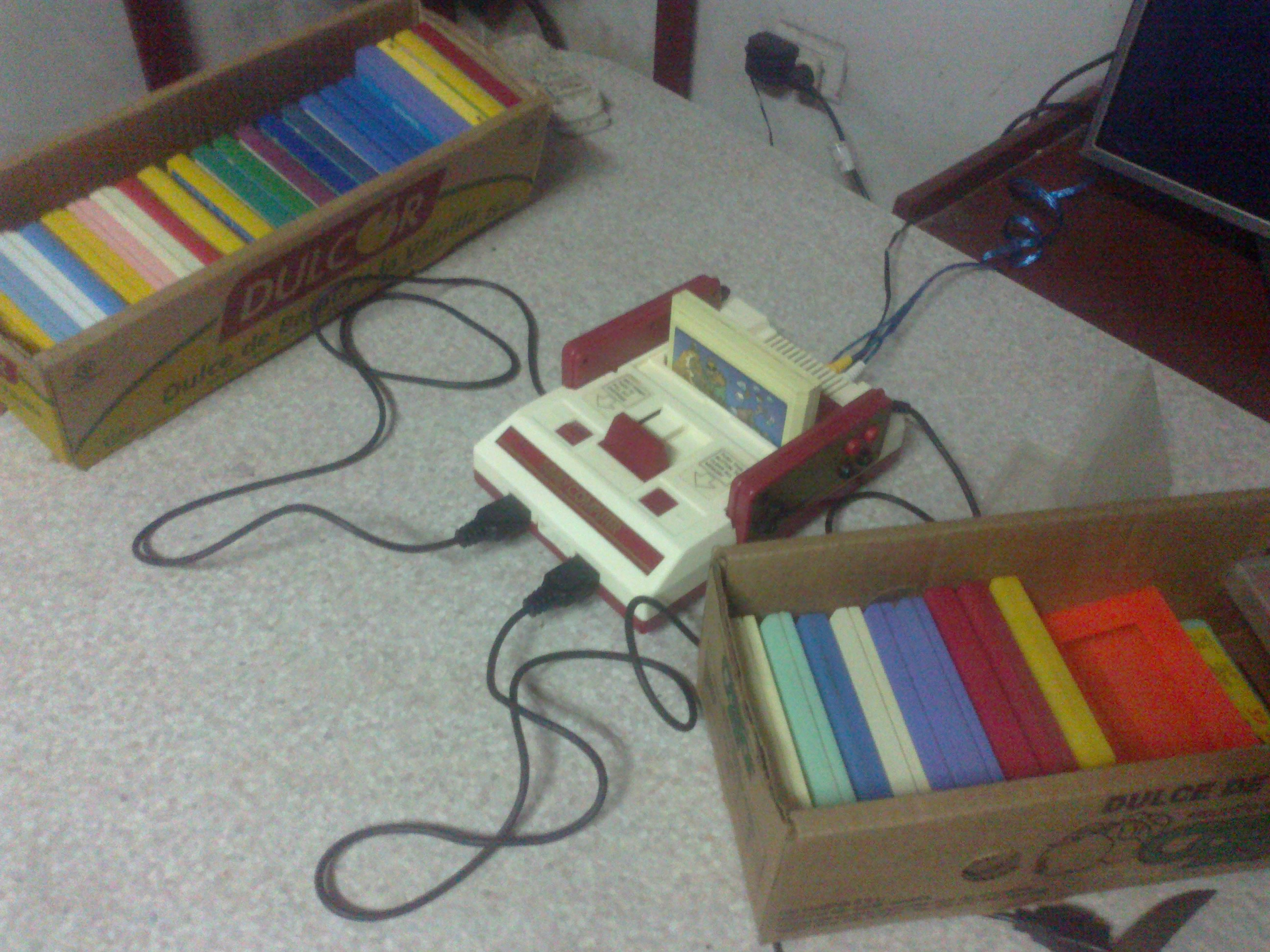
Family Game

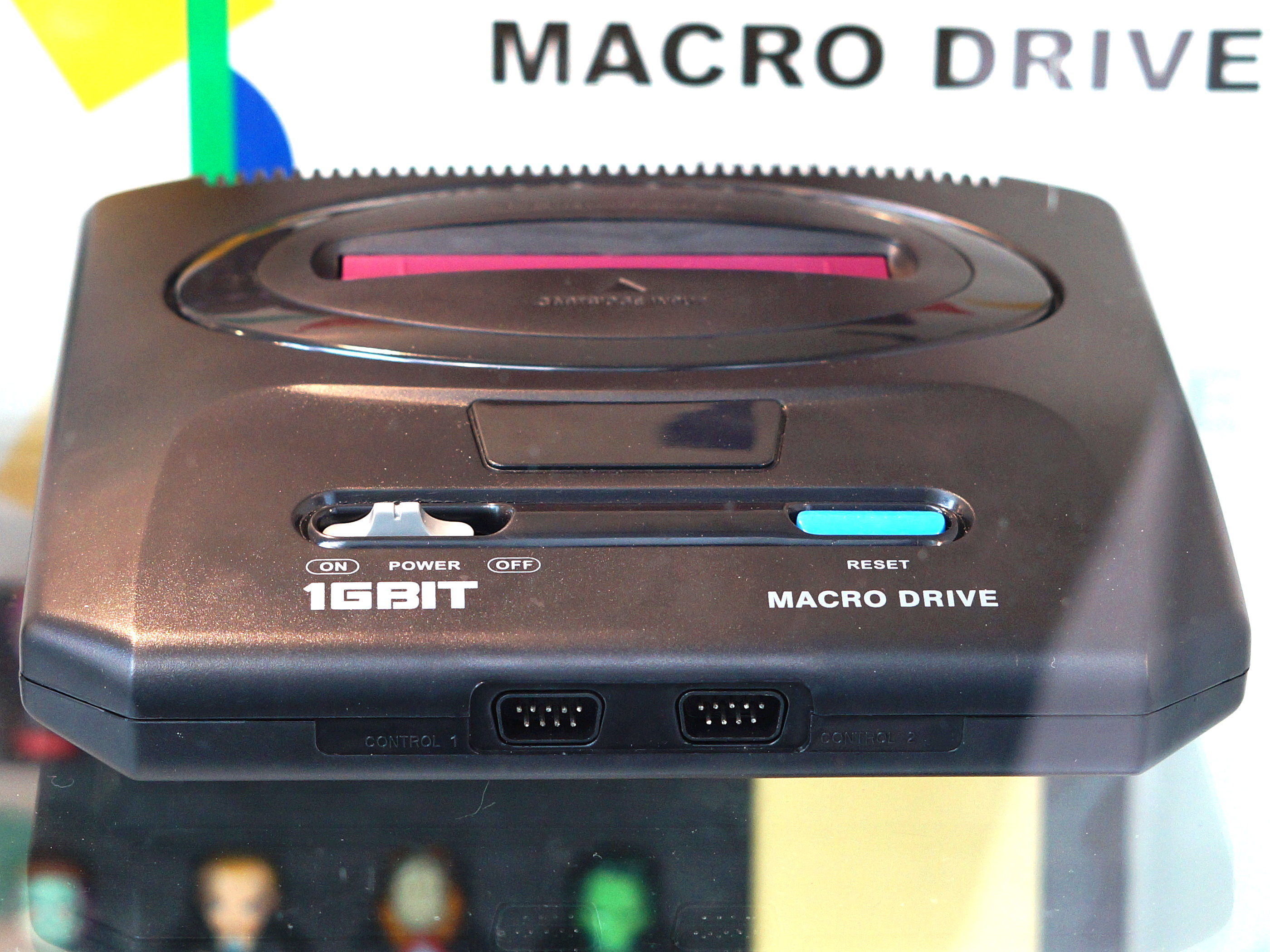
GA-3060

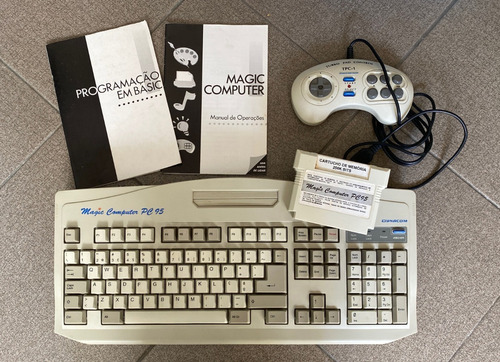
Magic Computer PC-95

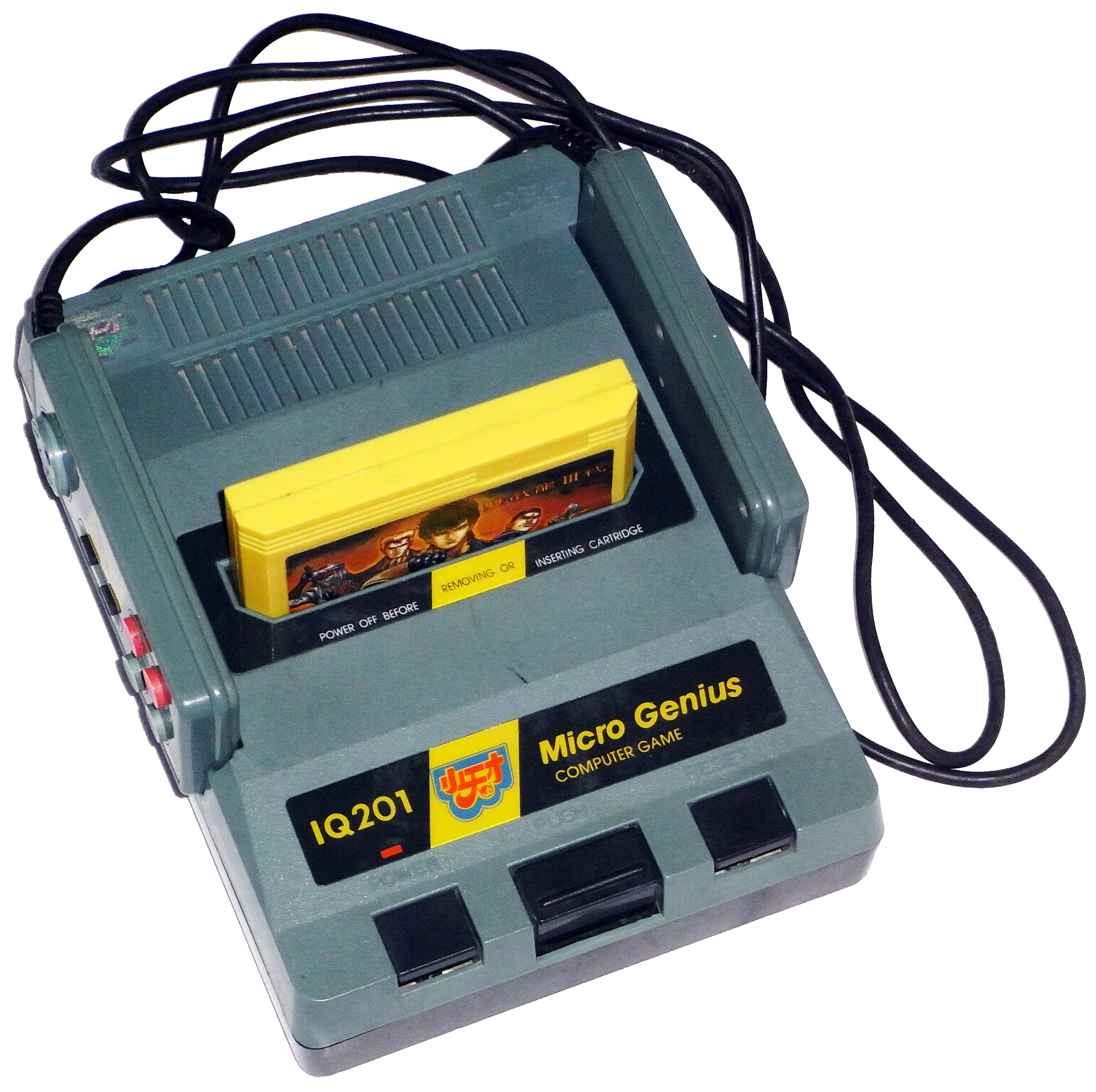
Micro Genius IQ-201

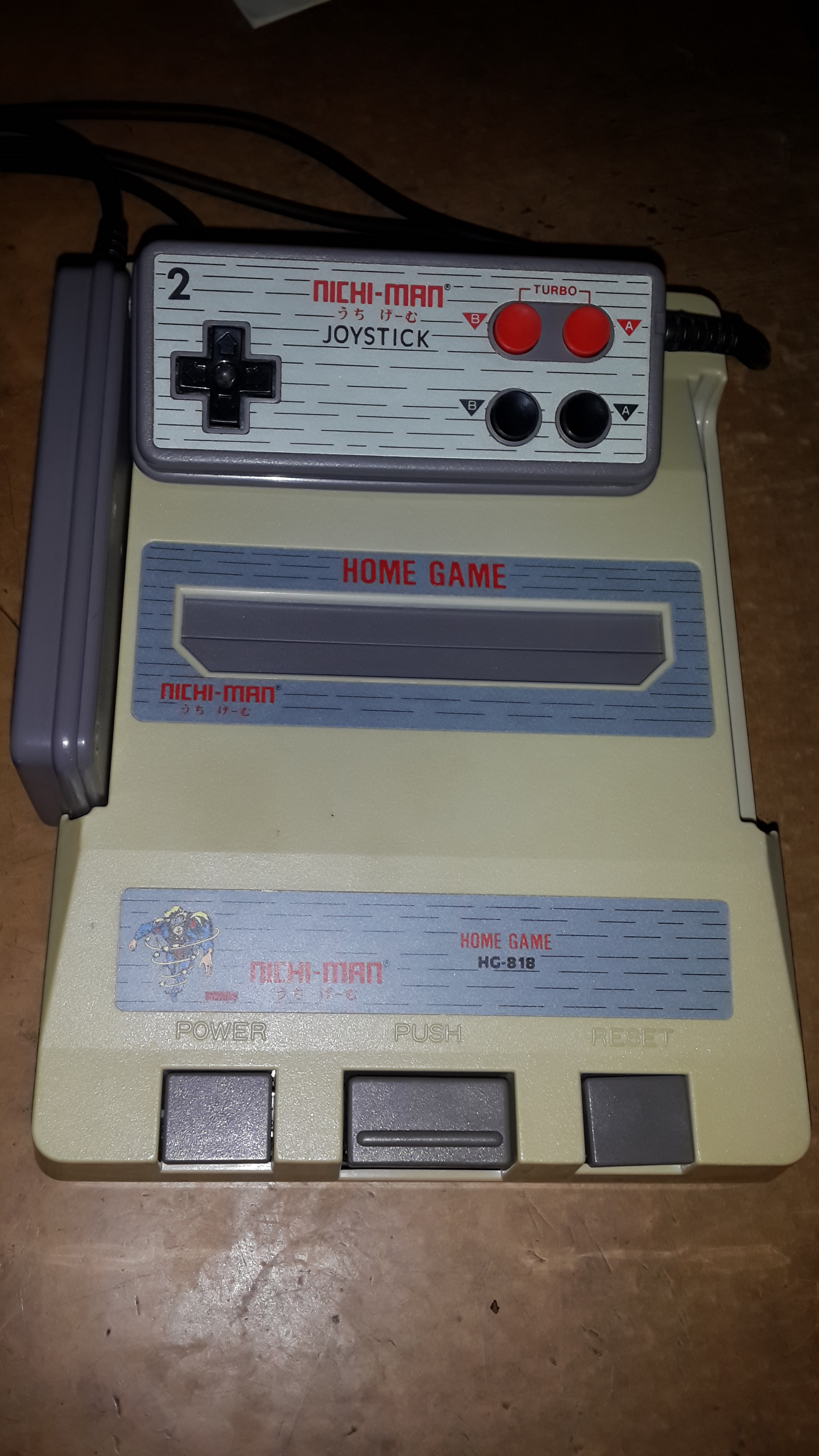
Nichi-man

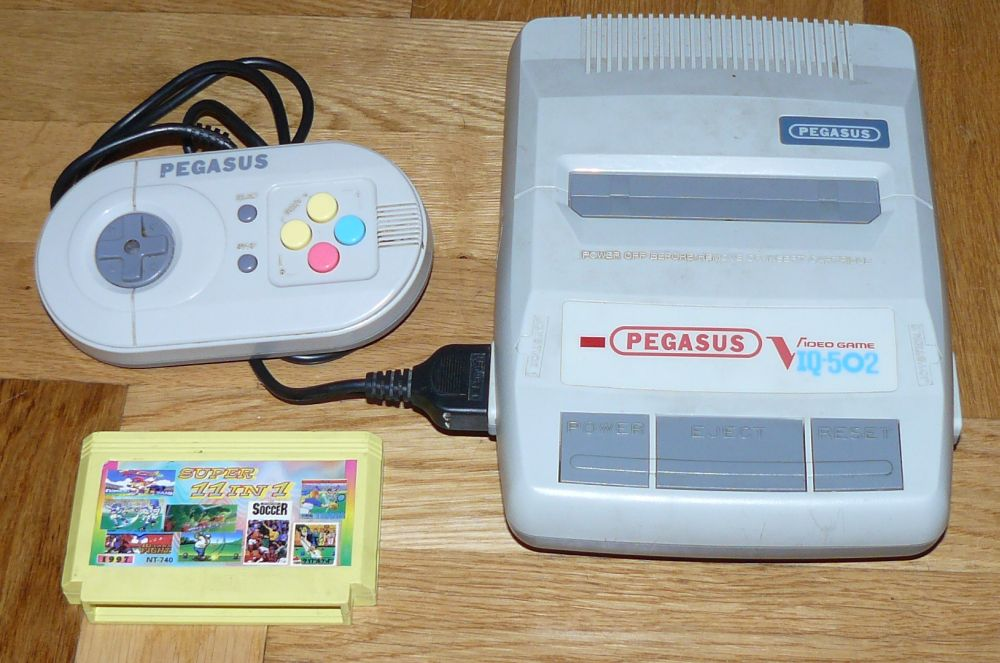
Pegasus

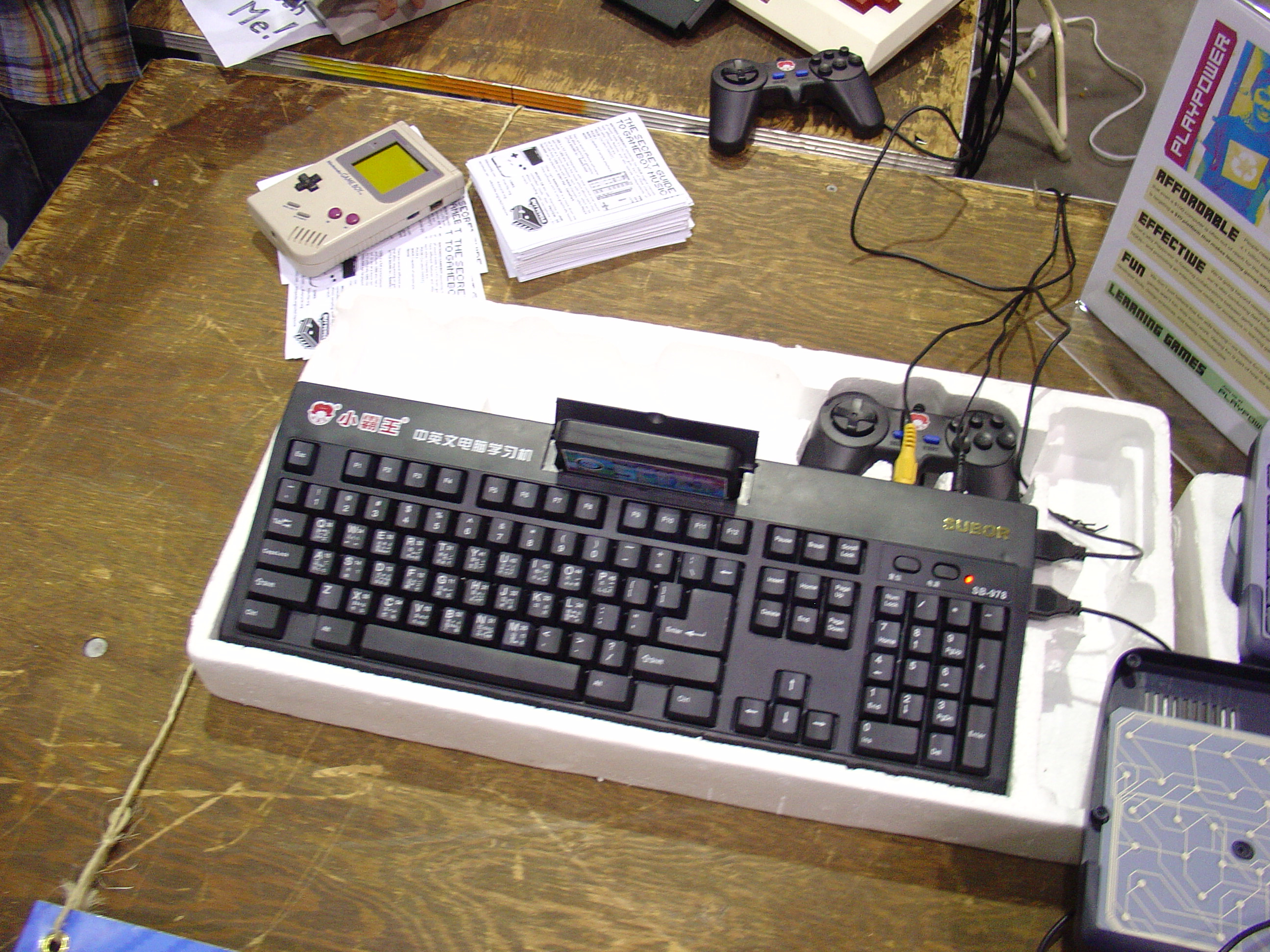
Subor SB 978

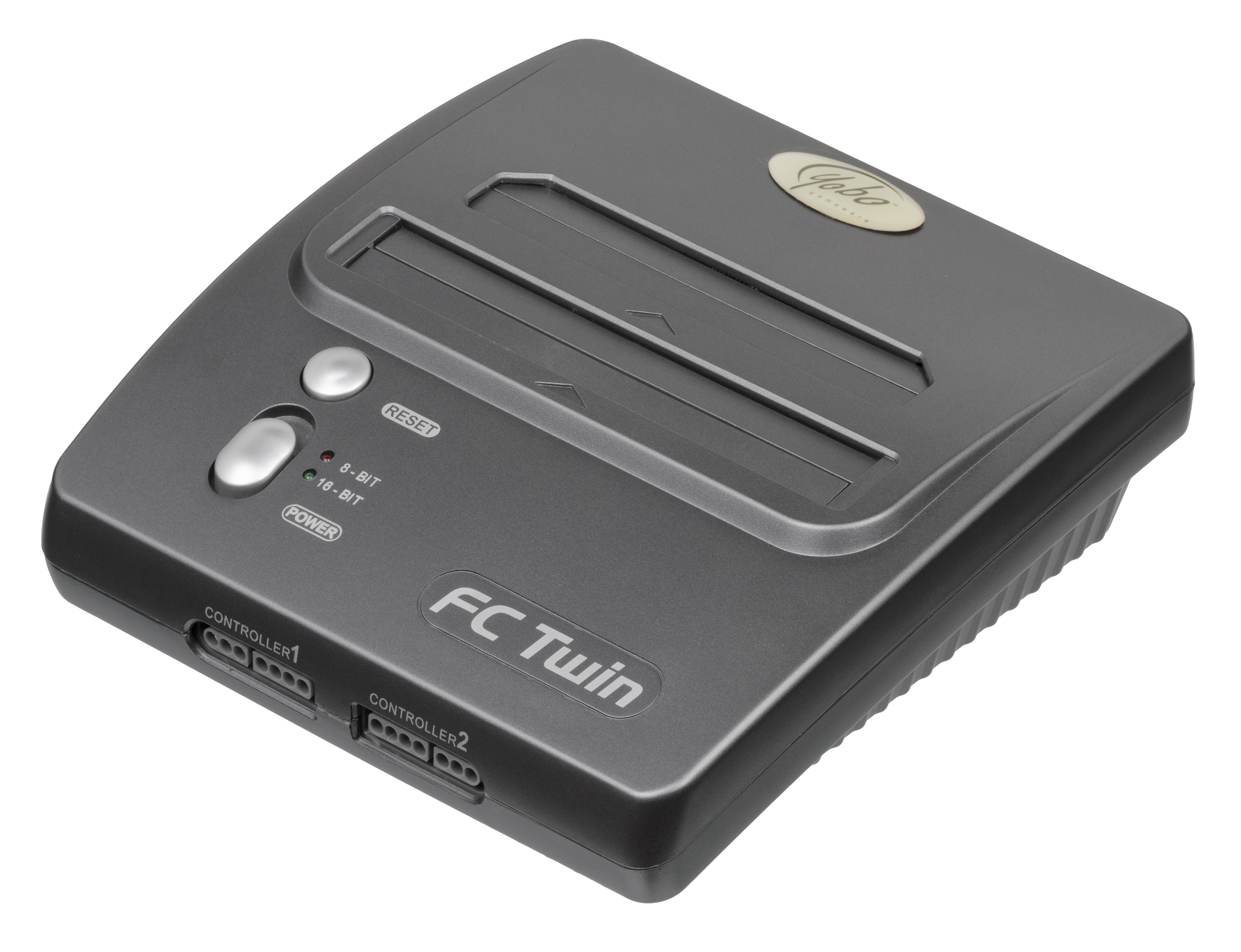
FC Twin

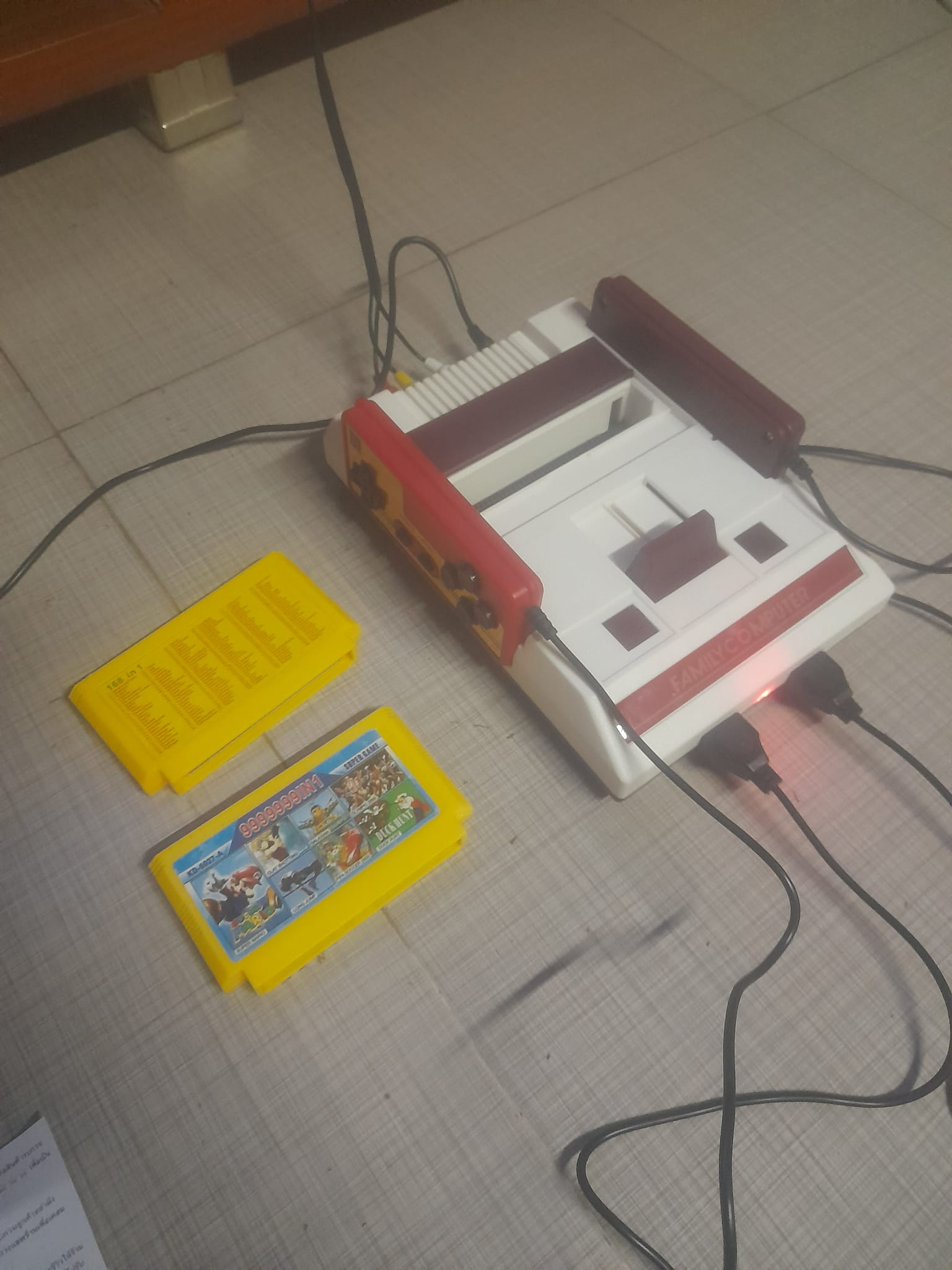
FC Compact

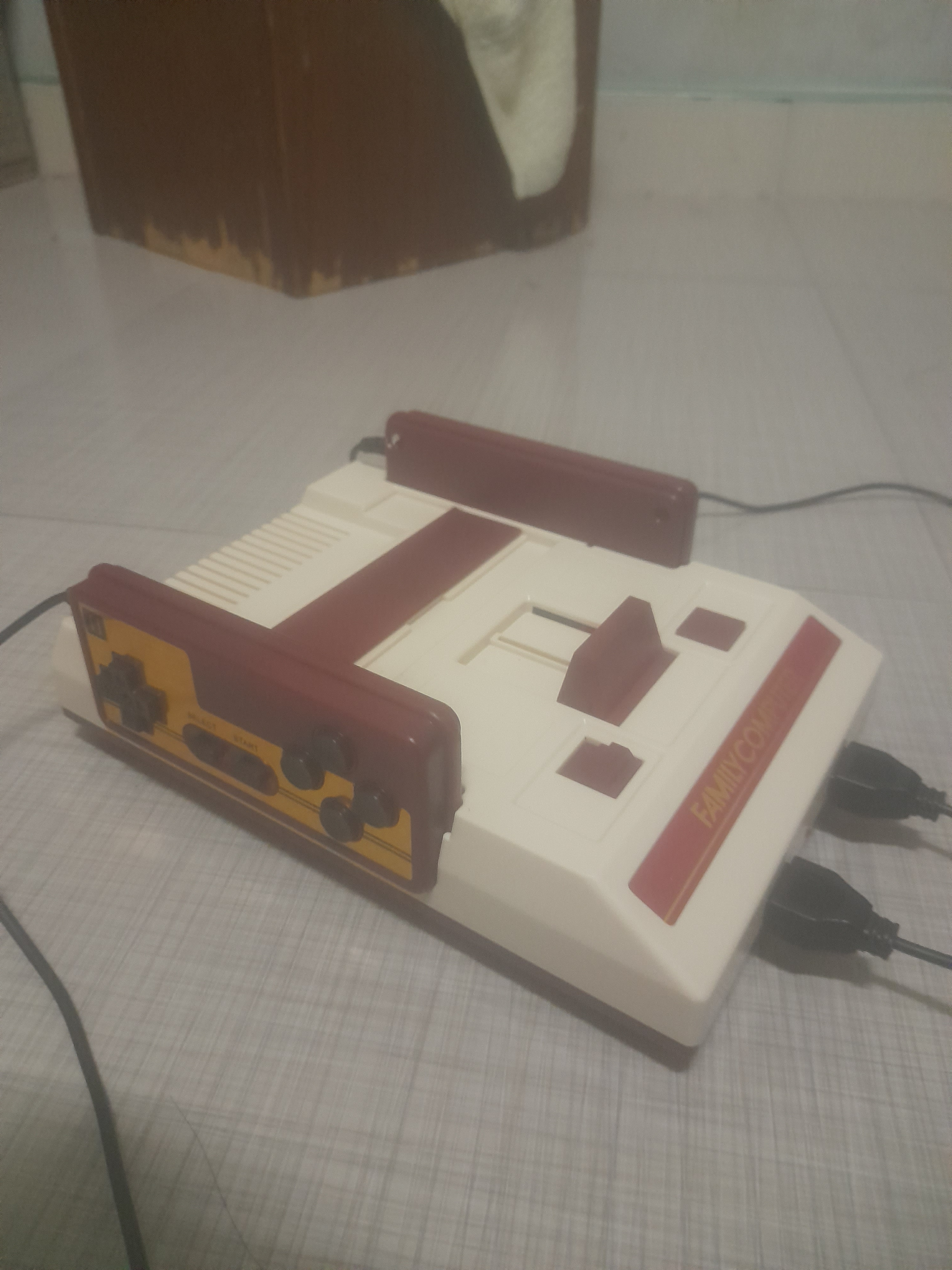
FC Compact with built-in 500 games

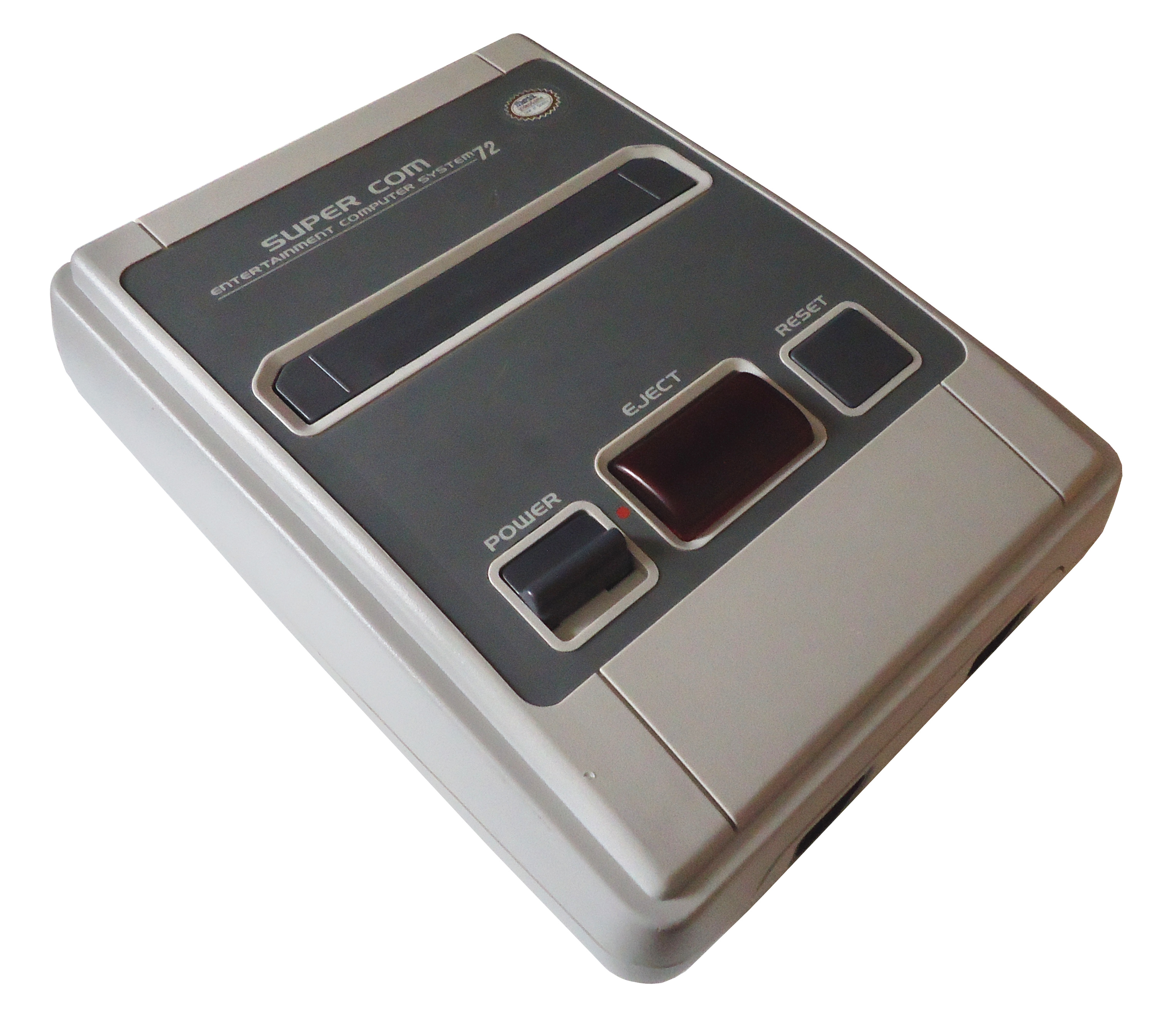
Super Com SP-60 called also Super Com SP-72

== See also ==
- Analogue Nt
- Micro Genius
- Power Player Super Joy III
- PolyStation
- PlayPower
- Video game console emulator
