= List of SpongeBob SquarePants merchandise =

SpongeBob SquarePants merchandise, such as VHS tapes, DVDs, CDs, video games, books, and toys, includes the following:

== Games ==
=== Board and card games ===
- SpongeBob SquarePants Trading Card Game
- Monopoly SpongeBob SquarePants Edition
- Uno
  - SpongeBob SquarePants
  - SpongeBob SquarePants: Special Edition
  - SpongeBob SquarePants: Lost in Time
  - SpongeBob SquarePants: Eye-Eye Game
  - SpongeBob SquarePants: My First
- The Game of Life Bikini Bottom SpongeBob SquarePants Edition
- Hangman SpongeBob Edition
- Ants in the Pants SpongeBob Edition (Ants in the Square Pants)
- Operation SpongeBob Edition
- Connect Four SpongeBob Edition
- Sorry! SpongeBob SquarePants Edition
- Cranium SpongeBob SquarePants
- SpongeBob SquarePants: Memory Game
- SpongeBob SquarePants Game
  - Great Jellyfish Escape
  - A Wacky Race to the Krusty Krab
  - The clam catch
- Guess Who? SpongeBob SquarePants Edition

=== DVD games ===
- SpongeBob SquarePants Fact or Fishy
- Scene It? Nickelodeon Edition

== Albums ==
Title	Released
SpongeBob SquarePants: Original Theme Highlights	August 14, 2001
The SpongeBob SquarePants Movie – Music from the Movie and More...	November 9, 2004
The Yellow Album	November 15, 2005
The Best Day Ever	September 12, 2006
The Sponge Who Could Fly	May 11, 2007
SpongeBob's Greatest Hits	July 14, 2009
It's a SpongeBob Christmas! Album	November 6, 2012
Music from "The SpongeBob Movie: Sponge Out of Water" EP	January 27, 2015
The SpongeBob Movie: Sponge Out of Water (Original Motion Picture Score)	March 24, 2015
SpongeBob SquarePants: The New Musical (Original Cast Recording)	September 22, 2017

== Books ==
#	Title	Publication date	ISBN
1	SpongeBob SquarePants Joke Book	September 1, 2000	ISBN 978-0-613-31744-3
2	SpongeBob SquarePants Trivia Book	September 1, 2000	ISBN 978-0-689-84018-0
3	Blast Off, Splash Down!	February 26, 2001	ISBN 978-0-307-21692-2
4	SpongeBob SquarePants Flip Book	April 3, 2001	ISBN 978-0-689-84465-2
5	A Christmas Coral	July 1, 2001	ISBN 978-0-307-29055-7
6	They Blow Up So Fast	May 14, 2002	ISBN 978-0-307-27635-3
7	Bottom's Up! Jokes from Bikini Bottom	October 1, 2002	ISBN 978-0-689-85181-0
8	SpongeBob Jokepants	January 1, 2003	ISBN 978-0-613-58155-4
9	Don't Rock the Boat	January 2003	ISBN 978-0-307-10392-5
10	Fish Happens!	September 1, 2003	ISBN 978-0-689-85996-0
11	The SpongeBob SquarePants Oracle	November 1, 2003	ISBN 978-0-7434-8316-2
12	Ready for Laughs!: A Treasury of Undersea Humor	January 6, 2004	ISBN 978-0-689-86782-8
13	SpongeBob Pops Up!	June 1, 2004	ISBN 978-0-689-86328-8
14	Grand Prize Winner!	June 2004	ISBN 978-1-4127-0144-0
15	SpongeBob SpookyPants	September 1, 2004	ISBN 978-0-689-87320-1
16	SpongeBob Exposed!: The Insider's Guide to SpongeBob SquarePants	September 21, 2004	ISBN 978-0-689-86870-2
17	SpongeBob's Best Day Ever	October 4, 2004	ISBN 978-0-689-86754-5
18	SpongeBob's Book of Excuses	January 6, 2005	ISBN 978-0-689-87211-2
19	Wheel of Wishes	January 25, 2005	ISBN 978-0-689-87420-8
20	Go, Graduate!: All the Best from Bikini Bottom	March 22, 2005	ISBN 978-1-4169-0291-1
21	Bikini Bottom Riddles	March 22, 2005	ISBN 978-0-689-87875-6
22	SpongeBob SantaPants	October 4, 2005	ISBN 978-1-4169-0575-2
23	Oh, Barnacles!: SpongeBob's Handbook for Bad Days	October 25, 2005	ISBN 978-1-4169-0641-4
24	Jokes from the Krusty Krab	November 29, 2005	ISBN 978-1-4169-0652-0
25	Nautical Nonsense: A SpongeBob Joke Book	March 7, 2006	ISBN 978-1-4169-1316-0
26	SpongeBob DetectivePants: The Case of the Missing Spatula	July 1, 2006	ISBN 978-1-4169-1319-1
27	SpongeBob PartyPants	February 6, 2007	ISBN 978-1-4169-2776-1
28	Yo-Ho-Ha-Ha-Ha!: A Pirate Joke Book	April 24, 2007	ISBN 978-1-4169-3604-6
29	Scared Silly!: SpongeBob's Book of Spooky Jokes	August 7, 2007	ISBN 978-1-4169-4735-6
30	The Krabby Patty Special (with Extra Plankton)	August 28, 2007	ISBN 978-1-4169-3666-4
31	SpongeBob RippedPants	September 18, 2007	ISBN 978-1-4169-4750-9
32	Chuckle and Cringe: SpongeBob's Book of Embarrassing Stories	November 27, 2007	ISBN 978-1-4169-4746-2
33	Blizzard Buster!: SpongeBob's Book of Frosty Funnies	January 8, 2008	ISBN 978-1-4169-4747-9
34	SpongeBob DetectivePants: The Case of the Vanished Squirrel	March 25, 2008	ISBN 978-1-4352-1163-6
35	Spongezilla Attacks!	August 5, 2008	ISBN 978-1-4169-5548-1
36	For Singing Out Loud!: SpongeBob's Book of Showstopping Jokes	December 16, 2008	ISBN 978-1-4169-5351-7
37	SpongeBob Goes Green!: An Earth-Friendly Adventure	January 6, 2009	ISBN 978-1-4169-4985-5
38	Good Ideas... and Other Disasters	February 24, 2009	ISBN 978-1-4169-6086-7
39	My Happy Book: SpongeBob's 10 Happiest Moments	September 1, 2009	ISBN 978-1-4169-8344-6
40	SpongeBob's Hearty Valentine	December 22, 2009	ISBN 978-1-4169-9021-5
41	The Eye of the Fry Cook: A Story About Getting Glasses	December 29, 2009	ISBN 978-1-4169-9453-4
42	SpongeBob to the Rescue: A Trashy Tale About Recycling	March 9, 2010	ISBN 978-1-4169-9592-0
43	SpongeBob, Soccer Star!	April 6, 2010	ISBN 978-1-4169-9445-9
44	Crash Course!	August 24, 2010	ISBN 978-1-4424-0173-0
45	The Great Patty Caper	September 21, 2010	ISBN 978-1-4424-0781-7
46	Christmas with Krabby Klaws	October 5, 2010	ISBN 978-1-4424-0805-0
47	Batter Up, SpongeBob!	January 4, 2011	ISBN 978-1-4424-1379-5
48	Legends of Bikini Bottom	January 4, 2011	ISBN 978-1-4424-1340-5
49	Where'd It Go?: A Pop-Up Book	February 22, 2011	ISBN 978-1-4424-1242-2
50	Bring on the Funny!: A Collection of SpongeBob Jokes	July 26, 2011	ISBN 978-1-4424-0187-7
51	Behind the Mask!	July 26, 2011	ISBN 978-1-4424-2067-0
52	SpongeBob's Runaway Road Trip	August 30, 2011	ISBN 978-1-4424-2997-0
53	The Adventures of Man Sponge and Boy Patrick: Goodness, Man Ray!	September 6, 2011	ISBN 978-1-4424-2744-0
54	The Adventures of Man Sponge and Boy Patrick: What Were You Shrinking?	September 6, 2011	ISBN 978-1-4424-3102-7
55	SpongeBob DetectivePants: The Case of the Ruined Sign	September 6, 2011	ISBN 978-1-4424-2861-4
56	SpongeBob DetectivePants: The Case of the Lost Shell	September 6, 2011	ISBN 978-1-4424-2833-1
57	Go, Team SpongeBob!	September 20, 2011	ISBN 978-1-4424-2319-0
58	SpongeBob Tees Off	January 24, 2012	ISBN 978-1-4424-3617-6
59	The Adventures of Man Sponge and Boy Patrick: E.V.I.L. vs. the I.J.L.S.A.	February 21, 2012	ISBN 978-1-4424-3584-1

=== 8x8 series ===
#	Title	Basis episode	Publication date	ISBN
1	The Amazing SpongeBobini	N/A	June 1, 2003	ISBN 978-0-689-85602-0
2	Hands Off!	"The Secret Box"	June 1, 2003	ISBN 978-0-613-66358-8
3	SpongeBob's Secret Valentine	N/A	December 23, 2003	ISBN 978-0-689-86326-4
4	And the Winner Is...	"Big Pink Loser"	January 6, 2004	ISBN 978-0-689-86327-1
5	SpongeBob and the Princess	N/A	May 25, 2004	ISBN 978-1-4176-9054-1
6	The Great Snail Race	"The Great Snail Race"	January 25, 2005	ISBN 978-0-689-87313-3
7	SpongeBob's Easter Parade	N/A	January 25, 2005	ISBN 978-0-689-87314-0
8	Stop the Presses	"The Krabby Kronicle"	September 27, 2005	ISBN 978-1-4177-3055-1
9	SpongeBob Goes to the Doctor	"Suds"	October 1, 2005	ISBN 978-1-4177-3054-4
10	Lost in Time: A Medieval Adventure	"Dunces and Dragons"	January 31, 2006	ISBN 978-1-4169-1464-8
11	Class Confusion	N/A	June 20, 2006	ISBN 978-1-4169-1239-2
12	The Art Contest: No Cheating Allowed!	N/A	July 31, 2006	ISBN 978-1-4169-0667-4
13	A Very Krusty Christmas	Christmas Who?	October 3, 2006	ISBN 978-1-4169-1759-5
14	Hooray for Dads!	N/A	April 30, 2007	ISBN 978-1-4169-2782-2
15	Behold, No Cavities!: A Visit to The Dentist	N/A	July 31, 2007	ISBN 978-1-4169-3566-7
16	Atlantis SquarePants	"SpongeBob's Atlantis SquarePantis"	October 9, 2007	ISBN 978-1-4169-3799-9
17	Vote for SpongeBob	N/A	January 31, 2008	ISBN 978-1-4169-4986-2
18	WhoBob WhatPants?	WhoBob WhatPants?	September 9, 2008	ISBN 978-1-4169-6736-1
19	SpongeBob's Slap Shot	N/A	September 30, 2008	ISBN 978-1-4169-6153-6
20	Surf's Up, SpongeBob!	SpongeBob vs. The Big One	March 10, 2009	ISBN 978-0-606-06273-2
21	SpongeBob RoundPants	To SquarePants or Not to SquarePants	June 9, 2009	ISBN 978-0-606-06242-8
22	The Great Escape	Truth or Square	September 8, 2009	ISBN 978-0-545-19754-0
23	The Eye of the Fry Cook	N/A	December 29, 2009	ISBN 978-1-416-99453-4
24	Spongebob to the Rescue!	N/A	March 9, 2010	ISBN 978-1-416-99592-0
25	Spongebob Soccer Star!	N/A	April 6, 2010	ISBN 978-1-416-99445-9

=== Chapter book series ===
#	Title	Basis episode	Publication date	ISBN
1	Tea at the Treedome	"Tea at the Treedome"	September 1, 2000	ISBN 978-0-689-84015-9
2	Naughty Nautical Neighbors	"Naughty Nautical Neighbors"	September 1, 2000	ISBN 978-0-689-84016-6
3	Hall Monitor	"Hall Monitor"	November 1, 2000	ISBN 978-0-689-84042-5
4	The World's Greatest Valentine	"Valentine's Day"	January 1, 2001	ISBN 978-0-689-84043-2
5	SpongeBob Superstar	N/A	March 1, 2001	ISBN 978-0-689-84174-3
6	Sandy's Rocket	"Sandy's Rocket"	May 1, 2001	ISBN 978-0-613-43971-8
7	SpongeBob NaturePants	"Nature Pants"	August 1, 2001	ISBN 978-0-689-84194-1
8	SpongeBob Airpants: The Lost Episode	"The Sponge Who Could Fly"	September 1, 2003	ISBN 978-0-613-97747-0
9	New Student Starfish	"New Student Starfish"	September 1, 2003	ISBN 978-0-689-86164-2
10	Zoo Day Disaster	"The Smoking Peanut"	June 28, 2005	ISBN 978-0-689-87710-0
11	Mother Knows Best	"Grandma's Kisses"	March 28, 2006	ISBN 978-1-4169-0793-0
12	For the Love of Bubbles	"WhoBob WhatPants?"	September 12, 2006	ISBN 978-1-4169-1633-8
13	Where's Gary?	"Have You Seen This Snail?"	April 24, 2007	ISBN 978-1-4169-4071-5
14	Pirates of Bikini Bottom	"Grandpappy The Pirate"	May 8, 2007	ISBN 978-1-4169-3560-5

=== Cine-manga series ===
#	Title	Basis episodes	ISBN
1	Krusty Krab Adventures	"The Algae's Always Greener", "Culture Shock", "Pizza Delivery", "Pickles"	ISBN 978-1-59182-398-8
2	Friends Forever	"SpongeGuard on Duty", "Mermaid Man and Barnacle Boy", "Naughty Nautical Neighbors", "Wet Painters"	ISBN 978-1-59182-399-5
3	Tales from Bikini Bottom	"F.U.N.", "Pre-Hibernation Week", "I'm Your Biggest Fanatic", "Home Sweet Pineapple"	ISBN 978-1-59182-575-3
4	Crime and Funishment (aka Bikini Bottom's Most Wanted)	"Life of Crime", "Nasty Patty", "No Free Rides", "Mermaid Man and Barnacle Boy V"	ISBN 978-1-59182-576-0
5	Another Day, Another Sand Dollar	“Help Wanted”, “Bubblestand”, "Graveyard Shift", "The Fry Cook Games"	ISBN 978-1-59532-209-8
6	Gone Jellyfishin	"Tea at the Treedome", "Jellyfishing", "Jellyfish Jam", "Jellyfish Hunter"	ISBN 978-1-59532-678-2
7	SpongeBob Saves the Day	"Plankton", "Hall Monitor", "Krusty Love", "Ripped Pants"	ISBN 978-1-59532-679-9
8	Gone Nutty!	"Pressure", "Sandy's Rocket", "Karate Choppers", "Sandy, SpongeBob, and the Worm"	ISBN 978-1-59532-680-5
9	Meow...Like a Snail?!	"I Was a Teenage Gary", "Dumped", "The Great Snail Race", "Gary Takes a Bath"	ISBN 978-1-59532-681-2
10	Who's Hungry?	"Welcome to the Chum Bucket", "Patty Hype", "Dying for Pie", "Clams"	ISBN 978-1-59532-889-2
11	Mistaken Identity	"Once Bitten", "That's No Lady", "The Thing", "Rule of Dumb"	ISBN 978-1-59532-890-8
12	SpongeBob SquarePants: The Movie	The SpongeBob SquarePants Movie	ISBN 978-1-59532-089-6

=== Ready-to-Read series ===
#	Title	Publication date	ISBN
1	The Big Halloween Scare	September 1, 2003	ISBN 978-0-613-73339-7
2	Special Delivery!	September 1, 2003	ISBN 978-0-689-85887-1
3	Show Me the Bunny!	January 27, 2004	ISBN 978-0-689-86485-8
4	The Song That Never Ends	February 24, 2004	ISBN 978-1-59961-446-5
5	Camp SpongeBob	May 25, 2004	ISBN 978-0-689-86593-0
6	UFO!	January 25, 2005	ISBN 978-0-689-87202-0
7	Happy Birthday, SpongeBob!	May 17, 2005	ISBN 978-0-689-87674-5
8	Hoedown Showdown	January 3, 2006	ISBN 978-1-4169-0689-6
9	SpongeBob Rocks!	May 9, 2006	ISBN 978-1-4169-1314-6
10	SpongeBob LovePants	December 26, 2006	ISBN 978-1-4169-1758-8
11	Just Say "Please!"	March 27, 2007	ISBN 978-1-4169-4129-3
12	My Trip to Atlantis by SpongeBob SquarePants	September 11, 2007	ISBN 978-1-4169-3794-4
13	The Big Win	June 3, 2008	ISBN 978-1-4169-4938-1
14	My Name Is Cheesehead	September 16, 2008	ISBN 978-1-4169-6863-4
15	Man Sponge Saves the Day	January 27, 2009	ISBN 978-1-4169-5936-6
16	Good Times	September 8, 2009	ISBN 978-1-4169-8500-6
17	The Best Mom	March 23, 2010	ISBN 978-1-4169-9675-0
18	The Great Train Mystery	September 21, 2010	ISBN 978-1-4424-0782-4
19	The Bikini Bottom Bike Race	January 25, 2011	ISBN 978-1-4424-1343-6
20	Attack of the Zombies!	June 28, 2011	ISBN 978-1-4424-2087-8
21	Dancing with the Star	January 3, 2012	ISBN 978-1-4424-4162-0

=== The SpongeBob SquarePants Movie series ===
#	Title	Publication date	ISBN
1	Bubble Blowers, Beware!	September 21, 2004	ISBN 978-0-689-86862-7
2	Hold Your Sea Horses	September 21, 2004	ISBN 978-0-375-82895-9
3	Ice-Cream Dreams	September 21, 2004	ISBN 978-0-689-86861-0
4	Road Trip	September 21, 2004	ISBN 978-0-689-87382-9
5	The SpongeBob SquarePants Movie: A Novelization of the Hit Movie!	September 21, 2004	ISBN 978-0-689-86840-5

=== SpongeBob SquarePants Stickerbooks ===
#	Title	Publisher	Publication date	UPC (PLU)
1	SpongeBob SquarePants	Panini	August 9, 2011	6-13297-74629-4

There are at least 8 more sticker albums not listed

== Toys ==
=== Leapfrog books and games ===
- SpongeBob SquarePants Saves the Day (Leapster)
- SpongeBob SquarePants: Fists of Foam (Didj and Leapster Explorer)
- SpongeBob SquarePants: The Tour de Bikini Bottom (Tag)
- SpongeBob SquarePants: Through the Wormhole (Leapster)
- SpongeBob SquarePants: The Clam Prix (Leapster Explorer)
- SpongeBob SquarePants: Salty Sea Stories (LeapPad)

=== TY Beanie Babies ===
- Captain SpongeBob
- First Mate Patrick
- Gary the Snail
- Mr. Krabs
- Muscle Man Star
- MuscleBob BuffPants
- Patrick Barnacleboy
- Patrick Claus
- Patrick Star Best Day Ever
- Sheldon J. Plankton
- SpongeBob Best Day Ever
- SpongeBob Birthday
- SpongeBob FrankenStein
- SpongeBob JingleBells
- SpongeBob JollyElf
- SpongeBob Mermaidman
- SpongeBob PinkPants
- SpongeBob PumpkinMask
- SpongeBob QB
- SpongeBob SleighRide
- SpongeBob SquarePants
- SpongeBob ThumbsUp
- SpongeBob TuxedoPants
- Squidward Tentacles

=== Lego SpongeBob SquarePants ===
Lego SpongeBob SquarePants (stylized as LEGO SpongeBob SquarePants) is a Lego theme based on SpongeBob SquarePants.

Lego sets of SpongeBob SquarePants
Reference	Name	Released	Pieces	Minifigures
3825	The Krusty Krab	2006	286	3
3826	Build-A-Bob	2006	445	0
3827	Adventures in Bikini Bottom	2006	570	3
4981	The Chum Bucket	2007	334	1
4982	Mrs. Puff's Boating School	2007	385	3
3830	The Bikini Bottom Express	2008	200	3
3831	Rocket Ride	2008	268	3
3832	The Emergency Room	2008	227	3
3833	Krusty Krab Adventures	2009	200	3
3834	Good Neighbors at Bikini Bottom	2009	416	3
3815	Heroic Heroes of The Deep	2011	77	3
3816	Glove World	2011	154	4
3817	The Flying Dutchman	2012	229	3
3818	Bikini Bottom Undersea Party	2012	459	4
11386	Bikini Bottom (LEGO Icons)	2026	1794	3

=== Masterpiece Memes ===
In April 2019, Nickelodeon released Masterpiece Memes, a series of toys adapted from various SpongeBob Internet memes.

Name	Release date
Handsome Squidward	April 2019
Imaginaaation SpongeBob	April 2019
Mocking SpongeBob	April 2019
SpongeGar	April 2019
Surprised Patrick	April 2019
