= LeapFrog Epic =

Android-based mini-tablet computer

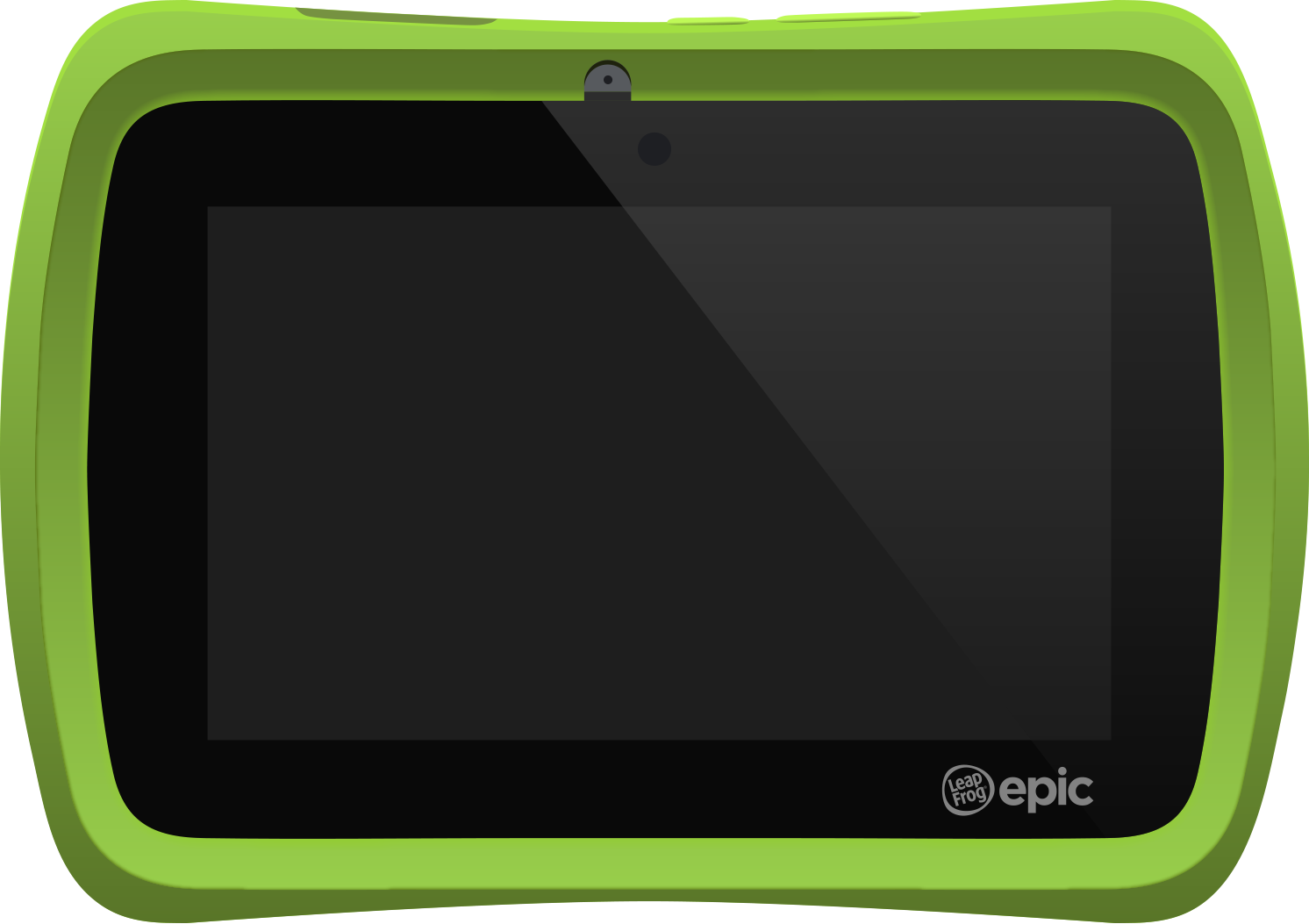
- LeapFrog Epic in lime green
- Also known as: Narnia (codename)
- Developer: LeapFrog Enterprises
- Manufacturer: Quanta Computer
- Type: Tablet
- Released: September 2015
- Introductory price: $139
- Operating system: Android 4.4.2 "KitKat" (Epic, Epic Academy Edition and first-generation LeapPad Academy); Android 10 (second-generation LeapPad Academy)
- System on a chip: MediaTek MT8127 (Epic, Epic Academy Edition and first-generation LeapPad Academy); Rockchip RK3326 (second-generation LeapPad Academy)
- CPU: 1.3 GHz quad-core ARM Cortex-A7 (MT8127 models); 1.5 GHz quad-core ARM Cortex-A35 (RK3326 models)
- Memory: 1 GB
- Storage: Flash memory 16 GB and microSD slot
- Display: 1024 × 600 px (aspect ratio 128:75), 7.0 in (18 cm) diagonal, appr. 21 in^{2} (140 cm^{2}) at 170 PPI or 200 PPI
- Graphics: ARM Mali-450 MP4 (MT8127 models); ARM Mali G31 (RK3326 models)
- Sound: speaker, microphone, headset jack
- Input: Multi-touch screen
- Camera: 2 MP camera, 2 MP front-facing camera
- Connectivity: Wi-Fi 802.11b/g/n, Bluetooth 4.0
- Power: 3420 mAh lithium-ion battery
- Online services: LeapFrog App Center; Amazon App Store
- Dimensions: 162.05 mm (6.380 in) (h); 228.6 mm (9.00 in) (w); 25.9 mm (1.02 in) (d)
- Weight: 585.13 g (20.640 oz)
- Website: LeapFrog Epic

The LeapFrog Epic (styled as LeapFrog epic) is an Android-based mini-tablet computer produced and marketed by LeapFrog Enterprises. Released in 2015, the Epic is LeapFrog's first device to run on Android; most of LeapFrog's mobile computing devices for children run on a customized Ångström Linux distribution.

== Name ==
Despite being sold alongside the LeapPad Explorer line of tablets, the original Epic and Academy Edition variants are not marketed as a LeapPad model and is instead referred to in official literature as the LeapFrog Epic, the latter moniker being a backronym for "explore, play, imagine and create", in reference to the Epic's educational nature.

== Features ==
=== Hardware ===
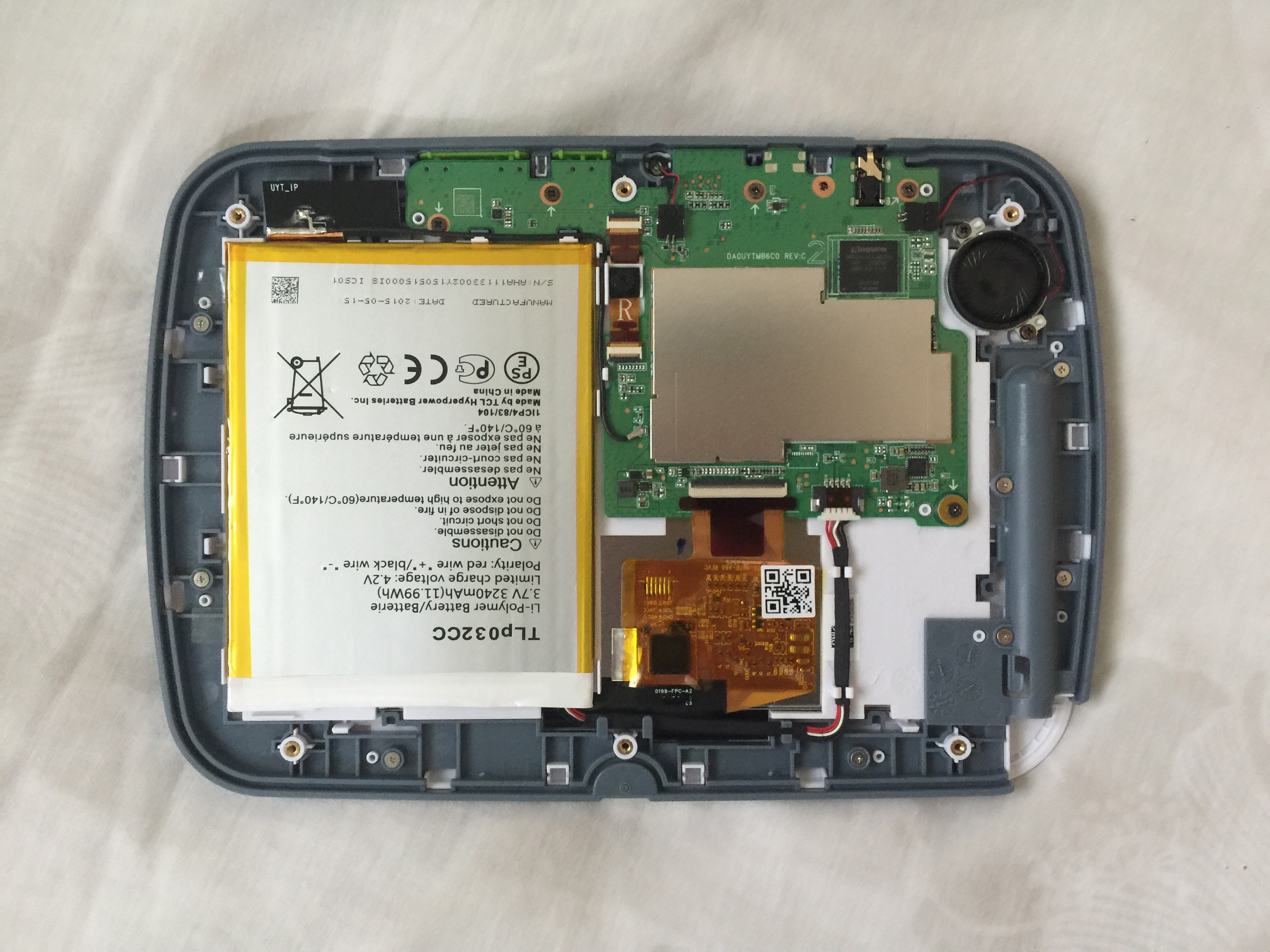
A first-generation LeapFrog Epic with the back cover removed, showing its internal components.

The Epic has a 7-inch (180 mm) TFT-LCD touchscreen, Wi-Fi capability, a 1.3 GHz ARM Cortex-A7 MediaTek MT8127 processor, a 2.0 MP rear-facing camera and a 2.0 MP front-facing camera. As with other devices and toys marketed by the company, the Epic is aimed for children ages 3–9, and like the lower-end LeapPad Explorer line of tablets, edutainment games and applications made specifically for the device automatically adjust to account for the child's grade level. The Epic lacks a cartridge slot, thus making existing cartridge-based software for the LeapPad incompatible; a number of games for the LeapPad series were however ported to the tablet. The Epic also comes standard with a capacitive stylus, replacing the finger in situations where precision is needed, or in apps designed for use with the pen, and a silicone protective case for added shock resistance. The case, which comes in either lime green or pink, can be removed by the user, allowing access to the device's microSD slot.

An updated variant of the Epic called Academy Edition was released in 2017. It is essentially the same hardware as the original Epic, albeit with a redesigned silicone protective bumper and updated firmware with access to the LeapFrog Academy program. Another updated variant called the LeapPad Academy was released in 2019, which, like the Epic Academy Edition before it, came with access to the LeapFrog Academy program and a silicone bumper with a built-in kickstand. In 2021 LeapFrog quietly released a hardware revision of the LeapPad Academy, replacing the MediaTek MT8127 system-on-chip with a Rockchip RK3326; the new revision is otherwise physically identical to earlier units.

=== Software ===
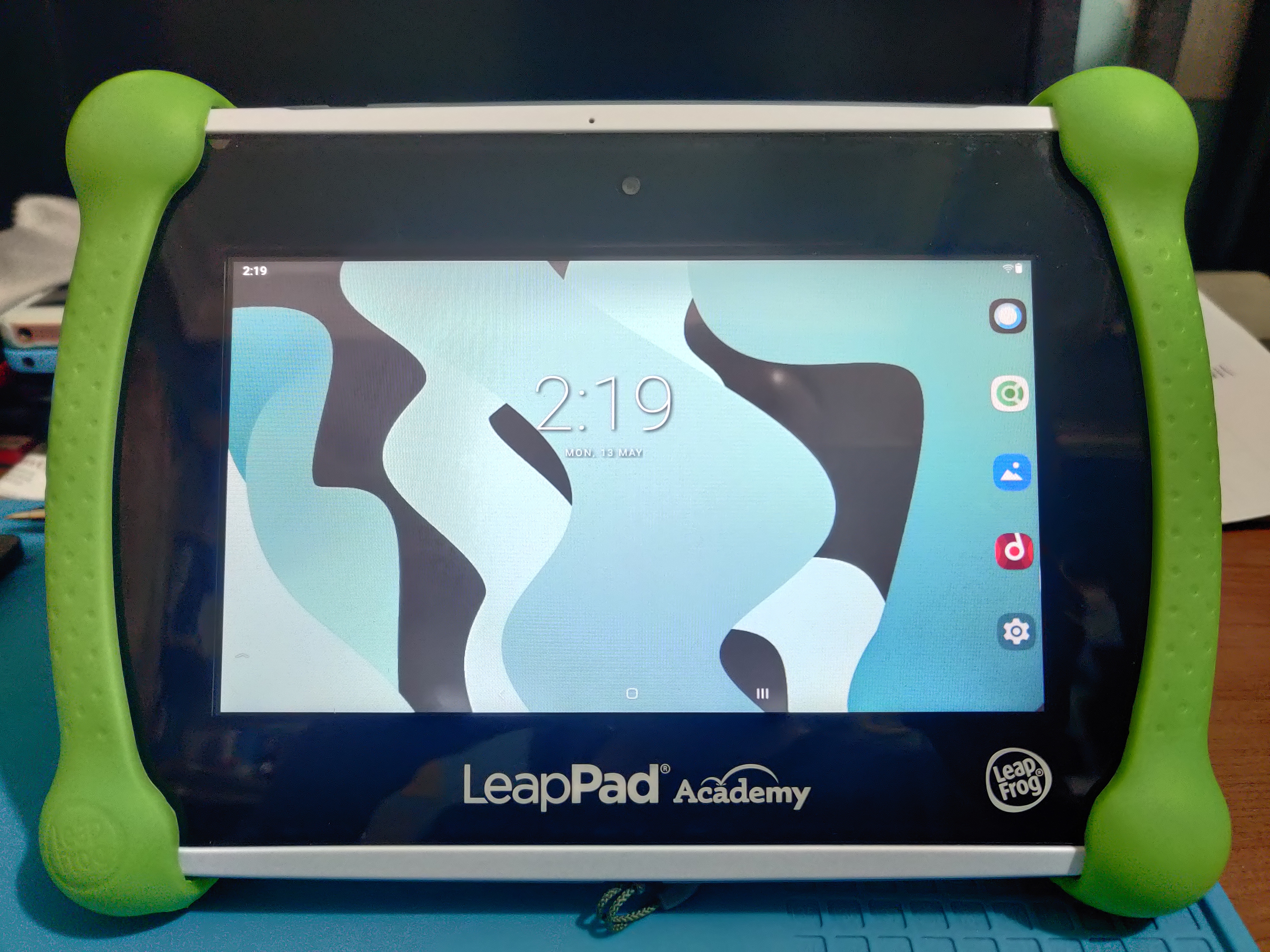
A second-generation LeapPad Academy running LineageOS 18.1. LeapFrog quietly released a hardware revision of the Epic platform in 2021 with a Rockchip RK3326 in place of the MediaTek system-on-chip as with previous models.

The first-generation Epic runs on the Android KitKat operating system, overlaid with LeapFrog's proprietary Kids Launcher UI with support for multiple user profiles and parental controls limiting the time a child can use the device along with content which can be accessed; an unrestricted parent mode is also available along with the stock Android web browser. The initial firmware release only came with support for applications and content purchased from LeapFrog's own App Center, though an update was later made available allowing apps bought or downloaded from the Amazon App Store to be installed.

By default the Epic does not come bundled with Google Play services installed, limiting app selection to the aforementioned App Center and Amazon App Store, along with APK packages sideloaded from outside sources; this can be worked around through rooting the device and copying Google Play components to the system partition, or flashing Google apps through a custom recovery such as TWRP.

While the first-generation Epic has not received a major operating system update since release, it can unofficially run Android 7.1.2 Nougat through a port of LineageOS 14.1 made by members of the xda-developers community. The second-generation LeapPad Academy with the RK3326 system-on-chip on the other hand comes with Android 10 pre-installed along with LeapFrog's Kids Launcher interface.

== Reception ==
=== Accolades ===
The Epic was released to mostly positive reception, earning awards from parenting and educational organizations for its design and features. The device also won the 2017 Award for Best Tablet from the children's media journal Kidscreen.

=== Critical reception ===
Peter Jenkinson of TrustedReviews gave the tablet four out of five stars, praising the form factor and user experience, but bemoaned the downloadable educational games' cost in comparison to apps available on mainstream content platforms. Laptop Mag's Henry T. Casey was less enthusiastic, criticizing the LCD screen quality, the device's weight and performance, stating "the waiting and sluggishness may try the patience of young children", but otherwise remarked the included software and battery life. Jim Martin of PC Advisor was similarly critical of the Epic, criticizing its hardware and viewing the bundled software as having "limited educational value", instead recommending Amazon's Kids Edition Fire tablet.

== See also ==
- List of Android devices
