= Educational games in the Sonic the Hedgehog series =

Edutainment video games

As the Sonic the Hedgehog series of platform games has grown in popularity, its publisher Sega has expanded the franchise into multiple different genres. Among these are several educational video games designed to appeal to young children. The first attempt to create an educational Sonic game was Tiertex Design Studios' Sonic's Edusoft for the Master System in late 1991, which was canceled despite having been nearly finished. When Sega launched the Sega Pico in 1994, it released Sonic the Hedgehog's Gameworld and Tails and the Music Maker for it. BAP Interactive and Orion Interactive also developed the 1996 Sega PC game Sonic's Schoolhouse, which used a 3D game engine and had an exceptionally large marketing budget. In the mid-2000s, LeapFrog Enterprises released educational Sonic games for its Leapster and LeapFrog Didj.

== History ==
Sonic the Hedgehog is one of the bestselling video game franchises ever, selling over 80 million units for the combined series as of 2011. The original game, a side-scrolling platform game, was developed by Sonic Team in Japan. Released by Sega in 1991, it greatly increased the popularity of the Sega Genesis in North America and established Sega as Nintendo's main rival in the console market. With the game's popularity, the series began to expand into other genres. While Sonic the Hedgehog 2 began development in late 1991, the Manchester-based Tiertex Design Studios began to work on an educational video game set in the Sonic universe called Sonic's Edusoft for the Master System. Edusoft was made using sprites ripped from the original game. Despite having been nearly finished, it was canceled. The game was not licensed by Sega, but the company did express interest in it and could have potentially published it jointly with U.S. Gold.

In 1994, Sega released the Sega Pico, an "edutainment" device powered by the same hardware used by the Genesis. The system was designed to appear similar to a laptop, with a stylus called the "Magic Pen", and a pad to draw on. As Sonic had become Sega's mascot, Sega released two educational games featuring characters from the Sonic franchise, Sonic the Hedgehog's Gameworld and Tails and the Music Maker. Gameworld was developed by Aspect Co., the studio that produced the majority of the Game Gear Sonic games. Another educational game, Wacky Worlds Creativity Studio, was released for the Genesis in 1994. Though it is not a Sonic game, Sonic does feature in it.

In 1996, Sega and Orion Interactive collaborated to produce Sonic's Schoolhouse, an educational game in the Sega PC brand for Microsoft Windows. It was developed using a game engine similar to Wolfenstein 3D's and ten educators and psychologists helped create the game's challenges. The game was originally in development as a non-Sonic game titled Answer Hunt which started a cartoon clock, but was replaced with Sonic once Sega saw it and thought that it would do well as an educational Sonic game. Thus, Sonic's Schoolhouse is only tenuously connected to the rest of the franchise. The game was released as part of Sega's US$20 million "Blue is Back" marketing campaign to promote six Sonic games releasing in the holiday shopping season; advertisements for the game were run in magazines and it was promoted in store displays. Sonic's Schoolhouse also came bundled coupons worth US$40 in discounts for Sonic merchandise, including comics and plush toys.

In the mid-2000s, LeapFrog Enterprises published two educational Sonic platformers: Torus Games' Sonic X and Realtime Associates' Sonic the Hedgehog, for the Leapster and LeapFrog Didj, respectively.

In 2026, it was announced that several Sonic games would be launched on the children's educational entertainment platform Lingokids, with five launching on December 3, 2026 and five more in early 2027.

== Games ==
=== Sonic's Edusoft ===
- Release date: Unreleased (developed in 1991)
- Developer: Tiertex Design Studios
- Planned publishers:
  - Sega
  - U.S. Gold
- Platform: Master System

Sonic's Edusoft would have been the first educational Sonic game, the series' third entry overall, and the first Sonic game that was not developed in Japan. The game was aimed at five-year-olds and centers around a series of minigames that feature math and spelling questions. Minigames are accessed from an isometric hub world and more non-educational games can be unlocked after a certain number of educational ones are beaten. The game was virtually unknown until one of the game's programmers created a Wikipedia page about it, which was deleted after being deemed a hoax. The programmer later emailed screenshots to Sonic fansites but was unable to prove it was real. Edusoft was confirmed to be real after its ROM image was eventually leaked.

=== Sonic the Hedgehog's Gameworld ===
- Release date:
  - JP: August 1994
  - NA: October 29, 1996
- Developer: Aspect Co.
- Publisher: Sega
- Platform: Sega Pico

Sonic the Hedgehog's Gameworld was the first of two Sonic games to be released for the Sega Pico. The game takes the form of a picture book and changes the set of tasks the player must accomplish when a page is turned. Aimed at children ages four to seven, Gameworld stars Sonic, Tails, and Amy and features 13 minigames that are designed to teach the player problem solving.

=== Tails and the Music Maker ===
- Release date:
  - NA: September 1994
  - JP: December 5, 1995
- Developer: Realtime Associates
- Publisher: Sega
- Platform: Sega Pico

Tails and the Music Maker was the second Sonic game to be released for the Sega Pico. It features Tails and is designed to teach children ages three to seven about making music. Tails and the Music Maker uses the same picture book form that Gameworld uses. The game features several minigames, including "Travels with Tails" (in which the player guides Tails through three levels) and "Percussion Pinball" (in which Tails is placed in a pinball environment).

=== Sonic's Schoolhouse ===
- Release date:
  - NA: October 18, 1996
- Developer: BAP Interactive, Orion Interactive
- Publisher: Sega Entertainment
- Platform: Microsoft Windows

Sonic's Schoolhouse is aimed at children aged four to nine and takes place in a 3D environment viewed from a first-person perspective. The gameplay has been likened to Doom (1993), but the primary difference is that players must solve spelling, math, and reading questions in several difficulty levels based on age group. Sonic is not playable, acting instead as a guide.

=== Sonic X ===
- Release date:
  - WW: 2007
- Developer: Torus Games
- Publisher: LeapFrog Enterprises
- Platform: Leapster

Sonic X is based on the anime series of the same name and was released by LeapFrog Enterprises for the Leapster handheld game console. It stars Sonic and Chris Thorndyke, a character created for the anime series, who must save Tails, Amy, and Knuckles from Doctor Eggman. The player must guide Sonic through three levels, periodically stopping to answer math questions. The three levels, Station Square, Angel Island, and Eggman's base feature sequences, addition, and subtraction respectively.

=== Sonic the Hedgehog (LeapFrog Didj) ===
- Release date:
  - NA: July 7, 2008
- Developer: Realtime Associates
- Publisher: LeapFrog Enterprises
- Platform: LeapFrog Didj

The Didj version of Sonic the Hedgehog is a side-scrolling platformer similar to the original Genesis Sonic games, but has numerous minigames that are designed to teach spelling. It is aimed at children ages seven to ten.

== Reception ==
Jeuxvideo.com regarded the educational Sonic games as obscure. According to the programmer who worked on Sonic's Edusoft, the game was tested at a primary school in Didsbury, Manchester and was well received. Retro Gamer expressed disappointment that it remained relatively unknown and offered praise for its "chunky" visual style. They also wondered "if the kids realised how lucky they were to get to play an unreleased and often forgotten Sonic game". Reviewing Sonic's Schoolhouse, Hardcore Gaming 101 was strongly negative, calling it "a bare-bones edutainment title" that "offer[s] neither education or entertainment of any sort." They criticized its voice acting, visuals, lack of difficulty and educational value, and poor use of the Sonic license, deeming it a "rather cynical attempt from Sega to tie it in with their mascot" and urging readers to instead play the Leapster games. GamesRadar+ said Sonic's Schoolhouse was only "vaguely educational" and "a grade-schooler's nightmare."

=== Legacy ===
Sonic's Schoolhouse's visuals and design served as an inspiration for the development and creation of Baldi's Basics in Education and Learning, made for the Meta Game Jam in 2018.
