= LeapPad Explorer =

Educational hand-held game console

- Manufacturer: LeapFrog Enterprises
- Product family: LeapPad Tablet Family
- Type: Tablet computer
- Generation: Seventh generation
- Released: August 15, 2011; 14 years ago
- Discontinued: 2014
- Media: LeapFrog Explorer cartridges Digital download
- CPU: ARM9-based processor
- Best-selling game: Globe: Earth Adventures
- Successor: LeapPad2, LeapPad Ultra

LeapPad2
- Manufacturer: LeapFrog Enterprises
- Product family: LeapPad Tablet Family
- Type: Tablet computer
- Generation: Eighth generation
- Released: July 18, 2012; 13 years ago
- Lifespan: NA: 2012
- Media: LeapFrog Explorer cartridges Digital download
- CPU: LeapFrog LF-2000 (NXP3200 SoC) ARM9 @ 550 MHz
- Best-selling game: Learning Path games
- Predecessor: LeapPad Explorer
- Successor: LeapPad3, LeapPad Ultra XDi

The LeapPad Explorer was the first release in a new line of LeapPad products after the discontinuation of the original LeapPad line by LeapFrog Enterprises, Inc. LeapPad Explorer was released on August 15, 2011.

New versions of the LeapPad Explorers were released in July 2012. The update was branded the LeapPad2 and has a higher resolution camera, longer battery life, 4 GB of storage and a LF 2000 processor.

== LeapPad Explorer specs ==
- Built-in 1.2 megapixel camera/video recorder
- 5" touch screen (480x272)
- 2 GB of storage

== LeapPad2 specs ==
- Built-in 2.0 megapixel camera/video recorder
- 4 GB of storage
- LF 2000 processor (550 MHz)

== Awards ==
In 2012, the LeapPad Explorer was awarded 3 titles: "Toy of the Year (overall)", "Educational Toy of the Year" and "Preschool Toy of the Year" at the 12th Annual Toy of the Year Awards, which is held at the American International Toy Fair in New York City.

== List of games licensed ==
- Adventure Sketchers
- Barbie
- Blaze and the Monster Machines
- Brave
- Ben 10: Ultimate Alien
- Bubble Guppies
- Cars 2
- Clifford the Big Red Dog
- Crayola Art Adventure
- Digging for Dinosaurs
- Disney/Pixar's Up
- Disney Princess
- Disney's The Princess and the Frog
- Doc McStuffins
- Doodle Jump
- Dora the Explorer: Dora's Worldwide Rescue
- Finding Dory
- Frozen
- The Good Dinosaur
- Get Puzzled!
- Globe: Earth Adventure
- Hot Wheels
- Hello Kitty: Sweet Little Shops
- I Spy
- Jake and the Never Land Pirates
- Jewel Train
- Kidz Bop
- LeapSchool Math
- LeapSchool Reading
- Letter Factory
- Letter Factory Adventures: The Rainforest
- The Little Mermaid
- The Magic School Bus (Oceans, Dinosaurs, & Dino Shuffle)
- Mini–Game Greatest Hits
- Minnie Mouse Bowtique
- Monsters University
- Moshi Monsters
- Mr. Pencil Saves Doodleburg
- My Little Pony: Friendship Is Magic
- NFL Rush Zone
- Ni Hao, Kai-Lan: Super Happy Day!
- Octonauts
- Olivia
- Paw Patrol
- Pet Pals 2: Best of Friends
- The Penguins of Madagascar: Operation Plushy Rescue
- Phineas and Ferb
- Pixar Pals
- Planes
- Pocoyo
- Scooby-Doo (Pirate Ghost of the Barbary Coast)
- Sesame Street
- SpongeBob SquarePants (Fists of Foam & The Clam Prix)
- Star Wars (Jedi Reading & The Clone Wars)
- Tangled
- Team Umizoomi
- Teenage Mutant Ninja Turtles
- Tinkerbell & Lost Treasure
- Toy Story 3
- Transformers: Rescue Bots (Race to the Rescue)
- Turbo
- Wallykazam!
- Wolverine and the X-Men

== See also ==
- LeapFrog Epic, an Android-based tablet computer developed and marketed by LeapFrog
