= Leapster Explorer =

Handheld game console

- Manufacturer: LeapFrog Enterprises
- Product family: Leapster series
- Type: Handheld game console
- Generation: Seventh generation
- Lifespan: NA: 2010
- Media: Leapster Explorer cartridges Didj cartridges
- CPU: ARM9-based processor
- Predecessor: Leapster2
- Successor: LeapsterGS Explorer

The Leapster Explorer is a handheld console developed and marketed by LeapFrog Enterprises as the third generation of the Leapster series of devices. It is aimed at children aged 4 to 9.

Unlike previous systems in the Leapster series, the Explorer is not compatible with Leapster/L-MAX cartridges, but it can run LeapFrog Didj cartridges.

== Hardware ==
The Leapster Explorer is a Linux device powered by an ARM9-based processor clocked at 393 MHz with 64 MB DDR SDRAM, 512 MB user storage, and a Giantplus touchscreen display.

Like the LeapFrog Didj, but unlike other Leapster-branded game systems, the console has also been a subject to user modification as it runs on an embedded Linux kernel. There has been a number of homebrew software written or ported for the device.

== List of games licensed ==
- Barbie: Malibu Mysteries
- Ben 10: Ultimate Alien
- Brave
- Bubble Guppies
- Cars 2
- Clifford: Ready-to-Read
- Crayola Art Adventure
- Cut the Rope
- Cut the Rope 2
- Digging For Dinosaurs
- Disney Animation Artist: Mickey & Friends
- Disney Princess: Pop-Up Story Adventures
- Doc McStuffins
- Doodle Jump
- Dora the Explorer: Dora's Worldwide Rescue
- Finding Nemo: Reef Builder
- Finding Dory: Mathematical Memories
- Frozen: Special Delivery
- Globe: Earth Adventures
- The Good Dinosaur: Arlo and Spot's Wild Collection
- Hello Kitty: Sweet Little Shops
- Hot Wheels
- I Spy: Super Challenger
- Jake and the Never Land Pirates
- Jewel Train
- Kidz Bop Dance Party!
- The Little Mermaid: Ariel's Princess Adventures
- The Magic School Bus: Dinosaurs
- The Magic School Bus: Oceans
- Minnie Mouse Bowtique: Super Surprise Party
- Monsters University
- Moshi Monsters: School of ROX
- My Little Pony: Friendship Is Magic
- Mr. Pencil: The Lost Colors of Doodleberg
- Ni Hao, Kai-Lan: Super Happy Day
- Octonauts
- Olivia
- Paw Patrol: Ready for Action!
- Peppa Pig: Read and Play with Peppa
- The Penguins of Madagascar: Operation Plushy Rescue
- Pet Pals 2
- Phineas and Ferb: Food Fight Frenzy
- The Pirate Fairy: Pixie Dust Magic
- Pixar Pals
- PJ Masks: Time to Be a Hero
- Planes: Wings Around the Globe
- Pocoyo
- Rusty Rivets: Fix-It Adventures
- Scooby-Doo: Pirate Ghost of the Barbary Coast
- Sesame Street: Solve It with Elmo, Abby, and Super Grover 2.O
- Sesame Street: Elmo Calls
- SpongeBob SquarePants: The Clam Prix
- SpongeBob SquarePants: Fists of Foam
- Star Wars: The Clone Wars
- Star Wars: Jedi Reading
- Tangled
- Team Umizoomi: Umi City Heroes
- Teenage Mutant Ninja Turtles
- Test It 2
- Tinker Bell and the Lost Treasure
- Toca Boca: Science-ish App Collection
- Toca Boca: Style App Collection
- Toca Boca Builders: Kitchen and Town App Collection
- Toy Story 3
- Transformers: Rescue Bots: Race to the Rescue
- Trolls
- Turbo
- Wallykazam!
- Wolverine and the X-Men
