= Robert C. Calfee =

American psychologist

Robert Chilton Calfee (January 26, 1933 – October 23, 2014) was an American educational psychologist specializing in the study of reading and writing processes and instruction. He is known for his work on Project Read and the LeapFrog learning system.

== Early life and education ==
Calfee was born in Lexington, Kentucky, January 26, 1933. He received his B.A. (1959), M.A. (1960) and Ph.D. (1963) from the University of California, Los Angeles.

== Career ==
Calfee started his academic career in the University of Wisconsin–Madison where he taught and conducted research from 1964–1969. In 1969 he moved to Stanford University where he stayed until 1998. During his time at Stanford he was promoted to full professor in 1971 and served in a number of roles including associate dean for research and development, director of the Stanford Teacher Education Program and the Stanford Center for Research in Education.

In 1996, Calfee served on the Commission for the Establishment of Academic Content and Performance Standards.

Calfee was instrumental in the development of LeapFrog reading technology. In 1998, Calfee moved to University of California, Riverside, School of Education where he served as dean (1998–2003) and later distinguished professor. In 2003 he received the Oscar Causey Award for Outstanding Contributions to Reading Research, by the National Reading Conference (now the Literacy Research Association). The National Conference for Research in Language and Literacy awarded him a lifetime achievement award in 2009.

Calfee died of stomach cancer in October 23, 2014 aged 81.

== Publications ==
Calfee authored over 300 articles, book chapters and edited books. Some of the more notable were the Handbook of Educational Psychology with David Berliner, and "Acoustic-phonetic skills and reading: Kindergarten through twelfth grade" with Patricia and Charles Lindamood in the Journal of Educational Psychology.
