= Terminator 2 (console) =

Home video game console

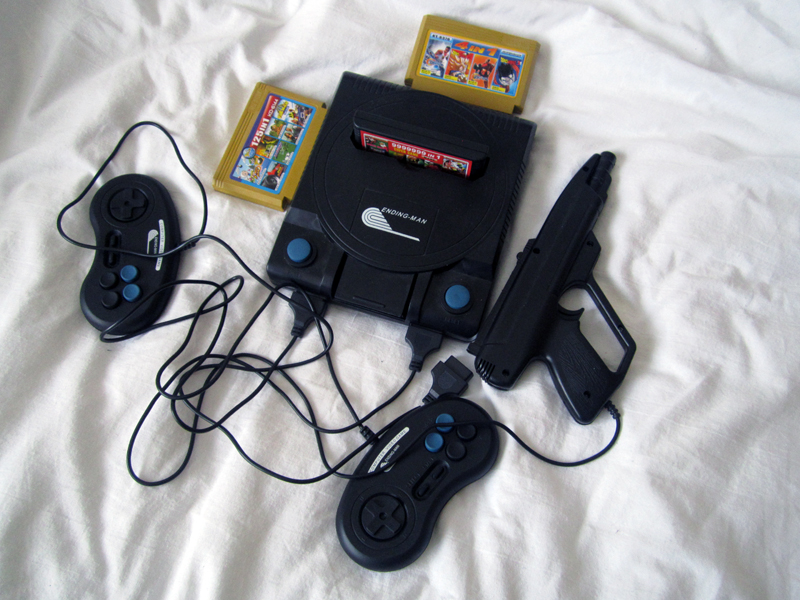
- BS-500 AS (Terminator) with the original controllers, gun and 3 cartridges
- Also known as: 终结者二, Super Design Ending-Man BS-500 AS, Ending-Man S-700, Jippy, Top Console, K-007, Batman/Family Computer II, Retro 8 bit TV console, Terminator 2020
- Manufacturer: Shin Ten Do Co. Ltd, Ending-Man
- Product family: Famicom hardware clone
- Type: Video game console
- Generation: Third
- Released: Early 1990s (original); Late 2019 (rerelease)
- Discontinued: Circa 2014-2016 (original)
- Media: ROM cartridge (Nintendo Famicom 60-pin standard)
- CPU: 1.66-1.79 MHz emulating 8-bit MOS 6502 @ 5.37 MHz
- Display: PAL, NTSC, NTSC 4.43, PAL-60: 256 x 240, 25 colors (out of 64)
- Sound: noise channel, PCM channel, 3 sound channels

Terminator 2 (Chinese: 终结者二; pinyin: Zhōngjié zhě èr, named after James Cameron's sci-fi movie of the same name) or Super Design Ending-Man BS-500 AS is a video game console sold throughout countries of the former Eastern Bloc, (Note: Russia and Ukraine (as Jippy), Albania, Armenia, the Baltic states, Bosnia and Herzegovina, Bulgaria, Croatia, Czech Republic, Georgia, Montenegro, North Macedonia, Poland, Romania, Serbia, Hungary, Slovakia) Italy (as Top Console), Greece, Spain, Finland (as Ending Man S-700), Iran, Iraq, Algeria, Malaysia, South Korea (as K-007 and Batman/Family Computer II), Kenya, India and Pakistan. Other variations include Ending man JJ-80-50, TERMINATOR 7. It is a hardware clone of the Nintendo Famicom.

== Background ==
This particular Famiclone was hugely popular in Poland, Serbia, North Macedonia, Montenegro, Croatia, Bulgaria, Hungary, Romania, Pakistan, India, Kenya, Iran and Bosnia, throughout the late 1990s and early 2000s. The system has gained cult status, and was widely available on flea markets and even in some electronic stores.

Due to political and economical restraints, the fourth and the fifth generation consoles such as the Sega Mega Drive, SNES, or PlayStation were not immediately available, and after their release, some of them were expensive for the average individual. The third generation remained highly popular because of their high availability and low prices, particularly the Terminator 2, which was one of the most successful Famicom clones. It left a mark in pop culture and 1990s-2000s youth, establishing itself as antonomasia for 8-bit video gaming, to the point of being more popular than the original NES in these regions.

The Terminator 2, like most known Famicom clones, was compatible with 60-pin Famicom cartridges (as well as 72-pin NES cartridges, which could be played via an adapter). Original Nintendo games were not popular due to their high prices and poor availability (except for the Game Boy, which was also pirated in these regions after its release). The majority of the games sold with and for the system were cheap unlicensed copies, manufactured mostly in Russia and China. Games for the Terminator 2 were still widely available in Central and Eastern Europe throughout the 2000s, mostly on street markets and in small toy stores.

Within the Donetsk region, Ukraine, Atlantida Enterprise LTD company sold a Dendy competitor, the Jippy game console, which was a clone of Ending Man. The console also used a mascot similar to Dendy - a similarly dressed hippopotamus named Jippy. It had headphone jacks and switches to activate the "turbo-pause". According to various estimates, 15,000 units were sold, including 5,000 in Moscow, Russia. A TV show Jippy Club was produced on the local Donetsk TV station. The project closed in 1994.

In South Korea, Kuk Je Academy sold this console as K-007 starting from 1991 and year later, Mega System released its version called Batman/Family Computer II.

=== Reintroduction ===
Years after the discontinuation of the Terminator 2 between 2014 and 2016, the console was rereleased in late 2019. It comes in a new box, deviating from the common Japanese Sega Mega Drive 2 design used in the original release, occasionally with a generic name like "Retro 8 bit TV console" or a more well-known name like "Terminator 2020". As of 2020, it can still be purchased from Chinese online retailers, retailing at about €20.

The reissued console contains several differences from the original version. Design-wise, the blue/white buttons were enlarged and shortened, the "Ending Man" logo was made smaller and "Terminator®" with 3 Chinese characters below it was added (in some variations the logo is non-existent), the cartridge removal lever is integrated into the console's casing as an aesthetic, nonfunctional design, and the placement of the power LED is moved to the center of the console. Other minor differences include the cover having a (sometimes black or blue) hinge while the original model had a black slider, the number of vent holes in the back decreased from 20 to 12, and the text in the circle around the top of the console was either changed or removed.

Hardware-wise, the console now uses a USB-to-MicroUSB cable with a USB power adaptor for power instead of an AC adapter with a DC plug, features two RCA connectors (yellow and white) instead of three (red, yellow and white), coinciding with the removal of a built-in RF modulator from the original, and the controllers used 9-pin connections similar to that of the Atari 2600 and the Sega Mega Drive rather than the 15-pin connections of the original Famicom, which were previously used in the original Terminator 2. Besides these changes, it remains compatible with standard 60-pin Famicom cartridges (and 72-pin NES cartridges via an adapter), and continues to use an NES-on-a-chip ASIC as with the original model.

The controllers for the reissued console are designed to be more ergonomic than the originals; the basic feature set of the controller from the original console was retained but had the "Ending Man" logo printed on it, and also featured the same 9-pin connections matching the ones found on the console itself.

== Design ==
The Terminator 2 borrows several design elements from the Sega Mega Drive, which was done to purposefully confuse buyers. The unit itself is colored black, and shares a similar size and shape with the revised version of the Mega Drive in 1993 (known as the Sega Mega Drive 2 in Japan) while also featuring a distinctive CD-ROM inspired circle around the cartridge slot as found on the original 1988 version as well as blue reset and power buttons inspired by the reset button of the original model, which was white on some consoles. Some sets also featured controllers that resembled the six button controllers that were offered for the Mega Drive. The console's box art most commonly features a design inspired by the box art of the Japanese Sega Mega Drive 2, with colorful triangles and similar logo designs.

=== Console ===
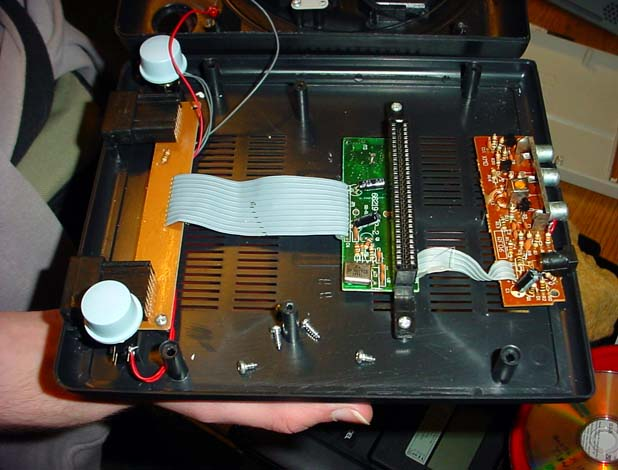
Inside of the Terminator 2

The typical retail set included the system, two detachable controllers (both with "turbo" buttons, which meant 4 buttons in total), a light gun, which also based on the original Nintendo gun accessory except for the design, a power supply and an RF cable. The console had a built-in RF modulator, as well as mono audio and composite video through RCA connectors. The system itself was powered by an NES-on-a-chip ASIC, otherwise known as an NOAC. Like many Famiclones of the era, the NOACs often exhibit various issues, such as the swapped duty cycle bug where the 50% pulse wave and 25% pulse wave are swapped and have problems with 4 screen mirroring. It primarily outputs video in PAL format, however other video formats such as NTSC can be achieved with some slight modifications. The system uses a 60-pin cartridge connector for games and is compatible with most Famicom games (and 72-pin NES cartridges via an adapter). A cartridge removal lever was included like with the original Famicom. The system could include built-in games, however the most common versions were bundled with multi-game cartridges such as "1000000 in 1" or "9999999 in 1", supposedly featuring a million games, only a small number of which actually being separate games and the rest just being renamed versions of the latter. Usually these were popular games such as Super Mario Bros. or Duck Hunt. Occasionally they were renamed, possibly in an attempt to avoid lawsuits.

== Pricing ==
The Terminator 2 consoles were mass-marketed by most of the major and smaller electronic stores. It is difficult to determine an exact price for the system, but in places like Gabrovo, Bulgaria in the mid 90s, one could buy it for the rough equivalent of €10. In Romania in 2015 it cost about €10, and in mid-90s roughly the equivalent of $7–10. In Sarajevo, Bosnia and Herzegovina after the Bosnian war it would cost the equivalent of €15. In Poland it used to cost equivalent of €9 to €15 and the games €1 to €2. In Georgia, in early 2000s it used to cost the equivalent of €6 to €15.

From 1998 until 2000, the Terminator 2 console used to cost €15 to €25 in Serbia. A normal price for a copied cartridge was €0.5, part of which were unauthorized "1,000,000 in 1" cartridges, containing several repeating games. In the early 2000s, the Terminator lost popularity in Serbia because of increased availability of new consoles. In 2013, the price of the console was €11 and it was still sold in Chinese shopping malls throughout Serbia.
