= Animal Genius =

2007 video game

- Developers: Big Blue Bubble (DS), Artech Digital Entertainment (PC)
- Publishers: Scholastic, Ubisoft (DS only)
- Platforms: Nintendo DS; Windows macOS; Leapster
- Release: NA: September 25, 2007; EU: July 18, 2008; AU: August 1, 2008
- Genre: Puzzle game
- Mode: Single-player

Animal Genius is a puzzle video game released for Windows in 2003, the Leapster in 2006, and Nintendo DS in 2007. Jack DeVries, writing for IGN, gave the game a score of 6.5/10, concluding that it is a decent title for young children with an interest in animals.

== Gameplay ==
Animal Genius consists of mini-games that test animal smarts, quick thinking and instincts on the quest to win 25 animals that live in five different habitats around the world—rainforest, Arctic, grasslands, ocean, and woodlands. After choosing a habitat, the player can earn up to five animals for that habitat by playing the mini-games. Each animal is worth a different point value. During the game, there is an "Animal Alert" where one of the unlocked animals can wander off into the wrong environment.

To earn the points needed for that animal, the player must choose any combination of the Scratch and See, Matchomatic, Creature Collector (or Feature Finder in the Leapster), or Maze Munch games. Once the player earns enough points needed for an animal, they must then answer ten questions about the animal in Animal Expert.

After successfully answering the questions, the player wins the animal for the habitat. To win the first animal in each habitat, it requires 25 points or 10 points (in the Leapster). To win the second animal, 50 points or 20 points are required. For the third animal, 75 or 30 points are required. For the fourth animal, 100 or 40 points are required. For the fifth and final animal in each habitat, 200 or 50 points are required.
