= LeapTV =

Educational video game console

- Developer: LeapFrog Enterprises
- Type: Home video game console
- Released: October 20, 2014
- Introductory price: US$149.99
- Media: ROM cartridge, digital download
- Storage: 16GB
- Display: HDMI 720p
- Camera: 640 x 480 motion sensing camera
- Predecessor: Zippity Learning System

The LeapTV is an educational video game console developed by LeapFrog and released on October 20, 2014. The console consists of the main unit, a motion sensing camera, and a modifiable controller for different play styles. The controller wirelessly connects to the console using Bluetooth and runs on AA batteries. The camera has a 640x480 pixel resolution and a motion detector. It comes with 16GB storage and 1GB of DDR3 memory.

== Games ==
- Kart Racing Supercharged!
- Disney Sofia the First
- Ultimate Spider-Man
- LeapFrog Letter Factory Adventures
- Blaze and the Monster Machines
- PAW Patrol: Storm Rescuers
- Pixar Pals Plus
- Nickelodeon Dora and Friends
- Dance and Learn
- DoodleCraft
- Sports!
- Disney Frozen
- Bubble Guppies
- Jake and the Never Land Pirates
- Disney Princess
- Pet Play World
- Banzai Beans: Ninja Number Challenge
- Leapfrog Classics: Splurgle, LeapSchool Cooking, Aardvark Adventure Tales
- Solar Taxi
- Molecule Mission
