= LeapFrog Tag =

Electronic stylus for LeapFrog products

LeapFrog Tag is an electronic handheld stylus that stores audio for proprietary paper books made by LeapFrog Enterprises. When in use the stylus is scanned across the page of a book, activating the stylus to play the prerecorded audio stored inside the stylus. When a word is scanned, for example, the stylus "reads" the word aloud to the user. The user can also play various games through this technique. LeapFrog Enterprises introduced it as the successor to the LeapPad which served as a platform for interactive books. The Tag stylus and the proprietary Tag books are primarily targeted to young children learning to read.

The Tag reader offers an alternative to either audiobooks or a supervisory person reading aloud, chiefly for before children are able to read on a particular level. It can teach phonics and help children develop a sense of independent reading, which, in turn, helps them become better readers.

LeapFrog has developed a number of titles and book sets that target specific phonic skills. These sets can be used as a supplement to support a reading or literacy curriculum currently implemented in the classroom. LeapFrog's Tag reader is accessible to a wide variety of students' learning abilities. Because Tag readers are designed with both full reading and individual word recognition this allows for differentiation. Tag also helps students learning English as a second language.

== Technology ==
The indefinite article "a" in a Tag book is uniquely identified by the pattern of dots all around.

Tag requires a Microsoft Windows or Mac OS computer running LeapFrog Connect software to populate the Tag with audio for books. The software downloads book audio from the LeapFrog web site and transmits it to Tag via a USB cable.

The Tag pen device works with specially made books which include an optical pattern of dots too small to disturb the reader. A stylus touches the book to actuate the Tag device, and the device, through analysis of the printed pattern, divines both the book being read and its exact position within the book. With the book and position known, the Tag device looks up the appropriate audio to play for that location in the book and plays it. This technique for position recognition is patented by Anoto.

Tag includes a state machine to facilitate game play on specially designed pages of books, with games like, "Find the letter that makes the sound k." It also collects statistics on usage to reconnect with the software and present electronic rewards to the learner and help parents monitor learning progress.

Tag and the proprietary, compatible books were covered by U.S. Patents 6502756, 6548768, 6666376, 6667695, 6674427, 6732927, 6836555, 7224348, and 7281664; however the majority of these patents have now expired.
