= LeapFrog Didj =

Handheld video game console for children

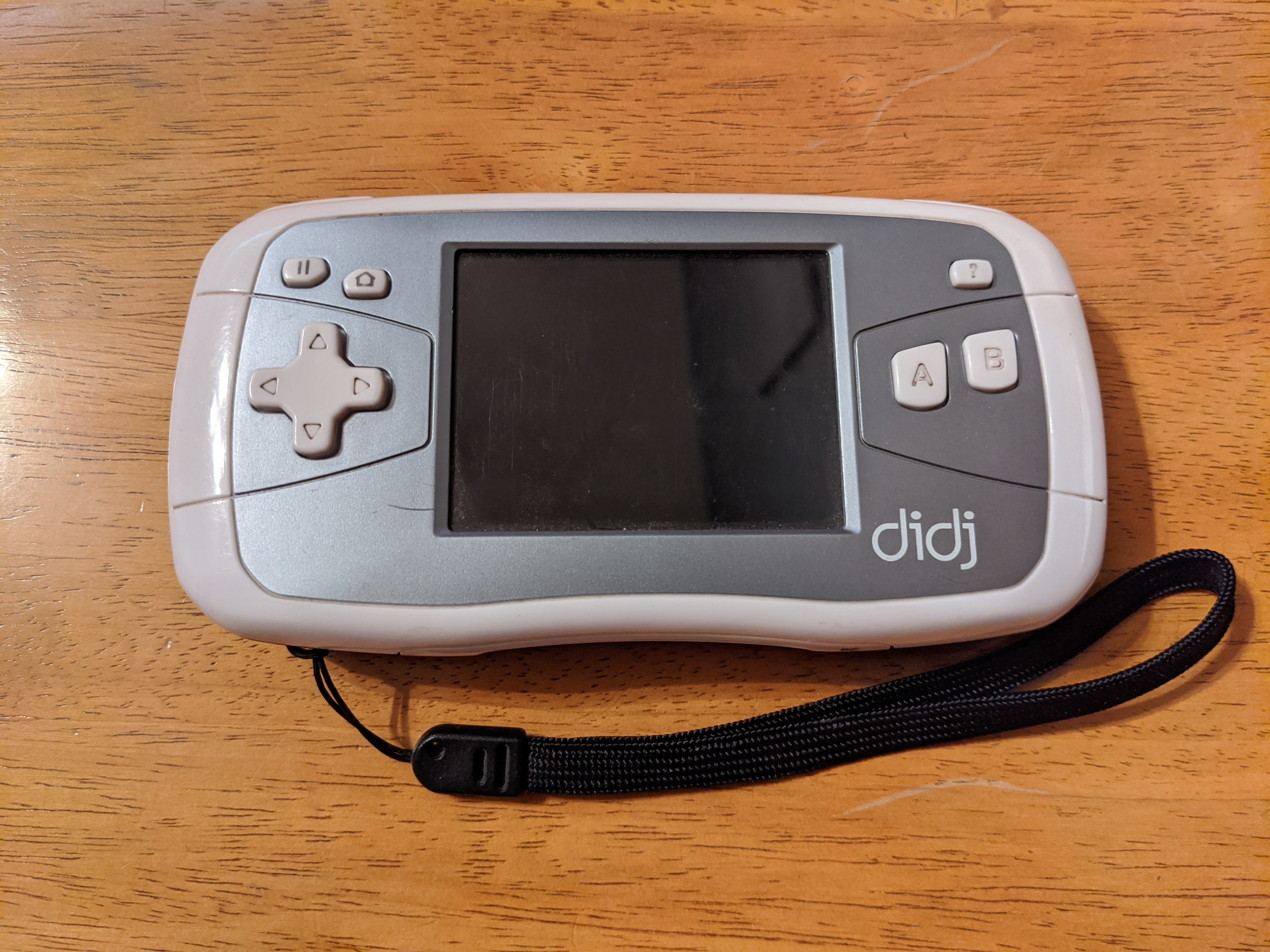
- Manufacturer: LeapFrog Enterprises
- Type: Handheld game console
- Released: August 22, 2008; 18 years ago
- Introductory price: $89.99
- Media: Cartridge, download
- CPU: LeapFrog LF-1000 (Pollux SoC) ARM9 @ 393 MHz
- Memory: 32MB
- Storage: 256MB
- Marketing target: Children aged 6-10
- Predecessor: Leapster
- Successor: Leapster Explorer

The LeapFrog Didj is a handheld console made by LeapFrog Enterprises. The Didj was priced at $89.99 when it debuted on August 22, 2008. Its library mostly consists of educational software aimed for children based on licensed properties such as those from Disney, Nickelodeon, and Marvel.

The Didj runs on a customized Linux distribution with OpenGL, plus homebrew applications and demos.

== Games ==
- Didji Racing: Tiki Tropics
- Foster's Home for Imaginary Friends
- Hannah Montana
- High School Musical
- Indiana Jones and the Kingdom of the Crystal Skull
- Jetpack Heroes
- Nancy Drew: Mystery in the Hollywood Hills
- Neopets: Quizara's Curse
- Nicktoons: Android Invasion
- Sonic the Hedgehog
- SpongeBob SquarePants: Fists of Foam
- Star Wars: Jedi Trials
- Star Wars: The Clone Wars
- Super Chicks
- Tinker Bell and the Lost Treasure
- Wolverine and the X-Men
