= Leapster =

Educational hand-held game console

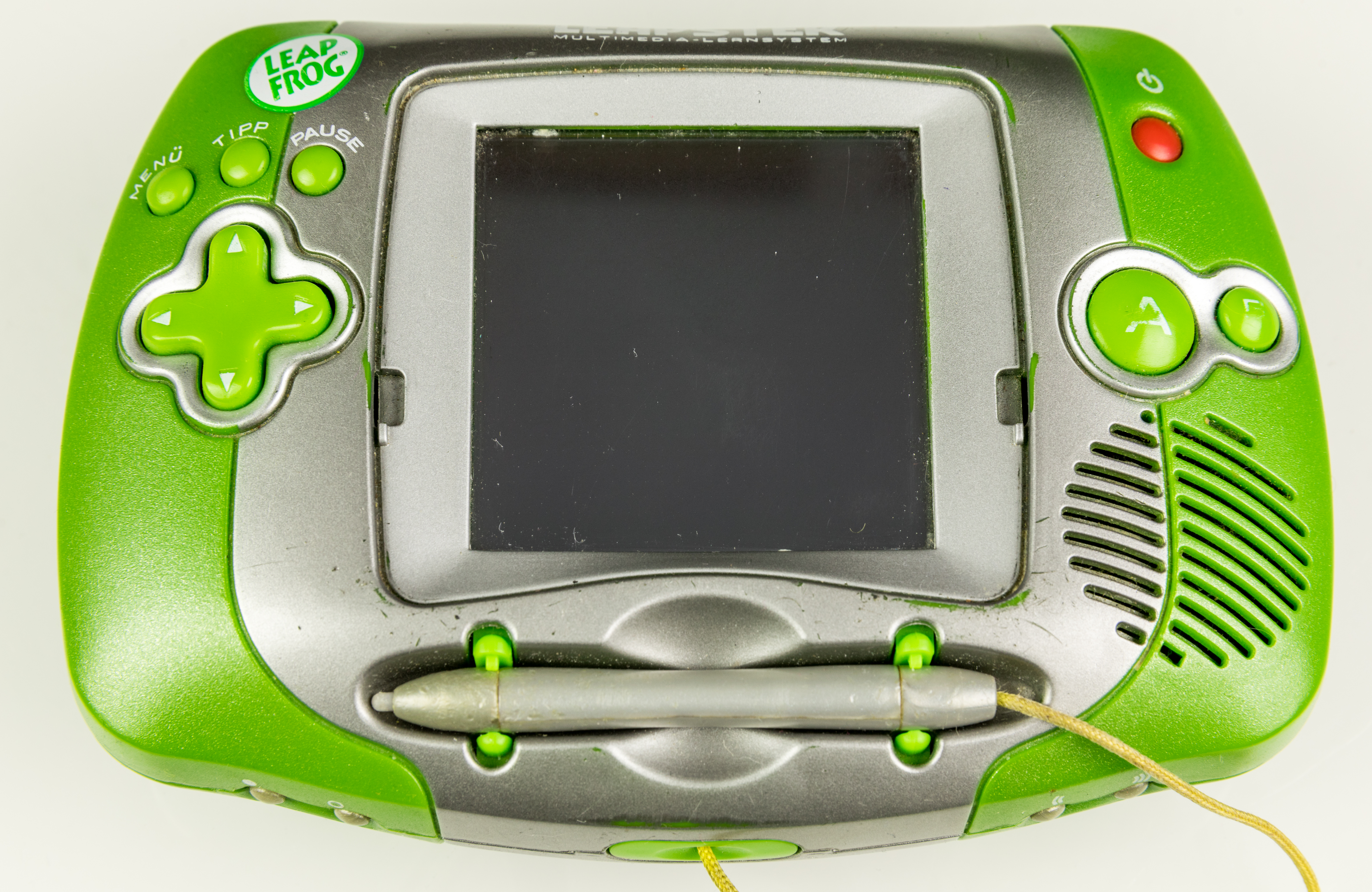
- A German-language green Leapster
- Manufacturer: LeapFrog Enterprises
- Product family: Leapster series
- Type: Handheld game console
- Generation: Sixth
- Released: October 7, 2003; 23 years ago
- Discontinued: 2011; 15 years ago (cartridges); 2014; 12 years ago (final discontinuation)
- Units sold: 4 million
- Media: Leapster cartridges
- Operating system: MQX, Macromedia Flash MX 2004
- CPU: ARCTangent CPU @ 96MHz
- Memory: (2MB RAM, 256 bytes NVRAM)
- Display: 160x160 CSTN touchscreen
- Sound: Sequenced audio, CELP voice compression at 8000 Hz
- Best-selling game: SpongeBob SquarePants Saves the Day!
- Successor: Leapster2; LeapFrog Didj

Leapster2
- Manufacturer: LeapFrog Enterprises
- Product family: Leapster series
- Type: Handheld game console
- Generation: Seventh generation
- Released: July 1, 2008; 18 years ago
- Lifespan: NA/EU: 2008
- Discontinued: 2019; 7 years ago
- Media: Leapster cartridges
- CPU: ARCTangent A5 (Overclocked)
- Best-selling game: Learning Path games
- Predecessor: Leapster
- Successor: Leapster Explorer

The Leapster Learning Game System, formerly known as the Leapster Multimedia Learning System, is an educational handheld game console manufactured and sold by LeapFrog Enterprises, aimed at children ages 4 to 10 (preschool to fifth grade). Its games teach the alphabet, phonics, basic math (addition, subtraction, multiplication, division), and art and animal facts to players. Along with a directional pad, the system features a touchscreen with a stylus pen that enables young users to interact directly with the screen.

The Leapster was released in October 2003. LeapFrog released the Leapster2 handheld device as a successor to the Leapster in July 2008, adding a USB port and SD card slot. These additions allow the user to play a downloaded game and allows games to log user data, such as topics learned or user-created art. Logged activity is sent to LeapFrog's "Learning Path" system, which tracks educational milestones completed. Completion of certain learning activities allows online games to be accessed. Art created using the Leapster can be further modified online and printed using a computer. The Leapster and Leapster L-MAX were retired in 2014, and the Leapster2 was retired in 2019.

== History ==
Originally released on October 7, 2003, the Leapster was revised and remade several times. The Leapster L-MAX, a version that has one extra feature (an A/V TV output, which allows the user to view and hear gameplay on their television) was released in 2004. The L-MAX console's size has decreased and the pen is now a wire instead of a thread. The Leapster TV, a screenless version with the same basic control layout in a console form, was released in 2005 and retired in 2007.

The Leapster was the best-selling educational handheld game console in America, selling about 4 million units and 12 million software cartridges since its inception as of May 2007. It was sold in nine countries directly and in another 7 for teaching English as a second language in schools.

== Software ==
There are approximately 40 games available for the Leapster, with over 50 created.

All games for the Leapster feature a "Hint" function along with a dedicated "Hint" button that will bring up audio or animated information on instructions given in the game.

LeapFrog has not opened the Leapster platform to significant amounts of third-party or homebrew development; software is typically developed in-house or as work-for-hire.

== Reception ==
Dave Bauer stated that there is a "depressingly small library of software available for the Leapster ... but some more varied software would make it much more interesting for [my son] ... no platform that has ever been successful without third-party software. ... Besides that, a strong hobbyist platform would be amazing".

Ian Bogost stated "the potential for improved educational game design is simply not going to come from inside the LeapFrog corporation".

== Licensed games ==
- 1st Grade
- 2nd Grade: Musical Menace
- Adibou: À la Recherche de Robilloc
- Animal Genius
- The Backyardigans
- The Batman: Multiply, Divide and Conquer
- The Batman: Strength in Numbers
- Bratz World: The Jet Set
- Cars
- Cars 2
- Cars Supercharged
- Clifford the Big Red Dog: Reading
- Cosmic Math
- Crayola: Art Adventure
- Creature Create
- Digging for Dinosaurs
- The Disney•PIXAR Collection
- Disney Fairies
- Disney Princess: Enchanted Learning
- Disney Princess: Worlds of Enchantment
- Dora the Explorer: Camping Adventure
- Dora the Explorer: Piñata Party
- Dora the Explorer: Wildlife Rescue
- Finding Nemo
- Foster's Home for Imaginary Friends
- Get Puzzled!
- Go, Diego, Go!: Animal Rescuer
- I Spy: Challenger!
- I Spy: Treasure Hunt
- The Incredibles
- Kindergarten
- Learning with Leap (cartridge-only game, built in on some Leapsters)
- Letter Factory
- Letters on the Loose
- Letterpillar
- Madagascar
- Math Baseball
- Math Missions
- Mr. Pencil's Learn to Draw and Write
- My Amusement Park
- NASCAR
- Ni Hao, Kai-Lan: Beach Day
- Noddy: Rainbow Adventures (UK only)
- Number Raiders
- Numbers on the Run: Counting on Zero
- Outwit!
- The Penguins of Madagascar: Race for 1st Place!
- Pet Pals
- Phonics: Lesson One
- The Princess and the Frog
- Ratatouille
- Reading with Phonics: Mole's Huge Nose
- Rock the World: A Reading Adventure
- Schoolhouse Rock!: America Rock
- Schoolhouse Rock!: Grammar Rock
- Scooby-Doo!: Math Times Two
- Scooby-Doo!: Spooky Snacks
- Sonic X
- Spider-Man: The Case of the Sinister Speller
- SpongeBob SquarePants: Saves the Day
- SpongeBob SquarePants: Through the Wormhole
- Star Wars: The Clone Wars - Jedi Math
- Star Wars: Jedi Reading
- Tangled
- The Talking Words Factory
- Thomas & Friends: Calling All Engines!
- Top-Secret Personal Beeswax: Share a Journal with Junie B.
- Toy Story 3
- Up
- WALL-E
- Wolverine and the X-Men
- Word Chasers

== Technical specifications ==
=== Hardware ===
- CPU: Custom ASIC containing an ARCTangent-A5 CPU, running at 96 MHz.
- Memory: Original Leapster: 2 MB onboard RAM, 256 bytes non-volatile. Leapster2: 16 MB RAM, 128 KB non-volatile storage
- Media type: Cartridges of 4-16 MB with between 2 and 512 KB non-volatile storage.
- Audio: Proprietary hardware audio acceleration, which includes sequenced audio playback and CELP voice compression sampled at 8000 Hz.
  - It retains the same sound source from the original LeapPad from 1999.
- Screen: 160x160 CSTN with touchscreen.
- Leapster2 only: USB 1.1 (client only) and full-sized SD slot.
- Some Leapster2s have no SD slot and use onboard memory in place of it.

Most of the software content for the original Leapster was created with Macromedia Flash MX 2004; the device runs a version of Adobe Flash Player that was licensed to LeapFrog and ported to the Leapster. Tom Prichard, Sr. Vice President of Marketing for Leapfrog, said that he believed using Flash allowed them to "bring the Leapster system to life more rapidly than we could have with any other development method".
