= ROM cartridge =

Replaceable device used for the distribution and storage of video games

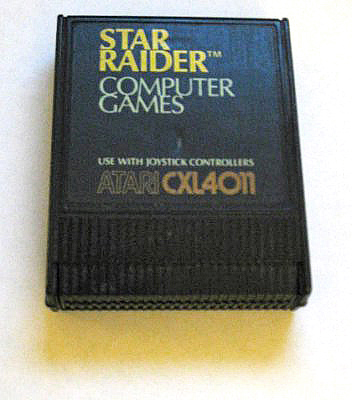
A Star Raiders ROM cartridge for an Atari computer

A ROM cartridge, usually referred to in context simply as a cartridge, cart, cassette, or card, is a replaceable part designed to be connected to a consumer electronics device such as a home computer, video game console or, to a lesser extent, electronic musical instruments.

ROM cartridges allow users to rapidly load and access programs and data alongside a floppy drive in a home computer; in a video game console, the cartridges are standalone. At the time around their release, ROM cartridges provided security against unauthorised copying of software. However, the manufacturing of ROM cartridges was more expensive than floppy disks, and the storage capacity was smaller. ROM cartridges and slots were also used for various hardware accessories and enhancements.

The widespread usage of the ROM cartridge in video gaming applications has led it to be often colloquially called a game cartridge.

== History ==
ROM cartridges were popularized by early home computers which featured a special bus port for the insertion of cartridges containing software in ROM. In most cases, the designs were fairly crude, with the entire address and data buses exposed by the port and attached via an edge connector; the cartridge was memory mapped directly into the system's address space such that the CPU could execute the program in place without having to first copy it into expensive RAM.

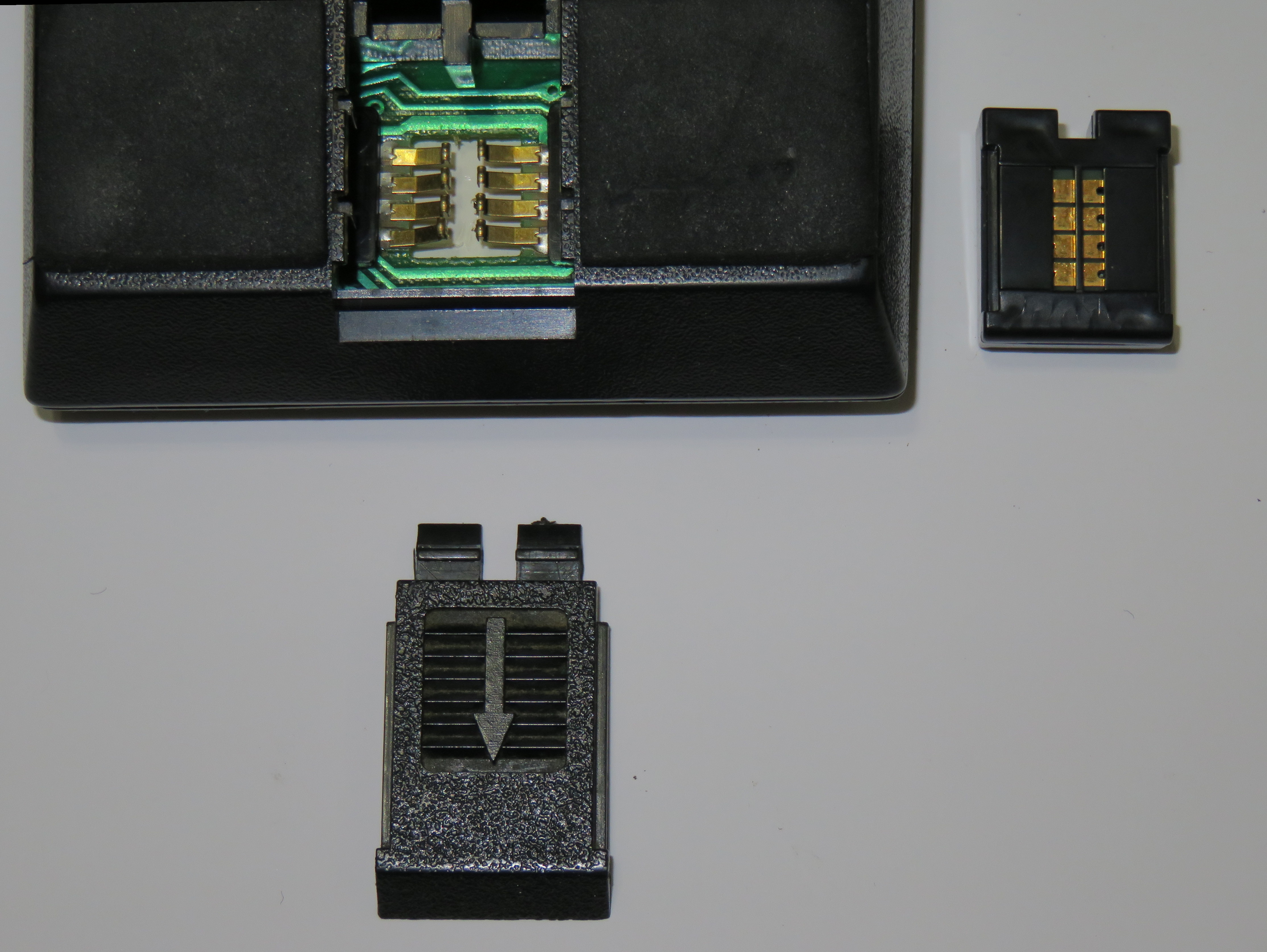
TI-59 programmable calculator with ROM software library module at right, showing gold-plated contacts. Via the modules, software for a broad spectrum of applications could be bought, even for navigational calculations at sea.

The Texas Instruments TI-59 family of programmable scientific calculators used interchangeable ROM cartridges that could be installed into a slot at the back of the calculator. The calculator came with a module that provides several standard mathematical functions including the solution of simultaneous equations. Other modules were specialized for financial calculations, or other subject areas, and even a "games" module. Modules for these devices are not user-programmable. The Hewlett-Packard HP-41C also had expansion slots which could hold ROM memory as well as I/O expansion ports; modules for these devices are more versatile than those of the TI-59 calculators.

Computers using cartridges in addition to magnetic media are the VIC-20 and Commodore 64, MSX, Atari 8-bit computers, TI-99/4A (where they were called Solid State Command Modules and were not directly mapped to the system bus) and IBM PCjr (where the cartridge was mapped into BIOS space). Some arcade system boards, such as SNK's Neo Geo, also used ROM cartridges. Cassettes and floppy disks cost less than ROM cartridges and some memory cards were sold as an inexpensive alternative to ROM cartridges.

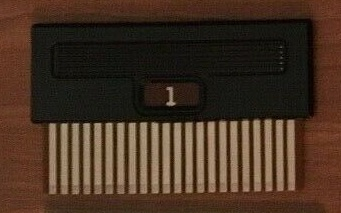
First cartridge-like jumper card for the Magnavox Odyssey

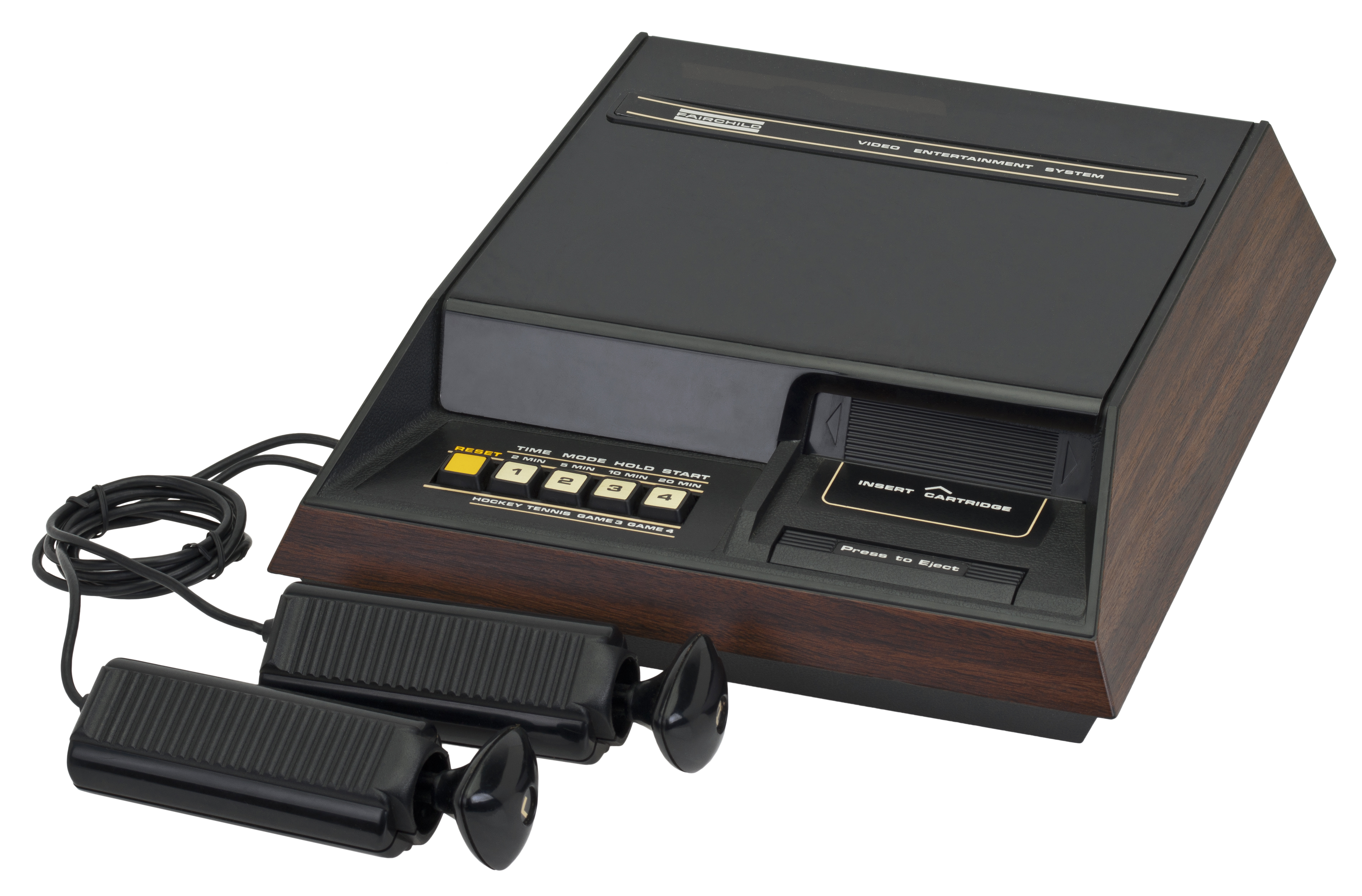
The Fairchild Channel F was the first video game console to feature games on interchangeable ROM cartridges.

A precursor to modern game cartridges of second generation video consoles was introduced with the first generation video game console Magnavox Odyssey in 1972, using jumper cards to turn on and off certain electronics inside the console. A modern take on game cartridges was invented by Wallace Kirschner and Lawrence Haskel of Alpex Computer Corporation as well as Jerry Lawson at Fairchild Semiconductor, for use with the Fairchild Channel F home console in 1976. This cartridge approach became popular with the release of the Atari 2600 the following year. From the late 1970s to mid-1990s, the majority of home video game systems were cartridge-based.

As compact disc technology became widely used for data storage, most hardware companies moved from cartridges to CD-based game systems. Nintendo remained the lone holdout, using cartridges for their Nintendo 64 system; the company did not transition to optical media until the release of the GameCube in 2001. Cartridges were also used for their handheld consoles, which are known as Game Paks in the Game Boy family of handhelds and as Game Cards in the DS/3DS line of handhelds. These cartridges are much smaller and thinner than previous cartridges. In the case of Game Cards, flash memory is used to store the game data in lieu of dedicated ROM chips used in most previous game cartridges. Sony's PlayStation Vita handheld also used a similar cartridge design known as the PlayStation Vita Game Card, which uses flash memory technology much like Nintendo's Game Cards.

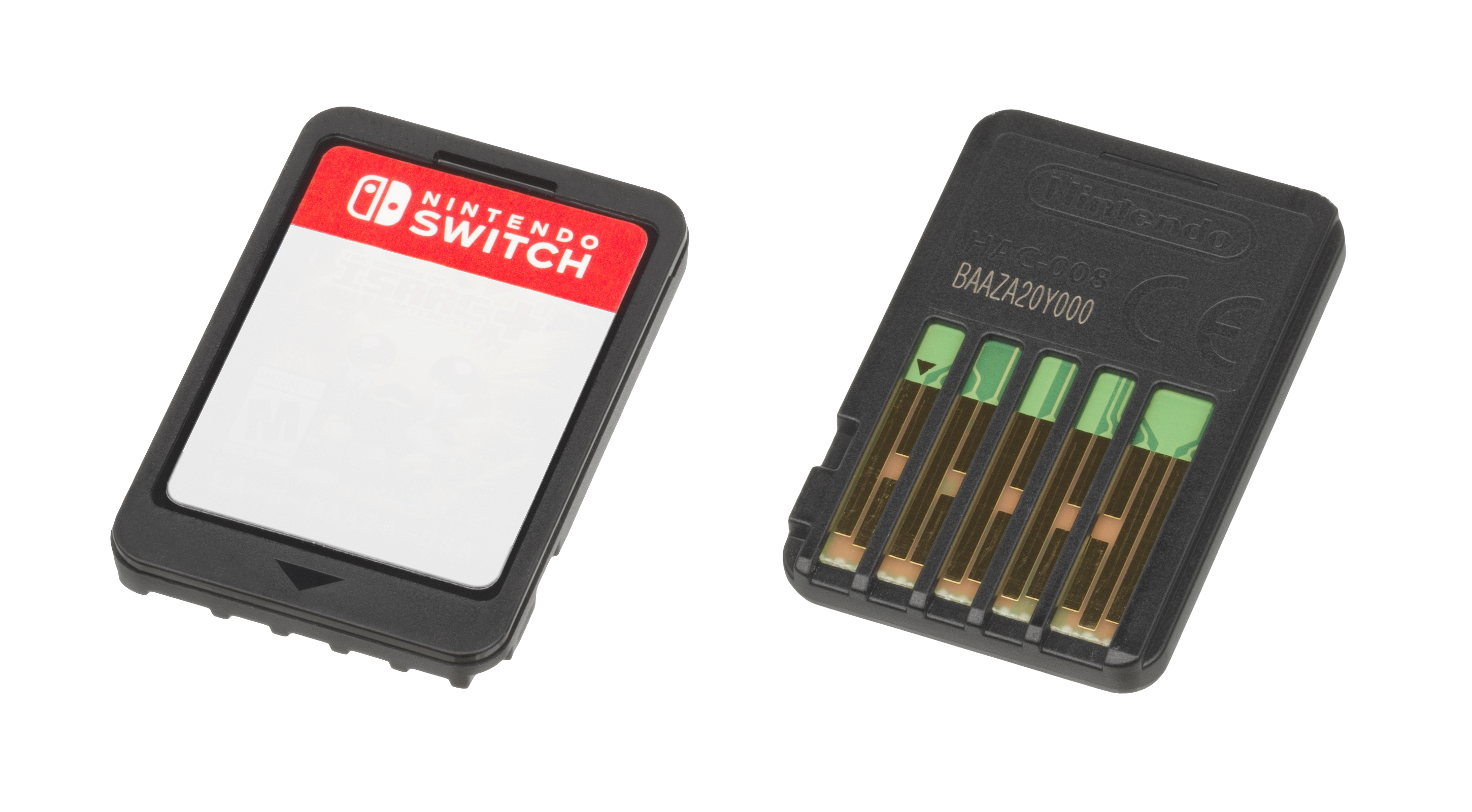
Nintendo Switch game cards. Reverse side of The Binding of Isaac: Afterbirth+ shown on right.

In recent years, Nintendo has moved away from utilizing its own proprietary optical disc-based media after producing the last few first-party games for the Wii U in 2017 with the launch of the Nintendo Switch that year, which featured small cartridges instead of optical discs. These cartridges are known as Game Cards, similar to previous Nintendo handhelds since the DS, and are much smaller and thinner than previous cartridges for consoles as well as Nintendo's own Game Cards for their DS/3DS handhelds. They used a form of flash memory technology similar to that of SD cards with larger storage space. The final games made for Nintendo's optical disc media (specifically the Wii and Wii U) were released in 2020, three years after the release of the Nintendo Switch. Nintendo's approach of using cartridge-like Game Cards continued on with the release of the Nintendo Switch 2 in 2025. Today, Nintendo is the only major company to exclusively use cartridge-based media for its consoles and handhelds as others such as Sony and Microsoft continue to use optical disc-based media for their consoles.

In 1976, 310,000 home video game cartridges were sold in the United States. Between 1983 and 2013, a total of 2,910.72 million software cartridges had been sold for Nintendo consoles.

== Use in hardware enhancements ==
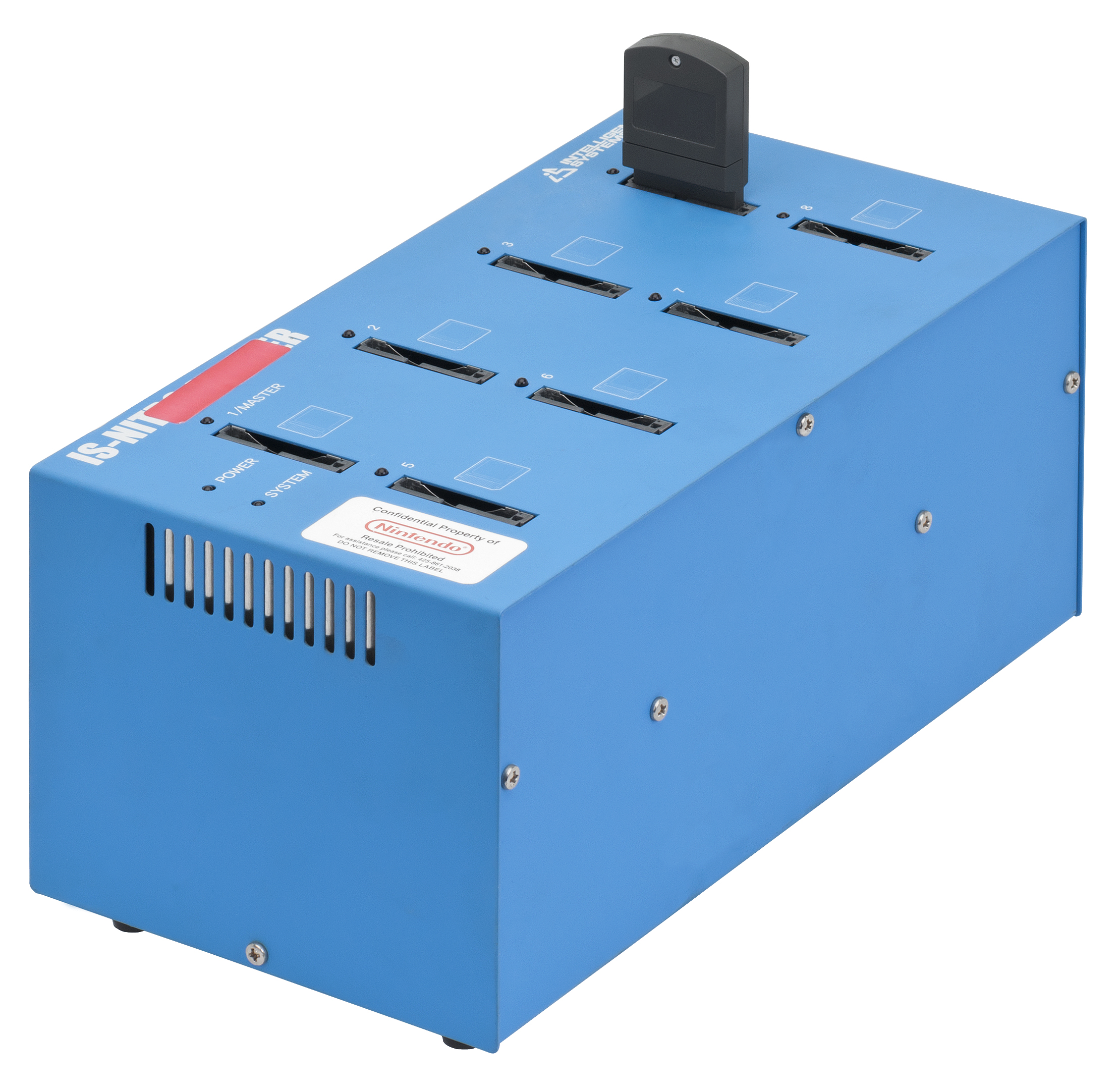
ROM burner for the Nintendo DS

ROM cartridges can not only carry software, but additional hardware expansions as well. Examples include various cartridge-based chips on the Super NES, the SVP chip in the Sega Genesis version of Virtua Racing, and a chess module in the Magnavox Odyssey².

Micro Machines 2 on the Genesis/Mega Drive used a custom "J-Cart" cartridge design by Codemasters which incorporated two additional gamepad ports. This allowed players to have up to four gamepads connected to the console without the need for an additional multi-controller adapter.

== Advantages and disadvantages ==
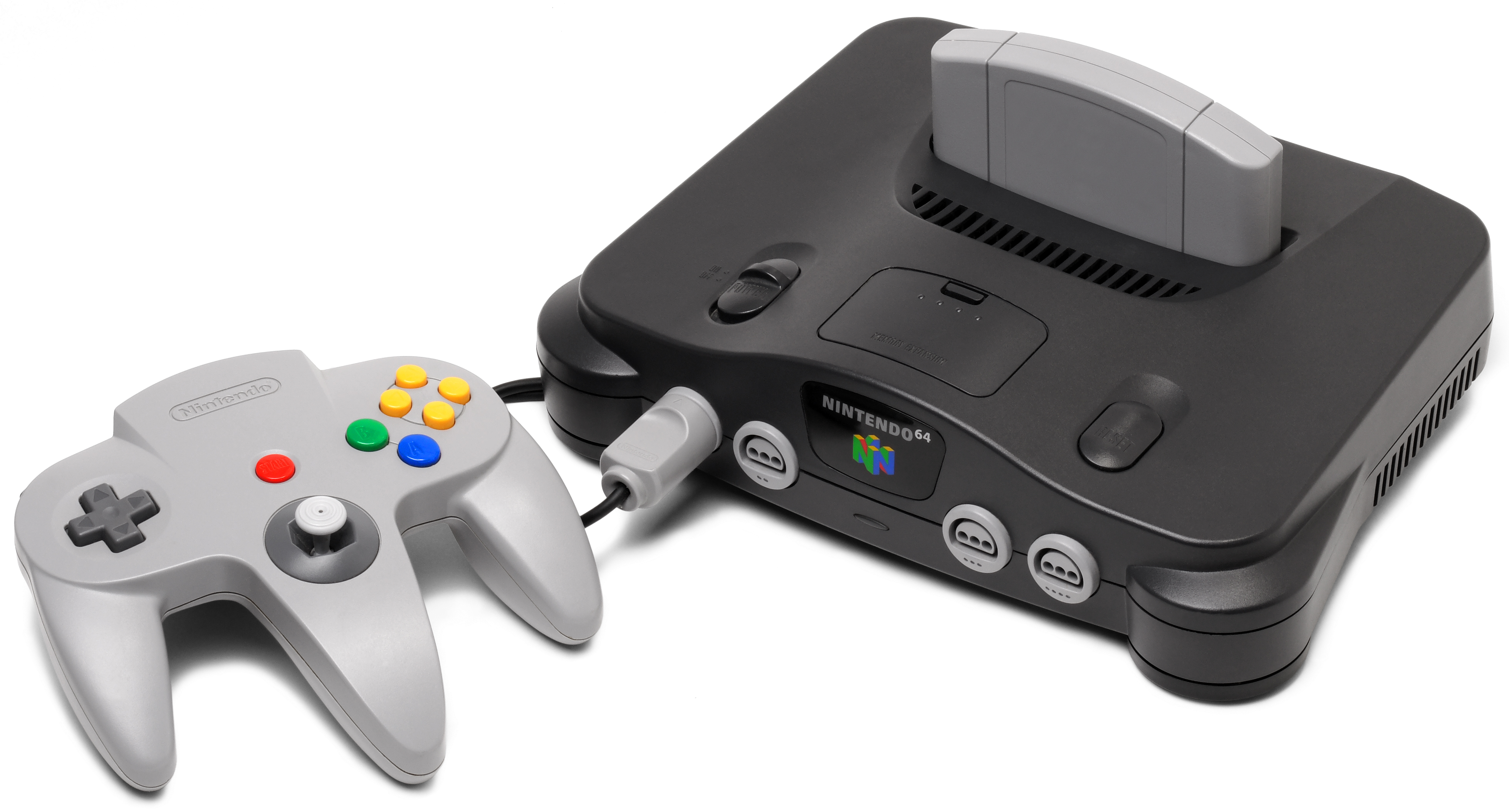
The N64 used cartridges when most home consoles had shifted to CD-ROMs.

Storing software on ROM cartridges has a number of advantages over other methods of storage like floppy disks and optical media. As the ROM cartridge is memory mapped into the system's normal address space, software stored in the ROM can be read like normal memory and since the system does not have to transfer data from slower media, it allows for nearly instant load time and code execution. Software run directly from ROM typically uses less RAM, leaving memory free for other processes. While the standard size of optical media dictates a minimum size for devices that can read discs, ROM cartridges can be manufactured in different sizes, allowing for smaller devices like handheld game systems. ROM cartridges can be damaged, but they are generally more robust and resistant to damage than optical media; accumulation of dirt and dust on the cartridge contacts can cause problems, but cleaning the contacts with an isopropyl alcohol solution typically resolves the problems without risk of corrosion.

ROM cartridges typically have less capacity than other media. The PCjr-compatible version of Lotus 1-2-3 comes on two cartridges and a floppy disk. ROM cartridges are typically more expensive to manufacture than discs, and storage space available on a cartridge is less than that of an optical disc like a DVD-ROM or CD-ROM. For example, the largest Nintendo 64 Game Pak can hold up to 64 MB of data, while the console's competitors, PlayStation and Sega Saturn, use CD-ROMs capable of storing 650–700 MB. Techniques such as bank switching were employed to be able to use cartridges with a capacity higher than the amount of memory directly addressable by the processor. As video games became more complex (and the size of their code grew), software manufacturers began sacrificing the quick load times of ROM cartridges in favor of greater storage capacity and the lower cost of optical media. Another source of pressure in this direction was that optical media could be manufactured in much smaller batches than cartridges; releasing a cartridge video game, on the other hand, inevitably includes the risk of producing thousands of unsold cartridges.

== Electronic musical instruments usage ==
Besides their prominent usage on video game consoles, ROM cartridges have also been used on a small number of electronic musical instruments, particularly electronic keyboards.

Casio has made several cartridges for its Casiotone line of portable electronic keyboards in the 1980s. These are known as ROM Packs.

Yamaha has made several models with such features with their DX synthesizer in the 1980s, shortly after Casio's ROM Pack cartridges came to market, such as the DX1, DX5 and DX7 and their PSR keyboard lineup in the mid-1990s, namely the PSR-320, PSR-420, PSR-520, PSR-620, PSR-330, PSR-530 and the PSR-6000. These keyboards use specialized cards known as Music Cartridges, a ROM cartridge simply containing MIDI data to be played on the keyboard as MIDI sequence or song data. The RX-5 also used cartridges to store custom and new sounds.

== Cartridge-based video game consoles and home computers ==
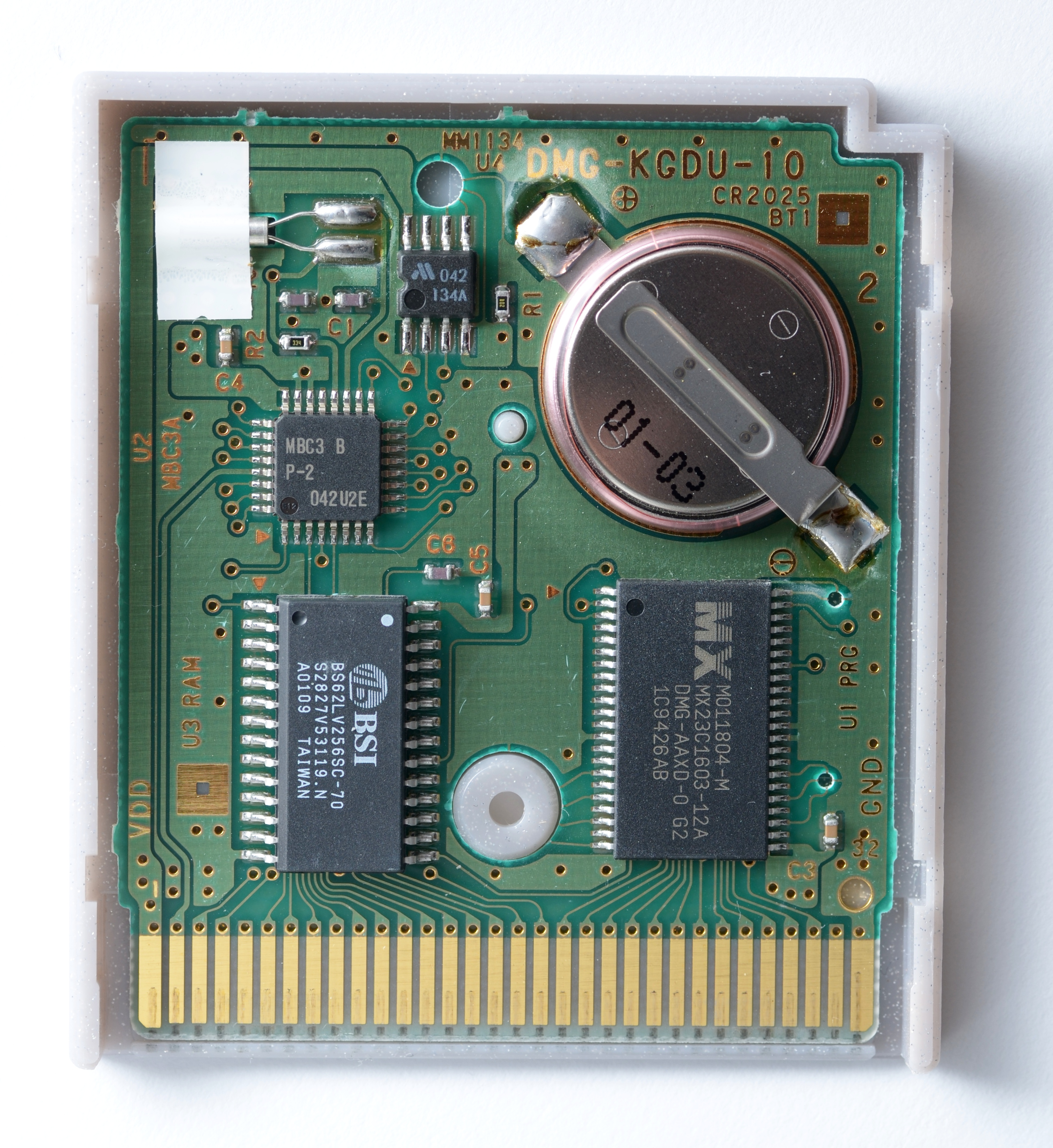
An opened Game Boy cartridge with battery-backed volatile memory for game saves for Pokémon Silver Version. Measures 2.2" × 2.56" × 0.32" (or 56 mm × 65 mm × 8 mm)

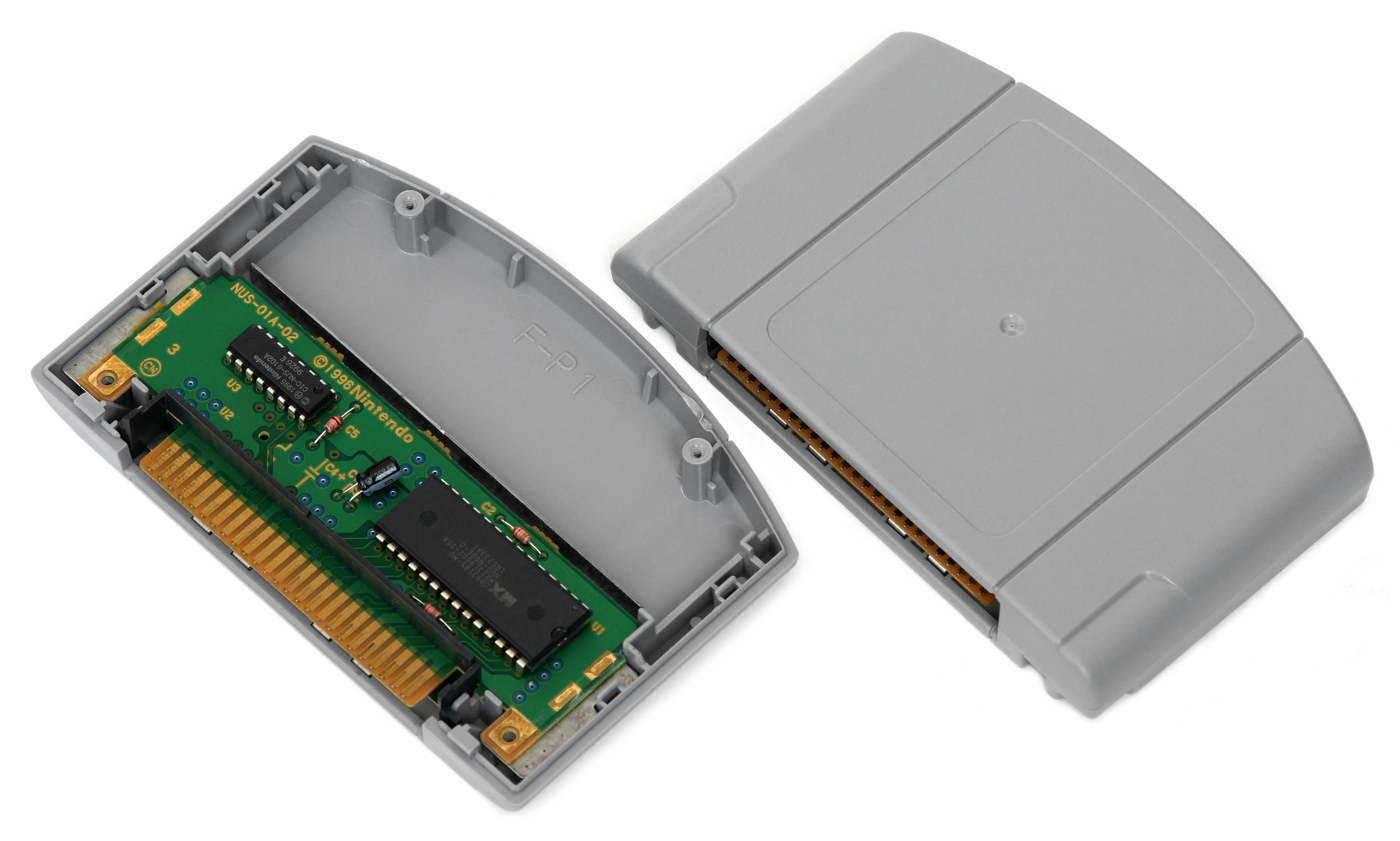
A disassembled Nintendo 64 Game Pak

Amstrad

- GX4000

Atari, Inc.

- Atari 2600
- Atari 5200
- Atari 7800
- Atari XEGS
- Lynx
- Jaguar

Bandai

- WonderSwan
- WonderSwan Color / SwanCrystal

Blaze Entertainment

- Evercade

Coleco

- Colecovision

Fairchild Camera and Instrument

- Channel F

Fisher-Price

- Pixter
- Smart Cycle

IBM

- IBM PCjr

Interton

- Interton Video 2000

LeapFrog

- Leapster
- LeapPad
- LeapTV

Magnavox / Philips

- Magnavox Odyssey
- Magnavox Odyssey 2 / Philips Videopac G7000

Mattel

- Intellivision

Milton Bradley

- Vectrex
- Microvision

NEC

- TurboGrafx-16/PC Engine
- TurboExpress

Nikko Europe

- digiBLAST

Nintendo

- NES/Famicom (with its clones like Terminator)
- SNES/Super Famicom
- Nintendo 64
- Game Boy
- Game Boy Color
- Game Boy Advance
- Virtual Boy
- Pokémon Mini

Sega

- SG-1000 Mark I / SG-1000 Mark II
- Master System / Mark III
- Genesis / Mega Drive
- Game Gear
- Pico
- 32X
- Genesis Nomad
- Advanced Pico Beena

SNK

- Neo Geo
- Neo Geo Pocket
- Neo Geo Pocket Color
- Neo Geo X

Takara

- E-kara

VTech

- V.Smile

== See also ==
- ROM image
- Dongle
- Port expander
- RAM pack
- Currah
- Expansion card
- Memory card
