= LeapFrog Enterprises =

American educational entertainment and electronics company

LeapFrog Enterprises, Inc.
- Logo used since 2008

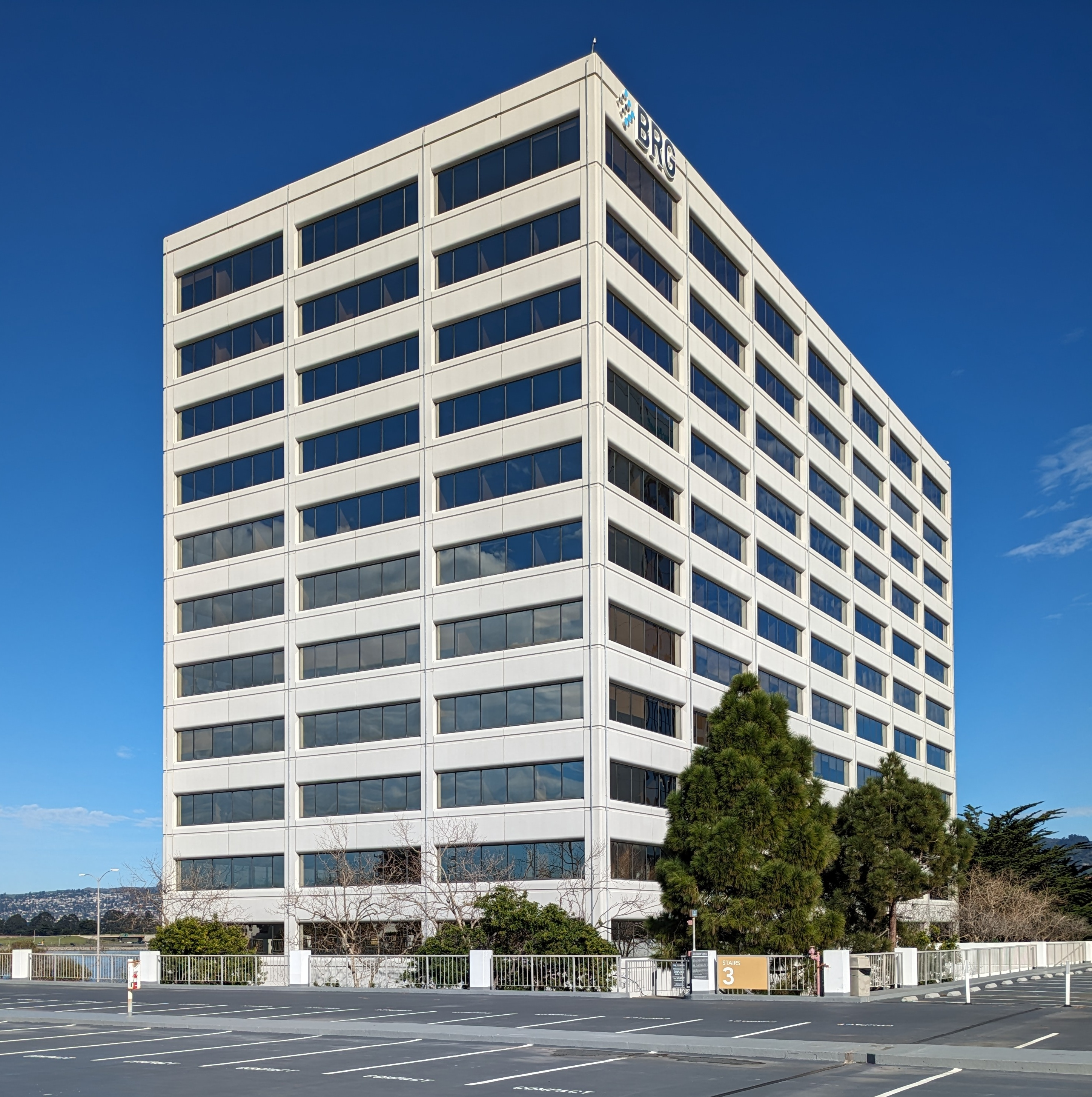
- Global headquarters in Emeryville, California
- Type: Subsidiary
- Traded as: NYSE: LF
- Industry: Educational toys; Interactive entertainment; Home video
- Founded: 1994; 32 years ago
- Founder: Michael Wood; Robert Lally
- Headquarters: Emeryville, California, U.S.
- Area served: Worldwide
- Key people: John Barbour (CEO); William "Bill" Chiasson (chairman); Raymond Arthur (CFO)
- Number of employees: 579 (2014)
- Parent: Knowledge Universe (1997-2016); VTech (2016–present)
- Website: leapfrog.com

LeapFrog Enterprises, Inc. is an educational entertainment and electronics company based in Emeryville, California. LeapFrog designs, develops, and markets technology-based learning products and related content for the education of children from infancy through grade school. The company was founded by Michael Wood and Robert Lally in 1994. John Barbour is the chief executive officer of LeapFrog.

== History ==
=== 1990–1997: Founding ===
The history of LeapFrog traces back to the late 1980s when LeapFrog founder Michael Wood, an attorney at Cooley LLP, had difficulties teaching his son how to read. He began researching phonics and marketing while continuing as a partner at Cooley. By 1994, Wood had developed the first prototype of what would become Phonics Desk, LeapFrog's first product. The prototype utilized a Texas Instruments chip that was previously used by one of Wood's clients to develop talking greeting cards. Wood solicited feedback on his prototype from the late Robert Calfee, an expert on children's reading development and a professor of education at the Stanford Graduate School of Education.

Wood began manufacturing the Phonics Desk in 1995. That year, Wood resigned as a partner at Cooley LLP and founded LeapFrog Enterprises with Robert Lally. The company received $800,000 in seed funding from friends, family, and former clients of Wood. Toys "R" Us became the first major retailer to carry the Phonics Desk shortly before Christmas 1995. Other retailers such as FAO Schwarz, Walmart and Target later began carrying the toy.

=== 1998–2002: Expansion and acquisition by Knowledge Universe ===
LeapFrog had distribution in over 10 countries and a number of major clients in the US by early 1997. In March of that year, the company hired Brad Crawford, who formerly worked for Little Tikes, to oversee sales and manufacturing. Knowledge Universe acquired a majority stake in LeapFrog in October 1997. Knowledge Universe is an education company founded by brothers Lowell Milken and Michael Milken, Larry Ellison, and Tom Kalinske. LeapFrog subsequently merged with Knowledge Universe's Knowledge Kids division. Kalinske, a former executive at Mattel, became LeapFrog chief executive officer as a result of the merger.

LeapFrog acquired Explore Technologies in August 1998. Explore Technologies produced the Odyssey Globe, an interactive globe that could call out the names of countries when users touched the globe with a specially designed stylus. Explore Technologies' stylus technology was later used in LeapFrog's LeapPad, a learning tablet that sounds out words when users drag a stylus across a word in LeapPad books. The LeapPad launched in 1999 and became Leapfrog's flagship product. It was the top-selling toy in the US for 2001 and 2002, and books and accessories for the device were the best-selling toy in the US in 2003. LeapFrog opened its LeapFrog Schoolhouse division, which markets LeapFrog products directly to schools, in 1999.

=== 2003–present: Going public and acquisition by VTech ===
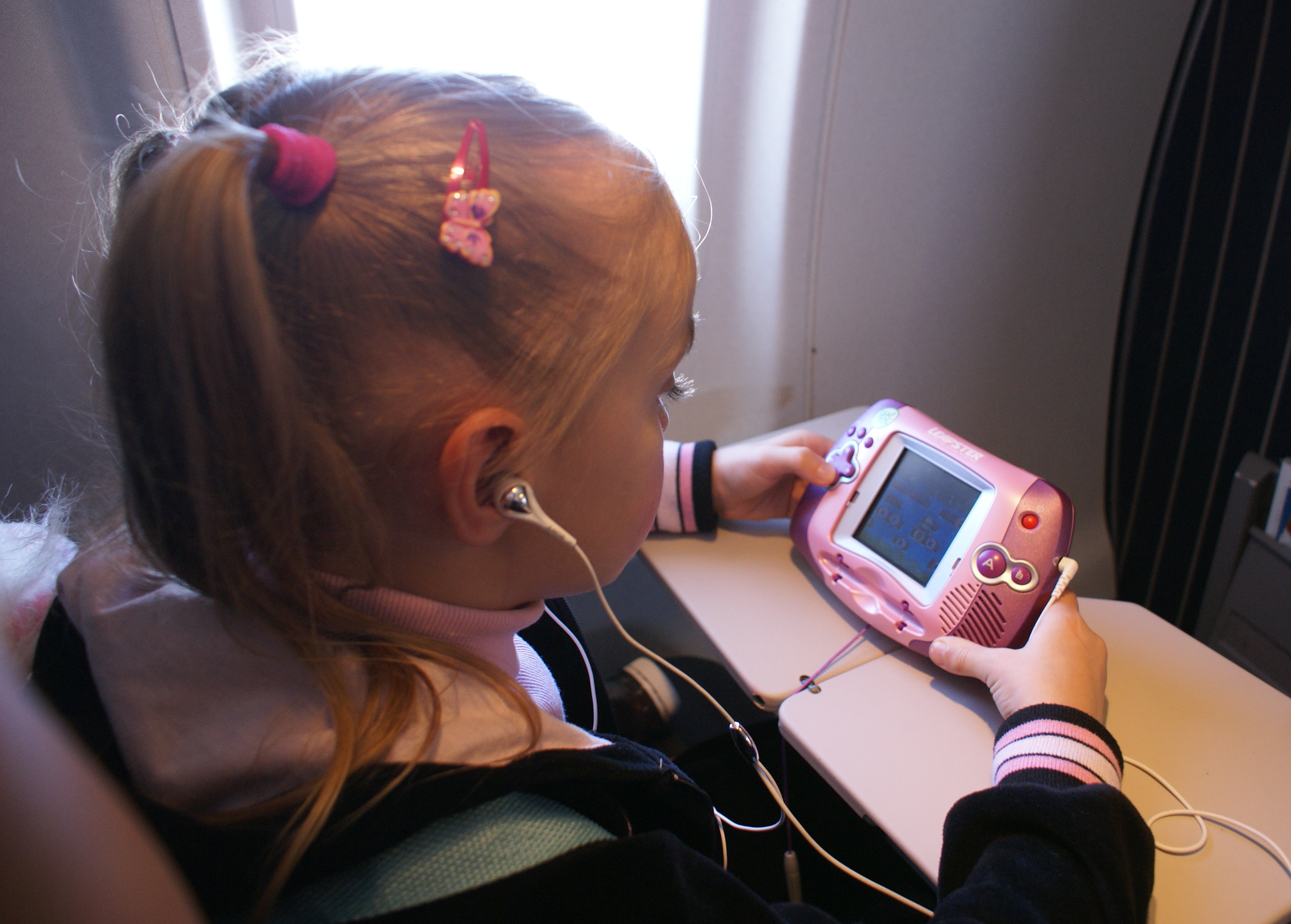
A girl with a Leapster

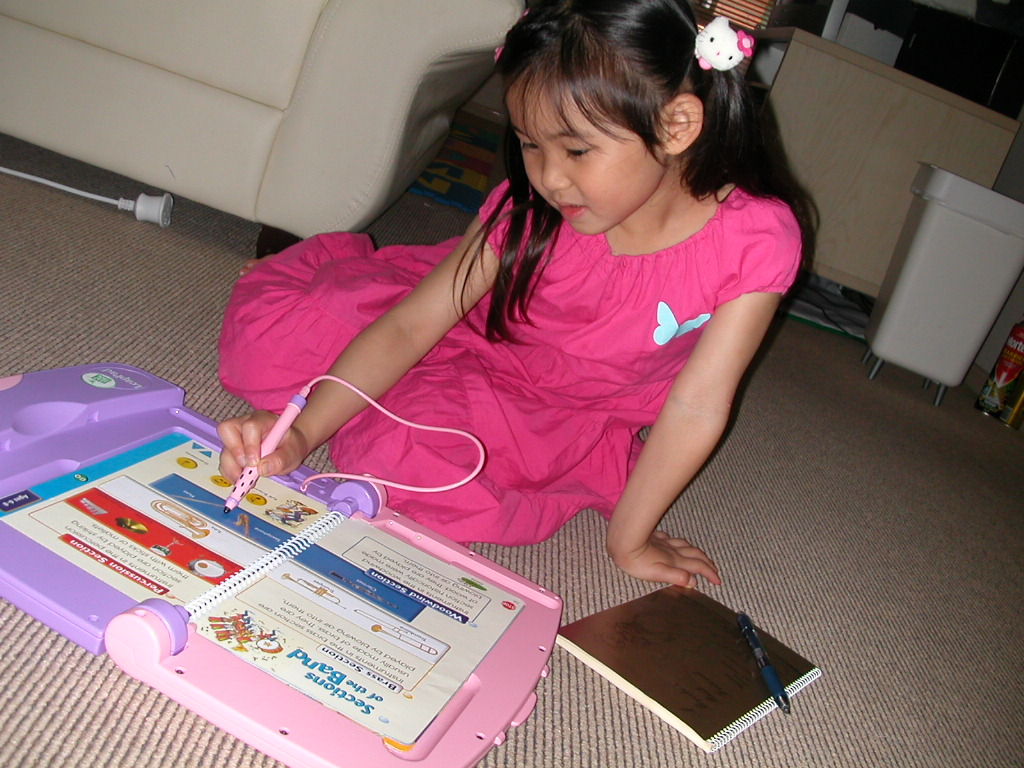
A girl with a LeapPad

LeapFrog co-founder Michael Wood became the company's chief executive officer in early 2002. In July, LeapFrog went public on the New York Stock Exchange under the ticker symbol LF. Knowledge Universe retained majority control of the company following the initial public offering. Sega Toys and Benesse also began producing LeapFrog toys localized for the Japanese market in 2002. The Leapster was released in October 2003. LeapFrog products were sold in more than 25 countries by that year. Tom Kalinske was appointed LeapFrog chief executive officer following Michael Wood's retirement in February 2004. Kalinske had previously served as LeapFrog's chief executive officer from the company's acquisition by Knowledge Universe in 1997 until early 2002. Wood was retained as the company's chief creative officer. Jeffrey G. Katz replaced Kalinske as LeapFrog chief executive officer in 2006. Katz was previously the founding chairman and chief executive officer of Orbitz and had served on the LeapFrog board for a year prior to becoming the chief executive officer of LeapFrog. Kalinske remained vice chairman of LeapFrog.

LeapFrog discontinued the LeapPad and released its Tag Reading System in June 2008. Tag became LeapFrog's flagship product and was a successor to the 10-year-old LeapPad. The company released its Leapster2 portable learning system and its Didj educational handheld game console in August 2008.

William "Bill" Chiasson replaced Jeffrey Katz as LeapFrog president and chief executive officer in March 2010. Chiasson had most recently served as LeapFrog chief financial officer. Katz was appointed to the newly created position of executive chairman of the board. LeapFrog also released the Leapster Explorer educational handheld game console in 2010. The Leapster Explorer was the successor to the Leapster2 and was targeted toward older children. The console supports online gameplay as well as learning apps, e-books, and videos. John Barbour was named the chief executive officer of LeapFrog in March 2011. Barbour previously served as an executive for Toys "R" Us and RealNetworks.

LeapFrog released the LeapPad Explorer educational tablet computer in 2011. The LeapPad Explorer was designed for children aged four to nine and contained a five-inch touchscreen, camera, microphone, and both downloadable apps and cartridge-based games. In 2012, LeapFrog released its updated LeapPad2 and LeapsterGS. The LeapPad Ultra tablet computer and LeapReader were launched in 2013. The LeapReader is an electronic reading and writing system that succeeded the Tag Reading System which only taught reading skills.

The company released LeapBand, its first wearable activity tracker for children, in 2014. LeapFrog also released its LeapPad3 and LeapPad Ultra XDi tablet devices in 2014. In July 2014, the company announced the release of LeapTV. They also got net loss for $124 million and had net sales of $145 million. In August 2015, the company announced LeapFrog Epic, its Android-based tablet for children, which was released in September 2015.

On April 4, 2016, VTech completed its $72 million acquisition of LeapFrog.

On April 10, 2025, founder Michael Wood died at the age of 72 by physician-assisted suicide in Switzerland after being diagnosed with Alzheimer's disease.

== Products ==
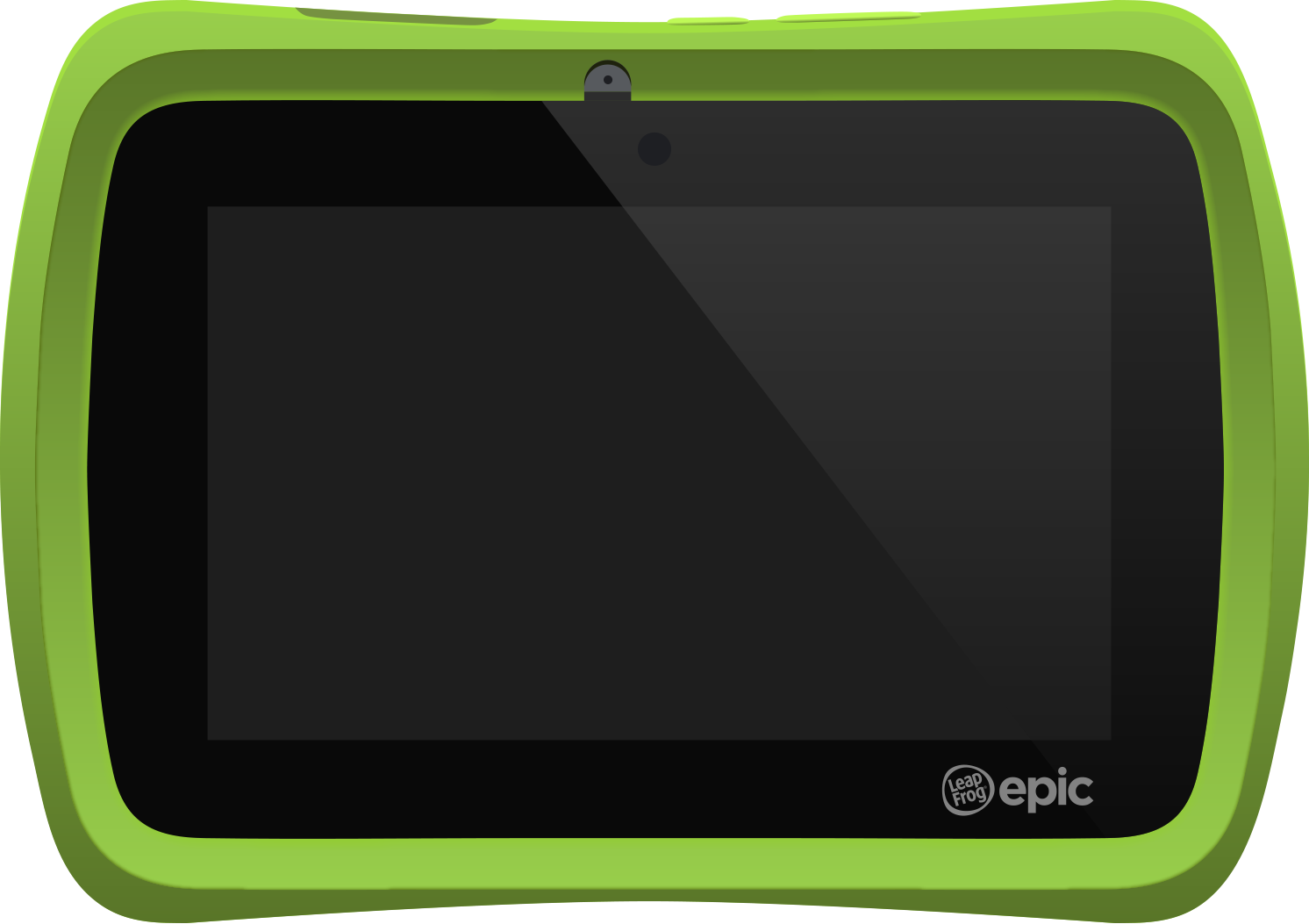
LeapFrog Epic

LeapFrog's product portfolio focuses on three main families of products: reading solutions, educational gaming, and grade school products and learning toys. Notable products include:

- LeapFrog Epic – An Android-based tablet for children aged 3‍–‍9. The tablet runs on the Android KitKat operating system, with a quad-core MediaTek MT8127 processor, 7" multi-touch capacitive screen, front and back camera, video recorder, 16GB of storage and a battery that lasts for six hours. The product was released in September 2015 and its MSRP is US$139.99. An updated variant of the Epic called Academy Edition was released in 2017, with a redesigned silicone protective bumper and access to the LeapFrog Academy program. Another updated variant called the LeapPad Academy was released in 2019; like the Epic Academy Edition before it, this came with access to the LeapFrog Academy program and a silicone bumper with a built-in kickstand. The LeapPad Academy later received a hardware revision in 2021 which replaced the MT8127 system-on-a-chip with a Rockchip RK3326.
- LeapTV – A TV connected video game console that uses motion control. The console has a TV connected camera that tracks motion control of both the controller and the player's body. Like any other current video game console, it has games available in cartridge or download form. The console's release was announced in July 2014 and it was launched two months later in September. LeapTV is aimed at children aged 3‍–‍8.
- LeapBand – A wearable activity tracker for children aged 4‍–‍7. LeapBand is a wristband that gives commands such as "wiggle like a worm" or "pop like popcorn." Children earn joules of energy gems by completing challenges, playing the built-in games, moving around in Move Mode, and using the stopwatch. Once they earn enough joules, they receive rewards, such as new toys and favorite foods for their pet, getting a new pet, and leveling up their pets.
- LeapReader – A specially designed stylus that reads audio books aloud and teaches basic writing skills. The device is similar to LeapFrog's Tag Reading System, although the Tag system did not teach writing skills as does LeapReader. LeapReader was released in July 2013.
- LeapStart – A newer family of products including the LeapStart was announced in 2016; the LeapStart 3D was released in 2018, and the LeapStart Go was released in 2019. These also include a stylus for reading content on specially patterned books but the LeapStart system is not compatible with the earlier Tag and LeapReader books.
- LeapPad Explorer Line (Including the LeapPad Explorer, LeapPad2, LeapPad Ultra, LeapPad3 and theUltra XDi) – The second line of LeapPad products are personalized learning tablets designed for children aged 4‍–‍9. When children set up the LeapPad, they enter their grade level and LeapPad automatically adjusts its games and applications to suit the given grade level. The existing library of Leapster Explorer game cartridges and apps is cross-compatible with LeapPad. LeapPad Explorer was released in August 2011, the LeapPad2 was released in August 2012, and the LeapPad3 and LeapPad Ultra XDi were released in 2014.
- Leapster/Leapster L-Max/Leapster2/Leapster Explorer/LeapsterGS Explorer – Portable learning systems for children aged 4‍–‍10 with a large library of cartridge games and downloadable learning apps, including e-books, videos, games, and flashcards. The original Leapster was released in 2003. The company subsequently released the Leapster2 in 2008 and Leapster Explorer in 2010. The LeapsterGS Explorer was released in 2012.
- Tag Reading System – A specially designed stylus that has a small infrared camera at the tip that "reads" letters, words and symbols printed on the special dot-patterned pages of books in the Tag library. The system is designed to help children aged 4‍–‍8 learn to read. In 2009, the company released Tag Junior, a system designed for children aged 1‍–‍4.
- My Pal Scout – A customizable plush toy that can be programmed with various songs and the owner's name and preferences. Additionally, LeapFrog produced various other toys, including toy vehicles, interactive plushes, and toys for the infant market. LeapFrog later released Read with Me Scout, a plush toy that can read aloud books from its product line.
- The original LeapPad – A series of now-discontinued educational devices. The products in this family varied in design, but all accepted an insertion cartridge to be used with a book that was placed in the device. The cartridge was activated when a child used a specially designed stylus to touch pictures, words, and shapes in the book. The device would then sound out the touched word, name the shape, or relay information about the picture. The LeapPad was LeapFrog's flagship product from 1999 until it was discontinued in late 2007 (early to mid-2008 outside the US). It was replaced as LeapFrog's flagship product by the Tag reading system.
- LeapMove - a motion-based learning system that uses full-body motion detection to allow children to appear on screen as different characters in educational games.

== Smartphone applications ==
Leapfrog also develops educational applications for smartphones. These apps include:

- 'Scout's ABC Garden' App – An iOS application that was released in April 2011. The app encourages children to explore letter names and sounds step-by-step, and each child's experience can be customized based on his or her name, favorite food, favorite color and favorite animal.
- Creativity Camera – An iOS application that allows children to take and edit pictures. The application also contains an augmented reality game where users can take pictures of imaginary fairies. Creativity Camera comes with a child-friendly phone case that is shaped like a camera. The app and phone case were launched in 2013.
- Mr. Pencil: Learn to Write – An iOS application that works with a stylus accessory to teach users basic writing skills. It requires iOS 5.0 or later. The app was released in 2013.

== Licensing and partnerships ==
In addition to producing their own toys, LeapFrog also licenses their characters (the Leapfrog Learning Friends) to third parties:

- Kiddieland Limited produces ride-on toys, tricycles, and scooters
- Masterpieces Puzzles produces jigsaw puzzles
- Learning Horizons produces books and various stationeries

LeapFrog also has partnerships with various companies:

- Sega Toys and Benesse produce localized versions of the toys for the Japanese market.
- Macromedia co-developed the Leapster handheld gaming console.
- Lionsgate Home Entertainment has released Leapfrog Learning DVDs series of educational DVDs since 2009, beginning with Let's Go To School. Warner Home Video released LeapFrog Learning VHSs and DVDs from 2003 until 2005. PorchLight Entertainment produced all LeapFrog Learning DVDs prior to 2008.

== LeapFrog Learning Friends ==
The core set of Leapfrog Learning Friends as seen on the Learn to Read at the Storybook Factory DVD

LeapFrog has developed various characters for use in-house, and eventually licensed the characters for use in third party products. These characters are collectively known as the Leapfrog Learning Friends. LeapFrog continues to develop new characters and has expanded character placement across products and content. Characters include Leap, Lily, Tad, Della, Dan, Dot, Casey, Parker, Tim, Mr. Frog, Mrs. Frog, Mr. Websley, Professor Quigley, and Edison. Most of the characters have been discontinued since 2008, but continued to appear on the LeapFrog Tag Learning System, the LeapFrog eBooks, the Leapster Explorer, the LeapPad Explorer, and re-released DVDs.

== Animated videos ==
In 2003, LeapFrog began releasing animated content based on the LeapFrog characters onto home video. Over the course of more than a decade, various interpretations of the LeapFrog franchise have been used, and sixteen videos total have been produced. Similar to other preschool content from PBS Kids, Nick Jr., and Disney Jr., LeapFrog is an early educational program designed for children in the age group of 2 to 7 years. The videos and DVDs were originally distributed by PorchLight Home Entertainment and Lionsgate Home Entertainment.

The original wave of videos stars a family of anthropomorphic frogs; consisting of siblings Leap, Lily, and Tad, and their parents, Mr. and Mrs. Frog. Other major characters include Professor Quigley, an eccentric professor who usually helps the frogs children learn educational concepts, and Mr. Websley, the boss of Quigley and Mr. Frog who runs the factories. This wave of videos teach basic early learning skills that would become recurring features in future videos, including the alphabet, reading, spelling, numbers, and addition, and subtraction.

The second wave phased out most of the "Learning Friends" characters, only leaving the Frog siblings as the main characters. However, these videos would see the addition of two new major characters: Edison, an anthropomorphic firefly previously seen in A Tad of Christmas Cheer, and Scout, a green dog introduced in 2007 as the company's mascot. Scout would be spun-off into his own series in 2011, which introduced a new cast of characters that include a lavender dog named Violet, a hamster named Penny, a blue cat named Eli, and an anthropomorphic car named Axle.

The final wave of videos were animated using CGI and revived the Letter Factory, the featured location of the company's first video.

=== Films ===
==== Original series (2003–2007) ====
- Letter Factory (December 9, 2003/May 12, 2009)
- Talking Words Factory (December 9, 2003)
- Talking Words Factory 2: Code Word Caper (November 16, 2004)
- Math Circus (November 16, 2004)
- Learn to Read at the Storybook Factory (September 20, 2005)
- A Tad of Christmas Cheer (October 30, 2007)

==== Second series (2008–2011) ====
- Sing and Learn with Us! (2008)
- Let's Go to School (August 18, 2009)
- Math Adventure to the Moon (February 23, 2010)
- The Amazing Alphabet Amusement Park (January 18, 2011)
- Numbers Ahoy! (January 18, 2011)

==== Scout & Friends (2011–2013) ====
- Phonics Farm (November 8, 2011)
- Numberland (January 31, 2012)
- Adventures in Shapeville Park (2013)
- The Magnificent Museum of Opposite Words (2013)

==== Letter Factory Adventures (2014–2015) ====
- The Letter Machine Rescue Team (March 4, 2014)
- Counting on Lemonade (September 9, 2014)
- Amazing Word Explorers (2015)
- The Great Shape Mystery (September 8, 2015)

== See also ==
- Educational software
- Interactive children's books
