= Incidence =

Incidence may refer to:

== Economics ==
- Benefit incidence, the availability of a benefit
- Expenditure incidence, the effect of government expenditure upon the distribution of private incomes
- Fiscal incidence, the economic impact of government taxation and expenditures on the economic income of individuals
- Tax incidence, analysis of the effect of a particular tax on the distribution of economic welfare

== Mathematics ==
- Incidence algebra, associative algebra used in combinatorics, a branch of mathematics
- Incidence geometry, the study of relations of incidence between various geometrical objects
- Incidence (geometry), the binary relations describing how subsets meet
- Incidence (graph), in graph theory, a quality of some vertex-edge pairs
- Incidence list, a concept in graph theory
- Incidence matrix, a matrix that shows the relationship between two classes of objects
- Incidence structure, a feature of combinatorial mathematics
- Cumulative incidence, a measure of frequency

== Other uses ==
- Angle of incidence, a measure of deviation of something from "straight on"
- Incidence (epidemiology), a measure of the risk of developing some new condition within a specified period of time
- Plane of incidence, relating to optical reflection
- Incidence (video game), a minimalist golfing style game by ScrollView Games

== See also ==
- Incidents, 1987 book
- Incident (disambiguation)
