= Terebikko =

Video game console

- Also known as: See 'n Say Video Phone (US)
- Manufacturer: Bandai
- Type: Home video game console
- Lifespan: JP: 1988; US: 1989
- Introductory price: ¥5,000 (Japan)
- Discontinued: 1994
- Media: VHS
- Controller input: Phone

The Terebikko (Japanese: てれびっこ) is an interactive VHS console game system released in Japan by Bandai in 1988. Titles released included a wide variety of known franchises, such as Super Mario World, Dragon Ball Z, and many more. The system was also released in the U.S. as the See 'n Say Video Phone by Mattel in 1989.

== Gameplay ==
This system has the shape of a toy phone, and is connected to the TV's audio output jack. It has four large main buttons numbered 1 to 4, each with a different color (red, blue, green, yellow).

Throughout the video, the viewer receives calls from characters on-screen, and answers questions using the telephone. The phone uses signals from the video (inaudible through the built-in speaker), to interact with the viewer, as such for giving bad or good answers.

== Games ==
- Pocket Zaurus: Party Island no Nakamatachi 1
- Pocket Zaurus: Party Island no Nakamatachi 2
- Obake no Q-Tarō: Oba Q Channel
- Moomin no Sutekina Present
- Hello! Lady Lynn: Yume no wo Heya ni Youkoso!
- Yu Hayami no American Kids: Eigō de Tango
- Yu Hayami no American Kids: Eigō de Bikkuri
- Yu Hayami no American Kids: Eigō de Talk
- Soreike! Anpanman: Karada no Naka no Dai Bōken
- Soreike! Anpanman: Yukai nao Tanjōe
- Soreike! Anpanman: Panya-san te donna toko?
- Soreike! Anpanman: Norimono Iroiro Daibouken
- Soreike! Anpanman: Waku Waku Suizokukan 1 - Suizokukan de ikō
- Soreike! Anpanman: Waku Waku Suizokukan 2 - Anpanman Gō Umi no Tanken
- Soreike! Anpanman: Nakayoshi Dōbutsu Land 1 - Ninkimono Atsumare!
- Soreike! Anpanman: Nakayoshi Dōbutsu Land 2 - Afurika no Nakamatachi!
- Mahōtsukai Sarī: Asutorea Palace no Party
- Super Mario World Mario to Yoshi no Bōken Land
- Hello Kitty: Hello Kitty no tanoshī okaimono
- Kero Kero Keroppi: Issho ni asobō
- Dragon Ball Z: Gather Together! Goku's World
- Ultraman
- Ultraseven
- Doraemon: Doraemon no nandemo Quiz Poketto
- Sailor Moon S: Kotaete Moon Call

== See also ==
- View-Master Interactive Vision
- Action Max
