= Incident (disambiguation) =

An incident is an unplanned situation necessitating a response.

Incident(s) may also refer to:

- A property of a graph in graph theory
- Incident, a 1948 noir
- Incident, a 2023 American documentary short film by Bill Morrison
- Incident (festival), a cultural festival of The National Institute of Technology in Surathkal, Karnataka, India
- Incident (Scientology), a concept in Scientology
- Incident ray, a ray of light that strikes a surface
- "Incident", a 1925 poem by Countee Cullen
- Incidents, a 1987 collection of four essays by Roland Barthes
- Incidents (magazine), a magazine published in Iran

== See also ==
- Accident
- The Incident (disambiguation)
- Incidence (disambiguation)
- Incident management (ITSM), an IT service management process to identify and correct service operation failures
- Incident management, the activities of an organization to identify, analyze and correct organizational hazards
- Nuclear and radiation accidents and incidents, an irregularity with a nuclear installation not classified as a nuclear accident
