= The Incident =

The Incident may refer to:

== Films ==
- The Incident (1967 film), a film starring Beau Bridges and Martin Sheen
- The Incident (1978 film), a Japanese film by Yoshitaro Nomura
- The Incident (1990 film), a film starring Walter Matthau and Harry Morgan
- The Incident (2011 film), a French film
- The Incident (2014 film), a Mexican film

== TV shows ==
- "The Incident" (Lost)
- "The Incident" (Modern Family)

== Music ==
- The Incident (album), a 2009 album by Porcupine Tree
- "The Incident", a song by Michelle Williams from the album Do You Know, 2004

== Other uses ==
- The Incident (conspiracy), an event in British history
- The Incident (video game), a 2010 video game for iOS and Mac OS X

== See also ==
- Incident (disambiguation)
