= François Wahl =

French editor and structuralist

- Born: May 13, 1925; Paris, France
- Died: September 15, 2014 (aged 89); Avilly-Saint-Léonard, France

François Wahl (French: [val]; 13 May 1925 – 15 September 2014) was a French editor and structuralist.

== Biography ==
François Wahl was an editor at the Éditions du Seuil, a publishing company in Paris. He was the editor of Jacques Lacan and Jacques Derrida, among others.

He was involved in the publication of Tel Quel. and he became friends with Roland Barthes and Philippe Sollers. He was Severo Sarduy's partner until the latter's death. He also taught philosophy to Elie Wiesel in the 1940s.

In 1987, Wahl, acting as Roland Barthes's literary executor, published his essays Incidents, which tells of his homosexual encounters with Moroccan young men, and Soirées de Paris, which chronicles his difficulty in finding a male lover in Paris. Wahl met with controversy, compounded by the fact that he refused to publish more of Barthes's seminars.
