= The Incident (video game) =

2010 platform video game

- Developer: Big Bucket Software
- Publisher: Big Bucket Software
- Platforms: iOS, OS X
- Release: iOS: WW: August 10, 2010; OS X: WW: January 6, 2011
- Genre: Platform
- Mode: Single-player

The Incident is a 2010 platform game developed and published by Australian studio Big Bucket Software. It was released on August 10, 2010, for iOS devices and on January 6, 2011, for OS X (via the Mac App Store).

== Gameplay ==
The player, climbing the growing pile of falling items, is nearing a checkpoint (represented by a rope of flags). On the left, a "curse" ballon floats up; on the right, a "boost" power-up.

Two game modes are available for play in the game: a level-by-level campaign, titled "The Rise and Fall of Frank Solway", and an endless mode, titled "Endless Nightfall".

The basic gameplay involves random objects falling from the sky, as the player tries to avoid getting hit. The game is controlled by tilting the device to move left or right and tapping on the touchscreen to jump. As the game progresses, the pile of objects gets taller and less stable. At random intervals, diamonds will fall that grant the player an extra life if collected; each level has a certain number of diamonds and the amount collected is recorded on the stage select screen. Also, balloons arise from below the pile, carrying power-ups, such as coins (ten coins gives the player an extra life), a protective helmet that shields the player from damage for a limited time, an extra health unit (which cannot be replenished once lost), an item that scrolls the screen up or down, or a skull that damages the player (referred to as an "Ancient Curse"). If the player becomes stuck in the middle of the pile, shaking the device may form a bubble that floats the player back to the top. However, this is an unreliable feature.

"The Rise and Fall of Frank Solway" contains seven levels, in which the player is required to climb 130 meters for the first five stages and 100 meters for the final two. To aid in this, several checkpoints are present throughout each level. Once a checkpoint is crossed, the player can restart from that position after dying, with one replenished health unit.

Death can occur by the player being pushed off-screen by the pile or losing all health units. Items that kill the player are recorded in a museum and shown by name on the death screen (e.g. "Death by Taxi").

== Plot ==
Frank Solway, an average Joe, is having an ordinary day. As he tries to hail a cab, he notices that the streets are eerily empty. He then notices something above him — which turns out to be a cab falling from the sky. He dodges it, only to find more objects of all descriptions raining down on him: sofas, houseplants, vending machines, pianos. Frank keeps dodging the falling debris and climbs the ever-growing pile. Gradually he rises above the city, past the nearby mountains, and into the sky, eventually leaving Earth's orbit and reaching outer space, where he hopes to discover the source of the falling objects.

Frank eventually floats into a white void with what appears to be a portal in the middle. A slightly older Frank approaches from the other side. It is revealed that the older Frank also attempted to hail a cab, but instead it was sucked into the air, followed by other objects from his world; the portal drew objects from one world and deposited them in the other. Finally, the two Franks touch the portal together, causing a bright light to fall on Frank's town, saving his world.

After the game is cleared once, the player can play through it again in "Beard Mode", as the older Frank.

== Updates ==
Since its initial release, the game has had two major updates. The 1.2 update allows players to use their iPhone or iPod Touch as a controller, while using an iPad as a screen. The 1.3 update allows players to use a video cable with a suitable adapter attached to the iPad's dock connector to play the game on a television set or computer monitor, with the graphics reformatted to fit an HDTV screen.

== Reception ==
The Incident
(iOS version)

Aggregate scores
Aggregator	Score
GameRankings	85.71%
Metacritic	82/100

Review scores
Publication	Score
1Up.com	B+
IGN	7.5/10
Gamezebo	8/10
Pocket Gamer	7/10
TouchGen	4.5/5

The Incident was met with mainly positive reviews. The iOS version holds an aggregate score of 82 out of 100 on Metacritic, based on sixteen reviews, and 85.71% on GameRankings, based on seven reviews.

The graphical style of the game, which was designed to emulate 8-bit games, has been widely praised. Kotaku called it "attractively visually designed." TouchGen saw it as "a visual homage to games of yesteryear." Boing Boing's Brandon Broyer referred to it as "a simple idea executed with fantastic style." Gamezebo wrote, "the retro 8-bit presentation absolutely sparkles."

Kotaku's editor Michael McWhertor was impressed with the overall game. He criticized the high difficulty near the end, but concluded that "it was the game's more clever references that appealed to me more than its graphics. There are amusing nods to films like 2001: A Space Odyssey and Back to the Future and pop culture sources like Neon Genesis Evangelion and Mystery Science Theater 3000. The Incident tickles your geek side expertly." McWhertor later referred to the game as "one of my favorite iPhone games of 2010", stating, "I'm still surprisingly wowed by the option for wireless iPhone control."

Gamezebo's Jim Squires scored the game 8 out of 10, writing "players looking for an accessible yet frantic arcade-style experience are going to really dig what The Incident has to offer [...] If you're looking for a new experience with old school arcade-style simplicity, The Incident is one item you'll want to catch." They also praised the music and sound design. IGN's Levi Buchanan rated the game 7.5 out of 10, writing, "The Incident is a prime example of how the best iPhone games are simple ideas, perfectly executed. The climb from the street to the stars is terrifically fun and addictive." TouchGen's Nigel Wood scored it 4.5 out of 5, writing, "The Incident is an incredibly cool game, delivering addictive arcade platforming wrapped in classic packaging. It's a budget beauty!"

Pocket Gamer's Tracy Erickson scored the game 7 out of 10, arguing that it was enjoyable in the short term only; "The Incident is entertaining for a few short minutes, yet its one-dimensional gameplay limits the long-lasting fun [...] An amusing game of evasion, The Incident holds little in the way of lasting appeal." Cole Jones of 1UP rated it B+, feeling the gameplay became somewhat repetitive; "if you try to play for a couple hours straight, its repetitive nature starts to shine through. You'll enjoy this clever platformer, but only in short spurts." Christopher Healy of Common Sense Media gave the game four stars out of five, describing "an old-school arcade dodging game with a sense of humor."
