= Severo Sarduy =

Cuban writer (1937-1993)

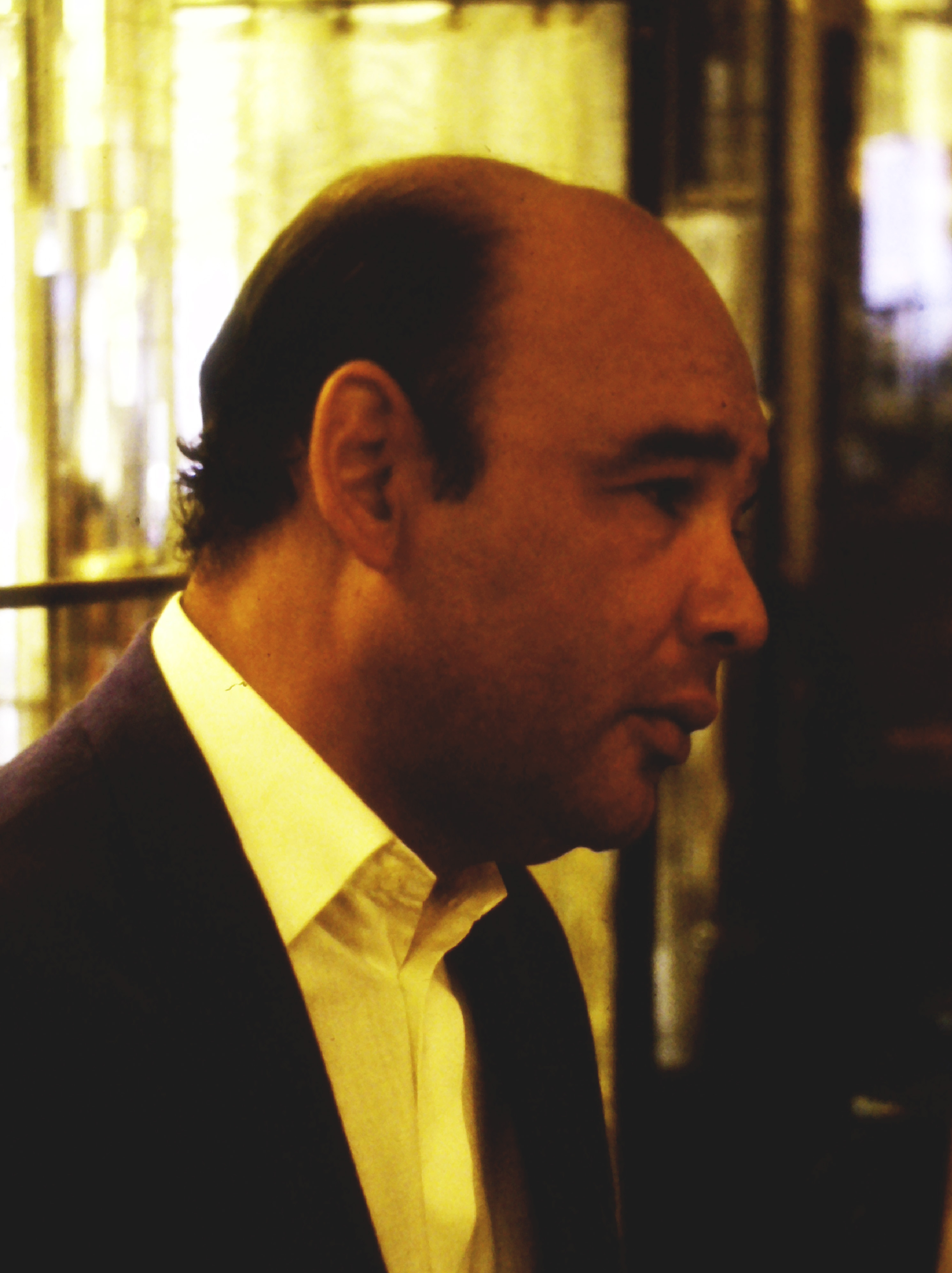
- Born: February 25, 1937; Camagüey, Cuba
- Died: June 8, 1993 (aged 56); Paris, France
- Occupations: Poet, author, playwright, literary critic, art critic
- Years active: 1963-1993

Severo Sarduy (February 25, 1937 – June 8, 1993) was a Cuban poet, author, playwright, and critic of Cuban literature and art. Some of his works deal explicitly with male homosexuality and transvestism.

== Biography ==
Born in a working-class family of Spanish, African, and Chinese heritage, Sarduy was the top student in his high school, in Camagüey, and in 1956 moved to Havana, where he began a study of medicine. With the triumph of the Cuban revolution he contributed to the pro-Marxist papers Diario libre and Lunes de revolución. In 1960 he traveled to Paris to study at the Ecole du Louvre. There he was connected to the group of intellectuals who produced the magazine Tel Quel, particularly to philosopher François Wahl, with whom he was openly involved

Sarduy worked as a reader for Editions du Seuil and as editor and producer of the Radiodiffusion-Télévision Française. Sarduy decided not to return to Cuba when his scholarship ran out a year later. Disaffected with Castro's regime and fearful of its persecution of homosexuals and the censorship imposed on writers, Sarduy never went home.

In 1972, his novel Cobra won him the Medici Prize for best novel in translation. He was among the most brilliant essayists writing in Spanish and "a powerful baroque narrator, full of surprising resources." As a poet, he was considered one of the greatest of his time. He was also a more or less secret painter; a major retrospective of his work was held at the Reina Sofía Museum of Madrid after his death.

He died due to complications from AIDS just after finishing his autobiographical work Pájaros de la playa (translated as Beach Birds by Suzanne Jill Levine and Carol Maier). To this day, his writings are difficult to access for a Cuban audience, whereas his books are available to the French and international public.

== Bibliography ==
=== Novels ===
- Gestos (1963)
- De dónde son los cantantes (1967). From Cuba with a Song, trans. Suzanne Jill Levine in Triple Cross (Dutton, 1972), later reprinted as a standalone (Sun & Moon Press, 1994)
- Cobra (1972). Cobra, trans. Suzanne Jill Levine (Dutton, 1975)
- Maitreya (1978). Maitreya, trans. Suzanne Jill Levine (Ediciones del Norte, 1987)
- Colibrí (1984)
- Cocuyo (1990). Firefly, trans. Mark Fried (Archipelago Books, 2013)
- Pájaros de la playa (1993). Beach Birds, trans. Suzanne Jill Levine and Carol Maier (Otis Books/Seismicity Editions, 2007)

=== Poems ===
- Flamenco (1970)
- Mood Indigo (1971)
- Big Bang (1974)
- Daiquiri (1980)
- Un testigo fugaz y disfrazado (1985)
- Un testigo perenne y dilatado (1993)
- Lucidez (Signos, 1988)

=== Essays ===
- Escrito sobre un cuerpo (1969). Written on a Body, trans. Carol Maier (Lumen Books, 1989)
- Barroco (1974)
- La simulación (1982)
- El cristo de la Rue Jacob (1987). Christ on the Rue Jacob, trans. Suzanne Jill Levine and Carol Maier (Mercury House, 1995)
- Nueva inestabilidad (1987)
- Ensayos generales sobre el barroco (1987)

=== Radio Plays ===
- La playa (1971)
- La caída (1971)
- Relato (1971)
- Los matadores de Hormigas (1971)
- Para la voz (1977). For Voice, trans. Philip Barnard (Latin American Literary Review Press, 1985)

=== Compilations in English ===
- Cobra and Maitreya, trans. Suzanne Jill Levine (Dalkey Archive, 1995)
- Footwork: Selected Poems, trans. David Francis (Circumference Books, 2021)
- Barroco and Other Writings, trans. Alex Verdolini (Stanford University Press, 2024)
