= BBC Bridge Companion =

British 8-bit video game console

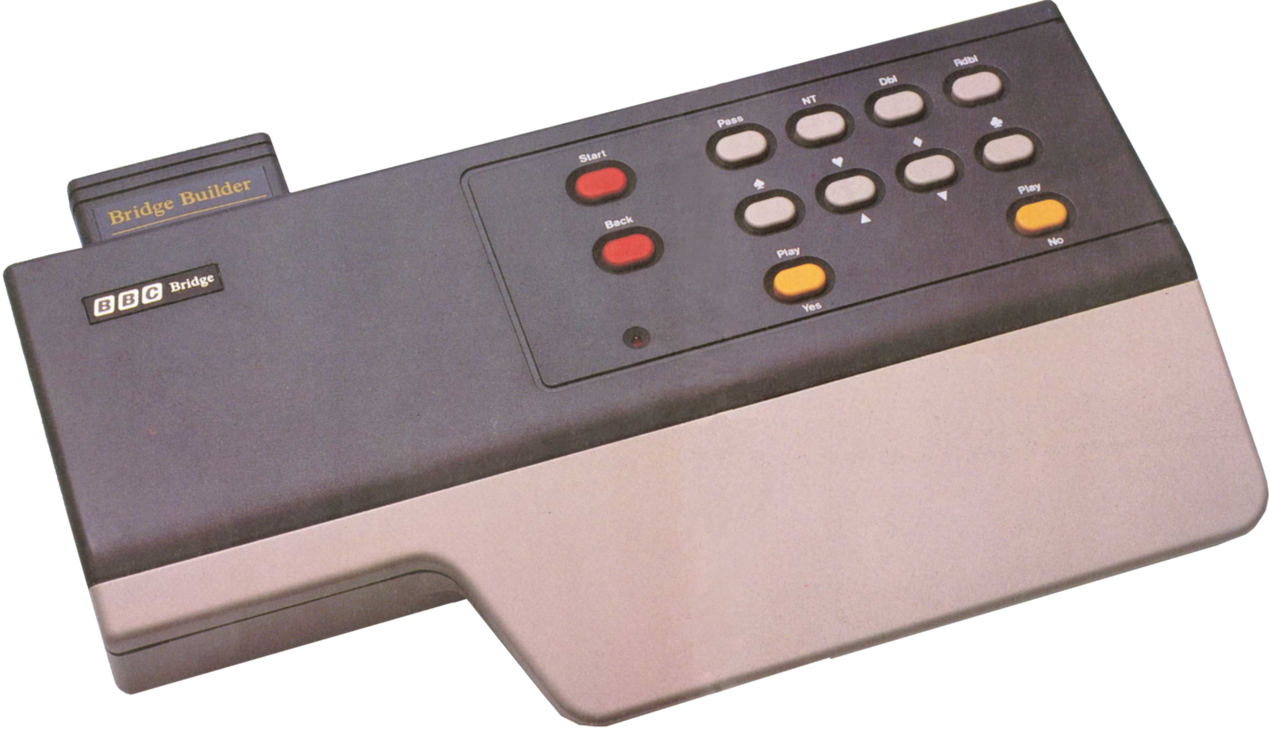
- BBC Bridge Companion with a Bridge Builder cartridge inserted
- Developer: BBC Enterprises Ltd, Unicard Ltd
- Manufacturer: Heber
- Type: Home video game console
- Generation: Third generation
- Released: 1985; 41 years ago
- Introductory price: £199.99 (equivalent to £619.42 in 2025)
- Media: ROM cartridge
- CPU: Zilog Z80A @ 3.579 MHz
- Memory: 2kB SRAM, 16kB VRAM, 16kB ROM
- Display: 280×216, 8 colours
- Graphics: Texas Instruments TMS9129NL
- Input: Keypad
- Power: 240V AC

The BBC Bridge Companion is an 8-bit video game console designed for teaching bridge, produced by BBC Enterprises Ltd. It was released in 1985 in the United Kingdom, retailing for £199.99 (equivalent to £619 in 2025).

== History ==
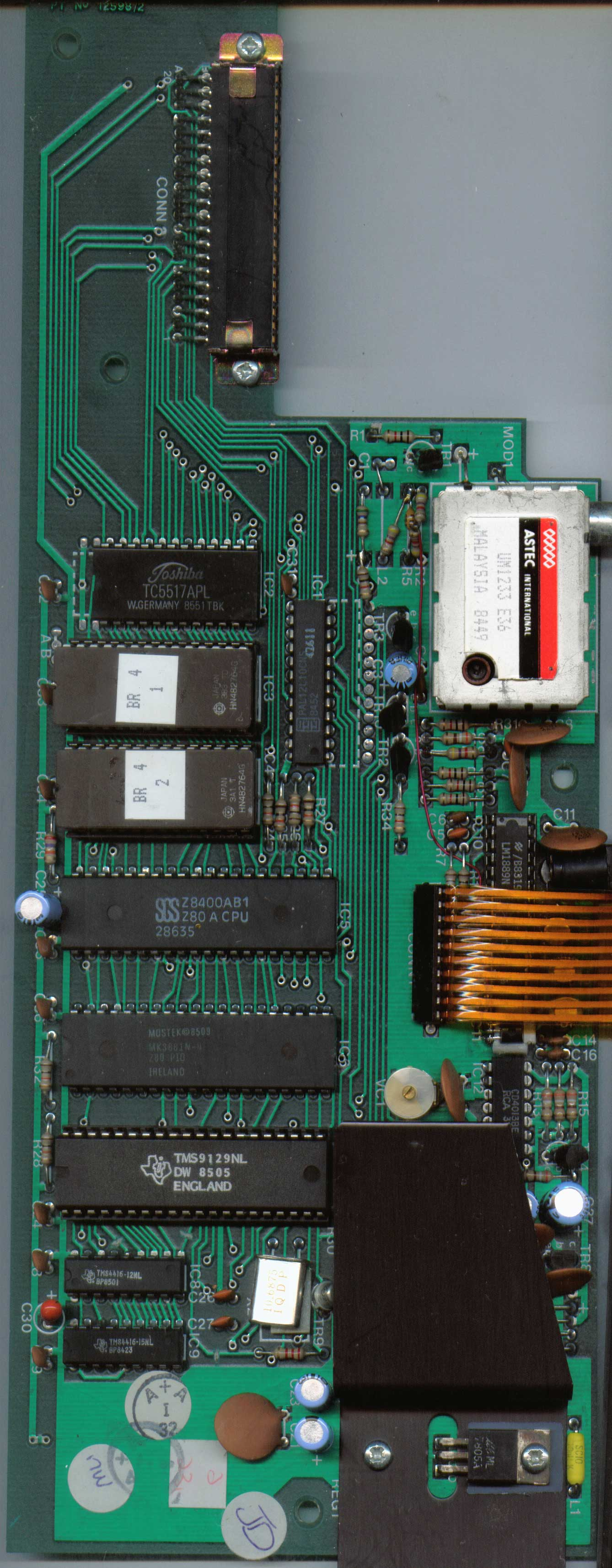
System PCB

Maths teacher Andrew Kambites wanted to generate income from bridge due to his love for the game. He would combine this with his programming background to develop the BBC Bridge Companion.

== List of cartridges ==
The software library consists entirely of interactive tutorials on different aspects of bridge.

- Advanced Bidding
- Advanced Defence
- Bridge Builder
- Club Play 1
- Club Play 2
- Club Play 3
- Conventions 1
- Duplicate 1
- Master Play 1
