= Benefit incidence =

Availability of a benefit

In economics, benefit incidence refers to the availability of a benefit. In the United States, the benefit incidence is calculated by the National Compensation Survey (NCS).

== See also ==
- Employee benefit
- Expenditure incidence
- National Compensation Survey
- Fiscal incidence
- Bureau of Labor Statistics
