= Third generation of video game consoles =

Gaming generation from 1983 to 2003

In the history of video games, the third generation of video game consoles, commonly referred to as the 8-bit era, began on July 15, 1983, with the Japanese release of two systems: Nintendo's Family Computer (commonly abbreviated to Famicom) and Sega's SG-1000. When the Famicom was released outside of Japan, it was remodeled and marketed as the Nintendo Entertainment System (NES). This generation marked the end of the North American video game crash of 1983, and a shift in the dominance of home video game manufacturers from the United States to Japan. Handheld consoles were not a major part of this generation; the Game & Watch line from Nintendo (which started in 1980) and the Milton Bradley Microvision (which came out in 1979) that were sold at the time are both considered part of the previous generation due to hardware typical of the second generation.

Improvements in technology gave consoles of this generation improved graphical and sound capabilities, comparable to the golden age of arcade games. The number of simultaneous colors on screen and the palette size both increased which, along with larger resolutions, more sprites on screen, and more advanced scrolling and pseudo-3D effects, allowed developers to create scenes with more detail and animation. Audio technology improved and gave consoles the ability to produce a greater variation and range of sound. A notable innovation of this generation was the inclusion of cartridges with on-board memory and batteries to allow users to save their progress in a game, with Nintendo's The Legend of Zelda introducing the technology to the worldwide market. This innovation allowed for much more expansive gaming worlds and in-depth storytelling, since users could now save their progress rather than having to start each gaming session at the beginning. By the next generation, the capability to save games became ubiquitous—at first saving on the game cartridge itself and, later, when the industry changed to read-only optical disks, on memory cards, hard disk drives, and eventually cloud storage.

The best-selling console of this generation was the NES/Famicom from Nintendo, followed by the Master System from Sega (the successor to the SG-1000), and the Atari 7800. Although the previous generation of consoles had also used 8-bit processors, it was at the end of the third generation that home consoles were first labeled and marketed by their "bits". This also came into fashion as fourth generation 16-bit systems like the Sega Genesis were marketed in order to differentiate between the generations. In Japan and North America, this generation was primarily dominated by the Famicom/NES, while the Master System dominated the Brazilian market, with the combined markets of Europe being more balanced in overall sales between the two main systems. The end of the third generation was marked by the emergence of 16-bit systems of the fourth generation and with the discontinuation of the Famicom on September 25, 2003. However, in some cases, the third generation still lives on as dedicated console units still use hardware from the Famicom specification, such as the VT02/VT03 and OneBus hardware.

== Overview ==
=== 1983–1984 ===
The Japanese video game market was still a growing "wide open" market for video game consoles in 1983. Japan had a relatively small console market, where only 300,000 consoles had been sold up until 1983, compared to the millions that had been sold in the United States up until then. A number of Japanese manufacturers attempted to compete for the "wide open" Japanese console market with their own consoles. The Epoch Cassette Vision, released in 1981, was the best-selling console in Japan at the time. It was followed by the Bandai Arcadia (priced ¥19,800), a Japanese version of the Arcadia 2001 released in 1982, and the Atari 2800 (priced ¥24,800), a Japanese version of the Atari 2600 marketed in May 1983.

The third generation of consoles began when two Japanese companies, Sega and Nintendo, decided to enter the console gaming market. On July 15, 1983, they both released new consoles in Japan, Sega's SG-1000 and Nintendo's Famicom. Both companies previously had success as arcade game companies. Sega, one of Japan's largest arcade companies, was intending to compete in both the console and personal computer markets, with a home computer version called the SC-3000 released at the same time. Meanwhile, Nintendo focused on making the Famicom more powerful than competing home systems so that it would be comparable to their Donkey Kong (1981) arcade video game hardware, while at the same time selling it for cheaper than the Cassette Vision, selling the Famicom for ¥14,800 (about $150). Nintendo unveiled the Famicom shortly before the Tokyo Toy Show in June 1983, becoming a sensation among toy show exhibitors, prior to Sega unveiling the SG-1000 at the Tokyo Toy Show.

The Famicom went on to become very popular in Japan, where it quickly beat the Cassette Vision to become Japan's all-time best-selling console. Sega would become Nintendo's main competitor for console sales during the era. Sega's SG-1000, which preceded Sega's more commercially successful Master System, initially had little to distinguish itself from earlier consoles such as the ColecoVision and contemporary computers such as the MSX, although it was able to achieve advanced visual effects, including parallax scrolling in Orguss and sprite-scaling in Zoom 909.

To enter the worldwide market, Nintendo approached the American company Atari, which had the majority share of the home video game market in North America, with a proposal for Atari to license the Famicom and distribute it. An agreement was concluded, which was to be signed at the Consumer Electronics Show in July 1983. At the same CES, however, Coleco exhibited its Coleco Adam home computer, which featured a version of Nintendo's Donkey Kong. At that time, Atari had exclusive rights to distribute Nintendo games on home computers, and Coleco had exclusive rights to distribute the game on consoles. However, since Atari understood that Adam was a home computer, they postponed signing the agreement with Nintendo and asked the company to resolve the issue with rights. The problem was resolved, but during this time, the video game crash of 1983 had occurred and Atari began to lose influence in the market. With this, Nintendo had no competitor left and the company eventually decided to enter the market on its own.

=== 1984–1986 ===
Nintendo was initially discouraged after the crash, with Nintendo of America's market research being met with warnings to stay away from home consoles and US retailers refusing to stock game consoles. As a result, Nintendo instead introduced the Famicom to North America in the form of an arcade hardware, the Nintendo VS. System, in 1984. It became a major success in North American arcades, giving Nintendo the confidence to release the Famicom in North America as a video game console, for which there was growing interest due to Nintendo's positive reputation in the arcades.

The company introduced a version of the Famicom in January 1985 at the Winter CES as the Nintendo Advanced Video System, abbreviated as the NAVS. The gamepads were wireless and worked with it using an infrared port, and the bundle would also include a light gun. It was planned that the NAVS would be available in the spring of 1985. However, this did not happen and the console was shown again at the summer CES in June of that year, as an updated version called the Nintendo Entertainment System. The system was released in October 1985 as an experiment within New York City bounds with Super Mario Bros. game bundled. The experiment was successful and showed that people still wanted to play games despite the 1983 crisis. After that, the system was released in all of North America in February 1986 at a price of US$159.

In 1985, Sega succeeded the SG-1000 with the Master System, which incorporated hardware scrolling, alongside an increased color palette, greater memory, pseudo-3D effects, and stereoscopic 3-D, gaining a clear hardware advantage over the NES. However, the NES continued to dominate the North American and Japanese markets, while the Master System had more success in the European and South American markets.

The Family Computer (commonly abbreviated the Famicom) became popular in Japan during this era, crowding out the other consoles in this generation. The Famicom's Western counterpart, the Nintendo Entertainment System, dominated the gaming market in North America, thanks in part to its restrictive licensing agreements with developers. This marked a shift in the dominance of home video games from the United States to Japan, to the point that Computer Gaming World described the "Nintendo craze" as a "non-event" for American video game designers as "virtually all the work to date has been done in Japan." The company had an estimated 65% of 1987 hardware sales in the console market; Atari Corporation had 24% (including the Atari 7800, 2600 Jr. and XEGS), Sega had 8%, and other companies had 3%.

=== 1986–2007 ===
The popularity of the Japanese consoles grew so quickly that in 1988 Epyx stated that, in contrast to a video game-hardware industry in 1984 that the company had described as "dead", the market for Nintendo cartridges was larger than for all home-computer software. Nintendo sold seven million NES systems in 1988, almost as many as the number of units the Commodore 64 sold in its first five years. In 1988, The Los Angeles Times reported that the rise of video game consoles had a positive impact on computer games, sales of which grew 37% during the first quarter of 1988. In 1989, however, Compute! reported that Nintendo's popularity caused most computer-game companies to have poor sales during Christmas that year, resulting in serious financial problems for some, and after more than a decade making computer games, in 1989 Epyx converted completely to console cartridges. By 1990 30% of American households owned the NES, compared to 23% for all personal computers, and peer pressure to have a console was so great that even the children of computer-game developers demanded them despite parents' refusal and the presence of state-of-the-art computers and software at home. As Computer Gaming World reported in 1992, "The kids who don't have access to videogames are as culturally isolated as the kids in our own generation whose parents refused to buy a TV".

This era contributed many influential aspects to the history of the development of video games. The third generation saw the release of many of the first console role-playing video games (RPGs). Editing and censorship of video games was often used in localizing Japanese games to North America. It was during this time that many successful video game franchises began, which went on to becoming mainstays of the video game industry. Some examples are Super Mario Bros., Final Fantasy, The Legend of Zelda, Dragon Quest, Metroid, Mega Man, Metal Gear, Castlevania, Phantasy Star, Megami Tensei, Ninja Gaiden, and Bomberman.

In Europe during the late 1980s, the Master System had a stronger start than the Nintendo Entertainment System in some areas, with NES sales lagging behind the Master System in the United Kingdom. By 1990, the Master System was the biggest-selling console in Europe, though the NES was beginning to have a fast-growing user base in the United Kingdom and this position had reversed by the end of the run of both consoles.

The third generation also saw the beginning of the children's educational console market. Due to their reduced capacities, these systems typically were not labeled by their "bits" and were not marketed in competition with traditional video game consoles.

In North America, the Atari 7800 and Master System were discontinued in 1992, while the NES continued to be produced until 1995. In Europe, the Master System was discontinued in the late 1990s. However, it has continued to sell in Brazil through to the present day. In Japan, Nintendo continued to repair Famicom systems until October 31, 2007.

== Home systems ==
=== Family Computer/Nintendo Entertainment System ===
The Family Computer (Famicom), released on July 15, 1983, in Japan and in the United States on October 18, 1985, as the redesigned Nintendo Entertainment System (NES), is an 8-bit cartridge-based console developed and marketed by Nintendo. It became the most popular console of the generation, selling over 60 million units. It was the first home system to feature a controller with a directional pad (designed by Gunpei Yokoi), which became an industry standard. While the NES was discontinued in North America on August 14, 1995, it was not until September 25, 2003, that the Famicom was discontinued in Japan.

=== Sega Mark III/Master System ===
The Sega Mark III was released on October 20, 1985, for the Japanese market and was the third iteration of the SG-1000. The name was changed to the Master System and the design altered for release outside of Japan. It was designed to be more powerful than the NES in an attempt to give it an edge over the competition but despite good sales, it did not match the success of the NES, making it the second best selling console of the generation. This was the case in all regions apart from Brazil, where it continued to sell for years after the end of the generation.

=== Atari 7800 ===
The Atari 7800 was released in May 1986 and was the successor to the Atari 5200. It was the first console to be backward compatible without additional hardware. It was originally due for launch on May 21, 1984, but due to the sale of the company the launch did not happen until two years later and, coupled with a small library of games, the console did not sell as well as the Master System or NES.

=== Comparison ===
Comparison of third-generation video game home consoles
Name		SG-1000	Sega Mark III/ Master System	Family Computer/ Nintendo Entertainment System	Atari 7800	Atari XEGS
Logo						
Manufacturer		Sega		Nintendo	Atari Corporation	
Image(s)						
Release date		JP: July 15, 1983; AU: November 1983	JP: October 20, 1985; NA: October 1986; WW: June 1987; BR: September 4, 1989	JP: July 15, 1983; NA: October 18, 1985; BR: 1985; EU: September 1986; WW: 1987	NA: May 1986; WW: July 1987	NA: 1987
Launch prices	US$	—N/a	US$199.99 (equivalent to $590 in 2025)	US$180 (equivalent to US$540 in 2025)	US$140 (equivalent to $410 in 2025)	US$159 (equivalent to $470 in 2025)
Launch prices	GBP	—N/a	£99.95 (equivalent to £290 in 2025)	—N/a	—N/a	—N/a
Launch prices	JP¥	JP¥15,000 (equivalent to ¥20,300 in 2024)	JP¥15,000 (equivalent to ¥19,400 in 2024)	JP¥14,800 (equivalent to ¥20,000 in 2024)	—N/a	—N/a
Media	Type	Cartridge; Cassette (with keyboard attachment); Data card (Card Catcher required)	Cartridge; Data card (first model only)	Cartridge; 3″ floppy disk (Famicom Disk System required, Japan and Hong Kong)	Cartridge	Cartridge
Media	Regional lockout	Unrestricted	Region locked	Region locked	Region locked	None
Media	Backward compatibility	—N/a	SG-1000 (Japanese systems only)	—N/a	Atari 2600	Atari 8-bit computers
Pack-in game		N/A	Hang-On and Safari Hunt (built-in); Alex Kidd in Miracle World; Sonic the Hedgehog	Super Mario Bros. (approx. 40 million units)	Pole Position II	Missile Command (built-in)
Top-selling games		N/A	N/A	Super Mario Bros. 3, 18 million (as of May 21, 2003); Super Mario Bros. 2 (approx. 10 million units)	N/A	N/A
Accessories (retail)		Bike Handle Controller; Card Catcher; Sega Handle Controller; Sega Rapid Fire Unit; SK-1100	Light Phaser; SegaScope 3D Glasses; Sega Control Stick; Sega Handle Controller; Sega Paddle Control; Sega Pro Action Replay; Sega Remote Control System; Sega Rapid Fire Unit; Sega SG Commander; Sega Sports Pad	Famicom Disk System (Japan and Hong Kong); NES Advantage; NES Four Score; NES Max; NES Satellite; NES Zapper; NES Power Pad; NES R.O.B.; Famicom 3D System (Japan only); More...	Atari XG-1 Light Gun	XEGS keyboard; CX40 joystick; Atari XG-1 Light Gun
CPU clock speed		NEC μPD780C (Z80-derived) (3.58 MHz (3.55 MHz PAL)	Zilog Z80A (3.58 MHz NTSC, 3.55 MHz PAL)	Ricoh 2A03 (6502-derived) (1.79 MHz (1.66 MHz PAL))	Custom 6502C (1.19 MHz or 1.79 MHz)	
GPU		Texas Instruments TMS9918; Yamaha YM2217 VDP (Video Display Processor) (later models)	Yamaha YM2602 VDP (Video Display Processor)	Ricoh PPU (Picture Processing Unit)	Atari MARIA; Atari TIA (Television Interface Adaptor)	ANTIC; Graphic Television Interface Adaptor
Sound chip(s)		Texas Instruments SN76489; Yamaha VDP PSG (later models)	Yamaha VDP PSG (SN76496); Japan only: Yamaha YM2413	NTSC: Ricoh 2A03; PAL: Ricoh 2A07; Famicom Disk System: Nintendo 2C33	Atari TIA; Optional cartridge chip: POKEY	POKEY
Memory		3 KB RAM: 1 KB main RAM; 2 KB video RAM	24.031 KB (24,608 bytes) RAM: 8 KB main XRAM; 16 KB video XRAM (256 bytes sprite attribute table); 32 bytes palette RAM	4.277 KB (4380 bytes) RAM: 2 KB main RAM); 2 KB video RAM; 256 bytes sprite attribute RAM; 28 bytes palette RAM; Upgrades: MMC chips: Up to 8 KB work RAM and 12 KB video RAM; Famicom Disk System: 32 KB work RAM, 8 KB video RAM	4 KB RAM: 4 KB main RAM (200 bytes line buffer)	64KB RAM
Video	Resolution	256×192	256×192, 256×224, 256×240	256×240	160×200 or 320×200	160x192
Video	Palette	21 colors	64 colors	54 colors	256 colors (16 hues, 16 luma)	256 colors
Video	Colors on screen	16 simultaneous (1 color per sprite)	32 simultaneous (16 colors per sprite)	25 simultaneous (4 colors per sprite)	25 simultaneous (1, 4 or 12 colors per sprite)	16 simultaneous (256 color palette)
Video	Sprites	32 on screen (4 per scanline); 8×8 or 16×16 pixels; Integer sprite zooming up to 32×32 pixels	64 on screen (8 per scanline); 8×8 to 16×16 pixels; Integer sprite zooming up to 32×32 pixels	64 on screen (8 per scanline); 8×8 or 8×16 pixels; Sprite flipping	Display list; 100 sprites (30 per scanline without background)	8 on screen
Video	Background	Tilemap playfield, 8×8 tiles	Tilemap playfield, 8×8 tiles, tile flipping	Tilemap playfield, 8×8 tiles	N/A	Tilemap playfield, 384×240 (overscan)
Video	Scrolling	N/A	Smooth hardware scrolling, vertical/horizontal/diagonal directions, IRQ interrupt, line scrolling, split‑screen scrolling	Smooth hardware scrolling, vertical/horizontal directions MMC chips: IRQ interrupt, diagonal scrolling, line scrolling, split‑screen scrolling	Coarse scrolling, vertical/horizontal directions	
Audio		Mono audio with: Three square wave channels/voices; One noise generator	Mono audio with: Three square wave channels; One noise generator; Japan only: Two operator FM synthesizer; Nine FM synthesis channels	Mono audio with: Two square wave channels; One triangle wave channel; One noise generator; One DPCM channel, 6-bit audio, 4.2 to 33.5 kHz sampling rate; Japan only upgrades: Optional cartridge chip; One wavetable synthesizer (Famicom Disk System)	Mono audio with: Two square waves; Optional cartridge chip: Four square wave channels; One noise generator	Mono audio with: Four square wave channels; One noise generator

=== Other consoles ===
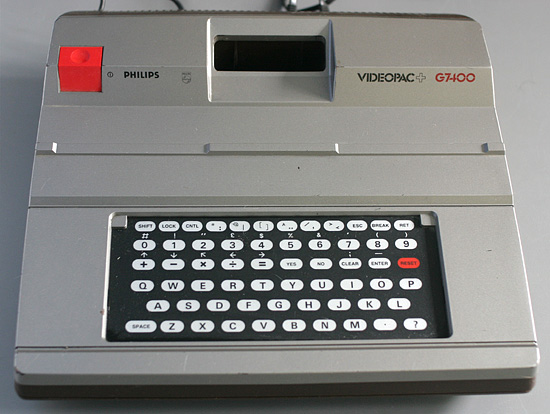
Videopac+ G7400 (1983)

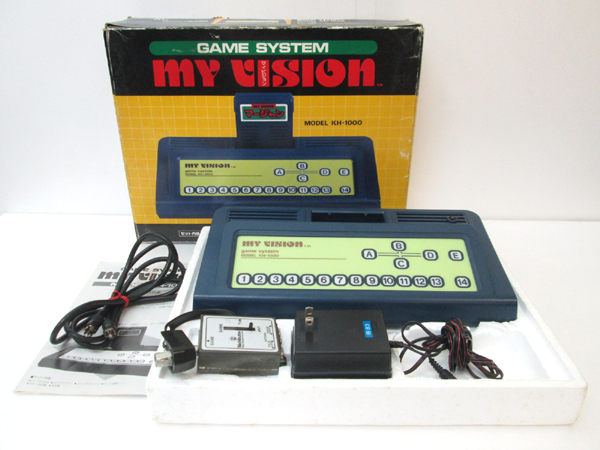
My Vision (1983)

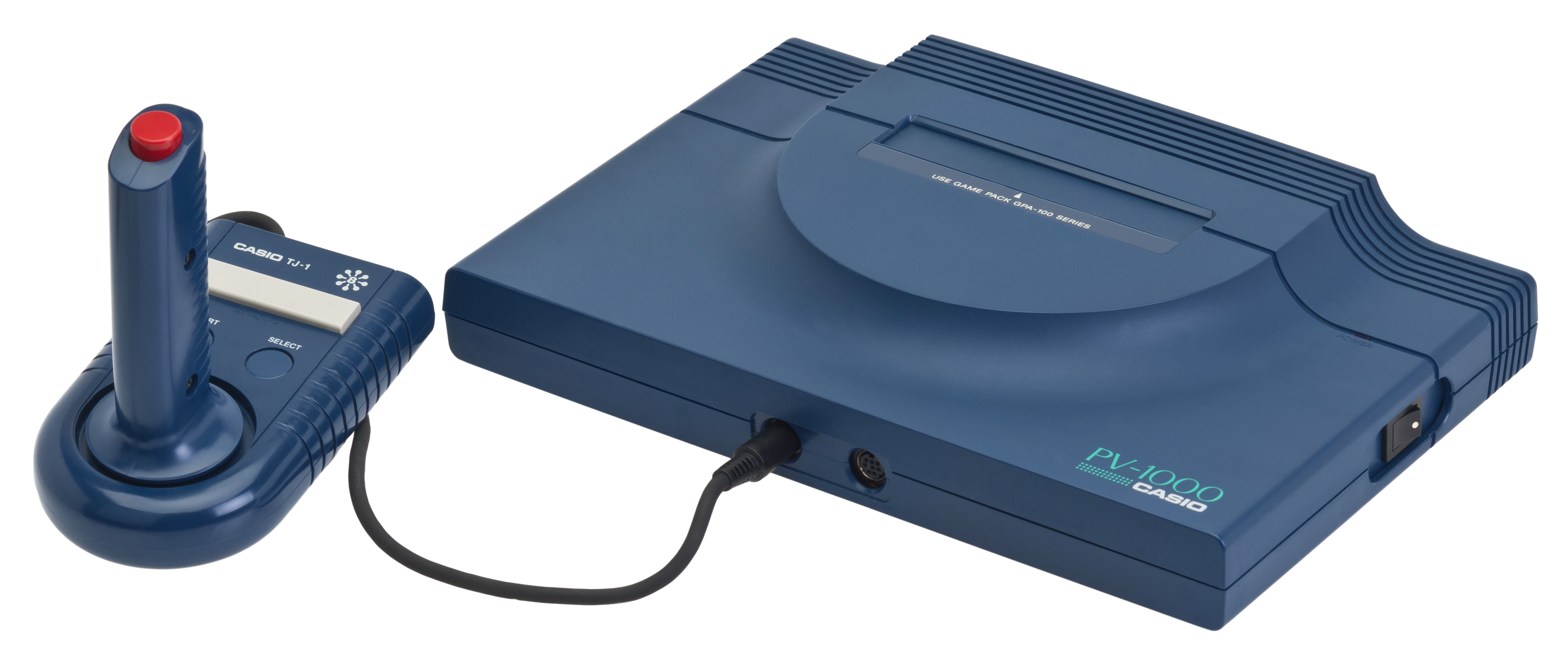
PV-1000 (1983)

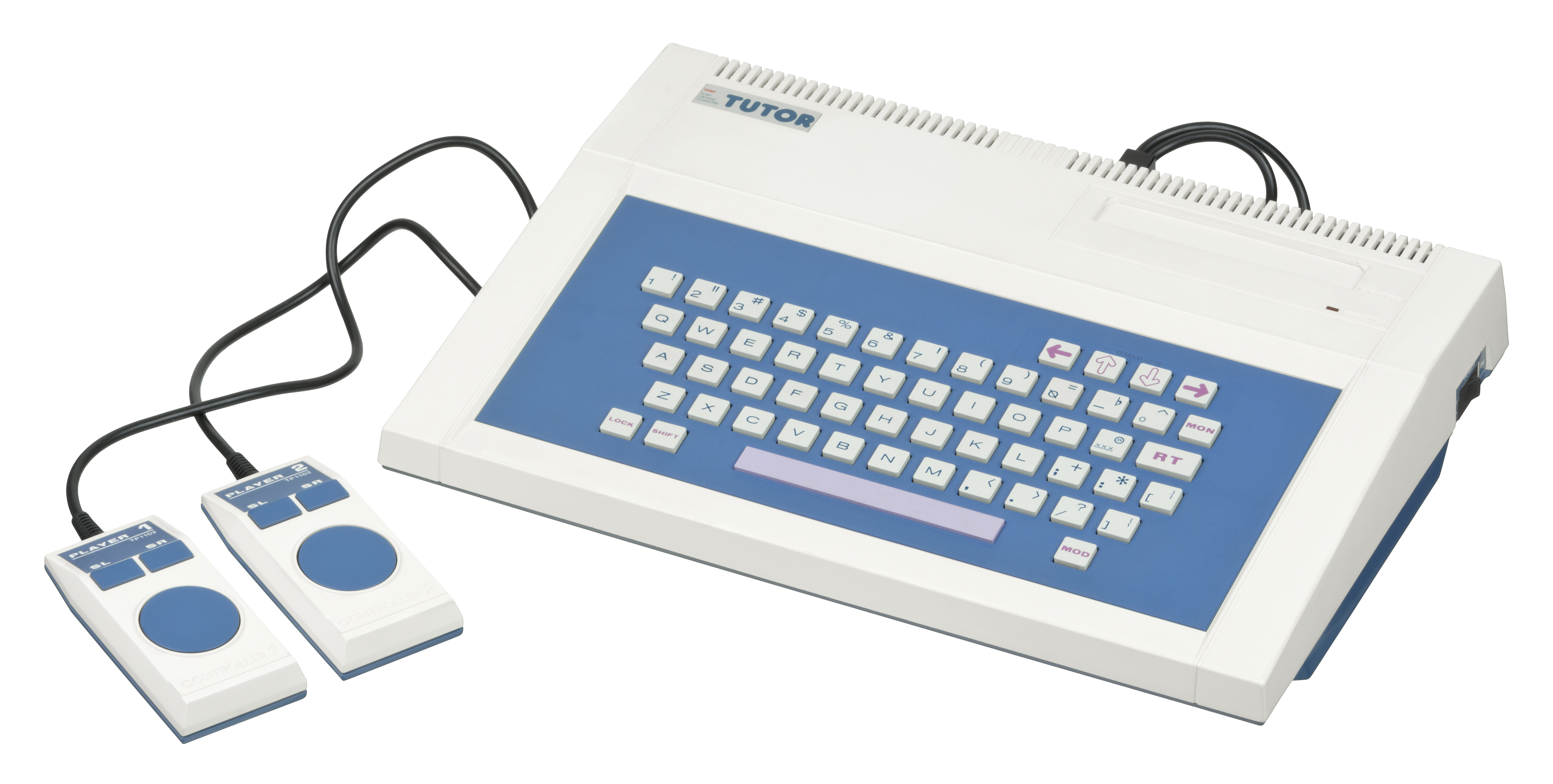
Tomy Tutor
Pyūta Jr. was a console version released in 1983

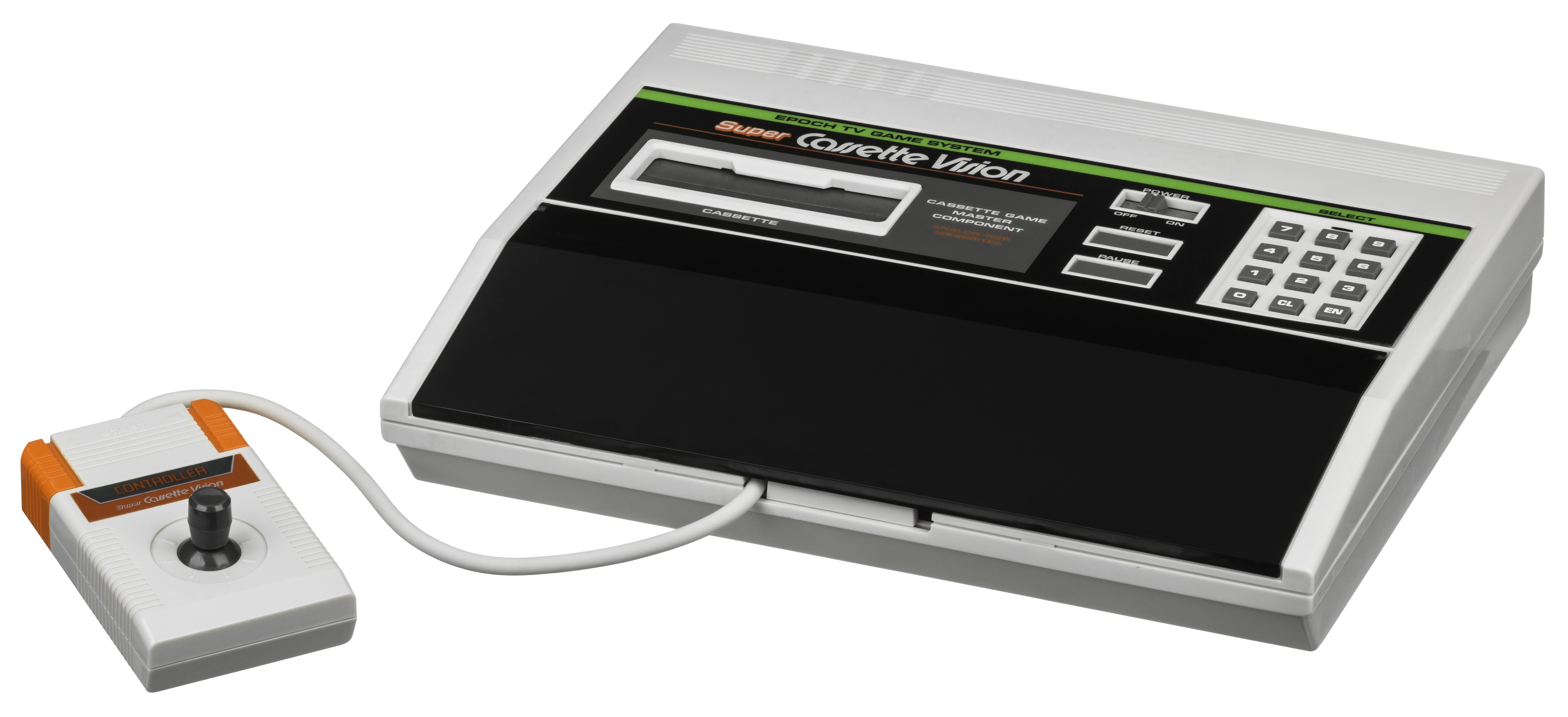
Super Cassette Vision (1984)

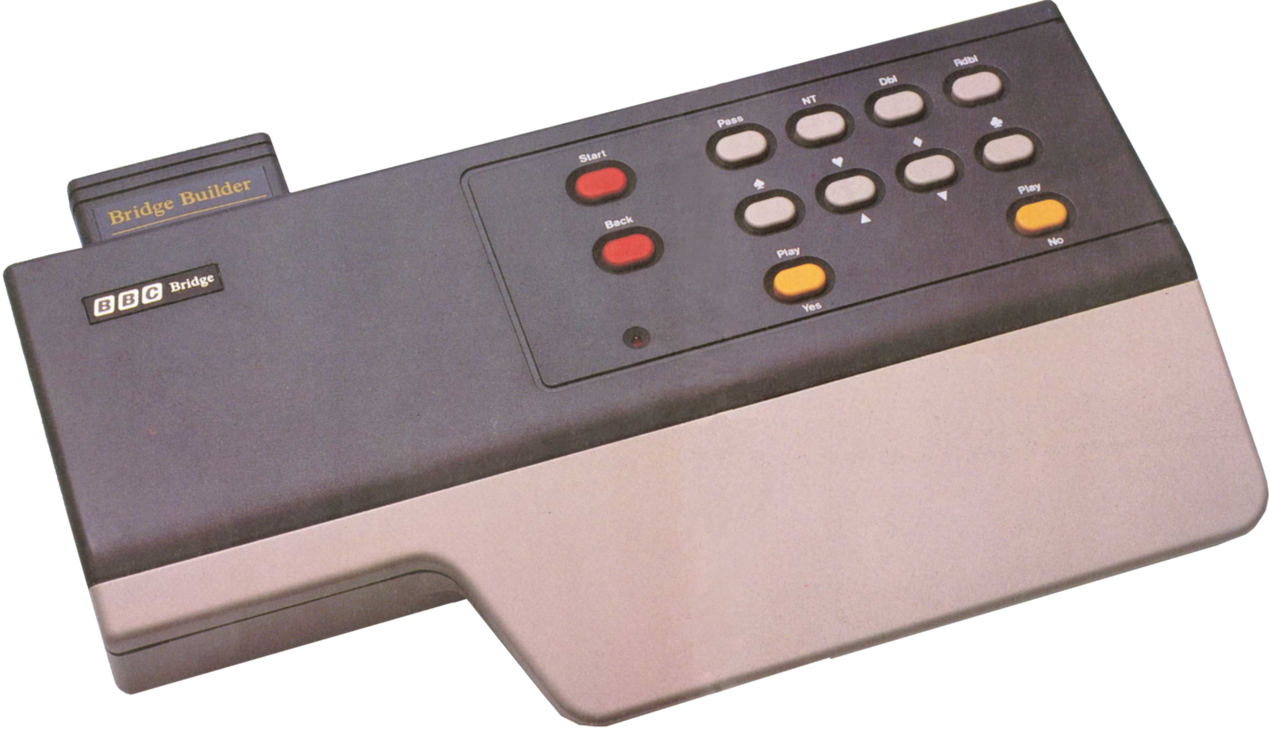
BBC Bridge Companion (1985)

Video Challenger
Released in 1987

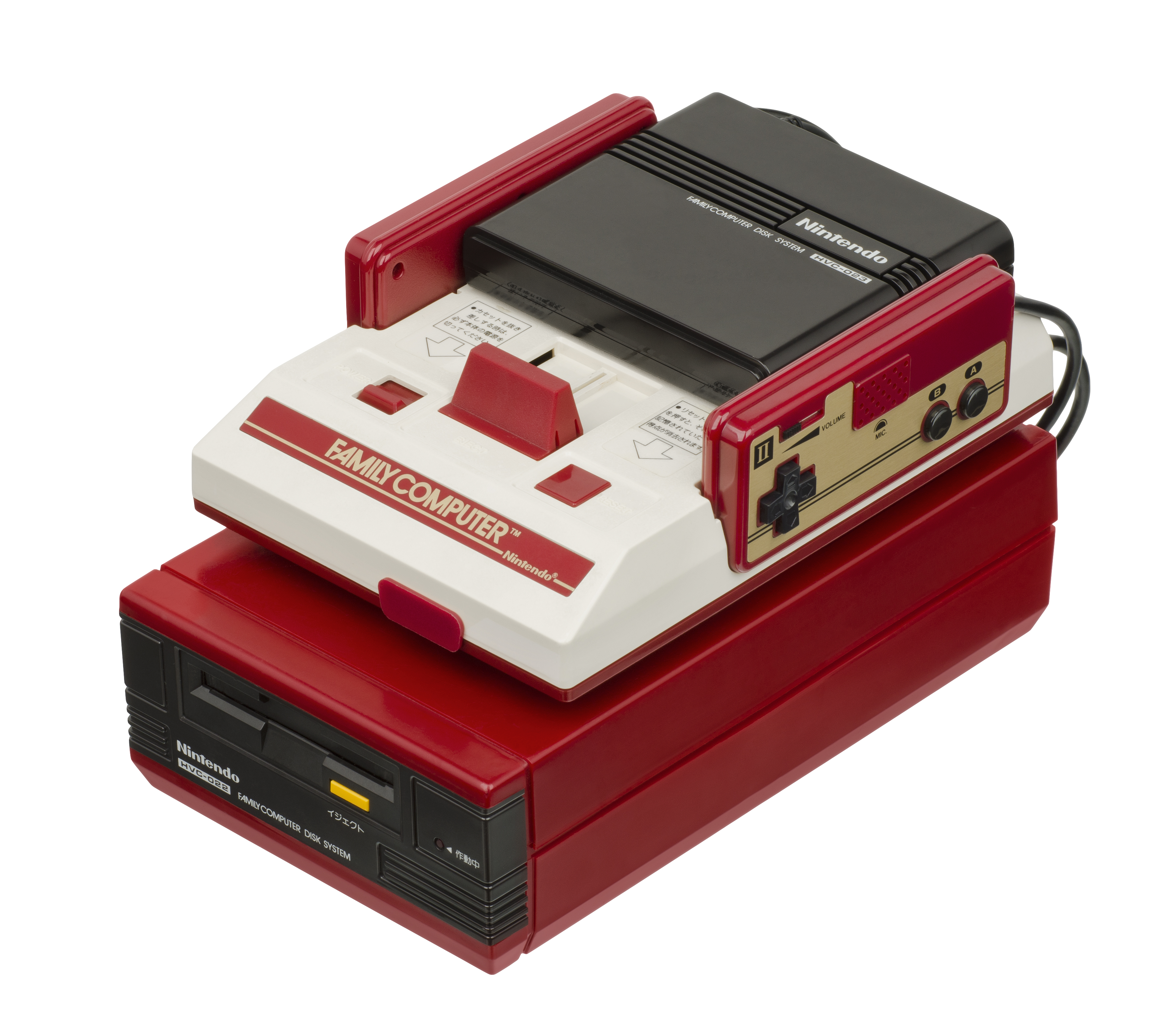
Family Computer Disk System (1986)

LJN Video Art
Released in 1987

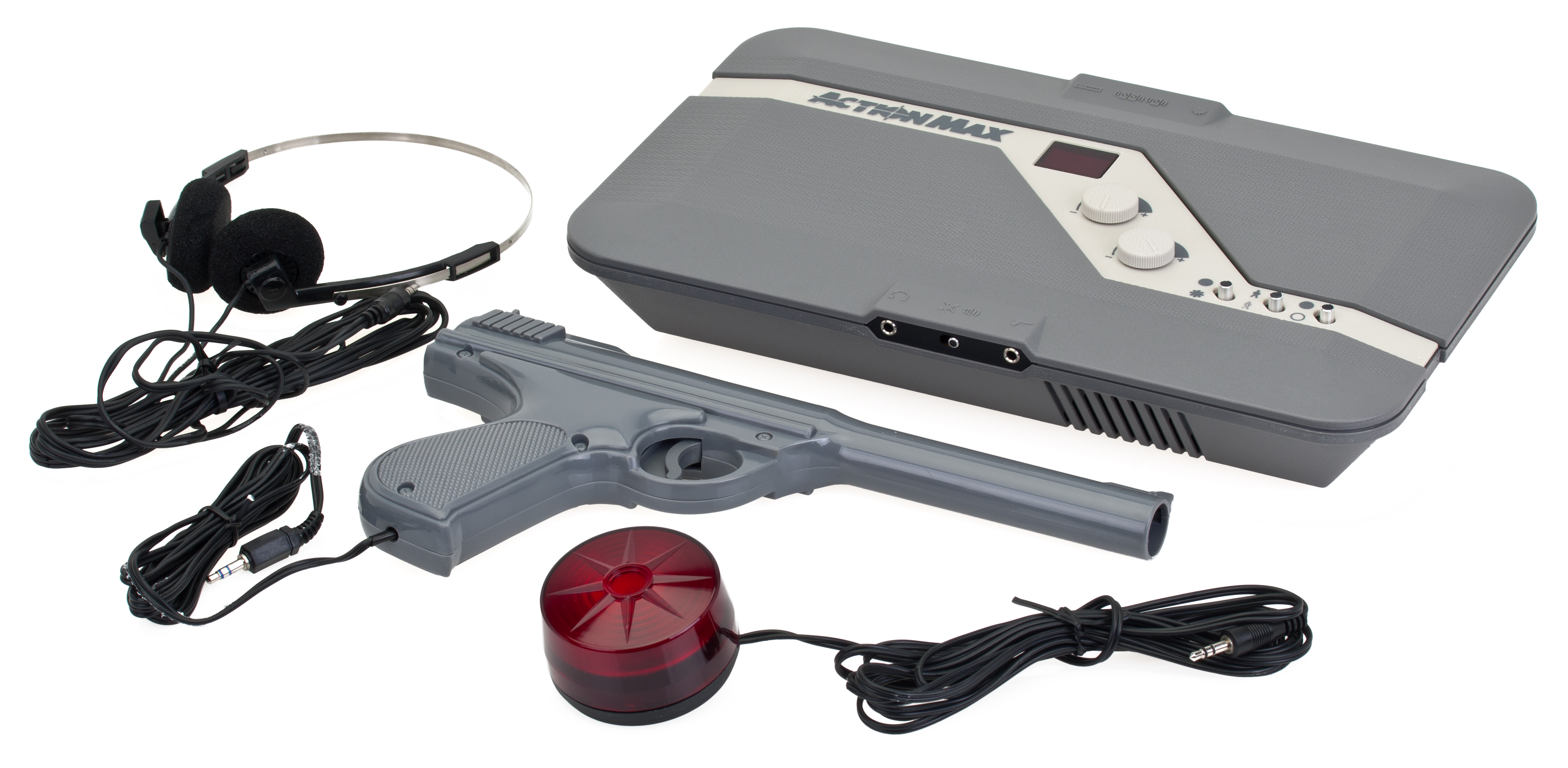
Action Max (1987)

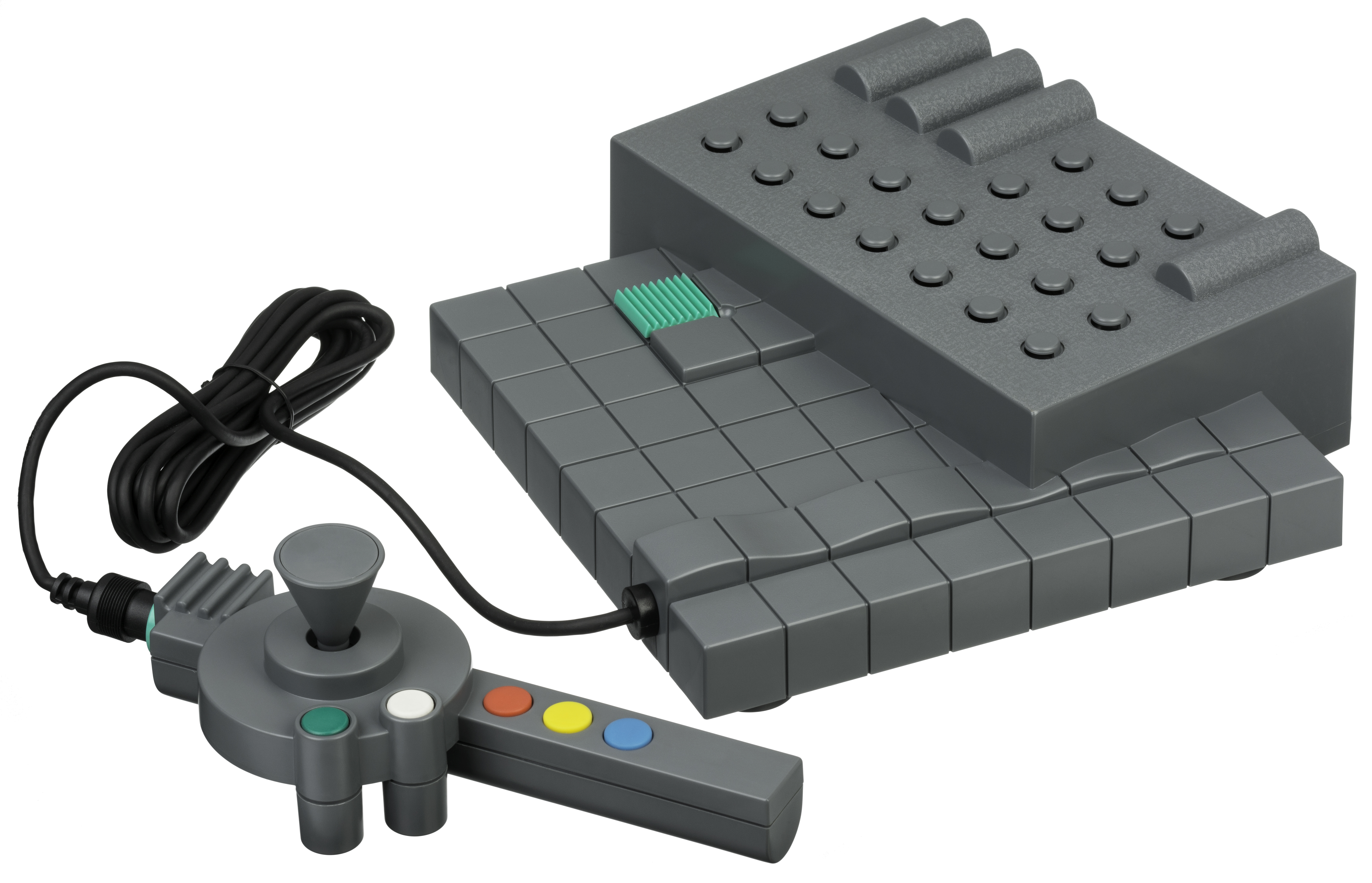
View-Master Interactive Vision (1989)

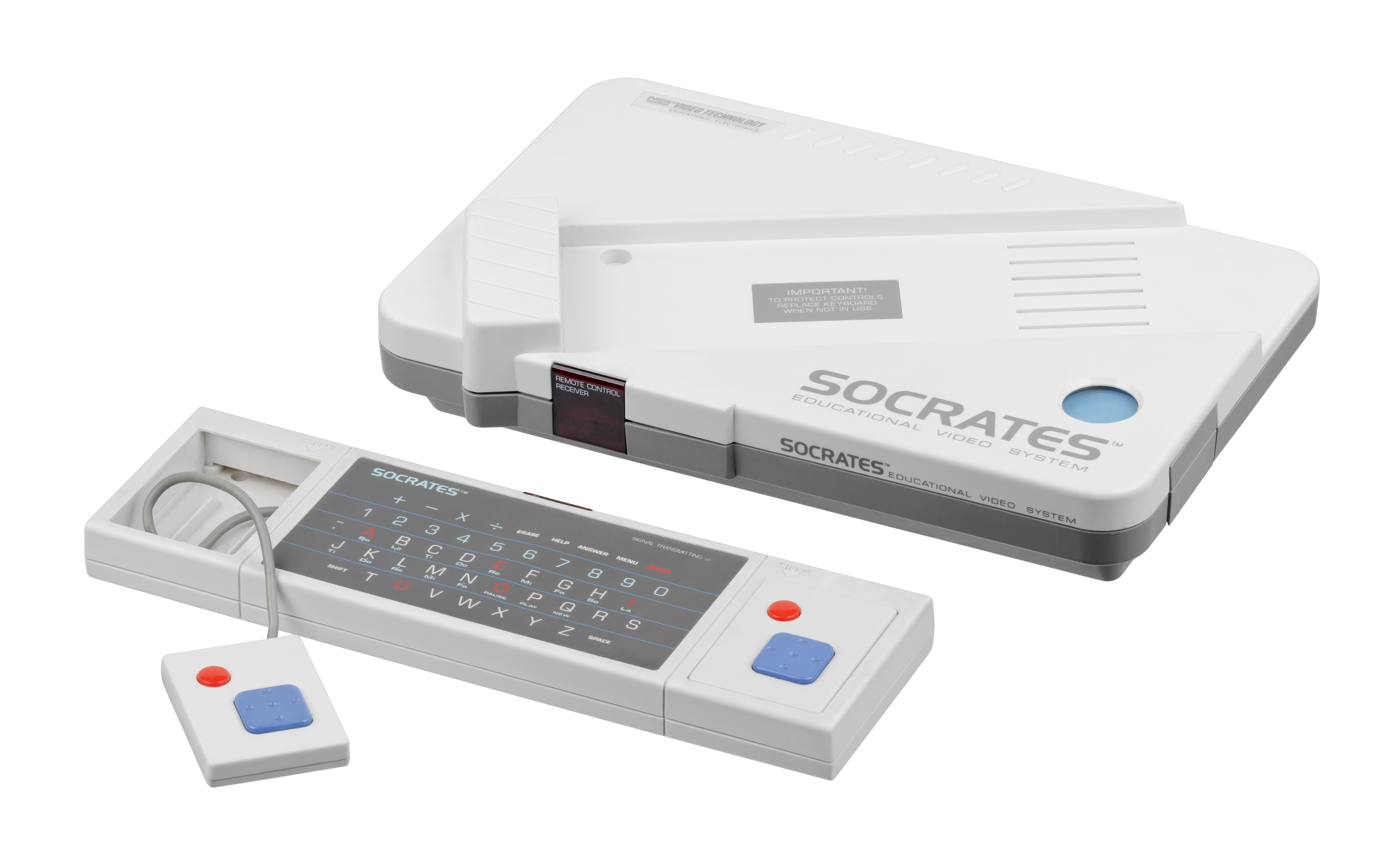
VTech Socrates (1988)

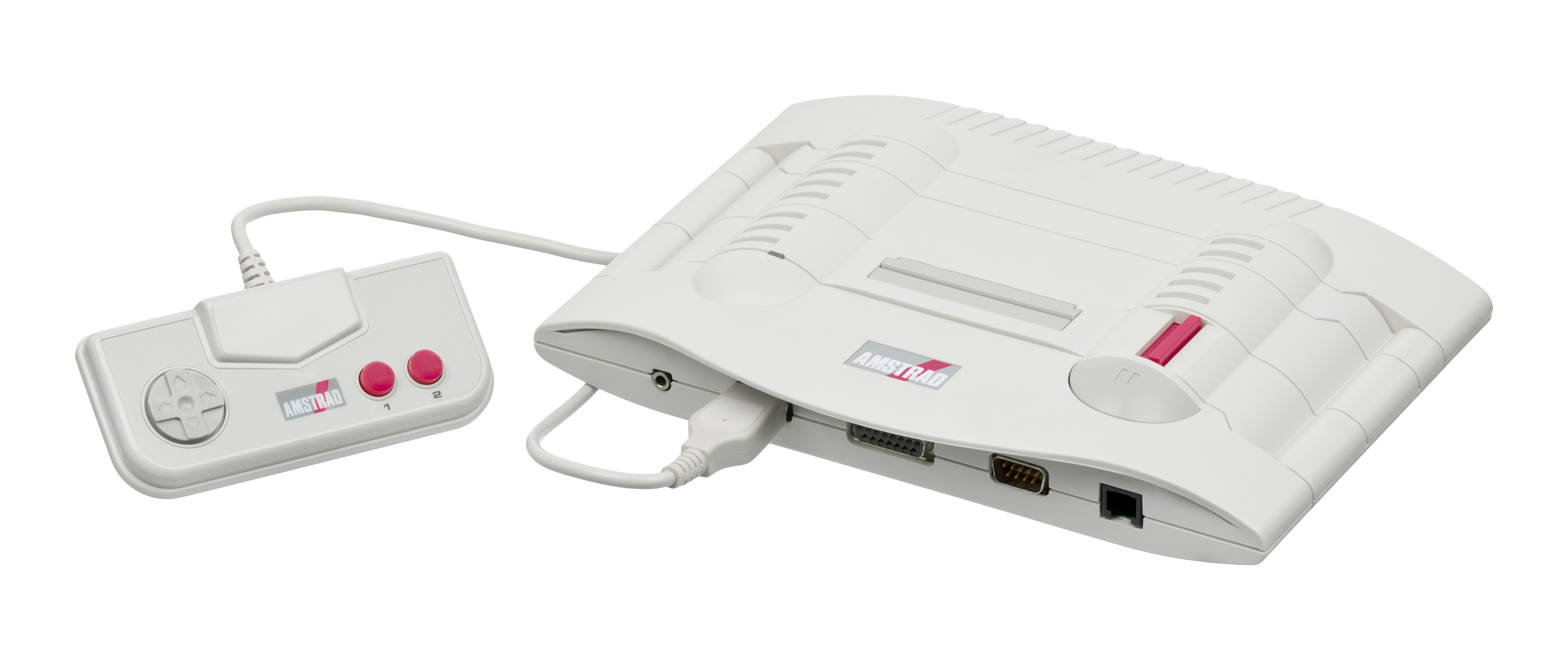
GX4000 (1990)

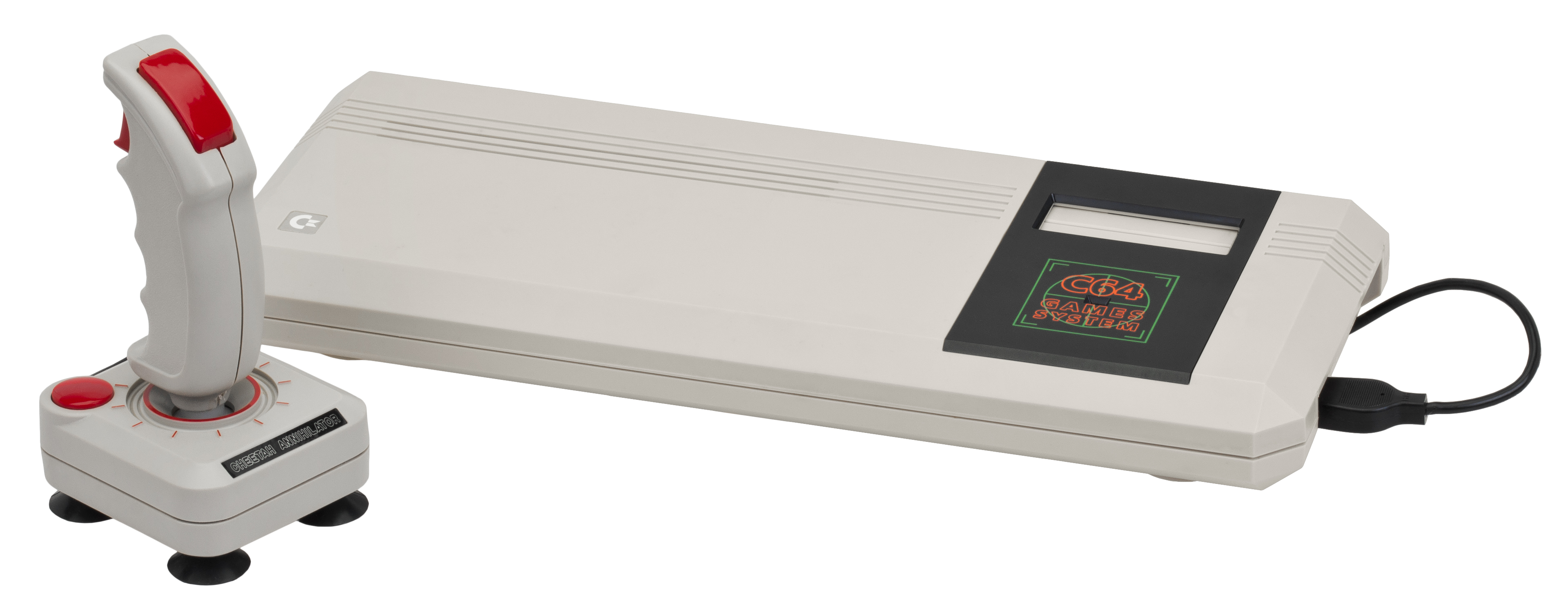
Commodore 64 Games System (1990)

==== Revisions ====
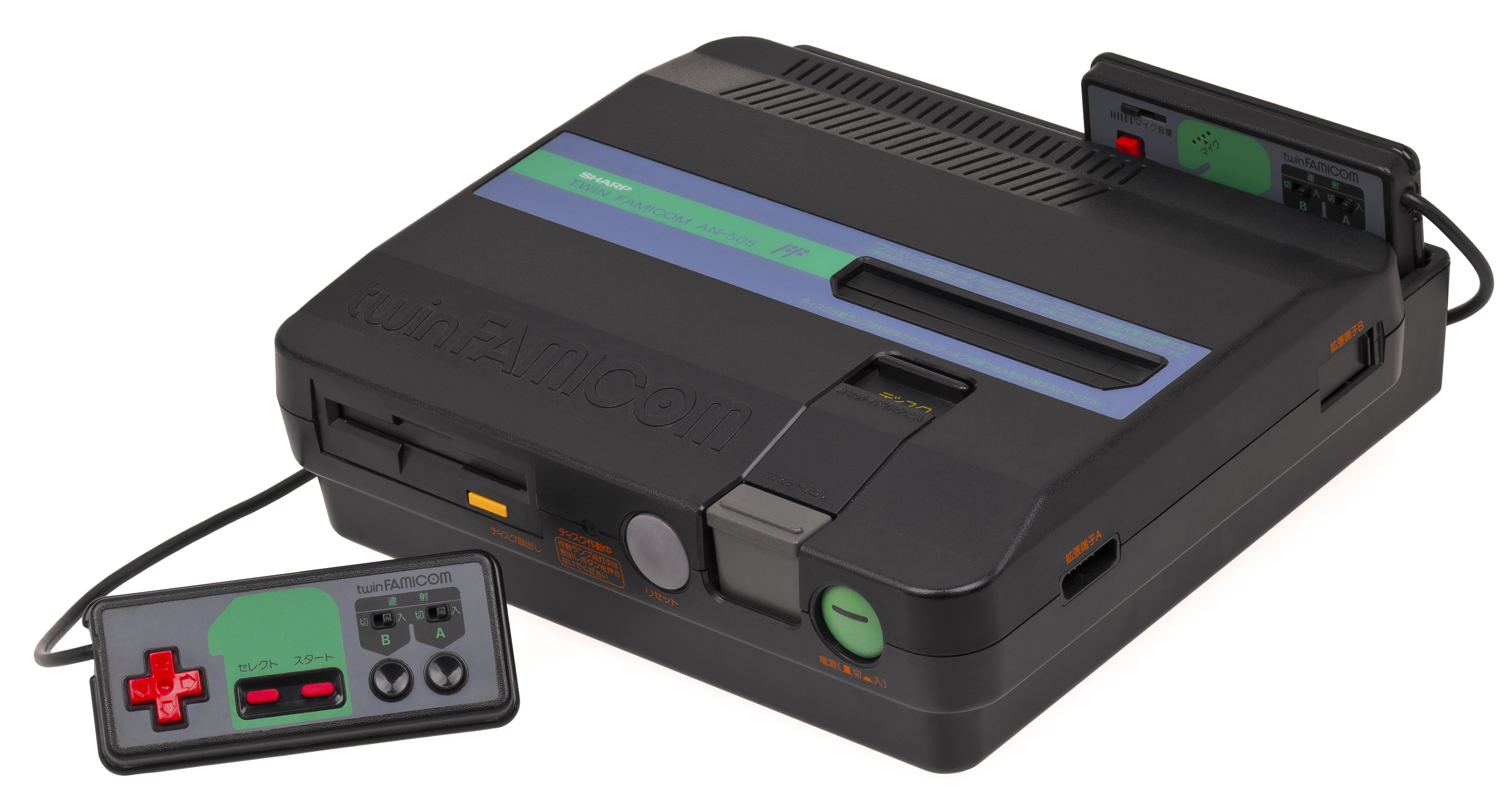
Twin Famicom
Manufactured by Sharp Corporation. Exclusively released in Japan on July 1, 1986

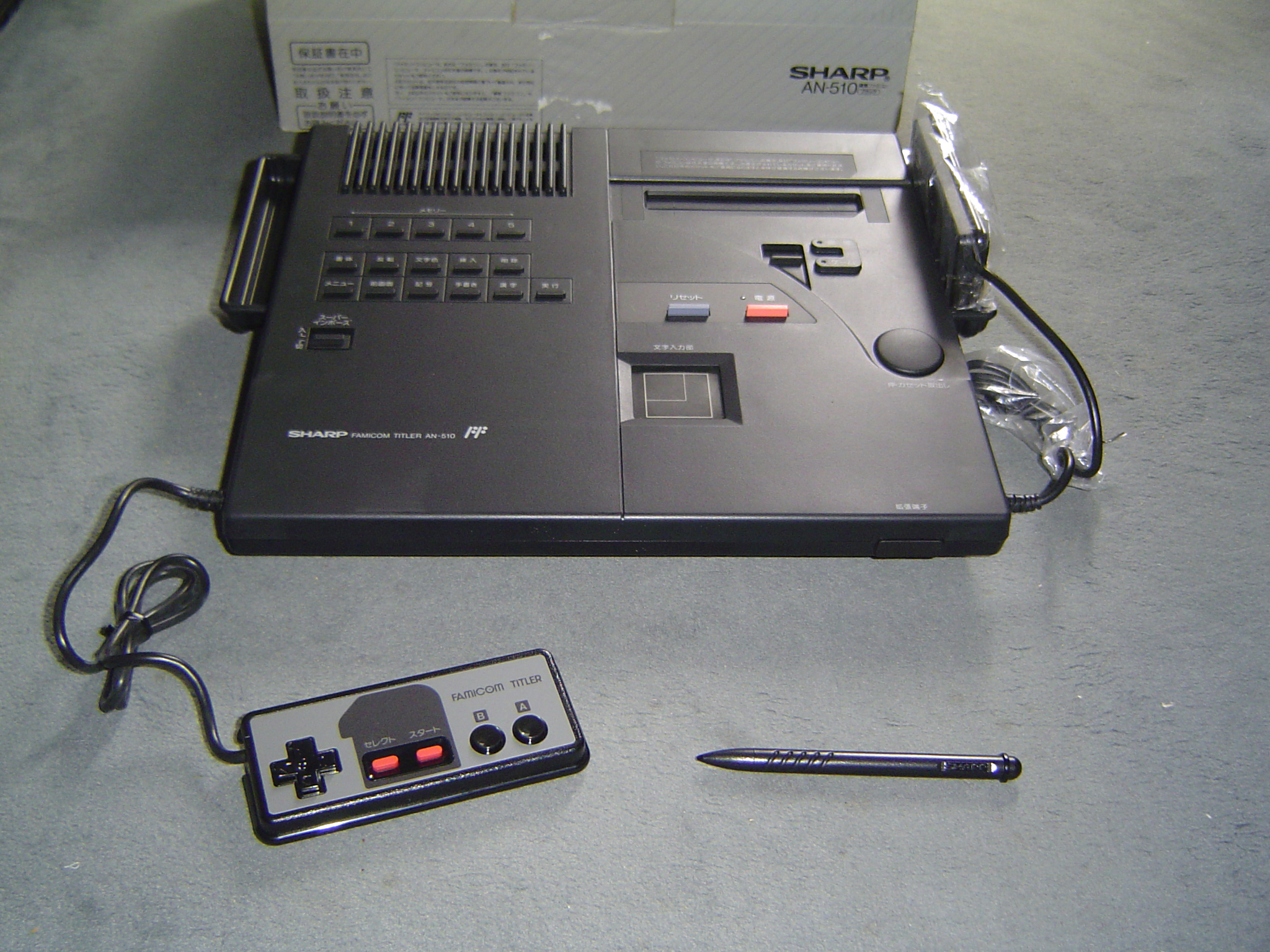
Famicom Titler (1989)

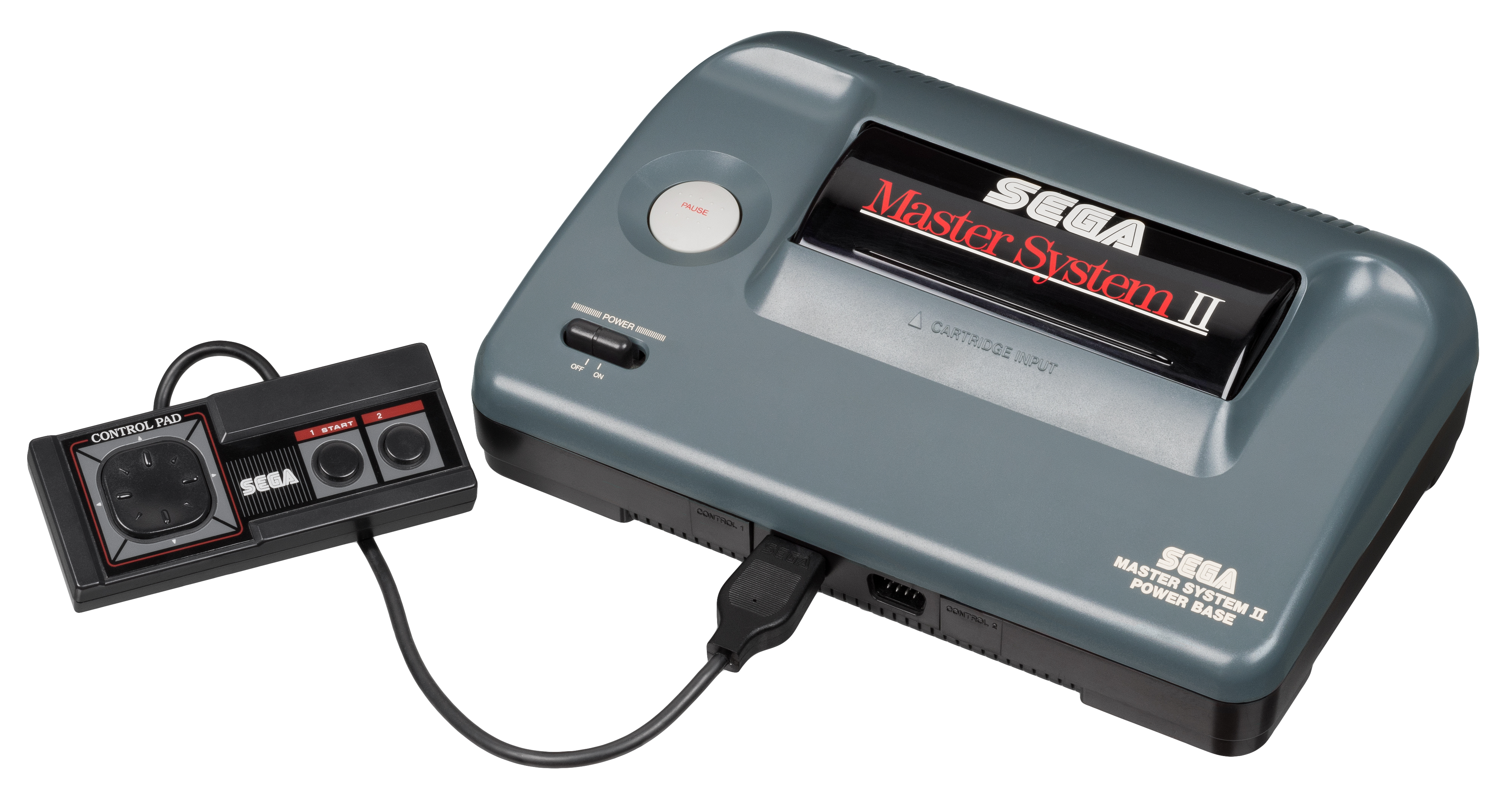
Master System II
Cost-reduced variant released in 1990

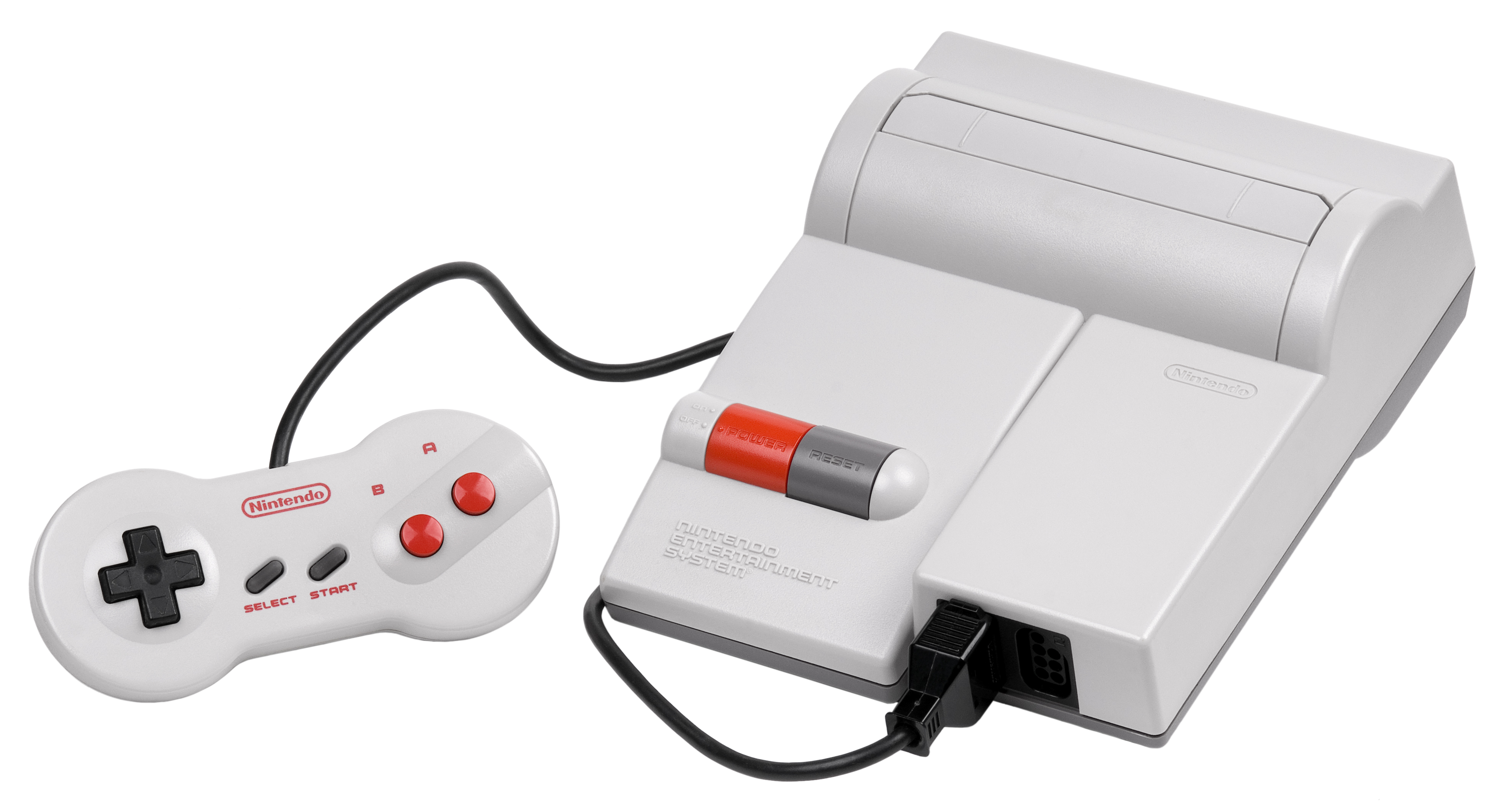
New-Style NES (1993)

==== Clones ====
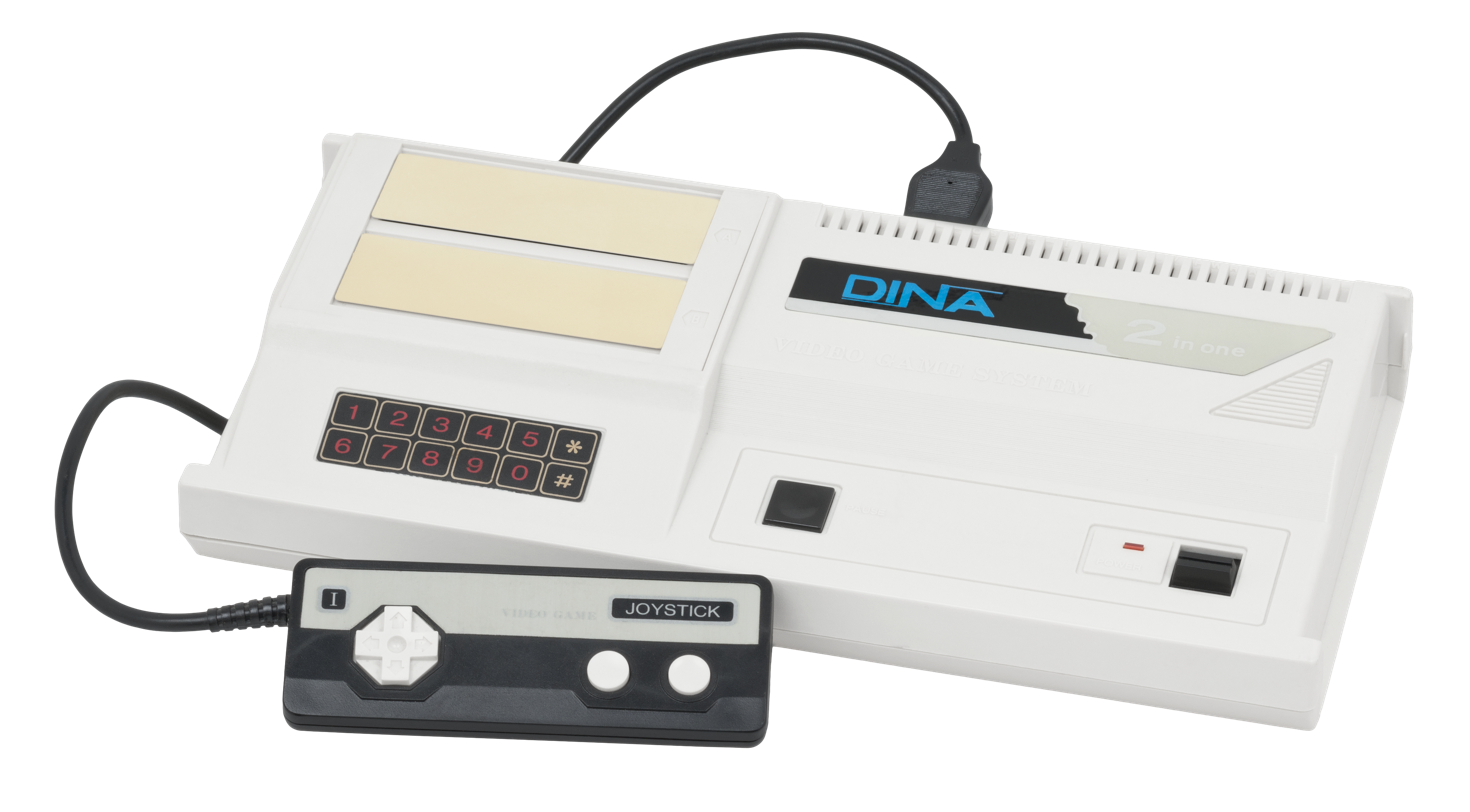
Dina (Telegames Personal Arcade)
ColecoVision and SG-1000 combination released in 1986

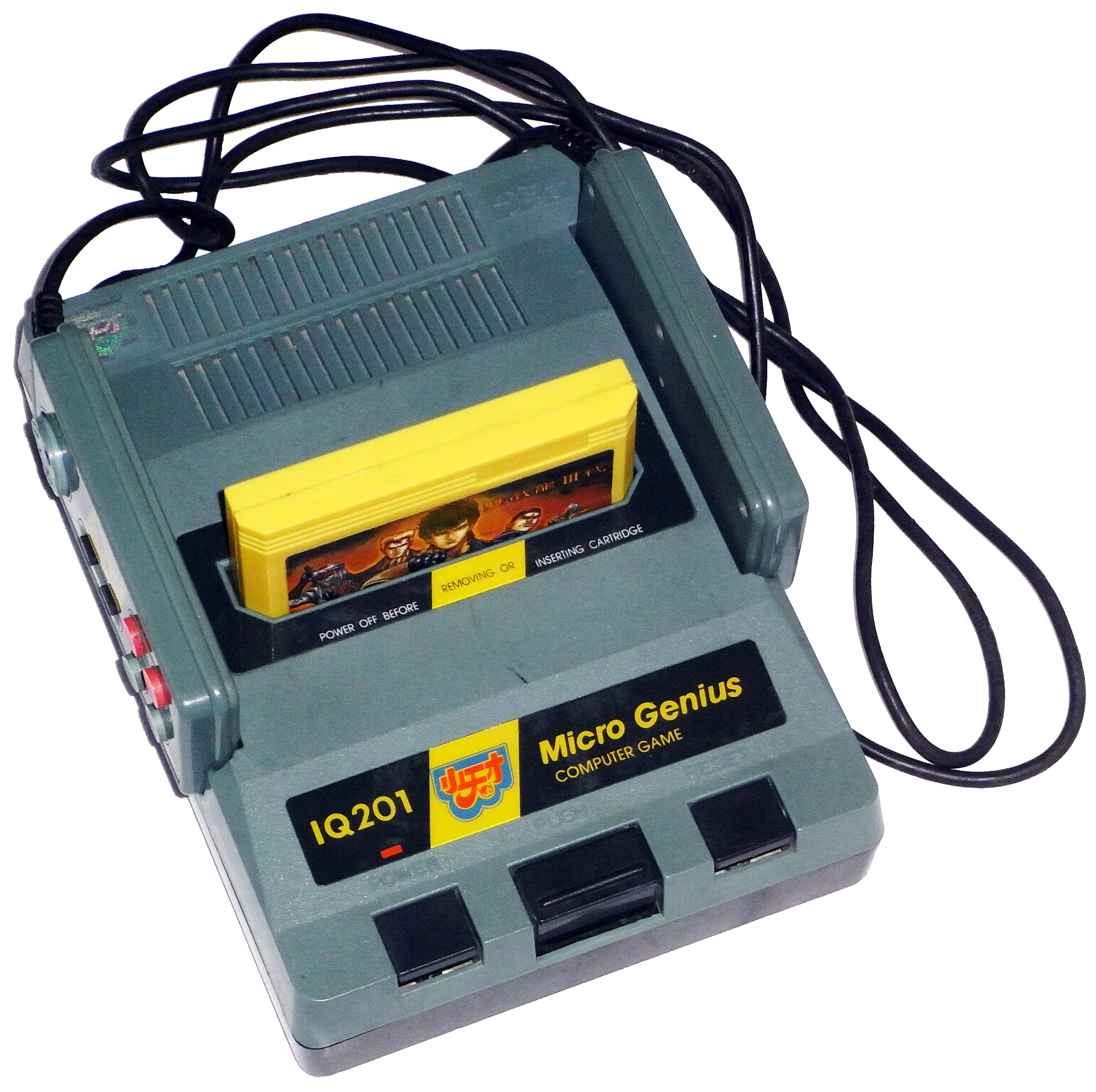
Micro Genius IQ-201

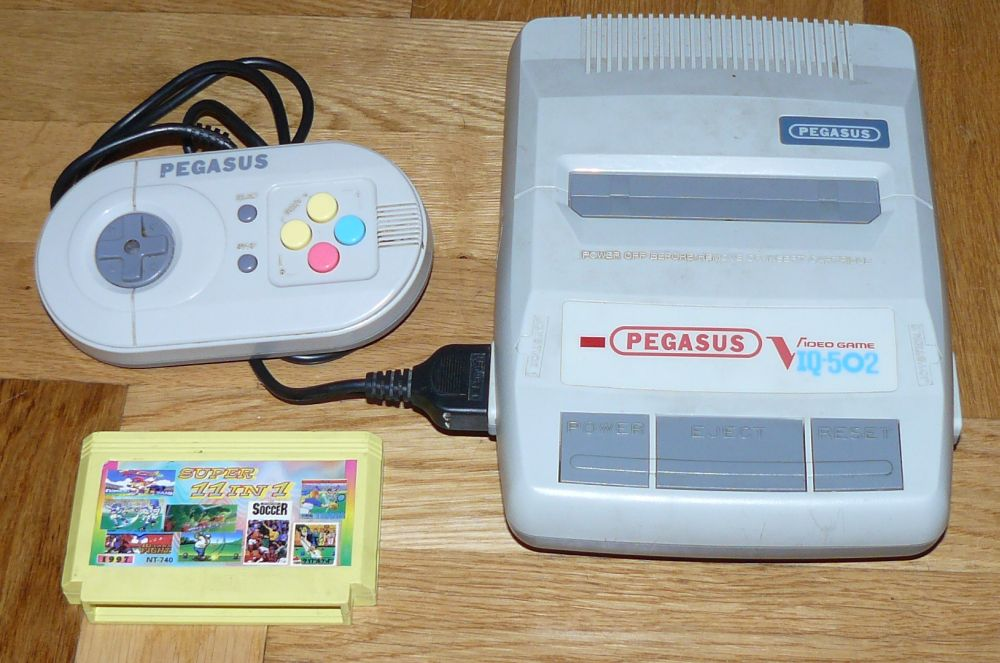
Pegasus (1991)

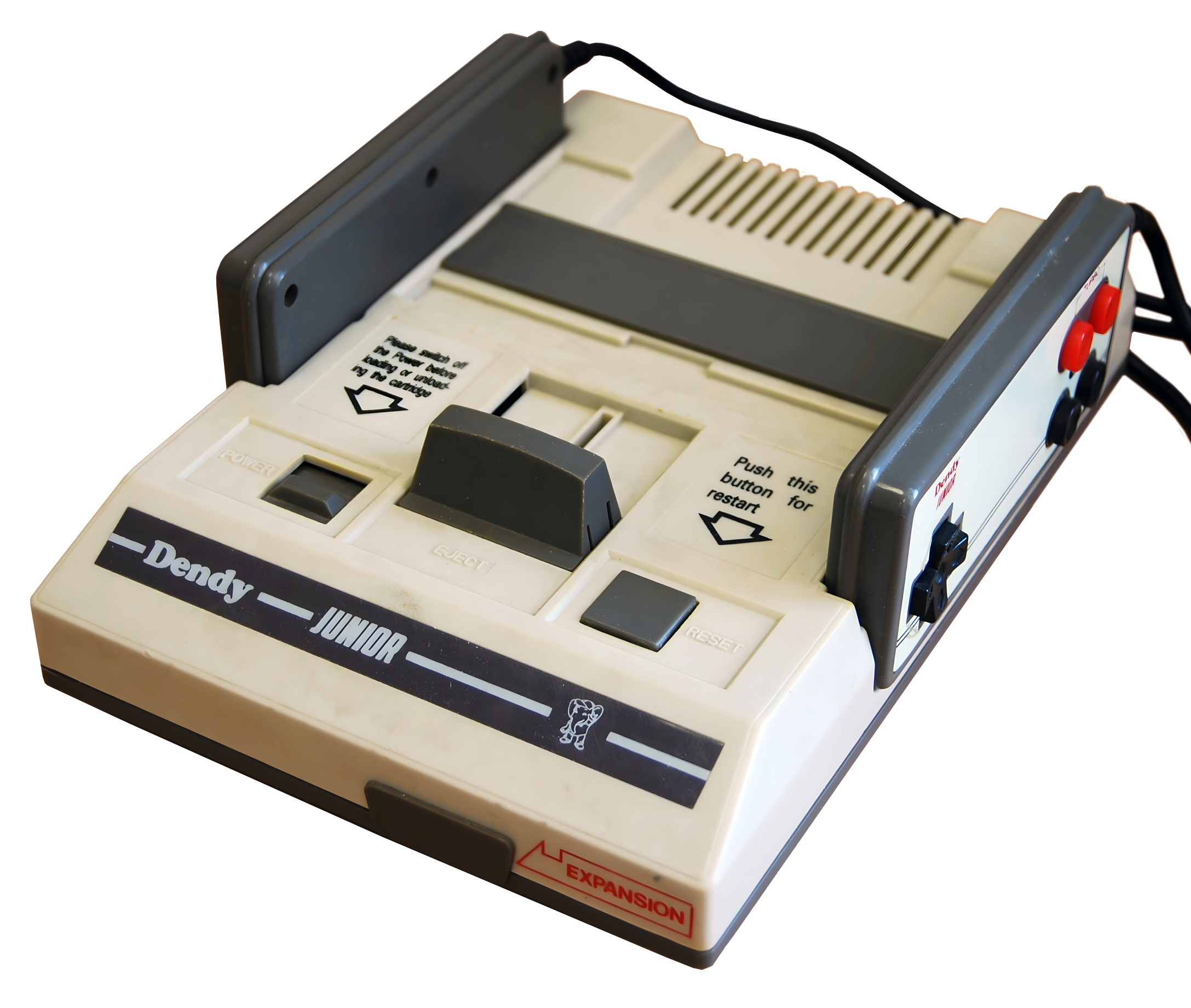
Dendy (1992)

==== Unreleased ====
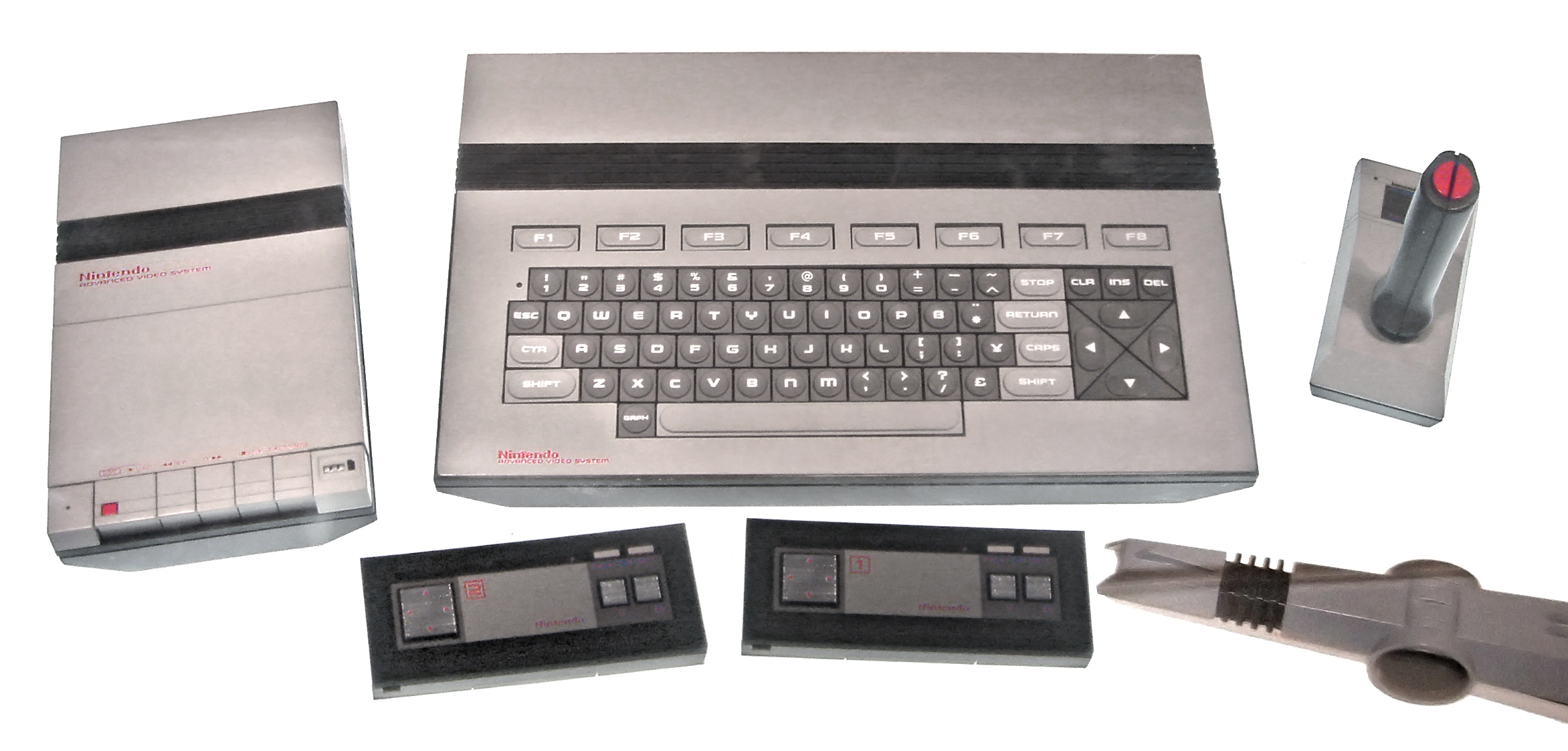
Nintendo Advanced Video System
The original model for the NES planned to release worldwide (1983)

=== Sales comparison ===
The NES/Famicom sold by far the most units of any third generation console, particularly in Japan and North America. In North America in 1989, between Nintendo and Sega, there was a 94% to 6% split in market share between the NES and the Master System, in Nintendo's favor. The NES sold 1.1 million units in North America during 1986, much more than the Master System (125,000) and Atari 7800 (100,000) combined. By 1990, Nintendo had a 93% North American market share, followed by Sega with a 3.8% share, NEC with 1.3% and Atari with 1.1% share. Nintendo maintained its North American lead through 1991, when it had a market-share of 80% that year, much more than Atari (12%) and Sega (8%) combined. This was due to Nintendo's strong lineup of both first-party titles (such as Super Mario Bros., Metroid, Duck Hunt, and The Legend of Zelda) and third-party titles along with Nintendo's strict licensing rules that required NES titles to be exclusive to the console for two years after release, putting a damper on third-party support for other consoles.

In Europe, competition was much tougher for the NES, which was trailing behind the Master System up until 1990, despite the former's hegemony of the North American and Japanese markets. NES sales began picking up from about 1990, after which sales were more evenly split between the NES and Master System through 1994; the NES eventually overtook the Master System in Western Europe by a narrow margin, though the Master System maintained its lead in several markets such as the United Kingdom, Belgium and Spain. In other regions, the Master System was the most successful console in Brazil, South Korea, and Australia, while the Dendy (a Taiwanese Famiclone of the NES/Famicom) was the most successful in the former Soviet Union.

Console	Firm	Units sold worldwide	Japan	Americas	Other regions
Nintendo Entertainment System (Family Computer / Famicom / NES)	Nintendo	61.91 million (2009)	19.35 million (2009)	34 million (2009)	8.56 million (2009)
Master System (including licensed Tectoy variants)	Sega	19.17 million (2016)	1 million (1986)	United States: 2 million (1992); Brazil: 8 million (2016)	Western Europe: 6.8 million (1993); South Korea: 720,000 (1994); Australia: 650,000 (1994)
Dendy (unlicenced Famiclone)	Micro Genius	6 million (1998)	—N/a	—N/a	Former USSR: 6 million (1998)
Famicom Disk System	Nintendo	4.5 million (1992)	4.4 million (1990)	—N/a	Hong Kong: 10,000 (1992)
Atari 7800	Atari	1 million (1988)	Unknown	1 million (1988)	Unknown
Sega SG-1000	Sega	400,000 (2007)	400,000 (2007)	—N/a	Unknown
Super Cassette Vision	Epoch Co.	300,000 (2007)	300,000 (2007)	—N/a	Unknown
Atari XEGS	Atari	130,000 (1989)	—N/a	100,000 (1987)	France: 30,000 (1989)

== Software ==
=== Milestone titles ===
- Alex Kidd in Miracle World (SMS) by Sega featured Sega's original mascot, Alex Kidd.
- Bomberman (MSX) by Hudson Soft started the Bomberman series. It was first released for the MSX computer and remade on the NES two years later.
- Castlevania (NES) by Konami is loosely based on Bram Stoker's Dracula, featuring Count Dracula as the main antagonist of the series. This game initiated the Castlevania series.
- Dragon Ball: Dragon Daihikyō (SCV) by Epoch was the first game based upon the now long-running manga and anime series, Dragon Ball.
- Dragon Quest (NES) by Chunsoft and Enix introduced the Dragon Quest series in 1986.
- Final Fantasy (NES) by Square started the Final Fantasy series in 1987.
- The Legend of Zelda (NES) by Nintendo R&D4 and Nintendo initiated the Legend of Zelda series in 1986.
- Mega Man 2 (NES) by Capcom was the breakthrough title in Capcom's Mega Man series. The series had a number of additional hits on the NES, and later spawned several successful spin-off series.
- Metal Gear (MSX2) by Konami initiated the Metal Gear series in 1987. It was released for the MSX2 computer and remade on the NES shortly after.
- Metroid (NES) by R&D1 and Nintendo initiated the Metroid series in 1986.
- Ninja Gaiden (NES) by Tecmo initiated the Ninja Gaiden series in 1988, and was acclaimed for its extreme difficulty, high quality music, and for having one of the earliest uses of cutscenes in video games.
- Phantasy Star (SMS) by Sega Consumer Development Division 2 and Sega is considered one of the benchmark role-playing video games, and is among the first to use a science fiction setting, and to feature a female protagonist.
- Super Mario Bros. (NES) by Nintendo R&D4 and Nintendo was bundled with the NES and became the best-selling video game of all time, a title it held until 2009. Countless imitations of the game appeared over the course of the console generation.
- Super Mario Bros. 3 (NES) by Nintendo is widely considered the best sidescrolling platform game of the generation, as well as topping many "Best Game" lists for the NES. Its jumping physics and world map segments, where players can choose their path, served as a formula for later 2D Mario games.

== See also ==
- 1980s in video games

== Bibliography ==
- Herman, Leonard (2007). P. J. Wolf, Mark (ed.). A New Generation Of Home Video Game Systems. Bloomsbury Academic. ISBN 9780313338687.
