= Incidents (magazine) =

Incidents was a magazine that was closed by the Islamic Republic of Iran for being "obscene and empty" in June 1994. It reported homicides, pre-marital and extramarital affairs, and other sex-related matters that can be punished by religious law.

The Persian words Havades or Hadeseh reportedly mean Incidents.
