= National Compensation Survey =

The National Compensation Survey (NCS) is produced by the United States Department of Labor's Bureau of Labor Statistics (BLS), measuring occupational earnings, compensation costs, benefit incidence rates, and plan provisions. It is used to adjust the federal wage schedule for all federal employees. Detailed occupational earnings are available for both metropolitan and non-metropolitan areas, broad geographic regions, and on a national basis. The NCS' Employment Cost Index measures changes in labor costs. The average costs of employee compensation per hour worked is presented in the Employer Costs for Employee Compensation (ECEC).

== Data ==
The National Compensation Survey uses data provided by companies, organizations, and government agencies that voluntarily report employee wages, benefit incidence rates, and the costs of employee compensation. All data provided to the BLS is strictly confidential and is used for statistical purposes in accordance with the Confidential Information Protection and Statistical Efficiency Act.

== Collection ==
The National Compensation Survey's data is collected by field economists within the BLS who randomly sample firms and report on the compensation of one to eight occupations within the business over time. Some respondents are also asked to report on the provisions, participation, and costs of benefits offered to employees. Occupations are benchmarked using a four-factor leveling system developed by the BLS to assist in comparing compensation data across industries, professions, and geographic boundaries.

In August 2023, the BLS announced it would stop collecting data on workers' compensation, which provides medical care and wage replacement in exchange for the employee's right to sue their employer for negligence. While this benefit is required by most states, workers' compensation only costs employers an average of $0.46 per hour of an employee's work, representing only 1% of total compensation and 3% of total benefits. The NCS data had been criticized for deviation from reporting by the National Academy of Social Insurance (NASI), potentially due to poor response rates on this section of the NCS. Additionally, the NCS surveyed corporate establishments for their total workers' compensation costs, obscuring differences by occupation.

== Publications/Statistics ==
- Employment Cost Index
- Employer Costs for Employee Compensation
- Employee Benefits in Private Industry
- Occupational Pay Relatives
