= Action Max =

1987 video game console

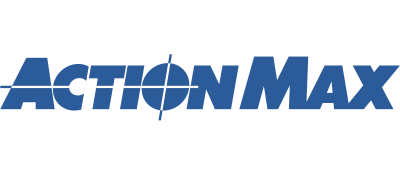

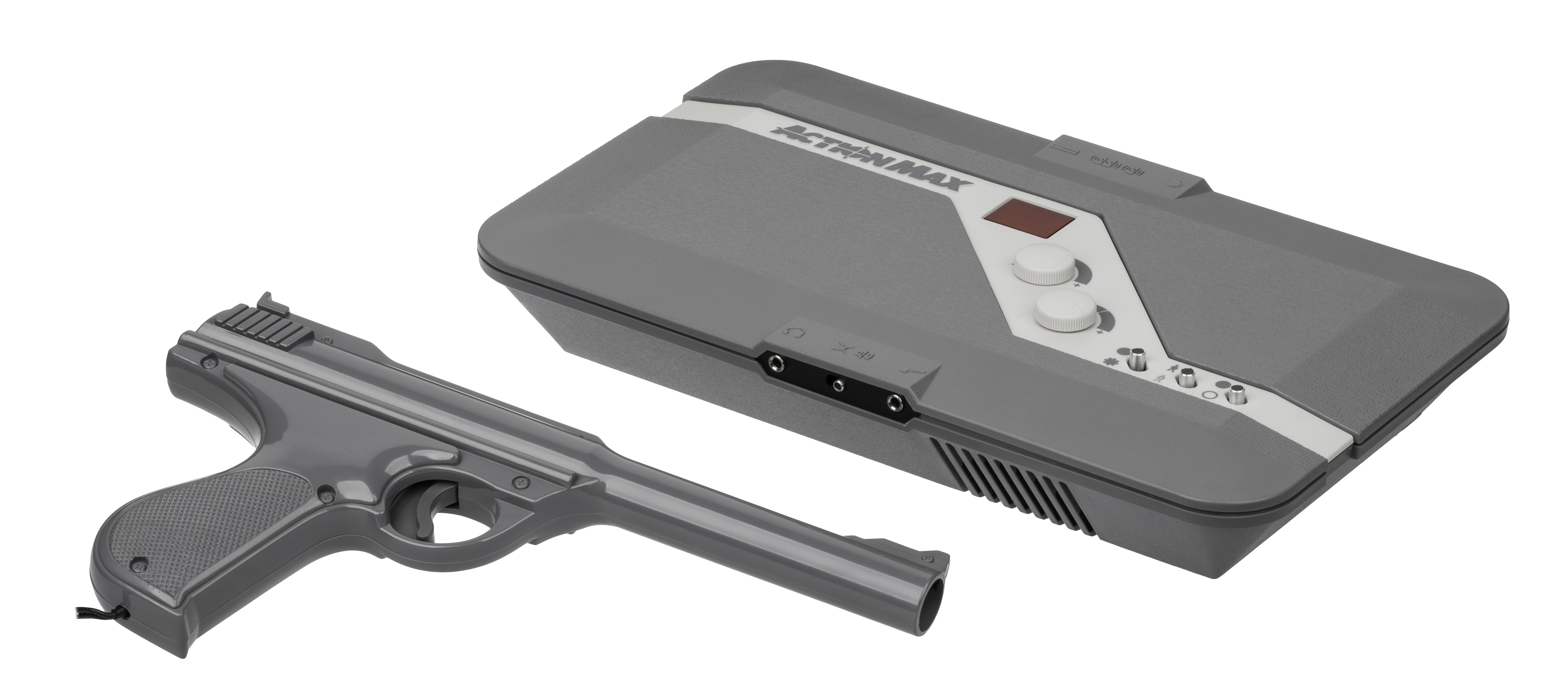
- Action Max with light gun
- Manufacturer: Worlds of Wonder
- Type: Home video game console
- Generation: Third generation
- Released: 1987
- Media: VHS tape
- CPU: HD401010
- Display: 2 character, 7 segment LED score display

The Action Max is a home video game console using VHS tapes for games. It was manufactured in 1987 by Worlds of Wonder. The system had a limited release outside the U.S.

== Gameplay ==
The Action Max system requires the player to also have a VCR, as the console has no way to play the requisite VHS tapes itself. Using light guns, players shoot at the screen. The gaming is strictly point-based and dependent on shot accuracy, and as a result, players can't truly win or lose a game. The system's post-launch appeal was limited by this and by the fact that the only real genre on the system were light gun games that played exactly the same way every time, leading to its quick market decline.

== Games ==
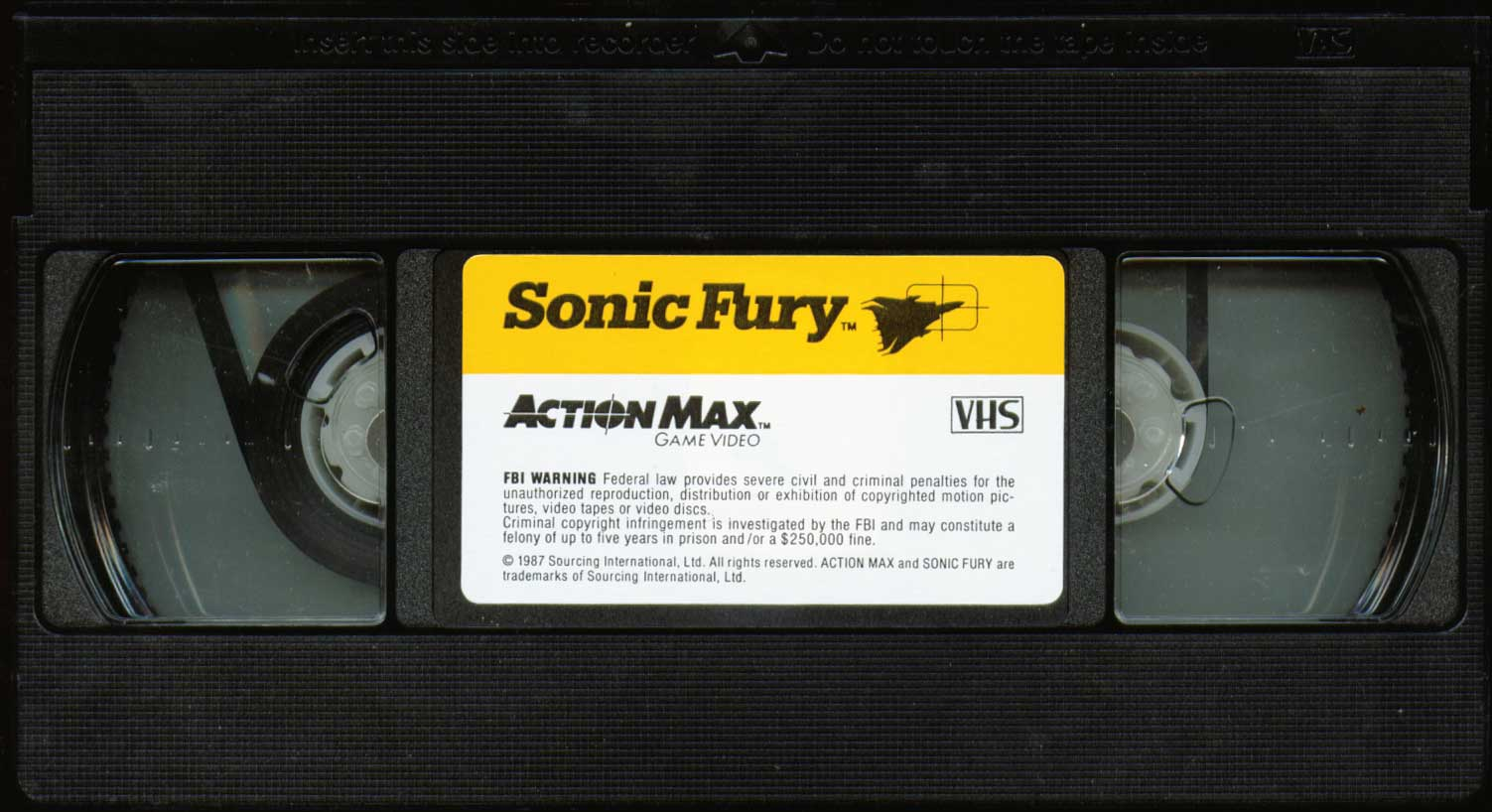
Scan of a VHS tape game for Action Max

Five VHS cassettes were released for the system:

- .38 Ambush Alley, a police target range
- Blue Thunder, based on the eponymous 1983 motion picture
- Hydrosub: 2021, a futuristic underwater voyage
- The Rescue of Pops Ghostly, a comic haunted-house adventure
- Sonic Fury, aerial combat, bundled with the system

== Technical specifications ==
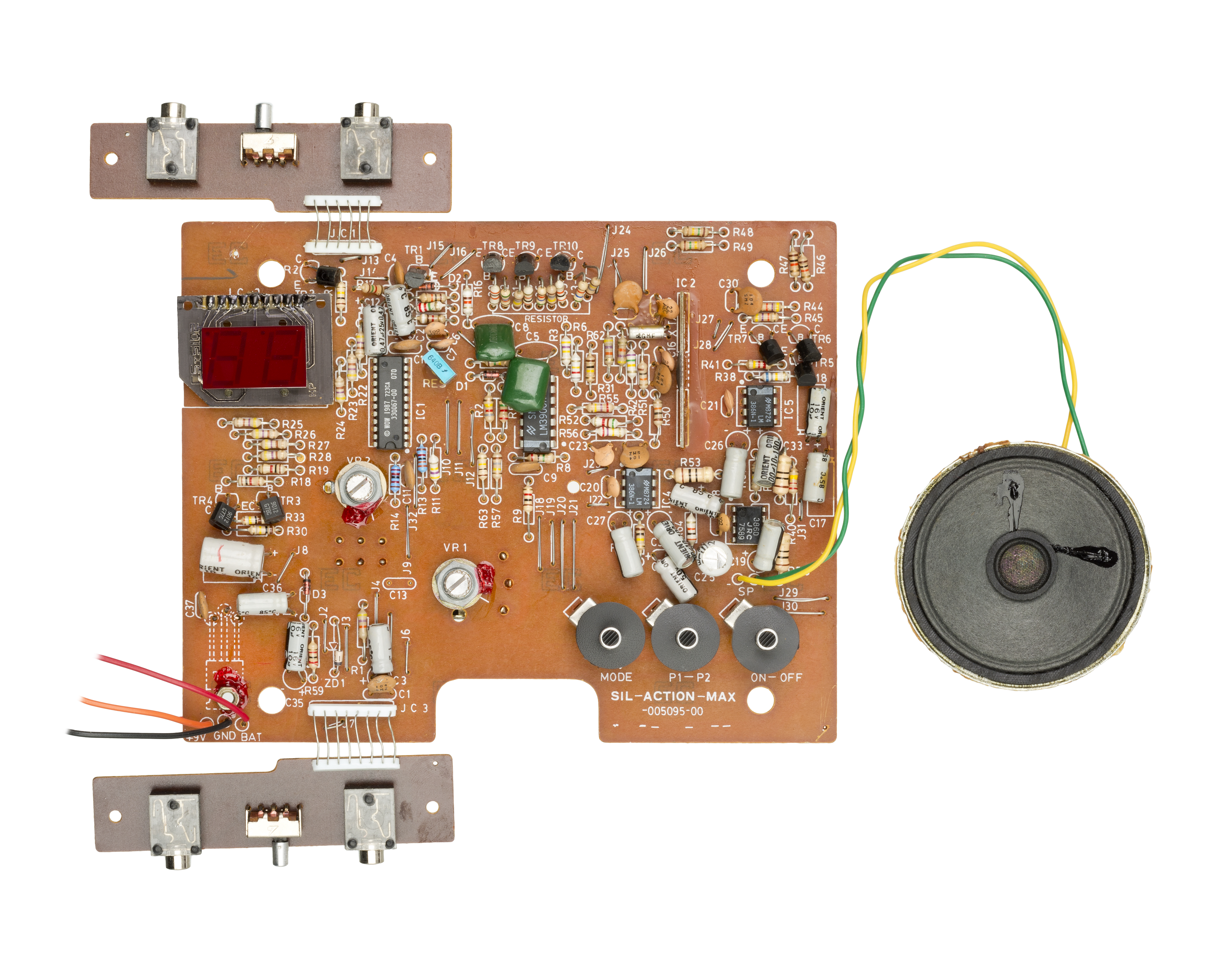
The Action Max motherboard

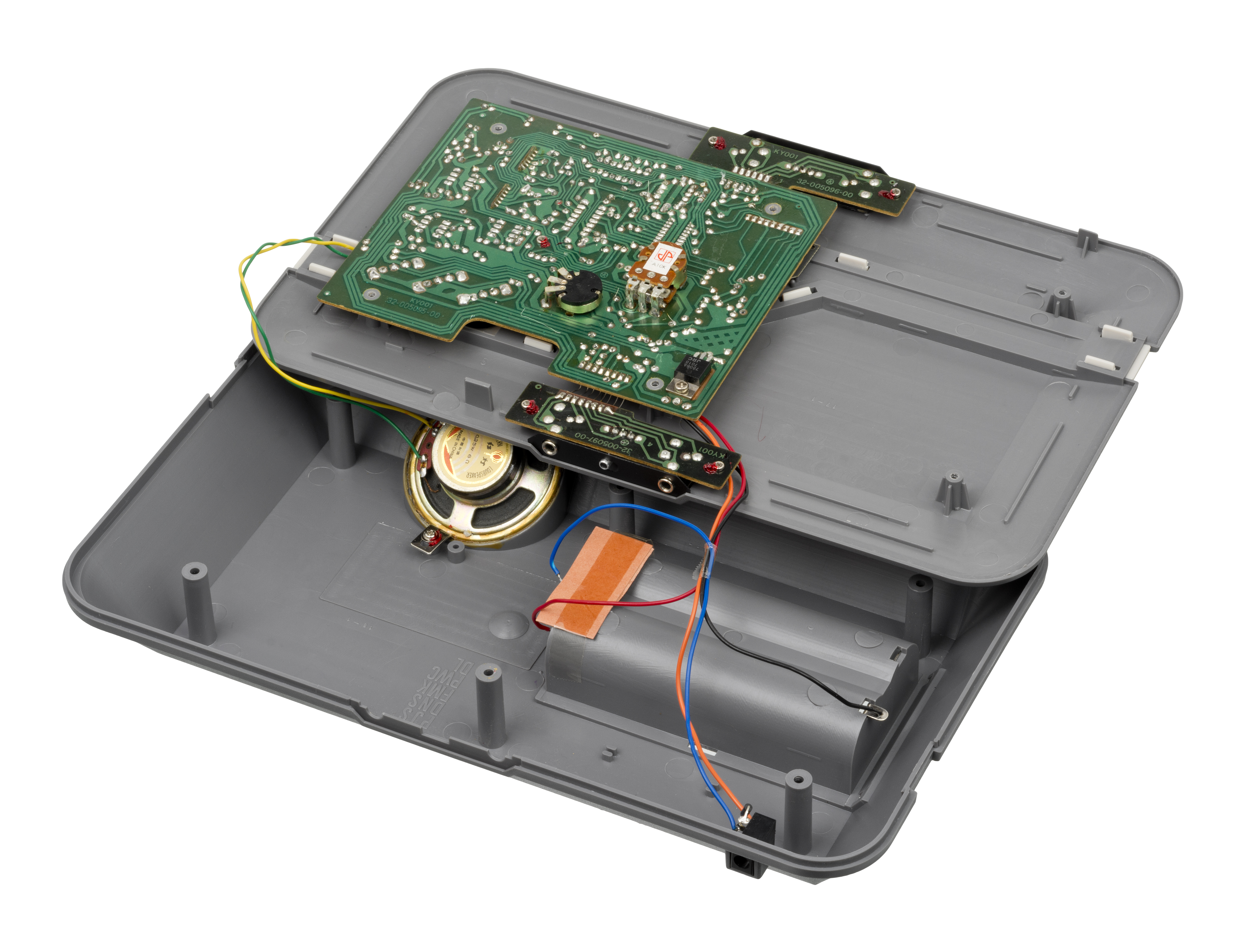
Inside the system

- CPU: HD401010
- Internal Speaker
- TV mounted "Score Signal"
- 2 character, 7 segment LED score display

== See also ==
- Control-Vision, a prototypical VHS video game console
- View-Master Interactive Vision, another VHS-based console
