= Expenditure incidence =

Expenditure incidence is the effect of government expenditure upon the distribution of private incomes. This is commonly contrasted with benefit incidence as an approach to planning and measuring the effect of a government spending programme. A pioneering analysis of this was made by the economist Richard Musgrave in his major work, The Theory of Public Finance.

Establishing the differential effect of expenditure in this way is difficult because the effect of differing policies upon taxation and overall expenditure must be normalised and it is hard to model and measure the flows of money which result.

An analysis will commonly be structured in three stages:

1. Definition of the government programmes or budgetary expenditures and the corresponding database of monetary values.
2. Determining the measures of income: the size of economic unit such as the individual, family or community; the timescale of analysis such as annual or lifetime; the well-being and externalities which arise from the expenditure.
3. The resulting effects upon income distribution as a result of the expenditure are then calculated. These will typically be presented graphically as a Lorenz curve or in the form of an index such as the Gini coefficient.
