= Incidence (video game) =

2017 video game

- App icon
- Developer: ScrollView Games
- Publisher: ScrollView Games
- Platform: iOS
- Release: March 1, 2017
- Genre: Sports
- Mode: Single-player

Incidence is a 2017 golf video game developed and published by the indie studio ScrollView Games. It was released for iOS on March 1, 2017, and has been met with a mixed reception.

== Gameplay ==
Similar to real golf, Incidence tasks the player to shoot a ball into a hole in a set number of shots (four shots to be precise). They launch the ball by dragging back on the screen, setting the power and angle of the shot. Once the ball is launched, it will bounce against the level's walls six times. On the sixth bounce, the ball stops and is ready for the player to hit again. If the player goes over par, the ball explodes, and the player has to restart the level. If the player gets the ball into the hole, the player advances to the next level.

As the player progresses through the game, the levels increase in difficulty, with new elements, such as spikes and bouncy walls, being introduced.

Incidence was released for iOS on March 1, 2017.

== Reception ==
On Metacritic, Incidence received a "mixed or average" score of 67 based on four critics. Multiple critics had mixed opinions.
