= View-Master Interactive Vision =

View-Master game console from 1988

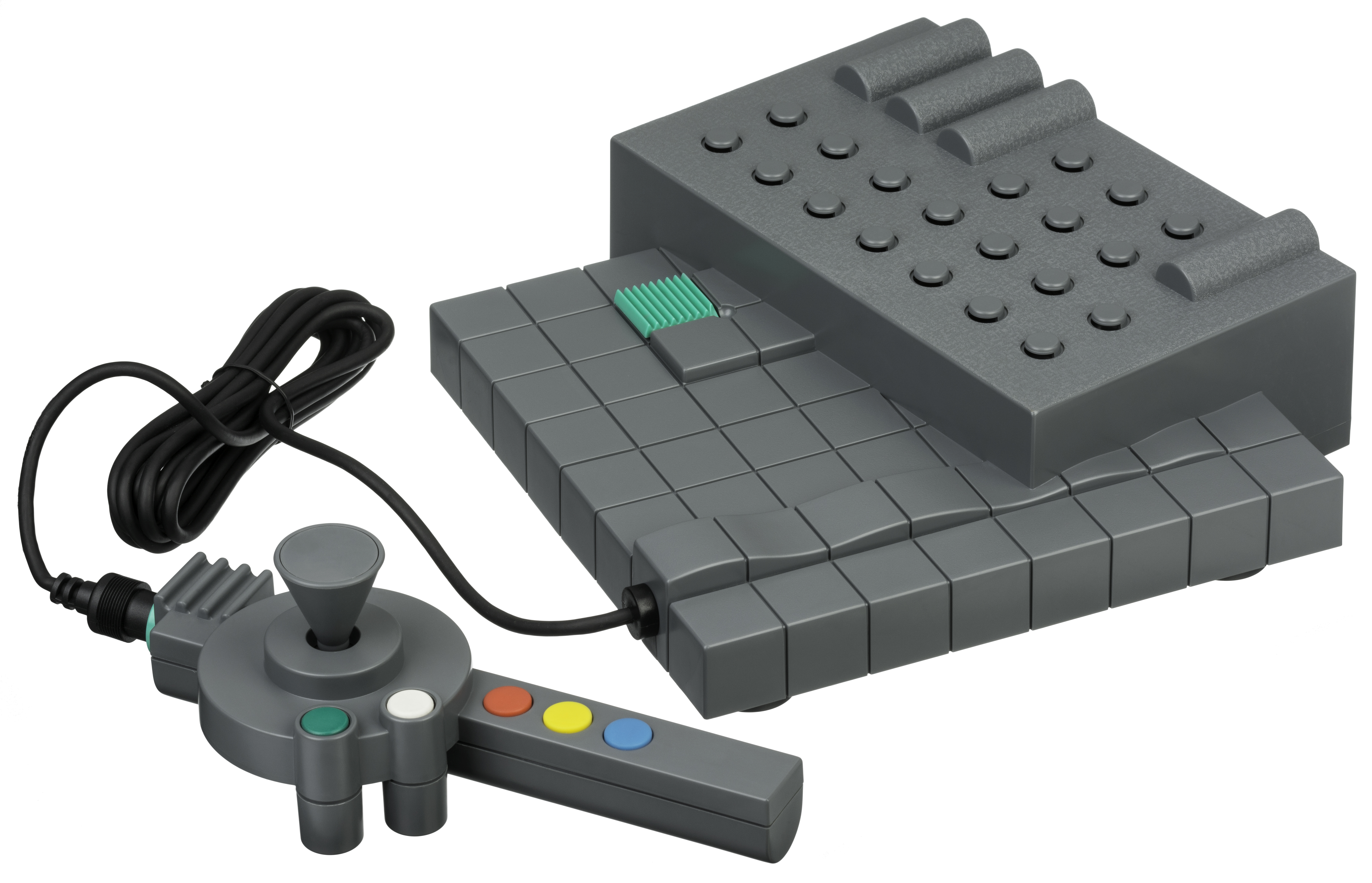
- The Interactive Vision and controller
- Manufacturer: View-Master Ideal Group, Inc. ACTV, Inc. (original concepts)
- Released: 1989; 37 years ago
- Introductory price: $120
- Storage: VHS and digital

View-Master Interactive Vision is an interactive movie VHS console game system, introduced in 1988 and released in the USA in 1989 by View-Master Ideal Group, Inc. The tagline is "the Two-Way Television System that makes you a part of the show!" The titles include four Sesame Street games, two games featuring The Muppet Show characters, and a Disney game, Disney's Cartoon Arcade.

== Gameplay ==
The system was packaged with a simple controller which includes a joystick and five colorful buttons. It also requires a VCR and videotapes that the system will add graphics to. As the video plays, the characters address the player directly, and ask the player to make a choice by pressing one of the buttons. Simple videogames with graphics similar to the ColecoVision game system are played during the course of the videotape. The Disney game is built around the "arcade-style" gameplay, including fighting ghosts and shoveling coal into a fireplace.

The video has two different soundtracks recorded, and graphic overlays that are superimposed over the video. As the game is played different audio and graphics appear in response to the player's decisions. For example, at the end of the game Muppet Madness, Kermit the Frog and Gonzo ask the player to choose to hear the closing song from their point of view. In Kermit's version, the Muppets sing a closing number called "Everything Was Wonderful!" In Gonzo's version, the closing number is "Everything Was Terrible!" Similarly, a Muppets TV show within the program is either a science fiction series or a soap opera, depending on the soundtrack, and Fozzie Bear's comedy act is successful or unsuccessful.

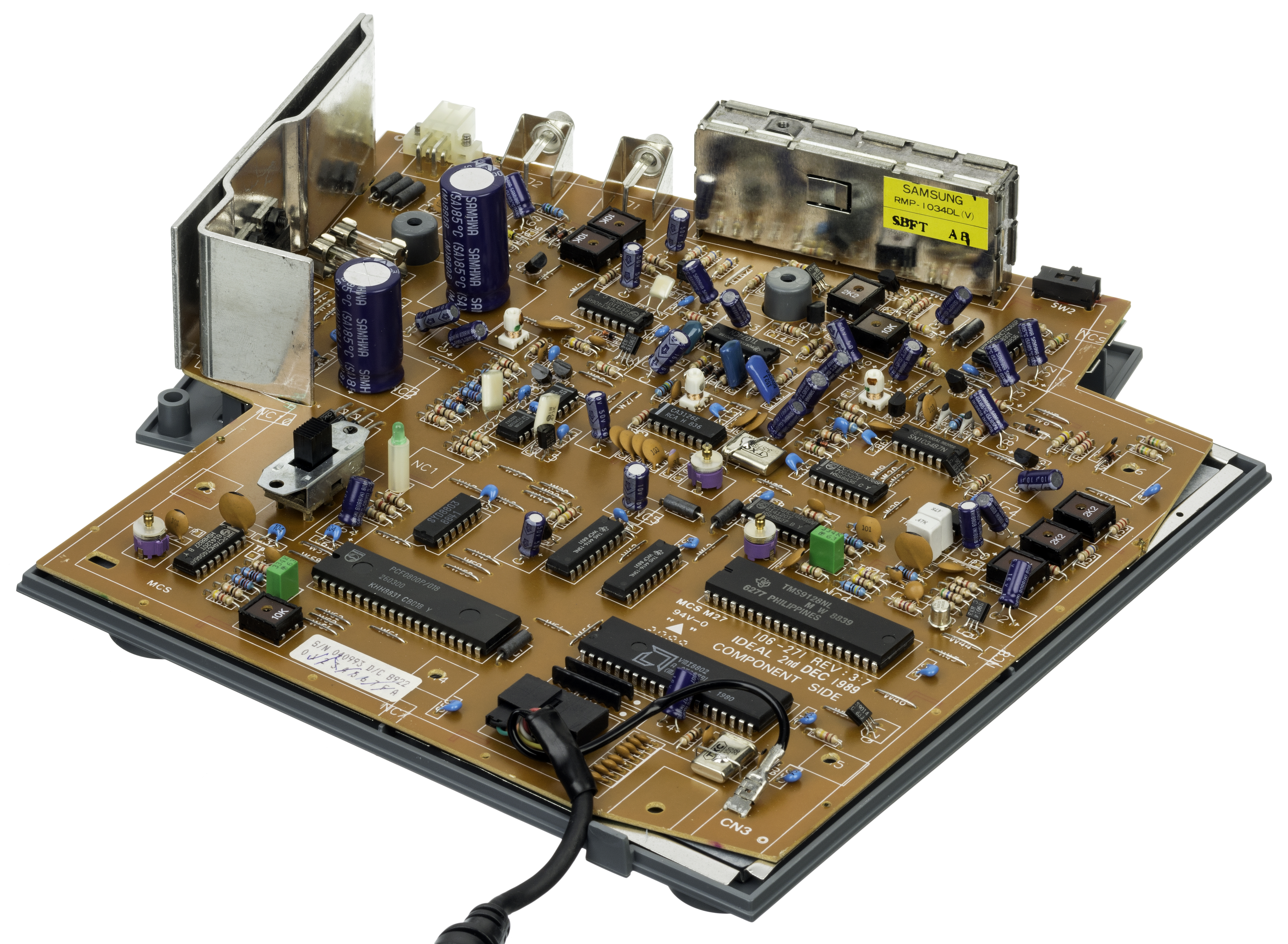
The internals of the system

Although there is only one video track, the optional parts of the soundtrack are designed to fit the movement of the Muppets' mouths, to create the illusion that the video was recorded with only one soundtrack and the digitally generated graphics then further enhance the games video interactivity.

In the game Muppets Studios Presents: You're the Director, Kermit the Frog leads the player through the process of making a Muppet movie. The player can choose to either be the "good" director or the "bad" director. During the game, the player is asked to collect money bags as they show up onscreen. If the player hasn't collected enough, the closing song's lyrics say "We've just made some movies; we're gonna go broke!"

Unlike other games, Disney's Cartoon Arcade contains a collection of arcade-like mini games, including a Frogger inspired game where Mickey Mouse must cross a busy highway in order to get to Minnie Mouse. The mini-games display 8-bit computer graphics similar to ColecoVision capabilities.

== Games ==
- Sesame Street: Let's Learn to Play Together
- Sesame Street: Magic on Sesame Street
- Sesame Street: Let's Play School
- Sesame Street: Oscar's Letter Party
- Muppet Madness
- Muppet Studios Presents: You're the Director
- Disney's Cartoon Arcade (uses footage from various classic theatrical Disney animated shorts and the Ludwig Von Drake episodes from Disney's anthology TV series)

== See also ==
- Control-Vision, another VHS-based game system
- Action Max, another VHS-based game system
