= Incidents =

1987 essay collection by Roland Barthes

- Cover of the first edition
- Author: Roland Barthes
- Original title: Incidents
- Language: French
- Publisher: Éditions du Seuil
- Publication date: 1987
- Publication place: France

Incidents is a 1987 collection of four essays by Roland Barthes. It was published posthumously by François Wahl, Barthes' literary executor.

== Summary ==
In the first essay, La Lumiere du Sud-Ouest, first published in L'Humanité in 1977, Roland Barthes reflects on the South West of France, the Adour and Bayonne. The second essay, Incidents, written in 1969, details Barthes's holiday in Morocco, where he pays men and boys for sex. In Au Palace Ce Soir, the third essay, first published in issue 10 of Vogue-Hommes in May 1978, Barthes describes Le Palace, a fashionable theatre-house in Paris. The fourth essay, Soirées de Paris, is a diary from August to September 1979, where Roland Barthes admits to using male escorts as all his relationships have been disappointing to him.

== Literary significance and criticism ==
Although critics have questioned whether Roland Barthes intended to publish Incidents and Soirées de Paris, it has been argued that they have informed our reading of Barthes's oeuvre because of their explicit revelations of his homosexuality. Drawing upon these essays, D.A. Miller, in Bringing Out Roland Barthes, re-reads Barthes's oeuvre through a gay lens.

The essay Incidents has been compared to André Gide's Amyntas with its pastoral theme, although Gide writes about Tunisia and Algeria rather than Morocco. It has also been compared to Jean-Jacques Rousseau's Confessions.
