= List of best-selling game consoles =

The following table contains video game consoles that have sold at least 1 million units worldwide either through to consumers or inside retail channels. Each console includes sales from every iteration unless otherwise noted. The years correspond to when the first version of each console was released (excluding test markets).

== Best-selling consoles ==
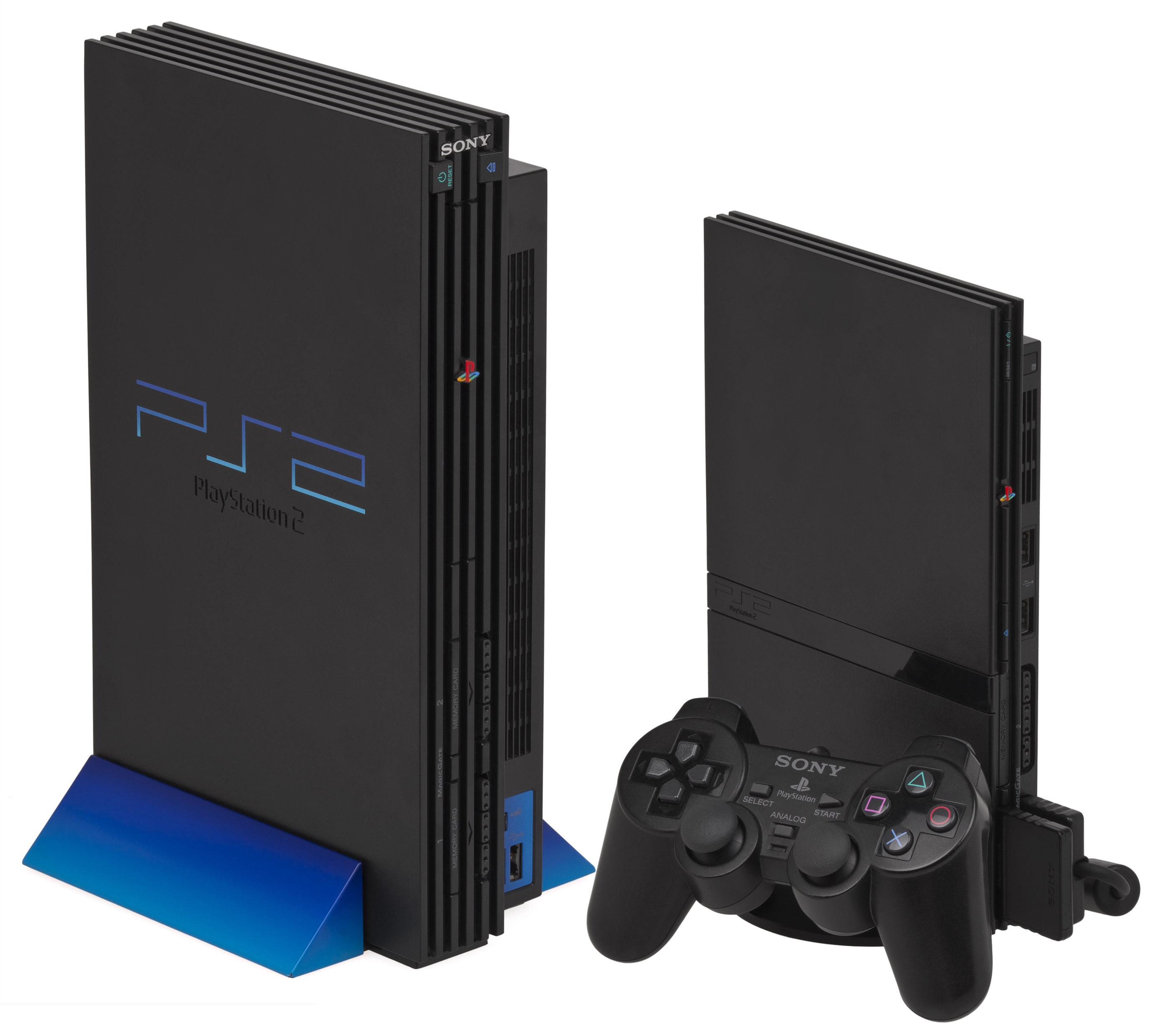
Sony's PlayStation 2 is the best-selling console of all time, with 160 million units sold worldwide.

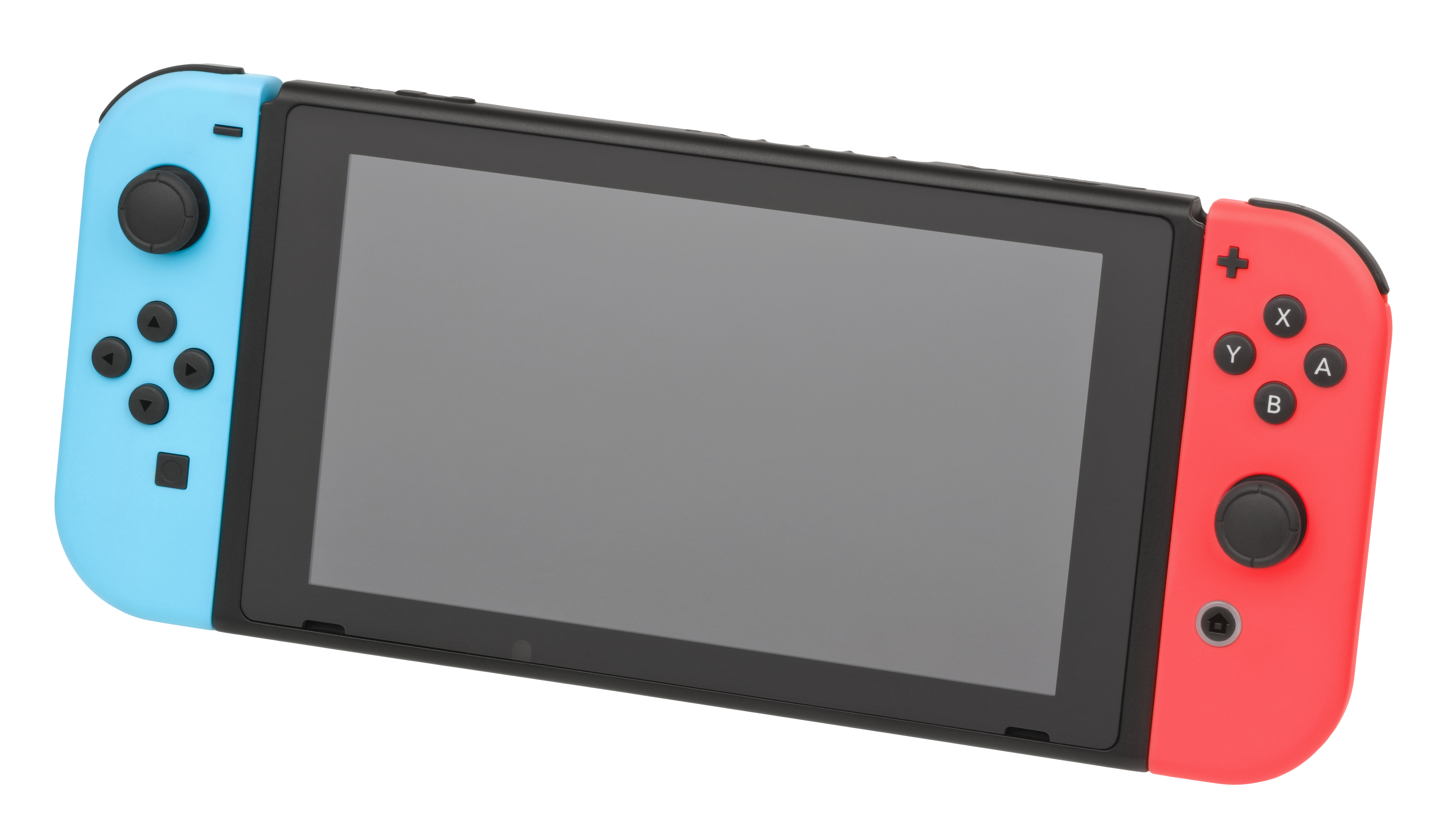
The Nintendo Switch is the second best-selling console of all time and the best selling console that is currently on the market, selling 157.20 million units worldwide.

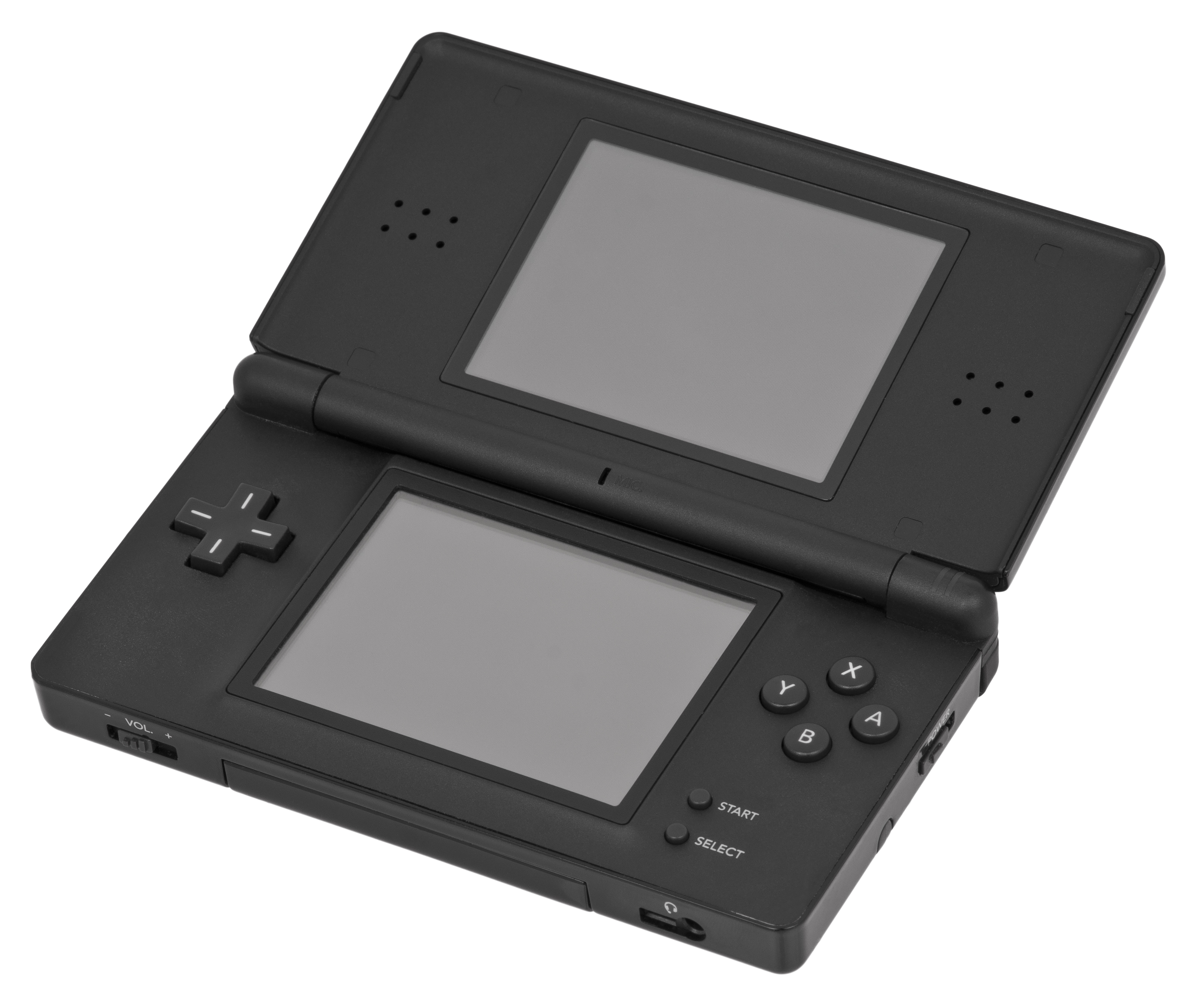
The Nintendo DS is the third best-selling console of all time, with 154.02 million units sold worldwide.

Background shading and # indicates consoles currently on the market.

Platform	Type	Company	Released^{[2]}	Units sold	Ref.
PlayStation 2	Home	Sony	2000	160 million	
Nintendo Switch #	Hybrid	Nintendo	2017	157.2 million	(Note: Including Nintendo Switch Lite and OLED units)
Nintendo DS	Handheld	Nintendo	2004	154.02 million	(Note: Including Nintendo DS Lite, DSi and DSi XL units)
Game Boy & Game Boy Color	Handheld	Nintendo	1989, 1998	118.69 million	(Note: Nintendo only provided a combined sales total. Before Game Boy Color's release in late 1998,^{[2]} previous models sold 64.42 million units combined worldwide.)
PlayStation 4 #	Home	Sony	2013	117.2 million	
PlayStation	Home	Sony	1994	102.49 million	
Wii	Home	Nintendo	2006	101.63 million	
PlayStation 5 #	Home	Sony	2020	^{>}100 million	
PlayStation 3	Home	Sony	2006	87.4 million	
Xbox 360	Home	Microsoft	2005	84 million	
Game Boy Advance	Handheld	Nintendo	2001	81.51 million	(Note: Including Game Boy Advance SP and Micro units)
PlayStation Portable	Handheld	Sony	2004	80 million	
Nintendo 3DS	Handheld	Nintendo	2011	75.94 million	
Family Computer/Nintendo Entertainment System	Home	Nintendo	1983	61.91 million	
Xbox One	Home	Microsoft	2013	58 million	
Super Famicom/Super Nintendo Entertainment System	Home	Nintendo	1990	49.1 million	
Xbox Series X/S #	Home	Microsoft	2020	35 million	
Nintendo 64	Home	Nintendo	1996	32.93 million	
Mega Drive/Genesis	Home	Sega	1988	30.75 million	(Note: 30.75 million sold by Sega worldwide as of March 1996, not including sales of third-party licensed consoles from manufacturers such as Majesco in the United States (which projected it would sell 1.5 million) or Tec Toy in Brazil (listed separately))
Atari 2600	Home	Atari	1977	30 million	
Nintendo Switch 2 #	Hybrid	Nintendo	2025	26.35 million	
Xbox	Home	Microsoft	2001	24 million	
Nintendo GameCube	Home	Nintendo	2001	21.74 million	
Quest 2	VR headset	Reality Labs	2020	20 million	
PlayStation Vita	Handheld	Sony	2011	16 million	
Game Gear	Handheld	Sega	1990	14 million	
Wii U	Home	Nintendo	2012	13.56 million	
Sega Mark III/Master System	Home	Sega	1985	13 million	
V.Smile & V.Motion	Home	VTech	2004, 2007	11 million	
PC Engine/TurboGrafx-16	Home	NEC/Hudson Soft (Note: Designed by Hudson and manufactured and marketed by NEC)	1987	10 million	
Sega Saturn	Home	Sega	1994	9.26 million	
Dreamcast	Home	Sega	1998	9.13 million	
Master System (Brazilian variants)	Home	Tectoy	1989	8 million	
Leapster	Handheld	Leapfrog	2003	7 million	
Dendy (famiclone)	Home	Micro Genius	1992	6 million	
Super NES Classic Edition	Dedicated	Nintendo	2017	5.28 million	
Advanced Pico Beena	Home	Sega	2005	4.1 million	
Sega Pico	Home	Sega	1993	3.8 million	(Note: Sega sold this amount as of April 2005. Its successor launched on August 6, 2005. Majesco re-manufactured and distributed the Pico in the United States starting at the end of 1999.)
Intellivision	Home	Mattel	1980	3.75 million	
NES Classic Edition	Dedicated	Nintendo	2016	3.56 million	
WonderSwan & WonderSwan Color	Handheld	Bandai	1999, 2000	3.5 million	(Note: Bandai released three WonderSwan iterations. A March 2003 Famitsu article reported the original (March 1999) and color (December 2000) versions sold approximately 3 million units combined, while the SwanCrystal (July 2002) sold over 200 thousand units. Bandai announced the transition from hardware to third-party development in February 2003 due to declining sales and would supply software to Nintendo's Game Boy Advance by March 2004. Average weekly Famitsu sales during the transition were only a couple hundred units,^{[1]} and the SwanCrystal went build to order starting in autumn 2003. WonderSwan hardware designer Koto claimed over 3.5 million were sold.)
Color TV-Game	Dedicated	Nintendo	1977	3 million	
Mega Drive (Brazilian variants)	Home	Tectoy	1990	3 million	
N-Gage	Handheld	Nokia	2003	3 million	
ColecoVision	Home	Coleco	1982	^{>}2 million	(Note: The ColecoVision reached 2 million units sold by the spring of 1984. Console quarterly sales dramatically decreased at this time, but it continued to sell modestly with most inventory gone by October 1985.)
Magnavox Odyssey²	Home	Magnavox/Philips	1978	2 million	
Sega SG-1000	Home	Sega	1983	2 million	
Atari Lynx	Handheld	Atari	1989	2 million	
3DO	Home	The 3DO Company (Note: Developed by The 3DO Company and manufactured by Panasonic, Sanyo, GoldStar and Creative Technology.)	1993	2 million	
Neo Geo Pocket & Neo Geo Pocket Color	Handheld	SNK	1998, 1999	2 million	
Oculus Go	VR headset	Oculus	2018	2 million	
Meta Quest 3 #	VR headset	Reality Labs	2023	^{>}1.7 million	(Note: Includes Quest 3S sales)
Mega Drive/Genesis Mini	Dedicated	Sega	2019	^{>}1.5 million	
Telstar	Dedicated	Coleco	1976	^{>}1 million	(Note: Coleco launched Telstar in 1976 and sold a million. Production and delivery issues, and dedicated consoles being replaced by electronic handheld games dramatically reduced sales in 1977. Over a million Telstars were scrapped in 1978, and it cost Coleco $22.3 million that year—almost bankrupting the company.)
Atari 7800	Home	Atari	1986	^{>}1 million	(Note: Atari reported on June 1, 1988 that the 7800 sold more than one million units to date. Production and support of the 7800 was officially discontinued in 1992.)
Philips CD-i	Home	Philips	1990	^{>}1 million	(Note: This Philips-reported figure was in The New York Times on September 15, 1994. The CD-i was discontinued in 1998.)
Atari 5200	Home	Atari	1982	1 million	
Pegasus (famiclone)	Home	Micro Genius	1991	1 million	
Nex Playground #	Home	Nex	2023	1 million	

^{>}Final sales are greater than the reported figure. See notes.
