= Sergei Suponev =

- Born: 28 January 1963; Khotkovo, Moscow Oblast, USSR
- Died: 8 December 2001 (aged 38); Edimonovo, Konakovsky District, Tver Oblast, Russia
- Occupations: television director, presenter
- Spouse(s): Valeria Suponeva; Olga Motina
- Awards: TEFI-99 (Call of the Jungles)

Sergei Yevgenyevich Suponev (Russian: Серге́й Евге́ньевич Супо́нев; 28 January 1963 – 8 December 2001) was a TEFI-award winning Soviet and Russian television director, children's television presenter and a manager of children's programming on Channel One.

== Biography ==
Sergei Suponev was born in Khotkovo, Moscow Oblast in 1963. He entered Lomonosov Moscow State University (Faculty of Journalism), but dropped out after a year and joined the army. In 1980 he was hired by Central Television, at first as a stevedore, but by 1983 had worked his way up to be the administrator of the musical editorial staff team. In 1984-1986 Suponev worked as a manager in the propaganda department, and since 1986 served as a script writer for television show Till 16 and older.... Returning to his studies he graduated from Moscow State University in 1988. In 1989 he hosted his first television show Marafon 15. In 1997 he debuted as a screen actor in Dandelion Wine. The same year Vladislav Listyev invited him to work on children's show The Finest Hour. Since then Suponev created and hosted several successful shows, including Call of the Jungles, for which he won the TEFI in 1999. Subsequently, he worked on almost every children's program on Channel One.

== Death ==
On December 8, 2001, at the age of 38 he died in a snowmobile accident in Tver Oblast.

== Programs ==
- 1986: Till 16 and older... (script writer)
- 1989–1998: Marafon 15 (author, presenter)
- 1992–2001: Time of Stars (presenter, later director)
- 1993–1997: Call of the Jungles (author, presenter)
- 1994–1996: Dendy — The New Reality (author, presenter)
- 1997–1999: These Amusing Animals (author)
- 1998–2001: Seven Troubles, One Response (producer)
- 1999–2001: King of the Mountain (producer)
- 2000: The Seventh Sense (author, producer)
- 2001: Last Hero (author, producer)
