= PolyStation =

Name for Sony PlayStation unofficial clones

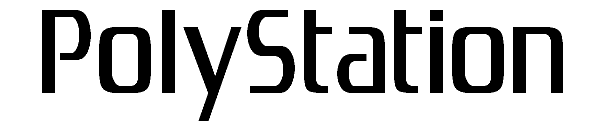

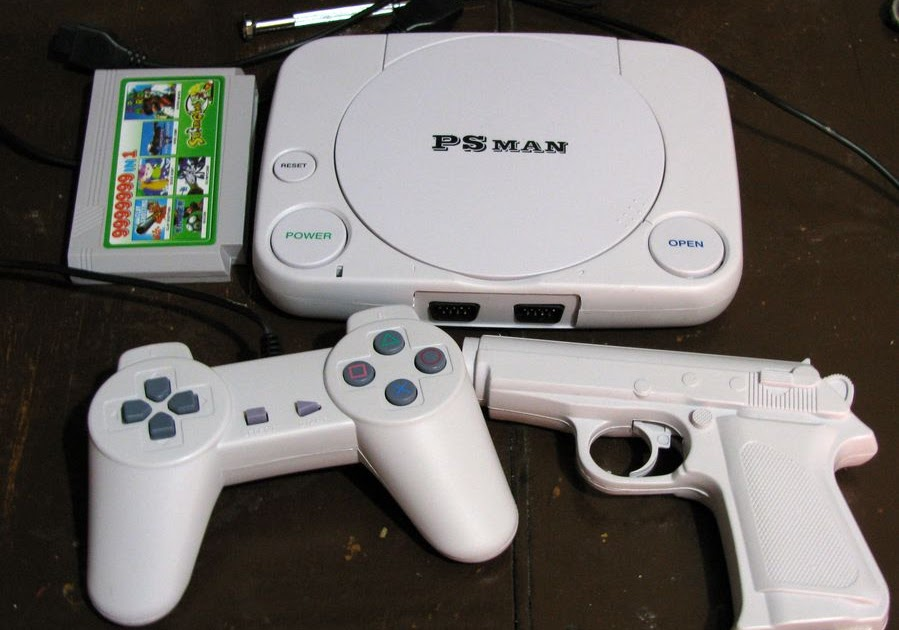
- Close-up image of PolyStation variant with a multicart
- Also known as: PolyStation II, PolyStation III, Super PolyStation, PolyStation 2, PolyStation 3; PS-Kid, Game Player, Extra TV Game, Play and Power, FunStation, PSMan, FunStation 3
- Type: Famiclone
- Released: 1997

PolyStation is a counterfeit video game console and Famiclone that closely resembles a Sony PlayStation, particularly the PS1 variant. The cartridge slot of the PS1-clone systems is located under the lid which, on an original PlayStation, covers the disc drive.

== History ==
According to few sources, Polystation was released in 1997 in China. Over the following decades it became popular in many places around the world like Latin America, Africa, Asia and Europe, where due to its low price, was still on top in 2000s.

Each country has a different story of a PolyStation release. For example, in Brazil, the system was distributed from 2000 by Western businessman Ali Ahmad Zaioum, of Paraguayan-Lebanese origin. He also owns around 400 patents and trademarks supposedly created by him. However, he was accused by the Paraguayan court of falsifying documents and information in order to obtain registration with the Ministry of Industry and Commerce of Paraguay. In 2015, PolyStations proved to be popular in parts of Costa Rica.

== Variations of the PolyStation ==
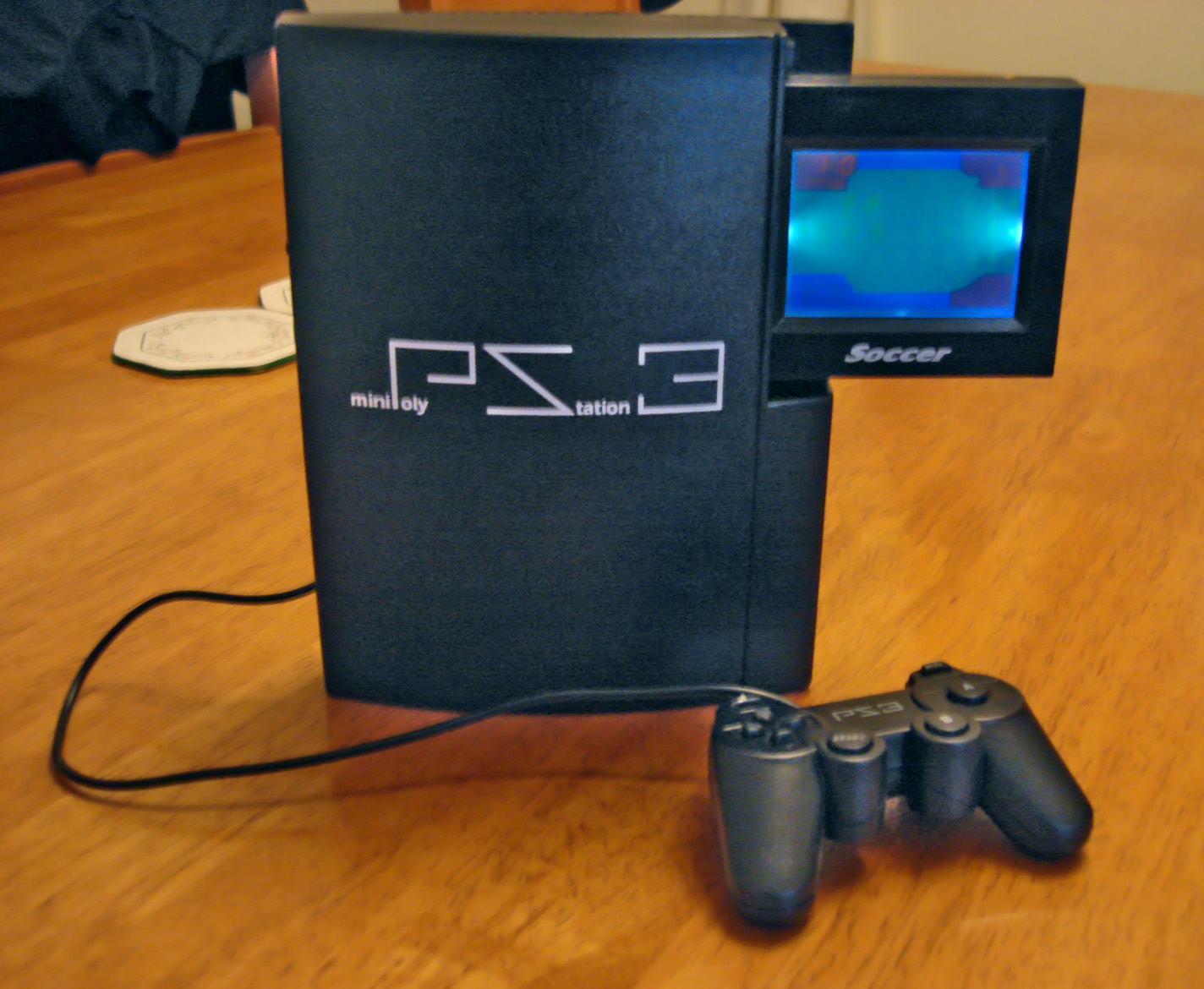
Mini PolyStation 3 with an attachable controller and a small LCD screen

PolyStation consoles are sold under many different names, including the PS-Kid, Game Player, Play and Power, FunStation, Extra TV Game, and PSMan; there are also a number of variations on the PolyStation name, such as PolyStation II, PolyStation III and Super PolyStation.

Some of these consoles resemble the original PlayStation, others the PSone redesign, and others the PlayStation 2, PlayStation 3 (as FunStation 3) and PlayStation 4. More recent models, such as the Game Station 5, resemble the PlayStation 5. Some variations include built-in unlicensed games, and in many cases these games are modified copies of licensed games.

Other versions of the console include the Mini PolyStation 2 and 3, which are small versions of the PolyStation 2 and 3 and come with an attachable controller. They have a small LCD screen, and are playable handheld games.

== See also ==
- Micro Genius
