= Dragon Plus =

Dragon Plus may refer to:

- Velikiy Drakon, a Russian former video game magazine
- Dragon+, the online replacement for Dragon (magazine) from Wizards of the Coast for their Dungeons & Dragons role-playing game
