= Dendy =

Series of home video game consoles

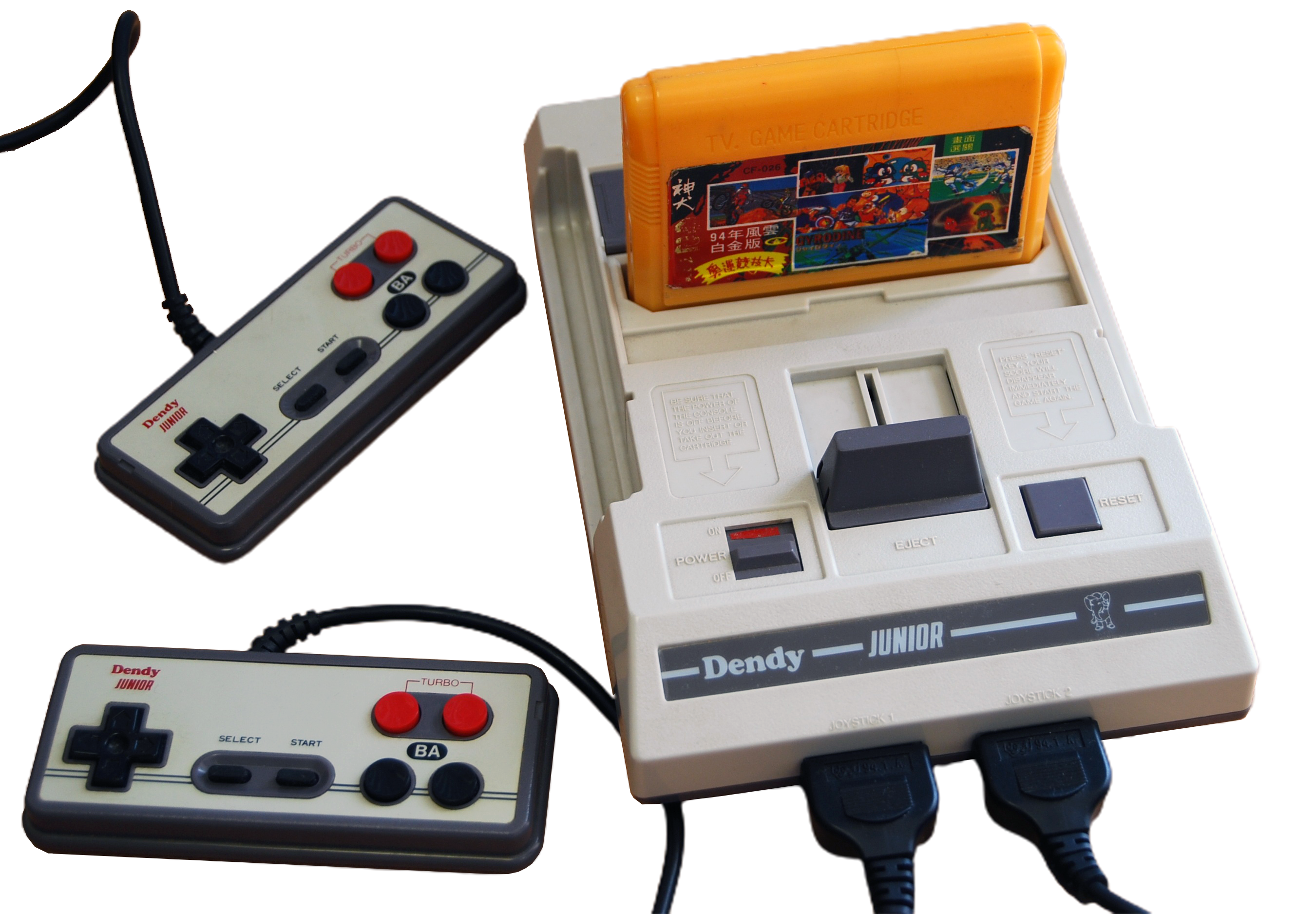
- The Dendy Junior with a cartridge and detachable controllers
- Developer: Steepler
- Manufacturer: TXC Corporation; Subor; "Tensor" factory, Dubna
- Product family: Family Computer hardware clone
- Type: Home video game console
- Released: RUS: 17 December 1992
- Discontinued: 1998
- Units sold: 1.5 to 6 million
- Media: ROM cartridge
- CPU: Ricoh 2A03

Dendy (Russian: Де́нди) is a series of home video game consoles that were unofficial hardware clones of Nintendo's third-generation Family Computer system. Released on 17 December 1992, Dendy consoles were manufactured in Taiwan using Chinese components on behalf of the Russian company Steepler. These consoles were primarily sold in Russia. Over time, production expanded to include assembly at the Chinese Subor factory and the Russian Tensor factory in Dubna, Moscow Oblast. The Dendy consoles were based on Japanese hardware designs and cartridge formats, which differed slightly from their American counterparts.

The Dendy product line was divided into two categories: the main Classic series and the budget-oriented Junior series. These categories differed in design, quality, and price. The Classic models were replicas of the Micro Genius consoles produced by Taiwan's TXC Corporation and were manufactured in the same factory. The Junior models, developed specifically for Steepler, employed a cost-effective design based on a system-on-a-chip architecture. Steepler also planned to release a Pro version featuring one wired and one wireless gamepad. However, this model was only produced in a single, limited batch.

Because the Famicom and Nintendo Entertainment System were never officially sold in post-Soviet states, the Dendy achieved great popularity in the region. Its marketing strategy included television shows and video game publications. The brand name "Dendy" became genericized in Russia, referring not only to other Famicom hardware clones, colloquially called Famiclones, but also to various gaming consoles. Production of the original Dendy ceased in 1998 following Steepler's bankruptcy. By then, sales estimates ranged from 1.5 to 6 million units. The Dendy is regarded as the catalyst for the video game and console market in Russia.

== History ==
=== Beginning ===
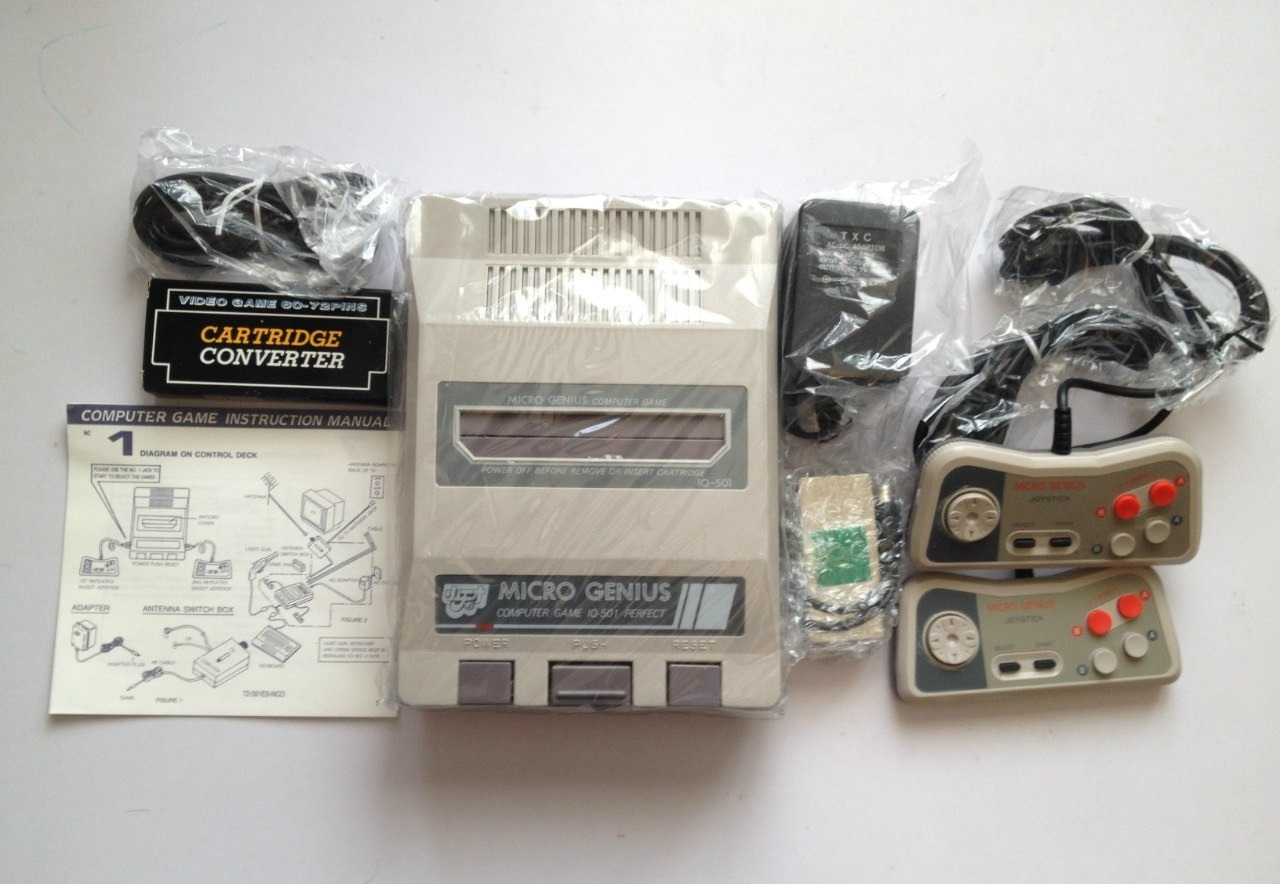
Micro Genius IQ-501 console, which Steepler marketed as the Dendy Classic

In 1992, Russian entrepreneur Viktor Savyuk approached Steepler, a company primarily focused on distributing Hewlett-Packard products and localizing the Windows 3.x operating system using the CyrWin package. Savyuk proposed the development and sale of television game consoles and interchangeable game cartridges under the Dendy brand. The company's founders, who were also doing in system integration, recognized the potential for expansion into the gaming industry. As a result, Steepler established a "Video Games Department" (Russian: Отдел видеоигр) in September 1992, with Savyuk joining the newly formed division.

While searching for potential partners, Steepler did not pursue selling Nintendo's original Famicom, as Nintendo showed no interest in the Commonwealth of Independent States market and their consoles were three times more expensive than bootleg clones. Instead, Savyuk established connections with Taiwanese manufacturers, eventually leading to Steepler's deal with TXC Corporation, which produced Famiclones sold under the Micro Genius brand. The first console sold by Steepler under the Dendy brand was the Micro Genius IQ-501 model, marketed as the Dendy Classic. When choosing the brand name, Savyuk selected the English word "dandy", referring to a man who pays meticulous attention to aesthetic appearance, behavior, and refined speech. The letter "a" was replaced with "e" for easier reading in Russian. The logo was set in Cooper Black font in red.

Russian artist Ivan Maximov designed the mascot for the Dendy console, which featured a small elephant. The console was promoted through a television advertisement in Russia with the "Dendy, Dendy, we all love Dendy! Dendy — everybody plays!" slogan. The musical group "Neschastny Sluchay" played a significant role in the commercial's creation. Keyboardist Sergey Chekryzhov composed the music, while guitarist Andrey Guvakov developed the slogan. The group also contributed to the commercial's animation. The advertisement was broadcast through Video International company two weeks before the product launch.

The Dendy console was first released on 17 December 1992, with a retail price of 39,000 rubles (equivalent to US$94 at the time). However, a technical oversight during the market launch resulted in the first batch of consoles using the PAL-I video standard, which was incompatible with the SECAM-DK standard used by most televisions in the Soviet Union. Consequently, the entire initial shipment required repair and video standard conversion in Moscow. The first branded stores opened in Moscow on Petrovka Street, Krasnaya Presnya, and in the underground passage connecting the Teatralnaya metro station to Red Square near GUM department store. By February 1993, sales had reached up to 3,000 units per month. Game sales also proved profitable, prompting Steepler managers to travel to various regions to seek out local dealers and purchase advertising.

Demand for Dendy consoles proved exceptionally high. By April 1993, Steepler had established four regional dealerships and achieved a turnover of 500 million rubles (US$722,000). By autumn of 1993, daily sales reached up to 4,000 units. A consumer demand survey revealed that Dendy ranked third in the "home electronics" category, behind only refrigerators and televisions. The Dendy brand name became genericized, often used to refer to other Famicom hardware clones and even different gaming consoles. Steepler had effectively cornered a largely untapped market, as major global video game and console manufacturers showed little interest in Russia at the time. The company's main competition came from the "grey" import market of similar Chinese-made products. By the end of 1994, Steepler's annual turnover had reached 75-80 million US dollars. Eventually, the company suspended its advertising campaign due to demand exceeding supply.

=== Magazines and TV shows ===
Steepler's market research into print media led to a partnership with the publishers of Video-Ace Computer Games (Russian: Видео-Асс Компьютерные Игры) magazine. This collaboration gave rise to Video-Ace Dendy, the first wholly video-game-oriented Russian magazine, debuted in summer 1993 under the editorship of Valery Polyakov. Initially, the magazine functioned largely as a promotional vehicle for Steepler's product line, with the first seven issues focusing heavily on Dendy-related content. The magazine's scope was broadened through an agreement with French publisher Hachette Filipacchi-Press, which permitted the reprinting of articles from French gaming magazines Joypad and Joystick. As Steepler's product range expanded to include Sega Mega Drive and Super Nintendo Entertainment System consoles, the magazine's coverage grew to encompass these platforms as well.

Following funding delays, the contract for publishing Video-Ace Dendy was terminated. Steepler then launched its own magazine, Dendy: Novaya Realnost' (Russian: Денди: Новая Реальность, lit. 'Dendy: The New Reality'), produced by the editorial team of Ptyuch magazine. Content for this new publication was primarily written by Steepler's advertising department staff. Six issues later, Dendy: Novaya Realnost' ceased publication entirely. Meanwhile, the former editorial team of Video-Ace Dendy resumed publication independently of Steepler under the Velikiy Drakon name.

Dendy: Novaya Realnost', a television program focused on video games, premiered on Channel 2x2 in September 1994. The show was produced by Steepler and hosted by Sergei Suponev, who had previously presented Star Hour and Call of the Jungles. Content featured games for Dendy, Mega Drive, and Super NES platforms. The initial run of 33 episodes garnered high ratings and significant popularity. After a brief hiatus, the show returned on ORT channel with a shortened title, Novaya Realnost'. The second season placed less emphasis on Dendy games. The program concluded in January 1996. The cancellation was attributed to multiple factors, including an unfavorable broadcast time (3:45 PM on Fridays) that limited the target audience's ability to watch, and increased production costs, which doubled from $50,000 to $100,000 per episode. Following the end of Novaya Realnost', MTK TV Channel launched Mir Dendy (Russian: Мир Денди, lit. 'Dendy World'), hosted by Semyon Furman and Sergey Gvozdev. This program ran for 12 episodes before being closed.

=== Nintendo contract, competition, and downfall ===
In 1994, Dendy console sales reached 100,000-125,000 units per month, generating a monthly turnover of $5 million. By 1995, the company expanded its marketing efforts, hiring Russian singer Oleg Gazmanov and his son Rodion as brand ambassadors. Additionally, a short animated film titled The Adventures of Dendy the Elephant was produced by the Argus animation studio. Although a 13-episode series was planned, it never materialized. Savyuk later revealed that the company discovered a user loyalty rate exceeding 80%, rendering further advertising unnecessary. Steepler expanded its operations by establishing three new divisions: Steepler Graphic Center for computer graphics creation, Steepler Trading for computer hardware sales, and a programming education center. Shortly thereafter, Steepler underwent a reorganization, resulting in the separation of the Steepler Trading retail network into an independent company called Lamport.

Steepler sought to establish a partnership with Nintendo, attempting to contact the company's European division through its regional office in Germany. Initially, Nintendo did not respond to these overtures. However, upon learning of the popularity of 8-bit console clones in Russia, Nintendo reached out to Steepler in spring 1994. The company invited Victor Savyuk to Seattle for a meeting with Nintendo of America executives Minoru Arakawa and Howard Lincoln. Following several days of negotiations, Steepler and Nintendo reached an agreement. Under its terms, Steepler ceased promoting Sega products and obtained exclusive distribution rights for Super Nintendo Entertainment System and Game Boy consoles in Commonwealth of Independent States and all post-Soviet states. The agreement also stipulated that Nintendo would refrain from pursuing legal action regarding Dendy sales.

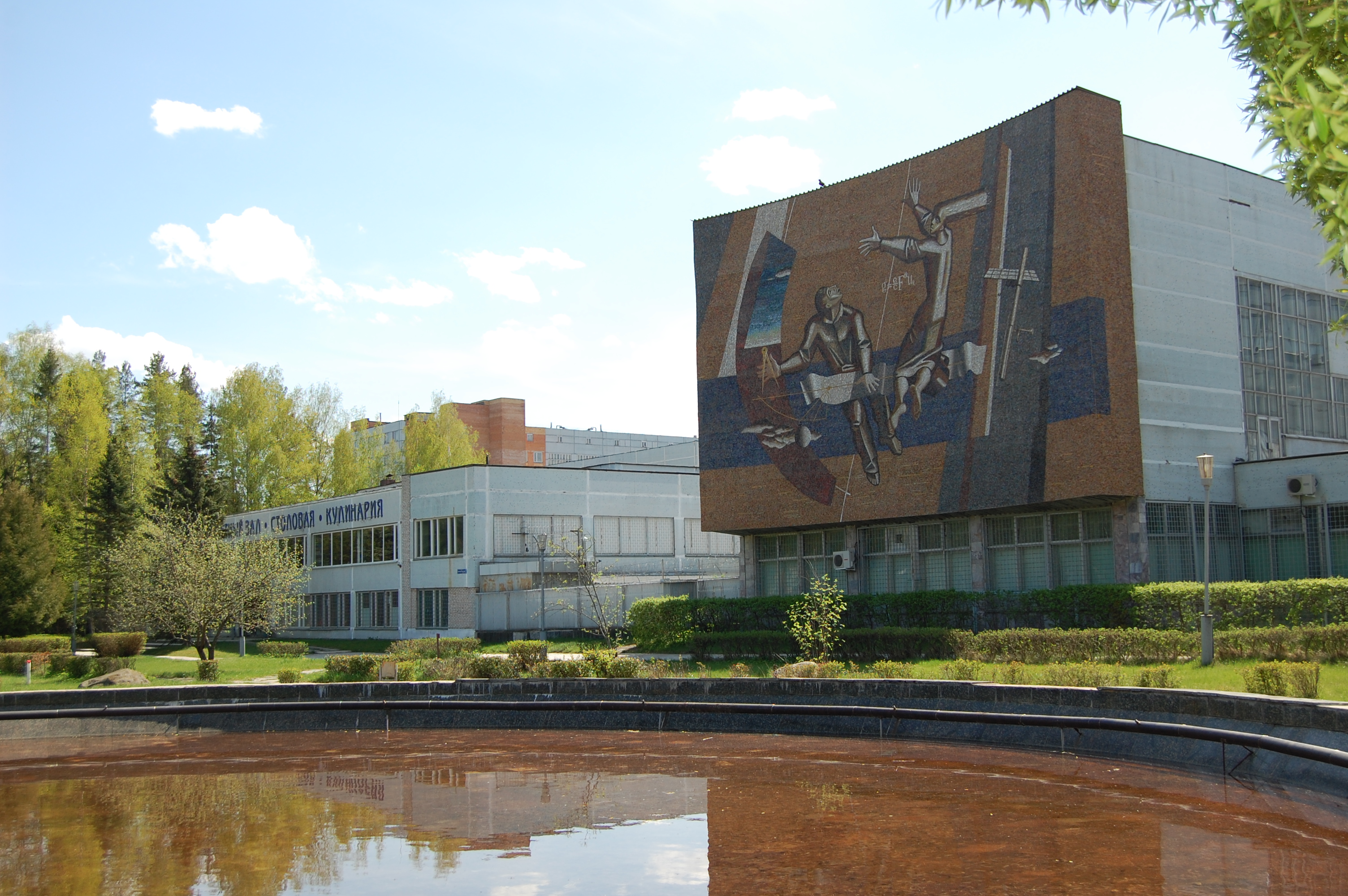
Tensor instrument factory in Dubna has been locally assembling and providing warranty repairs for Dendy consoles since 1994.

In August 1994, Inkombank and Steepler announced plans to establish a joint venture called AOZT "Dendy". The agreement stipulated that Incombank would provide capital investment and receive 30% of the profits. Two operational units were established: one handling wholesale distribution with Inkombank's financial support, and another managing retail operations in Moscow. As part of this expansion, Steepler purchased shares in the Tensor factory located in Dubna. Initially, the facility produced consoles and cartridges using partially Taiwanese components. However, high production costs led to the plant's conversion into a warranty repair center for the gaming systems.

In late 1994, Steepler faced new competition from two companies: Lamport, which began producing its own console called Kenga, and Bitman, which imported Famicom, Mega Drive, and Game Boy clones from Taiwan. Kenga distinguished itself by offering a portable console called Ken-Boy. In 1996, Bitman secured an official agreement with Sega, allowing them to sell licensed Mega Drive 2, Mega CD 2, Mega Drive 32X, Game Gear, Sega Saturn, and the educational Sega Pico consoles. Both companies closed their game businesses a year and a half later; Kenga restructured its business to focus on children's goods stores, while Bitman was acquired by the R-Style retail chain.

In January 1995, sales dropped noticeably, and an investigation revealed that competitors had begun importing consoles from China, allowing them to undercut Dendy's prices. At this time, Dendy consoles were still manufactured in Taiwan. Concurrently, Chinese company Subor entered the market. Subor had previously approached Steepler for collaboration but was rejected. With support from the Chinese government, Subor established an office in Moscow and engaged in price dumping. Subsequently, Subor proposed that Steepler transfer production to Subor's factory, making the wholesale price $8–9 per unit as compared to the previous $12 at the Taiwanese factory. Steepler accepted these terms and placed an order for 80,000 Dendy consoles from Chinese factories. Additionally, Steepler secured exclusive distribution rights for Subor SB-225 and SB-225B consoles through its stores. These measures restored sales to previous levels. By November 1995, the Dendy company had established 10 regional subsidiaries and 80 dealers. Retail prices for consoles decreased to approximately $20.

By the mid-1990s, 16-bit consoles like Mega Drive and Super Nintendo were being superseded in Western markets by next-generation systems such as the original PlayStation. In Russia, the era of 8-bit consoles was also drawing to a close. Steepler had plans to diversify into consumer electronics, intending to market products like DVD players under the Dendy brand. However, these plans were derailed when Steepler won a tender to automate the State Duma. The company subsequently faced opposition from the Federal Agency of Government Communications and Information, as well as assassination attempts on its employees. As a result, Steepler lost its government contracts and filed for bankruptcy in 1996. The Dendy division survived as an independent entity, despite its working capital being tied up in Steepler's accounts. It faced significant challenges, initially relying on credit from suppliers. When this option was exhausted, Dendy was forced to sell only existing inventory for several months. The company ceased operations during the 1998 Russian financial crisis.

Estimates of Dendy console sales in Russia vary widely, ranging from 1.5 to 2 million units, with some sources suggesting figures as high as 6 million. The console has attained nostalgic status among Russians who grew up in the 1990s, comparable to the cultural significance of Nintendo and Sega consoles in the United States, Japan, and Europe during the same period. Dendy became synonymous with TV-connected gaming consoles in Russia. It is credited with establishing the video game and console market in the country and fostering the first generation of Russian gamers. The console's popularity led to the emergence of counterfeit Dendy clones produced by other manufacturers. As of 2021, Dendy consoles have become collectible items among enthusiasts and remain popular in Russian retrogaming communities.

== Models ==
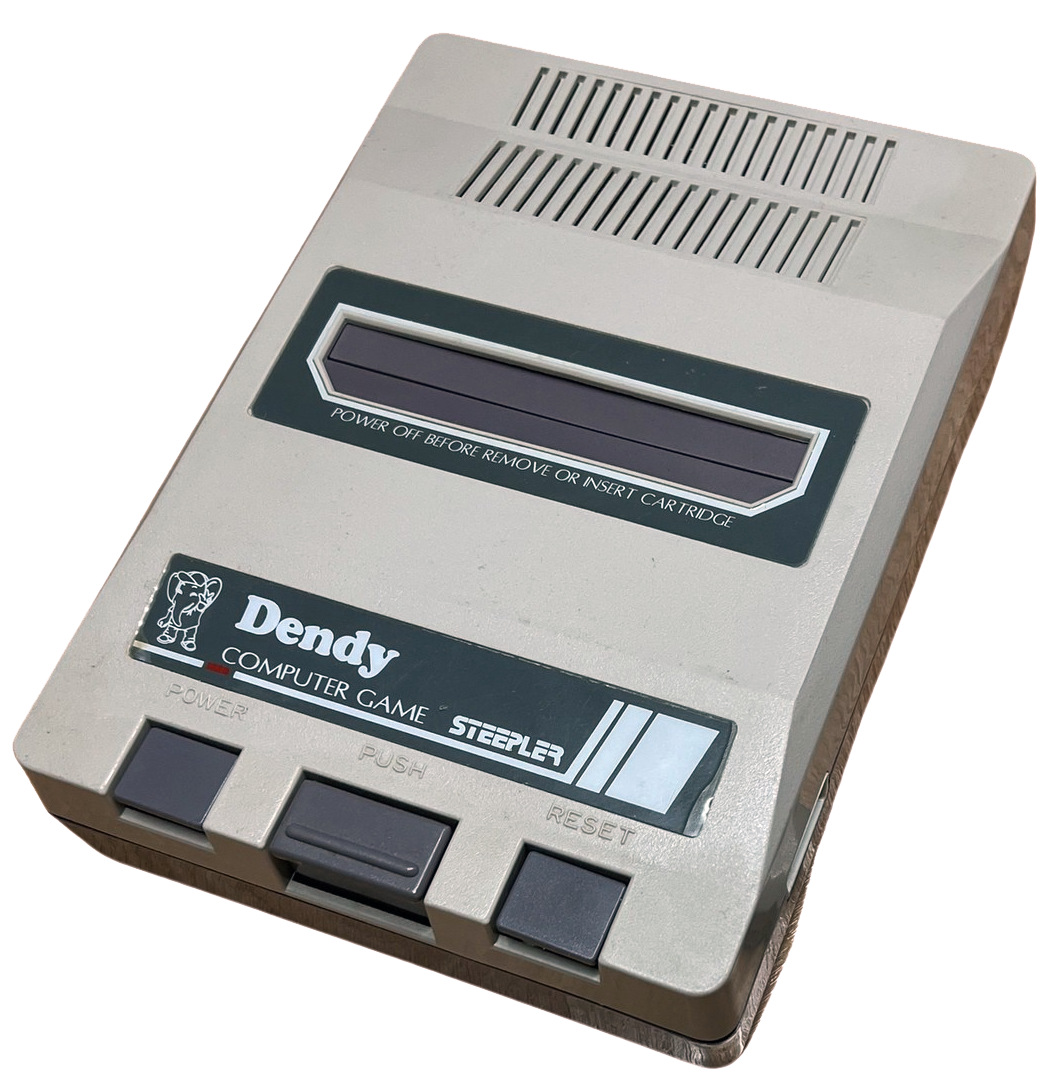
Dendy Classic

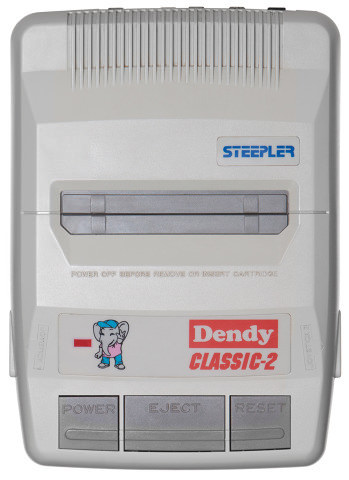
Dendy Classic II

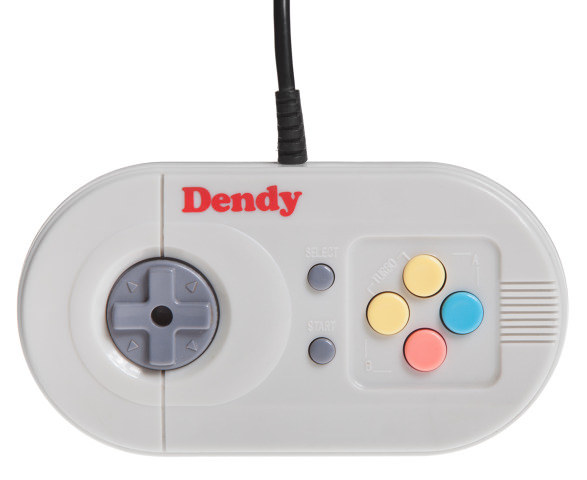
Dendy Classic II controller

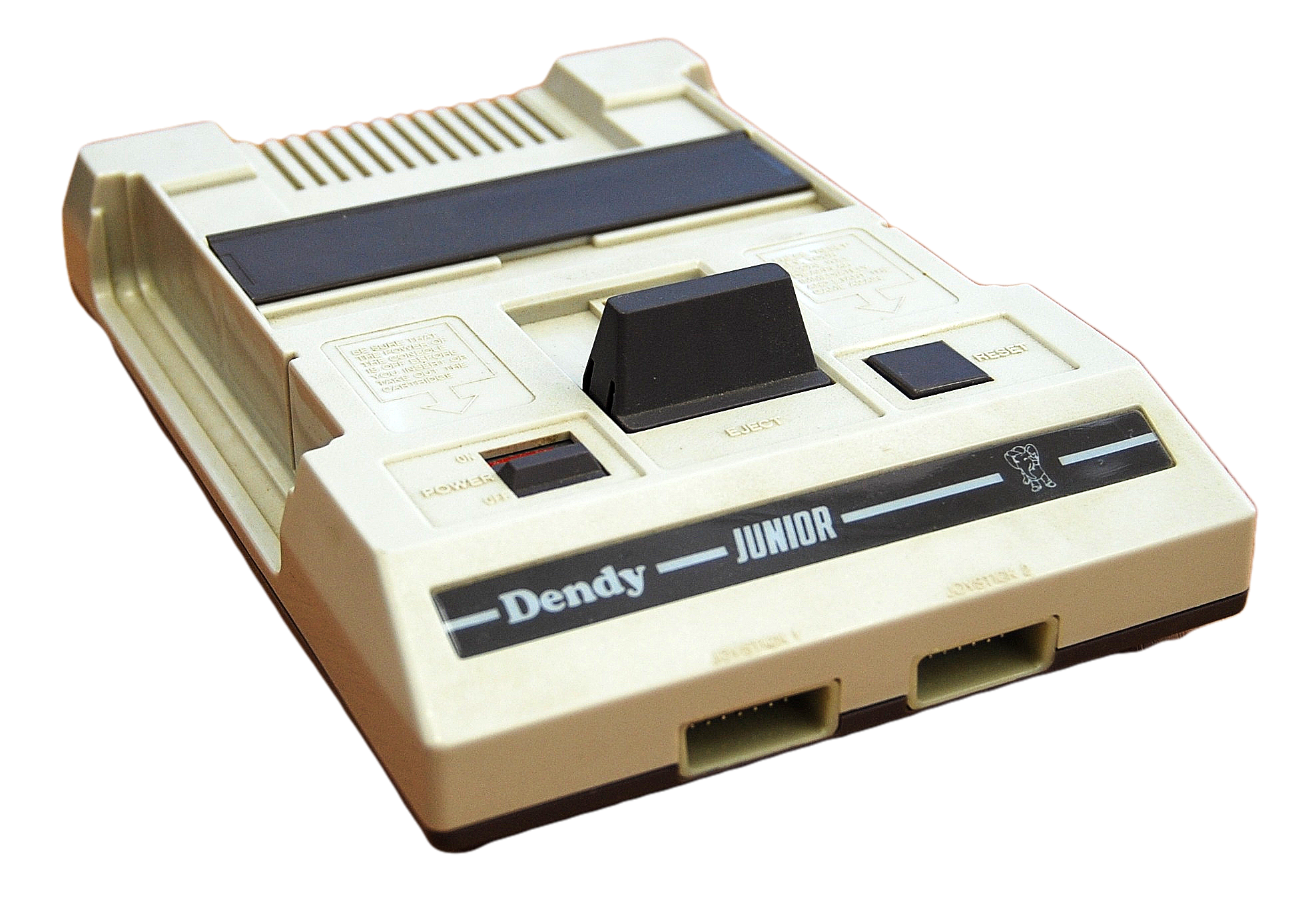
Dendy Junior

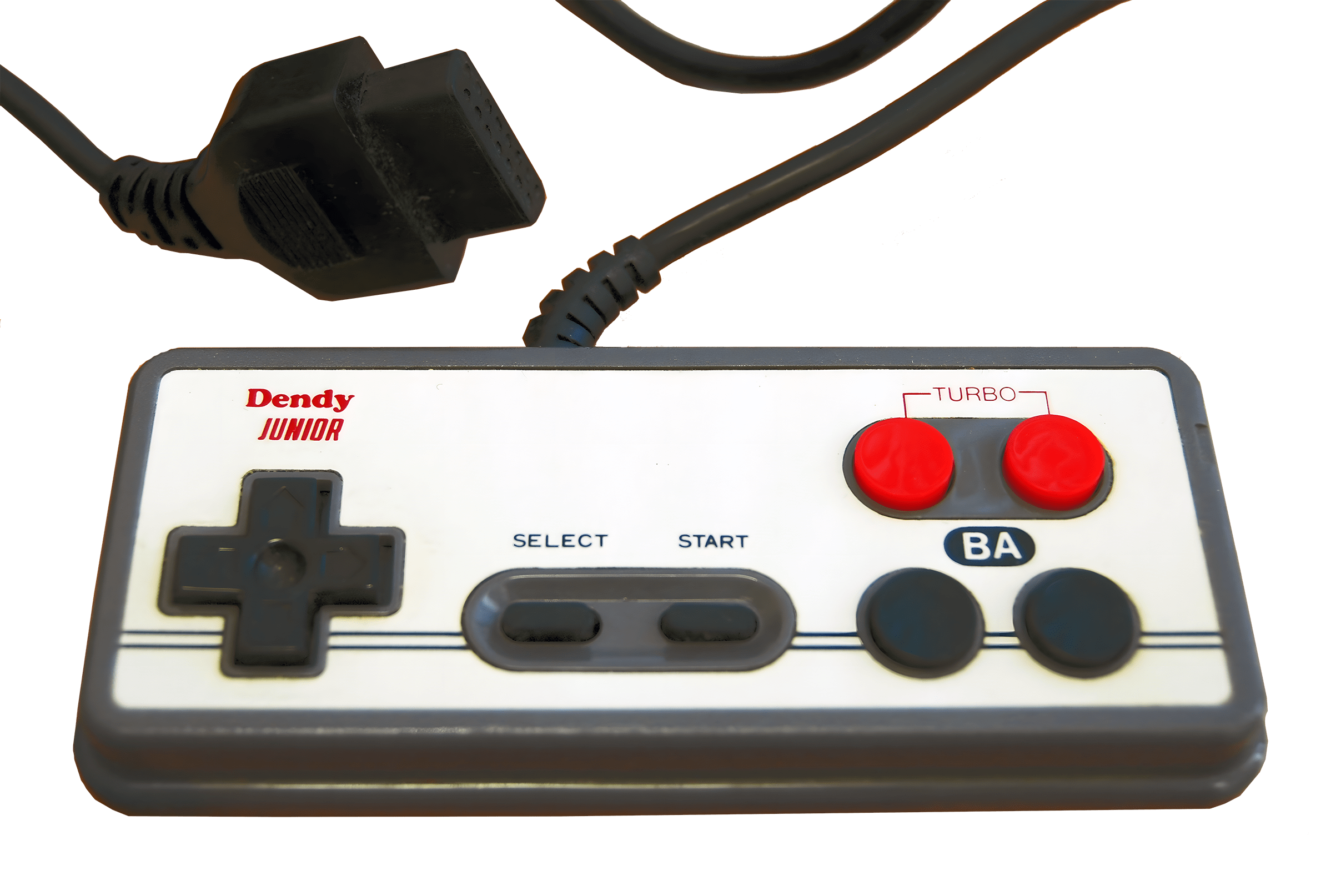
Dendy Junior controller

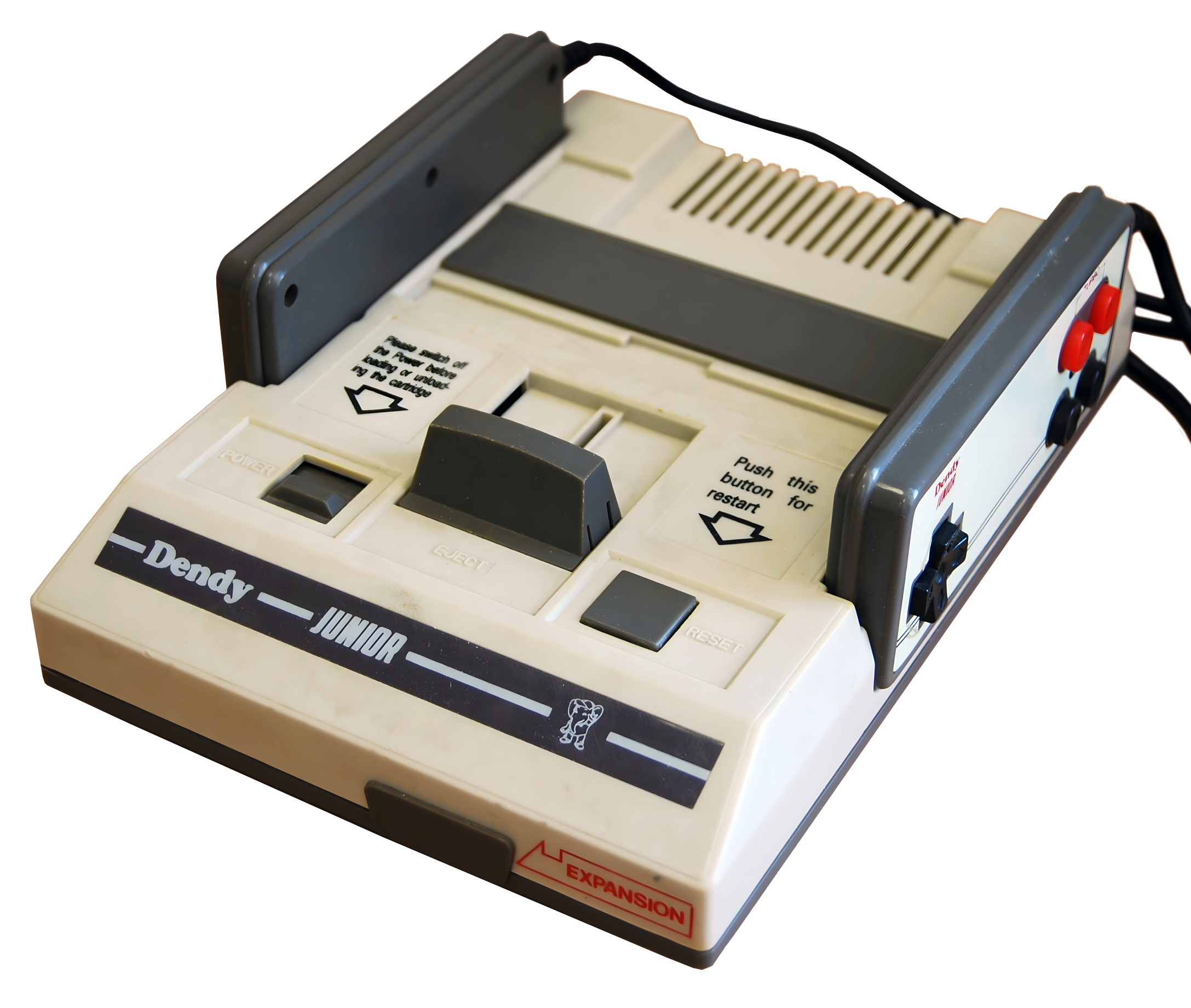
Dendy Junior IIP

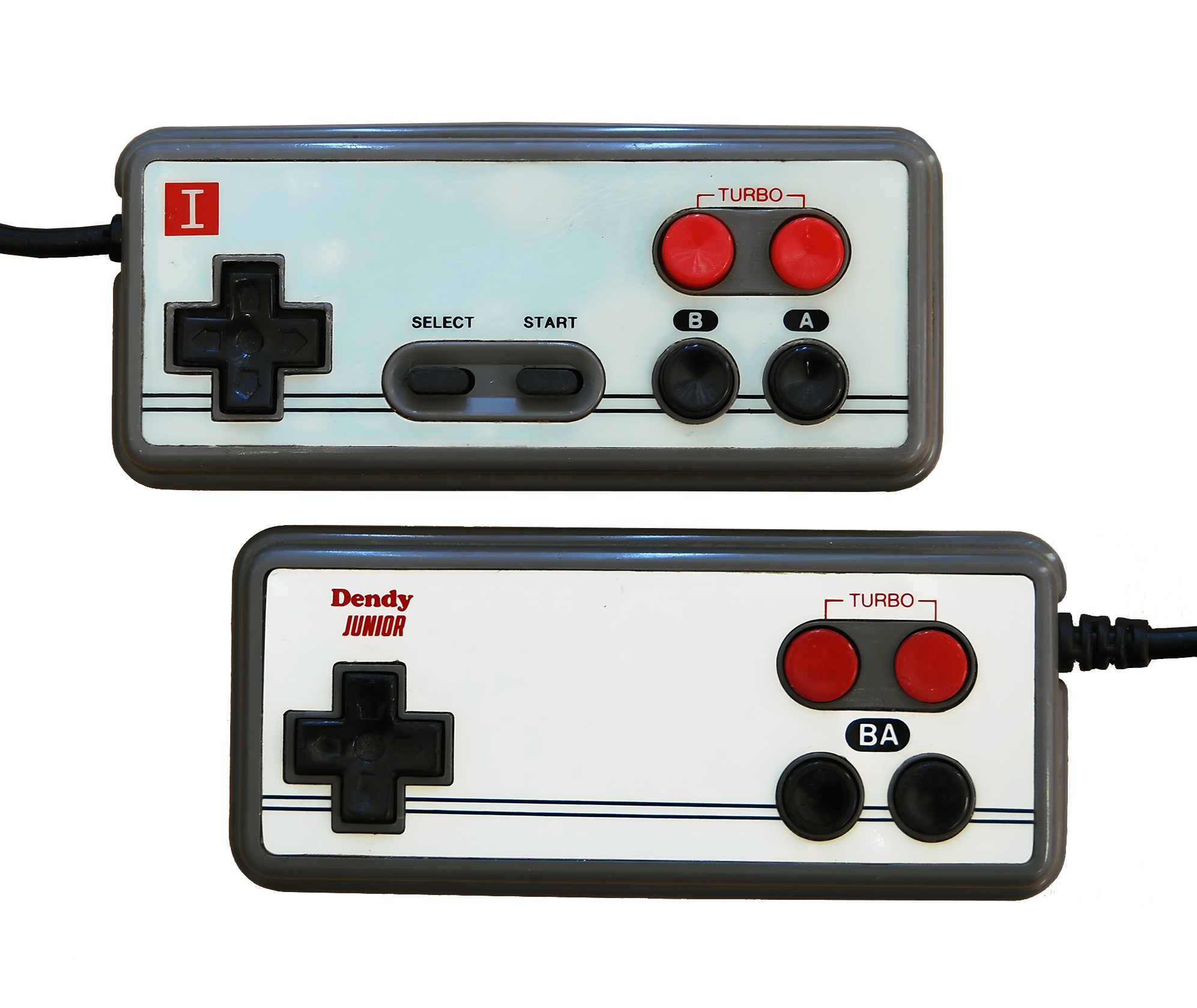
Dendy Junior II controllers

Dendy was manufactured in several variants, broadly categorized into two lines: the main Classic series and the budget-oriented Junior series. The first Dendy model was based on the Taiwanese Micro Genius IQ-501, which itself was based on the Twin Famicom from Sharp. TXC Corporation, a Taiwanese company, reimagined the Twin Famicom's design, creating a more compact console. The Russian company Steepler rebranded the IQ-501 as the Dendy Classic and launched it on 17 December 1992.

Steepler launched the Dendy Junior in the summer of 1993 as a more economical alternative to the Classic, aimed at younger children. The company's goal was to offer a console at a price point that would make it more attractive for wholesalers to source from Steepler rather than Chinese manufacturers. To achieve this, the Junior utilized cost-effective production methods, including a system-on-a-chip architecture. TXC Corporation custom-designed this model for Steepler to compete with inexpensive, low-quality Chinese clones. The Junior's appearance was based on the original Famicom, with packaging designed by Rustem Adagamov. With a wholesale price of $29, the Junior's release had the effect of increasing Classic model sales.

The next model in the series was the Dendy Junior II, which featured a rounded case similar to the original Junior, but with non-detachable controllers. The second controller lacked Start and Select buttons. Alongside this model, Steepler released the Dendy Junior IIP, which included a light gun resembling the NES Zapper and a multi-game cartridge. Following the Junior II, Steepler introduced the Dendy Junior IVP, skipping the Junior III designation. This decision was made after unknown competitors released a modified version of the Junior II under the Junior III name. To differentiate their product, Steepler launched the Junior IVP in black, using less expensive plastic and bundling it with a light gun modeled after the Beretta M9.

The Dendy Classic II, based on the Micro Genius IQ-502, was the final model in the series. It featured a new rounded design and updated controllers. Despite its higher price compared to standard Junior versions, the Classic II saw limited consumer interest. Steepler also planned to release the Dendy Pro, based on the Micro Genius IQ-1000, which would have included one wired and one wireless controller. Savyuk described it to Kommersant newspaper as a console that would "provide worthy competition to the best Japanese 8-bit consoles." However, according to Savyuk, only a limited run of 1,000-1,200 units was produced, which sold poorly.

== Game cartridges ==
The game select menu for a "9999-in-1" multi-game cartridge. Note that there are only 5 unique games shown, the rest are repeats.

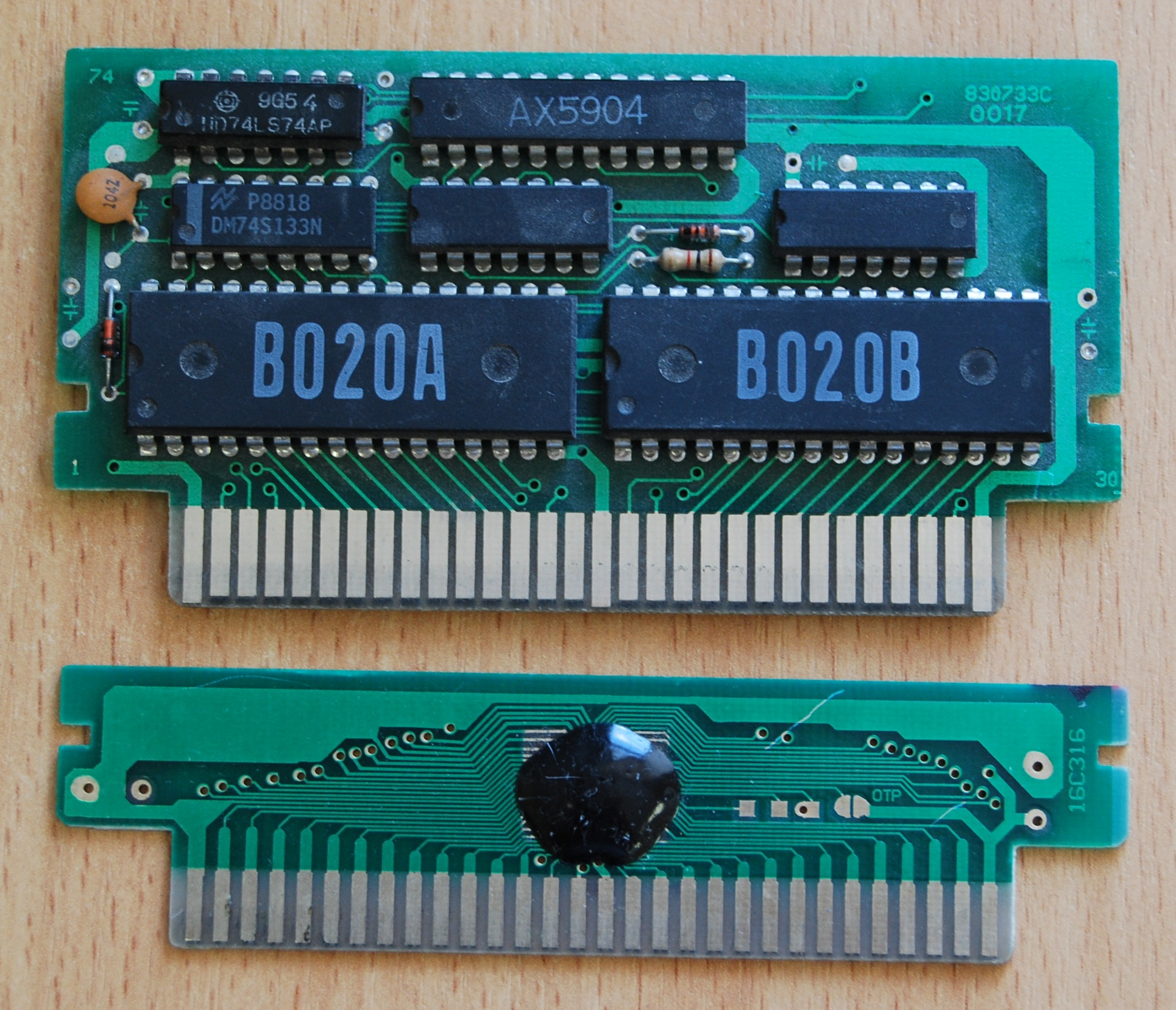
Cartridge boards without cases. The top one is an earlier version with integrated memory chips.

The Dendy, being a Famiclone, could run games originally designed for the Famicom. Additionally, a wide array of pirated NES game copies, custom-hacked versions, and low-quality "multi-game" cartridges were produced for the system. These multi-game cartridges, such as "99-in-1", often contained numerous non-functional games or slight variations of the same game. Initial Dendy cartridges were marketed in casings labeled "TV. GAME CARTRIDGE" and included dust protectors. A notably popular cartridge was the "Seagull Cartridge", purportedly offering "9999 games in 1". It featured a menu with animated seagulls and an 8-bit rendition of The Righteous Brothers' "Unchained Melody". During 1994–1995, AO "Elektronika" manufactured a series of cartridges that were half the height of standard cartridges and included Russian translations of games.

Dendy's game collection comprised a blend of titles from different regions, including American, Japanese, and European releases. The library was further expanded by unofficial games from Chinese developers. However, the absence of battery-backed memory in Dendy cartridges meant that games requiring save functionality, such as Final Fantasy, The Legend of Zelda and Metroid, were not available in the Russian market. As of 2021, original Steepler Dendy cartridges had become sought-after collectibles, with some titles commanding prices of up to tens of thousands of rubles in the collectors' market.

Many pirated games for the Dendy were created by combining elements from various titles and were often named after popular franchises, despite having no actual connection to them. Examples include Street Fighter V (made long before the real Street Fighter V), Contra 6, and Robocop IV. Many Chinese developers copied games from other consoles for the Dendy and other Famiclones, such as Street Fighter II, Mortal Kombat, and various variants of Disney Interactive games. One of the most famous counterfeit Dendy games is Somari, based on Sonic the Hedgehog for the Sega Mega Drive and developed in Taiwan. This version featured slower gameplay, incorporated elements from Sonic the Hedgehog 2, and replaced Sonic with Mario wearing Tails' shoes.

When copying official games, pirates often modified the code and removed company logos, frequently triggering copy protection mechanisms. This resulted in games becoming unbeatable or significantly more difficult. Notable examples include Bucky O'Hare, which became extremely challenging, and Teenage Mutant Ninja Turtles III: The Manhattan Project where the Shredder boss in the Technodrome level became invincible.

== See also ==
- Famiclone
- Pegasus
