= Dandelion Wine (film) =

- Based on: Dandelion Wine by Ray Bradbury
- Written by: Igor Apasyan; Aleksei Leontyev
- Starring: Innokenti Smoktunovsky, Liya Akhedzhakova, Vladimir Zeldin
- Music by: Shandor Kallosh
- Countries of origin: Russia; Ukraine
- Original language: Russian

Production
- Producer: Igor Apasyan
- Cinematography: Aleksandr Nosovsky
- Running time: 208 minutes

Original release
- Release: 1997

Dandelion Wine (Russian: «Вино из одуванчиков», romanized: Vino iz oduvanchikov) is a 1997 Russian TV film based on the 1957 book of the same name by Ray Bradbury.

It is the last film of Innokenti Smoktunovsky, released after his death.

== Cast ==
- Innokenti Smoktunovsky
- Andrei Novikov
- Sergei Kuznetsov
- Vsevolod Polishchuk
- Liya Akhedzhakova
- Yevgeni Gerchakov
- Lev Perfilov
- Lidiya Dranovskaya
- Vera Vasilyeva
- Vladimir Zeldin
- Sergei Suponev
