= Velikiy Drakon =

Defunct Russian video game magazine

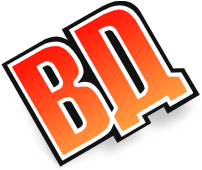
- Editor: Valery Polyakov
- Categories: Video games
- Frequency: Monthly
- Publisher: Video-Ace
- Founder: AST publishing house Russian: Издательство АСТ
- First issue: 1993–1995 (as Video-Ace Dendy); 1995–2004 (as Velikiy Drakon)
- Final issue Number: Nov. 2003; 65
- Company: KAMOTO
- Country: Russia
- Based in: Moscow
- Language: Russian
- Website: http://www.greatdragon.ru/ http://www.gdragon.ru/ (defunct)
- ISSN: 0868-5967

Velikiy Drakon (Russian: Великий Dракон lit. "Great Dragon") (Note: The magazine is also commonly known as Великий Дракон, G.Dragon, or either of its two initialisms, ВD or ВД.) is a defunct Russian video game magazine initially launched as Video-Ace Dendy (Russian: Видео-Асс Dendy) in 1993. The magazine was Russia's first wholly video-game-oriented magazine, and it was launched in order to meet the needs of Russian gamers, the majority of whom were just beginning to experience home console games as a medium as a result of the 1992 introduction of the Dendy home console. Aimed at young gamers, and characterized by its raw and artless coverage of illegal pirate games alongside legitimate (or at least legally grey) import games, Video-Ace Dendy covered all console systems that had penetrated into the Russian market until mid-1995, when the magazine split to form Velikiy Drakon which would cover only 16-bit and more advanced consoles. Video-Ace Dendy was phased out of publication within a year. As Velikiy Drakon, the magazine improved production quality greatly by outsourcing printing to Finland, and it survived until 2004 when the parent company folded under pressure from competitors including Strana Igr. Several former writers for Velikiy Drakon took up work with Strana Igr, and a small number of them helped found a fan-based production, GDD: Great Dragon's Dale, which produced a handful of issues before going defunct in late 2010.

== History ==
The Dendy logo designed by Ivan Maximov was used for Video-Ace Dendy and later Velikiy Drakon despite Steepler pulling its funding in 1995.

The launch of Video-Ace Dendy in 1993 came at a time when Russian markets were for the first time experiencing video game sales similar to those experienced by Western countries in the post-1983 video game revival. With the collapse of the Soviet Union and the subsequent raise of capitalism, Chinese manufacturers brought the Dendy home console (an unlicensed Nintendo Entertainment System hardware clone) to Russian gamers and before long sales were reaching 100,000 units per month. In this economic climate, conditions were just right for the emergence of video game journalism and the first 24-page issue of Video-Ace Dendy would mark Russia's first foray into magazines devoted solely to video games and video game culture.

The 24-page format was followed for the first 5 issues - a period during which the nascent company struggled to meet publication deadlines and financial obligations. Due to financial pressures, the magazine formed marketing alliances with and became sponsored by Dendy manufacturer, Steepler, and by the 6th issue (in March 1994) the magazine outsourced its printing duties to a Finnish company, doubling in size to 50 pages. With the arrival of imported 16-bit systems in Russia, the magazine also broadened its focus to cover systems including the Mega Drive, and expanded to accommodate its growing "Fun Club" section - a section devoted to fan letters, fan art, and competitions for the readers.

In the eighth issue (May 1994) a new author appeared under the pseudonym "Great Dragon". Subsequently, his alter-ego became a virtual character and unofficial mascot of the publication. By the 12th issue (October 1994) the magazine again doubled in size to 100 pages allowing yet more video game coverage as well as the addition of serialized comics, gossip and rumor sections, and several more fan-oriented sections. Between the 13th and the 18th issues, writing staff struggled with which direction to take the magazine, simultaneously releasing both a shorter version of Video-Ace Dendy and a lengthier Velikiy Drakon. Although discussions took place concerning whether or not to devote Velikiy Drakon entirely to coverage of the Super NES or entirely to coverage of the Mega Drive, a compromise was settled on where the magazine's coverage would be split exactly in half between these platforms.

The 18th issue of Video-Ace Dendy was a 2-part issue and would be its last as the 8-bit coverage was dropped and attention switched to the 16-bit and 32-bit era and beyond. Dendy manufacturer, Steepler, responded by pulling its funding of the magazine, but Velikiy Drakon was allowed to continue using the Dendy elephant mascot. As Velikiy Drakon established itself during the next few issues, the magazine added a "Picture Gallery" section and a "Fun-Club Competition" (Issue 19, August 1995), and a crossword puzzle section (Issue 20, October 95). The magazine also began to release short Drakon Plus (Russian: Dракон плюс) supplementals of fewer than 20 pages, and released a number of books detailing ratings for different games reviewed in the past.

The magazine would run for another several years producing 65 issues in total by 2003 and finally the publisher closed its doors in 2004 as stiff competition from competitor magazines drove the magazine to bankruptcy. Former Velikiy Drakon staff writers went their various ways with a number taking up work with competitor magazine, Strana Igr, and a small group helping to found the fan-based production of GDD: Great Dragon's Dale, a spiritual successor of sorts. Work on GDD resulted in the publishing of a handful of issues before it too went defunct in late-2010. In April 2013 project restart on www.gdragon.ru.

The magazine remains notable today for being Russia's first video game magazine and it has gained a level of notoriety among fans who value its sincere and ingenuous coverage of third and fourth generation pirate cartridges, unlicensed multicarts, and illegal clone hardware. While early issues of the magazine have been noted to lack production quality, the later issues improved on this and expanded the magazine.

== Writing staff ==
Staff members of Velikiy Drakon magazine had amusing aliases. The following are some known members of Velikiy Drakon:

Alias	Staff member
Agent Kuper (Russian: Агент Купер)	Valerij Korneev (Russian: Валерий Корнеев)
Alexander Lapšev (Russian: Александр Лапшев)	C.J.C.
Alex Man	Aleksandr Buharov (Russian: Александр Бухаров)
Duck Wader	Il'â Fabričnikov (Russian: Илья Фабричников)
Eler Cant	Aleksandr Kazancev (Russian: Александр Казанцев)
Lord Hanta	Aleksej Požarskij (Russian: Алексей Пожарский)
Navi Kičto (Russian: Нави Кичто)	Ivan Otčik (Russian: Иван Отчик)
NTB	Aleksandr Kazancev
Tomba	Stepan Čečulin (Russian: Степан Чечулин)
Wren	Konstantin Govorun (Russian: Константин Говорун)

Non-aliased writing staff included authors like Vladimir Suslov (Russian: Владимир Суслов), Roman Eremin (Russian: Роман Еремин), and Maksim Alaev (Russian: Максим Алаев). In addition, the alias "G.Dragon" was used occasionally and the magazine made much sport of asking the readers who the mysterious G.Dragon really was. Several theories were floated throughout the course of the magazine's lifespan.
