= Till 16 and older... =

Russian television program

Till 16 and older... (Russian: До 16 и старше..., romanized: Do 16 i starshe) was a television program of the first program of the Soviet Central Television and the Channel One Russia, dedicated to the problems of young people, which was published in the 1983–2001 years.
