= Khotkovo =

Khotkovo (Russian: Хотьково) is the name of several inhabited localities in Russia.

Urban localities

- Khotkovo, Moscow Oblast, a town in Sergiyevo-Posadsky District of Moscow Oblast

Rural localities

- Khotkovo, Kaluga Oblast, a selo in Duminichsky District of Kaluga Oblast
- Khotkovo, Oryol Oblast, a selo in Khotkovsky Selsoviet of Shablykinsky District in Oryol Oblast
- Khotkovo, Smolensk Oblast, a village in Duginskoye Rural Settlement of Sychyovsky District in Smolensk Oblast
