= Call of the Jungles =

- Title card
- Created by: Sergei Suponev
- Developed by: Ostankino Technical Center (1993–1995); KLASS! (1995–1996, 1998–2000); Zov (1997–1998)
- Presented by: Sergei Suponev; Petr Fedorov (1999); Nikolai Gadomsky (1999 – 2000)
- Opening theme: "Djungli Zovut"
- Composer: Viktor Prudovsky
- Country of origin: Russia
- Original language: Russian
- No. of seasons: 8
- No. of episodes: 200+

Production
- Producer: Sergei Suponev
- Editor: Yana Nevzorova
- Running time: 25 minutes

Original release
- Network: Channel One
- Release: 22 May 1993 – 4 October 2000

Call of the Jungles (Russian: Зов джунглей, romanized: Zov Djungley) was a TEFI-awarded Russian children's game show created and hosted by Sergei Suponev. Was aired on Wednesdays on Channel One. Later it was hosted by Pyotr Fyodorov Sr. for 1999, and Nikolai Gadomsky between 1999 and 2000. Music for the show was composed by Viktor Prudkovsky and Sergei Suponev performed the opening theme music "Djungli Zovut" (Russian: Джунгли зовут, lit. "Jungles Are Calling").

The contestants were split into two teams of four called "The Predators" and "The Herbivores." Each player was associated with an animal, printed on their T-shirt which included, for the Predators, a crocodile, lion, panther and a leopard. The Herbivores team consisted of an elephant, panda, koala and a monkey.
