= Pegasus (console) =

Home video game console

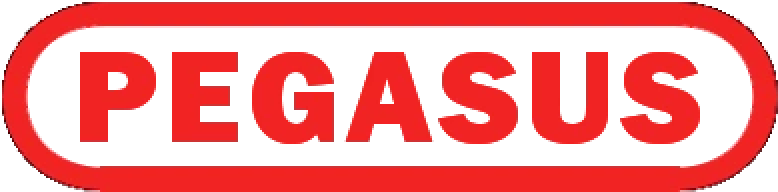

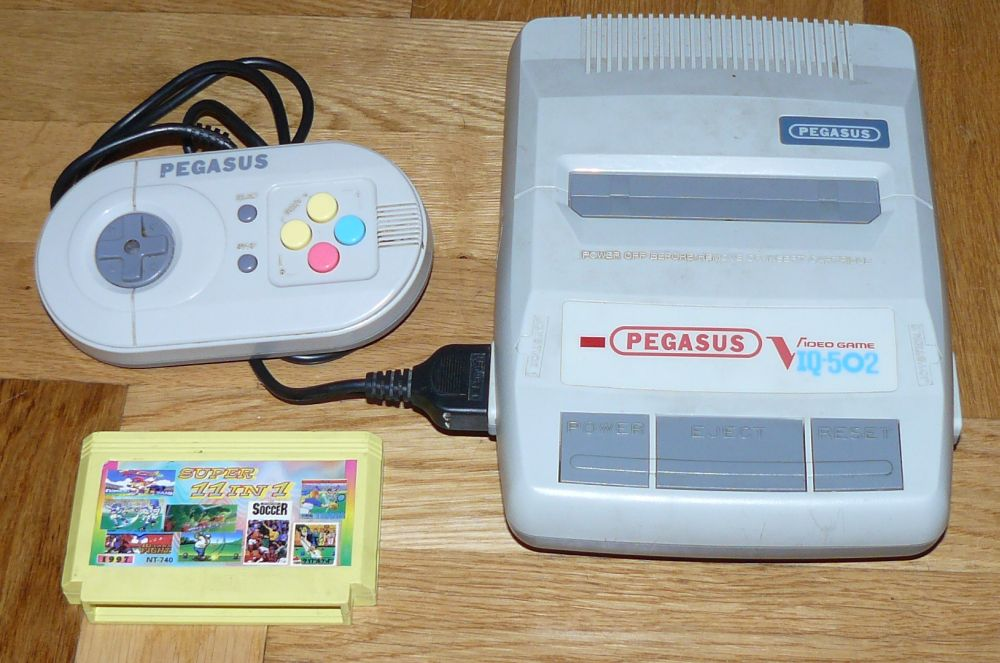
- A Pegasus IQ-502 game console with gamepad and cartridge
- Also known as: MT-777DX, IQ-502, Super Pegasus
- Product family: Famicom hardware clone
- Type: Video game console
- Released: POL: 1991
- Media: ROM cartridge (Nintendo 60-pin equivalent), floppy disk (if equipped with the FDS)
- CPU: MOS 6502 at 1.779 MHz or UMC UA6528P @ 5.37 MHz
- Display: PAL, 256×240, 25 colors (out of 64)
- Sound: Noise channel, PCM channel, 3 sound channels, external audio source via cartridge pins 48 and 49

The Pegasus is a Famiclone that was sold in the Czech Republic, Poland, Indonesia, Bosnia-Herzegovina and the Federal Republic of Yugoslavia during the early to mid 1990s.

The system itself did not include any built-in games, but was bundled with an unauthorized multicart labelled Contra 168-in-1, which contained 34 games, including Contra, Super Mario Bros., Tetris, Donkey Kong, Bomberman, Arkanoid, Popeye, and Pac-Man. Most of the games had a "trainer" feature, which allowed the player to adjust the number of lives, and even the starting level of the game.

== History ==
Pegasus was marketed by BobMark International, established in 1991 by Dariusz Wojdyga and Marek Jutkiewicz. Marek was originally a jeans vendor and came to Taiwan to buy jeans when he decided to market Famiclones to Poland due to the falling of the Polish złoty. The consoles were made by Micro Genius. English wording was used on packaging to boost sales.

The first model, called MT-777DX, became very popular between 1992 and 1993. BobMark released new consoles like the Super Pegasus (NES clone designed to look like the Super Nintendo) and the Pegasus Game Boy, which was a cheaper clone of the Game Boy. These don't have any game link, no headphones output and no diodes.

In 1994, due to changes in Polish copyright law, BobMark stopped publishing bootleg games and bought an official license to software published by Codemasters, Sachen and Western Technologies, distributing them in Asian cartridges. The most popular of these releases were the bundles Pegasus Golden Four and Pegasus Golden Five, which contained Codemasters games.

BobMark also released a new model called the IQ-502 with a unique design.

In late 1994, Nintendo started to sell their official products (Nintendo Entertainment System, Super Nintendo Entertainment System, Game Boy, etc) in Poland. At the same time, BobMark began to sell official Sega products, like the Sega Mega Drive, Game Gear and Master System, as part of their move to more legal venues. The Pegasus brand began to slowly lose its importance due to cheaper clones entering the market and new generation consoles while Poland began to strict enforce copyright laws after Nintendo began to build up its presence in the country.

BobMark tried to move to newer 16-bit consoles with the Power Pegasus, a Mega Drive clone bundled with official Sega games, but sales weren't as good as those of the 8-bit Pegasus. BobMark continued to sell Sega and Pegasus products until the late 1990s, when its founders, due to heavy losses, left the market and began to invest in Hoop drinks.

== Design ==
The system was manufactured in Taiwan and built to resemble the Nintendo Famicom. Pegasus, like most known NES clones, was compatible with 60-pin Famicom cartridges, and partially compatible with some NES games through the use of a special converter.

== Console ==
The typical retail set included the system and two detachable gamepads (with added "turbo" buttons for 4 in total; 6-button controllers also existed), power supply, RF cable, and audio-video RCA connectors.

=== Accessories ===
Customers could buy a light gun called Casel (similar in design to the NES Zapper) and a special joystick.

== Variants ==
In Indonesia, Spica sold the Pegasus MT-999DX, based on Micro Genius IQ-701.
