= Micro Genius =

Line of Famicom clone consoles

Micro Genius 小天才
- Type: Private
- Industry: Video games
- Founded: 1987
- Defunct: 1994
- Fate: Closed
- Headquarters: Taipei, Taiwan
- Products: Famiclones (late 1980s–mid 1990s); Video games (1991–1994)

Micro Genius (Chinese: 小天才; pinyin: Xiǎo Tiān Cái; lit. 'Little Genius') is a brand name used for Famicom clone consoles marketed in several countries around the world, particularly in areas where Nintendo consoles were not readily available, including the Middle East, Southeast Asia, South America, Eastern Europe, South Africa and East Asian countries excluding Japan and South Korea.

The name was initially used by TXC Corporation for its range of Taiwanese-made Famicom and Super Famicom clones, software and accessories. The name was later passed to other companies and remains in use today on rebranded Chinese Famicom clones and LCD games.

== History ==
The Micro Genius brand was started in 1987.

In some countries during the early 1990s, Micro Genius Famicom clones were the most popular game consoles, mirroring the popularity enjoyed several years earlier by Nintendo's official Famicom and NES in Japan and North America. However, they rarely reached markets where Nintendo was more recognisable, as they often infringed upon Nintendo's patents in those regions. It was only until the 1990s that Taiwan started to strictly enforce IP rights.

The Micro Genius was defunct by 1994.

In 2008, there was some sightings of Micro Genius-made consoles in North Korea.

== Consoles and accessories ==
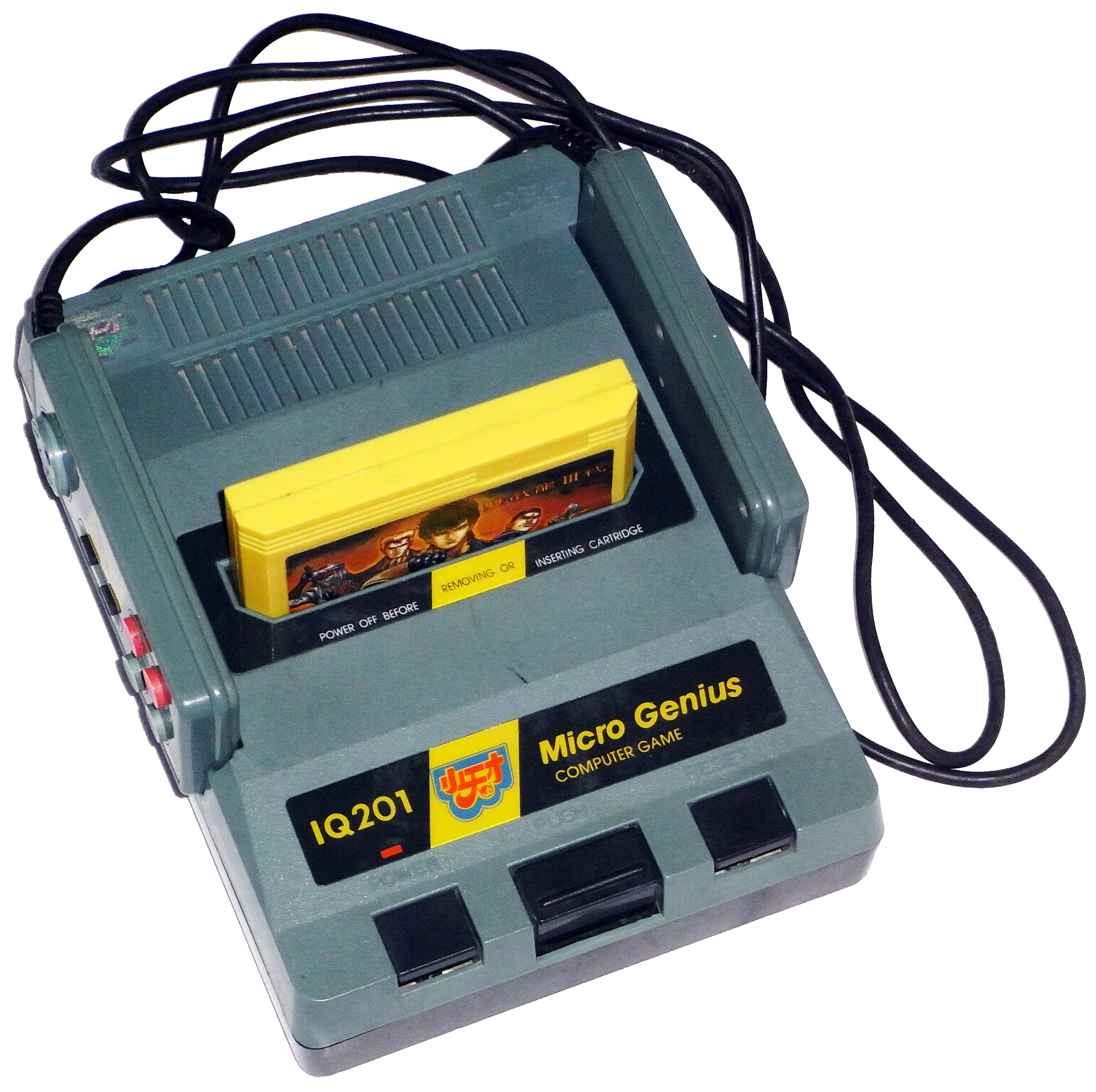
IQ-201 "Computer Game"

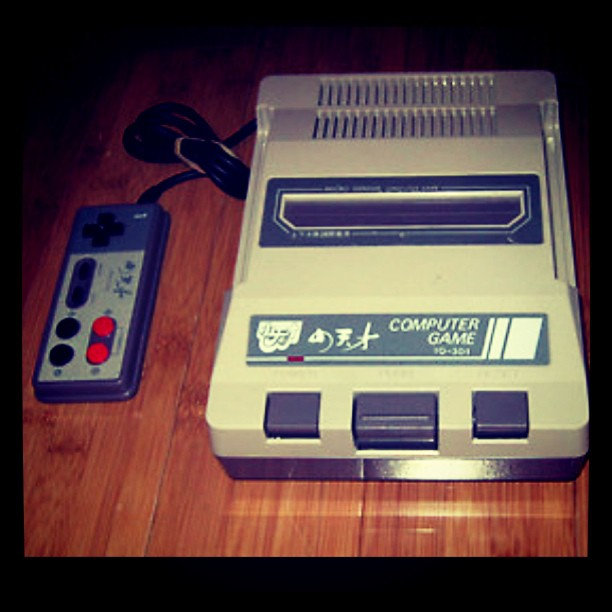
IQ-301 "Computer Game"

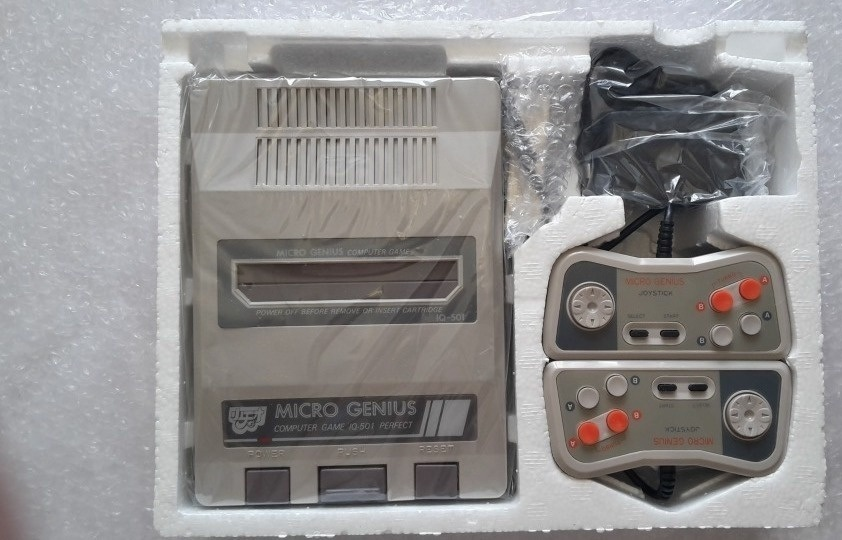
IQ-501 "Computer Game"

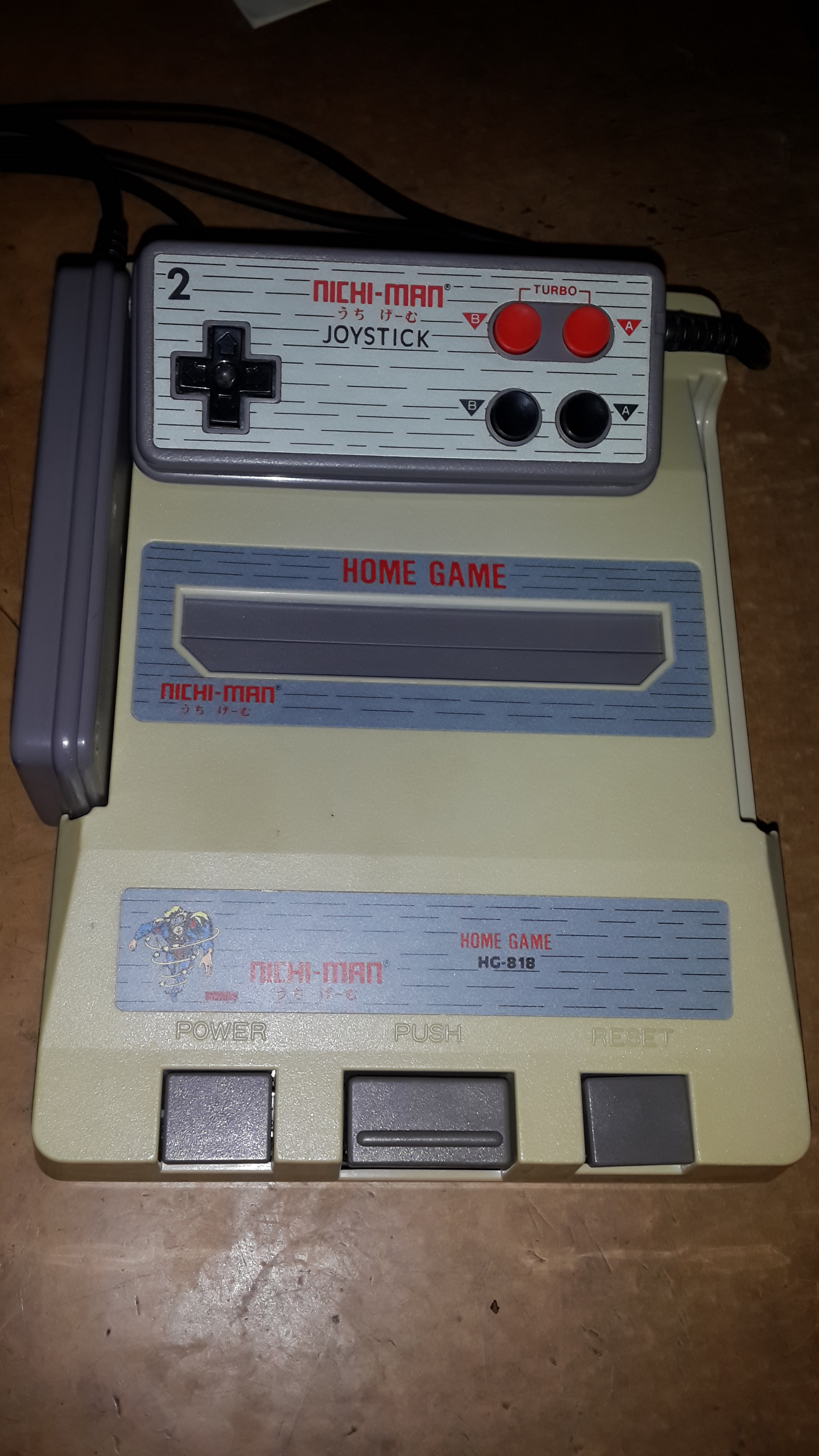
IQ-501 "Nichi-Man"

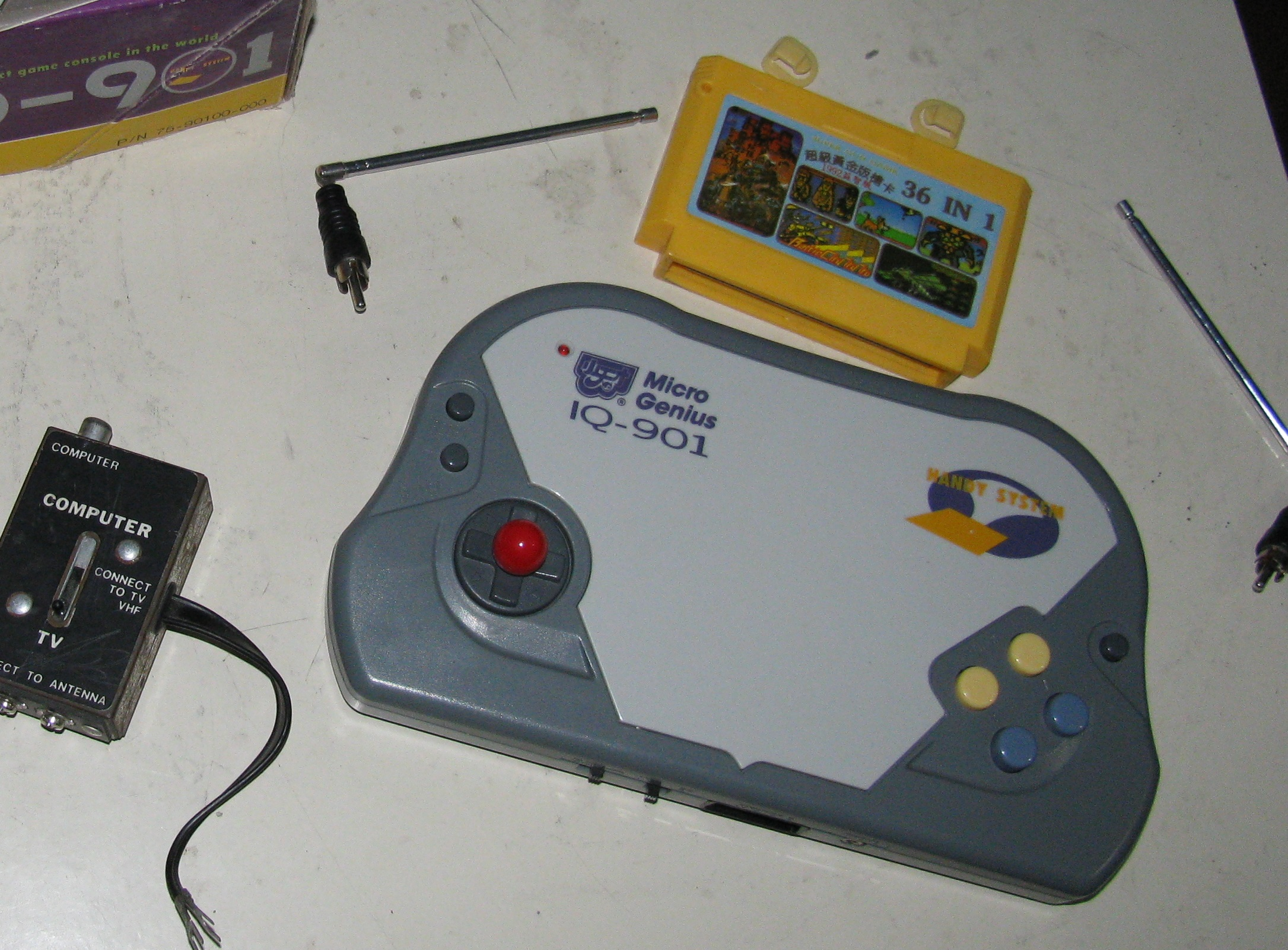
IQ-901 "Handy System"

There are several models of the Micro Genius, but the Micro Genius IQ-501 was particularly popular until the official introduction of competitors like Sega and Nintendo in the regions where it was sold.

The games came in form of 60-pin cartridges, identical to those of the Japanese Famicom, which were inserted from the top into a cartridge port, or in form of standard Super Famicom cartridges for SNES clones.

A standard Micro Genius console package came with two wired controllers and sometimes with light guns, which consisted of the Uzi Light Gun or the Machine Light Gun and the Infrared Light Phaser, a clone of the NES Zapper. Some models also used an RF antenna to transmit signals wirelessly to a receiver inserted in the TV. Later incarnations came with IR wireless controllers.

Micro Genius consoles include:

- IQ-201 – an early model resembling the Famicom, with hard-wired controllers.
- IQ-301 – similar to the IQ-201, with the addition of turbo switches.
- IQ-501 – introduces detachable controllers, sold as Dendy Classic in Russia and CIS, Nichi-Man in Colombia, Samurai Micro Genius in India.
- IQ-502 – sold as Dendy Classic II in Russia and CIS, Pegasus IQ-502 in Poland and Czechia, Video Game GT 3300 in Czechia, Super Bitgame in Argentina and Redstone in Iceland.
- IQ-701 – resembles the international Nintendo Entertainment System. Sold in Indonesia as Spica IQ-701.
- IQ-901 – an early handheld TV game. Sold as Handy System, and as MARgame in Italy.
- IQ-1000 – built-in infra-red receiver, comes with one wireless controller and one wired. Sold in Russia and CIS as Bitman 2 and in Indonesia as Spica IQ-1001.
- IQ-2000 – similar to the IQ-1000 but comes with two wireless controllers. Sold in Russia and CIS as Bitman Infra and in India as Samurai IQ-2000.

Accessories for other consoles were also sold under the Micro Genius brand, including lightguns and controllers for the original NES, and wireless controllers for the Mega Drive and SNES.

== Games ==
Most versions of Micro Genius are compatible with Famicom cartridges but require a 72-pin to 60-pin adapter to play NES games, although certain models were produced in both 60-pin Famicom and 72-pin NES versions. It was often sold with cartridges containing multiple games. The 60-pin Famicom versions also generally supported expansion audio chips such as Konami's VRC6 and VRC7 making them a more affordable alternative for those in Europe wanting to play Famicom games with expansion audio without making modifications to the console as long as they don't mind 50 Hz slowdown.

A series of original Micro Genius games, such as Chinese Chess and Thunder Warrior, was produced in both Famicom and NES format, but unlicensed copies of Japanese games remained more popular in the countries where the console was sold.

=== List of games ===
On the list, all Idea-Tek games were later re-released by the same TXC/Micro Genius.

No.	Title	Original release	Notes
1	F-15 City War	1990	Released by Idea-Tek.
2	Puzzle	1990	Released by Idea-Tek.
3	Chinese Chess	1991	1) Also known as Zhōngguó Xiàngqí. 2) In some versions the game is misspelled, credited as "Chinese Chese".
4	Creatom	1991	
5	Enjoyable Horse Racing	1991	1) Also known as 1991 Du Ma Racing (1991 Dǔ Mǎ Dàsài). 2) Released by Idea-Tek.
6	Mahjong Block	1991	1) Released by Idea-Tek; a Mahjong theme version of Poke Block. 2) The game was also released and published (with the addition of nudity) by Hacker International as AV Dragon Mahjang.
7	Poke Block	1991	1) Released by Idea-Tek. 2) In 1992, was re-released by TXC and published by American Video Entertainment as Stakk'M.
8	Rad Racket: Deluxe Tennis II	1991	Released by Idea-Tek.
9	Venice Beach Volleyball	1991	Released by Idea-Tek.
10	Xiǎo Mǎ Lì	1991	1) Released by Nei-Hu Electronics and distributed by Idea-Tek. 2) Re-released by TXC as Bingo.
11	Policeman	1992	Game similar to Bonanza Bros. by Sega.
12	Strike Wolf	1992	
13	Thunder Warrior	1992	1) Also known as Hōng Tiān Zhìzūn. 2) An adapted version was released by Gluk Video as Gluk: The Thunder Warrior.
14	3 in 1 Supergun	1993	3 games in 1: Clown, Snake Charmer, and Shooter.
15	Journey to the West	1994	1) Also known as Western Heaven (Xītiān Qǔjīng). 2) Developed by Chengdu Tai Jing Da Dong Computer Co.
