= National Toy Hall of Fame =

Hall of Fame in Rochester, New York

Coordinates: 43.1526°N 77.601543°W

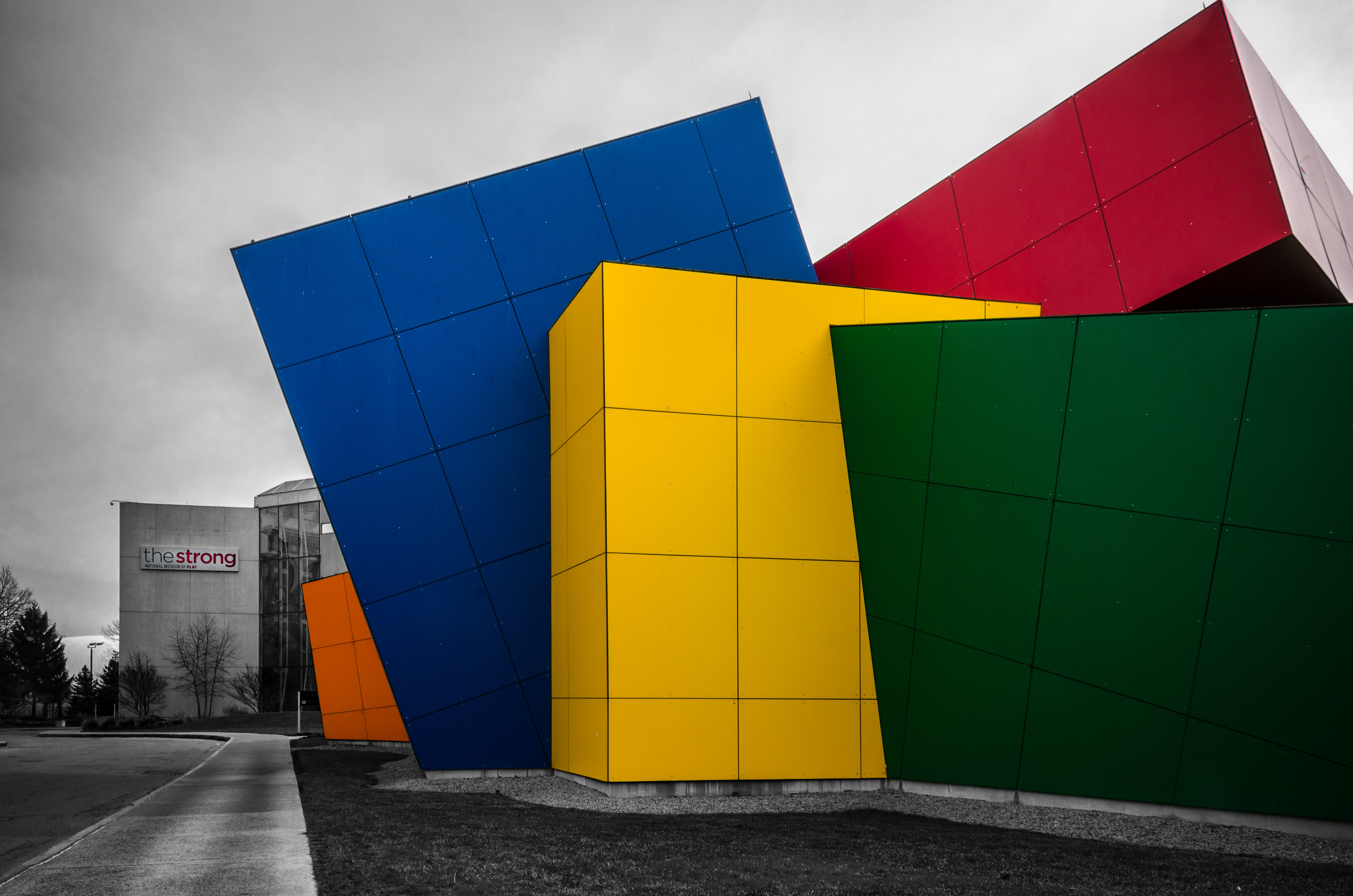
- Entrance to The Strong, location of the Toy Hall of Fame
- Established: 1998; 28 years ago
- Location: The Strong, Rochester, NY
- Type: Hall of Fame
- Collections: Toys
- Website: museumofplay.org/toy-hall-of-fame

The National Toy Hall of Fame is a U.S. hall of fame that recognizes the contributions of toys and games that have sustained their popularity for many years. Criteria for induction include: icon status (the toy is widely recognized, respected, and remembered); longevity (more than a passing fad); discovery (fosters learning, creativity, or discovery); and innovation (profoundly changed play or toy design). Established in 1998 under the direction of Ed Sobey, it was originally housed at A. C. Gilbert's Discovery Village in Salem, Oregon, United States, but was moved to the Strong National Museum of Play (now The Strong) in Rochester, New York, in 2002 after it outgrew its original home.

As of 2026, 95 toys have been enshrined in the National Toy Hall of Fame:

== Original inductees (1998-99) ==
The original inductees to the National Toy Hall of Fame were announced in November 1999. Students from nearby Willamette University protested (good-naturedly) when they learned that Mr. Potato Head and Barbie's friend Ken were not included.

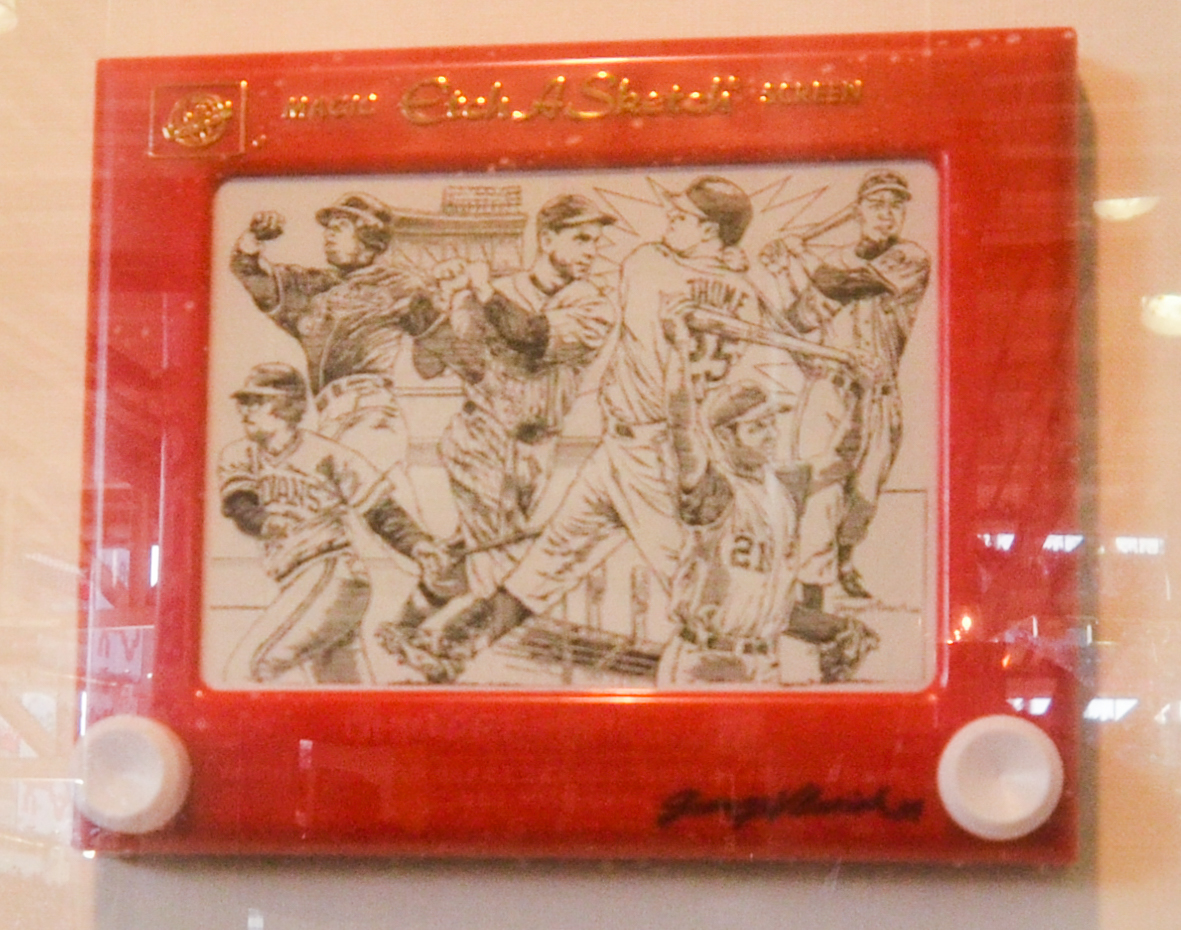
Etch A Sketch

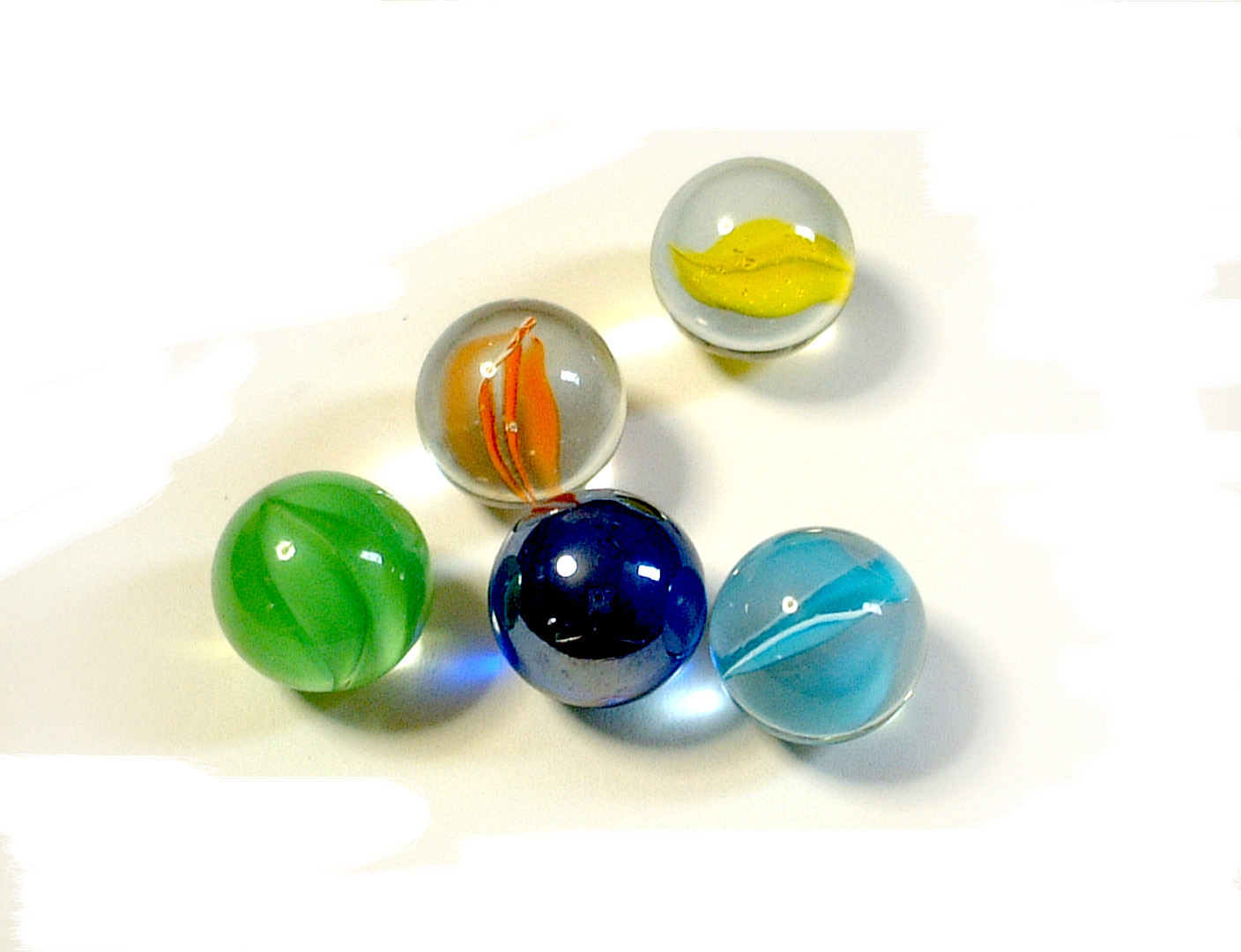
Glass-made marbles

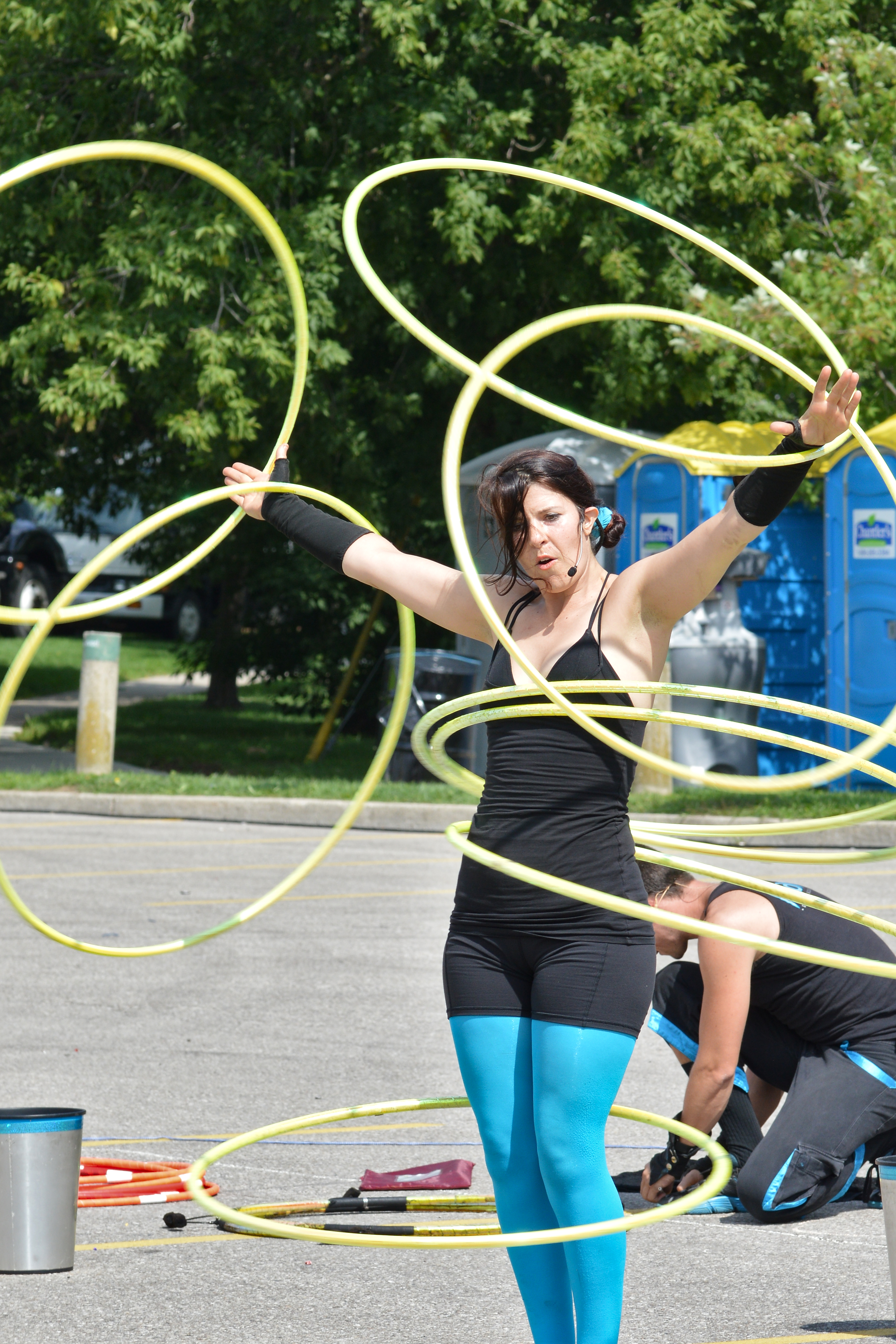
Hula hoops

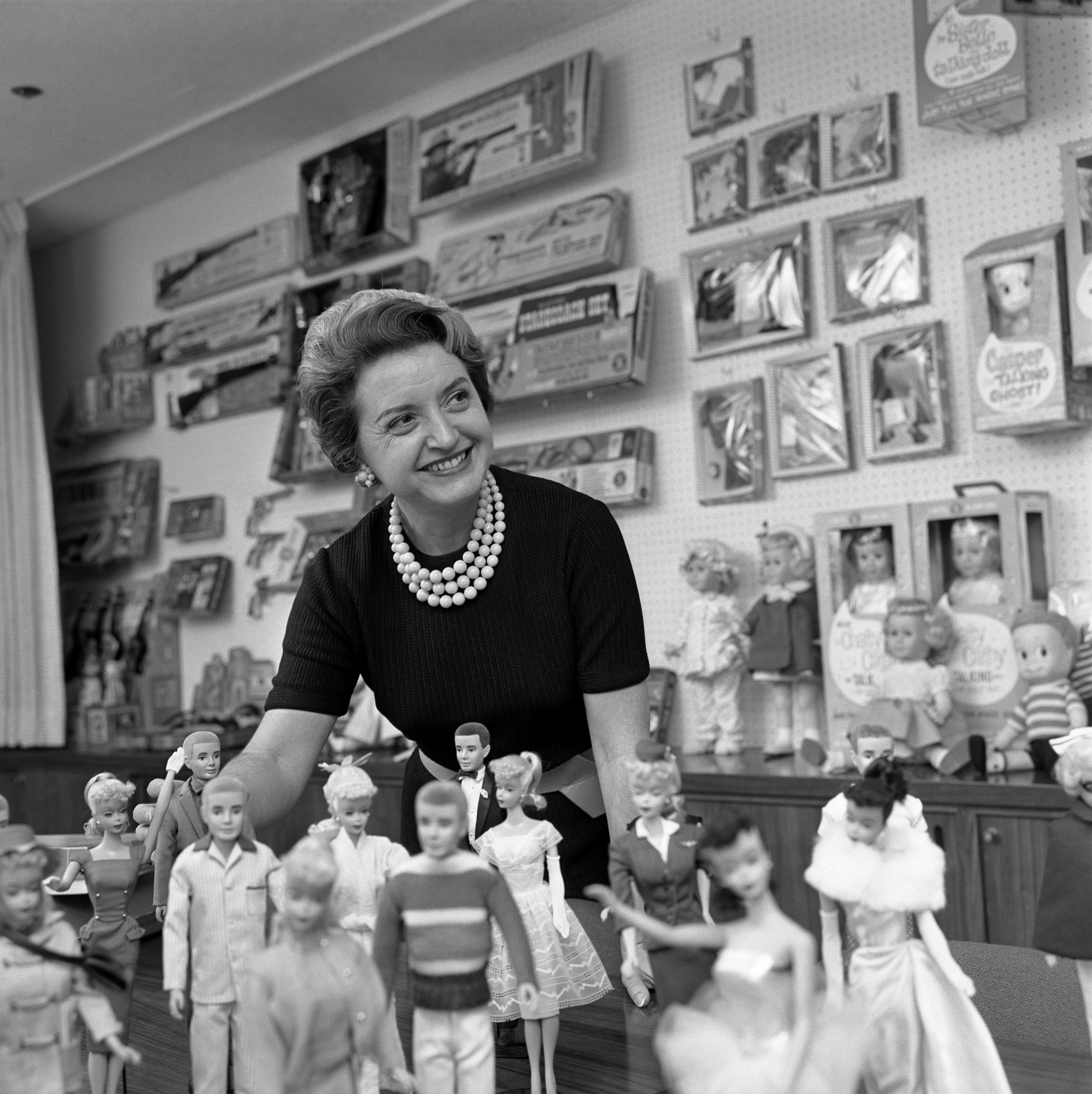
Barbie dolls and creator Ruth Handler

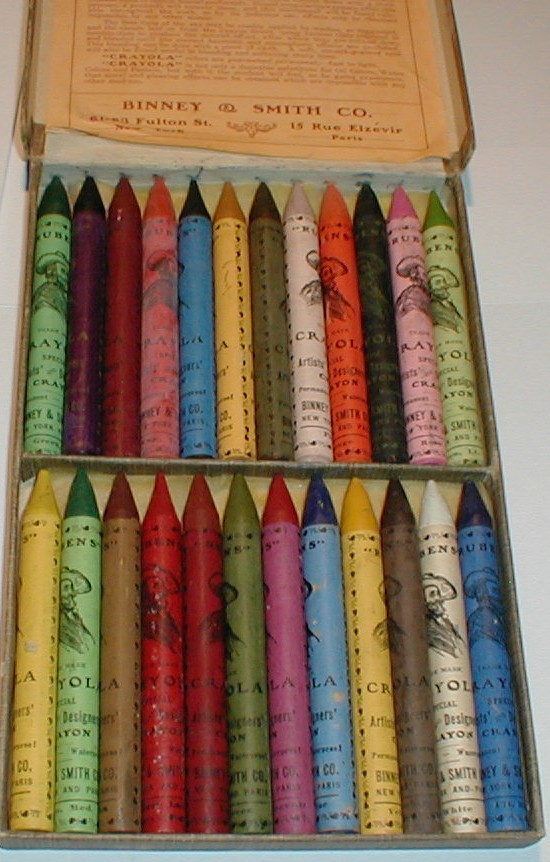
Crayola No. 500

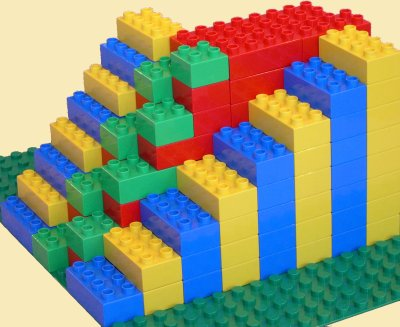
Lego pieces

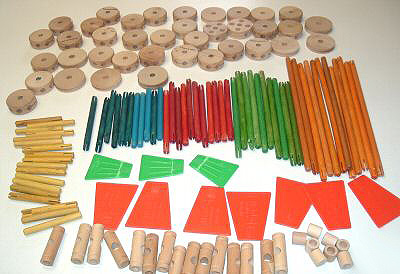
Tinkertoy pieces

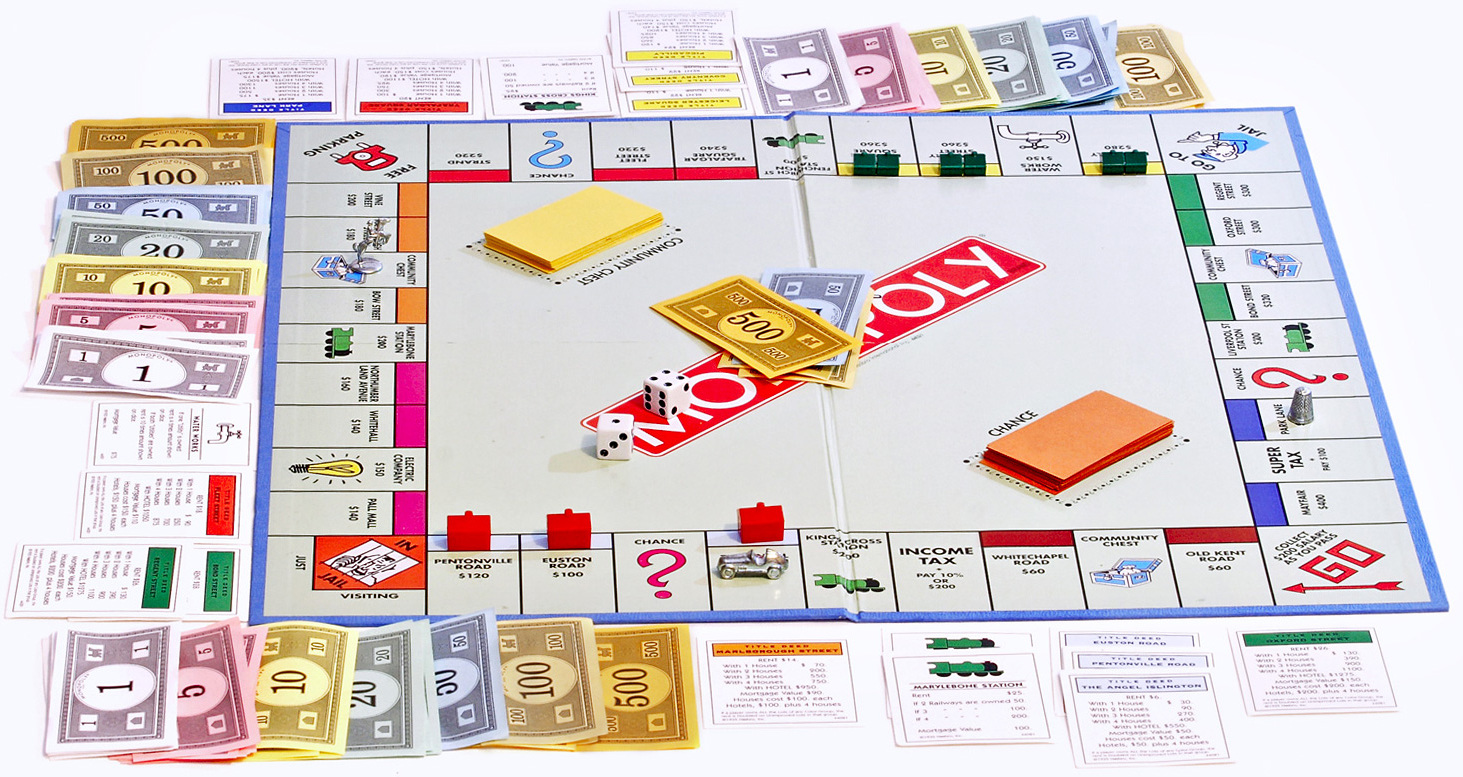
Monopoly board

1. Barbie
2. Crayola crayon
3. Erector Set
4. Etch A Sketch
5. Frisbee
6. Hula hoop
7. Lego
8. Lincoln Logs
9. Marbles
10. Monopoly
11. Play-Doh
12. Radio Flyer wagon
13. Roller skates
14. Teddy bear
15. Tinkertoy
16. View-Master
17. Duncan Yo-Yo

== 2000s ==
=== Class of 2000 ===
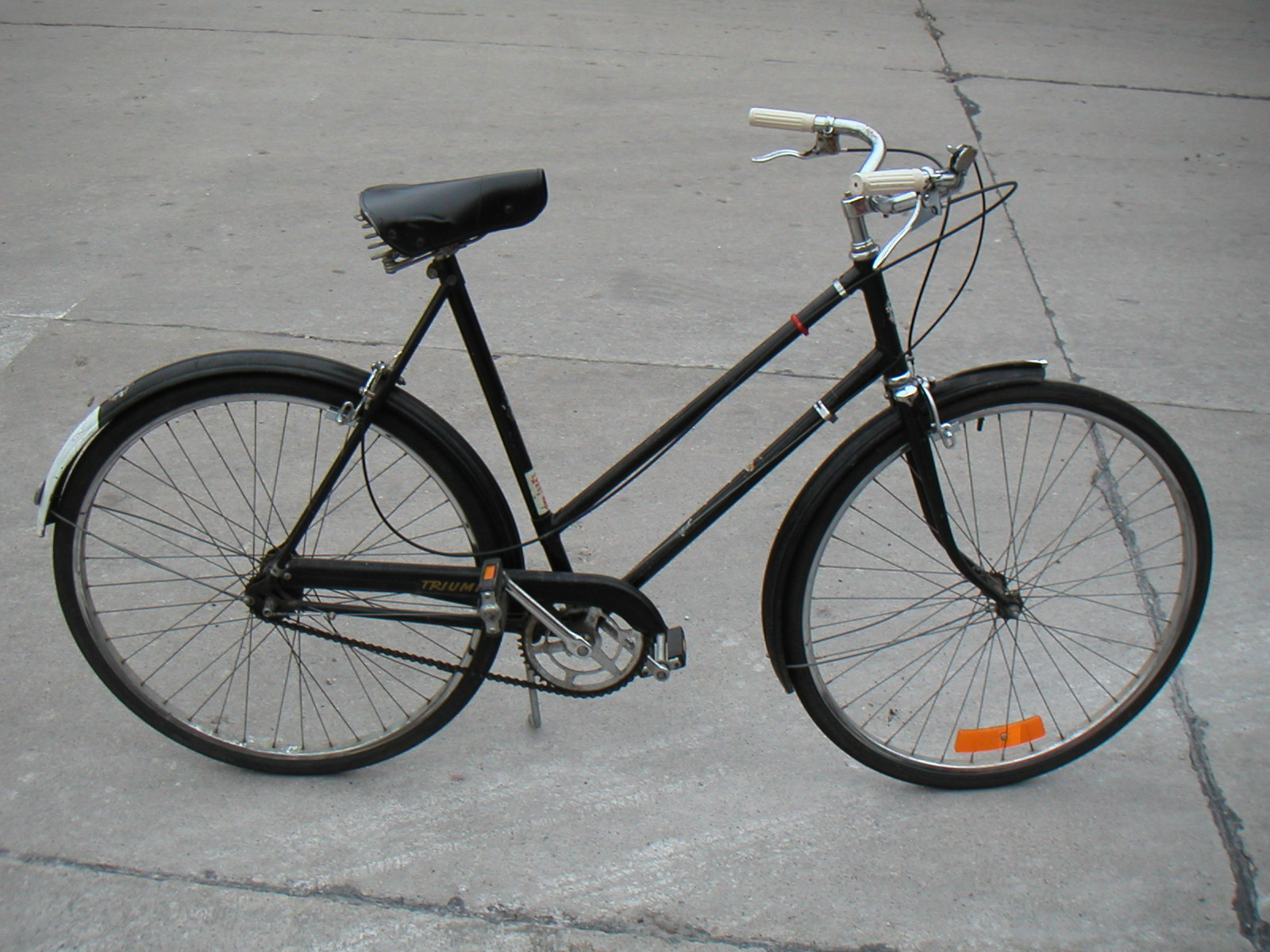
Triumph bicycle

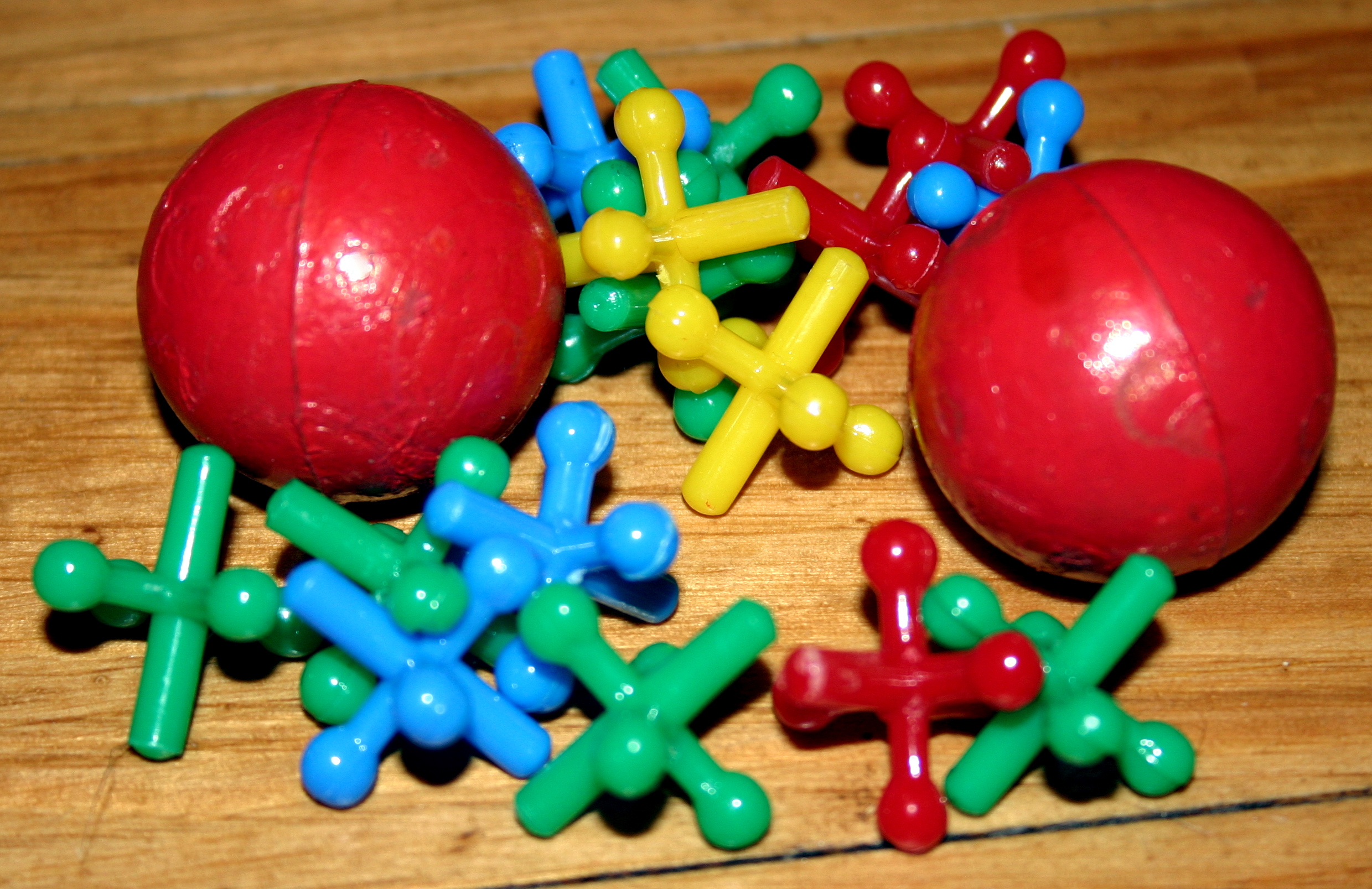
Knucklebones

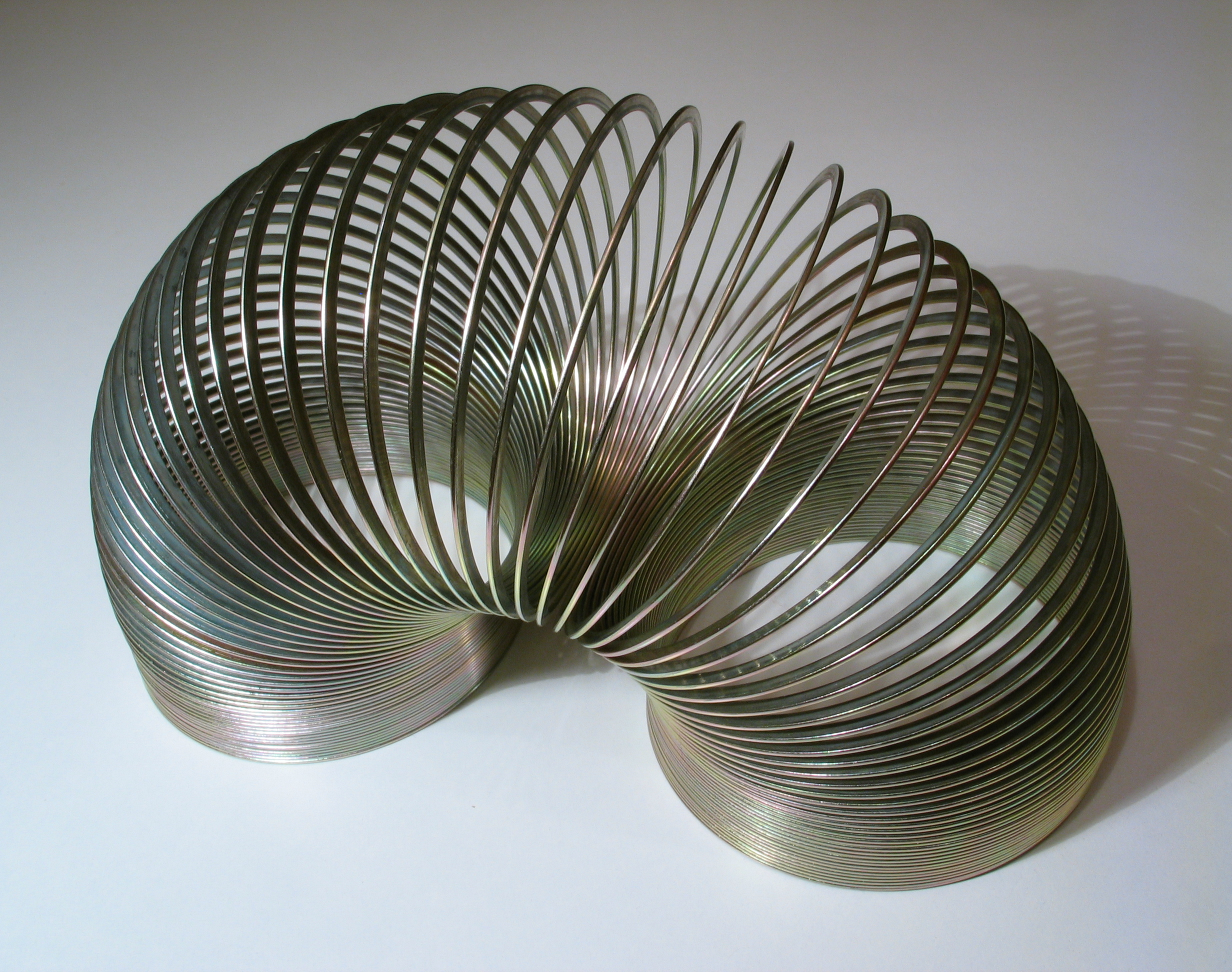
Metal Slinky

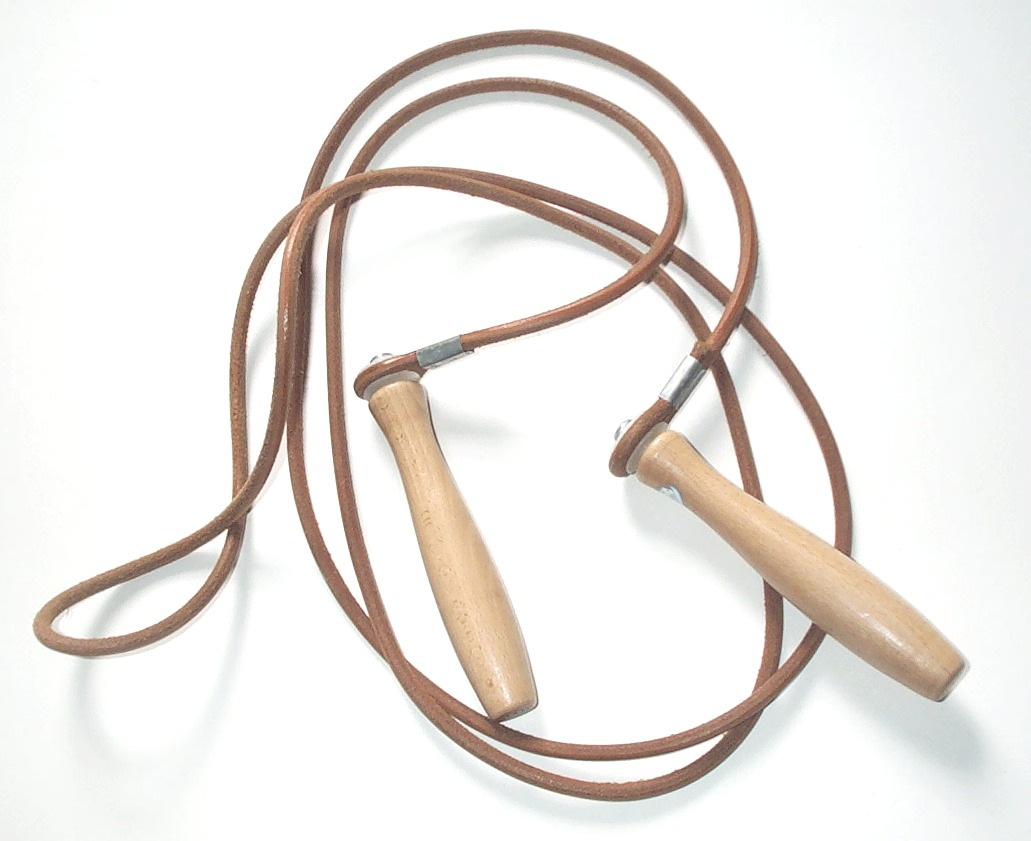
Jump rope

The following toys were added in 2000:

1. Bicycle
2. Knucklebones
3. Jump rope
4. Mr. Potato Head
5. Slinky

This year's selections were chosen from a field of 34 nominations by a panel of educators and civic leaders that included Sharon Kitzhaber, wife of Oregon Governor John Kitzhaber. Nominees rejected for the honor this year included G.I. Joe, the Nintendo Entertainment System, the soccer ball, Beanie Babies, the baseball glove and the cap gun.

=== Class of 2001 ===
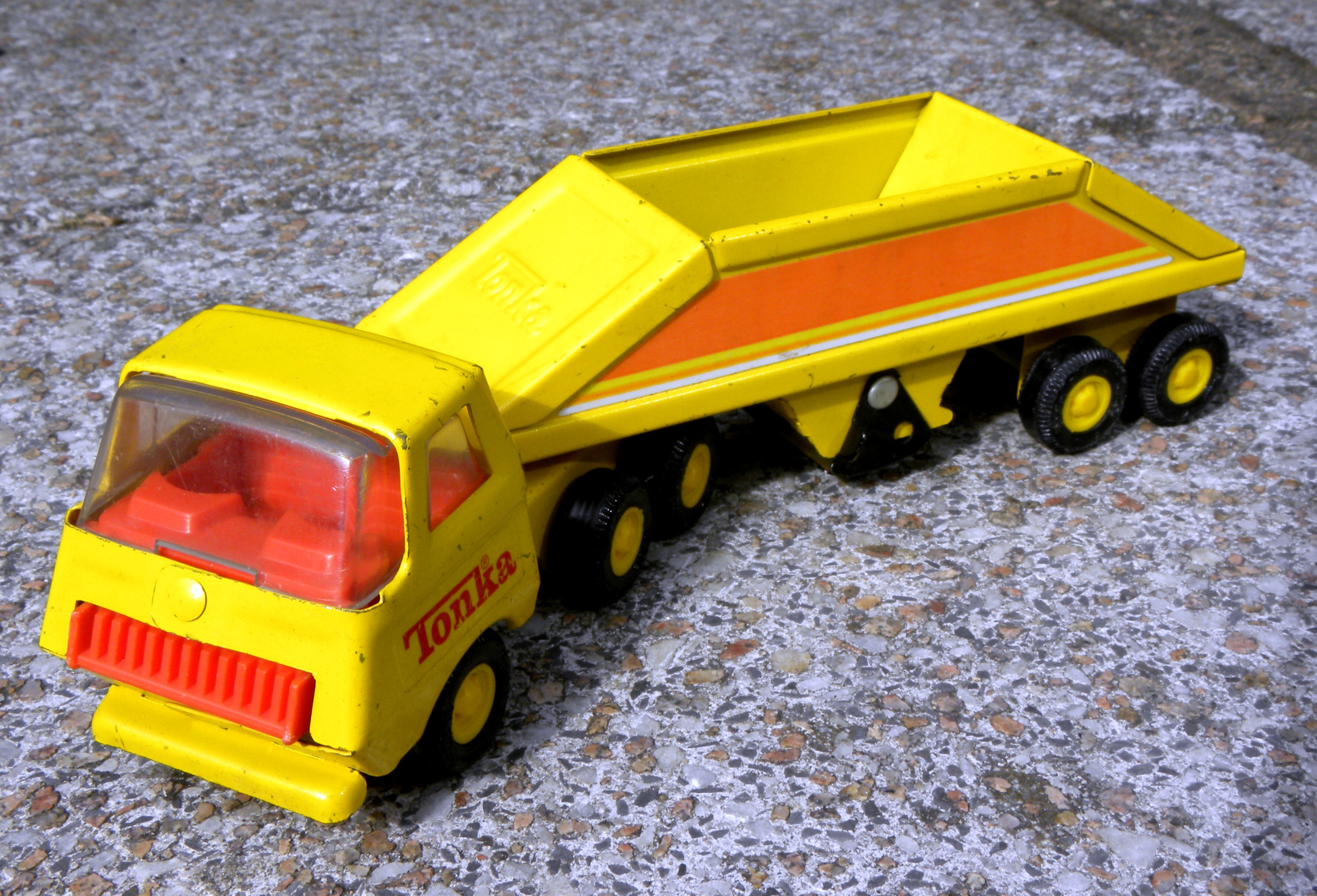
Old-style steel toy bottom-dump truck by Tonka

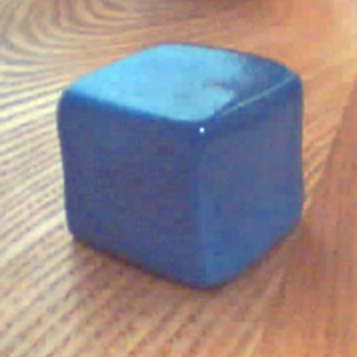
Silly Putty molded into a cube

The following toys were added in 2001:

1. Silly Putty
2. Tonka trucks

Both children and adults created a list of 82 nominees over the past year. A national panel of distinguished educators and civic leaders choose two toys for induction this year.

=== Class of 2002 ===
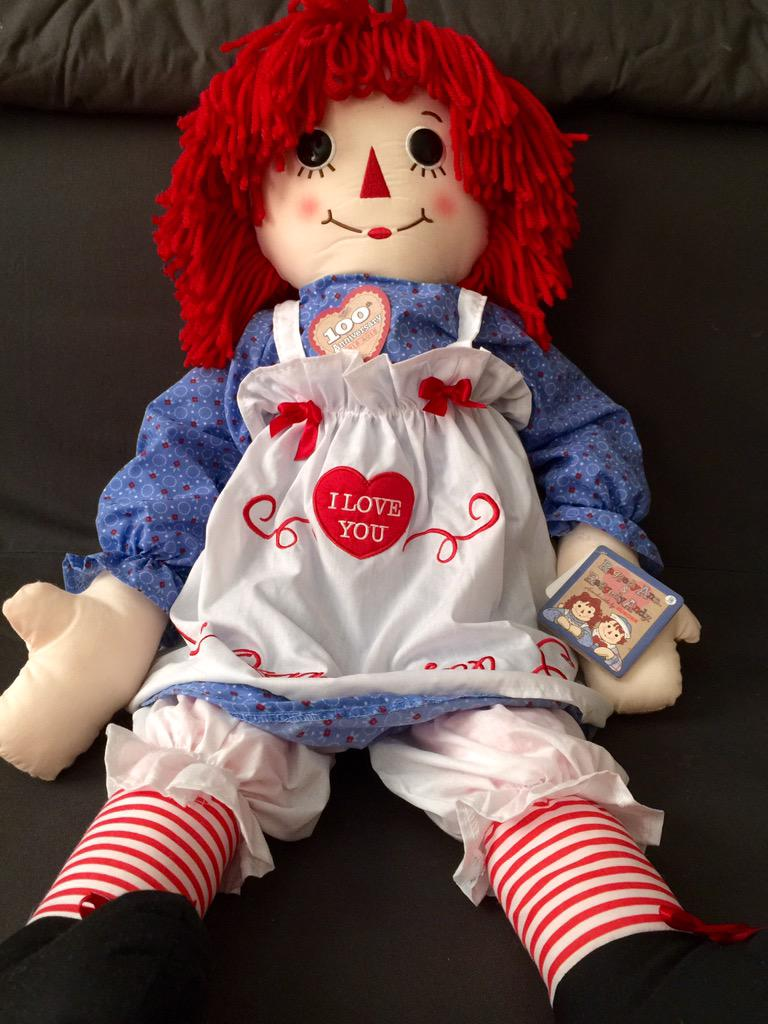
Raggedy Ann doll

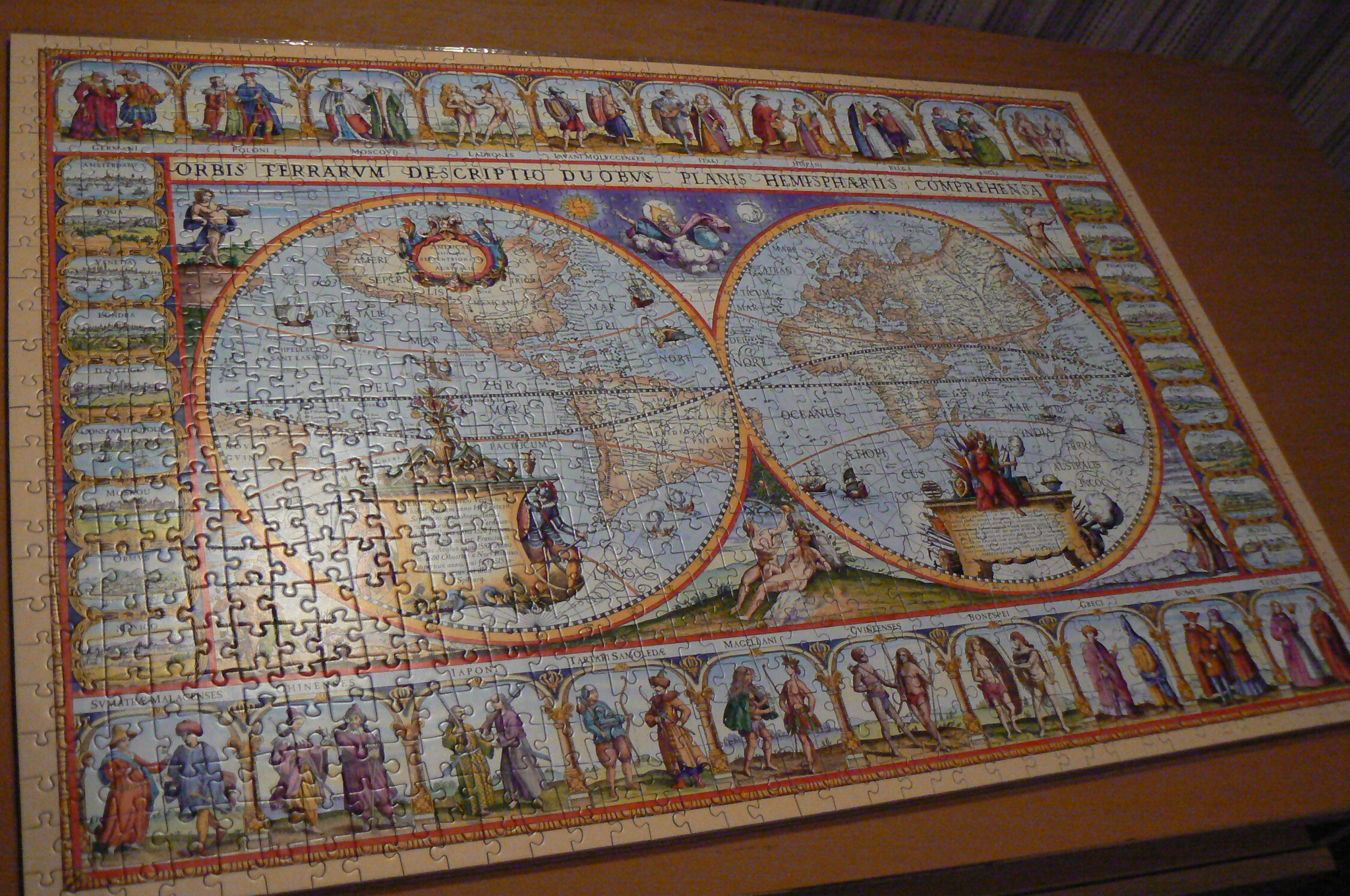
A completed Jigsaw puzzle

The following toys were added in 2002:

1. Jigsaw puzzle
2. Raggedy Ann: her induction this year came after a full year of campaigning from fans.

There were more than ninety nominees this year.

=== Class of 2003 ===
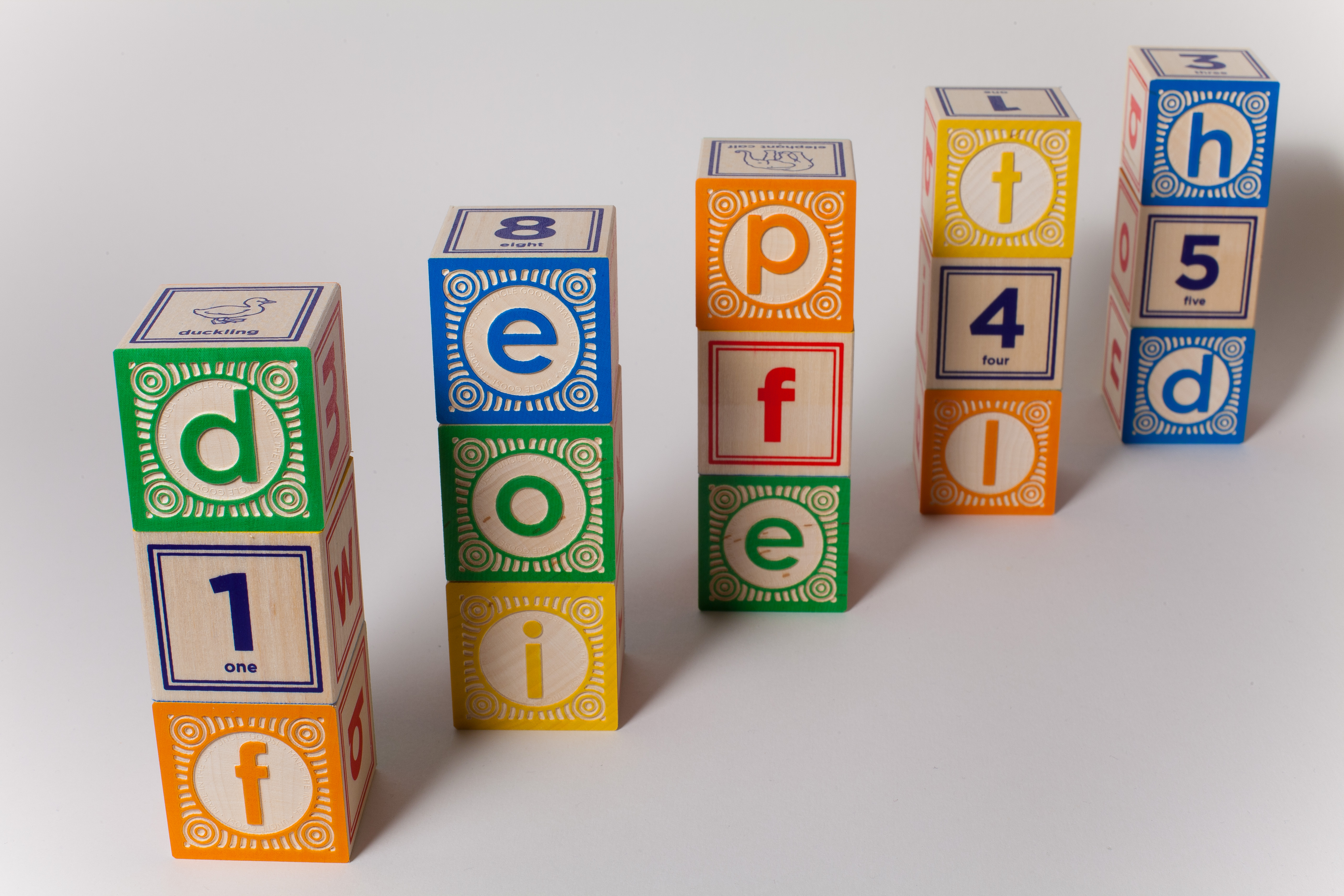
Blocks with letters and numbers

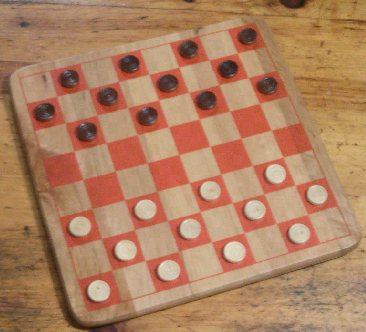
English draughts board (aka checkers)

The following toys were added in 2003:

1. Alphabet blocks
2. Checkers

Finalists included: Big Wheel tricycle, Candy Land, Clue, Easy-Bake Oven, jack-in-the-box, Lionel trains, Little People, Magic 8 Ball, Matchbox model cars, and Scrabble.

=== Class of 2004 ===
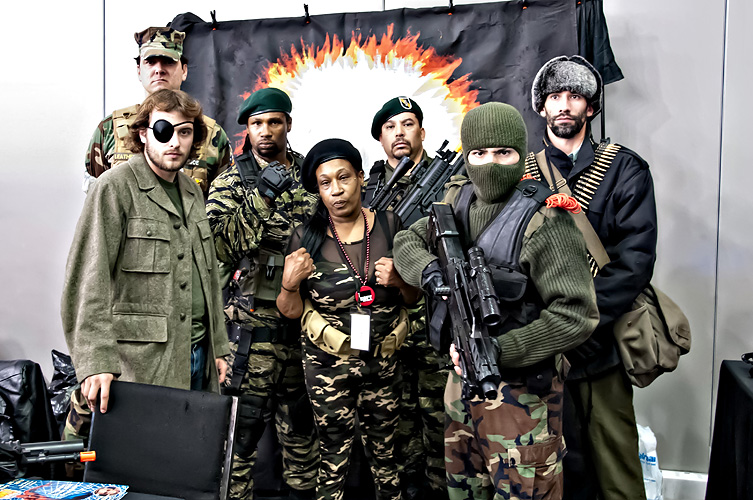
G.I. Joe cosplayers

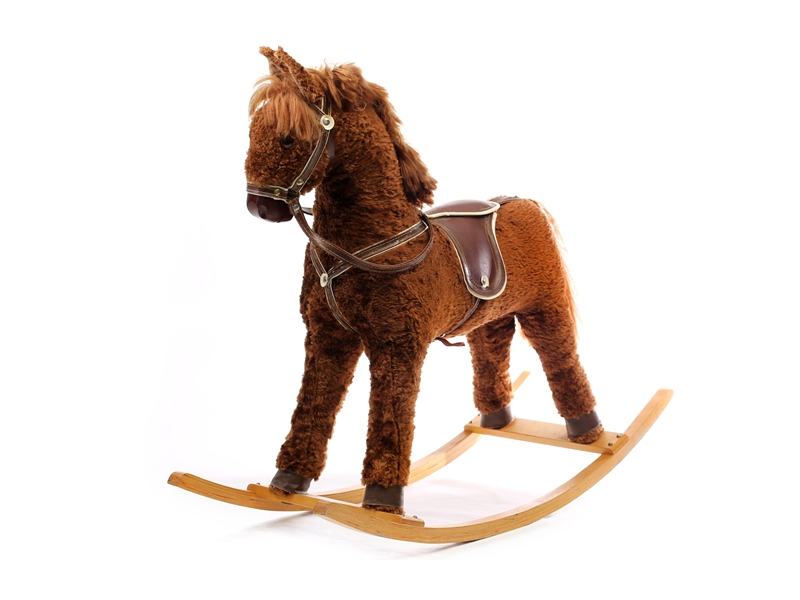
A rocking horse

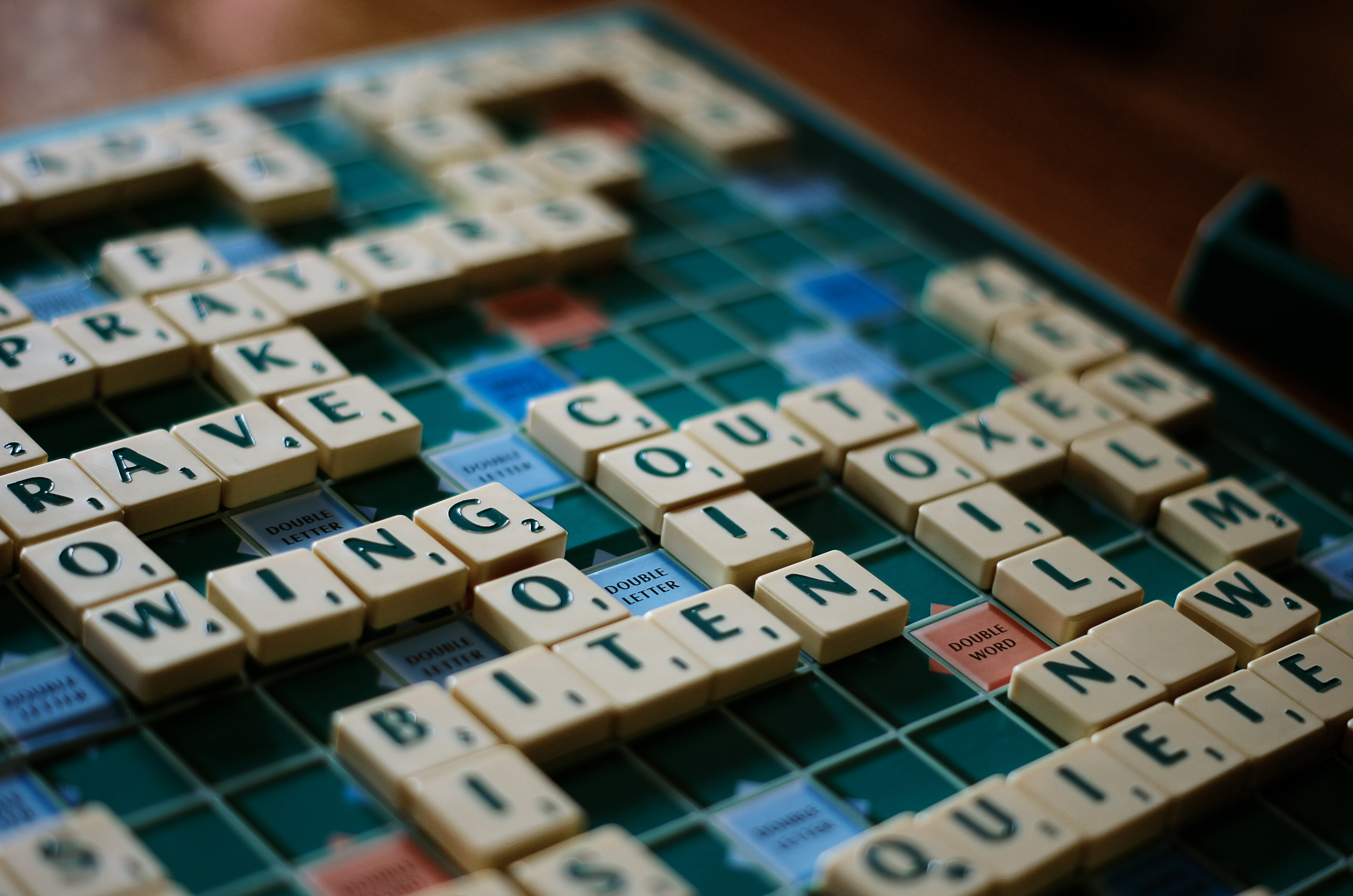
Game of Scrabble in progress

The following toys were added in 2004:

1. G.I. Joe: the G.I. Joe brand overwhelmed the competition in a Playthings Magazine poll asking which nominated toy most deserved to be honored.
2. Rocking horse
3. Scrabble

Finalists included: Big Wheel tricycle, Cabbage Patch Kids, Candy Land, Easy-Bake Oven, Hot Wheels, Lionel Trains, Little People, Rubik's Cube, and Wiffle ball.

=== Class of 2005 ===
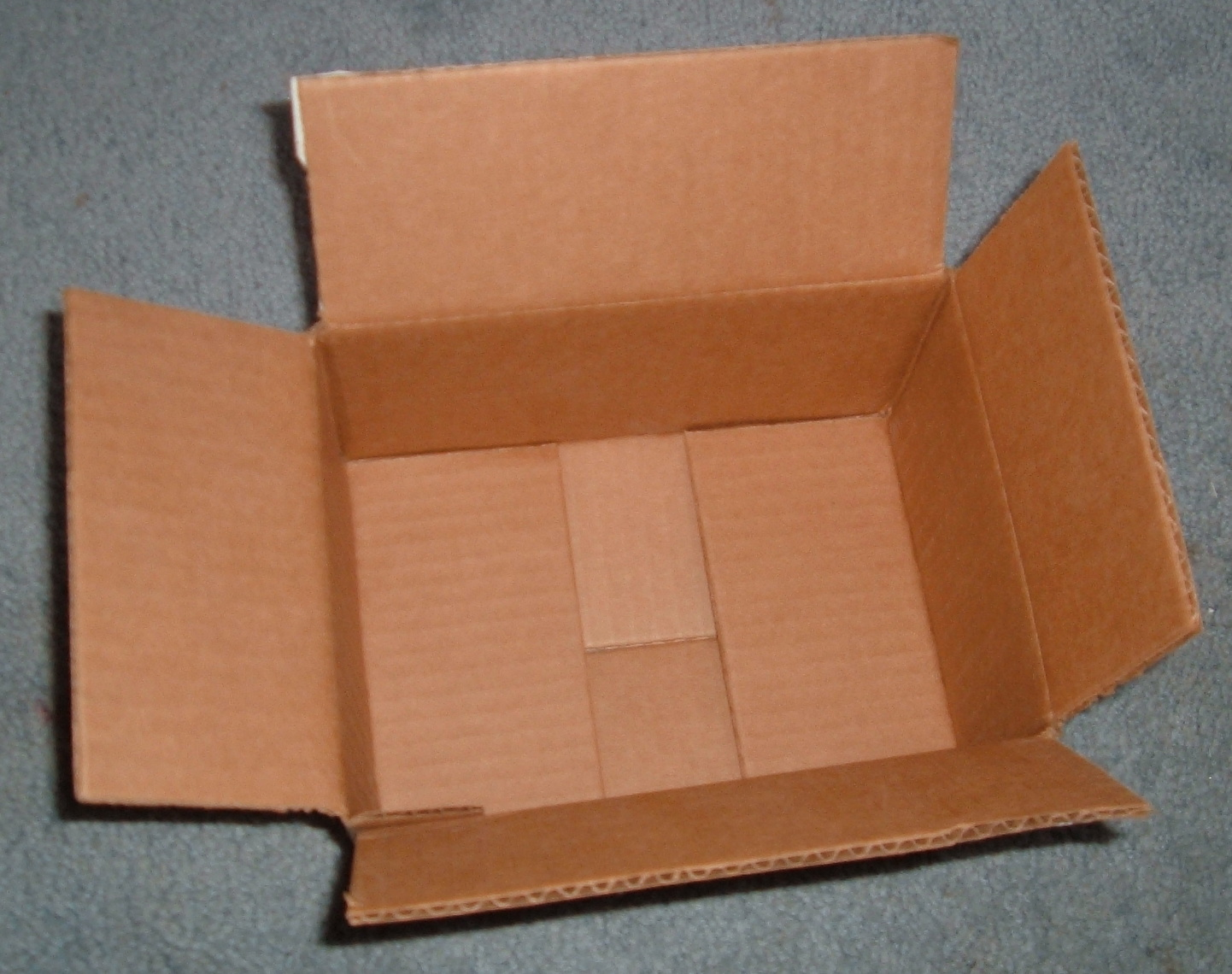
Cardboard Box

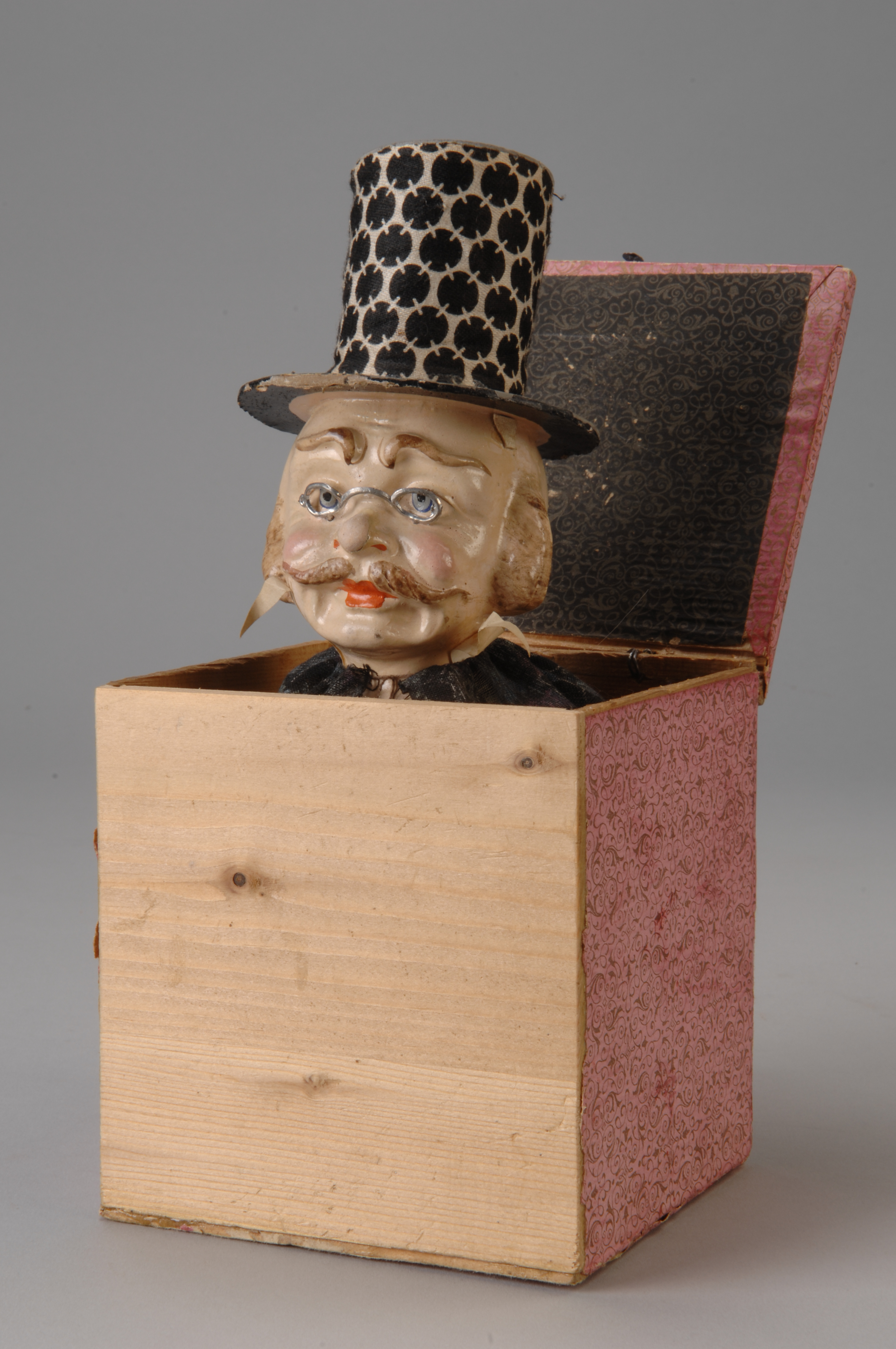
Jack in the Box

The following toys were added in 2005:

1. Cardboard box, inducted without nomination, described as "a great play experience" that "you don't have to spend a lot" to offer.
2. Candy Land
3. Jack-in-the-box

"It's that empty box full of possibilities that kids can sense and the adults don't always see", said Christopher Bensch, chief curator at the Strong Museum.

Finalists included: Atari 2600, Big Wheel tricycle, Cabbage Patch Kids, Clue, Easy-Bake Oven, Hot Wheels, Lionel trains, Little People, Magic 8 Ball, and Wiffle ball.

=== Class of 2006 ===
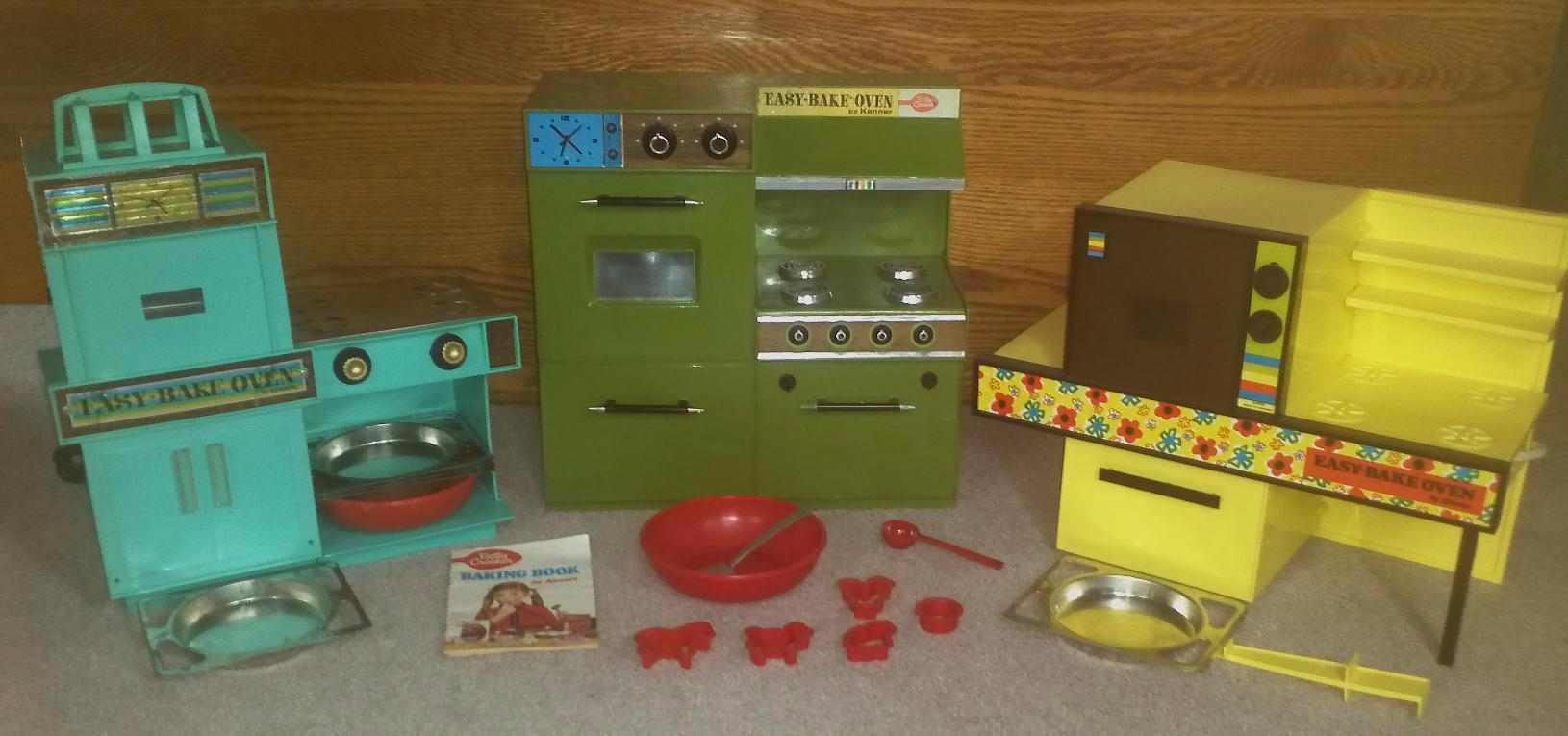
The first three versions of the Easy-Bake oven

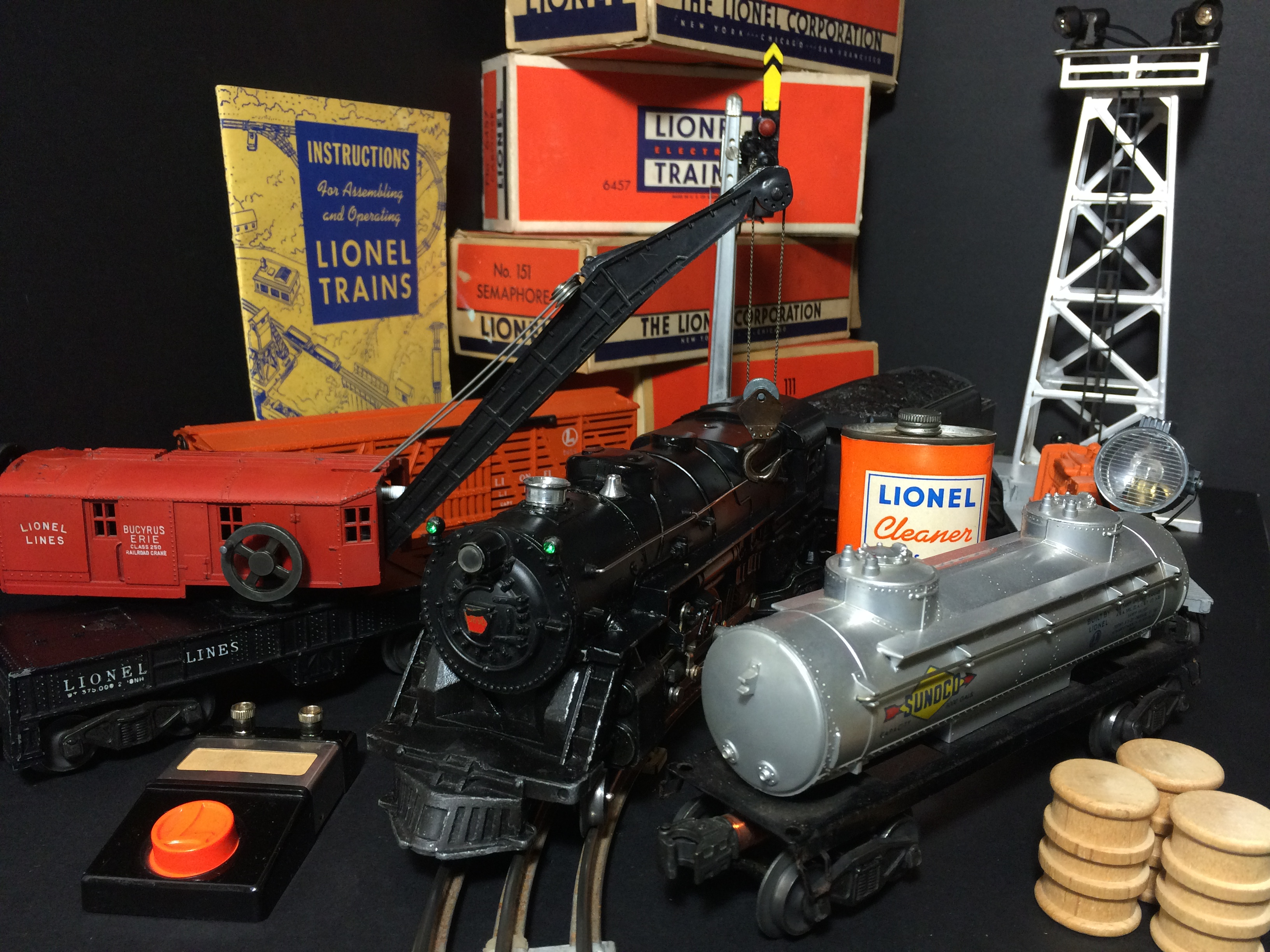
Lionel Corporation products

The following toys were added in 2006:

1. Easy-Bake Oven
2. Lionel Trains

Finalists included: Atari Game System, Big Wheel tricycle, Lite-Brite, Little People, Hot Wheels, Operation skill game, Pez candy dispenser, the rubber duck, the skateboard, and Twister.

=== Class of 2007 ===
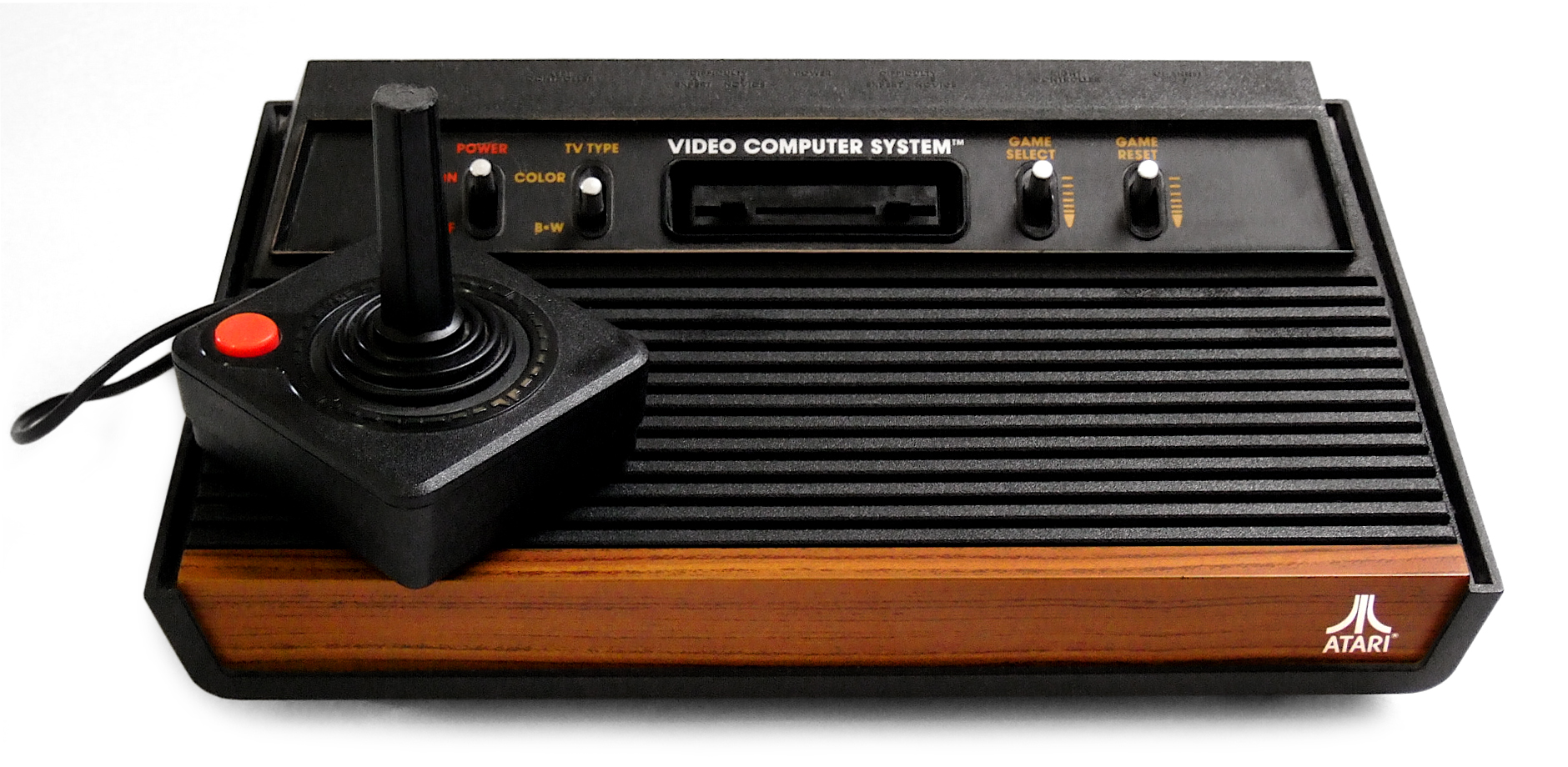
Atari 2600 four-switch "wood veneer" version; the original 2600 had six switches

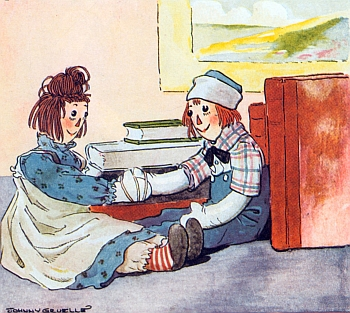
Raggedy Ann meets Raggedy Andy for the first time; illustrated by Johnny Gruelle

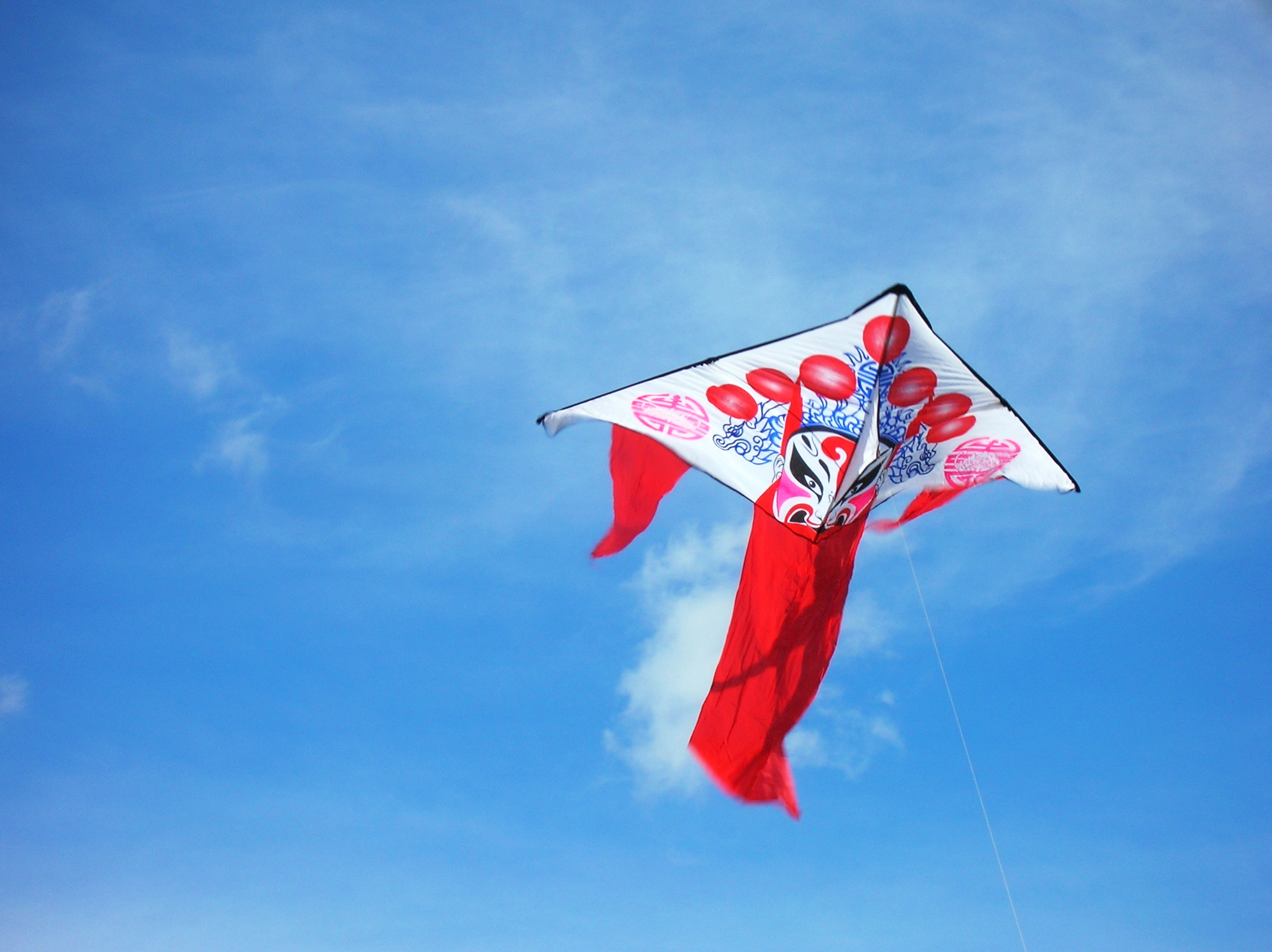
A chinese "single line“ kite in flight

The following toys were added in 2007:

1. Atari 2600
2. Kite
3. Raggedy Andy: he was inducted as an extension of Raggedy Ann.

Finalists included: The baby doll, Big Wheel tricycle, The Game of Life, Hot Wheels, My Little Pony dolls, the pogo stick, the skateboard, Spirograph, and Yahtzee.

=== Class of 2008 ===
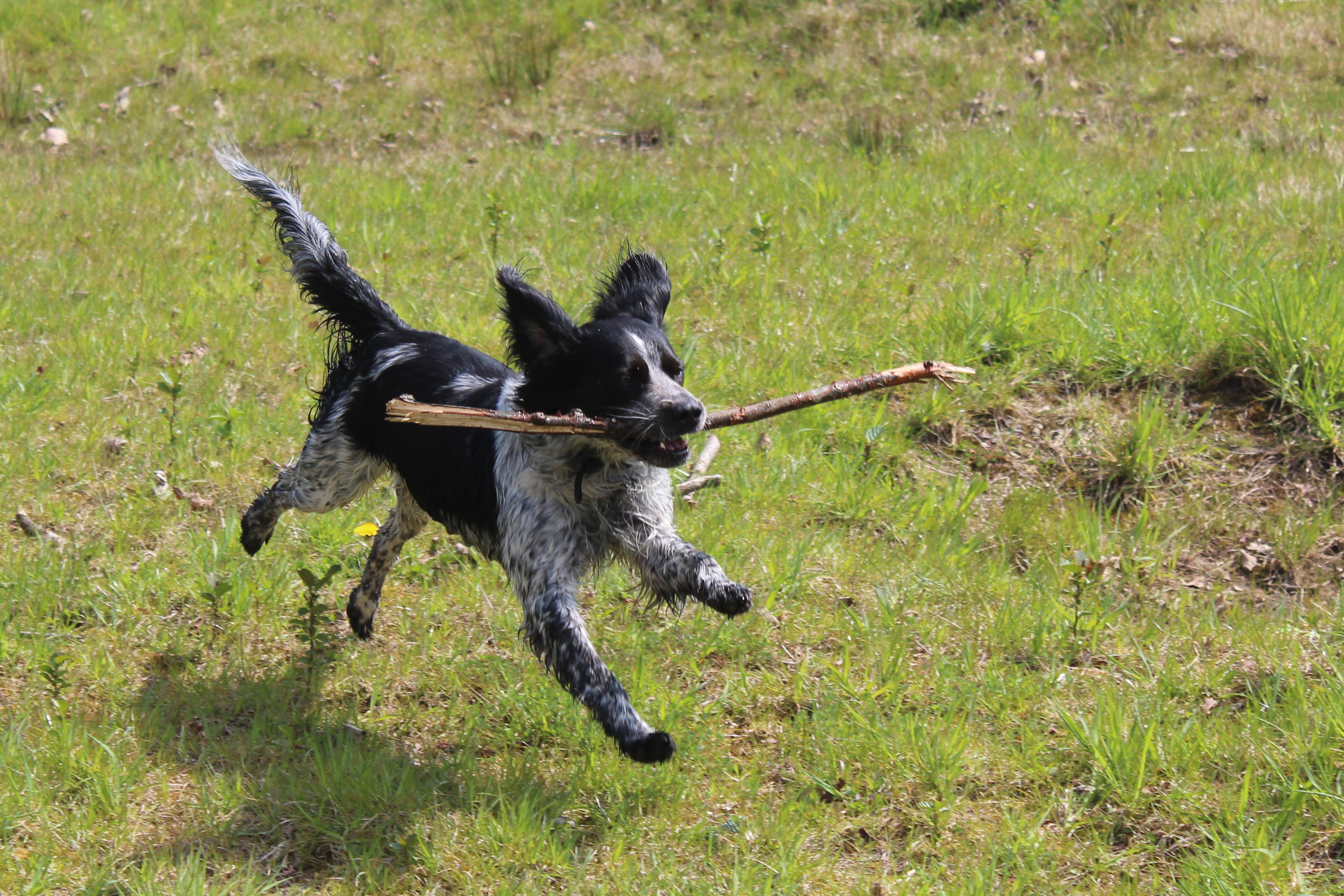
A dog with a stick

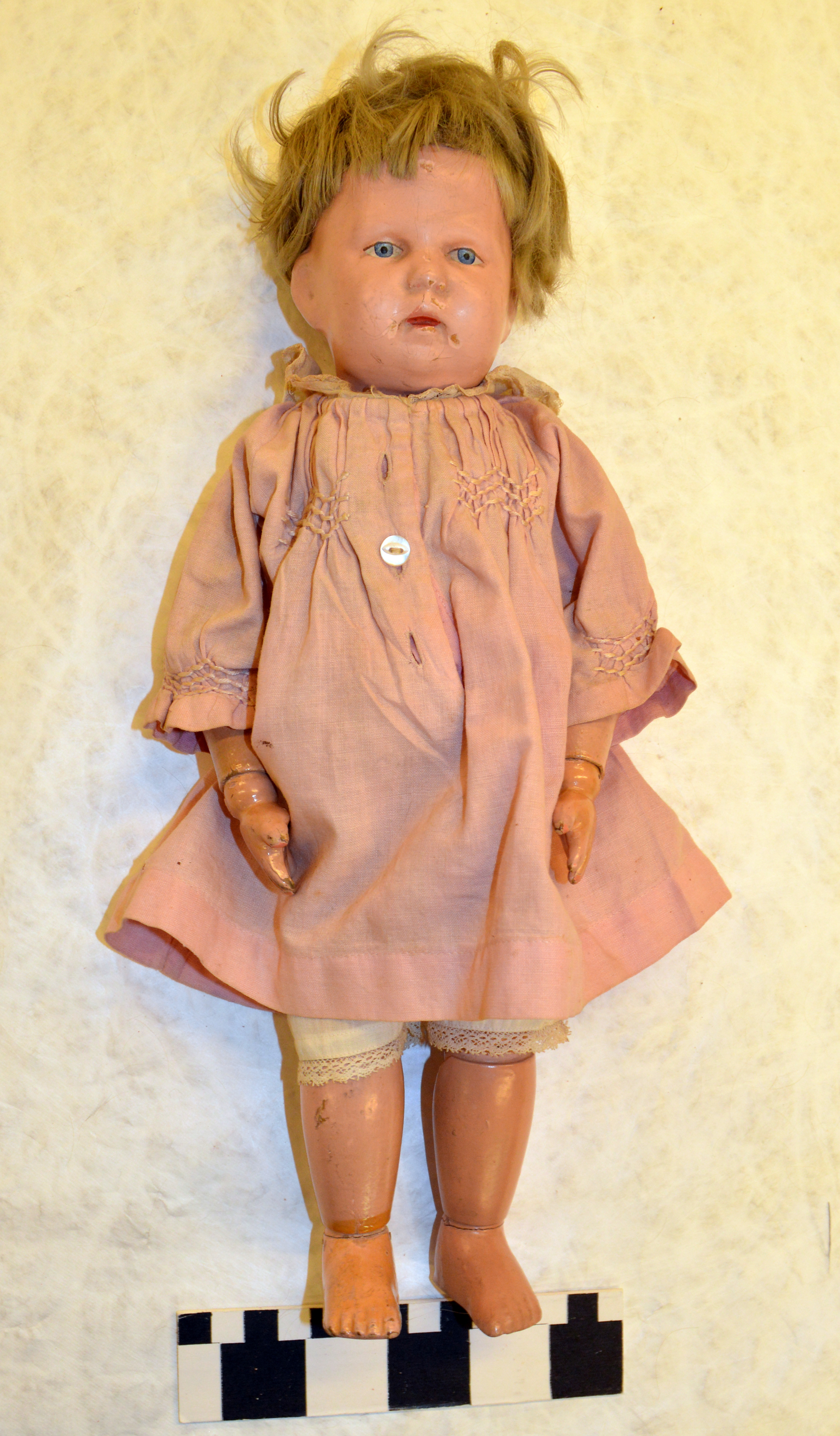
Baby doll

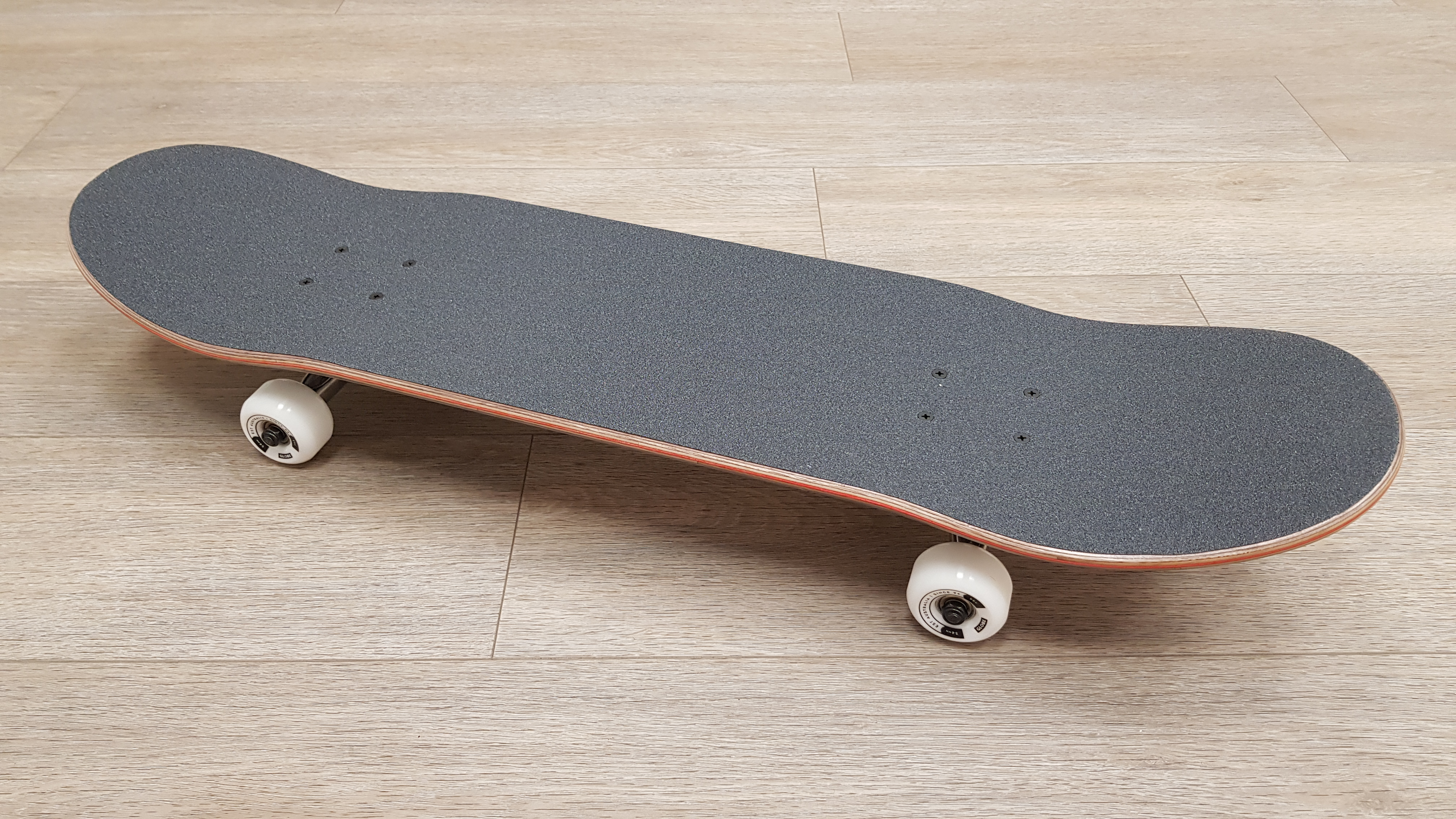
Skateboard

The following toys were added in 2008:

1. The stick, praised by curators for its all-purpose, no-cost, recreational qualities: possibly the world's oldest toy and "possibly the best!"
2. The baby doll
3. The skateboard

Finalists included: Clue, the dollhouse, Flexible flyer sleds, The Game of Life, Hot Wheels, Magic 8 Ball, Rubik's Cube, Thomas the Tank Engine, Wiffle ball, and Yahtzee. The stick was inducted without nomination.

=== Class of 2009 ===
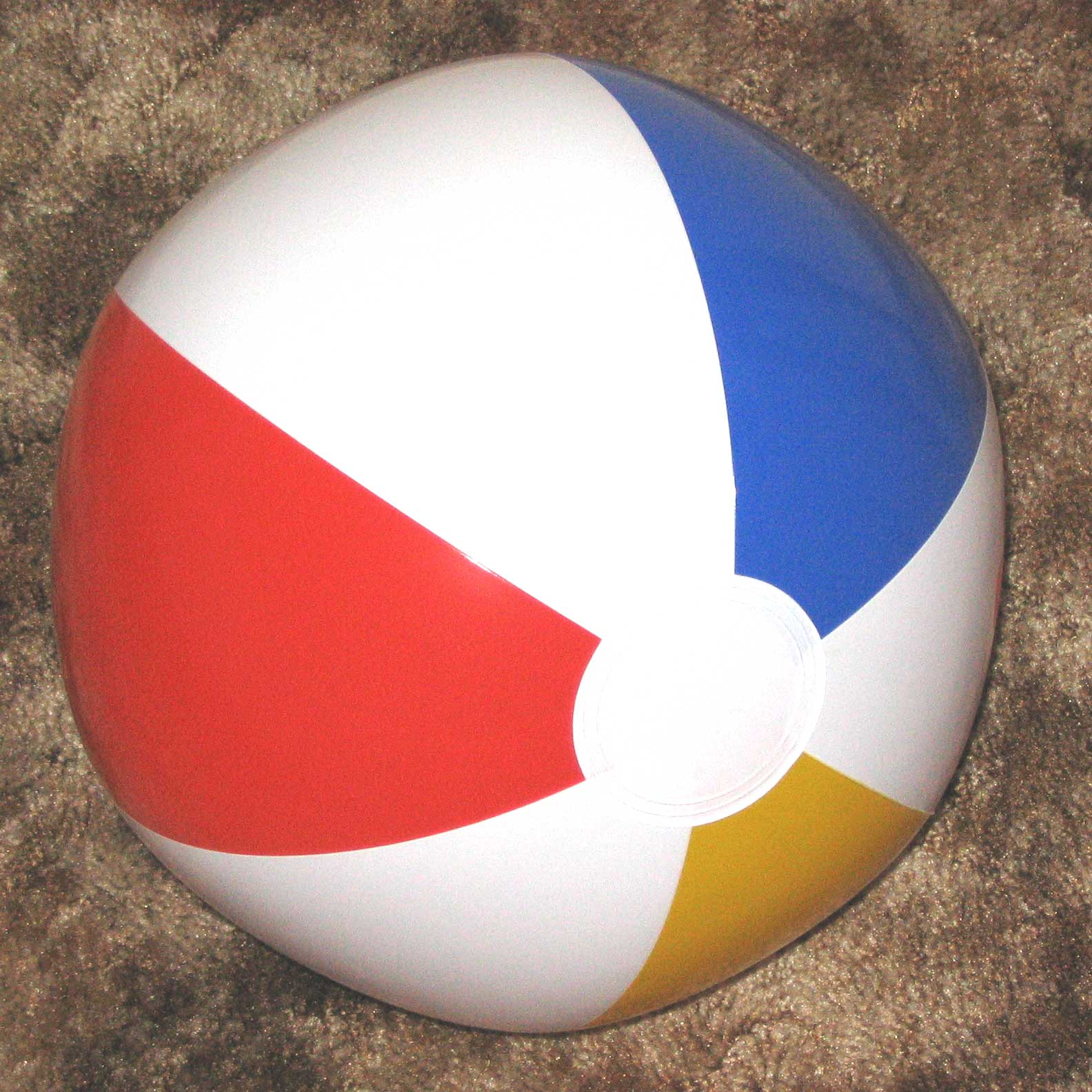
Ball

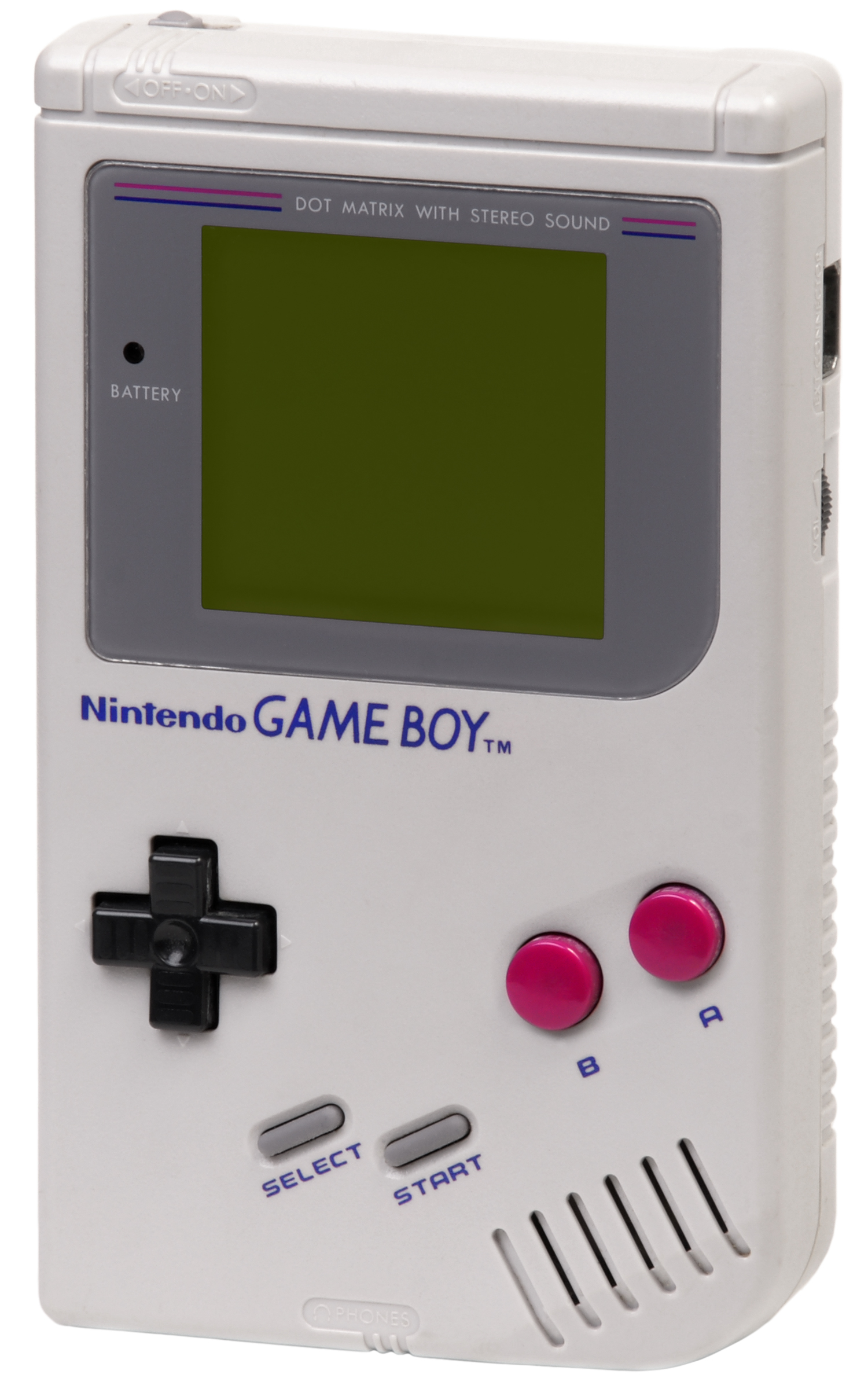
Nintendo Game Boy

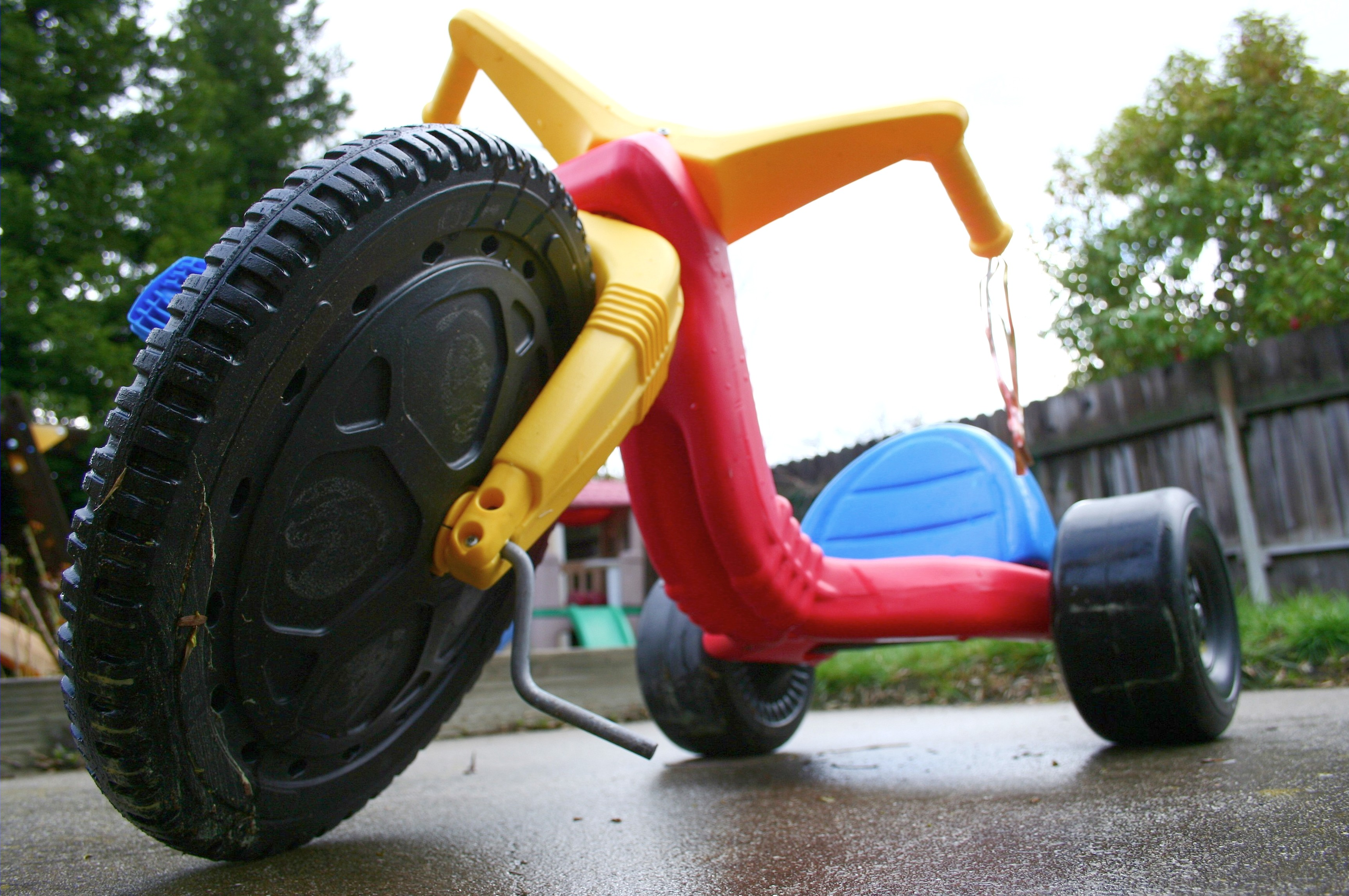
Big Wheel

The following toys were added in 2009:

1. Ball
2. Game Boy
3. Big Wheel tricycle

Finalists included: Cabbage Patch Kids, The Game of Life, Hot Wheels, the paper airplane, playing cards, Rubik's Cube, sidewalk chalk, the toy tea set, and Transformers action figures.

== 2010s ==
=== Class of 2010 ===
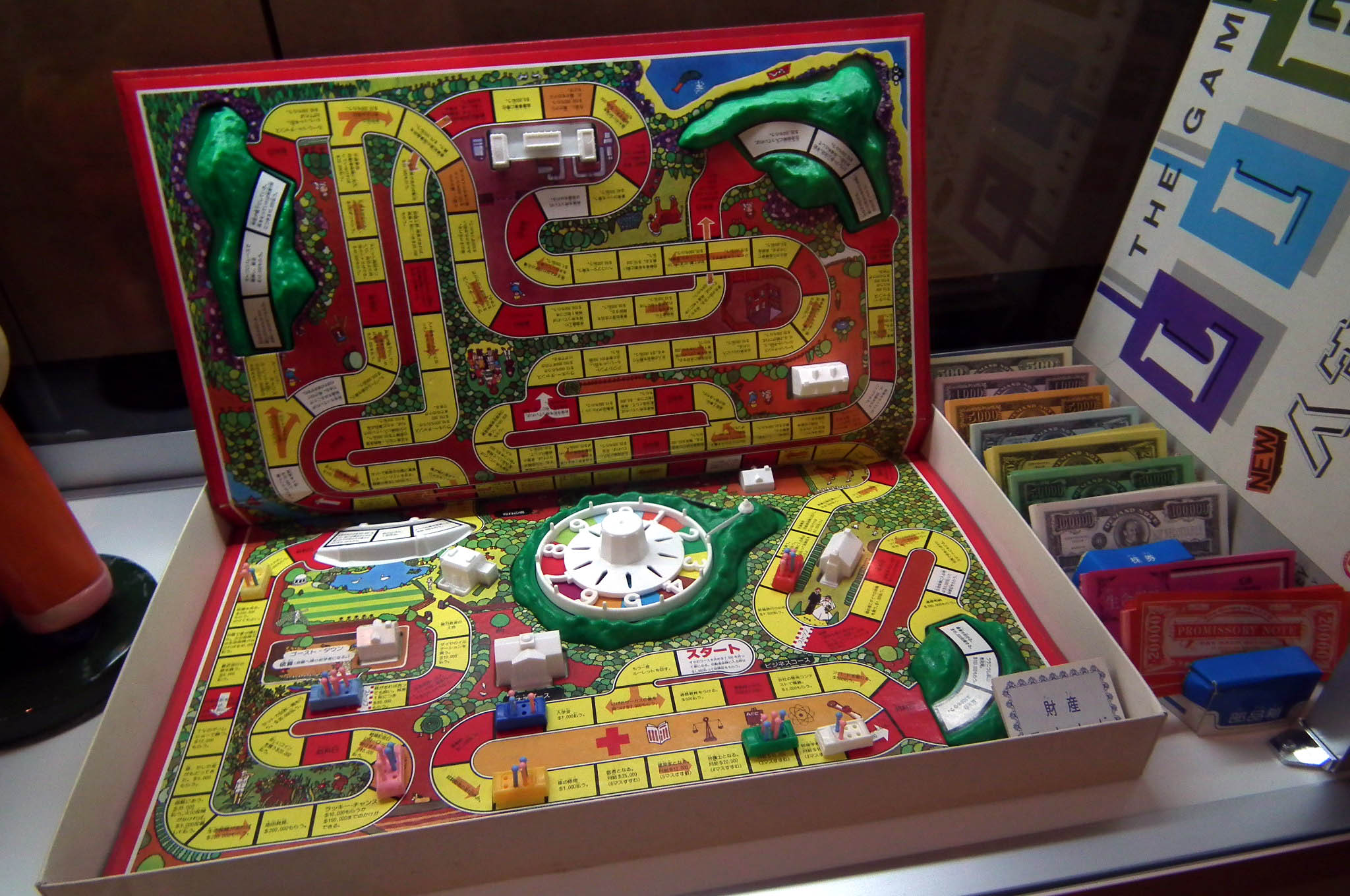
Board from the Game of Life

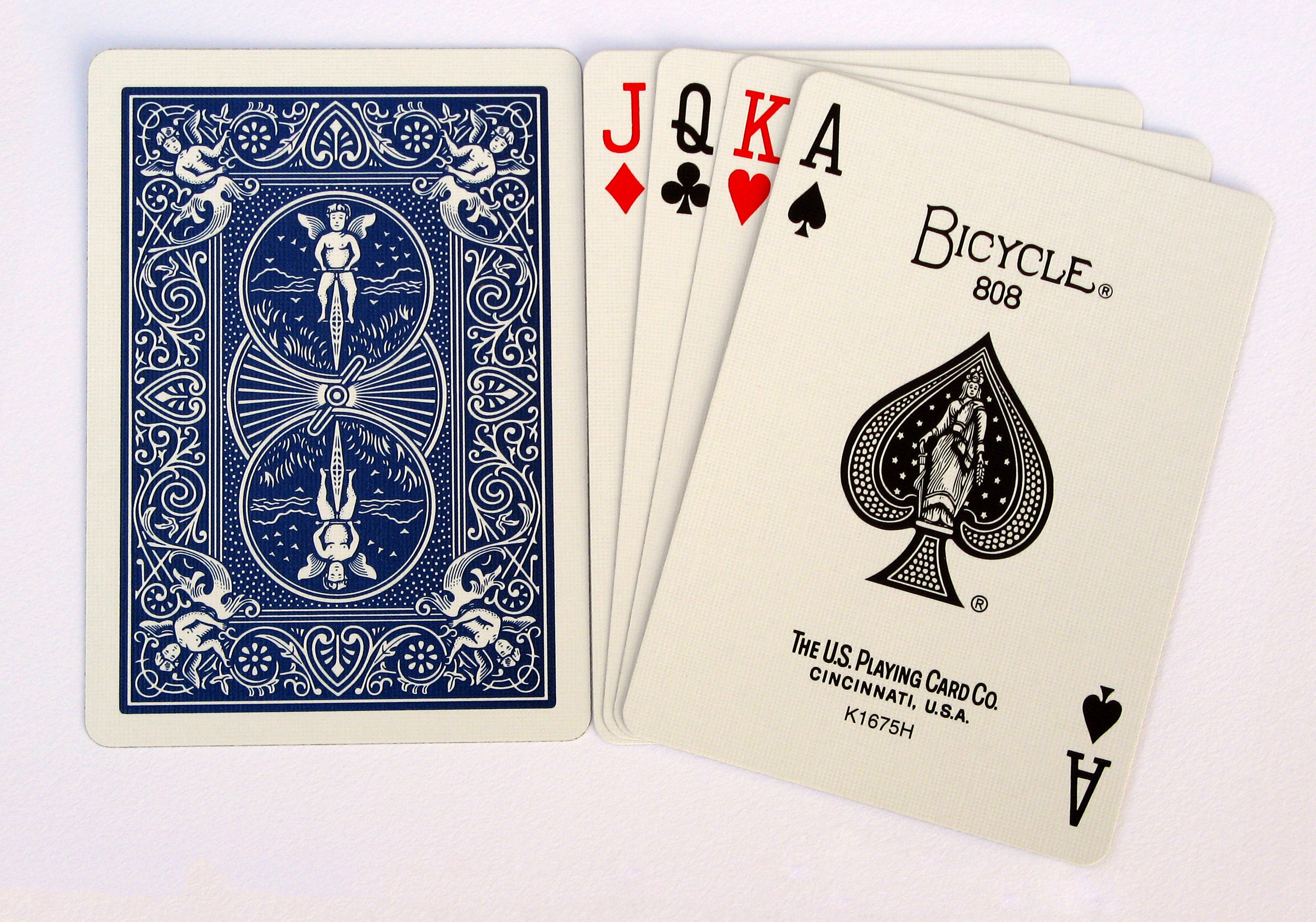
Playing cards

The following toys were added in 2010:

1. The Game of Life
2. Playing cards

Finalists included: Cabbage Patch Kids, chess, the dollhouse, dominoes, Dungeons & Dragons, Hot Wheels, Lite-Brite, Magic 8 Ball, the pogo stick, and Rubik's Cube.

=== Class of 2011 ===
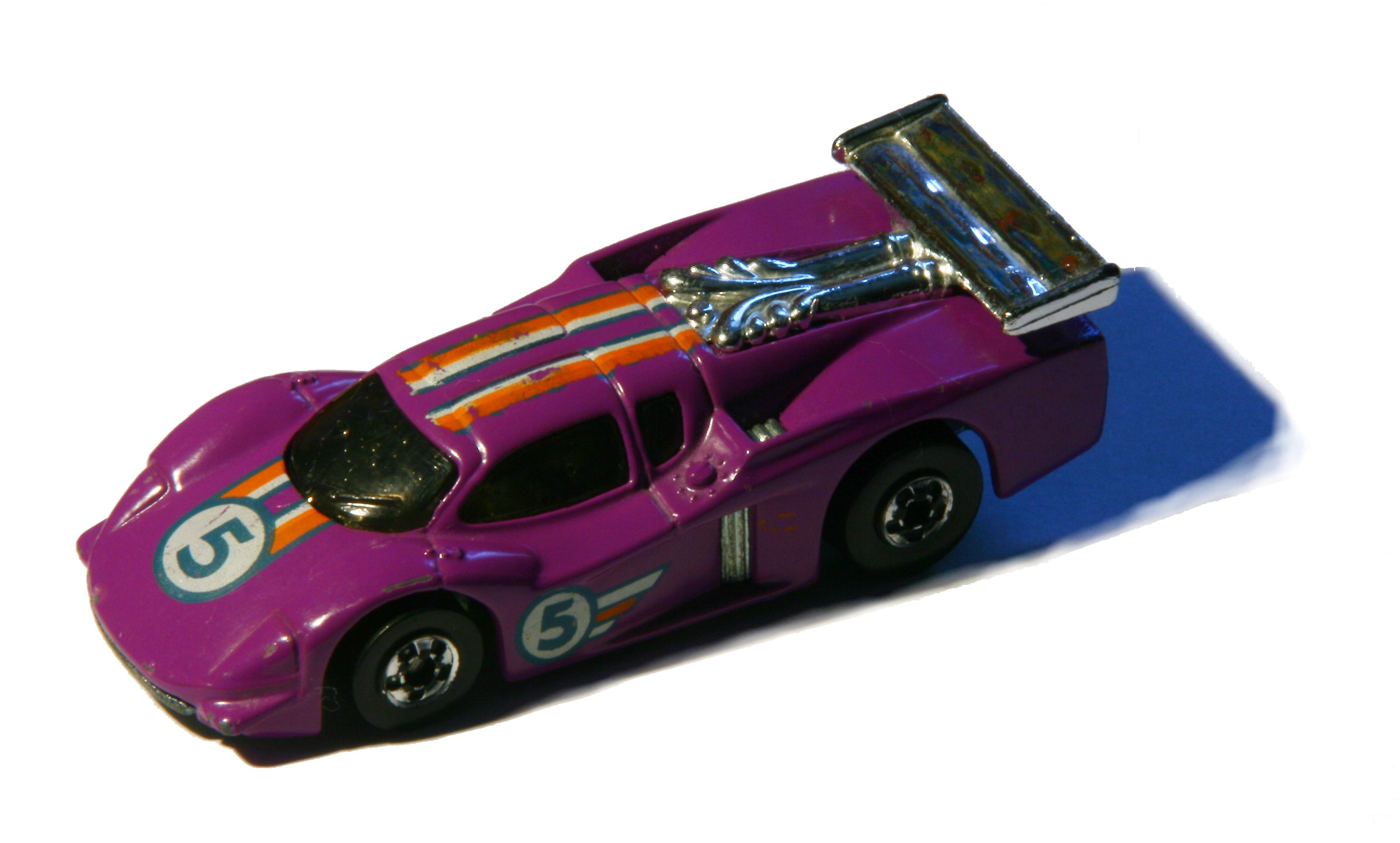
Hot Wheels car

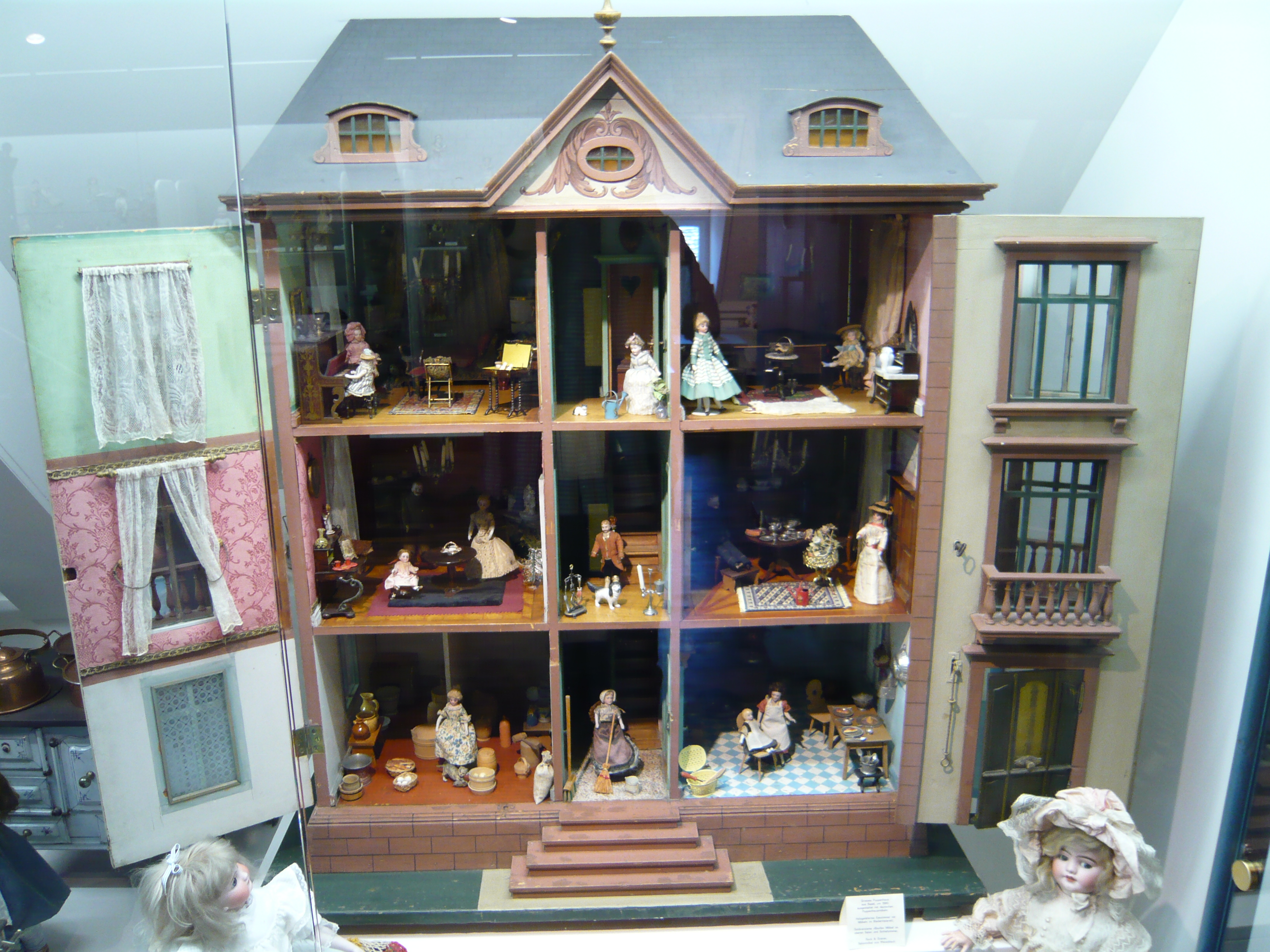
A three story dollhouse

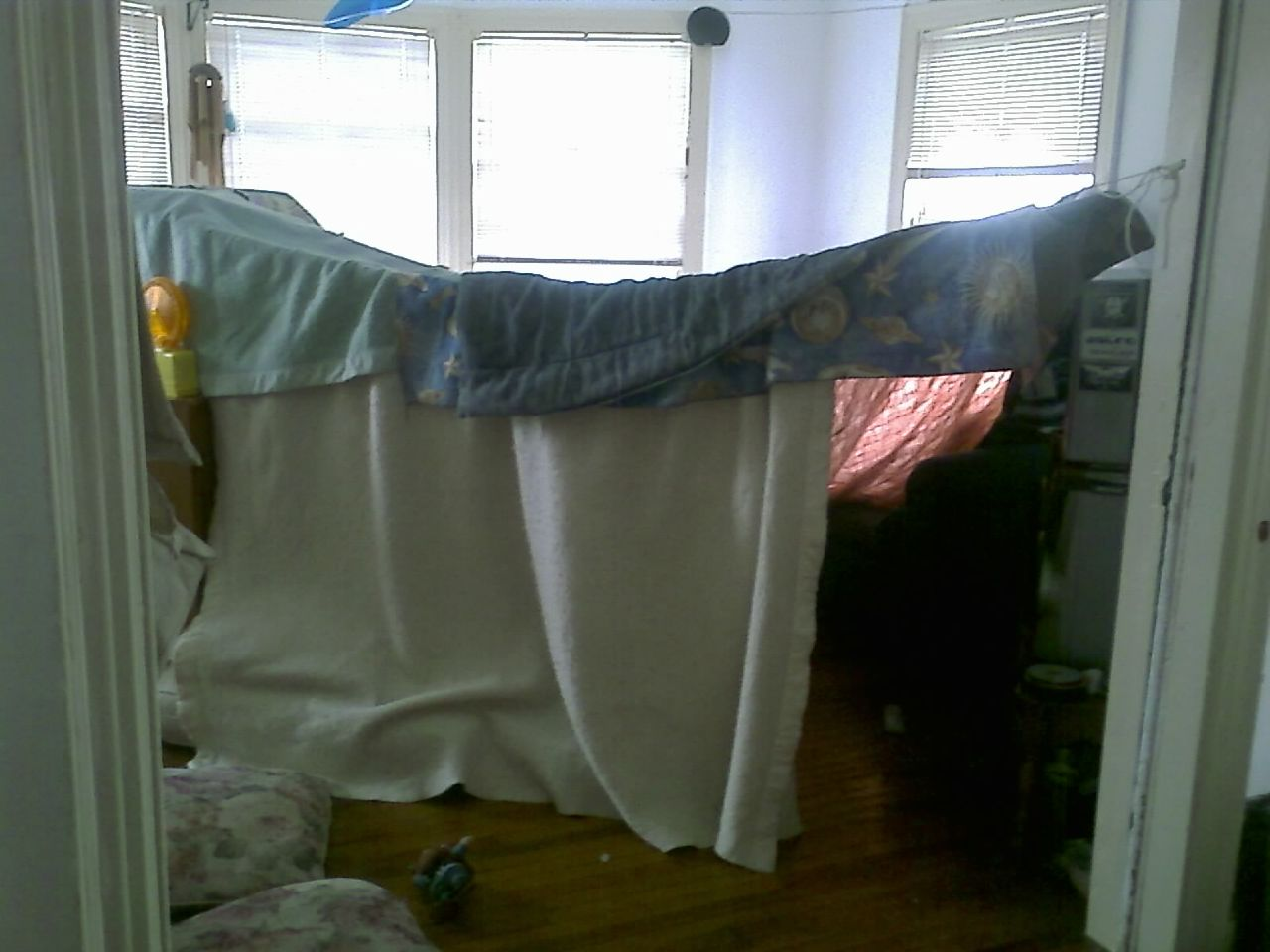
Blanket fort

The following toys were added in 2011:

1. Hot Wheels
2. Dollhouse
3. Blanket

Finalists included: Dungeons & Dragons, Jenga, pogo sticks, puppets, radio-controlled cars, Rubik's Cube, Simon, Star Wars action figures, Transformers action figures, and Twister. The blanket was inducted without nomination.

=== Class of 2012 ===
The following toys were added in 2012:

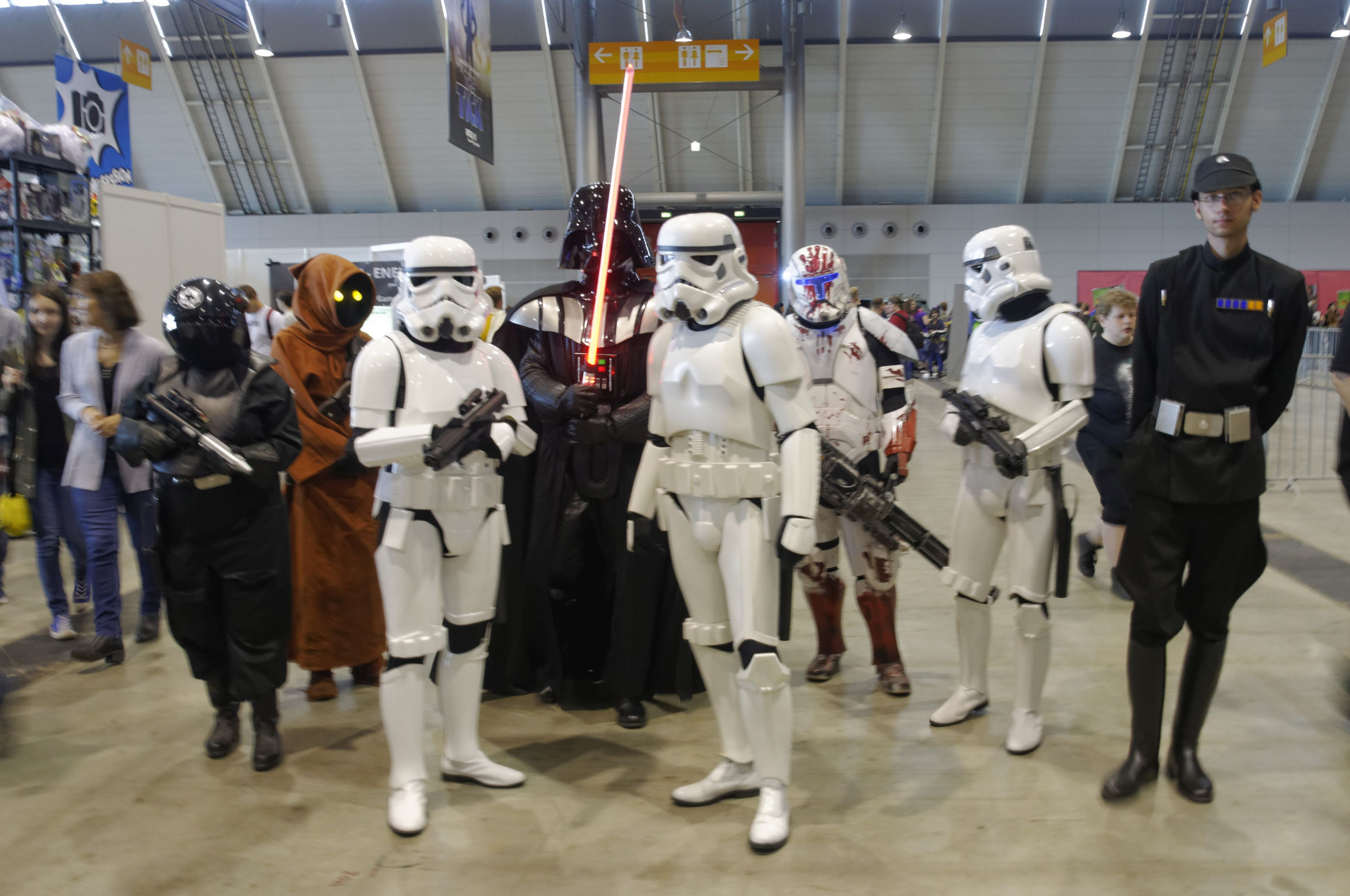
Cosplay of the Star Wars characters

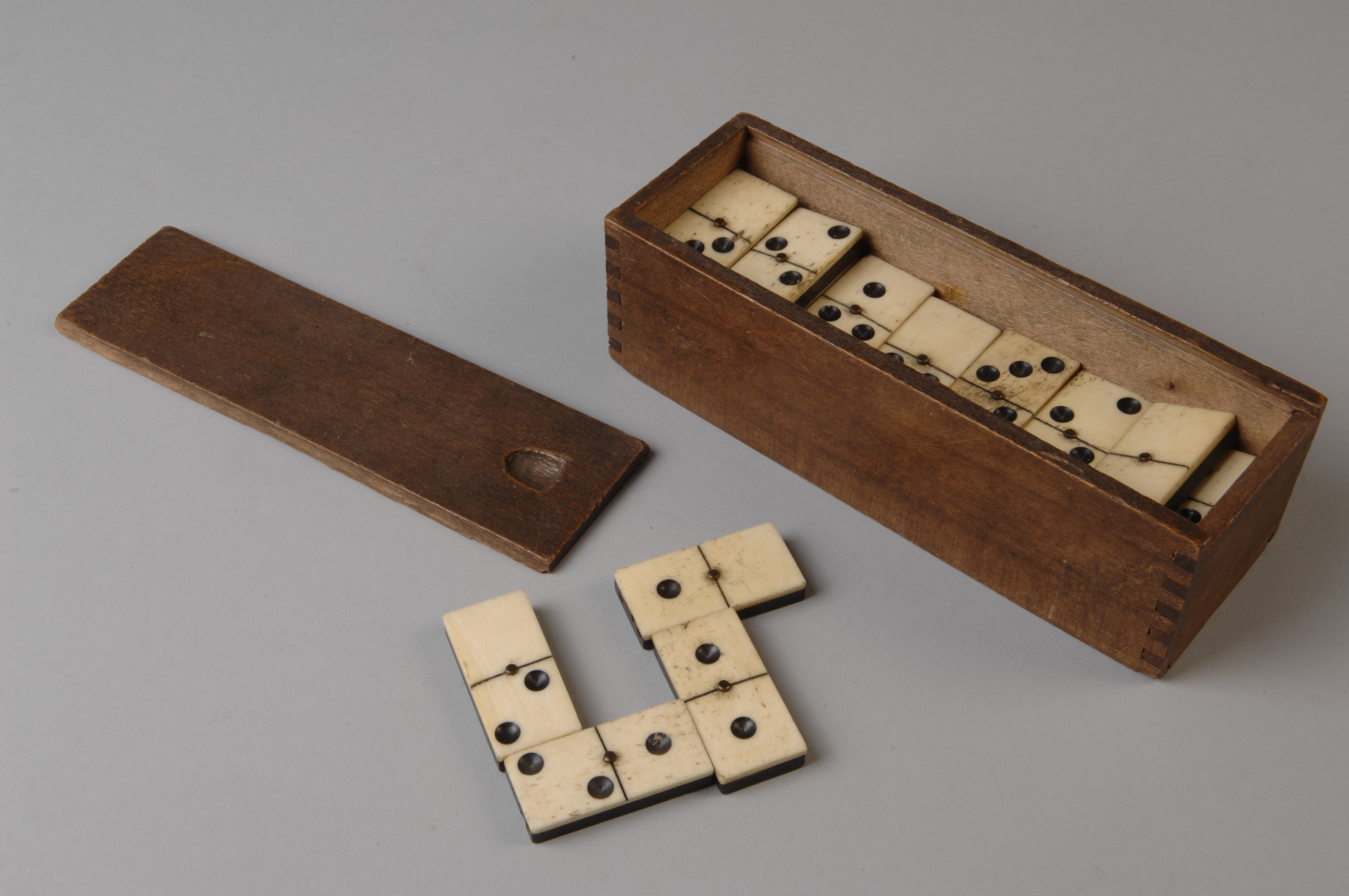
A boxed domino set

1. Star Wars action figures
2. Dominoes

Finalists included: Corn Popper, Clue, Lite-Brite, little green army men, Magic 8 Ball, the pogo stick, sidewalk chalk, Simon, the toy tea set, and Twister.

=== Class of 2013 ===
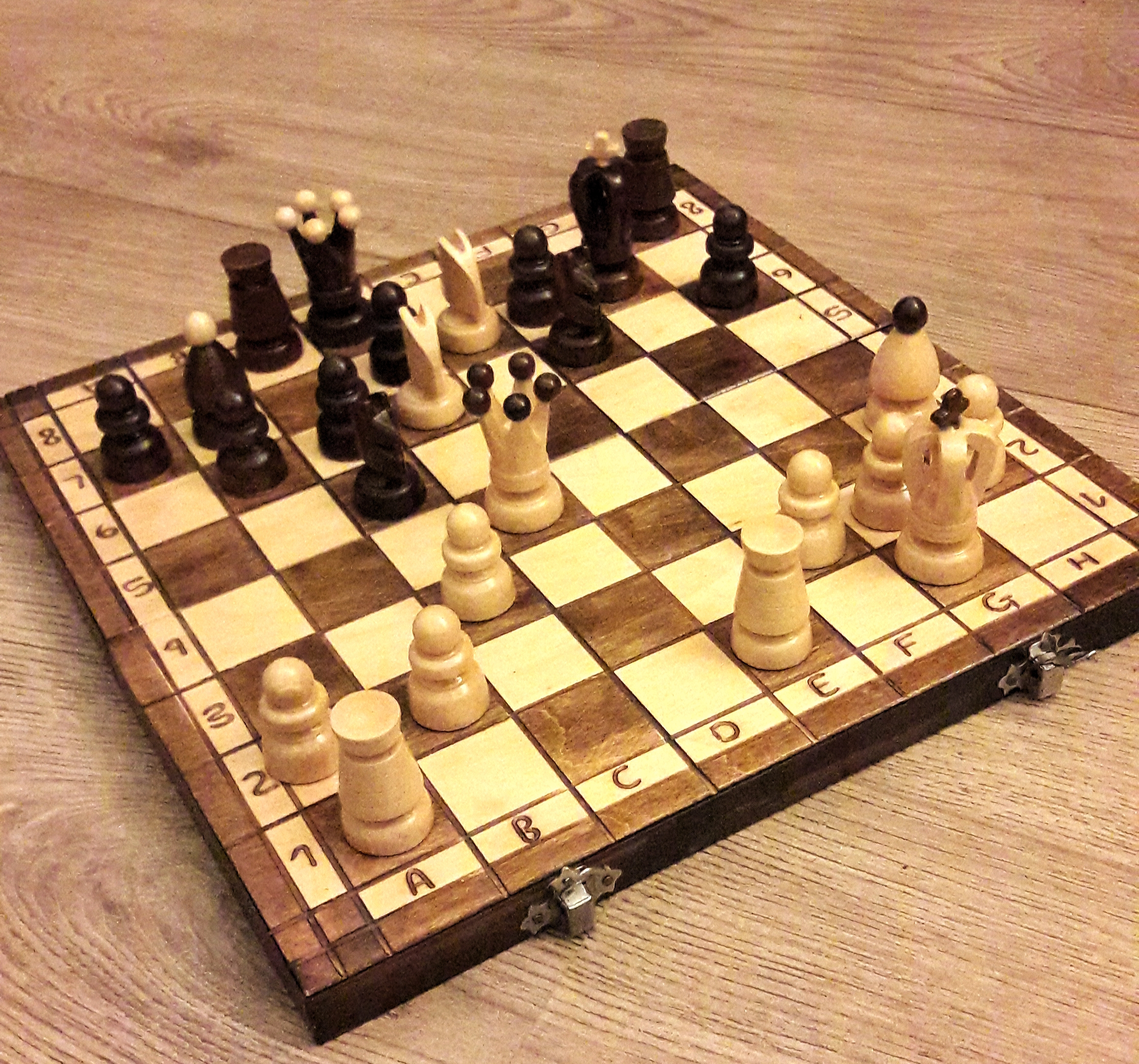
Chessboard

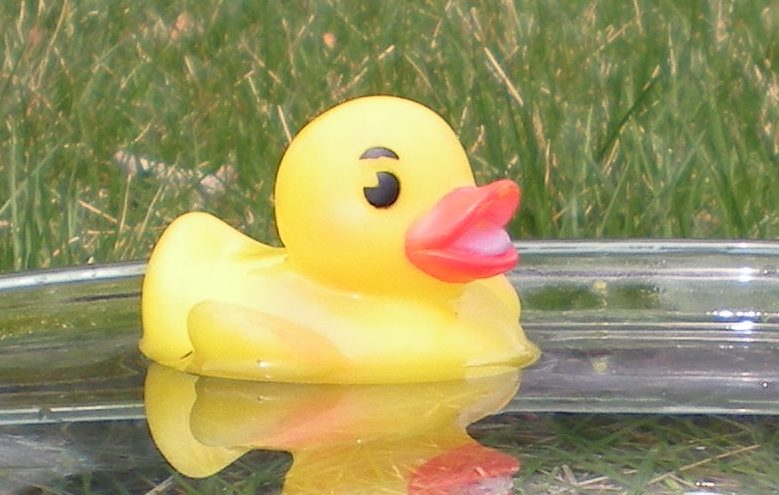
Rubber duck

The following toys were added in 2013:

1. Chess
2. Rubber duck

Finalists included: bubbles, Clue, little green army men, Little People, Magic 8 Ball, My Little Pony dolls, Nerf, Pac-Man, scooters, and Teenage Mutant Ninja Turtles action figures.

=== Class of 2014 ===
The following toys were added in 2014:

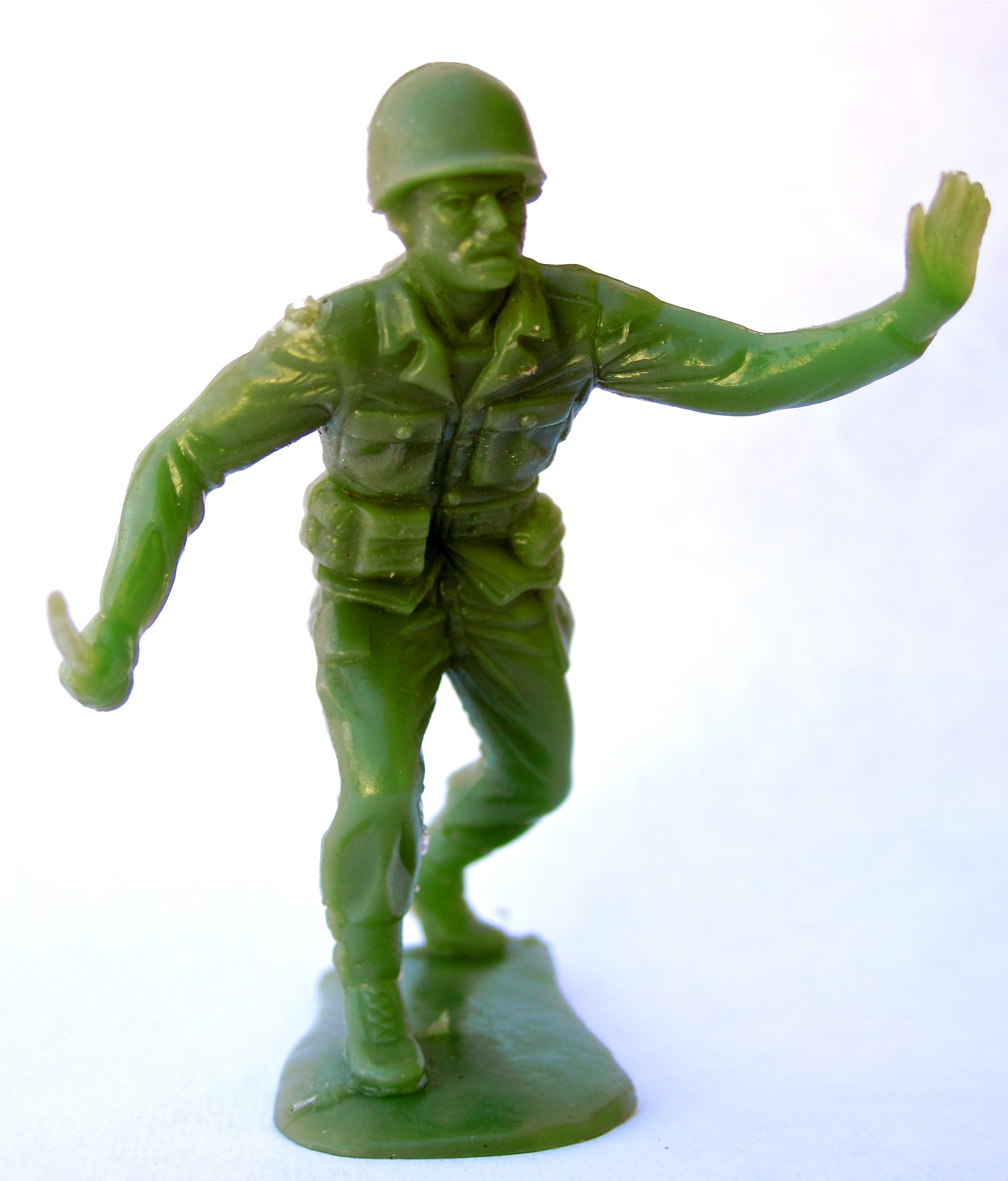
Plastic green soldier

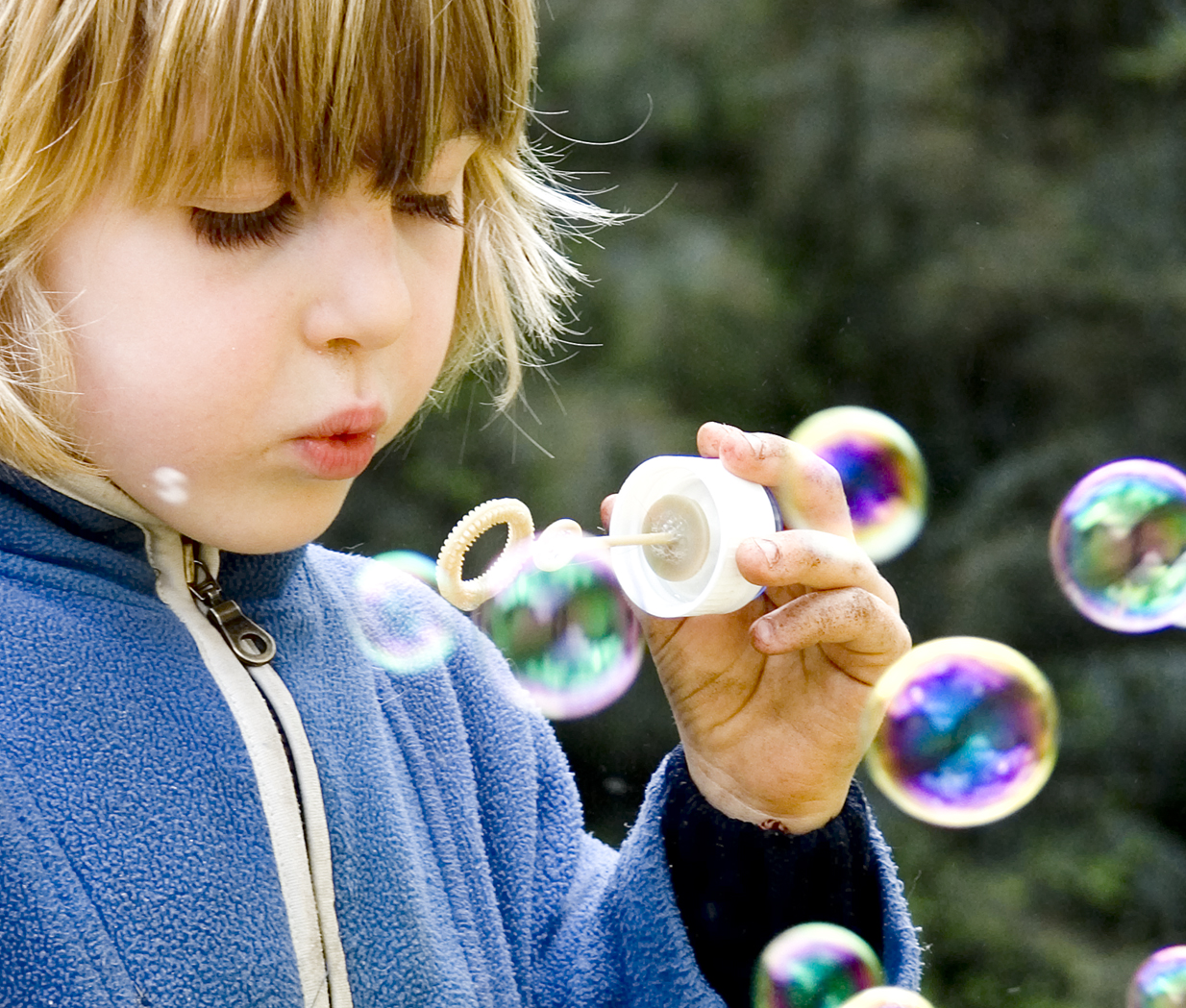
A child blowing soap bubbles

Rubik's cube

1. Little green army men
2. Bubbles
3. Rubik's Cube

Finalists included: American Girl dolls, Hess toy trucks, Little People, My Little Pony dolls, Operation skill game, the paper airplane, pots and pans, Slip 'n' Slide, and Teenage Mutant Ninja Turtles action figures.

=== Class of 2015 ===
The following toys were added in 2015:

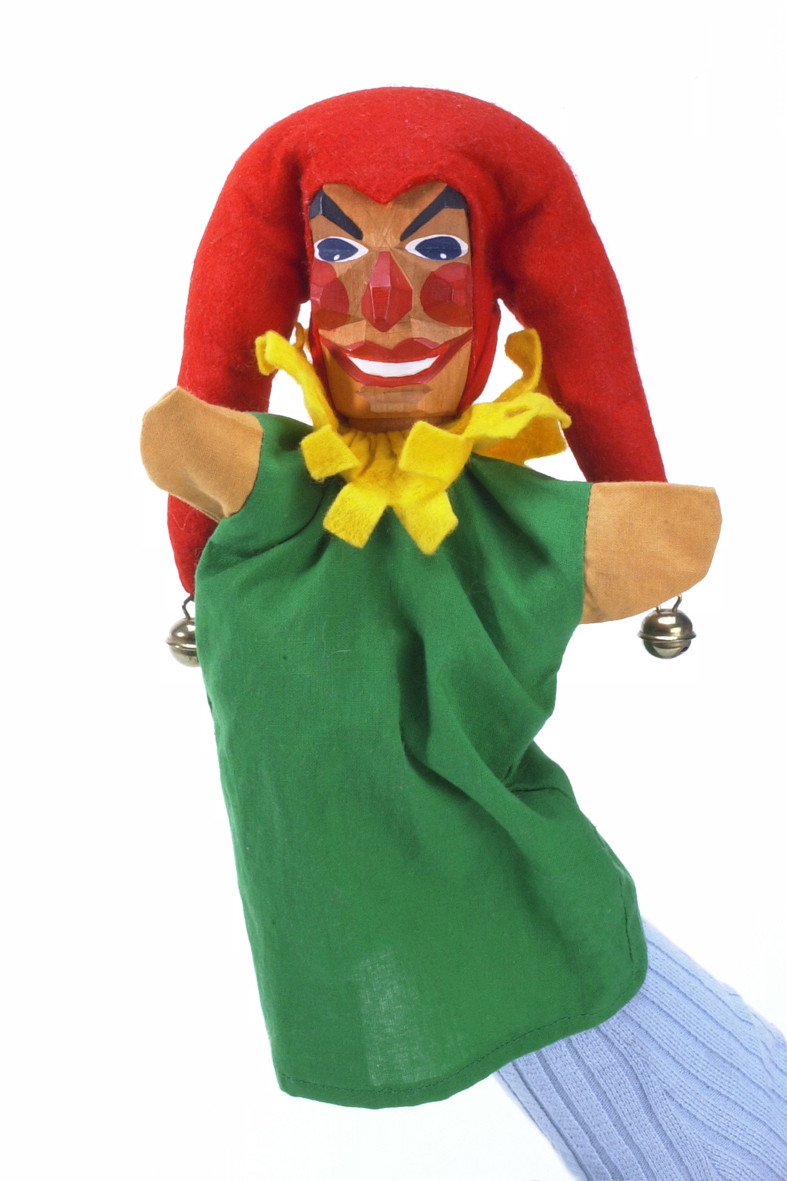
German hand puppet

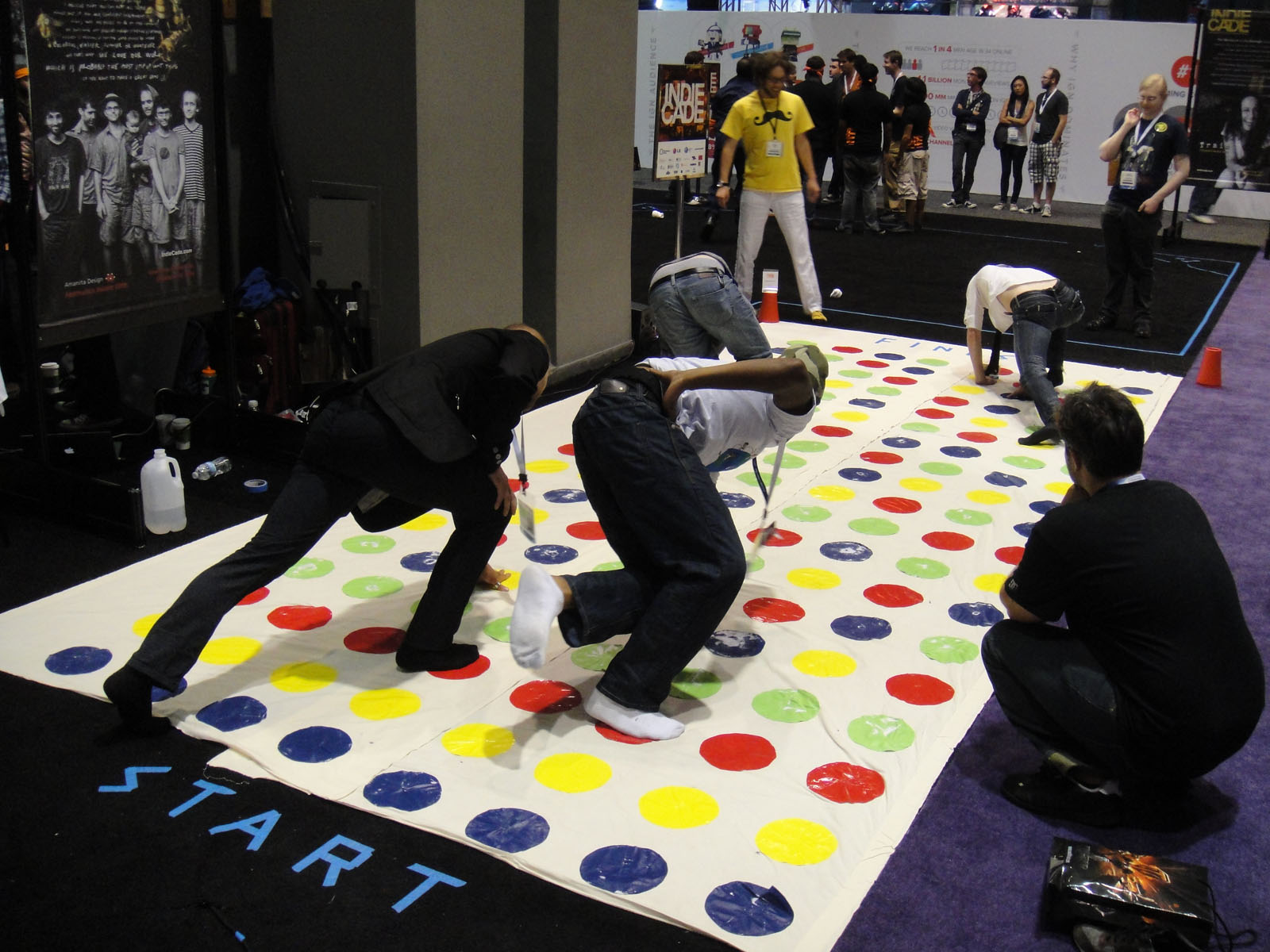
Men playing Twister

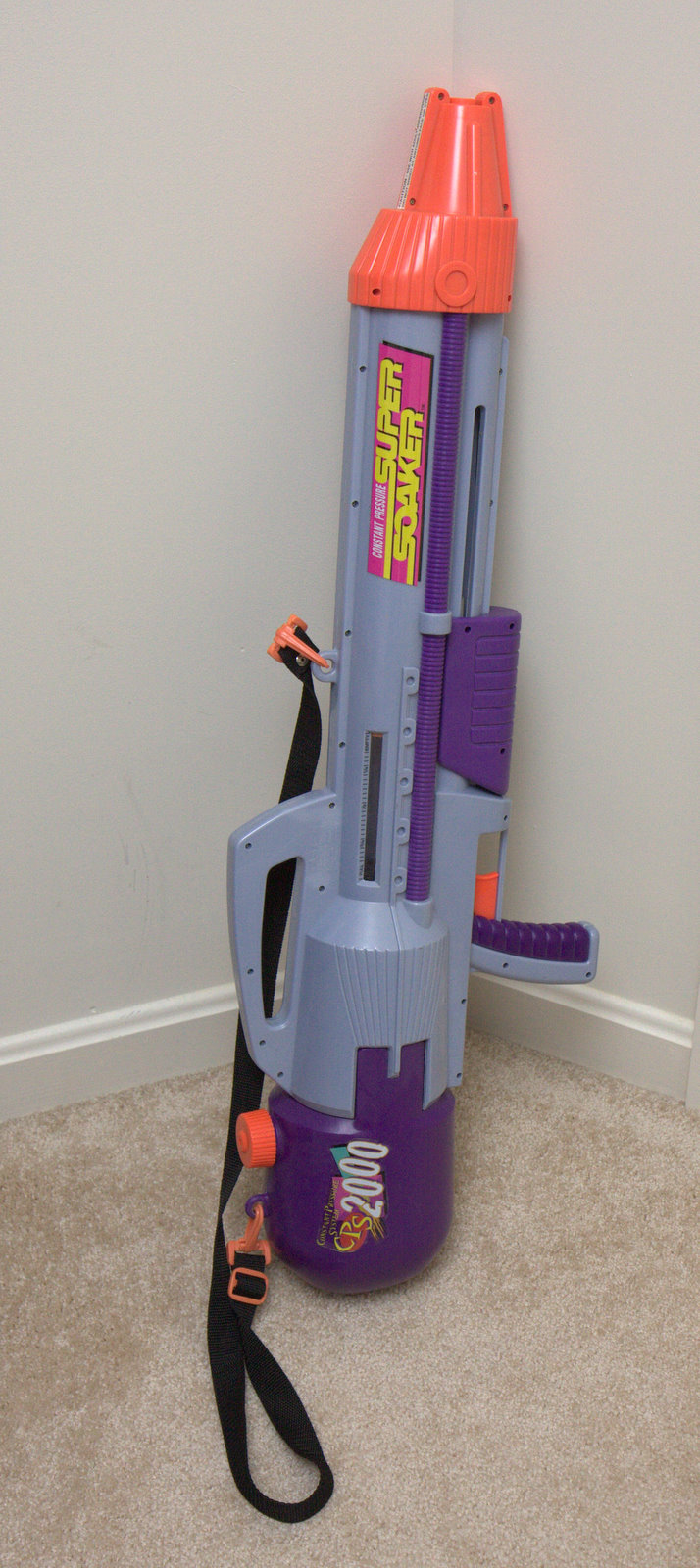
Super Soaker water gun

1. Puppet
2. Twister
3. Super Soaker

Finalists included: American Girl dolls, Battleship, coloring books, Jenga, Playmobil, scooters, Teenage Mutant Ninja Turtles action figures, tops, and Wiffle ball.

=== Class of 2016 ===
The following toys were added in 2016:

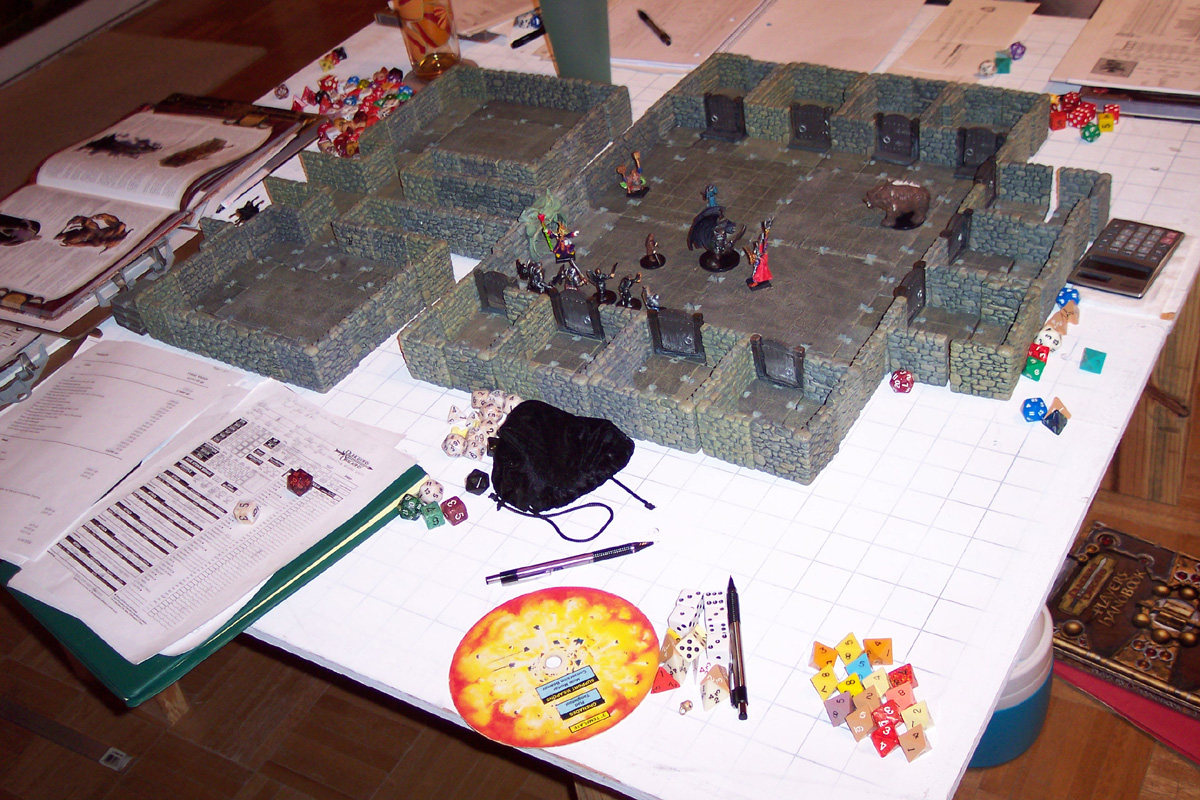
Dungeons & Dragons

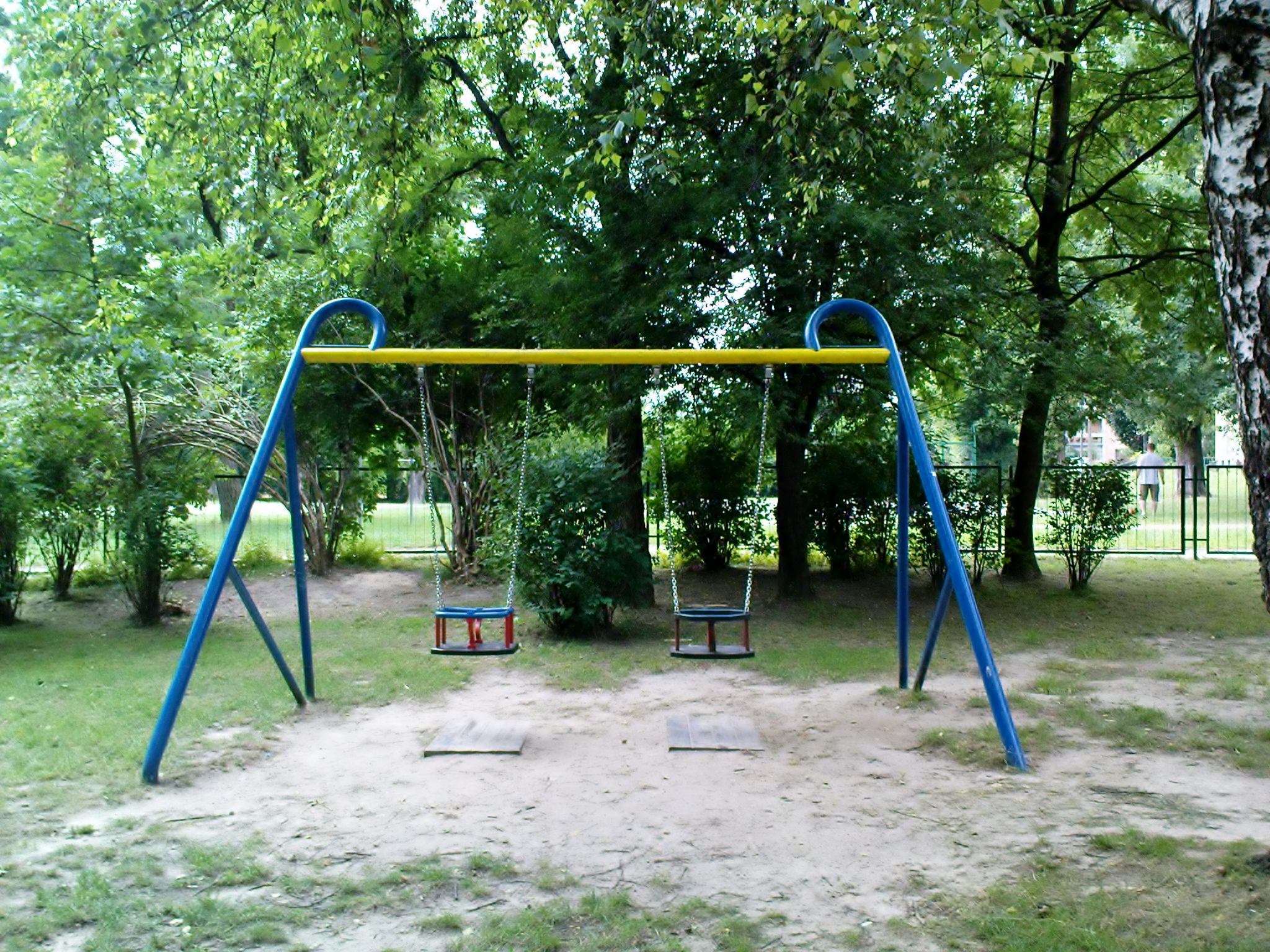
Swings

1. Dungeons & Dragons
2. Little People
3. Swing

Finalists included: bubble wrap, Care Bears, coloring books, Clue, Nerf, pinball, Rock 'Em Sock 'Em Robots, Transformers action figures, and Uno.

=== Class of 2017 ===
Clue board

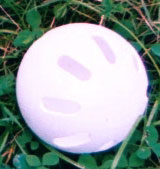
Wiffle ball

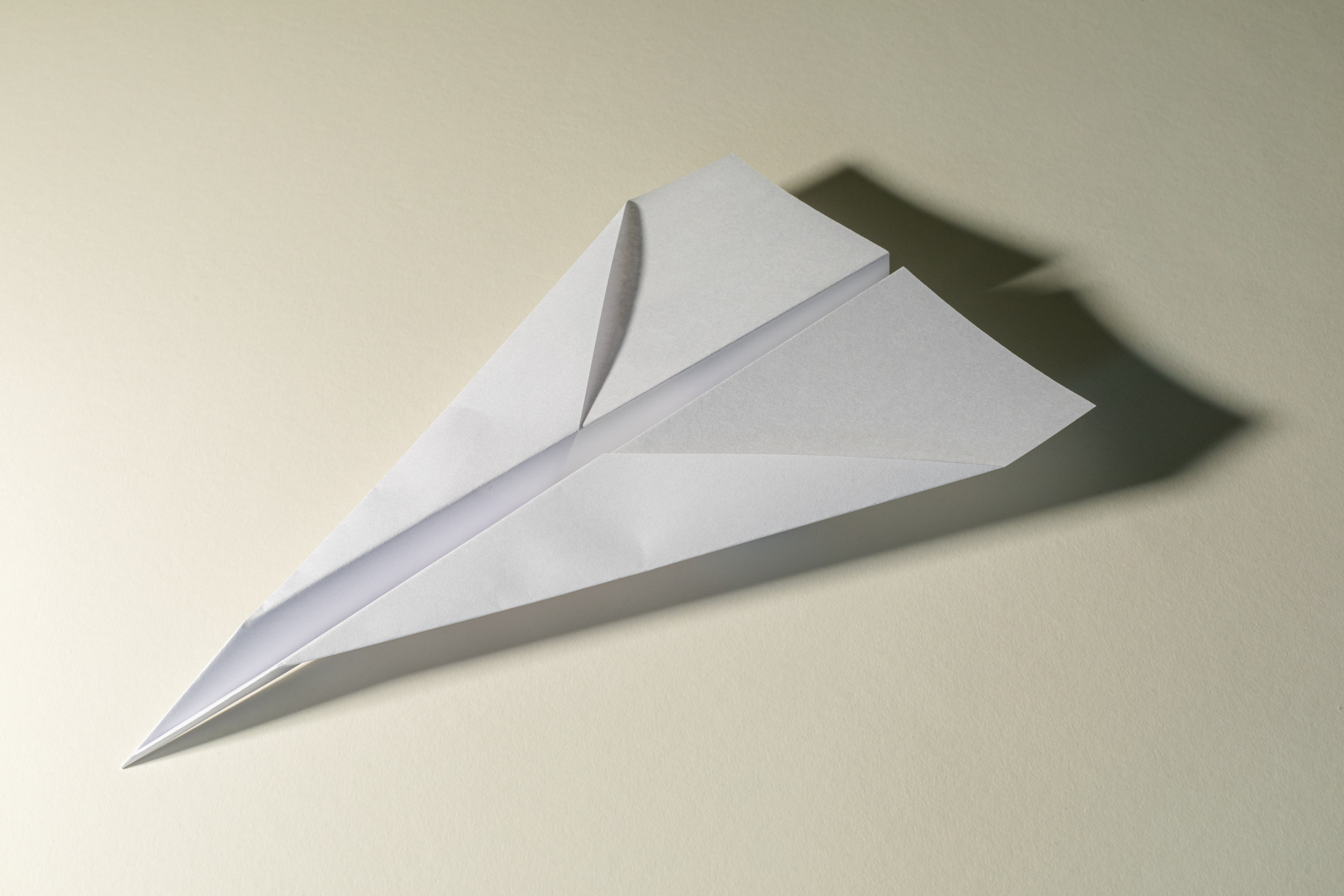
Paper airplane

The following toys were added in 2017:

1. Clue
2. Wiffle ball
3. Paper airplane

Finalists included: Magic 8 Ball, Matchbox model cars, My Little Pony dolls, PEZ candy dispensers, play food, Risk, sand, Transformers action figures, and Uno.

=== Class of 2018 ===
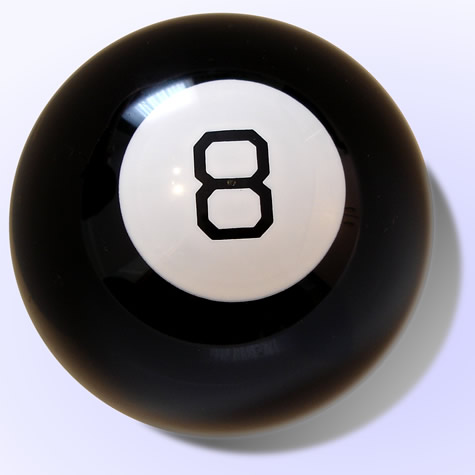
Magic 8-Ball

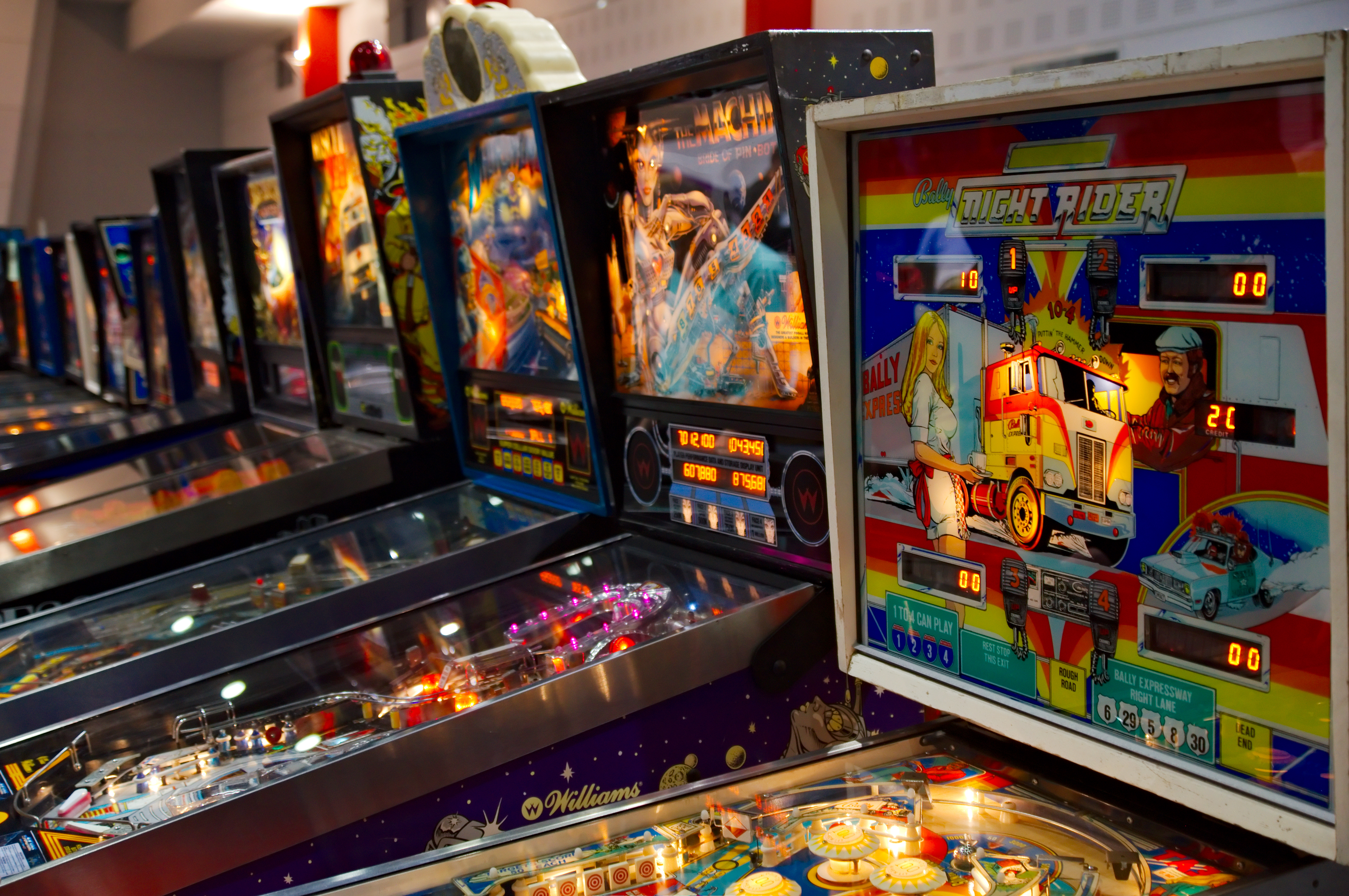
Group of pinball games

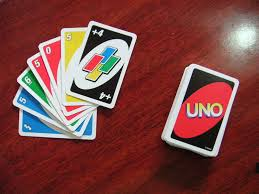
Deck of Uno cards

The following toys were added in 2018:

1. Magic 8 Ball
2. Pinball
3. Uno

Finalists included: American Girl dolls, chalk, Chutes and Ladders, Corn Popper, Flexible Flyer sleds, Masters of the Universe, tic-tac-toe, Tickle Me Elmo, and Tudor Electric Football.

=== Class of 2019 ===
The following toys were added in 2019:

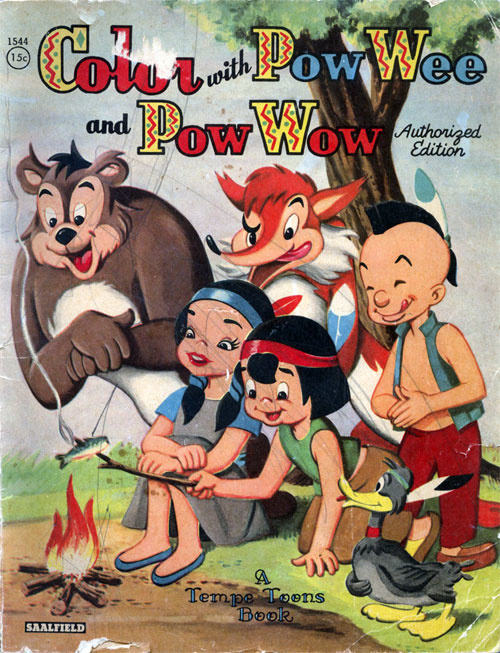
Cover of a coloring book

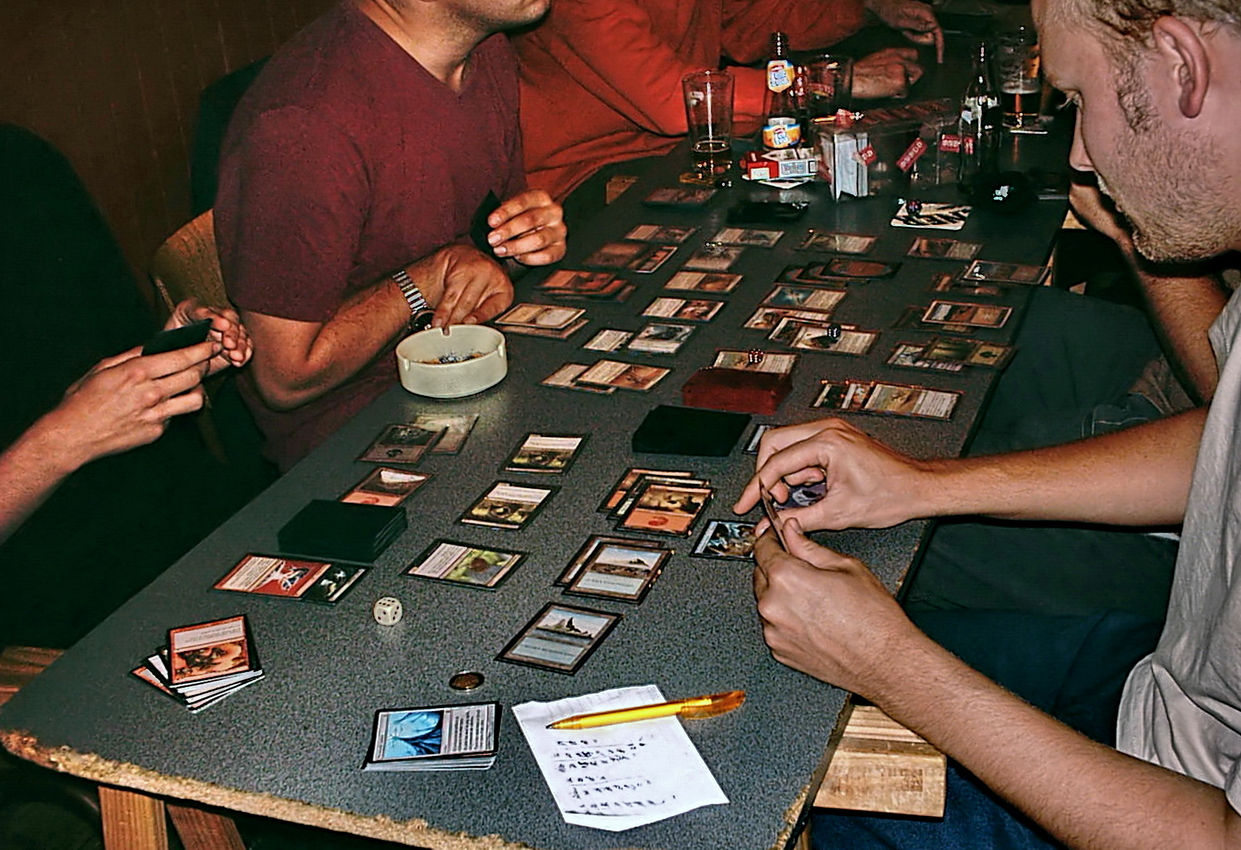
People playing Magic: The Gathering

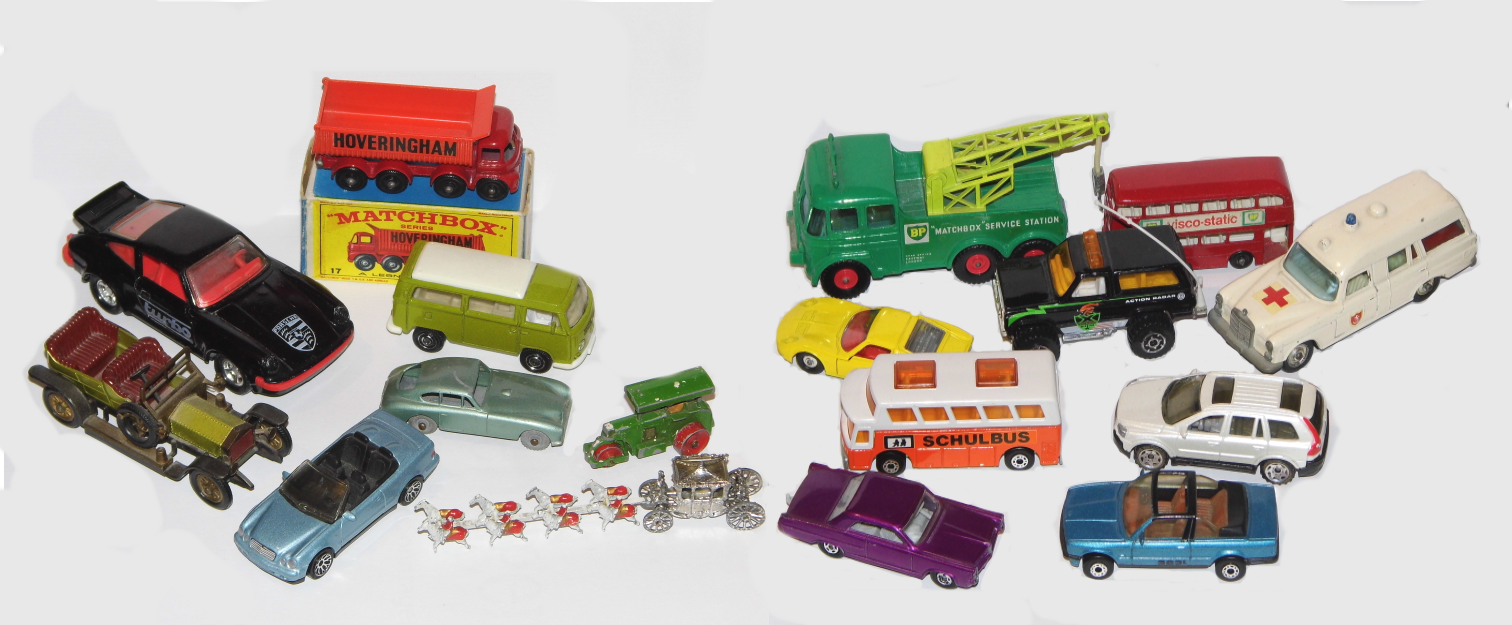
Matchbox model cars

1. Coloring book
2. Magic: The Gathering
3. Matchbox model cars

Finalists included: Care Bears, Corn Popper, Jenga, Masters of the Universe, My Little Pony dolls, Nerf Blaster, Risk, smartphones, and tops.

== 2020s ==
=== Class of 2020 ===
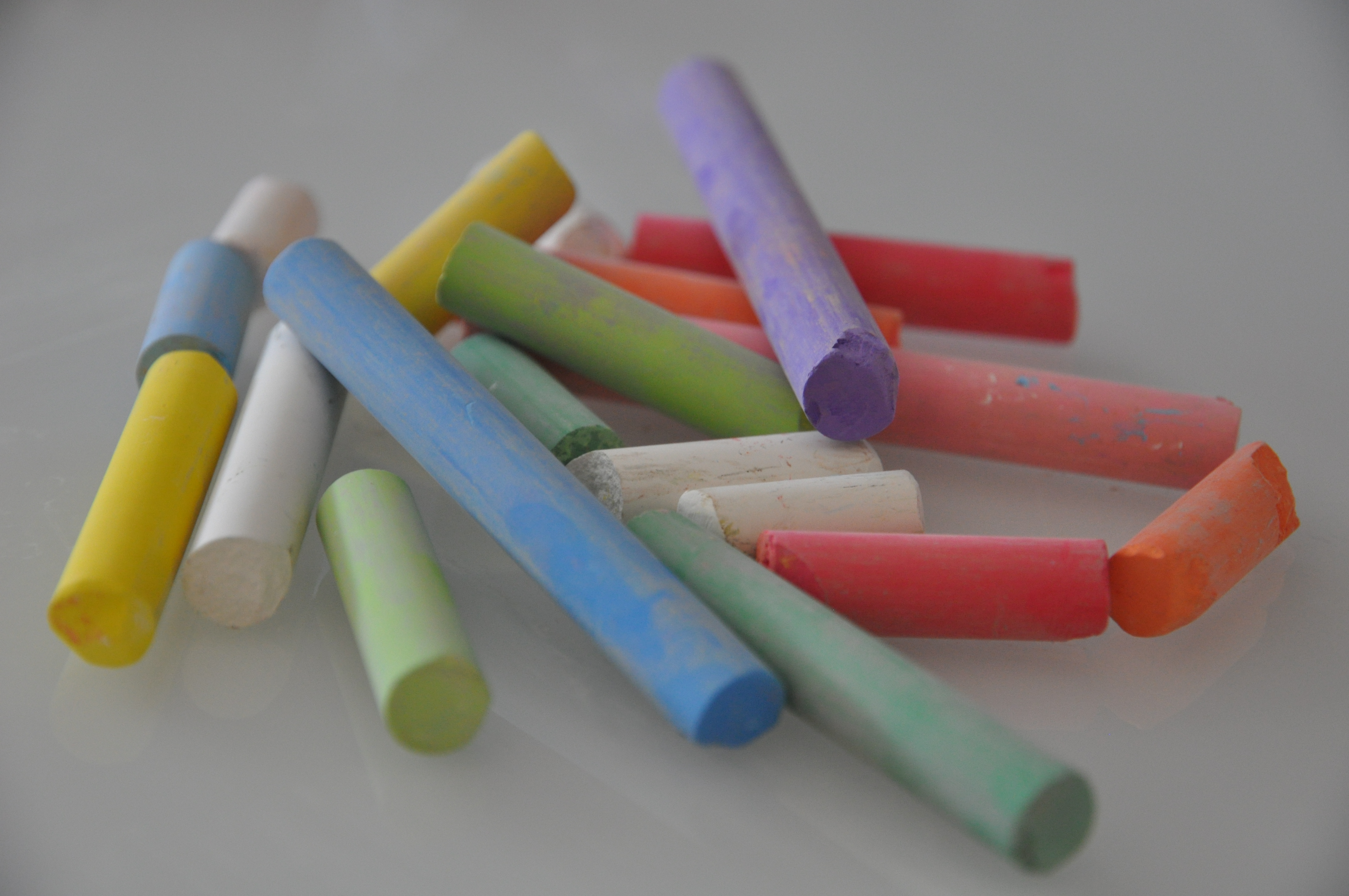
Sidewalk chalk

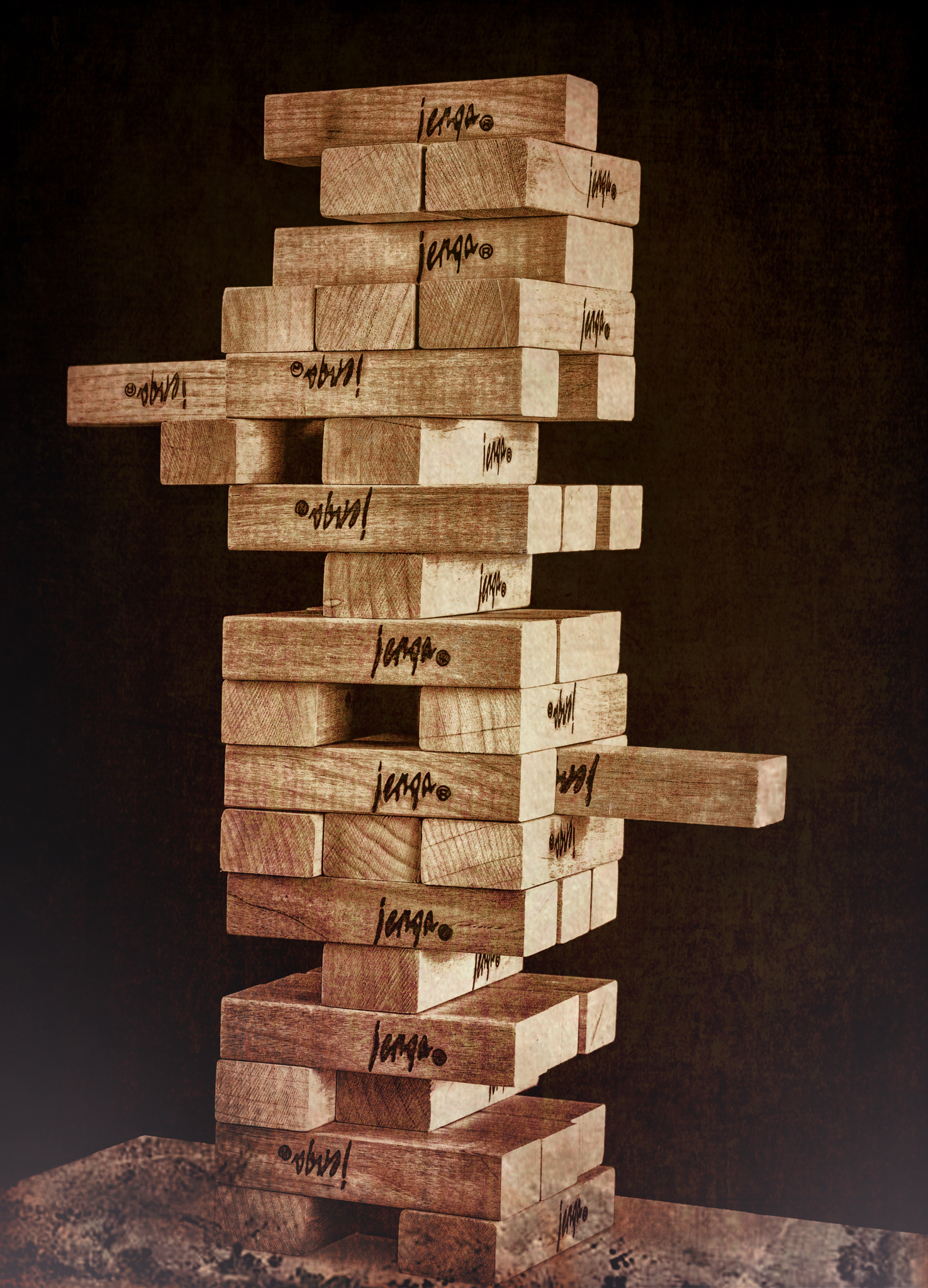
Jenga tower

The following toys were added in 2020:

1. Baby Nancy
2. Sidewalk chalk
3. Jenga

Finalists included: Bingo, Breyer horses, Lite-Brite, Masters of the Universe, My Little Pony dolls, Risk, Sorry!, Tamagotchi, and Yahtzee.

=== Class of 2021 ===
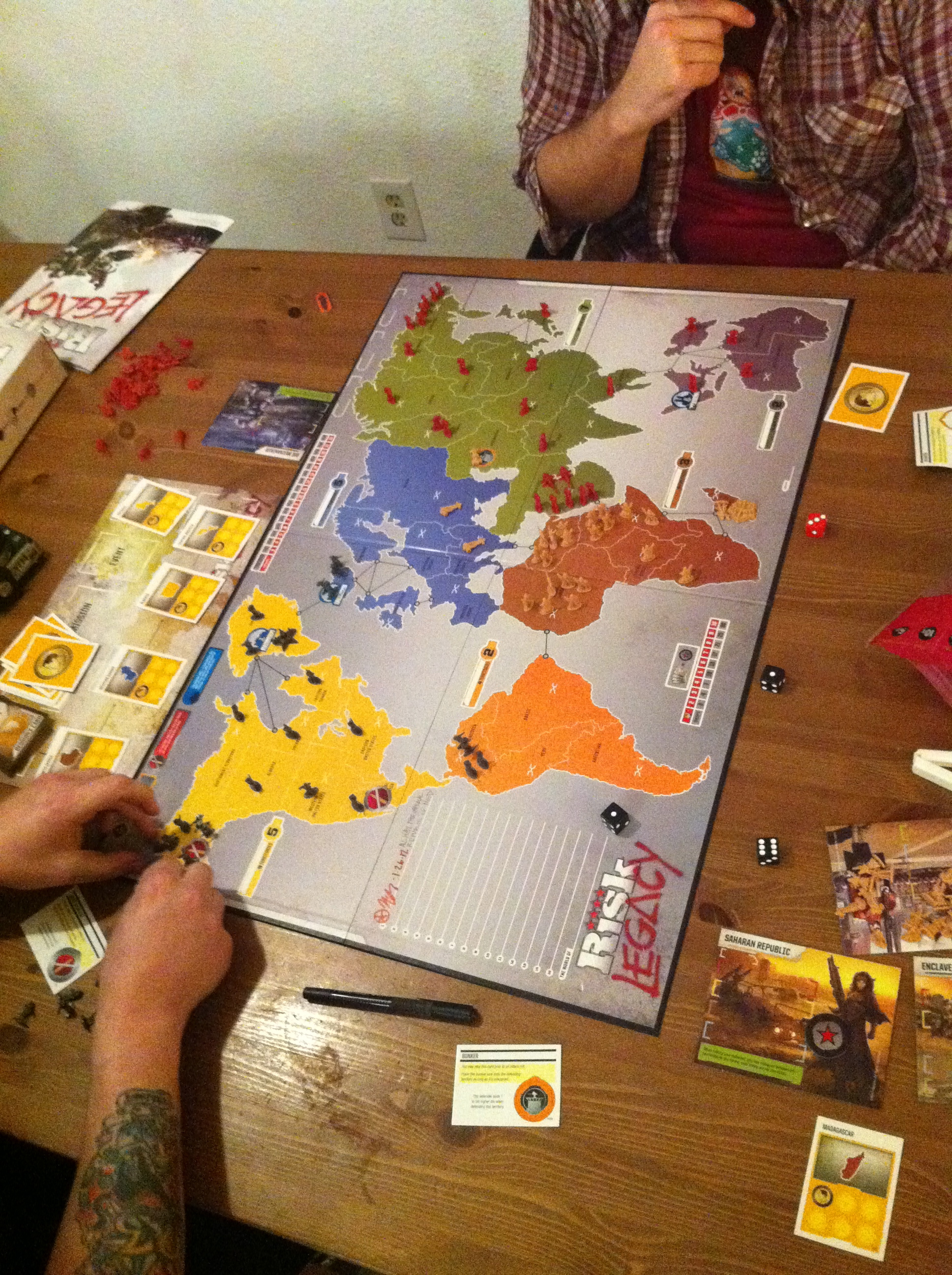
Risk board game

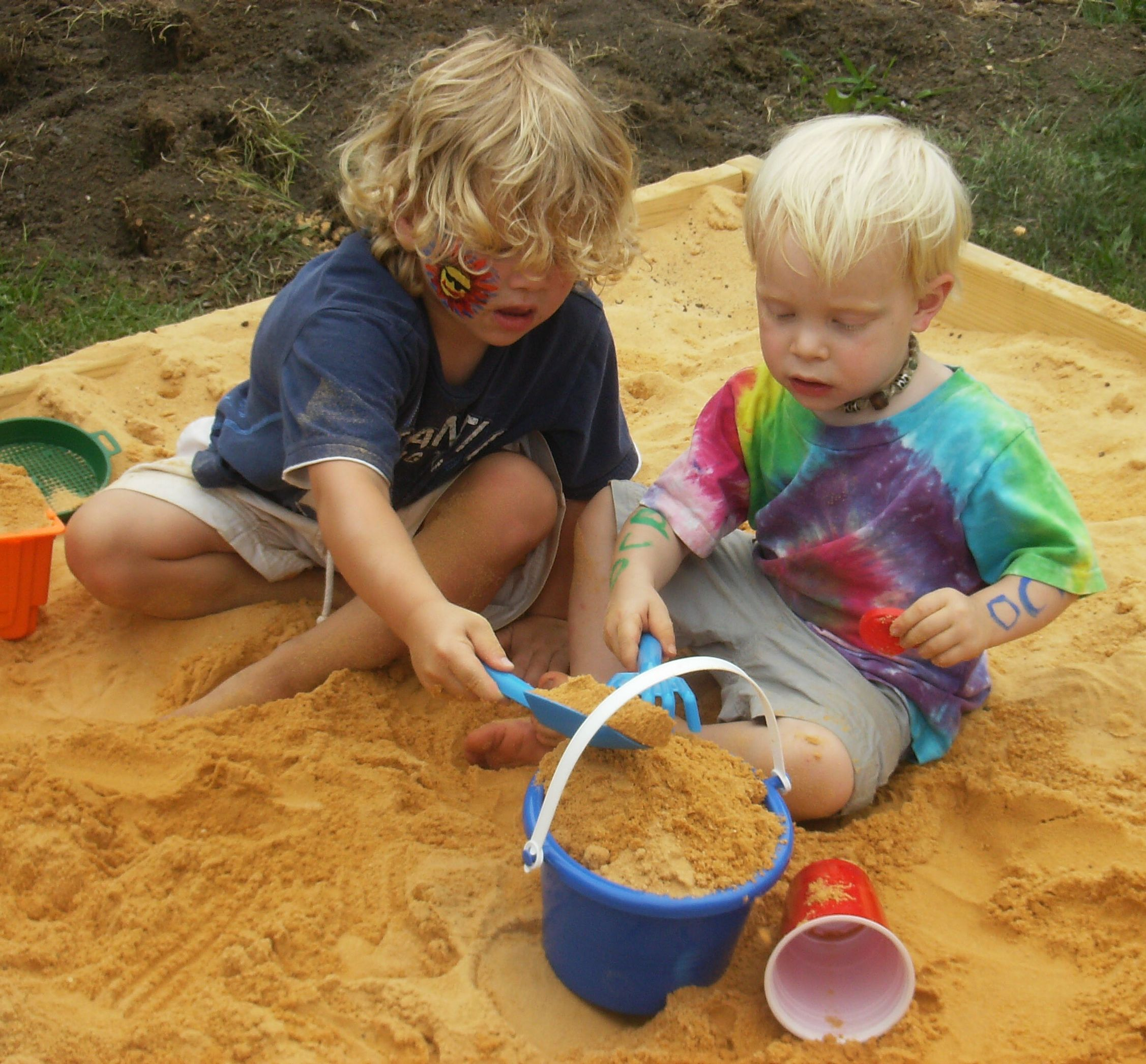
Children in a sandbox

The following toys were added on November 4, 2021:

1. American Girl dolls
2. Risk
3. Sand

Finalists included: Battleship, billiards, Cabbage Patch Kids, Corn Popper, mahjong, Masters of the Universe, piñata, The Settlers of Catan, and the toy fire engine.

=== Class of 2022 ===
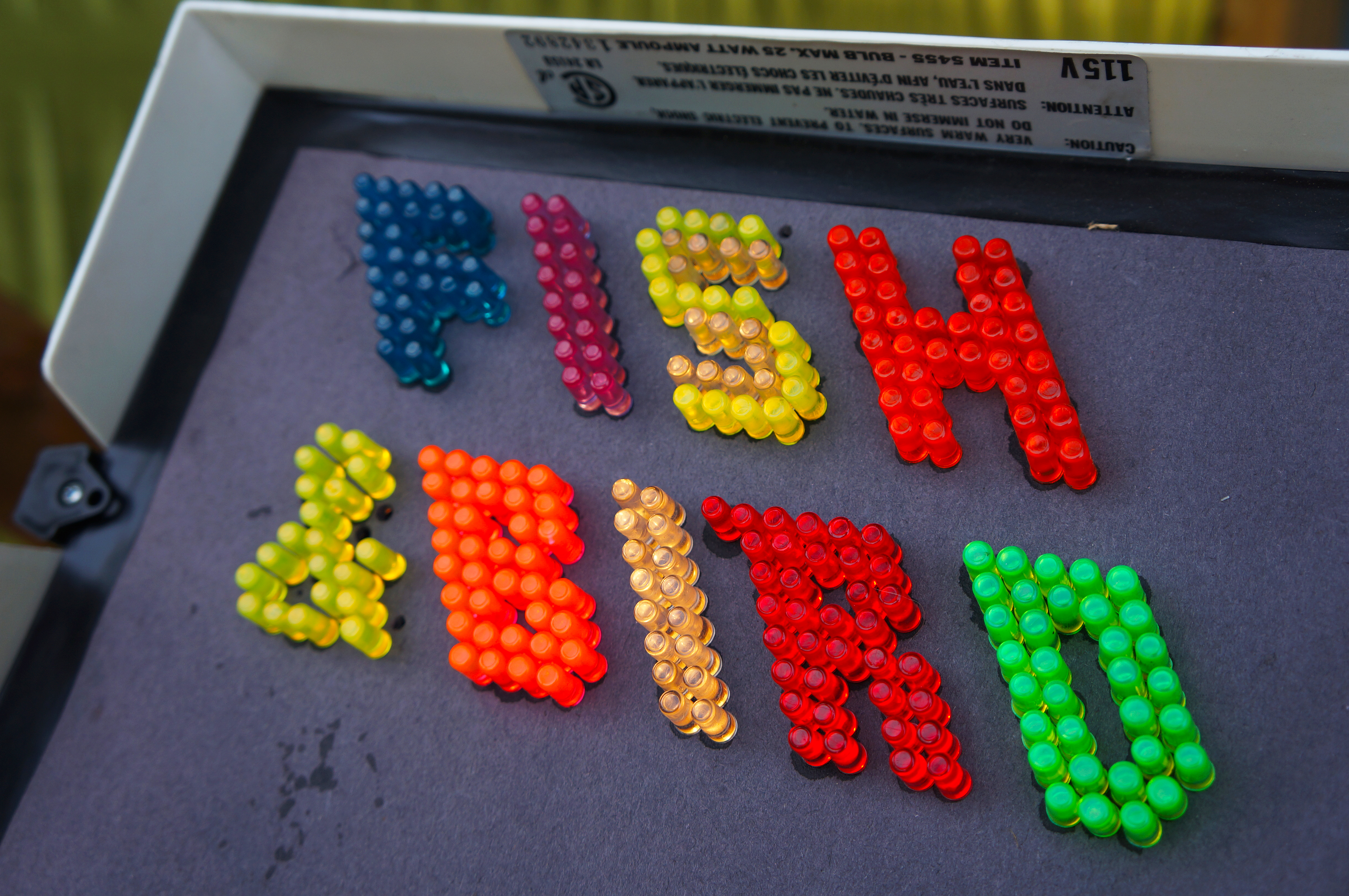
Lite-Brite

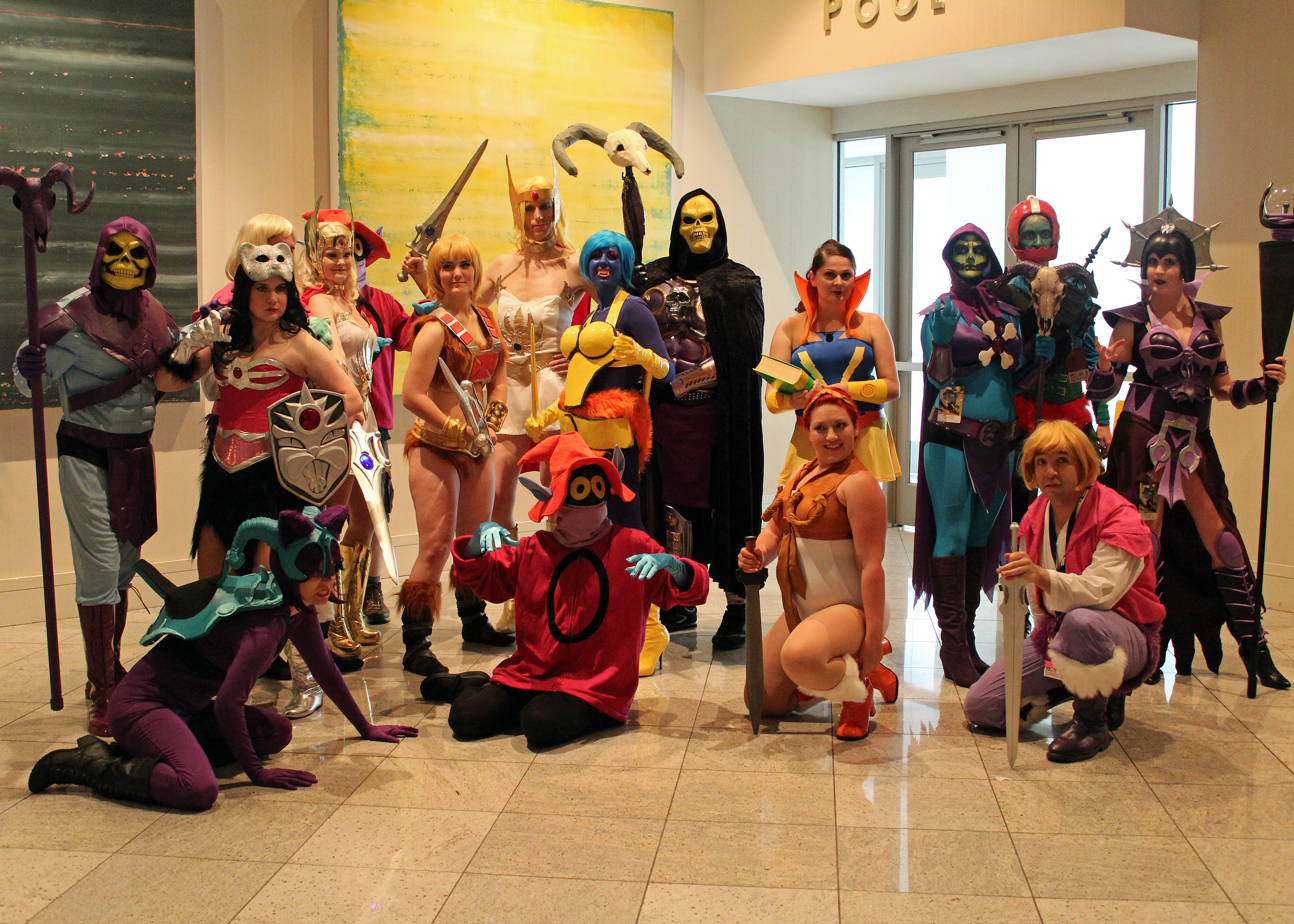
Cosplay of Master of the Universe

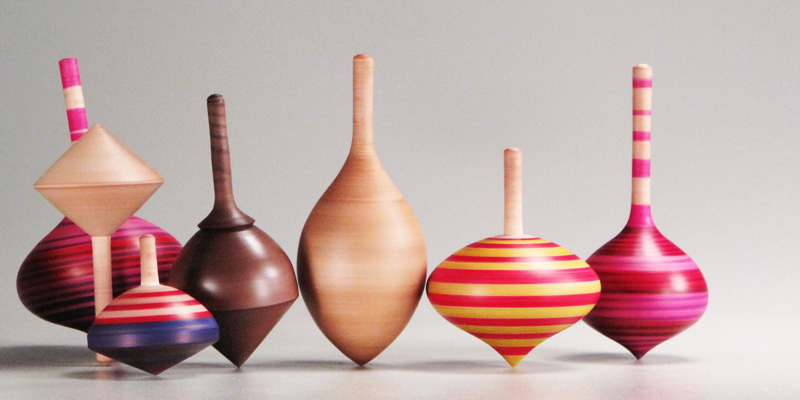
Spinning top

The following toys were added on November 10, 2022:

1. Lite-Brite
2. Masters of the Universe
3. Top

Finalists included: Bingo, Breyer horses, Catan, Nerf, Phase 10, piñata, Pound Puppies, Rack-O, and Spirograph.

=== Class of 2023 ===
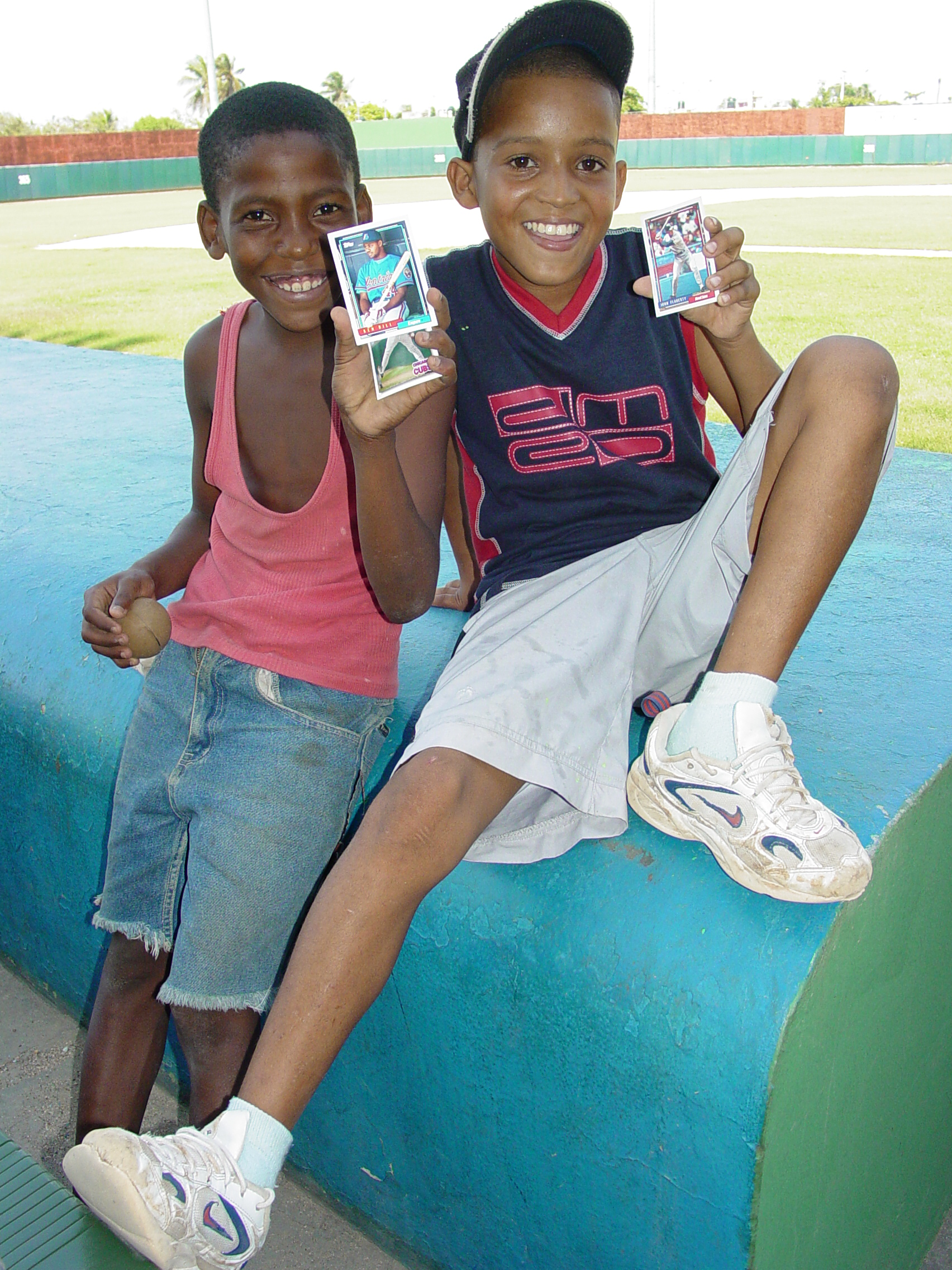
Two boys show off their baseball cards

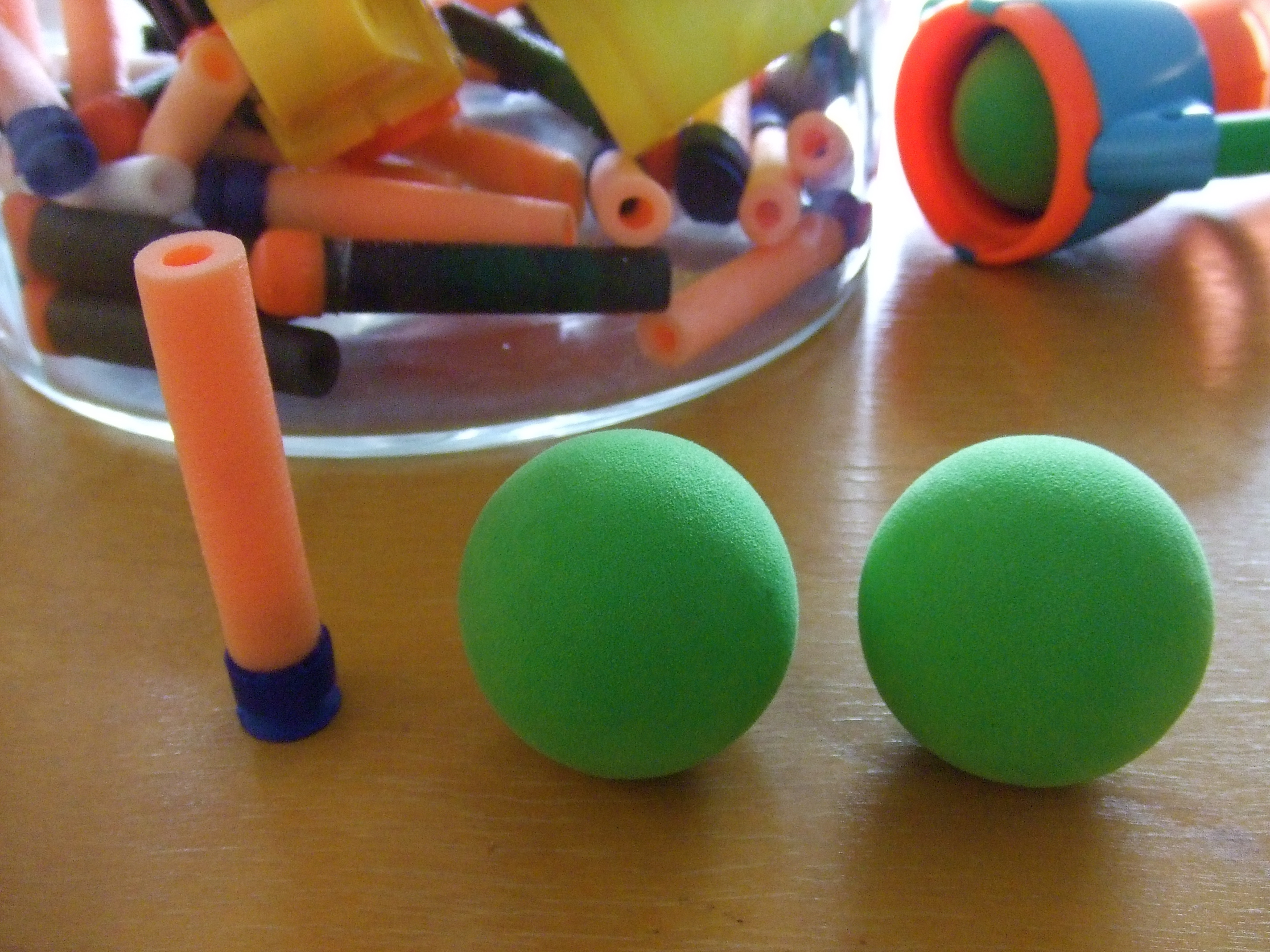
A Nerf dart and two Nerf balls

The following toys were added on November 10, 2023:

1. Baseball cards
2. Cabbage Patch Kids
3. Corn Popper
4. Nerf

Finalists included: Battleship, Bingo, Bop-It, Choose Your Own Adventure books, Connect Four, Ken, Little Tikes Cozy Coupe, slime, and Teenage Mutant Ninja Turtles action figures.

The Fisher-Price Corn Popper was not on the original list of nominees. For the 2023 induction, the Strong highlighted several frequent past finalists as part of a public-driven "Forgotten Five" vote to induct a fourth toy. In addition to the Corn Popper, the other "Forgotten Five" were My Little Pony dolls, PEZ candy dispensers, pogo sticks, and Transformers action figures. Transformers and My Little Pony became finalists in 2024 and were both inducted.

=== Class of 2024 ===
The following were added on November 12, 2024:

- My Little Pony dolls
- Transformers action figures
- Phase 10 card game

Other finalists, announced on September 18, 2024, included Apples to Apples, balloons, Choose Your Own Adventure books, Hess toy trucks, the Pokémon Trading Card Game, remote control vehicles, Sequence, the stick horse, and trampolines.

=== Class of 2025 ===
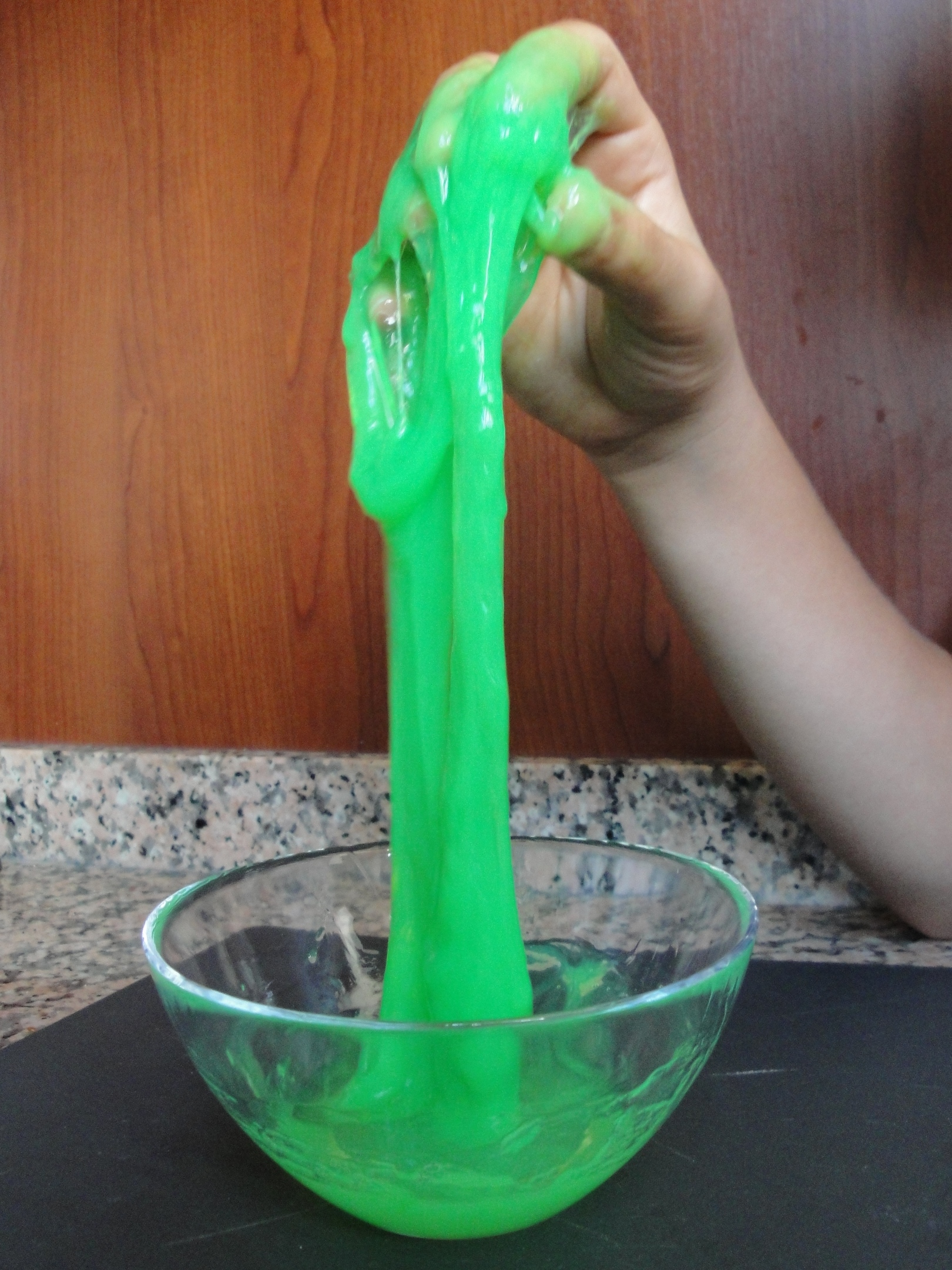
Homemade green slime

The following were added on November 6, 2025:

- Battleship board game
- Trivial Pursuit board game
- Slime (both manufactured and homemade)

The other finalists were Catan, Connect 4, cornhole, Furby, scooter, snow, Spirograph, Star Wars lightsaber, and Tickle Me Elmo.

=== Class of 2026 ===
The following were added on November 5, 2026:

- Bingo
- Care Bears
- Pokémon Trading Card Game
- Slide

The other finalists were Bop It, Mahjong, Monster High dolls, Mouse Trap board game, Polly Pocket, Sorry! board game, Tickle Me Elmo, and Yahtzee.

== See also ==
- Toy Industry Hall of Fame, recognizing the contributions of toy-makers.
- World Video Game Hall of Fame, also operated by and located at The Strong.
- List of toys and children's media awards
