= IXL =

IXL may refer to:

- IXL, Oklahoma, a town in the United States of America
- IXL Historical Museum, a historic building in Hermansville, Michigan, and IXL, a brand of flooring
- Henry Jones IXL, an Australian manufacturer of jams and other foods, and IXL, a brand name
- Kushok Bakula Rimpochee Airport (IATA: IXL), in Leh, Ladakh, India
- A railway interlocking
- A gramogram for the phrase, "I excel"; see Roman numerals § Non-numeric combinations
- IXL Learning, a company that owns various educational software like ABCya and Dictionary.com
- IXL Learning System, an electronic toy made by Fisher-Price and Mattel
