= InteracTV =

Educational electronic toy by Fisher-Price

- Invented by: Fisher-Price
- Company: Fisher-Price (Mattel)
- Country: United States
- Availability: 2004–2007

InteracTV is an electronic device and interface released by Fisher-Price in July 2004, designed for children aged 3 years and up. The product provided a dedicated wireless controller, an InteracTV disc, a programming card and test card (for configuration purposes), and three activity cards. Basically the InteracTV was hooked up to a typical DVD player and television. The activity cards and DVDs made for the product were based on popular children shows for the time, such as Barney & Friends, Dora the Explorer, and SpongeBob SquarePants, which while the video played as normal, allowed the watcher to interact via the controller.

== Product ==
=== Description ===
The InteracTV controller was arch-shaped with a gray plastic frame with a purple-ribbed carrying handle, and red navigational button on each side. The red buttons were to replay and skip video scenes. The device was powered by three AA batteries. The infrared component at the top sent and received signals, acting in some ways like a standard television remote control. Any dedicated card placed as an overlay on the front of the remote had nine touch sensitive areas indicated by icons, for extra navigation, and interactivity with the DVD player and the DVD content.

=== Technology ===
The wireless controller for the InteracTV system used touch screen technology on the front area, while the top transmitted signals via an infrared sensor, using Video Encoded Invisible Light (VEIT) technology. Many of the InteracTV's functions and pre-programmed DVDs were similar in design and setup to the Bubble console developed by Bright Things plc. It was not patented under the DVD game remote controller technology.

=== Educational Goals ===
The idea behind the InteracTV was to allow children to get interactivity and lessons from their favorite TV shows and characters. Learning from fictional character potentially made learning feeling less of a chore, and more intriguing since children could directly relate to them. The questions asked through the activity cards were randomized to ensure the child understood and correctly answered what they learned. With the wireless technology being compatible with most DVDs, it was relatively easy to take the remote and the child's education to another location.

=== Marketing ===
The InteracTV was showcased on February 15, 2004, at the North American International Toy Fair. The product package came at a retail price of $39.99 on release. The additional DVDs specially for the Interact sold for $15 each.

=== Activity DVDs and Cards ===
- Barney (1)
- Blue's Clues (1)
- Clifford's Puppy Days (3)
- Compilation Games Starter Pack (3)
- Dora the Explorer (2)
- Miss Spider's Sunny Patch Friends (3)
- Nickelodeon Triple Play (3)
- Scooby-Doo! (1)
- Sesame Street (3)
- SpongeBob SquarePants (3)

== Reception ==
PCMag rated the product with 4 out of 5 stars, praising the remote for its efficient signal reception, and the programs leading kids on the right track to answering questions. Arno Steinwender from Spieltest focused on how children could engage with their favorite characters, but found that the product could potentially turn preschoolers into couch potatoes through increased time spent watching TV.
