= Arthur Holt =

Arthur Holt may refer to:

- Arthur Holt (politician) (1914–1995), British Liberal Party politician and MP
- Arthur Holt (sportsman) (1911–1994), English cricketer for Hampshire, who also played football with Southampton
- Arthur Holt (1921–1996), inventor of the Fisher-Price Corn Popper toy
