= Adventure People =

American toy series

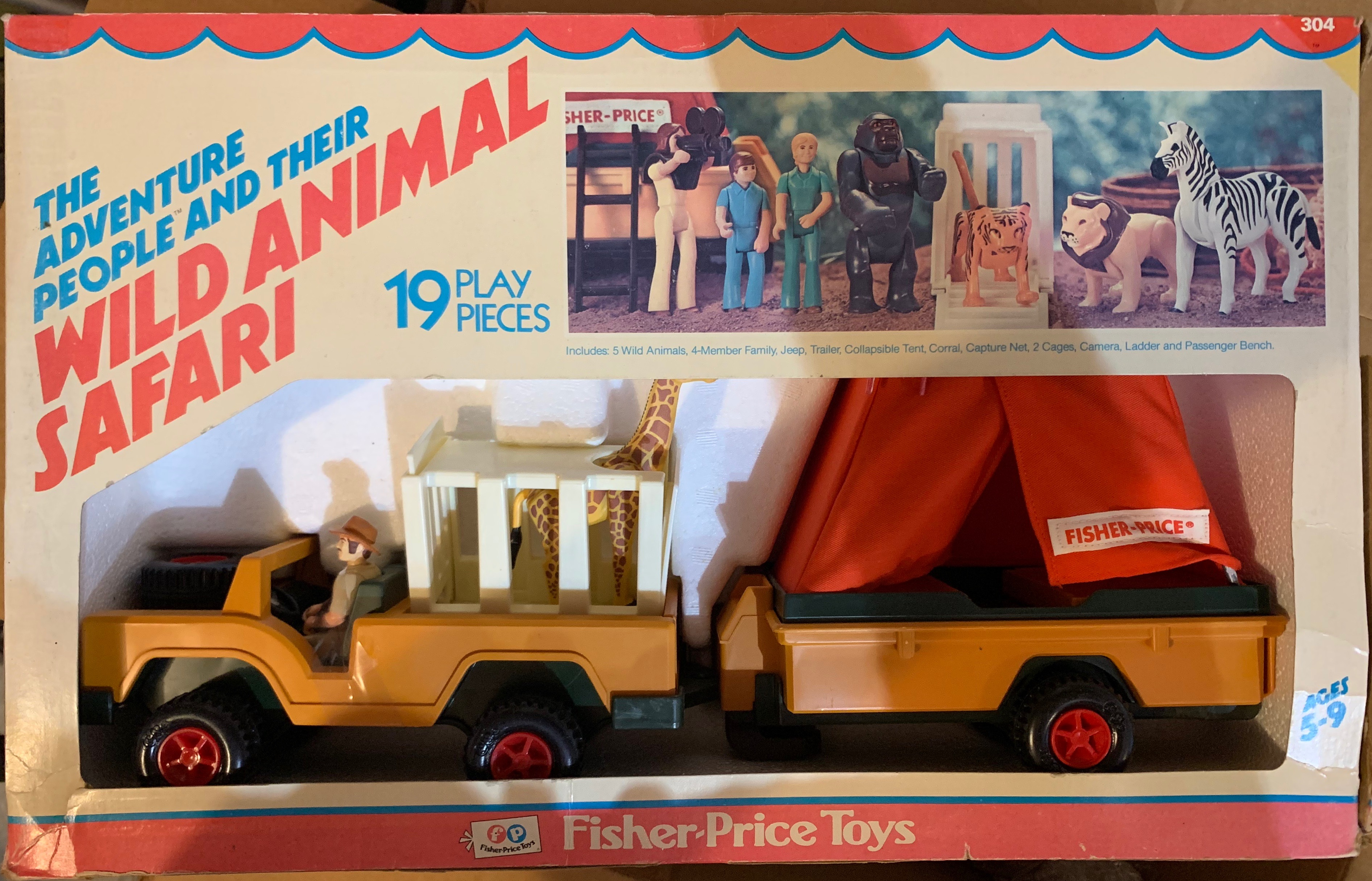
Fisher-Price Adventure People Set #304 Wild Animal Safari

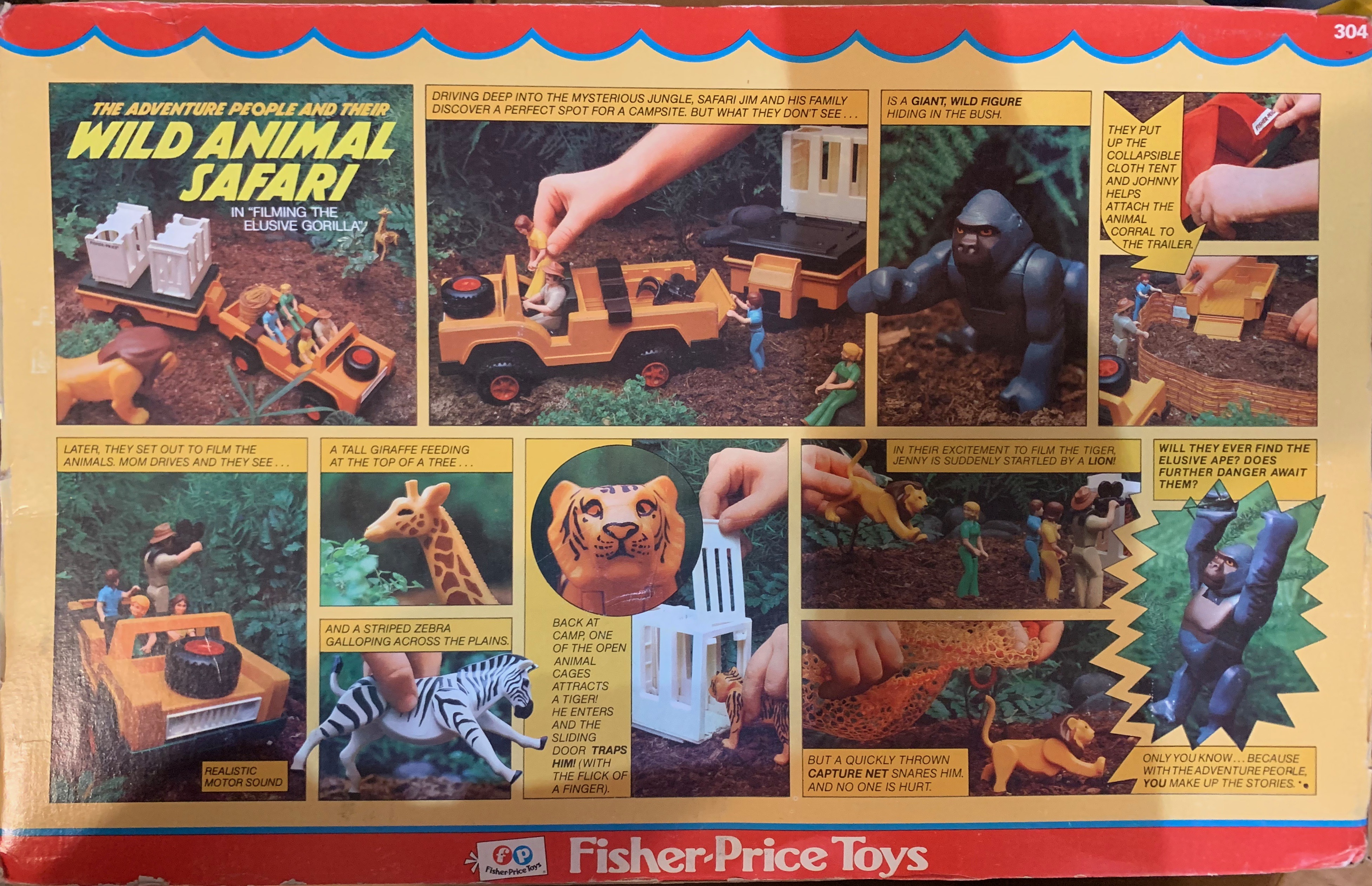
Obverse Original Box

Adventure People was a toy series introduced by Fisher-Price in 1975. The line lasted through 1985 and was targeted towards 4-9 year olds. Serving as an alternative to G.I. Joe and other similarly themed action figures, they utilized the 3.75 inch size which was made famous by Kenner's Star Wars line. The designers of the early Kenner Star Wars action figures used Adventure People to help conceptualize how the figures would look. The Adventure People line featured "real life" heroes and adventurers such as park rangers, scuba divers, astronauts, and emergency workers, as well as a number of science fiction-themed figures including aliens and robots.

As both lines were made by Fisher Price, the Adventure People were similar to the smaller Construx figures with jointed hips and shoulders, but unlike the Construx figures, their hands were configured in the "open/grasping" form, with the thumbs and index fingers in a "C" shape. They can be distinguished from similar figurines, such as Tonka Play People, by the "FISHER-PRICE TOYS" inscription cast on the inside of either the left or right leg.

== Sets ==
Sets include:

- Adventure People Northwoods Trailblazer, manufactured from 1977 to 1982
- The Adventure People Daredevil Sports Van, manufactured from 1978 to 1982
- The Adventure People DareDevil Sport Plane, manufactured from 1975 to 1980
- The Adventure People Cycle Racing Team, manufactured from 1977 to 1984
- The Adventure People Wilderness Patrol, manufactured from 1975 to 1979
- The Adventure People Emergency Rescue truck, manufactured from 1975 to 1978
- The Adventure People Deep Sea Diver, manufactured from 1980 to 1984
- The Adventure People FireStar 1, manufactured from 1980 to 1984
