= Helen Schelle =

American businessperson

Helen M. Schelle (1893 in Piqua, Ohio – 12 April 1984 in Piqua, Ohio) was co-founder of the toy manufacturing company Fisher-Price. Schelle was born in Piqua, Ohio and moved to New York as an adult, where, by the middle of the 1920s, she had become owner and manager of the Penny Walker Toy Shop in Binghamton. This role saw Schelle established as a prominent and connected figure within the toy industry and in 1930, she was asked by financier Irving Price to join him as a partner in a new toy company he was starting. Alongside businessman Herman Fisher and Price's wife, Illustrator Margaret Evans Price, the Fisher-Price Company was formally established later that year in East Aurora, New York. Schelle undertook the role of secretary and treasurer. She resided in a cottage just outside the town, and also owned a farm.

Many of the company's early toys were the result of a collaboration between Schelle and Margaret Price, who together worked on their designs. Sixteen wooden toys were brought to the 1931 American International Toy Fair in New York City before later being introduced to the public through Macy's Department store. The toys' first year on the American market saw their placement on shelves in hundreds of stores throughout the country— an achievement partially attributed to Schelle's established contacts within the toy industry.

Schelle retired from Fisher-Price in 1957 and moved from New York back to her hometown of Piqua, Ohio. She died there on April 12, 1984, at the age of 91 and is buried at the Forest Hill Union Cemetery.
