= Tornado Tube =

Device for connecting two soda bottles

The Tornado Tube is a device made of molded plastic that can be used to connect two two-liter soda bottles. When one of the bottles is filled with liquid and the two bottles are connected with a Tornado Tube, they may be used as a children's educational toy demonstrating a vortex.

The device was accidentally invented in 1968 by Craig Burnham for a school science fair project as an attempt to create an hour glass with water. When the original concept failed to function, a frustrated shake created a vortex in the bottle rather than a slow drip. In late 1986, the device was reimagined as a toy, at which point prototypes were constructed from plastic and a U.S. patent was granted. The toy debuted at the 1988 American International Toy Fair Originally constructed of household materials, the retail toy is made from molded plastic produced in southern New Hampshire. The toy has been produced in the United States since 1988 and millions of units have been sold across the world, with its popularity peaking in the late 1990s.

A similar effect may be achieved by duct taping two soda bottles together.
