= Jim Marggraff =

American entrepreneur and inventor (born 1958)

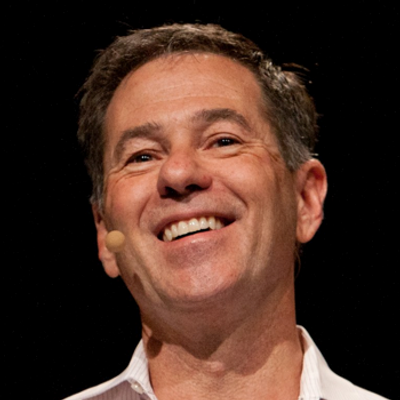
- Born: June 4, 1958 (age 68)
- Education: Massachusetts Institute of Technology (BS, MS)
- Spouse: MJ Marggraff
- Children: 2

Lewis James “Jim” Marggraff (born June 4, 1958) is an American entrepreneur and inventor. He is the inventor of the LeapPad and the founder and CEO of Kibeam Learning.

== Education ==
Marggraff spent his college years at the Massachusetts Institute of Technology (MIT). While at MIT, Marggraff earned bachelor's and master's degrees in electrical engineering and computer science.

== Business career ==
Marggraff’s first company, StrataCom, was sold to Cisco for $4.5 billion in 1996. With his second company, Explore Technologies, Marggraff and his team invented the Odyssey Atlasphere, an interactive globe. Explore Technologies was sold to LeapFrog Enterprises in 1998 and Marggraff went to work for the company. While at LeapFrog, Marggraff invented the LeapPad Learning System. He also founded Livescribe, which invented the smart pen, and Eyefluence, an eye-tracking technology company that made AR and VR applications. Eyefluence was acquired by Google in 2016.

In 2011, Marggraff was named Entrepreneur of the Year for Technology in Northern California by Ernst & Young.

Marggraff is the CEO of Kibeam, a company that creates educational and communicational products for children.

=== StrataCom ===
Marggraff was a founding engineer of StrataCom. StrataCom supplied Asynchronous Transfer Mode, Frame Relay, and network switching equipment. The company also produced the FastPacket, the first commercial cell switch. Marggraff has claimed that this technological trio enables for global computer connection, as well as reliable high speed connection.

=== Explore Technologies ===
After learning that one in seven Americans could not locate the United States on an unmarked map, Marggraff, his MIT roommate, and another friend created the Odyssey Atlasphere, a globe that would talk to its user and deliver facts when touched with a complementary stylus. The Odyssey Atlasphere attracted the attention of LeapFrog Enterprises, which acquired Explore Technologies in 1998.

=== LeapFrog ===
When his two children were learning to read at home, Marggraff conceived the idea of taking the touch-responsive surface of the Odyssey and flattening it to be used as paper in books. The result was the LeapFrog LeapPad. The educational tool debuted in 1999 and from 2001 to 2002, it was the highest selling toy on the market in the United States.

=== Livescribe ===
After leaving LeapFrog in 2005, Marggraff formed his next company, Livescribe, in 2007. The company used paper-based computing platforms to create the first line of smart pens, which were ballpoint pens with embedded computer and digital audio recording systems. The first edition of the smart pen, the Pulse, was released in October 2008. New editions of the pen have been released, with the most recent being the Livescribe 3. The company was acquired by Anoto in 2015.

=== Eyefluence ===
Eyefluence was founded by Marggraff in 2013. The company developed eye-tracking and eye-interactive technology for use in augmented, mixed, and virtual reality devices. In 2016, Eyefluence was acquired by Google.

=== Kibeam ===
Marggraff is the founding CEO of Kibeam (formerly named Kinoo), a company that focuses on children’s educational tools. Kibeam partnered with the Lastinger Center at the University of Florida in Gainseville to boost literacy as part of a research pilot in 2023.

== Rotary and volunteering ==
Marggraff is a member of the Lamorinda Sunrise Rotary Club in Lamorinda, California. He was named “Rotarian of the Year” in 2018 by the club.

Marggraff Executive produced a film made for virtual reality titled "One Small Act" as part of a partnership between Google and Rotary. The film was released at the Rotary International Convention in 2017.

In his keynote address at the 2018 Rotary Convention, Marggraff told the story of how the LeapPad helped educate thousands of women in Afghanistan. In 2004, the company was contacted by the former US Secretary of Health and Human Services, Tommy Thompson, to create LeapPads for Afghan women. The LeapPads created by Marggraff and his team used the Pashto and Dari languages and contained stories that educated women on topics such as immunization and spacing pregnancies; 20,000 of these LeapPads were sent to health centers in Afghanistan.

Marggraff is a member of the board of directors for the Team Gleason Foundation, a non-profit organization raising funds and awareness for ALS. It was started by former NFL player Steve Gleason after he was diagnosed with ALS in 2011.

== Personal life ==
Marggraff has been married to his wife, MJ, since 1988. Together, they have two children, Blake and Annie. In 2004, Marggraff was named “Father of the Year” by the National Father’s Day Council.

MJ Marggraff, Jim Marggraff’s wife, has a doctoral degree from USC and is a trained pilot. In 2016, she published Finding the Wow: How Dreams Take Flight at Midlife.

In 2011, Marggraff’s son, Blake, along with fellow high school classmate Matthew Feddersen, won the Intel International Science and Engineering Fair for their work with an experimental cancer treatment.

While attending Washington University in St. Louis, Marggraff’s daughter, Annie, founded the Bear Cubs Running Team, an athletic club for people on the autism spectrum.
