= IXL Learning System =

Educational electronic toy by Fisher-Price

iXL Learning System
- Invented by: Fisher-Price
- Company: Fisher-Price (Mattel)
- Country: United States
- Availability: 2010–2012
- Slogan: "The iPad for kids"

iXL Learning System is a multi-purpose handheld electronic device released by Fisher-Price in July 2010, designed for children aged 3 to 6 years. It functions as an e-reader, gaming console, graphic editor, picture viewer, notebook, and audio player. The product came with readily installed applications, a software CD, and a USB cable. A recharging station module could be bought separately as an add-on to power up the iXL instead of batteries, and a storage case was also available to carry, store and protect the device.

== Product ==
=== Description ===
The iXL had the shape of a pocketbook with white and silver clamshell casing, an outer decal, a CD slot with an eject button, a headphone jack on the front right side, an in-built speaker with volume control, two buttons, a QVGA color touchscreen, an attached stylus, and a memory card slot. The color scheme of the outer decal, stylus, speaker, and action button was gray, blue or pink. The device was powered by four AA batteries. The screen could be used either in portrait or landscape orientation, and tilting could flip the pages of an e-book. Up to six accounts could be created on the device, and six readily available activities could be played. The preinstalled software included one story (with free mode and story mode), one game, and one music sample.

=== Educational Goals ===
The iXL, while having less features than a standard smartphone or tablet came at a cost effective price with a variety of applications provided to allow children to experiment and learn. The included features allowed the user to pick up on reading, spelling, vocabulary, comprehension, and counting, as well as exercise creativity in art Generally the device would keep children entertained for several hours, and would potentially help them develop their motor and handwriting skills.

=== Marketing ===
Competing with Leapfrog Enterprises' Leapster, the iXL product package came at a retail price of $79.99.

=== Discs ===
- Batman (2010)
- Cars 2 (2011)
- Disney Princess (2010)
- Dora the Explorer 3D (2011)
- Green Lantern 3D (2011)
- Handy Manny (2010)
- Imaginext Dinosaurs (2010)
- Kung Fu Panda 3D (2011)
- Mickey Mouse Clubhouse (2011)
- Penguins of Madagascar (2010)
- Nihao Kai-lan (2010)
- Scooby-Doo! (2010)
- Shrek (2010)
- SpongeBob SquarePants (2010)
- Toy Story 3 (2010)

== Reception ==
The iXL was praised by a Sooper Articles toy reviewer for its application variety, easy navigation, the ability to use more than one application simultaneously, and the quick process of adding audio files, all of which made the device versatile with the right amount of software. The device was nominated for the Educational Toy of the Year, Innovative Toy of the Year, and Preschool Toy of the Year awards at the Toy Fair 2011.

=== Lawsuit ===
In 2010, both Mattel and Fisher-Price were sued for a trademark breach and unfair competition by IXL Learning (formerly Quia Web) for using the name iXL from their product. The plaintiff claimed that they lost sales for their math program, due to the defendants capitalizing on search engine tags, leading to the Fisher Price product and not IXL Learning's. By mid 2011, the district court judge ruled there was no evidence of monetary losses and web traffic diverted from the plaintiff's website was inadequate, concluding that the defendant's actions led to confusion and not diversion. In the end, both parties settled out of court with confidential terms of agreement.
