= Computer Cool School =

Educational electronic toy by Fisher-Price

- Pink variant of Computer Cool School
- Invented by: Fisher-Price
- Company: Fisher-Price (Mattel)
- Country: United States
- Availability: 2008–2011

Computer Cool School is a plug-and-play electronic toy released by Fisher-Price in July 2008, designed for children aged 3 to 6 years, and supervised by child research manager Kathleen Kremer. Development required Fisher-Price to ask particular questions to aid in their research. The product took the form of a boxed multi-function keyboard peripheral, with an in-built tablet and stylus and an installation CD provided. The software and peripheral were compatible on Windows computers. Adult guidance was needed to install and set up the device and application. The products were released under the Fun 2 Learn brand. A pink version of the product was released in 2009 to cater exclusively to girl users. By 2011, the toyline was discontinued.

== Product ==
=== Description ===
The product came in the form of a colored keyboard peripheral with a tablet and stylus attached for writing and drawing, and connected by a USB cable. In addition to the QWERTY keys, the keyboard came with five buttons to navigate between learning centers, and a globe rolling switch to launch a field trip. Provided with the peripherals were special flash cards, which allowed users to trace them on the tablet. Any written material could be printed. The application Leo's Classroom was included on the installation CD. Even with the peripherals active, the player could still use the standard keyboard and the mouse. Connection to the internet allowed for software updates.

=== Marketing ===
Upon its release, the Computer Cool School retailed at $60. In a span of two years, 10 purchasable edutainment software CDs acting as expansion packs were released with themes based on popular children's animated series around the time (such as Nickelodeon cartoons), generally aimed at pre-schoolers to primary schoolchildren. Each CD was sold for $15.

=== Educational goals ===
The product was designed to emulate a classroom environment on the computer, introducing children to computer usage without any risk to computer infrastructure. It helped children get a feel of the QWERTY keyboard layout and encouraged them to take notes while learning. Educational topics in each software package included Reading and Writing, Mathematics, Art, Music, and Basic Science. Art tools incorporated in the software included backgrounds, stamps, erase, and colors. Other skills children could pick up were Phonics, Vocabulary, Uppercase and Lowercase Letters, Matching, and Problem-solving. Activities that utilize the keyboard can guide the player by lighting up the corresponding keys to lead them on the right track. Passing the individual classes rewarded the player with printable certificates to give a sense of achievement. The cards provided, acted as letter and number templates being traceable under the writing tablet cover to allow children to practice their writing skills with the stylus. The stylus was able to cater for both right and left-handed users. Safety features on the software via a parental control lock, ensured the user did not stray from learning and prevented unwanted distractions.

=== Software ===
- Computer Cool School: Clifford the Big Red Dog (2008)
- Computer Cool School: DC Super Friends (2010)
- Computer Cool School: Leo's Dinosaur Adventure (2009)
- Computer Cool School: Nickelodeon Dora and Diego (2008)
- Computer Cool School: Nickelodeon Wonder Pets! (2009)
- Computer Cool School: Nihao Kai-Lan (2009)
- Computer Cool School: Scooby-Doo! (2008)
- Computer Cool School: Sesame Street Elmo (2008)
- Computer Cool School: SpongeBob SquarePants (2008)
- Computer Cool School: Super Why (2009)

== Reception ==
One author of People bought the game and was impressed with its ease of installation, user-friendly navigation, the ability to print activities to take learning on the go, the interest it retained for the player, and its kid-friendly introduction to a computer. By December, it was recommended by the ABC News as the an ideal tech toy holiday gift for younger kids. Both the Parents and FamilyFun magazines awarded the product as "Best Toy of 2008". It was also nominated for the Educational Toy of the Year Award at the Toy Fair 2009.
