= Rock-a-Stack =

Toy

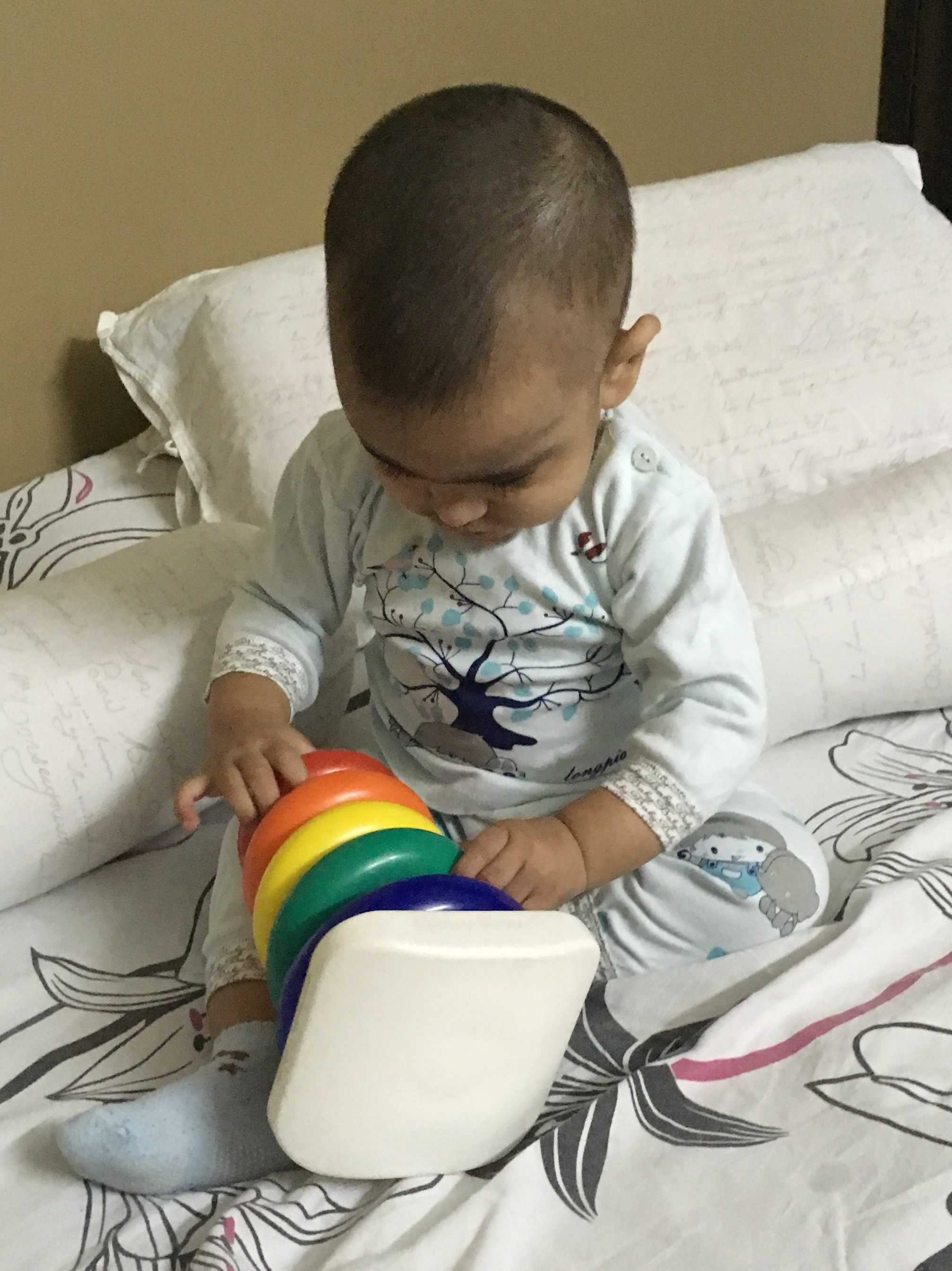
A child playing with a Rock-a-Stack

Rock-a-Stack is a toy by Fisher-Price with colorful rings that have to be placed in order of size onto a tapered pole mounted on a rocking base. When stacked correctly the hollow plastic rings follow ROYGBIV color progression. The Rock-a-Stack is designed to teach young children about colors and to help them develop their hand-eye coordination and shape perception. Since the introduction of Rock-a-Stacks in 1960, over 40 million have been sold. While Ernest Thornell was the Fisher-Price designer of this toy (from a phone conversation on 8-31-16 between Ernest Thornell and Eric Smith), the Rock-a-Stack is stylistically similar to the earlier Rocky Color Cone wooden stacking toy designed in 1938 by Jarvis Rockwell (brother of Norman Rockwell) for Holgate Toys.

== Production history ==
The Rock-a-Stack was produced at Fisher-Price's production facility in Holland, New York from 1962 until the factory's closing in 1990 when production was moved to other facilities in Murray, Kentucky and Mexico. Former employees of the Holland, New York factory each received a Rock-a-Stack as a parting gift on the final day of operations at the factory.

== Versions ==
Since the Rock-a-Stack's initial release in 1960 some key design changes have taken place:

- Until 1966 the Rock-a-Stack was made with a painted wooden base rather than the all-plastic construction of later versions.
- From 1960 to 1979 the toy was released with six rings, colored in the order of (largest to smallest) red, orange, yellow, green, blue and purple.
- From 1980 to 1989, the number of rings was reduced to five, the color order on the remaining rings was reversed and the color purple was no longer used.
- Beginning in 1990, the number of rings remained at five but the color order was again reversed to the original minus purple.
- As of 2020, Fisher-Price offers the toy in a oversized version, a 15-inch (38 cm) tall exact copy of the regular version. The giant toy also has six rings, including the top red/clear ring/rattle with three rolling balls inside.

== Cultural references ==
In 1985, the Fisher-Price Rock-a-Stack, Chatter Telephone, and Activity Center narrowly missed being included in NASA weightlessness toy experimentation due to the lack of time to perform safety tests prior to the March 1985 launch of the Space Shuttle Challenger.
