= LeapPad =

Line of children's tablet computers

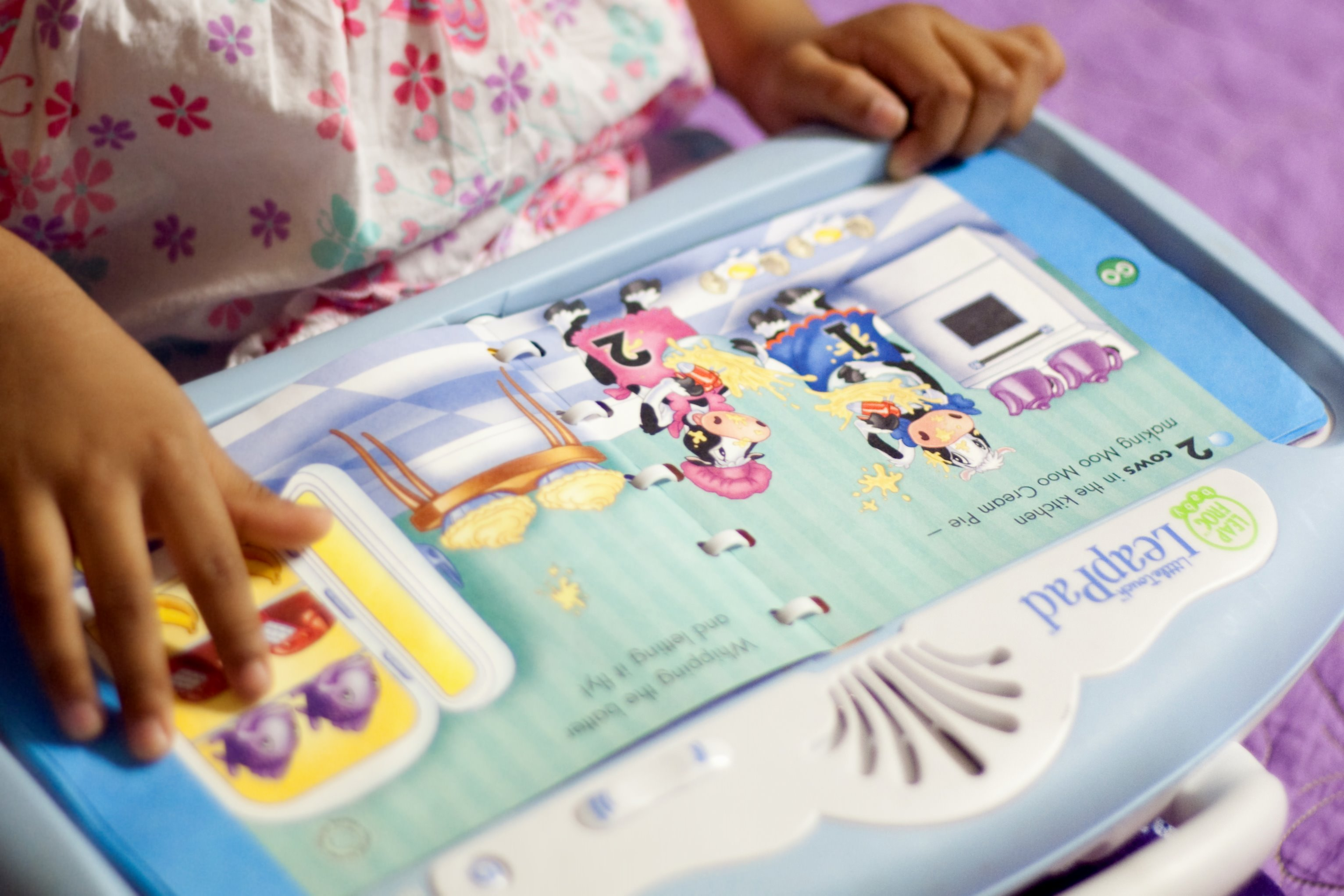
- A Little Touch LeapPad
- Developer: Explore Technologies
- Manufacturer: LeapFrog Enterprises
- Type: Series of tablet computers
- Released: 1999

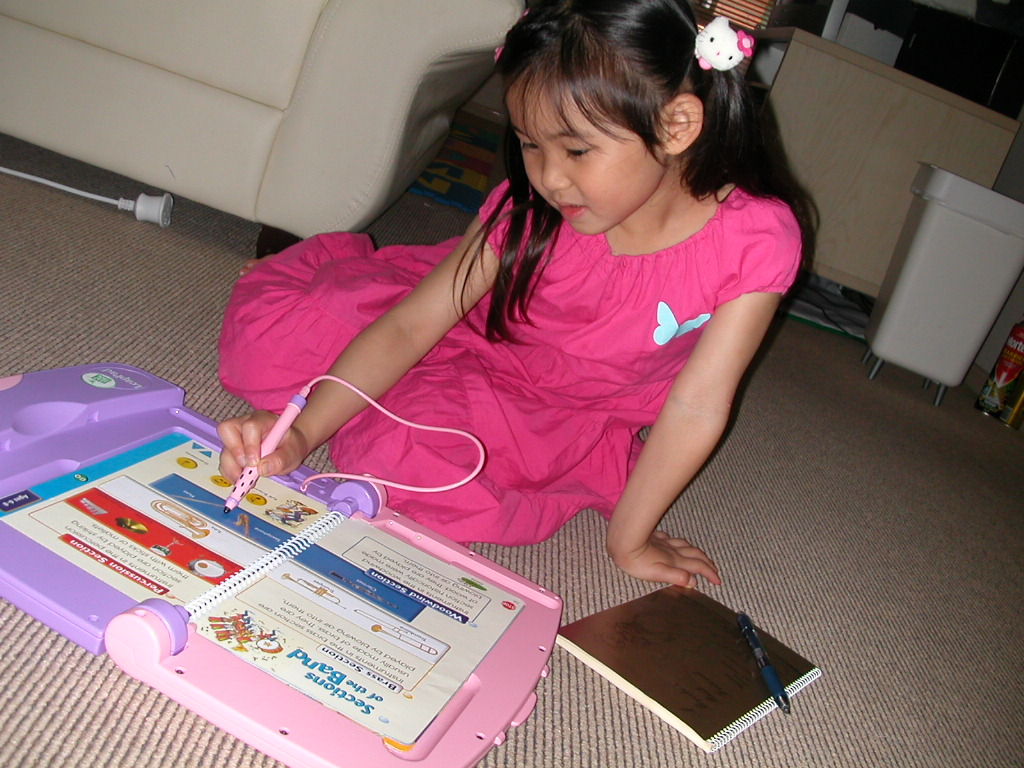
A girl with a LeapPad

The LeapPad (known as CoCoPad in Japan) is a range of tablet computers developed for children, specifically of the ages 3-9. Various models of the LeapPad have been developed by LeapFrog Enterprises since 1999.

== Development history ==
The device, resembling a talking book, took 3 years to develop and was introduced to the market in 1999. In 2001 (sales $160 million) and 2002 it was the best-selling toy in speciality stores. Sales in 2003 reached $680 million and were only eclipsed by sales of the book and cartridge add-ons. LeapStart is in red, Leap 1 is in orange, Leap 2 is in blue, and Leap 3 is in green.

LeapPad was invented by Jim Marggraff and developed by a team from Explore Technologies, Inc., which was founded by Marggraff and was acquired by LeapFrog in July 1998. It uses the same patented "NearTouch" technology developed for the Explore Technologies Odyssey Atlasphere. Investigation and development was started in December 1997.

Throughout the years, the LeapPad began getting more advanced and more similar to that of an iPad. The LeapPad Explorer sub-series of tablet-computers were the first LeapPads to introduce a touch capacitive display to the lineup.

== Models ==
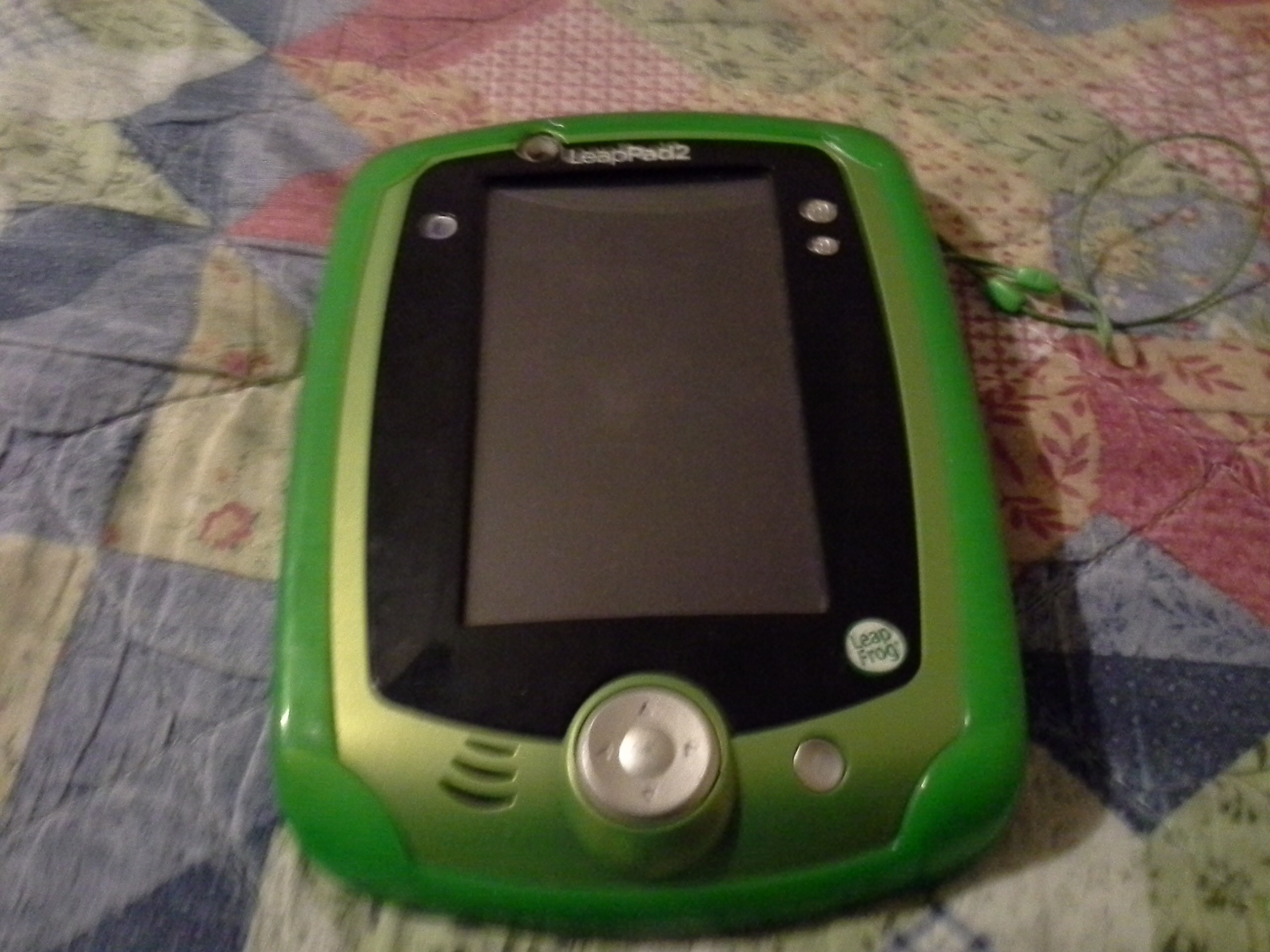
A LeapPad 2 Explorer

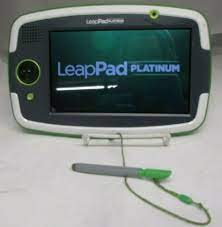
A LeapPad Platinum

Various models of the LeapPad were developed between its launch in 1999 and 2020:

- LeapPad (original model)
- LeapPad Plus Writing
- Read and Write LeapPad
- LeapPad Plus Microphone (aka Read Aloud LeapPad)
- LeapPad Pro
- Quantum LeapPad (aka Quantum Pad)
- LeapPad Plus Writing and Microphone
- Learn & Go LeapPad
- Cocopad (Japan exclusive)

=== LeapPad Explorer line ===
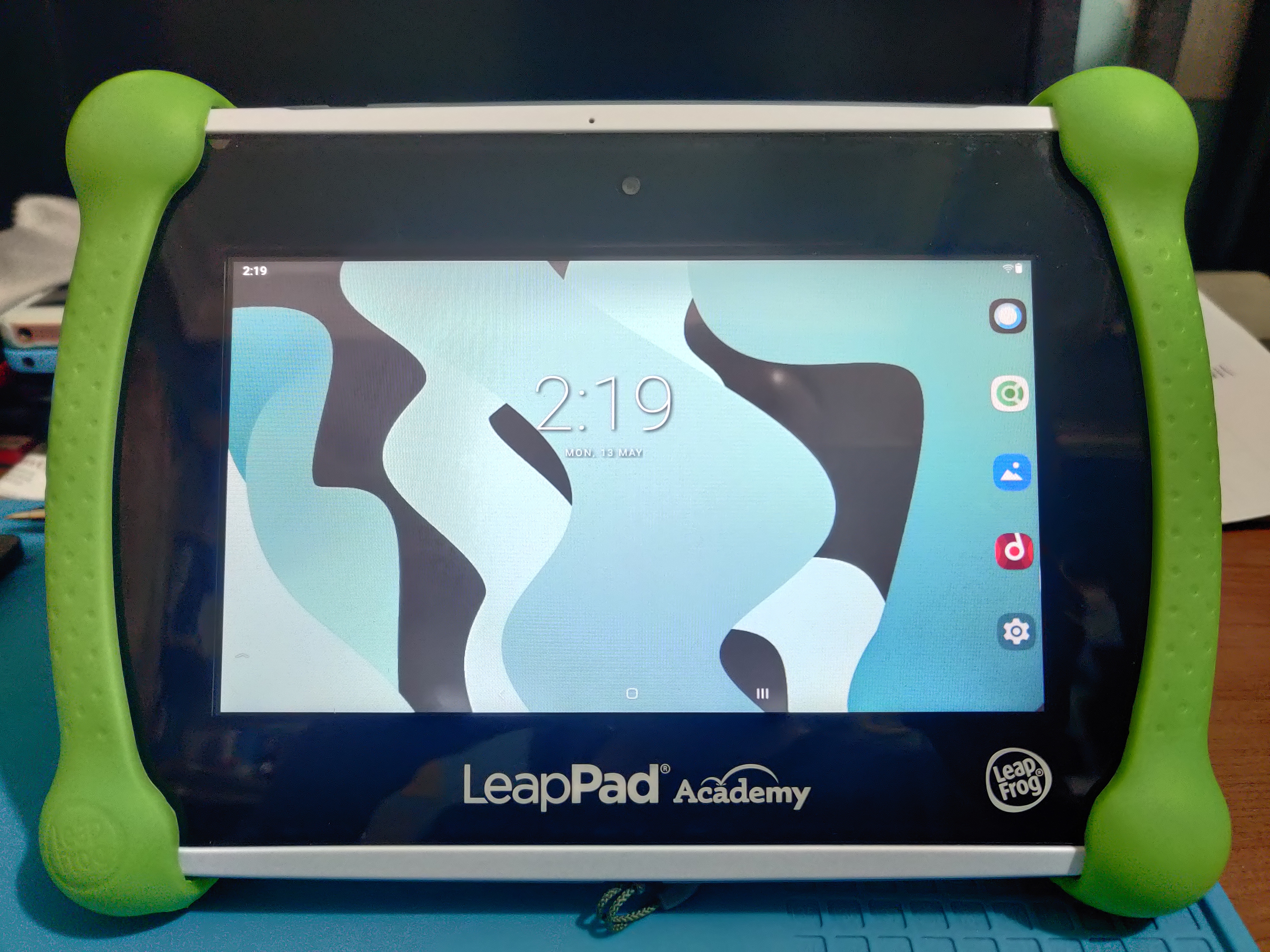
LeapPad Academy

- LeapPad Explorer (released in the summer of 2011): Similar to Apple's iPad, but unlike the iPad, users can only download proprietary LeapFrog apps and runs on its own operating system. The device has the capability to capture movies and take pictures. LeapFrog won the Platinum Award for LeapPad™ from the Oppenheim Toy Portfolio in September 2011.
- LeapPad 2 Explorer (released in the summer of 2012)
- LeapPad Ultra (released in the summer of 2013)
- LeapPad 3 (released in the summer of 2014): A handheld educational tablet-computer considered by many to be the spiritual successor to the LeapPad2, although said device is part of the LeapPad Explorer line of educational tablets. It comes in 2 distinct colors - Green and Pink. The device has dimensions of 7.5 × 5.2 × 1 inches, and weighs 0.85 Ibs (385 grams). It has a screen size of 5 inches and has a resolution of 480 × 272 pixels, equating for 231 ppi (Pixels per inch). The device has a Lithium-Polymer battery, and can have up to around 6 hours of battery life. It has an approximate charging time of 4 hours while being charged with the included AC adapter. The device includes 2 cameras - The front and the back cameras - each being 2mp. Users may take these photos and edit them with effects inside the dedicated included application "Photo Fun Ultra". The device can also shoot videos of up to 480p in resolution, which aligns with the screen resolution. The device comes with a 1GHz quad-core processor. It also comes with a dedicated stylus with a mesh tip.
- LeapPad Platinum (released in the summer of 2015)
- LeapPad Ultimate (released in February 2017)
- LeapPad Academy (released in 2019 as a variant of the LeapFrog Epic; a hardware revision running on a Rockchip RK3326 was quietly released in 2021)

=== Spin-offs incompatible with the mainstream series ===
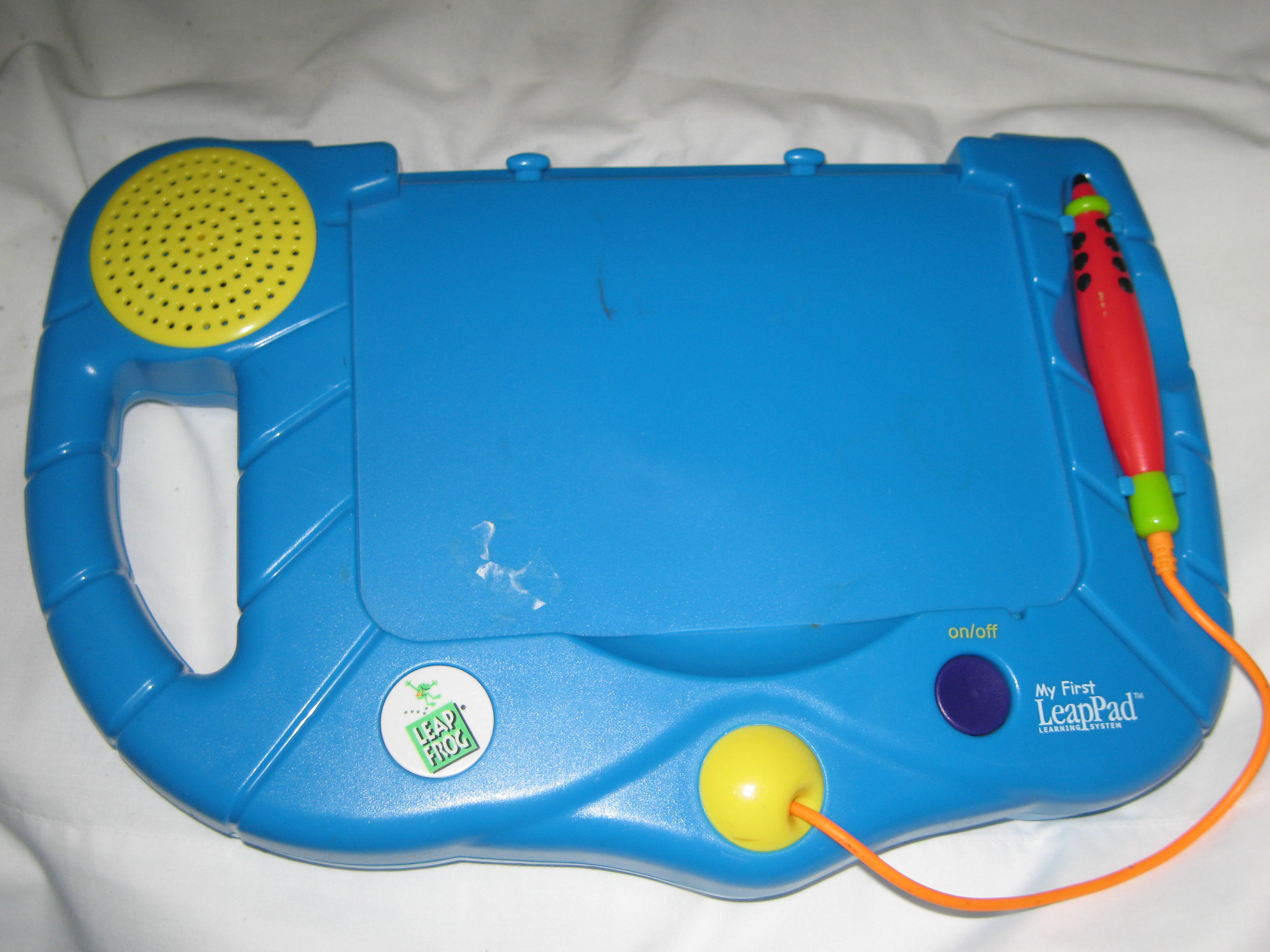
A My First LeapPad

The LeapPad's popularity helped spawn other LeapPad branded devices that are incompatible with the mainstream LeapPad series of players. These devices were meant for younger audiences who are not ready for the mainstream LeapPad's titles.

- My First LeapPad - Targeted for preschoolers to kindergarten children, the design of the LeapPad is different from a regular LeapPad in that the books are flipped upwards. The unit was later redesigned to be shaped like a school bus. A British-voiced version was also available in the UK.
- LittleTouch LeapPad - Targeted for babies to toddlers, the unit operated significantly different from a regular LeapPad in that it did not require a stylus to operate. The unit also featured a soft pad underneath to allow for the device to sit comfortably on the parents' or toddler's lap.

== Technology ==
The LeapPad is a computer with an electrographic sensor. The sensor works as a capacitor and measures the amount of current flowing through corner electrodes into a plate beneath the table top, and uses that information to triangulate the location of the stylus on the table top. The LeapPad is covered by U.S. patents 5686705 and 5877458.

== Apps ==
These apps are typically available on the newer LeapPads, such as the LeapPad Explorer series:

- Notepad
- Clock
- Calendar
- Voice Memo
- Photo Fun Ultra
- Music Player
- Pet Pad Party
- Pet Chat

== Competition and comparisons ==
The popularity of the LeapPad spawned a few competitions, most notably with Mattel under their Fisher-Price brand who launched the PowerTouch Learning System in 2003, and later in the following year with the PowerTouch Baby. The PowerTouch Learning System was far more advanced than the LeapPad in many ways, requiring no stylus to operate as it uses a touch-sensitive area, and even the ability to detect page changes automatically via a set of infrared sensors on the top of the device (which also imposed a limitation on how many pages a book for the system can offer). Despite the improvements and backing from popular brands like Nelvana and Scholastic, the PowerTouch did not catch on with the public as widely as the LeapPad did although it does have its share of followers.

The LeapPad also faced competition from publisher Publications International, Ltd. whose specialty included electronic children books with sound modules. The ActivePoint and Magic Wand titles operated on a similar principle to the LeapPad. However, the system faced limitations in that the book itself is bound to the reader and stylus and thus cannot be interchanged. Publications International later introduced the Story Reader and My First Story Reader system, which is more limited in function in that it will only read the story as the user turns the page, and features less interactive features: The Story Reader completely lacks any interactive functions, while the My First Story Reader only has simple quizzes answered through the use of three buttons at the bottom of the device. Due to the lower cost of the system, Publications International's offering remained competitive with the LeapPad. The tablet range of the LeapPad also competed with VTech's InnoTab line of interactive tablet computers.

In South Korea, children's education company ToyTron released the FutureBook series in 2013. The system is functionally identical to the first-generation LeapPad, requiring a stylus to operate and books are still being released for the brand as of 2023.

== Awards ==
LeapPad won the first-ever People's Choice Toy of the Year (T.O.T.Y.) award, as well as the Educational T.O.T.Y. award in 2000, sponsored by the Toy Industry Association. LeapPad2 would win both awards in 2013.

In September 2011, LeapFrog won the Platinum Award for LeapPad(TM) from the Oppenheim Toy Portfolio.

In 2013, LeapPad won the Dr. Toy “100 Best of 2013” award, as well as the “10 Best Technology 2013” award for the LeapPad Ultra.
