= PowerTouch Learning System =

Educational electronic toy by Fisher-Price

- PowerTouch teaching phonics
- Invented by: Fisher-Price
- Company: Fisher-Price (Mattel)
- Country: United States
- Availability: 2003–2006
- Slogan: "Put the power of reading at your child's fingertips"

PowerTouch Learning System is an electronic toy released by Fisher-Price in 2003, designed for children aged 3 to 8 years. It combined physical reading with electronic multimedia, using storybooks and workbooks with an attachable cartridge. Two starter books were bundled with the product, which did not require a cartridge. It had some similarities to LeapFrog Enterprises' LeapPad.

== Product ==
=== Description ===
The PowerTouch took the form of a workbook-shaped laptop-styled case with a yellow and purple casing and a grey carrying handle. When fully opened, the interior had the letters of the alphabet uppercase and lowercase spread across both sides with the vowels highlighted, a speak on the right side, and five buttons lined at the top edge, which activated modes for Alphabet, Words, Letters, Surprise, and Music. The device was powered by four AA batteries. The dedicated Electronic Console Books were fitted by the spine into the holder and the pages could be turned, just like a physical book, with a clip-on cartridge placed on the binding. Once hooked up, parts of the book pages could be touched with one finger like buttons to trigger a vocal sound for a word, spelling, counting, or a music tune. Unlike the LeapPad, the PowerTouch did not make use of a stylus or a continue button to progress.

=== Technology ===
The cartridges made use of microchip technology with around 60 activities incorporated in each one. The touch sensitivity for the pages of the electronic console books was done using Capacitive sensing, not unlike a notebook touch pad, but was able to distinguish the tap and touch of a finger to that of a larger area. The optical reader, which used lights and mirrors, enabled the PowerTouch to automatically distinguish the exact pages that were opened.

=== Educational Goals ===
Initially the way PowerTouch worked, children would respond and react to the words, letters, and number read out aloud, as well as the flashing lights corresponding to them. This enabled them to sound out words to grasp the concept of reading, identifying letters, and counting objects, whereas static physical books required guidance from a learned reader. The quizzes in the books tested the user to measure how much they learned. The PowerTouch could be comfortably played with on a child's lap or on floor. The touching of words and pictures helped the user to follow what they were reading via the "fingerpoint reading" approach.

=== Marketing ===
The PowerTouch device originally retailed at $50 on release. Books for the device were sold at $10 each. A variant of the case with a pink and purple color scheme was released later to cater to girls. Hoping to compete against Leapfrog's LittleTouch LeapPad and cater to babies, Fisher-Price president Neil Friedman put forward the idea and development of the PowerTouch Baby. By 2005, over 2.8 million PowerTouch units were sold.

=== Electronic Console Books ===
Original:

- Learn to Write (1)
- Math (1)
- Phonics (1)
- School Skills (2)
- Science (1)

Franchises:

- Angelina Ballerina (1)
- Arthur (2)
- The Berenstain Bears (1)
- Blue's Clues (1)
- Caillou (1)
- Clifford (2)
- Clifford's Puppy Days (1)
- Dragon Tales (2)
- Dora the Explorer (3)
- The Fairly OddParents (1)
- Franklin (1)
- I Spy (1)
- Jimmy Neutron (1)
- Looney Tunes (1)
- Maggie and the Ferocious Beast (1)
- Rescue Heroes (1)
- Sesame Street (3)
- SpongeBob SquarePants (2)

== Reception ==
A research survey from Born to Play indicated that educational toys like the PowerTouch were found by a majority of parents to help advance children's learning capabilities, and more than half considered talking books to be an important part of their children's' intellectual development. Educational researcher and specialist Warren Buckleitner regarded the PowerTouch as an educational gadget with the power of a computer, but the cosmetics of a book, allowing them to learn the essentials early. Despite it's uniqueness and notability, the PowerTouch didn't make into the 2006 North American International Toy Fair.

=== Lawsuit ===
By October 2003, LeapFrog Enterprises filed a civil lawsuit against Fisher-Price for a breach on the LeapPad patent over the design and technology, with the plaintiff claiming damages of $90 million, later reduced to $56 million. Mattel argued that its product in question did not breach the patent due to differing in technology and that LeapFrog's patent did not outline a new invention. Three years later, federal court dismissed the lawsuit, finding it lacked patent infringement.
