= Fisher-Price =

American toy company

Fisher-Price, Inc.
- Logo used since 2019
- Type: Brand
- Traded as: NYSE: FP (1991-1993)
- Industry: Toys
- Founded: June 19, 1930; 96 years ago
- Founders: Herman Fisher; Irving Price; Margaret Evans Price; Helen Schelle; Rebecca D. Fisher
- Headquarters: East Aurora, New York, U.S.
- Products: Baby toys; dolls
- Brands: Imaginext; Laugh & Learn; Little People
- Revenue: ▼US$1.07 billion (2020)
- Parent: Quaker Oats Company (1969–1991); Mattel (1993–present)
- Website: fisher-price.com

Fisher-Price, Inc. is an American toy brand that produces educational toys for infants, toddlers and preschoolers, headquartered in East Aurora, New York. It was founded in 1930 during the Great Depression by Herman Fisher, Irving Price, Helen Schelle and Margaret Evans Price.

Fisher-Price has been a wholly owned subsidiary of Mattel since 1993. Notable toys from the brand include the Little People toy line, Power Wheels, View-Master, Rescue Heroes, the Chatter Telephone, and the Rock-a-Stack. The company also manufactures a number of products and toys designed for infants.

== History ==
Fisher-Price was founded in 1930 during the Great Depression by Herman Fisher, Irving Price, Price's illustrator-artist wife Margaret Evans Price and Helen Schelle. Fisher worked previously in manufacturing, selling and advertising games for a company in Churchville, New York. Price had retired from a major variety chain store and Helen Schelle previously operated Penny Walker Toy Shop in Binghamton, New York. Fisher-Price's fundamental toy-making principles centered on intrinsic play value, ingenuity, strong construction, good value for the money and action. Early toys were made of heavy steel parts and ponderosa pine, which resisted splintering and held up well to heavy use. The details and charm were added with colorful lithographic labels. Mrs. Price was the first Art Director and designed push-pull toys for the opening line, based on characters from her children's books.

The mayor of East Aurora, New York supported Fisher by raising $100,000 in capital. In 1931, three of the four founders took 16 of their wooden toys to the American International Toy Fair in New York City and they quickly became a success. The first Fisher-Price toy ever sold was "Dr. Doodle" in 1931. In the early 1950s, Fisher-Price identified plastic as a material that could help the company incorporate longer-lasting decorations and brighter colors into its toys, introducing "Buzzy Bee" as the company's first. By the end of the 1950s, Fisher-Price manufactured 39 toys incorporating plastics.

During the 1960s, the Play Family (later known as Little People) product line was introduced and soon overtook the popularity of earlier toys. The 'Family House' was one of the more popular Little People playsets. Herman Fisher retired at the age of 71 in 1969 and The Quaker Oats Company bought Fisher-Price the same year.

In April 1990, Quaker Oats announced that they would spin off Fisher-Price as a publicly traded company, of which their shareholders would control the company. This was following struggling sales and competition from rival toy companies. The deal was completed at the end of June 1991, with the company trading on the New York Stock Exchange.

On August 20, 1993, Mattel announced that they had agreed to acquire Fisher-Price for $1 billion to create a single company. Fisher-Price's company assets would be folded into Mattel although they would keep their New York-based offices. The deal closed at the end of November, and Fisher-Price became a fully owned subsidiary. A new management group set the company's focus on basic infant and preschool products and began expansion into international markets. By 1997, Mattel decided to market all of its preschool products under the Fisher-Price name.

In 2004, Royal Caribbean Cruise lines launched Fisher-Price Cabanas, play laboratories for children on each of their cruise ships.

=== Recalls ===
On August 2, 2007, Fisher-Price recalled close to a million toys, including the Dora the Explorer and Sesame Street toys, because of possible hazards due to the toys being coated in lead-based paint.

=== Rock 'n Play ===
Fisher-Price recalled all 4.7 million of their Rock 'n Play sleepers on April 12, 2019, days after the company recalled 250,000 infant soothers. The product, introduced in 2009, holds the sleeping baby in an inclined position. More than 30 infants have died while sleeping in a Rock 'n Play. The Consumer Product Safety Commission said these deaths occurred "after the infants rolled over while unrestrained or under other circumstances".

Years before the introduction of the Rock 'n Play sleeper in the mid-1990s, the American Academy of Pediatrics' Back to Sleep campaign recommended that "babies should not sleep for long periods in inclined devices". In babies under one year old, dying during sleep (also known as SIDS, or "Sudden Infant Death Syndrome") is the leading cause of accidental death. The recommendation that babies sleep flat on their backs, in an empty crib, has cut this death rate in half.

The Rock 'n Play was designed 15 years after these sleep recommendations were published and, according to an article from The Washington Post, violated them. Fisher-Price sold the Rock 'n Play without first getting medical advice from more than one pediatric specialist and without doing any real-world safety tests. They continued to sell it for years after the first deaths were reported.

In January 2023, Mattel re-announced the recall after additional infant deaths were reported.

== Products ==
Fisher-Price has created approximately 5,000 different toys since the early 1930s. One of Fisher-Price's best-known lines is Little People toys, which includes people and animal figures, along with various play sets such as a house, farm, school, garage and vehicles. The figures, which originally were wooden peg-style characters, are now molded of plastic and have detailed features.

In addition to Little People, some of the toys and toy brands that have remained popular for many years include Power Wheels, View-Master, Rescue Heroes, the Chatter Telephone and the Rock-a-Stack. Other brands marketed under the Fisher-Price name over the years include Disney, Sesame Street, Dora the Explorer and See 'n Say.

Fisher-Price also designs and sells infant care products and has begun developing electronic toys for preschoolers.

In 2009, Mattel via Fisher-Price was appointed by HIT Entertainment become the global (excluding Japan) master toy licensee for Thomas & Friends, except for the Wooden Railway line. Through Mattel's 2012 acquisition of HIT Entertainment, which subsequently became a division of Fisher-Price, Mattel now owns the property outright. With this, toys based on Mike the Knight and Bob the Builder have been subsequently released.

=== Current ===
- Imaginext (2002–present)
- Laugh & Learn (2004–present)
- Little People (update of the Play Family line) (1959–present)
- Power Wheels (1985–present)
- Rainforest Jumperoo
- Smart Toy
- Think & Learn
- Thomas & Friends (2010-present)
- Barney's World (2025-present)

==== Baby-oriented ====
- Bassinets
- Crib soother & Mobiles
- Entertainers & Activity centers
- High chairs & Booster seats
- Domes
- Floor seats
- Tubs & Potties
- Carriers

=== Historic ===
==== Woodsey ====
During 1979–1983, Fisher-Price issued the Woodsey line of toys, whose characters were forest animals. It was accompanied by the Woodsey Log Library, a companion book series written by Marci Ridlon and illustrated by Cyndy Szekeres. Installments in the series included Grandma & Grandpa's Grand Opening, Uncle Filbert Saves the Day, Mayor Goodgrub's Very Important Day, and Lightning Strikes Twice. Later in the line's run, Michael Hague took over as illustrator with Bramble Beaver's Bright Idea and The Seasons with V.B. Bird.

==== US products ====
- 3rd & Bird related products (2008–2010)
- Adventure People
- Alphabet magnet board
- Amazing Animals
- Angelina Ballerina related products
- Arthur (Powertouch, Pixter and Easy Link only) (2002–2009) (Moved from Playskool))
- Baby Gymnastics
- Baby Looney Tunes related products (2002–2004)
- Barbie (Smart Cycle, Pixter, Little People, vehicle toys) (2004–2023)
- Barney related products (December 8, 2001–2005, and 2018 (Moved from Playskool))
- The Berenstain Bears related products (1985–1992)
- Between the Lions related products (2000–2002)
- Bob the Builder (Original) (Easy Link and Smart Cycle only)
- Bob the Builder (2015 reboot) related products (2016–2022)
- Brilliant Basics
- Chatter Telephone
- Clifford the Big Red Dog (Powertouch, Computer Cool School, Easy Link, Pixter and View Master only) (2002–2009)
- Construx building toys
- Corn Popper
- The Croods related products (2013–2014)
- Computer Cool School (2008-2011)
- Cyberchase (Pixter only) (2002–2006)
- Dance Baby Dance!
- DC League of Super-Pets related products (2022–2023)
- DC Super Friends (Smart Cycle, Trio, Hero World and Imaginext only) (2009–2021)
- Digital Arts And Crafts Studio (2007–2009)
- Discovery Channel
- Doodle Pro (changed name from Magna Doodle)
- Dragon Tales related products (2000–2004) (Moved from Playskool))
- Easy Link Internet Launch Pad (2007–2009)
- ESPN related products (2004–2009)
- Flip Track (1992–2002) (replaced in 2002 by GeoTrax, still compatible with GeoTrax)
- FP3 player
- Franklin (Powertouch and View Master Only)
- Fun 2 Learn
- Fusion Crew
- GeoTrax (2002–2011)
- Guess with Jess related products (2009–2010)
- Hero World (2010–2013)
- Hot Wheels (Trio, Smart Cycle and Pixter only) (2004–2014)
- I Can Play Guitar
- I Can Play Piano
- InteracTV (2004–2007)
- It's a Big Big World related products (2007)
- iXL Learning System (2010–2012)
- Jolly Jumping Jack crib toy
- Jurassic World (Imaginext only) (2015–2022)
- Kid Tough Electronics
- Knows Your Name Dolls (Sesame Street, Dora the Explorer, Winnie the Pooh, and SpongeBob SquarePants)
- Krypto the Superdog related products (2004–2007)
- Kung Fu Panda 2 related products (2011–2012)
- Learn Through Music (2002–2005)
- Learn Through Music Plus (2005–2007)
- Linkimals (2019-2024)
- Link Squad (2024-2025)
- Little Mommy (Baby dolls and their various accessories)
- Loving Family
- Baby Smartronics
- Little Superstar
- Looney Tunes (Powertouch only)
- Madagascar 3: Europe's Most Wanted related products (2012–2013)
- Maggie and the Ferocious Beast (Powertouch and View Master only)
- Minions: The Rise of Gru (Imaginext only) (2020–2022)
- Miracles and Milestones
- Monster Jam (Pixter only) (2002–2006)
- Movie Viewer
- The Mr. Men Show related products (2008-2009)
- My Friend Dolls (Mikey, Becky, etc.)
- Ocean Wonders
- Oreo Matchin Middles Game
- Peek-a-Blocks
- Pixter (2000–2007)
- Play Family
- Pocket Rockers
- Pop-onz
- Power Rangers (Imaginext only) (2015–2018)
- PowerTouch Learning System (2003-2006)
- Puffalumps
- Purr-tenders (1987–88)
- The Puzzle Place related products (2000)
- PXL-2000 camcorder
- Read With Me DVD
- Roll-a-Rounds
- Roly Poly
- Scooby-Doo (Imaginext, iXL, Smart Cycle, Computer Cool School and Pixter only) (2004–2020)
- SeaWorld
- Sesame Street related products (July 4 2000–2011, (all moved to Hasbro, and 1993–1997 (moved from Tyco))
- Shake 'n Go! (2005–2017)
- Shrek Forever After (Smart Cycle and iXL only) (2010–2011)
- Smart Cycle (2007–2017)
- Smart Street (1994–??)
- Snap 'n Style Friends & Fashions
- SparkArt Creativity System
- Spelling Starter (1987-1990)
- Star Station Entertainment System (2004–2007)
- StoryBots related products (2018–2020)
- Super Why! (View Master and Computer Cool School only) (2009–2010)
- Talk-to-Me books with record "discs" built into the pages
- Teen Titans (Pixter only) (2004–2006)
- Teen Titans Go! (Imaginext only) (2017–2020)
- Toddlerz
- Toots the Train
- Trio (2009–2014)
- Trolls Band Together (Imaginext only) (2023–2024)
- VeggieTales related products (August 23, 2000–2001, moved to Blue Box Toys)
- View-Master (1939–2020)
- View Master Super Sounds (2004–2006)
- The Wiggles (Easy Link and View Master only) (2002–2009)
- Winx Club (Pixter only) (2004–2006)
- Yu-Gi-Oh! (Pixter only) (2004–2006)

===== Disney =====
- Bambi (Disney Baby only) (2013-2015)
- Bear in the Big Blue House related products (1998–2001)
- Cars related products (Shake N Go, Spiral Speedway, and Geotrax only) (2006–2010)
- Cars 2 related products (2011–2012)
- Disney Princess related products (2002–2006)
- Dumbo (Disney Baby only) (2013-2015)
- Finding Nemo (Disney Baby only) (2013–2015)
- Handy Manny related products (November 28, 2008–2013)
- Higglytown Heroes related products (2007)
- Jake and the Never Land Pirates related products (June 10, 2012–2018)
- JoJo's Circus (View Master and Easy Link Only) (2006-2007)
- Jungle Junction related products (2011–2012)
- The Koala Brothers related products (2004–2009)
- Lightyear (Imaginext only) (2022–2023)
- The Lion King (Disney Baby only) (2013-2015)
- Little Einsteins related products (2007–2010)
- Mickey Mouse related products (1999–2001)
- Mickey and the Roadster Racers related products (2017–2020)
- Mickey Mouse Clubhouse related products (November 28, 2008–2017)
- Monsters University (Imaginext only) (2013–2015)
- The Muppets related products (1975–2004, including the rare Wild Animal plush)
- My Friends Tigger & Pooh related products (November 28, 2008–2010)
- The Octonauts related products (May 8, 2013–2017)
- Planes related products (2013–2015)
- Rolie Polie Olie related products (1999–2004)
- Stanley (View Master only) (2006)
- Toy Story 3 related products (2010–2011)
- Toy Story 4 related products (2019–2020)
- Winnie the Pooh related products (1999–2007, 2011–2017, 2020–2022)

===== Nickelodeon =====
- The Adventures of Jimmy Neutron, Boy Genius (Powertouch, InteracTV, I Can Play Piano, and Pixter only) (2004–2007)
- Alvinnn!!! and the Chipmunks related products (2017–2018)
- The Fairly OddParents (Powertouch, InteracTV, I Can Play Piano and Pixter only) (2004–2007)
- The Penguins of Madagascar (Smart Cycle and iXL only) (2010–2012)
- Rocket Power (Pixter only) (2004)
- SpongeBob SquarePants related products (2005–2007)
- The SpongeBob Movie: Sponge on the Run (Imaginext only) (2020–2022)
- The SpongeBob Movie: Sponge Out of Water (Imaginext only) (2015–2016)
- Teenage Mutant Ninja Turtles (Vehicle toys only) (2012–2017)

===== Nick Jr. =====
- The Backyardigans related products (2006–2011)
- Blaze and the Monster Machines related products (May 22, 2015 – November 27, 2021)
- Blue's Clues related products (July 4, 2000-2004, August 2006) (moved from Tyco)
- Blue's Room related products (September 18, 2004 - 2005)
- Bubble Guppies related products (April 2, 2013 – May 15, 2016)
- Butterbean's Cafe related products (May 1, 2019 - November 1, 2020)
- Dora and Friends related products (March 2015–2017)
- Dora the Explorer related products (2002–2017) (moved to Spin Master)
- Favorites of Nick Jr. (2015–2017)
- Go Diego Go related products (September 6, 2006 – 2011)
- Julius Jr. related products (June 22, 2014 – 2017)
- LazyTown related products (2005–2007)
- Little Bill related products (2001–2004)
- Mike the Knight related products (2013–2017)
- Miss Spider's Sunny Patch Friends related products (2005)
- Ni Hao, Kai-Lan related products (May 18, 2009 – August 8, 2012)
- Nickelodeon Knows Your Name (2009)
- Peppa Pig related products (August 15, 2012 - 2017, all moved to Hasbro)
- Rainbow Rangers related products (July 3, 2019 - August 4, 2020)
- Santiago of the Seas related products (June 4, 2022 - May 24, 2023)
- Shimmer and Shine related products (July 2, 2016 – 2022)
- Sunny Day related products (2018–2020)
- Team Umizoomi related products (2012–2015)
- Wonder Pets related products (March 2008 – 2010)
- Wow! Wow! Wubbzy! related products (2008–2010)

==== International products ====
- Bing related products
- Cleo & Cuquin related products
- Fimbles related products
- Go Jetters related products
- Lunar Jim related products
- Waybuloo related products (2009)

=== Video games ===
Starting in the 1980s, seven games which carried the Fisher-Price name were developed by GameTek for the PC and the Commodore 64. In 1990, three of these titles were ported to the Nintendo Entertainment System:

- Fun Flyer (1984) (never shipped initially, but eventually released in 1990)
- Firehouse Rescue (1992)
- Little People Bowling Alley (1989)
- School Bus Driver (1989)
- My Grand Piano (1989)
- Perfect Fit (1988)
- I Can Remember (1989)

Titles developed by Davidson & Associates include:

- Fisher Price ABC's
- Fisher Price 123's
- Fisher Price Sing Alongs: Barnyard Rhythm and Moos
- Fisher Price Dream Dollhouse
- Fisher Price Ready for School
- Great Adventures Castle
- Great Adventures Pirate Ship
- Great Adventures Wild Western Town
- Puddle Books Series
- Learning in Toyland
- Ready for School Toddler
- Ready for School Preschool
- Ready for School Kindergarten
- Ready for School Reading
- Ready for School 1st Grade

Other titles published by Fisher-Price include:

- Great Adventures Pirate Ship (1998)
- Time to Play Pet Shop (1999)
- Big Action Construction (2001)
- Big Action Garage (2001)

=== Other ===
Other Fisher-Price products include Activegear for families on the go, books, software, car travel accessories, footwear, music, eyeglasses and videos.

== See also ==
- List of game manufacturers
- Bandai
- Hasbro
- LEGO
- Mattel
- Spin Master
- MGA Entertainment
- TOMY
- Playskool
- Little Tikes
