= The Wild Puffalumps =

1987 animated cartoon film by Alan Bunce

- Directed by: Alan Bunce
- Written by: Alan Bunce
- Produced by: Michael Hirsh; Lenora Hume; Patrick Loubert; Ronnie Pollack; Clive A. Smith; Heather Walker
- Starring: Tara Strong; Marlow Vella; Jennifer Gula; Mairon Bennett; Noam Zylberman; Victor Erdos; Adam Simpson; Lisa Coristine; Tara Meyer
- Music by: Stephen Hudecki
- Production company: Nelvana
- Distributed by: Family Home Entertainment; Cineplex Odeon Films (Canada); MCA (Canada)
- Release date: 1988
- Running time: 22 minutes
- Country: Canada

The Wild Puffalumps is a 22-minute direct-to-video animated cartoon, based on the Puffalump toyline of the same name. It was produced by Nelvana and released on videocassette in the United States by Family Home Entertainment in 1988 and in Canada by Cineplex Odeon Corporation and MCA.

This cartoon was intended to act as an advertisement for the "Wild Puffalumps" toyline, which consisted of vividly colored Puffalumps wearing Aloha shirts and sunglasses whose lenses displayed the word "WILD" when seen at the proper angle. The glasses were large enough that the children who owned the toys could wear them, a fact which was pointed out in the television commercial for the toys.

In the cartoon, the characters all live on an island separate from the rest of the world, much like many other 1980s toy-based cartoon characters (Care Bears, My Little Pony, etc.). The two children who visit this place soon find themselves going on a journey, parts of which are like amusement park rides, and the word "wild" is repeatedly emphasized throughout the cartoon. All of this is intended to make the characters fit in with the current cartoon culture, as well as give the impression that the toys on which they are based are fun and exciting.

The VHS has been currently out of print since the end of the 1980s, and the cartoon was never released on DVD. The Wild Puffalumps toys were sold in 1987 and discontinued the same year.

== Voice cast ==
As listed in closing credits:

- Tara Strong as Holly (credited as Tara Charendoff)
- Marlow Vella as Kevin
- Jennifer Gula as Elephant
- Mairon Bennett as Toucan
- Noam Zylberman as Tiger
- Victor Erdos as Walrus
- Adam Simpson as Rhino
- Lisa Coristine as Monkey
- Tara Meyer as Panda
