= Purr-tenders =

Line of animal toys

- Type: Stuffed toys
- Invented by: Hallmark Properties
- Company: Fisher-Price
- Country: United States
- Availability: 1987; 38 years ago–1989; 36 years ago
- Slogan: "We're fun and furry. We're the Purr-tenders"

Purr-tenders is a toy franchise created by Hallmark Properties and Fisher-Price in 1987. The Purr-tenders are five colorful cats who wear carnival-like masks trying to pretend that they are a different animal. Hugging the toy triggered a purring noise, powered by AA batteries. By November 21, 1988, they also came as puppets called Sock-Ems (except for Chirp-purr).

== Purr-Tenders ==
=== Premise ===
The Purr-tenders originally came from the Pick-A-Dilly pet store, where people bought exotic pets. Nobody showed any interest in the cats, so they decided to don on animal masks and act like animals that corresponded with their new look, adopting the title Purr-Tender. Shortly afterwards they were adopted. While enjoying their new lives, they struggled to keep the fact that they were really cats secret from humans, exposed only by their purring sound.

=== Characters ===
- Hop-Purr - A purple cat who wears pink bunny ears and nose. She often leads the other Purr-Tenders in their adventures. Her owner is Amy Poole.
- Flop-purr - A black cat who wears a yellow beak and flippers. Often he is the acting leader of the group. His owner is Kevin Evans
- Romp-purr - A yellow cat who wears purple puppy ears and a blue nose. Mostly she's a tomboy and the brawn of the group.
- Scamp-purr - A white cat who wears purple mouse ears and nose. She is kind of timid, but tends to think up helpful ideas.
- Chirp-purr - A pink cat who wears a toucan beak and crest. What she lacks in flight, she makes up for in climbing and singing. Her owner is Anita Rose.
- Mr. Bungle - The owner of the Pick-A-Dilly pet store. He takes good care of the pets and is allergic to feathers.
- Ed-grr - Mr. Bungle's mean retriever dog who attempts to expose the Purr-Tenders, cage them and have them sent back to the pet shop they came from.

== Sales and Promotion ==
By April 1988, Hallmark had released a number of books starring the Purr-tenders. Later around Halloween, the Purr-tenders was an inspiration for dressing up and pretending in a safe manner. By December that same year, the Purr-Tenders were among the successful selling toys in Kansas. In Indiana, Burger King donated Purr-Tender toys to Riley Hospital, while selling several more to customers to raise extra funds for the hospital. A few days after that, Riley received a visit from a Scamp-Purr mascot bearing gifts, compliments of Burger King. In Ohio, the local Burger King and Elyria High School students promoted the sale of the stuffed toys. In addition a Purr-tender mascot came to Broad Street on December the 20th. Both promotional activities aided in raising funds and awareness for the "Chemical Abuse Reduced through Education" project. A few days before Christmas, Curly Neal handed out Purr-tender stuffed toys from Burger King to the Children's Hospital of Michigan. Around this time, sales of those toys, raised money for the adoption agency Spaulding for Children. Burger King continued to sell the Sock-Ems plushies after Christmas and by January 1989, the Virginia Beach Boulevard Burger King sponsored a coloring contest, which granted winners Purr-tender toys as prizes.

== Books ==
- The Story of the Purr-tenders (with audio cassette)
- Hop-purr Hops Into Trouble
- Purr-tenders Paint with Water
- Purr-tenders Sticker Fun
- Purr-tenders Activity Book
- Purr-tenders Big Color/Activity Book
- Purr-tenders Paint n' Marker Book
- Purr-tenders Ice Escapades
