= Chatter Telephone =

Telephone shaped pull toy for toddlers

- Modern version of the Chatter Telephone
- Type: Toy telephone
- Company: Fisher-Price
- Country: United States
- Availability: 1961; 65 years ago–present
- Materials: Wood, plastic
- Slogan: "Look who's talking now!"

The Chatter Telephone is a pull toy for toddlers 12 to 36 months of age. Introduced in 1961 by the Fisher-Price company as the "Talk Back Phone" for infants and children, which was updated to the name Chatter Telephone in 1962, is a roll along pull toy. It has a smiling face, and when the toy is pulled, it makes a chattering sound and the eyes move up and down. The toy has a rotary dial that rings a bell, and was conceived as a way to teach children how to dial a phone.

The original version was made of wood, with a polyethylene receiver and cord. In 2000, Fisher-Price changed the rotary dial for a push-button version with lights in an effort to modernize the toy, but consumers complained and the rotary version returned to the market the following year. The Chatter Telephone was designed by Ernest Thornell, whose daughter Tina would drag around a metal phone while playing. This gave him the idea of adding wheels, which with a bent axle permitted the movement of eyes, adding to the "whimsical" nature, that Herman Fisher desired of all Fisher-Price toys (from phone conversation with Ernie Thornell and recollections of Herm Fisher by John Smith).

From its introduction through the 1970s, the Chatter Telephone was Fisher-Price's best selling product. It has been cited as one of the company's offerings that helped save Fisher Price in the 1990s following a failed attempt to market toys for older children in the late 1980s, and enjoys continuing popularity. It is available both as an authentic reproduction and in a modern form.

== In popular culture ==
- In 1985, Fisher-Price offered to donate a Chatter Telephone, Rock A Stack, and Activity Center to NASA for Senator Jake Garn to play with while on the STS-51-D space shuttle mission. This offer was rejected as NASA felt there was insufficient time to test the toys for safety.
- In the 1999 movie, The Adventures of Elmo in Grouchland, Elmo owns a Chatter Telephone.
- The 2002 Venetian Snares album 2370894 features a melted Chatter Telephone on its cover art.
- In The Simpsons episode "Moe Baby Blues", Maggie Simpson is seen having a Chatter Telephone in her room.
- In 2003, the Chatter Telephone was listed as one of the 100 most memorable toys of the 20th century by the Toy Industry Association.
- In 2005, the Chatter Telephone was chosen as one of Dr. Toy's Best Classic Toys.
- A Chatter Telephone toy appears in the 2010 animated film Toy Story 3 as a supporting character, who has been at Sunnyside Daycare for many years, and helps Woody save his friends from Lotso, notably warning him about a cymbal-banging monkey who watches the daycare’s security cameras and alerts Lotso to toys attempting to escape. He is voiced by Teddy Newton and speaks with a film noir style, and a Brooklyn accent.
- The Chatter Telephone influenced an art car created by Howard Davis for his telecommunications company.
- A Chatter Telephone appears on the cover of American rock band Thee Oh Sees' 2011 album Castlemania.
- A Chatter Telephone appears in the 2017 animated film The Boss Baby. He also appears in the sequel The Boss Baby: Family Business.
- A Chatter Telephone prominently appears in the 2022 horror film Skinamarink.
