= I-Ready =

Online learning program created in 2011

i-Ready
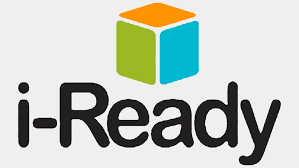
- Website type: Online educational platform, blended learning
- Available in: English
- Founded: 2011; 15 years ago
- Headquarters: North Billerica, Massachusetts, U.S.
- Founder: Frank Ferguson
- Services: Online education
- Revenue: $800,000,000
- Parent: Curriculum Associates
- Website: www.curriculumassociates.com
- Registration: Required
- Content license: Proprietary Software

i-Ready is an educational technology platform developed by Curriculum Associates. Founded in 2011, it provides online diagnostic assessments and screen-based instruction in both reading and mathematics to students in grades K–12.

== History ==
i-Ready began development in 2009 and was released publicly in 2011. It is owned by Curriculum Associates, an educational publisher that was founded in 1969 and originally produced printed educational materials such as workbooks. Their headquarters is located in North Billerica, Massachusetts.

As of 2026, i-Ready is used by almost 14 million students, including nearly a third of K–12 students in the United States.

In 2021, the New York City Department of Education began requiring online reading and mathematics assessments three times a year to measure pandemic-related learning loss. i-Ready was one of the platforms used for those assessments.

=== i-Ready Pro ===
In September 2025, Curriculum Associates released a version of i-Ready for students from 6th–12th grade, called i-Ready Pro. It was designed to provide age-appropriate lessons to students, without using the regular characters that may seem childish.

== Features ==
=== i-Ready Inform ===
i-Ready Inform (formerly i-Ready Diagnostic) is an adaptive testing system; tests becomes easier if a question is answered incorrectly and harder if a question is answered correctly. It aims to assess students' academic performance and determine appropriate lesson placement.

=== Personalized instruction ===
i-Ready includes digital lessons in reading and mathematics, which students are assigned based on their performance on the i-Ready Inform test. Lessons are presented by a set of cartoon characters to make them more engaging for younger students. A lawsuit filed in July of 2026 challenges the idea that i-Ready's lessons are personalized.

== Criticism ==
Many students, parents and teachers complain that i-Ready's content is repetitive, slow, and rigid, making students bored and frustrated and taking up valuable instructional time. Teachers cannot control what questions or instruction students receive, and i-Ready's algorithm may force students to answer the same questions repeatedly. i-Ready has also been criticized for concealing how it calculates scores and preventing educators from reviewing which questions a student answered correctly or incorrectly. Teachers say that this limits their ability to help struggling students.

Much of Curriculum Associates' research supporting i-Ready's effectiveness is conducted in-house using the system's own data, which some critics have called a form of "science-washing."

=== Awards ===
i-Ready's publisher, Curriculum Associates, maintains a page on its website listing various awards that i-Ready and its other programs have received. Critics note that these are all issued by trade associations, publications, and conference organizers within the ed-tech industry, who in some cases distribute a large number of awards for a high submission fee.

Curriculum Associates has faced backlash for its own "Extraordinary Educator" award program, which has been criticized for primarily existing to advertise i-Ready; one recipient of the award described it as "us[ing] teachers as pawns to sell a product." Only teachers and principals who use i-Ready are eligible for the award, and recipients' images and statements are used in marketing materials for the platform. Curriculum Associates similarly issues awards to schools whose students show improvement in i-Ready's "Stretch Growth" metric, which critics say has no scientific basis.

== Studies ==
In a fee-for-service study commissioned by i-Ready publisher Curriculum Associates, the Center for Research and Reform in Education (CRRE) at Johns Hopkins University reported that students mandated to complete both i-Ready Inform diagnostics and i-Ready Personalized Instruction scored a nominal 5-8 points higher on the Massachusetts Comprehensive Assessment System (MCAS) than did students compelled to complete only the i-Ready diagnostic. Additionally, a subset of higher performing students (those already passing 70+% of lessons), who also adhered to the publisher's usage guidelines of 90 minutes minimum of i-Ready math and ELA for 18 weeks (27 hours), scored 6-17 points higher than students who had consistently failed more than 30% of lessons.

This study was financed by Curriculum Associates and relied on scoring data calculated by the proprietary i-Ready system. From the executive summary:

In July 2021, The Center for Research and Reform in Education (CRRE) at Johns Hopkins University contracted with Curriculum Associates (CA) to conduct a quantitative efficacy study of the effects of i-Ready Personalized Instruction on student achievement in five Massachusetts school districts.

A 2020 study found that first-grade students who used i-Ready for reading instruction showed no significant difference in reading scores compared to students who did not.

On the other hand, a 2024 study by Georgia State University's Georgia Policy Lab, examining whether online learning tools could help with academic recovery efforts following the COVID-19 pandemic, showed that students who used i-Ready increased their scores on standardized tests more than those who did not.

== Lawsuits ==
=== M.C. v. Curriculum Associates ===
Filed December 22, 2025 in U.S. Federal Court, District of Massachusetts by plaintiffs Nicole Reisberg and Lila Byock. Attorneys from the Ed-Tech Law Center allege i-Ready publisher Curriculum Associates uses its flagship ed-tech platform to collect and monetize the private data of minors without proper parental consent. The lawsuit also claims that student information is used to build psychological profiles of students for predictions of future student behavior.

Curriculum Associates denied the allegations, saying that it only uses personal information for educational purposes and does not sell students' data.

=== CEP v. Curriculum Associates ===
Filed July 31, 2026 in Washington D.C. Superior Court, plaintiff Center for Educational Progress alleges that Curriculum Associates engages in false advertising to market i-Ready products. Its three core allegations are that 1) the i-Ready "diagnostic" is not a true diagnostic, 2) i-Ready "personalized learning" is not personalized, and 3) Curriculum Associates' claims that using i-Ready "with fidelity" results in "greater growth" is based on studies designed and scored by the publisher itself, and attempts to "shift the risk of their underperformance to children, families, and teachers."

== See also ==
- IXL Learning
