= Margaret Evans Price =

American artist & toy designer (1888–1973)

Margaret Evans Price (March 20, 1888 – November 20, 1973) was an American toy manufacturer, children's book illustrator, and artist. With her husband, Irving Price, Helen Schelle, and Herman Fisher, she co-founded Fisher-Price Toys in 1930. She became the first Art Director of Fisher-Price and designed push-pull toys for the opening line, based on characters from her children's books.

== Family ==
Margaret was a member of the wealthy Evans family of New York who, for a time, had an effective monopoly on the building material industry in the City. Margaret's brother, Heathcliff, expanded his father's business operations to include a book binding business which, at its peak, encompassed a complex of buildings on East 12th Street in Manhattan. Margaret's cousin was Republican politician and Chief Justice of the United States, Charles Evans Hughes.

After getting married, she lived with her family in East Aurora, New York. In 2014, her former residence is being considered for demolition or historical preservation.

== Career ==
Margaret Evans began her art career at an early age, and sold her first illustrated story to the Boston Journal in 1900. She attended high school in Charlestown, Boston, and went on to study at the Massachusetts Normal Art School. From there, she went on to study at the Boston Academy of Fine Arts under the tutelage of Joseph DeCamp and Vesper George. Before she married Irving Price, Evans worked as a freelance artist in New York City, publishing with Rand McNally, Harper & Brothers and Stecher Lithography [Rochester, NY] After the formation of Fisher-Price, Margaret went on to exhibit her work in many galleries nationally. She was also published in Nature Magazine, the Women's Home Companion, and Pictorial Review.
