= FP3 player =

Digital audio player manufactured by Fisher-Price

The Kid Tough FP3 Player was a portable media player designed by Fisher-Price as an educational learning device for preschool children. It had similar features and functionalities as adult portable media players, intending to promote digital literacy in young children.

Released in 2006, the Kid Tough FP3 Player was one of the first portable media players for young children. It included its own software and a USB cable for importing audio onto the device. The FP3 Player also included an online store for downloading music and stories. It was discontinued in 2007.

== Technical features and functions ==
The Kid Tough FP3 Player and its contents included a song and story player with a 1.5-inch” LCD screen, 128 MB of storage, one set of headphones, a breakaway neck strap, a CD-ROM with FP3 Player software, and a USB cable.

The device included six preloaded songs and two stories, and additional content could be downloaded from the Fisher-Price Online Content Store for ninety-nine cents each.

The device also required AAA alkaline batteries, a Phillips-head screwdriver for battery installation, and an SD card for additional song storage and content, all of which were not included.

The Kid Tough FP3 Player had system requirements included having access to a PC with Microsoft Windows XP or Windows 2000, 500 MHz Pentium III (Processor), 256–512 MB of memory, a hard drive with 150 MB of disk space for installation, 1024 x 768 video resolution, a USB port, Microsoft Internet Explorer 6.0 with SP1, and Macromedia Flash Plug-in.

=== Interface ===
The Kid Tough FP3 Player included a simple interface with large buttons, a durable body, volume-limiting controls, and a display screen that showed visual icons for the titles of each song or story.

=== User Experience and Consumer Feedback ===
Feedback from reviews criticized the Kid Tough FP3 Player for not being compatible with 64-bit or Mac computers. CNET also said that "the foam earpieces come off too easily," and that it was "pretty pricey for a 128 MB player."

=== Additional Features ===
Additional products could be purchased alongside the Kid Tough FP3 Player, such as Player Speakers and a player case.

== Cultural influence and legacy ==
=== Educational Significance ===
In listening to audio, such as audiobooks, children can "become readers who can understand the message, think critically about the content, use their imagination, and make connections." Children can be exposed to features "only found in the audiobook, including music, a skilled narrator’s use of voices and dialects, and supplemental materials ... [which] add to the enjoyment of the book," which may in turn help children with "developing their listening skills."

=== Gendered Packaging ===
The Kid Tough FP3 Player was offered in blue or pink. The packaging of the FP3 Player featured a gendered marketing approach towards its target audience by offering a blue version of the FP3 Player with a boy on the packaging and a pink version of the FP3 Player with a girl on the packaging. The device was not available for purchase in other colors, and the Kid Tough FP3 Player has been notable in discussions of gendered toy marketing for its impact on children’s perceptions of gender through its packaging design. For the early 2000s, the FP3 Player is an example in the evolution of educational toys that reflected both the gender norms of its time and the shift towards more inclusive designs in the following years of toys on the market.

== Competition and comparisons ==
In the years surrounding the release of the Kid Tough FP3 Player, other influential electronic, educational toys for children were released by competing toy companies such as LeapFrog Enterprises and Playskool. The Kid Tough FP3 Player followed the creation of similar products released during the same time period that combined audio, learning, and play for children, such as LeapFrog Enterprises’ Leapster. The FP3 Player and its promotion of technological engagement within children through engaging with toys is a noteworthy example of how traditional toy manufacturers adapted to the digital age of the early 2000s. This device also reflects the toy companies’ abilities to evolve their products to address the needs and developed interests of a new generation of toy consumers and their preferences.

The FP3 Player was introduced during a period of significant innovation in educational technology in children’s toys. This development marked a shift towards more interactive and personalized experiences for children to enhance their education through technology.
