= Puffalump =

Stuffed animals created by Fisher-Price

The Puffalumps were stuffed animals created by Fisher-Price in 1986. They were lightweight stuffed animals made of parachute material and filled with poly-fil stuffing. Over the years, Fisher-Price released several different lines within the Puffalump brand, including the Puffalump Pets, Baby Puffalumps, Wild Puffalumps, Barnyard Puffalumps, Puffalump Kids, Jungle Juniors, and Care for Me Puffalumps. Special Puffalumps were occasionally released to commemorate holidays such as Easter, Christmas, and Valentine's Day.

Several of the original Puffalumps were re-released in 2006, in time for the line's 20th anniversary. These Puffalumps were the larger original size as opposed to the smaller 8"-10" size that was prevalent throughout the late 1980s and 1990s. Puffalumps were discontinued again in 2007.

Fisher-Price released other merchandise such as a Panini sticker album, tote bags, Halloween costumes, books, umbrellas, and bedding to complement the Puffalump toys. A short animated film, The Wild Puffalumps, was also made to accompany the Wild Puffalumps line.
