= Power Wheels =

Brand of battery-powered ride-on toy cars

- Logo
- Type: Battery-powered ride-on toy cars
- Company: Fisher-Price
- Country: United States
- Availability: 1984–present

Power Wheels is a brand of battery-powered ride-on toy cars for kids ages one to seven years old. Power Wheels ride-ons are built with kid-sized, realistic features – in some cases, real working features like FM radios, opening/closing doors and hoods, and both forward and reverse motion.

== History ==
The product itself was created by an Italian company, Peg Perego, which started in 1949. Peg-Perego eventually began using gel cell batteries in their wheeled machines, and the product line was launched. The Power Wheels brand name dates back to 1984, when San Francisco-based toy company Kransco acquired Pines of America, makers of battery-powered vehicles for children. Kransco renamed the line "Power Wheels".

In 1994, the Power Wheels Line was bought by Mattel, who placed it under their Fisher-Price subsidiary.

In 1999, Fisher-Price announced the Harley-Davidson Motorcycle ride-on toy – which contributed to a year of record sales for the entire product line.

== Power Wheels vehicles ==
Power Wheels ride-on cars, trucks, and motorcycles have been sold with more than 100 model names.

Some Power Wheels vehicles are small-scale versions of real-world vehicles, including the Jeep Wrangler, Jeep Hurricane, Ford F-150, Ford Mustang, Kawasaki KFX quad, Harley-Davidson motorcycle, Cadillac Escalade EXT. Some Power Wheels vehicles are based on children's cartoons such as Lightning McQueen from Pixar’s film Cars, and a Thomas the Tank Engine with a circle of track.

== Safety recalls ==
The first recall in 1991 involved the 18 Volt Porsche 911, in which the contacts in the foot pedal switch could weld together in use. If this were to happen, the motor would remain running and the vehicle would continue moving forward, unable to stop. A new accelerator pedal was fitted that eliminated the possibility of welded contacts.

In October 1998, Fisher-Price undertook one of its largest toy recalls, announcing that it would recall and repair up to 10 million Power Wheels 12-volt and Super 6-volt vehicles manufactured since 1986. The recall and repair program was conducted to replace battery fuses and strengthen battery connectors to prevent the units from overheating.

In 2000, Fisher-Price recalled about 218,000 battery-powered Power Wheels Harley-Davidson motorcycle ride-on toys for repair. The foot pedals, which activate the toy, could stick in the "on" position.

The Barbie Dream Camper (model FRC29), with the grey foot pedal, was recalled in 2019 due to reports that the ride-on toy continued moving after the pedal was released.
