= Herman Fisher =

American businessman (1898–1975)

- Born: Herman Guy Fisher; November 2, 1898; Unionville, Pennsylvania, United States
- Died: September 26, 1975 (aged 76); Buffalo, New York, United States

Herman Guy Fisher (November 2, 1898 – September 26, 1975), was born in Unionville Pennsylvania. He is best known as a co-founder of the toy brand Fisher-Price.

== Education ==
Fisher graduated from the Pennsylvania State University where he was a member of Sigma Pi fraternity in 1921 with a BA in Commerce and Finance.

== Career ==
In 1930, Fisher, Irving Price, Margaret Evans Price and Helen Schelle established a toy company under the name of Fisher-Price. During the Great Depression, the company manufactured 16 wooden toys which proved highly popular at the American International Toy Fair in New York City. He was president and chairman of the Fisher-Price company from its inception in 1930 to 1969. Before he retired, he sold it to the Quaker Oats Company. He was instrumental in making it the world's largest manufacturer of preschool toys.

Along with Price and Schelle, Fisher established the Fisher-Price creed: "Fisher-Price toys should have intrinsic play value, ingenuity, strong construction, good value and action." In 1938, during his tenure as the president of TMA, he led the campaign to establish the association's statistical committee.

Fisher is credited with several toy industry first. He coined the term “preschool toys” with the advent of the wooden blocks in 1934, the first to use plastic in 1950 in Queen Buzzy Bee’s wings and the creation of “National Baby Week” in the fifties.

== Recognition ==
The Fisher Plaza in the Penn State University is named after him. He donated a large amount of money "to provide an area of beauty for his alma mater where all could pause to rest, reflect, or just watch the flowers grow." In 1985, he was inducted into the Toy Industry Association's Toy Industry Hall of Fame.
