= Little People (toys) =

Toy brand

The Fisher Price Little People logo used from mid-2007 to 2013. From left to right: Eddie, Sonya Lee, Michael.

Little People is a toy brand for children ages 6–36 months and to ages 3 and up, originally produced by the American Toy company Fisher-Price, Inc. in the 1960s as the Play Family People. The current product line consists of playsets, mini-sets and accessories, books, CDs and DVDs focusing on various configurations of five characters named Eddie, Tessa, Mia, Koby, and Sofie. Mattel reports that over 2 billion Little People figures have been sold in over 60 countries. In 2016, Little People was inducted into the National Toy Hall of Fame.

The "Little People" name, registered and trademarked by Mattel and Fisher-Price in 1985, came from Mattel following the lead of consumers who referred to the early Play Family playsets as "those little people".

== History ==
=== Original Little People ===
"Safety School Bus" 1959

Little People started in 1950 with the "Looky Fire Truck" and three round-headed fire men (attached permanently to the toy). Following the success of this toy, Between 1952 and 1953, Fisher-Price developed the "Super-Jet" and "Racing Rowboat".

Another early Little People precursor, the #959 "Safety School Bus", was introduced in 1959. The set included a school bus together with six independent figures made out of tall slimmer pegs of cardboard tubes wrapped in lithographs simulating clothes. The toy gained instant popularity and other sets soon came out.

=== Little People Play Family ===
"Snorky the Fire Engine" 1960

In 1960, Fisher-Price introduced two additional toys with removable figures; "Snorky the Fire Engine" and the "Nifty Station Wagon." The Nifty Station Wagon came with two adult figures and one child figure, thus the first "Play Family" was born. In 1985, Fisher-Price trademarked "Little People" and formally changed the name of the brand. Today, Little People are known and sold throughout the world. A Nifty Station Wagon in mint condition, in the box, could command up to $1,000,000 among toy collectors.

=== Body style variations ===
"Original Little People" figures

The original Little People went through six major styles of body (base) configurations, and even within each major classification, there may be one or more minor style variations. By 1961, the figures were produced with wood; plastic was used for their vehicles and buildings. A few years later, the typical smiling face of the traditional Little People introduced in a "straight-body" format. All of the figures had a basic cylinder body with the female figures only identifiable by the addition of slanted, oval eyes and eyelashes. By 1965, the Little People figures consisted of a small cylindrical base and a wider cylinder shape for boys and men and a conical upper shape for the girls. Adult women had an hourglass-shaped upper body. The bottom portions of the bodies were indented slightly (allowing for placement in the corresponding holes in other furniture, cars and other vehicles, in which the figures were able to "sit").

=== Little People playsets ===
In 1968, Fisher-Price introduced the first Little People playset, the famous Play Family Barn with barn doors that made a "moo" sound when opened. Also at this time, the figures were made with plastic bodies instead of wood. The Play Family dollhouse was introduced in 1969, with other playsets to follow, including a firehouse, an airport and a service station. Eventually, the toys encompassed a wide range of playsets, furniture packs, and accessory packs.

In the mid-1970s, Fisher-Price produced the Sesame Street town, with different Sesame Street stores, a bridge with stop lights and Little People versions of Sesame Street characters, such as Bert, Ernie, and the show's actors Loretta Long (Susan), Roscoe Orman (Gordon), and Will Lee (Mr. Hooper). Soon after, the Little People Discovery Airport, a hospital, and a school would also be released. Little People characters had by then been also produced with plastic products exclusively.

In 1988, Marvel Productions made an animated series of six Little People videos such as Favorite Songs, 3 Favorite Stories, A Visit to the Farm, Fun With Words, Jokes, Riddles and Rhymes, and Christmas Fun, which were released by New World Video, which the deal was signed in August 1987. This video series centered around two children named Timmy and Penny and their Baby Sister, their parents, and their dog Lucky.

In 2019, a line of celebrity Little People was launched with playsets including Kiss Little People and The Beatles "Yellow Submarine" Little People.

=== Choking risk ===
In 1987 the company paid a $2.5 million settlement to the parents of Iain Cunningham after their son became physically and mentally disabled after choking on a figurine.

In 1990, New York Attorney General Robert Abrams negotiated a settlement with Fisher-Price in which the company agreed to post a more specific choking hazard warning label on the boxes of Little People toys.

A book published in 1986 by Edward Swartz titled Toys That Kill prominently featured three original Little People figures on the cover and featured the Iain Cunningham case. The American Museum Of Tort Law features an exhibit on the Little People choking hazard.

While the product was re-designed in 1991 to become chunkier and therefore harder to for children to swallow, Fisher-Price contended that the redesign was not in response to choking deaths and that the Little People figurines are safe when they are played with by children of the appropriate age. In response to the choking deaths, the company launched the "Family Alert Program" campaign in 1992 to warned parents not to let young children play with Little People playsets and other toys that are designed for older children. A Fisher-Price spokesman stated that "the original Little People were designed for children 2 to 6 and met all the safety standards for Fisher-Price, and we've never had a complaint from parents of children in that age range."

In 2010, Health Canada issued a warning that pre-1991 Little People toys should be disposed of after a recent choking death of an infant.

=== Redesigned Little People ===
In 1996, the figures underwent a drastic redesign, from simple lathe-turned shapes to sculpted bodies. Little People became much more detailed and smaller in overall size – in fact, closer in size to the original Little People. For the first time, the Little People figures had arms, hands, more detailed clothing, molded hair, and facial features.

In 1999, Little People celebrated their 40th anniversary with a reproduction of the first Little People sets: a school bus, circus train, construction vehicles, and other play sets.

In 2000, the Little People line introduced electronic sounds and movements. The Little People characters were given distinct personalities and voices in a stop motion, animated series with Phil Craig, known for starring in The Time Traveller's Wife, Cinderella Man, and Spider; and Aaron Neville singing the theme song. The series was produced by Denmark-based Egmont Imagination and Cuppa Coffee Studios and aired for two seasons between March 5, 1999 to 2005.

In 2013, the figures were redesigned to be taller and posed for more personality. The brand was rebooted in 2018, keeping the same characters, but using a simplified figure style.

=== Little People A to Z Learning Zoo ===
In 2004, Fisher-Price produced the Little People A to Z Learning Zoo. This production introduced animals to the Little People family. The A-to-Z Learning Zoo includes 26 animals that each begin with a different letter of the alphabet. This interactive play mat allows children to learn the alphabet and recognize letters. This was a significant step for the company, as education is now infused in their product.

=== Little People sets based on American football ===
- Buffalo Bills (2022)
- Pittsburgh Steelers (2022)
- Philadelphia Eagles (2023)
- Kansas City Chiefs (2023)
- Carolina Panthers (2023)
- New England Patriots (2023)
- New York Giants (2023)
- Jacksonville Jaguars (2023)
- Green Bay Packers (2023)
- Minnesota Vikings (2023)
- Chicago Bears (2023)
- Cleveland Browns (2023)
- New York Jets (2023)
- Detroit Lions (2023)
- Atlanta Falcons (2023)
- Tampa Bay Buccaneers (2023)
- Houston Texans (2023)
- Indianapolis Colts (2023)
- Washington Commanders (2023)
- Miami Dolphins (2023)
- Denver Broncos (2023)
- Cincinnati Bengals (2023)
- New Orleans Saints (2023)
- Los Angeles Chargers (2023)
- Seattle Seahawks (2023)
- Tennessee Titans (2023)
- Dallas Cowboys (2023)
- Las Vegas Raiders (2023)
- Los Angeles Rams (2023)
- Arizona Cardinals (2023)
- San Francisco 49ers (2024)
- Baltimore Ravens (2024)

=== Little People sets based on the Olympics ===
- Team USA (2020 Summer Olympics) (2021)
- Team USA (2022 Winter Olympics) (2022)

=== Other Little People Collector sets ===
- Día de los Muertos (2022)
- Inspiring Women (Amelia Earhart, Rosa Parks, Maya Angelou and Sally Ride) (2022)
- U.S. Soccer (2026)

== Sources ==
- This Old Toy's Original "Little People History"
- Behold the Little People - The Life and Death of America's Favorite Play Family by Mark Simple, in X magazine #7, July 1992
- History of Mattel
- "Mattel History". Mattel. Mattel, Inc.
- Fisher-Price Little People at Retroland
