= Rock 'n Play =

Recalled baby sleeper

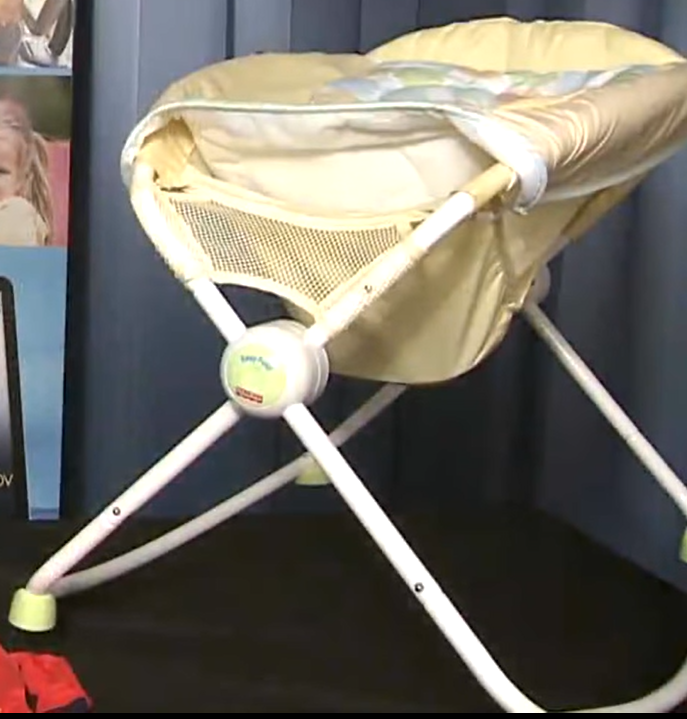
A Rock 'n Play, as seen on a recall alert from February 2013

The Rock 'n Play was a baby sleeper produced by Fisher-Price. The product launched in 2009 and sold 4.7 million units before its initial recall in 2019. Approximately 100 infant deaths have been connected with use of the sleeper. Several of the deaths were caused by infants rolling onto their stomachs and being suffocated by the sleeper's padding.

== Background ==
The product launched in 2009 and its use went against established safe sleep practices known to reduce the risk of SIDS. Reported infant deaths from the Rock 'n Play were due to asphyxia. It allowed infants to sleep at an inclined angle, with features like rocking vibration and music to soothe babies. Fisher-Price advertised it as the first sleeper that allowed babies to sleep in this position safely. The sleeper was developed in consultation with one family doctor and without any clinical research supporting its safety. Fisher-Price did not usually involve medical professionals when developing its products. A pediatrician was later hired by the company during a lawsuit about the product's liability in infant deaths. The Fisher-Price Safety Commission warned the company about safety concerns three times between 2008 and 2009. The company considered branding it as a "soother" to discourage leaving sleeping babies in the device, but market research found this label was less appealing to customers. The product was also marketed to parents whose babies had acid reflux.

The American Academy of Pediatrics' Back to Sleep campaign in the mid-1990s recommended that "babies should not sleep for long periods in inclined devices". In babies under one year old, dying during sleep is a leading cause of accidental death. The recommendation that babies sleep flat on their backs, in an empty crib, halved this death rate.

Fisher-Price advertised the sleeper using native advertising, having mom blogs promote the product on social media. It became the best-selling sleeper on Amazon.com, and it earned Fisher-Price over $200 million. Canada and Australia did not allow Fisher-Price to market the device as a sleeper due to safety concerns. The Royal College of Midwives in the United Kingdom issued a report expressing similar concerns. Fisher-Price renamed the product as the Rock 'n Play Soother to comply with Canadian labeling requirements. About 2,000 of these units were sold in Canada.

== Recalls ==
In 2013, 800,000 units were recalled due to concerns about mold. The mold could develop between the frame and fabric of the product if it was placed in a moist environment or not regularly cleaned. Fisher-Price received 600 reports about mold developing on Rock 'n Play units.

Several infants died in the sleeper when they rolled onto their stomachs and were suffocated by the sleeper's padding. Fisher-Price responded to the deaths by applying a warning label, instructing parents not to use the sleeper once babies were old enough to roll. The American Academy of Pediatrics stated that the product should be recalled instead. The U.S. Consumer Product Safety Commission (CPSC) mistakenly sent an unredacted safety report of its various product evaluations to Consumer Reports. This prompted the CPSC to issue its warning about the Rock 'n Play before Consumer Reports published a story on it. The CPSC notified Fisher-Price of the impending warning on April 1, 2019.

When the Rock 'n Play was initially recalled in 2019, 30 infant deaths were reported. The product was recalled again in 2023 as a result of its presence in the resale market. An additional 70 deaths took place after the initial recall. 4.7 million units were recalled. As of 2020, 395,239 units have been confirmed as being returned to the company. Other companies recalled similar sleepers that had also resulted in deaths, totaling 700,000 units. The recall became the subject of widespread national news coverage. Sleepers purchased within six months of the return were given full refunds, while owners of older units were given vouchers for partial refunds. Fisher-Price only offers refunds to sleepers purchased before 2018 and some resellers may not surrender the product to the company because of this. Some resellers are unaware the product has been recalled while others insist the product can be used safely. While Fisher-Price has worked with online platforms to remove 54,000 listings for Rock 'n Play units, they continue to be sold online, particularly on Facebook Marketplace. Rock 'n Play units have also been found in daycares.

Health Canada did not recall the product when it was recalled in the United States as the intended use was different. The Canadian Paediatric Society wrote a letter to the health minister as a result of their concerns that the units were being used as sleepers regardless of labeling. The product was recalled in Canada in May 2019.

== Legacy ==
A 2021 congressional investigation was launched as a result of these deaths. The United States House Committee on Oversight and Accountability released its 38-page report in June 2021, finding that Fisher-Price recklessly endangered children and that governmental oversight was inadequate. The CPSC revised its baby sleeper regulations in June 2021, mandating that any product marketed as a place for babies to sleep must have an incline no greater than ten degrees, standardizing sleeper regulations with those of cribs and bassinets. In 2023, the Safe Sleep for Babies Act was signed by Joe Biden, prohibiting the manufacture of inclined baby sleepers and crib bumpers.

== See also ==
- Product recall
- Infant sleep
- Safe to Sleep
