= Irving Price =

American toy manufacturer (1884–1976)

Irving Lanouette Price (September 21, 1884 – November 23, 1976) was an American toy manufacturer and co-founder of Fisher-Price Toys.

== Career ==
Along with his wife, Margaret Evans Price, as well as Helen Schelle and Herman Fisher, he was a co-founder of Fisher-Price Toys in 1930. He had a successful career as an executive with Woolworth. He retired at an early age and was elected mayor of East Aurora, New York.

== Personal life ==
Price was born in Worcester, Massachusetts, in 1884. On 23 February 1909, he married the children's book illustrator and artist Margaret Evans Price (1888–1973). Margaret was a member of the wealthy Evans family of New York who for a time had an effective monopoly on the building material industry in that city.

In 2014, debates flared on whether his former home in East Aurora should be demolished or preserved for local historical purposes. The owner of the house wanted to knock it down to make room for a parking lot. The matter was resolved on May 1, 2014, when the village trustees granted the house landmark status.
