= Construx =

Plastic building toy brand

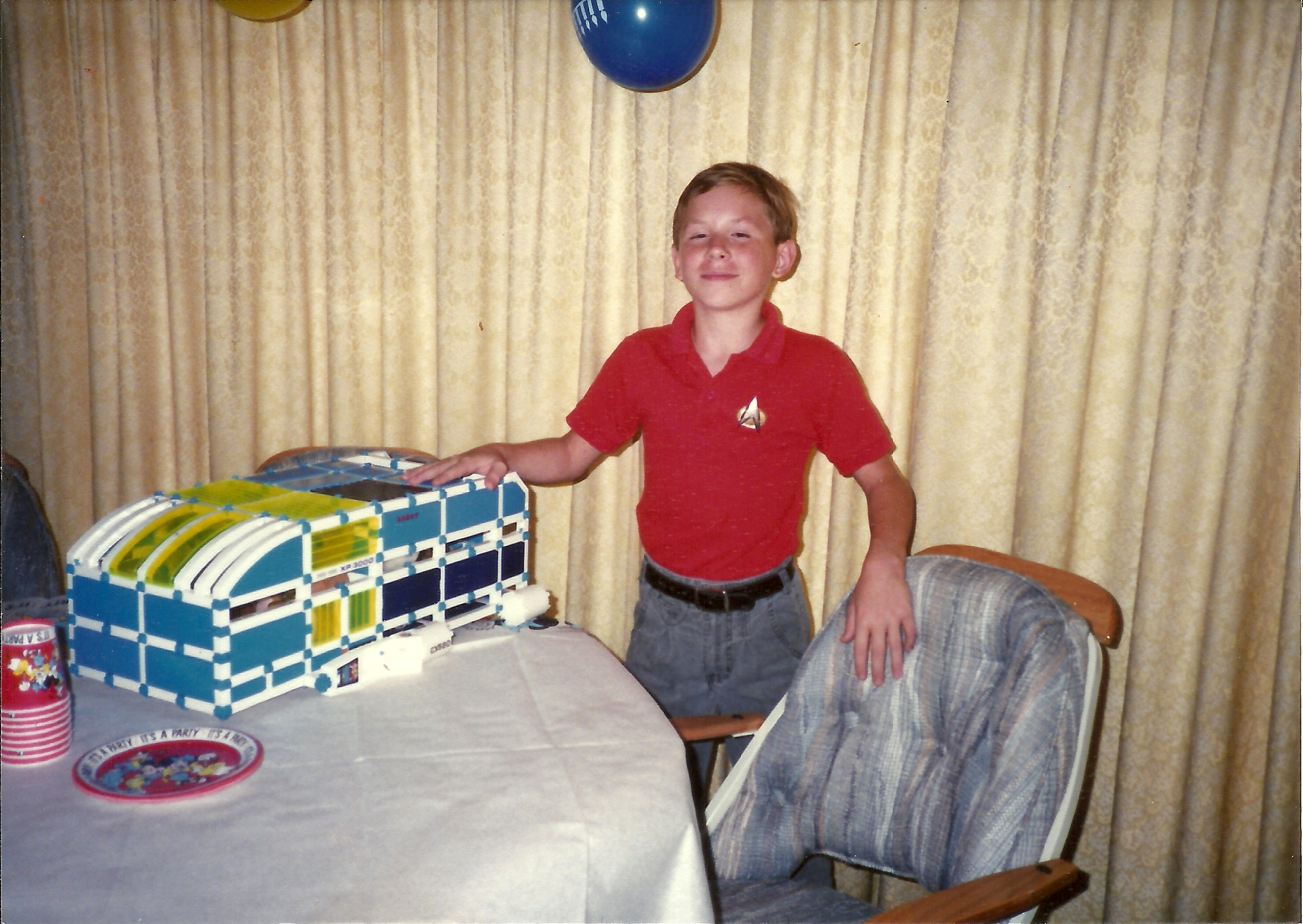
Shuttlecraft made with Construx in 1986

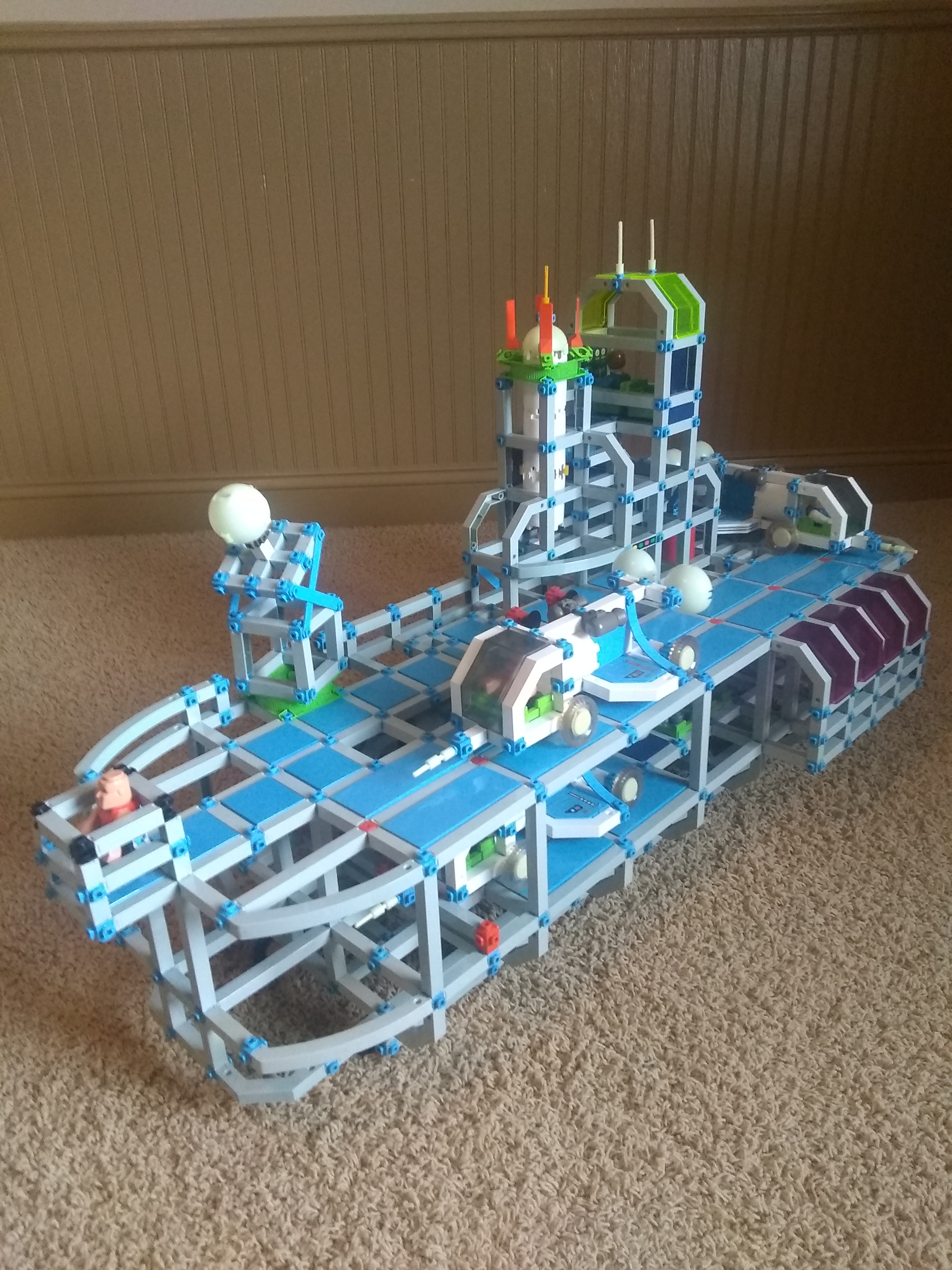
Aircraft carrier made with Construx

Construx is a brand of plastic building toys introduced by Fisher-Price in 1983. Unlike other building toys such as Lego, Construx feature beam-like pieces of varying lengths that snapped on to cubical connector knots in order to build large shapes. These are relatively secure even though no nuts or bolts were used. Panels allowed assembly of flat surfaces. Hinges, motors, wheels, and other movable parts expand the number of different shapes that can be built, and make moving creations possible. Construx was discontinued in 1988, briefly revived by Mattel in 1997, and then discontinued again. Mattel resurrected the Construx name as Mega Construx in 2017 (see Mega Bloks).

For a short time near the end of the Fisher Price run, a version targeted at younger children was released called Basix Construx. It used bright primary colors and did not contain the more complex pieces such as axles and pulleys. This version as well as the other boxes released in the 1997 revival included several new pieces.
