= ABCya =

Educational gaming website

ABCya.com, L.L.C.
- Logo since 2018
- Industry: Educational Children Games
- Founded: 2004; 22 years ago
- Founder: Alan Tortolani
- Headquarters: Providence, Rhode Island, U.S.
- Key people: Lisa Tortolani (CEO)
- Parent: IXL Learning
- Website: www.abcya.com

ABCya.com, L.L.C. (also stylized as ABCya!) is an American website that provides educational games and activities for school-aged children. The games on the website are organized into grade levels from pre-kindergarten to Sixth grade, as well as into subject categories such as letters, numbers, and holidays. Many of the games meet standards associated with the Common Core State Standards Initiative.

== History ==
ABCya.com was founded in 2004 by Alan Tortolani. A public school teacher, Tortolani created his own activities for his students. Later, he decided to register a domain under ABCya.com. Tortolani chose this particular domain name "ABCya" to make it accessible to children and easy to type into a web browser.

In April 2020, Lisa Tortolani took over as chief executive officer.

The company was acquired by IXL Learning in 2021.

== Works ==
ABCya.com has developed and published many apps for iPhone and iPad including:

=== Math Bingo ===
Math Bingo allows adults to practice their math facts by answering simple math questions and selecting the correct answer in the bingo grid. It has been featured in The New York Times, O'Reilly Media’s Best iPads Apps book, Scholastic Parent & Child, Disney Family Fun Magazine, 2014 Apps for iPad & iPhone, and iPhone App Directory.

=== Create a Car ===
"Create a Car" allows children to use their imagination to create a car. This app has been featured in 101 Top iPad Apps for Kids: Educational & Fun, The 2011 iPad Handbook, and iPad for Beginners.

== Awards ==
- Parents' Choice Award – Spring 2014 Websites
- Parents' Choice Silver Honor – Spring 2014 Mobile Apps for the ABCya! Animate app
