= Fisher Price Ready for School =

1996 video game

- Publishers: Davidson & Associates
- Platform: Windows
- Release: 1996

Fisher Price Ready for School is an educational video game from Davidson & Associates. The game is for ages 4 to 6.

== Gameplay ==
Fisher-Price Ready for School is a multimedia educational game designed for children ages 4 to 6, helping them develop early learning and social skills before starting kindergarten. The game takes place in the animated town of Kinderville, where children can explore various locations, each offering activities focused on different educational concepts:

- Randi's Wacky Word Factory – Teaches three-letter words using a bubble machine.
- Telly the Telephone – Helps children learn phone etiquette and number patterns.
- Tick-Tock's Tower – Introduces telling time with both analog and digital clocks.
- Clara's Calendar Corner – Teaches months and seasons with interactive stickers.
- Chaz's Construction Junction – Covers safety and manners through hidden picture puzzles.
- Clarence's Concert Hall – Uses musical instruments to teach counting and number recognition.
- Sandy's Snack Shop – Introduces basic addition and subtraction.
- Penny's Post Office – Focuses on sorting, matching, and recognizing colors, shapes, and sizes.
- J.J.'s Hop – Uses alliterative phrases to teach letter and sound recognition.
- Design Depot – Encourages creativity through shape matching and pattern recognition.

The game also comes with four pre-printed activity books designed to enhance early learning in math, reading, writing, social skills, and safety. A built-in print kit enables children to print pages for additional practice.

For parents, a second CD-ROM provides expert advice on early childhood development, including a video guide featuring educational specialists discussing school readiness and learning strategies.

== Reception ==
Reception

Review scores
Publication	Score
Evansville Courier and Press	3/4
The News-Press	2.5/4

The game ranked 7th on PC Data's list of Top-Selling Home Education Software for the first half of 1996. It also ranked as the 10th on PC Data's list of top-selling educational games for June 1996.

Fisher Price Ready for School later appeared on PC Data's sales chart in 1998.
