= Explore Technologies =

American toy company

Coordinates: 37.38351°N 121.98021°W

Explore Technologies, Inc.
- Company type: Private
- Industry: Edutainment industry
- Founded: 1995; 30 years ago
- Headquarters: 2880 Lakeside Drive, Sunnyvale, California, U.S.
- Products: Edutainment toys

Explore Technologies, Inc. was founded in Sunnyvale, California in 1995. The company was acquired by LeapFrog on July 22, 1998. The explore team produced $99 and $129 versions of the Odyssey globe released under the LeapFrog label in 1999. The NearTouch technology was then applied to the LeapPad learning platform also released in 1999.
