= Corn Popper =

Toy manufactured by Fisher-Price

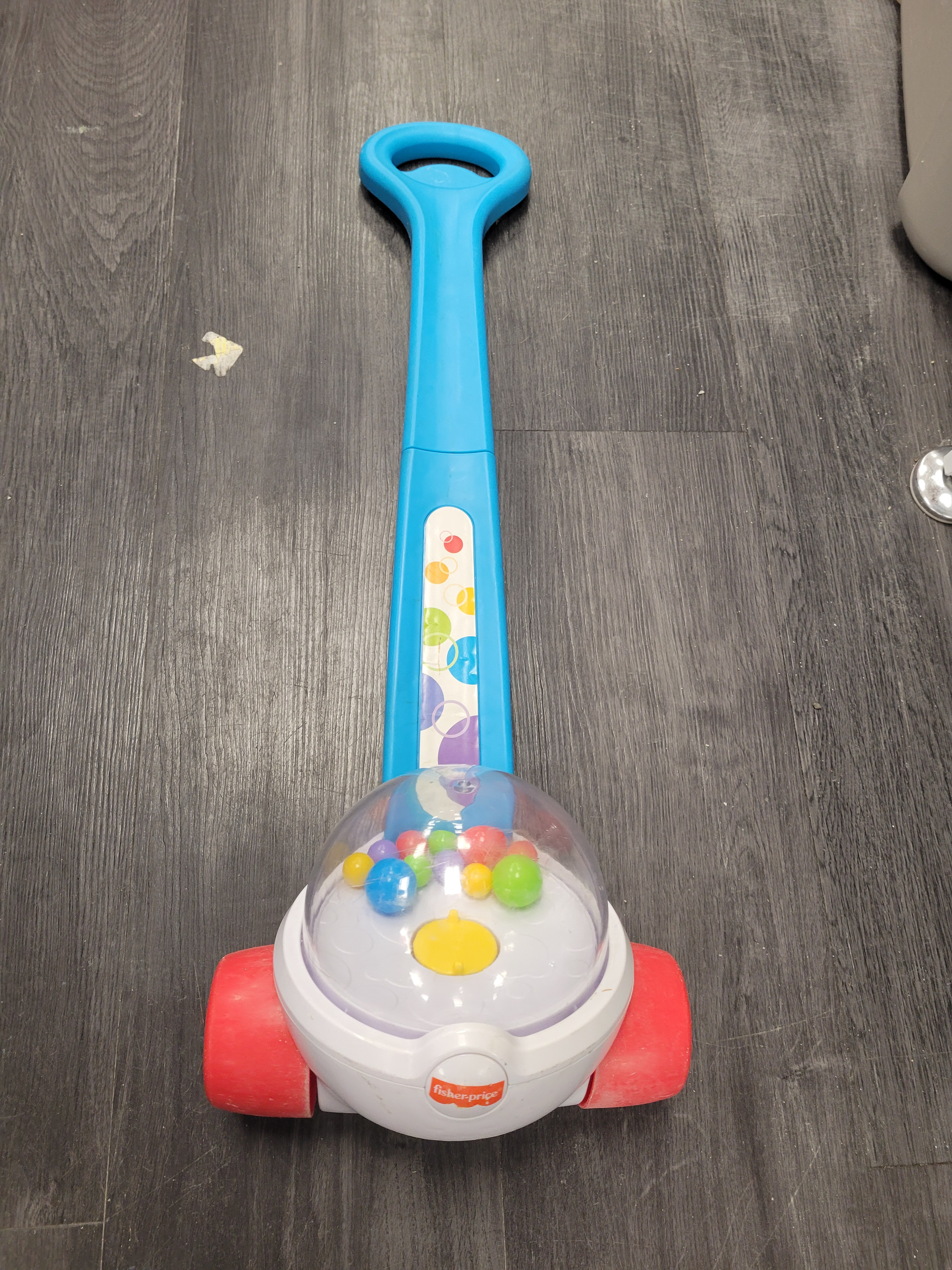
- A Corn Popper, laying flat on the ground.
- Invented by: Arthur Holt
- Company: Fisher-Price
- Country: United States
- Availability: 1957–present

The Corn Popper is a toy manufactured by Fisher-Price since 1957. Aimed at preschoolers, when the Corn Popper is pushed or pulled, colored balls inside a plastic dome bounce and create a popping, bouncing noise. The movement and noise created by the toy motivate the child to move forward using the handle and wheels, training their motor and spatial skills.

== History ==
The Corn Popper was invented in 1957 by Arthur Holt, and sold to Fisher-Price for $50. Was designed to help children learn to walk. It sends tiny, colorful, gumball-size balls flying and hitting the plastic dome, to create a loud popping noise.

It was inducted into the National Toy Hall of Fame in 2023.
