= Dictionary.com =

Online dictionary

- Website type: Dictionary
- Available in: English
- Owner: IXL Learning
- Creators: Brian Kariger; Daniel Fierro
- Website: dictionary.com
- Commercial: Yes
- Launched: May 14, 1995; 31 years ago

Dictionary.com is an online dictionary whose domain was first registered on May 14, 1995. The primary content on Dictionary.com is a proprietary dictionary based on the Random House Unabridged Dictionary, with editors for the site providing new and updated definitions. Supplementary content comes from the Collins English Dictionary, American Heritage Dictionary and others. It is owned by IXL Learning.

== History ==
Dictionary.com was founded by Brian Kariger and Daniel Fierro as part of Lexico Publishing, which also started Thesaurus.com and Reference.com. At the time of its launch, it was one of the web's first in-depth reference sites. In July 2008, Lexico Publishing Group, LLC, was acquired by Ask.com, an IAC company, and renamed Dictionary.com, LLC. In 2018, IAC sold Dictionary.com and Thesaurus.com to Rock Holdings. At the time of the sale, Dictionary.com was the 447th most trafficked website in the United States, according to the website tracking service SimilarWeb. In 2015, they estimated that there are 5.5 billion word searches a year on its site. In 2024, Rock Holdings sold Dictionary.com and Thesaurus.com to IXL Learning.

In July 2025, the site deleted all user accounts and removed its ad-free Pro app.

== Features ==
Among its features, Dictionary.com offers a Word of the Day, a crossword solver, and a pop culture dictionary that includes emoji and slang sections.

In 2010, Dictionary.com began a Word of the Year feature with the word change. The selection is based on search trends on the site throughout the year and the news events that drive them. Dictionary.com's words of the year have been:

- 2010: change
- 2011: tergiversate
- 2012: bluster
- 2013: privacy
- 2014: exposure
- 2015: identity
- 2016: xenophobia
- 2017: complicit
- 2018: misinformation
- 2019: existential
- 2020: pandemic
- 2021: allyship
- 2022: woman
- 2023: hallucinate
- 2024: demure
- 2025: 67
- 2026: maxxing

In April 2009, they launched an app on the Apple App Store allowing users to find definitions and synonyms. It also included audio pronunciations, alphabetical indexing, and synonym example sentences. Since then, Dictionary.com released a standalone thesaurus app called Thesaurus Rex along with education apps, Dictionary.com Flashcards, Word Dynamo, and Learning to Read with Zoo Animals.

In early 2020, in response to COVID-19 quarantine home-schooling needs, Dictionary.com launched an interactive platform for learning at home, and an online tutoring service. Later that year Dictionary.com's sister site, Thesaurus.com, launched a writing assistant and grammar checker called Grammar Coach. The coronavirus outbreak led to the addition of novel words to the main dictionary (e.g., fomite) and the slang dictionary (e.g., rona).

== See also ==
- Lexico
- Lists of dictionaries
