= Scholastic Parent & Child =

US magazine

- Editor-in-chief: Jane Isabel Nussbaum
- Categories: Parenting
- Frequency: 8 per year
- First issue: 1993
- Final issue: August–September 2015
- Company: Scholastic
- Country: US
- Based in: New York City
- Language: English
- Website: www.scholastic.com
- ISSN: 1070-0552

Parent & Child Magazine was a magazine published by Scholastic. The award-winning magazine was founded in 1993 in Jefferson City, Missouri, as Scholastic's contribution to the parenting magazine category. Competitors included Parents and FamilyFun. Parent & Child highlighted the following editorial topics: activities and crafts, reading and education, children's development, health, and wellness, family recipes, and family time. The magazine also produced a kids website and a free mobile app, KidQ. Jane Nussbaum was editor in chief since 2013. According to an announcement from Cision, Scholastic Parent & Child ceased publication, with its August/September 2015 issue being its last."

== Editorial sections ==
- Busy Minds
- Happy+Healthy
- Me Time
- Easy Eats
- Together Time

== Staff ==
- Editor-in-chief: Jane Isabel Nussbaum
- Art director: Jennie Utschig
- Integrated content director: Elizabeth Anne Shaw
- President, consumer and professional publishing: Hugh Roome
- Vice president, publisher: Jamie Engel
