= IXL Learning =

Online education website

- Former name: Quia Web
- Available in: 120+ languages
- Founded: 1998
- Country of origin: United States
- Area served: Worldwide
- Founder: Paul Mishkin
- Industry: Online learning
- Services: Online learning curriculum, personalized learning
- Subsidiaries: Vocabulary.com, NoRedInk, ABCYa
- Website: https://www.ixl.com
- Commercial: Yes
- Registration: Yes
- Users: 18 million (students)
- Launched: 1998
- Current status: Active

IXL Learning is an online education website available in 120+ languages. It is an American-based website and is headquartered in San Mateo, California, in the Silicon Valley region.

== Overview ==
IXL Learning provides years spanning from kindergarten to year 12. The site provides Maths, Textbook and Exam alignments, and adaptive worksheets. The site provides 2,000 pre-recorded video tutorials on the site instructing users what to do. The site also contains System gaming.

== History ==
IXL Learning was founded in 1998 by former software engineer Paul Mishkin. At the time, the sites name was previously called Quia Web which stands for Quantitative Universal Intelligent Assistant. It became the internet's first and earliest sites that allowed teachers to customise and build stuff such as educational games, quizzes, and flashcards. In 2001, IXL Learning released Quia Books which was an adaptation which on the site is an interactive digital textbook and workbook.

The site was renamed to IXL Learning in 2007. Between 2007 and 2017, the platform scaled out of early elementary grades into high school levels, eventually adding comprehensive, standalone pipelines for English Language Arts, Science, Social Studies, and Spanish. In 2018, IXL Learning acquired ABCya, the creator of over 400 educational computer games and apps for kids.

In 2019, IXL Learning acquired Education.com. In 2020, IXL Learning acquired Vocabulary.com, the leading vocabulary acquisition program. In 2024, IXL Learning introduced Takeoff by IXL Math, and introduced Dictionary.com. In June 2026, IXL Learning had about 200 billion questions were answered by the students that use it. In October 2026, IXL Learning Acquired NoRedInk in a major expansion of its English Language Arts (ELA) portfolio, IXL officially acquired NoRedInk. Media coverage highlights that the acquisition integrates NoRedInk's scaffolded writing prompts, guided essay reviews, and adaptive critical thinking exercises into IXL's broader ecosystem.

== Lawsuits ==
=== Shanahan v. IXL Learning ===
In May 2024, lawsuits were filed by three mothers on behalf of public-school students in Kansas. The lawsuits were directed towards IXL Learning due to complaints that state IXL Learning extracts names, student IDs, parent emails, device fingerprints, settlement locations, browsing patterns, and every submitted answer. Crucially, it alleges the platform logs highly sensitive demographic details like gender, race, and ethnicity. IXL claimed that under the Children’s Online Privacy Protection Act (COPPA), schools act as "agents" capable of signing away a parent's right to sue. In August 2024, the US Federal Trade Commission (FTC) took the rare step of filing a unanimous 5-0 amicus brief explicitly rejecting IXL Learning's defense. FTC Chair Lina Khan publicly noted that while COPPA allows schools to consent to data collection for purely educational purposes, it does not give school districts the authority to strip parents of their constitutional right to a jury trial. IXL Learning tried to block the lawsuit from moving forward in open court, arguing that because school districts signed their Terms of Service which contain a mandatory arbitration clause which the parents and children were legally bound to resolve disputes privately.

In April 2026, the Ninth Circuit issued a ruling that partially sent the issue back to the lower court, stating that the district judge needs to re-evaluate the "burden of proof on mutual assent" to determine if a valid agency relationship existed between the school and parents. While the legal technicalities regarding arbitration continue to twist through the appellate system, the class action remains a highly scrutinized landmark case for student data in the educational technology sector.

== See also ==
- I-Ready
