= North American International Toy Fair =

Annual trade show for the toy industry in New York City, USA

- Toy Fair logo used in 2006
- Status: Active
- Genre: Toys
- Venue: Jacob K. Javits Convention Center
- Location: New York City
- Country: United States
- Inaugurated: February 1903
- Attendance: 30,000 in 2013
- Organizer: The Toy Association
- Website: toyfairny.com

The North American International Toy Fair (formerly the American International Toy Fair and also known as Toy Fair New York) is an annual toy industry trade show held in mid-February in New York City's Jacob K. Javits Convention Center and at toy showrooms around the city. The event is open to the toy trade only – toy industry professionals, retailers, and press representatives. It is produced by the Toy Association. Toy Fair New York's promoters describe it as the largest toy trade show in the Western hemisphere.

== History ==
Toy Fair began in February 1903. The first event featured less than ten toy companies; with model trains from Lionel among the featured products. As the event expanded, more space was needed. As a result toy companies started occupying 200 Fifth Avenue, then known as the Fifth Avenue Building, in 1910. By 1925, the concentration of toy companies led to the building name changing to the International Toy Center.

The 117th annual Toy Fair, held February 22–25, 2020 at the Jacob K. Javits Convention Center, attracted tens of thousands of play innovators (manufacturers, distributors, importers, sales agents, inventors, entrepreneurs, licensors, retail buyers) to preview toys and games across 445,817 net square feet of exhibit space. Nearly 1,000 members of the press attended to report on the top toy trends. Overall, approximately 100 countries were represented at the show.

The 2021 Toy Fair was cancelled to the COVID-19 pandemic. While the show planned to return in 2022, the event was cancelled due to COVID-19 for a second year in a row in January 2022, after multiple major exhibitors announced that they would not participate due to concerns over the Omicron variant. The Toy Association CEO Steve Pasierb stated that they were obligated to "make the best decision in everyone's interest no matter how heartbreaking for so many and potentially damaging some business’ future prospects." The event returned in 2023, but it was held instead from September 30 to October 3 instead of the usual February schedule, while the 2025 event was held in March. The 2026 event returned to its February schedule.

== Venues ==
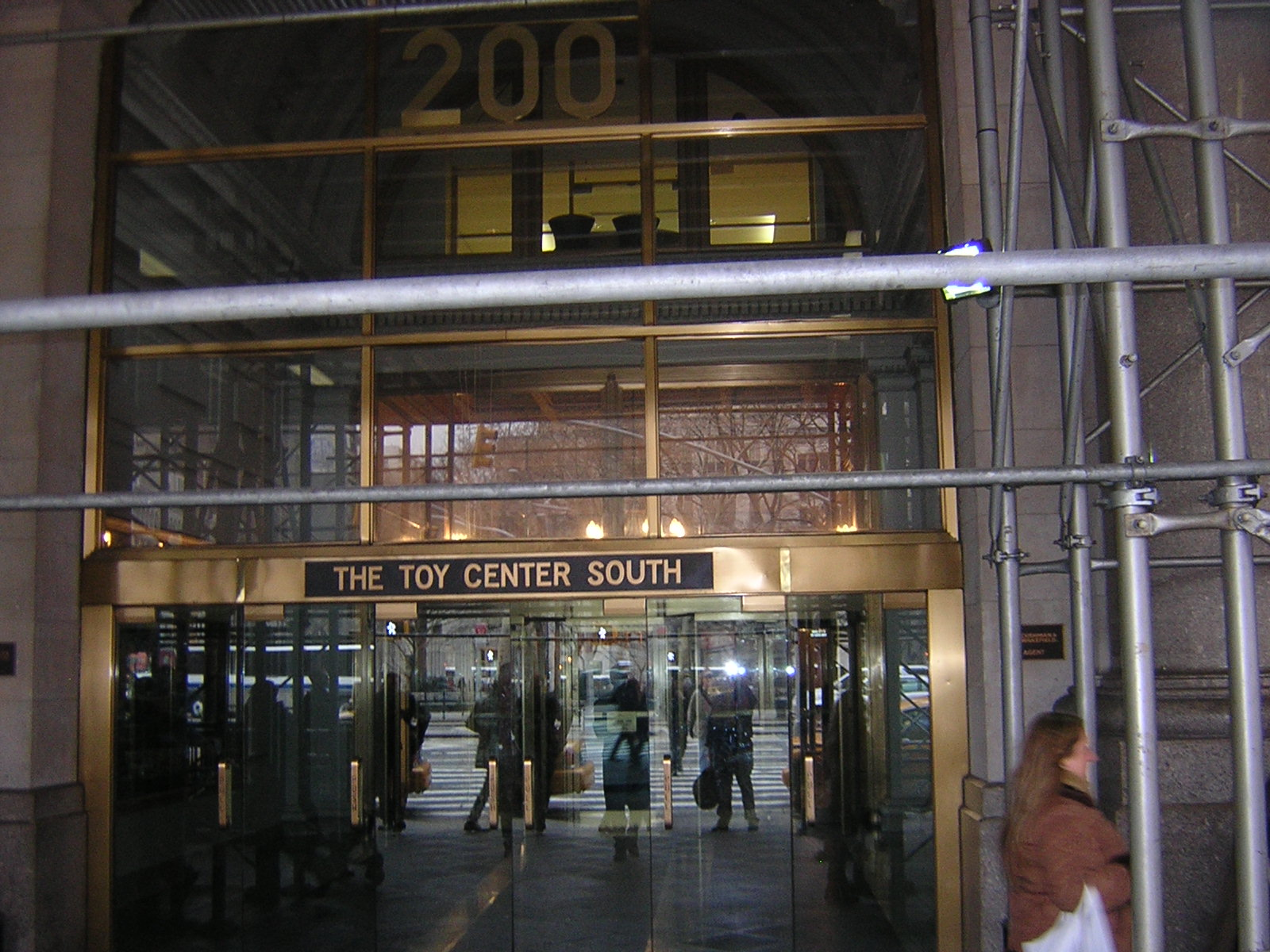
200 Fifth Avenue

The Javits Center exhibits feature demonstrations and displays in a mostly open trade show setting. Historically, toy district showrooms near the Flatiron building also allowed buyers to consult with sales representatives from the major toy manufacturers in a quieter setting. Each building (they were interconnected by upper story walkways) contained relatively small showrooms from many manufacturers. Products featured included current lines as well as samples of products not yet introduced, or products under development. Many manufacturers staged receptions or events prior to the fair itself for invited buyers, media representatives, or dignitaries.

== Attendance ==
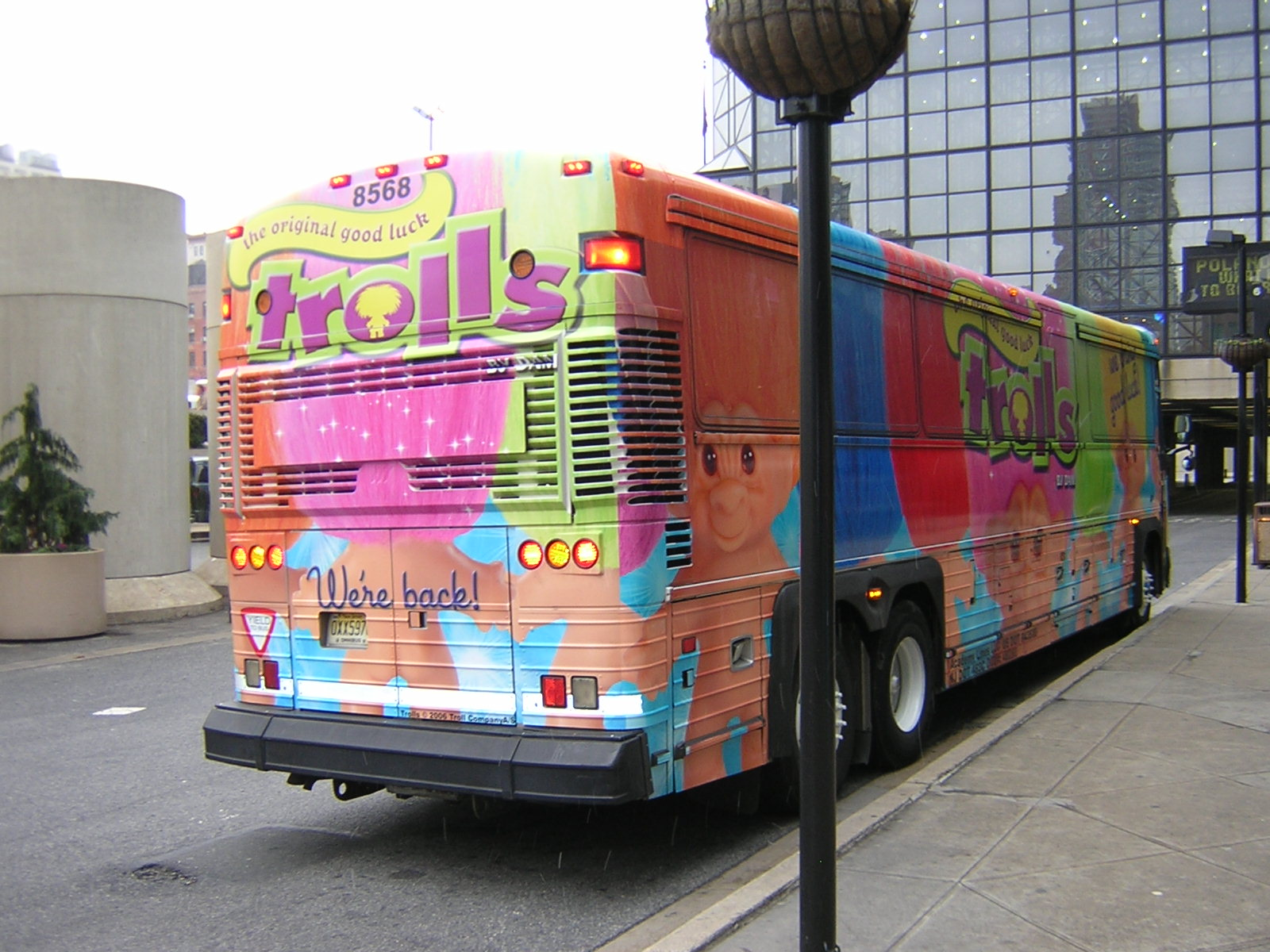
Trolls (toy) decorated bus

Registration is open to the trade only. Admission for buyers is free, but proof of participation in the toy industry is required. Admission for toy manufacturer employees and media is not free, and credentials are required. Attendees must be aged 18 years or older.
