= Hassenfeld =

Hassenfeld is a surname. Notable people with the surname include:

- Alan G. Hassenfeld (1948–2025), American businessman
- Stephen D. Hassenfeld (1942–1989), American businessman
- Sylvia Hassenfeld (1920–2014), American communal leader, philanthropist, and human rights advocate
