= Women's League =

Women's League may refer to:

== Sports ==
=== Association football ===
==== Africa ====
- Libyan Women's League, top flight of women's association football in Libya
- Malawi Women's League (also called Elite Women's League), top flight of association football in Malawi
- National Women's League (former name of Ghana Women's Premier League), top division league for women's football in Ghana
- SAFA Women's League, top flight of women's association football in South Africa
- Seychelles Women's League, top flight of women's association football in Seychelles

==== Americas ====
- Women's League Soccer, regional semi-professional women's soccer league in the United States (2011–2013)

==== Asia & Middle East ====
- Indian Women's League, top-tier professional football league in the Indian football league system
  - FD Women's League, top division women's football league in the Indian National Capital Territory of Delhi
  - Goa Women's League, top division women's football league in the Indian state of Goa
  - Karnataka Women's League, top division women's football league in the Indian state of Karnataka
  - Kerala Women's League, top division women's football league in the Indian state of Kerala
  - Manipur Women's League, top division women's football league in the Indian state of Manipur
  - Odisha Women's League (previously known as FAO Women's League), top division women's football league of the Indian state of Odisha
  - Tamil Nadu Women's League, top division women's football league of the Indian state of Tamil Nadu
- Kuwaiti Women's League, first official women's football championship in Kuwait
- Liga 1 Putri (lit. 'Women's League 1'), top-flight women's football league in Indonesia
- Ligat Nashim (lit. 'Women's League'), Israeli women's football league
- National Women's League (Nepal), top division of the All Nepal Football Association in Nepal
- PFF Women's League, top-flight of association football in the Philippines
- Thai Women's League, professional association football league

==== Europe ====
- Bulgarian Women's League, top level league of women's football in Bulgaria
- Danish Women's League, top-flight semi-professional football league in Denmark
- Latvian Women's League, top level women's football league of Latvia
- Maltese Women's League, top-level women's league of football in Malta
- Montenegrin Women's League, top level women's football league of Montenegro
- Naisten Liiga (lit. 'Women's League'; former name for Kansallinen Liiga), professional association football league in Finland
- Slovenian Women's League, association football league in Slovenia
- Ukrainian Women's League, also known as the Zhinocha Liha, part of Ukrainian professional football clubs
- Welsh Premier Women's League (former name of Adran Premier), top level women's football league in Wales
- Women's League of Ireland (former name of Women's National League (Ireland)), top-level league for women's association football in the Republic of Ireland
- ÖFB-Frauenliga (lit. 'ÖFB Women's League'), top level women's football league of Austria

==== Oceania ====
- National Women's League (former name of New Zealand Women's National League), top level women's football league in New Zealand

=== Other sports ===
- Alberta Footy Women's League, Australian rules football league in North America
- American Football Women's League, defunct women's American football league (2002–2003)
- KvindeLigaen (ice hockey) (lit. 'Women's League'), premier women's ice hockey league in Denmark
- Naisten Liiga (ice hockey) (lit. 'Women's League'), top ice hockey league in the Finnish league system
- SANFL Women's League, state-level women's Australian rules football league in South Australia
- Women's League (Switzerland), top ice hockey league in the Swiss Women's Hockey League system

== Other uses ==
- African National Congress Women's League, auxiliary women's political organization of the African National Congress of South Africa
- Catholic Women's League, Roman Catholic lay organization in England and Wales
- North Korea Democratic Women's League (former name of Socialist Women's Union of Korea), mass organization for women in North Korea
- Turkish Women's League of America, women's equality and justice organization comprising Americans of Turkish origin
- Women's League for Israel, volunteer social welfare organization in Israel
- Women's League for the Spread of Co-operation, auxiliary organisation of the co-operative movement in the United Kingdom
- Women's League of Burma, community-based organisation working on the rights of women from Burma that is involved in constitution-drafting activities

== See also ==
- Women's Hockey League (disambiguation)
