= Jonathan Finlay =

British paediatric neurooncologist (1948–2026)

Jonathan Lester Finlay (16 October 1948 – 26 October 2026) was a British paediatric neuro-oncologist specialising in the management of children, adolescents and young adults with brain tumours. From 2014 to 2020, he was the director of Neuro-oncology at Nationwide Children's Hospital, where he also served as the Elizabeth and Richard Germain Endowed Chair in Pediatric Cancer. He was an emeritus professor of pediatrics and radiation oncology at The Ohio State University College of Medicine.

Finlay's work was aimed at minimising the long-term side effects of radiation therapy through his “Head Start” clinical study protocols, now in their fourth iteration, which have demonstrated significantly improved survival and quality of life for paediatric brain tumour patients around the world. The currently accruing Head Start IV protocol, open at over 50 institutions, is studying the feasibility and effectiveness of genomics-based risk stratification.

== Early life and career ==
Born in Manchester, England on 16 October 1948, the only son of Minnie and Mark Finlay, Finlay was educated at Carmel College, Wallingford, and subsequently attended medical school between 1967 and 1973 at Birmingham University, earning a B.Sc. (Hons.) in Biochemistry in 1970 and MB, ChB in 1973. He then undertook internships and residencies in paediatrics in Birmingham (including pediatric oncology under the direction of Dr. Jill Mann). In 1976, his future career path in paediatric oncology was formulated during a senior residency appointment at the Christie Hospital and Holt Radium Institute, Manchester, UK, under the direction of Dr. Patricia Morris-Jones. Between 1976 and 1980, he undertook Fellowship training in Paediatric Immunology (1976–1978) under Dr. Richard Hong and then Paediatric Haematology/Oncology (1978–1980) under Dr. Nasarollah Shahidi, both at the University of Wisconsin-Madison. Between 1980 and 2003, he held faculty positions in Paediatric Oncology at Stanford University (1980–1982), the University of Wisconsin-Madison (1982–1987), the Children’s Hospital of Philadelphia and the University of Pennsylvania (1987–1989), the Memorial Sloan-Kettering Cancer Center and Cornell University (1989–1997) and the Stephen Hassenfeld Children's Blood & Cancer Center at New York University (1997–2003). Additionally, he held the posts of vice-chair of the Department of Pediatrics at Memorial Sloan-Kettering Cancer Center, and of Director of the Pediatric Oncology Program at New York University and of the Neuro-oncology Program at the New York University Comprehensive Cancer Center.

Between 2003 and 2014, he served as Director of the Neuro-oncology Program at the Children's Hospital Los Angeles and Professor of Pediatrics at the Keck School of Medicine of University of Southern California. In 2013, he was appointed to the Audrey and Billy Wilder Chair in Neuro-oncology and Director of a new, inter-departmental Neuro-oncology Program at Children's Hospital Los Angeles. In July 2014, he assumed his current position as Professor of Pediatrics at The Ohio State University and Director of Neuro-oncology at Nationwide Children's Hospital in Columbus, Ohio; in 2015, he was appointed to the Elizabeth and Richard Germain Endowed Chair in Pediatric Cancer at Nationwide Children's Hospital, Columbus, Ohio.

From January 2024, he worked part-time as a local community general paediatric practitioner in Pismo Beach, California; during this time, he continued his academic contributions to paediatric, adolescent and adult nueuro-oncology, particularly in the areas of early childhood CNS embryonal tumours, choroid plexus carcinomas and primary CNS germ cell tumours.

For more than 40 years he authored and co-authored more than 350 peer-reviewed publications, review articles and book chapters. From 1985 he delivered more than 380 invited lectures globally, mainly on childhood brain tumours.

He served on the Editorial Boards of several leading medical journals, and on the Advisory Boards and/or as medical director of several national and international philanthropic foundations devoted to childhood cancer, and to childhood brain tumours in particular. Between 2006 and 2012, he served as the founding chair of the international Society of Neuro-oncology's International Outreach Committee, whose goal is to facilitate educational and technological improvements in the management of brain tumors of adults and children in low-income countries.

== Personal life and death ==
Finlay was married to Adriana Maria Finlay of Uberaba, Brazil; they lived in Nipomo, California, with their four dogs. He had a daughter, Anna Victoria Finlay, who lives and works in the world of fashion in New York City. His ‘extramural activities’ included: wine tasting; cooking; movies; and opera (from Monteverdi to Tommy (The Who)).

Finlay died on 26 October 2026, at the age of 78.

== Awards and honors ==
- 2001: Society for Neuro-oncology Award for Excellence in Pediatric Cancer Research
- 2012: Elected Fellow of the Royal College of Physicians of London (FRCP)
- 2012: Society for Neuro-oncology Award for Excellence in Pediatric Cancer Research
- 2016: Society for Neuro-oncology of Latin America (SNOLA) International Achievement Award of the Society of Neuro-oncology
- 2019: Society for Neuro-oncology Lifetime Achievement Award (the first pediatric subspecialist to receive this award)
- 2022: International Symposium for Pediatric Neuro-oncology Lifetime Achievement Award. https://www.nkore.com/dr-jonathan-finlay
