= Beatrice Alexander =

American dollmaker

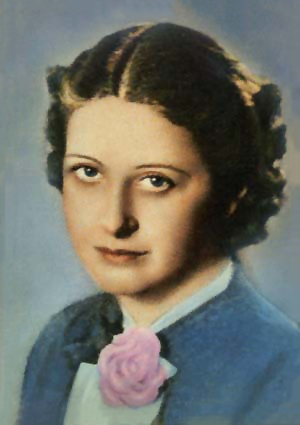
- Publicity shot of Beatrice Alexander for the Alexander Doll Company, circa 1930s
- Born: Bertha Alexander; March 9, 1895; New York City, U.S.
- Died: October 3, 1990 (aged 95); Palm Beach, Florida, U.S.
- Other name: Madame Alexander
- Education: Washington Irving High School, New York City
- Occupations: Founder and owner
- Years active: 1923–1988
- Employer: Alexander Doll Company
- Known for: Collectible dolls
- Spouse: Philip Behrman
- Children: 2

Bertha "Beatrice" Alexander Behrman (March 9, 1895 – October 3, 1990), known as Madame Alexander, was an American dollmaker. Founder and owner of the Alexander Doll Company in New York City for 65 years, she introduced new materials and innovative designs to create lifelike dolls based on famous people and characters in books, films, music, and art. Among her notable creations were the Scarlett O'Hara doll, the Dionne quintuplets dolls, and a 36-doll set of the royal family and their guests at the 1953 coronation of Queen Elizabeth II. During her stewardship, the company produced more than 5,000 dolls, many of which became collector's items.

== Early life and family ==
Bertha Alexander was born on New York City's Lower East Side to Hannah Pepper, an Austrian native who had emigrated to the United States via Russia. Bertha's father either died in a pogrom in Russia from which her mother escaped, or he emigrated with Hannah and died in New York when Bertha was about one and a half years old.

In New York, Hannah aka Channy aka Anna remarried, to Maurice Alexander, a Russian–Jewish immigrant whom Bertha considered her real father, and had three more daughters Jennie aka Jean, Florence aka Flora and Rose aka Rosie. In the 1910 census, Morris is listed as a toydealer with a pushcart. It has been said that Morris operated the first "doll hospital" in the United States, repairing the porcelain dolls of wealthy clients. However, there were doll hospitals in the US prior to his arrival in the United States. Morris and his family first appear in 1905 in the NY State census

While there has not yet been found a list of graduates, it seems Bertha graduated from Washington Irving High School in 1913 Washington Irving High School. On June 28, 1914, in Manhattan, NY, Bertha married Philip Behrman (misspelled Behlman on the Certificate), Philip Behrman, worked in the office of a hat company. Bertha enrolled in a six-month commercial course and then began working as a bookkeeper for the Irving Hat Stores.

== Career ==
I didn't want to make just ordinary dolls with unmeaning, empty smiles on their painted lips and a squeaky way of saying 'mama' after you pinched. I wanted to do dolls with souls. You have no idea how I labored over noses and mouths so that they would look real and individual.

— Beatrice Alexander

In 1915 in the NY State census, Bertha, Philip and baby Mildred were living with his family at 20 E 111th Street. It says he is a hatter and she does housework.

Alexander crafted her first doll during World War I. Due to the embargo on German-made products during wartime, porcelain dolls were no longer available and Maurice's doll hospital was on precarious footing. Alexander suggested creating a Red Cross Nurse cloth doll with hand-painted, three-dimensional facial features. She and her sisters sewed a variety of these dolls to sell in the doll hospital, priced at $1.98 apiece, thus rescuing the family's livelihood. She and her sisters continued producing cloth dolls after the war ended. In 1917, according to Philp's World War 1 draft card, they were living at 945 East 181st St., Bronx Park South.

In 1923, with a $1,600 loan, she established the Alexander Doll Company in a one-room studio, employing her sisters and neighbors, a total of 16 people. In the mid-1920s, she entreated her husband to quit his job and become the company manager, threatening him with divorce if he refused. Later that decade, she acquired a $5,000 loan to move the business to a storefront. In 1930, they lived at 278 Bronx Park South, in The Bronx. Philip's occupation was listed as "doll manufacturer", Bertha's was listed as "none", and they had a maid named Elva Matzen.

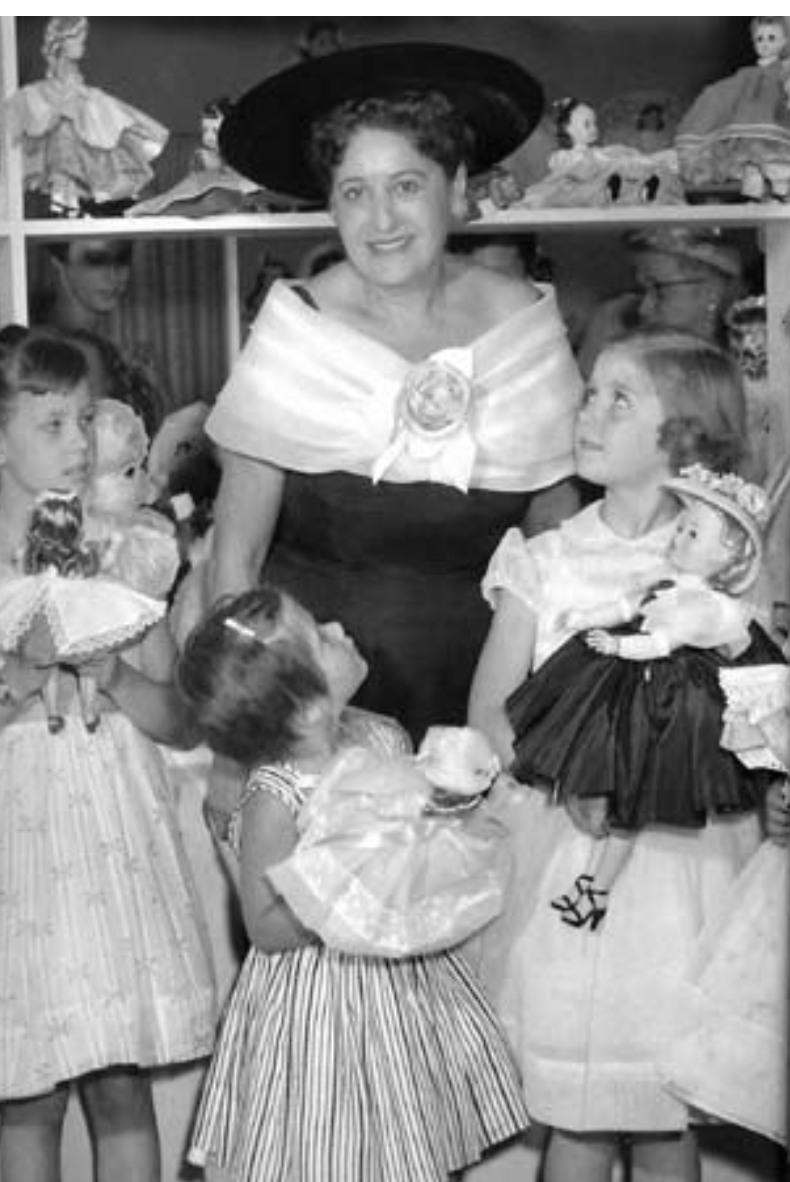
Beatrice Alexander at a Michigan store for a promotion, 1957.

With a savvy eye for marketing and innovation, Alexander became a leader in the American dollmaking industry. In 1936, Fortune magazine listed the Alexander Doll Company as one of the top three doll manufactures in the United States; the company would go on to become the largest dollmaker in the country, operating out of several factories and employing 1,500 at its peak. During the 1980s, Alexander Doll Company released more than one million dolls annually. In 1947 she began producing dolls from hard plastic, and in the 1960s turned to vinyl plastic, which rendered a more lifelike appearance. She introduced "eyes with lashes that closed and fingers with knuckles", and rooted hair that could be styled. She researched historical and cultural dress to fashion accurately detailed dolls clothing, and insisted on quality workmanship. Materials used to clothe the dolls were made of "silks, velvets, satins and other fine fabrics".

Alexander was noted for creating doll collections based on notable people and characters in books, films, music, and art. In the 1930s, for example, she reissued her Alice in Wonderland cloth doll and those of the four March sisters from Little Women to coincide with the film releases of these classics. In 1935 she procured a license from the Canadian government to craft dolls based on the Dionne quintuplets, which were big sellers and helped the business expand. She also obtained the trademarks to produce dolls replicating such famous figures as Margaret O'Brien, Jacqueline Kennedy, Coco Chanel, and Marlo Thomas. For the 1953 coronation of Queen Elizabeth II, Alexander produced a collection of 36 dolls with authentic coronation outfits replicating the royal family and guests. Then valued at $25,000, this collection was donated to the Brooklyn Children's Museum. In 1955 she unveiled the first fashion doll, Cissy, with a large bosom and high-heeled shoes, four years before Barbie was released. In the 1960s she debuted a collection of international dolls garbed in the native costumes of every member nation of the United Nations.

While Alexander intended her dolls to be playthings rather than museum pieces, many became collector's items. Older models sell for as much as $5,000. Two of her dolls – the Madame doll, a character from the American Revolution, and the Scarlett O'Hara doll, a character from the American Civil War – were added to the Smithsonian Institution in 1968. Madame Alexander dolls are also on permanent exhibition at the Congressional Club in Washington, D.C., and the Children's Trust Museum in New Delhi.

Alexander sold her company in 1988 to three private investors, staying on as a design consultant.

== Other activities ==
Alexander supported such institutions as B'nai B'rith, Weizmann Institute of Science, Harvard University, Massachusetts Institute of Technology, Planned Parenthood, Jewish Theological Seminary, Brandeis University, and American Friends of the Hebrew University. She was vice president and trustee of the Women's League for Israel, which dedicated a rose garden in her honor at one of its residences in Jerusalem. In later life, she donated to Republican Party candidates.

== Awards and honors ==
Alexander received four Fashion Academy Gold Medals from 1951 through 1954 for her doll clothing design. There were no later Fashion Academy Awards because the Federal Trade Commission issued a cease order to Fashion Academy owner Ann Hartman saying " DECEPTION IS LAID TO FASHION MEDAL; F.T.C. Charges Design Award Is Plan of New Yorkers 'to Enrich Themselves" The Alexander Doll Company was a victim, as were many other companies, who received awards via Hartman's scheme. and In 1986 Doll Reader magazine gave Alexander its Lifetime Achievement award, and FAO Schwarz named her the "First Lady of Dolls". In 2000 she was posthumously inducted into the Toy Industry Hall of Fame. In 2011 the New Rochelle Walk of Fame honored her with a historical signboard. In 2013 the Alexander Doll Company issued a Madame Alexander doll in her likeness, dressed in the style of the 1920s and priced at $1,499.95 retail.

== Personal life ==
In her twenties, Bertha renamed herself Beatrice, a more "romantic"-sounding name. In the late 1920s she began styling herself as "Madame Alexander", a name that was also appended to her doll collection.

She and her husband, Phillip Behrman (died 1966) had two children; Mildred, their first child, was born on December 31, 1914, but is listed in the 1915 Bronx, New York, New York, Birth Index, 1910-1965. Their second child, Theodore Z. born March 9, 1918 died on February 24, 1919, at age 11 months, from the 1918–1919 flu pandemic. In 1917, he and Bertha were living at 945 East 181st St. NY In 1930, they lived at 278 Bronx Park South, in The Bronx. Philip's occupation was listed as "doll manufacturer", Bertha's was listed as "none" and they had a maid named Elva Matzen. Their daughter, Mildred, an artist in her own right, was active in the Alexander Doll Company, as was Mildred's husband, Richard Birnbaum, and their son, William Alexander Birnbaum, who served as president of the Alexander Doll Company until 1994.

Alexander died in her sleep at her home in Palm Beach, Florida, on October 3, 1990, aged 95.

== Sources ==
- Brewer, Susan (2013). Famous Character Dolls. Casemate Publishers. ISBN 978-1844680948.
- Drachman, Virginia G. (2002). Enterprising Women: 250 Years of American Business. UNC Press Books. ISBN 0807854298.
- Herlocher, Dawn (2005). 200 Years of Dolls: Identification and Price Guide. Krause Publications. ISBN 0896891674.
- Goddu, Krystyna Poray (2004). Dollmakers and Their Stories: Women who changed the world of play. Henry Holt and Company. ISBN 1429925728.
