= Antonio Pasin =

Antonio Pasin (July 4, 1897 in Rosà, Vicenza, Italy – July 5, 1990 in River Forest, Illinois) was the founder of the Radio Flyer company, best known for making the Radio Flyer stamped steel toy wagon.

== Life ==
Born in Venice, Italy as the son of a cabinetmaker, Pasin moved to America in 1913 at age 16 to begin a new life in New York City. At first he had no money and did not know anyone, but invested his savings, bought used woodworking tools, and rented a one-room workshop, creating his first wagon there in 1917, naming it the Liberty Coaster after being inspired by the Statue of Liberty. He then opened a small factory west of Chicago.

After marrying fellow Italian immigrant Anna in Chicago, they had three children, two girls and one son.

== Toy wagon ==
In 1927 wanting to make a wagon affordable for every child, Pasin adopted steel stamping mass production techniques inspired by the automobile industry, earning him the nickname "Little Ford".

His first wagon was called the Radio Flyer, named after his amazement of the radio and the wonders of flight. He renamed his company the Radio Steel and Manufacturing Company in 1930. In 1933 he commissioned a 45-foot art-deco statue of a boy riding a wagon above a mini 25-cent souvenir wagon store at the Chicago World's Fair. His company became the largest producer of toy wagons, producing 1,500 wagons a day, despite the Great Depression. Business grew with the baby boom generation. Pasin's son took over the business and renamed the company Radio Flyer, expanding its offerings to include wheelbarrows, garden carts, and outdoor furniture.

Pasin died in 1990. He was inducted into the Toy Industry Hall of Fame in 2003. In 2016, his 107-year-old widow died.
