= Ellabelle Davis =

American opera singer

Ellabelle Davis (17 March 1907 — 15 November 1960) was an American singer who began her public musical career as a soloist in a concert with the Naumburg Orchestral Concerts, at the Naumburg Bandshell, Central Park, in 1940. She then went on to perform at The Town Hall in 1942. As an opera singer, Davis played the lead role of Aida during her 1946 performance at the Opera Nacional in Mexico. She resumed her role as Aida at La Scala in 1949 and recorded for Decca in February 1950. Posthumously, an opera based on Davis was performed in 2009 and she was inducted into the New Rochelle Walk of Fame in 2011.

== Early life and education ==
On 17 March 1907, Davis was born in New Rochelle, New York. Growing up, Davis was a choir singer and performed recitals together with her pianist sister. For her education, Davis was tutored by Reina LeZar and William Patterson. She was also an honorary member of Zeta Phi Beta sorority.

== Career ==
Davis began her career as a seamstress for a dressmaker in Westchester County, New York. After singing an aria from the opera Louise while she was working, Davis received a financial offer to pay for her music lessons from her customer Louise Crane. As a singer, Davis was a member of a 1941 opera held at the Museum of Modern Art. Performing solo, Davis's first concert was at The Town Hall in 1942. During a 1946 performance in Mexico, Davis became the first African-American to sing at the Opera Nacional when she played the role of Aida. She returned to the role of Aida in a 1949 edition at La Scala. Other countries that Davis performed at during her career include Finland and Israel. Outside of her tours, Davis recorded songs for Decca in February 1950. She began singing compositions by Franz Schubert and Richard Strauss at West Hampstead Studios before performing sopranos from Don Carlos and La Wally at Kingsway Hall.

== Death ==
On 15 November 1960, Davis died from cancer in New Rochelle.

== Honors ==
A 2009 opera based on Davis, titled The Gentle Lark of New Rochelle, was performed in New Rochelle. In 2011, Davis was posthumously inducted into the New Rochelle Walk of Fame.
