= Toy Industry Hall of Fame =

Toy hall of fame

Established in 1984, the Toy Industry Hall of Fame honors the contributions of toy makers internationally. The Hall of Fame is administered by the Toy Industry Foundation, a division of the United States Toy Industry Association.

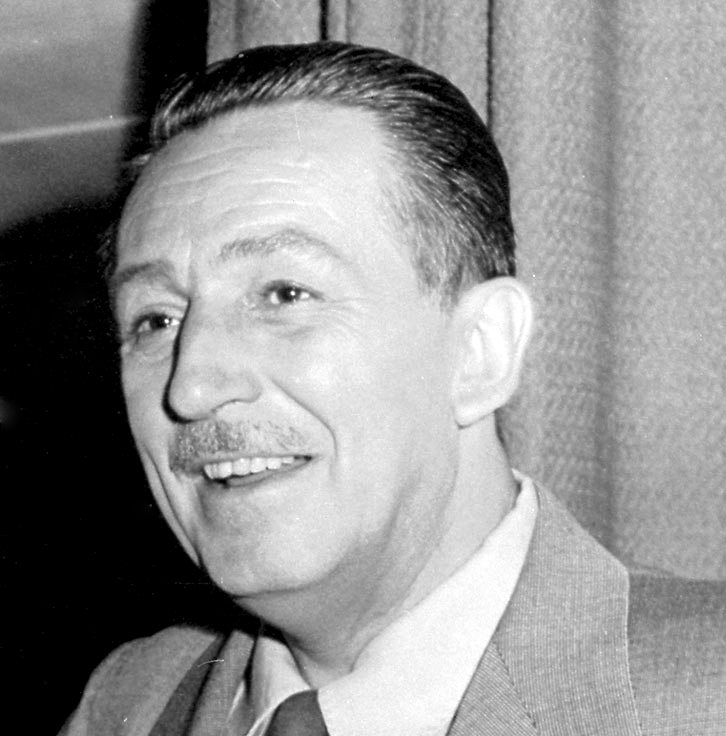
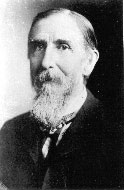
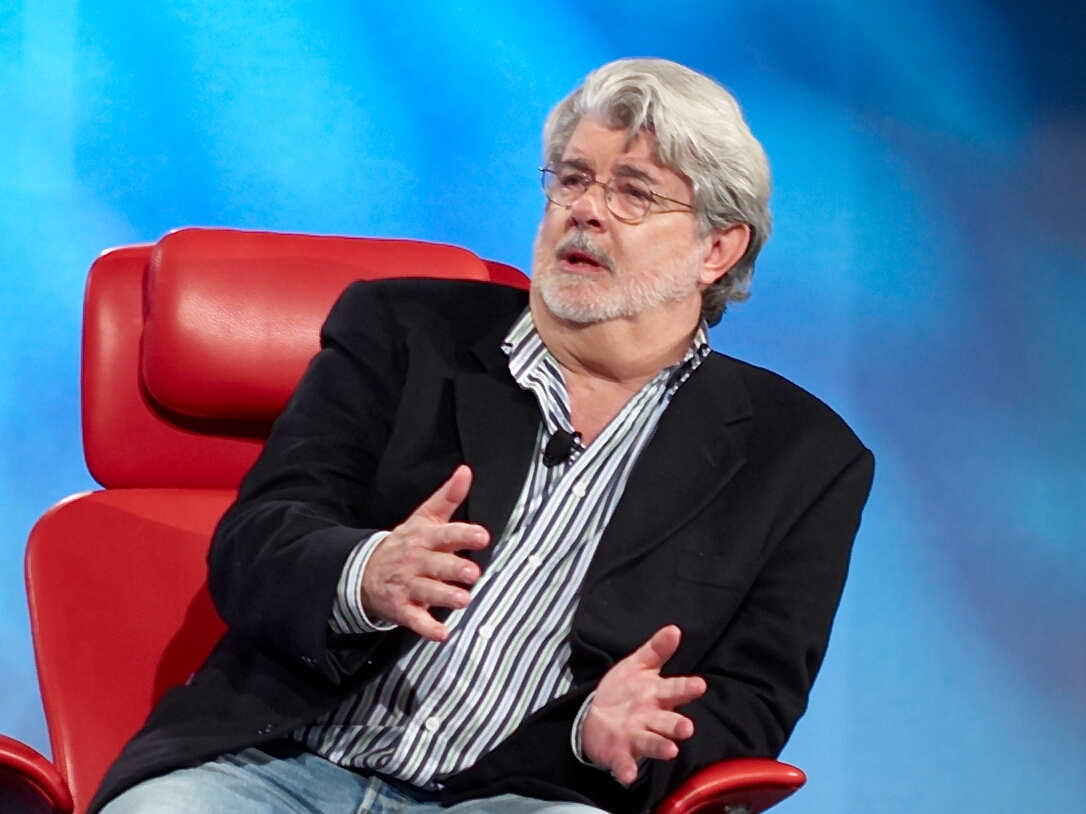
Inducted, 1985
1	Louis Marx (1896–1982)	Established Louis Marx and Company in 1921. By 1950, it was the world's largest toy manufacturer. Marx was also first to mass-produce mechanical toys in the U.S., and many of his early wind-ups are valued collector's items.
2	Merrill L. Hassenfeld (1918–1979)	Built Hasbro into a leading manufacturer of playthings from a maker of school supplies. He started with a line of doctor and nurse kits, and air raid warden sets. He oversaw the development of toys such as Mr. Potato Head and G.I.Joe.
3	Nathan Greenman (1916–1976)	Preeminent in the business of toy wholesaling, Nat Greenman devoted his entire adult life to the toy industry. With his two brothers, he joined his father's enterprise as a teenager and went on to be a major force behind the growth of Greenman Brothers, Inc., one of the largest toy wholesalers in the United States. As the company's chief merchant in its years of greatest development, he met and influenced many of the top figures from across the toy industry. Greenman often shared his views as an unofficial voice of wholesalers, He helped to shape toy distribution policy in the industry's formative years. His formula of "strength through efficiency" also helped lay the groundwork for his own firm to evolve over time into a successful multifaceted operation.
4	Marvin Glass (1914–1974)	In 1941, Marvin Glass founded the first studio for toy design - Marvin Glass and Associates. He brought successful toys to the marketplace including Mr. Machine and Rock-Em-Sock-Em Robots.
5	A.C. Gilbert (1884–1961)	The A. C. Gilbert Company created the Erector toy construction sets. It was largely due to Gilbert's determined effort and skill as an organizer that the industry's first trade association, Toy Manufacturers of America, was established in 1916.
6	Jerome M. Fryer (1918–1983)	President of CBS Toys, acquired Samuel Gabriel Sons & Co. and expanded it into a major concern, adding other established names - such as Child Guidance, Creative Playthings, Gilbert, Gym-Dandy, Hubley, Ideal, Kohner and Wonder - into what would become the CBS Toys family.
7	Herman Fisher (1898–1975)	Founded the firm of Fisher-Price and built it into the world's largest and most respected manufacturer of preschool toys.
Inducted, 1986
8	Raymond P. Wagner (1932–1985)	President of Mattel Toys (1973 to 1983).
9	Charles S. Raizen (1892–1967)	Founder of Transogram, best-remembered for The Little Country Doctor and Nurse Kit, inspired by Dr. Daniel Defoe.
10	George S. Parker (1866–1952)	Founder of Parker Brothers, created Rook and Pit, introduced jigsaw puzzles, Ping Pong and Monopoly is an industry phenomenon in itself.
Inducted, 1987
11	Walt Disney (1901–1966)	Walt Disney had a great affinity for toys, and happily, the industry's products depicting so many of his ingratiating characters are helping to communicate that joy and happiness.
12	Joshua Lionel Cowen (1877–1965)	Lionel replicas that paralleled the growth and development of U.S. railroads became the classic of toy trains and accessories; even the company's catalogs and its advertisements were classics - all mirroring the genius of Cowen.
Inducted, 1988
13	James J. Shea, Sr. (1889–1977)	His genius for solving complex problems yielded dramatic results for The Milton Bradley Company, which he headed for over thirty years, building it into a giant among manufacturers of games as well as other product categories.
14	Morey W. Kasch (1907–1972)	Founder of the M.W. Kasch Company.
15	Walter W. Armatys	Managed the Toy Fair in New York for many years, was instrumental in setting up the TMA safety and logistics seminars, and handled organization of the Toy Industry Hall of Fame.
Inducted, 1989
16	Benjamin F. Michtom (1901–1980)	Possibly the best promoter of toys ever, he structured a sales and marketing organization second to none, propelling the Ideal Toy Company to the forefront of the industry. One of the first to make use of licensed products; he inspired the rage for the Shirley Temple doll.
17	Ruth (1916-2002) and Elliot Handler (1916-2011)	The first toy company to advertise on television, they bought time on the "Mickey Mouse Show" and changed product marketing forever. The resulting visibility meant that for millions of children a Mattel toy defined being a youngster in the ‘50s and ‘60s. The introduction of Barbie in 1959 proved that the Handlers truly had their finger on the pulse of American society.
18	Ole Kirk Christiansen (1891–1958)	Founder of Lego.
Inducted, 1990
19	Edward P. Parker (1912–1974)	Chairman of Parker Brothers, vice president of General Mills and director and former president of Toy Manufacturers of America.
20	Charles Lazarus (1923-2018)	Founded Toys "R" Us and pioneered a new concept in the retailing of children’s toys that completely revolutionized how playthings are sold in the U.S. and many countries around the world.
Inducted, 1991
21	Stephen D. Hassenfeld (1942–1989)	Built Hasbro into the largest toy manufacturer in the world.
22	Henry H. Coords (1915–1995)	Enhanced the reputation of Fisher-Price for quality and play value and presided over its transformation into an industry giant.
Inducted, 1992
23	Bernard Loomis (1923–2006)	Introduced some of the world's most notable brands including "Chatty Cathy", "Barbie", "Hot Wheels", "Baby Alive", and "Strawberry Shortcake", but perhaps his biggest marketing success was bringing a then-unknown film property called Star Wars to the toy shelves. Every toy company he worked for (Mattel, General Mills, and Hasbro) became "the world's largest toy company" during his tenures in each company.
24	Jim Henson (1936–1990)	Creator of puppets - including Kermit the Frog, Big Bird, Miss Piggy, Bert and Ernie, Cookie Monster and Oscar the Grouch
Inducted, 1993
25	Albert Steiner (1895–1977)	Kenner created a business renowned for its toy versions of adult activities, including the Girder and Panel Building set, Give A Show Projector and Easy Bake Oven.
26	Aaron Locker (1927–2013)	As general counsel to TMA, his name became synonymous with product safety as he guided the Association through the perils of government regulation.
Inducted, 1994
27	Alan G. Hassenfeld (1948–2025)	As chairman and chief executive, he has diversified Hasbro’s portfolio of companies and expanded international operations while initiating a singular brand of corporate activism designed to improve the lives of children.
Inducted, 1995
28	John W. Amerman (1932–)	By focusing on building core products, cutting costs and reorganizing management, at Mattel he engineered a comprehensive program that turned the struggling company around in one year.
Inducted, 1996
29	Richard E. Grey (1934–)	He led Tyco through product development, acquisitions and aggressive marketing until it became the third largest U.S. toymaker.
Inducted, 1997
30	Sy Ziv (1925-2011)	He assisted in the development of the Toys "R" Us concept and made contributions to nearly every facet of the promotional toy business. His guidance helped small companies stay in business and many manufacturers to achieve personal and corporate success.
31	Howard Moore (1930–)	As executive vice president and general merchandise manager at Toys "R" Us, his focus on strategic line planning, product selection and merchandising enabled toy companies to grow and flourish while contributing to the major retail success of Toys "R" Us.
32	Thomas J. Kalinske (1944–)	He was president of Mattel, Universal Matchbox and Sega of America. He helped Barbie and Hot Wheels grow into major international brands. He led Sega to market leadership and helped establishing an industry-wide video game rating system.
Inducted, 1998
33	Russell L. Wenkstern (1912–2000)	As president and CEO of Tonka Toys, he brought the company to worldwide prominence by 1974. He turned Tonka into the largest volume manufacturer of vehicles of any type in the world, and insisted that Tonka trucks be the safest and most durable toys of their time, a tradition that continues today.
34; 35; 36	Jeffrey Breslow (1943–); Howard Morrison (1932-); Rouben Terzian (1939-)	In 1967, when they joined the legendary Marvin Glass, they began a 31-year collaboration that has led to the creation and design of some of the industry's most successful toy and game products. In 1988, Breslow Morrison Terzian and Associates was formed to continue their tradition of excellence. Their best-selling products include: The Animal, Ants in the Pants, Guesstures, Brain Warp, California Roller Baby, Real Talking Bubba, Masterpiece, My Size Barbie, Casey Cartwheel, Jennie Gymnast, Hot Wheels Criss Cross Crash and many more.
Inducted, 1999
37	Michael Goldstein (1941–)	As leader of Toys "R" Us, he brought to the company innovative merchandising ideas, guiding its rise to the world's largest retailer of children's products.
Inducted, 2000
38	Fred Ertl, Jr. (1930–2017)	The Ertl Company created toy tractors. His leadership generated an industry-wide shift in the role of safety and toys, resulting in the development of the first toy safety standard.
39	Beatrice Alexander (1895–1990)	Founder of the Alexander Doll Company, she was the premier American doll maker of the 20th century.
Inducted, 2001
40	Betty James (1918–2008)	Produced the Slinky as president and CEO of James Industries.
Inducted, 2002
41	David A. Miller (1932–)	He pioneered national and global efforts to change international opinion in favor of accepting China into the World Trade Organization and win it permanent Most Favored Nation status in the U.S.
Inducted, 2003
42	Antonio Pasin (1896–1990)	By 1930, Pasin had adopted the mass production technologies of the auto industry to create the first affordable steel wagon, earning him the nickname "Little Ford". The invention of the radio and the wonder of flight inspired the wagon and company name Radio Flyer.
43	Eddy Goldfarb (1921-)	Over his long career in the toy industry, Eddy Goldfarb has put close to 800 items on the market in a variety of toy categories, and has received almost 300 patents. Some of his earliest and most successful toys have been: Yakkity Yak Teeth, Busy Biddy, Merry-Go-Sip, Shark Attack, Arcade Basketball, Quiz Way, Kerplunk, Baby Beans and Lego Creator Game, to name a few.
Inducted, 2004
44	Neil B. Friedman (1947-)	Currently (2004) president of Fisher-Price Brands, a wholly owned subsidiary of Mattel, Mr. Friedman is credited with continuing Fisher-Price's leadership as the premiere infant and preschool manufacturer and establishing Fisher-Price as a significant force in character branded toys.
45	George Ditomassi	President of the Milton Bradley Company and president of Hasbro.
46	Milton Bradley (1836–1911)	Founder of Milton Bradley and inventor of The Checkered Game of Life and the one-armed paper cutter.
Inducted, 2005
47	Lionel Weintraub (1920–1994)	Introduced the first three-dimensional games: "Mousetrap!", "Toss Across", "Rebound", "Kerplunk", "Magic 8 Ball" and "Rubik's Cube".
48	Reuben Klamer (1922-2021)	Best known as the originator and an inventor of The Game of Life, which became part of the permanent Archives of Family Life at the Smithsonian Institution in Washington, DC in 1981.
Inducted, 2006
49	Edwin Binney (1866–1934); C. Harold Smith (1860–1931)	Cousins founded Binney & Smith in 1885. In 1903, Binney & Smith introduced the first box of eight Crayola crayons, responding to teachers' need for safe and affordable wax crayons for their students.
Inducted, 2007
50	George Lucas (1944–)	Star Wars was the first entertainment franchise that brought together film, licensing and merchandising. Star Wars action figures established the 3¾-inch scale and spawned a community of passionate toy collectors setting the industry "standard" on which most major movie toy lines are based today.
Inducted, 2008
51	Kjeld Kirk Kristiansen (1947-)	President of the Lego Group.
Inducted, 2009
52	Joan Ganz Cooney (1929-)	Co-founder of the Children's Television Workshop, now known as Sesame Workshop.
53	Jack Pressman (1895-1959)	Founder of the Pressman Toy Corporation.
Inducted, 2010
54	John Lasseter (1957-)	Chief creative officer of Pixar and Walt Disney Animation Studios.
55	Sam Walton (1918-1992)	Founder of retailer Wal-Mart.
Inducted, 2011
56	Donald F. Duncan, Sr. (1892-1971)	Founder of the Duncan Toys Company.
57	Al Verrecchia (1943-)	CEO of Hasbro.
Inducted, 2012
58	Frederick August Otto Schwarz (1836-1911)	Founder of toy retailer FAO Schwarz.
59	Arnie Rubin	Founder of Funrise Toy Corporation.
Inducted, 2013
60	Russell Berrie (1933-2002)	Founder of toy maker Russ Berrie & Company.
61	Judy Ellis	Founder of the nation's first baccalaureate program in Toy Design, which she launched at the Fashion Institute of Technology in 1989.
Inducted, 2014
62	Arthur "Spud" Melin (1924-2002) and Richard Knerr (1925-2008)	Founders of toy maker Wham-O.
63	Jack Friedman (1939-2010)	Founder of three toy companies: LJN Toys, THQ, and Jakks Pacific.
64	Horst Brandstätter (1933-2015)	Owner and president of Brandstätter Group, which includes toy company Playmobil.
65	Jill Barad (1951-)	CEO of Mattel.
Inducted, 2015
66	Leslie Berger (1919-2014)	Founder of toy maker Cardinal Industries.
67	Pat Feely	Toy industry executive at Tonka and Radica Games.
Inducted, 2016
68	Bob Iger (1951-)	Chairman and chief executive officer of The Walt Disney Company.
Inducted, 2017
69	Peter Eio	Former president of The Lego Group
70	Ray Larsen (1939–2012)	Founder of RLA Marketing
71	Sydney Rosen (1917–2011)	Former owner of Rose Art
Inducted, 2018
72	Andrea Barthello	CEO OF ThinkFun
73	James Becker (1921-2011)	Founder of Anjar Co.
Inducted, 2019
74	Brian Goldner (1963-2021)	CEO OF Hasbro
75	Joe Mendelsohn (1930-2017)	Former president of Kenner Products
76	Stan Lee (1922-2018)	Former chairman of Marvel Comics
Inducted, 2020
77	Harry Kislevitz (1927-2009)	Founder of Colorforms Corporation
78	Thomas G. Murdough, Jr.	Founder Little Tikes/Step 2/Simplay 3
79	Thomas Chan	Founder and CEO of Playmates Toys Inc
Inducted, 2021
80	Margarete Steiff (1847-1909)	Founder and Creator of Steiff
81	Pleasant Rowland (1941-)	Founder of American Girl
82	William C. Killgallon	Chairman of the Board, The Ohio Art Company
83	Philip Bloom	Founder & Former Publisher, The Bloom Report
Inducted, 2022
84	Lucille King	Founder of Playskool Institute
85	Johnny Gruelle (1880-1938)	Creator of Raggedy Ann & Raggedy Andy
86	Bob Wann	PlayMonster
87	Jim Pressman	Pressman Toy Corporation
Inducted, 2023
88	John Lloyd Wright (1892-1972)	Inventor of Lincoln Logs
89	David W. Ring	Founder of Larami Corporation
90	Rose O'Neill (1874-1944)	Inventor of Kewpie Dolls
91	John McLoughlin Jr. (1827-1905)	Founder of McLoughlin Brothers
92	Mary Couzin	Founder & President ChiTag & People of Play
93; 94; 95	Ronnen Harary (1971-); Anton Rabie; Ben Varadi	Co-Founders of Spin Master
Inducted, 2025
96	Maxine Clark	Founder & former Chief Executive Bear of Build-A-Bear Workshop
97	Sharon DiMinico	Founder & Chair of Learning Express Toys
98	Ernő Rubik	Inventor of Rubik's Cube
99	Edwin S. Lowe (1910-1986)	Founder of ES Lowe and Company
100	Charles Pajeau (1875-1952)	Founder of Toy Tinker Company; Inventor of Tinkertoy
101	Marty Scheman (1932-2007)	President of Tyco-Preschool
102	Izannah Walker (1817-1888)	American dollmaker & Inventor
Inducted, 2026
103	Melissa and Doug Bernstein	Founders of Melissa & Doug
104	Isaac Larian	Founder & CEO of MGA Entertainment
105	Stanley Weston	Inventor of G.I. Joe Action Figure; Founder of Leisure Concepts

== See also ==
- National Toy Hall of Fame
- List of toys and children's media awards
