= Toy wagon =

Small four-wheeled cart for play

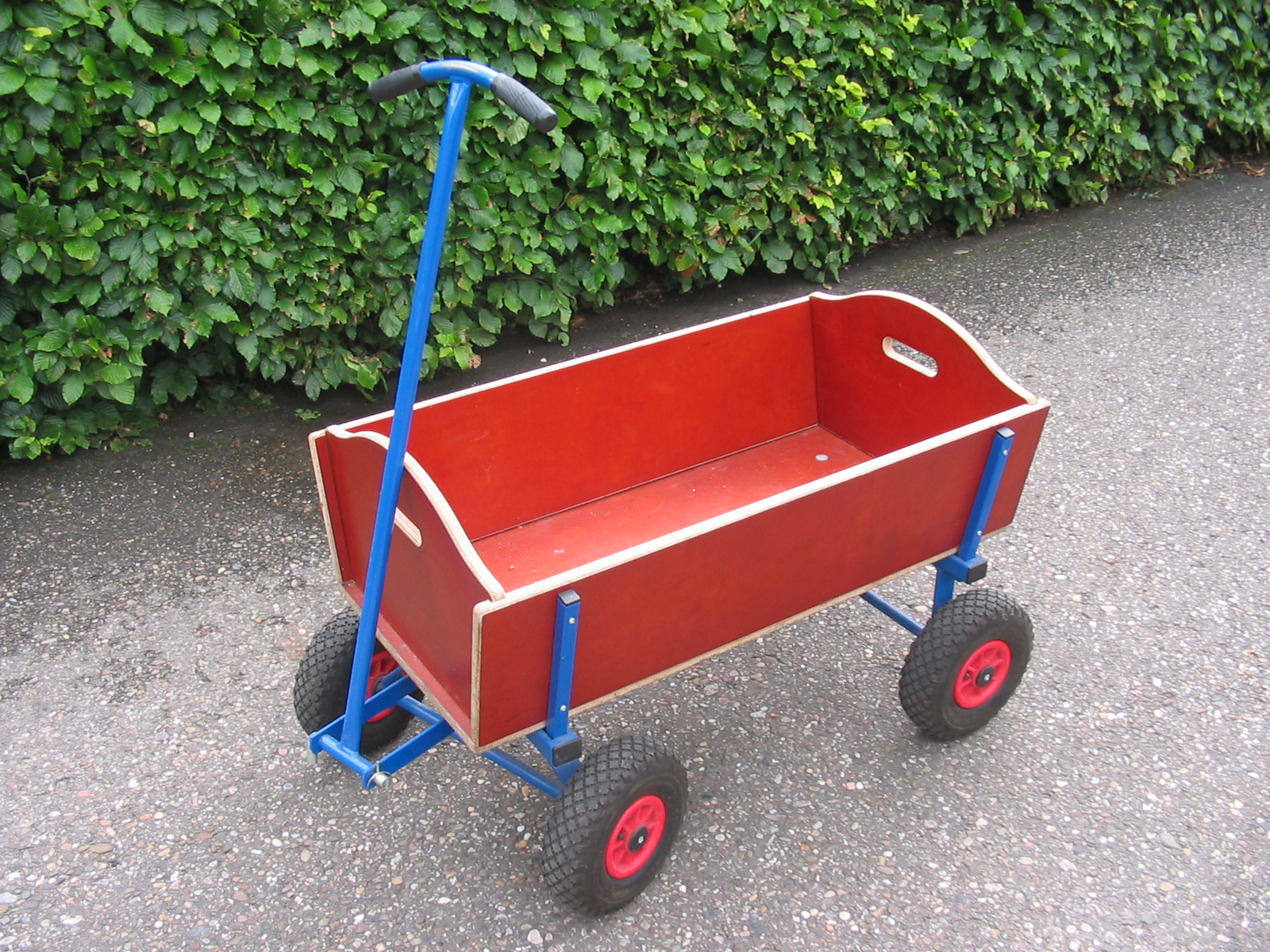
A T-handled child's wagon in the Netherlands.

A toy wagon has the same structure as the traditional, larger wagon, but is much smaller and has an open top. An average wagon is able to seat one child, and is generally propelled by human power through a handle at the front. Some famous brands are Radio Flyer, Little Tikes, Red Rider, Northern Tool and Equipment, Lowe's, Cardinal, and Speedway Express.

== History ==
Stereo image
Left frame
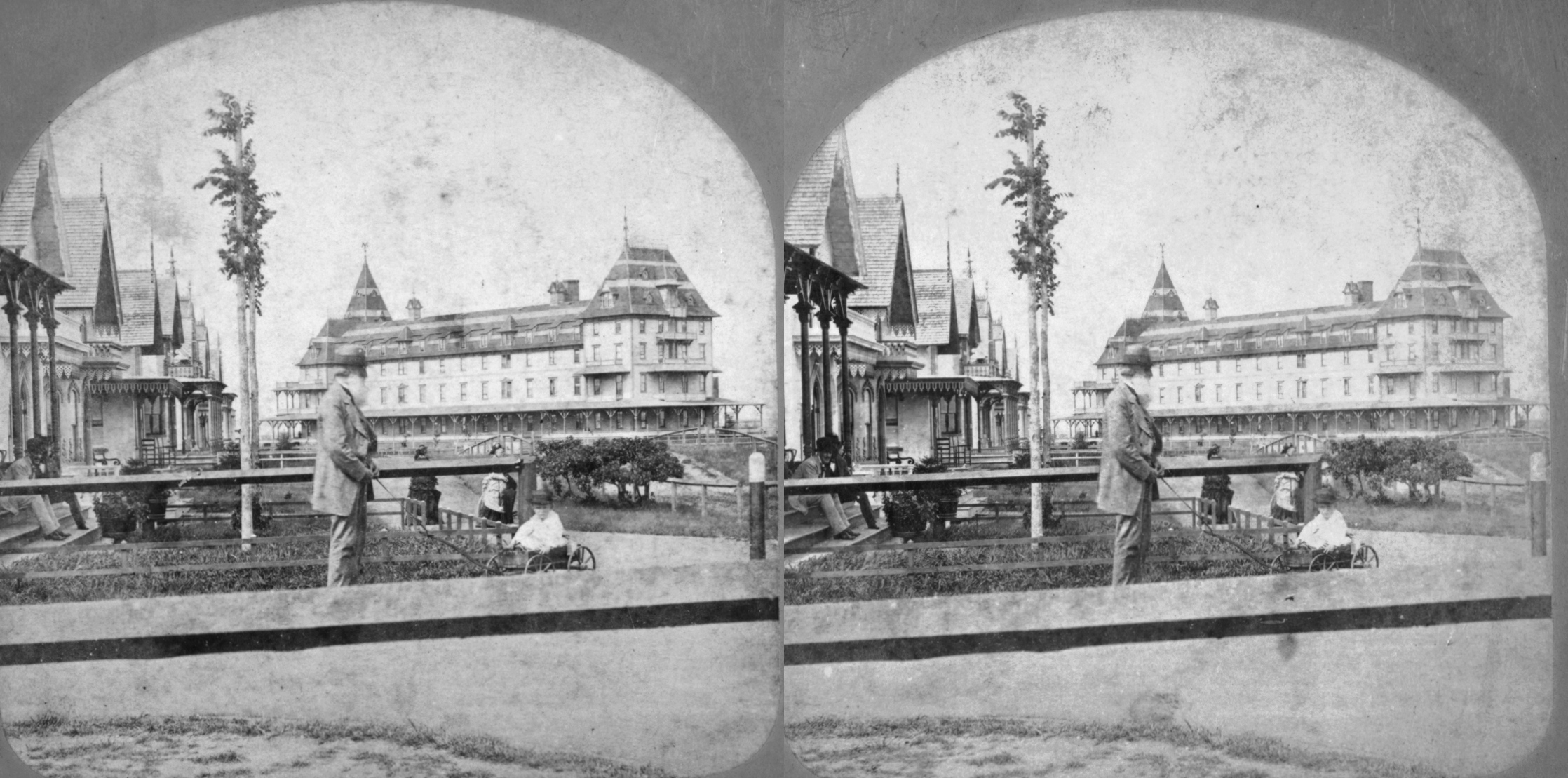
Right frame
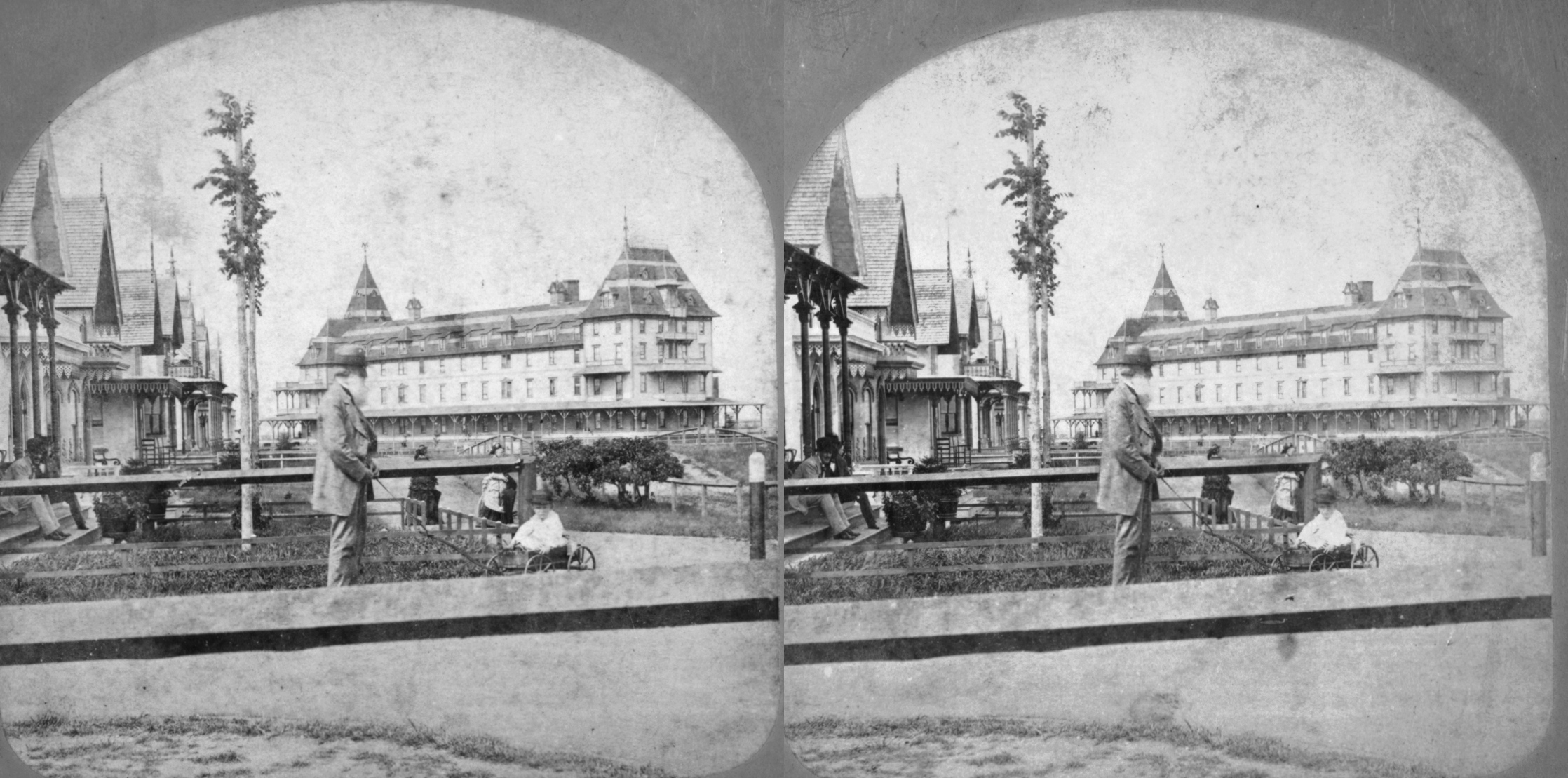
Parallel view
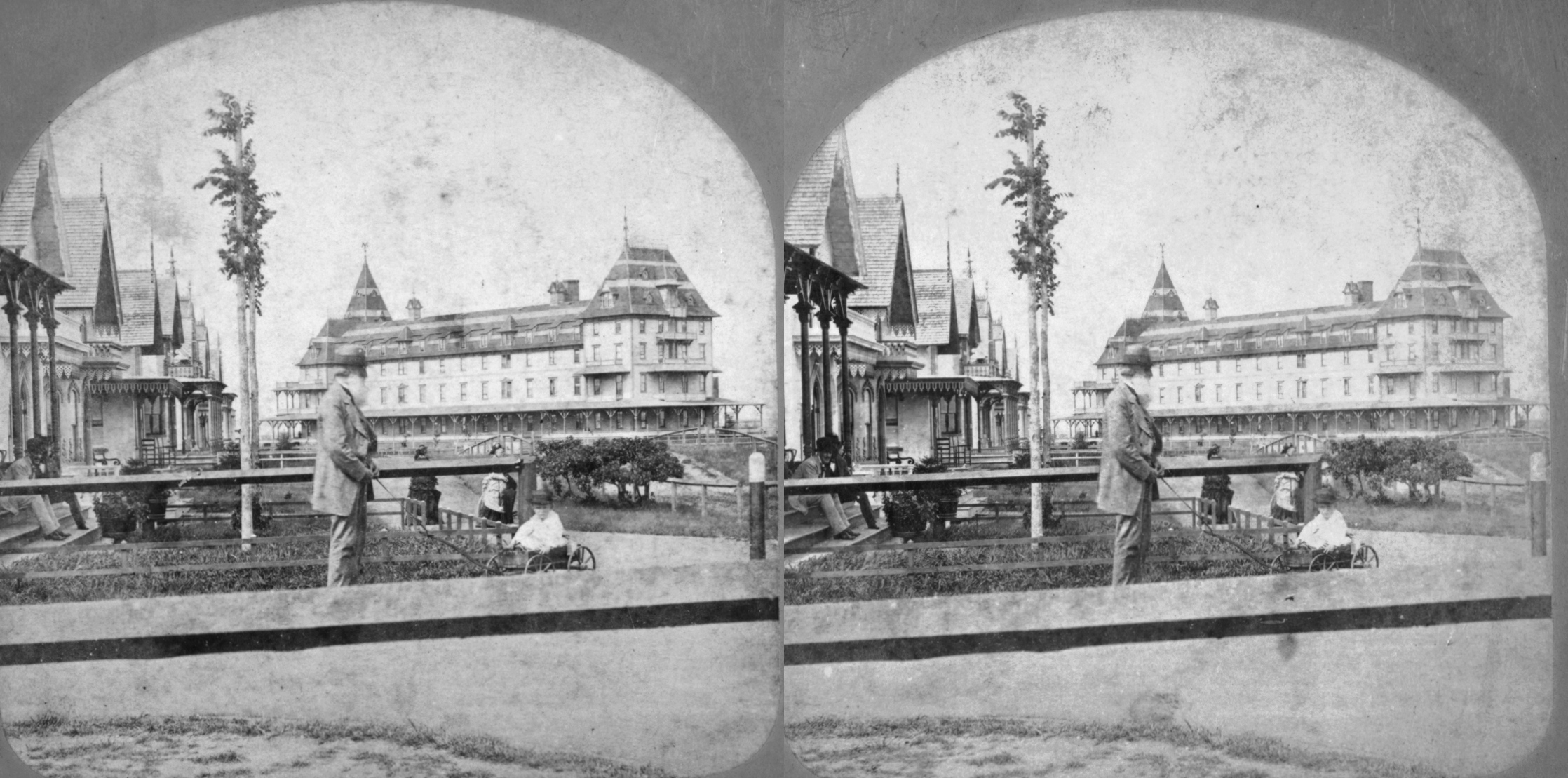
Cross-eye view
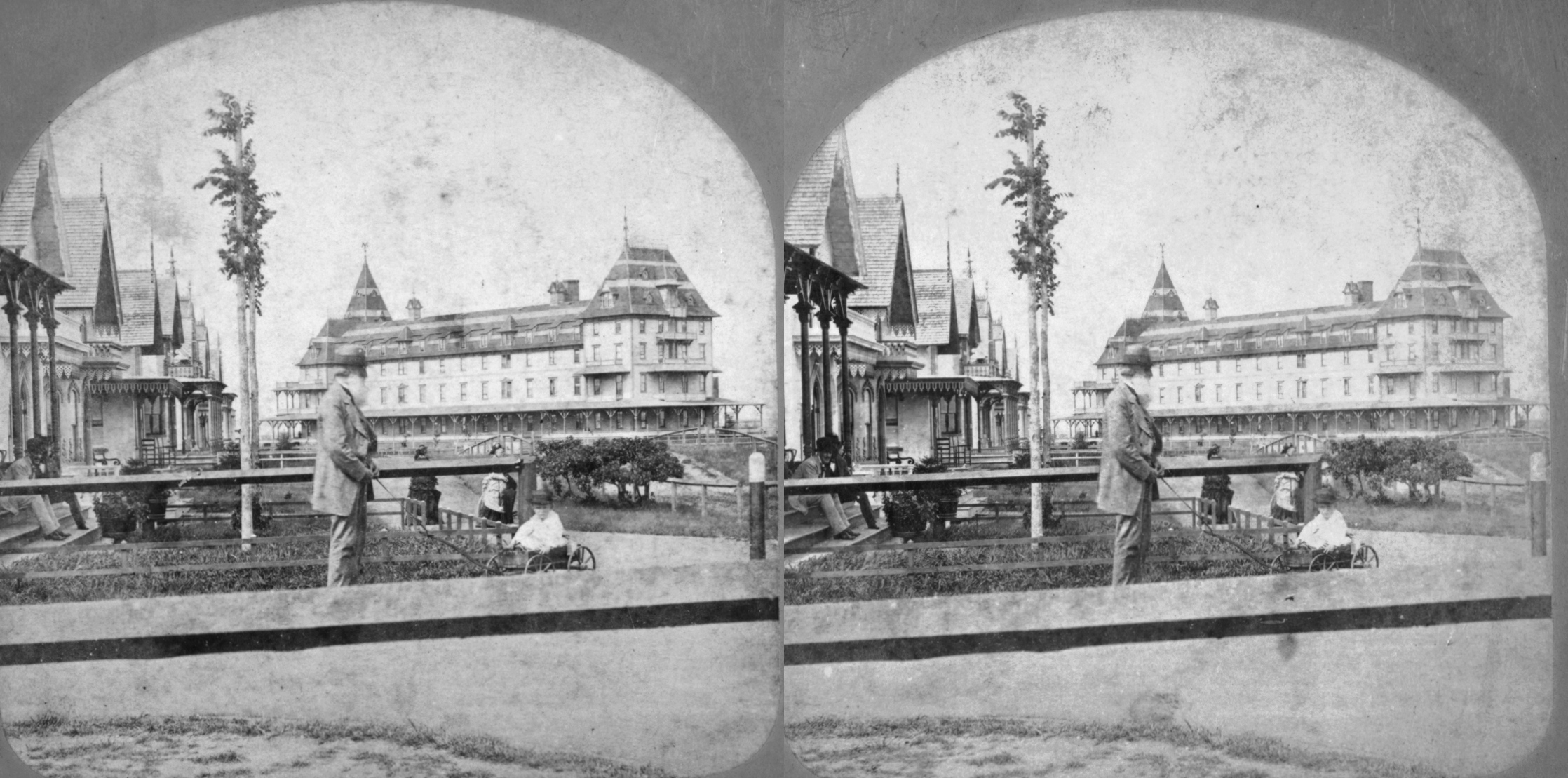

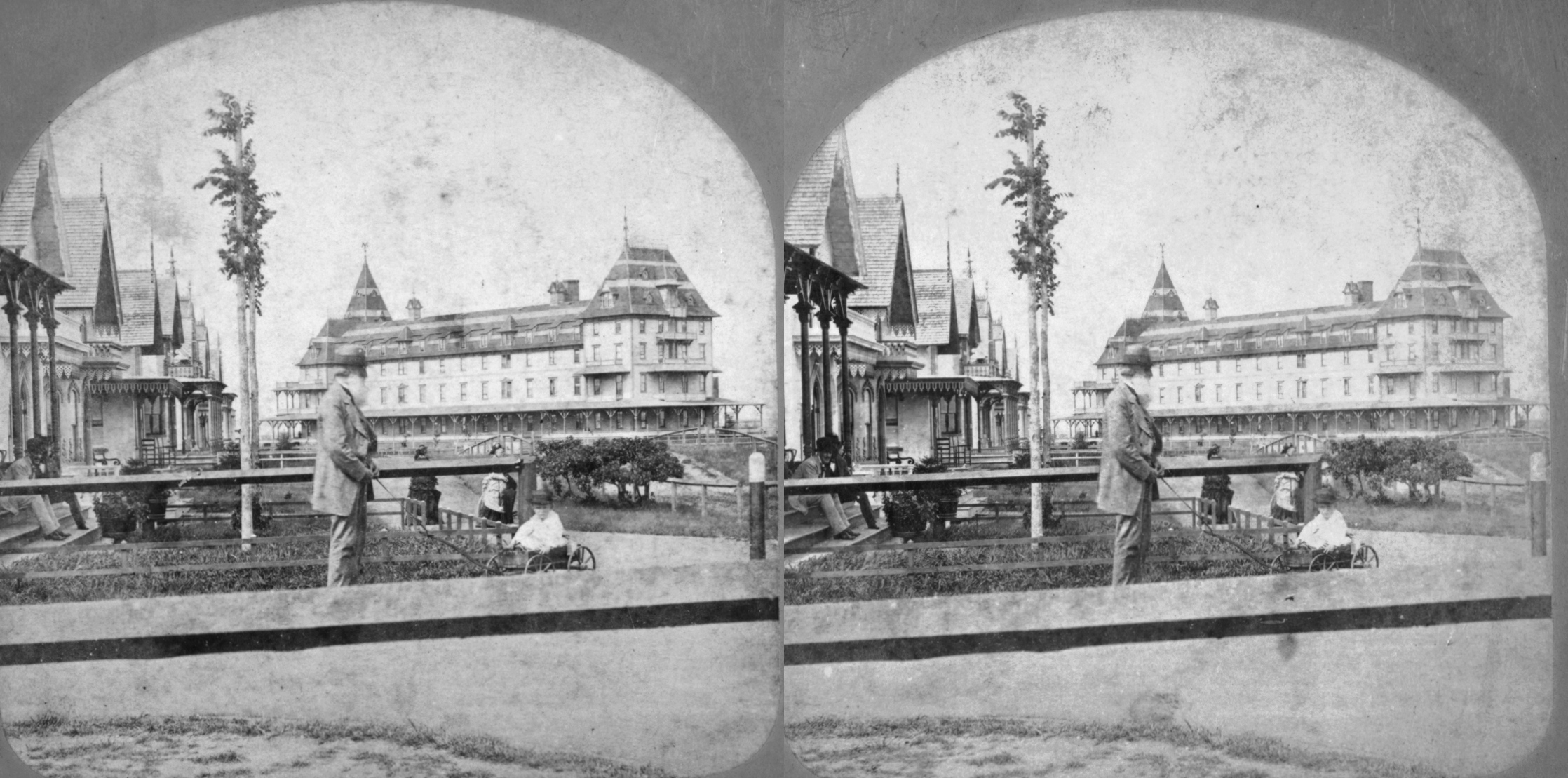
- Nineteenth century child's wagon

Toy wagons have been around since the late 19th century, and are traditionally painted red. They were originally made of wood. Antonio Pasin started making wagons in 1917 and eventually started the Radio Flyer company. He produced many of them in his workshop in Chicago and they became a national hit after the 1933 Chicago World Fair. His toy wagons helped bring people back from the thoughts of the looming war to their simple pleasures.

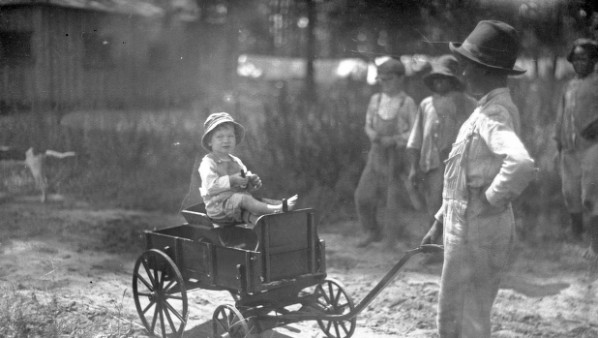
Boy in a wagon

== Design ==
The basic design of toy wagons has been the same since the late 19th century. Usually, a small wagon contains 9, 12, or 16 bolts. The back axle usually contains 4 bolts, and the front varies among the different steering designs. The wheels can be air tires, hard rubber tires, or hard plastic tires. Some small kids' wagons are made completely out of plastic. Some are made of wood, aluminum, poly, or steel. The shape of the handle also can be different, some shaped like a T, others like a D, and some with a circle handhold at the end. The main problem with wagons is rust. Wagons are usually painted in outdoor paint to prevent rusting, but all metal wagons will eventually get slightly battered and can then rust.

== Uses ==
=== Utility wagons ===
People also use toy wagons for small, outdoor projects. Companies such as Northern Tool, Lowe's, and Tractor Supply Company make wagons specifically for outdoor work. Usually they are painted a different color than red and are made of metal. They are also usually larger and more expensive. Wagons can be useful for moving dirt, wood chips, mulch, or gravel. They can also be used in gardening for moving plants. Nursery wagons are available just for professional gardening. Nursery wagons let dirt and water go through the bottom and are good for plants and pots in a greenhouse. They can also be used for moving camping gear or boxes. Some utility wagons are self-propelled by small motors so that the user can handle heavier loads on rough, uneven terrain. These wagons are often equipped with a tilting cargo bed which allows the user to dump their cargo more easily, making them suitable for small farms. Some companies, such as Speedway Express, make huge 8-wheeled wagons that are made of wood.

=== Family wagons ===
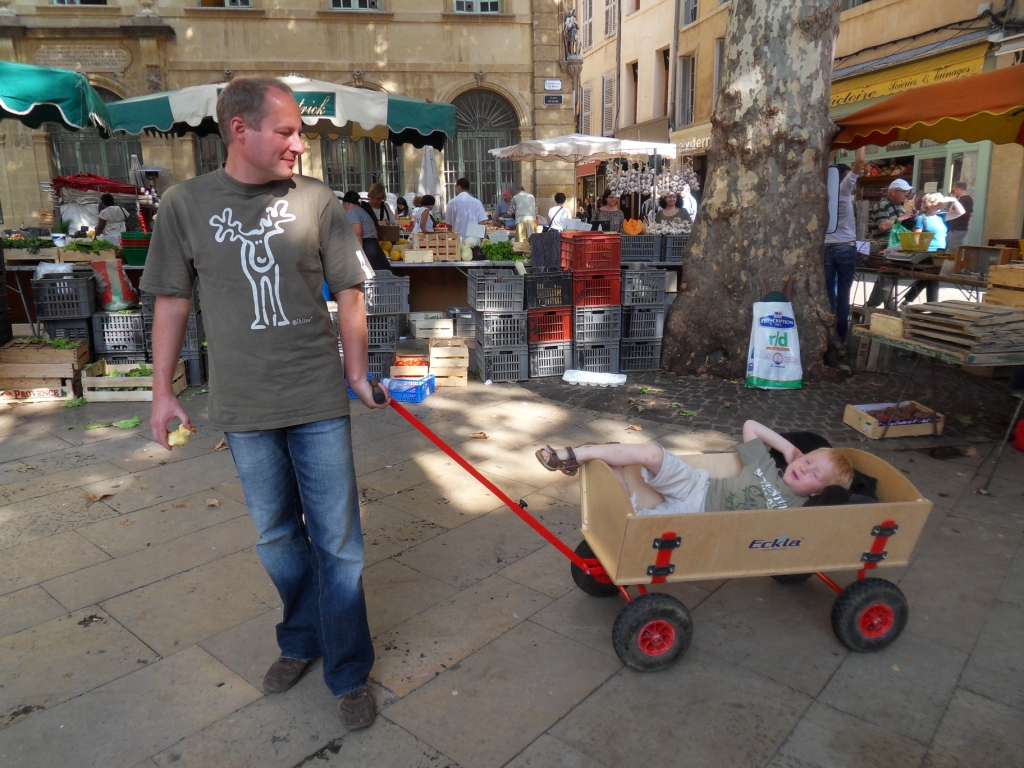
A toy wagon used to transport a child on holiday in Aix-en-Provence, France.

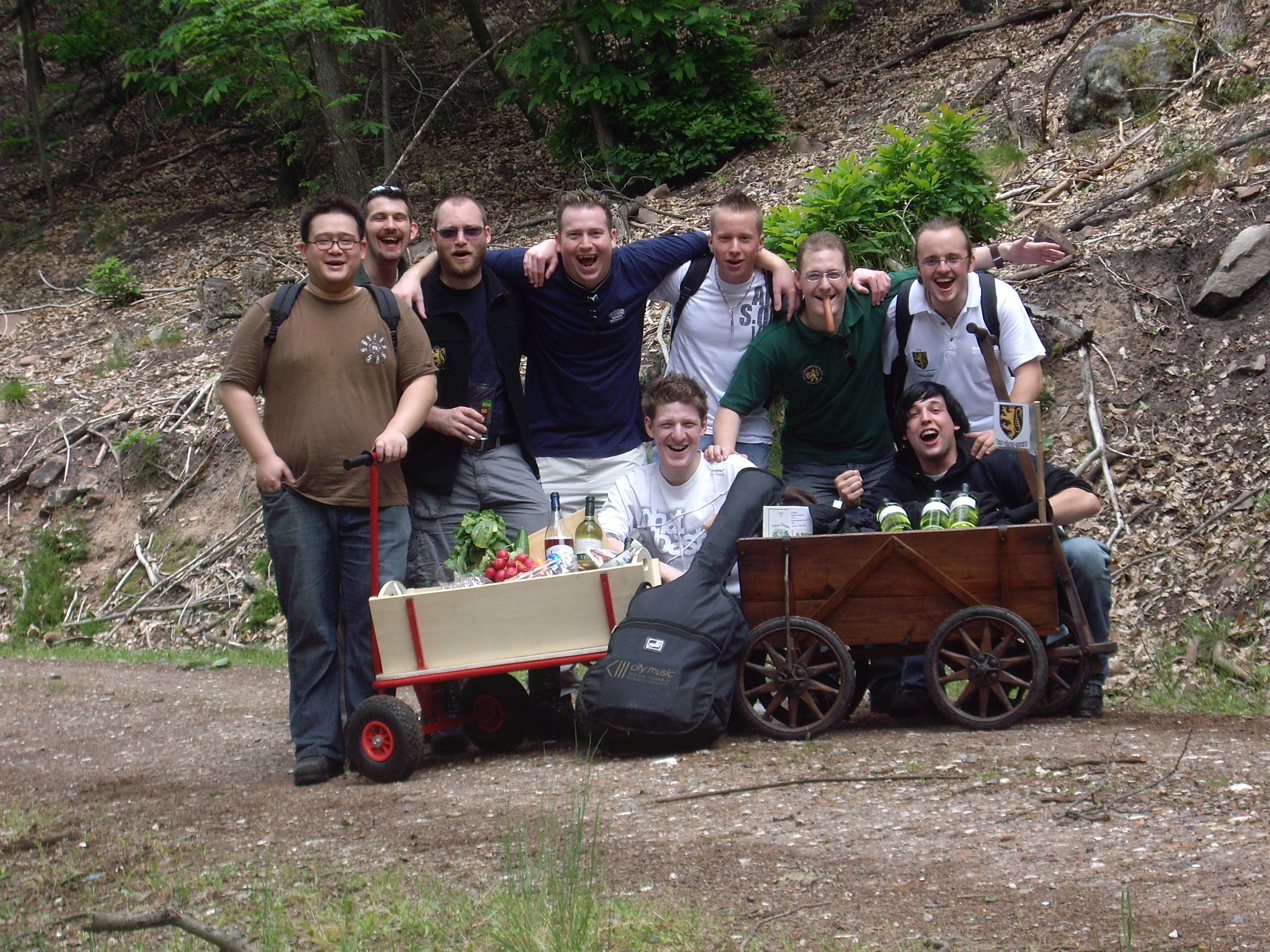
A traditional German Father's Day excursion with wagons.

In some countries, wagons are popular ways to transport children around outside events. These trolleys are often large enough to fit multiple children, and usually made of fabric with metal frames that fold to fit inside a vehicle. In the United Kingdom, festival wagons allow parents to take children around music festivals comfortably, often with protection from sun and rain. In Germany, families often use wagons for picnics and beach holidays, and traditionally on Father's Day (Ascension Day) German men use small wagons to carry food and alcohol on a group excursion – specially designed toy wagons with built-in barbecues or beer tables have been produced for this market.

== Monuments ==
In 1997, Radio Flyer made a huge wagon 27 feet (8.2 m) long and 13 feet (4.0 m) wide to celebrate the 80th anniversary of Radio Flyer. The wagon weighs 15,000 pounds and is constructed of steel.

== See also ==
- Baggage cart
- Dolly (trailer)
- Flatbed trolley
- Front axle assembly
- Pallet jack
- Shopping cart
