= New Rochelle Walk of Fame =

Coordinates: 40°54′37″N 73°46′59″W

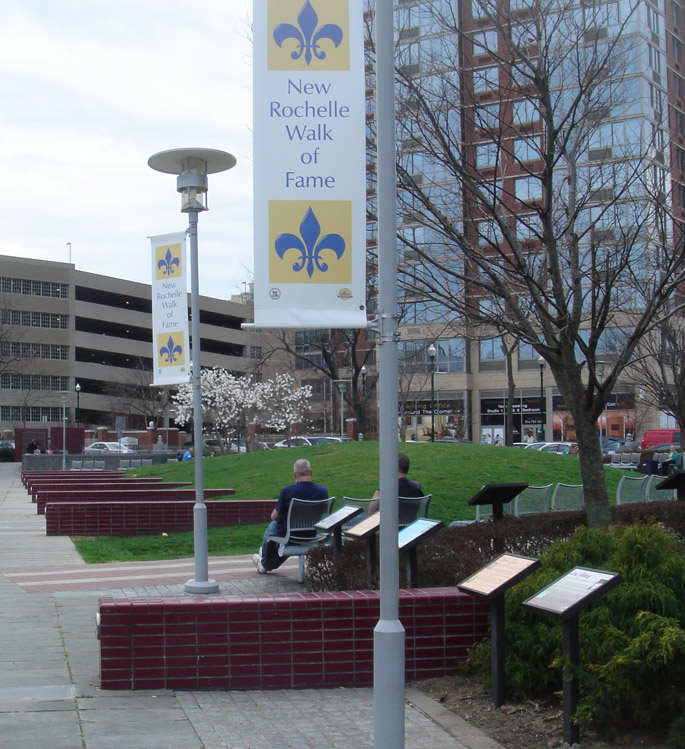
The New Rochelle Walk of Fame

The New Rochelle Walk of Fame was installed in 2011 in Ruby Dee Park at Library Green, located in the downtown area of New Rochelle in Westchester County, New York. The "walk" is a tribute to some of New Rochelle's most notable residents from throughout its 325-year history. It was created and funded by former resident Roderick Kennedy, Jr., working in partnership with the City of New Rochelle and the New Rochelle Business Improvement District.

== Inductees ==
The following is the list of the individuals recognized in New Rochelle's "Walk of Fame."

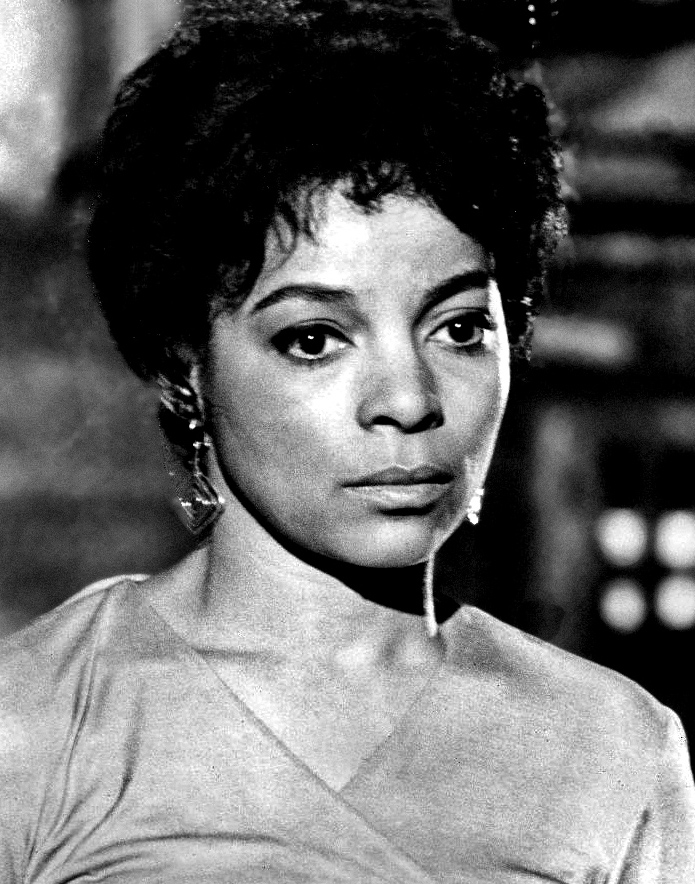
Ruby Dee

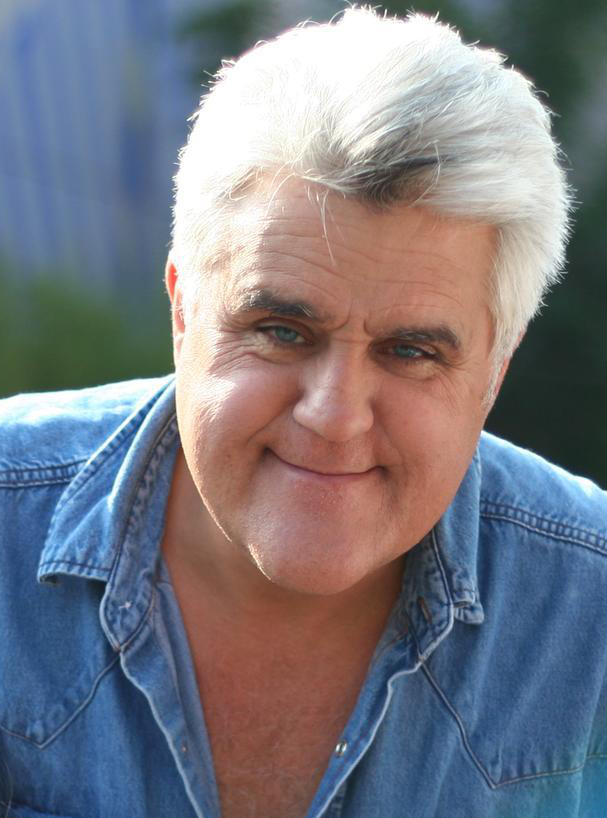
Jay Leno

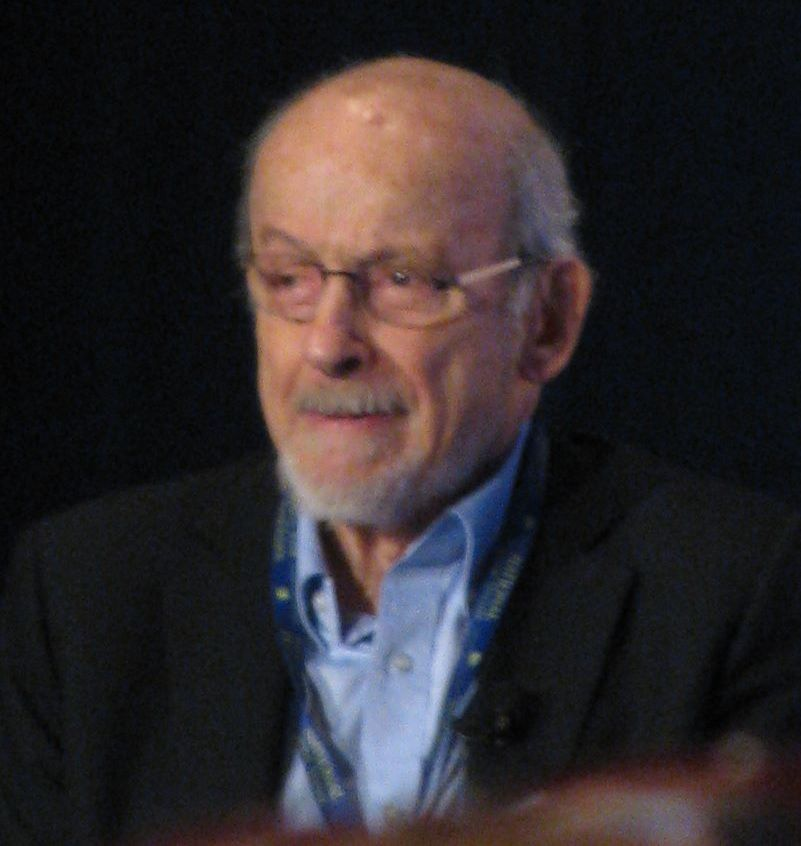
E.L. Doctorow

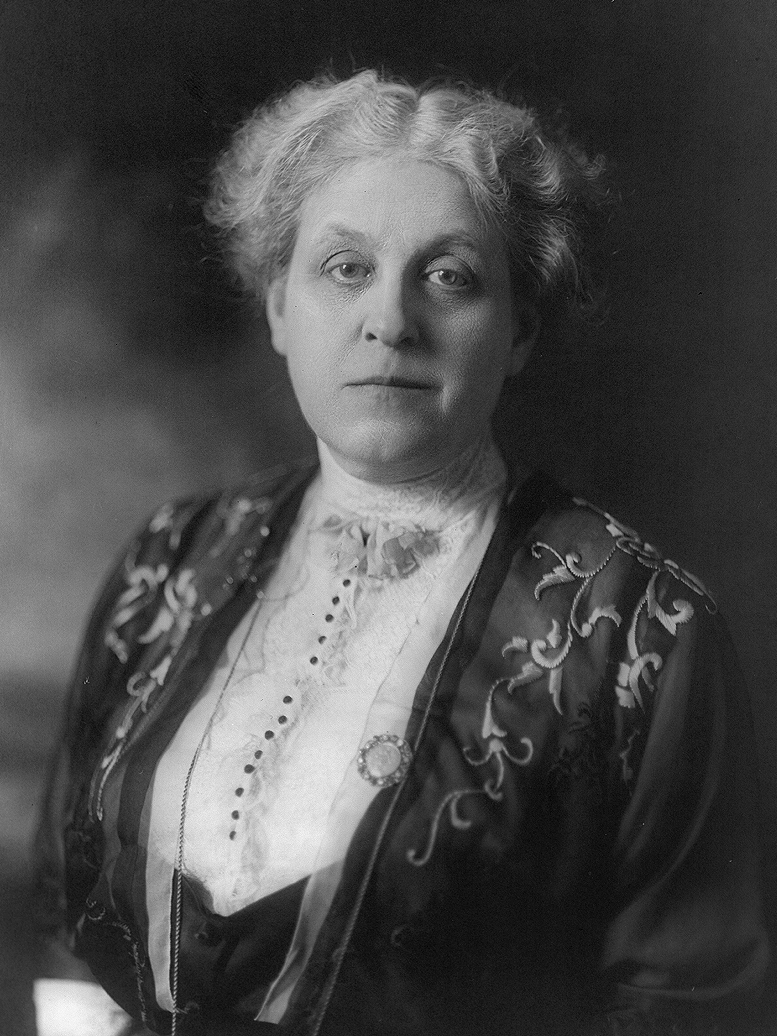
Carrie Chapman Catt

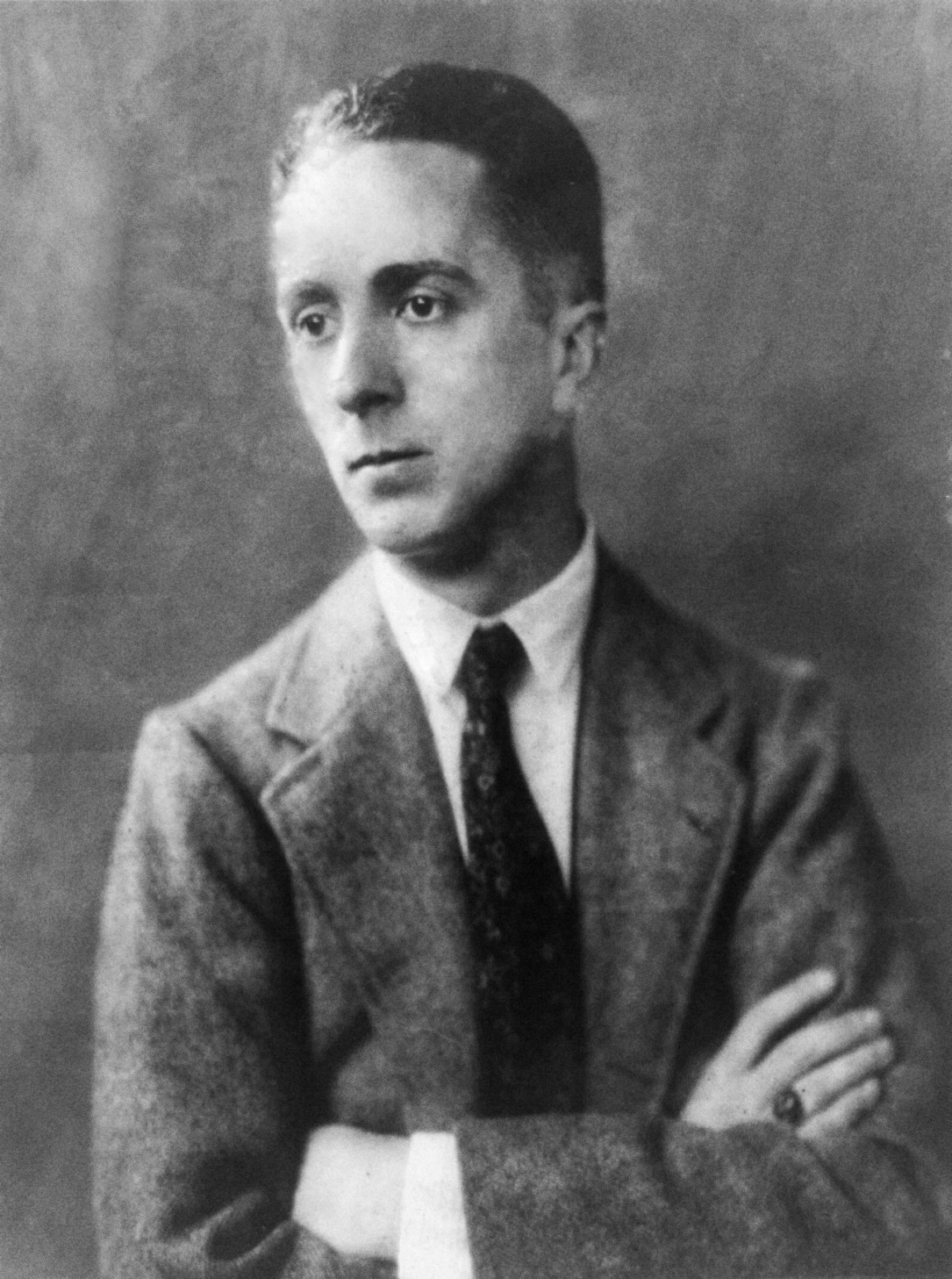
Norman Rockwell

- Beatrice Alexander (1895–1990): Premier doll maker of the 20th century
- Robert Allen (1928–2000): Music Composer; There's no Place Like Home for the Holidays
- Jerry Bock (1928–2010): Musical theater composer; Fiddler on the Roof
- Theresa Brewer (1932–2007): Singer and entertainer
- Nell Brinkley (1886–1944): Illustrator, cartoonist; the "Queen of Comics"
- Joseph Campbell (1904–1987): Writer, mythologist; The Hero with a Thousand Faces
- Irene Castle (1893–1969): Dancer and trend-setter (with Vernon Castle)
- Carrie Chapman Catt (1859–1947): A leader of the women's suffrage movement
- J. Fred Coots (1897–1985): Songwriter; Santa Claus is Coming to Town
- Richard Courant (1888–1972): Mathematician; co-founder of the Courant Institute
- Ellabelle Davis (1907–1960): Opera singer
- Ossie Davis (1917–2005): Actor, author and activist
- Ruby Dee (1924–2014): Actress, author and activist
- E. L. Doctorow (1931–2015): Novelist, editor, professor; Ragtime
- Eddie Foy (1856–1928): Vaudeville performer; Eddie Foy and The Seven Little Foys
- Kurt Friedrichs (1901–1982): Mathematician; co-founder of the Courant Institute
- Lou Gehrig (1903–1941): New York Yankee baseball player and first baseman
- Dorothy Gish (1989–1968): Screen and stage actress
- Lillian Gish (1893–1993): Screen and stage actress, director
- Barry Gray (1916–1996): Radio personality; "The Father of Talk Radio"
- Monty Hall (born 1921): Game show host; Let's Make a Deal
- Henry J. Heimlich (1920–2016): Physician and developer of the "Heimlich Maneuver"
- Don Hewitt (1922–2009): Television news producer; created 60 Minutes
- Adrian G Iselin (1818–1905): Financier and philanthropist
- Elia Kazan (1909–2003): Director, producer, writer and actor
- Walter Lantz (1899–1994): Cartoonist, film animator; created Woody Woodpecker
- Jay Leno (born 1950): Comedian; hosted The Tonight Show
- Joseph Leyendecker (1874–1951): Artist and illustrator
- Reginald Marsh (1898–1954): Artist; known for his social realist paintings of New York City life
- Willie Mays (born 1931): NY and San Francisco Giants center fielder
- Don McLean (born 1946): Singer-songwriter, writer of "American Pie"
- Alan Menken (born 1949): Disney film score and musical theater composer
- Robert Merrill (1917–2004): Opera singer
- Thomas Paine (1737–1809): Writer, revolutionary, philosopher; American Founding Father
- Frederick Douglass Patterson (1901–1988): Educator: founded the United Negro College Fund
- Jan Peerce (1904–1984): Opera singer
- Pearl Primus (1919–1994): Dancer and choreographer
- Alex Raymond (1909–1956): Comic strip artist; created Flash Gordon
- Carl Reiner (born 1922): Comedian, actor, writer and director; The Dick Van Dyke Show
- Rob Reiner (born 1947): Actor, writer, director, producer; All in the Family
- Frederic Remington (1861–1909): Artist of the American West
- Mariano Rivera (born 1969): New York Yankees baseball pitcher
- Norman Rockwell (1894–1978): Artist and illustrator
- Richard Roundtree (born 1942): Actor; Shaft
- Elizabeth Ann Bayley Seton (1774–1821): The first American-born woman to become a saint
- Robert E. Sherwood (1896–1955): Playwright, editor, screenwriter; The Best Years of Our Lives
- Buffalo Bob Smith (1917–1998): Radio and TV personality; hosted the Howdy Doody Show
- John Starin (1825–1909): Congressman, shipping magnet; created Glen Island Park
- Joseph Stein (1912–2010): Playwright; Fiddler on the Roof
- John Stephenson (1809–1893): Coachbuilder; invented the streetcar
- Frances Sternhagen (born 1930): Stage, television and screen actress
- Paul Terry (1887–1971): Cartoonist, founded Terrytoons; created Mighty Mouse
- Edwin Thanhouser (1865–1956): Film producer; co-founded Thanhouser Films
- Gertrude Thanhouser (1882–1951): Actress, studio executive; co-founded Thanhouser Films
- Claire Trevor (1910–2000): Actress; "The Queen of Film Noir"
- Whitney M. Young, Jr. (1921–1971): Educator, Civil Rights leader; founded the Urban League

New Rochelle in the NFL

- Courtney Greene (born 1986): Safety; Seattle Seahawks and Jacksonville Jaguars
- Fritz Pollard (1894–1986): First African-American head coach and player in NFL
- Ray Rice (born 1987): Running Back; Baltimore Ravens
- Kyle Rote (1928–2002): Halfback and wide receiver; New York Giants
- Matt Snell (born 1941): Running back; New York Jets
- George Starke (born 1948): Offensive Lineman; Washington Redskins
- Fran Tarkenton (born 1940): Quarterback; Minnesota Vikings and New York Giants
