= Dollie & Me =

Fashion and toy brand

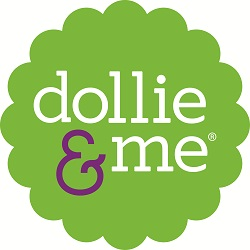
- Type: Subsidiary
- Industry: Apparel
- Founded: 2009
- Headquarters: New York, USA
- Products: Clothing; Accessories; Dolls; Toys
- Parent: Kahn Lucas Lancaster, Inc.

Dollie & Me is a girls lifestyle fashion and toy brand encompassing apparel sets that include a matching outfit for any 18 inch doll, their own line of dolls, and related accessories and toys. The line is sold through brick-and-mortar and online retailers including dollieme.com, Amazon.com, Zulily.com, and Kohl's, as well as two Dollie & Me stores in Pennsylvania. Dollieme.com was launched as an e-commerce website in 2013.

The brand's apparel ranges from size 2T to 20, and the matching apparel fits not only the Dollie & Me dolls, but most other 18 inch play dolls.

== Products ==
Dollie & Me began as a girls fashion and apparel line, offering an innovative product line of apparel sets that include a matching outfit for girls and their 18-inch dolls. In 2009, Dollie & Me partnered with Madame Alexander to produce their own 18-inch dolls, collectively called "Dollies", which are age-graded for children 3+ years, making them safe for even younger children than many other dolls of this kind. The following year, matching accessories and bags were introduced. The line expanded in 2013 to include bedding sets, furniture, and doll outfits and accessories sold separately from the apparel sets. New products in 2014 included Dressy Greetings™ (a unique greeting card and gift combination that include an outfit for an 18-inch doll), the introduction of Mommie & Me™ (apparel sets that include outfits for adults, child and doll), and aprons.

The complete Dollie & Me product line consists of dressy and casual dresses, legging sets, skirt sets, pajamas, nightgowns, dress-up, dance wear, aprons, Dressy Greetings, doll furniture including a 6-foot tall dollhouse, doll outfits and accessories, and 18 inch dolls.

== Awards ==
In 2010, Dollie & Me won the Platinum Oppenheim Toy Portfolio Award. In association with the award, their products were featured on The Today Show and appeared on the Times Square Reuters Billboard and in the Las Vegas Fashion Show Mall.

A 2010 article in Earnshaw's detailed Dollie & Me's matching products and line of expansion into toys, play sets, jewelry and other accessories. Later that year, a Fortune article wrote about Dollie & Me as a business and how it has become a competitor in the doll market in a short period of time. The Wall Street Journal highlighted Dollie & Me in an article about the competition in the 18-inch doll market.

Dollie & Me is also listed on several website's 2010 Holiday Gift Lists including Savvy Auntie, Nickelodeon's ParentsConnect and Big City Moms.
