= Radio Flyer =

American toy company

- Type: Private
- Industry: Toy industry
- Predecessor: Radio Steel & Manufacturing
- Founded: 1917; 109 years ago in Chicago
- Founder: Antonio Pasin
- Headquarters: Chicago, Illinois, United States
- Area served: Worldwide
- Website: www.radioflyer.com

Radio Flyer is an American toy company best known for its popular red toy wagon. Radio Flyer also produces scooters, tricycles, bicycles, horses, and ride-ons. The company was founded in 1917 and is based in Chicago, Illinois.

== History ==
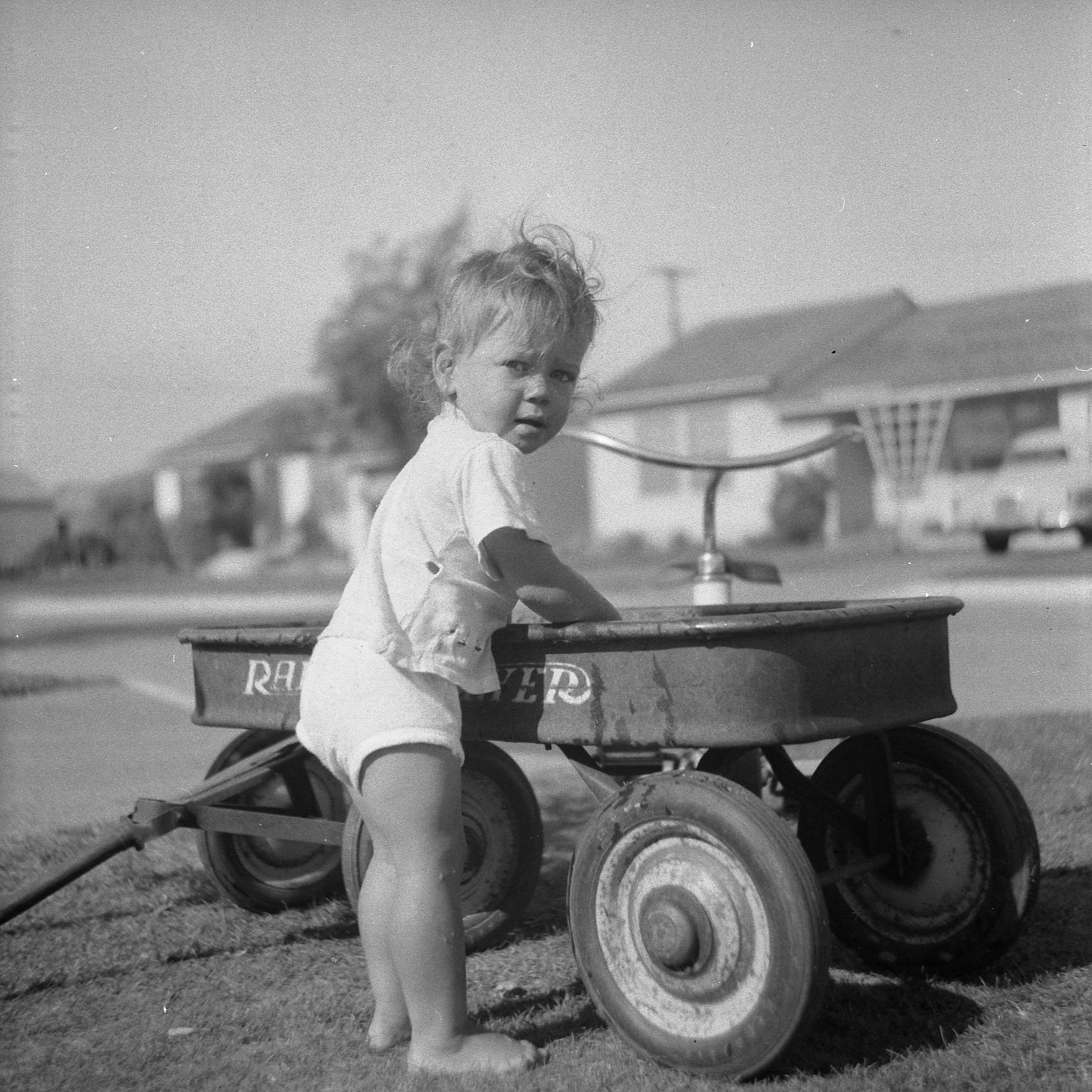
Young girl with Radio Flyer wagon circa 1955

Antonio Pasin immigrated to the United States from Italy in 1914 when he was 16 years old. He started building wooden toy wagons in Chicago in 1917, selling them to area shops. He was working as a craftsman at the time, mostly selling phonograph cabinets, and built small wooden wagons to carry around his tools. After he received numerous requests from customers of phonograph cabinets to buy the wagons as well, he refocused his business on the wagons. His business grew until the Liberty Coaster Company, named in honour of New York City's Statue of Liberty, was formed in 1923. The demands for these original wooden wagons, dubbed the "Liberty Coaster," quickly outpaced production. Incorporating the mass manufacturing techniques of the auto industry, Pasin began making metal wagons out of stamped steel in 1927. At around that time, the red wagons sold for slightly less than $3, or about $40 in 2016 dollars.

In 1930, the company was renamed Radio Steel & Manufacturing. The renamed company produced steel-bodied wagons and used assembly line manufacturing techniques. The new Radio Flyer wagons were named as a tribute to two famous men of the day: Marconi and Lindbergh. Italian inventor and engineer Guglielmo Marconi developed, demonstrated, and marketed the first successful long-distance wireless telegraph and in 1901 broadcast the first transatlantic radio signal. Charles Lindbergh completed the first solo, non-stop flight across the Atlantic in 1927. Combining those two marvels, Pasin christened his new metal wagons "Radio Flyer".

In 1933, Pasin set up a large manufacturing facility on Grand Avenue in the Belmont Cragin neighborhood. That year, Chicago was the host of the World's Fair, Century of Progress, and Radio Steel was asked to be a part of the celebration. Antonio Pasin took on major debt to fund the construction of a 45-foot (14 m) tall wood and plaster Coaster Boy statue depicting a boy riding a Liberty Coaster wagon. Below the Coaster Boy exhibit Pasin sold miniatures for 25 cents. During World War II, steel was essential war material; from 1942–1945, the company shifted production to portable five gallon Blitz cans for the US Army.

In 1987, Radio Steel changed its name to Radio Flyer after its popular flagship little red wagon. Pasin died in 1990, and his grandson, Robert Pasin, has been CEO since 1997. Today, the company produces a wide range of children's products, including scooters, tricycles, ride-ons, horses, battery ops, and wagons.

In 2015, Fortune named Radio Flyer number one in the top 25 best small businesses for which to work.

== The wagon ==
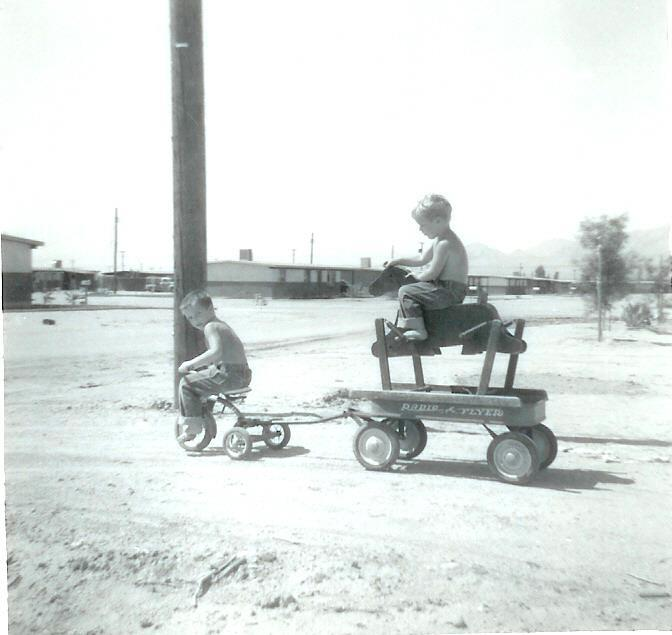
Radio Flyer wagon, tricycle and hobby horse circa 1960.

The Liberty Coaster Company began producing the wooden bodied "No. 4 Liberty Coaster" in 1923. In 1927, Pasin replaced the wooden body with stamped steel, taking advantage of assembly line manufacturing techniques and earning him the nickname "Little Ford". 1500 wagons a day rolled off assembly lines even during the Great Depression. Since 2002, the company has produced plastic as well as metal-bodied wagons.

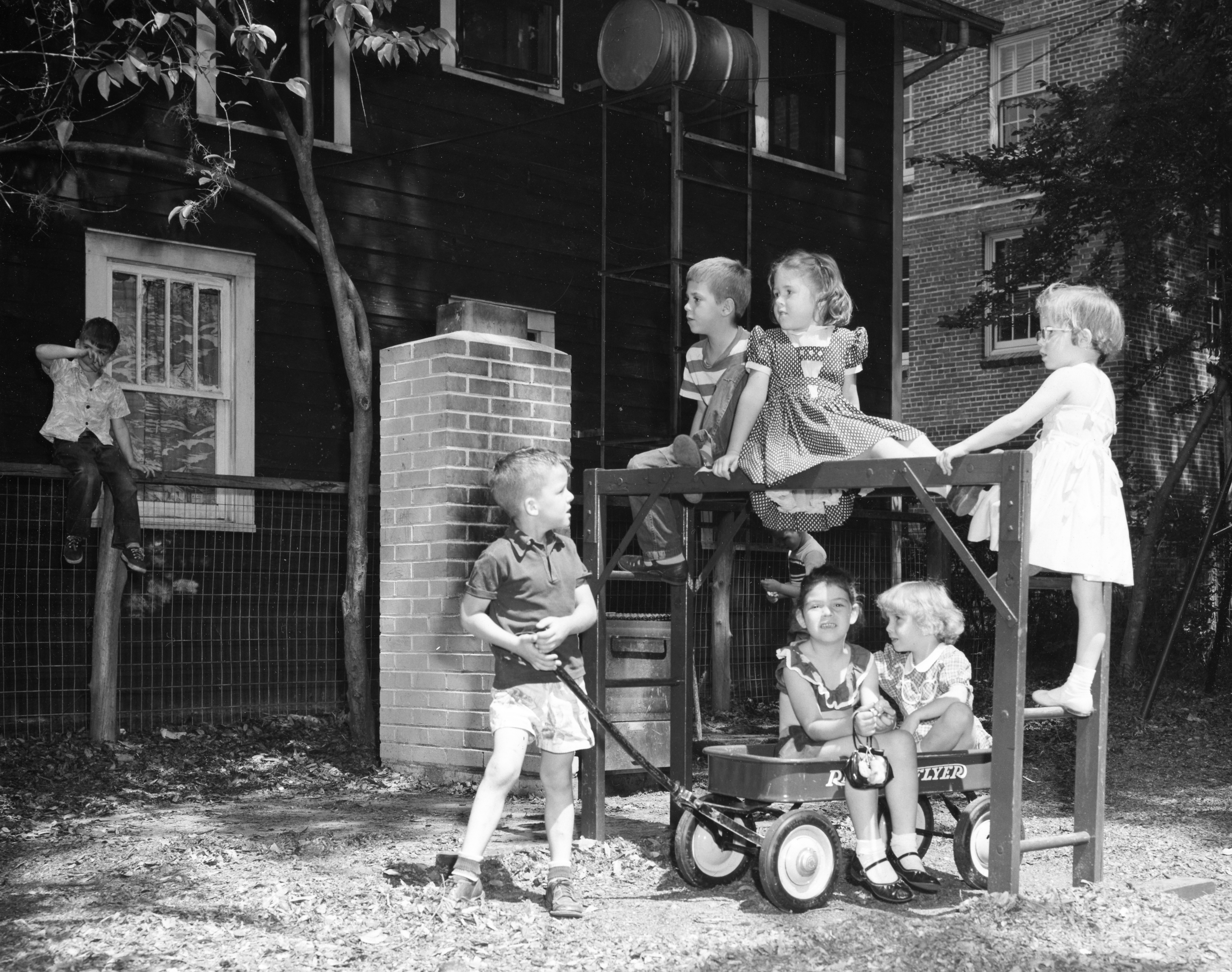
Children playing in a Radio Flyer red wagon in Jacksonville, Florida, 1950s.

A number of designs and styles have been produced by Radio Flyer, often inspired by the automobiles or popular culture of the day. The "Zephyr", produced in the 1930s, paid homage to the Chrysler Airflow. The 1950s saw a yellow wagon inspired by the movie Davy Crockett, King of the Wild Frontier and a blue wagon produced in partnership with Disney's Mickey Mouse Club. Wagons from the 1970s borrowed the stylings of the muscle cars of the day, including the Fireball 2001 inspired by Evel Knievel. The 1990s saw the introduction of the "Quad Shock Wagon" echoing sport utility vehicles. The "Ultimate Family Wagon", introduced in 2007, includes a sunshade and an adjustable seat; the design won a Chicago Innovation Award in 2007.

The Radio Flyer Wagon was inducted into the National Toy Hall of Fame at The Strong in Rochester, New York in 1999, and its creator, Antonio Pasin, was inducted into the Toy Industry Hall of Fame in 2003.

== Radio Flyer Tricycle ==
The Radio Flyer Tricycle features the same bright red color and graphics as the little red wagon.

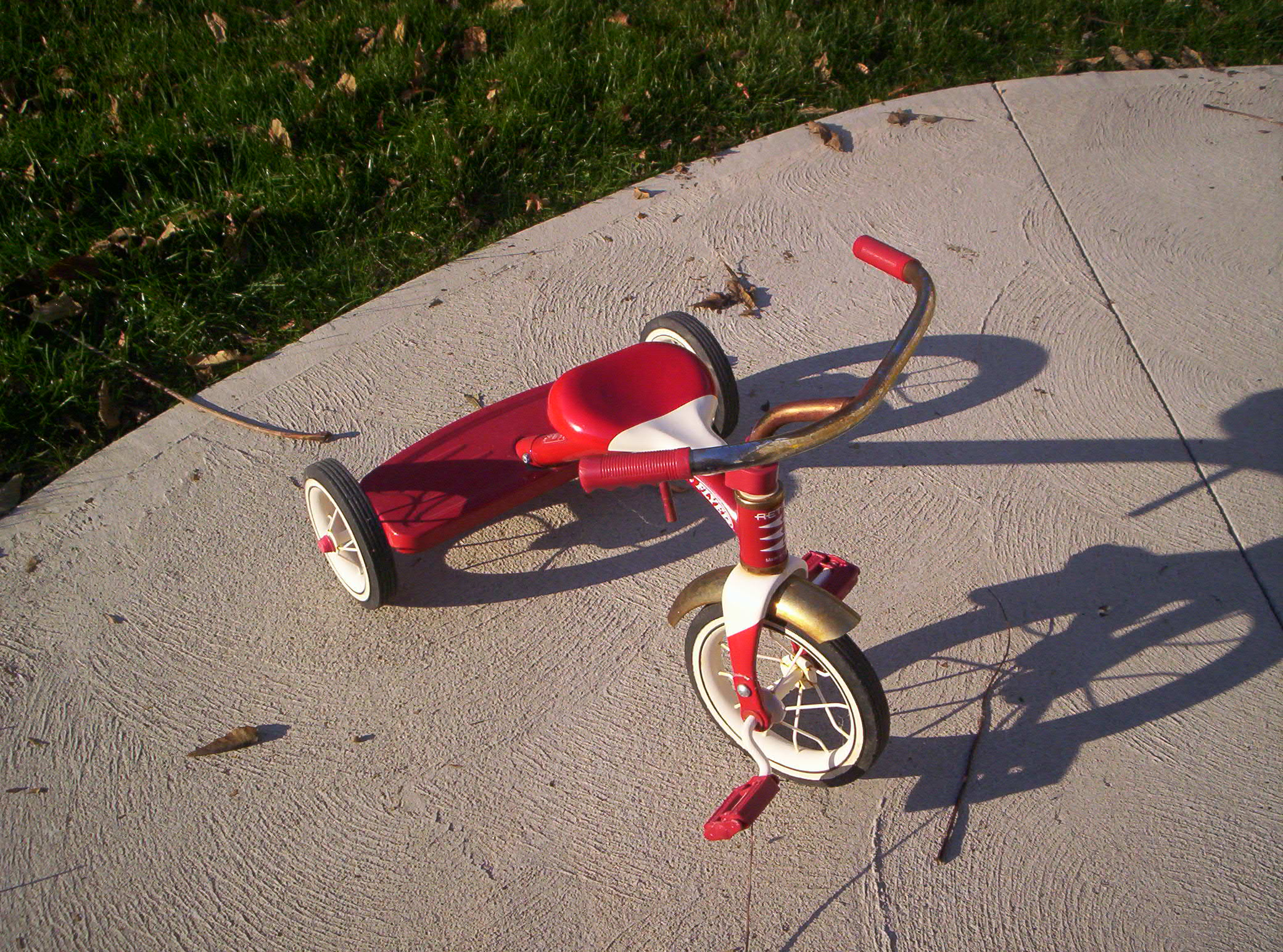
Radio Flyer Tricycle

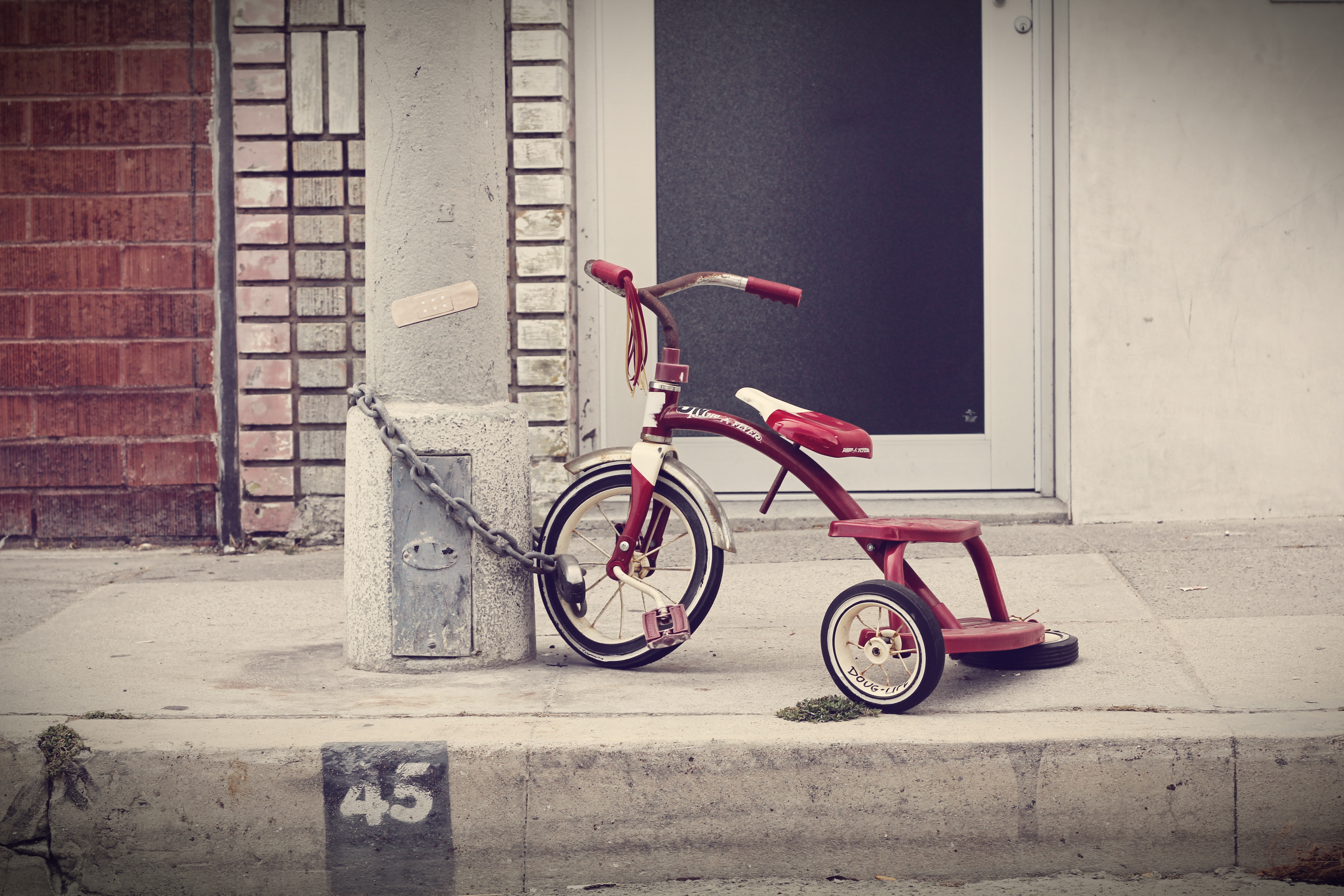
Radio Flyer Tricycle

== Other products ==
- The Inchworm is a wheeled ride-on toy propelled by the bouncing motion of the rider. It is styled as a Geometer caterpillar, or inchworm. It was initially produced by Hasbro in the 1970s.
- The Radio Flyer Ziggle, introduced in 2013, is a ride-on toy for kids 3 to 8 with four caster wheels and no pedals. Kids propel forward by wiggling and twisting their bodies in a back and forth motion and moving the handle bars at the same time.

== In popular culture ==
The readily recognizable little red wagon manufactured by Radio Flyer is used in several artistic works, including in film and on television. A character in the 1992 drama film Radio Flyer flies to safety in a converted Radio Flyer wagon. Radio Flyer wagons appear in a store display in the 1983 film A Christmas Story. The June 24, 2013 episode of Let's Make a Deal parodied this wagon as a Zonk being offered under the name "Zonk Flyer".

=== Sculptures ===
==== Statue ====
The 45-foot-tall (14 m) Coaster Boy wood and plaster statue of a young boy and wagon was constructed by Radio Flyer for the 1933 Chicago World's Fair, Century of Progress.

==== Red wagon playground ====
Riverfront Park in Spokane, Washington features a large red wagon that doubles as a playground slide. It is 12 feet (3.7 m) high and 27 feet (8.2 m) long. The interactive sculpture is modeled after the Radio Flyer wagon, and was sculpted by Ken Spiering and installed in 1989.

==== "World's Largest Wagon" ====
The "World's Largest Wagon" is a sculpture commissioned by Radio Flyer in honor of their 80th anniversary. It is nine times the size of a little red wagon, and weighs 15,000 pounds (6,800 kg).
