= Stephen D. Hassenfeld =

American businessman (1942–1989)

- Born: January 19, 1942
- Died: June 25, 1989 (aged 47)
- Title: CEO; President
- Board member of: Hasbro
- Relatives: Sylvia Hassenfeld (mother) Alan G. Hassenfeld (brother)

Stephen David Hassenfeld (January 19, 1942 – June 25, 1989) was an American businessman best known for being the chairman and chief executive officer of Hasbro from 1980 until 1989. During his tenure, Hassenfeld restored the reputation of Hasbro and surpassed Mattel as the world's largest toy manufacturer.

== Early life ==
Stephen was born in Rhode Island to Sylvia Grace (née Kay) and Merrill Hassenfeld. He was the oldest of three siblings, the others being his sister Ellie and the youngest child, Alan. They lived in Providence's east side, where he attended Moses Brown School.

== Accomplishments ==
Stephen's grandfather, Henry Hassenfeld, was a Jewish immigrant from Poland who, with his brother Helal, founded a textile company that sold remnants called Hassenfeld Brothers. The brothers would move on to sell pencil boxes, school supplies, and later, toys. After the success of Mr. Potato Head and G.I. Joe, the Hassenfeld Brothers would create Hasbro Industries in 1968 and begin to list on the New York Stock Exchange.

In 1980, Stephen's father, Merrill, died. Stephen took over control of Hasbro. From 1980 to 1986, Stephen Hassenfeld increased Hasbro's profitability by 85% annually. Only two Fortune 500 companies have achieved such a high rate of growth in profitability. Forbes magazine rated Hasbro number one in a thousand-corporation survey of increased value during the first half of the 1980s, well ahead of other successful companies such as Wal-Mart and Berkshire Hathaway.

In 1983, Hassenfeld established the Hasbro Charitable Trust, and in 1984, he created Hasbro Children's Foundation. The two charities help to improve the lives of children and their families throughout the world by providing management of grant donations in operating areas, product donation, matching gifts to higher education, special community projects, and volunteering. In addition, in 1990, the Stephen D. Hassenfeld Children's Center for Cancer and Blood Disorders was created. The center is directly affiliated with the pediatrics department of the New York University Grossman School of Medicine.

== Legacy ==
Stephen D. Hassenfeld died of pneumonia and cardiac arrest in 1989 at the age of 47 after quietly and privately battling AIDS since early 1987, and is buried next to his father in Lincoln Park Cemetery in Warwick, Rhode Island. In 1991, he was posthumously inducted into the Toy Industry Hall of Fame. At the time of Hassenfeld's death, Hasbro was a company with annual net revenues of more than $1.3 billion.

== Awards and honors ==
- Honorary doctorate degrees from Rhode Island College, Bryant College, Providence College and Roger Williams College
- Golden Plate Award of the American Academy of Achievement, 1987
- Toy Industry Hall of Fame, 1991
- National Humanitarian Award of the Rhode Island Council of the National Jewish Hospital
- Humanitarian of the Year Award from the Rhode Island Big Brothers Association
- International Licensing Industry Merchandisers’ Association Hall of Fame, 2010
