= Alan G. Hassenfeld =

American businessman and philanthropist (1948–2025)

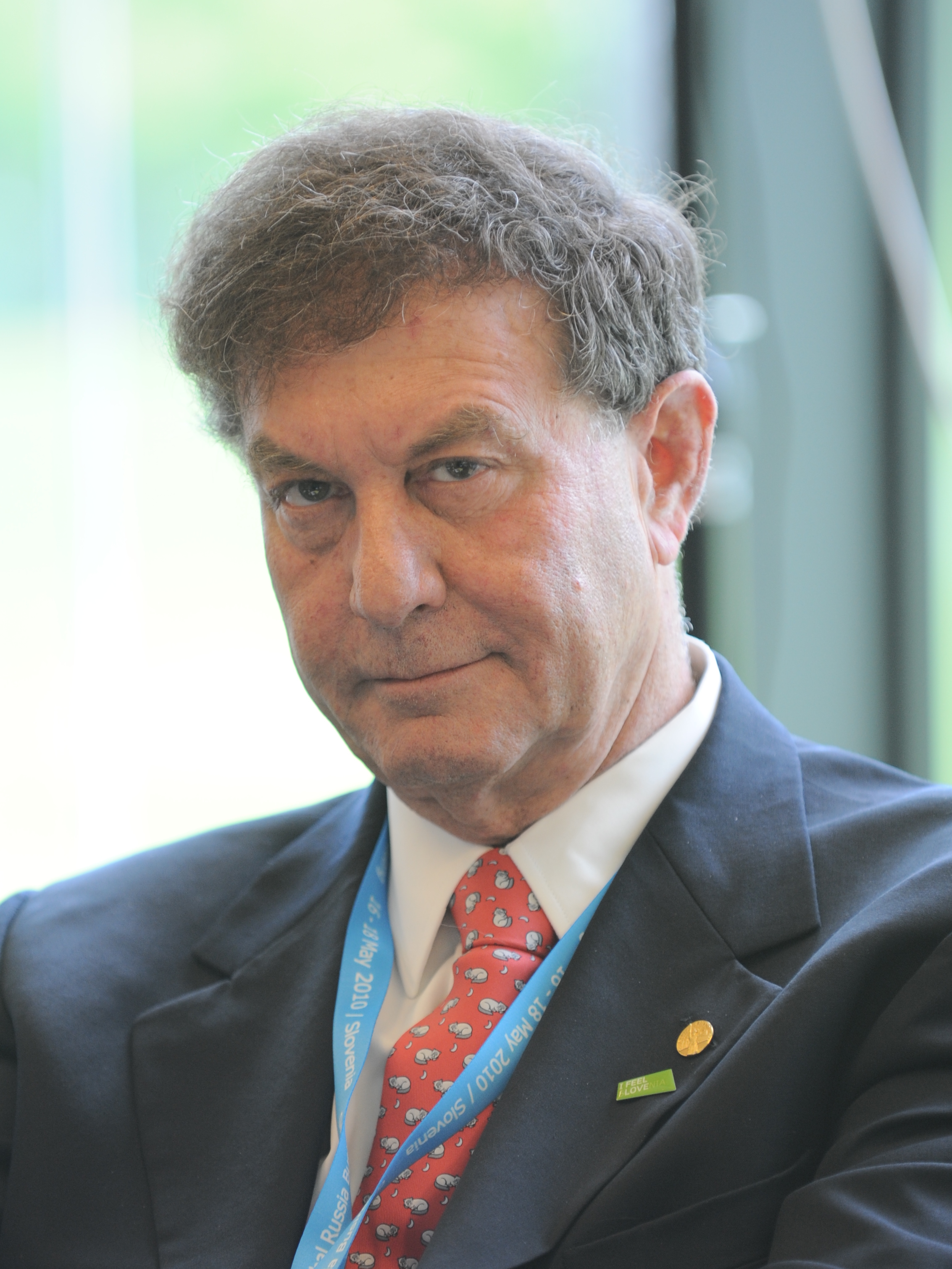
- Hassenfeld in 2010
- Born: Alan Geoffrey Hassenfeld; November 16, 1948; Providence, Rhode Island, U.S.
- Died: July 8, 2025 (aged 76); London, England
- Occupations: Chairman and chief executive officer of Hasbro Toys
- Parent(s): Sylvia Grace Kay Hassenfeld; Merrill Hassenfeld
- Relatives: Stephen D. Hassenfeld (brother)

Alan Geoffrey Hassenfeld (November 16, 1948 – July 8, 2025) was an American businessman who was a past chairman and chief executive officer of Hasbro Toys.

== Biography ==
=== Early life ===
Alan Geoffrey Hassenfeld was born in Providence, Rhode Island, on November 16, 1948 to Merrill Hassenfeld and Sylvia Grace Kay Hassenfeld. He earned a bachelor's degree from the University of Pennsylvania.

=== Career ===
Hasbro was founded as a family business by Alan's grandfather and grand-uncle in Pawtucket, Rhode Island in 1923. Alan Hassenfeld joined the firm in 1970 at the request of his brother Stephen D. Hassenfeld. He was named vice president of international operations and vice president of marketing and sales in 1972. In 1984 he was named president. Alan became CEO of Hasbro in 1989 after the death of Stephen, and remained in the position until 2003.

As chairman and chief executive, he diversified Hasbro's portfolio of companies and expanded international operations while initiating a brand of corporate activism designed to improve the lives of children. He was inducted into the Toy Industry Hall of Fame in 1996.

Hassenfeld continued to serve as chairman emeritus of Hasbro through 2024.

=== Death ===
Hassenfeld died in London on July 8, 2025, at the age of 76.

== Philanthropy ==
- Hassenfeld was a founding benefactor of Hasbro Children's Hospital in Providence.
- Hassenfeld donated the Teddy Fountain to the city of Jerusalem.
- In 2008, Hassenfeld established the nonprofit Hassenfeld Family Initiative LLC, an organization focused on women and children's rights and safety
- Bryant University renamed their Public Leadership institute after Hassenfeld in 2012.
- In 2014, Hassenfeld made a major gift to establish the Hassenfeld Family Innovation Center at Brandeis University, and has funded the Hassenfeld Foundation Scholarship, and other scholarships and endowments there.
- A $12.5 million gift from the family of Alan Hassenfeld established the Hassenfeld Child Health Innovation Institute at Brown University in 2015.
- Hassenfeld served on the Brown University Board of Trustees from 1990 to 1996, and again from 2020 until his death.
