= Women's Hockey League =

Women's Hockey League may refer to:

== Ice hockey ==
=== Top-level leagues ===
- Australian Women's Ice Hockey League (AWIHL), founded in 2005
- Bulgarian Women's Hockey League
- European Women's Hockey League (EWHL), formerly called Elite Women's Hockey League, founded 2004
- German Women's Ice Hockey League (DFEL)
- Icelandic Women's Hockey League
- Italian Hockey League Women
- Liga Nacional de Hockey Hielo Femenino (LNHHF; lit. 'National Women's Ice Hockey League'), a league in Spain
- Professional Women's Hockey League (PWHL), a professional North American league founded in 2023
- Swedish Women's Hockey League (SDHL)
- Turkish Women's Ice Hockey League
- Women's Hockey League, official name of the Zhenskaya Hockey League (ZhHL), a professional ice hockey league in Russia
- Women's Japan Ice Hockey League (WJIHL), founded in 2012

=== Other leagues ===
- Eastern Collegiate Women's Hockey League (ECWHL), an American league founded in 2003
- Junior Women's Hockey League (JWHL), a North American junior league founded in 2007
- Mid-Atlantic Women's Hockey League (MAWHL), an American senior amateur league founded in 1975
- Provincial Women's Hockey League (Provincial WHL), a junior league in Ontario founded in 2004
- Western Women's Collegiate Hockey League (WWCHL), an American league founded in 2014

=== Defunct leagues ===
- Canadian Women's Hockey League (CWHL), a senior league which was active 2007–2019
- Central Ontario Women's Hockey League (COWHL), a senior league which was active 1992–1998
- National Women's Hockey League (NWHL; renamed to Premier Hockey Federation (PHF) in 2021), a North American league that operated from 2015 to 2023
- National Women's Hockey League (NWHL), a North American league which was active 1999–2007
- Russian Women's Hockey League (RWHL, 1995–2015), predecessor of the Women's Hockey League (a.k.a. Zhenskaya Hockey League)
- Western Women's Hockey League (WWHL), a Canadian league which was active 2004–2011

== Field hockey ==
- Women's Australian Hockey League
- Women's Belgian Hockey League
- Women's England Hockey League
- Women's Euro Hockey League
- Women's Irish Hockey League
