= Sylvia Hassenfeld =

American philanthropist (1920–2014)

Sylvia K. Hassenfeld
- Born: Sylvia Grace Kay; September 19, 1920; Philadelphia, Pennsylvania, United States
- Died: August 15, 2014 (aged 93); Manhattan, New York City, U.S.
- Occupation: Philanthropist
- Parent(s): Sophie Kay; Joseph Kay
- Relatives: Alan G. Hassenfeld (son); Ellen Hassenfeld Block (daughter); Stephen D. Hassenfeld (son)

Sylvia K. Hassenfeld (September 19, 1920 – August 15, 2014) was an American communal leader, philanthropist, human rights advocate, and one of the first women to head a major international Jewish aid organization.

== Early life ==
Sylvia Grace Kay was born in Philadelphia on September 19, 1920, the only child of Sophie (Flieglman) and Joseph Kay, who was a hosiery manufacturer. In 1940, Sylvia married Merrill L. Hassenfeld, whose father, Henry, and his uncles Hillel and Herman, had founded Hasbro toys in 1923, and moved to Providence, Rhode Island. Merrill became the president of Hasbro in 1943 and CEO in 1960, a position he held until his death in 1979. Sylvia earned her bachelor's degree from Cedar Crest College in 1944. She and her husband had three children, Stephen D. Hassenfeld, who led Hasbro from 1979 until his death in 1989, Alan G. Hassenfeld, who led the company from 1989 to 2008 and remained a trustee until his death in 2025, and Ellen Hassenfeld Block. She served as a director of the board of trustees of Hasbro and was also involved in the early test-marketing of many Hasbro products while her children were growing up but her main interest was philanthropy.

== Philanthropic and communal work ==
Sylvia was involved in numerous Jewish philanthropic organizations, including as the national chairwoman of the women's division of the United Jewish Appeal, and the vice chairwoman of the Jerusalem Foundation, and was on the executive boards of trustees of the United Israel Appeal, the Jewish Agency for Israel, Brandeis University, and the Israel Museum. She was also the president of the Hassenfeld Foundation, which supports Jewish causes, hospitals and medical centers, and academic and educational institutions around the globe.

After her son Stephen's death in 1989, Sylvia took a leadership role in the Hasbro Children's Foundation, a charity that Stephen founded in 1984 to help poor and homeless children and their families throughout the world. She also founded the Stephen D. Hassenfeld Children's Center for Cancer and Blood Disorders at N.Y.U. Medical Center in 1990. In addition, she donated money toward the development of a children's hospital at the NYU Langone Medical Center, where she was a trustee. The Hassenfeld Children's Hospital opened in 2018.

== American Jewish Joint Distribution Committee ==
Mrs. Hassenfeld was the first female president of the American Jewish Joint Distribution Committee (JDC), from 1988 to 1992. In this position, she helped to found the International Development Program (IDP), a non-sectarian emergency aid organization, in response to the December 1988 Armenian earthquake. The charter flights bringing severely injured earthquake victims to Israel marked the first time that the JDC offered crisis help to non-Jews. Also in 1988, she oversaw the JDC's return to the Soviet Union, the first time the organization had been in the Soviet Union since the dissolution of the Agro-Joint in 1938. Hassenfeld, through the JDC, was involved with the rescue of Serbs, Croats, Muslims, and Jews from Sarajevo during the Breakup of Yugoslavia in the early 1990s and aided Jewish outreach in Central and Eastern Europe, including the resettling in various countries of Jews leaving after the break-up of the Soviet Union. She also oversaw JDC operations in the Middle East and Africa, most dramatically the 1991 Operation Solomon airlift rescue of over 14,000 Ethiopian Jews, bringing them to settle in Israel.

== Awards and accolades ==
Sylvia Hassenfeld received numerous awards and honors in recognition of more than fifty years of national and international philanthropic and humanitarian leadership. The Hassenfeld family was very closely connected with Brandeis University from its earliest days, including her father-in-law, husband, and her children. She received an Honorary Doctorate in Humane Letters from Brandeis University in 1998 in “recognition of her leadership, activism and philanthropy.”

She was made an Honorary Citizen of Jerusalem, a presidential appointee to the United States Holocaust Memorial Council, was awarded the 1994 Emma Lazarus Statue of Liberty Award by the American Jewish Historical Society, and was honored by the National Conference of Christians and Jews.

Sylvia K. Hassenfeld died on Saturday, August 15, 2014, at her home in Manhattan. She was 93.
