= Madame Alexander Doll Company =

American Toy Company

- Industry: Toys and dolls
- Founded: 1923
- Founder: Beatrice Alexander
- Headquarters: New York, U.S.
- Products: Collectible dolls
- Website: www.madamealexander.com

Madame Alexander Doll Company is an American manufacturer of collectible dolls, founded in 1923 by Beatrice Alexander in New York City.

Madame Alexander created the first doll based on a licensed character – Scarlett O'Hara from the book and movie Gone with the Wind. She was also one of the early creators of mass-produced dolls of living people, with dolls of the Dionne quintuplets in 1936 and a set of 36 Queen Elizabeth II dolls to commemorate the 1953 coronation celebrations in Britain.

Madame Alexander's Wendy doll, from the 2004 Total Moves collection

The company's most popular doll, the 8-inch Wendy doll was introduced in the 1950s. There is also their first fashion doll, Cissy, and Pussycat, a vinyl baby doll. Alexandra Fairchild Ford is a line of 16-inch collectible fashion dolls created for adult collectors.

Other Madame Alexander dolls include: Mary, Queen of Scots Portrait Doll, Heidi, the characters from Little Women, and a series of international dolls dressed in native costumes. Alexander also created many topical doll series, such as "The First Ladies of the United States," depicting each in her inaugural gown, as well as "The Opera Series", and "Fairy Tale Series."

In 2009, Madame Alexander began creating dolls for Dollie & Me, matching clothing for girls and dolls. In June 2012, Madame Alexander Doll Company was sold to Kahn Lucas, owner of Dollie & Me.

Isaac Mizrahi of Xcel Brands designed costumes for Madame Alexander dolls under the Isaac Mizrahi New York label." The collection premiered at the American International Toy Fair in New York in 2014.

The Madame Alexander Doll Club is separate from Madame Alexander Doll Company, but the company creates limited-edition dolls for club events. The club holds events and conventions all over the United States. The Review is the club's magazine.
