= Hassenfeld Children's Hospital =

Children's Hospital in NY, United States

- NYU Langone Health

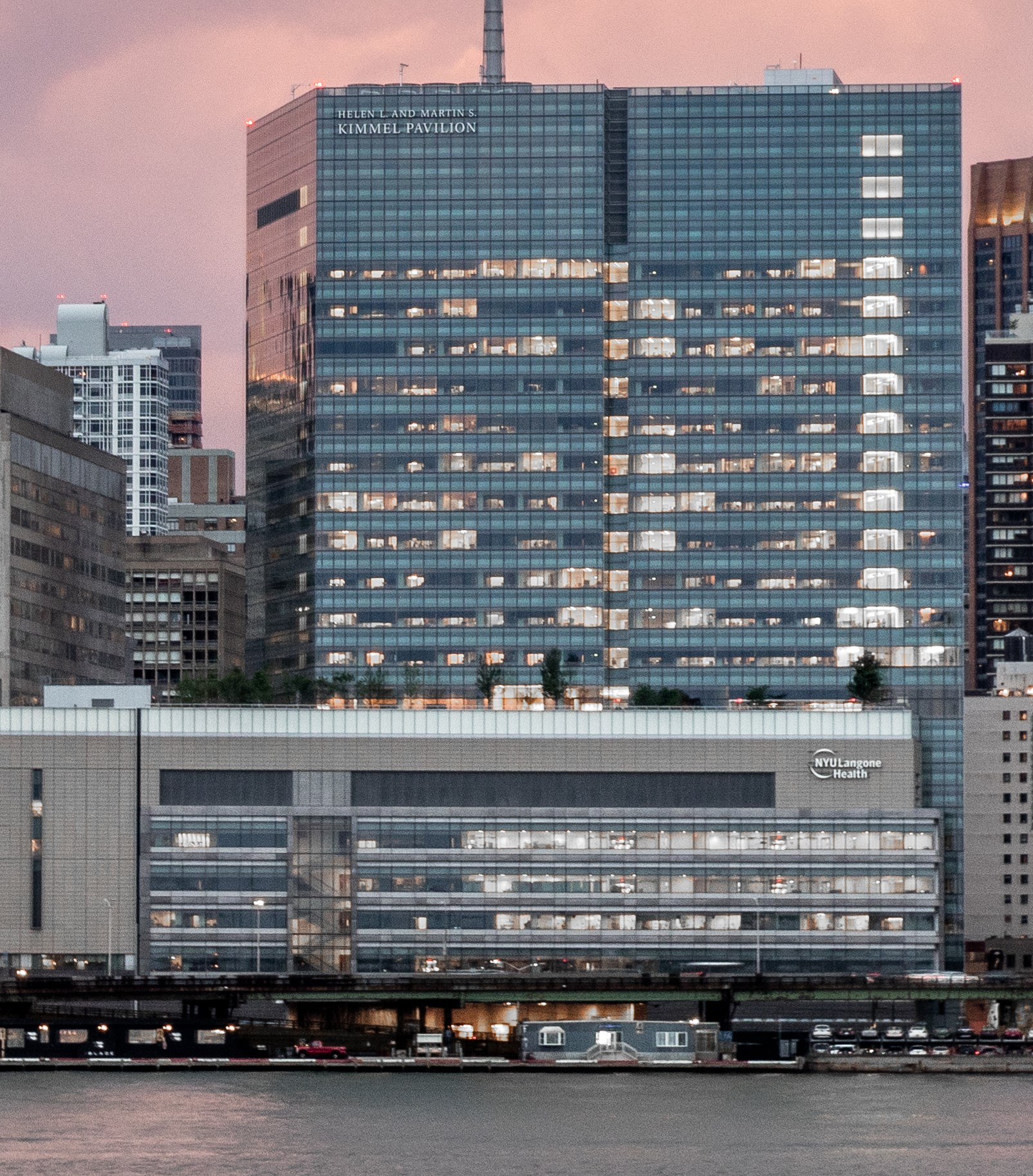
- The Kimmel Pavilion which houses Hassenfeld Children's Hospital

Geography
- Location: 430 E 34th Street, New York, NY, United States
- Coordinates: 40°44′34″N 73°58′23″W

Organization
- Type: Children's Hospital
- Affiliated university: NYU Grossman School of Medicine

Services
- Emergency department: Yes - Pediatric
- Beds: 102

History
- Former name: Children's Health at NYU Hospitals Center
- Constructed: 2014
- Founded: June 24, 2018

Links
- Website: nyulangone.org/locations/hassenfeld-childrens-hospital
- Lists: Hospitals in the United States

Hassenfeld Children's Hospital (HCH) at NYU Langone (formerly Children's Health at NYU Hospitals Center) is a pediatric acute-care children's hospital located on the NYU Langone Health campus in Manhattan, New York. Hassenfeld Children's Hospital has 102 pediatric beds and is located in the Helen L. and Martin S. Kimmel Pavilion. It is directly affiliated with the pediatrics department of the New York University Grossman School of Medicine. The hospital treats infants, children, teens, and young adults aged 0–21, with some programs treating up until age 25. While not a trauma center, Hassenfeld Children's Hospital contains the KiDS Emergency Department to treat children with injuries.

== History ==
Pediatrics at NYU Langone Medical Center dates back to the merger of two New York-based schools, University Medical College and Bellevue Hospital College merging to form the University and Bellevue Hospital Medical College in 1898. NYU long partnered with nearby Bellevue Hospital (Bellevue) to provide pediatric care to the city's children. In 1874, Abraham Jacobi, (now commonly known as the “father of pediatrics”) came to University Medical College becoming the first chief of pediatrics at Bellevue. In 1908, John Howland, became the new chair of pediatrics at NYU and Bellevue. Howland is credited with ushering in the new age of pediatrics.

Before the opening of the current hospital, NYU pediatrics were housed within a 55-bed unit located within the Tisch Hospital adjacent to the current location, and a 30-bed pediatric unit at Bellevue.

In 2011, Children's Health at NYU Hospitals Center was named the Hassenfeld Children's Hospital after board member, Sylvia Hassenfeld of Hasbro, donated $50 million for the hospital's development. On June 24, 2018, the new building for Hassenfeld Children's Hospital opened, making it the newest children's hospital in New York and the only one to open within the past 15 years. The new hospital opened with a multitude of technologies designed to improve patient experience and automate repetitive tasks. The hospital opened with a 30-foot-tall fiberglass sculpture of a Dalmatian dog balancing a life-size taxi on its nose, designed by noted American sculptor, Donald Lipski. Upon opening, HCH became the only children's hospital in New York to feature all single, private rooms. In March 2021, HCH opened an expanded unit for pediatric and adult congenital cardiology on the 7th floor of the hospital. The program is one of three in New York certified by the Adult Congenital Heart Association.

In November 2021, HCH performed its first ever double-lung transplant on a 16-year-old with cystic fibrosis.

== About ==
Hassenfeld Children's Hospital features the KiDS Emergency Department through the Ronald O. Perelman Center for Emergency Services at NYU Langone. The hospital is home to more than 400 doctors representing more than 35 specialties.

HCH features many child-friendly features including a replica of the Statue of Liberty made entirely of Lego welcoming children and families at the entrance. HCH also features dedicated areas for children of all ages including a teen room, a sensory playroom, an arts room, and Skyline Studio, a broadcast studio where children and teens can create their own media productions.

The hospital has a fleet of 31 robots to handle more repetitive tasks, freeing up hospital employees to perform the more skilled tasks. Hassenfeld Children's Hospital also features an interactive touch screen and TV system in each patient room called "MyWall" giving patients and parents easy access to information and entertainment, including a PlayStation loaded with dozens of games.

=== Awards ===
In 2022, the hospital received a perfect score and named as an "equality leader" on the Human Rights Campaign LGBTQ+ Healthcare Equality Index list. The hospital was one of 32 children's hospitals in the nation to receive the score.

As of 2022–23, Hassenfeld Children's Hospital has placed nationally in 3 ranked pediatric specialties on U.S. News & World Report. The hospital is tied with Kravis Children's Hospital as the #3 best children's hospital in New York.

U.S. News & World Report Rankings for Hassenfeld Children's Hospital
Specialty	Rank (in the U.S.)	Score (out of 100)
Neonatology	45	72.1
Pediatric cardiology & heart surgery	25	73.0
Pediatric diabetes & endocrinology	48	67.5

== See also ==
- New York University Grossman School of Medicine
- New York University
- Kravis Children's Hospital
