= Women's League for Israel =

American-Israeli organization

- ליגת נשים למען ישראל
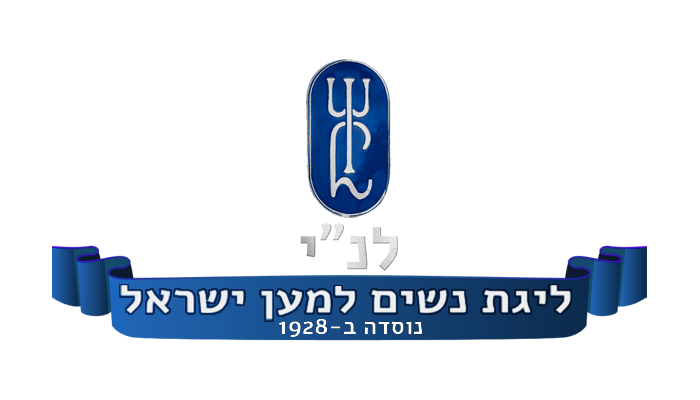
- Formation: New York City, 1928; 98 years ago
- Type: INGO
- Key people: Jan Schechter, President; Etti Pilpel Paz, Director General
- Website: womensleagueforisrael.org.il

Women's League for Israel (WLI; Hebrew: ליגת נשים למען ישראל), is a volunteer organization dedicated to social welfare, education and Aliyah in Israel.

== History ==
Women's League for Israel was established in 1928 in New-York as a nonprofit organization by a group of Jewish zionist women. The organization's goals were to aid the Yishuv in handling the social, educational and Aliyah challenges. WLI funded “pioneering homes” (in Hebrew: בתי חלוצות) for new immigrant women who came to Israel on their own without professional training and without knowledge of the Hebrew language. They worked and earned a living, learned the new language, life skills, the history of Jewish life and general culture.

The first “pioneering home” was built in 1932 in Haifa. The second opened in Tel-Aviv four years later and was enlarged soon after its completion. In 1943 the Jerusalem home was established in Rehavia. After the state of Israel was established, a new pioneering home was built in Netanya (1950). In the Netanya compound, WLI and the Ministry of Labor and Welfare have established the ‘Ora’ workshop – a protected hand weaving workshop for blind women, which won the Kaplan prize in 1959.

After the great waves of Aliyah subsided, WLI changed its focus to social welfare: helping needy students, troubled families, abused women and children and more. The pioneering homes were renamed, accordingly, to “WLI homes”.

In the 1950s Women's League pioneered a partnership with The Hebrew University in Jerusalem on projects to improve the welfare of the students. WLI endowed a Chair in Sociology and built the first dormitories for female students on the Givat Ram campus. WLI also built a student cafeteria and a three-building student center.

As a result of the 1967 Six-Day War, Jerusalem was reunited. Jews could once again pray at the Western Wall, and Mount Scopus – the original site of Hebrew University – was again accessible. WLI responded to the call that Mount Scopus be rebuilt, by building a three-winged dormitory on this campus. Later on, WLI was asked by the Israeli Government to help the Aliyah from the USSR. WLI initiated a National Rehabilitation and Vocational Training Center in the Netanya home. This home offered courses, ranging from a four-year vocation high school, a school for dental technicians and assistants, and another one for cooking and culinary arts. Also in Netanya, WLI offered after-school programs for elementary school children and volunteers for Meals on Wheels. In 1978, a street was named after WLI's name in Haifa.

WLI also established Family Therapy Center and Domestic Abuse Intervention Center with social workers in Haifa, Holon, and Tira, counseling abused women and children. WLI pioneered The Meeting Place for Troubled Families, originally set up in Haifa and expanded to Tel Aviv and Netanya. Children of divorced parents met with the noncustodial parent under the supervision of a social worker. In 2001, after the privatization of the service, WLI started running the “Foster Care in the center”, which operated in 3 locations: Tel Aviv, Netanya and Bnei Brak, and helped hundreds of children find a foster family.

== Today ==
The Pioneer Home in Tel Aviv serves as a dormitory for students and young Jews from around the world, who come to Israel through “The Israeli Experience” and Taglit sponsored by the Jewish Agency. The building in Haifa was sold, and the one in Jerusalem was handed over to Yad Ben Zvi. WLI continues to contribute to the Hebrew University in Jerusalem through its student scholarship fund. In 2008, WLI founded a 1.5 million dollar fund to award scholarships to outstanding BA students. In 2017, WLI founded another 1.4 million dollar fund to award scholarships to outstanding graduate students. Each year, WLI grants approximately 40 full scholarships to students.

After the second Lebanon war WLI has been collaborating with Haifa Rambam Medical Center in establishing a Trauma ER Centre for Children, and donated 1.5 million dollars for this purpose.

The current WLI president is Att. Jan Schechter and Att. Etti Pilpel Paz is the Director General.

== List of WLI’s Presidents ==
Years of Presidency	Name
1928-1929	Emma Gotheil
1929-1931	Rose Blumenthal
1931-1957	Jane Prince
1957–1963	Anna Cahane Neiditz
1963–1969	Anne Starr
1969–1975	Roslyn Shipper
1975–1981	Violet B. Wiles
1981–1986	Marilyn Schwartzman
1986–1989	Muriel Lunden
1989–1995	Trudy Miner
1995–2000	Harriet Lainer
2000–2016	Trudy Miner
2016–2017	Marlene Post
2018–	Jan Schechter
