= Dracula (Castlevania) =

Video game character

- Castlevania character
- Dracula from Symphony of the Night
- First appearance: Castlevania (1986)
- Created by: Hitoshi Akamatsu
- Based on: Count Dracula by Bram Stoker
- Designed by: Noriyasu Togakushi (original design); Ayami Kojima (Castlevania: Symphony of the Night onwards)
- Voiced by: English: Crispin Freeman (as Mathias Cronqvist in Castlevania: Lament of Innocence, as Dracula in Dead by Daylight); Douglas Rye (2005–2006); Patrick Seitz (2007–2011); Robert Carlyle (Lords of Shadow series); Graham McTavish (Netflix series, Belmont's Curse); Vinay Murthy (Castlevania: Grimoire of Souls); Neil Newbon (Vampire Survivors); Japanese: Hiroya Ishimaru (1993); Norio Wakamoto (1997–2012); Nobuhiko Kazama (as Mathias Cronqvist in Castlevania: Lament of Innocence); Mahito Ōba (2005); Jouji Nakata (2009); Keiji Fujiwara (Lords of Shadow); Koichi Yamadera (Lords of Shadow 2); Naoya Uchida (Netflix series)

Dracula Vlad Țepeș (Japanese: ドラキュラ・ヴラド・ツェペシュ, Hepburn: Dorakyura Vurado Tsepeshu) or simply known as Dracula (Japanese: ドラキュラ, Hepburn: Dorakyura), real name Mathias Cronqvist, is a fictional character and the main antagonist of Konami's Castlevania video game series. A vampire and sorcerer, he is the archenemy of the Belmont clan and the final boss of many installments. In the series reboot Castlevania: Lords of Shadow, Dracula is reimagined as an 11th-century holy knight named Gabriel Belmont and serves as the central character of the game and its two sequels. The Lords of Shadow series tells the story of Gabriel's quest to save the world, vampirism and redemption.

The Dracula of Castlevania is based on Bram Stoker's character from the novel of the same name, who was in turn likely named for Vlad III Dracula of Wallachia. The Dracula of the Castlevania series draws inspiration from both, but instead of only preying on victims, this version threatens the whole world and humankind as a dark lord (Demon King in Japanese). Nevertheless, further games explore a sign of humanity in the form of his love towards his wife, who had a child named Alucard with him. Dracula was created by game director Hitoshi Akamatsu, who was fond of horror films when creating the Castlevania franchise. Koji Igarashi further expanded on his character, starting with Castlevania: Symphony of the Night. Meanwhile, the reboot by MercurySteam was meant to show the character as more sympathetic in his transformation from a vampire hunter to Dracula.

Critical response to Dracula has been largely positive, establishing him as one of the most iconic video game villains. His portrayal in the Lords of Shadow trilogy received mixed reviews from game journalists, who praised the tragic elements of his story in the first two games, but criticized his characterization as Dracula for being too contrived. Meanwhile, his appearance in the Netflix animated series was received positively for coming across as more human, despite being a villain.

== Conception and design ==
=== Original concept by Konami ===
The Castlevania franchise heavily references the horror films produced by Universal Pictures and Hammer Film Productions. Creator of the series, Hitoshi Akamatsu, wanted players to feel like they were in a classic horror film. They started with the concept of "we wanted to make a Dracula game" and since the image of a vampire is strongly associated with Dracula, moreso than any other vampire, they believed he was the most suitable adversary for Simon Belmont. Akamatsu then bought various books related to vampires and Dracula and the history of Europe in order to further expand on the original idea. While he personally did not have any particular attachment to vampires, he found their power to revive as many times as possible, despite their weaknesses, was charming.

In the first Castlevania, Dracula's decapitation foreshadows his revival in the sequel. When the body parts scatter in every direction, this was also meant to show that Dracula will come back. The second monstrous form the player fight was meant to be an "incarnation of the curse of man", and not Dracula himself. That is why when Simon defeats him, he gets cursed. Akamatsu also explained the rotating gears in Dracula's castle only turn so long as Dracula is alive. That is why only the clock tower collapses in Castlevania's ending, but the rest of the castle remains standing, which Akamatsu said hinted towards a sequel. This also references cliffhangers from horror films.

Koji Igarashi became one of the most common producers behind Castlevania following the sequel Symphony of the Night. Dracula's son, Alucard, was chosen as the protagonist for the installment, not only because of his relationship with Dracula, but also because of the new designs provided. Their last fight in the game places special emphasis on humanity, highlighted through Alucard's dialogue, where he reminds Dracula of his wife, Lisa. Dracula's recurring presence in all the Castlevania games led to the decision to introduce his reincarnation, Soma Cruz, in Aria of Sorrow. This character development marked a significant shift in the character's direction.

=== Alternative portrayals ===
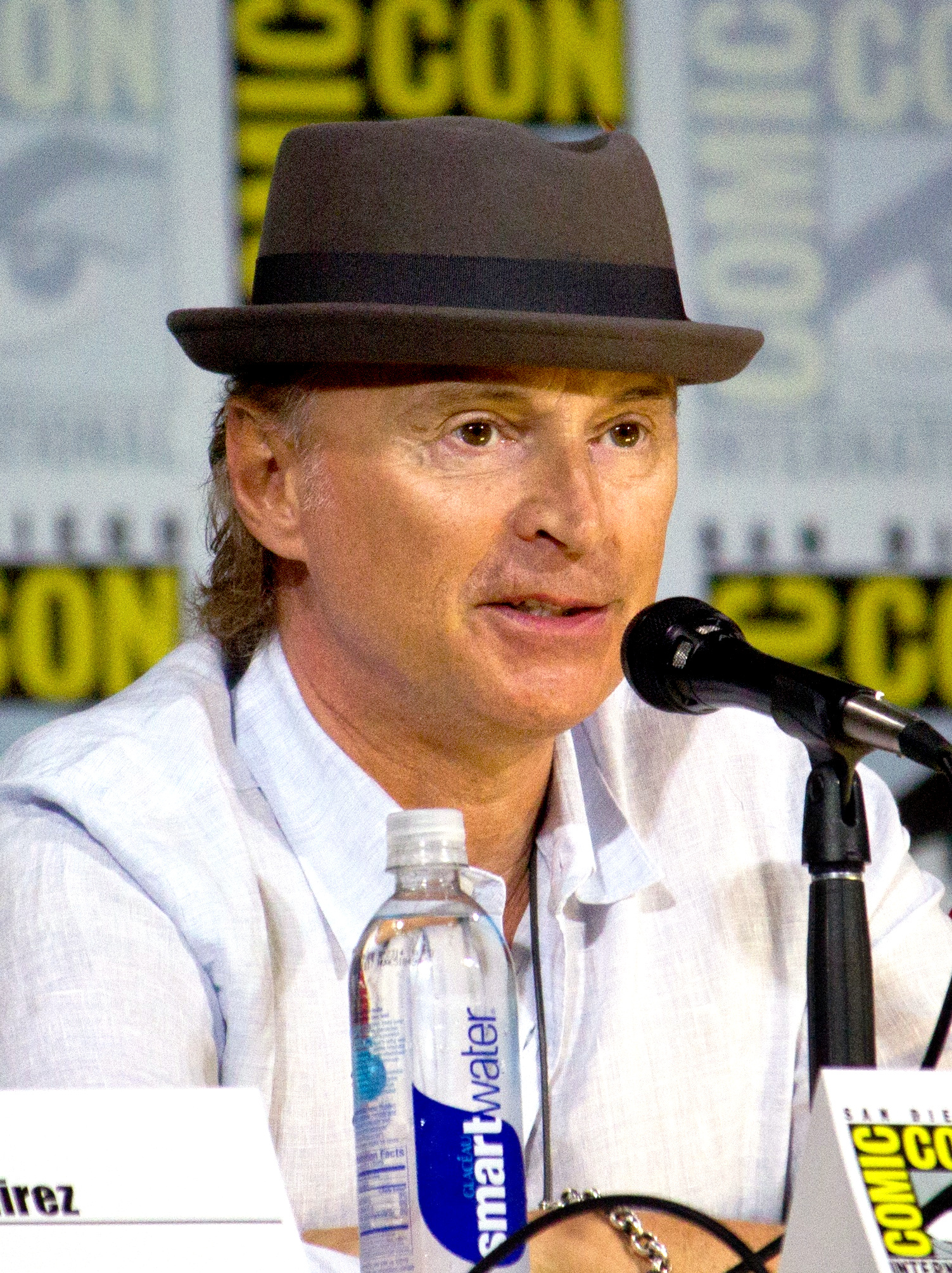
Dracula's appearance in Lords of Shadow was inspired by his voice actor Robert Carlyle.

For the Lords of Shadow series, in which Dracula is playable, his design was influenced by his voice actor Robert Carlyle. Producer Dave Cox said that thanks to Carlyle's input, Gabriel's design was changed more. Cox used Tony Soprano from the television drama The Sopranos as an example in regards to Dracula's characterization. By Lords of Shadow 2, Dracula starts questioning his actions. Hideo Kojima's input included advising Cox's team to redesign some of the lead character, Gabriel, who he felt needed a "more heroic face". Originally, Gabriel's design resembled a classic barbarian, before Kojima then advised the staff to refine him into a character that was more relatable for the player. Cox mentioned that the voice acting provided by Robert Carlyle helped humanize Gabriel's character.

For Lords of Shadow Mirror of Fate, Alucard's human form, Trevor Belmont, was created in a parallel with Gabriel. MercurySteam had more freedom with this game, resulting in connections between the Belmont and Dracula. Despite being Dracula's child, Alucard was designed with the idea of being his opposite, fighting on the side of good. The staff wanted Trevor to stand out and not look identical to Gabriel. The themes of fate and parallels between the bloodlines involving Alucard and Dracula was inspired by Christopher Nolan's movie, Memento (2000). The powers Alucard has access in the Lords of Shadow reboot were loosely based on Symphony of the Night. The wolf transformation in particular was used to assist Dracula in latter parts from the third game.

For Lords of Shadow 2, Gabriel had turned into Dracula which was the main focus of the game as it was the first time a mainline Castlevania title made him playabale. This led to new forms of combat not seen before in the franchise, and the player gets stronger in order to make Dracula powerful enough to kill Satan, the reboot's antagonist. The scene where Dracula kills a family member was meant to be harsh: "He's an evil man, who does evil things, but you can identify with him, you can feel sorry for him" according to Cox, who said that this scene was meant to contrast Gabriel with Bela Lugosi's take on Dracula as well as previous incarnations in the Castlevania series. In other scenes when talking to Trevor, Dracula still shows love for his child. Mercury tried to portray him as a real person, which was Robert Carlyle's contribution. Carlyle said, "I don't want to portray him as constantly evil or angry. "He certainly gets angry in the game, but he's determined, soft spoken most of the time. We wanted to portray him as a real character." Other actors were considered for the role of Dracula, but the staff very quickly realized they wanted Carlyle when they started working with him.

When Netflix created an animated series based on the franchise, director Adam Deats wanted to focus on Dracula's humanity by showing his transformation into a villain with the death of his wife, Lisa. "By giving Dracula the human dimension that he really has to have to make the story sustainable, you have to find the human element in him". As a result the staff does not consider this Dracula evil. Warren Ellis' writing was praised by the staff as he has an "instinct for creating that human dimension for a character that makes you want to spend time with them even if what they ultimately do is not something that you're supportive of".

== Appearances ==
Dracula first appeared in 1986's Castlevania, set in the year 1691. Simon Belmont ventures into Dracula's castle to defeat him. The plot of Castlevania was re-used in the games Vampire Killer, Haunted Castle, Super Castlevania IV and Castlevania Chronicles. In the manual of the second game, Castlevania II: Simon's Quest, it is revealed that, in his dying moments at the end of the first game, Dracula placed a curse on Simon, which condemned him to slowly die from his injuries. In 1698, Simon sets out to gather Dracula's scattered body parts and use them to resurrect Dracula in the ruins of his castle, where he defeats him. In Hitoshi Akamatsu's last game, the prequel Castlevania III: Dracula's Curse, Dracula unleashes his army of monsters on Europe in 1476. The people of Wallachia secure the aid of Trevor Belmont, who journeys to Castlevania with the help of Grant Danasty, Sypha Belnades and Dracula's son Alucard, and he becomes the first Belmont to defeat Dracula.

In Castlevania: The Adventure, set in 1576, Christopher Belmont defeats Dracula. In Castlevania II: Belmont's Revenge, it is revealed that Dracula escaped and survived until 1591, when he kidnapped Christopher's son Soleil and tried to turn him against his father. Christopher defeats Dracula again and saves his son. Castlevania: Rondo of Blood takes place in 1792 and stars a new Belmont named Richter. This was the first game in the series to use substantial voice acting to further the narrative. Dracula is resurrected by a cult led by a dark priest named Shaft. He proceeds to kidnap several villagers, including Richter's girlfriend Annette and a child named Maria Renard. In the "best" ending of the game, Richter saves all the kidnapped women and defeats Dracula.

Castlevania: Symphony of the Night, stars Dracula's son Alucard who enters the castle five years after Richter's victory. Symphony of the Night introduced the character of Lisa, Alucard's mother and Dracula's wife who had been falsely executed on charges of witchcraft centuries prior, leaving Dracula grief stricken. Alucard discovers that Shaft had placed Richter under a dark spell, the plan being that Richter could defeat all other enemies of Dracula. Alucard then defeats Shaft, saves Richter, and faces his resurrected father. They exchange words before Alucard kills him, telling him Lisa's last words: "Do not hate humans. If you cannot live with them, then at least do them no harm, for theirs is already a hard lot". Dracula cries out for Lisa's forgiveness as he returns to the abyss.

Castlevania: Bloodlines is set in 1917. The protagonists are John Morris and Eric Lecarde. This game introduced Dracula's niece, Elizabeth Bartley, named for Elizabeth Báthory. It was implied that Bartley arranged the assassination of Archduke Franz Ferdinand of Austria in order to precipitate World War I. She resurrects Dracula, but she and her uncle are defeated by John and Eric. Castlevania (1999) and Castlevania: Legacy of Darkness take place in the mid-19th century. In these games, Dracula's return is accomplished through the unusual method of having him reincarnated as a child named Malus.

Set in 1830, Castlevania: Circle of the Moon explains how Dracula was defeated by vampire hunter Morris Baldwin a decade prior. At the start of the game, Dracula is resurrected by his disciple Camilla. The player assumes the role of Nathan Graves, a student of Morris Baldwin, who once again defeats the newly resurrected Dracula.

Castlevania: Harmony of Dissonance takes place in 1748. Simon's grandson Juste is the main character. He enters Castlevania to save his childhood friend Lydie Erlanger. Their friend Maxim Kischine resurrected Dracula in order to prove his worth as a vampire hunter and Dracula is defeated by Juste.

The prequel Castlevania: Lament of Innocence takes place in 1094. The game introduced Crusaders Leon Belmont and Mathias Cronqvist. In 1093, they returned from a campaign to find that Mathias' wife Elisabetha had died. A year later, Leon's fiancée Sara disappears. Mathias tells Leon that she was kidnapped by a vampire named Walter Bernhard, who lives in a castle in the Forest of Eternal Night. Leon forsakes his title and arms in order to venture into the castle and save Sara. He is given a weapon known as the Whip of Alchemy. Leon eventually rescues Sara, but she is already infected with the vampire's curse. She sacrifices her soul to imbue the Whip of Alchemy with the power to destroy Walter. Leon returns to the castle and defeats Walter. Mathias then appears and reveals that he orchestrated the entire scheme in order to gain possession of the Crimson Stone. Mathias blamed God for Elisabetha's death, and plans to revenge himself upon God by becoming immortal. He offers Leon the chance to join him in eternal life. Leon refuses. Disappointed, Mathias escapes, leaving Leon to battle his second in command, Death. Series producer Koji Igarashi has confirmed that Mathias eventually becomes Dracula.

Castlevania: Curse of Darkness is a sequel to Castlevania III, taking place in 1479. The main character is Hector, a "Devil Forgemaster" who served Dracula but left his service just prior to his defeat at the hands of Trevor. With his dying words, Dracula places a curse upon the land. Hector plans to live peacefully amongst humans, but his wife Rosalie is executed for witchcraft at the behest of fellow Forgemaster Isaac. Hector swears revenge upon Isaac, but this is a ploy; Isaac intends to use Hector as the vessel for Dracula's return. Hector defeats Isaac, who himself becomes the vessel. Hector then faces Dracula, defeats him, and used his powers to dispel the curse.

Castlevania: Aria of Sorrow takes place in 2035 and stars Soma Cruz, a high school exchange student who discovers he is the reincarnation of Dracula, who was permanently destroyed decades prior, and possesses the Count's ability to absorb the souls of monsters and assume their powers. Castlevania: Dawn of Sorrow is a sequel to Aria of Sorrow set one year later, with villains trying to revive Dracula by taking down Soma.

Castlevania: Portrait of Ruin is a sequel to Bloodlines set in 1944. The player takes control of Jonathan Morris, John Morris' son, and Charlotte Aulin. In this game, Dracula's castle is resurrected by vampire artist Brauner during World War II. At the end of this game, Dracula takes the unusual step of fighting alongside Death, before fusing with Death and morphing into a final, demonic form.

Castlevania: Order of Ecclesia is set in the 19th century and features a holy order named Ecclesia which had apparently created a power named Dominus with the ability to defeat Dracula. However, Dominus is actually constructed from Dracula's own power, and the Order made Dominus to break the seal on the casket imprisoning his soul, as their leader Barlowe believed Dracula's return was secretly mankind's greatest desire. Ecclesia's chief researcher Albus had stolen the Dominus glyph in an attempt to protect the main character, Shanoa, who had been raised as his younger sister, but became possessed by Dracula when he absorbed one part of the glyph. After Dracula's resurrection, Shanoa faces and defeats him.

=== Lords of Shadow series ===
Castlevania: Lords of Shadow stars Gabriel Belmont, Dracula's original human form. Gabriel is sent by the Brotherhood of Light to the Lake of Oblivion, where his deceased wife, Marie, tells him that Spirits who founded the Brotherhood said that the Lords of Shadow's power will save the world. Gabriel meets a man from the Brotherhood called Zobek, who states that a prophecy has been kept a secret by a select few, which tells of a pure-hearted warrior who will claim the Lords of Shadow's power to overcome evil. In the climax, Zobek discloses he used the Devil Mask on Gabriel to kill Marie and that all he needed was for Gabriel to restore the power of the Spirits to avoid suspicion from them. Satan emerges and takes the God Mask, revealing himself as the mastermind who gave Zobek his powers so that Satan could have revenge on God and return to the Heavens. Gabriel confronts Satan and defeats him, releasing souls of the deceased from limbo. Gabriel discovers the God Mask cannot bring Marie back and that it only allows him to see through God's eyes. The epilogue reveals that in modern times Gabriel has become a vampire who identifies himself by saying "Eu sunt Dracul" in Romanian which can roughly translate to "I am the Dragon", "I am the Devil" or more popularly "I am Dracula". Zobek finds Dracula hiding in a ruined church and tries to win his support against the acolytes of Satan. Zobek tells him he will free him of his immortality if he helps him. It is explained through the game's two DLC Packages Reverie and Resurrection that after the defeat of the Lords of Shadow, a powerful demon they locked away called the Forgotten One had begun to break free. In order to enter the demon's prison dimension Gabriel, somewhat reluctantly allowed himself to be turned into a vampire followed by defeating the demon by absorbing its power and killing it in a single blow, completely sacrificing his humanity in the process. During Resurrection, the Forgotten One aspires to destroy the humans' world, but he is defeated by Gabriel who claims his power for himself. Corrupted by the Forgotten One's power, Gabriel destroys his Combat Cross and leaves through the portal.

In Mirror of Fate Gabriel returns as Dracula. His goal is to destroy the Brotherhood of Light in order to "remake" the world, as he believes the Brotherhood is evil and corrupt, as the Brotherhood manipulated him and allowed his wife to be killed when they could have prevented it. The brotherhood believed Gabriel was the chosen one, and would redeem mankind. The Brotherhood however knew of his descent into darkness so they raised his son, Trevor, kept from him in secret by Marie, as a member of the brotherhood in order to combat his father. Later Trevor tracks down his father and attempt to avenge the death of his mother. While dying, Trevor looks into the Mirror of Fate and sees what actually happened to Gabriel. After looking into the mirror and learning the truth, Dracula panics and desperately attempts to revive him by giving him his own blood. After it does not seem to work, he puts Trevor in a coffin with the name Alucard as he never knew his son's true name. Dracula faces his son, now revived, and his grandson Simon. The end of the battle sees him disappear and Alucard says that is not how a vampire is supposed to die.

In Lords of Shadow 2, Dracula faces several people opposing him until seeing his son again. The story then moves to modern times in the first Lords of Shadow cliffhanger where a weakened Dracula feeds on a family to recover his health. He is warned by Zobek of the return of Satan, who until then was deterred from doing so by Dracula himself. Zobek offers him his old weapon, the Vampire Killer, the only relic capable of ending his cursed existence, in exchange for him vanquishing the "acolytes" trying to bring Satan back. The key to him regaining his power lies in his castle, which the cursed blood that kept it alive for centuries attempts to deter Dracula of his quest. Throughout his journey, Dracula is aided by various allies, including Zobek's bodyguard and specters of his deceased wife Marie and a younger Trevor. He also encounters the Brotherhood of Light and its current leader, Victor Belmont. After destroying two of the acolytes and tracked down the third, Dracula is confronted by Zobek's bodyguard, Alucard in disguise. It is revealed that centuries ago, Alucard had come to Dracula with a plan to destroy both Zobek and Satan, using his sword, the Crissaegrim, on him to induce a deep sleep and thus setting the current events into motion. Zobek discovers their treachery and confronts them both. Dracula kills him just as the third acolyte summons Satan. Dracula and Alucard are able to kill the beast, only for Satan to possess the latter, forcing father and son to battle. Dracula kills Satan once and for all while saving his son. Dracula then destroys the Mirror of Fate and leaves the streets with his son.

=== In other media ===
Dracula appears as a recurring villain in the 1989 animated series Captain N: The Game Master. He is never referred to by name, only being addressed as "The Count". He is depicted as a lanky vampire in a yellow suit, later changed to black and blue in the show's third season. He seeks to terrorize the land of Castlevania, but is typically thwarted by Simon Belmont and the N Team. He has a strained relationship with his teenage son Alucard. Dracula appears as a boss in Super Smash Bros. Ultimate. He also appears in the game's Adventure Mode: World of Light as the boss at the end of a Castlevania-themed map. Dracula, alongside Trevor Belmont, were added to Dead by Daylight in August 2024 with the release of the Castlevania expansion.

Dracula appears as a central character in the 2017 animated series Castlevania, voiced by Scottish actor Graham McTavish. The series adapts the events of Castlevania III: Dracula's Curse and reveals how Dracula first comes to meet his human wife, Lisa, and later how her unjust execution drives him to wage extinction on mankind. He is defeated at the end of season two by the combined efforts of Trevor Belmont, Sypha Belnades, and his son Alucard. Following his death, a number of individuals work to bring about Dracula's resurrection, including Death, who very nearly succeeds in resurrecting Dracula along with Lisa in the body of a Rebis. Though Trevor Belmont destroys both the Rebis and Death, through unexplained means, Dracula and Lisa return to life. The two set out to build a new life for themselves, contemplating moving to Whitby and resolving to not tell Alucard that they are alive for the time being, feeling that he needs closure.

== Reception ==
Dracula has become one of gaming's most popular villains based on his role in the franchise. He was listed as the third top villain of 2006 by Game Informer. He was also listed as the number 7 most recurring video game character who has died repeatedly and been resurrected. He is ranked third on EGM's Top Ten Badass Undead. GameDaily ranked him number sixteen in their "Top 25 Evil Masterminds of All Time" article, noting his persistence. His persistence resulted in him being ranked amongst the most persistent video game villains of all time by GameDaily. IGN listed him eight in their "Top 10 Most Memorable Villains" article, noting his grudge against the Belmonts and calling him "the Timex of villains". In a later article, they listed him as one of their favorite monsters in video gaming, stating a preference for the Castlevania representation of Dracula over others due to him having "a sense of fashion and style that few other versions possess." They would also list him as the 23rd best video game villain, calling him one of the most prolific video game villains ever. GamesRadar listed him first on their list of video game villains who never stay dead, stating that he has died more than any other video game villain ever and that like The Legend of Zelda antagonist Ganon, he never learns from his previous battles. According to Nintendo Power, the worst cover for a Nintendo Power was one depicting Simon Belmont holding the severed head of Dracula. It is considered the worst cover because hundreds of parents called in to complain about the goriness of the cover. It was reported in the complaints that children suffered nightmares resulting from the image. The banter between Dracula and Richter Belmont in Symphony of the Night has often been mocked by fans for the deliveries of the lines and mistranslations.

GamesRadar listed Gabriel seventh in their "Top 7... fallen heroes that became awesome villains", mentioning how his personality changed in the franchise when becoming a vampire, but still found his backstory ridiculously tragic. In retrospect, GameSpot noted Gabriel's story did not feel like a Castlevania game despite visual similarities in terms of weapons and areas he explored. The lack of Dracula in the first Lords of Shadow bothered gamers until the post-credit scene where Gabriel is revealed to be Dracula himself. While the Gabriel from Mirror of Fate has become a menace to mankind, GameSpot saw his previews from Lords of Shadow 2 as potential for redemption.However, GameSpot criticized Dracula's and Alucard's final showdown in Lords of Shadow 2 as the both father and son fail to conquer their inner demons. Rather than accomplish his own desire of ending his life, Dracula instead destroys the Mirror of Fate, leaving the story on a cliffhanger. Comic Book Resources praised the handling of and Dracula and Alucard's characterizations in the Lords of Shadow series for how he handles his relationship with his son even if the ending might come across as too tragic as both father and son appeared to hate their own nature and wanted to end the Belmont bloodline with their own lives. The Escapist criticized Dracula's characterization for coming to close to Kratos from God of War due to his angry personality and how weak he is portrayed sometimes in contrast to his previous incarnations as he now lacked the powers of having an army of his own. The fact that Dracula is portrayed in a heroic light also bothered the writer for making the writer comes up with worse characters to have Dracula be the hero, most notably Satan. GameSpot further commented on Gabriel's characterization, claiming that while he possesses humanity in his debut, his transformation into Dracula and new actions will wonder gamers even if he is fighting for the sake of ending his own immortality.

For the animated Castlevania series, Anime News Network writer Zac Bertschy noted that one of its charms was that in contrast to many vampire series, Dracula was not the original real villain but instead the Church that killed his wife which causes Dracula to become evil. Bertschy also highly praised McTavish for providing Dracula's voice as he "makes Dracula sound at once worldly and feral, aristocratic and satanic". The animated version of Alucard's characterization in Netflix's Castlevania series earned mixed responses, as he and his allies were overshadowed by Dracula's underlings, who were seen as more fleshed out cast members than Alucard. The Verge agreed in regards to Dracula's characterization, finding him as a "sympathetic character as opposed to cartoonish villain with no real motivation beyond an unjustified drive to be evil". Dave Trumbore of Collider found Dracula's thirst of revenge understandable despite the chaos he makes. Dan Seitz at Uproxx agreed but felt the series sidelined the character. In an analysis from the franchise, E. Charlotte Stevens from Birmingham City University claimed that noticed the character often shows signs of humanity when being surrounded by his family. IGN felt that the relationship between Alucard and his father was one of the best aspects of the second season due to the performance of their voice actors when they confront each other but suffer a mental breakdown upon acknowledging who are they facing. Anime News Network told the Netflix staff that Dracula's humanization in the series was better than the ones from other anti-villains like Magneto or Thanos, which executive producer Adi Shankar found as an accomplishment.
