= Sexy Parodius =

1996 arcade game by Konami

- Arcade flyer
- Developer: Konami
- Publisher: Konami
- Programmers: Akihiro Imamura; Shutaro Iida
- Artist: Takayoshi Sato
- Composer: Mayuko Kageshita
- Series: Parodius
- Platforms: Arcade, PlayStation, Sega Saturn
- Release: Arcade: JP: March 1996; PlayStation, Saturn: JP: 1 November 1996
- Genre: Horizontal-scrolling shooter
- Modes: Single player, multiplayer
- Arcade system: Konami GX

Sexy Parodius (Note: Japanese: セクシーパロディウス, Hepburn: Sekushī Parodiusu) is a 1996 horizontal-scrolling shooter arcade game developed by Konami. It is the fifth installment of the Parodius series. Like the rest of the series, it is a parody of the Gradius series and other Konami games. As implied in the title, the game contains sexual elements.

== Plot ==
Takosuke and Pentarou recruit various characters for an agency whose main goal is riches, power, and world peace. The agency helps people who have problems. In addition to Vic Viper and Lord British, Hikaru and Akane, Michael and Gabriel, Koitsu and Aitsu, and Mambo and Samba, Ivan and Toby, two rockhopper penguins, Option and Multiple, sentient versions of Vic Viper and Lord British's drones, Ace from TwinBee Yahho!, who pilots the Shooting Star, and an unnamed woman who pilots the Black Viper, a spacecraft that originates in the game, also get recruited.

After completing (or not completing) all the missions, Takosuke steals the profits of the agency for himself and runs away, with the characters chasing him. Depending on how the player finishes the final level, there are two endings. The bad ending sees Takosuke escape with the money and have fun with various women while the player characters look depressed. The good ending has Takosuke get crushed to death by the buttocks of a giant naked woman named Kaori, which the player characters celebrate.

== Gameplay ==
Screenshot of Sexy Parodius

The gameplay in Sexy Parodius is similar to the rest of the series, but the player must complete a special mission for each stage. These missions range from collecting a certain amount of coins in a stage to destroying a certain object or enemies. Whether or not the player completes the mission determines whether the player can continue to the next stage or what the next stage will be. Clearing all missions unlocks a special stage. Unlike the past versions, home ports of the game (except the PSP version) have cooperative multiplayer intact. The game continues to play even when one player is choosing a character upon continuing.

In a 2-player game, when certain characters are near enough, a third shot appears between them which can be purple shots that swirl all over the screen, hearts that home in on enemies, or rockets that shoot straight ahead. This feature was first seen on Konami's arcade game, Lightning Fighters.

It also contains sexual level and enemy designs, such as a boss character whose clothes are removed throughout the boss fight and who strikes erotic poses. Many level bosses are women in various erotic costumes (such as the "bunny costume" modeled on Playboy Bunnies) or various states of undress.

== Development and release ==
Sexy Parodius features the song "Mayim Mayim". It was the first game that programmer Shutaro Iida worked on after joining Konami, after which he would work on Konami titles such as Aria of Sorrow and Dawn of Sorrow.

Sexy Parodius was ported to the Sega Saturn and PlayStation by Konami Computer Entertainment Tokyo and both versions were released on November 1, 1996, in Japan. These versions allow the Special Stage to be selected on the Title Screen after finishing the game with all conditions passed. They also come with unlimited continues (the game doesn't keep track of credits). The PlayStation version was also included in Parodius Portable (albeit with music from some stages replaced with other remixed classical songs) for the PlayStation Portable.

== Reception ==
Reception

Review scores
Publication	Score
Famitsu	6/10, 6/10, 6/10, 6/10 (SS); 6/10, 6/10, 6/10, 6/10 (PS)
Super GamePower	4.5/5(PS)
Intelligent Gamer	B-(PS)
Sega Saturn Magazine	8.0/10(SS)
Joypad	3/5(PS)
Mega Console	91/100(SS)
Mega Fun	74%(PS)

In Japan, Game Machine listed Sexy Parodius on their April 15, 1996 issue as being the sixth most popular game for that two-week period among arcades surveyed.

Intelligent Gamer gave it a B−.

Super GamePower gave it 4.5/5

Sega Saturn Magazine (JP) 8.0/10.

Joypad gave it 3/5.

Mega Fun gave it 74%.

Mega Console 91/100.
