= Castlevania: Harmony of Despair =

2010 video game

- Developer: Konami
- Publisher: Konami
- Director: Shutaro Iida
- Producer: Koji Igarashi
- Programmer: Takara Nakayama
- Artist: Ayami Kojima
- Composers: Yasuhiro Ichihashi; Tomoaki Hirono
- Series: Castlevania
- Platforms: Xbox 360; PlayStation 3
- Release: Xbox 360: WW: August 4, 2010; PlayStation 3: NA: September 27, 2011; EU: October 12, 2011; JP: March 29, 2012
- Genre: Platform-adventure
- Modes: Single-player, multiplayer

Castlevania: Harmony of Despair (Note: Known in Japan as Akumajō Dracula: Harmony of Despair (悪魔城ドラキュラ ハーモニー オブ ディスペアー, Akumajō Dorakyura Hāmonī obu Disupeā; lit. Demon Castle Dracula: Harmony of Despair)) is a multiplayer-focused platform-adventure game in the Castlevania series, featuring an ensemble cast of characters from the 2-D Metroidvania era of games, developed and published by Konami for Xbox 360 in August 2010, and for PlayStation 3 in 2011.

== Gameplay ==
Castlevania: Harmony of Despair features cooperative gameplay somewhat similar to Castlevania: Portrait of Ruin.

Gameplay includes a co-op mode (the Xbox 360 release only allows for internet co-op, while the PlayStation 3 release supports local multiplayer) which plays like the "Boss Rush Mode" of previous 2D Castlevania games, but with several rooms and items to find, culminating in a boss to fight. It also includes a versus mode, with battle occurring between players. Some bosses are able to attack players on their way to the fight. The game features five playable characters, consisting of Alucard, Soma Cruz, Jonathan Morris, Shanoa and Charlotte Aulin, all from previous 2D Castlevania games.

All of the characters include eight palette swaps to accommodate players that wish to be the same character. The characters have their own signature attacks and skills to use in battle. An all-new map system allows real-time zooming in and out of the current stage, which will not stop gameplay and allow players to play with the map zoomed out.

Other features in the game include a grimoire placed in certain parts of levels, which is the only way to change items and equipment mid-game. Only one type of consumable item such as a potion can be equipped at a time, but it can be consumed at will. Some healing items have an area effect, so they can also be used to heal other players as well. The experience point system from most newer 2D Castlevania games was replaced by a character-specific leveling system. Some characters must find weapons and equipment in order to improve their character, while others must level up sub-weapons or collect spells/souls as a means of character growth. Alucard and Soma can equip most dropped weaponry, but Jonathan, Charlotte and Shanoa can only strengthen their main attack by upgrading sub-attacks, either by finding and using them or absorbing additional spells from monsters (Shanoa can also find a few rare weapons, unique to her only, to change her attack type and power).

== Development and release ==
Castlevania: Harmony of Despair was first leaked as an OFLCA Rating on May 27, 2010, then officially announced for Xbox Live Summer of Gaming 2010. Later in the year, the game was unveiled as a playable demo in the Konami booth at the E3 Convention of 2010.

Castlevania: Harmony of Despair was released worldwide on August 4, 2010 for the Xbox Live Arcade and September 27, 2011 for the PlayStation Network. On March 14, 2019, the Xbox 360 version was made backwards compatible for Xbox One.

All characters use designs by recurring Castlevania artist Ayami Kojima- Charlotte Aulin and Jonathan Morris were redesigned to fit the art direction, as they were the only characters in the game Kojima had not previously drawn.

=== Downloadable content ===
Additional stages and extra playable characters was added to the game as downloadable content (DLC).

- Chapter 7, entitled Beauty, Desire, Situation Dire, was released early October 2010 and is based on the Egyptian pyramid-themed "Sandy Grave" level from Portrait of Ruin featuring Astarte as the end-level boss.
- Chapter 8, The One Who is Many, was released on January 12, 2011 and is based on the underground area of Symphony of the Night featuring Legion as the end-level boss.
- Chapter 9, entitled Lord of Flies, was released on January 19, 2011 and is based on the beginning sections of Symphony of the Night featuring Beelzebub as the end-level boss.
- Chapter 10, Origins, was released on January 26, 2011 and recreates the map of the original 8-bit Castlevania, featuring all of the game's sub-bosses ending with the Count.
- Chapter 11, The Legend of Fuma, was released on February 2, 2011 and is based on the Famicom game Getsu Fūma Den.

Konami also released additional playable characters, with Yoko Belnades and Julius Belmont released in October 2010, and Maria Renard and Richter Belmont released on November 30, 2010. An 8-bit Simon Belmont was released on January 26, 2011. Getsu Fūma, from Getsu Fūma Den, was released on February 2, 2011. The PlayStation Network release also contains Chapter 7, Julius Belmont and Yoko Belnades included with the full game, along with the exclusive feature that allows local multiplayer for up to four players. Konami released two music packs featuring alternative stage music as well as character picture packs and Xbox Live dashboard themes.

== Reception ==
Reception

Aggregate score
Aggregator	Score
Metacritic	68/100 (PS3); 67/100 (X360)

Review scores
Publication	Score
Edge	8/10
Eurogamer	4/10
GameSpot	7.5/10
GameTrailers	7.8/10
IGN	7.5/10
Official Xbox Magazine (UK)	7/10

Harmony of Despair was met with mixed reception. Scoring it a 7.5, GameSpot praised the multiplayer saying it was "the best way to experience this new Castlevania, and it's the optimal way to experience what may be a new and fun potential direction for the series to take." GameTrailers commented on the exploration in comparison to previous games, mentioning that "the thrill of discovery is gone, and in its place is the compulsive drive to acquire loot. Oddly enough, it works, and it can actually be a lot of fun with friends."

Resolution Magazine was disappointed with its "somewhat fiddly gameplay" and for only having six different stages. They concluded their review with a score of 6/10. Destructoid also awarded the game 6/10, stating that "ultimately it feels like Castlevania Lite – a stripped down version of a real Castlevania game with none of the depth or clever design." Eurogamer criticised the multiplayer, mentioning that "Harmony of Despair strips Castlevania down to its lowest common denominator in order to make multiplayer function, rather than reinventing the game to make multiplayer thrive". It was given a final rating of 4/10.

Game Informer's Tim Turi criticized the game's lack of "progression and weapon variety" but appreciated its ambition and cooperative gameplay.

Time Extension placed Harmony of Despair 25th on its list of ranked Castlevania games: "While the ability to play with friends is fun, it never really gets close to capturing that classic Castlevania 'feel', and ends up being more of an experiment with Monster Hunter-style team-based mechanics."
