= Shutaro Iida =

Japanese video game programmer (1973–2026)

- 飯田 周太郎
- Born: 11 March 1973
- Died: 10 February 2026 (aged 52)
- Occupations: Game programmer, game director
- Employer: Konami (1996–2015)
- Known for: Castlevania series; Bloodstained series

Shutaro Iida (Japanese: 飯田 周太郎; 11 March 1973 – 10 February 2026) was a Japanese video game programmer.

== Life and career ==
Shutaro Iida worked at Konami from 1996 to 2015, mainly as a programmer in various areas. He notably worked on Castlevania: Aria of Sorrow, Castlevania: Portrait of Ruin) and Bloodstained: Ritual of the Night.

Later on in his career, he has been working with 505 Games, Armature Studio, Inti Creates and ArtPlay.

Iida died of pancreatic cancer on 10 February 2026, at the age of 52.

== Ludography ==
Year	Title	Role
1996	Sexy Parodius	Programmer
1998	Twinbee RPG	Programmer
1999	Gungage	Programmer
2001	Shadow of Destiny	Event programmer
2003	Castlevania: Aria of Sorrow	Chief programmer
2003	Castlevania: Lament of Innocence	Enemy programmer
2005	Castlevania: Dawn of Sorrow	Chief programmer
2006	Castlevania: Portrait of Ruin	Chief programmer
2008	Time Hollow	Technical support
2008	Castlevania: Order of Ecclesia	Chief programmer
2010	Castlevania: Harmony of Despair	Director, level designer
2014	Metal Gear Solid V: Ground Zeroes	Lead enemy programmer
2015	Metal Gear Solid V: The Phantom Pain	Lead enemy programmer
2019	Bloodstained: Ritual of the Night	Director, game designer
