= Castlevania HoD =

Castlevania HoD may refer to:

- Castlevania: Harmony of Dissonance, released for the Game Boy Advance in 2002
- Castlevania: Harmony of Despair, released for Xbox 360 in 2010 and for PlayStation 3 in 2011
