= Castlevania: Portrait of Ruin =

2006 video game

- North American box art depicting the main protagonists Charlotte Aulin (left) and Jonathan Morris (center)
- Developer: Konami
- Publisher: Konami
- Director: Satoshi Kushibuchi
- Producer: Koji Igarashi
- Programmer: Shutaro Iida
- Writers: Koji Igarashi; Hiroto Yamaguchi; Shutaro Iida
- Composers: Michiru Yamane; Yuzo Koshiro
- Series: Castlevania
- Platform: Nintendo DS
- Release: JP: November 16, 2006; NA: December 5, 2006; EU: March 9, 2007; AU: March 22, 2007
- Genres: Action role-playing, Metroidvania
- Modes: Single-player, multiplayer

Castlevania: Portrait of Ruin (Note: Known in Japan as Akumajō Dracula Gyararī obu Rabirinsu (Japanese: 悪魔城ドラキュラ ギャラリー オブ ラビリンス; lit. 'Demon Castle Dracula: Gallery of Labyrinth')) is a 2006 action role-playing game developed and published by Konami for the Nintendo DS handheld system. The game is the first in the Castlevania series to feature a cooperative multiplayer gameplay mode and the first handheld entry to have English voice-overs, outside of its original Japanese release.

The game is a continuation of the events from Castlevania: Bloodlines, a 1994 Sega Genesis title. Set in Europe during World War II, the story follows Jonathan Morris, the son of John Morris from Castlevania: Bloodlines, and Charlotte Aulin as they attempt to stop a vampire from resurrecting Dracula. The game expands on the two character gameplay found in Castlevania: Dawn of Sorrow and adds new cooperative online functionality while foregoing much of the mechanics involving the Nintendo DS touch screen.

Portrait of Ruin received an overall positive critical response and several awards as one of the best Nintendo DS games. Critics praised the game's soundtrack, story, and cooperative mechanics, while some criticism was directed towards the gameplay. The game's two protagonists later appeared in the 2010 multiplayer focused title Castlevania: Harmony of Despair. In 2024, Portrait of Ruin was re-released as part of the multi-platform Castlevania Dominus Collection alongside Castlevania: Dawn of Sorrow, Castlevania: Order of Ecclesia, and Haunted Castle Revisited.

== Gameplay ==
The top screen displays the in-game map, which records the player's progress. In the bottom screen, the main characters Jonathan (right) and Charlotte (center) attack an enemy together.

Similar to previous Castlevania games, Portrait of Ruin is a 2D Metroidvania that features side-scrolling action with an emphasis on exploration and combat. Role-playing game elements like leveling character statistics and collecting equipment that augment those statistics are also present. The player traverses Dracula's castle with the end goal of defeating Dracula. Aside from the castle, the main protagonists—Jonathan Morris and Charlotte Aulin—explore other environments such as Egyptian-like deserts and London-like towns via painting-like portals dispersed throughout the castle. During the adventure, the heroes encounter 155 different enemies, which are kept track in a bestiary; many of which have appeared in previous Castlevania titles as standard monsters or bosses. As they progress, the duo learn new skills and acquire equipment and items that allow further exploration in the game.

One of the main gameplay features is the ability to freely switch between two characters, similar to the "Julius mode" from Castlevania: Dawn of Sorrow. Jonathan and Charlotte can combine their powers to perform a powerful attack together known as "Dual Crush". Their combined abilities are needed in certain parts in order to solve puzzles and progress through the story. For example, the player must have both characters board two motorcycles and dodge obstacles while alternating between the two characters. Like previous games in the series, Portrait of Ruin has more than one ending that is determined by the player's actions during the story. The "bad" ending involves Jonathan and Charlotte only preventing Dracula's resurrection and finishes as a game over. The other ending sees all the vampire antagonists defeated and is considered the game's canonical ending.

=== Game modes ===
Portrait of Ruin features four single player modes and a "Boss Rush Mode" that can be played with either one or two players. Initially, the main story is playable only with Jonathan and Charlotte. After obtaining the canonical ending, the player will unlock a prologue to the main story, "Sisters Mode", and additional stages in the Boss Rush Mode. Completing the game also gives the player the option to increase the difficulty, add level caps on new games, and start a game with all previously obtained items and skills. In Sisters Mode, the player controls Loretta and Stella Lecarde with the DS stylus rather than the traditional inputs. If the player meets additional requirements in the game, two other versions of the main story mode are made available: "Richter Mode" and "Old Axe Armor Mode". Richter Mode, which was previously in Castlevania: Symphony of the Night, allows the player to control Richter Belmont and Maria Renard from Castlevania: Rondo of Blood. In Old Axe Armor Mode, the player controls only the eponymous Old Axe Armor enemy without the ability to switch characters.

Boss Rush Mode is a time attack mode separate from the main story that features three stages. Although only one stage is initially available, two more become available after obtaining the canonical ending. Each stage is a series of rooms with a boss or collection of monsters that the player must defeat. Rewards are determined by how quickly a player completes each stage. Portrait of Ruin is the first game in the Castlevania franchise with cooperative multiplayer. (Note: The 2005 title Castlevania: Dawn of Sorrow features a competitive online multiplayer mode and is the first in the series to feature any type of multiplayer.) Players can interact through the Co-op mode or a Shop mode via either local wireless or Nintendo Wi-Fi Connection. The online cooperative mode allows two players to complete Boss Rushes together. The online shop allows players to sell their items to other players at reduced prices.

== Plot and setting ==
Portrait of Ruin takes place in the fictional universe of the Castlevania series. The series' premise is the conflict between the vampire hunters of the Belmont clan and the immortal vampire Dracula. The game is set in 1944 Europe during World War II, and its story unfolds in Dracula's castle. In addition to the castle, the main characters explore various paintings that have been constructed by the villain Brauner. The paintings act as portals to new areas that feature appearances distinct from the main castle.

=== Characters ===
The game features both returning characters from previous titles as well as those new to the series, such as the two main protagonists: Jonathan Morris and Charlotte Aulin. Jonathan wields the legendary whip, "Vampire Killer", which was passed down to him by his father, John Morris from Castlevania: Bloodlines. As he is not a direct descendant of the Belmont clan, he is unable to unlock the Vampire Killer's full power without the assistance of a member of the Lecarde family. Charlotte is a mage and distant descendant of the Belnades clan. Assisting Jonathan and Charlotte is a priest named Vincent Dorin, who acts as a merchant selling weapons, potions, and magic spells, as well as a ghost who introduces himself as "Wind" and provides the duo new skills and equipment after completing quests. Wind's identity is eventually revealed to be Eric Lecarde, who fought alongside John Morris to slay Dracula in Bloodlines.

Similar to other Castlevania games, the main villain is Dracula who serves as the game's final boss. Portrait of Ruin introduces three new vampires who have taken control of Dracula's castle. Leading them is Brauner, who recreated Dracula's castle using the souls of the dead from World War II in order to draw power from the castle to destroy humanity. During World War I, Brauner's daughters were killed, igniting a disdain towards humanity. He is able to construct paintings containing pocket dimensions that harness the castle's power for his own purposes. Brauner is joined by twin sisters Stella and Loretta. Although the two are vampires, they are Eric Lecarde's daughters who were turned into vampires by Brauner, who they believe is their father.

=== Story ===
Prior to the start of the game, the two sisters, Stella and Loretta, travel to Dracula's castle in search of their father, Eric Lecarde. After finding their father defeated in Brauner's lair, Brauner turns the sisters into vampires. At the beginning of the game, Jonathan and Charlotte encounter an enigmatic blue figure at the castle entrance. After the figure transforms into a humanoid male, he introduces himself as "Wind", who before his death, had cast a magical barrier to keep himself conscious within the castle. Shortly after, Jonathan and Charlotte find one of Brauner's magical portraits and travel into the world within to destroy the painting. Later, when entering the second portrait, they find the three vampires; Brauner laughs at the notion of reviving Dracula, as he has failed too many times to control humanity but concedes his power is too great to ignore. Both sisters desire to kill the two heroes, but Brauner sees Dracula's servant Death as a greater threat. While exploring the castle, the duo encounter Death, who then leaves to destroy Brauner and revive Dracula.

Jonathan and Charlotte encounter Stella, and after being defeated, she loses her locket while fleeing. Opening the locket, Charlotte finds a photo of the twins with Wind. When questioned, Wind confesses he is Eric Lecarde and that the twins are his children. When Jonathan and Charlotte reach the tower spire, they find Dracula's throne room sealed off and conclude that Brauner is delaying Dracula's revival to siphon his power. After searching the castle, Jonathan and Charlotte obtain the Sanctuary spell, a magical attack that dispels curses and allows the dead to rest in peace. During the battle with the twins, Charlotte cures the sisters of their vampirism, after which they regain their identities. The twins subsequently perform a ritual that allows Jonathan to utilize the Vampire Killer whip's full power. Stella and Loretta then grant access to a portrait leading to Brauner's studio.

The two heroes confront Brauner and defeat him. However, Death swoops in and kills Brauner, which breaks the seal to the Throne Room. Jonathan and Charlotte then go to battle with Dracula. Before they can engage Dracula, Death enters the room to aid Dracula. During the battle, Death and Dracula merge into a more powerful form, but they are eventually defeated by Jonathan and Charlotte. Afterward, everyone flees the castle and watch it collapse from a distance. Later, the twins, Jonathan, and Charlotte are visited in the fields outside by Eric's ghost, who advises his daughters and thanks Charlotte and Jonathan for destroying the curse before his spirit finally fades from existence.

== Development ==
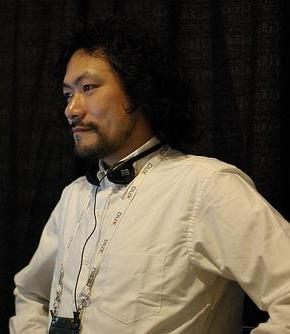
Longtime Castlevania developer Koji Igarashi (shown in 2007) led Portrait of Ruin's development team, aiming to expand on several aspects of their previous Nintendo DS title.

Portrait of Ruin was published by Konami and developed by the same team that created Castlevania: Dawn of Sorrow. The development team was led by producer Koji Igarashi, who had been a part of the series' development since Castlevania: Symphony of the Night. The team also included Shutaro Iida as a programmer. To create the game in a shorter development cycle, members from the group that created Castlevania: Circle of the Moon were added to this team. All together, Portrait of Ruin's development team consisted of around 20 members. The planning and production phases of development took approximately 16 months.

After the success of Dawn of Sorrow on the Nintendo DS, Igarashi decided to continue developing for the handheld console as standard console development required more time. Furthermore, he believed that the Nintendo DS was well suited for 2D games. As a fan of 2D games and pixel art, the producer wanted to continue creating such games in order to help preserve the style. Igarashi developed the game exclusively for the Nintendo DS as he was convinced that home console and PlayStation Portable owners only bought 3D games at the time.

For Portrait of Ruin, Igarashi aimed to create something different as a challenge. The team selected the story's hero early in production. As the game was to be released as part of the series' 20th anniversary, Igarashi wanted the hero to use the Vampire Killer whip. Because the developers wanted the whip to be an ultimate weapon too powerful and legendary for the player to use, they believed that a character outside the Belmont family was the best choice. After deciding to use Jonathan Morris, the team felt that a World War II setting made sense. While previous Castlevania games included musical references in the titles, the team decided to branch out to other forms of art—specifically paintings—to incorporate as a theme for this game. Since the series takes place inside Dracula's castle in every title, the designers had grown weary of creating indoor stages and elected to incorporate outdoor settings, which resulted in the stages within Brauner's paintings.

The team aimed to improve the visuals from the previous DS game by upgrading the game engine's graphics to display more characters and effects on the screen. In addition to more onscreen characters, the team included large multi-jointed enemies. The anime style of artwork was retained from Dawn of Sorrow, which Igarashi had switched to in the previous title to appeal more to the younger demographics of the Nintendo handheld systems. Although long-time fans expressed disappointment at the departure from Ayami Kojima's art style, Igarashi decided to retain the anime-style for Portrait of Ruin in order to attract new users to the series. The team, however, decided to tone down the style's vividness to make the characters more "adult-looking" in order to appeal to both younger and older audiences. Konami created the game's opening movie first, and afterward, used the movie as a reference to create the packaging materials.

=== Gameplay design ===
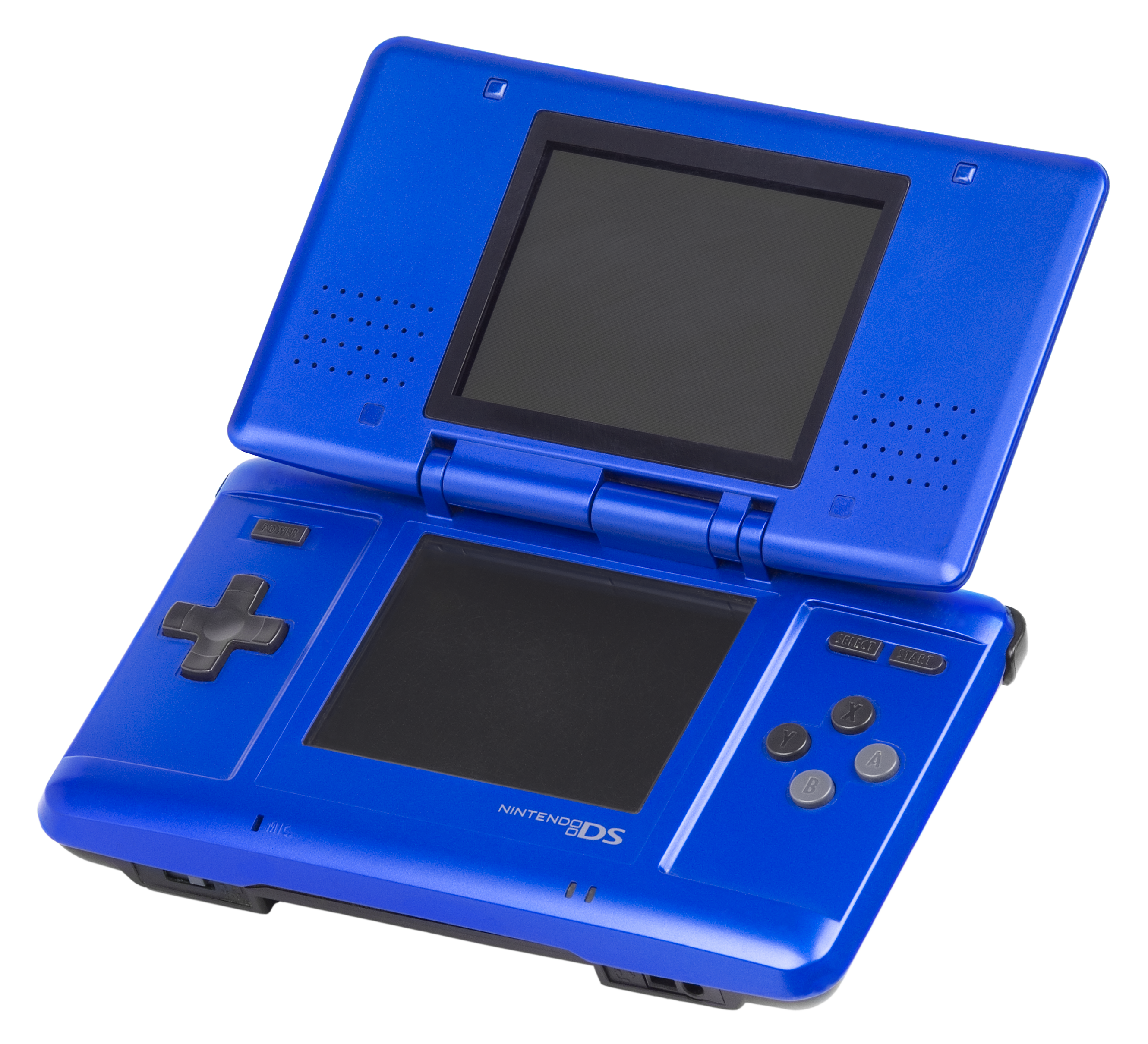
Portrait of Ruin was developed exclusively for the Nintendo DS to quickly develop a 2D game and to utilize of the handheld system's online capabilities.

Portrait of Ruin runs on an upgraded version of Dawn of Sorrow's game engine. While the producer liked how the previous DS title's Tactical Soul system gave meaning to defeating all enemy types, he felt that it overshadowed the items in the game. As a result, the developers implemented quests that require defeating a variety of enemies to complete. Because Dawn of Sorrow was developed around the handheld console's launch, Igarashi felt pressured to feature touch controls. In retrospect, however, he noted that some touch screen aspects of Dawn of Sorrow's gameplay broke the game's action rhythm, specifically drawing magic seals and breaking blocks with the DS stylus. As a result, the team restricted the touch screen functions to primarily menus in order to focus on the action gameplay.

The two player gameplay was an homage to Castlevania III: Dracula's Curse, which is both Igarashi and Iida's favorite Castlevania game. In order to emphasize the two player combat, the developers included simultaneous joint attacks as well as the ability to switch between characters. Because the player has two characters, Igarashi felt they should face more enemies and aimed to push the console's hardware limits in order to facilitate more characters and action onscreen.

To create something different for the series, the producer wanted to utilize the Nintendo DS's integrated Nintendo WiFi Connection feature. He felt that Nintendo had created a solid online infrastructure for the handheld console and that because many other developers had utilized it already, it was a necessity for mass appeal. Because the online capabilities were new to the team, however, Igarashi considered this part of production very challenging.

=== Audio ===
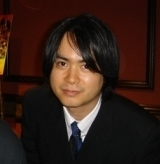
Composer Yuzo Koshiro (shown in 2006) was recruited to the team based on his expertise working with less powerful audio hardware.

Michiru Yamane returned to compose the music, with additional songs by Yuzo Koshiro. Other development staff coded the composed music to play on the system's sound hardware. Yamane wanted to try new tunes for the game and integrated more "pop" sound into the music as well as remixes of classic Castlevania songs. Igarashi had considered approaching Koshiro to compose Castlevania music for a while because he felt that Koshiro was talented at creating "fantastic" sound on weaker audio hardware. After the 2005 title Castlevania: Curse of Darkness, Yamane expressed that it was becoming difficult to create original ideas for the series. Igarashi saw this as an opportunity to bring in Koshiro in order to stimulate Yamane's creativity. The music tracks are accessible in a "Sound Mode" that is unlocked after defeating Dracula.

Portrait of Ruin features English voice-overs for portions of the game, a first for the handheld games. The original Japanese dialog is included in the North American release as an easter egg. The game's voice cast consists of seven Japanese and seven English voice actors for the respective versions of dialogue. The Japanese voice director was Sumiko Shindo, whereas the English voice director was Crispin Freeman. Takahiro Sakurai voiced Jonathan Morris for the Japanese dialog, and Yumi Kakazu voiced Charlotte Aulin. Liam O'Brien and Stephanie Sheh provided the English voices for the main characters, Jonathan and Charlotte, respectively. The antagonist Brauner is voiced by Hisao Egawa in the Japanese release, while American voice actor Jamieson Price performed the English dialog. Norio Wakamoto and Douglas Rye voiced Dracula in the respective Japanese and North American releases. Eric Lecarde's voice actors are Kohei Fukuhara and David Vincent in Japanese and English, respectively.

Voice cast and staff for Castlevania: Portrait of Ruin
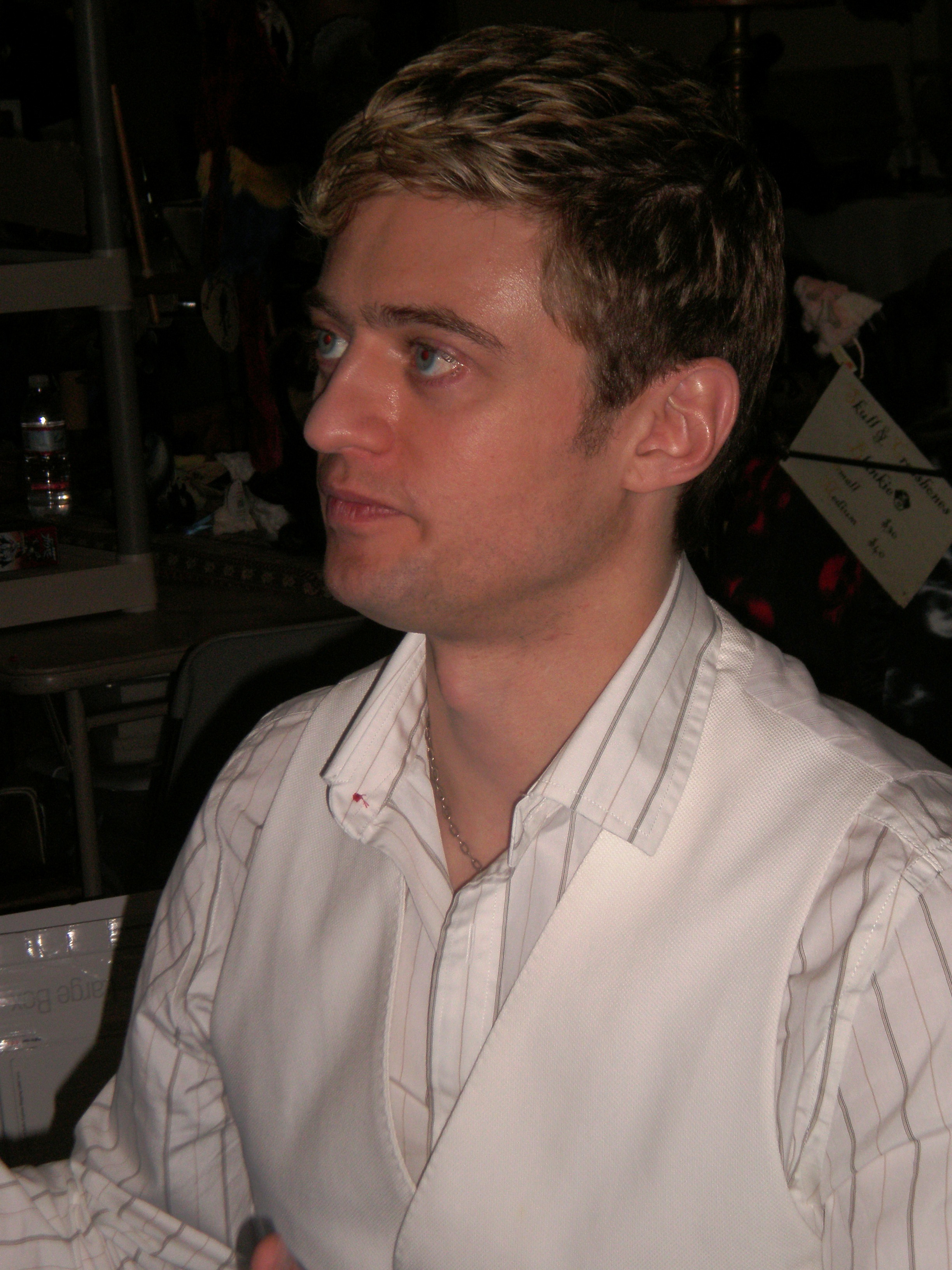
Crispin Freeman (shown in 2009), English language voice director

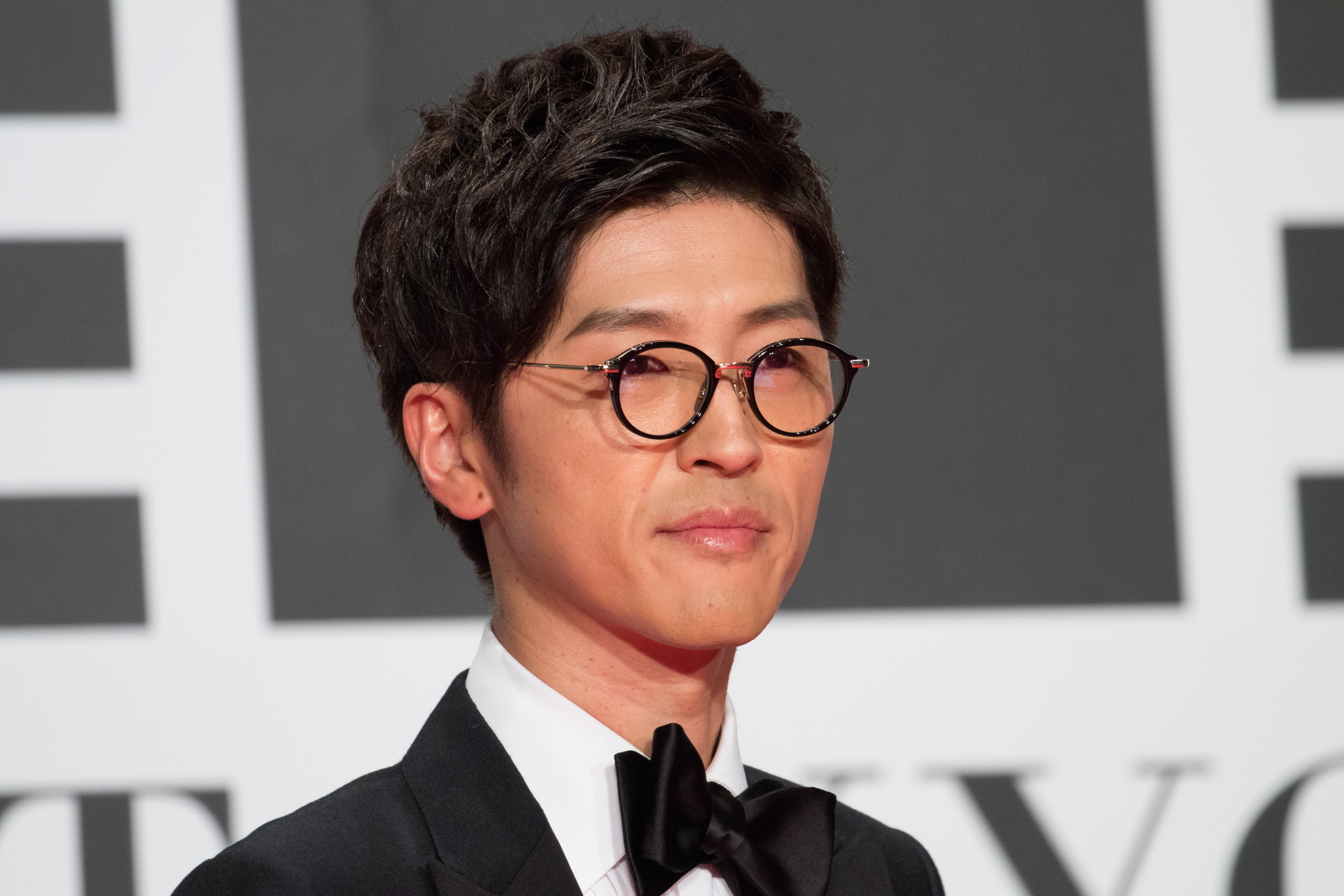
Takahiro Sakurai (shown in 2016), Japanese voice of Jonathan Morris

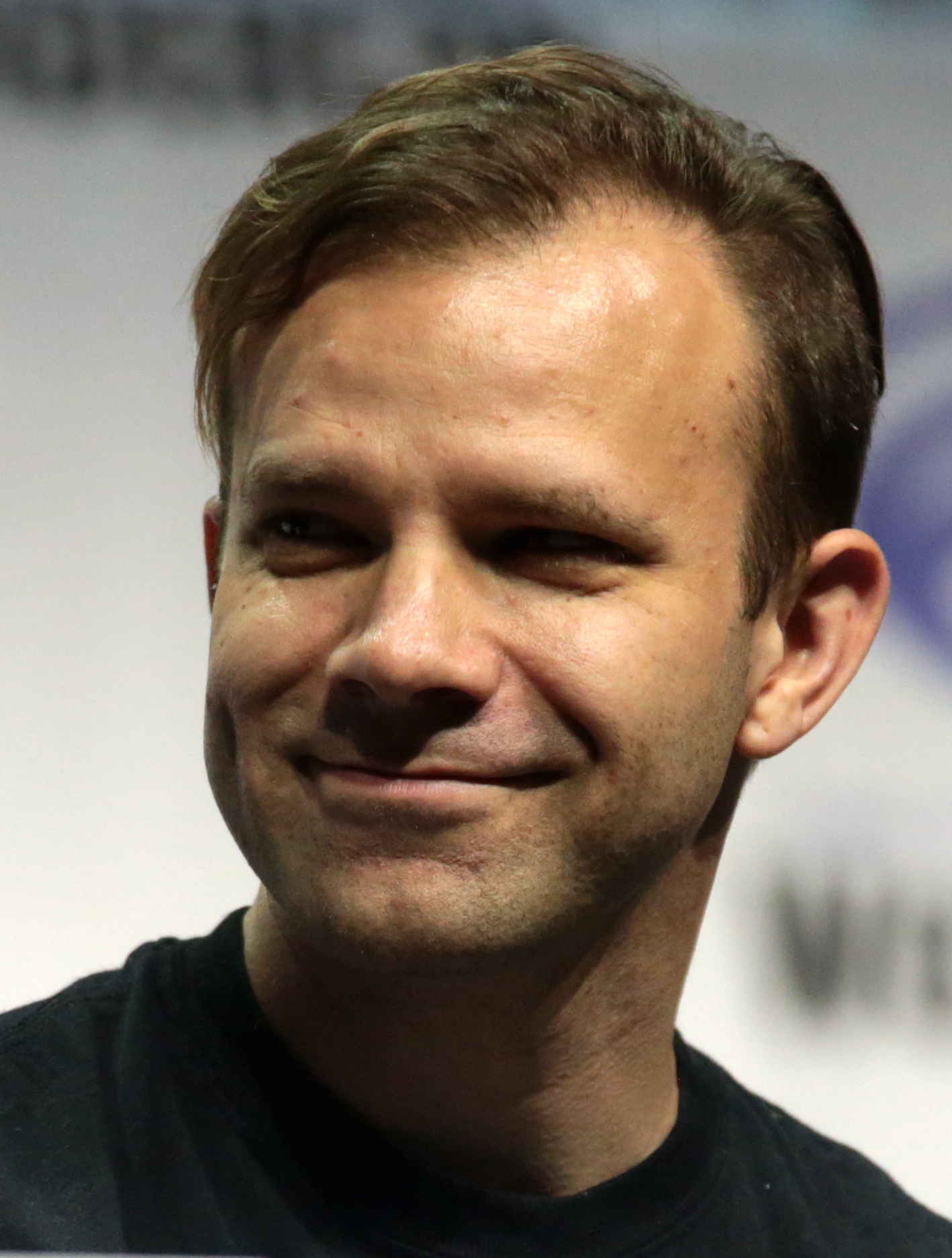
Liam O'Brien (shown in 2017), English voice of Jonathan Morris

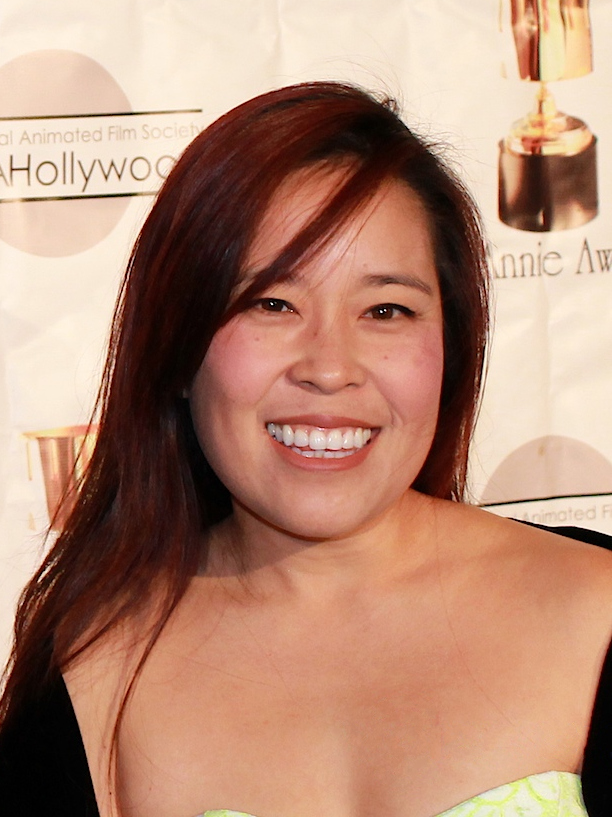
Stephanie Sheh (shown in 2014), English voice of Charlotte Aulin

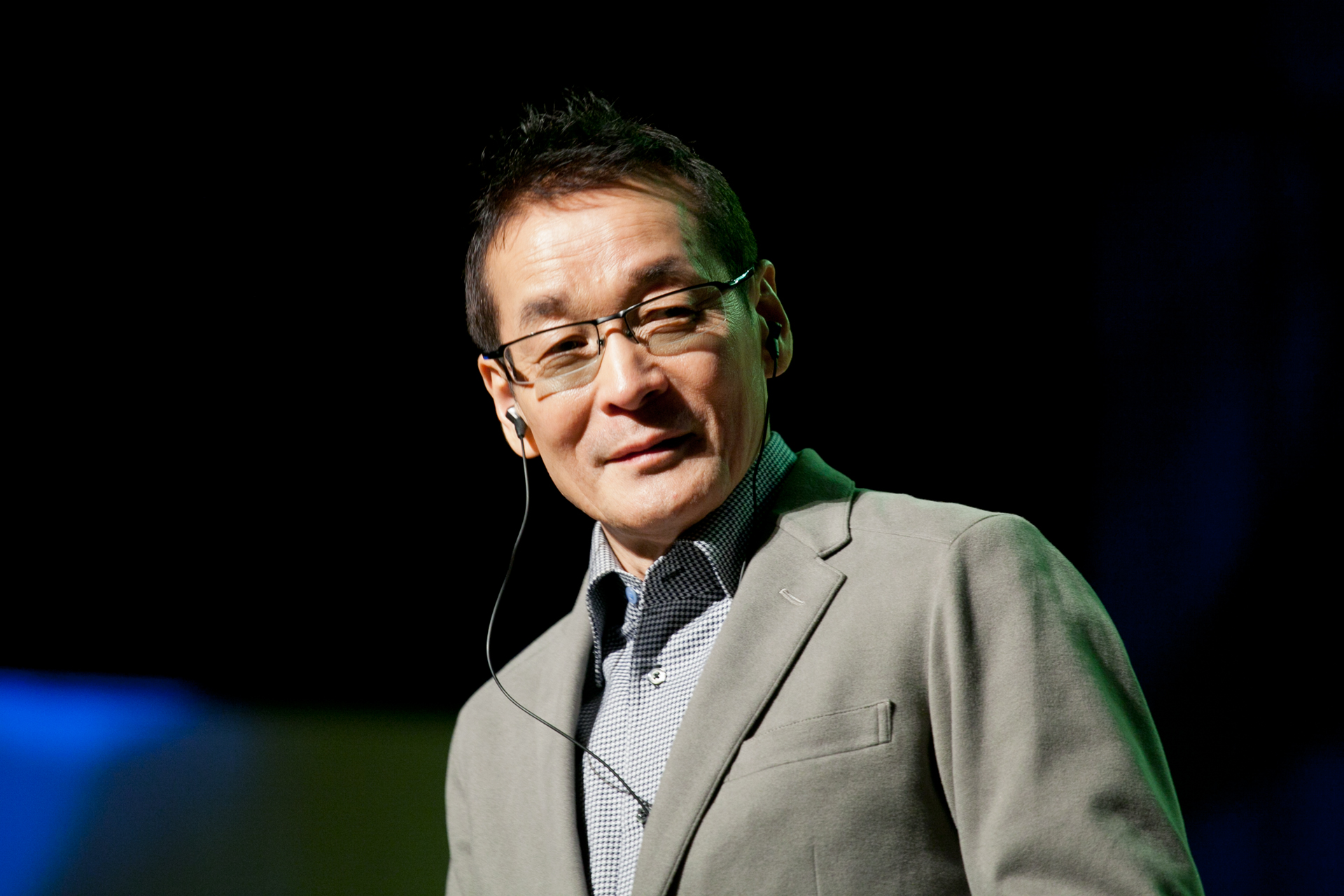
Norio Wakamoto (shown in 2013), Japanese voice of Brauner

David Vincent (shown in 2012), English voice of Eric Lecarde

== Marketing and release ==
Nintendo announced a new Castlevania for the DS on October 5, 2005. Details of the game were not released until April 21, 2006, when Konami revealed the game's title and its World War II setting. Further information was publicized at various trade shows and conventions leading up to the game's release to stores. Konami revealed the game trailer on May 9, 2006, at its official E3 press conference. The next day of the trade event, the gaming press was able to play a game demo and learned more about the two character gameplay. Afterward, the publisher filed the English title with the United States Patent and Trademark Office on May 17, 2006. More information concerning online gameplay was released a few months later at the 2006 San Diego Comic-Con but details regarding implementation were still unconfirmed. At the 2006 Games Convention in Germany, Konami presented an updated version of Portrait of Ruin to the gaming press. In August, ahead of the Tokyo Game Show, Konami announced the game's Japanese release date and title. The next month at the 2006 Tokyo Game Show in Japan, Igarashi confirmed details about the WiFi modes, stating that Portrait of Ruin would have cooperative time attack and online shop modes.

To celebrate the series' 20th anniversary, Konami released an anniversary pre-order bundle.

Several pieces of Castlevania: Portrait of Ruin merchandise were released along with the game. Konami released an official strategy guide in Japan, whereas BradyGames released the official guide in North America. In celebration of the series' 20th anniversary, customers who pre-ordered Portrait of Ruin received a free "20th Anniversary Pre-order Bundle". The bundle includes a variety of Castlevania products contained in cardboard sleeve with a plastic seal of the Castlevania logo: a soundtrack CD of songs from the series, a series timeline poster featuring significant characters and in-game events, an art book featuring artwork throughout the series, a small DS game case designed to hold both Dawn of Sorrow and Portrait of Ruin cartridges, and an extendable stylus. Later in March 2007, Konami released the game's soundtrack on a two CD set titled Akumajō Dracula Gyararī obu Rabirinsu Original Soundtrack (悪魔城ドラキュラ ギャラリー オブ ラビリンス Original Soundtrack; lit. 'Demon Castle Dracula: Gallery of Labyrinth Original Soundtrack').

== Reception ==
Reception

Aggregate scores
Aggregator	Score
GameRankings	85%
Metacritic	85/100

Review scores
Publication	Score
Eurogamer	7/10
Game Informer	9/10
GameSpot	8.3/10
IGN	8.9/10
Nintendo Life	7/10
Nintendo World Report	9/10
Yahoo! Games	4.5/5

Awards
Publication	Award
1UP.com	Best DS Game of E3 (2006)
IGN	Best DS Original Score (2006)
IGN	DS Game of the Month (December 2006)
Game Informer	Handheld Game of the Month (January 2007)

Prior to its release, previews for Portrait of Ruin expressed anticipation and reviewed the demonstrations at trade shows positively. Writing for 1UP.com, Jeremy Parish called the two-character gameplay "intriguing" and praised Yamane's return as composer. He further expressed excitement at several changes such as the removal of Dawn of Sorrow's touchscreen gimmicks, the possibility of cooperative multiplayer and the inclusion of side-quests. IGN writer Nix lauded the visuals of the playable demonstration at the E3 trade show, calling it the "most gorgeous 2D Castlevania ever". While he noted that Konami was still balancing and fine-tuning the gameplay, he expressed faith that the final product would please fans. After playing the updated demonstration in August 2006, Craig Harris of IGN praised the improvements and polish to the gameplay since E3. Staff from German magazine Mobile Gamer also praised the demo, commenting that the game's innovations and high quality will please current fans and likely attract new ones. After playing the Boss Rush mode with Igarashi at the Tokyo Game Show, Play magazine writers Nick Des Barres and Dai Kohama described it as "a lot of fun". After its release, the game reached twelve on Amazon's Top Sales list of games for March-April of 2007.

Portrait of Ruin received "generally favorable reviews" from critics, according to review aggregator Metacritic. The overall gameplay was received generally positively, with many drawing comparisons to Dawn of Sorrow. A reviewer for GamePro magazine lauded Portrait of Ruin for introducing new elements while retaining the enjoyable aspects from past titles, citing the new protagonists and antagonists as well as the online multiplayer options. They praised Konami for releasing such a game for the series' 20th anniversary rather than an "underwhelming remake or compilation". In rating the game in four categories related to audiovisuals and gameplay, the reviewer scored Portrait of Ruin 4.5 out of 5 across the board. Eurogamer's Tom Bramwell compared the game negatively to Dawn of Sorrow, commenting that the exploration is more linear in Portrait of Ruin. While acknowledging the extra variety the two-character gameplay provided, he described it as awkward during puzzle solving and complicated during challenging scenarios. However, Bramwell noted that Portrait of Ruin made several improvements over its predecessor—the removal of the magic seal, the visuals, and the online modes—and that its target audience would likely enjoy the game.

Writing for Yahoo! Games, Justin Leeper praised the two character gameplay for adding variety into the series, describing it as "intriguing and intuitive". Additionally, he lauded the addition of online co-op play, calling it "natural" and "flawless". Leeper noted that boss battles had become more challenging but considered it a positive because the necessary level grinding was enjoyable thanks in part to the quest system. He further appreciated the removal of "touchscreen gimmicks" and called the game "addictive". Conversely, Leeper criticized the game's length and the heroes' dialogue, calling them a little short and "whiny", respectively. Rob Burman of IGN UK also compared the game to its DS predecessor. While he commented that Portrait of Ruin's sense of exploration felt more linear, Burman wrote that the refined gameplay and "epic" boss fights make up for that shortcoming. He further noted that although some level grinding can become tedious, overall the game is an enjoyable experience. Greg Mueller of GameSpot called it a great game for preserving the best aspects of the series while successfully introducing changes. He complimented the two-character gameplay, noting that it is "remarkably easy and intuitive to control two characters at once." The reviewer, however, noted that some parts of the game aren't well suited for the team dynamic. Mueller also praised the audiovisuals, describing the overall look of the whole game as "great" and the audio as "uniformly excellent". Game Informer mentioned the two character play was "done before, but Portrait of Ruin's system is particularly smooth in execution."

Many reviewers noted the quality of Portrait of Ruin's audio. GameSpot's Mueller praised all aspects of the audio. He called the music "excellent" and "enjoyable", commenting that the quality was on par with previous titles. Additionally, Mueller complimented the sound effects as well as the voice acting, noting that all the voices sound great while portraying individual personalities. Game Informer called the audio a high point of the game, though complained about Charlotte always shouting the name of her attack. Rob Burman of IGN UK noted that vocals were sparse but nonetheless praised the game's score as "dramatic". IGN staff lauded the diversity of the music, noting that the styles ranged from "hauntingly morose to almost jovially up-tempo". They also considered the inclusion of the series soundtrack CD in the pre-order bonus as a positive. David Trammel of Nintendo World Report also praised all aspects of the audio, calling the sound effects and voice samples "superb". While he wrote that fans would be pleased with the music, Trammel commented that it was too "subtle and atmospheric" for the series. In his review on Nintendo Life, Damien McFarren described the audio as "well-rounded" and praised the tracks composed by Koshiro. McFarren called the soundtrack "stunning", comparing it favorably to Symphony of the Night's music.

Several gaming publications bestowed Portrait of Ruin awards and distinctions as one of the best on the system. 1UP.com staff listed Portrait of Ruin as the "Best DS Game" and a runner up for "Best Action Game" in their "Best of E3 2006" feature. The staff of Game Informer magazine ranked Dracula the third "Top Villain of 2006", citing the final boss fight in Portrait of Ruin, and listed it as one of the "Top 50 Games of 2006", calling it "one of the best experiences in gaming". Furthermore, they awarded it "Handheld Game of the Month" for January 2007. Upon its release, IGN awarded it "Nintendo DS Game of the Month" for December 2006, citing the improvements over its predecessor. The staff further commented that despite some flaws, Portrait of Ruin is among the top five Castlevania titles. For IGN's Best of 2006, the publication's staff awarded the game "Best Original Score" among DS games, citing the "eclectic mix of songs" that perfectly matched their respective levels' aesthetics. IGN also listed it as runner-up for "Best Adventure Game" on the Nintendo DS; the publication's readers, however, selected Portrait of Ruin the winner of this category.

Portrait of Ruin has received a positive retrospective reception years after its release as well. In a 2011 IGN retrospective about the Castlevania series on the Nintendo DS, Lucas Thomas described Portrait of Ruin as a "solid sequel" that improved on the concept of using two characters. He further wrote that the game was a good homage to the series for its 20th anniversary. Writing for GameZone that same year, Robert Workman ranked it the ninth best Castlevania game in the series, complimenting the title for its changes without sacrificing quality. Game Informer's Tim Turi ranked the game as the 12th best Castlevania title in 2012. He praised the cooperative element and wrote that its design should be emulated more often. In 2023, IGN staff ranked the title as the 23rd "Best DS Game of All Time" in terms of innovatively using the system's hardware to push its series forward.

== Legacy ==
Portrait of Ruin was followed by Castlevania: Order of Ecclesia in 2008 on the Nintendo DS. Developed by the same team, the game features a female protagonist and online multiplayer modes. Igarashi adopted the online cooperative gameplay for Portrait of Ruin as an experiment in network gameplay. Konami eventually released an online multiplayer-focused game in 2010, Castlevania: Harmony of Despair, which features an ensemble of Castlevania characters, including Jonathan and Charlotte. The company also released a Pyramid level, based on Portrait of Ruin's Egyptian-theme stage, as paid downloadable content for Harmony of Despair.

On August 27, 2024, Portrait of Ruin was re-released as part of the Castlevania Dominus Collection for the Nintendo Switch, PlayStation 5, Windows, and Xbox Series X/S platforms alongside Castlevania: Dawn of Sorrow, Castlevania: Order of Ecclesia, and Haunted Castle Revisited. The Dominus Collection was also received well, with an OpenCritic rating of 96% based on 47 reviews. Famitsu writer Nishikawa commented that the compilation was a great deal and praised the features that the development company, M2, added. In describing the included titles, Nishikawa noted Portrait of Ruin for its combination of anime-style and serious atmosphere as well as the wide range of tactics the two character gameplay provides. Ollie Reynolds of Nintendo Life also praised the compilation, calling Portrait of Ruin and the other two Castlevania DS games the "peak" of the franchise.

== See also ==
- Aliens Infestation – 2011 Metroidvania game on Nintendo DS where the player controls multiple characters
