= Leedmees =

2011 video game

- Developer: Konami
- Publisher: Konami
- Producer: Koji Igarashi
- Platform: Xbox 360 (XBLA)
- Release: September 7, 2011
- Genre: Puzzle
- Modes: Single-player, multiplayer

Leedmees is a puzzle game by Konami exclusively for Xbox 360 and requires Kinect. It is available for download via Xbox Live Arcade. It was launched on September 7, 2011.

== Gameplay ==
Leedmees is a puzzle game in which you take on the role of a giant who must help tiny creatures called Leedmees to safety by using your body to form bridges and avoiding obstacles. The game is designed for 1 or 2 players. There are 50 single-player levels and 12 co-op levels.

== Reception ==
Reception

Aggregate score
Aggregator	Score
Metacritic	60/100

Review scores
Publication	Score
Eurogamer	7/10
GameSpot	6/10
GamesRadar+	2.5/5
Official Xbox Magazine (US)	4.5/10

Leedmees received mixed reviews from critics upon release. On Metacritic, the game holds a score of 60/100 based on 10 reviews, indicating "mixed or average reviews".

In a review from XblaFans, the game was described as "one of the most creative uses of Kinect so far" but was let down by its poor controls.
