= Castlevania: Dawn of Sorrow =

2005 action role-playing game

- North American box art
- Developer: Konami TYO
- Publisher: Konami
- Director: Satoshi Kushibuchi
- Producer: Koji Igarashi
- Programmer: Shutaro Iida
- Writer: Koji Igarashi
- Composers: Masahiko Kimura; Michiru Yamane
- Series: Castlevania
- Platforms: Nintendo DS, Mobile phone
- Release: JP: August 25, 2005; EU: September 30, 2005; NA: October 4, 2005; AU: October 6, 2005
- Genres: Action role-playing, Metroidvania
- Modes: Single-player, multiplayer

Castlevania: Dawn of Sorrow (Note: Known in Japan as Akumajō Dracula: Sōgetsu no Jūjika (悪魔城ドラキュラ ～蒼月の十字架～, Akumajō Dorakyura: Sōgetsu no Jūjika; lit. Demon Castle Dracula: Cross of the Blue Moon)) is a 2005 action role-playing game developed and published by Konami. It is part of Konami's Castlevania video game series and the first Castlevania game released on the Nintendo DS. The game is the sequel to Castlevania: Aria of Sorrow and incorporates many elements from its predecessor.

Dawn of Sorrow continues the story of Aria of Sorrow: Dracula has been defeated, with his powers assumed by his reincarnation, Soma Cruz. With the help of his allies, Soma avoids becoming the new dark lord. A cult forms to bring forth a new one by killing Soma. Soma and his allies move to ensure that does not happen.

Dawn of Sorrow incorporates many features from earlier Castlevania games: the combination of elements from platform games and role-playing video games, the "Tactical Soul" system featured in Aria of Sorrow and a dark, gothic atmosphere. Dawn of Sorrow introduces gameplay elements, like the "Magic Seal" system, which requires the use of the DS stylus to draw a pattern to defeat powerful enemies, a distinctive anime character design, and a multiplayer mode, where two players compete for fastest times on a prerendered level. Dawn of Sorrow was commercially successful. It sold more than 15,000 units in its first week in Japan and 164,000 units in the United States during the three months after its initial release. The game received high scores from many video game publications, and was considered one of the best games on the Nintendo DS for 2005. The game was re-released in Japan in June 2006, and later in North America during 2007 as part of the "Konami the Best" line.

The game was re-released as part of the Castlevania Dominus Collection on August 27, 2024 for the Nintendo Switch, PlayStation 5, Windows, and Xbox Series X/S alongside Castlevania: Portrait of Ruin, Castlevania: Order of Ecclesia, and Haunted Castle Revisited.

== Gameplay ==
An image of gameplay, with the primary character, Soma Cruz, using the Flame Demon soul. The upper screen shows the character's statistics and information on the enemy.

The player controls the onscreen character from a third-person perspective to interact with people, objects, and enemies. Like previous games in the series, and most role-playing video games, characters level up each time they earn a set number of experience points from defeating enemies; each level gained increases the character's statistics, thus improving their performance in battle. Statistic examples include hit points, the amount of damage a character can receive; magic points, which determine the number of times a character can use magical attacks; strength, the power of a character's physical attacks; and intelligence, the power of a character's magical spells. Upon encountering an enemy, the player can use a variety of weapons to attack and defeat the enemy. The weapon choices are largely medieval, including swords, axes, and spears, although handguns and a rocket-propelled grenade are available. These weapons differ in their damage output, their range, and the speed of the attack.

Dawn of Sorrow, like most games in the Castlevania series, is set in a castle, which is divided into various areas. Areas of the castle differ in their composition, including monsters and terrain features. In addition, each area has its own unique piece of theme music which plays while the player is in that area. The character moves around the environment based on the player's choices; however, the items the player has restricts the areas the character can move into, like most platform games. Progression, however, is not linear, as players are free to explore the parts of the castle they have access to, and can backtrack or move forward as they see fit.

=== Tactical Soul ===
The primary method for the player to gain additional abilities in the game is the absorption of souls via the Tactical Soul system originally featured in Aria of Sorrow. Except for human enemies and the game's final opponent, the player can absorb all enemies' souls. The chances for absorbing a soul varies by enemy, as certain enemies release souls more regularly than others. The player can absorb multiple copies of the same soul; many of these souls will increase in effectiveness depending on the number of the same soul a player possesses. Souls provide a variety of effects and are separated into four categories: Bullet, Guardian, Enchant, and Ability souls. The player can have only one type of Bullet, Guardian, and Enchant soul equipped at any given time. However, when the player acquires the "Doppelgänger" soul, they can have two different weapon and soul setups, and switch between them at will. Players can trade souls wirelessly using two Dawn of Sorrow game cards.

Bullet souls are often projectiles and consume a set number of magic points upon use. Guardian souls provide continuous effects including transforming into mythical creatures, defensive abilities, and the summoning of familiars. The movement and attacking of familiars can be directly controlled with the stylus. Guardian souls continually drain magic points so long as they are activated. Several Guardian souls can be used in with Bullet souls to execute special attacks called Tactical Soul combos. Enchant souls offer statistical bonuses and resistance against several forms of attack. They are passive, and require no magic points to remain active. Ability souls give the player new abilities and are required to move into certain areas of the castle. They are always active, and therefore not equipped – nor do they consume magic points. Some examples include the abilities to break ice blocks with the stylus and to double-jump.

Souls can be spent to permanently transform a character's weapon. At Yoko Belnades' shop, the player can remove certain souls from their inventory to change their weapon into a stronger form. Certain weapons can be acquired only by using souls to strengthen a lesser form of the weapon. Souls are used in the "Enemy Set" mode, where a player builds a custom scenario. The player can place monsters inside rooms if they have acquired the monster's soul in the main game, but boss enemies cannot be added to any scenario, even if the player has the boss' soul. Two players using two Nintendo DS consoles can compete in these scenarios, with the winner being the one with the fastest time completing the course.

=== Magic Seal ===
A Magic Seal presented after reducing a boss's health to zero

The Magic Seal system is a new feature introduced in Dawn of Sorrow that uses the DS touchscreen. Once the player reduces the hit points of a "boss" enemy to zero, a circle will appear, and the game will automatically draw a pattern connecting any number of smaller circles on the circumference of the larger circle. After this, the player is prompted to draw the same pattern on the touchscreen in a set amount of time. If the player fails to draw the pattern accurately within the time limit, the boss will regain health and the battle will resume. If successful, the boss will be defeated. More powerful boss enemies require higher level Magic Seals, which have more intricate and complex patterns as the level increases and are found over the course of the game.

=== Julius Mode ===
After the player completes the game with either the bad ending or the best ending, Julius Mode (similar to that in Aria of Sorrow) is unlocked. In storyline terms, Julius Mode follows the assumption that Soma succumbed to his dark power and became the new dark lord. A new game can be started from the main menu in Julius Mode. In Julius Mode, the playable characters include Julius Belmont, Yoko Belnades, and Alucard. Each character has a weapon and assorted unique abilities. Although these abilities remain static throughout the entire game, the characters' statistics can improve by acquiring enough experience points to level up. The castle layout and enemies are the same except for the final battle, which is against Soma.

== Plot ==
=== Setting ===
Dawn of Sorrow is set in the fictional universe of the Castlevania series. The primary premise of the series is the struggle of the vampire hunters of the Belmont clan against the vampire Dracula and his legacy. Before the events of Castlevania: Aria of Sorrow, Dracula was defeated and his castle sealed within a solar eclipse. With Dracula dead, a prophecy relating to who would inherit his powers drove the events of Aria of Sorrow, with the protagonist, Soma Cruz, realizing that he was Dracula's reincarnation. Soma manages to escape his fate of becoming the new dark lord with the help of his allies. Dawn of Sorrow takes place one year after the events of Aria of Sorrow, when Soma believes his inherited powers have been lost. Most of the game is played inside a copy of Dracula's castle, which is subdivided into several areas through which the player must venture over the course of the game. The future setting of both Aria of Sorrow and Dawn of Sorrow, as well as a storyline beginning after Dracula's defeat, reflects Koji Igarashi's desire to take a "different route" with Aria of Sorrow.

=== Characters ===
The primary playable character in Dawn of Sorrow is Soma Cruz, the reincarnation of Dracula, the longtime antagonist of the Castlevania series. Mina Hakuba, the daughter of the priest of the Hakuba shrine supports him in his quest; Genya Arikado, a mysterious government agent dealing primarily with the supernatural; Julius Belmont, the latest member of the Belmont clan of vampire hunters featured in the series; Yoko Belnades, a witch in the service of the Roman Catholic Church; and Hammer, a vendor of military material who retains a large information network.

A cult dedicated to the resurrection of Dracula serves as the game's antagonists. Celia Fortner is a shadow priestess heading the cult. She seeks to revive him to prevent the loss of her magical powers. Dmitrii Blinov, a ruthless manipulator, and Dario Bossi, a vicious firebrand, are Celia's primary lieutenants. They are the "dark lord's candidates", born on the day Dracula was slain and thus can assume the mantle of Dracula by destroying his soul, which is present in Soma Cruz.

=== Story ===
One year after the events in Aria of Sorrow, Soma is living peacefully, and believes his powers have been lost. A woman who identifies herself as Celia Fortner, appears and summons several monsters. Arikado arrives to help Soma defeat the monsters, after which Soma absorbs their souls. Celia retreats, proclaiming that she will destroy Soma. Soma expresses disbelief at the return of his powers, but Arikado reveals that his powers were never lost, only dormant. He informs Soma that Celia is the head of a cult that seeks the resurrection of the dark lord. He leaves, instructing Soma not to pursue Celia.

Soma, however, uses information acquired from Hammer to locate the cult's base, a facsimile of Dracula's castle. Hammer arrives, and as he has left the military, agrees to help Soma by opening up a shop in the village outside the castle. After entering the castle, Soma encounters Yoko and Julius Belmont. As Julius leaves, Soma escorts Yoko to a safe location. During this time, she instructs him in the use of a Magic Seal, which is necessary to defeat certain monsters in the castle. As Soma travels farther into the castle, he meets Celia, who is flanked by two men, Dmitrii Blinov and Dario Bossi. Celia explains their nature as the "dark lord's candidates", who can become the dark lord by destroying Soma. He later encounters Dmitrii and is able to defeat him. Soma gains dominance over his soul, although he acquires no abilities. As Soma travels further, he comes upon Dario. Soma bests him, and Celia teleports Dario away from harm.

Soma meets Arikado, who is initially angered by Soma's presence, but accepts the situation. He gives Soma a letter and a talisman from Mina. Soma briefs Arikado on the current situation, and Arikado leaves to locate Dario. Soma comes upon Dario and Julius who is later defeated due to his inability to use the Magic Seals. Dario retreats, instructing Soma to fight him in the castle's throne room. Soma does so, lambasting Dario for desiring only power, and promising to defeat him. Before the battle begins, Soma uses one of his souls to transport himself into the mirror in the room, revealing Aguni, the flame demon sealed within Dario's soul. Soma defeats Aguni, leaving Dario powerless. As Dario flees, Celia arrives, and instructs Soma to come to the castle's center.

Upon arriving, Soma is forced to watch Celia kill Mina. Furious, he begins to succumb to his dark power. The talisman Mina gave Soma is able to slow the transformation, enabling Arikado to arrive in time to inform Soma that the "Mina" who Celia killed was a doppelgänger. This aborts the transformation, but a soul leaves Soma and enters the doppelgänger, which takes on the appearance of Dmitrii. Dmitrii says that when Soma defeated him he allowed himself to be absorbed, wishing to use his powers to copy Soma's ability to dominate the souls of Dracula's minions. He then leaves with Celia to absorb the souls of many powerful demons and monsters in an attempt to increase his power. Soma and Arikado chase after the pair, and find them in the castle's basement. Dmitrii, using Celia as a sacrifice, seals Arikado's powers, and engages Soma. However, his soul is unable to bear the strain of controlling the demons he has absorbed, and they erupt out of him, combining into one gargantuan creature called Menace. Soma manages to defeat it, but the souls composing the demon begin to fall under Soma's dominance. He becomes overwhelmed and rejects them, fleeing from the castle with Arikado. Soma is conflicted over the present situation. He believes it was his responsibility to become the dark lord, and that the events of the game were the result of his not accepting this responsibility. Arikado convinces him his fate is not fixed. Soma then shares a tender moment with Mina, much to the amusement of his onlooking friends.

If Soma does not have Mina's talisman equipped when he witnesses Celia slay the Mina doppelganger, he will not realize the deception, and fully accept his dark powers, ending the game and unlocking a new mode, in which Julius, Yoko and Arikado, now assuming his true form as Alucard, must venture into the castle to kill Soma. The game may also end early if Dario is confronted directly from the start, upon which he will lose control of Aguni and die by immolation, enabling Celia to escape and Dmitrii to secretly possess Soma through his absorbed soul.

== Development ==
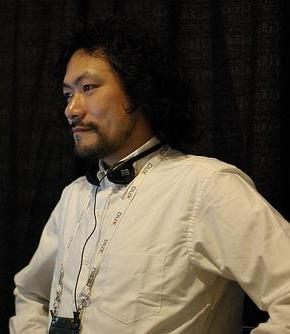
Longtime Castlevania producer Koji Igarashi (shown in 2007) led the production team and wrote the game's story.

The production of Dawn of Sorrow was announced on January 6, 2005, as the first Castlevania game to be released for the Nintendo DS. Longtime Castlevania producer Koji Igarashi was in charge of the production. The original design team from Aria of Sorrow, as well as personnel from Konami Tokyo, were involved in the production of Dawn of Sorrow. The choice to develop the game for the Nintendo DS instead of the Sony PlayStation Portable was due to Aria of Sorrow's success on Nintendo's Game Boy Advance, and Igarashi's observations of both consoles during the 2005 E3 Media and Business Summit. He felt it was a waste to use the storyline with Soma Cruz and the Tactical Soul system in only one game, contributing to his desire to make a sequel. Igarashi intended to include a white-collar Japanese worker in the game. This worker would be a manager in a Japanese firm and have a family. However, the development team's opposition to this idea forced him to drop it.

The use of the technical features of the Nintendo DS was one of the production team's principal concerns during development. The DS touchscreen was a primary point of interest. Because Dawn of Sorrow was developed around the handheld console's launch, Igarashi felt pressured to feature touch controls. Several functions such as picking up items on the screen and moving them were originally intended to be incorporated into the game. However, scheduling problems forced the development team to abandon many of these ideas. Igarashi's primary concern with using the touchscreen was that it would detract from "the Castlevania pure action gameplay", since the player would have to slow down play to use the stylus. The DS microphone was looked at during development, but Igarashi noted that although he found humorous uses for it, it was never seriously considered for inclusion in the game.

For the graphical representations of the game's enemies, Igarashi had sprites from earlier Castlevania games such as Castlevania: Symphony of the Night reused, and the development team redesigned them for use on the Nintendo DS. Unlike most recent Castlevania games, Ayami Kojima did not participate in designing the characters for Dawn of Sorrow. Instead, the characters were drawn in a distinctive anime style, influenced by producer Koji Igarashi who wanted to market the game to a younger audience. Aria of Sorrow's sales figures did not meet expectations, and as a result, Igarashi consulted Konami's sales department. The staff concluded that the demographics of the Game Boy Advance did not line up with the series' target age group. Igarashi believed the Nintendo DS inherently attracted a younger audience, and he was working to court them with the anime style. Furthermore, Igarashi considered the anime style a litmus test for whether future Castlevania games would incorporate it. Kojima's hiatus from Dawn of Sorrow allowed her to concentrate upon her character designs for Castlevania: Curse of Darkness.

=== Audio ===
Michiru Yamane and Masahiko Kimura composed the game's music. Yamane, a longtime composer of music for the Castlevania series, had worked earlier on the music of Castlevania games such as Symphony of the Night and Aria of Sorrow. Kimura had developed the music for Castlevania on the Nintendo 64. In an interview, Yamane noted that she made the music "simple" and "easy to recognize", similar to her work on previous Castlevania games. She drew a parallel between her work on Castlevania games for the Game Boy Advance and her music for Dawn of Sorrow. In the same interview Igarashi said making music for handheld game consoles, regardless of the type, is largely the same, although he accepted that the DS's sound capabilities were better than those of the Game Boy Advance.

== Release ==
In Japan, the game sold over 15,000 units in its first week, acquiring the number ten slot in software sales. The game sold over 164,000 copies in the first three months after its release in the United States. The game was re-released in Japan in June 2006, and later in North America during 2007 as part of the "Konami the Best" line.

In 2024, Dawn of Sorrow was re-released as part of the Castlevania Dominus Collection for the Nintendo Switch, PlayStation 5, Windows, and Xbox Series X/S platforms alongside Castlevania: Portrait of Ruin, Castlevania: Order of Ecclesia, and Haunted Castle Revisited. Famitsu writer Nishikawa commented that the compilation was a great deal and praised the features that the development company, M2, added. In describing the included titles, Nishikawa noted Dawn of Sorrow for its popular extra modes and described it as a stand-out title in the series. Ollie Reynolds of Nintendo Life also praised the compilation, calling Dawn of Sorrow and the other two Castlevania DS games the "peak" of the franchise.

== Reception ==
Reception

Aggregate scores
Aggregator	Score
GameRankings	90.35%
Metacritic	89/100
OpenCritic	96% recommend(Dominus Collection)

Review scores
Publication	Score
1Up.com	A
Eurogamer	9/10
Famitsu	33/40
Game Informer	9.25/10
GameSpot	8.9/10
GameSpy	4.5/5
IGN	9.3/10
Nintendo Life	9/10
Nintendo World Report	9.5/10
X-Play	5/5

Dawn of Sorrow has received critical acclaim from many video game publications, with several hailing it as the best Nintendo DS game of 2005. Japanese gaming publication Famitsu gave it a 33 out of 40 score. Many reviewers noted that despite being highly similar to Aria of Sorrow, it managed to define itself as a standalone title. GameSpot commented that Dawn of Sorrow succeeded in continuing 2D games as a definite genre, and it "keeps that flame burning as bright as ever". GameSpot also considered it for the accolade of best Nintendo DS game of 2005, with the prize ultimately going to Mario Kart DS. Editors at IGN awarded Dawn of Sorrow the prize of best adventure game on the DS for 2005.

The gameplay, and the Tactical Soul system in particular, received praise from reviewers. The sheer depth of the abilities of the numerous souls found in the game was lauded, and IGN believed the ability to have two customizable "profiles" of different abilities was "an extremely handy idea". The relative difficulty of the game and its length was also brought into question, with GameSpot noting that the game could be finished in five hours and "is fairly easy as far as Castlevania games go".

GameSpot extolled the game's animation and graphics, describing the backgrounds as "intricate and gorgeous" and the individual animation, especially of enemies, as one of the game's "highlights". IGN echoed this assessment, calling the animation "stunning and fluid", and noted the differences in graphics between Aria of Sorrow and Dawn of Sorrow, saying the latter was on a "broader and more impressive scale". Reviewers lambasted the use of an anime style of drawing the characters, as opposed to the traditional gothic presentation of illustrator Ayami Kojima in earlier Castlevania games. GameSpy deplored the "shallow, lifeless anime images" used for the characters and Kojima's absence from the production. IGN believed the new images were "down to the level of 'generic Saturday morning Anime' quality". The audio by Michiru Yamane and Masahiko Kimura was highly regarded, with GameSpot saying it was "head and shoulders above [Aria of Sorrow]". IGN noted that the DS dual speaker system presented the audio "extraordinarily well". In the review from 1UP.com, the game's score was compared to the soundtrack of Symphony of the Night, with "excellent" sound quality and "exceptional" compositions.

The functionality associated with the Nintendo DS, namely the touchscreen and the Magic Seal system, was subject to criticism from reviewers. GameSpot noted that it was difficult to use the stylus immediately after the game prompted the player to draw the Magic Seal, thus forcing the player to use their fingernail on the touchscreen. Other functions using the touchscreen, including clearing ice blocks, were viewed as trivial, with GameSpy calling it a "gimmick". However, IGN dismissed the lack of DS functionality as a major issue, claiming it "doesn't hurt the product in the slightest". In 2010, the game was included as one of the titles in the book 1001 Video Games You Must Play Before You Die.
