= Koji Igarashi =

Japanese video game designer

- 五十嵐 孝司
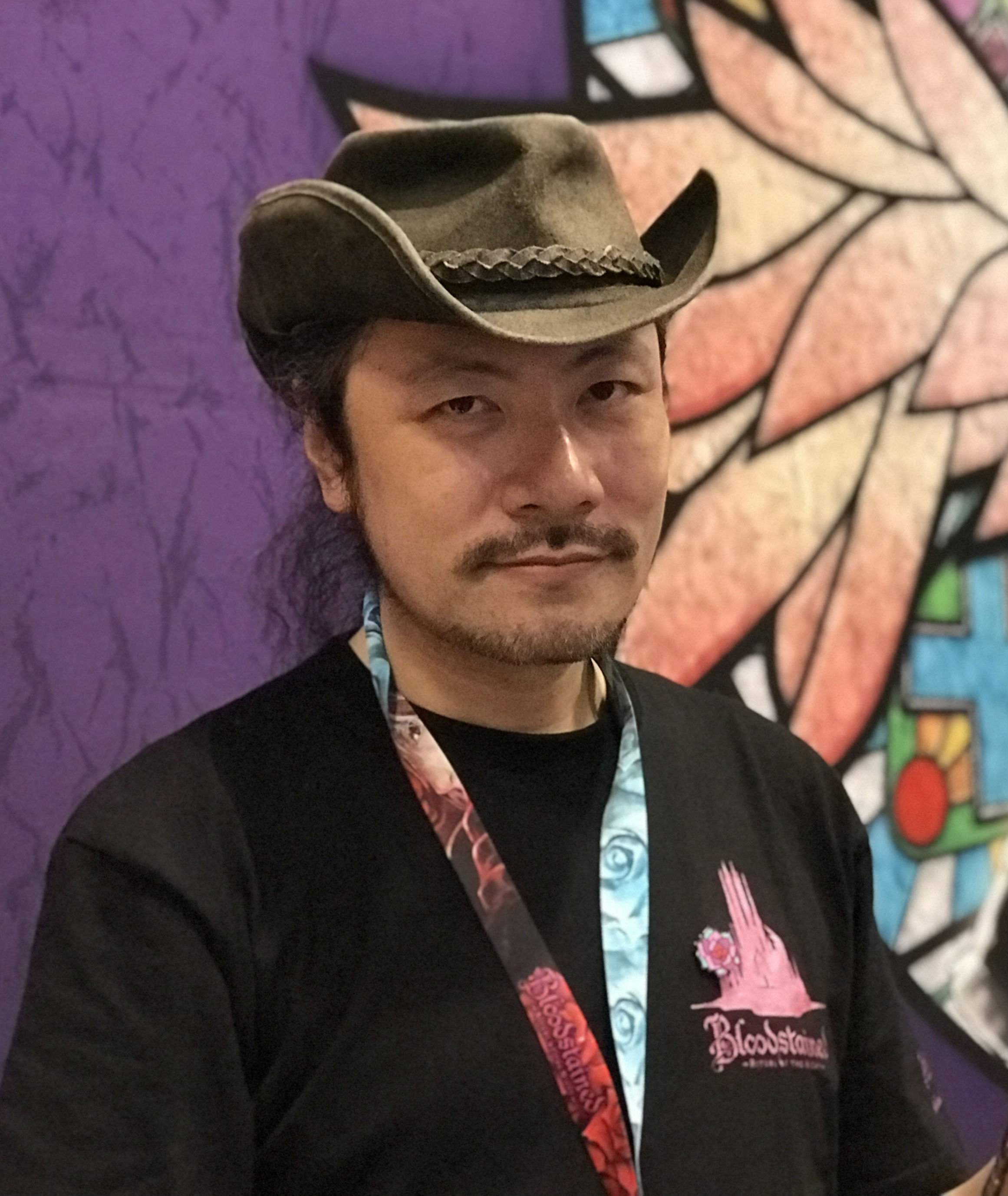
- Igarashi at the 2017 New York Comic Con
- Born: March 17, 1968 (age 58); Aizuwakamatsu, Fukushima, Japan
- Other name: IGA
- Occupations: Video game producer, video game writer
- Employer(s): Konami (1990–2014); ArtPlay (2014–present)
- Known for: Castlevania series; Bloodstained series

Koji Igarashi (Japanese: 五十嵐 孝司, Hepburn: Igarashi Kōji; born March 17, 1968) is a Japanese video game producer, programmer, writer, and creative director. In 2009, he was chosen by IGN as one of the top 100 game creators of all time.

Often credited as IGA, he began his career by joining Konami in 1990 as a programmer. Over the next ten years, he moved into a senior role within the company, working on Castlevania: Symphony of the Night as a programmer, writer, and assistant director. He later served as the lead producer on the Castlevania series, starting with Castlevania Chronicles in 2001 and ending with Castlevania: Harmony of Despair in 2011. During his time with Konami, he was also involved in other titles, such as Nano Breaker and Tokimeki Memorial. In 2014, Igarashi left Konami to later become the co-founder of Artplay who in June 2019 released Bloodstained: Ritual of the Night, a spiritual successor to the Castlevania series.

== Early life ==
Koji Igarashi was born in the Fukushima Prefecture on March 17, 1968. His father was a lumberjack. Igarashi had an interest in becoming a carpenter and later to be an artist. As a teenager, he would explore the nearby Komine Castle with a camcorder. His first experience with video games was Atari's tennis game Pong at age 10, and an arcade game Crazy Climber two years later led him to want to design games. He taught himself the computer program languages BASIC and assembly language, and designed amateur games. While attending university, he received a job offer from the company Grafika, which he had to turn down as he did not wish to work there. He accepted the next job offer, which was at Konami.

== Career ==
=== Konami ===
After graduating from college, Igarashi began working at Konami. His first project was working as a programmer for a simulation game for the Educational Software department. The game would be a business simulation, and the team took inspiration from the Fire Emblem series, but after 12 months the game was cancelled. He moved to the Consumer division and worked on enemy programming for the PC Engine version of Detana!! Twinbee. He worked as a programmer and was tasked with writing the story for Tokimeki Memorial, a dating sim for the PC Engine's Super CD-ROM² System. His girlfriend at the time, later wife, was an employee at Konami working on Castlevania: Rondo of Blood. She gave him advice on how to write the story to Tokimeki Memorial, and he would play Rondo of Blood during breaks. Igarashi informed his boss that he had no desire to work on a sequel to Tokimeki Memorial, and requested a departmental transfer. The strong sales of the game prompted his boss to agree, and Igarashi asked to join the Castlevania development team.

Igarashi began working on a Castlevania game set for the 32X. However, the game was cancelled as Konami shifted its focus away from the unsuccessful 32X and towards the PlayStation. Igarashi's next project was the PlayStation game Castlevania: Symphony of the Night, where he worked on scenario writing and programming. Halfway through the game's production, director Toru Hagihara received a company promotion, which promoted Igarashi to assistant director to complete the game. The game was well received critically, later serving as an influence on the "Metroidvania" genre, though it did not translate into strong sales.

After the release of Symphony of the Night, Igarashi was director for the 2000 PlayStation role-playing game Elder Gate. Igarashi says that he was motivated to create the game because he had played other heavy story driven games and after a long break had lost motivation to continue. He says he wanted to make a game that could be played at any time, and could feel fresh every time you played it. He wanted each player to have their own unique experience when playing the game. The game received a 22 out of 40 score from the magazine Famitsu.

Following that, Igarashi served as the producer for Castlevania Chronicles, which was a PlayStation port of a 1993 X68000 game. From there, he was the producer and writer for Castlevania: Harmony of Dissonance, the second Castlevania title for the Game Boy Advance. The goal was to attempt to create a game similar to Symphony of the Night. This included bringing back artist Ayami Kojima as character designer, who had previously worked on Symphony of the Night. Igarashi felt that the previous title, Castlevania: Circle of the Moon, was too dark on the Game Boy Advance's screen, so he felt the need to make the game brighter.

During his time at Konami, Igarashi was often seen wearing a cowboy hat and brandishing a leather whip which he brought along with him to media events such as the Electronic Entertainment Expo.

In March 2007, writer Warren Ellis announced that he was working on a straight to DVD animated film adaption of Castlevania III: Dracula's Curse along with Koji Igarashi. Ellis explained how he worked with Igarashi to fit the film into the timeline of the series, including writing a new backstory, and how Igarashi required a full eight re-writes of pre-production material. After languishing in development hell for years, the project, titled Castlevania, was released on Netflix in 2017.

At the 2008 Tokyo Game Show, Igarashi showcased a teaser was for an upcoming game starring Alucard, which was slated for release on the PlayStation 3 and Xbox 360. Igarashi would later note that despite a lot of time and money had been spent on the project, development had not been going smoothly. In parallel, MercurySteam had produced a prototype that Igarashi notes looked better than his project. Konami decided to cancel Igarashi's project and go with MercurySteam's, which was released as Castlevania: Lords of Shadow in 2010. Igarashi did not have any input on the title and did not put forth any future pitches for more 2D Castlevania titles.

At the end of 2011, he was moved to the Social division of Konami. There he still produced some games for consoles. In 2011, he was producer for Otomedius Excellent, a side-scrolling shooting game for the Xbox 360, the Kinect game Leedmees and worked to localize the Nintendo DS game Scribblenauts. Konami's business model had shifted more towards mobile game development. While there, Igarashi had tried to develop mobile games that played more like console games, but was unable to release any titles. Igarashi felt that his experience with console games led him to be unable to make the leap to social games. He left Konami in March 2014.

Out of the Castlevania games he has worked on, Igarashi says that Symphony of the Night is his favorite, and out of the overall series, he cites Castlevania III: Dracula's Curse, giving the sound quality and world setting as reasons for liking it the most. His other favorite Castlevania game is Castlevania: Aria of Sorrow, because of the change it introduced to the series.

=== ArtPlay ===
Igarashi attempted and failed to find a publisher funding a new console game. In September 2014, he became a founding member of the company ArtPlay. A Chinese businessman, Mr. Feng Gang, acts as CEO and Igarashi acts as chief producer. Igarashi had met his business partner while working on mobile games at Konami, but the project did not result in a finished game. Both Igarashi and his partner left their companies, and his partner invited him to join him in making a new mobile game company, but Igarashi initially refused as he did not want to work on mobile games. ArtPlay has both a Chinese branch and a Japanese branch, and Igarashi works in the Japanese one. The goal of the company is to be both a mobile and console game company, with profits from mobile games leading to development of console games, and the console games will spawn mobile spinoffs. The Artplay website lists 2.3 billion yen in capital. In 2015, Igarashi appeared at the ChinaJoy Game Developer Conference (CDGC) in China.

Drawing inspiration in Keiji Inafune, who had left Capcom to form his own studio and launch his new game Mighty No. 9 via crowd sourcing, Igarashi decided to launch his own Kickstarter campaign for his new project. A month prior to the launch of the kickstarter campaign, Igarashi filmed a pitch at Castello di Amorosa in Northern California with the help of 2 Player Productions. Launched in May 2015, Bloodstained: Ritual of the Night – a spiritual successor to the Metroidvania style of Castlevania games – had asked for US$500,000, and was funded in several hours after its opening. It eventually raised US$5.5 million, making it the most successful video game on the Kickstarter platform until Shenmue III broke this record about two months later. Bloodstained: Ritual of the Night was released on multiple platforms in June 2019 and received favorable reviews. Alongside Bloodstained, ArtPlay also announced in 2015 the mobile game Code S Plan.

In October 2018, Igarashi was announced to be working with Sega on a game titled Revolve8. Revolve8: Episodic Duelling, a player versus player real-time strategy mobile game, was released in February 2019 on iOS and Android.

== Works ==
Year	Title	Role
1992	Detana!! TwinBee	Programmer
1992	Gradius II	Programmer
1994	Tokimeki Memorial	Scenario writer, programmer
1997	Castlevania: Symphony of the Night	Assistant director, programmer, scenario writer
2000	Elder Gate	Director
2001	Castlevania Chronicles	Producer
2002	Castlevania: Harmony of Dissonance	Producer, scenario writer
2003	Castlevania: Aria of Sorrow	Producer, scenario writer
2003	Castlevania: Lament of Innocence	Producer, scenario writer
2004	Nano Breaker	Producer
2005	Castlevania: Dawn of Sorrow	Producer, scenario writer
2005	Castlevania: Curse of Darkness	Producer, scenario writer
2006	Castlevania: Portrait of Ruin	Producer, scenario writer
2007	Castlevania: The Dracula X Chronicles	Producer, scenario writer
2008	Castlevania: Order of Ecclesia	Producer
2008	Castlevania Judgment	Producer
2008	Scribblenauts	Japanese localization
2009	Castlevania: The Adventure ReBirth	Producer
2010	Castlevania: Harmony of Despair	Producer
2011	Otomedius Excellent	Producer
2011	Leedmees	Producer
2018	Bloodstained: Curse of the Moon	Producer, scenario supervisor
2019	Bloodstained: Ritual of the Night	Producer, scenario writer
2019	Revolve8: Episodic Duelling	Character draft
2020	Bloodstained: Curse of the Moon 2	Producer, scenario supervisor
2027	Bloodstained: The Scarlet Engagement	Producer
