= Castlevania: Order of Ecclesia =

2008 video game

- North American box art
- Developer: Konami
- Publisher: Konami
- Director: Akihiro Minakata
- Producer: Koji Igarashi
- Programmer: Shutaro Iida
- Artist: Masaki Hirooka
- Writers: Kei Shigema; Tomohiro Takeda; Katuyuki Kuriyama; Takayoshi Kakehashi
- Composers: Michiru Yamane; Yasuhiro Ichihashi
- Series: Castlevania
- Platform: Nintendo DS
- Release: NA: October 21, 2008; JP: October 23, 2008; EU: February 6, 2009; AU: March 12, 2009
- Genres: Action role-playing, Metroidvania
- Modes: Single-player, multiplayer

Castlevania: Order of Ecclesia (Note: Known in Japan as Akumajō Dracula: Ubawareta Kokuin (悪魔城ドラキュラ 奪われた刻印, Akumajō Dorakyura Ubawareta Kokuin; lit. Demon Castle Dracula: The Stolen Seal)) is a 2008 action role-playing game and the third Nintendo DS installment of the Castlevania franchise. It was directed by Akihiro Minakata, with producer Koji Igarashi returning. The plot involves Shanoa, who is part of an organization set to defeat Dracula after the Belmont clan has vanished.

The game was re-released as part of the Castlevania Dominus Collection on August 27, 2024 for the Nintendo Switch, PlayStation 5, Windows, and Xbox Series X/S alongside Castlevania: Dawn of Sorrow, Castlevania: Portrait of Ruin, and Haunted Castle Revisited.

== Gameplay ==
The player-character Shanoa can acquire glyphs, abilities dropped by defeated enemies.

Castlevania: Order of Ecclesia is a two dimensional action-adventure game, featuring adventure and role-playing elements such as the ability to equip armor and cast spells. A new combat system called the "Glyph System" allows the player's character, Shanoa, to collect icons called "Glyph symbols", which she can acquire by defeating enemies or conquering challenges. These symbols can be equipped to her arms and back, allowing her to perform special powers and skills. There are over 100 different Glyphs the player can wield, such as weapon and magic glyphs. Glyphs use Magic Points (MP) to work, and once the MP gauge is depleted, the player must stop attacking to allow it to recharge. The player can also use a special Glyph Union technique, which calls a more powerful attack based on the glyphs equipped. The Union attacks consume the Heart Points gauge, a feature that was absent in Portrait of Ruin. There are also certain Glyphs which can be used to solve some puzzles.

Many different types of locales can be visited in the game, including forests, mountains, and oceans. There are a total of 20 locations, with an overworld map used to traverse between them. Besides fighting enemies and moving on from one location to next, there are also a number of side quests for the player to solve. After completing a quest, the player will receive a prize in return. If the player finishes the game, new features will become available to the player, including sound test, hard mode, boss rush mode and Albus mode, with an alternate playable character. It also features online play, allowing the player to trade items with other players or go head-to-head in a versus mode. The game also makes use of the DS-to-Wii connectivity with Castlevania Judgment, which unlocks content in both games. Order of Ecclesia is the first canonical game in the series in which the Vampire Killer whip does not appear in any form.

== Plot ==
Castlevania: Order of Ecclesia takes place after Castlevania: Symphony of the Night, sometime in the 1800s, right after the era of Richter Belmont. Since the Belmont Clan had vanished by that time, several organizations are created in order to research countermeasures against Dracula and his eventual return. Among these organizations, the most promising was the Order of Ecclesia, who created a triad of magical glyphs based on Dracula's power, named "Dominus." Shanoa is a member chosen by the order's leader, Barlowe, as the human vessel for Dominus. As the ritual begins, the Dominus glyphs (Anger, Hatred, Agony) are stolen by Shanoa's colleague Albus, and Shanoa loses her memories and emotions. She goes to retrieve them, unaware of his true intentions.

In her pursuit, Shanoa arrives in the deserted Wygol Village and finds out that Albus kidnapped its inhabitants, brought them to different hidden locations, and imprisoned them. As Shanoa rescues them throughout the game, she learns that Albus captured them to perform some kind of experiment on them which involved taking samples of their blood. On two occasions, Shanoa tracks down Albus, who willingly gives her two of the Dominus glyphs. When she finds him to be possessed by the power of the third glyph, she is forced to fight him. After killing Albus, his mind and soul are absorbed by Shanoa together with the last Dominus glyph. Albus explains that his true intentions were to find a way to defeat Dracula without Shanoa using Dominus, as he knew that it would kill her if she used it. Her lost memories and emotions were actually taken by Dominus, and not Albus, as Barlowe had told Shanoa. He also reveals that the reason he experimented on the villagers was because they were the last known descendants of the Belmont Clan, and he believed their blood would have the power to help him control Dominus without it consuming him.

Confronting Barlowe after learning the truth, Shanoa learns that his true objective is to bring Dracula back to life, using Shanoa as a sacrifice. After Barlowe is defeated in a fight, he offers his own life to revive Dracula, and Dracula's castle appears. Eventually confronting Dracula, Shanoa successfully defeats him using Dominus, seemingly at the cost of her own life. However, Albus appears and reveals that only a single soul has to be offered. He sacrifices his own soul in Shanoa's place, but not before he restores her memories and emotions and asks her to smile for him. The castle crumbles, and Shanoa escapes.

== Development ==
Order of Ecclesia was made by the team who developed Castlevania: Portrait of Ruin.

In a Wired interview, Igarashi said, "We're doing another Nintendo DS version. There hasn't been an official announcement, but we're doing it... we want people to enjoy the PSP version Castlevania: The Dracula X Chronicles, and afterwards we're announcing it. So, please wait a little bit". On January 25, 2008 a group of "leaked" screenshots from a DS Castlevania game that also showed Wii connectivity appeared. In response, Igarashi didn't give a direct answer if this was even the same game or said it was an official Konami product—he told IGN that "Konami doesn't comment on rumor or speculation." Eventually, it was confirmed by a later update that these were screenshots from Order of Ecclesia.

== Reception ==
Reception

Aggregate scores
Aggregator	Score
GameRankings	86%
Metacritic	85/100
OpenCritic	96% recommend(Dominus Collection)

Review scores
Publication	Score
1Up.com	A−
Edge	6/10
Famitsu	7/10, 8/10, 7/10, 8/10
Game Informer	8.25/10
GameSpot	8.5/10
GameSpy	4.5/5
GameTrailers	8.8/10
IGN	9/10
Nintendo World Report	9/10
Official Nintendo Magazine	92%

Castlevania: Order of Ecclesia received "favorable" reviews according to video game review aggregator Metacritic. Shane Bettenhausen called it a cross between Symphony of the Night and Simon's Quest, noting that the high difficulty level was balanced by the role-playing elements. Bettenhausen also commented about the quality of the game, despite the length, noting there are "3 or 4 levels of things to find." He concluded his experience with the game stating "It's all action-RPG oriented Castlevania at its best". He later awarded the game an A− for 1Up.com, stating that it "can still breathe new life into this long-running, often self-cannibalizing franchise." Game Informer's Tim Turi praised its gameplay and called it his favourite portable Castlevania title. Edge gave the game a mixed review, criticizing the excessive side quests. They wrote, "It is a shame that Konami so overinflates the experience through early chores". GameRevolution wrote positively of the combat, but felt that it was overall a weaker title compared to Castlevania: Dawn of Sorrow and the entries released on the Game Boy Advance.

Castlevania: Order of Ecclesia was awarded Best Nintendo DS Game by GameTrailers in their 2008 video game awards. It was also awarded the Best Platform Game for the Nintendo DS from IGN. It was also nominated for several other Nintendo DS-specific awards, including Best Graphics Technology, Best Original Score, and Game of the Year. However, following the nominations it won none of the awards.

During the 12th Annual Interactive Achievement Awards, the Academy of Interactive Arts & Sciences nominated Order of Ecclesia for "Hand-Held Game of the Year" and "Adventure Game of the Year".

Initial sales of the game in Japan were reported at 19,000 copies sold during its first week.

Shanoa has received generally positive reception following her appearance in Castlevania: Order of Ecclesia. She was included in Complex's list of the 50 greatest heroines in video games. The Mary Sue writer Jonathan Ore wrote an article praising Shanoa as an example of a female lead in a video game done well. He also praised her design, noting that she lacks overt sexualization while still being an attractive character. He notes that her backless dress feels racy without feeling vulgar, adding that while she at first may seem like a "superfluous, flimsy character disguised as a strong female character," she has agency in the story. He particularly finds her to be better than other Castlevania female characters such as Maria Renard, Sypha Belnades, and Charlotte Aulin, all of whom are secondary to the protagonist of their respective games. Writer Zachary Miller similarly felt that Shanoa was the first strong female lead in the series, excepting for Sonia Belmont, who was made non-canon by Igarashi. Destructoid's Jonathan Holmes called her a "woman with depth and purpose," praising her abilities while calling her "one of the most, if not the most, interesting Castlevania protagonists ever." GamesRadar awarded Shanoa with "sexiest new heroine" of 2008, praising her for being attractive without "shedding every last scrap of clothing." She was also praised as a rare example of a female Castlevania lead. Joystiq writer Candace Savino expressed excitement for her during the pre-release of Order of Ecclesia, calling her a "pretty badass character." Escapist Magazine writer Keane Ng however felt that she would not "spark a gender revolution in the ranks of videogame protagonists," but still felt that she was a unique protagonist in the series. Writer Phillip Willis felt that her amnesia made her stereotypical of other similar role-playing game characters. GameRevolution was more critical of this plot point, similarly criticizing it for being stereotypical while feeling that it makes Shanoa "completely unempathetic" and "cold and lifeless." The design and abilities of Bloodstained: Ritual of the Night protagonist Miriam has been compared to Shanoa's by outlets such as Hardcore Gamer.
