= Castlevania: Aria of Sorrow =

2003 video game

- North American box art
- Developer: Konami Computer Entertainment Tokyo
- Publisher: Konami
- Director: Junichi Murakami
- Producer: Koji Igarashi
- Programmer: Shutaro Iida
- Artist: Ayami Kojima
- Writer: Koji Igarashi
- Composers: Michiru Yamane; Takashi Yoshida; Soshiro Hokkai
- Series: Castlevania
- Platforms: Game Boy Advance; Mobile phone
- Release: Game Boy Advance: NA: May 6, 2003; JP: May 8, 2003; EU: May 9, 2003; Mobile: EU: 2008
- Genres: Action role-playing, Metroidvania
- Mode: Single-player

Castlevania: Aria of Sorrow (Note: Known in Japan as Castlevania: Akatsuki no Menuetto (Japanese: キャッスルヴァニア ～暁月(あかつき)の円舞曲(メヌエット)～, Hepburn: Kyassuruvania Akatsuki no Menuetto; lit. Castlevania: Minuet of Dawn)) is a 2003 action role-playing game developed by Konami Computer Entertainment Tokyo and published by Konami for the Game Boy Advance. It is the 20th main entry in the Castlevania series, as well as the third and final game produced for the system. Producer Koji Igarashi, who had led the production teams for previous Castlevania games, oversaw Aria of Sorrow's development in parallel with its predecessor Castlevania: Harmony of Dissonance (2002). Michiru Yamane returned to compose the music alongside Takashi Yoshida and Soshiro Hokkai. Director Junichi Murakami was new to the Castlevania series.

In contrast with other Castlevania titles taking place in the late medieval period or the early 20th century, Aria of Sorrow is set in 2035, decades after a climactic war resulted in Dracula's permanent demise and his castle being sealed in a solar eclipse. The plot follows the journey of Soma Cruz, a teenager granted occult powers, as he is trapped in the eclipse and encounters dark figures who wish to inherit Dracula's power. The game has been described as an action-adventure game with elements of role-playing games. Aria of Sorrow introduces several features to the series, such as the "Tactical Soul" system that enables Cruz to absorb the properties of defeated enemies, as well as a full New Game Plus mode.

Aria of Sorrow was released in May 2003. Although it sold poorly in Japan, selling 27,000 units nearly one month after its release, it was commercially successful in the United States, with more than 158,000 units sold in the three months following its release. Aria of Sorrow received universal acclaim, with praise for its visuals, gameplay (particularly the Tactical Soul System), music, and level design. Some critics considered it the best Castlevania game since Symphony of the Night (1997), as well as one of the best Game Boy Advance and Metroidvania genre games.

Konami released a sequel, Castlevania: Dawn of Sorrow, in August 2005 for the Nintendo DS. It incorporated many elements from its predecessor, including the "Tactical Soul" system. Aria of Sorrow was re-released on Nintendo's Virtual Console service for Wii U in October 2014 for North America, March 2015 for Europe and August 2015 for Japan; the game was subsequently included as part of the Castlevania Advance Collection on September 23, 2021 for the Nintendo Switch, PlayStation 4, Windows, and Xbox One alongside Castlevania: Circle of the Moon (2001), Harmony of Dissonance, and Castlevania: Dracula X (1995).

== Gameplay ==
An image of gameplay, with the primary character, Soma Cruz, using a soul to attack a pair of enemies

Aria of Sorrow features a 2D side-scrolling style of gameplay where the player controls the onscreen character from a third-person perspective. The game has been described as an action-adventure game with role-playing elements such as characters levelling-up each time they earn a set number of experience points from defeating enemies; each "level" gained increases the character's statistics, thus improving their performance in battle. Statistic examples include hit points, the amount of damage a character can receive; magic points, which determine the number of times a character can use magical attacks; strength, the power of a character's physical attacks; and intelligence, the power of a character's magical spells. Upon encountering an enemy, the player can use a variety of weapons to attack and defeat the enemy. Despite the game being set in 2035, the available weapons are largely medieval, including swords, axes, and spears; though a handgun is available. These weapons differ in their damage output, the range of the weapon, and the speed of the attack. Items and other accessories can be found by defeating enemies or by purchasing items from the game's shop.

Similar to previous games in the series, Aria of Sorrow is set within Dracula's castle, which is divided into several areas that the player traverses. These areas feature different components, such as different enemies, varying terrain characteristics, and a unique piece of theme music. Similar to most platform games, progression between areas is limited by the abilities the player has. While the method in which the player progresses through the game is initially linear, the player's options become more diverse as the number of character abilities increases.

=== Tactical Soul ===
Aria of Sorrow introduces the Tactical Soul ability system to the Castlevania series. It involves absorbing the souls of enemies in order to gain additional abilities. Save for a few exceptions, all types of enemies in the game can eventually yield a unique soul that can be absorbed by the player. The rate at which enemies' souls are obtained varies between enemies. Players can trade souls between two Aria of Sorrow cartridges using two Game Boy Advance consoles and a link cable.

Souls provide a variety of effects, and are separated into four categories: Bullet, Guardian, Enchant, and Ability souls. Bullet, Guardian, and Enchant souls are identified with the colors red, blue and yellow respectively, and the player can only have one of each type equipped at any given time. Bullet souls are Soma Cruz's replacement for sub weapons in this game, and enable the player to consume a set number of magic points to use an ability, often some form of projectile. Guardian souls provide continued effects, including transforming into mythical creatures and summoning familiars. Guardian souls continually drain magic points as long as they are active. Enchant souls are continuously active as long as they are equipped, and provide either an increase in statistics, or abilities such as the ability to walk on water. The fourth type, Ability souls, are treated differently from the other three types. They originate from one-of-a-kind enemies in the game, and once obtained, they remain active as long as the player does not specifically disable them, not consuming any magic points.

=== Additional modes ===
Aria of Sorrow includes additional modes of play that display elements not seen in the game's primary scenario. The New Game+ option allows a player that has completed the game to replay the game with all equipment, levels and souls the player had acquired in a previous file. Additionally, the player can opt to start the game in Hard Mode, offering the same gameplay at a higher difficulty level.

Two other modes offer alternatives to the standard gameplay. Boss Rush mode involves the player facing against all of the game's bosses in quick succession, and is unlocked after the player completes the game once. Julius Mode is an additional mode of play unlocked with the same method. The player takes control of Julius Belmont, the member of the Belmont clan featured in the game.

== Plot ==
=== Setting ===
Aria of Sorrow takes place in the fictional universe of the Castlevania series. The series' premise is the conflict between the vampire hunters of the Belmont clan and the immortal vampire Dracula. In 1999, thirty-six years before the start of Aria of Sorrow, Dracula was defeated once and for all by the Belmont clan, and his powers sealed into a solar eclipse. Shortly after Dracula's death, a prophecy was made that Dracula's reincarnation would come to his castle in 2035 and inherit all of his dark powers. This prophecy acts as the driving force behind the plot of Aria of Sorrow, and is the primary motivation of the supporting characters to be present. The game takes place in Dracula's castle, the most common setting for the series, with the castle divided into numerous areas that the player traverses over the course of the game.

=== Characters ===
The protagonist and primary playable character of Aria of Sorrow is Soma Cruz, a transfer student studying in Japan who possesses the "power of dominance", which allows him to absorb the souls of monsters and use their abilities. He is initially accompanied by his childhood friend, Mina Hakuba, the daughter of the priest of the Hakuba shrine. Over the course of the game, Soma meets additional characters that aid him in his quest: Genya Arikado, an enigmatic government agent and disguise for Alucard, the son of Dracula; Yoko Belnades, a witch and member of the Belnades clan; J, an amnesiac man drawn to Dracula's castle; and Hammer, a soldier from the military ordered to investigate the events occurring at Dracula's castle, although he abandons this mission and sets up a shop to sell Soma equipment (potions, weapons and the like). Graham Jones, a missionary who believes he is Dracula's reincarnation, serves as the game's antagonist.

The characters were designed by Ayami Kojima, who had previously worked on the characters in Castlevania games such as Castlevania: Symphony of the Night and Castlevania: Harmony of Dissonance. Due to the game being set in the future, Kojima's designs are notably more contemporary, utilizing modern clothing, in contrast to the medieval attire that characters from previous games wore.

Endings

The game has three distinct endings. The false ending is attained when Graham is defeated without having Flame Demon, Giant Bat, and Succubus Souls equipped. The true ending is attained when Graham is defeated with the souls attached. Soma then fights Julius and enters the chaotic realm, then defeats Chaos there. This causes the castle to crumble and Soma awakens safely outside with Mina. In the bad ending, Soma loses during his fight with Chaos, causing Dracula to consume his spirit. The scene shifts to him sitting on Dracula's throne where Julius arrives to kill him and fulfill his promise.

=== Story ===
The story begins in the year 2035, when Soma Cruz is visiting Japan as a transfer student and living near the Hakuba shrine. During a solar eclipse, he visits the Hakuba shrine with his childhood friend Mina Hakuba. He and Mina are then drawn into the eclipse, landing in a mysterious castle, where they meet a government agent named Genya Arikado. Arikado reveals that they are in Dracula's castle. After a group of monsters appear and are dispatched by Arikado, one of the monsters' souls is absorbed by Soma. Arikado explains this as the awakening of Soma's "power of dominance". Arikado then directs Soma to enter the castle and seek "the master's chamber".

As Soma proceeds through the castle, he confronts several characters, each present due to a prophecy related to Dracula's powers. Graham Jones, a missionary that has come to the castle, befriends Soma. Graham explains the nature of the castle and reveals that Dracula, long thought to be immortal, was destroyed for good in 1999, and that his powers will be passed down onto his reincarnation. When Soma proceeds further into the castle, he meets the witch Yoko Belnades, who is present on the orders of the Roman Catholic Church. Yoko is looking for Graham, who she believes is dangerous and the inheritor of Dracula's powers. She clarifies the nature of Soma's powers, revealing that they are not necessarily evil, but inherent to Soma himself. Later, Soma encounters Hammer, a member of the Army ordered to come to the Hakuba shrine. He has forfeited his mission, however, in favor of selling goods. He becomes Soma's vendor, selling numerous goods to aid Soma's mission. A mysterious man then accosts Soma, asking about the nature of Soma's dark power. When Soma continues to converse with him, the man reveals that he has amnesia, and the only thing he remembers is his name starts with "J".

Soma meets Graham again, and questions him on Yoko's suspicions. Graham claims he will receive Dracula's powers, believing himself to be Dracula's reincarnation as he was born on the day Dracula was slain. Graham inquires as to the nature of Soma's powers, to which Soma responds that he has "the power to rule," causing Graham to panic and flee. Concerned, Soma confides this incident to Yoko, who recommends that Soma join her in stopping Graham. As Soma proceeds further through the castle, he comes upon a scene of Graham stabbing Yoko with a knife. Graham retreats, and Yoko warns Soma of Graham's power. Arikado arrives, promises Soma he will look after Yoko, and demands that Soma pursue Graham. Soma meets "J" again, who reveals he is Julius Belmont, the man who defeated Dracula in 1999. As he leaves, he remarks that he knows something about the current situation, but does not elaborate.

Soma ascends to the castle's keep and confronts Graham in the throne room. Although Soma's sole desire is to leave the castle, Graham is convinced that Soma must be killed for absorbing the souls of the castle's monsters. Soma manages to defeat Graham, even after Graham uses his newfound powers to assume a demonic form. As Graham falls in defeat, Soma absorbs his powers, and realizes he is Dracula's reincarnation. Arikado arrives and reveals a way for Soma to save himself by halting the flow of chaos into the castle. Soma proceeds to the Chaotic Realm, but Julius attacks him, believing that Soma is Dracula. Julius allows Soma to defeat him, as he sensed Soma's soul fighting against Dracula's influence. Before he leaves, Soma elicits a promise from Julius to kill him if he fully becomes Dracula. Soma travels through the Chaotic Realm and finally locates the source of chaos. Soma manages to defeat the manifestation of chaos and is sent congratulations by Yoko, Hammer, Julius, and Arikado. Soma awakens back in the Hakuba Shrine with Mina, pleased that the conflict is over.

== Development ==
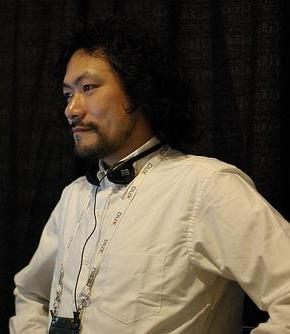
Producer Koji Igarashi, who led the production teams for previous Castlevania titles, led Aria of Sorrow's development.

Aria of Sorrow was unveiled at a press conference in San Francisco by executive producer Koji Igarashi on January 16, 2003. Igarashi had worked on previous Castlevania games such as Castlevania: Symphony of the Night and Castlevania: Harmony of Dissonance. Aria of Sorrow was placed in production alongside Harmony of Dissonance, resulting in both games sharing similar programming engines and gameplay elements. Aria of Sorrow's Ability souls, for example, provide the protagonist with innate abilities like the Relic items in Harmony of Dissonance. Nevertheless, Igarashi claimed he wished to try a "different route" for the series with Aria of Sorrow via placing the game in a futuristic setting. Ayami Kojima, who had previously collaborated with Igarashi on the character designs of Symphony of the Night and Harmony of Dissonance, was brought into the project. Following the "different route" motif, the character designs were made more contemporary, using modern clothing over the more medieval look of the previous Castlevania installments. In developing the game's back story, Igarashi partially based it on Nostradamus's prediction of a "big evil lord in 1999" and the 1999 solar eclipse in Eastern Europe.

One of Igarashi's prominent concerns during development was addressing the criticism expressed concerning Harmony of Dissonance. Igarashi noted that the music in Harmony of Dissonance had not been well received and Michiru Yamane, who had previously worked on the acclaimed music for Symphony of the Night, was hired in order to compose for Aria of Sorrow. The development team worked on the game's audio cycles, as well as delegating more cartridge space and processor cycles for the sound. Maintaining the visual quality of Harmony of Dissonance was a chief objective during development, as many reviewers had felt that Harmony of Dissonance had excelled in graphics at the cost of the audio quality. Furthermore, the staff tried to improve the series' gameplay system while retaining fan-favorite elements. Certain aspects that were missing in Harmony of Dissonance, such as hidden rooms and breakable walls, were incorporated into Aria of Sorrow. Igarashi added Soul trading via a link cable to assist players with collecting every soul in the game, which he believed would be difficult to accomplish alone.

== Reception ==
Reception

Aggregate scores
Aggregator	Score
Metacritic	91/100
OpenCritic	83% recommend(As part of the Advance Collection) (Note: Based on 23 reviews.)

Review scores
Publication	Score
1Up.com	B+
Eurogamer	9/10
Famitsu	36/40
Game Informer	9.25/10
GameSpot	8.6/10
GameSpy	4.5/5
IGN	9.3/10
RPGFan	90/100
RPGamer	4.5/5

Castlevania: Aria of Sorrow has received critical acclaim from several video game publications, with many comparing it to Castlevania: Symphony of the Night, widely considered the best game in the Castlevania series. Famitsu gave Aria of Sorrow a 36/40, the highest score any game in the Castlevania series has received from the publication. It was rated by Nintendo Power as the 22nd best game made on a Nintendo System in their Top 200 Games list. Official Nintendo Magazine called the game "Fang-tastic stuff", placing it 71st on a list of greatest Nintendo games. In Japan, the game sold 27,000 units one month after its release, considered to be a poor showing for a major video game franchise. Conversely, the game was significantly more successful in the United States, with more than 158,000 units in sales three months after its release.

As the third installment of the Castlevania series on the Game Boy Advance, many reviewers made note of the game's differences from its predecessors, Castlevania: Circle of the Moon and Castlevania: Harmony of Dissonance, with many considering it the definitive Castlevania game for the Game Boy Advance. GameSpy noted that Aria of Sorrow "managed to get just about everything right" as compared to its predecessors, and lauded it as "the best portable Castlevania game yet created." RPGFan claimed that Aria of Sorrow "[showcased] the true art of game development: to adapt and change as necessary yet remain consistent." RPGamer considered Aria of Sorrow one of the best games released for the Game Boy Advance.

In 2007 IGN ranked it as the second best Game Boy Advance game of all time. Game Informer's Tim Turi ranked it among the best Castlevania games on the Game Boy Advance. He praised its gameplay and visuals for setting a standard for future Castlevania games. GameZone ranked it as the seventh best Castlevania title and the best of the Game Boy Advance Castlevania titles.

The gameplay, specifically the Tactical Soul system, was a frequent subject of acclaim among reviewers. RPGFan called the Tactical Soul system "addictively fun", and GameSpot lauded the simplicity and depth of the gameplay. RPGamer considered the gameplay "one hundred percent solid," lauding the game's controls and interaction with enemies, as well as the Tactical Soul system. RPGFan asserted that the game had "a chance to be the most revered installment of the series, hardly caught in the shadow of Symphony of the Night like its predecessors." The game's length and difficulty were brought into question by several reviewers. GameSpot noted that a single play through the game would only last ten hours, and that the player grew "practically unstoppable" over the course of the game. RPGamer echoed this assessment, deriding the fact that the game "never [offered] much of a challenge", but noted that the "simplistic fun" of the gameplay rectified this.

The game's graphics and audio were widely praised by reviewers. RPGFan extolled the game's environments as "gorgeous and well layered," and noted while the game did not achieve the level of graphical quality set by Symphony of the Night, it "made a damn good attempt at it." GameSpy called the graphics "crisp, clear and colorful," with "good animation on easily viewable sprites." GameSpy additionally noted that the game's audio, a particularly lambasted feature of Harmony of Dissonance, was "fitting and well-composed." Prior to the game's release, IGN commented that the music was "pretty darn good." GameSpot, although labeling the music as "mostly forgettable," noted that it was far better than the audio of Harmony of Dissonance, and celebrated the individual audio used for enemies.

In terms of storyline and characters, RPGamer welcomed the characters' depth, and the emphasis placed into the personalities and development of supporting characters, asserting that previous Castlevania games ignored the development of the supporting characters in exchange for concentrating on the protagonist. IGN called the game's ending "incredibly unfulfilling and disappointing," but lauded the change from the conventional plot of a Castlevania game, in which a member of the Belmont clan defeats Dracula with the aid of a host of supporting characters. GameSpy criticized the presence of a "weak female who needs protection" and an "effeminate-looking man who does all the slaying" as stereotypical Castlevania elements, but noted that the "powerful and compelling scenario" the game had was the best in the series since Symphony of the Night.

== Sequel and re-release ==
Owing to the success of Aria of Sorrow, the production of Castlevania: Dawn of Sorrow, a rare sequel in the Castlevania series, was announced on January 6, 2005. In an interview, Koji Igarashi noted that he felt that the Tactical Soul system used in Aria of Sorrow, as well as the storyline with Soma Cruz, were a waste to use in only one game, and contributed to his desire to make a sequel. As such, the Tactical Soul system was reintroduced in the sequel Dawn of Sorrow, as well as several new developments, such as an anime character design, as Ayami Kojima was not part of the production staff for Dawn of Sorrow. Though Aria of Sorrow was successful, its sales figures failed to meet expectations and prompted the switch to anime-style designs. In 2005, Igarashi expressed a desire to develop a game centered on the battle between Julius Belmont and Dracula, but commented that the project would be dependent on available production time.

On November 3, 2005, Aria of Sorrow was re-released as part of Konami's "Konami the Best" line in Japan. It was re-released, along with Harmony of Dissonance, in the Castlevania: Double Pack in North America on January 11, 2006. A scaled-down version for mobile phones by Glu Mobile was released in 2008 in Europe. It features loading times and reduced animations to accommodate its smaller file size, but retains most of the original game's locations and mechanics.
