= Ayami Kojima =

Japanese artist

- 小島 文美
- Born: Tokyo, Japan
- Occupation: Artist
- Known for: Character design, illustration
- Notable work: Castlevania series

Ayami Kojima (小島 文美, Kojima Ayami) is a Japanese artist. She has often worked in video games as a character designer and is most known for her work on the Castlevania series of video games with Konami. She is self-taught and enjoys reading shōnen manga.

== Biography ==
Ayami Kojima is a self-taught artist, born in Tokyo, Japan. She started by drawing doujinshi in her spare time and selling them at Comiket under the pen name Odile Kuronuma. She then made illustrations for novels by Hideyuki Kikuchi. Her first work in the video game industry was Castlevania: Symphony of the Night which released in 1997. In the few years following Symphony of the Night's release, she worked on several more entries in the Castlevania series, including Castlevania Chronicles in 2001, Harmony of Dissonance in 2002, and Aria of Sorrow and Lament of Innocence in 2003. In the mid-to-late 2000s, Kojima worked on games such as Castlevania: Curse of Darkness, Samurai Warriors 3, Sangokushi TCG, Castlevania: The Dracula X Chronicles, Dynasty Warriors 7, Dynasty Warriors 8, and Castlevania: Harmony of Despair.

Kojima's work schedule slowed during the 2010s, though she returned to the Castlevania series for the 2019 mobile title Grimoire of Souls. Also in 2019, a spiritual successor to Symphony of the Night titled Bloodstained: Ritual of the Night was released, with several former key Castlevania staff members involved. Kojima stated she could "only offer a small amount of time" for the project, and illustrated the packaging artwork for physical copies given to certain Kickstarter backers.

== Style ==
Kojima's style is influenced by classical artists such as Tawaraya Sōtatsu and Tsukioka Yoshitoshi. Media which Kojima has often employed in paintings include the use of molding paste, Conté Crayon, acrylics, India ink, gloss polymer medium, stumps and finger smudging. The process involves laying out the sketch and composition using the Conté crayon. Shadows are darkened monochromatically using both Conté and India ink. The color composition is then blocked in using diluted acrylics. The three-dimensional textured aspects in the majority of her paintings are created using molding paste and a palette knife. During the addition of stronger colors additional water and the artists' fingers (smudging) are used to create the glowing gradiation which is apparent in much of Kojima's artwork. Once the base paint is finished, metallic paints are applied with a palette knife. Glows and highlights are enhanced using a gloss polymer medium.

== Works ==
=== Video games ===
- Castlevania: Symphony of the Night (Konami, 1997)
- Söldnerschild (Koei, 1998)
- Chou-Denki Card Battle: Youfu Makai - Kikuchi Shuugyou (Koubunsha, 1999)
- Castlevania Chronicles (Konami, 2001)
- Castlevania: Harmony of Dissonance (Konami, 2002)
- Castlevania: Aria of Sorrow (Konami, 2003)
- Castlevania: Lament of Innocence (Konami, 2003)
- Castlevania: Curse of Darkness (Konami, 2005)
- Castlevania: The Dracula X Chronicles (Konami, 2007)
- Samurai Warriors 3 Artbook (Koei, 2009)
- Castlevania: Harmony of Despair (Konami, 2010)
- Dynasty Warriors 7 Artbook (Koei, 2011)
- Bloodstained: Ritual of the Night Artwork Packaging (ArtPlay, 2019)
- Castlevania: Grimoire of Souls (Konami, 2019)

=== Art books ===
- Santa Lilio Sangre (2010) (ISBN 4-87031-923-3)

Books

- Alexandrite (Shikiko Yamaai, 2006)
- Island of Depraved Angels(堕天使の島)(Yama Ai Himeko, 2011)
- Shikisai Oukoku vol. 3(1999)

=== Additional Works ===
- Sorin the Mirthless Magic the Gathering Card, (Collector Number: 297, Released: 2021-11-19)
