= List of vampire video games =

This is an incomplete list of video games which strongly feature vampires. This includes games where the player character is a vampire, or where a vampire is the primary antagonist, as well as games which feature vampires as the primary enemy variant. Games which feature dhampirs, half-vampires, in the same way are also included.

== Games ==
Name	Release date	Platform	Description	Ref.
Marvel's Blade	TBA	TBA	Action-adventure game developed by Arkane Studios where the archetypical role of evil vampire protagonist is reverted with the vampire hunter (and benevolent vampire) Eric Brooks, as he fights a vampire invasion taking place on Paris while struggling with his own vampiric identity. It is based on the Marvel Comics character Blade.	
Harrowed World: Portents In Red	TBA	Windows	Role-playing video game currently in development set in the gothic horror Harrowed World setting, where the player controls their own unnamed vampiric protagonist in the fictional island city of the Isle of Gallow. Its visuals and gameplay draw inspiration from Vampire: The Masquerade – Bloodlines.	
Vampires: Bloodlord Rising	TBA (Early Access 2026)	Windows	Open-world adventure game set in a dark fantasy universe where players take on the role of a vampire lord. The game combines elements of role-playing, crafting, and survival within the gothic setting of Sangavia.	
Vampire: The Masquerade – Eternal Whispers	TBA	Windows	First Disco Elysium-inspired, narrative-driven role-playing video game set in ithe World of Darkness universe. Gabe, the vampiric protagonist, awakens in the modern city of Montreal after decades of torpor, where he is to find out about his origins.	
Vampire: The Masquerade – Heartless Symphony	TBA	Windows	Based in the World of Darkness universe, is a role-playing video game that narrates the subsequent events to Vampire: The Masquerade – Heartless Lullaby, made by its same developer Entalto Studios.	
Vampire Syndicate: Gangs of MoonFall	TBA (Early Access 2026)	Windows	Erotic cyberpunk CRPG set in a metropolis dominated by a vampire gang war, with the protagonist being a key part of the conflict. It is partly inspired by Shadowrun.	
Bloody Hell Hotel	2027	Windows	A hotel management simulation game where the player controls a vampire who has awoken from a centuries-long coma to find their old estate has fallen into ruin and decides to turn it into a prosperous hotel.	
Dracula: The Disciple	2027	Windows, PlayStation 5, Xbox Series X/S	Upcoming first-person adventure game where players assume the role of Emile Valombres, a French archivist suffering from an incurable disease whose search for a cure leads him to Count Dracula's castle in Transylvania. The game allows players to inspect and combine objects, and perform alchemical experiments and rituals to solve puzzles.	
The Duskbloods	2027	Nintendo Switch 2	Multiplayer action role-playing game developed by FromSoftware, featuring player versus player (PvP) and player versus environment (PvE) gameplay with up to eight players. Every player chooses from a wide selection of vampire-like characters called Bloodsworn, and compete in different locations utilizing a curated set of combat tools and abilities.	
Hunter: The Reckoning – Deathwish	Q3 2027	Windows, PlayStation 5, Xbox Series X/S	Action-horror role-playing game set in the World of Darkness universe. Set in New York City, said metropolis is afflicted by supernatural occurrences, where the player leads a squad of hunters who investigate occult crimes, confront various supernatural threats, and make decisions that affect the outcome of different story missions. It draws direct inspiration from Vampire: The Masquerade – Bloodlines and Baldur's Gate 3.	
Castlevania: Belmont's Curse	2026-10-15	Windows, PlayStation 5, Xbox Series X/S, Nintendo Switch	Action-adventure video game, 26th main entry in the Castlevania series and latest entry in the franchise since Castlevania: Lords of Shadow 2 (2014). It takes place in the late 15th century and over twenty years after the events of Castlevania III: Dracula's Curse (1989) and Castlevania: Curse of Darkness (2005).	
Nighthawks	2026-09-22	Windows, macOS, Linux	Visual novel by adventure game developer Wadjet Eye Games. Based in a dark city where the player gradually builds a nightclub through fear and the actions inherent to the world of vampires.	
The Blood of Dawnwalker	2026-09-03	Windows, PlayStation 5, Xbox Series X/S	Dark fantasy action role-playing game set in 14th-century middle southern Europe. First work by the studio Rebel Wolves, founded in 2022 by Konrad Tomaszkiewicz, one of the lead directors of The Witcher 3: Wild Hunt and head of production for Cyberpunk 2077. Coen, the protagonist, is cursed from vampirism and suffers from silver poisoning. He has 30 days to save his family. His connection with his ill sister, Lunka, reflects the plot's themes of survival, morality, and the search for power.	
Moonlight Peaks	2026-07-07	Windows, Switch 2, Switch	Life simulation video game set in the titular supernatural town, where the player can manage their own farm, learn spells and potion crafting, and interact with their non-human neighbors, some of them being vampires, werewolves, and mermaids.	
Blood High!	2026-05-22	Windows	Retro-inspired first-person shooter where players control a vampiric protagonist whose head is physically separated from their body; core mechanics include using blood as a ranged weapon, deploying their head as both an offensive tool and for regeneration, and activating the temporary Blood High state when the player accumulates enough blood.	
Legacy of Kain: Defiance Remastered	2026-03-03	Windows, PlayStation 4, PlayStation 5, Xbox One, Xbox Series X/S, Nintendo Switch, Nintendo Switch 2	Action-adventure game and a remastered version of Legacy of Kain: Defiance, fifth entry in the Legacy of Kain video game series as well as its last entry until the franchise's revival with Legacy of Kain: Soul Reaver 1 & 2 Remastered's launch.	
Real Vampires	2025-10-31	Windows, macOS, iOS, Android	Narrative-driven adventure game that blends dark humor, eerie poetry, and authentic Slavic vampire folklore into a unique interactive experience. Inspired by Dr. Łukasz Kozak's haunting anthology With Stake and Spade: Vampiric Diversity in Poland.	
Vampire: The Masquerade – Bloodlines 2	2025-10-21	Windows, PlayStation 5, Xbox Series X/S	21st century-themed vampire action role-playing game taking place in Seattle, and a spiritual successor to Vampire: The Masquerade – Bloodlines. It is based on the tabletop role-playing game Vampire: The Masquerade and set in the World of Darkness fictional universe.	
Cabernet	2025-02-20	Windows, PlayStation 4, PlayStation 5, Xbox One, Xbox Series X/S, Nintendo Switch	Role-playing game set in a 19th century Eastern-European city. The game follows Liza, a vampire who must do various quests in order to advance in vampiric society. The game is combat-free, instead giving Liza different knowledge-based traits to succeed in dialogue.	
Legacy of Kain: Soul Reaver 1 & 2 Remastered	2024-12-10	Windows, PlayStation 4, PlayStation 5, Xbox One, Xbox Series X/S, Nintendo Switch	Video game compilation containing the remastered versions of Legacy of Kain: Soul Reaver (1999) and Soul Reaver 2 (2001), both entries in the Legacy of Kain franchise.	
Priest Simulator: Vampire Show	2024-12-05	Windows	Satirical game set in fictional Polish town of San de Ville. The protagonist, named Orlok, is a vampire who becomes a priest. The player is tasked with renovating a dilapidated church, battling demonic forces, performing confessions, and taking on absurd side quests. The game combines basic combat with simulation elements, allowing players to upgrade weapons, unlock abilities, and earn points through tasks like cleaning and rebuilding the church.	
Vampire Hunters	2024-10-30	Windows, PlayStation 5, PlayStation 4, Xbox Series X/S, Xbox One	Roguelike first-person shooter based in a steampunk version of Transylvania, where the player is faced with hordes of undead enemies (vampires, zombies, demons). The game features the ability of using up to fourteen weapons at the same time.	
Silent Slayer: Vault of the Vampire	2024-10-10	Quest (2, 3), Windows	Virtual reality game where the player is tasked with disarming the safety mechanisms of diverse vampire coffins, with the final task being eliminating the vampire that rests in it with a stake to the heart. If the player fails to disarm a coffin in silence, they could be met with a warning by the resting vampire, or given a Game Over, urging the player to be as cautious and patient as possible while manipulating it.	
Vampire: The Masquerade – Reckoning of New York	2024-09-10	Windows, PlayStation 5, PlayStation 4, Xbox Series X/S, Xbox One, Switch	Sequel to Vampire: The Masquerade – Shadows of New York, and belonging to the World of Darkness fictional universe. Set in modern-day New York City, it explores the life of a vampire (Kindred) as they clash in a world of political intrigue, hidden conspiracies, and supernatural dilemma. The game emphasizes storytelling, personal conflict, and the eternal struggle to maintain one's humanity while embracing a cursed immortality.	
Vampire Therapist	2024-07-19	Windows	Adventure game with a text-based approach, mixing humor, introspection, and gothic charm. Players take on the role of Sam, a former cowboy turned vampire, undergoing therapy with Andromachos, a 3,000-year-old reformed assassin-turned-therapist. Both characters explore the psychological struggles of being undead, delving into themes like immortality and personal growth.	
EvilEvil	2024-07-16	Windows, PlayStation 5, Xbox Series X/S	Cooperative first-person shooter in which players embody powerful vampires with unique abilities, battling through hordes of enemies in a dark, action-packed narrative. The story revolves around confronting the evil plans of Zagreus and his cultists. Players can team up with two other vampires or tackle the challenges solo.	
Harrowed World: What's Past Is Portents	2024-06-11	Windows, Mac, Linux	A visual novel about vampires set inside the Harrowed World setting, acting as a prelude to Harrowed World: Portents In Red.	
V Rising	2024-05-08	Windows	The player awakens as a vampire and hunts for blood in nearby settlements, raises a castle, and gain allies online to conquer the land of the living.	
The Inquisitor	2024-02-08	Windows, PlayStation 5, Xbox Series X/S	Dark fantasy, action-adventure game based on the Inquisitor book series by Jacek Piekara, set in an alternate historical reality where Jesus Christ, instead of dying on the cross, survives and seeks vengeance, leading to a ruthless and violent version of Christianity.	
Vampire: The Masquerade – Justice	2024-02-06	Meta Quest 2, Meta Quest 3	Second virtual reality game officially based in the World of Darkness universe. The game is an open-ended narrative RPG focused on stealth, unlike previous entries in the Vampire: The Masquerade video game series.	
El Paso, Elsewhere	2023-09-26	Windows	Supernatural neo-noir third-person shooter where the player must defeat diverse monsters, such as vampires, werewolves and fallen angels.	
Renfield: Bring Your Own Blood	2023-09-20	Windows	Horror roguelike shoot 'em up based on the film Renfield and inspired on Vampire Survivors. The game, which features pixel art visuals, lets the player choose between R.M. Renfield, the protagonist from the 1897 Dracula novel, the titular villain, or the unique characters exclusive to the game, as they battle hordes of enemies and collect vampiric upgrades and abilities.	
Redfall	2023-05-02	Windows, Xbox Series X/S	Open world first-person shooter where four characters fight against a city infested by vampires and other humans. The game is influenced by the Left 4 Dead series, features both single-player and cooperative multi-player modes.	
Vampire Slayer: The Resurrection	2023-02-09	Windows, PlayStation 4, Switch	Asymmetric multiplayer first-person shooter with a focus on team competition: each player either chooses the role of a vampire or slayer, with every team battling against each other in quick matches where the remaining one standing earns the victory after every opposing player is defeated.	
Immortality	2022-08-30	Windows, PlayStation 5, macOS, Xbox Series X/S, iOS, Android	Interactive film video game where the player analyses found footage to determine the fate of a missing person. The content features immortal beings who are said to have been the inspiration for vampire myths and exhibit many vampiric traits.	
Vampire: The Masquerade – Swansong	2022-05-19	Windows, PlayStation 5, PlayStation 4, Xbox Series X/S, Xbox One, Switch	Narrative-driven role-playing video game in which the player controls three vampires with different vampiric disciplines (abilities), switching between them over the course of the game. The player can customize the characters by choosing to upgrade their disciplines and character statistics to suit their preferred playstyle; this influences character interaction and skills used while exploring the game world.	
Vampire: The Masquerade – Bloodhunt	2022-04-27	Windows, PlayStation 5	First multiplayer game based in the Vampire: The Masquerade universe, presented in a battle royale format. Every match takes place in Prague, where players, as vampiric beings, fight for survival to be the only one remaining .	
Vampire: The Masquerade – Heartless Lullaby	2022-04-21	Windows	Covering just the prologue of the story, with well over an hour and a half of gameplay and several different endings, Vampire: The Masquerade – Heartless Lullaby was created in less than a month in celebration of the Vampire: The Masquerade Jam.	
Red Embrace: Mezzanine	2021-07-09	Windows	Visual novel / point-and-click game produced by Argento Studios in preparation for their subsequent role-playing game title Red Embrace: Paradisus	
Vampirem	2021-05-20	Windows	Another story of Bloodlust, this time told through the eyes of Ravenblood. His journey in search of lost strength and revenge goes through the dark tombs and dungeons of the Vampirem. Released on Steam.	
Vampire: The Masquerade: Night Road	2020-09-24	Windows, MacOS, Linux, Android, IOS	Text-based adventure game set in the Vampire: The Masquerade universe. Players take on the role of an elite vampire courier, tasked with delivering secrets while evading hunters, rival couriers, and the dangers of the rising sun. The game explores themes of secrecy, survival, and power, allowing players to make choices that shape their character's fate.	
Vampire: The Masquerade – Shadows of New York	2020-09-10	Windows, Mac, Linux, PlayStation 4, Xbox One, Switch	Visual novel that takes place in the World of Darkness universe, also sequel to Vampire: The Masquerade – Coteries of New York.	
Immortal Realms: Vampire Wars	2020-08-28	Windows, Mac, Linux, PlayStation 4, Xbox One, Switch	Turn-based strategy and 4X hybrid developed by Palindrome Interactive. Set in a gothic fantasy world dominated by vampire factions, the player commands armies and manages resources, expands territory, and engages in tactical battles while pursuing faction-specific objectives and campaign narratives.	
Bloodlust 2: Nemesis	2020-03-26	Windows	Hack-n-slash action role-playing game, sequel to the vampire-themed Bloodlust – Shadowhunter.	
Vampire: The Masquerade – Coteries of New York	2019	Windows, Mac, Linux, PlayStation 4, Xbox One, Switch	A narrative experience set in the rich universe of Vampire: The Masquerade 5th Edition. It presents the struggle for power between two vampiric factions – the Camarilla and the Anarchs – in New York City.	
Code Vein	2019	Windows, PlayStation 4, Xbox One	Action role-playing game developed by Bandai Namco Entertainment. Set in a post-apocalyptic world where player-controlled revenants hunt monstrous creatures, the game emphasizes third-person combat, character customization, cooperative multiplayer, and narrative-driven missions.	
Vampyr	2018	Windows, Switch, PlayStation 4, Xbox One	The plot revolves around vampire doctor Jonathan Reid who is coming to terms with his undead condition. He must deal with being torn between the Hippocratic Oath and his newfound bloodthirsty nature. Vampyr is based on the 1918 London Spanish flu pandemic.	
Vampire – The Masquerade: We Eat Blood	2017-02-16	Windows, MacOS, Linux, Android, IOS	Text-based adventure game set in the Vampire: The Masquerade universe. It follows the player during their first nights as a vampire. As they adjust to their new existence, they must make choices that affect their relationship with human society and the supernatural world. The narrative explores themes of adaptation, survival, and morality, requiring players to decide whether to retain their humanity or embrace their vampiric nature.	
Bloodlust – Shadowhunter	2015	Windows	Dungeon crawling / action RPG experience that immerses players in the dark underworld of a forgotten society of Vampires and their disciplines, all while trying to battle for hierarchy among the clans in search of their sire.	
Nosgoth	2015-01	Windows (Open beta)	It was a free-to-play multiplayer action game and a spin-off from the Legacy of Kain video game series, taking place in its eponymous universe. Nosgoth employed a player versus player system in which each match consisted of two rounds, with teams being composed of opposing characters: vampires and humans. In each round, teams would switch to control the opposing race, and the team which accumulated the most points by fighting their counterparts won the match.	
Immortal Day	2014	Windows, Mobile	An online multiplayer game where players can play as vampires, werewolves, hunters, hybrids, and hybrid zombies.	
Castlevania: Lords of Shadow 2	2014	Windows, PlayStation 3, Xbox 360	Action-adventure game with hack and slash combat and direct sequel to Castlevania: Lords of Shadow, to date the last major entry in the Castlevania series.	
Blood Knights	2013-11-01	Windows, PlayStation 3, Xbox 360	Action RPG game following the story of a long conflict between vampires and humans as it evolves into an age of endless war. The game features two playable characters: the vampire hunter Jeremy, and Alysa, a female vampire, with both working together in a mission to retrieve an ancient artifact, the Blood Seal, to protect it from an army of vampires.	
Dark	2013-07-03	Windows, Xbox 360	A stealth action RPG that follows Eric Bane, a newly turned vampire suffering from amnesia, who must recover his memories by drinking the blood of ancient vampires.	
Vampires!	2012	Windows, Mac, Mobile	Strategy game from indie developers CBE Software. Later renamed as Crazy Vampires as part of the Android release and later renamed as Vampires: Lead Them to Safety!	
Vampire Season – Monster Defense	2012	iOS	Tower defense/strategy video game. Vampire Season features gameplay with elements from both the tower defense and real-time strategy genres. Players are tasked with building up an army of boogiemen, zombies, vampires and other creatures, all in the name of protecting Dracula's coffin.	
Legacy of Kain: Dead Sun	Canceled (2012)	Windows, PlayStation 4, PlayStation 3, Xbox 360	Latest title in the Legacy of Kain series (even though never released) as well as the second entry to be canceled after 2004's Legacy of Kain: The Dark Prophecy.	
World of Darkness	Canceled (2012)	Windows	Long-running project developed from 2006 to 2014 by CCP Games before its cancellation. It was to be a non-linear, social-oriented MMO based in its titular universe.	
BloodRayne: Betrayal	2011	Windows, PlayStation 3, Xbox 360	Side-scrolling platform game that keeps the hack and slash combat of the previous games in the series. The player controls Rayne through fifteen individual levels.	
The Adventures of Shuggy	2011	Xbox 360, Windows	A platform and puzzle game where players guide the diminutive titular vampire around an inherited mansion in order to remove unwanted guests. Released on Xbox Live Arcade.	
Infamous 2: Festival of Blood	2011	PlayStation 3	A PlayStation Network downloadable game. This standalone spin-off of Infamous 2 sees the player character Cole MacGrath bitten by a vampire, he must defeat the head vampire before the end of the night.	
Vampire Rush	2011	iOS, Bada	Tower Defense/Survival Horror video game. An adventurer Captain Greg defends the gates, the last barrier that protects the humans from the vampires.	
Transformice	2010	Windows, Mac, Linux	Multiplayer free-to-play platform video game. Vampires appear in the survivor game mode, where players must run to avoid being bitten by them.	
Castlevania: Lords of Shadow	2010	Windows, PlayStation 3, Xbox 360	Third-person action-adventure game and turning point in the Castlevania series upon modernizing the titular franchise in favour of a mainstream audience. It received a sequel in 2014, which as of 2023 is the latest Castlevania game.	
NecroVisioN	2009	Windows	A video game set during World War I, which featured vampires, zombies, and demons at the same time.	
Buffy the Vampire Slayer: Sacrifice	2009	Nintendo DS	Beat 'em up horror video game based on the supernatural TV series Buffy the Vampire Slayer. It takes place after the show's seventh season, with a story written by Rob Des Hotel, one of the series' writers. Players control Buffy as she battles vampires, demons, and other supernatural foes using a mix of melee combat and first-person shooter mechanics.	
A Vampyre Story	2008	Mac OS X, Windows	Comedy graphic adventure starring Mona De Lafitte, a young opera singer who wishes to travel back to Paris and resume her career, despite having recently been converted into a vampire.	
Castlevania: Order of Ecclesia	2008	Nintendo DS	Last mainline video game of the Castlevania series. The plot involves the vampire-hunting protagonist Shanoa, who is a vital member of an organization set to defeat Dracula after another vampire-hunting clan, the Belmonts, has vanished without a trace.	
Dracula: Origin	2008	Windows	Graphic adventure starring Abraham Van Helsing, who must prevent Count Dracula from finding a manuscript that will allow him to bring the woman he loved back from the dead.	
Dracula 3: The Path of the Dragon	2008	iOS, Windows	Graphic adventure, a priest named Father Arno Moriani travels to Transylvania to research a candidate for sainthood, eventually resulting in a fight with Count Dracula.	
Night of the Raving Dead	2008	Wii, Windows, Xbox 360	An episode of the adventure series Sam & Max Season Two. The titular detective duo's town is under siege by an army of zombies under the control of an emo vampire named Jurgen.	
Fortune Arterial	2008	Windows	Japanese erotic visual novel, a male student who has newly transferred to a remote island school discovers that one of the female students is a vampire.	
Harker	Canceled (2008)	PlayStation 3, Wii, Xbox 360	Survival horror game where players control Jonathan Harker and must track one or more vampires through the game's environments before engaging in small-scale combat with regenerating vampires. The game was put on indefinite hold when the design team The Collective merged with Shiny Entertainment to form Double Helix Games, the game was shelved so that Double Helix could produce Silent Hill: Homecoming.	
Vampire Rain	2007-01-25 (JP)	PlayStation 3, Xbox 360	Stealth game set in the modern day. A special operative stalks and sets ambushes for vampires.	
Mystic Nights	2005-10-20	PlayStation 2	Action role-playing video game developed by defunct Korean developer Asteron Studio. Players assume the role of a sorcerer who explores realms to recover lost fragments of an ancient grimoire, using a real-time combat system that blends melee attacks with elemental spellcasting. The game was long believed lost until 2018, when video game enthusiast Chris Pruett discovered a single legitimate copy in Seoul, South Korea.	
Darkwatch	2005-08-16	PlayStation 2, Xbox	First-person shooter in a Wild West setting. A newly turned vampire must hunt down the one responsible for the transformation before he loses the last vestiges of humanity.	
Vampire: The Masquerade – Bloodlines	2004-11-16	Windows	Based on the tabletop role-playing game Vampire: The Masquerade and set in the World of Darkness fictional universe, this game is a hybrid between first-person shooter and role-playing game, pitting the player's newly turned vampire character against armies both mortal and monstrous, as well as the diabolical politics of undead society.	
BloodRayne 2	2004-10-12	PlayStation 2, Xbox, Windows	Sequel to the 2002 action/hack and slash game Bloodrayne. Instead of resuming the story where the earlier entry ended, it takes place in a contemporary setting, during the 2000s, while featuring the same protagonist.	
Van Helsing	2004-05-07	Game Boy Advance, PlayStation 2, Xbox	Based on the film, the titular vampire hunter battles Dracula and his brides along with other foes.	
Hunter: The Reckoning – Redeemer	2003-10-28	Xbox	Third game in the Hunter: The Reckoning video game series. Hack and slash and third-person shooter game based on a gothic-punk world, where diverse undead creatures live in hiding from the rest of society. The player faces hordes of enemies, either solo or in company of up to three more players.	
Nosferatu: The Wrath of Malachi	2003-10-21	Windows	First-person perspective game with randomly generated levels. Set in 1912, the son of a Romanian count must fend off attacks from vampires by using traditional vampire hunting equipment as well as flintlock and musket weapons.	
Buffy the Vampire Slayer: Chaos Bleeds	2003-08-26	PlayStation 2, Xbox, GameCube	Second and last video game based in the titular television series to be released on home consoles.	
Buffy the Vampire Slayer: Wrath of the Darkhul King	2003-06-24	Game Boy Advance	Action-platformer for the Game Boy Advance, and the third of six video games based on the supernatural TV series Buffy the Vampire Slayer. Set during the show's fourth season, the game follows Buffy Summers as she attempts to stop a demonic warlord from triggering an apocalyptic event. Players control Buffy through 16 levels, solving puzzles and battling enemies using customizable weapons.	
BloodRayne	2002-10-31	GameCube, Mac OS X, PlayStation 2, Windows, Xbox	Third-person action games with emphasis on combat, the titular character is a dhampir who destroys vampires and other supernatural beings.	
Blade II	2002-09-03	PlayStation 2, Xbox	Third-person perspective beat 'em up, tie-in video game to the titular film, also second title in the Blade video game franchise.	
Buffy the Vampire Slayer	2002-08-19	Xbox	First entry of the Buffy series to be released for home consoles, following the launch of the Game Boy Color title with the same name in 2000.	
Hunter: The Reckoning	2002-05-21	Xbox, GameCube	First game of the titular tabletop role-playing game to be adapted into a video game. It features a hack and slash consisting on defeating hordes of undead enemies.	
Embodiment of Scarlet Devil	2002-08-11 (JP)	Windows	Bullet hell game where the main antagonists, Remilia and Flandre Scarlet, are vampires.	
From Dusk till Dawn	2001-10-04	Windows	First-person shooter set after the events of the 1996 film. A vampire slayer must battle fellow prisoners who have become undead aboard a prison ship.	
Dark Angel: Vampire Apocalypse	2001-07-13	PlayStation 2	A vampire named Anna has a year to defeat the army of the Shadow Lord before facing him in combat, the title's gameplay has been compared to Gauntlet and Diablo.	
Soul Reaver 2	2001-10-30	PlayStation 2, Windows	Action-adventure game, third in the Legacy of Kain series.	
Tsukihime	2000-12-29	Windows	Adult visual novel in which main character Shiki Tohno becomes involved in a conflict between vampires after meeting one pursuing a rogue of her own kind.	
Blade	2000-11-21	Game Boy Color, PlayStation	Third-person action game based on the film which was developed from the comic book character.	
Buffy the Vampire Slayer	2000-09-19	Game Boy Color	First video game based on the television series Buffy the Vampire Slayer.	
Dracula 2: The Last Sanctuary	2000-09-25	PlayStation, Windows	Graphic adventure and sequel to Dracula: Resurrection. Jonathan Harker continues to pursue Dracula and tries to save his wife Mina.	
Vampire Night	2000-03-01	Arcade, PlayStation 2	Light gun game starring two vampire hunters who are attempting to defeat a vampire named Auguste.	
Vampire: The Masquerade – Redemption	2000-06-07	Mac OS, Windows	Players control a vampire along with a party of up to three others, in this third-person 3D role-playing game featuring combat against werewolves, other vampires and several other types of foe, as well as a storyline that has players exploring towns from Dark Ages-era Prague to modern day New York.	
Legacy of Kain: Soul Reaver	1999	Windows, PlayStation, Dreamcast	Action-adventure game and immediate sequel to Blood Omen: Legacy of Kain. It is the first entry in the series to feature real-time 3D graphics, with the ability of the player to switch between two different dimensions or realities: the material realm and the spectral realm.	
Countdown Vampires	1999	PlayStation	Survival horror, a policeman acting as security during the opening of a horror-themed casino is faced with numerous vampires when the building's fire sprinkler system is activated and sprays black water over everyone present, transforming them.	
Dracula: Resurrection	1999	Mac OS X, PlayStation, Windows	Graphic adventure set seven years after the events of Dracula. Jonathan Harker returns home to find his wife Mina gone and a note left stating that she has returned to Transylvania.	
Vampire Hunter D	1999	PlayStation	Action adventure game, a master vampire hunter Dhampiris must explore a mansion and rescue a kidnap victim.	
Vampir – Kyuuketsuki Densetsu	1999	PlayStation	Action RPG game. Playing as a vampire named Christopher, the player earns the trust of humans during the day in order to suck their blood at night. The ultimate goal is to raise an army and defeat the evil vampire Duran. Released only in Japan. Developed by Artdink.	
Gothos	1997	Windows, Mac	Point-and-click adventure game where players assume the role of a newly embraced vampire navigating a world where diverse vampire clans are gathering. The primary objective is to locate the Scrolls of The First Blood and return them to their coven before The Deceiver, the antagonist, can acquire them. The game draws heavily from the Vampire: The Masquerade tabletop role-playing game	
Blood Omen: Legacy of Kain	1996	PlayStation, Windows	First work in the Legacy of Kain franchise: a 2D action-adventure game portrayed from a top-down perspective where the player controls a vampiric protagonist named Kain, Blood Omen features diverse hack and slash combat, puzzle-solving, and dungeon crawl-based situations.	
The Vampire Diaries	1996	Windows	Point-and-click adventure game horror game, released in 1996 by HeR Interactive and featuring live-action actors and footage. Teenager Elena Gilbert must discover who is the culprit of attacking her little sister in an art gallery, before there are other victims in Fells Church.	
Bureau 13	1995	Windows	Graphic adventure where the player is part of a fictional top-secret government agency which investigates and combats supernatural events. Each agent has his/her own special abilities.	
Nosferatu	1994	SNES	In this action platform game, the player controls Kyle in his quest to rescue his girlfriend Erin from Nosferatu's clutches.	
Bram Stoker's Dracula	1993	Amiga, DOS, Game Boy, Game Gear, Master System, Mega Drive, Mega-CD, NES, SNES	Games based on the film, players control Jonathan Harker and attempt to rescue Mina Murray from Count Dracula.	
Bloodnet	1993	Amiga, DOS	Science fiction adventure and role-playing game set in Manhattan during the year 2094. Vampire hunter Abraham Van Helsing is now the leader of a plague of 'cyberpunk vampires', the game's playable character Ransom Stark must stop Van Helsing from taking over the city.	
Castlevania Chronicles	1993	X68000, PlayStation	A Castlevania game compilation first released for the X68000 home computer, then ported several years later for PlayStation.	
Castlevania: Rondo of Blood	1993	TurboGrafx-16, PlayStation Portable	Platform-adventure game from the Castlevania series, was remade in 1995 for the Super Nintendo as Castlevania: Dracula X.	
Dracula Unleashed	1993	DOS, Mega-CD	Interactive movie. Alexander Morris, brother of Quincey Morris, travels to London to discover what happened to Quincey and his companions when they defeated Dracula.	
The Twisted Tales of Spike McFang	1993	SNES	Adventure game with role-playing elements. Players control the titular vampire and attack enemies by throwing Spike's hat or spinning his cape.	
Veil of Darkness	1993	DOS	Action adventure game, a man must face the vampire lord Kairn and his minions after a plane crash in a Romanian valley.	
Master of Darkness	1992	Game Gear, Master System	Platform game. Dr. Social must travel through London in order to face Dracula at the Thames river. Likened to Castlevania games.	
Night Trap	1992	3DO, DOS, Mac OS, Mega-CD, Sega 32X	Interactive movie, the player must protect six young women from vampire-like creatures by switching between surveillance cameras and activating booby traps.	
Super Castlevania IV	1991	SNES	Side-scrolling platform game of the Castlevania franchise, notable for its use of color and sound in the then recent Super Nintendo system. As earlier Castlevania titles, it features the protagonist Simon Belmont, who starts every level with five lives and a time limit, with any of them depleted resulting in a Game over.	
The Last Vampire	1990	ZX Spectrum	Top down action‑adventure game released for the ZX Spectrum, in which players control a warrior tasked with hunting Count Dracula. The game involves exploring and collecting key items such as a stake and silver hammer, and fighting enemies like bats and pirates, while gathering coins to purchase tools needed to progress.	
Castlevania III: Dracula's Curse	1989-12-22 (JP)	NES	Platform game developed by Konami and the third title in the Castlevania main series. It removed the action-adventure and role-playing elements established in the second game in favour of an experience more similar to the first.	
Castlevania: The Adventure	1989-10-22 (JP)	Game Boy, Game Boy Color	First Castlevania game to be released on a handheld, preserving the traditional gameplay conventions of the series. Its remake Castlevania: The Adventure ReBirth was released for the Wii home console in 2009.	
Personal Nightmare	1989	DOS, Amiga, Atari ST	Horror game developed by Horror Soft, later released digitally in 2009 via GOG.com. A haunting has occurred in the protagonist's town, resulting in the possessions of several citizens, who must be eliminated during the course of four days, with the last objective being the defeat of the Devil. Said citizens are controlled by a witch and a vampire, who must be defeated in order to defeat the Devil.	
Fright Night	1988-12	Amiga	Video game adaptation of 1985's titular supernatural horror film, released exclusively for the Amiga platform.	
Dance of the Vampires	1988	Commodore 64	Adventure game split into three chapters. The screen consist of the picture of the location that players are presently at, a description of that location, and a prompt where commands are entered. Recognizable commands include EXAMINE, TAKE, DRINK, ASK ABOUT, and directions can be abbreviated (i.e.: N, S, E, W, U, D).	
Dracula in London	1988	DOS	A classic, text-based adventure based on Bram Stoker's Dracula.	
Night Hunter	1988	DOS, Amiga, Amstrad CPC, Atari ST, ZX Spectrum	A side-scrolling action game by Ubisoft, in which the player controls a vampire that can transform into bat and werewolf.	
Vampire's Empire	1988	Amiga, Atari ST, Commodore 64, MSX, ZX Spectrum	Action game puts the player in the perspective of Doctor Van Helsing, making another attempt to rid the world of Dracula. The world consists of 160 side-view screens, with others accessed via push-scrolling, but must be freed of vampires within a time limit. Van Helsing can defeat enemies using mirrors to reflect his beam of light onto them. Bats and snakes must be avoided, as they cost Van Helsing energy, as well as coffins.	
The Astonishing Adventures of Mr. Weems and the She Vampires	1987	Amstrad CPC, Commodore 64, ZX Spectrum	The titular character has entered the mansion of the Great She Vampire and must defeat her before he is drained of blood. Likened to Gauntlet.	
Haunted Castle	1987-10-26	Arcade, Windows, PlayStation 2, PlayStation 4, Xbox One, Switch	Second arcade game in the Castlevania franchise, originally published by Konami before its conversion to modern platforms decades later. The protagonist in this game is Simon Belmont, who embarks on a journey to save his wife Selena from the series recurrent antagonist, Dracula.	
Castlevania II: Simon's Quest	1987-08-28 (JP)	NES, Windows	Second game in the Castlevania series and remarkably different from its predecessor, combining side-scrolling action and platforming with strong role-playing elements. The game does not feature the traditional stages but allows the player to freely roam the land of Transylvania in the style of Nintendo's Metroid. The game world is divided into outdoor areas, dungeon-like mansions containing crucial quest items, and towns, where Simon can talk to non-player characters, rest, and buy items in shops.	
Vampire Killer	1986-10-30 (JP)	MSX2	Unrelated to the 1984 game Vampire Killer, the latter is a platform-adventure title developed by Konami and an alternative version of the Castlevania game that was released the same year.	
Castlevania	1986-09-26 (JP)	NES, DOS, Amiga, Commodore 64, Game Boy Advance, Windows	Highly praised video game that uses platform gameplay and is divided into six blocks of three stages each, for a total of 18 stages. Simon can move, jump, crouch, climb stairs and use a magic whip (known in series lore as "Vampire Killer") as his primary combat weapon.	
Ghost House	1986-04-21 (JP)	Master System	Platform game, a young boy enters the ghost house in order to defeat vampires after releasing them from their coffins.	
Dracula	1986	Amstrad CPC, Commodore 64, ZX Spectrum,	Text adventure based on the novel written by Bram Stoker.	
Nosferatu the Vampyre	1986	Design Design	Action adventure game ilicensed around the film with the same name. It uses an isometric perspective and is depicted in monochrome. The game is divided into three stages, in which the characters Jonathan Harker, Lucy, and Van Helsing can be controlled, respectively. It features full object interaction as well as basic object physics.	
Vampire	1986	Commodore 64, ZX Spectrum, MSX, Amstrad	An action game composed of 95 different levels and segmented in two acts, where the protagonist must fight against hordes of Count Dracula's slaves, gather keys, and obtain the essential items that allow to defeat him.	
The Crimson Crown	1985-10	DOS, Amiga, Apple II, Commodore 64, Mac	Text adventure game that tasks the player with a quest to defeat a magical vampire with the assistance of Princess Sabrina (who is now a fledgling magician) and the heir to the throne, Prince Erik.	
Realm of the Undead	1984	ZX Spectrum	Action game that takes place in three stages, all found in Dark Lord's castle, titular antagonist.	
Vampire Killer	1984	ZX Spectrum	Action adventure game, where the player controls a vampire hunter who has been tasked to remove Dracula from the 12th floor of a block of flats by a client on the floor below.	
Vampire's Castle Adventure	1984	DOS	This short text adventure (written in a mere 181 lines of BASIC code) has the player exploring a vampire's lair in search of the game's "concealed goal".	
Vampire Village	1983	ZX Spectrum	Single screen game in which volunteers must be outfitted with equipment and sent to destroy a vampire who has taken up residence in a castle near a small village.	
The Tomb of Dracula	1982	ZX Spectrum, ZX81	Adventure game where the player explore vaults over various levels of Dracula's Tomb to find the Vampire's Treasure. At the start of the game the player is shown a map of the first level of 300 vaults showing all the obstacles, monsters and stakes to memorise before it disappears. The player moves about in North, South, East or West directions in a perspective that is presented in first person.	
Transylvania	1982	Apple II, Commodore 64, Atari 8-bit, Mac, PC-88/PC-98	Adventure game where the player is on a quest to rescue Princess Sabrina from a countryside roamed by a werewolf, a vampire, a prankster goblin, a witch, and an alien spaceship, while bound to a time limit.	
Transylvanian Tower	1982	Commodore 64, Dragon 32/64, ZX Spectrum	Single player maze game in which the player must explore five levels of Count Kreepie's castle, kill him, and find his stash of loot. The castle has over five hundred different rooms to explore.	
The Count	1979-07	Apple II, Atari 8-bit, PET, TI-99/4A, TRS-80, VIC-20, ZX Spectrum	Text adventure, the player has been sent to defeat Count Dracula by the local villagers. An enhanced version was released under the name "Scott Adams' Graphic Adventure #5: The Count".	
Dracula Hunter	1979	Arcade	Japanese arcade video game partly lost to video game history. A very limited number of arcade cabinets were produced by its now defunct company Technon. In the game, the player controls an exorcist holding a cross with the intent to slay vampires roaming the courtyard of a haunted mansion, all the while protecting a sleeping princess at the bottom center of the screen as well as villagers who roam throughout the courtyard.	
