= List of Castlevania media =

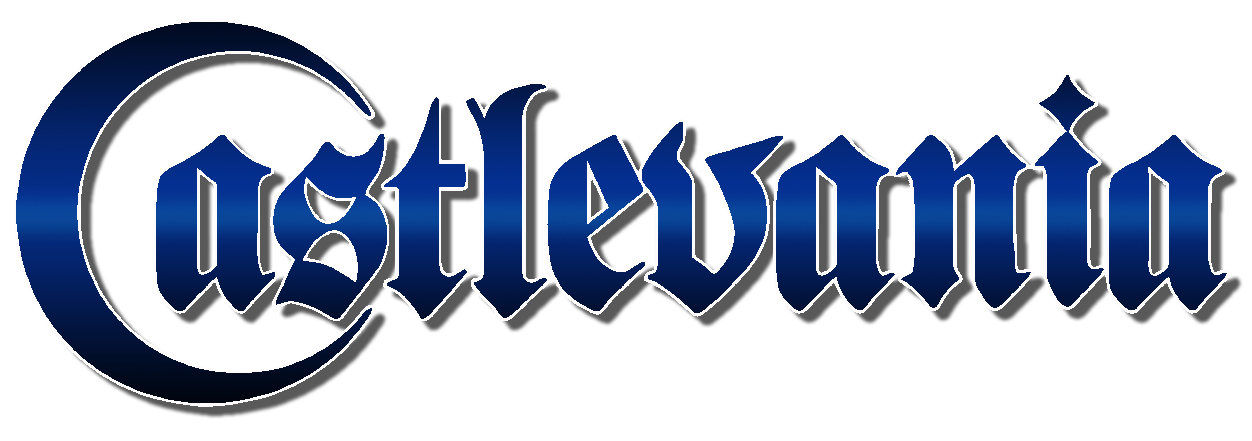
Logo of the Castlevania series

Castlevania is a video game series created and published by Konami. The series debuted in Japan on September 26, 1986, with Akumajō Dracula (悪魔城ドラキュラ, Akumajō Dorakyura; lit. "Demon Castle Dracula"), which was later released as Castlevania in the United States (May 1, 1987) and PAL (December 19, 1988). Titles in the series have been released on numerous video game consoles, handheld game consoles, and personal computer platforms, and several have been re-released on multiple platforms and included as part of compilation packages.

The series' characters have appeared in several other Konami games. There have been also numerous separately released music albums, initially by King Records.

== Video games ==
=== Original series ===
Game	Details
Castlevania Original release date(s): JP: September 26, 1986; NA: May 1, 1987; EU: December 19, 1988	Release years by system: 1986 – Famicom Disk System; 1987 – Nintendo Entertainment System, Nintendo VS. System, PlayChoice-10; 1990 – PC, Commodore 64, Amiga; 1993 – Famicom; 2002 – Windows; 2004 – Mobile phone, Game Boy Advance
Castlevania Original release date(s): JP: September 26, 1986; NA: May 1, 1987; EU: December 19, 1988	Notes: Known in Japan as Akumajō Dracula (悪魔城ドラキュラ, Akumajō Dorakyura; lit. "Demon Castle Dracula").
Vampire Killer Original release date(s): JP: October 30, 1986; EU: 1987; BRA: 1987	Release years by system: 1986 – MSX2
Vampire Killer Original release date(s): JP: October 30, 1986; EU: 1987; BRA: 1987	Notes: Known in Japan as Akumajō Dracula (悪魔城ドラキュラ, Akumajō Dorakyura; lit. "Demon Castle Dracula").
Castlevania II: Simon's Quest Original release date(s): JP: August 28, 1987; NA: December 1, 1988; EU: April 27, 1990	Release years by system: 1987 – Famicom Disk System; 1988 – Nintendo Entertainment System, 2002 – Windows
Castlevania II: Simon's Quest Original release date(s): JP: August 28, 1987; NA: December 1, 1988; EU: April 27, 1990	Notes: Known in Japan as Dracula II Noroi no Fūin (ドラキュラII 呪いの封印, Dorakyura 2 Noroi no Fūin; lit. "Dracula II: The Seal of the Curse").
Haunted Castle Original release date(s): JP: February 1988; NA: September 22, 1988; EU: November 1988	Release years by system: 1988 – Arcade; 2006 – PlayStation 2 (Japan only); 2017 – PlayStation 4 (part of the Arcade Archives series); 2021 – Nintendo Switch (part of the Arcade Archives series)
Haunted Castle Original release date(s): JP: February 1988; NA: September 22, 1988; EU: November 1988	Notes: Known in Japan as Akumajō Dracula (悪魔城ドラキュラ, Akumajō Dorakyura; lit. "Demon Castle Dracula").
Castlevania: The Adventure Original release date(s): JP: October 27, 1989; NA: December 15, 1989; EU: August 8, 1991	Release years by system: 1989 – Game Boy; 2000 – Game Boy Color (part of Konami GB Collection Vol.1)
Castlevania: The Adventure Original release date(s): JP: October 27, 1989; NA: December 15, 1989; EU: August 8, 1991	Notes: Known in Japan as Dracula Densetsu (ドラキュラ伝説, Dorakyura Densetsu; lit. "Dracula Legend").; First handheld Castlevania title.; First Konami title for the Game Boy.
Castlevania III: Dracula's Curse Original release date(s): JP: December 22, 1989; NA: September 1, 1990; EU: December 19, 1992	Release years by system: 1989 – Famicom; 1990 – Nintendo Entertainment System; 2002 – Windows; 2006 – Mobile phone
Castlevania III: Dracula's Curse Original release date(s): JP: December 22, 1989; NA: September 1, 1990; EU: December 19, 1992	Notes: Known in Japan as Akumajō Densetsu (悪魔城伝説, Akumajō Densetsu; lit. "Demon Castle Legend").
Castlevania II: Belmont's Revenge Original release date(s): JP: July 12, 1991; NA: August 1991; EU: November 26, 1992	Release years by system: 1991 – Game Boy; 2000 – Game Boy Color (part of Konami GB Collection Vol.3)
Castlevania II: Belmont's Revenge Original release date(s): JP: July 12, 1991; NA: August 1991; EU: November 26, 1992	Notes: Known in Japan as Dracula Densetsu II (ドラキュラ伝説II, Dorakyura Densetsu 2; lit. "Dracula Legend II").
Super Castlevania IV Original release date(s): JP: October 31, 1991; NA: December 4, 1991; EU: November 23, 1992	Release years by system: 1991 – Super Nintendo Entertainment System
Super Castlevania IV Original release date(s): JP: October 31, 1991; NA: December 4, 1991; EU: November 23, 1992	Notes: Known in Japan as Akumajō Dracula (悪魔城ドラキュラ, Akumajō Dorakyura; lit. "Demon Castle Dracula").
Castlevania Chronicles Original release date(s): JP: July 23, 1993; NA: October 8, 2001; (PlayStation): EU: November 9, 2001; (PlayStation)	Release years by system: 1993 – X68000; 2001 – PlayStation (Castlevania Chronicles); 2008 – PlayStation Network (Castlevania Chronicles)
Castlevania Chronicles Original release date(s): JP: July 23, 1993; NA: October 8, 2001; (PlayStation): EU: November 9, 2001; (PlayStation)	Notes: Akumajou Dracula for the Sharp X68000 was re-released on the PlayStation as Castlevania Chronicles with new features.
Castlevania: Rondo of Blood Original release date(s): JP: October 29, 1993; NA: October 23, 2007; (PlayStation Portable): EU: February 18, 2008; (PlayStation Portable)	Release years by system: 1993 – PC Engine Super CD-ROM^{2} 2007 – PlayStation Portable (Castlevania: The Dracula X Chronicles)
Castlevania: Rondo of Blood Original release date(s): JP: October 29, 1993; NA: October 23, 2007; (PlayStation Portable): EU: February 18, 2008; (PlayStation Portable)	Notes: Known in Japan as Akumajō Dracula X: Chi no Rondo (悪魔城ドラキュラX 血の輪廻(ロンド), Akumajō Dorakyura X: Chi no Rondo; lit. "Demon Castle Dracula X: Reincarnation of Blood"); Re-released on the PlayStation Portable as Castlevania: The Dracula X Chronicles.
Castlevania: Bloodlines Original release date(s): NA: March 17, 1994; JP: March 18, 1994; EU: March 20, 1994	Release years by system: 1994 – Sega Genesis
Castlevania: Bloodlines Original release date(s): NA: March 17, 1994; JP: March 18, 1994; EU: March 20, 1994	Notes: Known in Japan as Vampire Killer (バンパイアキラー, Banpaia Kirā); Known in Europe as Castlevania: The New Generation.
Castlevania: Dracula X Original release date(s): JP: July 21, 1995; NA: September 1995; EU: February 22, 1996	Release years by system: 1995 – Super Nintendo Entertainment System
Castlevania: Dracula X Original release date(s): JP: July 21, 1995; NA: September 1995; EU: February 22, 1996	Notes: Known as Castlevania: Vampire's Kiss in Europe and Akumajō Dracula XX (悪魔城ドラキュラXX, Akumajō Dorakyura XX; lit. "Demon Castle Dracula XX") in Japan.
Castlevania: Symphony of the Night Original release date(s): JP: March 20, 1997; NA: October 2, 1997; EU: November 1, 1997	Release years by system: 1997 – PlayStation; 1998 – Saturn; 2007 – Xbox Live Arcade, PlayStation Network, PlayStation Portable (Castlevania: The Dracula X Chronicles); 2020 – Android, iOS
Castlevania: Symphony of the Night Original release date(s): JP: March 20, 1997; NA: October 2, 1997; EU: November 1, 1997	Notes: Known in Japan as Akumajō Dracula X Gekka no Yasōkyoku (悪魔城ドラキュラX 月下の夜想曲, Akumajō Dorakyura X Gekka no Yasōkyoku; lit. "Demon Castle Dracula X: Nocturne in the Moonlight").; Included in Castlevania: The Dracula X Chronicles.
Castlevania Legends Original release date(s): JP: November 27, 1997; NA: March 11, 1998; EU: 1998	Release years by system: 1997 – Game Boy, Super Game Boy
Castlevania Legends Original release date(s): JP: November 27, 1997; NA: March 11, 1998; EU: 1998	Notes: Known in Japan as Akumajō Dracula Dark Night Prelude (悪魔城ドラキュラ 漆黒たる前奏曲, Akumajō Dorakyura Dāku Naito Pureryūdo; lit. "Demon Castle Dracula: Dark Night Prelude").
Castlevania Original release date(s): NA: January 26, 1999; JP: March 11, 1999; EU: May 14, 1999	Release years by system: 1999 – Nintendo 64
Castlevania Original release date(s): NA: January 26, 1999; JP: March 11, 1999; EU: May 14, 1999	Notes: Unofficially referred to as Castlevania 64 by the media.; Known in Japan as Akumajō Dracula Mokushiroku (悪魔城ラキュラ黙示録, Akumajō Dorakyura Mokushiroku; lit. "Demon Castle Dracula Apocalypse").
Castlevania: Legacy of Darkness Original release date(s): NA: November 30, 1999; JP: December 25, 1999; EU: March 3, 2000	Release years by system: 1999 – Nintendo 64
Castlevania: Legacy of Darkness Original release date(s): NA: November 30, 1999; JP: December 25, 1999; EU: March 3, 2000	Notes: Known in Japan as Akumajō Dracula Mokushiroku Gaiden Legend of Cornell (悪魔城ドラキュラ黙示録外伝 LEGEND OF CORNELL, Akumajō Dorakyura Mokushiroku Gaiden LEGEND OF CORNELL; lit. "Demon Castle Dracula Apocalypse Supplemental Story: Legend of Cornell").
Castlevania: Circle of the Moon Original release date(s): JP: March 21, 2001; NA: June 11, 2001; EU: June 22, 2001	Release years by system: 2001 – Game Boy Advance
Castlevania: Circle of the Moon Original release date(s): JP: March 21, 2001; NA: June 11, 2001; EU: June 22, 2001	Notes: Known in Europe as Castlevania.; Known in Japan as Akumajō Dracula Circle of the Moon (悪魔城ドラキュラ Circle of the Moon, Akumajō Dorakyura Circle of the Moon; lit. "Demon Castle Dracula Circle of the Moon").
Castlevania: Harmony of Dissonance Original release date(s): JP: June 6, 2002; NA: September 16, 2002; EU: October 11, 2002	Release years by system: 2002 – Game Boy Advance
Castlevania: Harmony of Dissonance Original release date(s): JP: June 6, 2002; NA: September 16, 2002; EU: October 11, 2002	Notes: Known in Japan as Castlevania Byakuya no Concerto (Castlevania 白夜の協奏曲, Castlevania Byakuya no Koncheruto; lit. "Castlevania: White Night Concerto" or "Castlevania: Concerto of Midnight Sun").; Included in the Castlevania: Double Pack for the Game Boy Advance.
Castlevania: Aria of Sorrow Original release date(s): NA: May 6, 2003; JP: May 8, 2003; EU: May 9, 2003	Release years by system: 2003 – Game Boy Advance
Castlevania: Aria of Sorrow Original release date(s): NA: May 6, 2003; JP: May 8, 2003; EU: May 9, 2003	Notes: Known in Japan as Castlevania Akatsuki no Menuett (キャッスルヴァニア 暁月の円舞曲, Kyassuruvania Akatsuki no Menuetto; lit. "Castlevania: Minuet of Dawn").; Included in Castlevania: Double Pack for the Game Boy Advance.
Castlevania: Lament of Innocence Original release date(s): NA: October 21, 2003; JP: November 27, 2003; EU: February 13, 2004	Release years by system: 2003 – PlayStation 2; 2012 – PlayStation Network
Castlevania: Lament of Innocence Original release date(s): NA: October 21, 2003; JP: November 27, 2003; EU: February 13, 2004	Notes: Known in Japan and Europe as Castlevania (キャッスルヴァニア, Kyassuruvania).
Castlevania: Dawn of Sorrow Original release date(s): JP: August 25, 2005; EU: September 30, 2005; NA: October 4, 2005	Release years by system: 2005 – Nintendo DS
Castlevania: Dawn of Sorrow Original release date(s): JP: August 25, 2005; EU: September 30, 2005; NA: October 4, 2005	Notes: Known in Japan as Akumajō Dracula Sōgetsu no Jūjika (悪魔城ドラキュラ 蒼月の十字架, Akumajō Dorakyura Sōgetsu no Jūjika; lit. "Demon Castle Dracula: Cross of the Blue Moon").; First Castlevania game with a multiplayer mode.
Castlevania: Curse of Darkness Original release date(s): NA: November 1, 2005; JP: November 24, 2005; EU: February 17, 2006	Release years by system: 2005 – PlayStation 2, Xbox
Castlevania: Curse of Darkness Original release date(s): NA: November 1, 2005; JP: November 24, 2005; EU: February 17, 2006	Notes: Known in Japan as Akumajō Dracula Yami no Juin (悪魔城ドラキュラ 闇の呪印, Akumajō Dorakyura Yami no Juin; lit. "Demon Castle Dracula: Curse of Darkness").
Castlevania: Portrait of Ruin Original release date(s): JP: November 16, 2006; NA: December 5, 2006; EU: March 9, 2007; AUS: March 22, 2007	Release years by system: 2006 – Nintendo DS
Castlevania: Portrait of Ruin Original release date(s): JP: November 16, 2006; NA: December 5, 2006; EU: March 9, 2007; AUS: March 22, 2007	Notes: Known in Japan as Akumajō Dracula Gallery of Labyrinth (悪魔城ドラキュラ ギャラリー・オブ・ラビリンス, Akumajō Dorakyura Gyararī obu Rabirinsu; lit. "Demon Castle Dracula: Gallery of Labyrinth"); First Castlevania game with online cooperative multiplayer.; Popular game outlets included a 20th Anniversary Pre-Order Bundle with the game.
Castlevania: Order of Ecclesia Original release date(s): NA: October 21, 2008; JP: October 23, 2008; EU: February 6, 2009	Release years by system: 2008 – Nintendo DS
Castlevania: Order of Ecclesia Original release date(s): NA: October 21, 2008; JP: October 23, 2008; EU: February 6, 2009	Notes: Known in Japan as Akumajō Dracula Ubawareta Kokuin (悪魔城ドラキュラ 奪われた刻印, Akumajō Dorakyura Ubawareta Kokuin; lit. "Demon Castle Dracula: The Stolen Seal").
Castlevania: The Adventure ReBirth Original release date(s): JP: October 27, 2009; NA: December 28, 2009; EUR: February 26, 2010	Release years by system: 2009 – WiiWare
Castlevania: The Adventure ReBirth Original release date(s): JP: October 27, 2009; NA: December 28, 2009; EUR: February 26, 2010	Notes: Known in Japan as Dracula Densetsu ReBirth (ドラキュラ伝説 ReBirth, Dorakyura Densetsu ReBirth; lit. "The Legend of Dracula ReBirth"); Loose remake of the Game Boy entry.; Developed by M2, who previously made Gradius ReBirth and Contra ReBirth.
Castlevania: Belmont's Curse Original release date(s): WW: October 15, 2026	Release years by system: 2026 - PlayStation 5, Nintendo Switch, Xbox Series X/S, Windows
Castlevania: Belmont's Curse Original release date(s): WW: October 15, 2026	Notes: First mainline Castlevania game since 2014

=== Lords of Shadow series ===
Game	Details
Castlevania: Lords of Shadow Original release date(s): NA: October 5, 2010; EU: October 8, 2010; JP: December 16, 2010	Release years by system: 2010 – Xbox 360, PlayStation 3; 2013 – Microsoft Windows
Castlevania: Lords of Shadow Original release date(s): NA: October 5, 2010; EU: October 8, 2010; JP: December 16, 2010	Notes: Released on the Xbox 360 and PlayStation 3.; A reboot of the series. The game was originally titled Lords of Shadow with no connection to the Castlevania franchise mentioned. According to Konami this was to keep secret of their plans to "radically change the direction of the Castlevania myth".; Developed by MercurySteam and Kojima Productions.; Known in Japan as Akumajō Dracula: Lords of Shadow (悪魔城ドラキュラ ロード オブ シャドウ, Akumajō Dorakyura Rōdo obu Shadō; lit. "Demon Castle Dracula: Lords of Shadow").
Castlevania: Lords of Shadow – Mirror of Fate Original release date(s): NA: March 5, 2013; EU: March 8, 2013; JP: March 20, 2013	Release years by system: 2013 – Nintendo 3DS, Xbox 360, PlayStation 3; 2014 – Microsoft Windows
Castlevania: Lords of Shadow – Mirror of Fate Original release date(s): NA: March 5, 2013; EU: March 8, 2013; JP: March 20, 2013	Notes: Takes place 25 years after the events of the first game.; Title for the Xbox 360, PlayStation 3 and Microsoft Windows versions updated to Castlevania: Lords of Shadow – Mirror of Fate HD.; Known in Japan as Castlevania: Lords of Shadow Sadame no Makyō (キャッスルヴァニア ロード オブ シャドウ 宿命の魔鏡, Rōdo obu Shadō Sadame no Makyō; lit. "Castlevania: Lords of Shadow - Magic Mirror of Destiny").
Castlevania: Lords of Shadow 2 Original release date(s): NA: February 25, 2014; EU: February 28, 2014; JP: September 4, 2014	Release years by system: 2014 – Microsoft Windows, Xbox 360, PlayStation 3
Castlevania: Lords of Shadow 2 Original release date(s): NA: February 25, 2014; EU: February 28, 2014; JP: September 4, 2014	Notes: Direct sequel to Lords of Shadow.; Known in Japan as Akumajō Dracula: Lords of Shadow 2 (悪魔城ドラキュラ ロード オブ シャドウ 2, Akumajō Dorakyura Rōdo obu Shadō 2; lit. "Demon Castle Dracula: Lords of Shadow 2").

=== Spin-offs ===
Game	Details
Kid Dracula (1990 video game) Original release date(s): JP: October 19, 1990; NA: May 16, 2019; EU: May 16, 2019	Release years by system: 1990 – Family Computer; 2006 – Mobile phone 2019 – PlayStation 4, Xbox One, Nintendo Switch, Microsoft Windows (part of Castlevania Anniversary Collection)
Kid Dracula (1990 video game) Original release date(s): JP: October 19, 1990; NA: May 16, 2019; EU: May 16, 2019	Notes: Known in Japan as Akumajō Supesharu: Boku Dorakyura-kun (悪魔城すぺしゃる ぼくドラキュラくん; lit. "Demon Castle Special: Kid Dracula"); First international release as part of the Castlevania Anniversary Collection compilation.
Kid Dracula (1993 video game) Original release date(s): JP: January 3, 1993; NA: March 1993; EU: 1993	Release years by system: 1993 – Game Boy
Kid Dracula (1993 video game) Original release date(s): JP: January 3, 1993; NA: March 1993; EU: 1993	Notes: Known in Japan as Akumajō Supesharu: Boku Dorakyura-kun (悪魔城すぺしゃる ぼくドラキュラくん; lit. "Demon Castle Special: Kid Dracula"); Sequel to the Family Computer game Akumajō Special: Boku Dracula-kun.
Castlevania: Order of Shadows Original release date(s): NA: September 18, 2007	Release years by system: 2007 – Mobile phone
Castlevania: Order of Shadows Original release date(s): NA: September 18, 2007	Notes: Developed and published by Konami Mobile.
Castlevania Judgment Original release date(s): NA: November 18, 2008; EU: March 20, 2009; JP: January 15, 2009	Release years by system: 2008 – Wii
Castlevania Judgment Original release date(s): NA: November 18, 2008; EU: March 20, 2009; JP: January 15, 2009	Notes: Known in Japan as Akumajō Dorakyura Jajjimento (悪魔城ドラキュラ ジャッジメント; lit. "Demon Castle Dracula Judgment"); First fighting game in the series.
Akumajō Dracula The Medal Original release date(s): JP: September 18, 2008	Release years by system: 2008 – Medal game
Akumajō Dracula The Medal Original release date(s): JP: September 18, 2008	Notes: Medal game based on the series.
Pachislot Akumajō Dracula Original release date(s): JP: January 5, 2009; EU: 2009	Release years by system: 2009 – Slot machine
Pachislot Akumajō Dracula Original release date(s): JP: January 5, 2009; EU: 2009	Notes: First slot machine based on the series.
Castlevania: The Arcade Original release date(s): JP: October 2, 2009	Release years by system: 2009 – Arcade
Castlevania: The Arcade Original release date(s): JP: October 2, 2009	Notes: The second arcade title.; First game in the series since Circle of the Moon not to be produced by Koji Igarashi, but instead by Masayuki Ohashi.
Pachislot Akumajō Dracula II Original release date(s): JP: July 20, 2010	Release years by system: 2010 – Slot machine
Pachislot Akumajō Dracula II Original release date(s): JP: July 20, 2010	Notes: Sequel to Pachislot Akumajō Dracula.
Castlevania Puzzle: Encore of the Night Original release date(s): July 16, 2010	Release years by system: 2010 – iOS; 2011 – Windows Phone
Castlevania Puzzle: Encore of the Night Original release date(s): July 16, 2010	Notes: A puzzle game for the iPhone based on Symphony of the Night.; Released for Windows Phone on January 18, 2011.
Castlevania: Harmony of Despair Original release date(s): August 4, 2010	Release years by system: 2010 – Xbox Live Arcade; 2011 – PlayStation Network
Castlevania: Harmony of Despair Original release date(s): August 4, 2010	Notes: Multiplayer title for Xbox Live Arcade.
Pachislot Akumajō Dracula III Original release date(s): JP: February 6, 2012	Release years by system: 2012 – Slot machine
Pachislot Akumajō Dracula III Original release date(s): JP: February 6, 2012	Notes: A prequel to Pachislot Akumajō Dracula.
CR Pachinko Akumajo Dracula Original release date(s): JP: October 19, 2015	Release years by system: 2015 – Slot machine
Pachislot Akumajō Dracula: Lords of Shadow Original release date(s): JP: April 6, 2017	Release years by system: 2017 – Slot machine
Castlevania: Grimoire of Souls Original release date(s): CAN: September 18, 2019; WW: September 17, 2021	Release years by system: 2019 – Android, iOS
Castlevania: Grimoire of Souls Original release date(s): CAN: September 18, 2019; WW: September 17, 2021	Notes: Originally released as a free-to-play game before being shut down and delisted in September 2020.; Rereleased via Apple Arcade in September 2021 without the monetization elements.

=== Compilations and collections ===
Game	Details
Konami Collector's Series: Castlevania & Contra Original release date(s): NA: November 16, 2002	Release years by system: 2002 – Microsoft Windows
Konami Collector's Series: Castlevania & Contra Original release date(s): NA: November 16, 2002	Notes: The compilation includes the NES versions of Castlevania, Castlevania II: Simon's Quest, and Castlevania III: Dracula's Curse along with Contra and Super C; Jackal is also on the CD.; It was released digitally on GOG.com in September 2020.
Castlevania: Double Pack Original release date(s): NA: January 11, 2006; EU: February 17, 2006	Release years by system: 2006 – Game Boy Advance
Castlevania: Double Pack Original release date(s): NA: January 11, 2006; EU: February 17, 2006	Notes: A single Game Boy Advance cartridge that includes Castlevania: Harmony of Dissonance and Castlevania: Aria of Sorrow.
Castlevania: The Dracula X Chronicles Original release date(s): JP: November 8, 2007; NA: October 23, 2007; EUR: February 15, 2008	Release years by system: 2007 – PlayStation Portable
Castlevania: The Dracula X Chronicles Original release date(s): JP: November 8, 2007; NA: October 23, 2007; EUR: February 15, 2008	Notes: A 2.5D remake of Castlevania: Rondo of Blood.; Also includes the original Rondo of Blood as well as Castlevania: Symphony of the Night, which has new features.
Castlevania Requiem Original release date(s): WW: October 26, 2018	Release years by system: 2018 – PlayStation 4
Castlevania Requiem Original release date(s): WW: October 26, 2018	Notes: A collection of Rondo of Blood and Symphony of the Night, based on the emulated ports previously featured in The Dracula X Chronicles.
Castlevania Anniversary Collection Original release date(s): WW: May 16, 2019	Release years by system: 2019 – Microsoft Windows, PlayStation 4, Xbox One and Nintendo Switch
Castlevania Anniversary Collection Original release date(s): WW: May 16, 2019	Notes: The compilation includes the NES versions of Castlevania, Castlevania II: Simon's Quest, Castlevania III: Dracula's Curse, and Kid Dracula along with Castlevania: The Adventure (Game Boy), Castlevania II: Belmont's Revenge (Game Boy), Castlevania: Bloodlines (Genesis) and Super Castlevania IV (SNES).; Developed by M2.; The Japanese versions of all of the games except Castlevania II: Simon's Quest were added in a free update shortly after the collection's release.; Includes a digital booklet with some design documents for all of the games.
Castlevania Advance Collection Original release date(s): WW: September 23, 2021	Release years by system: 2021 – Microsoft Windows, PlayStation 4, Xbox One and Nintendo Switch
Castlevania Advance Collection Original release date(s): WW: September 23, 2021	Notes: A compilation of three Game Boy Advance titles, including Castlevania: Circle of the Moon, Castlevania: Harmony of Dissonance, and Castlevania: Aria of Sorrow, as well as the Super NES title Castlevania: Dracula X.; Developed by M2.; Includes a music player and a gallery of concept artwork and scans of the original game packaging.
Castlevania Dominus Collection Original release date(s): WW: August 27, 2024	Release years by system: 2024 – PlayStation 5, Xbox Series X/S, Microsoft Windows and Nintendo Switch
Castlevania Dominus Collection Original release date(s): WW: August 27, 2024	Notes: A compilation of three Nintendo DS titles, including Castlevania: Dawn of Sorrow, Castlevania: Portrait of Ruin and Castlevania: Order of Ecclesia, plus the arcade game Haunted Castle and a remake of it titled Haunted Castle Revisited.; Developed by M2.

=== Cancelled titles ===
Game	Details
Castlevania 32X Cancellation date: Unknown	Proposed system release: 1996 – Sega 32X
Castlevania 32X Cancellation date: Unknown	Notes: Also sometimes referred to as "Castlevania: The Bloodletting" by fans, though Konami did file a trademark using this name.; Koji Igarashi stated initial ideas were changed and used for Symphony of the Night.
Castlevania: Resurrection Cancellation date: March 30, 2000	Proposed system release: 2000 – Dreamcast
Castlevania: Resurrection Cancellation date: March 30, 2000	Notes: Would have been the first Castlevania title developed by Konami's American division.; The prototype demo was released online.
Akumajō Dracula (TGS 2008 project) Cancellation date: Unknown	Proposed system release: Xbox 360, PlayStation 3
Akumajō Dracula (TGS 2008 project) Cancellation date: Unknown	Notes: Planned title on the Xbox 360 and PlayStation 3. It was briefly presented as a teaser trailer in TGS 2008 before being cancelled.; First attempt to reboot the franchise prior to Lords of Shadow.
Castlevania: Symphony of the Night Cancellation date: Unknown	Proposed system release: Game.com
Castlevania: Symphony of the Night Cancellation date: Unknown	Notes: An in-progress prototype was discovered and released onto the internet in 2022.

=== Related titles ===
There are games created by Konami or other developers that have Castlevania elements or characters.

Game	Details
Konami Wai Wai World Original release date(s): JP: January 14, 1988	Release years by system: 1988 – Nintendo Entertainment System; 2006 – Mobile phone
Konami Wai Wai World Original release date(s): JP: January 14, 1988	Notes: Released only in Japan.; Features a descendant of Simon Belmont (named "Simon Belmont III") as a playable character.
Wai Wai World 2: SOS!! Parsley Jō Original release date(s): JP: January 5, 1991	Release years by system: 1991 – Nintendo Entertainment System; 2015 – Virtual Console
Wai Wai World 2: SOS!! Parsley Jō Original release date(s): JP: January 5, 1991	Notes: Sequel to Konami Wai Wai World.; Released only in Japan.; Featured Simon Belmont as a playable character.
Wai Wai Bingo Original release date(s): JP: 1993	Release years by system: 1993 – Medal Game
Wai Wai Bingo Original release date(s): JP: 1993	Notes: Released only in Japan.
Piccadilly Circus: Konami Wai Wai World Original release date(s): JP: 1994	Release years by system: 1994 - Medal Game
Piccadilly Circus: Konami Wai Wai World Original release date(s): JP: 1994	Notes: Released only in Japan.
Wai Wai Jockey Original release date(s): JP: 1995	Release years by system: 1995 – Medal Game
Wai Wai Jockey Original release date(s): JP: 1995	Notes: Released only in Japan.
Jikkyō Oshaberi Parodius: Forever With Me Original release date(s): JP: 1996, 2007	Release years by system: 1996 – Sega Saturn, PlayStation; 2007 – PlayStation Portable
Jikkyō Oshaberi Parodius: Forever With Me Original release date(s): JP: 1996, 2007	Notes: Released only in Japan.; Fourth game in the Parodius series, a spin-off of Gradius.; Dracula-kun and Kid Dracula are available as unlockable characters.
Sexy Parodius Original release date(s): JP: 1996/1997	Release years by system: 1996 – Arcade; 1997 – Sega Saturn, PlayStation; 2007 – PlayStation Portable
Sexy Parodius Original release date(s): JP: 1996/1997	Notes: Features a level that parodies Castlevania.
Wai Wai Poker Original release date(s): JP: 1997	Release years by system: 1997 – Medal Game
Wai Wai Poker Original release date(s): JP: 1997	Notes: Released only in Japan.
Konami Characore World Original release date(s): JP: 2000	Release years by system: 2000 – Mobile Phone
Konami Characore World Original release date(s): JP: 2000	Notes: Released only in Japan.
Konami Krazy Racers Original release date(s): JP: March 21, 2001; NA: June 10, 2001; EU: June 15, 2001	Release years by system: 2001 – Game Boy Advance; 2009 – iOS
Konami Krazy Racers Original release date(s): JP: March 21, 2001; NA: June 10, 2001; EU: June 15, 2001	Notes: Released in Japan as Konami Wai Wai Racing Advance.; Featured Dracula as a playable character.
DreamMix TV World Fighters Original release date(s): JP: December 18, 2003	Release years by system: 2003 – GameCube, PlayStation 2
DreamMix TV World Fighters Original release date(s): JP: December 18, 2003	Notes: Released only in Japan.; Featured Simon Belmont as a playable representative of Konami.
Wai Wai Sokoban Original release date(s): JP: 2006	Release years by system: 2006 – Mobile phone
Wai Wai Sokoban Original release date(s): JP: 2006	Notes: Released only in Japan.; Featured Simon Belmont as a playable character.
New International Track & Field Original release date(s): JP: 2008	Release years by system: 2008 – Nintendo DS
New International Track & Field Original release date(s): JP: 2008	Notes: Featured Simon Belmont as a playable character.
Otomedius Excellent Original release date(s): JP: April 21, 2011; NA: November 1, 2011	Release years by system: 2010 – Xbox 360
Otomedius Excellent Original release date(s): JP: April 21, 2011; NA: November 1, 2011	Notes: Gradius spin-off featuring characters loosely based on various Konami series. Featured a character named Kokoro Belmont as a playable pilot.
Super Bomberman R Original release date(s): WW: March 3, 2017	Release years by system: 2017 - Nintendo Switch; 2018 – PlayStation 4, Xbox One, Microsoft Windows
Super Bomberman R Original release date(s): WW: March 3, 2017	Notes: Belmont Bomber, Alucard Bomber and Dracula Bomber were based on Simon Belmont, Alucard and Count Dracula.
Bombergirl Original release date(s): JP: August 30, 2018	Release years by system: 2018 - Arcade
Bombergirl Original release date(s): JP: August 30, 2018	Notes: Bomberman spin-off featuring characters loosely based on various Konami series. Featured a character named Sepia Belmont as a playable character.
Pixel Puzzle Collection Original release date(s): WW: October 9, 2018	Release years by system: 2018 - iOS, Android
Super Smash Bros. Ultimate Original release date(s): WW: December 7, 2018	Release years by system: 2018 - Nintendo Switch
Super Smash Bros. Ultimate Original release date(s): WW: December 7, 2018	Notes: Features Simon Belmont and Richter Belmont as playable characters, alongside a themed Dracula's Castle stage, 34 music tracks from the series, 29 Spirit characters, and Alucard as an Assist Trophy.
Dead Cells: Return to Castlevania Original release date(s): WW: March 6, 2023	Release years by system: 2023 - Various
Dead Cells: Return to Castlevania Original release date(s): WW: March 6, 2023	Notes: Downloadable content for Dead Cells, a roguelike metroidvania game; Features characters, weapons, and enemies from the series and a level inspired by Symphony of the Night; Features Richter Belmont as a playable character.
V Rising Original release date(s): WW: May 8, 2024	Release years by system: 2024 - Windows, PlayStation 5
V Rising Original release date(s): WW: May 8, 2024	Notes: The "Legacy of Castlevania Premium Pack" DLC adds cosmetics and other elements from the Castlevania series.
Astro Bot Original release date(s): WW: September 6, 2024	Release years by system: 2024 - PlayStation 5
Astro Bot Original release date(s): WW: September 6, 2024	Notes: Richter Belmont (as Vampire Killer) and Alucard (as Dandy Dhampir) appears as VIP Bot outfits.
Vampire Survivors: Ode to Castlevania Original release date(s): WW: October 31, 2024	Release years by system: 2024 - macOS, Windows, Xbox One, Xbox Series X/S, Nintendo Switch, Android, iOS, PlayStation 4, PlayStation 5
Vampire Survivors: Ode to Castlevania Original release date(s): WW: October 31, 2024	Notes: Downloadable content for Vampire Survivors, a roguelike shoot-'em-up game; Adds multiple characters, weapons, and music tracks from the series, along with a new Castlevania inspired level.
Wai Wai World Craft Original release date(s): JP: TBA	Release years by system: TBA - iOS, Android, PC
Wai Wai World Craft Original release date(s): JP: TBA	Notes: Simon Belmont, Trevor Belmont, Death and Dracula appears in the free-to-play.
Picross S Konami Antiques Edition Original release date(s): WW: April 30, 2026	Release years by system: 2026 - Nintendo Switch
Picross S Konami Antiques Edition Original release date(s): WW: April 30, 2026	Notes: A crossover installment based on 80 arcade and console games from Konami, including Castlevania.

== Other media ==
Game	Details
Famicom Rocky: JP: 1985; – Manga	Notes: Published by CoroCoro Comic in 1985 to 1987.
Akumajō Dracula — Kojō no Shitō: JP: March 20, 1987; – Gamebook	Notes: Published by Futabasha in 1987.; Features a descendant of Simon Belmont in the 1950s.
Konami Wai Wai World: JP: March 31, 1988; – Gamebook	Notes: Features several characters from the Castlevania series.
Captain N: The Game Master 1989 – TV	Notes: This TV series contained several episodes related to Castlevania.; Simon Belmont assists Kevin (aka Captain N) as part of the N Team.; Dracula, known as "The Count", appears as a recurring enemy. Alucard makes a guest appearance in the third season.
Akumajō Densetsu — Shinsei Vampire Hunter June 1990 – Gamebook	Notes: The book is a sequel to Dracula's Curse, which features Sid Belmont, a descendant of Trevor Belmont.
Castlevania II: Simon's Quest July 1990 – Book	Notes: The book is a junior novel based on Castlevania II: Simon's Quest as part of the Worlds of Power book series.; The series was produced by Seth Godin.
Ganbare Goemon: Jigen Jō no Akumu 1993 – OVA	Notes: An OVA of Konami's Ganbare Goemon series. It features a short parody based on Castlevania.; It was released on VHS on 26th March, 1993. A 5th anniversary edition video case was also released in 1998.
Akumajō Dracula: Akuma no Chi Chi no Akumu: JP: June 9, 1992 – December 1, 1995; – Novel, Literary magazine	Notes: Published in the Japanese magazine LOGOUT from 1992 to 1995. Discontinued after magazine suspended publication.; The story is written by Ichiro Tezuka and is illustrated by Masaki Takahashi.; The first few issues of the story were released in novelized form on February 22, 1994.; Tezuka stated that, while the novel was originally intended to be a novelization of Super Castlevania IV, he decided to instead write a completely new story that was unrelated to the Castlevania storyline, although the characters are based upon those of the Castlevania series.
Dracula X: Nocturne in the Moonlight: JP: March 20, 1997; – Manga	Notes: Prelude to Symphony of the Night. The manga was available exclusively by pre-ordering the limited edition of Castlevania: Symphony of the Night.; Story and artwork by Ayami Kojima.
Castlevania: The Belmont Legacy: NA: 2005; – Graphic novel	Notes: The graphic novel is written by Marc Andreyko and illustrated by E. J. Su. It was published by IDW Publishing in five issues from March 30, 2005 to September 20, 2005.; The issues were together released in the form of paperback on November 1, 2005.; It is based on Castlevania: The Adventure for the Game Boy.
Akumajō Dracula: Yami no Juin – Fukushū no Jokyoku: JP: November 24, 2005; – Manga and soundtrack	Notes: Available as a pre-order bonus and contains sample soundtrack of the game on the CD and a manga.; The manga is a prelude to Curse of Darkness. It is however set in an alternate universe as confirmed by Ayami Kojima.
Castlevania: Curse of Darkness: JP: 2005, 2006; NA: September 1, 2008; January 1, 2009; – Manga	Notes: A two-volume comic created by Kou Sasakura which is a prequel to Curse of Darkness.; Known in Japan as Akumajō Dracula: Yami no Juin.; Published in Japan by Media Factory and in North America by Tokyopop.
Akumajō Dracula: Lament of Innocence: JP: February 2007 – April 2008; – Mobile comic	Notes: Comic adaptation of Lament of Innocence designed to be read on a cellphone.; 40 episodes of the comic were released.; Konami's mobile comic service "Weekly Konami" ended as of March 31, 2012. This comic can no longer be bought.
Akumajō Dracula: Radio Chronicle: JP: 2008; – Internet radio, CD	Notes: Japanese language only internet radio program aired on Konami Station in 2008.; A radio drama Akumajō Dracula X: Tsuioku no Yasōkyoku, Castlevania: The Adventure ReBirth and Contra ReBirth Original Soundtrack, Castlevania Best Music Collections BOX were aired on the program.; A special limited edition of the radio drama was released on CD was published by Konami Style on March 24, 2010 in Japan.
Akumajō Dracula X: Tsuioku no Yasōkyoku: JP: August – November 2008; – Internet radio, CD	Notes: A radio drama based on Symphony of the Night and takes place shortly afterwards the events of the game.; Originally aired as a feature of Akumajō Dracula: Radio Chronicle from August to November 2008.; Released on CD on March 24, 2010.
Akumajō Dracula: Kabuchi no Tsuisoukyoku September 27, 2008 – Literary magazine	Notes: The story was a part of the September 2008 issue of Dengeki Bunko Magazine.; Written by Ryōgo Narita under the supervision of Koji Igarashi.; The plot of the novel takes place one year after the events of Castlevania: Dawn of Sorrow.
Castlevania – The Concert February 19, 2010 – Concert	Notes: The first concert based on Castlevania.; Organized by David Westerlund and Erik Eklund. Performed by Michiru Yamane and Stockholm Youth Symphonic Orchestra.
Castlevania July 7, 2017 – May 13, 2021 – Netflix	Notes: Animated series based on Castlevania III: Dracula's Curse and Castlevania: Curse of Darkness.; Featuring the voice of Richard Armitage as Trevor Belmont.; Written by comic book author Warren Ellis.
Castlevania: Nocturne September 28, 2023 – present – Netflix	Notes: Animated series based on Castlevania: Rondo of Blood.; Set during the French Revolution.; Featuring the characters Richter Belmont and Maria Renard from Castlevania: Rondo of Blood / Castlevania: Dracula X.
Castlevania TBA, formerly cancelled – Film	Notes: The film was intended to be based on the video game series and focus on the origins of the main characters.; Paul W. S. Anderson was originally attached to write and direct the film, with filming planned to begin in Eastern Europe in 2006.; Anderson later stepped down from directing and Sylvain White joined the project to direct and assist with the script.; After White left the project, a new director was not found and the project become indefinitely on hold. James Wan (Saw, The Conjuring) then took over the director's chair with Paul W.S. Anderson still producing the film.

=== Music albums ===
Title	Release date	Length	Label	Ref.
Konami Game Music Collection Volume 1	August 5, 1988	59:30	King Records	
Akumajō Dracula Famicom Best (Note: The reprint of the album was released under the name Akumajō Dracula Best on September 23, 1998 along with the reprint of Akumajō Dracula Best 2.)	March 21, 1990	1:04:13	King Records	
Konami Famicom Music Memorial Best Vol. 3	February 21, 1991	1:09:23	King Records	
Akumajō Dracula Best 2 (Note: The reprint of the album was released under the same name along with the reprint of the first volume on September 23, 1998.)	December 5, 1991	1:38:39	King Records	
Perfect Selection: Dracula New Classic	April 22, 1992	43:36	King Records	
MIDI Power X68000 Collection ver 3.0	July 21, 1993	1:13:47	Konami	
Akumajo Dracula X	November 3, 1993	1:25:25	King Records	
Perfect Selection: Dracula Battle	July 21, 1994	43:42	King Records	
Perfect Selection: Dracula Battle II	June 25, 1995	42:13	King Records	
Castlevania: Symphony of the Night Music Sampler	January 1, 1997	1:12:07	Konami	
Dracula Music Collection	March 6, 1997	1:12:07	Konami	
Dracula X: Nocturne in the Moonlight OST	April 9, 1997	1:08:28	Konami	
Dracula X Remixes	October 3, 1997	50:09	King Records	
Akumajō Dracula MIDI Collection	October 22, 1997	53:50	King Records	
MIDI Power Pro 6 – Akumajo Dracula X Nocturne in the Moonlight	November 27, 1998	58:31	King Records	
Castlevania: The Original Game Soundtrack	March 26, 1999	1:13:22	King Records	
Castlevania Chronicle: Akumajo Dracula OST	May 23, 2001	2:32:21	Konami	
Castlevania: Circle of the Moon and Castlevania: Harmony of Dissonance OST	June 26, 2002	58:43	Konami	
Castlevania: Lament of Innocence Music Sampler	October 23, 2003	1:18:30	Konami	
Castlevania Special Music CD	November 27, 2003	1:14:29	Konami	
Konami Music Masterpiece Collection	October 1, 2004	5:18:41	Konami	
Castlevania: Curse of Darkness Limited Edition Soundtrack Sampler	October 2005	1:02:37	Konami	
Akumajō Dracula: Yami no Juin – Fukushū no Jokyoku	November 24, 2005	18:43	Konami	
Castlevania: Lament of Innocence OST	November 30, 2005	2:25:12	Konami	
Castlevania: Curse of Darkness OST	November 30, 2005	2:23:23	Konami	
Castlevania: Aria of Sorrow & Castlevania: Dawn of Sorrow OST	January 27, 2006	2:18:29	Konami	
Oretachi Game Center Zoku: Akumajo Dracula Music CD	May 25, 2006	22:58	Hamster	
Castlevania 20th Anniversary Premium Music Collection (Note: The CD was included in a pre-order bonus for Castlevania: Portrait of Ruin at GameStop, EB Games, and GameCrazy.) (Note: Also known as Castlevania 20th Anniversary Deluxe Music Collection.)	December 5, 2006	1:17:24	Konami	
Castlevania: Portrait of Ruin OST	March 23, 2007	2:29:57	Konami	
Konami Game Music: Classic Castlevania	May 15, 2007	24:45	Konami	
Castlevania: The Dracula X Chronicles OST	November 8, 2007	2:03:51	Konami	
Castlevania: Order of Ecclesia Soundtrack	October 23, 2008	14:10	Konami	
Castlevania: Order of Ecclesia OST	October 23, 2008	2:12:11	Konami	
Play! A Video Game Symphony Live!	January 9, 2009	1:14:16	JMP Productions	
Castlevania: Judgment OST	March 11, 2009	1:10:43	Konami	
Pachislot Akumajō Dracula OST	June 24, 2009	1:01:12	Konami	
Castlevania Best Music Collections BOX (Note: Largest Castlevania music album till date containing 1 DVD & 18 CDs.) (Note: The CDs contain the soundtracks and the DVD contains an interview with Michiru Yamane and videos of recording sessions.)	March 24, 2010	19:30:38	Konami	
Castlevania: The Adventure ReBirth and Contra ReBirth OST	March 24, 2010	1:13:26	Konami	
Pachislot Akumajō Dracula II OST	July 21, 2010	1:13:03	Konami	
Castlevania: Lords of Shadow OST	October 5, 2010	1:06:35	Konami	
Castlevania Tribute: Volume 1	January 13, 2011	1:04:21	Konami	
Castlevania Tribute: Volume 2	January 13, 2011	1:04:21	Konami	
Castlevania: Harmony of Despair OST	January 13, 2011	1:16:56	Konami	
Pachislot Akumajo Dracula III OST	February 22, 2012	1:13:44	Konami	
Castlevania: Lords of Shadow – Ultimate Edition Soundtrack	February 22, 2012	1:10:21; 1:43:27 (Note: Some songs of the soundtrack are exclusively available through the official website of Sumthing Distribution.)	Konami	
Castlevania: Lords of Shadow – Mirror of Fate (Original Game Soundtrack)	November 19, 2013	1:01:31	Konami	
Castlevania: Lords of Shadow 2 – Original Game Soundtrack	February 25, 2014	1:08:20; 1:44:00 (Note: Some songs of the soundtrack are exclusively available through the official website of Sumthing Distribution.)	Konami	
