= Akumajō Dracula =

Akumajō Dracula (Japanese: 悪魔城ドラキュラ, Hepburn: Akumajō Dorakyura; lit. "Demon Castle Dracula") is the Japanese name of the Castlevania video game series, as it is known worldwide. In Japan, several games within the series share the Akumajō Dracula name:

- Castlevania, a 1986 action-platform game developed and published by Konami for the Famicom Disk System and Nintendo Entertainment System.
- Vampire Killer, a 1986 platform game developed and published by Konami for the MSX2.
- Haunted Castle, a 1987 action-platform game developed and published by Konami for arcades.
- Super Castlevania IV, a 1991 action-platform game developed and published by Konami for the Super Nintendo Entertainment System.
- Akumajō Dracula, re-released as Castlevania Chronicles, a 1993 action-platform game developed and published by Konami for the X68000.
