= Castlevania II: Simon's Quest =

1987 video game

- North American NES box art
- Developer: Konami
- Publisher: Konami
- Director: Hitoshi Akamatsu
- Programmers: Nobuhiro Matsuoka; Yasuo Kuwahara
- Artist: Noriyasu Togakushi
- Composers: Kenichi Matsubara; Satoe Terashima Kouji Murata
- Series: Castlevania
- Platforms: Famicom Disk System, NES
- Release: Famicom Disk System: JP: August 28, 1987; NES: NA: November 24, 1988; PAL: February 1990
- Genres: Action role-playing, platform
- Mode: Single-player

Castlevania II: Simon's Quest (Note: Known in Japan as Dracula II: Noroi no Fūin (ドラキュラII 呪いの封印, Dorakyura Tsū: Noroi no Fūin; lit. "Dracula II: The Seal of the Curse")) is a 1987 action role-playing game developed and published by Konami. It was originally released in Japan in 1987 for the Famicom Disk System, and in North America in 1988 for the Nintendo Entertainment System. It is the second Castlevania game released for the NES, following the original Castlevania (1986). Set seven years after the events of the first installment, the player once again assumes the role of vampire hunter Simon Belmont, who is on a journey to undo a curse placed on him by Dracula at the end of their previous encounter. Dracula's body was split into five parts, which Simon must find and bring to the ruins of Castle Dracula in order to defeat him. The game deviates from the traditional platforming of its predecessor, incorporating role-playing and open world elements.

== Gameplay ==
The player-character Simon can buy items and talk to villagers for clues.

Gameplay in Castlevania II: Simon's Quest departs from the platforming genre of the first Castlevania, and introduces nonlinear gameplay and role-playing elements inspired by The Maze of Galious (1987), including a world map which the player is free to explore and revisit. Simon, controlled by the player, can talk with villagers who will offer him clues or lies. He can go to merchants who sell items, either for fighting enemies or for traversing to otherwise unreachable areas. To pay for them, he must collect hearts, which are dropped by defeated enemies. In addition to the ordinary items in Simon's inventory, he can purchase new whips in a few locations. Simon's Quest introduces an Experience Rating system, in which Simon's power level and maximum health may be increased by collecting a sufficient amount of hearts.

The period of time in Simon's Quest cycles between daytime and nightfall, which has an effect on the game and Simon's encounters. During the day, the enemies outside villages are weaker. At nighttime, they gain strength and inflict more damage to Simon's life points; though when defeated, they drop more hearts. The villagers and merchants in their respective locations are also no longer available to talk to and are replaced by zombies.

Some elements from the previous game return, including the Magic Weapons, which are secondary weapons to Simon's whip. One of them returning from Castlevania is the Holy Water, a small glass which can disintegrate walls that conceal hidden items. Simon's Quest introduces new Magic Weapons such as the Diamond, which attacks enemies while bouncing off any surrounding walls.

The objective of the game is to travel to the five mansions to find the five body parts of Dracula's corpse, and the Magic Cross. The body parts can be utilized to support Simon in the game. For example, Dracula's Rib can be used as a shield to block projectile attacks fired from an enemy. Finding all of the required items will allow Simon to clear the blockade in front of Dracula's castle to fight the last boss.

== Plot ==
The game takes place seven years after the original Castlevania. The prologue in the manual begins with Simon visiting his family's resting place. He encounters a young woman at the cemetery who tells him a curse was placed on him by Dracula during their last battle, and that Simon does not have long to live. The woman says the curse can be undone if he resurrects Dracula himself, explaining that Dracula's body was split into five parts after his defeat, and that Simon must find and bring them to the ruins of Dracula's castle. There, he must seal and defeat Dracula. The woman adds it is not guaranteed this will be Dracula's end.

After Simon defeats Dracula, there are three possible endings depending on the time the player takes to complete the game. In two, Simon sustains fatal injuries from the confrontation with Dracula and dies. The best ending is achieved when the player beats the game in eight game days.

== Development and release ==
Simon's Quest was designed by Hitoshi Akamatsu, who also directed Castlevania (1986) and Castlevania III: Dracula's Curse (1989) on the NES. It was released on the Famicom Disk System (FDS) on August 28, 1987 in Japan. Originally titled Dracula II in Japan, Akamatsu created the title Simon's Quest for release in Western territories. When asked if Metroid (1986) had any influence on the development of the game, Akamatsu instead cited The Maze of Galious (1987), another platform-adventure game by Konami that features puzzle solving and a world map. Most of the original artwork for Simon's Quest and other early Castlevania games was lost during the Great Hanshin earthquake of 1995.

Simon's Quest was converted to cartridge for release on the NES in North America in 1988, and in Europe in 1990. There are functional differences due to hardware differences between the FDS and cartridge. The FDS version features a progress saving feature, commonly seen on FDS games due to the rewritable floppy disk. The NES version instead uses a password function to save player progress. The FDS medium has a data storage limitation of 112 kilobytes of slow access, whereas bank-switching techniques and solid memory costs allow cartridges to have comparable data space with much faster access. The developers used the additional space to improve the music quality of the NES version, adding percussion samples and re-arranging the melodies to take advantage of the technology. Other changes were made to correct several grammatical and spelling errors in the translation, although the rendering of the protagonist's name as "Simmon Belmont" in the game's endings stayed.

Simon's Quest has seen several re-releases. On November 16, 2002, the game was included on Konami Collector's Series: Castlevania & Contra in North America, a PC collection of the Konami NES games via emulation. It has been re-released on other consoles through Nintendo's Virtual Console service. Simon's Quest is included in the North American and European versions of the NES Classic Edition, a miniature replica of the NES featuring many built-in games. It is also a part of the multi-platform Castlevania Anniversary Collection, a 2019 compilation of past Castlevania titles, and Simon's Quest has the distinction of being the only game in the collection that was released in Japan using the North American version instead of its Japanese counterpart.

=== Audio ===
Akumajō Dracula Famicom Best

Soundtrack album by Kinuyo Yamashita, Satoe Terashima, Kenichi Matsubara, Yoshinori Sasaki, Jun Funahashi, and Yukie Morimoto
- Released: March 21, 1990 (Japan)
- Genre: Video game soundtrack
- Length: 1:04:13

The game's soundtrack was composed by Kenichi Matsubara, who later created music for the Castlevania arcade game, Haunted Castle. "Bloody Tears" has since become a recurring song in the Castlevania franchise. The album Akumajō Dracula Famicom Best was released on March 20, 1990, with the catalog number KICA-1005, and a bonus sticker. It was reprinted under Akumajō Dracula Best Vol. 1 on September 23, 1998, with the catalog number KICA-7901. It included the FDS version of Simon's Quest's music, with three bonus tracks from the NES version. The disc includes the audio from Castlevania and Castlevania III: Dracula's Curse, covering 33 tracks with a total duration of 1:04.00. A vinyl record, also featuring both the FDS and NES music, was released by Mondo on January 11, 2017. Some reviewers have praised Matsubara's compositions. GameSpy called all of the music "incredible", and one of the first appearances of "classics like 'The Silence of Daylight'".

== Reception ==
Reception

Review scores
Publication	Score
Famitsu	28/40
GameSpot	6.5/10
GameTrailers	7.5/10
IGN	7/10

The game sold over 1 million units.

The game garnered positive reviews following its release, and received the reputation of a Nintendo classic over time. Japanese game magazine Famitsu gave it a score of 28 out of 40. American publication Computer Entertainer wrote that it "outdoes its predecessor in every way" with "better graphics, more challenges" and "more variety in settlings" while concluding it "is a very well crafted" action-adventure that "provides excellent play value, superb graphics, lots of music, and some special touches that add to the enjoyment of the game."

In 1990, Nintendo Power's NES retrospective Pak Source gave Simon's Quest ratings of 4.5/5 for Graphic and Sound, 4/5 for Play Control, 4/5 for Challenge, and 4/5 for Theme Fun. In 2008, Nintendo Power ranked it as the 15th best NES game, comparing it to Zelda II: The Adventure of Link in how it successfully added role-playing video game elements to its series. In a 1997 Castlevania retrospective, GamePro called it "an excellent time-killer, and much longer than the first Castlevania". IGN called Simon's Quest the "perfect game to play during 1988". It praised the theme of exploration, acknowledged the evolution of the series, and lauded its graphical and audio presentation.

Retrospective reviews of Simon's Quest have been more critical. Points of criticism were made about backtracking, easy bosses, and the day-to-night cycle. A common complaint was its English localization, with cryptic and poorly translated clues from non-player characters. Former Castlevania producer, Koji Igarashi, revealed that the NPCs in the Japanese version were deliberate liars. GameSpot said that the subtle hints from the Japanese version were lost in translation, such as the infamous line "hit Deborah Cliff with your head to make a hole". Active Gaming Media showed that the Japanese text was similarly misleading, but further described where and how an accurate hint from the Japanese game was lost. Further criticism stemmed from some of the game's puzzles, which have no clues at all, such as a scenario where Simon must summon a tornado at Deborah Cliff with the Red Crystal. 1UP.com said the game required a walkthrough because of its non-explanatory nature. Game Informer said that while the game is important in gaming history, it was still a polarizing game due to "cryptic puzzles" and other difficult elements.

=== Legacy ===
Simon's Quest is the second Castlevania game to depart from linear gameplay, following Vampire Killer for the MSX2 in 1986, and instead feature a non-linear explorative world. This design has been compared to Nintendo's Metroid series, yielding the Metroidvania subgenre. The game's exploration system and ideas introduced adventure elements to the series, and it would heavily influence future games. The first game that drew inspiration from it was Castlevania: Symphony of the Night. Igarashi, Symphony of the Night's assistant director, said the critical reaction to Simon's Quest and its gameplay allowed the game to be pitched to Konami. Simon's Quest would be directly referenced in later Castlevania games. In the Game Boy Advance entry, Castlevania: Harmony of Dissonance, the protagonist Juste Belmont recounts when his grandfather Simon had to go search for Dracula's body parts. In the game, the player must find them again.

== In other media ==
The front page of Nintendo Power #2 received complaints from parents.

Upon its release, Simon's Quest was briefly the subject of controversy when it received strong publicity in the second issue of Nintendo Power. Its front page had a costumed model dressed as Simon Belmont, holding Dracula's severed head. This cover provoked many telephone complaints from parents of children who purchased the magazine, stating that it gave their children nightmares. Nintendo Power covered this in issue 50, citing this as its worst cover. Simon's Quest was referenced in a following issue in a Howard and Nester comic strip.

Simon's Quest was followed by the release of merchandise. In 1988, Tiger Electronics released a handheld game and an LCD wristwatch based on Simon's Quest. Promotional collector's cards were also available in Japan. In 2007, a figurine of Simon's appearance from Simon's Quest was included as a pre-order bonus for Castlevania: The Dracula X Chronicles.

Worlds of Power, a 1990s series of books with stories based on Nintendo games, has a novel about Simon's Quest. It was written by Christopher Howell, and the series was produced by Seth Godin. It departs from the original plot and introduces characters not seen in the game, including junior high school student Timothy Bradley, a video gamer who crosses over into the world of Simon's Quest and assists Simon in looking for Dracula's body parts.
