= Castlevania: Order of Shadows =

2007 video game

- Developer: Konami Mobile
- Director: Victor Rodriguez
- Designer: Tyrone Rodriguez
- Artists: Dan Baker; Hans Vancol
- Composer: Vincent Diamante
- Series: Castlevania
- Platforms: Java Platform, Micro Edition; Windows Mobile
- Release: NA: September 18, 2007
- Genre: Action-adventure
- Mode: Single-player

Castlevania: Order of Shadows is a mobile game developed for the Java Platform, Micro Edition, and released by Konami in September 2007.

== Gameplay ==
Order of Shadows is a platform game with RPG characteristics, with gameplay similar to that of Castlevania: Symphony of the Night and other games in the series. The player character is Desmond Belmont, the latest in the line of Belmont family members to star in a Castlevania game. Like other members of the family, he wields a whip as his main weapon which is supplemented with additional sub weapons like throwing axes and vials of holy water that act as firebombs.

The game features the ability to swap out the existing soundtrack with songs from the original Castlevania.

== Plot ==
The player takes control as Desmond Belmont, the heir of the Vampire Killer whip. Desmond Belmont and his two sisters, Zoe and Dolores, search Dracula's castle for a cult called "The Order" that is trying to resurrect Dracula. This game takes place in the late 17th century, and is a side story to the original series.

== Development ==
Originally, the storyline was around a character named Gryff LaRue and his family of "mages and witches", but was modified as the Belmont clan has always been portrayed as a "family of warriors". After the rewrite, the story was changed to be more similar to traditional Castlevania stories, and made Desmond Belmont wield a whip instead of an axe or sword. The game was built "from the ground up" to be played on cell phones.

== Reception ==
IGN rated the game 6.7, calling it "decent", and with little replay value compared to other Castlevania entries. 1UP.com has given it a D−, calling it a "major disappointment". Wired rated the game 3 out of 10, praising the game's music, but calling it far too short and easy to complete.
