= Simon Belmont =

Castlevania series character

- Castlevania character
- Simon Belmont from Castlevania: Grimoire of Souls.
- First game: Castlevania (1986)
- Created by: Akihiko Nagata
- Voiced by: English: Keith Silverstein (Castlevania Judgment, Super Smash Bros. Ultimate, V Rising); Alec Newman (Castlevania: Lords of Shadow – Mirror of Fate); Andrew Kavadas (Captain N: The Game Master); Ryan Drees (Castlevania: Grimoire of Souls); Japanese: Hideo Ishikawa (DreamMix TV World Fighters, Super Smash Bros. Ultimate, Castlevania: Grimoire of Souls); Kenichi Suzumura (Castlevania Judgment)

In-universe information
- Weapon: Vampire Killer whip

Simon Belmont (シモン・ベルモンド, Shimon Berumondo; Simon Belmondo) is a character who serves as the first protagonist to appear in Konami's Castlevania video game series. He appears in its namesake first installment, Vampire Killer, Haunted Castle, Castlevania II: Simon's Quest, Super Castlevania IV and Castlevania Chronicles, as well acting as a supporting character in Castlevania Judgment and Castlevania: Harmony of Despair. He also appeared as a playable character in DreamMix TV World Fighters and Super Smash Bros. Ultimate. Simon has received positive reviews from critics.

== Conception and design ==
During development, Simon was originally named Peter Dante (a reference to Peter Cushing and Joe Dante), a vampire killer who was a grandson of Christopher Dante (a reference to Christopher Lee). Simon being armed with a whip was because director Hitoshi Akamatsu liked the mechanics of a weapon able to repel enemies, and also because he was a fan of Raiders of the Lost Ark. His character design on the packaging was directly drawn from a Frank Frazetta painting, The Norseman.

Simon was redesigned for the video games Castlevania Chronicles by Ayami Kojima and Castlevania Judgment by Takeshi Obata, artist of the manga Death Note. Series director Koji Igarashi emphasized that these designs were different from what he envisioned, Simon in particular, but commented that this was how Obata envisioned them. He added that while the design felt radically different, so did Kojima's. Simon's design by Obata was criticized, which was perceived as too derivative of Obata's work on Death Note.

He was originally planned to be the lead character in the reboot, Castlevania: Lords of Shadow, before development changed the story to be about Gabriel Belmont.

== Appearances ==
In 1691, Simon Belmont kills Count Dracula in an event that is retold in multiple games (Castlevania, Vampire Killer, Haunted Castle, Super Castlevania IV, and Castlevania Chronicles). By the events of Castlevania II: Simon's Quest, the now deceased Dracula has placed a curse on Simon and all of Transylvania. Simon breaks the curse by gathering and incinerating Dracula's remains, though it is hinted that Dracula will return when his skinless hand rises from his grave. Simon is one of only two Belmonts to have faced Dracula twice in his lifetime, the other being his ancestor Christopher.

In Haunted Castle, Simon is blue-haired and has a wife called Selena, who is kidnapped by Dracula directly after their marriage. It is actually unknown if this is Simon at all. The guide to the game calls him Simons, a descendant of the canonical Simon, while a newsletter by Konami itself names him William.

Although Simon is the first Belmont to appear in a Castlevania game, in the Belmont lineage, Leon Belmont originates the direct bloodline of the clan. It can then be presumed that he is followed by Trevor, Christopher, Soleil, Simon, Juste, Richter, and then Julius. In Castlevania: Harmony of Dissonance, Simon is playable in the Boss Rush mode, looking exactly as he did in Castlevania. In Castlevania: Harmony of Despair, Simon is an extra character purchased as downloadable content, the sprite from the original game also being reused here. A special stage that recreates the game's castle layout can also be purchased.

Simon Belmont appears in the rebooted series Castlevania: Lords of Shadow – Mirror of Fate, as the son of Trevor Belmont and Sypha Belnades, and grandson of Gabriel Belmont, later known as Dracula. He seeks revenge for the murder of his parents and throughout the game is unaware that Dracula is his grandfather.

Simon's Castlevania Judgment incarnation was designed by Death Note artist Takeshi Obata. He has red-orange hair comparable to that of Light Yagami (the protagonist of Death Note), a jacket with many belts on it that exposes his muscular chest, and bandages on his forearms. The Bradygames Official Guide states that Simon is 23 years old and approximately 185 cm (6 ft 1 in).

=== In other media ===
Simon appeared in Captain N: The Game Master, a television cartoon featuring characters from contemporary games released for the Nintendo Entertainment System. He is depicted as an arrogant and egotistical vampire hunter who competes with the main character Kevin Keene for the heroine Princess Lana, who he carries a torch for. Simon has a whip and a backpack of resources which he uses throughout the series. His appearance in the cartoon was met with criticism. Ben Rhudy of Monsters and Critics stated that he looks nothing like his video game counterpart, and that the show's creator DiC should have consulted the game before choosing this design. CBR is critical of the "cowardly" portrayal of Simon in the cartoon series, and felt that the creators should have drawn more from the source material.

Worlds of Power, a 1990s series of books with stories based on Nintendo games, has a novel about Simon's Quest. It was written by Christopher Howell, and the series was produced by Seth Godin. It departs from the original plot and introduces characters not seen in the game, including junior high school student Timothy Bradley, a video gamer who crosses over into the world of Simon's Quest and assists Simon in looking for Dracula's body parts.

Simon also appears in several games outside the Castlevania franchise including the 2003 crossover fighting game DreamMix TV World Fighters, the 2017 action game Super Bomberman R, and the 2018 crossover fighting game Super Smash Bros. Ultimate, as well receiving an amiibo figure later. He also debuted as a playable fighter in Brawlhalla on October 19, 2022. First 4 Figures made a figure of Simon as part of a line of Halloween figures which was modeled at the original NES box art. The vampire survival game V Rising by Stunlock Studios added Simon Belmont Vampire Hunter as an optional boss upon its version 1.0 release on May 8, 2024.

== Reception ==
CBR refers to Simon as the face of the Castlevania series, having been the protagonist of the original game, as well as multiple games overall. This is also the view of TheGamer, who calls him "the face of the franchise and the Belmont who started it all, Simon had headlined more games than any other Belmont in the series." In another discussion of the Castlevania characters, TheGamer celebrates Simon's multiple character designs, and decides that he is the most legendary vampire hunter of the Belmont clan.

Nintendo Power listed Simon as its seventh favorite hero, stating that while it respects all of the vampire hunters in Castlevania, he was the first. According to Nintendo Power, the worst cover for a Nintendo Power was one depicting Simon Belmont holding the severed head of Dracula (the scene was a depiction of Castlevania II). It is considered the worst cover because hundreds of parents called in to complain about the goriness of the cover. It was reported in the complaints that children suffered nightmares resulting from the image. The use of a whip is considered one of the features that makes Simon Belmont a memorable hero character, which is echoed by CBR in saying "he's not Simon Belmont unless he cracks out his classic whip." GamesRadar+ stated that Simon Belmont deserves his own movie, while Kotaku expressed concern that in such a movie Simon might be armed with a sword instead of whip. GamesRadar+ also called Simon in Castlevania Judgement sexy and said that "Simon's Judgment apparel is a lot of belts and leather wrapped around an exposed torso". Game Informer criticized the character design in Castlevania Judgement. Chris Morgan for Yardbarker described Simon as one of "the most memorable characters from old school Nintendo games".

Complex Networks listed Simon as a top 10 best vampire hunter in video games, and top 2 among most drastic character makeovers in gaming.

Simon Belmont's inclusion in the roster of Super Smash Bros. Ultimate was received enthusiastically. Before his inclusion in Super Smash Bros. Ultimate, multiple gaming websites called for his inclusion, including GameRadar, Game Informer and Complex. He has been described as a fan favorite character. USgamer praised the addition as he defines "old school Nintendo nostalgia". VentureBeat also praised for giving a neglected character a chance. While Destructoid praised and said "The axe, the cross, the holy water items, they're all here, and they work wonderfully within the confines of Smash". Polygon ranked Simon as top 12 character in Super Smash Bros. Ultimate, while Paste magazine ranked him as top 5. Gavin Jasper of Den of Geek ranked Simon as 48th of Super Smash Bros. Ultimate characters, criticizing his appearances as it lacks the impact of most of the other guest characters. HobbyConsolas included Simon Belmont on its "The 30 best heroes of the last 30 years."
