= Vampire Season Monster Defense =

2012 video game

Vampire Season - Monster Defense
- Vampire Season - Monster Defense
- Developer: Brainz
- Platforms: iOS, iPad, iPhone, iPod Touch, Android
- Release: June 28, 2012
- Genre: real-time strategy
- Modes: Single player Asynchronous Gameplay

Vampire Season - Monster Defense is a tower defense/strategy video game produced by Colombian studio Brainz. It was released on June 28, 2012 for iOS devices.

== Plot ==
Vlad Cosmo Tepes, better known as Count Dracula and as one of the most notable vampires in history, has been hunted (unsuccessfully) for centuries by the Van Helsing clan. He used to reside in a secret castle in Transylvania until 2012, when Anthony Van Helsing revealed his location, resulting in one of the largest vamphunts in history, also known as The Great Hunt. Now, thanks to the 21st century's general lack of online privacy, Dracula's secret hideout has been revealed and it's up to players' defense and strategy skills to protect him from a horde of big game hunters.

== Gameplay ==
There are thirty levels spread across three themed chapters. Survival mode lets the player create a load-out of six ally types to take into battle.

== Features ==
* Defenders and items: Players are able to place defenders and items on the map to stop their enemies.

* Dual resources: Players must manage both Fear and Style in order to purchase defenses.

* Combinations: Some combinations of items and monsters generate new creatures, such as the Zampire.

* Spells: Spells that benefit the player in different ways and cost no resources. The initial release of the game included 3 spells (Damage, Healing, Stunning).

== Main characters ==
Count Dracula: Dracula became a vampire in 1476. Ever since his conversion to vampirism he has been haunted by visions of the Van Helsing clan, and by his middle name, which he got rid of in 1882. In 1482, during one of his Paris visits, he fell in love with a particular painting: "Poker chiens". Aided by the Hunchback of Notre Dame, he was able to "secure" the painting, thus starting what would become the world's largest collection of paintings depicting Dogs Playing Poker.

Dracula has lived in Transylvania for most of his life, but he has been known to visit other places occasionally. He never travels without his trusty Castle Regent, whose family has been at the service of the Count for over five centuries.

Castle Regent: The Castle Regent is a loyal friend of Dracula, and his family has been in service of the Count for generations. In fact, they have been Castle Regents for so long, that they forgot their original name and use Regent as a family name. The Castle Regent was the son of Castle Regent. He followed in his father's footsteps shortly after his father kicked the bucket. (Literally, he tripped on a bucket and fell to the castle's moat). For years he has been helping out Dracula with his particular collection of yard ornaments and generally tacky stuff, even though he would prefer a more gothic approach to the decoration.

His life as regent had been uneventful up to the night when Van Helsing decided to reveal the castle's location, effectively leading to The Great Hunt. In the game, the player aids Castle Regent, who is the brains behind all the operation. He is not a selectable monster, but instead is the character driving the plot, appearing in all in-game cinematics.

Anthony Van Helsing: Anthony Van Helsing was a prominent member of the Van Helsing Clan, madly bent on the destruction of Count Dracula. He was born within the spiraling madness of the Van Helsing family. The only subjects of conversation at dinner were Dracula's demise and sword fighting. He became inevitably obsessed with the Count and spent most of his youth training to become a vampire killing machine.

== In-game characters ==
Vampire: Vampires are one of the most ancient supernatural creatures, with some scholars speculating their origin as far back as Cain himself. Other scholars claim they go back to the T-Rex.

Werewolf: Werewolves almost became extinct in the early 1900s. They are half-human and half-wolf. In no particular order. They are highly attuned to nature and possess heightened senses of smell and sight. Werewolves have been around since the dawn of civilization. Contrary to popular belief, they have not always been at odds with vampires. They just had one huge disagreement, but they get along pretty well most of the time.

Werewolves are playable defenders in the game. They are basic units and probably the most versatile defender in the game, as their only weakness is sunlight. If a werewolf walks through sunlight, he becomes weakened, effectively reducing his life and damage by 50%. When placed on the map, they will howl increasing ally damage for a short period of time.

Zombie: Zombies are the result of diverse causes: Voodoo, Hoodoo, comic books, etc. They have been increasing their numbers in order to meet the expectations set by diverse media about the zombie apocalypse, and attend rehearsals every Monday at 6 pm. They are qualified as a basic unit. Although their life and damage are similar to the Werewolf, their Zombie nature makes them extra squishy.

Zombies are resistant to Magic Damage, receiving only 50% damage when faced against it but receive 50% more damage from Physical Attacks.

Skeleton: Skeletons are cousins to both Mummies and Zombies, but are still different enough to have their own seat and representative in the M.E.M.E. Skeletons are usually created by Necromancers or Warlocks by reanimating corpses. Because of the intrinsic details of the spell used by them, Skeletons lose all flesh and rise as pure bone.

Since the late 1970s, batteries have been added to Skeletons to give them extra durability. How this works is still a mystery, well protected by Necromancers around the world.

Skeletons are playable defenders in the game and are qualified as a medium unit. Their high life and resistance to physical damage make Skeletons a great choice for taking on various enemies.

Imp: Imps are mischievous, playful and somewhat naked. They hail from the depths of the underworld where they are usually forced to perform menial tasks. That is why they jump at the chance of joining the human world hoping for a better future.

They are a medium unit, although their life is the lowest of any defender, and can usually be killed in one hit.

Imps deal Magic Damage at a very long range and, while placed on the map, generate 1 Fear point every 10 seconds.

Manny The Mummy: Manny is said to be the second oldest active mummy in the world, the oldest one being his wife Fanny. He is a powerful supernatural creature who is fiercely protective of Count Dracula and plays a vital role in the Count's survival of The Great Hunt. Manny was a revered prophet in Ancient Egypt. He had visions that helped guide the progress of Egyptian culture, the pyramid being one of his greatest accomplishments. (Before Manny, Egyptians were planning to bury their Pharaohs beneath cubes). Unfortunately, he didn't manage to predict that he would be poisoned by his sister-in-law.

In the game, he can be used only once per level. He is qualified as an elite unit. Manny can cast "The Mummy's Curse" (20% probability per hit), which will wrap almost any enemy in mummy bandages, causing heavy damage (15% of the enemies' life after 3 seconds).

Fanny The Mummy: Fanny the mummy, a very special little lady. Is the oldest active mummy in the world, making her also the strongest one. She is married to Manny the Mummy, and was once Queen of Mummydom before abdicating to follow Manny in his adventures in the human world. She used to be a prophet and revered oracle in Ancient Egypt. She took Manny under her wing when he was just a child, and taught him the art of divination. She died of natural causes and was mummified by her followers who were certain she was an emissary from Isis. They performed a ritual to steal her prophetic abilities, but instead ended up reviving her as an active mummy. She was really upset.

in the game, Fanny is a purchasable defender and is the most powerful monster that can be placed on the map (superior to Manny). She can be used only once per level. She is qualified as an elite unit. Fanny can cast "The Mummy's Curse" (20% probability per hit), which will wrap almost any enemy in mummy bandages, causing heavy damage (25% of the enemies' life after 3 seconds). This is a stronger version of Manny's ability.

Ghost: Ghosts are the remaining energy of someone who died... with too much energy. Game show hosts are perfect Ghost candidates. In the game, they are qualified as a power unit. Although they don't have a lot of life, they usually make up for it with their resistance to physical damage. Ghosts deal Magic Damage at a very short range but are very weak against Magic Damage, receiving triple damage when attacked.

Warlock: Warlocks are humans that struck a deal with a supernatural entity in exchange for magical prowess. Most of them attended wizardry school at some point, but dropped out because they found it "too nerdy". In the game, they are qualified as a High-End Unit and deal Magic Damage at a long range, slowing the movement of any enemies that enter their range by 50%.

== Reception ==
- Gamezone.com scored it as a great game, giving it 8/10.
- Gamezebo.com says it's a great reminder of real time strategy and tower defense games, and scored it 4/5.
- Gametrailers.com claims “it should go straight to the top of your download list.”
- GamingIllustrated.com says "Vampire Season will appeal to anyone with even the slightest interest in tower defence games or zombies. Yes, zombies and evil-things of the night are becoming a little long in the tooth now, but when they look and play this well do we really care? Vampire Season is a must own iOS title if you want to show off the power of your mighty iPad."
- InsiderMobileApps.com states "is a high quality game with great production values. Its 3D in-game graphics are clear and animate smoothly, while between levels some entertaining and amusing cutscenes give a sense of unfolding — if rather silly — narrative to the proceedings. It feels like a highly-polished game, in short, and it will likely attract many players due to its price point."
