= Christopher Howell =

American poet, editor, and educator (born 1945)

Christopher Howell (born August 29, 1945) is an American poet, editor, and educator. He has published nine books of poetry.

Born in Portland, Oregon, Howell served as a journalist for the U.S. Navy during the Vietnam War. He earned a B.S. from Oregon State University in 1968, an M.A. from Portland State University in 1971, and an MFA from the MFA Program for Poets & Writers at the University of Massachusetts Amherst in 1973. He also attended Pacific Lutheran University in Tacoma, Washington.

Starting in 1972, Howell served as the director and principal editor for Lynx House Press, which awards the Blue Lynx Prize for Poetry. Lynx House was founded in Amherst, Massachusetts, USA in the 1970s by Howell, along with David Lyon and Helena Minton. In 1996 the press moved to its present location in Spokane, Washington where, in 2005, it became an impress of Eastern Washington University Press; in 2010 it became an independent and non-profit literary publisher. The press, in addition to hosting the Blue Lynx Prize, also publishes other books of poetry.

Howell is also editor of Willow Springs Books, director of the former Eastern Washington University Press, and on the faculty of the Master of Fine Arts Program in Creative Writing at Eastern Washington University.

His daughter, Emma Howell, was an aspiring poet and student at Oberlin College who died at age 20 in June 2001. Her family published her poems posthumously in a volume titled Slim Night of Recognition.

== Books of poetry ==
- The Crime of Luck
- Sweet Afton: Poems
- Sea Change
- Though Silence: The Ling Wei Poems
- Memory and Heaven
- Just Waking
- Light's Ladder
- Dreamless and Possible: Poems New and Selected
- Gaze

== Awards ==
- National Endowment for the Arts fellowships (won two)
- Oregon Arts Commission grant
- Washington State Governor's Award (1986)
- Vi Gale Award
- Adrienne Lee Award
- Pushcart Prizes (three)
- Vachel Lindsay prize
- Helen Bullis prize

== Other publications ==
Howell's poems have been anthologized (including twice in the Pushcart Anthology) and have appeared in journals, including Harper's, The Hudson Review, The Iowa Review, Poetry Northwest and The Gettysburg Review.
