= Haunted Castle (video game) =

1987 video game

- North American arcade flyer
- Developer: Konami
- Publisher: Konami
- Designer: Masaaki Kukino
- Composers: Kenichi Matsubara; Masahiro Ikariko "T"
- Series: Castlevania
- Platform: Arcade
- Release: NA/EU: December 26, 1987; JP: February 22, 1988
- Genre: Platform
- Mode: Single-player

Haunted Castle (Note: Known in Japan as Akumajō Dracula (悪魔城ドラキュラ, Akumajō Dorakyura; Demon Castle Dracula)) is a 1987 platform game developed and published by Konami for arcades. It is the second arcade game in the Castlevania franchise, following VS. Castlevania, an arcade port of the original 1986 NES video game released in North America. Unlike the previous arcade title in the franchise, Haunted Castle is not a direct port of an existing console game, but a newly-developed arcade game running on a custom JAMMA-based board. The game has the player controlling Simon Belmont, who embarks on a journey to save his wife Selena from the clutches of Dracula.

A remake of Haunted Castle, Haunted Castle Revisited, was released in 2024 as part of the Castlevania Dominus Collection compilation.

== Gameplay ==
Gameplay screenshot

Haunted Castle is a platform game with six stages, which are played through in a linear progression. The player controls the main character Simon Belmont, whose primary weapon is a whip. He must fight various enemies which consist partially of skeletons, zombies, mermen, and hunchbacks. By destroying certain enemies, he can upgrade his primary weapon first to a more powerful spiked morning star, then to a sword. In addition, various "sub-weapons" can be obtained which provide different means of attack which consist of bombs (powerful ground attack), boomerangs (straight attack), stopwatches (freezes enemies), crosses (powerful straight attack), and torches (continuous ground attack). Hearts are collected to use the sub-weapons. The player can only carry one sub-weapon at a time.

Each of Haunted Castle's six levels concludes with a boss fight. Like in other games of the series, these bosses are generally taken from horror literature or legend, and include Medusa, Frankenstein's monster, and Dracula himself.

Multiple board versions exist, all of which have varying levels of difficulty. Version M is considered the most challenging, Version K and Version J are regarded as being easier to play.

== Development ==
=== Audio ===
The soundtrack was composed in part by Kenichi Matsubara, who previously worked on the soundtrack of Castlevania II: Simon's Quest. There are several music tracks in Haunted Castle that have been reused in other Castlevania games. "Bloody Tears", first heard in the previously released Castlevania II, is used as the theme for Stage 3. Another arcade piece, the Stage 1 theme "Cross Your Heart", was reused in Castlevania: Portrait of Ruin under the title "Crucifix Held Close" and as an unlockable song in Castlevania: The Dracula X Chronicles. It is part of the "Akumajo Dracula Medley" that appears in Konami's Dance Dance Revolution Ultramix 3 (originally appearing in the Japanese arcade and PlayStation 2 music game series Keyboardmania), along with "Bloody Tears". "Clockwork's Beat", which plays during Stage 5, was remixed in Castlevania: Dawn of Sorrow under the name "Underground Melodies" (actually the name of Haunted Castle's Stage 4 theme). Finally, "Don't Wait Until Night", played during Stage 6, which borrows hints of "The Silence of Daylight" (the town music from Castlevania II),, was remixed in Castlevania: Aria of Sorrow for Julius' theme "Heart of Fire", though this particular song is actually a medley of the Haunted Castle tune and "Heart of Fire" from Stage 5 of the original Castlevania.

=== Releases ===
A PlayStation 2 port of Haunted Castle was released by Hamster Corporation in May 2006 as part of the Oretachi Gēsen Zoku series. This port was only released in Japan.

Hamster Corporation released the game as part of their Arcade Archives series for the PlayStation 4 in 2017 and Nintendo Switch in 2021. This version includes the option to play the Japanese, North American and European versions of the game. Haunted Castle is also included in Konami's Arcade Classics Anniversary Collection, released digitally on April 19, 2019 for the Nintendo Switch, PlayStation 4, Xbox One and Windows (via Steam). Unlike the stand-alone Arcade Archive release, local versions based on the player's region are used.

Haunted Castle is included in the Castlevania Dominus Collection, released in August 2024 for the PlayStation 5, Xbox Series X/S, Nintendo Switch, and Windows (via Steam). The collection includes a reimagining by M2, Haunted Castle Revisited, which features updated graphics and sound, rebalanced difficulty, and many other changes.

== Reception ==
Reception

Aggregate score
Aggregator	Score
OpenCritic	96% recommend (Revisited, part of Dominus Collection)

Review score
Publication	Score
Micom BASIC Magazine	1.5/6

Award
Publication	Award
Gamest Mook (1998)	Best Graphic Award 10th Best VGM Award 7th

In Japan, Game Machine listed Haunted Castle on their April 1, 1988, issue as being the sixth most popular arcade game at the time.

Time Extension placed Haunted Castle last on its list of ranked Castlevania games. It was described that "It starts off well enough; the sprites are nice and large (a fact that makes it hard to avoid danger) and there are some amazing tunes here. However, the brutal difficulty level is clearly designed to suck in coins, and the controls feel stiff and awkward. [...] Outside of saying you've played it, there's little reason to seek this one out. It's dreadful."
