= Castlevania Chronicles =

2001 video game

- North American PlayStation box art
- Developers: Konami (X68000); KCET (PlayStation)
- Publisher: Konami
- Directors: Hideo Ueda; Masayuki Umasaki (PlayStation)
- Producer: Koji Igarashi (PlayStation)
- Artist: Ayami Kojima (PlayStation)
- Composers: Shin-chan; Keizo Nakamura; Hiroshi Kobayashi; Sota Fujimori (PlayStation)
- Series: Castlevania
- Platforms: X68000, PlayStation
- Release: X68000: JP: July 23, 1993; PlayStation: JP: May 24, 2001; NA: October 9, 2001; EU: November 9, 2001
- Genre: Platform
- Mode: Single-player

Castlevania Chronicles (Note: Known in Japan as Akumajō Nendaiki (Japanese: 悪魔城年代記; lit. "Demon Castle Chronicles")) is a 2001 platform game developed by Konami Computer Entertainment Tokyo and published by Konami for the PlayStation. It includes two distinct game modes: Original Mode and Arrange Mode. Original Mode is a direct port of the 1993 game Akumajō Dracula (Note: Japanese: 悪魔城ドラキュラ, Hepburn: Akumajō Dorakyura; lit."Demon Castle Dracula") for the X68000 home computer. This version of Akumajō Dracula is itself a remake of the original Castlevania, which was released for the Nintendo Entertainment System in 1986. Players control Simon Belmont, a vampire hunter who has entered Dracula's castle to defeat him and save Transylvania.

Arrange Mode offers a modernized experience with enhanced features, including a new introductory cinematic, updated sprites, re-balanced gameplay and a remade soundtrack. These enhancements aim to make the game more accessible to contemporary players while preserving the core elements of the original.

Castlevania Chronicles was later made available as a PSone Classic on the PlayStation Network in December 2008.

== Gameplay ==
Players can use Simon's whip to diagonally attack enemies below him while jumping.

Akumajō Dracula was designed to take full advantage of the X68000 hardware, featuring an updated and more complex game engine than the original Castlevania. This enhancement allowed for redesigned stages that included intricate and dynamic obstacles, as well as the addition of new, exclusive stages. One notable gameplay feature is the ability to attack enemies and obstacles diagonally from below. The game retains all the special items and sub-weapons from the original, while introducing a new rare item called the herb, which can refill the player's health in exchange for hearts. Hidden items that grant points and 1-ups are scattered throughout the game and can be found by ducking or standing in specific locations.

The game also maintains Castlevania's "looping" feature, where it tracks the number of stages a player has cleared across consecutive playthroughs before reaching a Game Over. Unlike the original Castlevania's single higher difficulty setting activated during a second playthrough, the X68000 version of Akumajō Dracula allows for six consecutive playthroughs with increasing difficulty levels before reaching its maximum difficulty cap.

Castlevania Chronicles includes an Arrange Mode that adjusts the game balance for a more accessible experience. This mode offers a modernized take on the game with enhanced features such as a new introductory cinematic, updated sprites, and re-balanced gameplay. Completing Arrange Mode unlocks special features, including an art gallery and a Time Attack Mode. Exclusive to the U.S. and European versions of Chronicles, the art gallery showcases artwork by Ayami Kojima for both Chronicles and Castlevania: Symphony of the Night, along with an interview with Koji Igarashi (IGA). The Time Attack Mode allows players to race through any stage with a time meter, encouraging them to beat their best times.

== Development ==
The development of Akumajō Dracula for the X68000 was driven by a desire to enhance the original Castlevania game for the Famicom while leveraging the advanced capabilities of the X68000 hardware. Director Hideo Ueda and his team aimed to maintain the essence of the original game, acknowledging its old-fashioned nature while improving it visually and technically. They utilized the X68000's superior processing power to introduce smoother animations and more detailed environments, such as the flowing water in the fountain and the intricate gears in the clock tower. The release of the X68030 during development also prompted the team to make subtle adjustments that took advantage of the newer hardware's capabilities, resulting in even smoother animations and enhanced visual effects for users of the X68030 model.

The development process for Akumajō Dracula involved a collaborative and iterative approach, where individual team members would present their ideas and receive feedback from the rest of the team. This method allowed for continuous refinement and incorporation of only the best ideas into the final product. Ueda emphasized the importance of maintaining a balance between technological advancements and gameplay quality. The development team faced various challenges, including the need to accommodate different hardware specifications and the inclusion of intricate design elements that pushed the X68000's capabilities.

The PlayStation re-release, Castlevania Chronicles, expanded on the X68000 game. This includes a new rendered intro and ending, with new character designs by Ayami Kojima for Simon Belmont and Dracula, improved graphical effects, enhanced music and sound effects, and a more balanced and adjustable difficulty level. Players can choose to play this "Arrange Mode" version of the game with all of the new features intact, or play the "Original Mode" version as it was originally presented on the X68000.

== Audio ==
The music for the X68000 game, "Akumajou Dracula", was composed to take full advantage of the system's advanced audio capabilities, offering players a rich auditory experience that varied significantly depending on the chosen sound module. The game supported several sound modules including the X68000's native FM Synthesizer (Yamaha YM2151), as well as multiple MIDI modules such as the Roland LA (MT-32, CM-32L, CM-64) and Roland GS (SC-55, SC-33, SC-155, CM-300, CM-500).

The soundtrack itself featured a mix of new compositions and re-arranged classics from the series, designed to showcase the full potential of these sound modules. Hiroshi Kobayashi, one of the composers, noted the challenges and the excitement of working on the X68000 platform. The development team also integrated a secret option for enabling General MIDI, which was not officially advertised due to the variable sound quality across different devices. This choice underscored the developers' intention to experiment with and push the audio capabilities of the hardware, ensuring that each arrangement provided a unique listening experience that changed subtly with the selected sound module. These efforts culminated in a soundtrack that was not only memorable but also demonstrated the advanced audio design possible on the X68000 system.

Sōta Fujimori, staff composer for the Konami Corporation in Japan, performed all new arrangements of the soundtrack for Castlevania Chronicles' "Arrange Mode". In the Japanese Chronicles, unlike the US and European versions, the sound hardware selection screen automatically appears before starting a game on "Original Mode" just as it did in Castlevania (X68000). A code must be entered to reach it in either mode in the U.S. and European versions, while the Japanese version only requires one to be entered in "Arrange Mode". Audio-wise, the Japanese version of Chronicles had slowdown issues with the music playback. These were fixed for the U.S. and European releases.

== Reception ==
Reception

Aggregate score
Aggregator	Score
GameRankings	73.53% (18 reviews)

Review scores
Publication	Score
AllGame	3.5/5
Electronic Gaming Monthly	72
GamePro	80
GameSpot	6.1/10
IGN	7.8/10
Next Generation	3/5

Akumajō Dracula and its PlayStation remake Castlevania Chronicles received a mostly positive response from both players and critics upon their respective releases. Director Hideo Ueda remarked that feedback from players, which was collected through postcards, generally praised the game although some voiced concerns over its high difficulty level. This aspect of challenge was highlighted in reviews, with Electronic Gaming Monthly appreciating the "frustratingly good difficulty" that stayed true to the game's roots, alongside "cool extras" that maintained the original Castlevania appeal. Furthermore, major gaming publications like IGN lauded the game for its fun and adherence to the beloved traditional formula of the series, suggesting that it successfully captured the essence of the original game while introducing enough new elements to feel refreshing.

Not all feedback was uniformly positive. GameSpot criticized the PlayStation version for its perceived lack of replay value and dated graphics, assigning it a modest score of 6.1. This sentiment was somewhat echoed by GamePro in their otherwise favourable review, which noted that gamers unfamiliar with the franchise might find the platform-hopping mechanics outdated compared to more modern titles. Despite these criticisms, other reviewers like James Stevenson from Cinescape found the retro design charming rather than detrimental, giving the game a B+ and appreciating its nostalgic value. PSX Nation's J.M Vargas assigned the game a score of 80% and concluded: "One tough mother through and through. It's a simpler, tighter, better-paced and more addictive old-school side-scroller adventure than 1997's Symphony of the Night." Scott Steinberg of Next Generation also commented positively, describing it as excellent content for Castlevania collectors and a commendable experiment in classic gaming for a broader audience, ultimately rating it three stars out of five.
