= Vampire Killer =

1986 video game

- European box art
- Developer: Konami
- Publisher: Konami
- Producer: Akihiko Nagata
- Designer: Akihiko Nagata
- Programmers: A. Harima; Isao Akada; Katsuya Nagae
- Artist: F. Hayakawa
- Composers: Kinuyo Yamashita; Satoe Terashima
- Series: Castlevania
- Platform: MSX2
- Release: JP: October 30, 1986; EU: 1987
- Genres: Platform, action-adventure
- Mode: Single-player

Vampire Killer, known in Japan as Akumajō Dracula, (Note: Japanese: 悪魔城ドラキュラ, Hepburn: Akumajō Dorakyura; lit. "Demon Castle Dracula") is a 1986 platform game developed and published by Konami for the MSX2. It is a parallel version of the original Castlevania, which debuted a month earlier for the Famicom Disk System under the same Japanese title. However, the MSX2 version was localized first in Europe and was published without the Castlevania branding that the franchise would start using abroad in 1987 when the NES version was released in North America (where neither Vampire Killer nor the MSX2 platform were released). It was released on the Project EGG website on July 22, 2014, and Wii U's Virtual Console on December 17, 2014, in Japan.

Like in Castlevania, the player controls vampire hunter Simon Belmont, who ventures into Dracula's castle armed with a mystical whip inherited from his father, in order to slay the evil count.

== Gameplay ==
While Vampire Killer shares the same premise, background music, characters and locations as the original Castlevania, the structure of the game and its play mechanics differ significantly from its NES counterpart. Like Castlevania, Vampire Killer consists of 18 stages, with a boss encounter at the end of every third stage. But in contrast to the linear level designs in Castlevania, Vampire Killer features more labyrinth-like stages, requiring the player to seek out the exit to the next stage and find the skeleton key required to unlock it. Due to the hardware limitations of the MSX2, Vampire Killer uses flip screens instead of scrolling. The game can be played with a keyboard or a game controller.

Items and weapons can be obtained by breaking through candle stands and certain walls like in the NES version, and by purchasing them from merchants hidden throughout the castle or by unlocking treasure chests using keys. Simon's default whip can be replaced with one of four weapons: a chain whip, throwing daggers, a battle ax, and a battle cross - the latter two function both like a boomerang and must be retrieved on their return path if the player wishes to preserve them.

There are four items that Simon can carry with him similar to the sub-weapons in the NES version: a map which shows his current position and the location of the exit (can only be used three times), holy water, an hourglass (which temporarily paralyzes all enemies) and one of two types of shields. Heart points are used as ammunition for the holy water and hourglass and as currency for merchants.

There are other items that provide passive effects such as increasing or decreasing Simon's intelligence (which affects the prices of items sold by merchants), temporary invulnerability, increased speed, higher jumps, and health recovery. After defeating a boss, Simon will start the next stage without any of his previously accumulated equipment, aside from the number of hearts and the map.

The player starts the game with three lives and with no way to gain extra lives. There are no continues, unless the game is played with the Game Master cartridge in the second slot. Playing with the Game Master enables the option to select the stage and the number of lives to start with, as well as the ability to skip screens.

== Reception ==
Time Extension placed Vampire Killer fourth last on its list of ranked Castlevania games. It was described that it "is a rather unusual attempt to expand the original game in new and interesting ways, and proves that right from the beginning, Konami was clearly aware that Castlevania was a franchise which could easily evolve beyond its action-platforming origins. The problem is that this attempt to create a sort of action-RPG hybrid is badly undone by its non-linear structure (which involves searching looping levels in order to find keys) and the MSX2's infamous inability to handle smooth scrolling – screens 'flip' from one to the other when you reach the edge of a room. It's an interesting historical footnote, but beyond that, Vampire Killer isn't worth the eye-watering price the original version now changes hands for."
