= Castlevania (1986 video game) =

1986 video game

- North American NES box art
- Developer: Konami
- Publishers: Konami; Nintendo (arcade, GBA)
- Director: Hitoshi Akamatsu
- Composers: Kinuyo Yamashita; Satoe Terashima
- Series: Castlevania
- Platforms: Famicom Disk System, NES, arcade, Commodore 64, Amiga, MS-DOS, mobile phone, Game Boy Advance, Windows, Android, iOS
- Release: September 26, 1986: Famicom Disk System; JP: September 26, 1986 NES; NA: April 30, 1987; PAL: November 1988; JP: February 5, 1993 Arcade; NA: April 1987 C64; NA: 1990; PAL: 1990 Amiga, MS-DOS; NA: 1990 Mobile; JP: 2002; NA: July 7, 2004; PAL: 2004 Game Boy Advance; JP: August 10, 2004; NA: October 25, 2004; PAL: January 7, 2005; AU: November 24, 2005 Android, iOS; September 24, 2026 (Note: Delisted from stores on October 24, 2026)
- Genre: Platform
- Mode: Single-player
- Arcade system: PlayChoice-10, Nintendo VS. System

Castlevania, known in Japan as Akumajō Dracula, (Note: Japanese: 悪魔城ドラキュラ, Hepburn: Akumajō Dorakyura; lit. "Demon Castle Dracula") is a 1986 platform game developed and published by Konami. It was originally released in Japan for the Famicom Disk System in September 1986, before being ported to cartridge format and released in North America for the Nintendo Entertainment System (NES) in 1987 and in Europe in 1988. It was also re-issued for the Family Computer in cartridge format in 1993. It is the first installment in the Castlevania series.

Players control Simon Belmont, descendant of a legendary vampire hunter, who enters the castle of Count Dracula to destroy him when he suddenly reappears 100 years after Simon's ancestor vanquished him. Castlevania was developed in tandem with Konami's MSX2 game Vampire Killer, which was released a month later and uses the same premise, characters and settings, but features different gameplay mechanics. It was followed by a sequel, Castlevania II: Simon's Quest, and a prequel, Castlevania III: Dracula's Curse, both of which were also released for the NES. Super Castlevania IV was released in 1991 for the Super NES and follows the same story. A remake for the X68000 was released in 1993, and was later re-released for the PlayStation as Castlevania Chronicles in 2001.

Castlevania was a commercial success and received critical acclaim, with journalists praising its graphics, gameplay, music, and difficulty. It has since been considered one of the greatest video games ever made.

== Gameplay ==
The top of the screen displays the player's current score, time remaining, stage, health, current sub-weapon and sub-weapon ammo, as well as how much health the boss has. Here, the player character, Simon, is whipping an enemy.

Castlevania utilizes platform gameplay and is divided into six blocks of three stages each, for a total of 18 stages. Simon can move, jump, crouch, climb stairs and use a magic whip (known in the series as the "Vampire Killer") as his primary combat weapon. When the player presses the button to crack the whip, there is a short delay before Simon actually does so. The player begins the game with four lives and five hearts, and must complete the current block of stages before a timer runs out. Simon has a health meter, which decreases whenever he is hit by an enemy or projectile. One life is lost if either the meter or the timer reaches zero, if Simon falls off the bottom of the screen, or is hit by a moving spiked ceiling. Hidden food items restore health, and bonus lives are earned at certain score thresholds. The player fights a boss character, usually themed after a classic horror movie monster such as Frankenstein's monster or the Grim Reaper, at the end of each block. Simon must win the battle and pick up a red orb that restores all health before time runs out in order to advance. The ultimate goal is to defeat Count Dracula himself and the Curse of Man at the end of Stage 18, triggering the collapse of Dracula's castle and allowing the player to restart the game at an increased difficulty.

Throughout the game, the player can find and use various backup weapons, including throwing knives, axes, vials of holy water that act as fiery grenades, a magical watch that can briefly freeze enemies, and sacred crosses that function as boomerangs. However, only one such weapon can be carried at a time; if the player picks up a new one or loses a life, the weapon is automatically lost. Backup weapons require hearts for their use, which can be found by extinguishing candles or defeating enemies with the whip. Other hidden items include point bonuses (money bags, crowns, chests), temporary invincibility (golden jar), upgrades to the whip's length and power (metal chain), instant destruction of all on-screen enemies (blue rosary), and double or triple use of any backup weapon except the watch.

When all lives are lost, the player has the option to continue from the start of the block or return to the title screen.

== Development ==
Castlevania was conceived and directed by Konami developer Hitoshi Akamatsu. Previously having programmed arcade game Finalizer (1985), Castlevania was one of his earliest works after his transition from the arcade division to the console department. According to Sonna Yummi, his former co-worker, Akamatsu was a movie buff and wanted to make players feel like they were playing through a classic horror film. Wireframe's Jack Yarwood speculated this is related to the game's use of movie villains as enemies, including the Mummy, Medusa, and Dracula. Raiders of the Lost Ark was also one of his favorite films, which influenced the whip as Simon's weapon of choice.

Yummi said Akamatsu's understanding of game design affected Castlevania's gameplay. For example, Akamatsu purposefully determined the order in which the subweapons would appear. The knife was the first one to appear so that the player could get used to the subweapons. The stopwatch was added for the player to learn enemy attacks. The strongest items like the cross and the holy water were the last to appear. The fight with Death was made intentionally difficult in order to make players understand how to use the cross and axe subweapons.

Numerous elements in the initial design documents were changed or removed throughout the development. Simon Belmont was originally named Peter Dante, a grandson of Christopher Dante. Several planned subweapons, such as garlic, a gun with silver bullets, and an item that transforms the player character into a werewolf, were cut in the final version. Whip attacks were meant to be available in three different directions before they were simplified. The idea was revisited in Super Castlevania IV.

The soundtrack was composed by Kinuyo Yamashita and Satoe Terashima. Yamashita said she did almost all of the composition, creating the music data and serving as a sound engineer at the same time. Castlevania was Yamashita's first work after joining Konami. Her goal was to create music suitable for the dynamics of the player and the game's gothic image.

== Release ==
Castlevania was originally released for the Family Computer Disk System in 1986. Due to its success in Japan, it was released in cartridge format for the Nintendo Entertainment System (NES) under the title of Castlevania in 1987 in North America and 1988 in Europe, and re-released in cartridge format for the Japanese Famicom under its original title in 1993. The international name of Castlevania was the result of Konami of America senior vice president Emil Heidkamp's discomfort with the religious connotations of the title Akumajō Dracula, which he believed translated as "Dracula Satanic Castle". Castlevania was one of the first major platform games on the NES and a part of an unofficial second wave of video games for the NES. Its release coincided with the 90th anniversary of Bram Stoker's Dracula. An arcade version based on the NES version for the Nintendo VS. System, titled VS. Castlevania, was released in April 1987 by Nintendo. This version was released by Hamster Corporation as part of their Arcade Archives series for the Nintendo Switch and PlayStation 4 on October 17, 2019.

A game also titled Akumajō Dracula was developed for the MSX2 simultaneously. It was released a month after the Disk System game. It was released in Europe under the title Vampire Killer where it was the first game in the series to be released. The MSX2 version featured different areas and new gameplay.

=== Versions and re-releases ===
Castlevania has been ported to a variety of different video game consoles, handheld game consoles, home computer systems, and mobile phones.

A ROM cartridge version of the game was released for the Japanese Family Computer in 1993. The release omitted the name registration screen from the original Famicom Disk version (as well as saving) and included an "Easy" mode.

In 2002, Konami released the first three NES Castlevania games for Windows as Konami Collector's Series: Castlevania & Contra.

In 2004, Castlevania was released for the Game Boy Advance as part of the Classic NES Series by Nintendo. The original end credits of the game, which consisted of puns on the names of horror movie stars, were removed in this version.

The original game was included as one of 30 games featured on the 2016 NES Classic Edition.

The game is included in Castlevania Anniversary Collection, a compilation released as part of Konami's 50th anniversary. In Japan, this compilation includes the 1993 Famicom port instead of the original version. This contrasts the Virtual Console which used the Famicom Disk System version in all of its Japanese rereleases.

On September 24, 2026, a version of the game for Android and iOS was made available for free for a limited time as part of the series' 40th anniversary celebration. The game was available for download until October 24, 2026, after which the players who downloaded the game before that are able to continue to play it.

== Reception and legacy ==
Reception

Aggregate scores
Aggregator	Score
GameRankings	VC: 69% GBA: 71%
Metacritic	GBA: 74/100

Review scores
Publication	Score
Computer and Video Games	NES: 80%
Famitsu	FDS: 8/10, 8/10, 9/10, 9/10 (Note: Each of the four reviewers in Famitsu scored the game on a ten point scale)
GameSpot	Wii VC: 7.1/10
Beep	FDS: 4/5

The game sold over 1 million units. It sold impressively and was considered a classic by Retro Gamer and IGN.

For the original Famicom Disk System release, a review in the Japanese magazine Beep complimented the graphics and controls while stating that Konami may have focused too much on graphics as they found the game to be relatively short. In the Japanese gaming publication Bi-Weekly Famitsu, two reviewers praised the game's graphics, with one saying that most of the data on the cartridge must be dedicated to the graphics. The other two reviewers complimented the game overall stating that it was a typically high quality work from Konami, with one praising the scale of the game due to it being for the Famicom Disc System. Among the negatives were that collecting points in the game seemed trivial as its not the goal of the game and the movement was a little monotonous. It was the highest rated game Famitsu reviewed in 1986.

Computer and Video Games gave it a positive review in 1989, praising the "huge playing area and lots of neat touches" that would "keep you engrossed for weeks." They criticized the "gaudy graphics" but said "it's the gameplay that counts, and it's great!"

It was rated the 22nd best game made on a Nintendo System in Nintendo Power's Top 200 Games list in 2006. In August 2008, Nintendo Power listed it as the 14th-best Nintendo Entertainment System video game. In 2001, Game Informer ranked it the 48th-best game ever made; the staff noted that its gameplay set a standard for the industry. IGN ranked it 19th on their list of the best NES games; the second and third Castlevania games were ranked 25th and fifth, respectively. It was praised for its difficulty, gameplay, soundtrack and visuals. GameZone ranked it as the eighth-best Castlevania game. Robert Workman (an editor for GameZone) felt that the game had aged well and was a great value on the Wii Virtual Console. IGN's Lucas M. Thomas noted the relative realism of Castlevania's weapons versus "glowing flowers that let you throw bouncing fireballs." He also praised it for feeling scary while also not taking itself too seriously. The combination of these elements and others caused him to credit it as a "unique and wonderful" game and a game that made an impact on later Castlevania titles. Retro Gamer called it one of the most enduring video games ever made. It attributed its quality less so to its unique gameplay and more so to the adult atmosphere and challenge for players. In his review of the Virtual Console version, IGN's Mark Birnbaum personally enjoyed its difficulty and design but noted that people who were quick to become frustrated would enjoy the Super NES sequel Super Castlevania IV better. 1UP.com's Kurt Kalata praised its level of difficulty and its realistic visual design.

Game Informer's Tim Turi claimed that the original Castlevania made the series a "legend" and called it the "essential Castlevania experience." IGN wrote a piece that discussed the idea that this game as well as other early Castlevania titles were overshadowed by the 1997 release Castlevania: Symphony of the Night, which it considered the best title in the series. The article cited this game's absence from IGN's top 100 games of all time as well as the absence of the second and third Castlevanias from Game Informer's 'top 100 games of all time' list. It suggested that the reason this is the case is because of the NES games' high learning curve and difficulty level. Reviewers also felt that Symphony of the Night's influence on the series after its release caused people to forget about the NES games. It praised the Virtual Console for allowing players unfamiliar with these games to experience them more easily. IGN's Lucas M. Thomas included its 25th anniversary in a list of forgotten anniversaries which took place in 2011. He felt it odd that Castlevania had so many titles before its 25th anniversary, yet only released one title during 2011.

The Classic NES Series re-release of the game was met with mixed to positive reception. It holds an average score of 74/100 and 71% at Metacritic and GameRankings, respectively.

Castlevania was cited as an influence on Ninja Gaiden (1988) for the Nintendo Entertainment System. Ninja Gaiden borrowed various gameplay elements from Castlevania, including power-up items that give special abilities.
