= Detana TwinBee Yahho! Deluxe Pack =

- Developer: Konami
- Publisher: Konami
- Series: TwinBee
- Platforms: PlayStation, Sega Saturn
- Release: JP: 29 September 1995
- Genre: Various
- Modes: Single-player, multiplayer

Detana TwinBee Yahho! Deluxe Pack (Note: Japanese: 出たなツインビーヤッホー！ＤＥＬＵＸＥ ＰＡＣＫ, Hepburn: Detana TsuinBī Yahho! Deluxe Pack; lit. "Here Comes TwinBee Yahho! Deluxe Pack") is a 1995 two-in-one video game compilation developed and published by Konami for the PlayStation and Sega Saturn. It is the second Deluxe Pack release following Gokujō Parodius Da! Deluxe Pack, which included both Parodius Da! (1990) and Gokujo Parodius (1994). Part of the TwinBee series, it includes the original arcade versions of both Detana!! TwinBee and TwinBee Yahho!. In both games, players assume the role of Light and Pastel taking control of TwinBee and WinBee to defeat invading forces of the evil alien Iva and Archduke Nonsense to save planet Meru and the Land of Wonders island after receiving an SOS message sent by princess Melora and Queen Melody.

Detana TwinBee Yahho! Deluxe Pack was met with mixed reception from critics, most of which reviewed it as a import title, since its release on PlayStation and Saturn. Reviewers praised the inclusion of both Detana!! and Yahho!, in addition of being faithful conversion of the arcade originals but most felt mixed in regards to certain aspects. Both the PlayStation and Saturn versions sold approximately 156,549 copies combined during their lifespan in Japan.

== Games ==
The menu interface in Detana TwinBee Yahho! Deluxe Pack

Detana TwinBee Yahho! Deluxe Pack is a compilation of two vertical-scrolling shooter games previously released in the TwinBee franchise by Konami: Detana!! TwinBee and TwinBee Yahho!. In Detana!!, players assume the role of Light and Pastel taking control of TwinBee and WinBee to defeat invading forces of the evil alien Iva and save planet Meru after receiving an SOS message sent by princess Melora. Detana!! follows the same conventions established in the original TwinBee, but the controls use the Japanese configuration; one button is used to fire the gun at airborne enemies while the other is used to drop bombs to the ground. Power-up items consist of bells which can be uncovered by shooting the floating clouds, as well as items uncovered by destroying land enemies. As with TwinBee, players can shoot the floating bells to change between five different colors but two new color bells are introduced in Detana!! (purple and black). Both the PlayStation and Sega Saturn versions of Detana!! lack support for vertical (TATE) display.

In Yahho!, players reassume the roles of Light and Pastel piloting TwinBee and WinBee to defeat the invading forces of Archduke Nonsense, who seeks the Harp of Happiness to conquer the world, and free the Land of Wonders island after receiving an SOS message by Flute, a fairy who serves Queen Melody. Yahho! differs from Detana!! in that the gameplay is much faster and players can adjust their playing style before starting the game to suit their preference. Players begin by choosing between three difficulty settings: Practice, Normal and Special. Players can also select between four different "charged shots" types and two control styles. The PlayStation and Saturn versions of Yahho! introduces additional voice acting.

== Development and release ==
Detana TwinBee Yahho! Deluxe Pack was developed by Konami.

Detana TwinBee Yahho! Deluxe Pack was first released by Konami for both the PlayStation and Sega Saturn on September 29, 1995. The PlayStation version was re-released twice as a budget title; first in 1997 under the "PlayStation the Best for Family" line and later in 2003 under the "PS one Books" line.

== Release and reception ==
Reception

Review scores
Publication	Score
GameFan	(PS/SS) 238/300
Joypad	(PS) 82%
M! Games	(PS/SS) 70%
Play	(PS) 65%
Super Game Power	(PS) 3.8/5
Dengeki PlayStation	(PS) 80/100, 70/100, 65/100, 60/100
Fun Generation	(PS/SS) 5/10
Mega Force	(SS) 85%
PlayStation Plus	(PS) 55/100
Sega Saturn Magazine	(SS) 7.33/10

Detana TwinBee Yahho! Deluxe Pack was met with mixed reception from critics since its release on PlayStation and Sega Saturn, while the fan reception was positive; readers of the Japanese Sega Saturn Magazine voted to give the Saturn version a 7.4458 out of 10 score, ranking at the number 536 spot, indicating a popular following. According to Famitsu, the PlayStation and Saturn versions sold over 60,119 and 55,137 copies in their first week on the market respectively. Both the PlayStation and Saturn versions sold approximately 156,549 copies combined during their lifetime in Japan.

GameFan's three reviewers praised both the PlayStation and Sega Saturn versions for the inclusion of TwinBee Yahho! and its visual effects but criticized the short length of Yahho! and slow pacing of Detana!! TwinBee, while Casey Loe in particular recommended playing Pop'n TwinBee on Super Famicom instead. Joypad's Olivier Prézeau commended the PlayStation version for the inclusion of both games, praising the compilation for being faithful to the original versions of both games but criticized the addition of unlimited continues, which hampered the replay value and overall originality. Likewise, Play gave the PlayStation release a positive remark but criticized it for its short length. Martin Weidner and Stefan Hellert of German magazine Fun Generation also reviewed both the PlayStation and Saturn releases but gave it a very mixed outlook. In contrast, Laurent of French publication Mega Force reviewed the Saturn release and praised the compilation for its audiovisual presentation, animations and controls. He also commended the humor on-display while retaining aspects of a shooter game such as difficulty, action and weapon variety.
