= Wai Wai World 2: SOS!! Parsley Jō =

1991 video game

- Developer: Konami
- Publisher: Konami
- Programmers: Kazuhiro Aoyama; Mitsuaki Ogawa; Makoto Yamaguchi; Koji Yoshida
- Artists: Keita Kawaminami; Kazumichi Ishihara; Hirotaka Fukuda
- Composers: Yūichi Sakakura; Kenichi Matsubara; Satoko Minami
- Series: Konami Wai Wai World
- Platforms: Famicom, Virtual Console
- Release: JP: January 5, 1991; JP: September 2, 2015 (Wii U)
- Genre: Platform
- Modes: Single-player, multiplayer

Wai Wai World 2: SOS!! Parsley Jō (Note: ワイワイワールド2 SOS!!パセリ城, Wai Wai Wārudo Tsū Esuōesu!! Paseri Jō; lit. "Wai Wai World 2: SOS!! Parsley Castle) is a 1991 platform game released by Konami for the Famicom only in Japan. It is a sequel to Konami Wai Wai World, and stars various Konami characters.

== Gameplay ==
The player begins the game by choosing one of four character groups which consist of three different Konami characters. Most of the levels are spoofs of various different levels from Konami games. The gameplay is mostly like a straightforward platform game, similar to Contra.

In these levels, the player starts off with the main character Rickle (or Rikkuru), who by collecting a special power-up, can transform temporarily into one of the three different characters the player chose at the beginning of the game. There are also space shooter, driving, and puzzle levels. After certain levels the player can choose different paths which consist of different stages.

== Plot ==
Peaceful times were reigning in Wai Wai World, when suddenly a great wizard by the name of Warūmon emerged from the darkness and swiftly conquered the land. In response, Dr. Cinnamon, who escaped the attack for being away on a sightseeing trip, created a super robot named "Rickle" by using his secretly developed "Konami Hero Transformation Circuit" and sent him forth to defeat Warūmon.

When Warūmon learned of Cinnamon's plan, he kidnapped Wai Wai World's Herb Princess and took her away to his base in outer space, known as "Parsley Castle". There, he revived villains that had been previously defeated by former Konami heroes and sent them over to stop Rickle.

=== Characters ===
- Rickle (リックル, Rikkuru): The game's main protagonist, who is also a robot created by Dr. Cinnamon.
- Goemon: This ninja from the Ganbare Goemon series returns from Wai Wai World. He throws his pipe like a boomerang which is used as a weapon.
- Simon Belmont III: The Vampire Killer from the Castlevania series returns from the first Wai Wai World game, armed with his whip.
- Getsu Fūma: He is from the Famicom game released only in Japan, Getsu Fūma Den armed with a sword. He also returns from Wai Wai World.
- Upa: The baby hero who uses a rattle as a weapon from Bio Miracle Bokutte Upa. He also returns from the mobile phone versions of Wai Wai World.
- Bill Rizer: The Rambo-style hero from the Contra series. He uses his spreader gun that can shoot in multiple directions.
- Vic Viper: The spaceship from the Gradius series who the player can only use for the Gradius shooter stages.
- Twinbee: From the TwinBee series, who the player can only use in the Twinbee shooter stages.
- Dr. Cinnamon: Scientist from the TwinBee series, helps the characters throughout the game.
- Pentarou: Penguin from the Parodius series.

== Ports ==
The game was also re-released for the Wii U Virtual Console on September 2, 2015 in Japan.

== See also ==
- Konami Wai Wai World: the previous game.
- Parodius series: a crossover game series that parodies Gradius.
- Hai no Majutsushi: a 1989 Mahjong game for MSX2 featuring eight Konami mascots.
- Jikkyō Power Pro Wrestling '96: Max Voltage: a 1996 wrestling video game for Super Famicom.
- Speed King NEO KOBE 2045: the 1996 futuristic racing video game for PlayStation where nearly all the machines are named after classic Konami games.
- Konami Krazy Racers: a 2001 racing game starring some of the Wai Wai World cast for the Game Boy Advance.
- Konami Wai Wai Sokoban: a 2006 puzzle game for mobile phones.
- Otomedius

== Bibliography ==
- Kalata, Kurt (2017). Hardcore Gaming 101 Presents: Contra and Other Konami Classics. ISBN 978-1546928034.
