= Konami Wai Wai World =

1988 video game

- Developer: Konami
- Publisher: Konami
- Composers: Shinya Sakamoto; Shigemasa Matsuo; Atsushi Fujio
- Series: Konami Wai Wai World
- Platforms: Family Computer, mobile phone
- Release: Family Computer: JP: January 14, 1988; Mobile phones; JP: April 5, 2006
- Genre: Platform
- Modes: Single-player, multiplayer

Konami Wai Wai World (Note: Japanese: コナミワイワイワールド, Hepburn: Konami Wai Wai Wārudo) is a 1988 platformer video game developed and published by Konami for the Family Computer. Released only in Japan, the name, "wai wai" is a Japanese onomatopoeia expressing a noisy or boisterous atmosphere. The game starred a variety of characters pulled from other Konami games and franchises of the time. A sequel, Wai Wai World 2: SOS!! Parsley Jō, was released for the Famicom in 1991.

== Gameplay ==
The player starts the game as Konami Man and can switch between Konami Man and Konami Lady. If two players are gaming, then one will play as Konami Man and the other as Konami Lady. Both players are not able to switch characters until they rescue at least one character from one of the six levels. The player must play through six different selectable levels that take place in different Konami games. Subsequently, the player uses a key to save that game's star character, who then becomes playable. Each character has different abilities to begin with as well as ones they can eventually gain. The player ventures through these first six levels in a sort of nonlinear fashion with gameplay very similar to the original Castlevania games. After these stages are completed, the player plays through a scrolling space shooter stage and then a linear final stage.

The player can regularly visit the lab of Dr. Cinnamon (from the TwinBee series), who gives the player the game's character profiles and refills energy when needed. Through his lab, the player can talk to Saimon, Dr. Cinnamon's brother, who can resurrect any defeated characters at the cost of 100 bullets per character during the game.

=== Playable characters ===
The following are playable characters:

- Konami Man: The game's main protagonist who only made cameos in Konami games before this game.
- Konami Lady: A female android created by Dr. Cinnamon to fight with Konami Man.
- Goemon: A ninja from the Ganbare Goemon series is found in the Medieval Japan level.
- Simon Belmont III: The descendant of the Vampire Killer from the Castlevania series is found in the Castle level.
- Getsu Fūma: He is from the Famicom game released only in Japan, Getsu Fūma Den. He is found in the Underworld (or Hell) level.
- Michael "Mikey" Walsh: The lead character in The Goonies film and the Famicom games, The Goonies (sold in retail only in Japan) and The Goonies II; he is found in the Cave level.
- Moai Alexandria: Numerous Moai are usually enemies in the Gradius series and a playable character in Moai-kun; he is found in the Easter Island Temple.
- King Kong: From the Japan-only Famicom game King Kong 2: Ikari no Megaton Punch which is based on the film King Kong Lives (King Kong 2 in Japan). He is found in the City level.
- Upa: The baby protagonist from Bio Miracle Bokutte Upa who only appears in the mobile phone version as a replacement for Mikey due to lost licensing rights in the 2000s. He is found in the Candy level.
- Penta: The main protagonist from Antarctic Adventure and a father of Pentarou who only appears in the mobile phone version as a replacement for King Kong due to lost licensing rights in the 2000s. He is found in the Antarctic level.
- Vic Viper: The spaceship from the Gradius series. The player can only play this ship in the shooter stage.
- TwinBee: From the TwinBee series. Like the Vic Viper, the player can only play this ship in the shooter stage.

=== Other characters ===
- Dr. Cinnamon: Scientist from the TwinBee series, helps the characters throughout the game.
- Saimon: Dr. Cinnamon's brother who brings defeated characters back to life.
- Pentarou: Penguin from the Parodius series (the son of Penta, who originally appeared in Antarctic Adventure), transports the player to one of the six main levels.
- Hanako: Penguin from the Parodius series, replacing Pentarou (in the mobile phone version).

== Music ==
The music during gameplay depends on which character the player is playing as. Each character has their own music, which serves as their theme song. Besides Konami Man, Konami Girl and Moai, all the other characters use music from the Konami games they starred in. The different boss music in the game is also taken from Konami games in which the level is based. Wai Wai World 1&2 Sound Collection (Note: WAI WAI WORLD 1&2 SOUND COLLECTION (ワイワイワールド1＆2 サウンドコレクション, Wai Wai Wārudo 1&2 Saundo Korekushon)) was released on a soundtrack CD on May 19, 2014 in Japan and was published by Eg Music Records and D4 Enterprise.

== Mobile phone version ==
The mobile phone version of Wai Wai World omits Mikey and King Kong due to licensing issues. They are replaced with Upa (from Bio Miracle Bokutte Upa) and a giant Penta (the protagonist from Antarctic Adventure, and father of Pentarou), with their respective stages being a Candy stage and an Antarctic stage.

== Bibliography ==
- Kalata, Kurt (2017). Hardcore Gaming 101 Presents: Contra and Other Konami Classics. ISBN 978-1546928034.
