= Jikkyō Oshaberi Parodius =

1995 video game

- Super Famicom box art
- Developer: Konami
- Publisher: Konami
- Series: Parodius
- Platforms: Super Famicom, Sega Saturn, PlayStation
- Release: Super Famicom: JP: December 15, 1995; Sega Saturn: JP: December 13, 1996; PlayStation: JP: December 20, 1996
- Genre: Horizontal scrolling shooter
- Modes: Single-player, multiplayer

Jikkyō Oshaberi Parodius (Note: Japanese: 実況(じっきょう)おしゃべりパロディウス, Hepburn: Jikkyō Oshaberi Parodiusu; lit. 'Chatting Parodius Live'. Referred to as Parodius 3 in some video game publications outside of Japan.) is a 1995 horizontal-scrolling shooter game developed and published by Konami for the Super Famicom. It is part of the Parodius series, a series of games that parody various shooter games and Japanese culture. Jikkyō Oshaberi Parodius features further parodies of other titles developed by Konami and also features a running commentary from Japanese voice actor Jōji Yanami.

The game is about various characters seeking out a legendary takoyaki that is only made once every 128 years. The player controls the character moving through scrolling levels shooting at various enemy squadrons that get in their way. The game was later ported to the Sega Saturn and PlayStation with various added features.

The original game received positive reviews in Famicom Tsūshin, Total! and Super Play. Japanese publications often complimented on the narrative commentary as being very funny, while the gameplay was considered to be strong by some publications, others wrote the game was lacking in innovation or that the originality of the series had begun to grow stale.

== Background and plot ==
Jikkyō Oshaberi Parodius is the fourth game in the Parodius series and was developed by Konami. The company previously developed the franchise Gradius which spawned various sequels. A spin-off of the series was Parodius (1988) which heavily parodied Gradius and Japanese culture. The series has been primarily aimed at the Japanese video game market, and is known for its bizarre visuals and quirky themes.

The games plot is set in 1996, when Mr. Parodius, the octopus from Parodius (1990) called upon his eldest son, Takosuke, the protagonist of Gokujō Parodius (1994) and asks him to get him the legendary takoyaki that is only made once every 128 years. This leads to him calling upon the second of the four octopus brothers, Takohiko, and tells him that their father asked him to do this quest. As Takohiko goes to seek the food, Takosuke feels fine with this request as he says he has other brothers in case anything happens to Takohiko. Takohiko is one of the many characters who either seeks the takoyaki or follows another character who seeks it.

== Gameplay ==
Gameplay of a disco-themed level in the Super Famicom version of Jikkyō Oshaberi Parodius. The player controls the character on the left, while the item bar appears at the bottom of the screen.

Jikkyō Oshaberi Parodius is a horizontally scrolling shooter game. The player can move their character in eight directions across the screen. They pilot their character through a variety of two-dimensional levels avoiding obstructions. They use buttons that are assigned to shoot missiles and selecting and use power-ups. On screen, the player can collect power ups via capsules and bells. The player can select which character to play as beyond Takohiko, who all have various forms of attacking patterns and abilities. Depending on the characters chosen and power-ups collected, they can fire and attack enemies from various and multiple angles.

The player can adjust how many lives they start with, the games difficulty setting before playing. The player starts with a select amount of credits. On failing a level, they are taken to a continue screen where they can quit or try again if they have any remaining credits. The game ends when the amount of credits runs out. The player can collect items from defeating specific enemies or certain squadron of enemies. These include power-ups that allow you to fill up your power gauge. When the gauge lights up, the players character will have more firepower options to defeat enemies easier. Some of these enemies and squadrons also drop bells, which come in a variety of colors and can be changed by hitting them with a missile shot. Each bell produces a unique effect, such as having consecutive shots increase your points, or allowing the player's character to have a megaphone to defeat enemies, or temporary invulnerability.

== Background and development ==
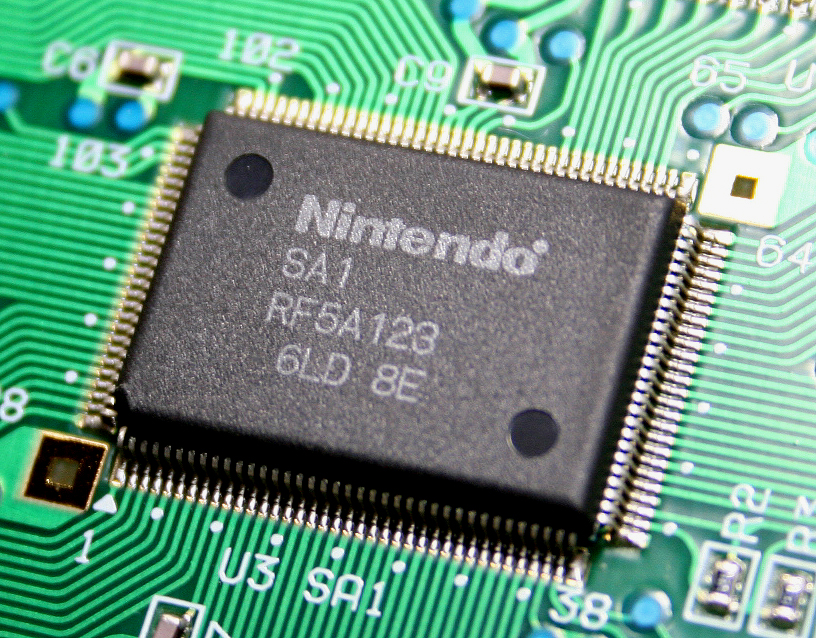
The Jikkyō Oshaberi Parodius cartridge included the SA-1 chip to allow for the game to have recorded voice samples.

Sakurai, the game planner of the three console versions of the game said that Jikkyō Oshaberi Parodius was like a side-story in the Parodius series, and that it runs along the original game and wanted audiences to not think of it as just a copy of the original Parodius and for it to be completely different than the arcade game Sexy Parodius (1996). While previous games in the series parodied other shooter games, Jikkyō Oshaberi Parodius also featured parodies of other Konami games such as Ganbare Goemon, Tokimeki Memorial (1994), TwinBee (1985), and a fast-food themed level based on Xexex (1991). Some characters such as Goemon, and Michael the pig who appeared in previous Parodius games are replaced with characters with similar move set-ups of the missing characters.

On April 3, 1995, the home video game development division of Konami was transferred to the new companies: Konami Computer Entertainment Tokyo (KCE Tokyo) and Konami Computer Entertainment Osaka (KCE Osaka). KCE Osaka predominantly made games for Nintendo systems. Jikkyō Oshaberi Parodius was equipped with the Super Accelerator-1 (SA-1) chip, which enables the game to be capable of operating at three times the clock speed of the console itself and have it contain voice samples. Along with International Superstar Soccer (1994), the game was part of Konami's "Sound Response" series, which featured games with more recorded voice audio in their Super Famicom games. The game features a running commentary provided by voice actor Jōji Yanami. In the original Super Famicom version of the game, a special chip was included that allowed for humorous voice samples from Yanami, such as brief reactionary commentary in Japanese such as "Watch out!" and "That wasn't good", as well as pop culture references on defeating a boss, such as saying "Omae wa mou shindeiru" (lit. "You are already dead"), a famous quote from Fist of the North Star.

== Release and remakes ==
Jikkyō Oshaberi Parodius was released for the Super Famicom in Japan on December 15, 1995. Kurt Kalata of Hardcore Gaming 101 said that Jikkyou Oshaberi Parodius was released right at the time when the 16-bit era of video games was ending, leading for the game to be ported 32-bit systems. Sakuraisaid that the ports led the team to think about how we could make it different as there were fewer hardware restrictions.

The two ports were titled Jikkyō Oshaberi Parodius: Forever With Me (Note: 実況おしゃべりパロディウス ~forever with me~; lit. Chatting Parodius Live: Forever With Me), with the first being released in Japan for the Sega Saturn on December 13, 1996. This version adds new content, such as the ability for two players to play simultaneously and the ability to toss allies to attack enemies. In the version for the Sega Saturn, all of the bosses are based on Taisen Puzzle-dama characters. This version also features an "Extra" mode which alters the enemy formations. Jikkyou Oshaberi Parodius was re-released for the PlayStation in Japan on December 20, which also added the ability for two players to play at the same time. This version also has an additional "Accident" mode, where the player will be in stages featuring polygonal enemies. Other changes in the remakes include the music being entirely re-arranged, the addition of a second female announcer voiced by Noriko Ohara. In two-player mode, Noriko also provides commentary. The game features more fairies to find in the game and new characters to unlock when collecting them all, such as Kid Dracula.

Jikkyō Oshaberi Parodius: Forever With Me was included on the video game compilation Parodius Portable (Note: パロディウス ポータブル; lit. Portable Parodius) released in Japan on January 25, 2007 for the PlayStation Portable. The version included is based on the PlayStation release, and has further changes made to it, such as the removal of multi-player modes, adjustments for difficulty, and some changed music. This includes removing a track based on Fuji Television's theme music for coverage of Formula One racing and "That's The Way I Like It" by KC and the Sunshine Band which is replaced with a remix of the song "Brilliant 2 U" from Dance Dance Revolution.

== Reception ==
=== Super Famicom ===
Super Famicom reception

Review scores
Publication	Score
Famicom Tsūshin	8/10, 8/10, 8/10, 8/10
Fun Generation	8/10
Super Play	83%
Total!	87/100
Video Games	82%

A number of video game magazines complimented the original Super Famicom release of Jikkyō Oshaberi Parodius. Reviews ranged from publications Fun Generation and Super Play calling it the "definitive Parodius game" for the Super Famicom and "the best of an excellent series that almost single handedly kept scrolling shooters alive and blasting on the SNES. The reviewer in Super Play added that while the game was "as slick as ever" it had "nothing innovative" to the genre or series, and recommending it to newcomers to the series. A reviewer in the magazine Video Games said the game stuttered more than the previous title but was also a crazier game in general recommending it for fans while finding the original Parodius game to still be the best in the series.

Tim Weaver of Total! the game was gorgeous and colorful with sprites that have high attention to detail while the Fun Generation reviewers said it showed how set a standard ona 2D shooter should look. Hirokazu Hamamura of Famicom Tsūshin said that the screen was so flashy that it was hard to concentrate on shooting, while suggesting this was "the games style at this point."

Weaver said the music in the game was "generally brilliant." The four reviewers in Japanese magazine Famicom Tsūshin all complimented the voice lines, finding them funny, well timed for the action, and surprising in how much dialogue there was even when compared to CD-ROM games.

=== Ports ===
Jikkyō Oshaberi Parodius: Forever With Me reception

Review scores
Publication	Score	
Publication	PS	Saturn
Dengeki PlayStation	80/100, 75/100	
Famicom Tsūshin	6/10, 6/10, 6/10, 8/10	7/10, 8/10, 7/10, 7/10
Fun Generation		8/10
Maniac	79%	79%
Saturn Fan		5.4/10
Saturn Power		60%
Sega Saturn Magazine		8.0/10

Comparing the re-release of the game to the original Super Famicom game, one reviewer in Famicom Tsūshin said the game did not have the same impact as the first which was to be expected while a reviewer in Fun Generation said that the improvements in the new version were "rather marginal", while game remained as the crowning conclusion of the series.

General reception ranged from magazines like Fun Generation saying the game still remaining fun and Maniac saying it "lacked innovation while being a technically flawless update." A reviewer in Famicom Tsūshin said it would keep fans of pure-shooters content, reviewers in Saturn Power found the series and genre had overstayed its welcome, saying "this game is one for fans of the genre only and hardly anybody else." while a review in Saturn Fan said it was only for long-time Parodius or Konami fanatics.

In terms of gameplay, a reviewer in Sega Saturn Magazine and Famicom Tsūshin found the difficulty balance as being just right. Other reviewers commented on the lack of innovation in the game, with the Sega Saturn Magazine reviewer saying that boss battles have not been expanded upon at all in the series while the reviews in Saturn Fan and Famicom Tsūshin said the game was lacking freshness, with the latter publication's reviewer saying the game was still fun regardless. Another reviewer in Saturn Fun said it was unsatisfying to use the weaker characters and that they found little excitement in only dodging bullets from enemies.

A reviewer in Saturn Fan said that anything unoriginal in the gameplay was made up for with the audio commentary, abundance of characters and entertaining parodies, specifically highlighting the commentary as enhancing the game. Two reviewers in Famicom Tsūshin also complimented the narrator commentary saying it created a new level of excitement in the game and was hilarious. The second reviewer in Saturn Fan said that while the commentary was amusing, it was overwhelmed by the games background music, something that did not effect a game with similar abundance of dialogue Jikkyō Powerful Pro Baseball. While a reviewer in Sega Saturn Magazine found the parodies of Tokimeki Memorial and Lethal Enforcers being particularly funny, a reviewer in Saturn Fan said that as we were well into a series of Parodius games, the characters were beginning to feel worn out.

A Sega Saturn Magazine reviewer said the game ran well with no slowdown, noticeably flickering graphics or poor loading times. Reviwers in Saturn Power found the game lacking as it was 2D game, while one reviewer in Saturn Fan said the pastel tone of everything made it to enemies blend into the backgrounds too often.
