= Kid Dracula =

Kid Dracula may refer to:

- Kid Dracula (1990 video game), 1990 Famicom video game
- Kid Dracula (1993 video game), 1993 Game Boy video game
