= TwinBee Yahho! =

1995 video game

TwinBee Yahho!: Fushigi no Kuni de Ōabare!! ツインビーヤッホー! ふしぎの国で大あばれ!!
- Arcade flyer
- Developer: Konami
- Publisher: Konami
- Composers: Akihiro Juichiya; Kazuhiro Senoo; Naoki Maeda
- Series: TwinBee
- Platforms: Arcade, PlayStation, PlayStation Portable, Sega Saturn
- Release: Arcade: JP: April 1995; PlayStation, Saturn: JP: September 29, 1995; PlayStation Portable: JP: January 25, 2007
- Genre: Scrolling shooter
- Modes: Single-player, multiplayer

TwinBee Yahho!: Fushigi no Kuni de Ōabare!! (Note: TwinBee Yahho!: Fushigi no Kuni de Ōabare!! (ツインビーヤッホー! ふしぎの国で大あばれ!!, Tsuin Bī Yahho!: Fushigi no Kuni de Ōabare!!; lit. TwinBee Yoo-Hoo!: Uproar in Wonderland!!)) is a 1995 vertically scrolling shooter video game developed and published by Konami for arcades. It is the third and final game in the TwinBee series released for the arcades. During the same year as its arcade release, the game was released for the PlayStation and Sega Saturn in a two-in-one compilation with its predecessor, Detana!! TwinBee, titled Detana TwinBee Yahho! Deluxe Pack. It was later included in the PlayStation Portable compilation TwinBee Portable, released in 2007. Like most games in the TwinBee series, it was released exclusively in Japan. An international version was produced with the title Magical TwinBee, but was never released. Although the voices were still in Japanese with no English subtitles, the other text in the game was translated into English. There would not be another shoot'em up game until the release of Line GoGo! TwinBee for iPhone OS and Android on 2013 in Japan.

== Gameplay ==
Gameplay screenshot

TwinBee Yahho! differs from Detana!! TwinBee in that the player can adjust their playing style before starting the game to suit their preference. The player begins by choosing between three difficulty settings: Practice, Normal, and Special. Practice course is the game's easiest setting and lasts only three stages, whereas the Special course is the hardest setting and is recommended to expert players. The player will then select between four different "charged shots" (ため撃ち, tame uchi). The regular Charge Shot from Detana! TwinBee is selectable, along with a Charge Punch, a Charge Split (which will cause the player's ship to shoot duplicates of itself), and a Charge Explosion that fires at eight directions at the same time. The player will then choose between two control styles: one which fires the gun with one button and drops bombs with the second, while the other style shoots and drops bomb at the same time with a single button (either button can be used).

Like in previous Twinbee games, there are two kinds of power-ups: bell power-ups obtained from the sky and land power-ups that can be retrieved from destroy ground enemies. The bells can be changed to up to six colors this time (yellow, blue, white, green, red, and pink), each with a unique attribute. GwinBee returns as well as a power-up item, along with the "twin attacks" that can be performed with GwinBee or another player. Michael from the Parodius games also appears as a power-up.

== Plot ==
Faraway from Donburi Island (where TwinBee and his friends live) lies a fantastic island known as the Land of Wonders. Its ruler, Queen Melody, has been imprisoned by Archduke Nonsense, who seeks to use the Queen's Harp of Happiness to conquer the world. Flute, a fairy who serves Queen Melody, escapes during the coup d'état and goes to Donburi island requesting the help of TwinBee and WinBee. TwinBee Yahho! features fully voiced cut-scenes during the game performed by the cast of the TwinBee Paradise radio drama. Story elements from TwinBee Paradise, including names of TwinBee's and WinBee's respective pilots (Light and Pastel), were used for the first time in the games in this installment.

== Reception ==
In Japan, Game Machine listed TwinBee Yahho! on their June 1, 1995 issue as being the sixth most-successful arcade game of the month.
