= Jikkyō Power Pro Wrestling '96: Max Voltage =

1996 video game

Jikkyō Power Pro Wrestling '96 Max Voltage
- Cover art
- Developer(s): Diamond Head
- Publisher(s): Konami
- Platform(s): Super Famicom
- Release: JP: September 13, 1996
- Genre(s): Wrestling
- Mode(s): Single-player, multiplayer

Jikkyō Power Pro Wrestling '96: Max Voltage (実況パワープロレスリング'96 マックス ボルテージ, Jikkyō Pawā Puro Resuringu '96 Makksu Borutēji) is a 1996 pro wrestling video game by Konami, released exclusively in Japan for the Super Famicom.

== Summary ==
Even though it is only three minutes and thirteen seconds into the match, one of the wrestlers is performing a suplex on another wrestler.

There is a career mode called "Max Voltage" mode which allows the player to relive the career of a Japanese professional wrestler, from his training days to his twilight years. In career mode, players can choose their background (ranging from wrestling to bodybuilding and even karate) in order to gain his moveset. Each player belongs to a wrestling company, and they can be easily switched around in career mode. Losing a series of matches will result in a game over.

Four different leagues found in this game include: Super Japan Pro Wrestling (which has stereotypical wrestlers from a circa-1996 Japanese federation), BOM (which are supposed to be the basic hardcore-style wrestlers with over-the-top character designs), WWK (which is full of self-references to other Konami games), and REAL'S (which are composed of mixed martial artists and shoot fighters). The self-referenced Konami characters include Bill and Lance from Contra, Goemon from Ganbare Goemon, Getsu Fuuma from Getsu Fūma Den, Richter Belmont, the main character from Meikyuu Jiin Dababa, a Snatcher, and the protagonist from Battlantis. Moai Head, Blue Option, Pink Option, Vic Viper, and Lord British (all from Gradius/Salamander/Parodius), and even Sparkster make cameo appearances from other Konami video games.
