= Gokujō Parodius =

1994 video game

- Super Famicom cover art
- Developer: Konami
- Publisher: Konami
- Designer: Tsukasa Tokuda
- Programmers: Tsukasa Tokuda; Yasuyuki Moritome
- Artists: Shūjirō Hamakawa; Chiyoko Hanano; Taro Matsuishi; Rika Ishimaru; Natsumi Bouike
- Composers: Arcade; Seiichi Fukami; Satoko Miyawaki; Kazuhiro Senoo; Super Famicom; Hideto Inoue; Nobuyuki Akena
- Series: Parodius
- Platforms: Arcade, Super Famicom
- Release: Arcade: JP: April 1994 Super Famicom; JP: November 25, 1994
- Genre: Scrolling shooter
- Modes: Single-player, multiplayer
- Arcade system: Konami GX

Gokujō Parodius ～Kako no Eikō o Motomete～, (Note: Japanese: 極上パロディウス ～過去の栄光を求めて～, Hepburn: Gokujō Parodiusu ～Kako no Eikō o Motomete～; lit. "Fantastic Parodius – Pursue the Glory of the Past") translated as Gokujo Parodius – Pursuing the Past Glory and also known as Fantastic Journey, is a 1994 horizontally scrolling shooter arcade video game developed and published by Konami. It is the third entry in their Parodius series, itself a parody spin-off of their Gradius series.

== Plot ==
The player character, like the previous game, flies through various strange and absurd locations in order to grab a treasure and reclaim their former glory. They find the treasure in a dance hall, but it turns out to be an anthropomorphic bomb named "Mr. Past Glory", who apologizes about not being the treasure before blowing up the dance hall.

== Gameplay ==
Arcade screenshot, showing two players fighting the mini-boss of the second stage. To the bottom are the player's power meters, to the top are their score and life count.

Gokujō Parodius is a horizontally scrolling shooter, and a parody of the Gradius series of games. Players select one of eight playable characters to progress through the game with; these include: the Vic Viper, the starship from Gradius; TwinBee, the protagonist of his self-titled series; Pentarou, son of the penguin from Antarctic Adventure; Takosuke, a hat-wearing octopus and the son of Tako; Hikaru, a Playboy bunny girl riding a rocket; Mambo, a mute sunfish; Michael, a stern angel pig; and Koitsu, a stickman riding a paper airplane. Each of these characters feature their own unique set of weapons, all being modified after the standard Gradius weapons.

As in the Gradius games, players can unlock new weapons and abilities by collecting power capsules dropped by certain types of enemies, which will highlight an option on the player's "power meter" — collecting additional capsules will give the player access to more powerful weapons. Some enemies will also drop bells from the TwinBee series that can also yield other abilities; the player can select which ability they want by firing additional shots at the bells to change their color.

The game spans a total of seven stages, each gradually increasing in difficulty. These stages feature strange, often humorous themes to them, such as a UFO catcher machine, giant cookie-like castles, and Las Vegas-esc casino parlors. Stages also feature bosses at the end that must be defeated to progress, often paralleling those found throughout the Gradius series; one boss in particular pays tribute to the Big Core ship from the original Gradius, with its core being an enormous traffic light and firing road signs at the player. Some bosses and stage designs are also parodies of those in other shooters, such as R-Type, Xevious, Galaga and Thunder Force. The soundtrack consists of remixes of well-known classical music, as well as tracks from Gradius and other Konami games such as TwinBee.

== Development ==
Gokujō Parodius was created by programmer and planner Tsukasa Tokuda, alongside designer Shūjirō "Shuzilow.HA!" Hamakawa, sound designer Kazuhiro Senoo, and Konami Development Section 2 chief Masahiro Inoue. Hamakawa was previously a character designer in the animation industry, and had worked on both Detana!! TwinBee (1991) and Gaiapolis (1993). After completing work on Parodius Da, Tsukasa turned to producing games for the PC Engine and X68000 home consoles. He was eventually offered a chance to return to Konami's arcade division, to where he began thinking of ideas for what kind of game he wanted to make next; he worked almost exclusively on the Parodius series, and after noticing that employees were interested in a new game in the series, Tsukasa's boss requested that he work on another Parodius as an "anniversary" title, as a way to announce his return to the arcade industry. Tsukasa was also annoyed by the fact that arcades in Japan were mostly filled with fighting games, and felt that a new shooting game would help make it stick out.

One of the first things that the development team focused on was the character roster. Tsukasa originally planned to have the game's roster be made up of six characters; his boss suggested it should be increased to eight, as most fighting games at the time had large character rosters. Tsukasa wanted the character selection to have a focus on living creatures instead of generic ships or fighter craft. Mambo, the ocean sunfish, was based on the MSX2 game Space Manbow, while the rocket-riding bunny girl Hikaru was added to please otakus. The stern-eyed angel pig Michael was made after thinking of how to make a pig character appear cute. The stickman Koitsu was based on an idea that Tsukasa had, where he tried making several small character sprites that moved around in action poses; the paper airplane was added to give him something to fly on, as Tsukasa felt it was weird to have him pilot a ship or other mecha design. Hamakawa recalls having difficulty animating Koitsu due to his paper-thin character design. Koitsu's shield was also originally made of fire, before being abruptly changed to a giant condom. The team also experimented with modifying the characters themselves, such as giving them fewer Options or increasing the hitboxes of projectiles; the Vic Viper, for instance, originally would have a strong hatch shield that could withstand multiple bullets without breaking, but be instantly shattered by a single laser.

The difficulty of the game was said to be higher than previous Parodius games. The "YOU LOSE" game over message was added right before the project deadline to intentionally frustrate the player, a concept shared by fighting games. The "Semi-Auto" playmode was added to make players mostly unfamiliar with shooters able to play it more easily; Tsukasa had previously used this concept in the Super Famicom conversion of Gradius III. Hamakawa designed most of the in-game bosses; when designing the stage 4 boss "Crazy Core", he envisioned it to originally be a generic robot-like character with traffic lights, but after making further additions to its design made it what he called "absurd and unrecognizable". Eliza, the mermaid-like boss in the second stage, was created to attract salarymen to the game with her sex appeal; it is believed that she is also based on the Dobkeratops, the first stage boss from R-Type. Hamakawa claims his favorite boss to design was the pillow-like capsule boss from the fifth stage, nicknamed "mizumakura" during production; it was created to be easy for bad players, as it shoots out power capsules as its "attack". The stage 6 boss, a Geisha sporting bunny ears, is a homage to the biwa player enemy from Namco's Genpei Toma Den.

Senoo composed the soundtrack, being his first video game project. He wanted to give the soundtrack the feeling of an American variety show, in contrast to the Japanese-like compositions in Parodius Da!. The development team worked with the Japanese Society for Rights of Authors, Composers and Publishers (JASRAC) organization to select pieces of classical music they felt were suitable for the game. Senoo was also a major fan of the soundtrack for Gradius, and was largely inspired by a CD he had that featured remixes of well-known Gradius tracks. The game's subtitle, translating to Pursue the Glory of the Past, was chosen by Tsukasa to express his wish that the Japanese arcade game industry to go "back to its roots" instead of being filled with mostly fighters.

== Release ==
Gokujō Parodius was ported to the Super Famicom on November 25, 1994 in Japan. This version adds the characters Goemon/Ebisumaru from Ganbare Goemon, Dracula-Kun/Kid-D from Kid Dracula and Upa/Rupa from Bio Miracle Bokutte Upa, and an alternating two player mode. In addition, Hikaru and Akane have a Tailgun, Boomerang Shot from Thunder Cross, another shooter game by Konami, and a Shield instead of the Spread Bomb, the Carrot Shot and a force field (named "Star") that they get in the arcade version (as well as on the Deluxe Pack). Similarly, Mambo and Samba are given Homing Missiles, the Reflect Shot (which gives them two options when chosen), Grade Up and a Shield instead of the Bubble Missile, the Control Laser, Search Laser and a force-field (named "Barrier").

Gokujō Parodius was also ported along with Parodius Da! on Gokujō Parodius Da! Deluxe Pack for PlayStation in 1994 and Sega Saturn in 1995. This compilation was released in Japan and Europe. Konami cited a lack of interest from U.S. retailers as the reason why the compilation was not released in the U.S. It was released in Europe as Parodius, with Parodius Da! simply titled Parodius and Gokujō Parodius titled Fantastic Journey. In 2023, an English fan translation patch was released for the Super Famicom version.

== Reception ==
Reception

Review scores
Publication	Score
Famitsu	6/10, 7/10, 7/10, 7/10 (SFC); 32/40 (PS)
Mega Fun	83% (SNES)
Maximum	3/5 (SAT)

Gokujō Parodius was a commercial success, with Game Machine reporting that it was the fourth most-successful arcade game of June 1994. Edge magazine listed it as the fifth most-popular PCB arcade game.

German publication Maniac commended the game's variety in levels, character selection and humor, as well as its usage of classical music. They favorably compared it to the R-Type series for its gameplay, and recommended it for fans of the Gradius series. Mega Fun magazine praised the game's humor, "pleasing" visuals and gameplay, although they disliked its occasional slowdown and graphical flicker.

Famitsu commended Gokujō Parodius Da! Deluxe Pack's accurate portrayal of the arcade original, while also applauding its responsive controls and colorful visuals. GameFan recommended the compilation to Gradius and shooter fans for its gameplay, multiplayer mode and humor, expressing hope of it being released in North America. Maximum said that it is virtually identical to the arcade and PlayStation versions and has very pleasing gameplay, visuals, and music, but is outdated compared to contemporary Saturn games. They summarized, "Konami's first effort [at a Saturn game] has a lot to commend it, but when there are epics such as Panzer Dragoon stretching the shooting genre, it's clear that Parodius is not in the same league."

In a 2015 retrospective review of the Parodius series, Hardcore Gaming 101 commended Gokujō for its humor, multiplayer, soundtrack and interesting level designs. They also applauded the Super Famicom version's accurate portrayal of the original arcade game, liking its graphics, music and additional characters.
