= Mariko Kouda =

Japanese actress (born 1969)

- 國府田 マリ子
- Born: September 5, 1969 (age 56); Miyashiro, Saitama Prefecture, Japan
- Occupations: Actress; voice actress; singer; radio personality
- Years active: 1991–present
- Agent: Aoni Production
- Notable credits: Ghost Sweeper Mikami as Okinu; Marmalade Boy as Miki Koishikawa; Mamotte Shugogetten as Shaorin
- Height: 156.5 cm (5 ft 2 in)
- Website: happyhappyhappy.co.jp

Mariko Kouda (國府田 マリ子, Kōda Mariko; born September 5, 1969 in Miyashiro, Minami Saitama, Saitama Prefecture) is a Japanese actress, voice actress, J-pop singer and radio personality. She graduated from Kasukabe Kyōei High School and went on to major in Communications at Tamagawa University in Machida City, Tokyo, graduating in 1990. Kouda has had at least one song appear on the program Minna no Uta.

She was a member of the J-pop voice acting group, Drops, until they disbanded. They were most well known for singing the ending theme to the anime Doki Doki School Hours although they did perform a couple of concerts one of which was released on DVD.

She works for the talent management firm Aoni Production. Her most notable roles include Okinu from Ghost Sweeper Mikami, Miki Koishikawa from Marmalade Boy and Shaorin from Mamotte Shugogetten.

== Filmography ==
=== Television animation ===
- Anime World Fairytales (Gretel)
- Black Jack (Rei Asato)
- Bobobo-bo Bo-bobo (Ruby, Denbo)
- Chance Pop Session (Reika)
- CLAMP School Detectives (Miyuki)
- Crayon Shin-chan (Young Witch Marie)
- Detective Academy Q (Mitsuru Hōshō)
- Digimon Savers (Sayuri Daimon)
- Doraemon (Yukari Aozora, Maho, girl)
- Fortune Quest (Max)
- Ghost Sweeper Mikami (Okinu)
- Goldfish Warning! (Shuko)
- Gun X Sword (Vivian)
- HappinessCharge PreCure! (Queen Mirage)
- Haunted Junction (Hanako Hasegawa)
- Jibaku-kun (Kuinsheru)
- Kaginado (Nayuki Minase)
- Kamisama Kazoku (Fumiko Komori)
- Kanon (Nayuki Minase)
- Kemono Friends (Moose)
- Kyōryū Bōkenki Jura Tripper (Ojō)
- Mamotte Shugogetten (Shaorin)
- Marmalade Boy (Miki Koishikawa)
- Masamune-kun's Revenge (Momo)
- Meiken Lassie (Priscilla)
- Monster Farm (Holly)
- Nintama Rantarō (Yuki)
- Nyaruko: Crawling With Love (Luhy Distone)
- One Piece (Kaya)
- Panpaka Pants (Croli)
- Pokémon (Sakura)
- Princess Connect! Re:Dive (Misato)
- Psychic Squad (Yoshimi Akashi)
- Rosario + Vampire Capu2 (Mako Yakumaru)
- Shūkan Storyland (Nami)
- Smile PreCure! (Ikuyo Hoshizora)
- The Wonderful Galaxy of Oz (Dorothy)
- Tanoshii Willow Town (Annie)
- Ultraman Kids: 30,000,000 Light Years in Search of Mother (Nōji)
- Vampire Knight (Juri Kuran)
- Welcome to Demon School! Iruma-kun Season 3 (Vepar)
- Xenosaga (Febronia)

=== OVA ===
- Denshin Mamotte Shugo Getten! (Shaorin)
- Dirty Pair Flash (Yuri)
- Dragon Half (Lufa)
- Galaxy Fraulein Yuna (Shiori)
- Gall Force Revolution (Catty Nebulart)
- Gestalt (anime) (Suzu)
- Harukaze Sentai V Force (Natsuki Aoi)
- Hozuki's Coolheadedness (Toyotama-hime)
- Idol Project (Mimu Emiruton)
- Kanon (Nayuki Minase)
- Maps (Hoshimi Kimizuka)
- Miyuki-chan in Wonderland (Miyuki)
- Ryūki Denshō (Myū)
- Shonan Junai Gumi (Namiki Ibu)
- Special Drama Fantasian na Nichijō (Madoka)
- Spectral Force (Azerea)
- The Super Dimension Fortress Macross II: Lovers, Again (Amy)
- Tattoon Master (Nima)
- Tekkaman Blade II (Yumi Francois)
- Twinbee:Winpī no 1/8 Panic (Madoka)
- Twinbee Paradise (Madoka)
- Virgin Fleet (Ise Haruoshimi)

=== Theatrical animation ===
- A·LI·CE (Maria)
- Dragon Quest: Dai no Bōken (Gome)
- Ghost Sweeper Mikami (Okinu)
- Marmalade Boy (Miki Koishikawa)
- Spring and Chaos (Toshi)

=== Video games ===
- Aoi Namida (Mana Fujihara)
- BS Zelda no Densetsu: Inishie no Sekiban (Princess Zelda)
- Doki Doki Pretty League (Chiaki Nonohara)
- Dōkyūsei (Yui Sakuragi)
- Dragon Shadow Spell (Prinveil)
- Dragon Knight III (Marie)
- FIST (Masumi Dotsuki)
- Free Talk Studio ~Mari no Kimama na O-Shaberi~ (Mari Kousaka, Natsumi Kawai)
- Galaxy Fraulein Yuna series (Shiori)
- Granblue Fantasy (Gabriel)
- Hot Shots Golf (Nanako and Ayaka)
- Kanon (Nayuki Minase)
- Langrisser I & II (Liana, Lána)
- Makeruna! Makendō 2 (Madonna)
- Medarot NAVI (NAVI, Navi-Commun)
- Megami Paradise II (Lilith)
- Mitsumete Knight (Ann)
- Otome-teki Koi Kakumei★Rabu Rebo!! (Natsumi)
- Popful Mail (Mail (PC-Engine version))
- Project X Zone 2 (Dr. Chizuru Urashima)
- Puyo Puyo CD 2 (Trio the Banshee)
- Ryūki Denshō: Dragoon (Myū)
- Super Real Mahjongg P IV (Aina)
- Twinbee Paradise (Madoka)
- Twinbee RPG (Madoka)
- Xenosaga (Febronia)

=== Dubbing ===
- Barbie as the Princess and the Pauper (Serafina)
- Freaks and Geeks (Lindsay Weir)
- Jawbreaker (Marcie Fox)
- Stressed Eric (Maria Gonzalez, Various)

=== Live action ===
- Eat & Run (Marie)
- Looking For
- Setsunai
- Voice

=== Radio ===
- Banana Hōsōkyoku Young Radio Grand Prix
- Chikada Haruo no Lion Package Song
- Doyō no Yoru Desu: Uha Uha Daihōsō Anime Street
- Furumoto Shinnosuke no Parachute Yūgekitai
- Kobayashi Yutaka no Super Gang Nouveau
- Kouda Mariko no Come On Funky Lips!
- Kouda Mariko no Doki Doki On Air
- Kouda Mariko no Game Museum
- Kouda Mariko no GM (part of OBC's V-Station)
- Kouda Mariko no Nebusoku Radio: Yume ha Sora Iro
- Kouda Mariko no Taisetsu ni Oboerumono no ga Issho nara Ii yo ne
- Kore ga Sō na no ne, Koneko-chan
- MBS Radio Ore-tachi Yattemāsu Getsuyōbi
- Mō Sugu Ore-tachi xxx Yattemāsu
- Nazo Nazo Dreamin'
- Ore-tachi Yattemāsu
- Ore-tachi xxx Yattemāsu
- Ore-tachi xxx Yattemāsu Next
- Shao & Taisuke no Kon'ya mo Sugo Getten
- Tensai! Hayamimi Radio-kun: Kouda Mariko no Honjitsu mo Game Sanmai
- Twinbee Paradise
- Twinbee Paradise 2
- Twinbee Paradise 3
- TV Game Radions R
- Uha Uha Daihōsō Anime Street
- Ultra Mania Banzai
- Voice of Wonderland

=== Other ===
- CD Data FANet Artist Information: Kouda Mariko
- Idol on Stage
- Minna no Uta: Ame nochi Special
- Music Jump
- Music Voice: Seiyū Idol Daishūgō
- Seishun Adventure: Majo-tachi no Tasogare
- Yūshoku Banzai CX

== Discography ==
=== Singles ===
==== Konami Music ====
- Bokura no Suteki (written by Masami Tozawa/ composed by Katsuki Maeda) / Harmony (composed by Miki Matsubara), 1994
- Mimikaki wo shiteiru to (written by Masami Tozawa/ composed by Toshio Kamei) / Dare no Sei demo nai Futari (written by Masami Tozawa/ composed by Miki Matsubara), 1995
- Watashi ga Tenshi dattara ii noni (written by Yoshiko Miura, Mariko Kouda/ composed by Miki Matsubara) / Machibuse (written/composed by Yumi Matsutōya), 1996
- Yume wa Hitori mirumono janai (composed by Miki Matsubara) / Owaranai Encore (composed by Akio Minami), 1996
- Egao de aishiteru (written/composed by Tomoko Tane) / Dore dake aisareru ka janakute (composed by Miki Matsubara),1997
- Kaze ga tomaranai (written/composed by Tomoko Tane) / Soba ni iru kara (written/composed by Mariko Kouda), 1997
- Ame nochi Special (composed by Miki Matsubara) / Iidasenakute (composed by Uni Inoue), 1997
- Looking For (composed by Marron Nagatsuki) / Ōzora no Achira e (composed by Tatsuya Nishiwaki), 1998
- Cobalt (composed by Hideshi Hachino) / Sha-La-La~Futari~ (composed by Miki Matsubara), 1998
- Taisetsu ni Omoerumono ga issho nara ii yone (composed by Marron Nagatsuki) / Ganbare! Rōnin (composed by Uni Inoue), 1998
- Matte imashita (written/composed by Tomoko Tane) / Taiyō de ikō! (composed by Kaori Okui), 1999

==== King Records ====
On King Records

- Chikyū no Omoi～Hoshi no Omoi～ / Ame Agari no Asa ni / Setsuna.
- Clear / Nemuri no Umi
- Hachimitsu / Sekaichū no Post / Natsu Iro no Hana
- Hana / Machi ni Kesarenaimono / Hifumi yo
- Jiyū na Tsubasa / Daisuki Nandamono!
- Kara no Te no Hira / Namida Kumo no Ue ni / Nichiyōbi no Taikutsu
- Kimi ga Iru Sora / Yasashii Tsuki
- Kokoro no Yajirushi / Asa Iro no Wappen / Eki made no Michi wo
- Monshirochō / Deatta Goro ni / Fukukaze no Naka de
- Niji ga Yonderu / Koi ha Bōken
- Sabishigari ya no Koi / Wasurenai de～Forever We're Together～ / Henachoko
- Sono Toki made / Spice / Boku no Seikatsu
- Ta·ra·ra / Serial to Kiss / Haruka～To My Mother & Father on the Earth～
- Wish (as Shaorin)

=== Drama ===
- CD Drama: Eiyū Densetsu III: Shiroki Majo (Kurisu)
- Dengeki CD Bunko: Samurai Spirits (Nakoruru)
- Falcom Special Box '97 CD Drama: Eiyū Densetsu III vs. Brandish VT (Kurisu)
- Kishō Seireiki 1: Shūchū Gōu no Tsubishikata (Yumemi, Naiasu, Suhichimi, Ugaia)
- Kishō Seireiki 2: Tadashii Taifū no Okoshikata (Yumemi, Naiasu, Suhichimi, Ugaia)
- Kishō Seireiki 3: Shōryō-san to no Sugoshikata (Yumemi, Naiasu, Suhichimi, Ugaia)
- Popful Mail Paradise (Kachūsha)
- Popful Mail: The Next Generation (Kachūsha)
- TARAKO Pappara Paradise (Kachūsha)
- Tinkle Saver NOVA (Hayana Suzuna)
- Zelda no Densetsu Sound & Drama (Zelda)

=== Albums ===
- Aitakute
- B Side Collection
- Daisuki na Uta
- Happy! Happy! Happy!
- Kiss (mini album)
- Kono Sora kara Kikoeru
- Mariko Kouda Concert Tour '95–'96: Owaranai Encore
- Metronome
- My Best Friend (best album)
- My Best Friend 2 (best album)
- My Best Friend 3 (best album)
- Nande Datteba!?
- Neiro Enpitsu Jūni Iro
- Pure
- Pure Energy (selection album)
- Sora
- Twinbee Vocal Paradise featuring Mariko Kouda (best album)
- Vitamin Punch!
- Vivid
- Yatte Miyō

=== Other albums ===
- Eru Sanku: Koiki na Kanajo-tachi (vol.1-5)
- GS Mikami Utsukushiki Dōbōsha (vol.1-5)
- Honki ni Shinai de / Itsuka May Be
- Idol Project Special CD (included in limited edition of game)
- Kimi ga Daisuki / Happy Birthday Present
- Kuchibiru ni Promise
- Made in Heaven: Ai no Bride
- Melody: Dakishimete / Story
- Minna Chikyū no Nakama-tachi: Pink no Wani
- Mitsumete Knight Original Soundtrack (only includes Ann's game version of the song which is slightly different from the full version)
- Mitsumete Knight ~Vocalize~ (contains Ann's full version of her song)
- Moment
- Saigo no Yakusoku / Kyō no Owari ni
- Seiyū Grand Prix Club Special '95 '96
- Sunday Island
- Tenshi no Sugao (OVA insert CD single)
