= Stinger (1986 video game) =

1986 video game

- North American NES box art
- Developer: Konami
- Publisher: Konami
- Designer: Kazuhiro Aoyama
- Composers: Kiyohiro Sada (NES, FDS); Shinya Sakamoto (Famicom)
- Series: TwinBee
- Platforms: Famicom Disk System, Famicom/NES
- Release: Famicom Disk System: JP: November 21, 1986; NES: NA: September 1987; JP: March 26, 1993
- Genre: Scrolling shooter
- Modes: Single-player, multiplayer

Stinger (Note: Released in Japan as Moero TwinBee: Cinnamon-hakase o Sukue! (もえろツインビー シナモン博士を救え!)) is a 1986 scrolling shooter video game developed and published by Konami. It was originally released for the Family Computer Disk System (FDS) in Japan in 1986, and later for the Nintendo Entertainment System in North America in late 1987, making it one of the few games in the series to have a release outside of Japan. As with Konami's other FDS titles, Castlevania and Bio Miracle Bokutte Upa, it was later re-released in 1993 as a standard Famicom game with some minor changes. Stinger was the second game in the TwinBee series, as well as the first of two TwinBee sequels released for the Famicom, followed by TwinBee 3: Poko Poko Daimaō in 1989.

== Gameplay ==
Stinger can be played by up to three players simultaneously: the first two players control TwinBee and WinBee (the ships from the previous game) using the standard Famicom controllers, while the third player controls GwinBee (a green ship) by connecting an additional controller into the console's expansion port. Unlike the original TwinBee, which only featured vertical-scrolling stages, Stinger adds side-scrolling stages to the mix as well. There are seven stages in the game. Stages 1, 3, and 7 are side-scrolling stages, while the rest are vertical-scrolling stages. The controls remain the same between the two styles of gameplay, with the only difference being that in the side-scrolling segments, the A button shoots hearts over the ship instead of dropping bombs into the ground like the vertical-scrolling segments, which helps the player keep the power-up bells afloat in the side-scrolling stages.

The player's primary power-up items are once again bells that uncovered by shooting floating clouds throughout the stages. There are six types of bells in this installment: the regular yellow bells give the player bonus points as usual, the blue bell increases the ship's speed; the white bell upgrades the player's gun into a twin cannon; the pink bell gives the player a laser beam cannon; the flashing pink/white bell gives the player's ship mirror options for added firepower; and the flashing blue/white bell will surround the player's ship with a barrier for extra protection from enemy fire. Some power-ups are mutually exclusive, such as the white and pink bells. Other power-ups can be obtained by destroying ground enemies such as a moon item, which gives the player's ship a three-way shot, and a star item, which gives it a five-way shot. If two players are playing the game, they can align their ship together to turn their gun into a ripple laser.

== Release ==
Stinger was re-released for the Wii Virtual Console in Japan in 2010, and also for the Wii U Virtual Console in Japan and North America in 2015.

== Reception ==
Reception

Review score
Publication	Score
Nintendo Life	7/10

Joel Couture of Nintendo Life score the game 7 out of 10 in a review for Wii U Virtual Console re-release, praising the cute visuals.
