= TwinBee RPG =

1998 video game

- Developer: Konami Computer Entertainment Tokyo
- Publisher: Konami
- Series: TwinBee
- Platform: PlayStation
- Release: JP: April 2, 1998
- Genre: Role-playing
- Mode: Single-player

TwinBee RPG (ツインビーRPG; fully titled TwinBee Role Playing Game on the game's packaging) is a 1998 role-playing video game developed and published by Konami for the PlayStation. Released exclusively in Japan, it is a spin-off of the TwinBee shoot 'em up series, featuring a storyline based on the TwinBee Paradise audio drama serial.

== Gameplay ==
The game is a 3D RPG, and not a shooting game like the other TwinBee titles.

The player controls a new protagonist who is summoned to Donburi Island to serve as a temporary pilot for TwinBee following the mysterious disappearance of TwinBee's regular pilot Light. Although the TwinBee series had previous installments that were not shoot-'em-ups, such as Pop'n TwinBee: Rainbow Bell Adventures and TwinBee: Taisen Puzzle-Dama, TwinBee RPG featured an entirely different illustrator and developing team. Konami developed TwinBee RPG primarily to cater fans of the TwinBee Paradise radio and anime series who were not good at playing shoot-'em-ups. Although Konami hoped to use the popularity of the radio and anime voice cast to promote the game, the game's sales were not enough to cover its production values and TwinBee RPG became the final game in the TwinBee series (excluding later ports and mobile applications). While TwinBee RPG is primarily a role-playing video game, it features a dating sim-system similar to Konami's Tokimeki Memorial series in which the protagonist tries to gain the favor of various girls. The endings vary depending on who is the girl most impressed by the protagonist.

The experience points obtained from defeating enemies are acquired at a fixed rate (160 points from small fry enemies and 600 from bosses), which are then raised or lowered depending on the level differences between allied and enemy characters (there the weakest members of the player's party are given more experience points from defeating the same group of enemies). Moreover, the party member who delivers the finishing blow to an enemy gets extra experience points. Regardless of the current level, each party member must acquire around 5,000 experience points in order to level-up (although TwinBee is not restricted by this limit at the start of the story). In addition to combat, the player can also gain experience by doing assorted favors to townspeople in villages. Money (called "en" in this game) dropped by enemy tend to be very few, instead the player acquired profit by selling fruits and items left behind by defeated enemies. The fruits that can be found includes (from least valuable to most valuable) satsumas, apples, grapes, cherries, and peaches.

Although the game features full voiceovers, the protagonist's name is never mentioned in any of the dialogue.

== Plot ==
The unnamed protagonist is the player's alter-ego whose name can be decided at the start of the game. He is summoned by Princess Melora from the real world in order to save the TwinBee world. His distinguishing characters includes an outfit consists of a cap, knee-long trousers, and a vest, and an androgynous face with shoulder-long hair. His personality can be changed by the player from serious to rebellious or even perverted depending on the player's actions. Although the protagonist was designed so that his age and gender would be ambiguous according to interviews with the developers, the game's supporting cast such as Madoka and Vieren refer to the protagonist by male pronouns.

== Development and release ==
The game is based on the radio drama Twinbee Paradise.

It was released on April 2, 1998, and was re-released for the Konami the Best in December 1999. It was later released again for the PSone Books in November 2003.

Mariko Kouda performed the ending theme song of the game.

Junko Kawano was a planner for the game, and she had previously been a character designer for Suikoden.

== Reception ==
Famitsu upon release gave it a score of 24 out of 40.

Three reviewers in Dengeki PlayStation gave it scores of 55, 50, 65, and 85 for a total of 255/400.

Gamers' Republic gave it a B−.

Joypad gave it a 5/10.
