= Pop'n TwinBee =

1993 video game

- European box art
- Developer: Konami
- Publishers: JP: Konami; PAL: Palcom Software
- Composers: Kazuhiko Uehara; Masahiro Ikariko; Hideto Inoue; Tomoya Tomita; Nobuyuki Akena; Masae Nakashima; Saiko Miki; Michiru Yamane
- Series: TwinBee
- Platform: Super Nintendo Entertainment System
- Release: JP: March 26, 1993; PAL: 1993
- Genre: Scrolling shooter
- Modes: Single-player, multiplayer

Pop'n Twinbee (Pop'n(ポップン)ツインビー) is a 1993 scrolling shooter video game developed and published by Konami for the Super Famicom in Japan; the game was also released for the Super Nintendo Entertainment System in the PAL region. It is the sixth game in the TwinBee series and a direct follow-up to the arcade game Detana!! TwinBee (Bells & Whistles). The European version was published by Konami's Palcom Software division and was the first of three TwinBee games localized for the European market, followed by a Game Boy version of Pop'n TwinBee (which was actually an earlier game titled TwinBee Da!! in Japan) and the platform game Pop'n TwinBee: Rainbow Bell Adventures. It was released in North America 27 years after its Super Famicom launch through a February 2020 update to the Nintendo Classics service.

== Plot ==
The game's opening sequence shows TwinBee and WinBee patrolling the skies of Donburi Island when they suddenly receive a distress signal from a young girl named Madoka, the granddaughter of Dr. Mardock, who was once a benevolent scientist until a bump in the head turned him insane. Dr. Mardock now seeks to conquer the world with an army of Acorn Men and only TwinBee and WinBee can stop him.

== Gameplay ==
The gameplay is similar to Detana!! TwinBee, the second coin-op game in the series, but with a few notable additions and changes. Like in previous TwinBee, up to two players can play simultaneously, Player 1 controls TwinBee (the blue aircraft), while Player 2 controls WinBee (the pink aircraft). When the player begins the game, they'll be asked to enter their name and choose between three types of companion ships (whether their companions will follow their ship, engulf them, or surround them). The player's objective is to maneuver their spacecraft through a series of seven stages and defeat every enemy who gets in the way, facing a boss at the end of each stage. Unlike previous games, instead of extra lives, the player has a life meter that determines how much damage the player's ship can take before losing. When the player loses, they will be given a chance to restart at the stage where they left off, but only limited chances are given to continue.

Like in previous Twinbee games, the player shoots at airborne enemies with their gun and drops bombs to the land. The player can also attack airborne enemies with their ship's punches as well at close range. The player can shoot tiny-sized replicas of their ship that will fly and attack all on-screen enemies. The player can only perform this attack based on the number of stocks they have. During a 2-player game, one player can give the other player a bit of their life energy to replenish it or even use the other player's ship as a projectile against the enemy. As usual, the main power-up items are bells that can change colors by shooting them in the air, giving the player a different upgrade when one is retrieved depending on the bell's color.

On the game's option settings, the player can adjust the game's difficulty, controls, and sound, as well as switch between "normal" and "couple" mode. During couple mode, the enemy attacks will aim primarily at Player 1 if two players are playing together. This feature is intended to allow less experienced players enjoy the game if they're playing with a more experience partner.

== Soundtrack ==
The upbeat and light hearted soundtrack, composed by Kazuhiko Uehara among others, takes influence from Japanese Idol songs.

== Reception ==
Reception

Review scores
Publication	Score
Computer and Video Games	93/100
Famitsu	30/40
GamesMaster	75%
Official Nintendo Magazine	86/100
Super Play	84%
Total!	(UK) 78% (DE) 2-
Hippon Super!	7/10
Marukatsu Super Famicom	7/10, 7/10, 10/10, 9/10
Nintendo Game Zone	89/100
SNES Force	80/100
Super Action	92%
Super Control	53%
The Super Famicom	80/100
Super Gamer	61%
Super Pro	61/100

According to Famitsu, Pop'n TwinBee sold over 40,539 copies in its first week on the market and sold approximately 146,124 copies during its lifetime in Japan. The game received a 23.17/30 score in a 1993 readers' poll conducted by Super Famicom Magazine, ranking among Super Famicom titles at the number 38 spot. It also received generally favorable reviews from critics.
