= Harmful Park =

1997 video game

- Developer: Sky Think System
- Publisher: Sky Think System
- Director: Kenichi Fujita
- Producers: Junji Ōura; Masahiro Kubota
- Designer: Hisato Igami
- Programmer: Tomohisa Yamagata
- Artists: Chinatsu Shibata; Eiji Kuroda; Hideki Nishimura
- Composer: Hitoshi Sawa
- Platform: PlayStation
- Release: JP: February 14, 1997
- Genre: Scrolling shooter
- Modes: Single-player, multiplayer

Harmful Park: High-brow Gag and Pure Shooting (Note: Japanese: ハームフルパーク, Hepburn: Hāmufuru Pāku) is a 1997 horizontally scrolling shooter video game developed and published by Sky Think System for the PlayStation in Japan. Set in a theme park, the game has been described as a cute 'em up and resembles Konami's Parodius games. It has become somewhat of a collector's item, and one of the rarest shooters on the PlayStation.

== Gameplay ==
Gameplay screenshot

Harmful Park is a horizontal scrolling 2D shooting game. Enemies in the game include gorillas, inflatable dinosaurs, and a gigantic woman. The game also features exotic weapons, including jelly beans and ice cream. The game has six stages in total. There are four kinds of shots that the player's ship can fire, each with its own strengths and weaknesses. "Pie spread" for example fires continuously, while "Jelly Boomerang" tracks enemies, but has low attack power. Three additional minigames are available as well.

== Plot ==
The game is set in a theme park, after a scientist named Dr. Tequila makes the rides and machines of the park go berserk. Another scientist orders her daughters to reclaim the park, using flying machines. The park has now been converted into a fortified base.

== Development ==
Harmful Park was developed by Japanese game developer Sky Think System, and it was the final game they developed. The developer intended the game to have comedic elements, and to be enjoyable for a wide variety of gamers of all ages and genders.

== Release ==
The game was released in Japan on February 14, 1997, and re-released in 2012 for the PlayStation Network again only in Japan.

== Reception ==
Reception

Review score
Publication	Score
Dengeki PlayStation	75/100, 80/100

Upon release, Famitsu gave it a score of 26 out of 40.

Multiple reviewers noted the similarities between Harmful Park, and the Parodius series and described the game as a "cute em up".

In 2014, Eurogamer listed the game among gaming's "most valuable treasures", praising the graphics, humor, and noting that while not difficult, it has personality. GamesTM described it as a cross between Parodius, and Coryoon. Retro Gamer listed it as number 6 on their list of "The 20 Greatest PlayStation Games You've Never Played".
