= Bio Miracle Bokutte Upa =

1988 video game

- FDS cover art
- Developer: Konami
- Publisher: Konami
- Composers: Kouji Murata, Seiichi Fukami, Yuko Kurahashi, Kiyohiro Sada, Atsushi Fujio (FDS); Seiichi Fukami, Atsushi Fujio, Kozo Nakamura, Kaori Kinouchi, Ayako Nishigaki, Kouji Murata, Yuko Kurahashi (FC)
- Platforms: Family Computer Disk System, Family Computer, Mobile Phones (i-mode)
- Release: Famicom Disk System: JP: April 22, 1988; Famicom: JP: February 26, 1993; i-Revo: JP: September 15, 2006; i-mode: JP: November 1, 2006
- Genre: Platformer
- Mode: Single-player

Bio Miracle Bokutte Upa (バイオミラクル ぼくってウパ, Baio Mirakuru - Bokutte Upa; lit. "Bio Miracle - I'm Upa") is a Konami video game that was first released for a Japan-exclusive market in 1988 for the Family Computer Disk System. It was later released as a cartridge in 1993 for the Family Computer itself.

It was released on the Wii's Virtual Console in 2008, for Japan and North America in June, and in Europe on August 29. It was released for the Nintendo 3DS's and Wii U's Virtual Console in Japan in February 2014 and July 2015, respectively. The Wii Virtual Console release was the only official release of the game outside Japan.

== Story ==
"Upa is the prince of a magical kingdom and the most recent in a line of brave fighters. One day, though, he broke an urn containing the spirit of Zai, an incredibly evil goatish demon who takes the life force of the kingdom's adults and kidnaps all the babies - except for Upa, who is given a magical rattle by a fairy who was trapped in the urn along with Zai. And so, in order to save his kingdom, Upa crawls into action..."

== Gameplay ==
In-game screenshot

Bio Miracle Bokutte Upa's main character is a baby called Upa that uses a rattle to attack his enemies. When injured by the rattle, the enemy inflates and floats away. These inflated enemies can then be used as temporary floating platforms to climb to higher places or they can also be used as weapons if pushed in any direction. If used as a platform, Upa must not stay on top for too long or otherwise it will explode. But if used as a weapon, Upa has to pounce or use his rattle on the inflated enemy to cause it to careen. The enemy will then ricochet off objects and potentially cause damage to both the protagonist and other enemies if it comes in contact with them.

The game uses a health meter to monitor the player's remaining life which can be replenished by obtaining bottles of milk scattered throughout the levels. A heart icon can also be obtained, increasing the maximum health by one unit for the duration of the current world.

Most items, including the milk bottles and hearts, can be collected by striking special blocks which feature Upa's face. Other items include: Apples, which increase the player's score; hourglasses, which temporarily freeze enemies in place; bells, which give Upa temporary invincibility and the ability to run; and scorpion blocks, which kill all enemies on-screen when they are pushed off a platform and hit the ground.

== Release history ==
=== Cartridge version ===
In 1993, it was released as a cartridge for the Famicom itself. While it is practically identical to the Disk System version of the game, there are a few differences.

The most notable difference is the game's sound. The Family Computer Disk System contained an extra audio channel not available in the Family Computer/NES games. To compensate for the missing audio channel, the music in the Family Computer cartridge version had to be remixed.

Additionally, the player is given a choice between an "Easy" mode, where enemy damage is reduced and the player starts with more lives, and a "Normal" mode, which is the same difficulty as the original FDS version.

Finally, among the smallest of alterations to the game is the title screen, which no longer contains a large image of Upa when it is first displayed.

=== Chinese version ===
An unlicensed version for the Famicom was released in China under the name Crayon Xiao xin (蠟筆小新 Làbǐ xiǎo xīn, Crayon Shin-chan's Chinese title), in which the playable character is replaced with Shinnosuke Nohara, the star of the series.

=== Mobile phone version ===
In 2006, Bio Miracle Bokutte Upa was released for mobile phones.

=== Virtual Console ===
The Family Computer Disk System version was released on the Wii's Virtual Console in 2008, for Japan and North America in June and in Europe on August 29. The Wii Virtual Console release was the only official release of the game outside Japan.

The game was released for the Nintendo 3DS's and Wii U's Virtual Console in Japan in February 2014 and July 2015, respectively.

== Other appearances ==
Upa has many guest appearances in other Konami games:

- Wai Wai World 2: SOS!! Parsley Jō (Famicom)

Upa appears as a possible transformation of the main character, the robot Rickle, and plays similarly to how he did in his home game.

- Parodius series

- Fantastic Parodius - Pursue the Glory of the Past (Super Famicom only)

Konami's Parodius series is a cartoonish scrolling shooter with bizarre and nonsensical enemies and theme. In the Super Famicom release of the third title of the Parodius series, a flying version of Upa and his sister Rupa (a pink, palette swapped second player character) appear as space ships with milk bottle missiles. In addition, one level features burrowing through a candy-filled cake similar to the one in Bio Miracle Bokutte Upa.

- Jikkyō Oshaberi Parodius

Upa and Rupa appeared again as playable "space ships" in Konami's surrealist shooter series.

- pop'n music series (Arcade, PlayStation 2)

As of pop'n music 9, Upa appears as a character in the song Bokutte Upa?, a rearrangement of music from his home game. Rupa appears as a palette swap of Upa. Rupa previously appeared as the character for the song TwinBee ~Generation X~, a rearrangement of music from TwinBee, until pop'n music 17 THE MOVIE, where the song received a dedicated TwinBee character.

- Konami Wai Wai World (mobile phone)

In the mobile version that was released in 2006, due to copyright issues, The Goonies's Mikey's behalf as a character, has appeared with the cake-conscious stage of this work. This version also features S! Applications and BREW versions later.

- Baseball Spirits Series Pro Series Powerful Pro Baseball

The main theme has been included in the creation mode to fight songs of the sample songs and cheering Purosupi Power Pro.

- Pixel Puzzle Collection

Upa, Kappa, Crab and Crow appears as the nonogram puzzles.

- Picross S: Konami Antiques Edition

Certain Konami characters and items appear as nonogram puzzles, including Upa and the returning Azarashin.

- In episode #44 of GameCenter CX (known as Retro Game Master outside Japan), Shinya Arino, the host of the show, played through the Famicom Disk System version of the game and successfully cleared it.
