= Penta no Tsuri Bōken =

2003 video game

- Title screen of the game
- Developer: Konami
- Publisher: Konami
- Series: Antarctic Adventure
- Platform: Mobile phone
- Release: May 7, 2003
- Genre: Fishing
- Mode: Single-player

Penta no Tsuri Bōken (ペン太の釣冒険, "The Penta's Fishing Adventure") was a fishing video game based on the Antarctic Adventure series. It was developed by Konami and released on May 7, 2003 exclusively in Japan for mobile phones. In mid-2004, the game was reissued and hosted by Konami for download for the then internet-based online platform Konami Net DX (コナミネットDX, Konami Netto DX) with the title Penta no Tsuri Bōken DX (ペン太の釣冒険DX, "The Penta's Fishing Adventure DX"). The game is no longer available for download, as the service was shut down years later to make way for the new (international) My KONAMI service.

== See also ==
- Antarctic Adventure
