= Free Talk Studio =

1997 video game

- Developer: Media Entertainment
- Publisher: Media Entertainment
- Platforms: Sega Saturn, PlayStation, Windows
- Release: Sega Saturn: JP: 9 May 1997; PlayStation: JP: 25 September 1997
- Genre: Simulation video game
- Mode: Single-player

Free Talk Studio is a 1997 radio DJ simulation game developed and published by Media Entertainment for Sega Saturn, PlayStation, and Windows.

== Gameplay ==
Free Talk Studio is a simulation game in which the player takes on the role of Mari Kousaka, who was just hired as a DJ. There is then a choice of three out of four guests to interview: Aya Isokawa, a comedian (played by voice actress Aya Hisakawa); Nanacy Hiruma, an eccentric artist; Miyu Enjoji, and Kururi Shibasaki. If the player does well enough throughout these interviews by picking from multiple choice dialogues, they will go on to interview superstar Natsumi Kawai. The ultimate goal is to convince her to sing a jingle for Mari's radio show.

The game is set up much like a dating sim. The main gameplay comes from multiple choice selections, and most endings involve whichever character the player held the strongest interview with. The Miyu Enjoji ending even includes a lingerie scene. As all of the guests are female, this could almost classify as a GxG sim, though the male manager and executive endings make this barely an all pairings title.

== Development and release ==
The Sega Saturn version of Free Talk Studio was announced in Saturn Fan magazine in December 1996. Further details were released in the magazine's February 1997 and March 1997 issues.

Free Talk Studio was released for the Saturn on 9 May 1997, and for the PlayStation on 25 September 1997. A version for Windows 95 was also released.

Two different packaging editions were produced, a blue case and a red case. The blue case contains three cards featuring the lead voice actress from the game, Mariko Kōda, alongside the characters she played, Mari Kousaka and Natsumi Kawai; the red case contains a photo booklet which also focuses on her. While there are no bonus packaging variants for the PlayStation version such as in the Saturn version, there are two releases, the difference being that one is on the Best of the Best label.

== Reception ==
Free Talk Studio received generally mixed reviews. In the May 1997 issue of the Japanese Sega Saturn Magazine, three reviewers awarded the game 7/10, 5/10, and 6/10, praising the voice acting and branching scenarios but criticizing its graphics. It was also reviewed in Famitsu in May 1997, which awarded it a score of 25/40.
