= Parodius (1988 video game) =

Parodius: The Octopus Saves the Earth
- Developer: Konami
- Publisher: Konami
- Composer: Kinuyo Yamashita
- Series: Parodius
- Platforms: MSX, mobile phone
- Release: MSX: JP: April 28, 1988; Mobile i-mode: JP: December 1, 2006; S Appli!: JP: May 1, 2007
- Genre: Scrolling shooter
- Modes: Single-player, multiplayer

Parodius: The Octopus Saves the Earth (Note: Japanese: パロディウス ～タコは地球を救う～, Hepburn: Parodiusu: Tako wa Chikyū o Sukū), also known as Parodius, is a 1988 horizontally scrolling shooter video game developed by Konami for the MSX. It is the first title in the Parodius series, although it is often confused with its sequel Parodius! From Myth to Laughter. The name itself is a portmanteau of "Gradius" and "Parody" and, eponymously, the game is a parody of the Gradius series of space-based horizontally scrolling shooters. Many of the characters and enemies are derived from that famous shooter series, while other elements are extracted from other Konami titles, such as Antarctic Adventure and TwinBee. This game is of particular note in the series as being heavily infused with Japanese culture and folklore.

== Gameplay ==
The gameplay is very similar to the Gradius games, with other aspects from games such as TwinBee. However, the characters are replaced with silly characters taken from either these or other Konami games, as well as Japanese culture. The music is mostly taken from classical music pieces.

The player can play as either Tako, an octopus, the Penguin (father of Pentarou) from Antarctic Adventure and the exclusive MSX game Penguin Adventure, Goemon from the Ganbare Goemon series, the Popolon knight from the MSX game Knightmare or the Vic Viper spaceship from Gradius. The game is composed of six stages consisting of various obstacles and enemies such as penguins and bees, as well as more traditional Gradius enemies such as moai. As with Gradius, the game utilizes a similar selection-bar based power-up system.

== Reception ==
Zero rated the game 93/100, praising its animated landscapes, gameplay, music, and overall weirdness. Games-X called the game "brilliant," pointing to its graphics, music, and gameplay, but criticized the continue option upon game over.

Parodius was awarded "Best Game that Never Came out in the U.S." in 1992 by Electronic Gaming Monthly.

== Ports ==
Parodius was later included in Konami Antiques MSX Collection Vol.3 for PlayStation, Konami Antiques MSX Collection Ultra Pack for Sega Saturn and Parodius Portable for PlayStation Portable with enhanced graphics.

In addition, it was released for mobile phones in December 2006 and for Wii Virtual Console on January 12, 2010, and Wii U on December 25, 2013, in Japan. Also, the MSX version was re-released for Windows PCs on Online Store Project EGG on April 11, 2014, in Japan.

== Legacy ==
In 2021, Konami announced a contest encouraging indie developers to make games based on some of its classic series, including Parodius: The Octopus Saves the Earth.
