= TwinBee 3: Poko Poko Daimaō =

1989 video game

- Famicom box art
- Developer: Konami
- Publisher: Konami
- Composers: Atsushi Fujio; Hidehiro Funauchi; Katsuhiko Suzuki
- Series: TwinBee
- Platforms: Famicom, mobile phone
- Release: Famicom: JP: September 29, 1989; I-revo: JP: April 14, 2006
- Genre: Scrolling shooter
- Modes: Single-player, multiplayer

TwinBee 3: Poko Poko Daimaō (Note: TwinBee 3: Poko Poko Daimaō (ツインビー３ ポコポコ大魔王, Tsuinbī Surī Poko Poko Daimaō; lit. The Great Demon King Poko Poko)) is a 1989 vertically scrolling shooter video game developed and published by Konami for the Family Computer. It was the third game in the TwinBee series released for the Famicom, following the home version of the original TwinBee and the Famicom-exclusive Moero TwinBee. Unlike Moero, which was released in North America as Stinger, TwinBee 3 was a Japan-only release. It was re-released on April 14, 2006 as part of the i-Revo downloadable game service.

TwinBee 3 ditches the side-scrolling stages from Stinger and only features top-scrolling ones similar to the original. Moreover, the game lacks the 3-Player mode from Moero, allowing only up to two players. The game is considerably easier than its predecessors due to an option mode that allows players to adjust the difficulty and number of ships, as well as the inclusion of the new "soul reviving system", which allows players to recover their power-ups after losing a ship.

The game uses digitized PCM voice samples, particularly when the conga music in one stage chants "Poko Poko", and in the beginning of each stage, in which a voice proclaims the name of the stage.

== Characters ==
TwinBee
The default Player 1 aircraft, colored blue, Twinbee can fire up to two shots rapidly and has a barrier durability of ten shots.
WinBee
The default Player 2 aircraft, colored red, Winbee can fire up to four shots rapidly and has a barrier durability of fifteen shots.
GwinBee
A green-colored aircraft and the baby brother of TwinBee and WinBee. He was kidnapped by Poko Poko during an errand.

In the instruction manual of Detana TwinBee Yahho! Deluxe Pack, the pilots of the three ships are identified as Dr. Cinnamon's great grandchildren: Squash, Whip, and Mellow. They were originally nameless in the actual game.

== Game system ==
=== Controls ===
The player maneuvers the ship with the D-Pad. One button is used to shoot the gun at airborne enemies, while the other drops bombs at ground enemies. If both arms of the player's ships are destroyed, then the player will be incapable of dropping bombs. When that happens, an ambulance will appear that can repair both arms. The player can uncover bell power-ups by shooting the floating clouds. Shooting a bell several times will change their colors.

=== Bell power-ups ===
Yellow Bell
Gives the player bonus points. The more yellow bells are picked up without missing one, the greater the points will be (500, 1,000, 2,500, 5,000, and eventually 10,000 points).
Blue Bell
Increases the ship's speed by one level. The speed can be increased up to seven times.
White Bell
Turns the player's gun into a double shot.
Red Bell
Causes the player's gun to shoot an enemy piercing laser beam.
Flashing Red/Blue Bell
Creates image copies of the player's ship that will imitate their actions, increasing their firepower.
Flashing Blue/White Bell
Creates a barrier that will protect the player's ship from enemy fire. It gradually becomes small as it takes damage until eventually disappears. When two players are both equipped with a barrier and they unite their ships, the barrier takes the shape of an umbrella.

=== Ground items ===
Question mark
Destroys all on-screen enemies.
Fruits
Gives bonus points.
Dollar sign
Gives bonus points.
Milk bottle
Gives an extra ship.
Candy
Turns the player's gun into a three-way shot.
Fire match
Causes a fire bell to appear in the sky. When the player picks it up, they will be invincible for a moment until they reach the boss.
Dr. Cinnamon
Takes the player to a bonus stage after completing the current stage.

=== Combination attacks ===
Wide Shot
When TwinBee and WinBee travel next to each other side by side, they shoot four star-shaped beams, three towards themselves and one behind them.
Super Barrier
When TwinBee and WinBee are lined up one towards the other vertically, it will cause a star-shaped beam to appear that travels around the two ships in a circular pattern, destroying any enemy who comes near.

=== Soul recovery system ===
When the player loses a life, a ghost version of their ship will be floating around at the spot where it was destroyed. When the player respawns and picks up the ghost, they will recover all the power-ups their ship had in its previous life.

== Stages ==
In the options menu, the player can choose the order in which the first four stages are played. Moreover, the difficulty can be changed between "comfortable" or "hell".

1. Air Island - a floating island created by Poko Poko. The enemies are musical instruments. The boss is the Crystal Traveler.
2. Wanana Bani - a tropical forest stage where the enemies are banana-shaped crocodiles. The bosses are the Ghost Ukulele Band.
3. Castle Land - a medieval stage where the enemies are witches and dragons. The bosses are tooth cavities that are inhabiting a giant dragon's mouth.
4. Dungeon - a coal mine stage with rail carts. Enemies includes various animals such as elephants and octopuses. The boss is Unadon, a giant eel.
5. Final Stage - a checkerboard stages where large cannons and windows are placed on the ground. The enemies are items related to magicians such as top hats, playing cards, and sticks. The boss is the Evil King Poko Poko.

== Other media ==
- In issue #4, episode 46, TwinBee 3: Poko Poko Daimaō is adapted for the manga titled Warera Hobby's: Famicom Seminar (われらホビーズファミコンゼミナール, Ware-ra Hobīzu Famikon Zemināru) which was published from 1988 to 1990.
