= Getsu Fūma Den: Undying Moon =

2022 video game

- Developers: Konami; GuruGuru
- Publisher: Konami
- Director: Yuki Yamashita
- Producer: Shin Murato
- Engine: Unreal Engine 4
- Platforms: Nintendo Switch; Microsoft Windows
- Release: Nintendo Switch; 9 February 2022; Microsoft Windows; 17 February 2022
- Genres: Action-adventure; Hack and slash; Platform; Roguevania
- Mode: Single-player

Getsu Fūma Den: Undying Moon is a hack-and-slash roguevania platformer video game co-developed by Konami and GuruGuru and published by Konami. The game was released in 2022 for Nintendo Switch on 9 February, and for Windows on 17 February. It is the sequel to the 1987 game Getsu Fūma Den, which was originally developed and published by Konami for the Famicom exclusively in Japan.

== Gameplay ==
Getsu Fūma Den: Undying Moon is a 2.5D hack and slash roguevania platformer. The player controls Fūma and must guide him through a set of eight procedurally generated levels with a Japanese-styled ukiyo-e art style. While exploring the levels, the player has the ability to acquire several moves inspired by Japanese martial arts, and can pick up enhancements and customizable weapons. The game's combat centers around mastery of spacing, timing, and learning enemy attack patterns. If the player dies, they must start from the beginning. The player must defeat the boss at the end of each stage in order to progress to the next one.

== Plot ==
The seal to the gate of hell has been set loose by Ryukotsuki after 1,000 years of peace. This causes monsters to invade the surface world, and Fūma, the 27th leader of the Getsu clan, must find his lost brother and repair the broken seal by journeying into hell to stop the source of the cataclysm.

== Development ==
In April 2021, Konami unveiled Getsu Fūma Den: Undying Moon by posting a teaser trailer to their official YouTube channel. The game was available for Early Access on Steam on 13 May. Those who purchased the Early Access version of the game received certain perks such as a digital mini soundtrack and digital art book, in addition a port of the original Getsu Fūma Den. This port includes menus in both Japanese and English, but the rest of the game is not translated. The game was released in February 2022 for both Nintendo Switch and Windows.

The team took influence from younger staff members in order to create a roguelike with procedurally-generated levels with the intent of keeping the player entertained. This was done with the intent to encourage player growth, and in-game enhancements were made secondary in order to accomplish this design goal. The game features 3D character models that are meant to appear and move in the style of 2D. Backgrounds in the game are painted in the nihonga style draw inspiration from the Heian period, while the models in the game draw inspiration from the ukiyo-e style. Enemy designs are meant to evoke an eerie feel through unpredictable movements and joints that attach the wrong way.

== Reception ==
Reception

Aggregate score
Aggregator	Score
Metacritic	NS: 65/100

Review scores
Publication	Score
Destructoid	6.5/10
Nintendo Life	5/10
Nintendo World Report	6/10
TouchArcade	3/5

Getsu Fūma Den: Undying Moon received "mixed or average" reviews according to review aggregator Metacritic.

Destructoid gave the game a 6.5 out of 10, likening the game feel to Dead Cells while criticizing the poorly designed roguelike structure. Nintendo Life gave the game 5 stars out of 10, praising the art style, soundtrack, and potential, but criticized the lack of creativity, polish, updates, and technical performance in comparison to its contemporaries.
