= Meikyū Jiin Dababa =

- Developer(s): Konami
- Publisher(s): Konami
- Programmer(s): Nobuhiro Matsuoka
- Artist(s): Yoichi Yoshimoto
- Composer(s): Shinya Sakamoto; Satoe Terashima; Kiyohiro Sada
- Platform(s): Family Computer Disk System
- Release: JP: May 29, 1987
- Genre(s): Action
- Mode(s): Single player

Meikyū Jiin Dababa (迷宮寺院ダババ, lit. "Temple Labyrinth Dababa") is a 1987 action game by Konami for the Family Computer Disk System. It was only released in Japan.

== Gameplay ==
Meikyū Jiin Dababa is an overhead action, maze game where the player controls a monk. The gameplay is a bit unusual as the player can only move by hopping from tile to tile. The hopping system appears to have influence the Startropics games.

Most levels require to uncover seals hidden behind certain tiles, which sometimes need to be hopped on multiple times in order to fully reveal them. Once all the seals are uncovered, the gate to the next level is opened. Sometimes items and power-ups are also hidden behind those tiles. Many enemies will get into the monk's way, but the monk has the ability to shoot fireballs to destroy them. Boss fights are done in a side-scrolling view.

== Plot ==
The game takes place in India, where a monk has to retrieve his girlfriend kidnapped by a demon and locked away inside the Dababa labyrinth. It's now up to the monk to go into the labyrinth, destroy the demon and rescue his beloved girlfriend.

== Bibliography ==
- Kalata, Kurt (2017). Hardcore Gaming 101 Presents: Contra and Other Konami Classics. ISBN 978-1546928034.
