= Pop'n TwinBee: Rainbow Bell Adventures =

1994 video game

- European box art
- Developer: Konami
- Publisher: Konami
- Director: Yoshiharu Kambe
- Composers: Kenichi Matsubara; Yukie Morimoto; Saiko Miki
- Series: TwinBee
- Platform: Super NES
- Release: JP: 7 January 1994; EU: 1994
- Genre: Platform
- Modes: Single-player, multiplayer

Pop'n TwinBee: Rainbow Bell Adventures (Note: Released in Japan as TwinBee: Rainbow Bell Adventure (ツインビー ～レインボーベルアドベンチャー～)) is a 1994 platform game published and developed by Konami for the Super Nintendo Entertainment System. It is the first platformer in the TwinBee series, departing from the vertically scrolling shooter genre.

== Gameplay ==
Pop'n TwinBee: Rainbow Bell Adventures features three playable characters: TwinBee, WinBee or GwinBee. All characters use their punch to attack, which can be charged to unleash a punch wave. They have two sets of weapons, one of them is either a short or long-ranged weapon (a hammer for TwinBee, a lasso for WinBee, and throwing rattles for GwinBee), and the other one is a gun, which is a reference to Detana!! TwinBee's cutscene, in which TwinBee is shown with two guns on each hand. All three can temporally fly in eight directions by propelling via a rocket pack that must be charged, as well as hover.

Aside from their weapons, the major difference between the characters is the time they require to fully charge their punch wave or their rocket propeller: TwinBee has an average charging time; WinBee charges her rocket propeller the fastest, but takes the most to charge a punch wave; GwinBee, on the other hand, fills charges his punch quickly, but takes a while to charge his propeller.

The bell power-up from the rest of the series also appears here, and it allows any of the characters to obtain various kinds of power-ups, depending on the color of the bell, such as the sets of weapons, the gun, speed, options and invincibility. Unlike other TwinBee games, the bells are obtained by defeating enemies instead of shooting clouds.

The game also features a versus mode, in which players must defeat their opponents for three rounds.

== Regional differences ==
- The level order in the Japanese version is a set of levels arranged in a quadrilateral form, with an interconnection between different stages. Some stages have alternate exits, similar to Super Mario World. In the European version, the order is strictly linear and a specific level can't be accessed if the previous ones aren't cleared.
- The dialogue by Dr. Cinnamon and the pilots (Light, Pastel and Mint) at the level select screen were deleted in the European version.
- The European release only uses passwords for saving data, while the Japanese version uses primarily an internal battery back-up, but the passwords are also an option.
- The Japanese version has multiple endings depending on the player's performance.

== Reception ==
Reception

Review scores
Publication	Score
Computer and Video Games	81/100
Famitsu	28/40
GameFan	90%, 84%, 89%, 92%
GamesMaster	90/100
Super Play	70%
Total!	(UK) 90% (DE) 2+
Max Overload!	83%
Nintendo Game Zone	43/100
Super Action	80%
Super Control	86%
Super Gamer	72/100

According to Famitsu, Pop'n TwinBee: Rainbow Bell Adventures sold approximately 36,601 copies during its lifetime in Japan. Japanese publication Micom BASIC Magazine ranked the game tenth in popularity in its April 1994 issue, and it received a 23.1/30 score in a readers' poll conducted by Super Famicom Magazine. It also received generally favorable reviews from critics.
