= Kid Dracula (1993 video game) =

- Developer: Konami
- Publisher: Konami
- Series: Castlevania
- Platform: Game Boy
- Release: JP: January 3, 1993; NA: March 1993
- Genre: Platform
- Mode: Single-player

Kid Dracula (Note: Japanese: 悪魔城すぺしゃる ぼくドラキュラくん, Hepburn: Akumajō Supesharu: Boku Dorakyura-kun; lit. Demon Castle Special: Kid Dracula) is a 1993 platform game developed and published by Konami for the Game Boy. It is a spinoff of the Castlevania series and a sequel to the 1990 Famicom game also titled Kid Dracula. The game has the player control Kid Dracula who has forgotten most of his powers while the evil Garamoth is trying to take over his castle. As the player progresses through the games eight levels, Kid Dracula recalls his abilities which range from new ways to attack and traverse through levels.

Faith Johnson of Retro Gamer described the critical reception was generally positive about Kid Dracula. The game went on to be sell for high prices on the second hand market decades after its initial release.

== Development ==
Kid Dracula was developed and published by Konami.

Kid Dracula is a sequel to an earlier game for the Family Computer titled Akumajō Special: Boku Dracula kun (1990) which was initially only released in Japan. Faith Johnson of Retro Gamer said that the Game Boy felt more like a remake or reimagining of earlier title due to it having many levels that are similar in nature. While the game is recognized by Konami as being part of the Castlevania series, the game's it not part of the overall main canon. Johnson said the game was thought of as a parody of the series by fans.

== Gameplay and plot ==
Kid Dracula has forgotten all his powers, and must rediscover them before he can take down the evil Garamoth, who is trying to take over the castle.

Kid Dracula is a single-player platformer game. The game has eight levels with various different themes such as a ghost pirate ship, a volcano, a robotics factory, Dracula's castle and other exotic locations. As the player progresses through the stages, Kid Dracula recalls how to use certain powers. The player starts with a normal projectile attack which in later stages is expanded to increase the form and range of the projectile. Other learned abilities allow for alternative ways to traverse levels. These include the ability to reverse gravity and walk on the ceiling, the ability to briefly fly, and an umbrella for shielding against stage hazards. Kid Dracula can also create a bomb which can attack enemies as well as destroy some walls.

== Reception ==
Reception

Review scores
Publication	Score
Electronic Games	88%
Electronic Gaming Monthly	6/10, 7/10, 7/10, 5/10
Famicom Tsūshin	7/10, 5/10, 6/10, 6/10
GB Action	84%
Video Games & Computer Entertainment	9/10

Kid Dracula was released for the Game Boy in Japan on January 3, 1993. It was released in English-language audiences in North America in March 1993.

Faith Johnson of Retro Gamer described the critical reception was "mostly positive about Kid Dracula, even if they did not feel it was spectacular." Electronic Gaming Monthly reviewers ranged from lukewarm to dismissing the Kid Dracula. One reviewer found it to be one of the better Game Boy titles they've played while another said it was not revolutionary, it applied tried and true concepts well. One reviewers said the control and graphics were above average while a third said the bosses were cute, while a third reviewer said "I really like [Kid Dracula], even though he looks quite unusual." The last reviewer said the game was merely okay as it moved too slow to avoid the problem of blurring the action on the Game Boy's screen. Bill Kunkel, writing for Electronic Games, commented on this saying that scrolling action games frequently had these problems translating to the Game Boy, but that Kid Dracula overcame this with large, cleanly-drawn characters and simple and attractive props. Kunkel wen ton to compliment the games humor, characters and musical score.

In retrospective reviews, Johnson described Kid Dracula as "an enjoyable, if easy, game to play through" complimenting its soundtrack and graphics as excellent as well as the variety and good pacing to its levels.

== Legacy ==
Kid Dracula is an expensive game on the second-hand market. Johnson speculated that its high cost from re-sellers was due to a potential low print run of the original game or it not being seen as a must-own title on its release. The reviewer suggested to purchase the game through the Castlevania Anniversary Collection to avoid paying prices that ranged from £75 to over £300 for it.

== See also ==
- 1993 in video games
- List of Game Boy games
- List of Konami games
