= TwinBee (series) =

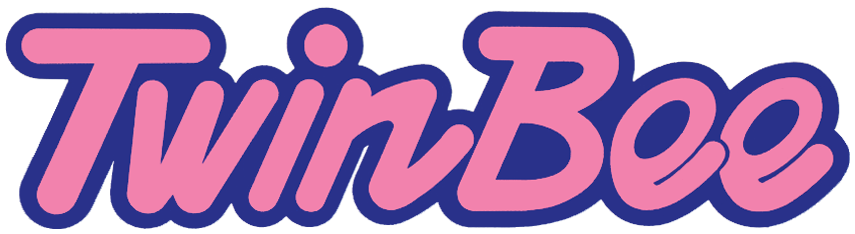
- Genre: Scrolling shooter
- Developers: Konami; Arika (3DS Classic)
- Publishers: Konami; Nintendo (3DS eShop)
- Platforms: Arcade, NES, MSX, Super NES, Game Boy, PlayStation, Saturn, PlayStation Portable, PC Engine, X68000, Game Boy Advance, Nintendo DS, mobile phones, i-Revo, iOS, Android, Wii
- First release: TwinBee; February 1985
- Latest release: Line GoGo! TwinBee; May 20, 2013

TwinBee (ツインビー) is a video game series composed primarily of cartoon-themed vertically scrolling shooter games produced by Konami that were released primarily in Japan. The series originated as an arcade video game simply titled TwinBee in 1985, followed by several home versions and sequels. The character designs of almost every game in the series since Detana!! TwinBee in 1991 were provided by Japanese animator Shuzilow HA (Jujiro Hamakawa), who also planned and supervised most of the subsequent installments in the TwinBee series. The series also inspired a radio drama adaptation that lasted three seasons in Japan, as well as an anime adaptation.

== History ==
The series centers around a blue bee-shaped anthropomorphic spacecraft named TwinBee, who is usually accompanied by a pink "female" counterpart known as WinBee. In most games, the first player controls TwinBee while WinBee is controlled by the second player. A third ship also exists named GwinBee, a green counterpart to TwinBee and WinBee who in most games serves as a power-up, but in some instances also appear as a third playable spacecraft. In contrast to the serious sci-fi theme of Konami's Gradius series, the TwinBee series is set in a cartoon-like world featuring several kinds of anthropomorphic creatures in addition to regular human characters. The player controls their spacecraft in most games shooting or punching at airborne enemies while throwing bombs at enemies on the ground, similarly to Namco's Xevious. The main power-ups in the TwinBee are yellow bells that the player can uncover by shooting at the floating clouds. The player must shoot these bells to keep them afloat and after shooting them a number of times, they will change colour, allowing the player to add new abilities to their spacecraft.

Despite being one of Konami's most prominent series in Japan during most of the 1990s, only a select few titles were localized for the foreign market, particularly the second console game Moero! TwinBee (which was released in America under the changed title Stinger); the two SNES installments, Pop'n TwinBee and Pop'n TwinBee: Rainbow Bell Adventures, in Europe and TwinBee Da!! for Game Boy, which was released in Europe as a standalone title with the name Pop'n TwinBee and later in compilations. The second arcade game, Detana!! TwinBee, also had a limited international release under the name of Bells & Whistles. The original arcade game was featured in the Nintendo DS compilation Konami Classics Series: Arcade Hits under the name RainbowBell (the European compilation, however, uses the original TwinBee name).

On June 6, 2025, Konami Amusement held the TwinBee Lottery, a lottery sale to commemorate the series' 40th anniversary. The lottery sale offered a chance to win TwinBee items featuring numerous original illustrations, as well as special E-amusement pass cards as bonus gifts.

== List of games ==
Release timeline
1985	TwinBee
1986	Moero TwinBee: Cinnamon-hakase o Sukue!
1987–1988
1989	TwinBee 3: Poko Poko Daimaō
1990	TwinBee Da!!
1991	Detana!! TwinBee
1992
1993	Pop'n TwinBee
1994	Pop'n TwinBee: Rainbow Bell Adventures
1994	TwinBee Taisen Puzzle-Dama
1995	TwinBee Yahho!
1996–1997
1998	TwinBee Paradise in Donburishima
1998	TwinBee RPG
1999–2001
2002	Pastel Jan
2003	Konami Suzume: TwinBee Taisen-ban
2004	TwinBee Dungeon
2005–2006
2007	TwinBee JG
2008–2012
2013	Line GoGo! TwinBee

- TwinBee, released on March 5, 1985: An original arcade vertical shooter, TwinBee plays similar to Namco's Xevious. Players use TwinBee or WinBee in a short string of six levels that repeats indefinitely, with a boss at the end of each. A Family Computer (Famicom) and an MSX version were made in 1986. The Famicom version was re-released for the Game Boy Advance under Nintendo's Famicom Mini label in Japan only. It was released in North America as part of an arcade compilation for Nintendo DS in March 2007, where it was renamed RainbowBell; when the compilation was released in Europe, the TwinBee name was restored.
  - TwinBee Deluxe, released on February 25, 2004: The mobile version just like a WinBee in a Deluxe game.
  - Mini Famicom: TwinBee, released on May 21, 2004: The Famicom version was re-released for Game Boy Advance as part of the Mini Famicom line.
  - 3D Classics: TwinBee, released on August 10, 2011: The game was also redone in 3D and released on the Nintendo eShop under Nintendo's 3D Classics line.
- Stinger, released on November 21, 1986 and in 1987 in America, is the first game in the TwinBee series that was released in North America. Some enemy force kidnaps Dr. Cinnamon (creator of the TwinBee ships) and TwinBee, WinBee and GwinBee must rescue him. The Japanese version for the Family Computer Disk System in 1986, this game allowed up to three players simultaneously. Unlike its predecessor, Stinger has horizontal shooter levels (like Gradius) in addition to the vertical ones. Since the Disk System extension was not released in North America, the American version was released as a cartridge, but it lost the three-player mode (only allowing for up to two players), the story scenes were removed and the difficulty was altered. Moero! TwinBee was re-released in cartridge format in 1993 with a new easy mode added.
- TwinBee 3: Poko Poko Daimaō, released on September 29, 1989, is the last game in the TwinBee series for the Famicom to be released and the third game in the series. It ditches Stinger's horizontal levels, which makes this more in line with the first title.
- Pop'n TwinBee, first released on October 12, 1990, in Japan and in autumn 1994 in Europe, the game is a sequel for the Game Boy to the original TwinBee. In Japan, it is known as TwinBee Da!!. Despite the European title, the Japanese version actually predates the release of the Super Famicom version of Pop'n TwinBee by three years. The game was re-released as part of Konami GB Collection Vol.2 in Japan, while a colorized version was released as part of Konami GB Collection Vol.3 in Europe. A full remake is featured in TwinBee Portable for PlayStation Portable.
- Detana!! TwinBee (also known as Bells & Whistles outside Japan), first released on February 21, 1991: An arcade release, also ported to the PC Engine (which was ported to Virtual Console), X68000, PlayStation and Saturn (the latter two bundled with TwinBee Yahho!). It has no relation to the original and Famicom games. While not too different from its predecessors, gameplay-wise, Detana! improves vastly on graphics and audio. It also introduces the current character cast, like TwinBee's and WinBee's characters (Light and Pastel, respectively) and other characters that would remain in the subsequent games. It was the most popular game in the series in Japan and paved the way for some merchandise products (including audio dramas and an original video animation). This also introduced cutscenes that played between stages, which usually showed Pastel and WinBee getting one up on Light and TwinBee.
- Pop'n TwinBee, first released on March 26, 1993, and later in 1993 in Europe: A SNES game, it is one of Detana!'s sequels, though they play differently. Pop uses a large energy bar, which results in game over if it depletes. When playing with two players, it is also possible to share energy.
- Pop'n TwinBee: Rainbow Bell Adventures (TwinBee: Rainbow Bell Adventure in Japan), released on January 7, 1994, in Japan and also in Europe during the same year. This SNES game meant the first real departure in the series. Rainbow Bell Adventures is a side-scrolling platformer. The game was also released in Europe, though the level order, some dialogue and the back-up system (the European version uses passwords, while the Japanese one uses battery) are different.
- TwinBee Taisen Puzzle-Dama published on December 9, 1994, in Japan. It is a puzzle video game for PlayStation; simple mechanics are part of a series of puzzle games Taisen Puzzle-Dama and takes its theme the world of TwinBee. The game was also planned to be released on the Saturn in 1995 before it was cancelled.
- TwinBee Yahho!, released on April 19, 1995:, is another sequel for Detana!, originally released in arcades, and later ported to the PlayStation and Saturn (along with Detana! TwinBee). The game included a vocal theme song, among other vocals, with WinBee greeting the arcade owner each time it is booted, and various snatches of dialogue from most of the characters, all voiced by the cast of TwinBee Paradise.
- Detana TwinBee Yahho! Deluxe Pack, a compilation released on September 29, 1995, in Japan for the PlayStation and subsequently ported to the Saturn, it contains Detana!! TwinBee and TwinBee Yahho!.
- TwinBee Paradise in Donburishima (ツインビーPARADISE in どんぶり島, Tsuinbī Paradaisu in Donburishima), released on February 26, 1998: More than a game, this is a CD-ROM with accessories inspired by the series (as a screensaver, etc.) for Windows 95.
- TwinBee RPG, released on April 3, 1998: Featuring 3D graphics and made for the PlayStation, this simplistic role playing game, set in the complete universe of the series, was the last stand-alone retail release in the series.
- Pastel Jan (パステルじゃん), released on 2002: A rock-paper-scissors video game for mobile phones.
- Konami Suzume 〜 TwinBee Taisen-ban 〜 (コナミ雀〜ツインビー対戦版〜), released on May 6, 2003: A mobile title that is part of Konami Taisen Colosseum (コナミ雀〜ツインビー対戦版〜)
- TwinBee Dungeon, released on May 14, 2004, is a roguelike dungeon RPG for cell phones themed on TwinBee universe which is part of the Mystery Dungeon series.
- TwinBee Portable, released on January 25, 2007 (Japan), is a PSP compilation featuring TwinBee, Detana!! TwinBee, Pop'n TwinBee, TwinBee Yahho!, and a remake of the Game Boy game TwinBee Da!.
- TwinBee JG Pachisuro, released in September 2007 (Japan): A TwinBee themed pachislot machine released by KPE, it is based on TwinBee Yahho! world.
- TwinBee no Bell Migaki, released on 2008 (Japan):
- Line GoGo! TwinBee, released on May 20, 2013, is a classic TwinBee shooter for iOS and Android developed by NAVER JAPAN and distributed by LINE GAME (LINE Corporation).

In 2022, during the Konami Action & Shooting Contest hosted by the Shueisha Game Creator's Camp and Tokyo Game Show, Ken Niimura won the rights from Konami to develop the game through the competition, and a game titled TwinBee Loop!: The Mystery of the Planet of Light and Darkness!! is in development.

=== Cancelled games ===
- TwinBee Miracle (PlayStation), 1996.

== Related media ==
=== Radio drama ===
A radio drama version of the series was produced following the release of Pop'n TwinBee for the Super Famicom titled TwinBee Paradise (ツインビーPARADISE), which began airing on the radio station NCB on October 10, 1993. The series lasted three seasons, with the third and final series concluding on March 30, 1997, comprising a total of 96 episodes, which were later released in drama CD collections.

TwinBee Paradise features the same cast of characters previously introduced in Detana!! TwinBee and Pop'n TwinBee. TwinBee Paradise further developed the fictional universe of the TwinBee and many story elements introduced in the series, including the names of TwinBee's and WinBee's pilots, Light and Pastel (who were originally nameless characters in the games), who were canonized in later video games such as TwinBee Yahho! and TwinBee RPG.

=== Anime ===
Two short anime films and an OVA mini-series based on the TwinBee were produced:

1. The first was TwinBee WinBee Hachibun-no-ichi Panic (ツインビー ウィンビーの1/8パニック, TwinBee and WinBee's 1/8 Panic), a short film released in 1994 released as a promotional tie-in to the Super Famicom game Rainbow Bell Adventure. It is sometimes shortened to Winbee's 1/8 Panic.
2. The second anime short, Tulip Kaigan Monogatari (チューリップ海岸物語, The Tulip Coast Story), was released in 1998 alongside the first short in a promotional tie-in to the subsequent OVA series. It is also alternatively titled Tulip Beach Stories.

The OVA series is titled TwinBee Paradise and is based on the radio drama of the same name. The OVA comprises three episodes, which were released individually on VHS and Laserdisc in 1999:

1. "Venus' Smile" (ヴィーナスの微笑み "Venus no Hohoemi")
2. "Midsummer Mirage" (真夏の蜃気楼（そのままじゃん）"Manatsu no Shinkirō (Sono Mama Jan)")
3. "Evil Revival" (悪よ復活せよ！ "Aku yo Fukkatsu seyo!")

=== Manga ===
- Four 1993 Comic Gamest supplements (volumes 85, 89, 93, and 97) contained manga of Detana! TwinBee drawn and written by Mine Yoshizaki. Between 1994 and 1996, an official manga, also by Yoshizaki, was published in three volumes in the collection Gamest Comics (numbers 011, 039 and 076).

=== Other manga ===
- In the Famicom Rocky manga, the first two games are based on the said chapter such as TwinBee in chapter 16 and Moero! TwinBee: Cinnamon Hakushi wo Sukue! in chapter 29.
- Famicom Ryu and Nekketsu! Famicom Shounendan were released in 1986 by Comic CoroCoro, as were these video games based on each chapter of the manga, including TwinBee's Famicom version.
- In the manga Warera Hobby's Famicom Seminar, TwinBee and TwinBee 3: Poko Poko Daimaō were adapted in each chapter, as this TwinBee character or enemies make a cameo in chapter 2, and Demon King Poko Poko appears in chapter 46.
- Moero! TwinBee: Cinnamon-hakase o Sukue!, the second game in the series, was based on chapter 16 of the manga Famitsu Comix: Shape of Happiness by Tamakichi Sakura.
- In the Rock 'n Game Boy manga, TwinBee Da!! was adapted in chapter 13 in volume 3.

== Appearances in other games ==
- The Goonies (Famicom version) allows to collect TwinBee as an item for 5,000 points.
- Gradius: The MSX version has a secret Twinbee cameo.
- Tokimeki Memorial features a shoot-'em-up mini game starring TwinBee.
- Tokimeki Memorial 2: A young man crossplays as Princess Melora.
- Battle Tryst: Pastel is an unlockable playable character in this fighting game.
- Konami Wai Wai World: TwinBee is one of two playable ships (Vic Viper being the other one) in the second to last stage, which is a generic vertical shooting stage.
- Wai Wai World 2: SOS!! Parsley Jō: TwinBee is a playable character in certain levels, but the levels in which he is playable are not just vertical shooting stages, but on-rails shooting stages in the vein of Space Harrier, as well.
- Hexion has sound clips from Detana!! Twinbee.
- Parodius series: In most of the series, TwinBee and WinBee made an appearance as playable characters, while Shooting Star (the enemy red ship in TwinBee Yahho!) is playable in Sexy Parodius. Also, while Parodius is more of a parody of Gradius, it features the bell powerup system in addition to the Gradius's bar system as well. Both systems works in parallel and give different powerups. Also, the bell system's powerups are temporary, while the bar system not.
- Ganbare Goemon 2: Kiteretsu Shōgun Magginesu: Pastel makes an appearance as an NPC in a house at the village which is visited at night.
- Snatcher: In the PlayStation and Saturn versions, Light and Pastel appear as clients at the Outer Heaven nightclub among other Konami characters.
- Konami Krazy Racers: Pastel is a playable character in this kart-racing game with Konami characters. Since Pastel is available from the beginning this game represents her first time as a primary-tier character. It is the second game released in United States with a TwinBee character. Also, different colored bells in this game have different powerups.
- Airforce Delta has Twinbee as a secret usable aircraft.
- DreamMix TV World Fighters: TwinBee is a playable character in this fighting game.
- Castlevania series: TwinBee makes an appearance as a secret item in Castlevania: Portrait of Ruin, Order of Ecclesia and Harmony of Despair.
- Otomedius: Twinbee characters appear in both Otomedius and Otomedius Excellent.
- Quiz Magic Academy 5: Getting the correct answer shows a bunch of bells and Twinbees flying.
- Bishi Bashi: One of the games in the series has Light and Pastel as playable characters.
- New LovePlus+ features a shoot-'em-up mini game starring TwinBee and WinBee.
- Kingdom Dragonion: TwinBee was a player character in this game.
- VS! Bomberman: TwinBee Characters, Light and Pastel was Costumes by Bomberman.
- Various entries in rhythm game franchises including Dance Dance Revolution, Beatmania IIDX, Pop'n Music, BeatStream, and Mirai da Gakki features remixes of songs from the games in Twinbee series.
- Konami Characore World
- Tokimeki Idol
- Pixel Puzzle Collection
- Bombergirl: Pastel appears as playable character.
- Super Bomberman R: One of the Dastardly Bombers eventually morphs into a Gwinbee boss.
- Contra Returns: TwinBee and WinBee appear as a Pet Spotlight.
- Power Pros: Pastel appears in the baseball 2014's mobile game Jikkyou Pawafuru Puroyakyu.
- Monster Retsuden Oreca Battle 2: TwinBee and Winbee appears as included monsters, where their evolved form as Prototype Twin-Bee resembles this characters.
