= Detana!! TwinBee =

1991 video game

- Japanese arcade flyer
- Developer: Konami
- Publisher: Konami
- Director: Masato Ohsawa
- Designers: Hiroyuki Ashida; K. Ishimoto; Ryouhei Shogaki
- Programmer: Toru Shimomura
- Artist: Shūjirō Hamakawa
- Composers: Hidenori Maezawa; Masae Nakashima; Michiru Yamane
- Series: TwinBee
- Platforms: Arcade, X68000, PC Engine
- Release: Arcade: JP: February 1991; EU: March 1991; X68000: JP: December 6, 1991; PC Engine: JP: February 26, 1992
- Genre: Scrolling shooter
- Modes: Single-player, multiplayer
- Arcade system: JAMMA

Detana!! TwinBee, (Note: Japanese: 出たな!! ツインビー, Hepburn: Detana!! TsuinBī; lit. "Here Comes TwinBee!!") released in Europe as Bells & Whistles, is a 1991 vertically scrolling shooter video game developed and published by Konami for arcades. It is the fifth entry in the TwinBee series and the second to be released for arcades following the original TwinBee (previous sequels were released directly to home consoles). Set several years after the events of TwinBee, players assume the role of Light and Pastel (marking their debut appearance) taking control of TwinBee and WinBee to defeat invading forces of the evil alien Iva and save planet Meru after receiving an SOS message sent by Princess Melora.

Detana!! TwinBee marked the debut of Japanese animator Shūjirō Hamakawa (credited under the pen name Shuzilow.Ha) as primary character designer for subsequent installments of the TwinBee series. The game proved popular among Japanese arcade players, earning several awards from Gamest magazine, while its ports to other platforms were also met with positive response from critics. A direct follow-up, Pop'n TwinBee, was released for the Super Nintendo Entertainment System in 1993.

== Gameplay ==
Arcade screenshot

Detana!! TwinBee is a vertically scrolling shooter game following the same conventions established in the original TwinBee, where players assume the role of Light and Pastel (whose names are given in the audio drama TwinBee Paradise) taking control of TwinBee (P1) and WinBee (P2) across seven levels to defeat invading forces of the evil alien Iva and save planet Meru after receiving an SOS message sent by Princess Melora.

The control configuration differs between regions; in the Japanese version, one button is used to fire the gun at airborne enemies while the other is used to drop bombs to the ground, while both buttons are used to do shoot and drop bombs at the same time in the European version. Holding down the shot button will cause a power-meter at the bottom of the screen to fill up, allowing the player to fire a "Big Shot" attack when releasing the button. Power-up items consist of bells which can be uncovered by shooting the floating clouds, as well as items uncovered by destroying land enemies. As with TwinBee, players can shoot the floating bells to change their colors. Besides the five different colors from the original TwinBee (yellow, white, blue, green, and red), two new bells are introduced: a purple bell that provides a "tail shield", activating barriers around the player's ship and a black bell that decreases speed of the ship.

Mini-bells and the lucky star from the first TwinBee return as well. GwinBee, a ship similar to TwinBee and WinBee also appears, allowing players to combine their ship with GwinBee to fire wider fire beams. Two players can also align their ships side by side to achieve the same effect or align their ships vertically for a powerful five-way spread. If both players align their ships with GwinBee between them, he will spring out and destroy all on-screen enemies. After the first loop is completed, players can replay it for a harder second loop. The game will be entirely over if the final stage is cleared again, but running out of lives results in a game over unless players insert more credits into the arcade machine to continue and receive a "free" power-up.

== Development ==
Detana!! TwinBee was created by most of the same team that worked on several projects at Konami such as the Gradius series, with director Masato Ohsawa leading its development and Toru Shimomura served as sole programmer of the game while Hiroshi Matsuura also served as engineer. Ryouhei Shogaki, Hiroyuki Ashida and K. Ishimoto acted as co-designers. The title marked the debut of Japanese animator Shūjirō Hamakawa (credited under the pseudonym Shuzilow.Ha) in his first project as game designer, serving as character illustrator for subsequent installments of the TwinBee series. Konami Kukeiha Club members Hidenori Maezawa, Masae Nakashima and Michiru Yamane scored the soundtrack. Yamane said that she wrote the music as colorful and fun to match the "cute bee world" of the project.

== Release ==
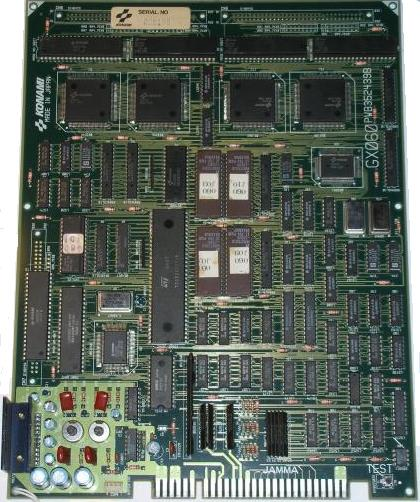
Detana!! TwinBee Arcade PCB

Detana!! TwinBee was first released by Konami in 1991 for arcades in Japan in February and Europe in March as Bells & Whistles. The game was first ported to the X68000 computer on December 6, 1991. The title was then ported to the PC Engine on February 28, 1992. This conversion is notable for being one of the earliest works of Koji Igarashi at Konami, serving as enemy programmer. In September 1995, it was included as part of the Detana TwinBee Yahho! Deluxe Pack compilation for Sega Saturn and PlayStation.

Detana!! TwinBee was later ported to Japanese mobile phone platforms such as EZweb, i-mode and Yahoo Mobile on July 13, 2004. The game was included as part of the TwinBee Portable collection for PlayStation Portable in January 2007 and later re-released as a budget title under the "Konami The Best" line on March 13, 2008. The PC Engine conversion was re-released for the Wii's Virtual Console as a "Hanabi Festival" launch in Japan on September 18, 2007, then in North America on March 23, 2009, and later in PAL territories on July 24 of the same year. The PC Engine version was then re-released for the PlayStation Network as part of the "PC Engine Archives" line in Japan on June 16, 2010. The arcade original was included on the Game Room gaming service for Microsoft Windows and Xbox 360 as part of "Game Pack 012" in November 2010. The PC Engine port was later added to the PC Engine GameBox app for iOS in Japan on February 12, 2014. In addition, the PC Engine version was also re-released in Japan for Windows through D4 Enterprise's Project EGG digital service on March 3 of the same year.

Detana!! TwinBee was re-released in its PC Engine form between April and May 2014 across cloud gaming services like Smart TV Box, G-cluster and Hikari TV. The PC Engine conversion was eventually re-released only in Japan for the Wii U's Virtual Console on November 24, 2014. Hamster Corporation re-released the arcade version as part of their Arcade Archives series for the Nintendo Switch and PlayStation 4 on January 16, 2020.

== Reception and legacy ==
Reception

Review scores
Publication	Score
AllGame	(PCE) 3/5
Consoles +	(PCE) 95%
Computer and Video Games	(PCE) 88%
Eurogamer	(VC) 6/10
Famitsu	(PCE) 24/40
IGN	(VC) 7.5/10
Nintendo Life	(VC) 8/10

Awards
Publication	Award
Oh!X (1993)	#3 1991年度Oh!X Game of the Year (X68K)
Gamest Mook (1998)	Grand Prize 3rd, Best Shooting Award 1st, Best Graphic Award 4th, Best VGM Award 3rd, Player Popularity 5th, Annual Hit Game 8th (AC)

In Japan, Game Machine listed Detana!! TwinBee as the third most popular arcade game of March 1991, while Micom BASIC Magazine listed it as the sixth most popular game of May 1991. Both Martin Gaksch and Heinrich Lenhardt of German magazine Power Play regarded the game to be a nice vertical-scrolling shooter with enjoyable candy-colored visuals. Maurizio Miccoli of Italian magazine Computer+Videogiochi gave the title a positive outlook. Gamest gave it several awards for the 5th Gamest Grand Prize (1991), winning 3rd place in the Grand Prize, 1st place in the Best Shooting Award, 4th place in the Best Graphic Award, 3rd place in the Best VGM Award, 5th place in Player Popularity and 8th place in the Annual Hit Game. Nishikawa Zenji of Japanese magazine Oh!X applauded the X68000 conversion for its arcade-accurate graphics and sound, among other aspects. This version also proved popular among the X68000 userbase, eventually being nominated for a "Game of the Year" award by Oh!X but losing against other titles such as Parodius Da!.

The PC Engine port received positive reception from critics who reviewed it as an import title. Public reception was also positive: readers of PC Engine Fan voted to give Detana!! TwinBee a 24.79 out of 30 score, ranking at the number 19 spot in a poll, indicating a large popular following. Both Kaneda Kun and François Hermellin of Consoles + praised the PC Engine conversion for its colorful graphics, sympathetic music and impeccable gameplay but criticized the presentation. Four reviewers of Famitsu gave the PC Engine version a score of 24 out of 40. Computer and Video Games's Frank O'Connor commended the PC Engine port for its arcade-accurate presentation and gameplay but criticized the music for being annoying. AllGame's Kyle Knight gave positive remarks to the imaginative boss designs and enjoyable gameplay but noted the audio design to be a mixed point on the PC Engine release. Olivier Prézeau of Joypad and Joystick's Jean-Marc Demoly praised the PC Engine port for its graphics, sound and controls as well.

Reviewing the Virtual Console re-release, Nintendo Life's Corbie Dillard praised its responsive controls, arcade-accurate visuals and upbeat soundtrack. IGN's Lucas M. Thomas commended its anime-inspired world and co-op play feature. Eurogamer's Dan Whitehead compared it with Xevious, stating it was not as good as MUSHA nor as cute as Fantasy Zone but regarded it as an appealing vertical-scrolling shooter for casual players.

A clone of Detana!! TwinBee for the Amiga titled Gunbee F-99 was published as a covermount alongside the December 1998 issue of Amiga Format magazine.
