= Antarctic Adventure =

1983 video game

- Family Computer cover art
- Developer: Konami
- Publisher: Konami
- Platforms: MSX; Family Computer; ColecoVision; Game Boy (in Konami GB Collection Vol.3, Japan); Game Boy Color (in Konami GB Collection Vol.4, Europe); Mobile phone EGG Project; Handheld
- Release: MSX; JP: December 1983; EU: 1984; ColecoVision; NA: 1984; Family Computer; JP: April 22, 1985; Mobile phones; JP: 2001?; JP: 2002 (J-SKY version); JP: 2003 (Konami Net DX); i-Revo; JP: June 16, 2006; Windows; JP: November 25, 2014 (as EGG Project)
- Genres: Racing, platform
- Modes: Single-player, multiplayer

Antarctic Adventure (けっきょく南極大冒険, Kekkyoku Nankyoku Daibōken; lit. "Actually Antarctic Big Adventure") is a video game developed by Konami in 1983 for the MSX, and later for video game consoles, such as the Family Computer and ColecoVision. The player takes the role of an Antarctic penguin, racing to various research stations owned by different countries in Antarctica (excluding the USSR).

The gameplay is similar to Sega's Turbo, but plays at a much slower pace, and features platform game elements. The penguin, later named Penta, must reach the next station before time runs out while avoiding sea lions and breaks in the ice. Throughout the levels, fish jump out of ice holes and can be caught for bonus points. The game, like many early video games, has no ending – when the player reaches the last station, the game starts from the first level again, but with increased difficulty.

== Legacy ==
Antarctic Adventure was followed by a sequel for the MSX computer in 1986, entitled Penguin Adventure. In addition, the penguin character Penta, and his son Pentarou became a mascot for Konami through the 1980s. They have made appearances in over 10 games. Of particular note are his appearances in the Parodius series of shoot 'em up games.

Penta, or his son Pentarou, had appeared in Medal Games like Tsurikko Penta, Balloon Penta and Imo Hori Penta. Following in 2002 (not released for mobile in 2001), three mobile games Kekkyo ku Nankyoku choi bōken (けっきょく南極ちょい冒険), were released on May 6, 2003, another titled Kekkyoku Nankyoku Daibōken Taisen-ban (けっきょく南極大冒険対戦版), as part of Konami Taisen Colosseum, and the fishing game as Penta no Tsuri Boken, released for i-Revo.

A screenshot from this game can briefly be seen in the introduction of Gradius ReBirth, released in 2008 for the Wii Virtual Console and in 2014 for the Wii U Virtual Console. An MSX Version was re-released for the Windows Store as part of EGG Project in November 2014 in Japan.

In 1990, Konami released only in Japan a handheld electronic game of Antarctic Adventure, although it is usually listed as South Pole (a more literal translation of the Japanese title).

In 2014, Antarctic Adventure was released on a special version of the ColecoVision Flashback by AtGames, available only through Dollar General stores.

In other games, Pentarou appears as a fisherman.

== Soundtrack ==
The music that plays in each level is "The Skaters' Waltz" by Émile Waldteufel.

== See also ==
- Parodius – game series which also features Pentarou.
