= Getsu Fūma Den =

1987 video game

- Famicom box art
- Developer: Konami
- Publisher: Konami
- Composer: Hidenori Maezawa
- Platform: Family Computer
- Release: JP: July 7, 1987
- Genre: Action role-playing
- Mode: Single-player

Getsu Fūma Den (Note: Japanese: 月風魔伝(げつふうまでん); lit. "The Legend of Getsu Fūma") is a 1987 action role-playing game developed and published by Konami for the Famicom exclusively in Japan. It has been referenced in many subsequent Konami titles throughout the years. The game is structurally similar to Castlevania II: Simon's Quest, The Goonies II and Teenage Mutant Ninja Turtles (NES).

A hack-and-slash "roguevania" sequel, titled Getsu Fūma Den: Undying Moon, was released on the Nintendo Switch on February 9, 2022 and left Early Access on Steam on February 17. Another sequel titled Shin Getsu Fūma Den was planned for the PlayStation 2, but was cancelled.

== Gameplay ==
Getsu Fuma Den is a side-scroliing action role-playing game. The player controls Fūma, whose goal is to locate the three Pulse Blades that have been stolen from his clan in order to gain access to Ryūkotsuki's lair. Each of the Pulse Blades have been hidden away in the three neighboring islands surrounding Kyōki-tō, which are Kigan-tō (鬼顔島; "Ogre Face Island"), Gokumon-tō (獄門島; "Prison Gate Island") and Mitsukubi-tō (三首島; "Three Necks Island"). Each of these islands requires Fūma to be in possession of a different Devil Mask (鬼面符, Kimenfu).

The game starts off from an overhead view where the player guides Fūma to his next destination. When Fūma enters a gate, the game switches to a side-scrolling action scene where the player must go from one end of the area to the next while fending off enemies and avoiding pitfalls in the usual matter in order to return to the main field and proceed to the next scene. In addition to these action scenes, there are also small shrines featuring villagers who will provide hints to Fūma and shops where he can purchase new items and weapons using the money he has accumulated from defeated enemies. The player switches items by pausing the game during an action sequence and then pressing A to select a defensive item or B to change weapons. Experience points are accumulated by defeating enemies, which will fill out Fūma's sword gauge, increasing the strength of his attacks.

When the player reaches the main dungeon in each of the islands, the game switches to a pseudo-3D perspective which follows Fūma from behind. The player must proceed through a labyrinth in order to reach the boss holding one of the Pulse Swords. Each labyrinth is filled with numerous enemies who will confront Fūma, along with allies who will provide him with hints and helpful items. A candle is required to light these labyrinths, as well as a compass which shows Fūma's current direction. When the player reaches the boss's lair, the game switches back to a side-scrolling perspective before the actual confrontation.

The game uses a lives system like most action games. The player loses a life when he runs out of health or falls into a pitfall. When the player runs out of lives, they can continue from where they left off or quit and resume at a later point using a password. The player is penalized by having their money reduced by half.

== Plot ==
In the distant future of 14672 A.D., the first year of the Demon Age (魔暦元年, Mareki Gan-nen), the demon lord Ryūkotsuki (龍骨鬼) escaped from hell and plotted to conquer the surface world ruled by the three Getsu brothers (月氏三兄弟, Getsu-shi San Kyōdai). The Getsu brothers fought against Ryūkotsuki, each wielding one of the three spiritual Pulse Blades (波動剣, Hadōken) that have been passed within the clan for generations. However, the brothers were ultimately defeated by the demon and only Fūma (風魔), the youngest of the three, survived. Vowing to avenge his slain brothers, Fūma ventures into Kyōki-tō (狂鬼島, Mad Demon Island) to recover the three stolen Pulse Blades and summon the spirits of his brothers to defeat Ryūkotsuki.

== Reception ==
Reception

Review scores
Publication	Score
Famitsu	29/40
Beep	3/5
Family Computer Magazine	22.39/30
Yuge	Positive

Getsu Fūma Den was met with mostly positive reception from critics. Famitsu noted its mixture of elements from both The Adventure of Link and Dragon Buster, with one reviewer stating that it feels like a sequel to Akumajō Dracula. Family Computer Magazine wrote that the game evoked "a surprising and mysterious" atmosphere. A writer for Japanese gaming magazine Yuge commended its graphics, direction and music.

Hardcore Gaming 101's Kurt Kalata commended the varied visuals and music but criticized the controls and pseudo-3D dungeon crawling sequences for being tedious. In contrast, the Japanese book 200 Unreasonable Famicom & Sufami Games You Want to Clear Before You Die gave the game a negative retrospective outlook. While similarities with Genpei Tōma Den were pointed out and the overall originality on-display was also commended, they heavily criticized the password system and drawbacks with its gameplay.
