= Kid Dracula (1990 video game) =

- Japanese box art
- Developer: Konami
- Publisher: Konami
- Director: Shiro Murata
- Programmers: Shiro Murata; Huuko Eriko; Yasuhiro Yamamoto
- Artists: Yoichi Yoshimoto; Kenji Fujioka; Kazunori Yana
- Composers: Shinji Tasaka; Satoko Miyawaki
- Series: Castlevania
- Platforms: Famicom, mobile phone
- Release: Famicom: JP: 19 October 1990; Mobile phones: JP: 30 June 2006; Castlevania Anniversary Collection: WW: May 16, 2019
- Genre: Platform
- Mode: Single-player

Akumajō Special: Boku Dracula-kun (Note: Japanese: 悪魔城すぺしゃる ぼくドラキュラくん, Hepburn: Akumajō Supesharu: Boku Dorakyura-kun; transl. "Demon Castle Special: Kid Dracula") is a 1990 platform game released by Konami in Japan for the Famicom. It is considered a parody of the Castlevania series. A version for mobile phones was released on 30 June 2006 in Japan.

The game saw ports for the PlayStation 4, Xbox One, Nintendo Switch, and Microsoft Windows as part of the Castlevania Anniversary Collection which was released digitally on May 16, 2019, in all regions, with an English localization as Kid Dracula.

== Plot ==
The self-proclaimed Demon King, Kid Dracula, has awoken from a long sleep, only to discover that the demon Galamoth has challenged him. Swiping his father's cape, it is up to Kid Dracula to set out on an adventure to destroy the monster, and retake his throne. After battling through dangers and demons, Kid Dracula defeats Galamoth. This causes him to become famous throughout the land, with all the monsters in Transylvania showing up at his castle wanting to be his friend.

== Audio ==
The soundtrack Konami Famicom Music Memorial Best Vol. 3, released on February 21, 1991, contains the soundtrack for Akumajō Special: Boku Dracula-kun, Ai Senshi Nicol and Wai Wai World 2: SOS! Parsley Castle. The music was composed by Konami Kukeiha Club.

A soundtrack album, Akumajo Special: Boku Dracula-kun Soundtracks was released by EGG Music, a division of D4 Enterprise, on August 14, 2014. It contains every background music and bonus track from the game, which were composed by Konami Kukeiha Club (by Satoko Miyawaki and Shinji Tasaka).

== Reception ==
On release, Famitsu magazine scored the game a 25 out of 40.

== Legacy ==
Konami would develop and publish a sequel titled Kid Dracula for the Game Boy in 1993. Faith Johnson of Retro Gamer said that the 1993 game felt more like a remake or reimagining of Kid Dracula due to it having many levels that are similar in nature.

Marchan reappears as a logical image nonogram in Picross S: Konami Antiques Edition, in addition to including Kid Dracula as the latter.
