= Parodius (1990 video game) =

Parodius! From Myth to Laughter
- European NES box art
- Developer: Konami
- Publisher: Konami
- Series: Parodius
- Platform: Arcade: Famicom/NES, Game Boy, PC Engine, PlayStation, Sega Saturn, Super NES, X68000, mobile phone
- Release: February 1990: Arcade; JP: February 1990; EU: 1990 Famicom/NES; JP: November 30, 1990; EU: 1992 Game Boy; JP: April 5, 1991; EU: 1992 X68000; JP: April 19, 1991 PC Engine; JP: February 21, 1992 Super NES; JP: July 3, 1992; EU: 1992; JP: September 30, 1997 (Nintendo Power) PlayStation; JP: December 3, 1994; EU: 1996; JP: March 20, 1997 (PlayStation the Best); JP: November 20, 2003 (PSone Books) Saturn; JP: May 19, 1995; EU: 1996 Mobile; JP: February 19, 2003; JP: February 18, 2004 (Vodafone); JP: 2004 (Konami Net DX, as Parodius Da! DX (パロディウスだ! 豪華版, Parodiusu da! Gōka-ban)) PlayStation Portable; JP: January 25, 2007
- Genre: Scrolling shooter
- Modes: Single-player, multiplayer

Parodius! From Myth to Laughter, released in Japan as Parodius Da! Shinwa kara Owarai e (Note: Japanese: パロディウスだ! －神話からお笑いへ－, Hepburn: Parodiusu Da! Shinwa kara Owarai e; lit. "It's Parodius! From Myth to Laughter") and outside Japan as Parodius (from "Parody Gradius"), is a shoot 'em up arcade video game and the second title in the Parodius series produced by Konami. The European SNES, Sega Saturn and PlayStation versions are also known as Parodius: Non-Sense Fantasy. The gameplay is stylistically very similar to the Gradius series, but the graphics and music are intentionally absurd.

As a result of its localised title, From Myth to Laughter is often mistaken as the original game of the series. The lesser known original game, Parodius: The Octopus Saves the Earth, was released for the MSX computer in Japan.

== Story ==
The Great Octopus has threatened Earth. To help Parodius save the planet, you and his friends must begin your search for the truth. As you search the whole world over you must find the enemy and you must destroy him.

== Gameplay ==
In-game screenshot, with the player (Vic Viper) fighting Honey Mikayo

As stated above, gameplay is very similar to the Gradius series with a few differences. The first difference is that Parodius retains the selection of different weapons configurations but implements it via four different characters: Vic Viper (from Gradius), Octopus, TwinBee, and Pentarou. The second main difference is the addition of bell power-ups, from the TwinBee series. These bells act as one-time power-ups, allowing the player to destroy every enemy on screen, fire huge beams of energy, etc. Enemies and environments from the Gradius games and TwinBee are mixed in along with a host of anime-style opponents, including scantily-clad women. All of the Gradius elements are integrated in a light-hearted fashion. The Big Core, a regular boss within the Gradius series, is given a neon look and is called "Viva Core". Moreover, there is a moai (Easter Island head statues) level, but all of the statues are given a much more animated look. The boss of that level, Yoshiko, fires other moai at the player by spitting them out of her mouth. The final boss, in typical Gradius fashion, is an unarmed enemy that once defeated results in a destruction/escape sequence.

=== Characters and weapons ===
Vic Viper – Traditional Gradius configuration
The missile will fall to the ground, and then move along until it encounters an enemy. The Double mode will fire two blasts, one forward, and one at an incline forty-five degrees above. The Laser mode is a thin blue laser, identical to the one in Gradius.

Octopus – Salamander configuration
This configuration is identical to the weapons presented in the Salamander arcade game. The missile is '2-way' that yields two bomb-like explosives that fall both up and down. The Double is the tail gun present in the second configuration, and the laser is the ripple laser, which fires expanding concentric circles at the front of the craft/person.

TwinBee (Colored as Winbee) – TwinBee configuration
This set is the weapons from the vertically scrolling TwinBee, applied to horizontal gameplay. The missile is now the rocket punch, which has a larger impact area than the standard missile. The double is the same tail gun from the Octopus/Salamander configuration. The laser is a 3-way gun which fires shots the same size as the Double and standard weapons.

- Due to the color bug, it could be considered that Winbee, rather than TwinBee, has the most appearances in video games, however this TwinBee does not have the same cockpit windshield design as either TwinBee, Winbee or Gwinbee.

Pentarou – Gradius II: Gofer's Ambition configuration
This set is almost identical to one of the power meter sets in Gradius II: Gofer's Ambition. The missile is the photon torpedo (spelled in-game as "Poton") that fires one missile that travels along the bottom ground and penetrates multiple enemies. The Double mode will fire two blasts, one forward, and one at an incline forty-five degrees above. The laser mode is different from the one in Gradius II; instead of a ripple laser analog, it fires bullets that create small explosions upon impact.

=== Stages ===
Below is a listing of the stages from the original version:

- The first stage is a pirate-themed, earth-like planet. The music is a remix of "Thunder & Lightning" polka by Johann Strauss II. The music during Cat Battleship is a remix of the final part of "Symphony No. 9" by Ludwig van Beethoven, and the music during the boss fight against Captain Penguinovski the 3rd is a remix of "Flight of the Bumblebee" by Nikolai Rimsky-Korsakov.
- The second stage is a Las Vegas-themed and circus-themed planet. The music is a remix of "Piano Concerto No. 1" and "Dance of the Reed Pipes" by Pyotr Ilyich Tchaikovsky. The music during Chichibinta Rika is a remix of "The Final Enemy" from Gradius II, and the music during the boss fight against Eagle Eagle Sabnosuke is a remix of the final boss theme from Gradius II.
- The third stage is a recreation of a floating candy fortress in space. The music is a remix of "Trepak" by Pyotr Ilyich Tchaikovsky, followed by "William Tell Overture" by Gioachino Rossini. During boss fight against Hot Lips, the music is a remix of "Can-can" by Offenbach.
- The fourth stage is a Japanese-themed volcanic planet. The music is a remix of "Sabre Dance" by Aram Khachaturian (Russian folk song "Kalinka" by Ivan Larionov and "Hungarian Dances" by Johannes Brahms in the PSP version). The music during the boss battle against Pig Tide is a remix of Japanese folk song "Yagibushi".
- The fifth stage is a Moai battleship. The music is a remix of "L'Arlésienne Suite No. 2, Farandole" by Georges Bizet, followed by "The Old Stone Age" from Gradius series. The boss fight against Yoshiko uses "Flight of the Bumblebee" as its music.
- The sixth stage is a pinball planet. The music is a remix of "Gunkan March" by Tōkichi Setoguchi. During the boss against Viva Core, a remix of "Aircraft Carrier" from the Gradius series plays.
- The seventh stage is a planet that full of pink clouds, beautiful girls, and bubbles. The music is a remix of "Waltz of the Flowers" by Pyotr Ilyich Tchaikovsky. The music for the boss, Honey Mikayo, is a remix of "Flight of the Bumblebee".
- The eighth stage is a strange, alien, ice cavern planet. The music is a remix of "Violin Concerto, Op. 64" by Felix Mendelssohn and "Under the Double Eagle" by Josef Franz Wagner. The boss is Pooyan (a giant pufferfish), and the music is a remix of "Flight of the Bumblebee".
- The ninth stage is a graveyard planet full of ghosts from Japanese and Egyptian folklore, and contains a lava lake. The music is a remix of "In the Hall of the Mountain King" by Edvard Grieg and "Swan Lake". The boss fight against Iron Maiden MK III uses the final part of Beethoven's "Symphony No. 9", and the boss fight against Yoshiwara Dayuu with ash clouds uses a remix of "William Tell's Storm" by Gioachino Rossini.
- The tenth and final stage is Zeo's fortress in the unknown planet. The music is the final stage theme from Gradius II, and the final boss theme is "Aircraft Carrier" from Gradius II.

=== Bosses ===
Below is a list of the bosses from the original version:

- Cat Battleship
- Captain Penguinovski the 3rd
- Chichibinta Rika
- Eagle Eagle Sabnosuke
- Hot Lips
- Pig Tide
- Yoshiko
- Viva Core
- Honey Mikayo
- Pooyan
- Iron Maiden MK III
- Yoshiwara Dayuu
- Showering Beauty
- Golgotha Takobee

The platform-exclusive bosses include Penguin Conducter, Madam of Yotsuya Q, Viking Moai, Woon Botton, Crystal Golem, Marvelous Green Mantle, Great Gourmet King Manjiri Kun, Super DX Emperor Penguin, Tako Hyuuma, Penguin Bomb.

The NES version replaces Chichibinta Rika with Miss Mishitarina, and Honey Mikayo does not appear within the game at all despite appearing on the European NES cover.

Hot Lips, Pig Tide, Honey Mikayo, Iron Maiden MK III and Yoshiwara Dayuu do not appear in the Mobile version.

== Music ==
Parodius da! -Shinwa kara Owarai he-

Soundtrack album by Konami Kukeiha Club
- Released: July 20, 1990
- Recorded: 1990
- Genre: Video game soundtrack
- Length: 47:07
- Label: King Records

- The soundtrack was produced by Konami Kukeiha Club and released by King Records on July 21, 1990 in Japan. It was also reprinted on September 23, 1998.
- A CD Arrangement was released on June 21, 1991.
- A Ending Music for Parodius for Game Boy Version was a part of Konami Ending Collection, which was released for CD Soundtrack on October 21, 1991.
- In addition, disc 4 of Konami Music Masterpiece Collection, which was released on October 1, 2004, is devoted to this game.

== Ports ==
Parodius has been ported to a number of platforms, most notably the Super Famicom (released on the SNES in Europe) and the PC Engine. The game was also ported to the Family Computer (released on the NES in Europe) with several stages omitted but with a new amusement park stage as well as several hidden bonus stages. Most recently the game, along with several other Gradius titles, has been ported to Java-based cell phones in Japan.

The Game Boy version (which was also released in Europe) shows the ages of the playable characters, and only has 8 stages, which include stages 1–6, and 10 from the arcade game. Stage 3 was moved to Stage 4. The Game Boy version of stage 3 also has a hidden stage. This version was also re-released in color as part of Konami GB Collection Vol.2.

There was also a Japan-exclusive port for the X68000.

The PC Engine version does not have the arcade Stages 5 and 8, but features a stage titled SPECIAL and a new introduction that features several strange-looking Japanese characters. This is in contrast to the arcade intro, which chronicles the Gradius legacy up until the time of release.

The SFC/SNES version added the bath house and "Omake" stages over the arcade version. In the "Omake" stage, the player immediately continues after dying, instead of at a checkpoint. The PAL version of the SNES port was titled Parodius: Non-Sense Fantasy and "Omake" was retitled "Lollipop".

The Mobile phone version titled Parodius! Deluxe Edition (パロディウスだ! 豪華版, Parodiusu da! Gōka-ban?) was released in 2003 in Japan, and does not have the arcade Stages 3, 4, 7, 8 and 9.

Parodius was also ported along with its sequel Fantastic Parodius - Pursue the Glory of the Past on the compilation also simply titled Gokujou Parodius Da! Deluxe Pack in Japan and Parodius in Europe for PlayStation in 1994 and Sega Saturn in 1995 and in Parodius Portable for PlayStation Portable in 2007.

== Reception ==
Reception

Review scores
| Publication | Score | |
| Publication | Game Boy | SNES |
|---|---|---|
| Famitsu | 6/10, 8/10, 8/10, 5/10 | |
| Mean Machines | | 93% |

In Japan, Game Machine listed Parodius! From Myth to Laughter on their June 1, 1990 issue as being the seventh most-successful table arcade unit of the month. It went on to be one of the top five highest-grossing arcade games of 1990 in Japan, where it also won the 1990 Gamest Awards for Best Production and Best Shooting Game. In 1996, Super Play ranked the game 93rd on their Top 100 SNES Games of All Time. The described the game as "Gradius on hallucinogens."

Mean Machines magazine gave the Super NES version a positive review, giving it a 93% score. Computer and Video Games gave the SNES version an 88% score, and the PlayStation version an 85% score. Power Unlimited gave the SNES version a score of 82% writing: "Konami pokes fun at its own games in Parodius. Fortunately, they have not forgotten the gameplay, because it is to die for. It doesn't get boring quickly, partly thanks to the craziest music and images you've ever found in a game." Consoles + gave the PC Engine version a score of 90% and called it an addictive and superbly made game.
