= Parodius =

- Genres: Cute 'em up, turn-based strategy
- Developer: Konami
- Publisher: Konami
- Platforms: Arcade, Famicom, Game Boy, Game Boy Color, Mobile, MSX, PC Engine, PlayStation, PlayStation Portable, Sega Saturn, Super Famicom, X68000
- First release: Parodius: The Octopus Saves the Earth; April 28, 1988
- Latest release: Paro Wars; September 25, 1997

Parodius (Note: Japanese: パロディウス, Hepburn: Parodiusu) is a series of cute 'em ups developed and published by Konami. The games are tongue-in-cheek parodies of Gradius, and also feature characters from many other Konami franchises.

== Video games ==
There are six games in the Parodius series. The last of them, Paro Wars, is a spin-off strategy game.

The only games released outside Japan are From Myth to Laughter and Fantastic Journey, which received European localizations. None of them were released in the Americas.

Parodius games have been ported to several different platforms, including arcade machines, mobile phones, and home consoles.

Year	International title	Transcribed Japanese title	Original platform
1988	Parodius: The Octopus Saves the Earth	Parodiusu: Tako wa Chikyū o Sukuu	MSX
1990	Parodius! From Myth to Laughter	Parodiusu Da! Shinwa kara Owarai	Arcade
1994	Fantastic Journey	Gokujō Parodiusu - Kako no Eikō o Motomete	Arcade
1995	Jikkyō Oshaberi Parodius	Jikkyō Oshaberi Parodiusu	Super Famicom
1996	Sexy Parodius	Sekushī Parodiusu	Arcade
1997	Paro Wars	Parowōzu	PlayStation

=== Compilations ===
Year	International title	Transcribed Japanese title	Games included	Platforms
1994	Parodius	Gokujō Parodiusuda! Derakkusupakku	From Myth to Laughter; Fantastic Journey	Sega Saturn; PlayStation
2007	Parodius Portable	Parodiusu Pōtaburu	All except for Paro Wars	PSP

== Pachinko machines ==
In addition to the video games, a number of Parodius-themed pachinko mechanical games have been released in Japan:

- Little Pirates (1998)
- CR Parodius Da! EX (2000)
- CR Parodius Da! ZE (2000)
- CR Parodius Da! 2 (2000)
- CR Saikoro Chindōchū (2004)
- CR Gokujō Parodius! (2006)
- Gokuraku Parodius (2010)
- Gokuraku Parodius A (2010)

== See also ==
- Air Zonk and Super Air Zonk, colorful shooter games by Hudson Soft starring its mascot character
- Harmful Park, a PlayStation game similar to Parodius
- Otomedius, another series of parody shooters by Konami
- Space Invaders '95, a cartoonish parody of Space Invaders
- Star Parodier, a game by Hudson Soft that follows a similar concept
- TwinBee, a cartoon-themed series of shooters by Konami
