= Castlevania (disambiguation) =

Castlevania is a video game series, created and developed by Konami.

Castlevania may also refer to:

== Video games ==
- Castlevania (1986 video game), the first game in the video game series
- Castlevania (1999 video game), the Nintendo 64 game
- Castlevania: Circle of the Moon, a Game Boy Advance game called Castlevania in Europe
- Castlevania: Lament of Innocence, a PlayStation 2 game called Castlevania in Europe and Japan

== Film and television ==
- Castlevania, a cancelled film by Sylvain White based on the video game
- Castlevania (TV series), an animated series by Netflix

== Music ==
- "Castlevania", a song by Valery Kipelov and Sergey Mavrin from the album Smutnoye Vremia
- Le Castle Vania, an electronic music project from Atlanta, Georgia

== See also ==
- Castlemania, a 2011 album by Thee Oh Sees
