= Castlevania: Legacy of Darkness =

1999 video game

- North American box art
- Developer: Konami Computer Entertainment Kobe
- Publisher: Konami
- Director: Yuji Shibata
- Producer: Etsunobu Ebisu
- Writers: Takeo Yakushiji; Koichi Yagi
- Composer: Masahiko Kimura
- Series: Castlevania
- Platform: Nintendo 64
- Release: NA: December 8, 1999; JP: December 25, 1999; EU: March 3, 2000
- Genres: Action-adventure, platform
- Mode: Single-player

Castlevania: Legacy of Darkness (Note: Known in Japan as Akumajō Dracula: Mokushiroku Gaiden − Legend of Cornell (悪(あく)魔(ま)城(じょう)ドラキュラ黙(もく)示(し)録(ろく) 外(がい)伝(でん) 〜レジェンド オブ コーネル〜, Akumajō Dorakyura Mokushiroku Gaiden ~Rejendo obu Kōneru~; Demon Castle Dracula Apocalypse: Side Story − Legend of Cornell)) is a 1999 action-adventure game developed and published by Konami for the Nintendo 64. A prequel and expanded version of Castlevania (Nintendo 64), also released earlier in the year on the same platform, it contains a revision of the original game with improved graphics, added villains, and alternate versions of some levels.

== Gameplay ==
Cornell can transform into a werewolf and use his claws to attack. Legacy of Darkness features 3D gameplay.

A large part of the game's challenge is based on jumping from platform to platform while avoiding environmental hazards, such as enemies and traps. Platforms are usually stationary, but some may rotate out from under the player, move through the environment like a rail shooter, and crumble or fall away underfoot. There are some invisible platforms that either afford players a strategic advantage or lead to hidden items.

Castlevania includes elements from the survival horror game genre. In addition to the trappings and narrative devices of Gothic horror, players are often placed in situations that evoke feelings of stress, anxiety, and vulnerability. Players may be trapped in caged fights with monsters, such as the battle with the Cerberus hounds in the Villa when the screen darkens to near-black. Some caged battles are timed, such as the boss battles in the Duel Tower level, where the player will be crushed by a falling ceiling should they not best their enemy in time. Vampires are often fought in caged environments, with the added complication that they can latch onto Carrie, Cornell, Henry and Reinhardt to suck their blood. If the player does not break free by rapidly rotating the control stick, the character's status changes to "vamp" and they will not be able to use their primary weapon or healing items. Unless a specific item is used to recover, the game becomes exponentially more challenging. Legacy of Darkness features two high-stakes survival horror sequences: In the Villa's maze garden, players must help Henry through the labyrinthine hedges while strong, unbeatable enemies give chase. In the Castle Center, players must carefully carry the "magic nitro" item through a nerve-wracking obstacle course to its destination. One fall or hit can cause the volatile chemical to explode, resulting in immediate death.

== Plot ==
Set in the year 1844, the game stars the man-beast Cornell in his quest to prevent his adoptive sister, Ada, from being used as a sacrifice to resurrect Dracula. The game opens as Cornell arrives at his village, which has been burned to the ground by Dracula's minions. He finds Ada's pendant in a doorway and follows her scent to Dracula's castle.

During the course of the game, Cornell comes upon a grand estate owned by the Oldrey family: J.A. Oldrey, the master of the Villa, Mary, his wife, and Henry, their son. Gilles de Rais and Actrise have turned Oldrey Senior into a vampire. At Mary's request, Cornell guides Henry to safety. Later in life, Henry returns to Castlevania to save kidnapped children.

Throughout the game, Cornell encounters his rival and fellow man-beast, Ortega. Ortega has allied himself with Dracula to finally beat Cornell in combat, turning into a chimera like creature. They eventually battle near the end of the game, just before Cornell defeats Dracula and saves his sister. He only accomplishes the latter by sacrificing his man-wolf powers. Unbeknownst to the hero, acquiring this power was the true aim of the dark forces, as it was the perfect sacrifice (not Ada, as Cornell had assumed) to resurrect Dracula at his full power.

== Development ==
Legacy of Darkness is a continuation of Konami's first attempt of Castlevania, also published in 1999 to create a 3D Castlevania. For example, Cornell was present in early development media and press information for Castlevania, but was ultimately removed before the game's release.

Legacy of Darkness's primary focus is on a new story (a prequel to Carrie and Reinhardt's adventures) in which Cornell explores new levels, as well as redesigned levels from Castlevania. Levels from Castlevania that have not been drastically changed (such as the Villa) are often navigated in a new or novel manner and feature different puzzles. Completing the game once unlocks Henry's quest, and he explores his own set of levels and new bosses. Many are redesigned levels from Castlevania.

Carrie and Reinhardt's quests are a secondary focus (bonus features), that can only be unlocked after completing both Cornell and Henry's quests. Carrie and Reinhardt's quests lack the voice acting, some cutscenes and the original level designs present in Castlevania (due to space concerns), instead adopting the new level designs (from Cornell and Henry's quests). Their quests also feature new bosses from Henry's quest, such as Medusa and the Queen of the Spider. They are also given new armor and weapon designs, though the original starting armor from Castlevania can be unlocked during Henry's quest.

In Legacy of Darkness control of the game's characters, camera, and frame-rate were streamlined. The game supports the Nintendo 64's Expansion Pak add-on, which allows for an option in which textures are displayed in a higher resolution. However, this mode has some frame-rate issues.

Castlevania: Legacy of Darkness was present within the series' original chronology from its original release until 2002, when a timeline published on the official Japanese Castlevania: Harmony of Dissonance website omitted it – as well as several other Castlevania games – from the series' continuity. The others also included Castlevania Legends for the Game Boy, Castlevania: Circle of the Moon and the original Castlevania release for the Nintendo 64.

In 2006, series producer Koji Igarashi stated that "These games were taken out of the timeline [...] not because I didn't work on them, but because they were considered by their directors to be side projects in the series". Since the 2002 removal, the events of Legacy of Darkness have occupied an ambiguous place in timelines published by Konami of Japan, Konami of America, and various gaming publications. The most recent English language timeline, distributed with preordered versions of Castlevania: Portrait of Ruin in North America by Konami of America, includes Legacy of Darkness but does not describe the game's plot. Igarashi later clarified that he looks at the titles as "...a Castlevania "gaiden" (subseries)" and complimented them by stating "...they both have a really unique take on the Castlevania world."

== Reception ==
Reception

Aggregate score
Aggregator	Score
GameRankings	64%

Review scores
Publication	Score
AllGame	3.5/5
CNET Gamecenter	8/10
Electronic Gaming Monthly	7.25/10 (Note: In Electronic Gaming Monthly's review of the game, two critics gave it each a score of 7.5/10, and two others gave it each a score of 7/10.)
Famitsu	28/40
Game Informer	5.25/10
GameFan	89%
GameSpot	7.3/10
Hyper	78%
IGN	6.8/10
N64 Magazine	75%
Next Generation	2/5
Nintendo Power	7.2/10

Legacy of Darkness received mixed reviews according to the review aggregation website GameRankings. Blake Fischer of NextGen said of the game, "Legacy of Mediocrity is more like it, at least in 3D. We hope the next installment on Dreamcast will be better, but until then, this is satisfactory." The planned Dreamcast game, Castlevania Resurrection, was eventually canceled. In Japan, Famitsu gave it a score of 28 out of 40.

The Freshman of GamePro said in one review that the game was "basically what the N64's Castlevania was meant to be. It's more of a remake than a sequel, as if you're being asked to forget the one before ever happened. If future Castlevania 3D games can build on the good things about this one (and leave out the bad), then maybe the series can have a bright future after all." (Note: GamePro gave the game two 4/5 scores for graphics and sound, and two 3.5/5 scores for control and fun factor in one review.) Boba Fatt, however, said of the game in another review, "Legacy is bigger, but it isn't better. Even with four characters, the gameplay bites the big one. It's not worth a second look from Castlevania fans, or even a first look from newbies." (Note: GamePro gave the game 3/5 for graphics, 3.5/5 for sound, 1/5 for control, and 2/5 for fun factor in another review.)

In 2012, Tim Turi of Game Informer felt that the werewolf form was interesting but not enough to make it a good game.

Time Extension placed the game 19th on its list of ranked Castlevania games: "While having another storyline to play through is welcome, Legacy of Darkness doesn't do a great deal to correct what was wrong with Castlevania 64, and the attempts it does make at providing something superior – such as support for the N64's RAM upgrade for higher resolution – are undone; the game's frame rate tanks when the RAM pak is installed, making it hard to play. "
