= Castlevania: Lament of Innocence =

2003 video game

- North American box art
- Developer: Konami Computer Entertainment Tokyo
- Publisher: Konami
- Producer: Koji Igarashi
- Programmer: Takashi Takeda
- Artist: Ayami Kojima
- Writer: Koji Igarashi
- Composer: Michiru Yamane
- Series: Castlevania
- Platform: PlayStation 2
- Release: PlayStation 2: NA: October 21, 2003; JP: November 27, 2003; EU: February 13, 2004; AU: February 20, 2004; PlayStation Network: JP: August 22, 2012; NA: June 18, 2013
- Genres: Action-adventure, hack and slash
- Mode: Single-player

Castlevania: Lament of Innocence (Note: Known in Japan as simply Castlevania (キャッスルヴァニア, Kyassuruvania)) (Note: This made it the fourth installment in the series to be titled Castlevania in Europe and Australia.) is a 2003 action-adventure game developed by Konami Computer Entertainment Tokyo and published by Konami for the PlayStation 2 console. Part of Konami's Castlevania video game series, it is the first installment of the series on the PlayStation 2 and the third to make use of a 3D style of gameplay. It was released in Japan and North America in late 2003 and Europe and Australia in early 2004.

Lament of Innocence is chronologically the first game in the Castlevania series. Set in 1094, it focuses on the origins of the series' premise—the eternal conflict between the vampire hunters of the Belmont clan and the immortal vampire Dracula. Lament of Innocence follows Leon Belmont as he searches a vampire's castle in search of his kidnapped betrothed.

Lament of Innocence received generally positive reviews upon release, with praise for the origin story, gameplay, music, and graphics, though some criticized its repetitive level design and excessive backtracking.

== Gameplay ==
Leon (center) fights the Medusa boss; the heads-up display indicates his remaining "health", magic points, and number of subweapons (upper left) and the boss's life bar (lower center).

The objective of Lament of Innocence is to lead the primary player character and protagonist Leon Belmont through the monster-filled castle as he searches for his kidnapped beloved. Exploring the castle is an open-ended task, with puzzles, concealed items and rooms, and bosses. A room near the castle's entrance contains portals to the five main areas, all of which are accessible from the beginning. After Leon defeats each area's boss, the final area becomes unlocked. Health restoratives and items to improve gaming statistics such as strength and defense can be purchased with in-game money from a shop on the castle grounds.

For his primary weapon, Leon makes use of the Whip of Alchemy given to him by a non-player character, the shopkeeper named Rinaldo. Later on, Leon can acquire three more whips, each guarded by an elemental boss: the Ice, Lightning, and Fire Elemental Whips. Near the end of the game, his Whip of Alchemy turns into the more destructive Vampire Killer. In addition, Leon can combine one of five sub-weapons—a knife, an axe, a cross, a crystal, and holy water—with one of seven orbs to form a special attack. Over the course of the game, he learns special techniques and magic attacks as well.

Two additional player characters can be unlocked: the new character Pumpkin, and Joachim, a vampire who appeared earlier in the game as a boss. Pumpkin makes use of Leon's whip as the primary weapon and only one sub-weapon, has all whip and defensive skills prelearned, and does more damage than Leon. In contrast, Joachim uses five flying swords as his primary weapons; he lacks an inventory and the ability to use relics and purchase items from Rinaldo's shop. However, Joachim has access to two magic attacks in the place of sub-weapons.

== Plot ==
Set in 1094, it focuses on the origins of the series' premise (Note: Lament of Innocence's story takes place earlier than the prequel Castlevania Legends (Game Boy, 1997), which depicts the first battle between the Belmont clan and Dracula in 1450; Legends was later removed from the series' canon by Igarashi, for its conflict with the timeline of the series.)—the conflict between the vampire-hunting Belmont clan and the vampire Dracula. The protagonist and primary player character of Lament of Innocence is Leon Belmont, a former baron and member of the Belmont clan. His close friend, Mathias Cronqvist, tells him that Leon's betrothed, Sara, is being held captive by the powerful vampire Walter Bernhard. During the game, he encounters Rinaldo Gandolfi, an alchemist and resident of the forest outside Walter's castle.

Arriving on the castle grounds, Leon meets Rinaldo, who gives him a whip crafted by alchemy to assist in killing the monsters and enchants his gauntlet so he is able to use magic relics within the castle. Leon learns that he must defeat five monsters to gain access to Walter's throne room. Arriving at the castle, Leon proceeds to defeat the five monsters, including Joachim Armster, a vampire kept prisoner in the castle by Walter. Before dying, Joachim mentions the Ebony and Crimson Stones, both of which are created from alchemy, and explains to Leon that the Ebony Stone can produce darkness. From Rinaldo, Leon learns that the Crimson Stone converts the souls of vampires into power for its holder.

After Leon reaches Walter's quarters, he rescues Sara and attempts to slay him with the whip, to no effect. At Rinaldo's cottage, it is revealed that Sara is slowly becoming a vampire. Rinaldo reveals that Leon must sacrifice Sara to make the whip effective against Walter. Overhearing their conversation, Sara begs him to kill her and use her soul to save others from suffering her fate. Leon reluctantly completes the ritual, creating the Vampire Killer whip.

Devastated by the loss of Sara, Leon returns to the castle to confront Walter and defeats him. Death takes the dying Walter's soul and offers it up to Mathias; Mathias appears and reveals he had orchestrated everything to obtain his soul and convert it into power for himself using the Crimson Stone. Mathias explains that he chose immortality as a vampire so he could curse God for taking away his beloved wife Elisabetha. He offers Leon the same, but a disgusted Leon refuses. Mathias orders Death to kill Leon, but Leon defeats Death and vows that the Belmont clan will hunt down Mathias and destroy him one day. (The game's epilogue reveals that Mathias became Dracula, the series' main antagonist.)

== Development ==
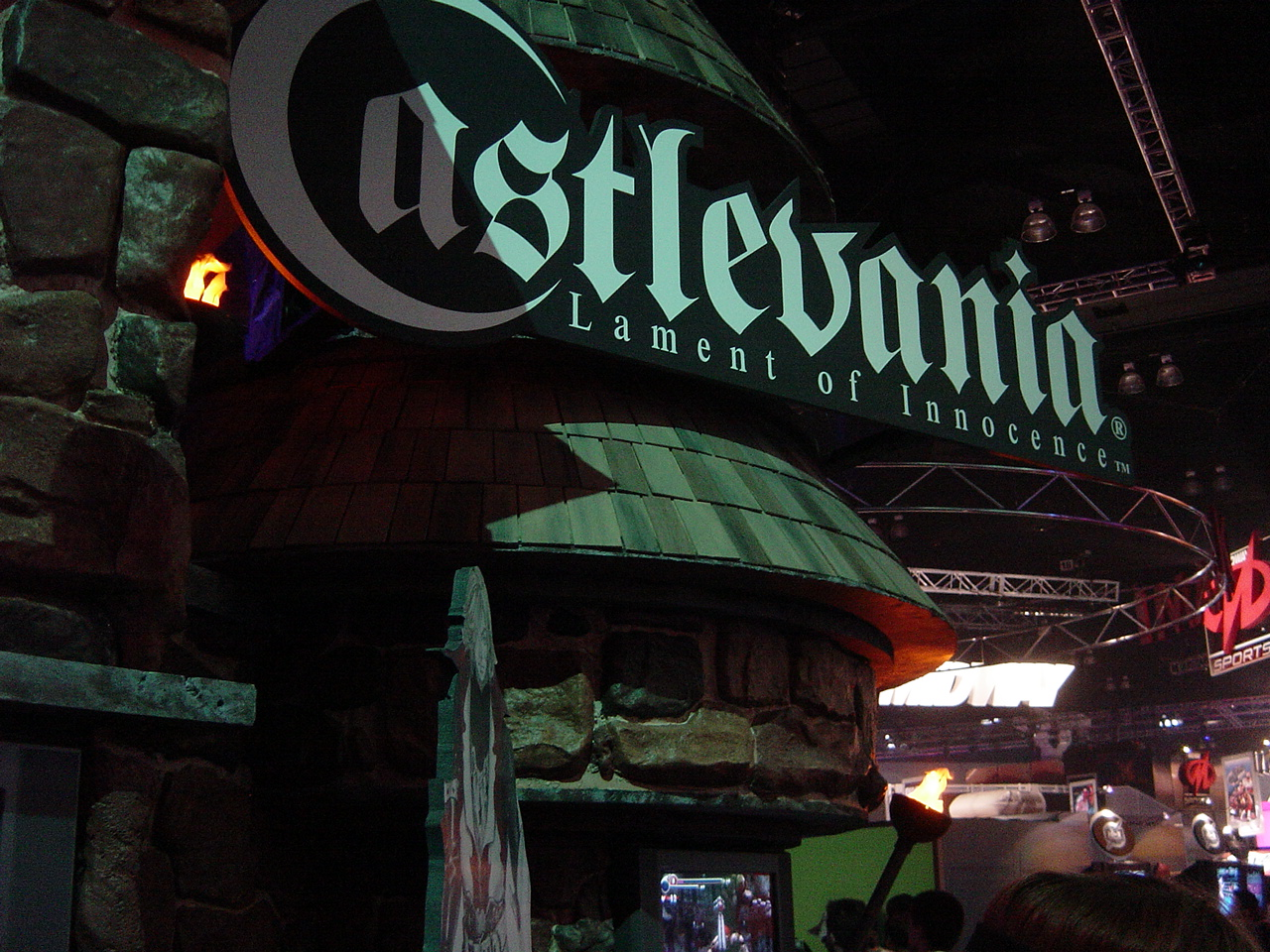
Promotion at the 2003 Electronic Entertainment Expo

Producer Koji Igarashi unveiled Lament of Innocence at the 2003 Electronic Entertainment Expo. Lament of Innocence marks the first appearance of the series on the PlayStation 2 and is third in the series to make use of a three-dimensional (3D) format, after the Nintendo 64 installments Castlevania and Castlevania: Legacy of Darkness (both 1999). The game's title in Japan, Castlevania, was meant to reflect the fact that Igarashi intended Lament of Innocence to be a new starting point for the series. Envisioning the concept of the game as possessing "fully connected rooms", Igarashi found that this hindered the map's accessibility and made the puzzles more difficult to solve. He then divided the map into separate ones for each area and "[kept] the puzzles contained within each area."

While Igarashi "extended a 2D game style into 3D", the 3D environment proved to be quite different, possessing less precision. According to Igarashi, the 2D games proved easier to create, as the player could easily understand all elements of the 2D game, such as the location of the monster and where the player character should run or attack. Despite these trade-offs, he enjoyed that the 3D graphics contributed to creating a "reality-based environment" in gaming. The team completed Lament of Innocence, with time left over to further refine the balance of the game's elements; as a result, the game became progressively difficult as the team grew accustomed to it, according to Igarashi. Promotion for the game in Japan included pop singer Sonim dressed as its protagonist.

Lament of Innocence continues the style begun in Castlevania: Symphony of the Night (PlayStation, 1997), with Ayami Kojima as illustrator and Michiru Yamane as composer. Although Castlevania installments typically feature many arrangements of music that had appeared in earlier games, Igarashi limited the number of arrangements that could appear in Lament of Innocence to one or two, because the game served as the origins of the series. Yamane made use of a wide range of styles, including dance music, solos on the piano, instrumental arias, and industrial rock.

== Release ==
The game was released on October 21, 2003, in North America, on November 27, 2003, in Japan, and on February 13, 2004, in Europe. A Japanese limited edition was released simultaneously and contained bonus content: a painting by Kojima, a calendar, and a music CD. In Japan, Lament of Innocence saw a re-release under the Konami Dendou Collection label on March 2, 2006. The game was released for the PlayStation Network on June 18, 2013.

== Reception ==
Reception

Aggregate score
Aggregator	Score
Metacritic	79/100

Review scores
Publication	Score
1Up.com	B+
Edge	8/10
Eurogamer	7/10
Game Informer	8/10
GamePro	5/5
GameSpot	7.7/10
GameSpy	3/5
GameZone	9/10
IGN	9/10
Official U.S. PlayStation Magazine	4/5
Play	B+

Award
Publication	Award
IGN	Editors' Choice

Review aggregator Metacritic shows an averaged score of 79 out of 100, indicating "generally favorable reviews". Edge stated: "While it's not as cleverly structured as the pinnacle of the series, Symphony of the Night, it resurrects that game's hallmarks of seductive exploration and satisfying topographical progress. It breathes new life back into one of videogaming's oldest franchises." Play wrote: "A bold success as an incendiary action game, brilliantly nuanced in its mechanics and full of atmospheric appeal. And it's also a fantastic version of Castlevania... My criticism comes, mostly, from imagining the triumphant possibilities a Castlevania adventure holds." According to Game Informer, the game "[a]lmost feels like an exercise (albeit a beautiful-looking one) exploring many of the franchise's classic components. But the end result just proves that Castlevania is more than a set of ideas, it's a gameplay experience that remains not fully realized." Conversely, Jeremy Jastrzab of PALGN wrote in an unfavorable review: "If you want to walk around a large repetitive castle, Castlevania: Lament of Innocence will do the job for you." Game Informer's Tim Turi felt that it was a "decent action game for its time" though he also felt it was too linear and wasn't worthy enough to be a Castlevania game.

The gameplay of Lament of Innocence received generally positive reaction from reviewers, who praised it as enjoyable and "intuitive," though not complex. A reviewer for GameZone drew comparisons of Lament of Innocence's gameplay to that of Devil May Cry (2001). Overall, the developers' attempt to re-transition the series from a 2D side-scrolling style of gameplay to a 3D one with Lament of Innocence was positively received. The Official PlayStation Magazine stated: "Proof that a Castlevania game can be done in 3D while retaining the essence of the series with great music and gameplay, and a stylized look. There's still room for improvement, but it's a great new beginning." Reviewers criticized the hallways and rooms as repetitive, and the gaming camera was a mixed bag for reviewers. Times Online found it "excellent, it's like a good referee — you don't even notice it most of the time," while PALGN and Jeremy Dunham of IGN found the angles unhelpful when platforming. Other criticism included the difficulty in uncovering the secret items, length of the gameplay, absence of a map for the entire castle, and that the player had to search for and use inventory items as a battle was occurring.

The plot of the series was generally positively received. GameSpy praised it as "foreboding and well-played – ahead of the curve for a genre best known for making the player bite back laughs at fatuous melodrama," while GMR Magazine stated: "The story is treated with respect and subtle class (that is, if you disregard the lackluster dialogue), with the conclusion providing the foundation for the many eventual battles between the Belmonts & Dracula." IGN wrote that it borrowed elements from the film Bram Stoker's Dracula (1992). Additionally, reviewers generally praised it for the atmosphere and details of the graphics. According to GamePro's Mike Weigand, "[t]here's atmosphere to burn, too, as the vivid graphics bring shadows, fog, brick, and other surroundings to life." Conversely, GameZone felt that the graphics, though nice, looked dated. The voice acting drew mixed reactions from reviewers, from well-done to overdone and "terrible". In contrast the soundtrack was generally praised as fitting, although PALGN wrote that sometimes it felt out of place.

Lament of Innocence has also been examined in retrospective. 1UP.com's Kurt Kalata wrote that the "dungeon-crawling gameplay and repetitive environments" prevented Lament of Innocence from succeeding as a game. According to Kalata, the controls and feel of the game were improved over the Nintendo 64 installments. According to Mark Bozon of IGN, the game continued the "style and presentation as previous Castlevania games." PALGN's David Low noted that the game was not commercially successful and wrote that the Nintendo 64 installments of the series had more ambition, with Castlevania of the Nintendo 64 remaining the "definitive 3D Castlevania game". Finding Lament of Innocence enjoyable for a little bit of time with potential for a sequel, Low expressed his disappointment that, while the Castlevania installments for the handheld game consoles were gaining depth and refinement in his opinion, PS2 players were presented with "an undeveloped and repetitive action game".

The game has attracted scholarly analysis. In their study of religion in video games (2007), William Sims Bainbridge and Wilma Alice Bainbridge examined several offline and online video games, among them Lament of Innocence. Bainbridge and Bainbridge note that holy water and a cross, both religious items, aid the protagonist in his quest, sometimes better than his axe, knife or whip; they suggest the holy water and cross are "[t]he only help religion offers" in the game.
