= Delpower X Bakuhatsu Miracle Genki! =

Japanese original video animation

デルパワーX爆発みらくる元気!
- Genre: Science fiction Mecha; Comedy
- Original video animation
- Directed by: Masato Sato
- Written by: Yumiko Tsukamoto
- Studio: Big Bang
- Released: 1986-12-21
- Runtime: 41 minutes

Delpower X Bakuhatsu Miracle Genki! (デルパワーX爆発みらくる元気!) is a 1986 mecha original video animation. The story is of a Japanese teenage girl and a powered armor suit.

== Plot ==
Teenager Hanegi Manami leaves to go to school, just as a helicopter delivers a powered armor for her grandfather. Known as Del Power X, it is designed specifically for Hanegi Manami

== Voice actors ==
- Jouji Yanami as Tatsuemon Yanami
- Ryo Horikawa as Yousuke Miyamoto
- Takeshi Aono as Von Getzel
- Banjou Ginga as Nick Jagger
- Hiroko Emori as Suzie Willis
- Hiromi Murata as Laura McLaren
- Hiromi Tsuru as Hanegi Manami
- Masaya Onosaka as Horie
- Mayumi Shou as Akise Hiroko
- Yuki Sato as Mizumoto
- Banjou Ginga
- Kaneto Shiozawa
- Ryo Horikawa
