= Castlevania: Harmony of Dissonance =

2002 video game

- North American box art depicting main protagonist Juste Belmont
- Developer: Konami Computer Entertainment Tokyo
- Publisher: Konami
- Director: Takashi Takeda
- Producer: Koji Igarashi
- Designers: Takashi Takeda; Shinichiro Shimamura
- Programmer: Kenji Miura
- Artist: Ayami Kojima
- Writer: Koji Igarashi
- Composers: Soshiro Hokkai; Michiru Yamane
- Series: Castlevania
- Platform: Game Boy Advance
- Release: JP: June 6, 2002; NA: September 17, 2002; EU: October 11, 2002
- Genres: Action role-playing, Metroidvania
- Mode: Single-player

Castlevania: Harmony of Dissonance (Note: Known in Japan as Castlevania: Byakuya no Concerto (Japanese: キャッスルヴァニア 白夜の協(コン)奏(チェ)曲(ルト), Hepburn: Kyassuruvania Byakuya no Koncheruto; lit. Castlevania: Concerto of Midnight Sun)) is a 2002 action role-playing game developed and published by Konami for the Game Boy Advance. The second installment of the Castlevania series on the Game Boy Advance, the game was released in Japan in June 2002 and in North America and PAL regions later that same year. Harmony of Dissonance is set in the year 1748, fifty years after Simon Belmont vanquished Dracula's curse in Castlevania II: Simon's Quest. Harmony of Dissonance focuses on Simon's grandson, Juste Belmont, and his quest to rescue a kidnapped childhood friend.

Similarly to previous Castlevania titles, the game employs role-playing game features alongside more traditional exploration elements. Progression is split between two versions of the titular castle, requiring Juste to traverse both maps in search of abilities, armor and weapons to combat an assortment of enemies, including various bosses. In addition to his whip and subweapons found around each castle's grounds, Juste can perform more powerful magic attacks by finding spell books that can imbue sub weapons he finds in each castle with elemental properties, as well as augmentations for his whip that can destroy certain obstacles blocking progression to certain areas of each map.

Koji Igarashi produced Harmony of Dissonance with the intent of "creat[ing] a game that was similar to Castlevania: Symphony of the Night", the critically acclaimed PlayStation game that he had worked on. Harmony of Dissonance sold 126,000 units in the United States in its first three months of sales, but it was not a success in Japan. Critics praised its graphics which was considered an improvement over its predecessor, gameplay, and return to elements from Symphony of the Night, while criticism was directed towards its confusing map design, story, and music.

== Gameplay ==
The HUD on the top left of the screen shows the player's current health (red), magic (blue), and what sub-weapon they are currently holding. At the center of the screen, the player character, Juste, is casting a magic attack.

Harmony of Dissonance makes use of a 2D side-scrolling style of gameplay, similar to many of the previous Castlevania video games. The objective of the game is to lead the player character, Juste Belmont, through the monster-filled castle as he searches for his kidnapped friend. The castle consists of two "layers": Castle A and B. Structurally, each castle has mostly the same room layout, but monster types, items, and other aspects vary between the two versions. Later, the player can use special warp rooms that can teleport Juste to other castle rooms and between castles. The two castles share a connection; for example, the destruction of a wall in one castle can cause a change in the other. The game further divides the castle into various, named areas: the Shrine of the Apostates, for example. Relics and keys found within the castle allow Juste to reach previously inaccessible areas. Harmony of Dissonance makes use of the forward dash move, which causes Juste to move forward with a short burst of speed. Unique to Harmony of Dissonance is the ability to collect furniture and collectables to furnish a bare room that Juste finds in the castle.

Juste primarily attacks at close quarters using the series' traditional whip weapon, the Vampire Killer. It can be brandished to deflect projectile attacks, reminiscent of Simon Belmont's usage of the weapon in Super Castlevania IV. A variety of ranged sub-weapons—holy water, a dagger, a holy book, a cross, an axe, and a thunder gauntlet—are available, one of which can be carried at any given time and combined with one of the five spell books—Fire Book, Ice Book, Bolt Book, Wind Book, and the Summoning Tome—hidden throughout the castle to create a magical attack. Casting a spell renders the player character invincible for a moment.

Harmony of Dissonance makes use of role-playing elements. Defeating minor enemies and bosses procure experience points for Juste, who levels up when statistical requirements are met. Leveling up increases his statistics: hit points, the amount of damage the character receives before dying; magic points, which affects how often he can cast a magical attack; strength, the power of the physical attack; defense, the reduction of damage taken from an enemy; intelligence, the strength of the magical attack; and luck, which determines the rate of items dropped by enemies. Certain relics affect his statistics: the Fang of Vlad increases his defense points, for example. Equipment in the form of weapon modifications, armor and accessories can be found scattered about the castle and contribute to his statistics. Occasionally, an enemy drops an item after being killed. Items can be bought with in-game money from a merchant who appears in various places throughout the castle.

Additional modes can be unlocked in the game. For Boss Rush Mode, the player is required to complete the game once and can fight the bosses from the game in order with the number of bosses depending on the level of difficulty selected. If the player enters the Konami Code before the title screen, they will unlock a special version of Boss Rush mode as Simon Belmont, resembling his 8-bit appearance from the original Castlevania (1986) and inheriting properties such as stiffer ground movement and restrictive jumps. Maxim Mode requires the player to finish the game with the best ending and allows the player to take control of Maxim. Unlike Juste, Maxim cannot equip items and can only use his sword and giant shuriken (sub-weapon) as weapons. Maxim has the ability to triple jump and cast certain spells by inputting certain button combinations. Finishing with the best ending also unlocks an option to listen to the music of the game.

== Plot ==
=== Setting and characters ===
Harmony of Dissonance takes place in 1748, fifty years after Simon Belmont ended Dracula's curse. A result of his battle against Dracula was that the villagers changed their opinion of him and the Belmont family. Producer Koji Igarashi explained: "Simon was regarded as a life-saver, and people started to look upon him as a hero; little by little, the people started to gather around them. A village, therefore, was formed around Belmonts. Juste Belmont grew up in this environment with his childhood friends Maxim Kischine and Lydie Erlanger."

The protagonist and primary player character is Juste Belmont, the grandson of Simon Belmont and descendant of Trevor Belmont and Sypha Belnades, who at the age of sixteen, gained the Vampire Killer whip. Together with his amnesiac and injured best friend Maxim Kischine, he sets off to rescue his kidnapped childhood friend, Lydie Erlanger. While exploring the castle, he encounters a merchant who stumbled upon the castle and Death, Dracula's servant.

=== Story ===
Juste meets Maxim at a castle where Lydie is being held captive; after a brief talk, he leaves Maxim outside and begins to explore the castle. Within the castle, Juste encounters Death, who confirms that the castle is Dracula's. He meets up with a dazed Maxim, whose memory is slowly returning to him, and they split up to cover more ground. While trekking through the castle, Juste notices that the castle sometimes has different atmospheres. He continues to encounter Maxim, but is baffled by how his friend seems to change personalities periodically. In one of their meetings, Maxim reveals that he went on a journey to find and destroy the remains of Dracula, something Simon Belmont had previously done, but when he collected all six, his memory went blank.

Juste encounters Death again, who explains that the castle has been split in two "layers" to accommodate the two spirits living in Maxim's body: his original spirit and an evil one created from Dracula's remains and his suppressed jealousy of Juste. Maxim later confirms this and admits to being Lydie's kidnapper. Juste meets his friend again in the other layer of the castle where he reveals that he lost his memory to protect Lydie. He gives Juste his bracelet to help him locate her in the castle. However, when Juste finds her, Death kidnaps her to use her blood as a means to unite the two castles by destroying Maxim's spirit. Juste defeats Death, and proceeds to search for Maxim. Along the way, he accumulates Dracula's remains, which are scattered throughout the castle. In the center of the castle, he finds Maxim with an unconscious Lydie.

There are three endings to the game. In the first, Maxim, possessed, has already bitten Lydie. With Maxim's defeat, Juste escapes the collapsing castle alone and curses his inability to save either friend. In the second, Maxim struggles against the possession and urges Juste to kill him. In his final moments, he thanks Juste for killing him and reveals that he had wished to save him from his fate as a Belmont. Outside the castle, Lydie awakens, unharmed, and tells Juste not to blame himself for Maxim's death. The third ending begins the same as the first, except that, during the fight, Maxim notices that Juste wore his bracelet and resists the possession. Dracula flees into a weakened form using the gathered remains and fights Juste, planning to use his blood to return himself to full power. Vanquishing him, Juste escapes the castle together with Maxim and Lydie, whose bite marks disappear by the time she regains consciousness. Outside the castle, the three resolve to return home.

== Development ==
Produced by Koji Igarashi and developed by Konami Computer Entertainment Tokyo, Castlevania: Harmony of Dissonance is the second installment of Konami's Castlevania video game series for the Game Boy Advance (GBA). Its predecessor Castlevania: Circle of the Moon had been developed by a different studio, Konami Computer Entertainment Kobe. Igarashi began the game's development with the intention of making an installment of the series for GBA that shared similarities with Symphony of the Night (1997). Ayami Kojima, who had previously worked on the character designs for Symphony of the Night, designed the characters of Harmony of Dissonance.

Harmony of Dissonance incorporates other changes: a fusion-spell system replaced the dual-card system introduced in Circle of the Moon, and the graphics were brightened and controls improved. In production at the same time was Castlevania: Aria of Sorrow (2003), and as a result, the two share similar programming engines and gameplay elements.

=== Audio ===
On June 26, 2002, Konami published Castlevania: Circle of the Moon & Castlevania: Concerto of Midnight Sun Original Soundtrack (KMCA-162). Soshiro Hokkai composed the soundtrack for Harmony of Dissonance with Michiru Yamane creating the additional stage music. Igarashi later noted that the quality of the music had been "sacrifice[d]" for the graphics of the game.

== Release ==
Originally slated for a mid-June release, Harmony of Dissonance was not released until September 2002. It was released in Japan on June 6, 2002, in North America on September 17, 2002, and in Europe on October 11, 2002. In the United States, about 126,000 units of Harmony of Dissonance were sold, and in Japan, it was not considered a "huge hit" by Igarashi.

Castlevania: Harmony of Dissonance was re-released in North America in January 2006, along with Castlevania: Aria of Sorrow, as part of Castlevania Double Pack. Both games are contained on a single GBA Game Pak. This pack appeared in Europe later that year. It was picked as the IGN Game Boy Game of the Month for January 2006. It was published on the Wii U Virtual Console on October 16, 2014, in North America.

The game was re-released as part of the Castlevania Advance Collection on September 23, 2021, for the Nintendo Switch, PlayStation 4, Windows, and Xbox One alongside Castlevania: Circle of the Moon, Castlevania: Aria of Sorrow, and Castlevania: Dracula X.

== Reception ==
Reception

Aggregate scores
Aggregator	Score
GameRankings	84%
Metacritic	87/100
OpenCritic	83% recommend(As part of the Advance Collection) (Note: Based on 23 reviews.)

Review scores
Publication	Score
Electronic Gaming Monthly	9.67/10
Famitsu	8/10, 8/10, 7/10, 8/10
Game Informer	9.5/10
GamePro	3.5/5
GameSpot	8.2/10
GameSpy	87/100
IGN	9.2/10
Nintendo Power	4.2/5
Play	5/5

Award
Publication	Award
IGN	Editors' Choice Award

Metacritic assigned it a score of 87 of 100 while GameRankings gave it an 84%.

Four writers for the Japanese gaming magazine Famitsu reviewed the game. Two reviewers commented on it being on a handheld system, with one saying they were continiously impressed in the graphics and sound quality for a Game Boy Advance game, while another said that it was a legitimate follow-up for the Castlevania series. One reviewer said that while it wasn't particularly groundbreaking, it remained accessible and found it easy to be drawn into the game. At the time of its release, Harmony of Dissonance received positive reviews from English-language critics. GameSpot commended it as "not just a fine Castlevania game—it's also one of the better Game Boy Advance games to come around in a while". GameSpy stated: "Despite its unevenness, Castlevania: Harmony of Dissonance is a quality adventure that represents the best attempt yet made at miniaturizing the brilliance of Symphony of the Night." While worrying about the loss of originality of the franchise and noting that "Harmony of Dissonance almost obsessively copies Symphony of the Night", GamePro called it "a fun action game and a fine Castlevania game in its own right." The improved graphics of Harmony of Dissonance, especially the backgrounds, 3D effects, and multi-jointed bosses, received praise from reviewers, who called them "plentiful and visually stunning", and "top-notch". It was a runner-up for GameSpot's 2002 "Best Graphics on Game Boy Advance" award. During the 6th Annual Interactive Achievement Awards, the Academy of Interactive Arts & Sciences nominated Harmony of Dissonance for "Handheld Game of the Year", which was ultimately awarded to Metroid Fusion.

The soundtrack of the game was less well received. Critics panned the music as "easily the worst Castlevania soundtrack" and "muddy, plodding, and reminiscent of the days of four-channel NES soundtracks". Conversely, GameSpot found that the music was "decent" and occasionally "fitting or even catchy", but failed to live up to the high expectations of the series. The publication later nominated the game for its annual "Most Disappointing Game on Game Boy Advance" award, citing the music. IGN felt that while not "quite as bad as importers have made it out to be", the songs "aren't nearly as nice as they have been in past Castlevania adventures." Reviewers also disliked the lack of difficulty with GamePro describing it as the game's "biggest flaw". Other criticism included predictable and easy boss battles, and "a much smaller explorable area and somewhat less compelling map design".

Retrospectively, however, websites and fans have been more critical of the game. PALGN's David Low criticized the inclusion of the "possessed ally" element from previous Castlevania titles along with the game's easier gameplay, the player character's badly animated sprite, and the occasionally gaudy environments. Looking back on the series, Mark Bozon of IGN concluded: "Still Harmony of Dissonance shows off some decent visuals as an in-between, mid-generation game, and paved the way for GBA's strongest Castlevania title, Aria of Sorrow." Game Informer's Tim Turi meanwhile felt that its design was among Castlevania's best despite having among the worst music in the series.
