= Castlevania: Bloodlines =

1994 video game

- North American box art
- Developer: Konami
- Publisher: Konami
- Director: Yutaka Haruki
- Producer: Tomikazu Kirita
- Designers: Teisaku Seki; Shinichiro Shimamura
- Writer: Toshiki Yamamura
- Composer: Michiru Yamane
- Series: Castlevania
- Platform: Sega Genesis
- Release: NA: March 17, 1994; JP: March 18, 1994; EU: March 20, 1994
- Genre: Platform
- Mode: Single-player

Castlevania: Bloodlines, (Note: Known in Japan as Vampire Killer (Japanese: バンパイアキラー, Hepburn: Banpaia Kirā)) known in PAL regions as Castlevania: The New Generation, is a 1994 platform game developed and published by Konami for the Sega Genesis as part of the Castlevania series. A vampire named Elizabeth Bartley is orchestrating the beginning of World War I to serve as the catalyst for the resurrection of her uncle, Dracula. Players take on the role of Quincey Morris' son, John, and his friend Eric Lecarde to take up the fight against evil.

The development team approached Bloodlines as a unique Castlevania experience tailor-made for the Genesis. In this sense, the gameplay was made more fast and action-oriented. Writer Toshiki Yamamura was focused on crafting what he viewed as a new chapter in the Castlevania continuity. The game was the first Castlevania title for which Michiru Yamane composed music. She used her Bach influences to compose the soundtrack, leading to her becoming a recurring series composer.

Bloodlines was released to positive reviews. It was re-released as part of the Castlevania Anniversary Collection on May 16, 2019, as well as the Sega Genesis Mini on September 19, 2019 and as one of the inaugural Genesis games for the Nintendo Classics service on October 25, 2021. Bloodlines' storyline and characters were eventually continued in subsequent installments and other media related to the series, most notably in Castlevania: Portrait of Ruin (2006) for the Nintendo DS.

== Gameplay ==
Each player-character has special controls and abilities. Using the d-pad, the player can attack enemies diagonally up as John Morris.

As with most early Castlevania games, players proceed through each level, defeating enemies and collecting gems to power special weapons: the axe, boomerang and holy water. Each stage is sectioned, and has a sub-boss battle in the middle, with a main boss battle at the end. Some items increase the power of the characters' weapons. Some portions of the game split into different paths, depending on which character is chosen. John is able to swing past gaps with his whip, whereas Eric must use a different route by performing high jumps by using his spear.

== Plot ==
Before the events of the game, Dracula was laid to eternal rest in 1897 by Quincy Morris, a distant descendant of the Belmont family. Peace was restored to Europe, until the outbreak of the First World War, which transformed the continent into a dark world filled with massacre and violence. At the beginning of the war, in June 1914 at Sarajevo, the Crown Prince of Austria was assassinated. The vampire Elizabeth Bartley, who, in order to revive her uncle, Count Dracula, had conducted an unholy ceremony which caused the war, giving her possession of human souls from Europe.

The game itself takes place in 1917. The characters are John Morris, a distant descendant of the famed Belmont and Morris families who embraces his fate to fight vampires day and night, and Eric Lecarde, whose girlfriend was transformed into a vampire when Elizabeth was revived. After Elizabeth's servant the witch Drolta Tzuentes resurrected her, they traveled across Europe to conduct the resurrection of Count Dracula. John Morris and Eric Lecarde follow them. Bloodlines concludes with the vampire hunters defeating him and his allies.

== Development ==
Bloodlines was developed by Konami in Tokyo. The concept behind the game was to develop a unique Castlevania experience for the Sega Genesis. In this sense, the gameplay was made fast and action-packed while retaining the strategic elements of previous games, and Eric was added as a playable character to add a distinct touch to the game. The game is a spin-off of the main Castlevania series. In fact, the game is also set in a wholly different era from previous games. Scenario writer Toshiki Yamamura took inspiration from novelist Hideyuki Kikuchi to craft his own interpretation of the series canon for Bloodlines. He viewed Bloodlines as the second act in a three-part Castlevania saga. The development team was challenged with the limitations of the Genesis's color palette, and the 8 megabit cart size, but felt they were able to craft a unique atmosphere with intricately animated characters despite this.

The music was composed by Michiru Yamane. Though already an established composer at Konami, Bloodlines was her first time composing for a Castlevania game. As the series was already popular and known for its music, she felt pressure to perform well. Having extensively studied Johann Sebastian Bach in university, Yamane felt a link between her classical music knowledge and the vampiric themes of the series, so she worked to integrate her style with the rock themes of previous Castlevania games. The development process required that Yamane program the music into the game, on top of composition. As she was already experienced with FM synthesis, she was comfortable doing this. Yamane went on to become a recurring composer for the Castlevania series.

== Release ==
Bloodlines was released worldwide in March 1994. (Note: The game was released in North America on March 17, in Japan on March 18, and in Europe on March 20.) The western version was made more difficult than the Japanese version. Packaging artwork for the North American version was illustrated by Tom duBois, who also designed artwork for other western releases of Konami games. The game underwent censorship during localization to PAL regions. Blood and violent imagery was removed from the game, and the title was changed to Castlevania: The New Generation to keep the word blood out of the game's title.

The game was first re-released as part of the Castlevania Anniversary Collection for Nintendo Switch, PlayStation 4, Windows, and Xbox One in May 2019. It was also included in the Sega Genesis Mini dedicated console released later that year. An unofficial tech demo for the Super NES also exists.

== Reception ==
Reception

Aggregate score
Aggregator	Score
GameRankings	81.88%

Review scores
Publication	Score
Beep! MegaDrive	6.25/10
Computer and Video Games	83/100
Electronic Gaming Monthly	9/10, 8/10, 8/10, 8/10
Famitsu	28/40
Game Informer	8/10, 7.5/10, 8.5/10
Game Players	88%
GameFan	98%, 95%, 94%, 96%
GamesMaster	70/100
Hyper	79%
Mean Machines Sega	90/100
Electronic Games	A−
Max Overload!	72%
Mega	82%
Mega Machines	70/100
MegaTech	83/100
Sega Magazine	86/100
Sega Power	70%
Sega Pro	84%
Sega Zone	85%
VideoGames	8/10

According to Famitsu, Castlevania: Bloodlines sold 9,354 copies during its lifetime in Japan. The Japanese publication Micom BASIC Magazine ranked the game third in popularity in its June 1994 issue, and it received a 21.7/30 score in a poll conducted by Mega Drive Fan and a 7.4173/10 score in a 1995 readers' poll conducted by the Japanese Sega Saturn Magazine, ranking among Sega Mega Drive titles at the number 221 spot. It also received generally favorable reception from critics, holding a rating of 81.88% based on four reviews according to review aggregator GameRankings.

GamesRadar named Castlevania: Bloodlines the 8th best Genesis game of all time out of a list of 25. Game Informer's Tim Turi praised the level of gore relative to other Castlevania titles at the time. He also called it "one of the most overlooked treasures in the franchise." In a 1997 Castlevania retrospective, GamePro said that while the graphics and sound were not as impressive as those of Super Castlevania IV, it was a strong game by Genesis standards.

=== Legacy ===
The game's story was later continued in Castlevania: Portrait of Ruin (2006), which is set after the events of Bloodlines and revisits characters and elements from the earlier game. Composer Michiru Yamane recalled that the development team asked her to arrange one of the pieces she had originally composed for Bloodlines for use in Portrait of Ruin.

In October 2021, Bloodlines was included among the launch titles for the Nintendo Switch Online's Sega Genesis library, available through the Nintendo Switch Online + Expansion Pack subscription.
