= SCIV =

SCIV may refer to:

- Super Castlevania IV, a video game
- Soulcalibur IV, a video game
