= Castlevania: Rondo of Blood =

1993 video game

- Japanese cover art
- Developer: Konami
- Publisher: Konami
- Director: Toru Hagihara
- Producer: Yoshiaki Yamada
- Programmers: Toru Hagihara; Shingo Takatsuka
- Artists: Toshiharu Furukawa; Reika Bando; Koji Yamada
- Composers: Akira Souji; Keizo Nakamura; Tomoko Sano; Mikio Saito
- Series: Castlevania
- Platform: PC Engine Super CD-ROM²
- Release: JP: October 29, 1993
- Genre: Platform
- Mode: Single-player

Castlevania: Rondo of Blood, originally released in Japan as Akumajō Dracula X: Chi no Rondo, (Note: Japanese: 悪魔城ドラキュラX 血の輪廻(ロンド), Hepburn: Akumajō Dorakyura Ekkusu: Chi no Rondo; lit. "Demon Castle Dracula X: Rondo of Blood") is a 1993 platform game developed by Konami and released for the PC Engine Super CD-ROM² system directed by Toru Hagihara. Part of the Castlevania series, protagonist Richter Belmont goes to save his lover Annette, who was abducted by Dracula. It was first released exclusively in Japan on October 29, 1993. A direct sequel, Castlevania: Symphony of the Night, was released worldwide in 1997.

The game was remade for the Super Nintendo Entertainment System as Castlevania: Dracula X in 1995, and the PlayStation Portable as Castlevania: The Dracula X Chronicles in 2007. In 2008, the original game was released for the Wii's Virtual Console service in Japan and for the North American and PAL regions in 2010. In 2018, the game was included along with Symphony of the Night within the Castlevania Requiem collection for the PlayStation 4. The title is also playable on the TurboGrafx-16 Mini. In 2021, Limited Run Games announced an English release for the TurboDuo, but it has not yet been released. The game later served as the basis for the animated series Castlevania: Nocturne (2023–2025) on Netflix, a sequel to Castlevania (2017–2021).

== Gameplay ==
The player character Richter Belmont can use the Item Crash ability to fight enemies.

The goal is to guide the player character Richter Belmont through nine stages, with four alternate routes, as he searches for his kidnapped beloved Annette and ultimately confronts Dracula in his castle. Richter makes use of a whip as his main weapon and one of six sub-weapons: an axe, a dagger, a bible, a pocket watch, a cross, and holy water. While exploring the castle, Richter can rescue four maidens, including his distant relative Maria Renard, who then becomes a playable character. She attacks using her doves and one of six sub-weapons: a white tiger kitten, dragon whelp, baby phoenix, turtle, egg or musical notes. The first four of these sub-weapons are based upon the four symbols of Chinese mythology. She is additionally more agile, can perform a double jump, and can deal twice the amount of damage that Richter does in each normal attack. However, she takes much more damage each time she is hit. Maria is also capable of doing a special attack called a "Guardian Knuckle", resulting in a ghostly projection that causes heavy damage to enemies.

Rondo of Blood incorporates elements from the earlier Castlevania games that typically featured linear gameplay and a member of the Belmont clan as the protagonist, and the later entries which emphasized untimed exploration of the environment. Rondo of Blood makes use of untimed stages with a clear beginning, but more than one ending to some levels. This will have an effect on the subsequent environment, monsters, and boss monster that the player character encounters at the end of the level. Items such as money, hearts, and food can be found scattered throughout the areas. Rondo of Blood also has the Item Crash ability reused in subsequent Castlevania titles, which allows a sub-weapon to be used in a super attack. Its direct sequel, Castlevania: Symphony of the Night, reuses many of the monsters. A secret minigame, Akumajyo Dracula Peke, can be played if the system is missing the required Super System Card; it appears as a hidden unlockable in all re-releases of the game.The game has two different paths; the second path consists of five hidden stages and is essential for achieving 100% completion, rescuing all the maiden prisoners, and obtaining the best ending. In the original PC Engine version, however, Stage 5' (Shudder) is only accessible after beating the game at least once.

== Plot ==
Taking place in 1792, the story centers around the eternal conflict between the vampire hunters of the Belmont Clan and the immortal vampire Dracula, who has once again been resurrected. The protagonist is 19-year-old Richter Belmont (Jin Horikawa / David Vincent), heir to the whip "Vampire Killer" and Simon Belmont's direct descendant. He comes to the castle after his beloved Annette (Atsuko Honda / Jessica Straus) is kidnapped by Dracula's servant, Shaft (Jin Horikawa / Tony Oliver), as bait for a trap. Richter makes his way through Dracula's castle, defeating his minions, including the spirit of Death, a headless knight, and a minotaur, all of whom attempt to stop Richter. Along the way, Richter can free various women kidnapped by Dracula's servants to feed him, including his distant relative Maria Renard (Yōko Teppōzuka / Michelle Ruff), an orphaned 12-year-old who insists on joining him; Terra (Hiromi Murata / Karen Strassman), a nun that mistakes him for a manifestation of God; Iris (Akie Yasuda / Karen Strassman), the daughter of the village doctor; and finally Annette. After vanquishing Shaft, (Note: In the remake, an alternate boss battle can occur against the vampiric Annette if Richter fails to rescue her in time) Richter confronts Dracula (Hiroya Ishimaru / Patrick Seitz) and defeats him before exposing him to sunlight, causing him to vanish. Dracula's castle then collapses into the sea as Richter escapes on horseback.

== Development ==
Rondo of Blood is the tenth installment of the Castlevania video game series (hence the Japanese title). Produced by Konami, Rondo of Blood originally saw only a Japanese release on the PC Engine on October 29, 1993. A port was later released on the Wii for the Japanese Virtual Console on April 22, 2008. As an import, it became available in North America on March 15, 2010, and in the PAL region (Europe and Australia) on March 19, 2010.

== Audio ==
Rondo of Blood makes use of Red Book Audio along with the onboard soundchip, allowing for better musical quality. The songs from Rondo of Blood, "Overture", "Beginning" and "Opus 13", appeared on a pre-order bonus CD for the 2006 Nintendo DS game Castlevania: Portrait of Ruin.

Konami Style published the two-disc soundtrack of the remake of the game, Castlevania: The Dracula X Chronicles, on November 8, 2007. The songs "Vampire Killer", "Beginning", "Cemetery", and "Divine Bloodlines" were rearranged. It also included a bonus track of an English-language version of "Nocturne" from Symphony of the Night. The Dracula X Chronicles includes an option which allows players to choose songs from Rondo of Blood and Symphony of the Night to play in the background. These songs are found in the form of records hidden within the game.

== Remakes and re-releases ==
=== Castlevania: Dracula X ===
Castlevania: Dracula X (Note: Known in Japan as Akumajō Dracula XX (悪魔城ドラキュラXX, Akumajō Dorakyura Daburu Ekkusu; lit. Demon Castle Dracula XX) and in Europe as Castlevania: Vampire's Kiss) was developed for the Super Nintendo Entertainment System. While the plot is similar to Rondo of Blood and uses many of that game's graphics, it features all-new levels and altered gameplay elements instead of being a straight port due to the limitations of the cartridge format and PC Engine exclusivity obligations. It was released on July 21, 1995 in Japan, September 1995 in the US, February 22, 1996 in Europe, and on June 22, 1996 in Australia.

Dracula X was also released as a Wii U Virtual Console download in Japan on April 23, 2014, in North America on October 2, 2014, and the PAL regions on November 13, 2014. It was released again for New Nintendo 3DS Virtual Console download in North America on December 29, 2016, and in Europe and Australia on January 26, 2017. The game was included in the Castlevania Advance Collection, released on September 23, 2021, for the Nintendo Switch, PlayStation 4, Xbox One and Windows.

=== Castlevania: The Dracula X Chronicles ===
Castlevania: The Dracula X Chronicles (Note: known in Japan as Akumajō Dracula: X-Chronicles (悪魔城ドラキュラ Xクロニクル, Akumajō Dorakyura Ekkusu Kuronikuru; lit. Demon Castle Dracula: X-Chronicles)) is a 2.5D remake of Rondo of Blood for the PlayStation Portable. Gameplay in the remake remains largely unchanged from Rondo of Blood. Ports of the original PC Engine game (with both Japanese and English voices) and its sequel, Symphony of the Night can be unlocked through gameplay. Symphony of the Night now includes the option to play as Maria (by using a secret name code after beating the game as Alucard), as well as redone scripts, sound effects, and new voice acting. It also has the option to play with the original Japanese voices, which is unchanged in this port.

The Dracula X Chronicles was released in North America on October 23, 2007, in Japan on November 8, 2007, in Europe on February 15, 2008, and in Australia & New Zealand on April 9, 2008. In 2008, the North American edition was re-released as part of the "Greatest Hits" label while the Japanese edition was re-released on July 15, 2010, under the "Best Selection" label. The game was added to the PlayStation Network in Europe in June 2014, as a PSP-only release (the game is already compatible with the PS Vita).

=== Castlevania Requiem ===
Rondo of Blood is included within the Castlevania Requiem compilation for PlayStation 4, along with its sequel, Symphony of the Night. Both titles are based on the retranslated versions featured in The Dracula X Chronicles, though only the PC Engine version of Rondo of Blood is included. The compilation was released on October 26, 2018.

== Reception ==
Reception

Review scores
Publication	Score
AllGame	4.5/5
Edge	8/10
Famitsu	9/10, 6/10, 7/10, 6/10
GameFan	98%, 97%, 98%, 95%
Gekkan PC Engine	95/100, 90/100, 95/100, 90/100, 95/100
IGN	9/10
Jeuxvideo.com	16/20
M! Games	8/10
Nintendo Life	9/10
Dengeki PC Engine	95/100, 90/100, 90/100, 95/100
Hippon Super!	8/10
Megablast	83%
Oprainfall	4.5/5
Vandal	9/10

According to Famitsu, Castlevania: Rondo of Blood sold over 14,436 copies in its first week and 19,616 copies in its first month on the market in Japan. The Japanese publication Micom BASIC Magazine ranked the game first in popularity in its January 1994 issue, and it received a 26.0/30 score in a readers' poll conducted by PC Engine Fan. Rondo of Blood received generally favorable reviews from critics.

GamePro's Matthew Taylor said that "Declaring Dracula X to be the greatest Castlevania of all time would be a slap at Castlevania IV for the SNES, but earmarking X as one of the ten best side-scrollers of all time is a no-brainer". Electronic Gaming Monthly said it "can easily be the best CD title yet", and argued that the only negative aspect was the game not being released in the United States. They later awarded the game Best Japanese Action Game of 1994.

Nintendo Life's Corbie Dillard praised the game's level design, soundtrack, graphics, and difficulty level. IGN awarded the Virtual Console release its "Editors' Choice", describing it as enjoyable and "worth the wait".

== In other media ==
Following the release of the final season of the original Castlevania animated series on May 13, 2021, that was based on Castlevania III: Dracula's Curse, Netflix announced a follow-up series which is to be set in France during the French Revolution in 1792 with Richter Belmont and Maria Renard in the lead roles. At 2022's Netflix's Geeked Week virtual event, the series was revealed to be titled Castlevania: Nocturne alongside a teaser trailer featuring Richter. The first season was released on September 28, 2023, while the second season premiered on January 16, 2025.
