= Castlevania: The Arcade =

2009 video game

- UK arcade flyer
- Developer: Konami
- Publisher: Konami
- Directors: Hiroyuki Ashida; Tatsumi Sugiura
- Producers: Masayuki Ohashi; Kazuya Tominaga
- Artist: Noriaki Isogai
- Composers: Masahiro Ikariko; Masayuki Maruyama; Goh Fujiwara
- Series: Castlevania
- Platform: Arcade
- Release: JP: February 2009; EU: 2009
- Genre: Light gun shooter
- Modes: Single-player, multiplayer

Castlevania: The Arcade, released in Japan as Akumajō Dracula: The Arcade (悪魔城ドラキュラ THE ARCADE, Demon Castle Dracula: The Arcade), is an arcade game, part of the Castlevania franchise by Konami. The game was announced on July 23, 2008. The game was released in Japan on October 2, 2009. A European release was announced for 2009 but only appeared at test locations in 2008.

The games whip control and button layout resembled a heavier version of a Wii remote.

== Gameplay ==
The gameplay is similar to light gun shooters such as The House of the Dead. Players utilize a special LED whip remote. The remote has two buttons. A top thumb button used to activate the whip, prompting players to swing the remote at the screen to damage enemies. A bottom button for the index finger is used to activate subweapons, such as knives or crosses. Subweapons are refilled by collecting hearts (up to 25) strewn about each stage in the form of destructible candles and wooden crates.

Up to two players can play the game at once. Characters in the game include the Vampire Hunter, the Lady Gunner, and the Little Witch.

== Audio ==
Castlevania: The Arcade's soundtrack was released on Akumajou Dracula Best Music Collections Box, an 18-CD box set containing music from many Castlevania titles. The Arcade's music was featured on Disc 17.
