= Castlevania: The Adventure ReBirth =

2009 video game

- Cover art
- Developer: M2
- Publisher: Konami
- Directors: Toshiyasu Kamiko; Akihiro Minakata; Keisuke Koga
- Producer: Koji Igarashi
- Designer: Keisuke Koga
- Composer: Manabu Namiki
- Series: Castlevania
- Platform: WiiWare
- Release: JP: October 27, 2009; NA: December 28, 2009; PAL: February 26, 2010
- Genre: Platform
- Mode: Single-player

Castlevania: The Adventure ReBirth (Note: Dorakyura Densetsu: ReBirth (ドラキュラ伝説 ReBirth; The Legend of Dracula ReBirth)) is a 2009 platform game developed by M2 and released by Konami for the Wii as a WiiWare title. It is a remake of the 1989 Game Boy title Castlevania: The Adventure and is the third game in M2's ReBirth series, following Gradius ReBirth and Contra ReBirth. The setting of the game is a century before the original Castlevania title, where the player controls an ancestor of Simon Belmont named Christopher Belmont, who must defeat the vampire Dracula.

== Gameplay ==
The player-character Christopher can collect whip upgrades, with the last one allowing him to shoot fire balls.

The Adventure ReBirth consists of six areas that the player has to complete in order to finish the game. Toward the end of each area is a boss the player has to defeat before advancing to the next stage.

The player's main weapon for attacking in-game enemies is a whip, which can upgraded by collecting orbs. The last upgrade lets the player shoot fire from Christopher's whip for a short duration. Unlike the original Adventure title for the Game Boy, there are sub-weapons which are powered with items called hearts. There are five sub-weapons and each has a different use.

== Audio ==
The game's soundtrack was composed by Manabu Namiki, who worked on the other titles in the ReBirth series. The music consists of remixes of previous Castlevania tracks. The official album was released on March 24, 2010 in a compilation with Contra ReBirth's music.

== Reception ==
Reception

Aggregate scores
Aggregator	Score
GameRankings	81.10%
Metacritic	78/100

The Adventure ReBirth garnered positive reviews, achieving a Metacritic score of 78/100 based on 22 critic reviews. Game Informer's Tim Turi praised its audio and noted that it was a better game than Castlevania: The Adventure though still felt it was "unforgiving". In 2011, Robert Workman of GameZone ranked it as the 10th best Castlevania game and complimented Konami for making this game in light of Castlevania: Lords of Shadow.
