= Castlevania: Circle of the Moon =

2001 video game

- North American box art depicting the main protagonist, Nathan Graves
- Developer: Konami Computer Entertainment Kobe
- Publisher: Konami
- Director: Kōji Horie
- Producers: Kōji Horie; Min Wa
- Designer: Kōji Horie
- Programmers: Koji Yoshida; Yoshiki Domae
- Artist: Kazuko Fujihara
- Composers: Sōtarō Tojima; Hiroshi Mitsuoka
- Series: Castlevania
- Platform: Game Boy Advance
- Release: JP: March 21, 2001; NA: June 11, 2001; PAL: June 22, 2001
- Genres: Action role-playing, Metroidvania
- Mode: Single-player

Castlevania: Circle of the Moon, (Note: Known in Japan as Akumajō Dracula: Circle of the Moon (Japanese: 悪魔城ドラキュラ サークル オブ ザ ムーン, Hepburn: Akumajō Dorakyura: Sākuru obu za Mūn; Demon Castle Dracula: Circle of the Moon)) titled Castlevania in PAL regions, is a 2001 action role-playing game developed and published by Konami for the Game Boy Advance handheld game console. The game was developed as a stand-alone title in the Castlevania series and as a launch title for the Game Boy Advance.

The game's plot follows a vampire hunter named Nathan Graves as he attempts to rescue his mentor from the clutches of Dracula. Following the Metroidvania style of gameplay established by Castlevania: Symphony of the Night, Circle of the Moon expands on the magic attack mechanics of the former with the Dual Set-Up System, which allows for attacks to be mixed and matched by players as they see fit.

The game sold 500,000 units worldwide and received critical acclaim, with praise for its level design, mechanics, music, and scope. Circle of the Moon was re-released as part of the Castlevania Advance Collection on September 23, 2021, for the Nintendo Switch, PlayStation 4, Windows, and Xbox One alongside Castlevania: Harmony of Dissonance, Castlevania: Aria of Sorrow, and Castlevania: Dracula X.

== Gameplay ==
The Dual Set-Up System allows the player to customize how they cast magic attacks. Here, the system is being applied to Nathan Graves's (center) whip, giving it fire properties, in order to make his attack against the enemy (right) more powerful.

Similarly to Castlevania: Symphony of the Night, Circle of the Moon is a 2D Metroidvania that features side-scrolling action with an emphasis on exploration and combat. Role-playing game elements like leveling character statistics and collecting equipment that augment those statistics are also present. Players traverse an abandoned castle with the end goal of defeating Dracula. As the main protagonist—Nathan Graves—progresses through the castle, he learns new skills and acquires equipment and items that allow further exploration in the game. Like previous Castlevania titles prior to Symphony of the Night, Nathan primarily uses a whip to attack enemies alongside secondary weapons, which require ammo to be used.

A unique gameplay feature is the Dual Set-Up System (DSS), which allows players to customize their magic attacks. DSS is based around a series of cards, categorized as either an Action or Attribute card, which are dropped by enemies randomly. When an Action and Attribute card are paired, a variety of different effects can occur that, when activated, can either offer a passive effect or temporarily increase Nathan's offensive or defensive statistics. There are a total of twenty cards that can be obtained, ten for each category, making for a total of 100 different DSS combinations.

=== Alternate modes ===
Circle of the Moon features four alternate modes of gameplay available by inputting a code on the file select screen. The codes "Fireball", "Gradius", "Crossbow", and "Dagger" unlock "Magician Mode", "Fighter Mode", "Shooter Mode" and "Thief Mode" respectively. (Note: The alternate mode codes will not work until the prior mode has first been completed. This cycle starts as soon as the player has completed the game normally.) The alternate modes do not change the player character or explorable area in any way, but instead alters Nathan's statistics. Magician Mode starts Nathan with decreased offensive and defensive statistics, but begins with an increased intelligence stat and all DSS cards. Fighter Mode does not permit the use of DSS cards, but increases Nathan's strength and endurance stats. Shooter Mode allows a larger amount of secondary weapon ammo to be carried, but decreases offensive, defensive and health stats. Thief Mode reduces Nathan's offensive and defensive stats, but increases his luck statistic greatly.

== Plot and setting ==
Circle of the Moon takes place in the fictional universe of the Castlevania series. The series premise is the eternal conflict between the vampire hunters of the Belmont clan and the immortal vampire Dracula. The game is set in 1830 Europe, and its story unfolds in an old castle on the outskirts of the Austrian Empire.

=== Characters ===
The game features some returning characters from previous titles, however most of the cast of characters are new to the series, such as the main protagonist: Nathan Graves. Nathan wields the powerful Hunter Whip, which was passed down to him by his mentor, Morris Baldwin. Assisting Nathan is Hugh Baldwin, Morris's son, who trained alongside Nathan but is also envious of him because he wields the Hunter Whip, which Hugh feels should be his by birthright.

Similar to other Castlevania titles, the main villain is Dracula who serves as the game's final boss. Also returning from prior titles in the series is Camilla, a vampiress and loyal servant to Dracula who revels in restoring his full power.

=== Story ===
A decade prior to the start of the game, Nathan's parents and Morris Baldwin attempt to banish Dracula. Nathan's parents perish in the conflict, but Dracula is successfully sealed away. In present day, Morris has trained Nathan and Hugh in combat in order to prepare them for whenever Dracula reawakens. At the beginning of the game, Camilla successfully manages to reawaken Dracula, however she is interrupted by the arrival of Nathan, Hugh, and Morris. Before they are able to react, Dracula destroys the floor under Nathan and Hugh, causing them to plummet down to the castle's catacombs. Both of them survive the fall and the two realize that they must find Morris. Wishing to find his father, Hugh leaves Nathan behind, believing that Nathan would just get in the way. Undeterred, Nathan proceeds to search the castle for his mentor.

Exploring the castle, Nathan learns that at the next full moon, Morris' soul will be used to return Dracula to full power. He also periodically encounters Hugh, who becomes more hostile as the game progresses. Eventually, Nathan encounters Camilla, who hints that she and Dracula are responsible for the changes in his personality. Nathan vanquishes Camilla in her true form and meets up with Hugh once more. Upon seeing him, Hugh immediately attacks him with the goal of proving himself to his father through Nathan's defeat; Nathan, however, realizes that Dracula is controlling Hugh. Nathan defeats him, and Dracula's control over Hugh breaks. Hugh confesses that he doubted his self-worth when Nathan was chosen as successor and tasks him with Morris' rescue.

Arriving at the ceremonial room, Nathan confronts Dracula, who confirms that he had tampered with Hugh's soul to cause the changes in his personality. They begin to fight and halfway through, Dracula teleports away to gain his full power. Hugh then frees his father and tasks Nathan with Dracula's banishment. Nathan continues the battle and defeats Dracula; escaping the collapsing castle, he reunites with Morris and Hugh. Nathan is declared a master vampire hunter by Morris. Hugh vows to retrain under Morris due to his failure.

== Development and release ==
Developed by Konami Computer Entertainment Kobe, Circle of the Moon was designed as a launch title for the Game Boy Advance. First announced at Space World 2000, the game was later shown off at the Autumn 2000 Tokyo Game Show alongside a demo playable to the gaming press. GameSpot staff claimed that Hugh Baldwin was playable in the demo alongside Nathan Graves, however this seems to be a misconception as it was stated that additional characters couldn't be selected and screenshots of the demo feature Nathan prominently. Later in May 2001, after the game had launched on March 21, 2001 in Japan, the game was shown off in North America for the first time at E3 2001 alongside a playable demo of the game. Circle of the Moon was later published in North America on June 11, 2001, and in PAL regions on June 22, 2001 as Castlevania.

A press release by Konami on July 23, 2001, mentioned that Circle of the Moon had sold over 500,000 units, with over 300,000 sold in North America and about 200,000 sold in Europe.

== Reception ==
Reception

Aggregate scores
Aggregator	Score
Metacritic	91/100
OpenCritic	83% recommend(As part of the Advance Collection) (Note: Based on 23 reviews.)

Review scores
Publication	Score
AllGame	4.5/5
Electronic Gaming Monthly	9.5/10 (Note: Three critics of Electronic Gaming Monthly gave the game each a score of 10/10, 9/10, and 9.5/10.)
EP Daily	9/10
Eurogamer	9/10
Famitsu	27/40
Game Informer	8.5/10
GameSpot	9.6/10
GameSpy	82%
IGN	9/10
Next Generation	5/5
Nintendo Life	8/10
Nintendo Power	5/5
RPGamer	7/10
RPGFan	94%

Award
Publication	Award
IGN	Editors' Choice

Circle of the Moon received "universal acclaim" from critics, according to review aggregator Metacritic.

Japanese gaming magazine Famitsu gave the game a 27 out of 40 score. Craig Harris of IGN called Circle of the Moon "one of the best playing Castlevania games released", calling the gameplay "very long and extremely challenging without being frustrating or a chore to zip through". However, they noted that due to the dark graphics, the game was "difficult" to see, and that the character animations looked as though "they've been ripped out of a GBC development". Michael "Major Mike" Weigand of GamePro said that the game closely mirrored the most highly acclaimed Castlevania game, Symphony of the Night with its rich graphics and branching story. (Note: GamePro gave the game two 4.5/5 scores for graphics and sound, and two 5/5 scores for control and fun factor.) RPGamer also praised the new system, calling it a "breath of fresh air" when combined with the existing ideas from previous entries in the series, though in contrast felt the game had significant replay value due to its various additional modes and the strengths/weaknesses related to each that required new strategies. Despite their criticism of the plot and recycled elements, they summarized the title as "Konami's Second Symphony". GameSpy stated that while the graphics were a problem, they more readily attributed the issue to the Game Boy Advance itself than the game, adding "it's a horror game about Dracula, don't you want ample light around you anyway?" They also praised the game's music and sound effects as appropriate for the title, though they criticized the lack of decent artificial intelligence on the part of the enemies. NextGen called it "one of the best 2D action-adventure games ever made – for any platform." However, Edge gave the Japanese import seven out of ten, saying, "There is little of note that can be considered new, and yet the balance of play is as strong as ever – Konami's original formula shines through, a mix of quality platforming, fine graphics and undeniable branding. Age has not withered the mix at all." Game Informer's Tim Turi felt in the game's retrospective that it was the first game to imitate Symphony of the Night's style but criticized the dark visuals.

Several gaming publications nominated Circle of the Moon with awards and distinctions. The game was nominated for "Best Action-Adventure Game" and "Best Game Boy Advance Game" at GameSpot's Best and Worst of 2001 Awards, both of which went to Grand Theft Auto III and Advance Wars, respectively. It was also a nominee for "Console Role-Playing Game of the Year" at the AIAS' 5th Annual Interactive Achievement Awards, which was ultimately awarded to Baldur's Gate: Dark Alliance. The game was also nominated at The Electric Playground's 2001 Blister Awards for "Portable Game of the Year", but lost to Advance Wars.

== Legacy ==
Despite the game's success, series producer Koji Igarashi, who had not been involved in its production, was critical of the game. When developing follow-up title Castlevania: Harmony of Dissonance, he cited in an interview several flaws he felt should have been rectified in Circle of the Moon's design, primarily its control scheme and the dark appearance of the graphics on the Game Boy Advance. He additionally criticized the DSS card system, stating that it "did not match with the world Castlevania had established over a long period of time", though admitted he felt it was a good system. In 2002, Circle of the Moon was removed from the series' timeline, a move met with some resistance from fans. Igarashi noted the reason for the removal was not due to his non-involvement with the game, but instead the intention of the game's development team for Circle of the Moon to be a stand-alone title.

The game later saw a Japanese-only re-release under the "Konami the Best" label on November 3, 2005. It was published on the Wii U Virtual Console on October 9, 2014, in North America.
