= Castlevania (1999 video game) =

1999 video game

- North American cover art
- Developer: Konami Computer Entertainment Kobe
- Publisher: Konami
- Director: Yuji Shibata
- Producers: Etsunobu Ebisu; Shigeru Umezaki
- Composers: Masahiko Kimura; Motoaki Furukawa; Mariko Egawa
- Series: Castlevania
- Platform: Nintendo 64
- Release: NA: January 26, 1999; JP: March 11, 1999; EU: May 14, 1999
- Genres: Action-adventure, platform
- Mode: Single-player

Castlevania, (Note: Known in Japan as Demon Castle Dracula: Apocalypse (Japanese: 悪魔城(あくまじょう)ドラキュラ黙示録(もくしろく), Hepburn: Akumajō Dorakyura Mokushiroku)) also informally referred to as Castlevania 64, is a 1999 action-adventure game developed and published by Konami for the Nintendo 64. An expanded version of the game, Castlevania: Legacy of Darkness, was released later in the same year.

Castlevania is the first 3D game in the Castlevania series. The player selects one of the game's protagonists to control: Carrie Fernandez, a young orphan gifted with magic powers, or Reinhardt Schneider, the whip-wielding heir to the Belmont clan (the series' recurring protagonists). Carrie and Reinhardt set out on a quest to stop Count Dracula's impending return to power after a century of dormancy. The characters travel to and explore Dracula's grand estate in their mission to defeat the count and his horde of undead minions.

== Gameplay ==
The player character Reinhardt can jump between 3D platforms to traverse areas. The GUI displays the time of day, which has an effect on the gameplay.

Castlevania, like most of its predecessors, is primarily an action-adventure and platforming game. The Japanese logo for the game includes the words "real action adventure" in English.

Combat is slightly more complex than in older entries. A basic targeting and lock-on system has been implemented. Players have the use of both a long-range attack (the whip for Reinhardt, homing energy balls for Carrie) and a close-quarters attack (dagger and rings respectively). Each weapon has strengths and weaknesses. For example, the Cerberus hounds can outrun Carrie's orbs, and Reinhardt must jump to land blows when fighting the vampire in the Castle Keep. Both characters can acquire sub-weapons, of which only one can be used at a time. In past Castlevania titles they were powered by red hearts, but in this game are instead powered by red jewels. The sub-weapons are series mainstays: the axe, knife, cross, and holy water.

A large part of the game's challenge is also based on jumping from platform to platform while avoiding environmental hazards such as enemies and traps. Platforms are usually stationary, but some may rotate out from under the player, move through the environment like a rail shooter (the gondola in the Tunnel level), and crumble or fall away underfoot. There are also some invisible platforms that either afford players a strategic advantage or lead to hidden items.

Castlevania includes elements from the survival horror game genre. In addition to the trappings and narrative devices of Gothic horror, players are often placed in situations that may evoke feelings of stress, anxiety, and vulnerability. Players may be trapped in caged fights with monsters, such as the battle with the Cerberus hounds in the Villa when the screen darkens to near-black. Some caged battles are timed, such as the boss battles in the Duel Tower level, where the gamer will be crushed by a falling ceiling should they not best their enemy in time. Vampires are also often fought in caged environments, with the added complication that they can latch onto Carrie and Reinhardt to suck their blood. If the player doesn't break free by rapidly rotating the control stick, the character's status changes to "vamp" and they will not be able to use their primary weapon or healing items. Unless a specific item is used to recover, the game becomes much more challenging. Castlevania also features two other survival horror sequences: In the Villa's maze garden, players must follow Malus through the labyrinthine hedges while strong, unbeatable enemies give chase. In the Castle Center, players must carefully carry the "magic nitro" item through an obstacle course to its destination. One jump, fall, or hit will cause the volatile chemical to explode, resulting in immediate death.

Although progression through the game is relatively linear, with characters unable to revisit completed levels, there is also an emphasis on exploration. Most levels require only occasional backtracking, and are relatively straightforward in how players progress. The Villa and Castle Center levels, however, are sprawling environments that require in-depth exploration. This element of exploration and discovery is strengthened by the fact that there is no in-game map, requiring players to rely on memory alone to navigate. Occasionally boss battles will not occur at end of a level, but rather in the middle or even at the beginning (such as in first level, where players must fight a boss moments after starting the game). The Duel Tower level consists only of boss battles. Both styles of levels include light puzzle-solving, such as the astronomical puzzle in the Castle Center's planetarium. Puzzle solving often involves non-player characters such as Charlie Vincent, Rosa, and the lizard man. Conversations with these characters may yield insights or items necessary to progress in the game.

Castlevania features an internal clock that results in a day/night cycle. In a few choice areas the time of day will affect events in the story: characters may not appear or be unwilling to talk at a certain time of day. For example, in the Villa level players must meet Rosa at sunrise in the rose garden and Charlie Vincent will be asleep at night. Also, if the player takes 16 or more in-game days to beat the game, the game will give them a bad ending in which Dracula and his dark forces prevail. The time of day also affects whether or not the player can access certain areas of the game. Doors sealed by magic and bearing a sun or moon crest can only be opened during the corresponding time of day. Additionally, timed events can occur which grant access to secrets, such as the pillar in the Villa's courtyard fountain. Players can use sun cards to advance the time to sunrise (6 AM) and moon cards to sunset (6 PM). Finally, the strength of certain enemies can fluctuate based on the time of day. For example, vampires are much harder to defeat at night than during the day.

Castlevania has different settings to adjust the challenge posed by the game. In "easy mode", the player will only be able to play until the end of the Castle Center level, at which time the game will prompt them to try "normal mode" to advance to the subsequent stages. Upon fulfilling certain conditions "hard mode" will be unlocked. In this mode enemies take more hits to defeat and subweapons require more red jewel points to use (e.g. 2 jewel points for the knife instead of 1).

Currency, in the form of moneybags, can be used to purchase items that are not dropped by enemies or found hidden in the environments. The heroes may also need to battle Renon, the demon salesman, should they spend too much. An inventory on the pause screen displays items, such as health-restoring meat, restorative ampoules, keys, etc.

The North American and PAL versions of the cartridge do not have a built-in save feature; all saved games are stored on a memory card (the Controller Pak) attached to the Nintendo 64's controller. Players save their in-game progress by using white jewel items scattered throughout the levels, which must be touched to activate and can be used indefinitely.

== Plot ==
Dracula reawakens in 1852, after nearly a hundred years of enforced slumber, as a result of humankind's descent into vice and wickedness. Two young heroes sense his return: Carrie Fernandez, a girl gifted with magic powers, and Reinhardt Schneider, heir to the ancient Belmont clan of vampire hunters. The two set out to storm the Count's castle in the Transylvanian province of Wallachia and vanquish him.

As they penetrate the castle walls, an aristocratic vampire appears to warn Carrie and Reinhardt that "all who oppose the Dark Lord will die". The two then come upon a decrepit villa, where they meet the elderly vampire hunter Charles Vincent, beautiful yet unwilling vampire Rosa, demonic salesman Renon, and young boy Malus. Beneath the estate's maze garden lies a subterranean path to the castle's center, where Dracula's servants (Actrise and Death) attempt to waylay the heroes by pitting them in battle against their loved ones (the Fernandez warrior and Rosa).

Carrie kills her vampirized kin while Reinhardt beats Rosa in combat. The heroes then climb several of the castle's towers before confronting Actrise and Death atop the Room of Clocks. With their defeat, the heroes climb the Clock Tower to the Castle Keep.

If the hero took sixteen or more "in-game" days to reach the second chamber on the stairs to the Castle Keep, Vincent will have arrived before them, been defeated by the aristocratic vampire assumed to be Dracula and turned into a vampire (thus triggering the bad ending). The hero will then have to battle Vincent. Without Vincent's later intercession, the hero will not discover that Malus was indeed Dracula reincarnate – not simply possessed by him – and receive one of the bad endings in which the hero rescues the boy.

If the player took fifteen or fewer days to reach the second chamber on the stairs to the Castle Keep, they will arrive before Charles Vincent (thus triggering the good ending). After fighting the vampire disguised as Dracula, they will battle Malus, who transforms into an adult. After his defeat atop the Clock Tower, Malus will regain the form of a child. Attempting to dupe the hero, he will pretend to have no recollection of the battle, but Vincent will arrive and douse the boy with holy water. Vincent explains that Malus was not possessed, but was in fact Dracula reincarnate. Malus then transports the hero to an alternate realm to battle his true form, a centipedal dragon. After Dracula's defeat, the player will receive one of the good endings: in Carrie's ending, she places a nosegay on her stepmother's grave. In Reinhardt's ending, Rosa, who sacrificed herself for him atop the Room of Clocks, is revived and her humanity restored.

== Development ==
A model of Camilla, a recurring Castlevania villain, in an early development screenshot

Castlevania made its first public appearance in the form of a "sneak peek" at the April 1997 Tokyo Game Show, under the title Castlevania 64. Later in development at Konami Computer Entertainment Kobe (KCEK), it became known as Dracula 3D. United States news media referred to the game by this title as well as Dracula 64.

In September 1997, the game was approximately 10% finished and was 20% complete in February 1998. In October 1998 the game was again featured at the Tokyo Game Show; several levels were playable and the game was a hit with the crowd. Later that month, it was revealed that KCEK decided to drop two of the planned four characters from the game "in favor of focusing the programming team's development efforts and moving completion of the game forward." One of the dropped characters was Cornell, a werewolf who uses close-range martial arts. Cornell would become a player character in Castlevania: Legacy of Darkness. Also dropped as the team became aware of how time-consuming development would be were plans for a fighting game-style multiplayer mode.

In January 1999 a Japanese release date was set for March 4, 1999 and Castlevania won the "Game of the Month" award at IGN. On the 18th, it was announced that the U.S. release date for the game would be January 26, 1999. On that date, the game shipped as planned. The Japanese version was released on March 11, 1999.

The character design and artwork was created by Yasuomi Umetsu in an anime style.

Architecture in the game is predominantly inspired by French castles: The Villa's exterior is based on the western façade of the Château d'Azay-le-Rideau in France's Loire Valley, while its interior entrance hall is based on the Grand Hall in the Lancaster House (a mansion in London). The Villa's plantings and hedge maze were inspired by the formal gardens at the Château de Villandry. Dracula's castle drew inspiration from the famous Mont Saint-Michel on the coast of Normandy.

Several elements of the game were designed to allude to past Castlevania titles: Carrie's alternate costume is an homage to Maria Renard's dress in Castlevania: Rondo of Blood, Reinhardt's alternate costume is an homage to Simon Belmont's outfit in the first Castlevania, and the Behemoth boss in the Castle Center can be crippled, a reference to the crawling Behemoth first featured in Rondo of Blood.

=== Audio ===
Tomoya Tomita was the game's sound producer and director, while the music for Castlevania was composed by Masahiko Kimura, Motoaki Furukawa, and Mariko Egawa. Their score is predominantly minimalist and ambient in composition. It features a wide variety of electronic instrumentation, ranging from the period harpsichord to contemporary beat synths. Tomokuni Katayama performed the violin solo, a rendition of "Bloodlines" from Castlevania: Rondo of Blood, that greets the player on the title screen. The soundtrack includes three songs that are remixes from Castlevania: Rondo of Blood.

Castlevania features sporadic voice acting, mainly for the prologue narration and several of the game's main characters. Bianca Allen provided the voice for Carrie, Andrew Hanikson for Reinhardt, Harald Gjerde for Malus, and Scott McCulloch for the Narrator. The PAL version of the game features voice acting for Dracula's servant in the Castle Wall and Castle Keep levels; the North American version did not include the voice work for the latter level.

== Reception ==
Reception

Aggregate scores
Aggregator	Score
GameRankings	73%
Metacritic	78/100

Review scores
Publication	Score
Electronic Gaming Monthly	9/10, 9/10, 9/10, 8/10
Game Informer	6.5 /10
GamePro	4.5/5
GameSpot	8.2/10
IGN	8.2/10
Next Generation	3/5
Gamers' Republic	B

Castlevania received generally positive reviews. It has an average of 78 out of 100 on Metacritic, and 73% at GameRankings. At the release, most critics considered the game to be a good transition to the series, despite many changes in gameplay. GameSpot praised the graphics, audio and gameplay, saying "The developers have done a fantastic job of capturing the atmosphere and spirit of the series, while providing a well-balanced, challenging gameplay experience that's filled with pretty visuals, awesome (though limited) music, plenty of secrets, and some incredible bosses (just wait until you see Death... whew!)", while IGN highlighted the sound better than the graphics, saying "Outstanding sound effects with lots of bass. Good music, even if it's a bit simple at times", and Game Pro said "Is Castlevania fun? It depends on what kind of game you're looking for and how much energy you want to spend playing it. Fans of the old Castlevania will marvel at this version's familiar sites and environments and will appreciate the dedicated tack of the gameplay. Novices will be chilled to the bone at the thought of replaying a huge level after an untimely fall (fortunately, there are numerous save points). Castlevania's a 3D platform spectacle that definitely warrants a good look from N64 owners everywhere—you won't find better hauntings than this one". Gamers' Republic compared it to the previous entry in the series Symphony of the Night, saying it wasn't as good as that game "but it is still enthralling to play nonetheless."

Many reviewers felt that the game was not as good as past entries in the series. Next Generation reviewed the game, rating it three stars out of five, and stated that "the promise within Castlevania is evident in some of the game's stronger features. But overall, the game fails to revitalize a series that has always been so flawlessly defined in two dimensions." Reiner of Game Informer, said that Konami needed to spend more time on the game as the game could have been great with more development time, and it does not compare to past 2D titles in the series.

For additional criticism, reviewers noted a few things. Gamer's Republic noted that there was draw in, and that playing as Carrie made the game too easy and recommended Reinhard instead. Andy of Game Informer, said the game's "evil", not because of the content but the poor animations and "clumsy controls". Cam Shea of Hyper also noted the animations and controls were "stiff".

Retrospective reviews placed the game as a flawed but interesting title. Game Informer's Tim Turi in 2012 felt that it was frustrating and flawed; it had a "special place" for him however due to its "desperate lonely atmosphere."
