= Hiromi Murata =

Japanese actress and voice actress

Hiromi Murata 村田 博美
- Born: January 30, 1965 (age 60); Yokohama, Kanagawa, Japan
- Occupation: Voice actress

Hiromi Murata (村田 博美, Murata Hiromi, born January 30, 1965 in Yokohama, Kanagawa) is a Japanese actress and voice actress.

== Filmography ==
- 1994: It's a Summer Vacation Everyday - Adult voice of Horsetail (voice only)
- 1996: Gamera 2: Attack of Legion - Additional Role - (Kaiju film)

== Voice roles ==
=== Anime ===
- Bigman - Heaven Woman Static
- Eureka Encyclopedia large - Kanako

=== OVA ===
- 2001 Ya Monogatari - Karen

=== Anime films ===
- Legend of the Galactic Heroes - Annerose von Grunewald
- Legend of the Galactic Heroes Golden Wings - Annerose von Grunewald
- Toki no Tabibito -Time Stranger- - Teko Saotome

=== Games ===
- Castlevania: Rondo of Blood - Tera
- Shenmue - Shenhua's Mother
