= Castlevania =

Video game series

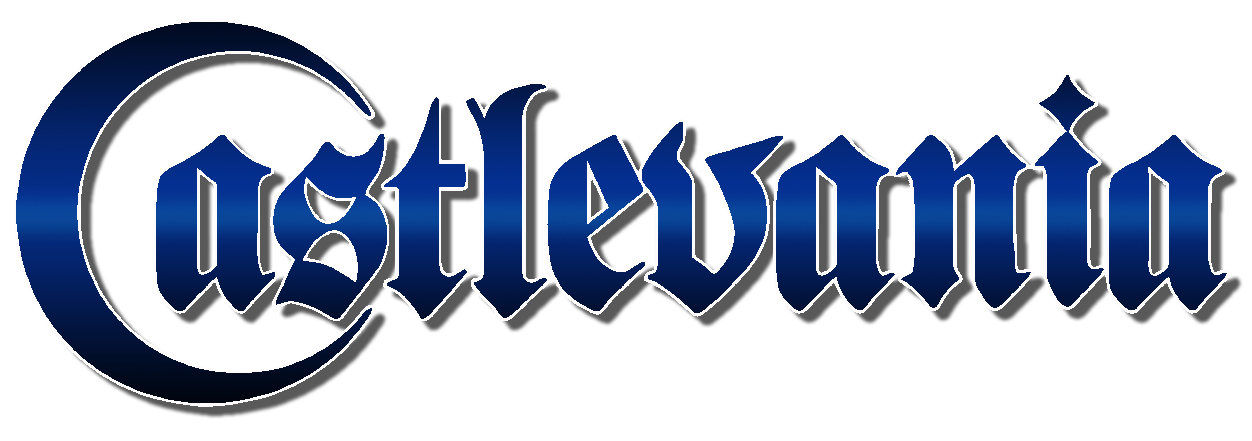
- Logo of the Castlevania series, introduced with 2003's Lament of Innocence
- Genres: Platform; Action role-playing; Metroidvania; Action-adventure; Hack and slash
- Developers: Konami; M2 (2009–2024); MercurySteam (2010–2014); Kojima Productions (2010); Evil Empire (2026); Motion Twin (2026)
- Publisher: Konami
- Creator: Hitoshi Akamatsu
- Platforms: List: Amiga; Android; Arcade; Commodore 64; DOS; Game Boy; Game Boy Color; Game Boy Advance; iOS; MSX2; Nintendo 3DS; Nintendo 64; Nintendo DS; Nintendo Entertainment System; Nintendo Switch; Nintendo Switch 2; PlayStation; PlayStation 2; PlayStation 3; PlayStation 4; PlayStation 5; PlayStation Portable; PlayStation Vita; Sega Genesis; Sega Saturn; Super NES; PC Engine; Wii; Wii U; Windows; X68000; Xbox; Xbox 360; Xbox One; Xbox Series X/S
- First release: Castlevania; September 26, 1986
- Latest release: Castlevania: Belmont's Curse; October 15, 2026

Castlevania (/ˌkæsəlˈveɪniə/), known in Japan as Akumajō Dracula, (Note: Japanese: 悪魔城ドラキュラ, Hepburn: Akumajō Dorakyura; "Demon Castle Dracula") is a gothic horror action-adventure video game series and media franchise created by Konami. The series is largely set in the castle of Count Dracula, the arch-enemy of the Belmont clan of vampire hunters.

Debuting with the 1986 video game on Nintendo's Famicom Disk System, the first entry and the majority of its sequels are side-scrolling action platformers. The 1997 game, Castlevania: Symphony of the Night, originally released for the PlayStation, returned to the nonlinear gameplay first seen in Castlevania II: Simon's Quest, which also introduced role-playing elements and exploration. Several installments later adopted Symphony of the Night's gameplay, which along with Super Metroid, have popularized the Metroidvania genre. 2010 saw the release of Castlevania: Lords of Shadow, a 3D action-adventure game developed by MercurySteam and Kojima Productions that served as a reboot of the series.

The Castlevania series has been released on various platforms; from early systems to modern consoles, as well as handheld devices such as mobile phones. The franchise has since expanded into several spin-off video games and other media; including comic books and a critically acclaimed animated television series.

Spanning four decades, Castlevania is one of Konami's most successful franchises. Retrospectives have attributed the series's success to its blend of action, adventure, and horror elements; and it has been praised for its challenging gameplay mechanics, atmospheric settings, and music.

== Games ==
Release timeline Original series in green Lords of Shadow series in yellow
1986	Castlevania
1986	Vampire Killer
1987	Castlevania II: Simon's Quest
1987	Haunted Castle
1988
1989	Castlevania: The Adventure
1989	Castlevania III: Dracula's Curse
1990
1991	Castlevania II: Belmont's Revenge
1991	Super Castlevania IV
1992
1993	Akumajō Dracula
1993	Castlevania: Rondo of Blood
1994	Castlevania: Bloodlines
1995	Castlevania: Dracula X
1996
1997	Castlevania: Symphony of the Night
1997	Castlevania Legends
1998
1999	Castlevania (Nintendo 64)
1999	Castlevania: Legacy of Darkness
2000
2001	Castlevania: Circle of the Moon
2001	Castlevania Chronicles
2002	Castlevania: Harmony of Dissonance
2003	Castlevania: Aria of Sorrow
2003	Castlevania: Lament of Innocence
2004
2005	Castlevania: Dawn of Sorrow
2005	Castlevania: Curse of Darkness
2006	Castlevania: Portrait of Ruin
2007	Castlevania: The Dracula X Chronicles
2008	Castlevania: Order of Ecclesia
2009	Castlevania: The Adventure ReBirth
2010	Castlevania: Lords of Shadow
2011–2012
2013	Castlevania: Lords of Shadow – Mirror of Fate
2014	Castlevania: Lords of Shadow 2
2015–2023
2024	Haunted Castle Revisited
2025
2026	Castlevania: Belmont's Curse

Most Castlevania titles have been released in Japan, North America, Europe and Australia on various video game consoles, personal computers (PC) and mobile phones, with additional remakes and re-releases.

The first console title, Castlevania, was released on the Famicom Disk System in 1986 and in North America in 1987 on the Nintendo Entertainment System (NES). A 2D sidescrolling action game where the player progresses through six stages, many principal features of the Castlevania series originated with it. It has been ported to many platforms, such as the NES Classic Edition. Also released in 1986 was Vampire Killer for the MSX home computer, which played significantly differently from the original Castlevania, where players had to search for the exit before they could proceed to the next stage. Following that year, in 1987, Castlevania II: Simon's Quest further departed from the standard platforming genre of the first Castlevania for a game more similar to the nonlinear gameplay of Metroid, with several role-playing elements such as a world map which the player is free to explore and revisit.

Haunted Castle (1988), the first arcade title, returned to the linear platforming gameplay of the original. This continued with the first handheld Game Boy entry, Castlevania: The Adventure and the NES sequel, Castlevania III: Dracula's Curse, both released in 1989. Dracula's Curse added features to the original gameplay, including alternate stages and multiple playable characters. The Adventure saw a Game Boy sequel, Castlevania II: Belmont's Revenge, in 1992 and a remake, Castlevania: The Adventure ReBirth, developed by M2 for the WiiWare service in 2009.

The first 16-bit home console game, Super Castlevania IV, was released for the Super Nintendo Entertainment System (SNES) in 1991. A Castlevania title for the X68000 home computer was released in Japan in 1993 and would not be available in English until Castlevania Chronicles (2001) for the PlayStation. During the same year, Castlevania: Rondo of Blood was released for the PC Engine and was not localized in English until it was included with Castlevania: The Dracula X Chronicles (2007) for the PlayStation Portable. The first Castlevania produced for a CD-ROM, Rondo of Blood features Red Book audio and fully voiced dialogue. The game's content would be reused in Castlevania: Dracula X, a game for the SNES in 1995. Castlevania: Bloodlines (1994) was the first Castlevania entry produced for a Sega console, the Genesis. It would not be re-released until 2019 as part of the Castlevania Anniversary Collection.

In 1997, Castlevania: Symphony of the Night and Castlevania Legends were released for the PlayStation and Game Boy, respectively. Symphony of the Night introduced a major change to the gameplay, incorporating role-playing elements and a nonlinear map that the player could freely explore, which was previously seen in Simon's Quest and Nintendo's Metroid series. Elements of Symphony of the Night would influence the gameplay of future titles, beginning with the Game Boy Advance entries Circle of the Moon, Harmony of Dissonance, and Aria of Sorrow, which were released from 2001 to 2003. Aria of Sorrow received a 2005 sequel, Dawn of Sorrow for the Nintendo DS, which was followed by Portrait of Ruin (2006) and Order of Ecclesia (2008).

Under the development of Konami's Kobe branch, the first game in the series to employ 3D graphics was Castlevania for Nintendo 64 in 1999, and it received an expansion called Castlevania: Legacy of Darkness later that year. In 2003, the next 3D Castlevania title, Lament of Innocence debuted for the PlayStation 2 with combat-oriented hack and slash gameplay that drew comparisons to Devil May Cry and retroactively, God of War. It was followed two years later by Castlevania: Curse of Darkness.

A reboot of the franchise launched with Castlevania: Lords of Shadow in 2010, a multi-platform 3D action title developed by MercurySteam and co-produced by Hideo Kojima. It was followed by two sequels, Lords of Shadow – Mirror of Fate for Nintendo 3DS in 2013, and Lords of Shadow 2 in 2014. At the time, Lords of Shadow 2 was the last mainline game in the franchise before Konami shifted focus to mobile games and gambling in the 2010s.

Rumors began circulating in 2021 that, following internal restructuring at Konami to refocus on PC and console games, a "reimagining" of the series was in development. In 2024, a remake of Haunted Castle was included in the compilation Castlevania Dominus Collection. Titled Haunted Castle Revisited, it was developed by M2, who previously worked on The Adventure ReBirth. A new game called Castlevania: Belmont's Curse, developed by Evil Empire and Motion Twin, was released on October 15, 2026.

=== Spin-offs ===
Castlevania has spawned numerous spin-offs, the first being the 1990 platformer, Kid Dracula for the Famicom, a parody which stars the eponymous character. It was released for the first time in English for the Castlevania Anniversary Collection (2019). The game received a sequel for the Game Boy, also titled Kid Dracula.

Castlevania's first fighting game, Castlevania Judgment debuted for the Wii in 2008 and was developed by Eighting. Castlevania: Harmony of Despair, released in 2010, was an online, multiplayer title in which players could play as past Castlevania characters and explore stages.

Various titles have also been developed exclusively for the mobile phone market. Castlevania: Order of Shadows by Konami Mobile was made available in 2007. Castlevania: Grimoire of Souls was released on Android and iOS as a soft-launch on September 18, 2019, with a full release for iOS through Apple Arcade on September 17, 2021.

Arcade and slot machines based on the series have been produced. Castlevania: The Arcade (2009), a light gun shooter utilizing an LED remote, has been released in Japan and Europe. The Japanese-exclusive Pachislot Akumajō Dracula series is a line of pachislot titles released between 2009 and 2017. The first three are based on the video game Dracula's Curse, while a fourth game based on the Lords of Shadow reboot, Pachislot Akumajō Dracula: Lords of Shadow, was made available in 2017.

Castlevania characters and elements have crossed over in other Konami titles such as the Konami Wai Wai World series, Contra: Hard Corps, and Super Bomberman R,. They have also appeared in third party releases such as Super Smash Bros. Ultimate, Dead Cells, Dead by Daylight, and Vampire Survivors.

== Common elements ==
=== Gameplay ===
Gameplay of Castlevania on the NES. The player-character Simon Belmont attacks an enemy with the whip, which can be increased in length by collecting upgrades.

Castlevania, released for the NES in 1986, is a platform game in which the player takes the role of the character Simon Belmont, navigating through six levels of Dracula's castle. Each level is divided into six blocks of three stages each. He can navigate the castle's terrain by jumping across platforms and walking up staircases, enabling him to progress to new stages. Simon has a health meter, which decreases upon contact with enemies or hazards. Loss of all health, falling off-screen, or running out of time results in losing a life, with the game ending when all lives are depleted, though players can continue from the last checkpoint. Collecting points throughout the levels can increase the player's score and earn them additional lives. Each level culminates in a boss battle against one of Dracula's monsters, each with their own life meter that needs to be depleted using Simon's attacks. Simon wields the Vampire Killer whip, which can be improved by collecting upgrades hidden in candles. These upgrades extend the whip's length and power, allowing Simon to attack enemies from a greater distance with increased damage. Alongside the whip, Simon can use secondary weapons like throwing knives, holy water, and the boomerang-like cross, which consume hearts collected throughout the levels.

Screenshot of Castlevania: Portrait of Ruin, which features Metroidvania gameplay. In the top screen is the map, which records the player's progress as they explore the castle.

While Castlevania's gameplay set the standard for most titles, Castlevania II: Simon's Quest in 1987 briefly introduced role-playing elements, a departure from the strict platforming format of its predecessor. Unlike the linear progression of the first game, Simon's Quest allows players to explore a freely accessible world map, revisit areas, and engage with a dynamic environment that includes day and night cycles affecting enemy strength and the availability of non-playable characters. Players can interact with villagers who provide hints and visit merchants to buy items using hearts collected from defeated enemies. This installment also introduces experience points where Simon can increase his level and health capacity by gathering hearts. 1997's Castlevania: Symphony of the Night significantly expanded upon the gameplay introduced in Simon's Quest, setting a new formula for the series and influencing subsequent Metroidvania titles. Symphony of the Night also features non-linear exploration, requiring players to gather specific items and abilities to access different areas of Dracula's castle. This installment expanded the role-playing elements by including a more complex attribute and leveling system where the protagonist, Alucard, increases his in-game statistics by gaining experience points from defeated enemies. Alucard's ability to transform into a bat, wolf, or mist also allows him to explore previously inaccessible areas, and he can also use a wider range of equipment.

The first 3D installment in the franchise, Castlevania (1999) on the Nintendo 64 adopted gameplay elements distinctly different from its 2D predecessors. Unlike earlier titles, this version implemented a basic targeting and lock-on system for combat for the two playable characters, Reinhardt and Carrie. The new environment itself played a crucial role in the gameplay, with challenges based on precision in jumping across 3D platforms and navigating through hazardous areas, some of which included rotating and crumbling platforms. Castlevania for the Nintendo 64 also incorporated elements of survival horror, such as a sequence where the player must run from a pursuing enemy in a hedge maze. Unlike the earlier 3D installment which involved navigating through various levels with a degree of platforming challenge, 2003's Lament of Innocence focused on a central hub system. This hub allowed access to five main areas from the start, with progress tied to defeating bosses to unlock the final area. The combat system also allows the player to execute a series of fluid and dynamic combos using the primary weapon, the Whip of Alchemy. This system enables players to chain attacks into continuous strikes, enhancing combat engagement and effectiveness against enemies. The 2010 reboot, Lords of Shadow introduced a more diverse range of up to forty unlockable combos with the game's whip, the Combat Cross, integrating both direct and area attacks. Additionally, it functions as a tool for exploration, aiding in scaling walls, rappelling, and swinging across gaps, which deepens the platforming elements central to the franchise. Moreover, Lords of Shadow features massive boss battles against titans, where players must use the Combat Cross to navigate and disable them.

=== Plot and setting ===
The Castlevania franchise heavily references the horror films produced by Universal Pictures and Hammer Film Productions. Creator of the series, Hitoshi Akamatsu, wanted players to feel like they were in a classic horror film. Zombies, werewolves, Frankenstein's monster, and Count Dracula make recurring appearances. Alucard, introduced in Castlevania III: Dracula's Curse, is a reference to the character of the same name from the 1943 film, Son of Dracula. The games include folklore and mythological monsters such as Medusa, as well as direct references to literary horror. Castlevania: Bloodlines explicitly incorporates the events of Bram Stoker's Dracula into the series, and the recurring character Carmilla is based on the 1872 novel Carmilla by Joseph Sheridan Le Fanu.

Castlevania mainly takes place in the castle of Count Dracula, who resurrects every hundred years to take over the world. With the exception of some games, the players assume the role of the Belmonts, a clan of vampire hunters who have defeated Dracula for centuries with the Vampire Killer. The Vampire Killer is a legendary whip that is passed down to their successors and can only be used by them. In Castlevania: Bloodlines, the whip has been inherited by John Morris, the son of Quincey Morris, who is a distant descendant of the Belmonts. Other recurring characters throughout the series include the dhampir Alucard, who sides with Trevor Belmont against his father Dracula in Dracula's Curse. Trevor is joined by Sypha Belnades, a vampire hunter who fights using magic and marries Trevor by the end of the game. Descendants of the Belnades clan, such as Carrie Fernandez and Yoko Belnades, would make appearances as playable characters in later titles.

Castlevania: Lords of Shadow is a reboot of the franchise, with its first game set in Southern Europe during the Middle Ages. The main character, Gabriel Belmont, is a member of the Brotherhood of Light, an elite group of holy knights who defend people from supernatural creatures. With a retractable chain whip called the Combat Cross, Gabriel fights a malevolent force known as the Lords of Shadow in order to obtain the God Mask, which he believes can bring back his deceased wife. In Castlevania: Lords of Shadow – Mirror of Fate, Gabriel stars as Dracula, the main antagonist of Simon and Trevor Belmont. The sequel, Castlevania: Lords of Shadow 2 is set during modern times, where Dracula is looking for a way to put an end to his immortality.

In 2002, the games Legends, Circle of the Moon, Castlevania (1999), and Legacy of Darkness were retconned from the official chronology by Koji Igarashi, a move which had been met with some criticism by fans. Igarashi noted that Legends conflicted with the plotline of the series, and that the reason for Circle of the Moon's removal was not due to his non-involvement with the game, but instead the intention of the game's development team for Circle of the Moon to be a stand-alone title. The American 20th Anniversary Pre-order Bundle for Portrait of Ruin in 2006 featured a poster with a timeline that re-included the games other than Legends. In 2007, Konami still excluded them from the canon on the official Japanese website. Igarashi has said that he considered the titles a "subseries".

== Development ==
Being aware of the horror movies from long ago (long before the slasher flicks), I wanted the players to feel like they were in a classic horror movie.

— Hitoshi Akamatsu, 1993

Castlevania was directed and programmed by Hitoshi Akamatsu for the Family Computer Disk System in 1986. The game's staff roll features names taken from horror film icons, with Akamatsu being credited as "Trans Fishers", a reference to film director Terence Fisher. This is possibly because Konami did not allow the use of real names at the time in order to prevent other companies from hiring people who worked for them. An admirer of cinema, Akamatsu approached projects with a "film director's eye", and said the visuals and music for Castlevania were "made by people who consciously wanted to do something cinematic." The protagonist Simon Belmont uses a whip because Akamatsu liked the mechanics of a weapon able to repel enemies, and also because Akamatsu was a fan of Raiders of the Lost Ark. After the success of Castlevania, it was released in cartridge format for the Nintendo Entertainment System (NES) as one of its first major platform games. The international title Castlevania was the result of Konami of America senior vice president Emil Heidkamp's discomfort with Akumajō Dracula, which he believed translated as "Dracula Satanic Castle". Because of Nintendo of America's censorship policies at the time, most instances of blood, nudity and religious imagery were removed or edited in early Castlevania games.

Akamatsu directed Castlevania II: Simon's Quest in 1987, which adopted gameplay similar to Nintendo's Metroid. When asked if Metroid had any inspiration, Akamatsu instead cited Maze of Galious, another Konami title which featured exploration and puzzle solving. His last game in the series, Castlevania III: Dracula's Curse (1989), returned to the standard platforming genre of Castlevania. Since Konami's Teenage Mutant Ninja Turtles games sold many copies, their development was prioritized above other titles, leading the developers for Dracula's Curse to make a game that would outdo them. Simon's Quest and Dracula's Curse were not a commercial success, and Akamatsu was demoted to working in one of Konami's game centers before he chose to resign.

In 1993, three Castlevania games were in parallel development, which included Akumajō Dracula, Rondo of Blood, and Bloodlines. Directed and produced by Toru Hagihara, Rondo of Blood was the first installment made for a CD-ROM and the first to be fully voiced. Hagihara would go on to direct a sequel, Symphony of the Night (1997) for the PlayStation, with Koji Igarashi joining him as the assistant director and story writer. Joining the staff was artist Ayami Kojima, who was hired to introduce a new look for Castlevania. She would be the character designer for several future Castlevania titles. Igarashi said it began development as "something of a side story series". From the outset, the game was supposed to take the franchise in a new direction. The gameplay took a departure from the original platforming entries, instead adopting nonlinear exploration and role-playing game elements, which were last seen in Simon's Quest. The critical reaction to Simon's Quest and its gameplay allowed them to pitch Symphony of the Night to Konami. Igarashi was eventually asked to finish the game as the assistant director after Hagihara was promoted to head of the division. On release, Symphony of the Night was well-received and became a sleeper hit, but its commercial performance was mediocre, particularly in the United States where it was meagerly publicized.

Artwork of characters from Castlevania: Grimoire of Souls (2019) by Ayami Kojima. Kojima was hired in 1997 to introduce a new art style to the series and has since contributed to several of its titles.

The first Castlevania game to feature 3D computer graphics began development in 1997 on the Nintendo 64 by Konami Computer Entertainment Kobe (KCEK) as Dracula 3D. Like most of its predecessors, it was an action-adventure and platforming game. It was eventually released as Castlevania in 1999 and received an expanded version titled Castlevania: Legacy of Darkness during the same year. KCEK's last Castlevania game was the acclaimed Circle of the Moon, released as a launch title for the Game Boy Advance in 2001. Circle of the Moon was the first entry to feature Metroidvania gameplay since Symphony of the Night. Igarashi, who was not involved with the game, was critical of Circle of the Moon. In 2002, he retconned Castlevania Legends (1997) and the games developed by KCEK from the series' chronology due to story conflicts, which was met with some resistance from fans. After KCEK was dissolved during 2002, the Game Boy Advance received a second installment, Castlevania: Harmony of Dissonance, now produced by Igarashi and developed by Konami Computer Entertainment Tokyo (KCET). Starting with Harmony of Dissonance, the Japanese games adopted Castlevania as the title for a brief period. According to Igarashi, the developers did this since Count Dracula is not always the main antagonist. This continued with Castlevania: Lament of Innocence (2003), a 3D title developed as a new starting point for the series. Konami eventually returned to the title Akumajō Dracula with the Japanese release of 2005's Castlevania: Dawn of Sorrow for the Nintendo DS. Dawn of Sorrow and Portrait of Ruin (2006) introduced a new art style in hopes of broadening the player demographic and preventing younger Nintendo DS owners from being put off by Ayami Kojima's art. This discontinued with Castlevania: Order of Ecclesia in 2008.

Due to concern over the poor sales of the recent Castlevania games, a number of prototypes in development competed to become the next Castlevania installment, which included a game by Igarashi announced at Tokyo Game Show 2008 and Castlevania: Lords of Shadow by Spanish studio MercurySteam. Konami told MercurySteam the game would be an original intellectual property (IP) when it was first greenlit as a Castlevania title. Konami eventually asked them to cease work on Lords of Shadow while it was still in its early stages, until producer David Cox showed the Japanese senior management the game and was offered help by video game designer Hideo Kojima. According to Igarashi, development on his project had not been going smoothly, and Konami had canceled it and chose Lords of Shadow as the pitch for the next Castlevania entry. Produced by Dave Cox and Hideo Kojima, Lords of Shadow was a multi-platform 3D action-adventure reboot of the series. Kojima offered his input on the project and also oversaw the game's localization in Japan. It was the first Castlevania to feature celebrity voice talent, starring Robert Carlyle in the lead role and Patrick Stewart. The art style departed from the previous games in favor of one inspired by Guillermo del Toro's work. Lords of Shadow was met with positive reception in 2010 and a commercial success, becoming the best selling Castlevania game to date. It was followed by two sequels, Mirror of Fate (2013) and Castlevania: Lords of Shadow 2 (2014). Lords of Shadow 2 was not as well received as its predecessor. Following its release, an anonymous source claiming to be employees from MercurySteam alleged that development on the game had been troubled.

After having been moved to Konami's social division in 2011, Igarashi felt he was unable to release any new games when Konami shifted its focus towards mobile game development. He left in March 2014 to independently create Bloodstained: Ritual of the Night, a spiritual successor to Castlevania. Dave Cox followed Igarashi's resignation a few months later. Castlevania titles released under Konami's new business model included mobile games, as well as pachinko and slot machines based on the IP. This continued until 2021 when rumors circulated that internal restructuring at Konami would refocus on PC and console games, with a "reimagining" of the series being developed. A remake of Haunted Castle was included in the 2024 compilation Castlevania Dominus Collection, titled Haunted Castle Revisited. Haunted Castle Revisited was developed by M2, who previously worked on The Adventure ReBirth. For the series' 40th anniversary, Evil Empire in development with Motion Twin released Castlevania: Belmont's Curse, the first brand new game since 2014.

=== Audio ===
Castlevania's music features a wide range of compositions, with themes reused throughout the series. It has been critically acclaimed and released on many albums, initially under the King Records label. In addition to original soundtracks, it has also inspired remix albums, which include orchestra, rap and heavy metal arrangements. In 2010, Castlevania – The Concert was performed in Stockholm, Sweden by longtime Castlevania composer, Michiru Yamane, and the Stockholm Youth Symphonic Orchestra.

The music for the first installment, Castlevania, was composed by Kinuyo Yamashita and Satoe Terashima. The game's staff roll featured pseudonyms, with Yamashita credited as James Banana. Yamashita said she did not know anything about video games at the time and composed for Castlevania shortly after graduating from college. Under strict hardware constraints, she would first write the scores before entering it as data into a computer. The hardware for the first 16-bit title, Super Castlevania IV, allowed for a more atmospheric environment in the game, and was composed by Masanori Adachi and Taro Kudo.

Known primarily for her work on the Castlevania series, Michiru Yamane first composed music for the Sega Genesis game, Castlevania: Bloodlines. Yamane was under pressure at the time because the series was already popular and known for its music. She felt there was a link with the game's vampiric themes and the classical music she had grown up with, having studied Johann Sebastian Bach in university, and worked to integrate her style with the rock themes of the previous games. Since Castlevania: Symphony of the Night, Yamane became involved with the development of the series with its former producer, Koji Igarashi. Symphony of the Night's art director, Osamu Kasai, requested Yamane to join the team, and she would draw inspiration from Ayami Kojima's concept artwork. Unlike the FM synthesis that Bloodlines used, Yamane felt she had more freedom with Symphony of the Night as it was produced for a CD-ROM, which made it capable of much higher quality music and sound. She continued to compose for the series, including the Game Boy Advance and Nintendo DS games, which had note limitations like older home consoles, and also collaborated with other composers such as Yuzo Koshiro. Before becoming a freelance composer, the last Castlevania game she scored was Castlevania: Order of Ecclesia in 2008, which she worked on with Yasuhiro Ichihashi.

For the 2010 reboot, Castlevania: Lords of Shadow, the game was scored by Óscar Araujo using a 120-piece orchestra. His work on Lords of Shadow earned him a nomination for breakout composer of the year by the International Film Music Critics Association, and he won "Best Original Score for a Video Game or Interactive Media." Araujo went on to compose the sequels, Mirror of Fate and Lords of Shadow 2.

== Reception ==
Aggregate review scores
Game	GameRankings	Metacritic
Castlevania	70.92% (GBA)	—
The Adventure	55.07%	—
Belmont's Revenge	83.50%	—
Super Castlevania IV	82.06%	—
Bloodlines	83.50%	—
Dracula X	71%	—
Symphony of the Night	93.03%	93
Legends	52.88%	—
Castlevania (1999)	72.71%	78
Legacy of Darkness	63.80%	—
Circle of the Moon	88.32%	91
Chronicles	73.53%	69
Harmony of Dissonance	85.12%	87
Aria of Sorrow	87.86%	91
Lament of Innocence	78.72%	79
Dawn of Sorrow	90.35%	89
Curse of Darkness	70.37% (PS2)	70 (PS2)
Portrait of Ruin	84.98%	85
Order of Ecclesia	85.67%	85
The Adventure ReBirth	81.10%	82
Lords of Shadow	82.70% (Xbox 360); 83.33% (PS3); 77.40% (PC)	85 (PS3); 83 (Xbox 360); 81 (PC)
Lords of Shadow – Mirror of Fate	71.81% (3DS); 74.00% (Xbox 360); 63.75% (PS3)	72 (3DS); 73 (Xbox 360); 70 (PS3)
Lords of Shadow 2	71.00% (Xbox 360); 63.12% (PS3); 58.10% (PC)	70 (Xbox 360); 63 (PS3); 60 (PC)
Belmont's Curse	—N/a	83 (PS5); 82 (PC); 80 (Switch); 87 (XSX/S)

The Castlevania franchise had sold over 20 million copies worldwide as of 2006; it had previously sold over 3.7 million units by 1993. The franchise has received mostly positive reviews, with the most acclaimed game being Symphony of the Night for the PlayStation and the most panned being Judgment, with aggregate scores of 93 and 49, respectively, on Metacritic and 93.38% and 52.71%, respectively, on GameRankings.

Many of the games have appeared on lists of video games considered to be the best. Symphony of the Night appeared at #16 on IGN "Top 100 games" and was one of the first to be introduced on the GameSpot "The Greatest Games of All Time". Both acclaimed the game to successfully making a game in 2D while the industry was moving to 3D. Castlevania III: Dracula's Curse was named the 9th best 8-bit game by GameTrailers. Super Castlevania IV was named the 11th best game of the SNES by ScrewAttack on their "Top 20 SNES Games". The series as a whole was named the 4th best franchise in games ever by IGN, behind only Final Fantasy, The Legend of Zelda and Mario, and citing Super Castlevania IV and Symphony of the Night as highlights. Aria of Sorrow was named the 2nd best game on the Game Boy Advance and one of the must buys for the system, according to the same website. Castlevania, Super Castlevania IV, and Aria of Sorrow appeared on Nintendo Power's "Top 200 Games" list. Trivia about the series has been mentioned in the Guinness World Records: Gamer's Edition 2008.

== In other media ==
Simon Belmont was one of the stars in the animated series Captain N: The Game Master. Simon is portrayed as egotistical on the show and his physical appearance differs from his design in the video game series. He was a member of the N-Team, a group of mostly video game characters who defended Videoland against the antagonist Mother Brain from Metroid. Dracula, referred to only as "the Count", appeared as a villain in Captain N. Alucard also appeared in one episode, though he was portrayed as a rebellious skateboarding teenager.

Several novels and comic book adaptations have been made. Worlds of Power, a 1990s series of books with stories based on Nintendo games, featured a novel about Simon's Quest written by Christopher Howell, and the series was produced by Seth Godin. It departs from the original plot and introduces characters not seen in the game, including junior high school student Timothy Bradley, a video gamer who crosses over into the world of Simon's Quest and assists Simon Belmont. In 2005, IDW Publishing released the graphic novel Castlevania: The Belmont Legacy, based on Castlevania: The Adventure, written by Marc Andreyko with art by E. J. Su. Illustrated by Kou Sasakura, a two-volume manga adaptation titled Castlevania: Curse of Darkness, based on the PlayStation 2 installment, was published in Japan from 2005 to 2006. It was released in English in 2008. 2003's Lament of Innocence was adapted into a cellphone comic book, released exclusively in Japan from 2007 to 2008 for 40 episodes.

The franchise has its own toy line manufactured by NECA which consists of six figures of Simon Belmont, Alucard, Dracula, Succubus and a Pixel Simon mini figure which was exclusively available as a promotional item at Comic-Con 2007.

=== TV series ===
The streaming service Netflix released an American animated series titled Castlevania as part of its original programming between 2017 and 2021, consisting of four seasons and 32 episodes. The first two seasons adapt elements from Castlevania III: Dracula's Curse and follow Trevor Belmont, Alucard and Sypha Belnades as they defend the nation of Wallachia from Dracula while later seasons include elements from other games such as Castlevania: Curse of Darkness and Castlevania: Symphony of the Night. The series was created by Warren Ellis; in developing the series, Ellis relied heavily on a script he had written for an animated Castlevania film from 2007 that never entered production. The art style of the series is influenced by anime and the artwork of Ayami Kojima, with animation provided by Frederator Studios and Powerhouse Animation Studios.

A sequel to the original show, Castlevania: Nocturne, was released on Netflix on September 28, 2023. It focuses on Richter Belmont, a descendent of Trevor Belmont and Sypha Belnades, and Maria Renard in France during the French Revolution, 300 years after the original series. The series adapts elements from Castlevania: Rondo of Blood. The second season premiered on January 16, 2025. Original series creator Warren Ellis was not involved in the new series after sexual misconduct allegations surfaced in 2020.

=== Cancelled projects ===
A Castlevania television series was considered in the late 1980s as part of the Super Mario Bros. Power Hour, a one-hour animation block of Nintendo-focused video game adaptations. Concept art was produced for the project by DIC Animation City. Only the Mario and The Legend of Zelda segments for the block were ultimately produced, airing in 1989 as part of The Super Mario Bros. Super Show!.

A Castlevania film was planned in the late 2000s. However, in December 2007, Rogue Pictures halted active development of Castlevania due to the writers' strike and, later, the sale of the studio to Relativity Media and possibility of a screen actors' guild strike. On May 27, 2009, the Castlevania film was reported as officially canceled.
