= Castlevania Legends =

1997 video game

- North American box art
- Developer: Konami Computer Entertainment Nagoya
- Publisher: Konami
- Director: Kouki Yamashita
- Producer: Hiroyuki Fukui
- Designer: Tsukasa Hiyoshi
- Programmer: Yoshiteru Yamaguchi
- Artist: Kazunobu Uchida
- Composers: Kaoru Okada; Youichi Iwata
- Series: Castlevania
- Platform: Game Boy
- Release: JP: November 27, 1997; NA: March 11, 1998; EU: 1998
- Genres: Action, platform
- Mode: Single-player

Castlevania Legends (Note: Known in Japan as Akumajō Dracula: Dark Night Prelude (悪魔城ドラキュラ 漆黒たる前奏曲(ダークナイト プレリュード), Akumajō Dorakyura Dāku Naito Pureryūdo; Demon Castle Dracula: Dark Night Prelude)) is a 1997 action-platform game developed and released by Konami for the Game Boy. The third Castlevania game released for the system, the story follows Sonia Belmont, a vampire hunter battling the first incarnation of Count Dracula. The game was conceived as a prequel to all other games in the Castlevania series; however, it was later retconned.

Castlevania Legends was released in Japan on November 27, 1997 and in Europe and North America on March 11, 1998. The game received mixed to negative reviews, with criticism directed towards its lack of difficulty, short length, technical issues, and unoriginality. The game received its first official re-release on the Nintendo Classics service on October 31, 2023.

== Gameplay ==
Gameplay

Castlevania Legends is a side-scrolling platformer where the protagonist, Sonia Belmont, armed with a whip, charges through five stages of Count Dracula's castle, filled with various enemies and candles containing items. Each stage ends in a mini-boss fight which rewards a "Soul Weapon", which Sonia can cast, consuming varying amounts of hearts.

The game implements two difficulty levels and password based save states. Should the timer run out, Sonia fall off the screen, or either her life bar or time counter fall to zero, she will lose all of her hearts and one life, and will restart at the last checkpoint with the basic whip. If she loses all of her lives, the player is presented with the game over screen, where they may exit or choose to continue from the last checkpoint of the current stage. Once per stage, Sonia can activate her inborn ability to enter "Burning Mode", where she becomes invincible, moves faster, and has more powerful attacks for ten seconds.

== Plot ==
The story begins in the year 1450 in Transylvania, during the incarnation of the original Count Dracula. Sonia Belmont, the first vampire hunter of her clan, develops mystical powers in her 17th year, and ventures out to challenge Dracula, meeting Alucard who seeks revenge against his father. After Dracula's defeat, he swears to Sonia that as long as there is evil in the world, he will be resurrected, and in response she swears her family will always defeat him. Later, Sonia gives birth to a child, implied to have been fathered by Alucard. The game was designed as the first game in the series timeline, but later declared non-canon.

== Reception ==
Reception

Review scores
| Publication | Score |
|---|---|
| Computer and Video Games | 2/5 |
| Electronic Gaming Monthly | 5/10, 5/10, 4.5/10, 4.5/10 |
| Nintendo Life | 4/10 |
| Nintendo Power | 6.4/10 |
| TV Gamer | 7/10, 4/10, 6/10 |

Castlevania Legends was met with negative reception by critics upon release. Electronic Gaming Monthly's four reviewers found the game overly short and boringly easy, as well as complaining of ropy collision detection and cheap deaths resulting from what should be simple jumps. However, their biggest criticism was that there was no real advancement from the previous Castlevania Game Boy installment, Castlevania II: Belmont's Revenge, since other Game Boy releases had made major advances in both gameplay and graphics in the seven years that had passed since Belmont's Revenge. Nintendo Power said the game recreates the Castlevania look and feel and praised the addition of Light Mode, but echoed Electronic Gaming Monthly's criticisms that the game is much too easy and that even a slight miscalculation in a jump results in the player character's death. Computer and Video Games found the game overly simplistic even by Game Boy standards, and commented that "Some of the first GB titles were better than this in terms of graphics and collision detection."

In a 2007 Castlevania series retrospective, IGN called the game one of the series's cult classics, but said it suffers from the Game Boy's technical limitations and is overly different from other games in the series. GameSpy called the music "disappointing", as the previous two Game Boy Castlevania games were highly praised for their music. Game Informer's Tim Turi felt that the game was lacking especially compared to Castlevania: Symphony of the Night.

Longtime Castlevania producer Koji Igarashi removed the game from the series timeline, claiming that in his opinion it conflicted with the plotline of the main games.

Time Extension placed Legends fifth last on its list of ranked Castlevania games: "Following the amazing Belmont's Revenge was no easy task, and in all fairness, Legends is an inferior outing in almost every regard, bar the fact that it came with battery back-up so you could save your progress. The visuals, controls and music are all worse than they are in Belmont's Revenge, but that hasn't stopped Legends from becoming one of the most desirable and expensive Game Boy games. It's worth a look, but only via emulation."

== In other media ==
Sonia was one of the confirmed leads in the Dreamcast game Castlevania: Resurrection, up until that game's cancellation.

Sonia appears as a playable character for the Ode to Castlevania DLC in Vampire Survivors.
