= Castlevania: The Adventure =

1989 video game

- North American box art
- Developer: Konami
- Publisher: Konami
- Programmers: Y. Yamada; Masato Maegawa
- Artists: N. Nakazato; K. Kimura
- Series: Castlevania
- Platform: Game Boy
- Release: JP: October 27, 1989; NA: December 1989; PAL: August 8, 1991
- Genre: Platform
- Mode: Single-player

Castlevania: The Adventure (Note: Known in Japan as Dracula Densetsu (ドラキュラ伝説, Dorakyura Densetsu; The Legend of Dracula). Trademark of the game is Castlevania – The Adventure) is a 1989 platform game developed and published by Konami for the Game Boy. The game is the first in the Castlevania series to be released on a handheld game console.

The game was re-released as part of the Konami GB Collection Vol.1 compilation in Japan and Europe, the latter version of which added color support. A remake titled Castlevania: The Adventure ReBirth was released as a WiiWare game for the Wii. The original game is included in the Castlevania Anniversary Collection, which was released in 2019.

== Gameplay ==
The top of the screen display's the time remaining in the stage, while the bottom of the screen show's the player's current health and score. At the center of the screen, Christopher, the player character, is whipping an enemy.

The player controls Christopher Belmont, the ancestor of Simon Belmont, who goes on a quest to defeat Dracula.

The game consists of four stages, and unlike other Castlevania games, there are no sub-weapons, but hearts are used to restore health. The player has three lives, after losing them the player must restart the level. Weapons can be upgraded, such as the whip into the chain whip and flame whip, but any enemy damage will downgrade an upgraded weapon. At the end of each level, there is a "primary evil" (boss) to confront. Players can utilize crystals, hearts, and crosses of gold. There is a point counter, and at 10,000 points, a player receives an extra life, and receives one for every 20,000 points after that. Each stage has a time limit in which to complete the level.

== Development ==
Programmer Masato Maegawa joined Konami after graduating university and worked on Castlevania: The Adventure. He later left Konami, stating that at Konami you had to make sequels to big titles like the Teenage Mutant Ninja Turtles or Castlevania games. Without the freedom to develop games like Gunstar Heroes, Maegawa left Konami to form Treasure. In a 1997 interview, Maegawa said that Castlevania: The Adventure was not good.

== Release and reception ==
Castlevania: The Adventure was released in Japan on October 27, 1989, for the Game Boy. It was released in North America in December 1989. Konami stated that the game had grossed nearly $9 million in retail sales revenue by 1991.

=== Contemporary reception ===
Reception

Review scores
Publication	Score
Electronic Gaming Monthly	8/10, 8/10, 8/10, 7/10
Famicom Hisshoubon	2/5
Famitsu	7/10, 6/10, 7/10, 5/10
Power Play	83%
Total!	89%
Video Games	81%
Zero	90/100

On the games initial release reviews in Electronic Gaming Monthly (EGM), Aktueller Software Markt and the Pennywhistle Press praised the graphics noting crisp details, fine graphics, and that they were surprisingly well done for the small Game Boy screen respectively. An EGM said it was one of the few Game Boy titles they had reviewed that had overcome the Game Boy's lack of color. Two reviewers in Famitsu found that the traditionally beautiful graphics were not achieved in the Game Boy Version and that the screen was a bit too hard to see when in motion.

Reviewers commented on the speed of the character in the game, with a reviewer in EGM and Total! saying it did not distract from the fun of the game. Two reviewers in Famitsu find the game too frustratingly slow-paced, with one saying it made the level seem even longer due to it. A review from Famicom Hisshoubon also found the movement too sluggish. One reviewer in Famitsu suggested that the game was made at a slower pace to have less afterimages on a Game Boy's screen. Review in Zero found the controls responsive and smooth while a review Video Games said they felt sluggish at first, but the game fully blossomed over time, especially by the third level. Both the reviews in Zero and Total! found that having continues enhanced the game, while the latter magazine said the it often restarted the player at problematic points in a level.

Summarizing their reviews, Zero and two reviewers in EGM said it was the best Game Boy they had reviewed, with one EGM reviewer saying it was "the best thing to appear on the Game Boy since Super Mario Land." How to Win at Game Boy Games gave Castlevania: The Adventure an A and wrote, "This is one of the earliest Game Boy games and still one of the best. A marvelous adaptation of the NES game with an endless variety of challenges and impressive music and sound effects." Power Play said it was the best of the Castlevania games while the Aktueller Software Markt reviewer said it was not as strong as the NES titles.

=== Retrospective reviews and re-releases ===
Reception

Review scores
Publication	Score
Nintendo Life	3/10
Retro Gamer	40%

From later 20th century reviews, an anonymous reviewer in Nintendo Power discussed the games re-release in 1997, opining that it was "as good as anything that has appeared [on the Game Boy] in the ensuing years" noting excellent graphics and play control. GamePro said that along with Castlevania II: Belmont's Revenge (1991), they were both "excellent additions to the Castlevania series."

The game was re-released for the Nintendo 3DS Virtual Console on October 25, 2012.

In retrospective reviews of the series, Damien McFerran of Retro Gamer dismissed the game saying it was basic in its graphics and had slow and plodding gameplay. In the American magazine Play, it was called "notably slower" and lacking sub-weapons. Mark Bozon of IGN stated that it lacked "true inspiration" and was "pretty basic in its overall game design." Game Informer's Tim Turi felt that it was held back by its technical limitations but praised its sound quality. Time Extension placed The Adventure second last on its list of ranked Castlevania games. It was described that "The gameplay is sluggish, the level design uninspired and the controls painful. Only a decent soundtrack saves this one from the scrapheap."

Re-reviewing the game for the 3DS virtual console, Retro Gamer said the games biggest sticking points were poor visuals, stiff controls and "some frustratingly precise jumps later on". They concluded that the slow pace, lack of sub-weapons and question hit detection only added to the disappointment. Damien McFerran of Nintendo Life reviewed the release for its 3DS eShop re-release. He described it as an "aching disappointment" noting the sluggish pacing, poor level design, and lacking elements familiar to the series such as stairways, missing weapons. McFerran complimented the games score while concluding it was "one of the better-looking Game Boy launch titles, but that's not saying much."

== In other media ==
A series of comic books were released in 2005 by IDW Publishing called Castlevania: The Belmont Legacy, which are based on the game.
