= Castlevania: Dracula X =

1995 video game

- North American box art
- Developer: Konami
- Publisher: Konami
- Director: Kouki Yamashita
- Producer: Kuniaki Kinoshita
- Artist: Akihiro Yamada
- Composers: Tomoya Tomita; Masanari Iwata; Harumi Ueko; Masahiko Kimura
- Series: Castlevania
- Platform: Super NES
- Release: JP: July 21, 1995; NA: September 1995; EU: February 22, 1996; AU: June 22, 1996
- Genre: Platform
- Mode: Single-player

Castlevania: Dracula X, titled Castlevania: Vampire's Kiss in Europe and Akumajou Dracula XX (Note: 悪魔城ドラキュラＸＸ (Akumajō Dorakyura Daburu Ekkusu; lit. Devil's Castle Dracula Double X)) in Japan, is a 1995 platform game developed and published by Konami for the Super Nintendo Entertainment System. It is the second Castlevania installment to be released for the Super NES. It is a remake of Castlevania: Rondo of Blood, which was previously released in Japan on the PC Engine Super CD-ROM^{2} in 1993. While the plot is similar to Rondo of Blood and it uses many of that game's graphics, it features new levels and altered gameplay elements, rather than being a direct port because of the limits of the Super NES cartridge format and exclusivity agreements with PC Engine maker NEC. It was released on July 21, 1995 in Japan, in September 1995 in North America, February 22, 1996 in Europe, and on June 22, 1996, in Australia. The game received mixed reviews, with journalists considering it inferior to Rondo of Blood and criticizing its high difficulty.

The game was re-released as a Wii U Virtual Console download in Japan on April 23, 2014, in North America on October 2, 2014, and the PAL regions on November 13, 2014. It was released again for New Nintendo 3DS Virtual Console download in North America on December 29, 2016, and in Europe and Australia on January 26, 2017. The game was also re-released as a part of the Castlevania Advance Collection on September 23, 2021, for the Nintendo Switch, PlayStation 4, Windows, and Xbox One.

== Gameplay ==
Gameplay screenshot

The gameplay follows that of previous Castlevania games, and is near identical to that of Rondo of Blood. The Super NES release features branching paths through the levels, like the PC Engine game, but has fewer levels. Also, whereas Rondo of Blood has game saves and the ability to play as Maria Renard after she is rescued, Dracula X uses passwords and does not feature any additional playable characters. Unlike Rondo, however, Dracula X features three different endings, depending on whether the player rescues Richter's girlfriend Annet and her sister Maria, just Maria, or neither of the two, who have both been imprisoned in Dracula's castle.

== Plot ==
Set in medieval Transylvania, several hundred years have passed since legendary hero Simon Belmont defeated the evil Count Dracula and sealed him away for what was supposed to be eternity. (Note: As depicted in Castlevania (1986)) The people have long since forgotten about the horror of the undead, allowing a few depraved individuals to revive the Count; sleeping in his coffin by day and preying upon helpless victims by night.

Dracula plots revenge on Simon's bloodline by attempting to murder Richter Belmont, Simon's descendant. He does this by kidnapping Richter's girlfriend Annet, and Annet's little sister Maria, imprisoning them in his castle, and waiting for Richter to attempt a rescue.

Once Richter discovers Annet and Maria have been kidnapped, he takes his ancestor's sacred whip, passed down through generations, and sets out for Dracula's castle to rescue Annet and Maria, and to seal away the evil Count for good.

== Reception ==
Reception

Aggregate score
Aggregator	Score
GameRankings	73.75%

Review scores
Publication	Score
Electronic Gaming Monthly	7/10, 6.5/10, 6.5/10, 7/10
Famitsu	7/10, 6/10, 6/10, 5/10
Game Informer	7.75/10
Game Players	64%
GameFan	82/100, 84/100, 93/100
GamePro	2.5/5
GamesMaster	72%
Next Generation	1/5
Official Nintendo Magazine	73/100
Super Play	80%
Total!	(UK) 77/100, (DE) 2-
The Super Famicom	68/100
VideoGames	7/10

Castlevania: Dracula X received a 20.4/30 score in a readers' poll conducted by Super Famicom Magazine. The game received mixed reception from critics, holding a rating of 73.75% based on four reviews according to review aggregator GameRankings.

Most critics stating that Castlevania: Dracula X is an inferior conversion of the PC Engine game. Electronic Gaming Monthly said it is a good game in its own terms, but that it does not hold up to previous Castlevania games. GamePro's Mike Weigand criticized that the stage design fails to encourage re-exploring stages, the bosses are not challenging enough, and the graphics and gameplay are primitive: "no knockout Mode 7 stages, no rotating rooms (like in Castlevania IV). Your character is also very small. The play engine feels like it's right out of the 8-bit versions ..." A critic for Next Generation panned it, saying it retains the by-then outdated graphics and controls of the PC Engine game and would not appeal even to die-hard Castlevania fans. He summarized it as "eight levels of no-frills side-scrolling action ... without an original or interesting thought in its wolfsbane-stuffed head".

In contrast, IGN's retrospective on the series referred to it as "still one of the best traditional Castlevania games", and that it "holds its own" in terms of graphics, including a brighter color palette and Mode 7 graphics, but suffered from weak A.I. and bad level layout. It received a ranking of 73.75% from GameRankings, based on four reviews. In 2018, Complex rated the game 82nd on their "The Best Super Nintendo Games of All Time".
