= Super Castlevania IV =

1991 video game

- North American box art by Tom duBois
- Developer: Konami
- Publisher: Konami
- Director: Masahiro Ueno
- Producer: Kazumi Kitaue
- Designer: Kazumichi Ichihara
- Programmers: Masahiro Ueno; Mitsuru Yaida
- Artists: Kazumichi Ichihara; Satoshi Kushibuchi
- Composers: Masanori Adachi; Taro Kudo
- Series: Castlevania
- Platform: Super NES
- Release: JP: October 31, 1991; NA: December 1991; EU: November 23, 1992
- Genre: Platform
- Mode: Single-player

Super Castlevania IV (Note: Known in Japan as Akumajō Dracula (Japanese: 悪魔城(あくまじょう)ドラキュラ, Hepburn: Akumajō Dorakyura; Demon Castle Dracula)) is a 1991 platform game developed and published by Konami for the Super Nintendo Entertainment System. It has been re-released multiple times, including for the Super NES Classic Edition.

Super Castlevania IV features expanded play control, 16-bit graphics featuring Super NES's Mode 7, and a soundtrack featuring new pieces and arrangements based on previous Castlevania music. Following the same story as Castlevania on the NES, the game takes place in 1691 Transylvania, where the vampire hunter Simon Belmont must defeat the vampire Dracula. The game received critical acclaim, with praise for its gameplay, soundtrack, and visual style, and has since been considered one of the greatest video games ever made.

== Gameplay ==
The player-character Simon Belmont can use the whip to latch onto rings and swing over areas.

Super Castlevania IV is a platform game where the player takes control of Simon through eleven levels. Players begin the game with five lives, and it ends in a game over once they have lost them all. The player will lose a life if all of Simon's health gauge is depleted, fall into a hole or if they do not finish the level within the time limit. The health gauge can be restored through food items that can be dropped from candles and breakable blocks, or with the Magic Crystal, which is received after defeating the boss at the end of each level. A password can be entered to continue the game.

With Simon's whip, players can attack enemies in eight directions with the use of the control pad. By holding down the attack button, the whip will go limp and can be waved around with the control pad, which can be used to block projectiles and hit enemies (albeit for much less damage). The length and power of the whip can be increased up to two levels by collecting an item called the Morning Star. The whip is used for fighting and for latching onto rings to swing over areas that are too wide or dangerous for the player to jump across. In addition to jumping, the player can control Simon to move while crouching.

Like its predecessors, players can use secondary weapons that consume Simon's hearts, which are dropped from candles and enemies. The secondary weapons include an axe which can be thrown in an arc, a watch which stops all enemy motion and a dagger that can be thrown across the screen. Collecting the items known as the Double and Triple Shots allows the player to throw secondary weapons up to three times in a row.

== Development and release ==
Super Castlevania IV was directed by Masahiro Ueno (credited in the game as Jun Furano since Konami did not allow the use of real names at the time), who was also the main programmer. His first 16-bit game, Ueno's team possibly started development on it during 1989. Ueno liked the original Castlevania for the Nintendo Entertainment System the most and wanted to make a pure action game that was similar to it. Ueno only considers Super Castlevania IV a remake of the original Castlevania to some extent. Early design documents depict the player-character in modern attire, since the setting was not decided at the time. Many features in Super Castlevania IV were introduced to make it a less frustrating game for players, such as giving them more control over Simon when he walked up stairs.

Due to the team being small, everyone was involved with the design and some ideas came from the creative artists and others by the programmers' experiments. The team drew maps on paper and a lot was changed as the game was worked on. Branching stages, previously seen in Castlevania III: Dracula's Curse, were once considered but not included in Super Castlevania IV. Mitsuru Yaida (credited as Yaipon) programmed Simon and also implemented the game's whip system, which was to introduce some new gameplay that was not possible on the NES. This idea was once planned for the original Castlevania game. As the enemy and boss programmer, Ueno conceived some rough ideas and additional programmers would implement more detailed boss patterns. Earlier bosses were designed to be easier so that players could discover weak points and effective weapons without retrying. Ueno worked on both the Japanese and English versions of the game, with the latter featuring some instances of censorship. He was asked to alter the color palette in the English version in order to remove some depictions of blood in stage eight.

The packaging artwork for the North American version was created by Tom duBois, who designed the packaging for many other Konami titles outside Japan.

The game was released in Japan on October 31, 1991 for the Super Famicom. It was released in North America in late December 1991. Factor 5 created a short demo of the game running on the Mega Drive and presented it to Konami. Konami was impressed but ultimately chose to keep all Mega Drive development in-house, and did not pursue porting the game to the system.

The game has been re-released on several platforms over the years. It was re-released on the Virtual Console in 2006 for the Wii, in 2013 for the Wii U, and in 2016 for the New Nintendo 3DS. In September 2017, it was included on Nintendo's Super NES Classic Edition, a miniature replica of the Super NES featuring many built-in games. The game is included in Castlevania Anniversary Collection, a compilation of past Castlevania installments released on May 17, 2019 for Nintendo Switch, PlayStation 4, Windows, and Xbox One.

== Audio ==
The music for Super Castlevania IV was composed by Masanori Adachi and Taro Kudo (credited as Masanori Oodachi and Taro respectively). Ueno wanted to make the environment of Super Castlevania IV more interactive and was proud of how the game's sound effects and music contributed to the atmosphere. It was released on Akumajō Dracula Best 2 in a compilation with Castlevania: The Adventure and Castlevania II: Belmont's Revenge's music. On June 21, 2017, the game's music was released on vinyl by Mondo.

== Reception ==
Reception

Aggregate score
Aggregator	Score
GameRankings	82.06%

Review scores
Publication	Score
Dragon	3/5
Famitsu	7/10, 8/10, 8/10, 6/10
GameSpot	7.8/10
IGN	8/10
Mean Machines	93%
Nintendo Life	9/10
Super Play	91%
Entertainment Weekly	A+

The game sold 800,000 cartridges worldwide.

Upon Super Castlevania IV's release, the game was acclaimed by critics. Weekly Famicom Tsūshin generally complimented the game with three reviewers praising the graphics quality and three praising the control and gameplay, specifically the ability to use the whip in different angles. Nintendo Power gave the game four overall scores of 4.0, 4.0, 4.5 and 4.5 out of 5. Among several items, the magazine cited the game's graphics, music, and action sequences as positives. In 1994 the game was reviewed by Sandy Petersen in Dragon #209's "Eye of the Monitor" column. In 1992, Entertainment Weekly wrote, "Vampire noir: dark, earthy colors; ominous, almost subliminal sound effects — and when your hero swings from chandeliers or dispatches monsters with his iron flail, a spine-tingling sense of impending doom."

Super Castlevania IV has been praised in retrospective reviews as well. In a 1997 Castlevania retrospective, GamePro said it "is still one of the all-time best games". It was named by Nintendo Power in a 2006 issue as the 66th best game made on a Nintendo system. It was ranked 27 in the last issue. Official Nintendo Magazine placed the game at 70 on their list of the 100 best Nintendo games ever. Game Informer's review opined that it "perfect[ed] the classic formula" due to its whip and less stiff gameplay. It also praised its use of Mode 7. In a review for the release on the Wii U's eShop, Nintendo Life wrote "Unlike many of the other 16-bit platformers of the era, the game has a mature and distinguished feel to it", and concluded it was the best of the original Castlevania installments. In 2018, Complex listed the game 13th on their "The Best Super Nintendo Games of All Time", writing: "Next to Symphony of the Night, this is the best Castlevania game of all time. The control is perfect, the progression is perfect, and even the ramping up of the difficulty is flawless, as it gets difficult in all the right spots. Also, it has the best soundtrack ever." In 1996, GamesMaster ranked the game 55th in its "Top 100 Games of All Time". Several publications have lauded it as one of the greatest video games of all time.
