= Castlevania II: Belmont's Revenge =

1991 video game

- North American box art
- Developer: Konami
- Publisher: Konami
- Programmers: Toru Hagihara; Yukari Hayano
- Artist: Koichi Kimura
- Composer: Hidehiro Funauchi
- Series: Castlevania
- Platform: Game Boy
- Release: Game Boy: JP: July 12, 1991; NA: August 1991; EU: November 26, 1992
- Genre: Platform
- Mode: Single-player

Castlevania II: Belmont's Revenge (Note: Known in Japan as Dracula Densetsu II (ドラキュラ伝説II, Dorakyura Densetsu Tsū; The Legend of Dracula II)) is a 1991 platform game developed and published by Konami for the Game Boy. It is the second Castlevania title for the Game Boy and serves as a sequel to Castlevania: The Adventure. Belmont's Revenge is included in color in the European Konami GB Collection Vol.4 compilation.

Set fifteen years after the events of Castlevania: The Adventure, Dracula returns and kidnaps Christopher Belmont's son Soleil at his coming of age feast, and turns him into a demon. With Soleil's mystical powers, Dracula retakes human form and rebuilds his castle, forcing Christopher to confront Dracula once again to save his son and Transylvania.

== Gameplay ==
Christopher battling a boss

Unlike the previous Game Boy title, sub-weapons in the form of holy water and axes (or the cross in the Japanese version) are available in the game. There are four initial levels, each taking place in a separate castle with a unique theme such as air, plant, earth, and crystal, and can be completed in any order, similar to Mega Man. There are large trap rooms in the levels. The game utilizes a password system.

== Development and release ==
The North American version of the game changes one of the sub-weapons, replacing the cross with an axe. The cross had a long-range horizontal trajectory similar to the fireball whip, while the axe can go in an upward arc motion that can go through walls and barriers. The Konami GB Collection, released in Japan and Europe only, restores the original cross.

The packaging artwork for the North American and European versions was created by Tom Dubois, who designed the packaging for many other Konami titles outside Japan.

The game was released in Japan on July 12, 1991.

The game has seen a re-release for the Castlevania Anniversary Collection in 2019.

== Reception ==
Reception

Review scores
Publication	Score
ACE	880/1000
Aktueller Software Markt	9/12
Electronic Gaming Monthly	8/10, 8/10, 8/10, 8/10
Famitsu	6/10, 6/10, 7/10, 4/10
GamePro	24/25
Games-X	4.5/5
Jeuxvideo.com	17/20
Joypad	86%
Mean Machines Sega	91%
Nintendo Life	9/10
Total!	90%
Video Games (DE)	81%
Power Play	82%

IGN thought the game made better use of the Game Boy's hardware than the first Castlevania handheld game, and applauded its inclusion of traditional Castlevania items, weapons, and having a cleaner graphical aesthetic. It was still hurt, however, by a lack of character speed and its short play time. GameSpy called it one of the best action games on the original Game Boy. Game Informer's Tim Turi considers it the best Castlevania game on the original Game Boy; he cited the improved graphics and use of sub-weapons.
