= List of GameCenter CX episodes =

GameCenter CX (ゲームセンターCX), also known as Retro Game Master in other regions, is a Japanese gaming-variety show television program produced by Fuji Television and Gascoin Company. The name is a combination of "game center" (the Japanese term for an arcade) and Fuji TV's call sign, JOCX-TV. It stars Shinya Arino, a member of comedy duo Yoiko, who plays home console video games from previous decades and usually attempts to get the game's ending within a single day. The show has been on-air since November 4, 2003, with a new episode airing bi-weekly at Thursday midnight on Fuji TV One. As of 2023, 20 DVD sets have been released in Japan. In 2008, Fuji TV was looking for international distributors for subtitled DVDs.

== Game challenges ==
Not counting duplicated appearances, segment-only appearances, and Nintendo eShop episodes, the publisher who made more appearances on the show is Konami with 65 different games.^{(Note: Not including titles from Hudson Soft before their self-absorption, this number goes down to 39.)}

=== Main games ===
NOTE: An asterisk (*) is noted beside the episode number to indicate the episode's localization and release on Kotaku. Western titles in "quotes" are unofficial names Kotaku uses to refer to Japan-only games.

1st season 7 wins, 6 losses

(This season featured a game series or game company as its main focus with Arino's challenge game as a secondary feature)

Ep #	Game Challenge				
Ep #	Japanese Spelling	Romanized	Western Title	System	Cleared or Failed
1 (2003/11/04)	たけしの挑戦状	Takeshi no Chōsenjō (1986)	N/A	Famicom	Cleared
2 (2003/11/18)	アンジェリーク トロワ	Angelique Trois (2001)	N/A	PlayStation 2	Failed^{(Note: Managed to get a Bad Ending)}
3 (2003/12/02)	鉄騎	Tekki (2002)	Steel Battalion (2002)	Xbox	Failed^{(Note: Cleared until Mission 3)}
4 (2003/12/16)	ROOMMANIA#203	Roommania #203 (2000)	N/A	Dreamcast	Cleared^{(Note: Managed to get a Good ending)}
5 (2004/01/13)	スターフォース	Star Force (1985)	Star Force (1987)	Famicom	Cleared
6 (2004/01/27)	アストロロボSASA	Astro Robo Sasa (1985)	N/A	Famicom	Failed
7 (2004/02/10)	ギャラガ	Namco Museum Vol. 1: Galaga (1995)	Namco Museum Vol. 1: Galaga (1996)	PlayStation	Cleared
8 (2004/02/24)	ドアドア	Door Door (1985)	N/A	Famicom	Cleared
9 (2004/03/10)	イーアルカンフー グラディウス ハイパーオリンピック	Yie Ar Kung-Fu (1985); Gradius (1986); Hyper Olympic (1985)	Yie Ar Kung-Fu (1986); Gradius (1986); Track & Field (1987)	Famicom; Famicom; Famicom	Failed^{(Note: Cleared later as a DVD-exclusive challenge)} Failed^{(Note: Cleared later on Episode #136)} Cleared^{(Note: Used a ruler to clear the game)}
10 (2004/03/31)	スーパーマリオブラザーズ スーパーマリオブラザーズ2	Super Mario Bros. (1985); Super Mario Bros. 2 (1986)	Super Mario Bros. (1985); Super Mario Bros.: The Lost Levels	Famicom; Famicom Disk System	Failed; Failed
SP (2004/05/30)	スーパーマリオブラザーズ2（リベンジ企画）	Super Mario Bros. 2 (1986) (Rematch)	Super Mario Bros.: The Lost Levels	Famicom Disk System	Cleared^{(Note: AD and guests helped, did not beat World 9)}

2nd season 6 wins, 3 losses

(episode numbering started with Arino's challenge games being the main feature)

Ep #	Japanese Spelling	Romanized	Western Title	System	Cleared or Failed
1 * (2004/10/20)	アトランチスの謎	Atlantis no Nazo (1986)	The Mystery of Atlantis (2024)	Famicom	Cleared
2 (2004/11/03)	チャレンジャー	Challenger (1986)	N/A	Famicom	Cleared
3 (2004/11/17)	魔界村	Makaimura (1986)	Ghosts 'n Goblins (1986)	Famicom	Failed^{(Note: Only the first run was cleared)}
4 (2004/12/01)	コナミワイワイワールド	Konami Wai Wai World (1988)	N/A	Famicom	Cleared
5 (2004/12/15)	メトロイド	Metroid (1986)	Metroid (video game) (1987)	Famicom Disk System	Cleared
6 * (2005/01/19)	ソロモンの鍵	Solomon no Kagi (1986)	Solomon's Key (1987)	Famicom	Cleared
7/8 (2005/02/02–02/16)	プリンスオブペルシャ	Prince of Persia (1992)	Prince of Persia (1992)	Super Famicom	Cleared
9 (2005/03/02)	ロックマン2 Dr.ワイリーの謎	Rockman 2: Dr. Wily no Nazo (1988)	Mega Man 2 (1989)	Famicom	Failed
10 (2005/03/16)	スーパーマリオブラザーズ3	Super Mario Bros. 3 (1988)	Super Mario Bros. 3 (1990)	Famicom	Failed^{(Note: Cleared later through Wii Virtual Console, finished later in 2026)}

3rd season Complete victory

Ep #	Japanese Spelling	Romanized	Western Title	System	Cleared or Failed
11 (2005/04/13)	カトちゃんケンちゃん	Kato Chan Ken Chan (1988)	J.J. & Jeff (1990)	PC Engine	Cleared
12 (2005/04/27)	突撃!風雲たけし城	Totsugeki! Fūun Takeshi-jō (1988)	N/A	Famicom	Cleared
13 (2005/05/11)	ときめきメモリアル	Tokimeki Memorial (video game) (1996)	N/A	PlayStation	Cleared
14 (2005/05/25)	ファミコンジャンプ英雄列伝	Famicom Jump: Hero Retsuden (1989)	N/A	Famicom	Cleared
15 (2005/06/08)	夢工場ドキドキパニック	Yume Kōjō: Doki Doki Panic (1987)	Super Mario Bros. 2 (1989)	Famicom Disk System	Cleared^{(Note: Beat Mamu only once, AD cleared all stages with all characters)}
16 (2005/06/22)	火の鳥 鳳凰編 我王の冒険	Hi no Tori Hououhen: Gaou no Bouken (1987)	N/A	Famicom	Cleared
17/18 (2005/07/06–07/23)	スーパーマリオワールド	Super Mario World (1990)	Super Mario World (1991)	Super Famicom	Cleared
19 (2005/08/03)	迷宮組曲	Meikyuu Kumikyoku (1987)	Milon's Secret Castle (1988)	Famicom	Cleared
20 (2005/08/31)	ゼルダの伝説 神々のトライフォース	Zelda no Densetsu: Kamigami no Tri-Force (1992)	The Legend of Zelda: A Link to the Past (1992)	Super Famicom	Cleared

4th season 5 wins, 4 losses

(The season mascot changes from King to Queen)

Ep #	Japanese Spelling	Romanized	Western Title	System	Cleared or Failed
21 (2005/10/19)	ウルトラマン	Ultraman (1991)	Ultraman: Towards the Future (1991)	Super Famicom	Failed^{(Note: Missed final shot at the final boss)}
22 (2005/11/02)	ファイナルファイト	Final Fight (1991)	Final Fight (1991)	Super Famicom	Failed
23 (2005/11/16)	高橋名人の冒険島	Takahashi Meijin no Boukenjima (1986)	Adventure Island (1988)	Famicom	Failed
24 (2005/11/30)	アクトレイザー	ActRaiser (1991)	ActRaiser (1992)	Super Famicom	Failed^{(Note: Demoted two ranks to Senior Staff)}
25 (2005/12/14)	クイズ殿様の野望	Quiz Tonosama no Yabou (1993)	N/A	CD-ROM^{2}	Cleared^{(Note: promoted two ranks to Chief)}
26 (2006/01/11)	ドラえもん	Doraemon (1986)	Doraemon (2026)	Famicom	Cleared
27/28 (2006/01/25–02/08)	スーパーマリオ64	Super Mario 64 (1996)	Super Mario 64 (1996)	Nintendo 64	Cleared
29 * (2006/02/22)	忍者龍剣伝	Ninja Ryūkenden (1989)	Ninja Gaiden (1989)	Famicom	Cleared
30 (2006/03/08)	光神話 パルテナの鏡	Hikari Shinwa: Palutena no Kagami (1987)	Kid Icarus (1987)	Famicom Disk System	Cleared^{(Note: Managed to get the Worst Ending)}

5th season 5 wins, 1 draw

(Season was shortened due to birth of Arino's daughter)

Ep #	Japanese Spelling	Romanized	Western Title	System	Cleared or Failed
31 (2006/06/07)	海腹川背	Umihara Kawase (video game) (1994)	Umihara Kawase (2015)	Super Famicom	Draw^{(Note: Both Arino and ADs managed to get the same ending all the times)}
32 (2006/06/21)	魂斗羅	Contra (1988)	Contra / Probotector (1988)	Famicom	Cleared
33 * (2006/07/05)	ボナンザブラザーズ	Bonanza Brothers (1991)	Bonanza Bros. (1991)	Mega Drive	Cleared
34 (2006/07/19)	大魔界村	Dai Makaimura (1989)	Ghouls 'n Ghosts (1989)	Mega Drive	Cleared
35 (2006/08/02)	サラダの国のトマト姫	Salad no Kuni no Tomato Hime (1988)	Princess Tomato in the Salad Kingdom (1991)	Famicom	Cleared
36 (2006/08/30)	妖怪道中記	Youkai Douchuki (1988)	Youkai Douchuki (2022)	PC Engine	Failed^{(Note: Cleared with the second Bad ending)}

6th season 4 wins, 3 losses

(The season mascot changes from Queen to Dark King)

Ep #	Japanese Spelling	Romanized	Western Title	System	Cleared or Failed
37 (2006/11/01)	ストリートファイター2	Street Fighter 2 (1992)	Street Fighter II (1992)	Super Famicom	Failed^{(Note: Arcade mode cleared, lost against staff)}
38 (2006/11/15)	悪魔城伝説	Akumajō Densetsu (1989)	Castlevania III: Dracula's Curse (1990)	Famicom	Failed^{(Note: Skipped through Level 7–5 with a password, failed against Dracula's third form)}
39* (2006/11/29)	マイティボンジャック	Mighty Bomb Jack (1986)	Mighty Bomb Jack (1987)	Famicom	Failed^{(Note: Cleared later in Episode #41)}
40 (2006/12/13)	レッドアリーマー2	Red Arremer 2 (1992)	Gargoyle's Quest II (1993)	Famicom	Failed
41 (2007/01/10)	マイティボンジャック	Mighty Bomb Jack (1986) (Live show, 2006/12/23)	Mighty Bomb Jack (1987)	Famicom	Cleared
42 (2007/01/24)	アドベンチャークイズ・カプコンワールド ハテナの大冒険	Adventure Quiz Capcom World: Hatena no Daibouken (1992)	N/A	Super CD-ROM^{2}	Cleared
43 * (2007/02/07)	セプテントリオン	Septentrion (1993)	SOS (1994)	Super Famicom	Cleared^{(Note: Bad Ending, but still ruled as "Cleared" by Arino)}
44 (2007/02/21)	バイオミラクル ぼくってウパ	Bio Miracle Bokutte Upa (1988)	Bio Miracle Bokutte Upa (2008)	Famicom Disk System	Cleared

7th season 7 wins, 1 loss, 1 carryover

(the season changes from Dark King to King. The Dark King makes a brief reappearance in #53. Sarina Suzuki from Mecha^{2} Iketeru! appeared as a guest in the Tamage segment on episode #45)

Ep #	Japanese Spelling	Romanized	Western Title	System	Cleared or Failed
45 (2007/05/02)	ウルトラセブン	Ultraseven (1993)	N/A	Super Famicom	Cleared
46 (2007/05/16)	ロックマン	Rockman (1988)	Mega Man (1988)	Famicom	Cleared
47 (2007/05/30)	ワギャンランド	Wagyan Land (1989)	N/A	Famicom	Cleared
48 (2007/06/13)	アウターワールド	Outer World (1993)	Another World (1993) (Europe); Out Of This World (1993) (North America)	Super Famicom	Cleared
49 (2007/06/27)	がんばれゴエモン ゆき姫救出絵巻	Ganbare Goemon: Yukihime Kyuushutsu Emaki (1991)	The Legend of the Mystical Ninja (1992)	Super Famicom	Failed
50 (2007/07/11)	たまゲーin韓国byエコノミークラス	Trip to Korea by Economy Class	N/A	N/A	N/A
51 (2007/07/25)	六三四の剣 ただいま修行中	Musashi no Ken – Tadaima Shugyō Chū (1986)	N/A	Famicom	Cleared^{(Note: Had a choice to play Ninja Hattori-kun (1986) or GeGeGe no Kitaro: Yōkai Daimakyō (1986), cleared only the first loop, won against staff, AD did the second loop with the ending)}
52 (2007/08/22)	超魔界村	Chō Makaimura (1992)	Super Ghouls 'n Ghosts (1992)	Super Famicom	Cleared
53* (2007/09/05)	クロックタワー	Clock Tower (1995)	Clock Tower: Rewind (2024)	Super Famicom	Cleared^{(Note: Managed to get the Best Ending)}
54 (2007/09/19)	カイの冒険	Kai no Bouken (1988)	The Quest of Ki	Famicom	Failed^{(Note: Stuck on Floor 79)}

8th season 7 wins, 2 losses, 1 pending

Ep #	Japanese Spelling	Romanized	Western Title	System	Cleared or Failed
55 (2007/10/24)	カイの冒険	Kai no Bouken (1988)	The Quest of Ki	Famicom	Failed^{(Note: Stuck on Floor 98)}
56 (2007/11/07)	フラッシュバック	Flashback (1993)	Flashback (1994)	Super Famicom	Cleared
57 (2007/11/21)	ビックリマンワールド	Bikkuriman World (1988)	Wonder Boy in Monster Land (1988)	PC Engine	Cleared
58 (2007/12/05)	仮面の忍者 花丸	Kamen no Ninja Hanamaru (1990)	Yo! Noid (1991)	Famicom	Cleared
59 * (2007/12/19)	スーパーファンタジーゾーン	Super Fantasy Zone (1992)	Super Fantasy Zone (1992)	Mega Drive	Failed
Christmas Eve Live 2007 (2007/12/24)	カイの冒険	Kai no Bouken (1988)	The Quest of Ki	Famicom	Cleared^{(Note: Spelunker (1985) was used as a backup plan if Arino managed to clear the game earlier, ended up as a DVD-exclusive challenge)}
60 (2008/01/16)	PC原人	PC-Genjin (1989)	Bonk's Adventure / PC Kid (1990)	PC Engine	Cleared
61 * (2008/01/30)	東海道五十三次	Tōkaidō Gojūsan-tsugi (1986)	Firework Thrower Kantaro's 53 Stations of the Tokaido (2024)	Famicom	Failed
62 (2008/02/13)	悪魔城すぺしゃる ぼくドラキュラくん	Akumajō Special: Boku Dracula-kun (1990)	Kid Dracula (2019)	Famicom	Cleared
63 (2008/02/27)	クインティ	Quinty (1989)	Mendel Palace (1991)	Famicom	Cleared

9th season Complete victory

(The season was shortened due to Arino being hospitalized; all episodes from #64 and onwards started to be in HD and 60FPS)

Ep #	Japanese Spelling	Romanized	Western Title	System	Cleared or Failed
64 (2008/06/18)	ソニック・ザ・ヘッジホッグ	Sonic the Hedgehog (1991)	Sonic the Hedgehog (1991)	Mega Drive	Cleared^{(Note: Cleared without any Chaos Emeralds)}
65 (2008/07/02)	課長の海外出張inカンヌ映画祭	Kachou no Kaigai Shucchou in Cannes Eigaisai	The Kacho Goes to the Cannes Film Festival	N/A	N/A^{(Note: Aired during Arino's rest in the hospital, several legacy segments were aired as reprises)}
66 (2008/07/16)	おかえり!課長リターンズスペシャル	Okaeri! Kachou Returns Special	Super Mario Bros. (1986); Dr. Mario (1991)	Famicom	Failed^{(Note: Warped to World 3)} Cleared^{(Note: Won against AD Nakayama)}
67 (2008/07/30)	暴れん坊天狗	Abarenbou Tengu (1991)	Zombie Nation (1991)	Famicom	Cleared
Investigation Office Special Mission (2008/07/30)	ゲームセンターCX興業 特命課調査室 セガ「三国志大戦・天」編	Sangokushi Taisen Ten (2008)	N/A	Nintendo DS	N/A^{(Note: Aired as a short special featuring Arino plus Toshi Kato from Unagi)}
68 * (2008/09/03)	マドゥーラの翼	Madoola no Tsubasa (1987)	The Wing of Madoola (2024)	Famicom	Cleared
69 (2008/09/17)	ドラゴンスレイヤーIV	Dragon Slayer IV (1987)	Legacy of the Wizard (1989)	Famicom	Cleared

10th season 6 wins, 1 loss

Ep #	Japanese Spelling	Romanized	Western Title	System	Cleared or Failed
70 (2008/10/22)	ドラゴンボール 神龍の謎	Dragon Ball: Shenron no Nazo (1987)	Dragon Power (1988) (NA); DragonBall (1990) (EU)	Famicom	Failed
71 (2008/11/05)	チェルノブ	Chelnov (1993)	Atomic Runner (1993)	Mega Drive	Cleared
72 (2008/11/19)	ゆうゆのクイズでGO!GO!	Yuuyu no Quiz de GO! GO! (1993)	N/A	Super Famicom	Cleared
73 (2008/12/03)	レミングス	Lemmings (1992)	Lemmings (1992)	Super Famicom	Cleared^{(Note: Cleared on Tricky difficulty over Taxing, cleared later as part of a live show)}
74 (2009/01/07)	ファーストサムライ	First Samurai (1993)	First Samurai (1993)	Super Famicom	Cleared
75/76 (2009/01/21–02/04)	スーパードンキーコング	Super Donkey Kong (1995)	Donkey Kong Country (1995)	Super Famicom	Cleared
77 (2009/02/18)	餓狼伝説スペシャル	Garou Densetsu Special (1994)	Fatal Fury Special (1994)	Neo Geo	Cleared^{(Note: Failed to beat the game in Normal mode, considered a clear due to beating all characters and the Final Boss plus hidden characters through a Memory Card)}
Live Broadcast Special (2009/04/12)	ゲームセンターCX 生放送スペシャル	Takeshi no Chōsenjō (1986)	N/A	Famicom	Failed^{(Note: Cleared later after the broadcast)}

11th season 7 wins, 3 losses

Ep #	Japanese Spelling	Romanized	Western Title	System	Cleared or Failed
78 (2009/04/14)	福岡里帰りスペシャル	Fukuoka Hometown Special	N/A	N/A	N/A
79 (2009/04/28)	レイラ	Layla (1987)	N/A	Famicom	Failed
80 (2009/05/12)	星のカービィ夢の泉の物語	Hoshi no Kābī: Yume no Izumi no Monogatari (1993)	Kirby's Adventure (1993)	Famicom	Cleared
81 * (2009/05/26)	バトルゴルファー唯	Battle Golfer Yui (1991)	N/A	Mega Drive	Cleared^{(Note: Also won against staff in the DVD versions of the episode)}
82/83 (2009/06/09–06/23)	ロックマン3 Dr.ワイリーの最期!?	Rockman 3: Dr. Wily no Saigo!? (1990)	Mega Man 3 (1991)	Famicom	Cleared
84 (2009/07/07)	すーぱーぐっすんおよよ	Super Gussun Oyoyo (1995)	Risky Challenge (1993)	Super Famicom	Cleared
85 (2009/07/21)	源平討魔伝	Genpei Tōma Den (1990)	The Genji and the Heike Clans (1997)	PC Engine	Failed
86 (2009/08/04)	パンチアウト!!	Punch-Out!! (1988)	Punch-Out!! (1987 video game) (1988)	Famicom	Failed
87 * (2009/08/18)	ゴールデンアックス	Golden Axe (1990)	Golden Axe (1990)	Mega Drive	Cleared
24-hour challenge (2009/08/29)	レミングス	Lemmings (1992)	Lemmings (1992)	Super Famicom	Cleared^{(Note: Cleared most levels on Taxing difficulty, several levels were beaten by ADs due to time constraints in Arino's schedule)}
88 (2009/09/01)	ディグダグII	Dig Dug II (1986)	Dig Dug II (1990)	Famicom	Cleared
89 (24-hour challenge Documentary) (2009/09/15)	ドキュメント24	Document24	N/A	N/A	N/A

12th season 4 wins, 5 losses

(The season mascot changes from King to Fallen Warrior)

Ep #	Japanese Spelling	Romanized	Western Title	System	Cleared or Failed
90 (2009/10/13)	ドラゴンバスター	Dragon Buster (1987)	Dragon Buster (1985)	Famicom	Cleared
91 (2009/10/27)	カケフくんのジャンプ天国 スピード地獄	Kakefu Kun no Jump Tengoku: Speed Jigoku (1988)	Kid Kool and the Quest for the Seven Wonder Herbs (1990)	Famicom	Failed
92/93 (2009/11/10–11/24)	不思議のダンジョン2 風来のシレン	Fushigi no Dungeon 2: Fūrai no Shiren (1995)	Mystery Dungeon 2: Shiren the Wanderer (1995)	Super Famicom	Cleared
94 (2009/12/08)	電車でGO!	Densha de Go! (video game) (1998)	N/A	PlayStation	Failed^{(Note: Both Arino and AD managed to get a Bad Ending, member from staff managed to get the Best Ending)}
95 (2010/01/05)	2010 ストリートファイター	2010 Street Fighter (1990)	Street Fighter 2010: The Final Fight (1990)	Famicom	Failed
96/97 (2010/01/19–02/02)	忍者龍剣伝II 暗黒の邪神剣	Ninja Ryūkenden II: Ankoku no Jashinken (1990)	Ninja Gaiden II: The Dark Sword of Chaos (1990)	Famicom	Cleared
98 (2010/02/16)	パイロットウイングス	Pilotwings (1991)	Pilotwings (1991)	Super Famicom	Failed^{(Note: Tried to revenge in a special live later)}
99 (2010/03/16)	レインボーアイランド	Rainbow Islands (1988)	Rainbow Islands: The Story of Bubble Bobble 2 (1991)	Famicom	Failed
100 (2010/03/30)	レッキングクルー	Wrecking Crew (1985)	Wrecking Crew (1986)	Famicom	Cleared^{(Note: Game has no Ending, all stages cleared)}

13th season

(The season mascot changes from Fallen Warrior to King, it was shortened due to Arino getting a free rest of 100 days)

Ep #	Japanese Spelling	Romanized	Western Title	System	Cleared or Failed
101 (2010/07/22)	ゴルゴ13 第一章 神々の黄昏	Golgo 13: Kamigami no Tasogare (1988)	Golgo 13: Top Secret Episode (1988)	Famicom	Cleared
102 (2010/08/05)	す〜ぱ〜ぷよぷよ	Super Puyo Puyo (1994)	Kirby's Avalanche (1995) (NA); Kirby's Ghost Trap (1995) (EU)	Super Famicom	Failed^{(Note: Failure at both 1 Player Mode (Hardest difficulty) and lost against staff)}
103 (2010/08/19)	甲子園	Koushien (1989)	Little League Baseball: Championship Series (1990)	Famicom	Failed
104 (2010/09/09)	ゲゲゲの鬼太郎 復活! 天魔大王	Gegege No Kitarō: Fukkatsu! Tenma Daiou (1993)	N/A	Super Famicom	Cleared
105 (2010/09/23)	北海道連鎖殺人 オホーツクに消ゆ	Hokkaido Rensa Satsujin: Ohotsuku ni Kiyu (1987)	The Hokkaido Serial Murder Case: The Okhotsk Disappearance (2024)	Famicom	Cleared
106 (2010/10/07)	「ドラクエ」を創った男 堀井雄二スペシャル	Yuji Horii Interview Special (no game)	N/A	N/A	N/A

14th season

Ep #	Japanese Spelling	Romanized	Western Title	System	Cleared or Failed
107 (2010/10/28)	パリ・ダカール ラリー・スペシャル	Paris-Dakar Rally Special (1988)	N/A	Famicom	Cleared^{(Note: Did not manage to get the Best Ending)}
108 (2010/11/11)	ジェリーボーイ	Jerry Boy (1991)	Smart Ball (1992)	Super Famicom	Cleared
109/110 (2010/11/25–12/09)	ゼルダの伝説 時のオカリナ	Zelda no Densetsu: Toki no Ocarina (1998)	The Legend of Zelda: Ocarina of Time (1998)	Nintendo 64	Cleared^{(Note: ADs played the game for most of the part due to Arino's slow progress)}
New Year Live Special (2010/12/31–2011/01/01)	星のカービィスーパーデラックス	Hoshi no Kābī Sūpā Derakkusu (1996)	Kirby Super Star (1996)	Super Famicom	Cleared
111 (2011/01/06)	スーパースターフォース 時空暦の秘密	Super Star Force: Jikūreki no Himitsu (1987)	N/A	Famicom	Failed
112 (2011/01/20)	最後の忍道	Saigo no Nindou (1990)	Ninja Spirit (1990)	PC Engine	Cleared
113 (2011/02/03)	かまいたちの夜	Kamaitachi no Yoru (1995)	Banshee's Last Cry	Super Famicom	Cleared
114/115 (2011/02/17–03/03)	ロックマン4 新たなる野望!!	Rockman 4: Arata Naru Yabō! (1992)	Mega Man 4 (1992)	Famicom	Cleared
116 (2011/03/17)	バベルの塔	Babel no Tō (1986)	Tower of Babel (2023)	Famicom	Failed^{(Note: Failed to match the last two figures for the secret password)}

15th season

Ep #	Japanese Spelling	Romanized	Western Title	System	Cleared or Failed
117 (2011/04/14)	ギミック!	Gimmick! (1992)	Mr. Gimmick (1993)	Famicom	Cleared^{(Note: Managed to get the Bad Ending, a secondary copy of the game with the last stage was frozen by a small hit in the cartridge, forcing the AD to get the Good Ending)}
118/119 (2011/04/28–05/12)	F-ZERO	F-ZERO (1991)	F-Zero (1991)	Super Famicom	Cleared^{(Note: Standard difficulty only, cleared later on Expert as a presential-only event)}
120 (2011/05/26)	タントアール	Tant-R (1994)	N/A	Mega Drive	Cleared
121 (2011/06/09)	バイオ戦士DAN	Bio Senshi DAN (1987)	Bio Warrior DAN The Increaser War (2024)	Famicom	Cleared
122 (2011/06/23)	コミックスゾーン	Comix Zone (1995)	Comix Zone (1995)	Mega Drive	Failed
123 (2011/07/07)	カービィボウル	Kirby Bowl (1994)	Kirby's Dream Course (1995)	Super Famicom	Cleared
124 (2011/07/21)	メタルストーム	Metal Storm (1992)	Metal Storm (1991)	Famicom	Failed
125 (2011/08/11)	子育てクイズ マイエンジェル	Kosodate Quiz My Angel (1998)	N/A	PlayStation	Cleared
126 (2011/09/08)	バトルフォーミュラ	Battle Formula (1991)	Super Spy Hunter (1992)	Famicom	Failed
127 (2011/09/22)	ハロー!パックマン	Hello! Pac-Man (1994)	Pac-Man 2: The New Adventures (1994)	Super Famicom	Cleared
2 Hour Special (2011/10/06)	GameCenter CX in USA/RoboCop	RoboCop (1989)	RoboCop (1989)	Famicom	Cleared
128 (2011/10/20)	ストライダー飛竜	Strider Hiryu (1990)	Strider (1990)	Mega Drive	Cleared
129 (2011/11/03)	飛龍の拳 奥義の書	Hiryū no Ken: Ougi no Sho (1987)	Flying Dragon: The Secret Scroll (1989)	Famicom	Failed^{(Note: Completed the first loop in 12 hours, AD did the second loop)}
130 (2011/11/17)	聖闘士星矢 黄金伝説	Saint Seiya: Ougon Densetsu (1987)	Les Chevaliers du Zodiaque: La Legende d'Or (1991)	Famicom	Cleared
131 (2011/12/01)	天下のご意見番 水戸黄門	Tenka no Goikenban: Mito Koumon (1987)	N/A	Famicom	Failed
132/133 (2011/12/15–2012/01/12)	バトルトード	Battletoads (1992)	Battletoads (1991 video game) (1991)	Famicom	Cleared
134 (2012/01/26)	探偵神宮寺三郎 新宿中央公園殺人事件	Tantei Jingūji Saburō: Shinjuku Chūō Kōen Satsujin Jiken (1987)	Jake Hunter: The Petty Murder of a Fragile Heart (2008)	Famicom Disk System	Cleared
135 (2012/02/09)	アレックスキッドのミラクルワールド	Alex Kidd no Miracle World (1987)	Alex Kidd in Miracle World (1987)	Sega Mark III	Failed
Birthday Live 2012 (2012/02/24)	パイロットウイングス	Pilotwings (1991)	Pilotwings (1991)	Super Famicom	Failed^{(Note: Cleared later in a event aired later as episode 143)}
136 (2012/03/08)	グラディウス	Gradius (1986)	Gradius (1987)	Famicom	Cleared

16th season

Ep #	Japanese Spelling	Romanized	Western Title	System	Cleared or Failed
137 (2012/04/12)	スーパーチャイニーズ	Super Chinese (1986)	Kung Fu Heroes (1989)	Famicom	Failed
138/139 (2012/04/26–05/10)	ダイナマイト・ヘッディー	Dynamite Headdy (1994)	Dynamite Headdy (1994)	Mega Drive	Cleared
140 (2012/05/24)	カットビ!宅配くん	Kattobi! Takuhai-kun (1991)	N/A	PC Engine	Failed
141/142 (2012/06/07–06/21)	キャプテン翼	Captain Tsubasa (1988)	Tecmo Cup Soccer Game (1992)	Famicom	Cleared^{(Note: Was supposed to be Failed, as grinding levels and stats after the final match were not allowed. Cleared years later in 2024 through a special event.)}
143 (2012/07/05)	岩手出張スペシャル「パイロットウイングス」完結!?	Iwate Special: Pilotwings Revenge	Pilotwings (1991)	Super Famicom	Cleared
144 (2012/07/19)	ガンデック	Gun-Dec (1991)	Vice: Project Doom (1992)	Famicom	Cleared
145 (2012/08/02)	ファミコン探偵倶楽部 消えた後継者	Famicom Tantei Club: Kieta Kōkeisha (1988)	Famicom Detective Club: The Missing Heir (2021)	Famicom Disk System^{(Note: Due to a Disk Error from the disk itself, the Wii Virtual Console re-release was used for most of the challenge)}	Cleared
146 (2012/09/06)	カルノフ	Karnov (1988)	Karnov (1988)	Famicom	Cleared
147 (2012/09/20)	川のぬし釣り2	Kawa no Nushi Tsuri 2 (1995)	N/A	Super Famicom	Failed
2 Hour Special (2012/10/05)	GameCenter CX in Asia/スーパーマリオカート	Super Mario Kart (1992)	Super Mario Kart (1992)	Super Famicom	Failed^{(Note: Failed to beat the game in 150cc, but won against staff)}
148 (2012/10/25)	パルスマン	Pulseman (1994)	Pulseman (1995)	Mega Drive	Cleared
149 (2012/11/08)	迷宮島	Meikyūjima (1990)	Kickle Cubicle (1990)	Famicom	Cleared
150 (2012/11/22)	パラッパラッパー	Parappa Rappa (1996)	PaRappa the Rapper (1997)	PlayStation	Cleared
151 (2012/12/13)	夢見屋形の物語	Yumemi Yakata no Monogatari (1993)	Mansion of Hidden Souls (1993)	Mega CD	Cleared
152/153 (2013/01/10–01/24)	スーパーマリオ ヨッシーアイランド	Super Mario: Yoshi's Island (1995)	Super Mario World 2: Yoshi's Island (1995)	Super Famicom	Cleared
154/155 (2013/02/07–02/21)	メトロクロス	Metro-Cross (1987)	Metro-Cross (1985)	Famicom	Cleared
156 (2013/03/07)	スペースハンター	Space Hunter (1986)	N/A	Famicom	Cleared

17th season

Ep #	Japanese Spelling	Romanized	Western Title	System	Cleared or Failed
157 (2013/04/11)	ミッキーのマジカルアドベンチャー	Mickey no Magical Adventure (1993)	The Magical Quest Starring Mickey Mouse (1993)	Super Famicom	Cleared
158 (2013/04/25)	ファミリートレーナー ジョギングレース	Family Trainer Jogging Race (1987)	N/A	Famicom	Cleared^{(Note: Finished in 2nd place with the help of multiple ADs)}
159 (2013/05/09)	トム・ソーヤーの冒険	Tomu Sōyā no Bōken (1989)	The Adventures of Tom Sawyer (1989)	Famicom	Cleared
160 (2013/05/23)	超惑星戦記メタファイト	Chô Wakusei Senki Metafight (1988)	Blaster Master (video game) (1989)	Famicom	Failed
161 (2013/06/06)	ベスト競馬 ダービースタリオン	Derby Stallion: Best Keiba (1991)	N/A	Famicom	Failed^{(Note: Cleared later as part of a live event)}
162/163/164 (2013/06/20–07/04-07/18)	スーパードンキーコング2 ディクシー&ディディー	Super Donkey Kong 2: Dixie & Diddy (1996)	Donkey Kong Country 2: Diddy's Kong Quest (1996)	Super Famicom	Cleared
Famicom 30th Anniversary Live Special (2013/07/18)	ファミコン30周年生放送SP	Rockman 2: Dr. Wily no Nazo (1989)	Mega Man 2 (1989)	Wii U (Virtual Console)	Failed^{(Note: Cleared later after the broadcast ended)}
Terrestrial Live Broadcast Special (2013/07/19)	ゲームセンターCX 地上波生挑戦	Super Mario Bros. (1985)	Super Mario Bros. (1985)	Famicom	Failed^{(Note: First time used as an actual challenge in order to celebrate the 15 years of Fuji TV ONE, TWO, and NEXT; cleared later through the Budokan event)}
165 (2013/08/08)	ドラゴンボールZ 超武闘伝	Dragon Ball Z Super Butōden (1993)	Dragon Ball Z (1994)	Super Famicom	Cleared^{(Note: Cleared on Normal difficulty, lost against staff)}
166 (2013/08/22)	闇の仕事人 KAGE	Yami no Shigotonin Kage (1990)	Shadow of the Ninja (1991) (NA); Blue Shadow (1991) (EU)	Famicom	Cleared
167 (2013/09/19)	スカイキッド	Sky Kid (1986)	Sky Kid (1987)	Famicom	Failed
GameCenter CX In Paris (2013/10/14)	ゲームセンターCX in Paris 〜有野課長ジャパンエキスポ参戦〜	Mario & Wario (1993)	N/A	Super Famicom	Failed
168 (2013/10/24)	幽★遊★白書 魔強統一戦	Yū Yū Hakusho Makyō Tōitsusen (1994)	Yu Yu Hakusho: Sunset Fighters (1999)	Mega Drive	Failed^{(Note: Bad Ending in the hardest difficulty, lost against staff)}
169 (2013/11/07)	ニトロパンクス マイトヘッズ	Nitropunks: Mightheads (1993)	Rocky Rodent (1993)	Super Famicom	Failed
170/171 (2013/11/21–12/12)	アイギーナの予言 バルバルークの伝説より	Aigīna no Yogen: Barubarūku no Densetsu Yori (1987)	Aigina's Prophecy	Famicom	Cleared
2 Hour Special Arino's Challenge in Budokan (2014/01/01)	有野の挑戦 in 武道館	Super Mario Bros. (1985); Makaimura (1986); Punch-Out!! (1988); Best Keiba Derby Stallion (1992); Street Fighter 2 (1992)	Super Mario Bros. (1986); Ghosts 'n Goblins (1987); Punch-Out!! (1988); N/A; Street Fighter II (1992)	Famicom / Super Famicom	Cleared (3/5)^{(Note: Full status: Super Mario Bros.: Cleared (World 8–4) Ghosts 'n Goblins: Cleared (Defeated Red Arremer) Punch-Out!!: Failed (Did not defeat Soda Popinski) Derby Stallion: Cleared (Got Nippon Derby Champion) Street Fighter II: Failed (Lost against Manager Noda))}
172 (2014/01/09)	有野の挑戦in武道館 ドキュメント	Arino's Challenge in Budokan Documentary	N/A	N/A	N/A
173 (2014/01/23)	美味しんぼ 究極のメニュー三本勝負	Oishinbo: Kyūkyoku no Menyū Sanbon Shōbu (1989)	N/A	Famicom	Cleared^{(Note: Managed to get all Game Over variants as a bonus)}
174 (2014/02/06)	うっでいぽこ	Woody Poko (1987)	N/A	Famicom	Cleared
175/176 (2014/02/21–03/06)	ノスフェラトゥ	Nosferatu (1994)	Nosferatu (1995)	Super Famicom	Failed^{(Note: Got a Bad Ending due to clearing the Final Boss with zero continues)}

18th season

(The season mascot changes from the King to Elephant King)

Ep #	Japanese Spelling	Romanized	Western Title	System	Cleared or Failed
177 (2014/04/10)	竜の子ファイター	Tatsu no Ko Fighter (1990)	N/A	PC Engine	Cleared
178/179 (2014/04/24–05/08)	ロックマンX	Rockman X (1993)	Mega Man X (1994)	Super Famicom	Cleared
180 (2014/05/22)	殺意の階層 パワーソフト連続殺人事件	Satsui no Kaisou: Power Soft Renzoku Satsujin Jiken (1988)	N/A	Famicom	Failed
181 (2014/06/05)	ガンスターヒーローズ	Gunstar Heroes (1993)	Gunstar Heroes (1993)	Mega Drive	Cleared
182 (2014/06/19)	天下一武士 ケルナグール	Tenkaichi Bushi Keru Nagūru (1989)	N/A	Famicom	Cleared^{(Note: Managed to get the Normal Ending)}
183 (2014/07/03)	超ゴジラ	Chō-Gojira (1994)	Super Godzilla (1994)	Super Famicom	Cleared
184 (2014/07/17)	スーパーマリオランド	Super Mario Land (1989)	Super Mario Land (1989)	Game Boy	Cleared
185/186 (2014/08/07–08/21)	ファミリージョッキー	Family Jockey (1987)	N/A	Famicom	Cleared
187 (2014/09/18)	シャドー・ダンサー	Shadow Dancer (1991)	Shadow Dancer: The Secret of Shinobi (1991)	Mega Drive	Cleared
188 (2014/10/23)	平成天才バカボン	Heisei Tensai Bakabon (1992)	N/A	Famicom	Cleared
189 (2014/11/06)	マジックソード	Magic Sword (1992)	Magic Sword (1992)	Super Famicom	Cleared
190 (2014/11/20)	Dの食卓	D no Shokutaku (1995)	D (1995/1996)	Saturn	Cleared^{(Note: Managed to get both Bad and Good Endings)}
191 (2014/12/11)	クレイジー・クライマー	Crazy Climber (1986)	Crazy Climber (2026)	Famicom	Failed^{(Note: Failed to clear the secret stages in a single continue run)}
192 (2015/01/08)	超絶倫人ベラボーマン	Chō Zetsurin Jin: Berabōman (1990)	Bravoman (1990)	PC Engine	Failed
193 (2015/01/22)	R-TYPE	R-Type (1988)	R-Type (1989)	PC Engine	Failed^{(Note: Cleared Part I only)}
194 (2015/02/05)	伝説の騎士エルロンド	Densetsu no Kishi Elrond (1988)	Wizards & Warriors (1988)	Famicom	Cleared
195 (2015/02/19)	戦場の狼	Senjō no Ōkami (1986)	Commando (1987)	Famicom	Cleared
196 (2015/03/05)	謎の村雨城	Nazo no Murasame Jō (1986)	The Mysterious Murasame Castle (2014)	Famicom Disk System	Failed

19th season

Ep #	Japanese Spelling	Romanized	Western Title	System	Cleared or Failed
197/198 (2015/04/09–04/23)	I.Q インテリジェントキューブ	I.Q Intelligent Qube (1997)	Intelligent Qube (1997)	PlayStation	Cleared^{(Note: Cleared in the easiest difficulty, AD managed to get the Ending in the hardest difficulty)}
199 (2015/05/07)	QUIZなないろDREAMS 虹色町の奇跡	Quiz Nanairo Dreams: Nijiiro Machi no Kiseki (1997)	N/A	PlayStation	Failed
200 (2015/05/21)	全日本プロレス	Zen-Nippon Pro Wrestling (1993)	N/A	Super Famicom	Cleared^{(Note: Also won against staff)}
201 (2015/06/04)	ダブルドラゴン	Double Dragon (1988)	Double Dragon (video game) (1987)	Famicom	Failed^{(Note: Cleared later as a part of a presential-only event)}
202/203 (2015/07/02–07/16)	忍者くん 阿修羅ノ章	Ninja-kun: Ashura no Shō (1988)	N/A	Famicom	Cleared
2 Hour Special (2015/07/18)	GameCenter CX in Vietnam/ナムコミュージアム Vol.4: イシターの復活	Namco Museum Vol.4: Ishtar no Fukkatsu (1997)	Namco Museum Vol.4: The Return of Ishtar (1997)	PlayStation	Failed
204 (2015/08/13)	山村美紗サスペンス 京都龍の寺殺人事件	Yamamura Misa Suspense: Kyōto Ryuu no Tera Satsujin (1988)	N/A	Famicom	Cleared
205 (2015/09/10)	モグラ〜ニャ	Mogurā~nya (1996)	Mole Mania (1997)	Game Boy	Failed
206 (2015/10/08)	闘いの挽歌	Tatakai no Banka (1987)	Trojan (1987)	Famicom	Cleared
207 (2015/10/22)	サイバーポリス イースワット	Cyber Police ESWAT (1990)	ESWAT: City Under Siege (1990)	Mega Drive	Cleared
208 (2015/11/05)	改造町人シュビビンマン	Kaizou Choujin Shubibinman (1989)	Cyber Citizen Shockman (2023)	PC Engine	Cleared
209/210 (2015/11/19–12/03)	THE LEGEND OF ZELDA 2 リンクの冒険	THE LEGEND OF ZELDA 2: Link no Bouken (1987)	Zelda II: The Adventure of Link (1988)	Famicom Disk System	Failed^{(Note: Managed to clear later as a rushed New Year Live Special, all footage of the ending was shown in episode #211)}
211 (2016/01/14)	TAITO CHASE H.Q.	Taito Chase H.Q. (1990)	Chase H.Q. (1992)	PC Engine	Cleared
212 (2016/01/28)	オリビアのミステリー	Olivia no Mystery (1994)	N/A	Super Famicom	Cleared^{(Note: Managed to get a Bad Ending due to strict time limits from the game itself)}
213 (2016/02/11)	THE 功夫	The Kung Fu (1988)	China Warrior (1989)	PC Engine	Cleared
214 (2016/02/25)	夢ペンギン物語	Yume Penguin Monogatari (1991)	N/A	Famicom	Cleared^{(Note: Cleared in 1 hour and 35 minutes, the fastest time clear ever)}
215 (2016/03/10)	セクロス	Seicross (1986)	Seicross (1989)	Famicom	Failed
216 (2016/03/24)	スーパーマリオランド2 6つの金貨	Super Mario Land 2: Muttsu no Kinka (1993)	Super Mario Land 2: 6 Golden Coins (1993)	Game Boy	Cleared

20th season

Ep #	Japanese Spelling	Romanized	Western Title	System	Cleared or Failed
217/218 (2016/04/21–05/05)	サルゲッチュ	Saru Getchu (1999)	Ape Escape (1999)	PlayStation	Cleared
219 (2016/05/19)	アルゴスの戦士 はちゃめちゃ大進撃	Argos no Senshi: Hachamecha Daishingeki (1987)	Rygar (1987)	Famicom	Cleared
220/221 (2016/06/02–06/16)	超兄貴	Cho Aniki (1993)	Cho Aniki (2008)	Super CD-ROM^{2}	Cleared
222 (2016/07/07)	ワギャンランド2	Wagan Land 2 (1991)	N/A	Famicom	Cleared
223 (2016/07/21)	おそ松くん はちゃめちゃ劇場	Osomatsu-kun: Hachamecha Gekijō (1989)	N/A	Mega Drive	Cleared
224 (2016/08/04)	地底戦空バゾルダー	Vazolder: The Underground Battle Space (1992)	Wurm: Journey to the Center of the Earth (1992)	Famicom	Cleared
225 (2016/09/01)	獣王記	Jūōki (1989)	Altered Beast (1989)	Mega Drive	Cleared
226 (2016/10/13)	ゲームセンターCX in 四国/奇々怪界	KiKi KaiKai (1990)	KiKi KaiKai (2020)	PC Engine	Failed^{(Note: Managed to get the Bad Ending, tried to clear during a New Year Live special and ran out of continues to play, leading to a Game Over)}
227 (2016/10/27)	メソポタミア	Mesopotamia (1992)	Somer Assault (1992)	PC Engine	Cleared
228 (2016/11/10)	クイズ殿様の野望2 全国版	Quiz Tonosama no Yabō 2: Zenkoku-ban (1995)	N/A	Arcade^{(Note: Uses a proper CP System board with necessary hookups to the monitor and an external Arcade Stick)}	Cleared^{(Note: Won with the help of staff, including Producer Kan)}
229 (2016/11/24)	コスモポリス ギャリバン	Cosmo Police Galivan (1988)	N/A	Famicom	Failed
230/231 (2016/12/08–12/22)	クロックタワー2	Clock Tower 2 (1997)	Clock Tower (1998)	PlayStation	Cleared
232 (2017/01/19)	人間兵器デッドフォックス	Ningen Heiki Dead Fox (1990)	Code Name: Viper (1990)	Famicom	Cleared
233 (2017/02/02)	F-ZERO X	F-ZERO X (1998)	F-Zero X (1999)	Nintendo 64	Cleared^{(Note: All cups on Novice difficulty)}
234 (2017/02/16)	ピザポップ!	Pizza Pop! (1992)	Pizza Pop! (2024)	Famicom	Cleared
235 (2017/03/02)	SUPER魂斗羅	Super Contra (1990)	Super C (1990)	Famicom	Cleared
236 (2017/03/16)	メルヘンメイズ	Märchen Maze (1991)	N/A	PC Engine	Incomplete^{(Note: Continued on episode 237)}

21st season

(During Episode 244, the staff switched to a CRT monitor during the light gun stages.)

Ep #	Japanese Spelling	Romanized	Western Title	System	Cleared or Failed
237 (2017/04/20)	メルヘンメイズ	Märchen Maze (1991)	N/A	PC Engine	Failed^{(Note: Cleared later in a event)}
238 (2017/05/04)	熱血硬派くにおくん	Nekketsu Kōha Kunio-kun (1987)	Renegade (1988)	Famicom	Cleared
239 (2017/05/18)	電車でGO!64	Densha de Go! 64 (1999)	N/A	Nintendo 64	Cleared
240 (2017/06/01)	ウンジャマ・ラミー	Um Jammer Lammy (1999)	Um Jammer Lammy (1999)	PlayStation	Failed^{(Note: Tried to revenge in a presential-only event, but failed as well.)}
241/242 (2017/06/15–07/06)	スプラッターハウス PARTII	Splatterhouse Part II (1992)	Splatterhouse 2 (1992)	Mega Drive	Cleared
243 (2017/07/20)	ゲームセンターCX on 太平洋/忍者龍剣伝III 黄泉の方船	Ninja Ryūkenden III: Yomi no Hakobune (1991)	Ninja Gaiden III: The Ancient Ship of Doom (1991)	Famicom	Cleared
244 (2017/08/03)	マッド・シティ	Mad City (1988)	The Adventures of Bayou Billy (1989)	Famicom	Cleared^{(Note: Managed to get both Bad and Good endings)}
245 (2017/09/07)	西村京太郎ミステリー ブルートレイン殺人事件	Nishimura Kyōtarō Mystery: Blue Train Satsujin Jiken (1989)	N/A	Famicom	Cleared
246 (2017/10/05)	SUPER R-TYPE	Super R-Type (1991)	Super R-Type (1991)	Super Famicom	Cleared
247 (2017/10/19)	アースワーム・ジム	Earthworm Jim (1995)	Earthworm Jim (1994)	Super Famicom	Cleared
248 (2017/11/02)	PC原人2	PC-Genjin 2 (1991)	Bonk's Revenge / PC Kid 2 (1991)	PC Engine	Cleared
249 (2017/11/16)	激写ボーイ	Gekisha Boy (1993)	N/A	PC Engine	Cleared
250/251 (2017/12/07–12/21)	ドラゴンクエスト	Dragon Quest (1986)	Dragon Warrior (1989)	Famicom	Cleared
252 (2018/01/18)	天地を喰らう	Tenchi wo Kurau (1994)	Dynasty Wars (1994)	Super CD-ROM^{2}	Cleared
253 (2018/02/01)	バザールでござーるのゲームでござーる	Bazaru de Gozaru no Gemu Degozaru (1996)	N/A	Super CD-ROM^{2}	Cleared
254 (2018/02/15)	バーチャファイター2	Virtua Fighter 2 (1996)	Virtua Fighter 2 (1996)	Saturn	Cleared^{(Note: Also won against the staff)}
255 (2018/03/01)	新日本プロレスリング超戦士IN闘強導夢	Shin Nippon Pro Wrestling: Chou Senshi in Tokyo Dome (1993)	N/A	Super Famicom	Failed^{(Note: Also lost against the staff)}
256 (2018/03/15)	ワイルドガンズ	Wild Guns (1994)	Wild Guns (1995)	Super Famicom	Cleared

22nd season

Ep #	Japanese Spelling	Romanized	Western Title	System	Cleared or Failed
257/258 (2018/04/19-05/10)	ロックマンX2	Rockman X2 (1994)	Mega Man X2 (1995)	Super Famicom	Cleared
259 (2018/05/24)	ワンダーモモ	Wonder Momo (1989)	Wonder Momo (2022)	PC Engine	Cleared
260 (2018/06/07)	魔獣王	Majyūō (1995)	Majyūō: King of Demons (2024)	Super Famicom	Failed^{(Note: Cleared later through the Makuhari Messe event)}
261 (2018/06/21)	ポケットザウルス 十王剣の謎	Pocket Saurus Jūōken no nazo (1987)	N/A	Famicom	Failed
262 (2018/07/05)	星のカービィ64	Hoshi no Kirby 64 (2000)	Kirby 64: The Crystal Shards (2000)	Nintendo 64	Failed^{(Note: Managed to get a Bad Ending, lost against the staff in a minigame battle)}
263/264 (2018/07/19-08/09)	キャプテン翼II スーパーストライカー	Captain Tsubasa II: Super Striker (1990)	N/A	Famicom	Cleared
265 (2018/09/06)	影の伝説	The Legend of Kage (1986)	The Legend of Kage (1987)	Famicom	Cleared^{(Note: Managed to clear both loops)}
266 (2018/10/11)	チョロQ	Choro Q (1996)	Penny Racers (1996)	PlayStation	Cleared
267 (2018/10/25)	ザ・キングオブドラゴンズ	The King of Dragons (1994)	The King of Dragons (1994)	Super Famicom	Cleared
268 (2018/11/08)	らんま1/2	Ranma ½ (1990)	N/A	CD-ROM^{2}	Cleared
269 (2018/11/22)	スーパーボンバーマン	Sūpā Bonbāman (1993)	Super Bomberman (1993)	Super Famicom	Cleared
270 (2018/12/06)	バンパイアキラー	Vampire Killer (1994)	Castlevania: Bloodlines (1994)	Mega Drive	Cleared
271 (2018/12/20)	ローリングサンダー	Rolling Thunder (1989)	Rolling Thunder (1989)	Famicom	Failed^{(Note: Had less time than normal due to a strict time schedule on the same day)}
Arino's Challenge in Makuhari Messe (2019/01/01)	有野の生挑戦 in 幕張メッセ	Ninja Ryūkenden (1989); Bomberman (1990); Super Mario Bros. 2 (1986); Märchen Maze (1990); Punch-Out!! (1987); Septentrion (1993); Majyūō (1995)	Ninja Gaiden (1989); Bomberman (1991); Super Mario Bros.: The Lost Levels (2007); N/A; Mike Tyson's Punch-Out!! (1987); SOS (1994); Majyūō: King of Demons (2024)	Wii U (Virtual Console); PC Engine; Wii U (Virtual Console); PC Engine; Famicom; Super Famicom; Super Famicom	Cleared (5/7)^{(Note: Full status: Ninja Gaiden: Cleared Bomberman: Failed (lost against Abe) Super Mario Bros. 2: Cleared (8-2) Märchen Maze: Cleared Punch-Out!!: Failed (Lost against Soda Popinski) SOS: Cleared (Bad Ending) Majyūō: Cleared (Bad Ending))}
272 (2019/01/24)	ドキュメント 有野の生挑戦 in 幕張メッセ	Arino's Challenge in Makuhari Messe Documentary	N/A	N/A	N/A
273/274/275 (2019/02/07-02/21-03/07)	スーパーマリオRPG	Super Mario RPG (1996)	Super Mario RPG: Legend of the Seven Stars (1996)	Super Famicom	Cleared
276 (2019/03/21)	がんばれゴエモン2奇天烈将軍マッギネス	Ganbare Goemon 2: Kiteretsu Shogun Magginesu (1993)	N/A	Super Famicom	Cleared

23rd season

Ep #	Japanese Spelling	Romanized	Western Title	System	Cleared or Failed
277 (2019/04/14)	PAC-LAND	Pac-Land (1989)	Pac-Land (1990)	PC Engine	Cleared^{(Note: Normal run only, AD cleared it in the Pro [Ura in Japan] mode)}
278 (2019/05/09)	新・熱血硬派 くにおたちの挽歌	Shin Nekketsu Kōha: Kunio-tachi no Banka (1994)	River City Girls Zero (2022)	Super Famicom	Cleared
279 (2019/05/23)	デモンズブレイゾン 魔界村 紋章編	Demon's Blazon: Makaimura Monshō hen (1994)	Demon's Crest (1994)	Super Famicom	Cleared^{(Note: Managed to get two Bad Endings)}
280 (2019/06/06)	イメージファイト	Image Fight (1990)	Image Fight (1990)	Famicom	Cleared
281 (2019/06/20)	風のクロノア door to phantomile	Kaze no Klonoa door to phantomile (1997)	Klonoa: Door to Phantomile (1998)	PlayStation	Failed^{(Note: Promised to clear and show the ending later)}
282 (2019/07/11)	す～ぱ～忍者くん	Super Ninja-kun (1994)	Super Ninja-kid (2023)	Super Famicom	Cleared
2 Hour Special (2019/07/21)	ゲームセンターCX in Russia / ICE CLIMBER	ICE CLIMBER (1985)	Ice Climber (1985)	Famicom	Cleared
283 (2019/07/25)	アテナ	Athena (1987)	Athena (1987)	Famicom	Failed
284/285/286 (2019/08/15-9/12-10/03)	MOTHER2 ギーグの逆襲	MOTHER 2: Gīgu no Gyakushū (1994)	EarthBound (1995)	Super Famicom	Cleared^{(Note: Played through MOTHER 1+2 on Game Boy Player to grind levels outside the show; Episode 285 also contains an interview with Shigesato Itoi.)}
287 (2019/10/17)	アイラブミッキー&ドナルド ふしぎなマジックボックス	I Love Mickey & Donald: Fushigi na Magic Box (1992)	World of Illusion Starring Mickey Mouse and Donald Duck (1992)	Mega Drive Mini	Cleared
288 (2019/11/07)	超人狼戦記 WARWOLF	Chō Jinrō Senki Wōurufu (1991)	Werewolf: The Last Warrior (1990)	Famicom	Cleared
289 (2019/11/21)	ワルキューレの伝説	Valkyrie no Densetsu (1990)	The Legend of Valkyrie (2022)	PC Engine	Cleared
290 (2019/12/05)	スペースチャンネル5	Space Channel 5 (1999)	Space Channel 5 (2000)	Dreamcast	Failed
291 (2019/12/19)	迷宮寺院ダババ	Meikyū Jiin Dababa (1987)	N/A	Famicom Disk System	Cleared
292 (2020/01/16)	ラフワールド	Rafu Wārudo (1990)	Journey to Silius (1990)	Famicom	Cleared
293 (2020/02/06)	夢幻戦士ヴァリス	Mugen Senshi Varisu (1991)	Valis: The Fantasm Soldier (1991)	Mega Drive	Cleared
294 (2020/02/20)	ファンタズム	Phantasm (1992)	Avenging Spirit (1992)	Game Boy	Cleared^{(Note: Cleared with a Good Ending)}
295 (2020/03/05)	クォース	Quarth (1990)	Block Hole (1990)	Famicom	Failed
296 (2020/03/19)	ジョイメカファイト	Joy Mech Fight (1993)	Joy Mech Fight (2023)	Famicom	Cleared
GameCenter CX mini (2020/03/20)	ゲームセンターCX mini	Super Mario Bros. 3 (1988); Panel de Pon (1995); The King of Fighters '98: Dream Match Never Ends (1998); Saigo no Nindō (1990); Bomberman '94 (1993)	Super Mario Bros. 3 (1990); Panel de Pon (2020); The King of Fighters '98: The Slugfest (1998); Ninja Spirit (1990); Bomberman '94 (2009)	Famicom Mini; Super Famicom Mini; Neo Geo Mini; PC Engine mini PC Engine mini	Cleared (3/5)^{(Note: Full status: Super Mario Bros. 3: Cleared Panel de Pon: Failed The King of Fighters '98: Cleared (won against Nakayama) Ninja Spirit: Failed Bomberman '94: Cleared (everyone wins but Nakayama))}

24th season

(The season mascot changes from King to Frozen King and then to Penguin King.)

Ep #	Japanese Spelling	Romanized	Western Title	System	Cleared or Failed
297/298 (2020/04/16-05/07)	悪魔城ドラキュラX 血の輪廻	Akumajō Dracula X: Chi no Rondo (1993)	Castlevania: Rondo of Blood (2007)	Super CD-ROM^{2}	Cleared^{(Note: Cleared with the Richter ending)}
299 (2020/05/21)	THE HOUSE OF THE DEAD	THE HOUSE OF THE DEAD (1998)	The House of the Dead (1998)	Saturn	Cleared
300 (2020/06/11)	ドラゴンファイター	Dragon Fighter (1990)	Dragon Fighter (1992)	Famicom	Cleared
300th episode commemorative special (2020/06/21)	ゲームセンターCX放送300回記念生放送スペシャル	Nuts & Milk (1984); Panel de Pon (1995)	N/A; Panel de Pon (2020)	Famicom; Super Famicom	Cleared^{(Note: Cleared all 50 stages with skips, AD managed to get the ending without a single skip)} Failed
301 (2020/07/09)	大工の源さん	Daiku no Gen-san (1991)	Hammerin' Harry (1992)	Famicom	Cleared
302 (2020/07/23)	ちゃっくんぽっぷ	Chack'n Pop (1985)	Chack'n Pop (2026)	Famicom	Cleared
303 (2020/08/13)	キング・オブ・ザ・モンスターズ2	KING OF THE MONSTERS 2 (1993)	King of the Monsters 2 (1993)	Super Famicom	Cleared
304 (2020/09/17)	マッピーキッズ	Mappy Kids (1989)	Mappy Kids (2020)	Famicom	Cleared
305 (2020/10/08)	ポケモンスナップ	Pokémon Snap (1999)	Pokémon Snap (1999)	Nintendo 64	Cleared^{(Note: Good Ending with photos of 63 Pokémon taken)}
306 (2020/10/22)	XI［sái］	XI (1998)	Devil Dice (1998)	PlayStation	Cleared^{(Note: Game has no ending, all stages cleared)}
307 (2020/11/12)	サイコドリーム	Psycho Dream (1992)	Psycho Dream (2021)	Super Famicom	Cleared
308 (2020/11/26)	エスパードリーム	Esper Dream (1987)	N/A	Famicom Disk System	Cleared
309 (2020/12/10)	ニュージーランドストーリー	The NewZealand Story (1990)	The NewZealand Story	PC Engine	Cleared
310 (2020/12/24)	クイズの星	Quiz no Hoshi (1992)	N/A	Super CD-ROM^{2}	Cleared
311 (2021/01/14)	美少女戦士セーラームーン	Bishoujo Senshi Sailor Moon (1993)	Sailor Moon (1994)	Super Famicom	Cleared^{(Note: Cleared in the Normal difficulty, PR Ogawa cleared in the Hard difficulty later)}
312 (2021/01/28)	ならず者戦闘部隊ブラッディウルフ	Narazumono Sentou Butai BLOODY WOLF (1989)	Bloody Wolf (1990)	PC Engine	Cleared
313 (2021/02/11)	マッスルボマー THE BODY EXPLOSION	Muscle Bomber: THE BODY EXPLOSION (1993)	Saturday Night Slam Masters (1993)	Super Famicom	Failed^{(Note: Managed to get the Good Ending, but lost against staff)}
314 (2021/02/25)	ダイナマイトデューク	Dynamite Duke (1990)	Dynamite Duke (1990)	Mega Drive	Cleared
315 (2021/03/11)	忍者じゃじゃ丸 ～銀河大作戦～	Ninja Jajamaru: Ginga Daisakusen (1991)	Ninja JaJaMaru: Operation Milky Way (2023)	Famicom	Cleared
316 (2021/03/25)	ザ・ファイヤーメン	The Firemen (1994)	The Firemen (1995)	Super Famicom	Cleared
GameCenter KBX (2021/03/28)	ゲームセンターKBX	Return of the Obra Dinn (2019); Cave Story+ (2018)	Return of the Obra Dinn (2018); Cave Story+ (2011)	Nintendo Switch	N/A^{(Note: Aired as a simulation of Arino playing Nintendo Switch games in 2037)}

25th season

(The season mascot changes from Penguin King back to the King)

Ep #	Japanese Spelling	Romanized	Western Title	System	Cleared or Failed
317/318 (2021/04/22-05/13)	ゼルダの伝説	Zelda no Densetsu (1986)	The Legend of Zelda (1987)	Famicom Disk System	Cleared
319 (2021/05/27)	ドラゴンズレア	Dragon's Lair (1991)	Dragon's Lair (1990)	Famicom	Failed^{(Note: Played later as part of the Saitama Super Arena event, result still pending)}
320 (2021/06/24)	風雲少林拳	Fuuun Shaolin Ken (1987)	N/A	Famicom Disk System	Cleared^{(Note: First loop only, AD cleared the second loop)}
321 (2021/07/08)	ゲイングランド	Gain Ground (1991)	Gain Ground (1991)	Mega Drive	Cleared
322 (2021/07/22)	エアー・フォートレス	Air Fortress (1987)	Air Fortress (1989)	Famicom	Failed
323 (2021/08/12)	スーパーワギャンランド	Super Wagyan Land (1991)	N/A	Super Famicom	Cleared
324 (2021/09/09)	ファザナドゥ	Faxanadu (1987)	Faxanadu (1989)	Famicom	Cleared
325 (2021/10/14)	SIMPLE2000シリーズ Vol.31 THE 地球防衛軍	Simple 2000 Series Vol.31 THE Chikyū Bōeigun (2003)	Monster Attack (2003)	PlayStation 2	Cleared
326 (2021/10/28)	東京バス案内 今日から君も運転手	Tokyo Bus Annai: Kyou Kara Kimi mo Untenshu (2003)	N/A	PlayStation 2	Failed
327 (2021/11/11)	月風魔伝	Getsu Fūma Den (1987)	N/A	Famicom	Cleared
328 (2021/11/25)	ラスタンサーガII	Rastan Saga II (1990)	Rastan Saga II (1991)	Mega Drive	Cleared
329 (2021/12/09)	スーパーモンキーボール	Super Monkey Ball (2001)	Super Monkey Ball (2001)	GameCube	Cleared^{(Note: Played in the Beginner and Advanced difficulties)}
330 (2021/12/23)	アクスレイ	Axelay (1992)	Axelay (1992)	Super Famicom	Cleared
331 (2022/01/13)	スノーブラザーズ	Snow Bros. (1990)	Snow Bros. (1991)	Famicom	Cleared
332 (2022/01/27)	スペースハリアー	Space Harrier (1988)	Space Harrier (1987)	Sega Mark III & Sega Saturn	Cleared^{(Note: Sega Saturn version only, Mark III version cleared by AD)}
333 (2022/02/10)	独眼竜政宗	Dokuganryu Masamune (1988)	N/A	Famicom	Cleared
334 (2022/02/24)	おわらいよゐこのげえむ道 〜オヤジ探して3丁目〜	Owarai Yowiko no Game Michi: Oyaji Sagashite 3 Chōme (1999)	N/A	Game Boy Color	Cleared^{(Note: Managed to get 2 Bad Endings)}
335 (2022/03/10)	バットマン	Batman (1989)	Batman: The Video Game (1990)	Famicom	Cleared
GameCenter KBX 2 (2022/03/13)	ゲームセンターKBX #2	Tengoku no Tō (2009); Hoshi no Kābī Sūpā Derakkusu (1996); Bomberman (1990)	Tower of Heaven (2009); Kirby Super Star (1996); Bomberman (1991)	PC; Super Famicom; PC Engine	N/A
336 (2022/03/24)	イコ	ICO (2001)	ICO (2001)	PlayStation 2	Cleared

26th season

Ep #	Japanese Spelling	Romanized	Western Title	System	Cleared or Failed
337/338 (2022/04/28-05/12)	ロックマン5 ブルースの罠！？	Rockman 5: Blues no Wana!? (1992)	Mega Man 5 (1992)	Famicom	Cleared
339 (2022/05/26)	レッド・アラート	Red Alert (1989)	Last Alert (1990)	PC Engine	Cleared
340 (2022/06/23)	アルマナの奇跡	Arumana no Kiseki (1987)	N/A	Famicom Disk System	Failed
341 (2022/07/14)	クルードバスター	Crude Buster (1990)	Two Crude Dudes (1990)	Mega Drive	Cleared
342 (2022/07/28)	クロックタワーゴーストヘッド	Clock Tower: Ghost Head (1998)	Clock Tower II: The Struggle Within (1999)	PlayStation	Cleared
343 (2022/08/11)	エイリアンストーム	Alien Storm (1991)	Alien Storm (1990)	Mega Drive	Cleared
344 (2022/09/08)	スチームギア★マッシュ	SteamGear Mash (1995)	N/A	Sega Saturn	Cleared
345 (2022/09/22)	ティーンエージ ミュータント ニンジャ タートルズ	TEENAGE MUTANT NINJA TURTLES (1990)	Teenage Mutant Ninja Turtles II: The Arcade Game (1990)	Famicom	Cleared
346 (2022/10/13)	まじかる☆タルるートくん	Magical Taruruto-kun (1992)	N/A	Mega Drive	Cleared
347 (2022/10/27)	ニューヨーク・ニャンキーズ	N.Y. Nyankies (1991)	Rockin' Kats (1991)	Famicom	Cleared
348 (2022/11/10)	ポートピア連続殺人事件	Portopia Renzoku Satsujin Jiken (1985)	N/A	Famicom	Cleared
349 (2022/11/24)	キャプテンシルバー	Captain Silver (1988)	Captain Silver (1989)	Sega Mark III	Failed
350 (2022/12/08)	Dance Dance Revolution with MARIO	Dance Dance Revolution with MARIO (2005)	Dance Dance Revolution: Mario Mix (2005)	GameCube	Cleared^{(Note: Cleared the Story Mode, lost against staff)}
351 (2022/12/22)	グレムリン2 新種誕生	Gremlins 2: Shinshu Tanjou (1990)	Gremlins 2: The New Batch (1990)	Famicom	Cleared
352 (2023/01/26)	ナイトトラップ	Night Trap (1993)	Night Trap (1993)	Mega CD	Cleared^{(Note: Cleared with a Good Ending)}
353 (2023/02/09)	ホーリー・ダイヴァー	Holy Diver (1989)	Holy Diver (2018)	Famicom	Failed
354 (2023/02/23)	サムライスピリッツ	Samurai Spirits (1993)	Samurai Shodown (1993)	Neo Geo	Failed
355 (2023/03/09)	スーパーパン	Super Pang (1992)	Super Buster Bros. (1992)	Super Famicom	Cleared^{(Note: Cleared on Tour Mode only, AD managed to get the Ending on Panic Mode)}
356 (2023/03/23)	ウィッツ	Wit's (1990)	N/A	Famicom	Cleared

27th season

Ep #	Japanese Spelling	Romanized	Western Title	System	Cleared or Failed
357/358 (2023/04/27-5/11)	聖剣伝説 〜ファイナルファンタジー外伝〜	Seiken Densetsu 〜Final Fantasy Gaiden〜 (1991)	Final Fantasy Adventure (1991)	Game Boy	Cleared
359 (2023/05/25)	イチダントアール	Puzzle & Action: Ichidant-R (1995)	N/A	Mega Drive	Failed^{(Note: Cleared later as part of an online broadcast through the show's official YouTube channel)}
360 (2023/06/22)	魂斗羅スピリッツ	Contra Spirits (1992)	Contra III: The Alien Wars (1992)	Super Famicom	Failed
361 (2023/07/13)	サンドラの大冒険 ワルキューレとの出逢い	Sandora no Daibōken: Valkyrie to no Deai (1992)	Whirlo (1992)	Super Famicom	Failed
362 (2023/07/27)	マリオカート64	Mario Kart 64 (1996)	Mario Kart 64 (1997)	Nintendo 64	Cleared
363 (2023/08/10)	零 〜zero〜	Rei ~zero~ (2001)	Fatal Frame (2002)	PlayStation 2	Failed
364 (2023/09/07)	つっぱり大相撲	Tsuppari Ōzumō (1987)	N/A	Famicom	Cleared
365 (2023/09/28)	SIMPLE1500シリーズ Vol.56 THE スナイパー; SIMPLE2000シリーズ Vol.16 THE スナイパー2 ～悪魔の銃弾～	Simple 1500 Series Vol. 56: The Sniper (2001); Simple 2000 Series Vol. 16: The Sniper 2 ~Akuma no Juudan~ (2002)	N/A The Sniper 2 (2004)	PlayStation; PlayStation 2	Cleared^{(Note: Both games were Cleared)}
366 (2023/10/12)	ドラゴンスクロール 甦りし魔竜	Dragon Scroll: Yomigaerishi Maryuu (1987)	N/A	Famicom	Cleared
367 (2023/10/26)	サンバDEアミーゴ Ver.2000	Samba DE Amigo Ver. 2000 (2000)	N/A	Dreamcast	Failed
368 (2023/11/09)	ベア・ナックルII 死闘への鎮魂歌	Bare Knuckle II: Shitō he no Rekuiemu (1993)	Streets of Rage 2 (1992)	Mega Drive	Cleared
369 (2023/11/23)	メイド イン ワリオ あつまれ!!メイド イン ワリオ	Made in Wario (2003); Atsumare!! Made in Wario (2003)	WarioWare, Inc.: Mega Microgames! (2003); WarioWare, Inc.: Mega Party Games! (2004)	Game Boy Advance; GameCube	Cleared; Cleared^{(Note: Won against Staff)}
370 (2023/12/07)	モアイくん	Moai-kun (1990)	N/A	Famicom	Cleared
371 (2023/12/21)	熱血！すとりーとバスケット がんばれ DUNK HEROES	Nekketsu! Street Basket: Ganbare Dunk Heroes (1993)	Nekketsu! Street Basketball: All-Out Dunk Heroes (2020)	Famicom	Cleared
Arino's Challenge in Saitama Super Arena (2023/12/31)	有野の挑戦 in さいたまスーパーアリーナ 20周年大感謝祭	Punch-Out!! (1987); Super Mario Bros. 3 (1988); Rockman 2: Dr. Wily no Nazo (1988); Tokyo Bus Annai: Kyou Kara Kimi mo Untenshu (2001); Contra Spirits (1992); Captain Tsubasa (1988); Dragon's Lair (1991)	N/A; Super Mario Bros. 3 (1990); Mega Man 2 (1989); N/A; Contra III: The Alien Wars (1992); Tecmo Cup Soccer Game (1992); Dragon's Lair (1990)	Famicom; Nintendo Switch (FC NSO); Nintendo Switch (MMLC); PlayStation 2 Nintendo Switch (CAC); Famicom; Famicom	Cleared (5/7)^{(Note: Full status: Punch-Out!!: Cleared (Soda Popinski defeated) Super Mario Bros. 3: Cleared (World 8-Airship level cleared) Mega Man 2: Cleared (passed through all Quick Man Stage's Force Beams without help) Tokyo Bus Annai: Cleared (Ome course at night-time) Contra III: Cleared (Final Boss defeated) Captain Tsubasa: Failed (did not win with a weaker team against Touhou Academy) Dragon's Lair: Failed (did not defeat Singe) Additionally, Star Force (1985) was also featured as "Opening Act", but was played (and Cleared) by former AD Toujima instead.)}
372 (2024/01/25)	さいたまスーパーアリーナドキュメント	Saitama Super Arena Documentary	N/A	N/A	N/A
373 (2024/02/08)	ニンジャウォーリアーズ	Ninja Warriors (1993)	The Ninja Warriors (2022)	Mega-CD	Cleared
374 (2024/02/22)	北斗の拳	Hokuto no Ken (1986)	Black Belt (1986)	Sega Mark III	Failed
375 (2024/03/14)	妖怪倶楽部	Yōkai Club (1987)	Yokai Club (2024)	Famicom	Cleared^{(Note: Also won one quick match of Moero!! Pro Yakyū (1987) against AD Yaegashi as a break in the challenge)}
376 (2024/03/28)	スーパーパンチアウト！！	Super Punch-Out!! (1998)	Super Punch-Out!! (1994)	Super Famicom	Failed^{(Note: Failed on winning a match against Mr. Sandman, completing less than a half of the game)}

28th season

Ep #	Japanese Spelling	Romanized	Western Title	System	Cleared or Failed
377/378 (2024/04/25-05/09)	ドラゴンクエストII 悪霊の神々	Dragon Quest II: Akuryō no Kamigami (1987)	Dragon Warrior II (1990)	Famicom	Cleared
379 (2024/05/23)	ダウンタウン熱血行進曲 それゆけ大運動会	Downtown Nekketsu Kōshinkyoku: Soreyuke Daiundōkai (1990)	Downtown Nekketsu March: Super-Awesome Field Day! (2020)	Famicom	Cleared^{(Note: Lost staff battle against former AD Tsuruoka)}
380 (2024/06/20)	定吉七番秀吉の黄金	Sadakichi Seven: Hideyoshi no Ōgon (1988)	N/A	PC Engine	Cleared
381 (2024/07/11)	バーチャコップ	Virtua Cop (1995)	Virtua Cop (1995)	Sega Saturn	Cleared
382 (2024/07/25)	ミスタードリラーグレート	Mr. Driller Great (2001)	N/A	PlayStation	Failed
383 (2024/08/22)	スペースチャンネル5 パート2	Space Channel 5 Part 2 (2002)	Space Channel 5: Part 2 (2002)	Dreamcast	Failed
384 (2024/09/12)	スプラッターハウス わんぱくグラフィティ	Splatterhouse: Wanpaku Graffiti (1989)	Splatterhouse: Wanpaku Graffiti (2020)	Famicom	Cleared
385 (2024/09/26)	弟切草	Otogirisō (1992)	N/A	Super Famicom	Cleared
386 (2024/10/10)	ラッシング・ビート乱 複製都市	Rushing Beat Ran: Fukusei Toshi (1992)	Brawl Brothers (1993)	Super Famicom	Cleared
387 (2024/10/24)	ARMORED CORE	Armored Core (1997)	Armored Core (1997)	PlayStation	Failed
388 (2024/11/14)	スペランカーII勇者への挑戦	Spelunker II: Yūja e no Chōsen (1987)	N/A	Famicom	Cleared
389 (2024/11/28)	サバイバルキッズ 孤島の冒険者	Survival Kids: Kotō no Bōkensha (1999)	Survival Kids (1999)	Game Boy Color	Cleared^{(Note: Managed to get a Bad Ending, Good Ending was managed by the AD)}
390 (2024/12/12)	マジック・ジョン	Magic John (1990)	Totally Rad (1991)	Famicom	Cleared
391 (2024/12/26)	伝説のスタフィー	Densetsu no Starfy (2002)	Densetsu no Starfy 1 (2024)	Game Boy Advance	Failed
392 (2025/01/23)	ときめきメモリアル Girl's Side	Tokimeki Memorial Girl's Side (2002)	N/A	PlayStation 2	Failed^{(Note: Six stats parameters had to reach specific values. Four of them had to reach over 150 (Academic, Art, Exercise, Popularity ability), the last two had to reach over 100 (Attentiveness and Charm ability). Only one stat parameter reached over 150, which resulted in a Bad Ending. Good Ending was managed by the AD.)}
393 (2025/02/13)	ブラストドーザー	Blastdozer (1997)	Blast Corps (1997)	Nintendo 64	Failed
394 (2025/02/27)	反省ザルジローくんの大冒険	Hansei Zaru: Jirō-kun no Daibōken (1991)	Spanky's Quest (1992)	Super Famicom	Cleared
395/396 (2025/03/13-03/27)	悪魔城ドラキュラ	Akumajō Dracula (1991)	Super Castlevania IV (1991)	Super Famicom	Cleared
400 minutes live Preparation Special (2025/03/31)	400分生放送！大予習SP	N/A	N/A	N/A	N/A

29th season

Ep #	Japanese Spelling	Romanized	Western Title	System	Cleared or Failed
397 (2025/04/24)	炎の闘球児 ドッジ弾平	Honō no Tōkyūji: Dodge Danpei (1992)	N/A	Super Famicom	Cleared
398/399 (2025/05/08-05/22)	新・忍伝	Shin Shinobi Den (1995)	Shinobi Legions (1995)	Sega Saturn	Cleared
400 minutes live special (2025/06/13)	放送400回記念 400分生放送	Punch-Out!! (1987)	N/A	Famicom	Failed^{(Note: Defeated Mr. Sandman; ran out of time to challenge Super Macho Man.)}
400 (2025/06/19)	愛戦士ニコル	Ai Senshi Nicol (1987)	N/A	Famicom Disk System	Cleared
401 (2025/07/10)	亀の恩返し ウラシマ伝説	Kame no Ongaeshi: Urashima Densetsu (1988)	Xexyz (1990)	Famicom	Failed^{(Note: Cleared later in Episode 407, managed to get the Best Ending)}
402 (2025/07/24)	ECHO NIGHT	Echo Night (1998)	Echo Night (1999)	PlayStation	Cleared
403 (2025/08/21)	ピカチュウげんきでちゅう	Pikachū Genki Dechū (1998)	Hey You, Pikachu! (2000)	Nintendo 64	Cleared^{(Note: Arino cleared the game in 7 hours.)}
404 (2025/09/11)	サムライキッド	Samurai Kid (2001)	N/A	Game Boy Color	Cleared
405 (2025/09/25)	デカスリート	DecAthlete (1996)	DecAthlete (1996)	Sega Saturn	Cleared^{(Note: Arino cleared the game in 10 hours. With the remaining time, staff hosted a tournament to compete against Arino. Although 5 staff members were prepared for the competition, Arino was allowed to win with just two wins (perhaps due to time limit). The final results was 2 wins and 1 loss.)}
406 (2025/10/09)	闘神伝	Tōshinden (1995)	Battle Arena Toshinden (video game) (1995)	PlayStation	Cleared^{(Note: Lost a quick battle against the Director)}
407 (2025/10/23)	ワードナの森	Wardner no Mori (1988)	Wardner (2026)	Famicom Disk System	Cleared^{(Note: Cleared in 1 hour and 55 minutes; the rest of the day was used to get a revenge against Xexyz (1990), of which was Cleared (managed to get the Best Ending))}
408 (2025/11/13)	ザ・ロード・オブ・キング	The Lord of King (1989)	Astyanax (1990)	Famicom	Cleared^{(Note: Cleared in 8 hours)}
409/410 (2025/11/27-12/11)	キャプテン翼III 皇帝の挑戦	Captain Tsubasa III: Kōtei no Chōsen (1992)	N/A	Super Famicom	Failed
411 (2025/12/25)	クロックワーク ナイト ～ ペパルーチョの大冒険・上巻～ クロックワーク ナイト ～ ペパルーチョの大冒険・下巻～	Clockwork Knight: Pepperouchau no Daibōken Jōkan (1994); Clockwork Knight: Pepperouchau no Daibōken Gekan (1995)	Clockwork Knight (1995); Clockwork Knight 2 (1995)	Sega Saturn	Cleared
Kyushu Tamage Special (2025/12/28)	たまに行くなら九州弾丸ツアー ピクミン	Pikmin (2001)	Pikmin (2001)	GameCube	TBA^{(Note: Available to watch exclusively on FOD (Fuji On Demand))}
412 (2026/01/22)	ドラゴンニンジャ	Dragonninja (1989)	Bad Dudes (1989)	Famicom	Cleared
413 (2026/02/12)	探偵神宮寺三郎 危険な二人	Tantei Jingūji Saburō: Kiken na Futari (1988/1989)	N/A	Famicom Disk System	Cleared
414 (2026/02/26)	パワー・ブレイザー	Power Blazer (1990)	Power Blade (1991)	Famicom	Cleared^{(Note: Cleared in 9 hours)}
415 (2026/03/12)	ことばのパズル もじぴったん	Kotoba no Puzzle: Mojipittan (2003)	N/A	PlayStation 2	Failed^{(Note: Cleared the game, but failed a Vs. match against the staff (1-2))}
416 (2026/03/26)	怒首領蜂	DoDonPachi (1997)	N/A	Sega Saturn	Cleared^{(Note: Played for a total of 7 hours and 30 minutes. After an attempt at trying to get an ending through the Arcade Mode without any good results, Saturn Mode was instead chosen for the challenge, which allowed Arino to give himself more credits through a hidden button combination. The Staff allowed him at least 9+1 credits to be used initially. To gain the approval for more credits from the staff than the initial credits, Arino had to beat various real life reflex challenges to earn more credits. Eventually he was able to beat one of these reflex challenges. Afterwards, Arino was finally able to Clear the 6 Stages and the Last Boss Hibachi to acquire the Good Ending. Throughout the majority of the episode, Arino was playing the game in Horizontal (NORMAL/YOKO) Screen mode, but near the end the TV was adjusted to Vertical (TATE) screen mode, which made it slightly easier for Arino to overcome and avoid the bullets on the screen.)}

30th Season

(The season mascot changes from King to Baby King)

Ep #	Japanese Spelling	Romanized	Western Title	System	Cleared or Failed
417/418 (2026/04/23-05/07)	クラッシュ・バンディクー	Crash Bandicoot (1996)	Crash Bandicoot (1996)	PlayStation	Cleared^{(Note: Arino got 100%, including collecting all the gems, and earned the True Ending.)}
419 (2026/05/21)	ジュエル・マスター	Jewel Master (1991)	Jewel Master (1991)	Mega Drive	Cleared^{(Note: Arino finished it in 9 hours.)}
420 (2026/06/04)	ロケットナイトアドベンチャーズ	Rocket Knight Adventures (1993)	Rocket Knight Adventures (1993)	Mega Drive	Cleared^{(Note: Arino finished it in 11 hours.)}
Revenge at Hotel; Sun Hatoya Special (2026/06/25)	有野課長vsスーパーマリオブラザーズ3 サンハトヤ完全決着SP	Super Mario Bros. 3 (1988)	Super Mario Bros. 3 (1990)	Famicom	Cleared^{(Note: Revenge from Episode 10; cleared by playing from World 8 on the same hotel room.)}
421 (2026/07/09)	OverBlood	OverBlood (1996)	OverBlood (1997)	PlayStation	Cleared^{(Note: Arino finished it in 10 hours.)}
422 (2026/07/23)	鉄腕アトム	Tetsuwan Atom (1988)	N/A	Famicom	Cleared^{(Note: The final escape was handled by AD who was cosplaying as the professor from the Astro Boy franchise, however it is still considered as a Clear in Arino's favor. The game was cleared in 13 hours.)}
423 (2026/08/20)	リズム天国	Rhythm Tengoku (2006)	N/A	Game Boy Advance	Failed^{(Note: The last Remixes were considered too "High Level" for Arino to Clear, and time for the Challenge was running out, so the Staff judged it as a Fail in the end.)}
424/425 (2026/09/10-09/24)	スターフォックス６４	Star Fox 64 (1997)	Star Fox 64 (1997)	Nintendo 64	Cleared^{(Note: Arino finished the challenge with a total time of 15 hours. Normal Ending was Cleared in Part 1, and True Ending was Cleared in Part 2. The True Ending Route was Corneria > Sector Y > Aquas > Zoness > Macbeth > Area 6 > Venom 2)}
426 (2026/10/08)	鋼 HAGANE	Hagane (1994)	Hagane: The Final Conflict (1995)	Super Famicom	Cleared^{(Note: Arino cleared it at 13 hours and 30 minutes. With Arino's last attempt, he was able to collect and farm 8 Bombs to carry towards the Final Mission of the game, and made easy work of the last section of said mission.)}
427 (2026/10/22)	時空勇伝デビアス	Jikū Yūden Debias (1987)	N/A	Famicom	Cleared^{(Note: Arino cleared it in 5 hours and 30 minutes, and staff declared it a Clear. However, Arino got the Bad End, so AD had to acquire the Good End afterwards.)}
428 (2026/11/05)	パジャマヒーロー ＮＥＭＯ	Pajama Hero NEMO (1990)	Little Nemo: The Dream Master (1990)	Famicom	Cleared^{(Note: Arino cleared it in 13 hours and 30 minutes.)}
429 (2026/11/19)	メタルスラッグ	Metal Slug (1997)	N/A	Sega Saturn	Cleared^{(Note: Despite having limited credits and restarting many times, Arino cleared it in 3 hours and 30 minutes.)}
Sega Universe Special (2026/12/30)	セガガガ	Segagaga (2001)	N/A	Dreamcast	TBA^{(Note: Aired as a celebration of Sky PerfecTV's 30th anniversary)}

=== DVD-Exclusive Challenges ===
Each DVD-Box set released includes a game challenge exclusive to the DVD set. Most of these challenges were Famicom games.

DVD #	Japanese Spelling	Romanized	Western Title	System	Cleared or Failed
1 (2005/12/23)	戦え! 超ロボット生命体トランスフォーマー コンボイの謎	The Transformers: Mystery of Convoy (1987)	N/A	Famicom	Failed
2 (2006/06/23)	いっき	Ikki (1986)	N/A	Famicom	Failed^{(Note: Game has no actual ending, Arino managed to get the 8 hidden letters, ADs were forced to draw an ending)}
3 (2006/12/22)	ツインビー	TwinBee (1986)	N/A	Famicom	Failed
4 (2007/12/21)	ボンバーマン	Bomberman (1986); Bomberman (1990)	Bomberman (1989); Bomberman (1991)	Famicom; PC Engine	Cleared; Cleared^{(Note: Won against Staff in Battle Mode)}
5 (2008/12/21)	ドルアーガの塔	The Tower of Druaga (1985)	The Tower of Druaga (2020)	Famicom	Cleared
Arino's Challenge 2 Special DVD (2009/02/26)	ゲームセンターCX 有野の挑戦状	GameCenter CX: Arino no Chōsenjō (2008)	Retro Game Challenge (2009)	Nintendo DS	Cleared^{(Note: 8 out of 9 objectives, failed at Robot Ninja Haggleman 2)}
6 (2009/12/18)	イー・アル・カンフー	Yie Ar Kung Fu (1985)	Yie Ar Kung-Fu (1986)	Famicom	Cleared^{(Note: Revenge challenge)}
6 (2009/12/18)	がんばれゴエモン〜ゆき姫救出絵巻〜	Ganbare Goemon: Yukihime Kyuushutsu Emaki (1991)	The Legend of the Mystical Ninja (1992)	Super Famicom	Cleared
7 (2010/12/24)	バイナリィランド	Binary Land (1986)	N/A	Famicom	Cleared^{(Note: Game has no actual ending, all stages cleared, Arino drew one)}
8 (2011/12/22)	シティコネクション	City Connection (1985)	City Connection (1988)	Famicom	Cleared
8 (2011/12/22)	源平討魔伝	Genpei Tōma Den (1990)	N/A	PC Engine	Cleared
GameCenter CX in U.S.A. (2012/08/31)	ダイナマイト刑事	Dynamite Deka (1997)	Die Hard Arcade (1997)	Sega Saturn	Cleared
9 (2012/12/21)	スペランカー	Spelunker (1986)	N/A	Famicom	Cleared
10 (2013/12/20)	プーヤン	Pooyan (1985)	N/A	Famicom	Cleared
3-chōme no Arino Special (2014/03/20)	ゲームセンターCX 有野の挑戦状2 ゲームセンターCX 3丁目の有野	GameCenter CX: Arino no Chōsenjō 2 (2009); GameCenter CX: 3-chōme no Arino (2014)	N/A; N/A	Nintendo DS; Nintendo 3DS	Cleared^{(Note: 2 out of 3 objectives, got a Bad Ending on Mutekiken Kung-Fu)} Cleared^{(Note: Placed in 2nd place on a Staff Battle in Breakshoot)}
GameCenter CX the Movie (2014/09/02)	ボンジャック	Bomb Jack (1984)	Bomb Jack (1984)	Wii (Virtual Console Arcade)	Failed
11 (2014/12/19)	悪魔城ドラキュラ	Akumajō Dracula (1986)	Castlevania (1987)	Famicom	Cleared
12 (2015/12/18)	バイオハザード ディレクターズカット	Biohazard: Director's Cut (1997)	Resident Evil: Director's Cut (1997)	PlayStation	Cleared
Mega Drive Special (2016/09/02)	ソニック・ザ・ヘッジホッグ2	Sonic the Hedgehog 2 (1993)	Sonic the Hedgehog 2 (1993)	Mega Drive	Cleared^{(Note: Cleared without any Chaos Emeralds)}
13 (2016/12/16)	がんばれゴエモン2	Ganbare Goemon 2 (1989)	N/A	Famicom	Cleared
PC Engine Special (2017/08/02)	高橋名人の新冒険島	Takahashi Meijin no Shin Bōken Jima (1992)	New Adventure Island (1992)	PC Engine	Cleared
14 (2017/12/22)	熱血高校ドッジボール部 PC番外編	Nekketsu Kōkō Dodge Ball Bu: PC Bangai Hen (1990)	Super Dodge Ball	PC Engine	Cleared
Best Selection Blu-Ray (2018/08/02)	アトランチスの謎 魔界村	Atlantis no Nazo (1986); Makaimura (1986)	N/A; Ghosts 'n Goblins (1986)	Famicom Mini	Failed^{(Note: 0 out of 3 objectives)} Cleared^{(Note: 1 out of 3 objectives)}
15 (2018/12/21)	バイオハザード2	Biohazard 2 (1998)	Resident Evil 2 (1998)	PlayStation	Cleared
16 (2019/12/20)	ときめきメモリアル2	Tokimeki Memorial 2 (1999)	N/A	PlayStation	Cleared
17 (2020/12/18)	逆転裁判	Gyakuten Saiban (2001)	Phoenix Wright: Ace Attorney	Game Boy Advance	Cleared
18 (2021/12/17)	桃太郎電鉄V	Momotaro Dentetsu V (1999)	N/A	PlayStation	Failed^{(Note: Lost against Staff)}
19 (2022/12/16)	メタルギアソリッド	METAL GEAR SOLID (1998)	Metal Gear Solid (1998)	PlayStation	Cleared
20 (2023/12/15)	バイオハザード3 ラスト エスケープ	Biohazard 3 LAST ESCAPE (1999)	Resident Evil 3: Nemesis (1999)	PlayStation	Cleared^{(Note: Cleared with an E rank (over 10 hours, more than 30 saves))}
Arino no Chōsenjō 1+2 REPLAY Bandai Namco Special (2024/02/22)	キン肉マン キン肉星王位争奪戦	Kinnikuman: Kinnikusei Ōi Sōdatsusen (1987)	N/A	Famicom Disk System	Failed
GameCenter CX Official Bootleg Version (2024/10/11)	SkateCat	SkateCat (2022)	SkateCat (2022)	Famicom	Cleared^{(Note: Aftermarket game, not licensed by Nintendo)}
21 (2024/12/13)	スターソルジャー	Star Soldier (1986)	Star Soldier (1989)	Famicom	Cleared^{(Note: Due to a difficult continue system, the Nintendo Switch Online re-release was used for most of the challenge)}
22 (2025/12/12)	モンスターハンター	Monster Hunter (2004)	Monster Hunter (2004)	PlayStation 2	TBA
23 (2026/12/11)	ロックマンエグゼ	Rockman EXE (2001)	Mega Man Battle Network (2001)	Game Boy Advance	TBA

=== Nintendo eShop-exclusive specials Challenges ===
These challenges became officially inaccessible by the closure of Minna no Nintendo Channel on June 28, 2013 for Wii and on March 28, 2023, by the closure of Nintendo eShop for 3DS and Wii U.

Ep #	Japanese Spelling	Romanized	Western Title	System	Cleared or Failed
1 (2008/09/24-10/01)	ロックマン9 野望の復活!!	Rockman 9: Yabou no Fukkatsu!! (2008)	Mega Man 9 (2008)	Wii	N/A
2 (2009/04/8)	妖怪道中記 忍者じゃじゃ丸くん ザ・スーパー忍 改造町人シュビビンマン アレックスキッドのミラクルワールド ゴールデンアックス すーぱーぐっすんおよよ	Yokai Dochuki (1988); Ninja JaJaMaru-kun (1985); The Super Shinobi (1993); Kaizou Choujin Shubibinman (1989); Alex Kidd no Miracle World (1987); Golden Axe (1990); Super Gussun Oyoyo (1995)	N/A; Ninja JaJaMaru-kun (2021); The Revenge of Shinobi (1993); Cyber Citizen Shockman (2023); Alex Kidd in Miracle World (1987); Golden Axe (1990); N/A	Wii(Virtual Console)	N/A
3 (2009/04/15)	スターフォース	Star Force (1985)	Star Force (1987)	Wii(Virtual Console)	Cleared
4 (2009/05/14)	ダウンタウンスペシャル くにおくんの時代劇だよ全員集合!	Downtown Special: Kunio-kun no Jidaigeki da yo Zen'in Shūgō! (1991)	Downtown Special: Kunio-kun's Historical Period Drama! (2020)	Wii(Virtual Console)	Failed
5 (2009/06/17)	スプラッターハウス	Splatterhouse (1988)	Splatterhouse (1989)	Wii(Virtual Console)	Cleared
6 (2009/07/01)	VOLFIED	Volfied (1989)	Volfied	Wii(Virtual Console)	Cleared
7 (2009/07/22)	スーパーマリオカート	Super Mario Kart (1992)	Super Mario Kart (1992)	Wii(Virtual Console)	Failed
8/9/10 (2009/11/11-11/25-12/02)	スーパーマリオブラザーズ3	Super Mario Bros. 3 (1988)	Super Mario Bros. 3 (1990)	Wii(Virtual Console)	Cleared
11/12/13 (2010/04/28-05/06-05/12)	スーパーメトロイド	Super Metroid (1994)	Super Metroid (1994)	Wii(Virtual Console)	Cleared
14 (2010/07/07)	ファイアーエムブレム 紋章の謎	Fire Emblem: Monshō no Nazo (1994)	Fire Emblem: Mystery of the Emblem	Wii(Virtual Console)	Cleared
15 (2011/06/07)	3Dクラシックス エキサイトバイク	3D Classics: Excitebike (2011)	3D Classics: Excitebike (2011)	Nintendo 3DS	Cleared
15 (2011/06/15)	3Dクラシックス ゼビウス	3D Classics: Xevious (2011)	3D Classics: Xevious (2011)	Nintendo 3DS	Failed
17 (2011/07/06)	スターフォックス64	Star Fox 64 (1997)	Star Fox 64 (1997)	Wii(Virtual Console)	Cleared
18 (2012/02/22)	星のカービィ メタファイトEX クイックス ゼルダの伝説 おいらじゃじゃ丸!世界大冒険ド; PITMAN ドンキーコング（ゲームボーイ版）	Hoshi no Kirby (1992); Metafight EX (2000); QIX (1990); Zelda no Densetsu 1 (1991); Oira Jajamaru! Sekai Daibōken (1990); PITMAN (1990); Donkey Kong (1994)	Kirby's Dream Land (1992); Blaster Master: Enemy Below (2000); Qix (1990); The Legend of Zelda (1987); Maru's Mission (1991); Catrap (1990); Donkey Kong (1994)	Nintendo 3DS(Virtual Console)	N/A
SP (2012/10/26)	バルーンファイト	Balloon Fight (1985)	Balloon Fight (1986)	Wii(Virtual Console)	Failed
19 (2012/06/22)	星のカービィ スーパーデラックス	Hoshi no Kirby: Super Deluxe (1996)	Kirby Super Star (1996)	Wii(Kirby's Dream Collection: Special Edition)	Cleared
20 (2013/01/24)	バルーンファイト	Balloon Fight (1985)	Balloon Fight (1986)	Wii U(Virtual Console)	Cleared
21/22 (2013/02/20)	ファイアーエムブレム 紋章の謎	Fire Emblem: Monshō no Nazo (1994)	Fire Emblem: Mystery of the Emblem	Wii U(Virtual Console)	Cleared
23 (2013/03/20)	MOTHER2 ギーグの逆襲	MOTHER 2 (1994)	EarthBound (1995)	Wii U(Virtual Console)	Cleared
24 (2013/07/18)	ロックマン2 Dr.ワイリーの謎	Rockman 2: Dr. Wily no Nazo (1988)	Mega Man 2 (1989)	Wii U(Virtual Console)	Cleared
25 (2013/12/18)	ファミコンリミックス	Famicom Remix (2013)	NES Remix (2013)	Wii U	N/A
26 (2014/04/15-04/22)	ファミコンリミックス1+2	Famicom Remix 1+2 (2014)	NES Remix Pack (2014)	Wii U	Cleared
27 (2015/05/16-05/17-09/30)	スーパーマリオメーカー	Super Mario Maker (2015)	Super Mario Maker (2015)	Wii U	Cleared
27 (2015/05/16-05/17-09/30)	スーパーマリオブラザーズ	Super Mario Bros. (1985)	Super Mario Bros. (1985)	Wii(Virtual Console)	Cleared with help
28/29/30/31/32 (2016/05/24-06/23-08/08-10/04-11/11)	ポケットモンスター 赤・緑	Pocket Monsters: Aka/Midori (1996)	Pokémon Red Version and Blue Version (1998)	Nintendo 3DS(Virtual Console)	Cleared

=== YouTube channel content ===
The channel was opened as a celebration of the show's 20th anniversary in November 2022. Some episodes include their BGM swapped compared to their original TV airings or even the DVD versions.

Date(s)	Japanese Title	Romanized Title	Description
2022/11/04	【祝・20周年突入】YouTubeチャンネル始動！	[20th Anniversary Celebration] YouTube channel's launch!	Channel's debut report and goods update.
2022/11/08; 2022/11/11; 2022/11/15; 2022/11/18; 2022/11/22; 2022/11/25; 2022/11/29; 2022/12/02	有野の挑戦『スーパーマリオワールド』	Arino's Challenge: Super Mario World (1990)	Split into 8 parts
2022/11/18	【祝・50万人突破】休憩中の課長から皆さんへ	[500K Subscribers Celebration] From the Kacho to everyone during a lunch	Report of the channel surpassing the 500,000 subscriber mark
2022/11/24; 2023/01/31; 2023/02/03	おっさん3人思い出を語ろう	Talk show about past memories from three old men	Three-part talk show with Arino, Director Fujimoto, and Cameraman Abe. Each one shares their thoughts on the early moments of the show, the GameCenter CX as a company, Arino's work suit, and the ADs.
2022/12/06; 2023/12/09; 2023/12/13; 2023/12/16	有野の挑戦『アトランチスの謎』	Arino's Challenge: Atlantis no Nazo (1986)	Split into 4 parts
2023/01/06; 2023/01/10; 2023/01/13; 2023/01/17	有野の挑戦『忍者龍剣伝』	Arino's Challenge: Ninja Gaiden (1989)	Split into 4 parts
2023/01/24	【お知らせ】プレミア公開について	[Notice] About Premiere releases	Arino's report in Premiere releases on YouTube, as well as the delivery of YouTube's silver mark board.
2023/01/27	有野の挑戦『魔界村』	Arino's Challenge: Ghosts 'n Goblins (1986)	N/A
2023/02/07; 2023/02/10; 2023/02/14; 2023/02/17	有野の挑戦『セプテントリオン』	Arino's Challenge: SOS (1993)	Split into 4 parts
2023/02/24	有野の挑戦『ゼルダの伝説 神々のトライフォース』	Arino's Challenge: The Legend of Zelda: A Link to the Past (1992)	N/A
2023/03/03; 2023/03/04; 2023/03/10	GCCX×クリカノ	GameCenter CX × CritiKano	Three-part collab with Arino and Writer Kibe versus Eiko Kano's CritiKano Hit channel, playing Bushido Blade (1997), Dragon Quest III (1996), and Final Fantasy VII (1997) plus Final Fantasy IX (2000) minigames.
2023/03/17	有野の挑戦『クロックタワー』	Arino's Challenge: Clock Tower (1995)	N/A
2023/03/28	有野の挑戦『たけしの挑戦状』	Arino's Challenge: Takeshi no Chousenjou (1986)	N/A
2023/03/31; 2023/04/04; 2023/04/07; 2023/04/11	有野の挑戦『ワギャンランド』	Arino's Challenge: Wagan Land (1989)	Split into 4 parts
2023/04/14; 2023/04/18; 2023/04/21; 2023/04/25; 2023/07/11	有野の挑戦『ロックマン2 Dr.ワイリーの謎』	Arino's Challenge: Mega Man 2 (1988)	Split into 4 parts Re-released later in full duration as a warm-up for the Saitama Super Arena live event
2023/05/02	有野の挑戦『パンチアウト!!』	Arino's Challenge: Punch-Out!! (1987)	Released as a warm-up for the Saitama Super Arena live event
2023/05/12	有野の挑戦『高橋名人の冒険島』	Arino's Challenge: Adventure Island (1986)	N/A
2023/05/19; 2023/05/23; 2023/05/26	GCCX×サロメ	GameCenter CX × Salome	Three-part collab with Nijisanji's Hyakumantenbara Salome, featuring Ninja Gaiden (1989), Ice Climber (1985) and Ghosts 'n Goblins (1986). Additional three episodes can be found on Salome's channel featuring Resident Evil 7 (2017) and Nintendo 64 - Nintendo Switch Online (2021).
2023/05/30	有野の挑戦『スーパーマリオブラザーズ3』	Arino's Challenge: Super Mario Bros. 3 (1988)	Released as a warm-up for the Saitama Super Arena live event
2023/06/02; 2023/06/06; 2023/06/09; 2023/06/13	有野の挑戦『クイズ 殿様の野望』	Arino's Challenge: Quiz Tonosama no Yabou (1993)	Split into 4 parts
2023/06/20	有野の挑戦『星のカービィ 夢の泉の物語』	Arino's Challenge: Kirby's Adventure (1993)	N/A
2023/06/23; 2023/06/27; 2023/07/05; 2023/07/07	有野の挑戦『悪魔城伝説』	Arino's Challenge: Castlevania III: Dracula's Curse (1989)	Split into 4 parts
2023/07/18	有野の挑戦『東京バス案内 今日からキミも運転手』	Arino's Challenge: Tokyo Bus Annai: Kyou Kara Kimi mo Untenshu (2003)	Released as a warm-up for the Saitama Super Arena live event
2023/07/25	有野の挑戦『魂斗羅スピリッツ』	Arino's Challenge: Contra III: The Alien Wars (1992)	Released as a warm-up for the Saitama Super Arena live event
2023/08/01	有野の挑戦『東海道五十三次』	Arino's Challenge: Tōkaidō Gojūsan-tsugi (1986)	N/A
2023/08/08; 2023/08/15	有野の挑戦『キャプテン翼』	Arino's Challenge: Tecmo Cup Soccer Game (1992)	Released as a warm-up for the Saitama Super Arena live event
2023/08/25	DVD-BOX20 発売決定記念生配信『激アツ！GCCXカーニバル』	Fierce Battle! GameCenter CX Carnival	Livestream featuring revenge against Ichidant-R on Mega Drive Mini 2 (condition: Cleared).
2023/09/08; 2023/09/12; 2023/09/15; 2023/09/19	有野の挑戦『ボナンザ ブラザーズ』	Arino's Challenge: Bonanza Bros. (1991)	First re-release ever, split into 4 parts.
2023/09/26	有野の挑戦『ファイナルファイト』	Arino's Challenge: Final Fight (1991)	N/A
2023/10/06; 2023/10/10	有野の挑戦 特別編『有野の挑戦状』	Arino's Challenge Special Edition: Retro Game Challenge (2007)	First re-release ever, split into 2 parts.
2023/10/13; 2023/10/17	GCCX×桜井政博 有野の挑戦 特別編【大乱闘スマッシュブラザーズ】	GameCenter CX × Masahiro Sakurai; Arino's Challenge Special Edition: Super Smash Bros. (1999)	Two-part collab with Masahiro Sakurai featuring Arino playing Super Smash Bros. (condition: Cleared). Additional three episodes can be found in both Japanese and English versions of the Masahiro Sakurai on Creating Games channel.
2023/10/20; 2023/10/24; 2023/10/27	GCCX×桜井政博 振り返れば奴がいた リターンズ	GameCenter CX × Masahiro Sakurai; When I Looked Back, He was There: Returns	Three-part collab with Masahiro Sakurai featuring Arino and Writer Kibe playing Sega games on Mega Drive Mini and Mega Drive Mini 2.
2023/10/31; 2023/11/07; 2023/11/10; 2023/11/14	有野の挑戦『ときめきメモリアル 〜forever with you〜』	Arino's Challenge: Tokimeki Memorial (1996)	Split into 4 parts
2023/11/21	有野の挑戦『バトルゴルファー唯』	Arino's Challenge: Battle Golfer Yui (1991)	Does not include the Staff battle from DVD versions
2023/11/24; 2023/11/28; 2023/12/01; 2023/12/05	有野の挑戦『ロックマン』	Arino's Challenge: Mega Man (1987)	Split into 4 parts
2023/12/19	有野の挑戦『光神話 パルテナの鏡 』	Arino's Challenge: Kid Icarus (1986)	N/A
2023/12/22; 2023/12/26	GCCX20th ハプニング総選挙	GCCX20th Mishappenings	Producer Kan and Arino present 8 moments that were controversial from the entire history of the show. The first video is comments on them while the second is the result of the best through votes. Originally aired as part of the CXPO event.
2024/01/09; 2024/01/12; 2024/01/16; 2024/01/19	有野の挑戦『魂斗羅』	Arino's Challenge: Contra (1988)	Split into 4 parts
2024/01/28	『有野の挑戦状 1+2 REPLAY』もうすぐ発売だよ生配信	Arino no Chōsenjō 1+2 REPLAY live stream	Arino, the developers of GameCenter CX: Arino no Chōsenjō 1+2 REPLAY, members and ex-members of the TV show staff play selected challenges from the remake of the two games for Nintendo Switch.
2024/01/30; 2024/02/02; 2024/02/06; 2024/02/09	有野の挑戦『ゴールデンアックス』	Arino's Challenge: Golden Axe (1989)	First re-release with the Japanese audio intact, split into 4 parts
2024/02/13; 2024/02/16; 2024/02/27; 2024/03/01	有野の挑戦『マドゥーラの翼』	Arino's Challenge: The Wing of Madoola (1986)	Split into 4 parts
2024/02/13; 2024/02/16; 2024/02/27; 2024/03/01	有野の挑戦『マドゥーラの翼』	Arino's Challenge: The Wing of Madoola (1986)	Split into 4 parts
2024/02/20	【遂に発売！】ゲームセンターCX 有野の挑戦状 1+2 REPLAY	Finally Released!: GameCenter CX: Arino no Chōsenjō 1+2 REPLAY	Launch trailer for GameCenter CX: Arino no Chōsenjō 1+2 REPLAY
2024/03/05; 2024/03/08; 2024/03/12; 2024/03/15	有野の挑戦『大魔界村』	Arino's Challenge: Ghouls 'n Ghosts (1989)	Split into 4 parts
2024/03/22	【終・20周年イヤー】YouTubeチャンネル終了！？	End of the 20th Anniversary: The YouTube channel was ended!?	Video about the YouTube channel ending, but actually, it will be only renamed to GameCenter CX and episodes will be uploaded slower than usual.
2024/03/29	有野の挑戦『がんばれゴエモン ゆき姫救出絵巻』	Arino's Challenge: The Legend of the Mystical Ninja (1991)	N/A

== Video releases ==
On June 23, 2011, gaming website Kotaku started streaming English-translated episodes of the series. On January 13, 2012, Kotaku announced that their agreement to broadcast the show had ended; there would be no second season, and existing episodes would be removed when the rights expired. On February 28, 2012, Discotek Media announced that they had acquired the rights to the 12 episodes shown on Kotaku, releasing them on DVD on September 18, 2012.

DVD Boxes

So far there have been twenty DVD sets put out with the latest released in December 2023. Each one contains key episodes, game center visits, and a game challenge exclusive to the DVD set. They are not season compilations.

DVD-Box #	Release date	Games Featured	Game Center Visits Featured	DVD Exclusive Challenge
Vol. 1	23 December 2005	Star Force/Super Mario Bros. 2/Atlantis no Nazo/Ghosts 'n Goblins/Prince of Persia/Super Mario Bros. 3	Hankyu Daily Shoppers	The Transformers: Mystery of Convoy
Vol. 2	23 June 2006	Super Mario World/Adventure Island/Takeshi no Chōsenjō/Solomon's Key/Mega Man 2	Nigiwai Plaza/Nonbiri Onsen	Ikki
Vol. 3	22 December 2006	Ninja Gaiden ^{(Note: Director's Cut version, which includes moments not included back when it was aired.)}/Milon's Secret Castle/Final Fight/Ghouls 'n Ghosts /Quiz Tonosama no Yabou/Contra	The Hot Spring Game Travelogue	TwinBee
Vol. 4	21 December 2007	Yokai Dochuki/Street Fighter II/Mighty Bomb Jack/Septentrion/Umihara Kawase	Hana Yashiki/Tanigawa Stationery Shop/Ayase Batting Center/Ishida/The Far North Game Travelogue	Bomberman
Vol. 5	21 December 2008	Super Ghouls 'n Ghosts /The Fifty-Three Stations of the Tokaido/The Quest of Ki/Rockman/Super Fantasy Zone	Shibamata Haikara Yokochou/Unirose/Denkiya Hall/Azuma Garden Leisure Center/Autobahn	The Tower of Druaga
Vol. 6	18 December 2009	Wagyan Land/The Legend of the Mystical Ninja/Clock Tower/Yo! Noid/The Wing of Madoola /Chelnov/Yuuyu no Quiz de GO! GO! /Fatal Fury Special	Daily Mart Imaya/Takasagoya/Fun Yee Super in South Korea/Kisarazu Central/Omocha no Fukushima/Nokogiriyama Ropeway	Yie Ar Kung Fu
Vol. 7	24 December 2010	Super Mario 64 / Door Door / Doki Doki Panic / Castlevania III: Dracula's Curse / Donkey Kong Country / Mega Man 3 / Battle Golfer Yui	Daiba Icchome Shotengai / Kineya Suzuki / Inagaki Pastry Shop / Dazaifu Amusement Park / Starlanes Plaza / Tokyo Tower / 10-Yen Game Shop / Warehouse Kawasaki	Binary Land
Vol. 8	22 December 2011	Mendel Palace / Densha de Go! / Paris-Dakar Rally Special / The Genji and Heike Clans / Kamaitachi no Yoru / Mega Man 4 ^{(Note: Full version of episodes that had 2 or 3 episodes back when it was aired.)}	Komaya Toy Store / Honpo Smiling / Ikebukuro Batting Cages / Adachi Super Fishing / Juichiya Candy Forest	City Connection
Vol. 9	21 December 2012	Dragon Buster / F-Zero / Battletoads / Tant-R / Dig Dug II / Ninja Spirit / Flying Dragon: The Secret Scroll	Okawa Shoten-Hen / Starlight Takayama Hen / Nakaya Yōgashiten-Hen	Spelunker
Vol. 10	20 December 2013	Super Mario Kart / Sonic The Hedgehog / Gradius / Tokimeki Memorial -Forever with You- / Kirby Bowl / Bonk's Adventure / Tantei Jinguuji Saburou: Shinjuku Chuuou Kouen Satsujin Jiken / Super Gussun Oyoyo	Game in Mekuman / Shakujii Station Center / Rokobouru / Tōbudōbutsukōen / Ogasawara bungu-ten / Yamamoto shōten / Natsukashi yokochō / Games Cosmos / Kodomo no mise miharashi ya kashi-ten / Hiyoko	Pooyan
Vol. 11	9 December 2014	Super Mario World 2: Yoshi's Island / Super Chinese / Gargoyle's Quest II / Metro-Cross / Space Hunter / Famicom Trainer Jogging Race	G-Front / Tokyo Germany Village / Iseki / Natsuge Museum / Harada Ya	Castlevania
Vol. 12	18 December 2015	Super Mario Land / Parappa the Rapper / Family Jockey / Sky Kid / Mega Man X / R-Type	Try Amusement Tower / Game in Asobiba 20 / Honjo Kaeru Honpo / Net Cafe Charade / Toshimaen / Cosmo	Resident Evil: Director's Cut
Mega Drive Special	2 September 2016	Comix Zone /Strider /Dynamite Headdy /Pulseman /Mansion of Hidden Souls /Gunstar Heroes	N/A	Sonic the Hedgehog 2
Vol. 13	16 December 2016	Commando (video game) /Hokkaido Rensa Satsujin: Ohotsuku ni Kiyu /D /Crazy Climber /Zelda II: The Adventure of Link	Ueno Matsuzakaya /Houzouyama Ropeway /Yao Department Store /Auto Parlor Ageo /Kanda U.S. store /Shin-Koiwa Sunny Bowl	Ganbare Goemon 2
PC Engine Special	2 August 2017	Cho Aniki /Adventure Quiz Capcom World: Hatena Hatena no Daibouken /Kaizou Choujin Shubibinman /China Warrior /Märchen Maze /Kattobi! Takuhai-kun	N/A	New Adventure Island
Vol. 14	22 December 2017	Donkey Kong Country 2: Diddy's Kong Quest /Kirby's Adventure /Trojan /Ninja-kun: Ashura no Shō /Double Dragon /Kid Icarus	Tokyu Plaza Kamata "Kamaiten", Shizukuishi mukashigatari-kan, Omocha no boshūya, Okada-ya, Kosuda Shōten	Super Dodge Ball: PC Extra Edition
GameCenter CX Best Selection Blu-Ray	2 August 2018	Red version: Atlantis no Nazo / Prince of Persia / Ninja Gaiden / Sonic the Hedgehog; Green version: Ghosts 'n Goblins / Tokimeki Memorial / Super Mario World / Clock Tower	Shikoku and Ehime from Kochi (Director's Cut, Red version); Shikoku and Ehime from Kagawa (Director's Cut, Green version)	Red version: Atlantis no Nazo (Famicom Mini); Green version: Ghosts 'n Goblins (Famicom Mini)
Vol. 15	21 December 2018	Ape Escape/Nekketsu Kōha Kunio-kun/Clock Tower 2/Densha de Go! 64/Super Contra/Virtua Fighter 2	Asakusa Batting Stadium, Kasuka Yumoto Onsen, Chichibu Muse Park, Miyakawa, Vivid Square, Kissa Julian, Neverland, Gamefuji Ichikawa-ten	Resident Evil 2
Vol. 16	20 December 2019	Pilotwings / Super Puyo Puyo / Quiz Tonosama no Yabō 2: Zenkoku-ban / Megaman X2 / Metroid / Yamamura Misa Suspense: Kyōto Ryuu no Tera Satsujin	N/A	Tokimeki Memorial 2
Vol. 17	18 December 2020	Captain Tsubasa / Battle Formula / Ice Climber / Splatterhouse 2 / Meikyujima	Tamage in Russia	Phoenix Wright: Ace Attorney
Vol. 18	17 December 2021	Earthbound / Ganbare Goemon 2: Kiteretsu Shōgun McGuiness / The House of the Dead / Kirby 64: The Crystal Shards / The Legend of Kage / Super R-Type / Tower of Babel	Gifu-ya, Chūko taiya ichiba Sagamihara-ten, Tetsu kentarō, Taikeien, Shin-Omiya Batting Center, Game Paradise Zero One	Momotaro Dentetsu V
Vol. 19	16 December 2022	Captain Tsubasa Vol. II: Super Striker / F-Zero X / Super Bomberman / River City Girls Zero / Journey to Silius / Joy Mech Fight / Nuts & Milk (Limited Edition Director's Cut)	Akai Fuusen Biru, Cafe Terrace Gon, Dream, Dagashiya Warung Jero Warun, Adores Isago Store, Sakurakan	Metal Gear Solid
Vol. 20	15 December 2023	The Legend of Zelda / Portopia Renzoku Satsujin Jiken / Ico / Space Channel 5 / Monster Attack / KiKi KaiKai / Getsu Fuuma Den	Tsurugamine Batting Center, Omocha no Sankei, Copa III, Auto Parlor V1, Everyday Gyoda Store, Dakashiya, Daiei Bowl	Resident Evil 3: Nemesis
Vol. 21	13 December 2024	Dragon Warrior / Castlevania: Rondo of Blood / ActRaiser / Space Harrier / Devil Dice / Samurai Shodown / Bloody Wolf	Saitama Sports Center, Cafe Mikado, Astro Yamato Batting Center, Dagashi Gen, Game Cosmo Tsurumi, Daitokyo Sogo Oroshiuri Center, Game Ribbon	Star Soldier
Vol. 22	12 December 2025	Mega Man 5 / I.Q.: Intelligent Qube / Super Monkey Ball / Clock Tower II: The Struggle Within / Wrecking Crew / Gain Ground / The NewZealand Story	Toy Park Masamiya, Kobayashi Kashiten, Decoboco Shop, OTAGAYA Store, Game Center Le Monde Komagata, Gorilla Batting Center Minami Hatogayaten, Game in Good Day 21	Monster Hunter
Vol. 23	11 December 2026	Final Fantasy Adventure / Ninja Gaiden II / Mario Kart 64 / Challenger / Super Star Force / Blue Train Satsujin Jiken	Ichise Shōten, Kanariya, Mikamo, Yokohama Hakkeijima Sea Paradise, Meruhen, Misato Young Bowl, Amusement Field BAYON	Mega Man Battle Network

Rental DVDs

Rental DVDs are budget versions of DVD boxes, containing several challenges, several Tamage and a little bonus video.

No.	Release date	Game(s) Featured	Game Center Visit(s) Featured	Extra(s)
1.0	26 February 2007	Prince of Persia / Ghosts 'n Goblins	Futtsu Mother Farm / Jinbōchō Game Corner Mickey	Arino's report
2.0	5 October 2007	Atlantis no Nazo / Adventure Island (video game) / Solomon's Key	Enoshima Garden Parlor	Arino's report from Seoul
3.0	7 December 2007	Ninja Gaiden / Mega Man 2 / Contra	Akihabara G Front	Arino's report from TGS 2007
4.0	8 August 2008	Mighty Bomb Jack	Tanikawa Stationary Store / Ayase Batting Center	A message from the KACHO to buyers worldwide
5.0	3 October 2008	Ghouls 'n Ghosts / Umihara Kawase	Myoho-yu Hot Spring	Report from Arino and Kan
6.0	5 December 2008	Yokai Dochuki / Quiz Tonosama no Yabou	Unirose Yokodo Store	Tōjima's report from TGS 2008
7.0	7 August 2009	SOS / Super Fantasy Zone	Ishida	Arino's report from Taito Game Station
8.0	2 October 2009	Street Fighter II: The World Warrior / Tokaido Gojusan Tsugi	Azuma Garden Leisure Center	Flashback on previous challenges
9.0	4 December 2009	Quest of Ki	Denkiya Hall	Tōjima's report from TGS 2009
10.0	6 August 2010	Clock Tower / Super Ghouls 'n Ghosts	Daily Mart Imaya	Arino's report from JJ CLUB 100
11.0	8 October 2010	Mega Man / Wagan Land	Autobahn	Nakayama and Takahashi's reports on United States of Odaiba 2010
12.0	10 December 2010	The Legend of the Mystical Ninja / Final Fight	Takasagoya	Report by temporary director from TGS 2010
13.0	12 August 2011	Fatal Fury Special / The Wing of Madoola	Shibamata Haikara Yokochou	Surprise interview with Nakayama
14.0	14 October 2011	Yūyu no Quiz de Go! Go! / Kamen no Ninja Hanamaru	Nokogiriyama Ropeway	Surprise interview with Emoto at United States of Odaiba 2011
15.0	9 December 2011	Takeshi no Chōsenjō / Battle Golfer Yui	Hanayashiki	Takahashi's report from TGS 2011
16.0	5 October 2012	Mega Man 3	Kineya Suzuki / Juichiya Candy Forest	Inoue's breaking report from Nihone, Iwate
17.0	7 December 2012	Atomic Runner / Mendel Palace	Inagaki Pastry Shop	Arino's report at United States of Odaiba 2012
18.0	9 August 2013	Paris-Dakar Rally Special / Castlevania III: Dracula's Curse	The Hot Spring Game Travelogue	Arino's report in Harada Ya
19.0	11 October 2013	Kamaitachi no Yoru	The Far North Game Travelogue	Arino's report at Paris JAPAN Expo backstage
20.0	8 August 2014	Battletoads	Trip to Korea by Economy Class	Arino's report in Wonder Park Sapporo
21.0	8 October 2014	Dig Dug II / Ninja Spirit	Nigiwai Plaza	Arino's report at United States of Odaiba 2014
22.0	7 August 2015	Milon's Secret Castle / Dragon Buster	The Kacho Goes to the Cannes Film Festival	Arino's report at Shinkoiwa Sunny Bowl
23.0	9 October 2015	Mega Man 4	Daiba Icchome Shotengai / Omocha no Fukushima	Arino's thoughts on the show's 13th year at Ho Chi Minh Mausoleum
24.0	12 August 2016	Tokimeki Memorial / Bonk's Adventure	10-Yen Game Shop / Ikebukuro Batting Center	Arino's love philosophy at New Reoma World
25.0	14 October 2016	Gradius / Gargoyle's Quest II	Kikuchi Store / Miracle Inn	Arino at Doll Sankyuu
26.0	10 August 2017	Derby Stallion / Tantei Jinguuji Saburou: Shinjuku Chuuou Kouen Satsujin Jiken	Game in Asobiba 20	GameCenter CX in Pacific: Japan Monkey Park footage
27.0	8 October 2017	Mega Man X	Fukuoka Hometown Special / Starlanes Plaza	Small footage at Hanayashiki
28.0	10 August 2018	R-Type / Kung Fu Heroes	Tōbudōbutsukōen	Arino's thoughts on the 15 years of GameCenter CX
29.0	12 October 2018	Family Jockey	Tokyo Germany Village	Arino and Kibe's fish feeding in Katsurahama Aquarium
30.0	9 August 2019	Family Trainer: Jogging Race / Double Dragon	Kanda U.S. store	Family Trainer: Jogging Race Memories at Otdykha Im. Yu. Gagarina
31.0	11 October 2019	Ninja-kun: Ashura no Shō	Toshimaen	GameCenter CX in Russia: Interacting with fans in Moscow
32.0	14 August 2020	Metro-Cross	Houzouyama Ropeway	Secrets of GameCenter CX's existence in 16 years
33.0	9 October 2020	Crazy Climber / Sky Kid	Harada Ya	Arino's Challenge failure showcase
34.0	13 August 2021	Mega Man X2	Neverland / Miyakawa	TBA
35.0	10 October 2021	D / Nekketsu Kōha Kunio-kun	Shin-Koiwa Sunny Bowl	TBA
36.0	12 August 2022	Clock Tower 2	Omocha no Boshūya	TBA
37.0	7 October 2022	Tant-R	Chichibu Muse Park	TBA
38.0	10 August 2023	Kickle Cubicle / Quiz Tonosama no Yabou 2	Cosmo	TBA
39.0	13 October 2023	Splatterhouse 2	Kosuda Shōten	TBA

Other DVDs

Name	Release date	Games Featured	Extras	Exclusive Challenge(s)
Arino no Chousenjou 2 Special Edition!	26 February 2009	Ultraman: Towards the Future / Ultraseven	Cheat codes and tricks from GameCenter CX: Arino no Chousenjou 2	Retro Game Challenge; GameCenter CX: Arino no Chousenjou 2
GameCenter CX24: Kacho Saves the Lemmings	27 August 2010	24 hour special (Lemmings) / Document24	Pre-live show / Audio commentary review of the 24-hour special	N/A
GameCenter CX in USA	31 August 2012	GameCenter CX in USA / Golden Axe (from RGM DVDs) / Zombie Nation	Quiz about locations in USA / Visit to Nakayama's alma mater (Fresno) / Arino's interview in Hollywood / People in my Head	Die Hard Arcade
3-chome no Arino Special Edition!	20 March 2014	Dragon Power / Pac-Man 2: The New Adventures	Cheat codes and tricks from GameCenter CX: 3-chome no Arino	GameCenter CX: Arino no Chousenjou 2 GameCenter CX: 3-chome no Arino
GameCenter CX: Arino's Challenge in Budokan	2 July 2014	Arino's Challenge in Budokan / Arino's Challenge in Budokan Document (Director's Cut, audio commentary) / Derby Stallion	Review meeting of Arino's Challenge in Budokan / Tatakae! Kacho Fighter live performance / Tatakae! Kacho Fighter video clip	N/A
GameCenter CX THE MOVIE: 1986 Mighty Bomb Jack	2 September 2014	GameCenter CX The Movie: 1986 Mighty Bomb Jack	Behind-the-scenes / Documentary on advertising across Japan	Bomb Jack
GameCenter CX 15th Anniversary	2 August 2019	Arino's Challenge in Makuhari Messe / Arino's Challenge in Makuhari Messe Documentary / Märchen Maze / Majyūō	Event meeting / GCCX MAX video clip / Good Ending Corner	N/A
Arino no Chousenjō 1+2 REPLAY Bandai Namco Special	22 February 2024	Oishinbo: Kyuukyoku no Menu Sanbon Shoubu / Pac-Land	Scenes from "Game-itization Project" segments / Robot Ninja Haggleman drawing song by indieszero's Suzui	Kinnikuman: Kinnikusei Oui Soudatsusen
GameCenter CX: Arino's Challenge in Saitama Super Arena: 20th Anniversary Big Special	2 August 2024	Arino's Challenge in Saitama Super Arena Special Edition / Punch-Out!! / Tokyo Bus Annai / Dragon's Lair / Contra Spirits	Saitama Super Arena Documentary / Saitama Event Staff Meeting / Clip collection recorded before the show / ENDINGRATULATION movie clip	N/A
GameCenter CX Official Pirated Version^{(Note: Available as a major prize raffle only)}	11 October 2024	SkateCat	Amusement Field BAYON	N/A

== Segments ==
Each episode of GameCenter CX is made up of a number of different segments. The only segment which appears in every episode is Arino's Challenge. The other segments vary by episode and season. However, the episodes that appear on Kotaku omit these segments, instead of focusing only on the challenge of the week.

Segment	Featured in;	Description
Arino's Challenge	All seasons	Arino is challenged with beating or performing a certain task in a classic video game, typically reaching the end of the game. He is seated in a small office within the Fuji Television building at a table covered in various snack foods and drinks. In front of him is a small TV and the challenge game with an accompanying console. In order to aid his progress, he is allowed to call upon the various staff members who work on the show for assistance. He is often presented with various materials which will help his progress such as strategy guides and maps. The challenge usually runs for one day although exceptions can be made at the discretion of the producer and if Arino has the will to go on. If Arino fails at a challenge then the task is handed over to the Assistant Directors who must work to complete the challenge. Arino's Challenge was originally a short companion to the extensive interview segments found in the first season of the show before becoming the focus of the show in the second season. This format has remained unchanged ever since.
I'd Like to Meet This Man	1st and 2nd seasons	In this segment, Arino visited and talked to various people from the Japanese gaming industry ranging from creators of blockbuster games to obscure cult classics. In the first season, he spent the bulk of a given episode mainly talking to various people within a company. When the primary focus shifted to Arino's Challenge starting with the second season, he spoke to individuals. The final segment was a compilation of previous segments featuring some new footage.
Game Collections	1st ~ 9th, 11th ~ 29th season	Interstitials shown during episodes that show a brief description of games related to a company (1st and 2nd seasons) or annual order (3rd season and onward) along with some gameplay footage. Each game collections segment usually features games that were released during a certain time period as specified at the beginning of the segment or fall within a certain theme of the episode. Between seasons 3 to 9 and 11 to 15, the show focused on Famicom and Disk System games. Starting with season 16 to 20, the segment shifted its focus to Game Boy games from 1989 ~ 1994. From seasons 21 to 26, the segment focused on Super Famicom games from 1990 ~ 1995. With Season 27, the segment now covers both PC Engine and Mega Drive games.
You Should Visit this Game Center Sometimes (TamaGe)	All seasons	Originally debuted in the very last episode of 1st season as a trip to Hot Springs in Hakone; each new episode in this segment begins with Arino reading a suggestion from a viewer regarding a game center, shop, or other such amusement area that contains one or more arcade cabinets or unique games. Arino visits these locations throughout Japan and plays a variety of different games often with the goal of winning prizes to be given to winning viewers. This segment was briefly interrupted during most of Season 24 and earlier Season 25 episodes (302 ~ 331) due to the restrictions from COVID-19 in Japan, being filled with reprises of previous places or omitted entirely.
Ring-Ring Tactics!	3rd season	Beginning and ending with season three, Arino was tasked with completing the poorly received Famicom game Super Monkey Daibouken. As the title suggests, Arino was allowed to call viewers who sent in postcards for advice or encouragement. He eventually cleared the game in the finale of season three.
Urawaza Jet Stream	4th season	A short segment begins with Arino stepping into a sound booth in a recording studio and reading fond recollections from the viewers of their favorite games. The segment ends with a request for a well-known secret or cheats from the game subsequently followed by footage of the trick or cheat being performed.
The Aces of Hardware Won't Appear	5th season	Arino tries out various "hidden gems" among classic gaming consoles, that were overshadowed in popularity by their competitors. Some systems that appeared in this segment were the 3DO, the Master System, and the Tomy Tutor.
The Romance Never Ends	6th season	A very tongue-in-cheek segment in which Arino plays various Famicom games in search of salacious scenes featuring women. Once he has found such a scene he takes a picture of it using his phone.
Game & Watch, I Can't Leave You Alone	7th season	The focus of this segment was on Game & Watch devices. Each segment would focus on a different series of the Game & Watch franchise with Arino playing some of the games in that particular series. Once he was done playing the games he was shown the absurdly high resale prices of each game, to his own shock.
The Game Center CX Game-itization Project	7th and 8th season	These segments which ran over two seasons followed the development process of the first Game Center CX game, Retro Game Challenge. It featured Arino talking with the development team and pitching his own ideas of what should be included in the release.
The Return of Ring-Ring Tactics!	8th season	The return of the original Ring-Ring Tactics segment this time with a new game, Championship Lode Runner. With the help of the viewers, he cleared the game by the end of the season.
The Xevious Observation Diary	8th and 9th season	These short, silent film-inspired segments involved Arino entering the invincibility code into Xevious for the Famicom before fastening a clip onto the controller's fire button and leaving the game to run throughout the season, in order to see what would happen if the game's infinitely looping design stayed running for long periods of time. Halfway through the season, a box was placed over the system and TV to conceal the potential result until the end of the season. At the end of the season 9, the box was removed, revealing that the game was turned off at some point. There are indications that a planned power outage on July 6 was the cause.
The Famicom Manga Café	9th season	This segment takes place in a small café where Arino is seen sitting at a table reading a newspaper. He is then brought an 80s manga series focused on the Famicom and a cup of tea. Here he typically reads a chapter of the first volume and then skips to the last chapter of the last volume to see how the series ends. He reads out loud and adds color commentary as well as his own thoughts about the series.
GameCenter CX NEWS	9th season (recurrent)	Random news about the show such as new sales of goods and post-event reactions related to the show, narrated by Fuji TV announcers.
Singing About Whatever the Hell You Want	10th season	In this segment, Arino is provided with a viewer-selected music clip from a game and a lyric sheet to sing along with it.
The Game Center CX Game-itization Project 2	10th season	This segment follows the development of the sequel to Retro Game Challenge, GameCenter CX: Arino no Chōsenjō 2.
Everything Important in Life I Learned From Video Game Strategy Guides	11th season	A Buddhist priest reads a particularly inspiring/profound passage from a video game strategy guide to the assembled staff. He then elaborates on the passage comparing it to real life. The staff chants the advice, with Arino providing some humorous final thoughts.
A Waste of Color	12th season	Arino tries out a handful of black & white Game Boy games, supplied by Kibe. He then typically chooses one that he'd like to see remade in color, and provides an illustration of how he thinks the remake might look.
Shocking Videos MAX	13th season	Former AD Inoue invites Arino into his apartment to watch a series of videos of gruesome accidents in video games. Innocuous mistakes like crashing your bike in Excitebike are over-dramatized with slow-mo, intense music, and countdowns to the carnage.
To Catch a Catch Copy	14th season	Arino and two former GCCX staffers, Toujima and Nakayama, convene in a traditional home with a table of games blanketed in front of them. The show's female announcer, Ms. Takeda, reads a game's tagline, and the three men pick what game they think it is, and why, with the goal being simply to see who gets the most right.
Retro Read-Aloud	15th season	Arino and news announcer Ms. Nishiyama do dramatic readings of key scenes from various games, such as the melodramatic Fire Emblem.
Project CX: Peripherals	15th season	Arino and crew try out various Famicom accessories, ranging from standard pads and joysticks to the more infamous Robot and Power Glove. The title and opening sequence is a reference to the documentary series Project X: Chōsenshatachi.
Ice Cream Corner	15th season (recurrent)	Major announcements related to the TV show (shows, presential events, online broadcasts, trips, etc.) made by the Producer Kan where Arino is caught eating ice cream in a break at the window from the Gascoin Company office or his challenge room.
Famicom Living National Treasures	16th season	Arino, now 90 years old, is presented with fake Famicom games and reminisces on their contents as though they were games he played in his youth.
Barcode Gambler	16th season	Arino and crew use a barcode battling device to scan the barcodes of two games, and Arino places a bet on which game will come out on top.
Family Computer Sniper	17th season	Parodying Golgo 13, Arino tries to identify games featured from past episodes using a pair of binoculars attached to a Super Scope in a sniper-like scenario.
The Game Center CX Game-itization Project 3	17th season	This segment returns once again to cover and help in the development of GameCenter CX: 3-Chōme no Arino for Nintendo 3DS, including cameos and visits from developers at G.rev.
When I Looked Back, He Was There	17th season	In celebration of the 30th anniversary of the Sega SG-1000, Arino and Kibe looked back at games that were released for the console. The segment is also a reference for the Fuji TV drama of the same name. It had a brief revival as When I Looked Back, He Was There Returns, as a part of YouTube crossovers with Masahiro Sakurai but featuring Mega Drive games from Sega on Mega Drive Mini and Mega Drive Mini 2.
Famicom Box	18th season	Arino and former Director Inoue are at a hot spring resort playing installed games on the Famicom Box, which has 15 games to challenge, in a matter of 10 minutes.
GameCenter MSX	18th season	Arino and Kibe looked back at the games that were released for the MSX computer system. This segment also features Arino as a Shacho (President), finally taking the job over Producer Kan.
DJ Monster	19th season	In a similar style to the Barcode Gambler segment, Arino and crew use the PlayStation game Monster Rancher and two J-pop CDs to create two different monsters to battle, and Arino places a bet on which CD/monster will come out on top.
Chief Arino's Bonus Assessment	19th season	Arino must beat all the Bonus Stages on several video games in order to finally get a raise in his salary.
Asking in Shibuya	20th season	Stylized after a news program led by former Fuji TV announcer Yuuko Takeda, the TV show staff interviews young women about how they are aware in knowledge about retro gaming. As with most variety shows, Arino reacts to them in real-time.
Quiz Faminioaire	20th season	Arino plays a video game-themed version of Who Wants To Be A Millionaire, in order to earn special prizes.
2P Battles Without Honor: Mario Bros. Edition	21st season	Arino plays Mario Brothers on the Famicom Mini against former ADs.
Learning game Courses	21st season	Arino tries to learn things from educational games with Kibe, such as Donkey Kong Jr. Math, Mario Paint, and Dance Aerobics.
Board store coffee shop	22nd season	Arino plays obscure arcade games.
Eyes On! Famicom Appraisers!	22nd season	Arino, with the help of Kibe attempts to spot differences between Famicom cartridges of the same game.
Good-Bye Game Boy	23rd season	Arino and Kibe showcase various accessories and peripherals that were released for the Game Boy.
Until the Udon Boils	23rd season	Arino plays gaming-themed goods while waiting for Kibe to finish cooking udon.
Gaming House of Fortunes	24th season	Arino gets his fortune told via various fortune-telling (Uranai) themed games for the PlayStation by Little River (PR Ogawa).
Thursday Opening-Only Theatre	24th season	Arino visits a theatre that only shows opening movies from various video games.
The Moon Is Beautiful, I Love You!	25th season	Arino and Kibe, with the help of a translator, learn various differences between English and Japanese versions of the same game, such as enemy names and even game titles. Arino later gets quizzed on words that have been said during the segment.
Bar Dream Matching	25th season	Arino drinks beverages while hearing music from certain games, such as Uncharted Waters II, Super Fantasy Zone, and Kamaitachi no Yoru. The music is generally used with MA Tanii in random situations as comedy sketches.
Mini Cornya~	26th season	Arino and an AD play games that feature cats, such as Mappy, Star Fox 64, and Parodius Da!.
KACHOxFAMILY	26th season	Parodying the Anime and Manga series Spy × Family, an AD cosplaying Anya Forger brings Arino obscure Game Controllers that didn't sell well due to varying issues and tests them in the game it is meant to be played.
Dangerous Safety Zone	27th season	Arino attempts to discover a safe spot inside shooting games alongside the Director. The Safety Zone is a reference to Anzen Chitai, which plays the Wine Red no Kokoro song at the end.
Game-itization Project 2023	27th season	Development diary of GameCenter CX: Arino no Chōsenjō 1+2 REPLAY, a remake of the first two games on Nintendo DS for Nintendo Switch, which includes Arino paying visits to the new co-developer, MUTAN, to look and help with the development of new features of the game, including the new minigame exclusive to the remake, Honō no Kakutō Salaryman Yattarō.
Fishing Zanmai	28th season	Arino goes into a sushi bar and play fishing games recommended by the sushi bar owner (Kibe). After the gameplay, Arino eats regional sushi.
Mini Corner	28th season	Arino takes a look on the previous segments, ranging from bad to popular ones, plus unused ideas.
chocoGAME	29th season	Arino plays games inside a gym. The name of the segment is based after the chocoZAP brand of athletic gyms in Japan.
Chief WARNING!	29th season	Arino discovers TurboDuo (Super CD-ROM²) games that does feature extras when playing with a wrong System Card (TurboGrafx-CD or CD-ROM²).
Chief Arino's Rare Pokémon Encyclopedia	30th season	Arino catches rare Pokémon in certain games from the franchise in order to celebrate the series' 30th anniversary.
Piko Piko PICO	30th season	Arino plays educational games on the Sega Pico.
