= Bio Senshi Dan: Increaser to no Tatakai =

1987 video game

Bio-Senshi Dan: Increaser to no Tatakai
- Cover art
- Developer(s): Atlus
- Publisher(s): Jaleco
- Composer(s): Tsukasa Masuko
- Platform(s): Family Computer
- Release: JP: September 22, 1987
- Genre(s): Action-adventure
- Mode(s): Single-player

Bio-Senshi Dan: Increaser to no Tatakai (Note: Japanese: ダン バイオ戦士DAN インクリーザーとの闘い) is a 1987 action-adventure game that was released exclusively in Japan for the Nintendo Famicom.

Initially, there were plans to bring the game to the English market under the title Bashi Bazook: Morphoid Masher, but they fell through due to the game's similarity to Xexyz. English-translated ROMs of the game later became widely circulated on the Internet.

== Story ==
In the year 2081, Earth is taken over by a group of hostile monsters under the command of a mysterious entity known as the "Increaser". A warrior named Dan travels in his time machine from the year 2081 to the year 1999 in order to stop the invasion before it could spell devastation for the humans.

== Gameplay ==
Being chased by an enemy while figuring out what to do next.

Emphasis is placed on exploration in the gameplay. Enemies must be defeated to earn energy points that can be spent on power-ups to improve the player's character. While starting out with a basic sword, other weapons can either be found or bought. There is no linear order on how a stage progresses. There are five different levels, each with deadly traps and surprises. Boss battles are fought at the end of levels.

As the game progresses, bosses and normal enemies become more difficult to defeat. The bosses also become larger as the levels progress. Players must also face a strict time limit that determines how powerful bosses are at the end of the level. Going through the levels quickly will allow the player to confront weaker states of bosses, while taking longer amounts of time will force the player to confront more powerful states of bosses.

In the Japanese version of the game, all shopkeepers use the Kansai dialect of Japanese.
