= Space Hunter =

1986 video game

- Cover art
- Developer(s): Kemco
- Publisher(s): Kemco
- Designer(s): Yasushi Hirashita
- Programmer(s): Shinobu Michiura; Fumio Tono; Tomoharu Aihara; Kiminari Sueda; Minori Shinagawa; Makoto Kario; Fumi Iwamoto
- Composer(s): Hiroyuki Masuno
- Platform(s): Family Computer
- Release: JP: September 25, 1986
- Genre(s): Action
- Mode(s): Single-player

Space Hunter (スペースハンター) is a Japan-exclusive video game that was released in 1986 for the Family Computer. The game was developed and published by Kemco, which was then known as Kotobuki System.

== Plot ==
The plot revolves around a robotic revolt led by a robot named De Gaulle in the year 2199 AD. By the explosions of global nuclear war, society has broken up into nine small expulsions, one of them disappeared and Venus collided with another celestial object. Humanity only slightly survived. Its thread of life barely connected to a body, which was rebuilt into a cyborg. The heroine is named Al Tiana and is also apparently a robot who does not support the rebellion. She is out to prove her loyalty to the humans.
