= Wurm: Journey to the Center of the Earth =

1991 video game

- North American cover art
- Developer: Cyclone System
- Publishers: SOFEL (Japan); Asmik (North America)
- Producer: Yoshiyuki Ishikawa
- Designers: Shoichi Yoshikawa; Hiroshi Kazama; Masasuke Aruga
- Artist: Shoichi Yoshikawa
- Composer: Dota Ando
- Platform: Nintendo Entertainment System
- Release: NA: November 1991; JP: November 15, 1991
- Genre: Action game
- Mode: Single-player

Wurm: Journey to the Center of the Earth, released in Japan as Vazolder: The Underground Battle Space (地底戦空バゾルダー, Chitei Sen Kū Bazorudā), is a multi-genre video game developed by Cyclone System and published by Asmik and SOFEL for the Nintendo Entertainment System in 1991.

== Gameplay ==
Gameplay screenshot

Wurm has a variety of different styles of play, with side-scrolling travel stages in the VZR vehicles, overhead shooting levels, levels where the protagonist Moby leaves the vehicle to explore underground ruins, and first-person shooting levels with boss monsters. Boss monsters have a probability meter that has to be raised up to 100% before that enemy can be eliminated. More characters join the crew over the course of the game. Moby must leave her vehicle in certain sections of the game to fight the enemies in a side-scrolling fashion. Her set of combat skills include a kick, jump and the use of a firearm. Players lose the game if they run out of either fuel or energy in the life bar.

== Plot ==
The plot of this video game deals with mysterious earthquakes that emerge in the year 1999, and the government dispatches explorers in powerful digging machines called Vazorudas or VZRs (renamed WURM in the US manual, but the name is never used in the game). Moby is an 18-year-old leader of one VZR's crew. While doing some research near the core of the earth, Moby and her friends discover that two races of subterranean humans have been fighting a war underground. Contact is lost with four VZRs with the player controlling the crew of the fifth, who discovered that the previous teams were attacked by a subterranean empire of monsters called the Nonmalta. The Nonmalta are at war with a race of peaceful humanoids called the Dinamur, and the VZR crew find themselves embroiled in the war as well.

== Reception ==
Reception

Review score
Publication	Score
PlayStation Magazine (JP)	18.5/30

Nintendo Power gave the game a rating of 14.8 out of 20 in their September 1991 issue, while GamePro assigned the game a 16 out of 25.

== Reviews ==
- Questicle.net
