= Sasa (video game) =

1984 video game

- Family Computer cover art
- Developer(s): Mass Tael (MSX1); Workss (Famicom)
- Publisher(s): ASCII
- Platform(s): MSX1; Family Computer
- Release: MSX1: JP: 1984; Famicom: JP: August 9, 1985
- Genre(s): Arcade
- Mode(s): Single-player

Sasa is an arcade video game released for the MSX1 in 1984, and later for the Family Computer as Astro Robo SASA (アストロロボSASA) in 1985.

This video game involved obtaining capsules with an 'E' on them, sometimes suspended by balloons. The main character could only use bullets to propel himself, and when the bullet count reaches 0, the game ends. A player can also lose bullets by colliding with an enemy, the other player, or the other player's bullets.
