= Yūyu no Quiz de Go! Go! =

1990 video game

- Arcade flyer
- Publisher: Taito
- Composers: Tamayo Kawamoto; Kiyohiro Sada; Masako Inata
- Platforms: Arcade, Super Famicom
- Release: Arcade: 1990; Super Famicom: JP: July 10, 1992
- Genre: Quiz
- Modes: Single-player, multiplayer

Yūyu no Quiz de Go! Go! (ゆうゆのクイズでＧＯ！ＧＯ！) is a Japanese quiz video game released by Taito for the arcades in 1990, and later ported to the Super Famicom platform.

The game was featured in episode 72 (10th Season) of GameCenter CX. Yūyu no Quiz de Go! Go! (Director's Cut) is featured in the DVD-Box Vol. 6, released on December 18, 2009.

== Summary ==
Yūyu was the nickname of Yukiko Iwai, a teen idol from the 1980s and early 1990s, who was a member of the pop group Onyanko Club.
