= Battle Golfer Yui =

1991 video game

- Developer: Santos
- Publisher: Sega
- Director: Kin-chan 68000
- Programmers: Sōtarō Suzuki (Catherine); Tsukasa Aoki (Tsukasa-chan)
- Artists: Ano Shimizu (Ano Okata); Hiroyuki Hirama(Mappira‑kun); Hitorin.hagaitai; Toshichan; Kanako Koyama (Kanchan); Tatta
- Writer: Kin-chan 68000
- Composers: K. Nakayama (Nakachan 3-sai); Kentakun.yada!; Kei Maruyama (Maruchan wa Omotta); Masayuki Nagao (Kyoporiran)
- Platform: Mega Drive
- Release: JP: February 15, 1991
- Genres: Sports, RPG
- Modes: Single-player, multiplayer

Battle Golfer Yui (バトルゴルファー唯; "Battle Golfer Yui") is a 1991 video game developed by Santos and published by Sega for the Mega Drive. It is a golf video game where the player must stop a mad scientist. Upon release the game did not receive good reviews.

== Gameplay ==
The game essentially combines a traditional golf tournament with a plot by a mad professor to take over the world while using that golf tournament as its legitimate front. Yui Mizuhara and Ran Ryuzaki are two normal high school girls who are excellent at golf so they get drafted for this assignment. They are abducted by Professor G, but Yui is liberated before he can brainwash her into his organization.

Players can talk to their opponents before teeing against them in oddly-themed golf courses. Special abilities can be invoked at a certain cost to the attribute that is the equivalent of magic points in standard role-playing games.

== Reception ==
Reception

Review scores
Publication	Score
Famitsu	3/10, 5/10, 6/10, 3/10
Mega Drive Fan	17.98/30
Aktueller Software Markt	28/50
Joystick	35%

Battle Golfer Yui was released in Japan for the Sega Mega Drive on February 15, 1991.
