= Majūō =

1995 video game

- Cover art by Satoru Fukushima
- Developer: Nihon Soft System
- Publishers: KSS; Columbus Circle (re-release)
- Director: Hideyuki Furuhashi
- Producer: Hideo Takano
- Programmers: Takaaki Sōno; Takashi Sugimoto
- Artists: Chie Aoki; Mitsuru Kohno
- Composers: Hiroshi Iizuka; Tomohiro Endo
- Platform: Super Famicom
- Release: JP: 25 August 1995
- Genre: Action
- Mode: Single-player

Majūō (Note: Japanese: 魔獣王; also known as King of Demons.) is a 1995 Japanese action game published by KSS for the Super Famicom. The story is that of a man named Abel who must rescue his wife and child from hell. It is a 2D side scrolling game. Defeating bosses allows the player to transform into various demons. In 2024, there was an announcement of a new release from Retro-Bit.

== Release ==
The game was released in Japan on August 25, 1995 for the Super Famicom, and was published by KSS.

The game has had a high resell value. A 2016 guide listed it as selling for 30,000 yen with just the cartridge, and 100,000 yen with the cartridge and box. In 2018, stores reselling copies of the original game could sell the game for prices as high as 58,300 yen to 69,800 yen.

The game was given a limited re-release in a physical media format on May 24, 2018 by Softgarage via Columbus Circle. It retailed for 5,580 yen.

== Reception ==
Reception

Review scores
Publication	Score
Famitsu	6/10, 6/10, 5/10, 6/10
Nintendo Life	8/10

The game was noted for its high difficulty.

Stuart Hunt of Retro Gamer praised the game saying "It's wonderfully atmospheric and amazingly detailed, exhibiting the same impressive attention to detail that Konami afforded to early Castlevania games." Retro Gamer also recommended the game among the top five games for British gamers to import, alongside Magical Pop'n, DoRemi Fantasy, Chrono Trigger, and Ogre Battle. They described the game as "Castlevania with a Gun", and questioned why the game was not released outside of Japan.

Nintendo Life reviewed it and gave it an 8 out of 10 score.
