= Xexyz =

1988 video game

- North American NES box art
- Developer: Atlus
- Publisher: Hudson Soft
- Composer: Hirohiko Takayama
- Platform: NES
- Release: JP: August 26, 1988; NA: April 1990
- Genres: Platformer, shoot 'em up
- Mode: Single-player

Xexyz (pronounced /ˈzɛksɪz, -iːz/ ZEKS-iz, -eez), known in Japan as Kame no Ongaeshi - Urashima Densetsu (亀の恩返し〜ウラシマ伝説〜, Turtle's Repayment: Urashima Legend), is a 1988 video game published by Hudson Soft for the Nintendo Entertainment System. The game was released in Japan on August 26, 1988, and saw a North American release sometime in April 1990. The game was never released in Europe and the game is not playable on PAL consoles.

The story takes place in the post-apocalyptic year of 2777, after Earth has been devastated by nuclear war and natural disasters, with the island nation of Xexyz now being threatened by alien robots.

The Japanese Famicom version is based on the tales of Urashima Tarō, features cutscenes throughout the game, a choice of three endings and has graphical differences in some of the NPCs.

== Gameplay ==
The game revolves around the main character Apollo, who progresses through the game in an alternating format that switches between platform, side-scrolling action (similar to the Super Mario Bros. series) and side-scrolling shooter action (similar to Konami's Gradius series). The goal of the game is to destroy the evil Goruza, rescue Princess Maria, and save the planet.

In the platforming levels, defeated enemies drop life ('L' blocks) or money ('E' blocks) power-ups. Apollo can collect the currency of the land ('Balls'/'E Ball') in order to exchange it for power-ups and information, as well as access to minigames. Vendors are scattered throughout the platforming levels through doors or hidden gates. In the shooter levels, the player can obtain 'S' and 'P' items that upgrade speed and weapons, respectively.

The first platformer area of Xexyz

=== Platformer gameplay ===
The odd-numbered stages in the game (1, 3, 5, etc.) utilize mostly platform-style gameplay. These stages work in the familiar manner; the character progresses at his/her own pace, picking up new weapons and power-ups along the way. To leave the initial area of each of these levels the player has to collect a "force star" by defeating an enemy found in a hidden room. Once this star is obtained the character is able to enter the "mechanical castle" in the region. The mechanical castles, being mazelike indoor environments full of robots and machines, stand in stark contrast to the earlier parts of each level, which are organic outdoor environments. Each mechanical castle also has a brief auto-scrolling shooter segment through which the player must pass; these segments foreshadow the imminent transition to the following even-numbered stages. The segments in question consist of a sequence of corridors, at the end of which are two doors; choosing the wrong door loops the player back. Finally, at the very end of each mechanical castle, there is a door leading to a boss fight. The boss fights are set against a solid black background and Apollo must fight while standing on a controllable floating platform.

=== Side-scrolling shooter gameplay ===
For the even-numbered stages (2, 4, 6, etc.) the character is prompted to jump into a vehicle (a different one each time) and take part in an auto-scrolling Gradius-like level ending with a boss fight.

=== Boss fights ===
In the transition area after the platform-style levels, prior to the boss fight, Apollo is prompted to jump on a platform that lets him float. After moving into a previously out-of-reach door, the fight begins.

In side-scrolling shooter areas, the player simply appears in a boss area in the ship they played the level in.

The fights consist of a black area where the player fights a giant robot/ship. Their attack pattern, resembling that of a manic shooter, is repetitive and avoidable; the player shoots the boss with either their conventional weapon or the in-ship weapon.

=== Tube Shooter gameplay ===
The final level is a "fixed" shooter. More specifically, it is a "tube shooter" where the player approaches the last boss's fortress and attempts to destroy it. Apollo, in a more enhanced ship than any seen before, rotates from the sides of the screen to the bottom, shooting at the center while avoiding enemy fire.

=== Weapons and items ===
Apollo receives weapons and items from a goddess character to help him on his way. All weapons can be powered up by visiting a shop that specializes in powering up weapons, or by talking to the goddess character a second time.

== Reception ==
Reception

Review scores
Publication	Score
AllGame	3.5/5
Electronic Gaming Monthly	7/10, 7/10, 6/10, 6/10
Nintendo Power	14/20
VideoGames & Computer Entertainment	6/10

Xexyz was met with generally positive reception from critics, but public reception in Japan was mixed; in a poll taken by Family Computer Magazine, it received a score of 18.38 out of 30.
