= List of Sunsoft video games =

This is a list of video games developed or released by Sunsoft.

== Video games ==
| Title | Release date | System | Note |
|---|---|---|---|
| Block Challenger | 1978 | Arcade | Also known as Block Perfect or Galaxy Force |
| Dai San Wakusei | 1979 | Arcade | Also known as Third Planet |
| Run Away | 1979 | Arcade | |
| Warp-1 | 1979 | Arcade | |
| Cosmopolis | 1980 | Arcade | |
| Stratovox | 1980 | Arcade | Also known as Speak & Rescue |
| Funky Fish | 1981 | Arcade | |
| Route-16 | 1981 | Arcade | |
| Kangaroo | 1982 | Arcade | |
| Arabian | 1983 | Arcade | |
| Markham | 1983 | Arcade | Japan-only |
| Pettan Pyuu | 1984 | Arcade | Japan-only |
| Strength & Skill - Guinness Book of Records | 1984 | Arcade | |
| Ikki | 1985 | Arcade | |
| Ikki | November 28, 1985 | Nintendo Entertainment System | |
| Super Arabian | July 25, 1985 | Nintendo Entertainment System | Japan-only |
| Route-16 Turbo | October 4, 1985 | Nintendo Entertainment System | Japan-only |
| Atlantis no Nazo | April 17, 1986 | Nintendo Entertainment System | Japan-only |
| Firework Thrower Kantaro's 53 Stations of the Tokaido | July 3, 1986 | Nintendo Entertainment System | Japan-only |
| Dead Zone | November 20, 1986 | Famicom Disk System | |
| Adian no Tsue | December 12, 1986 | Famicom Disk System | |
| The Wing of Madoola | December 18, 1986 | Nintendo Entertainment System | Japan-only |
| Super Sky Kid/VS. Sky Kid | 1986 | Nintendo VS. System | USA-only; developed by Namco |
| Nazoler Land | February 6, 1987 | Famicom Disk System | |
| Marchen Veil | March 3, 1987 | Famicom Disk System | Original version developed and released by System Sacom for the MSX |
| Chitei Tairiku Orudoora | March 27, 1987 | Famicom Disk System | |
| Super Boy Allan | March 27, 1987 | Famicom Disk System | Developed by Asmik |
| Nazoler Land Dai 2 Gou | June 12, 1987 | Famicom Disk System | |
| Fantasy Zone | July 20, 1987 | Nintendo Entertainment System | Japan-only; under license from Sega |
| Tenka no Goikenban: Mito Koumon (天下の御意見番 水戸黄門) | August 11, 1987 | Nintendo Entertainment System | |
| Sky Kid | September 1987 | Nintendo Entertainment System | USA-only |
| Spy Hunter | September 1987 | Nintendo Entertainment System | USA-only |
| Shanghai | December 4, 1987 | Nintendo Entertainment System | Japan-only |
| Nazoler Land Special | December 18, 1987 | Famicom Disk System | |
| Ripple Island | January 23, 1988 | Nintendo Entertainment System | |
| Nazoler Land Dai 3 Gou | March 11, 1988 | Famicom Disk System | |
| Freedom Force | April 1988 | Nintendo Entertainment System | USA-only |
| Freedom Force | 1988 | Nintendo VS. System | USA-only |
| Blaster Master | June 17, 1988 | Nintendo Entertainment System | Known as Chō Wakusei Senki Metafight (超惑星戦記 メタファイト) in Japan |
| Mito Koumon II: Sekai Manyuu Ki (水戸黄門II 世界漫遊記) | August 11, 1988 | Nintendo Entertainment System | Japan-only |
| Alien Syndrome | December 2, 1988 | Nintendo Entertainment System | Japan-only |
| Nankin no Adventure | December 9, 1988 | Famicom Disk System | |
| Fantasy Zone II: Opa-Opa no Namida (ファンタジーゾーンII オパオパの涙) | December 20, 1988 | Nintendo Entertainment System | Japan-only |
| Xenophobe | December 1988 | Nintendo Entertainment System | USA-only |
| Platoon | December 1988 | Nintendo Entertainment System | USA-only |
| Platoon | 1988 | Nintendo VS. System | USA-only |
| Shanghai | 1988 | Arcade | |
| Sekiryuuou (赤龍王) | February 10, 1989 | Nintendo Entertainment System | Japan-only |
| Out Live | March 17, 1989 | PC Engine | |
| After Burner (アフターバーナー) | March 30, 1989 | Nintendo Entertainment System | Japan-only |
| Maharaja (マハラジャ) | September 29, 1989 | Nintendo Entertainment System | Japan-only |
| Fester's Quest | September 1989 | Nintendo Entertainment System | |
| Benkei Gaiden | December 22, 1989 | PC Engine | |
| Batman | December 22, 1989 | Nintendo Entertainment System | |
| Bay Route | 1989 | Arcade | Sunsoft / Sega |
| Shanghai II | 1989 | Arcade | |
| Tough Turf | 1989 | Arcade | |
| City Hunter | March 2, 1990 | PC Engine/TurboGrafx-16 | |
| Batman | April 13, 1990 | Game Boy | Rereleased in 1997 in North America with an updated company address on the box art and booklet. |
| Tel-Tel Mahjong | June 8, 1990 | Genesis | Japan-only |
| Batman | July 19, 1990 | Genesis | |
| Journey to Silius | August 10, 1990 | Nintendo Entertainment System | Known as Rough World (ラフワールド) in Japan |
| Shanghai II (上海II) | August 24, 1990 | Nintendo Entertainment System | Japan-only |
| Batman | October 12, 1990 | PC Engine | Japan-only |
| Tel-Tel Stadium | October 21, 1990 | Genesis | Japan-only |
| Nantettatte!! Baseball (なんてったって！！ベースボール) | October 26, 1990 | Nintendo Entertainment System | Japan-only |
| Pri Pri: Primitive Princess! | December 12, 1990 | Game Boy | |
| Gremlins 2: The New Batch | October 1990 | Nintendo Entertainment System | Known as Gremlins 2: Shinshu Tanjou (グレムリン2 新種誕生) in Japan. Game Boy version rereleased in 1997 in North America with an updated company address on the box art and booklet. |
| Gremlins 2: The New Batch | December 21, 1990 | Game Boy | Known as Gremlins 2: Shinshu Tanjou (グレムリン2 新種誕生) in Japan. Game Boy version rereleased in 1997 in North America with an updated company address on the box art and booklet. |
| Blaster Master Jr. | August 23, 1991 | Game Boy | Known as Blaster Master Boy in North America and Bomber King: Scenario 2 (ボンバーキング シナリオ2) in Japan |
| Ufouria: The Saga | September 20, 1991 | Nintendo Entertainment System | Known as Hebereke (へべれけ) in Japan |
| Super Spy Hunter | September 27, 1991 | Nintendo Entertainment System | Known as Battle Formula (バトルフォーミュラ) in Japan |
| Lemmings | December 18, 1991 | Super Nintendo Entertainment System | |
| Lemmings | November 20, 1992 | Genesis | |
| Lemmings | November 1992 | Nintendo Entertainment System | Developed by Ocean Software |
| Batman: Return of the Joker | December 20, 1991 | Nintendo Entertainment System | Known as Dynamite Batman (ダイナマイトバットマン) in Japan. Game Boy version rereleased in 1997 in North America with an updated company address on the box art and booklet. |
| Batman: Return of the Joker | March 28, 1992 | Game Boy | Known as Dynamite Batman (ダイナマイトバットマン) in Japan. Game Boy version rereleased in 1997 in North America with an updated company address on the box art and booklet. |
| Batman: Revenge of the Joker | 1992 | Genesis | |
| Super Fantasy Zone | January 14, 1992 | Genesis | |
| Gimmick! (ギミック！) | January 31, 1992 | Nintendo Entertainment System | Known as Mr. Gimmick outside of Japan |
| Honoo no Toukyuuji: Dodge Danpei (炎の闘球児 ドッジ弾平) | March 28, 1992 | Nintendo Entertainment System | Japan-only |
| Looney Tunes | October 1992 | Game Boy | Known as Looney Tunes: Bugs Bunny to Yukai na Nakama Tachi in Japan. Rereleased in 1997 in North America with an updated company address on the box art and booklet. |
| Looney Tunes | September 1999 | Game Boy Color | Not to be confused with the 1997 reprint of the game on the original Game Boy. |
| Trip World | November 27, 1992 | Game Boy | Japan-only |
| Firepower 2000 | November 1992 | Super Nintendo Entertainment System | Super SWIV in Europe, original design by Sales Curve Interactive |
| Road Runner's Death Valley Rally | November 1992 | Super Nintendo Entertainment System | Developed by ICOM Simulations |
| Benkei Gaiden: Suna no Shou | December 11, 1992 | Super Nintendo Entertainment System | Japan-only |
| Barcode World (バーコードワールド) | December 18, 1992 | Nintendo Entertainment System | Japan-only |
| Superman | 1992 | Genesis | |
| Albert Odyssey | March 5, 1993 | Super Nintendo Entertainment System | Japan-only |
| Pyokotan no Dai Meiro (ぴょこたんの大迷路) | March 19, 1993 | Nintendo Entertainment System | Japan-only, developed by Japan System Supply |
| Honoo no Toukyuuji: Dodge Danpei 2 (炎の闘球児 ドッジ弾平2) | March 26, 1993 | Nintendo Entertainment System | Japan-only |
| Taz-Mania | May 1993 | Super Nintendo Entertainment System | Developed by Visual Concepts |
| Speedy Gonzales | July 1993 | Game Boy | |
| World Heroes (video game) | August 12, 1993 | Super Nintendo Entertainment System | |
| Aero the Acro-Bat | August 1, 1993 | Genesis | Developed by Iguana Entertainment |
| Aero the Acro-Bat | October 12, 1993 | Super Nintendo Entertainment System | Developed by Iguana Entertainment |
| Daffy Duck: The Marvin Missions | October 1993 | Super Nintendo Entertainment System | Developed by ICOM Simulations |
| Super Air Diver | November 1993 | Super Nintendo Entertainment System | PAL regions only |
| Flashback | December 22, 1993 | Super Nintendo Entertainment System | Japanese publisher |
| Hebereke's Popoon | December 22, 1993 | Super Nintendo Entertainment System | |
| Hebereke's Popoon | 1994 | Arcade | |
| Blaster Master 2 | 1993 | Genesis | Developed by Software Creations |
| Beauty & the Beast: Belle's Quest | 1993 | Genesis | Developed by Software Creations |
| Beauty & the Beast: Roar of the Beast | 1993 | Genesis | Developed by Software Creations |
| Oishii Puzzle Ha Irimasenka | 1993 | Arcade | Sunsoft + Atlus |
| Barcode Battler: Saikyou Battler Retsuden | September 1993 | Arcade | Sunsoft / Epoch |
| Shanghai III | 1993 | Arcade | Developed by Success |
| Bugs Bunny Rabbit Rampage | February 1994 | Super Nintendo Entertainment System | Developed by Viacom New Media |
| Sugoi Hebereke | March 11, 1994 | Super Nintendo Entertainment System | |
| Hebereke no Oishii Puzzle | August 31, 1994 | Super Nintendo Entertainment System | |
| Hashire Hebereke | December 22, 1994 | Super Nintendo Entertainment System | |
| Aero the Acro-Bat 2 | December 1994 | Genesis | Developed by Iguana Entertainment |
| Aero the Acro-Bat 2 | December 1994 | Super Nintendo Entertainment System | Developed by Iguana Entertainment |
| Albert Odyssey 2 | 1994 | Super Nintendo Entertainment System | Japan-only |
| Bubble and Squeak | 1994 | Genesis | |
| Taz-Mania | September 1994 | Game Boy | Rereleased in 1997 in North America with an updated company address on the box art and booklet. |
| Daffy Duck: The Marvin Missions | September 1994 | Game Boy | Rereleased in 1997 in North America with an updated company address on the box art and booklet. |
| Daze Before Christmas | 1994 | Genesis | PAL regions only |
| Daze Before Christmas | 1994 | Super Nintendo Entertainment System | PAL regions only |
| Deae Tonosama Appare Ichiban | 1994 | Super Nintendo Entertainment System | Japan-only |
| The Death and Return of Superman | 1994 | Super Nintendo Entertainment System | Developed by Blizzard Entertainment |
| The Death and Return of Superman | 1995 | Genesis | Developed by Blizzard Entertainment |
| Hissatsu Pachinko Collection | 1994 | Super Nintendo Entertainment System | Japan-only |
| Panorama Cotton | 1994 | Genesis | Developed by Success Corp. |
| Acme Animation Factory | November 1994 | Super Nintendo Entertainment System | Developed by Probe Software |
| Myst | 1994 | Sega Saturn | |
| Pirates of Dark Water | 1994 | Genesis | |
| Pirates of Dark Water | 1994 | Super Nintendo Entertainment System | |
| Shounen Ninja Sasuke | 1994 | Super Nintendo Entertainment System | Japan-only |
| Yogi Bear's Gold Rush | 1994 | Game Boy | Published in Europe |
| Zero the Kamikaze Squirrel | 1994 | Genesis | Developed by Iguana Entertainment |
| Zero the Kamikaze Squirrel | 1994 | Super Nintendo Entertainment System | Developed by Iguana Entertainment |
| Hungry Dinosaurs | January 1995 | Super Nintendo Entertainment System | Published in Europe |
| Galaxy Fight: Universal Warriors | January 24, 1995 | Arcade, Neo Geo | |
| Galaxy Fight: Universal Warriors | November 22, 1995 | Sega Saturn | |
| Galaxy Fight: Universal Warriors | April 30, 1996 | PlayStation | |
| Hebereke's Popoitto | March 3, 1995 | Sega Saturn | Developed by Success Corporation |
| Hebereke's Popoitto | May 26, 1995 | PlayStation | Developed by Success Corporation |
| Hebereke's Popoitto | July 28, 1995 | Super Nintendo Entertainment System | |
| Justice League Task Force | 1995 | Genesis | Licensed to and published by Acclaim Entertainment |
| Justice League Task Force | June 1995 | Super Nintendo Entertainment System | Licensed to and published by Acclaim Entertainment |
| O-Chan no Oekaki Logic | September 8, 1995 | PlayStation | |
| O-Chan no Oekaki Logic | November 17, 1995 | Sega Saturn | |
| O-Chan no Oekaki Logic | December 1, 1995 | Super Nintendo Entertainment System | |
| Looney Tunes B-Ball | 1995 | Super Nintendo Entertainment System | Developed by Sculptured Software |
| Porky Pig's Haunted Holiday | 1995 | Super Nintendo Entertainment System | Developed by Dark Technologies. Licensed to and published by Acclaim Entertainment |
| Scooby-Doo Mystery | 1995 | Genesis | Developed by The Illusions Gaming Company. Licensed to and published by Acclaim Entertainment |
| Scooby-Doo Mystery | 1995 | Super Nintendo Entertainment System | Developed by Argonaut Software. Licensed to and published by Acclaim Entertainment |
| Shanghai - The Great Wall / Shanghai Triple Threat | 1995 | Arcade | Sunsoft / Activision |
| Speedy Gonzales: Los Gatos Bandidos | 1995 | Super Nintendo Entertainment System | Developed by Dark Technologies. North America-only, licensed to and published by Acclaim Entertainment |
| O-Chan no Oekaki Logic 2 | September 27, 1996 | PlayStation | |
| O-Chan no Oekaki Logic 2 | January 6, 2000 | WonderSwan | |
| Albert Odyssey: Legend of Eldean | 1996 | Sega Saturn | |
| Karaoke Quiz Intro Don Don! | 1996 | Arcade | Sunsoft / Success |
| Waku Waku 7 | November 1996 | Arcade, Neo Geo | |
| Waku Waku 7 | June 20, 1997 | Sega Saturn | |
| The Note (公開されなかった手記, Koukai Sarenakatta Shuki) | October 1, 1997 | PlayStation | Japan / EU release only |
| Chameleon Twist | 1997 | Nintendo 64 | |
| Riven | 1997 | PlayStation | |
| Riven | 1998 | Sega Saturn | |
| Out Live: Be Eliminate Yesterday | 1997 | PlayStation | |
| Amagi Shien | February 14, 1997 | Sega Saturn, PC | Japan-only; Developed by Success. Published by Clip House, which shared the same contact address as Sunsoft back in 1997. |
| Photo Genic | December 18, 1997 | PlayStation | |
| Photo Genic | January 29, 1998 | Sega Saturn | |
| Astra Superstars | June 6, 1998 | Arcade | |
| Astra Superstars | August 6, 1998 | Sega Saturn | |
| Aerostar | 1998 | Game Boy | USA-only; Re-release of a Vic Tokai title from 1991 |
| BurgerTime Deluxe | 1998 | Game Boy | USA-only; Re-release of a Data East title from 1991 |
| Daedalian Opus | 1998 | Game Boy | USA-only; Re-release of a Vic Tokai title from 1990 |
| Darkwing Duck | 1998 | Game Boy | USA-only; Re-release of a Capcom title from 1993 |
| Final Fantasy Adventure | 1998 | Game Boy | USA-only; Re-release of a Square title from 1991 |
| The Final Fantasy Legend | 1998 | Game Boy | USA-only; Re-release of a Square title from 1990 |
| Final Fantasy Legend II | 1998 | Game Boy | USA-only; Re-release of a Square title from 1991 |
| Final Fantasy Legend III | 1998 | Game Boy | USA-only; Re-release of a Square title from 1993 |
| Lock 'n' Chase | 1998 | Game Boy | USA-only; Re-release of a Data East title from 1990 |
| Side Pocket | 1998 | Game Boy | USA-only; Re-release of a Data East title from 1990 |
| Talespin | 1998 | Game Boy | USA-only; Re-release of a Capcom title from 1992 |
| Tumblepop | 1998 | Game Boy | USA-only; Re-release of a Data East title from 1993 |
| Turrican | 1998 | Game Boy | USA-only; Re-release of a Accolade title from 1991 |
| Who Framed Roger Rabbit | 1998 | Game Boy | USA-only; Re-release of a Capcom title from 1991 |
| Maui Mallard in Cold Shadow | 1998 | Game Boy | USA-only |
| Monster Seed | 1998 | PlayStation | |
| Power Quest | 1998 | Game Boy Color | Developed by Japan System Supply |
| Shanghai: Matekibuyu | 1998 | Arcade | Sunsoft / Activision |
| Shanghai: True Valor | 1998 | PlayStation | |
| Shanghai Pocket | 1998 | Game Boy Color | |
| Hard Edge | 1998 | PlayStation | Known as Hard Edge in North America |
| Puzzle Bobble | 1999 | Wonderswan | Japan-only |
| Logical | 1999 | Game Boy Color | |
| Puma Street Soccer | 1999 | PlayStation | |
| Chameleon Twist 2 | April 14, 1999 | Nintendo 64 | |
| Wonder-B Cruise | October 7, 1999 | PlayStation | |
| Tasmanian Devil: Munching Madness | November 1999 | Game Boy Color | |
| Daffy Duck: Fowl Play | December 1999 | Game Boy Color | |
| Eternal Eyes | December 2, 1999 | PlayStation | |
| Yeh Yeh Tennis | December 22, 1999 | PlayStation | Known as Love Game's: Wai Wai Tennis 2 (ラブゲームス わいわいテニス2) in Japan |
| Speedy Gonzales: Aztec Adventure | December 26, 1999 | Game Boy Color | |
| Blaster Master: Enemy Below | 2000 | Game Boy Color | Known as Metafight EX (メタファイトEX) in Japan |
| Blaster Master: Blasting Again | 2000 | PlayStation | Known as Blaster Master in Japan |
| Initial D: Takahashi Ryosuke no Typing Saisoku Riron | July 28, 2000 | PlayStation 2 | |
| Monkey Magic | 2000 | PlayStation | |
| Moomin's Tale | 2000 | Game Boy Color | |
| Quest: Brian's Journey | 2000 | Game Boy Color | |
| Real Myst | 2000 | PC | Also stylized as realMyst. Developed by Cyan |
| O-Chan no Oekaki Logic 3 | January 11, 2001 | PlayStation | |
| Barbapapa | 2001 | PlayStation | |
| Project S-11 | 2001 | Game Boy Color | |
| Memorial Series: Sunsoft Vol. 1 (Ikki / Super Arabian) | October 4, 2001 | PlayStation | |
| Memorial Series: Sunsoft Vol. 2 (Atlantis no Nazo / Route-16 Turbo) | December 6, 2001 | PlayStation | |
| Shanghai Advance | December 14, 2001 | Game Boy Advance | |
| Memorial Series: Sunsoft Vol. 3 (Tōkaidō Gojūsan-tsugi / The Wing of Madoola) | December 27, 2001 | PlayStation | |
| Memorial Series: Sunsoft Vol. 4 (Blaster Master / Ripple Island) | February 14, 2002 | PlayStation | |
| Memorial Series: Sunsoft Vol. 5 (Journey to Silius / Ufouria: The Saga) | March 28, 2002 | PlayStation | |
| Memorial Series: Sunsoft Vol. 6 (Gimmick! / Super Spy Hunter) | November 21, 2002 | PlayStation | |
| Ikki Mobile (いっき萌バイル) | July 2006 | Mobile phone | Remake of Famicom game |
| Blaster Master: Overdrive | February 8, 2010 | Wii | |
| Ikki Online (いっき おんらいん) | June 29, 2010 | PlayStation 3 | Remake of Famicom game |
| Clock Tower | August 3, 2010 | Virtual Console (Wii) | Japan-only |
| Clock Tower | November 6, 2013 | Virtual Console (Wii U) | Japan-only |
| Shanghai 3D Cube | March 3, 2011 | Nintendo 3DS | |
| Ikki ~ Min'nade Komesōdō (いっき～みんなで米騒動～) | March 8, 2011 | Mobile phone | |
| Clock Tower: The First Fear | November 9, 2011 | PlayStation Store (PSP/PS3/PSVita) | Japan-only |
| Clock Tower 2 | February 22, 2012 | PlayStation Store (PSP/PS3/PSVita) | Japan-only |
| Clock Tower: Ghost Head | May 9, 2012 | PlayStation Store (PSP/PS3/PSVita) | Japan-only |
| Shanghai | 2017 | Mobile phone | |
| Obduction | June 28, 2018 | PlayStation 4 | Developed by Cyan Worlds. Provided Japanese localization |
| Dark Eclipse | September 25, 2018 | PlayStation VR | Published in Europe by Sony Interactive Entertainment Europe (SIEE). |
| Shanghai Refresh | November 29, 2018 | Nintendo Switch | |
| Alba: A Wildlife Adventure | 2021 | Nintendo Switch | |
| House Cleaning Survival | May 31, 2021 | Windows, Nintendo Switch | |
| Ikki Unite | February 15, 2023 | Windows, Nintendo Switch | |
| Trip World DX | November 30, 2023 | Nintendo Switch, Windows, PlayStation 4, PlayStation 5 | |
| Ufouria: The Saga 2 | March 1, 2024 | Nintendo Switch, Microsoft Windows, PlayStation 5, Xbox Series X|S | |
| SUNSOFT is Back! Retro Game Selection | April 18, 2024 | Windows, Nintendo Switch, PlayStation 5, Xbox Series X | Includes The Wing of Madoola, Tōkaidō Gojūsan-tsugi (Firework Thrower Kantaro's 53 Stations of the Tokaido), and Ripple Island. |
| Ark of Charon | July 2024 | Windows | |
| Gimmick! 2 | September 2024 | Windows, Nintendo Switch, PlayStation 4, PlayStation 5, Xbox One, Xbox Series X and Series S | |

=== Cancelled ===
| Title | System |
|---|---|
| Lionex | Nintendo VS. System |
| Magic Flute | Nintendo 64 |
| Pescatore | Famicom |
| Sunman | Nintendo Entertainment System |
| Wile E. Coyote's Revenge | Super Nintendo Entertainment System |
