= List of Virtual Console games for Nintendo 3DS =

This is a list of Virtual Console games that were available for purchase on the Nintendo 3DS via the Nintendo eShop. As of March 27, 2023, the Nintendo 3DS eShop has closed and all games are no longer available for download.

== Available titles ==
In total, 315 Virtual Console games were released for the Nintendo 3DS across all regions. Of these games, 294 were released in Japan, 203 were released in North America, and 199 were released in PAL regions.

=== Game Boy ===
A total of 74 Game Boy games (Note: 72 games in Japan, 51 games in North America, 50 games in PAL regions) were available to purchase. Select games were delisted from purchase prior to the eShop's closure.

Title	Publisher	JP Release Date	NA Release Date	PAL Release Date
Adventure Island	Hudson Soft/Konami	July 13, 2011	December 1, 2011	November 3, 2011
Alleyway	Nintendo	August 3, 2011	June 6, 2011	June 7, 2011
Avenging Spirit	Jaleco	June 7, 2011	August 11, 2011	August 11, 2011
Balloon Kid	Nintendo	Unreleased	November 3, 2011	January 26, 2012
Baseball	Nintendo	June 7, 2011	July 14, 2011	July 28, 2011
Bikkuri Nekketsu Shin Kiroku! Dokodemo Kin Medal	Arc System Works	November 9, 2011	Unreleased	Unreleased
Bionic Commando	Capcom	November 16, 2011	December 29, 2011	December 29, 2011
Bomberman GB 3	Konami	July 11, 2012	Unreleased	Unreleased
BurgerTime Deluxe	G-Mode	September 14, 2011	October 27, 2011	October 27, 2011
Castlevania: The Adventure	Konami	March 14, 2012	October 25, 2012	July 5, 2012
Catrap	ASK	July 27, 2011	October 13, 2011	October 6, 2011
Downtown Nekketsu Kōshinkyoku: Dokodemo Daiundōkai	Arc System Works	May 16, 2012	Unreleased	Unreleased
Downtown Special: Kunio-kun no Jidaigeki da yo Zenin Shūgō!	Arc System Works	June 7, 2011	Unreleased	Unreleased
Donkey Kong	Nintendo	June 15, 2011	June 16, 2011	June 16, 2011
Donkey Kong Land	Nintendo	April 2, 2014	February 26, 2015	October 16, 2014
Donkey Kong Land 2	Nintendo	April 16, 2014	February 26, 2015	October 23, 2014
Donkey Kong Land III	Nintendo	Unreleased (Note: Released as a Game Boy Color game in Japan.)	February 26, 2015	October 30, 2014
Double Dragon	Arc System Works	June 22, 2011	October 20, 2011	June 23, 2011
Double Dragon II	Arc System Works	August 8, 2012	Unreleased	Unreleased
Dr. Mario	Nintendo	July 27, 2011	October 4, 2012	March 22, 2012
Fortified Zone	Jaleco	June 15, 2011	July 7, 2011	July 7, 2011 (Note: Released in Australia on July 28, 2011)
Fortified Zone 2	Hamster	January 11, 2012	Unreleased	Unreleased
Game & Watch Gallery	Nintendo	June 22, 2011	July 14, 2011	July 21, 2011
Game & Watch Gallery 2	Nintendo	March 21, 2012	Unreleased (Note: Released as a Game Boy Color game in the United States and PAL regions.)	Unreleased
Ganbare Goemon: Sarawareta Ebisumaru!	Konami	June 27, 2012	Unreleased	Unreleased
Gargoyle's Quest	Capcom	June 29, 2011	August 25, 2011	August 25, 2011
Golf	Nintendo	June 29, 2011	September 8, 2011	October 13, 2011
Heracles no Eikō: Ugokidashita Kamigami	Paon	August 24, 2011	Unreleased	Unreleased
Kaeru no Tame ni Kane wa Naru	Nintendo	September 5, 2012	Unreleased	Unreleased
Kid Icarus: Of Myths and Monsters	Nintendo	February 8, 2012	July 19, 2012	March 8, 2012
Kirby's Block Ball	Nintendo	October 26, 2011	May 17, 2012	February 9, 2012
Kirby's Dream Land	Nintendo	June 7, 2011	June 30, 2011	June 30, 2011
Kirby's Dream Land 2	Nintendo	February 15, 2012	August 1, 2013	May 17, 2012
Kirby's Pinball Land	Nintendo	August 29, 2012	July 12, 2012	July 26, 2012
Kirby's Star Stacker	Nintendo	May 23, 2012	January 17, 2013	August 30, 2012
Lock 'n' Chase	G-Mode	November 2, 2011	January 19, 2012	December 1, 2011
Mario's Picross	Nintendo	September 21, 2011	August 4, 2011	July 14, 2011
Maru's Mission	Hamster	January 18, 2012	February 9, 2012	Unreleased
Mega Man: Dr. Wily's Revenge	Capcom	June 7, 2011	September 15, 2011	September 15, 2011
Mega Man II	Capcom	September 25, 2013	May 8, 2014	August 7, 2014
Mega Man III	Capcom	October 9, 2013	May 8, 2014	August 14, 2014
Mega Man IV	Capcom	October 23, 2013	May 15, 2014	August 21, 2014
Mega Man V	Capcom	November 6, 2013	May 22, 2014	August 28, 2014
Metroid II: Return of Samus	Nintendo	September 28, 2011	November 24, 2011	November 24, 2011
Mole Mania	Nintendo	November 7, 2012	July 26, 2012	October 4, 2012
Mystical Ninja Starring Goemon	Konami	March 7, 2012	September 13, 2012	August 16, 2012
Nekketsu Kōkō Dodgeball Bu: Kyōteki! Dōkyū Senshi no Maki	Arc System Works	August 3, 2011	Unreleased	Unreleased
Nekketsu! Beach Volley da yo: Kunio-kun	Arc System Works	January 25, 2012	Unreleased	Unreleased
Nekojara Monogatari	Kemco	July 25, 2012	Unreleased	Unreleased
Nintendo World Cup	Arc System Works	August 1, 2012	Unreleased	Unreleased
Pac-Man (Note: Delisted on April 28, 2017.)	Bandai Namco Entertainment	July 7, 2011	September 1, 2011	August 4, 2011
Panel de Pon	Nintendo	December 11, 2013	Unreleased	Unreleased
Picross 2	Nintendo	October 24, 2012	Unreleased	Unreleased
Pokémon Blue	Nintendo	February 27, 2016	February 27, 2016	February 27, 2016
Pokémon Green	Nintendo	February 27, 2016	Unreleased	Unreleased
Pokémon Yellow	Nintendo	February 27, 2016	Unreleased	Unreleased
Pokémon Red	Nintendo	February 27, 2016	February 27, 2016	February 27, 2016
Pri Pri: Primitive Princess!	Sunsoft	July 18, 2012	Unreleased	Unreleased
Qix	Nintendo	June 15, 2011	July 7, 2011	July 7, 2011
Quarth	Konami	February 22, 2012	September 27, 2012	Unreleased
Radar Mission	Nintendo	October 5, 2011	June 6, 2011	June 23, 2011
Revenge of the 'Gator	HAL Laboratory	January 9, 2013	October 17, 2013	September 5, 2013
Side Pocket	G-Mode	September 7, 2011	October 6, 2011	November 10, 2011
Super Mario Land	Nintendo	June 7, 2011	June 6, 2011	June 7, 2011
Super Mario Land 2: 6 Golden Coins	Nintendo	October 12, 2011	September 29, 2011	September 29, 2011
The Sword of Hope	Kemco	December 7, 2011	Unreleased	Unreleased
The Sword of Hope II	Kemco	June 13, 2012	July 12, 2012	August 9, 2012
Tennis	Nintendo	July 20, 2011	June 23, 2011	June 7, 2011
Tetris (Note: Delisted on January 1, 2015.)	Nintendo	December 28, 2011	December 22, 2011	December 22, 2011
Tumblepop	G-Mode	April 11, 2012	July 19, 2012	June 7, 2012
Trip World	Sunsoft	November 30, 2011	Unreleased	January 5, 2012
TwinBee Da!!	Konami	June 20, 2012	Unreleased	Unreleased
Wario Land: Super Mario Land 3	Nintendo	December 14, 2011	July 26, 2012	February 16, 2012
Zoids Densetsu	Takara Tomy	August 31, 2011	Unreleased	Unreleased

=== Game Boy Color ===
A total of 39 GBC games (Note: 25 games in Japan, 31 games in North America, 29 games in PAL regions) were available to purchase. In Japan, two games were only available as part of special promotions.

Title	Publisher	JP Release Date	NA Release Date	PAL Release Date
Balloon Fight GB	Nintendo	October 19, 2011	Unreleased	Unreleased
Bionic Commando: Elite Forces	Nintendo	Unreleased	January 1, 2015	November 13, 2014
Blaster Master: Enemy Below	Sunsoft	November 22, 2011	December 15, 2011	December 8, 2011
Donkey Kong Land III	Nintendo	May 7, 2014	Unreleased (Note: Released as a Game Boy game in the United States and PAL regions.)	Unreleased
Game & Watch Gallery 2	Nintendo	Unreleased (Note: Released as a Game Boy game in Japan.)	May 24, 2012	May 3, 2012
Game & Watch Gallery 3	Nintendo	November 21, 2014 (Note: Available exclusively to users who registered Super Smash Bros. for Nintendo 3DS and one of Pokémon Omega Ruby or Pokémon Alpha Sapphire on the Japanese Club Nintendo between November 21, 2014 and January 20, 2015.)	February 5, 2015	September 25, 2014
Harvest Moon	Natsume Inc.	Unreleased	May 16, 2013	March 28, 2013
Harvest Moon 2	Natsume Inc.	Unreleased	October 16, 2014	Unreleased
Harvest Moon 3	Natsume Inc.	Unreleased	December 11, 2014	Unreleased
Koto Battle: Tengai no Moribito (Note: Delisted on October 31, 2019.)	AlphaDream	May 30, 2012	Unreleased	Unreleased
Legend of the River King	Natsume Inc.	Unreleased	March 28, 2013	March 7, 2013
Legend of the River King 2	Natsume Inc.	Unreleased	September 18, 2014	October 23, 2014
The Legend of Zelda: Link's Awakening DX	Nintendo	June 8, 2011	June 7, 2011	June 8, 2011
The Legend of Zelda: Oracle of Ages	Nintendo	February 27, 2013	May 30, 2013	May 30, 2013
The Legend of Zelda: Oracle of Seasons	Nintendo	February 27, 2013	May 30, 2013	May 30, 2013
Lufia: The Legend Returns	Natsume Inc.	Unreleased	January 15, 2015	November 20, 2014
Mario Golf	Nintendo	October 3, 2012	October 11, 2012 (Note: Initially available for free to users who purchased Mario Golf: World Tour on the Nintendo eShop from May 2–29, 2014.)	May 29, 2014
Mario Tennis	Nintendo	June 26, 2013	December 26, 2013	January 2, 2014
Mega Man Xtreme	Capcom	December 4, 2013	May 1, 2014	September 4, 2014
Mega Man Xtreme 2	Capcom	December 25, 2013	May 29, 2014	September 11, 2014
Megami Tensei Gaiden: Last Bible II	Atlus	September 12, 2012	Unreleased	Unreleased
Prince of Persia	Ubisoft	Unreleased	June 7, 2012	January 19, 2012
Pokémon Crystal	Nintendo	January 26, 2018	January 26, 2018	January 26, 2018
Pokémon Gold	Nintendo	September 22, 2017	September 22, 2017	September 22, 2017
Pokémon Puzzle Challenge	Nintendo	Unreleased	November 6, 2014	November 27, 2014
Pokémon Silver	Nintendo	September 22, 2017	September 22, 2017	September 22, 2017
Pokémon Trading Card Game	Nintendo	December 24, 2014	November 13, 2014	November 10, 2014
Pokémon Yellow	Nintendo	Unreleased	February 27, 2016	February 27, 2016
Rayman	Ubisoft	July 25, 2012	May 31, 2012	May 31, 2012
Revelations: The Demon Slayer	Atlus	April 25, 2012	Unreleased	Unreleased
Shantae	WayForward	Unreleased	July 18, 2013	July 18, 2013
Shin Megami Tensei: Devil Children – Black Book	Atlus	November 13, 2013	Unreleased	Unreleased
Shin Megami Tensei: Devil Children – Red Book	Atlus	November 13, 2013	Unreleased	Unreleased
Super Mario Bros. Deluxe	Nintendo	January 27, 2014 (Note: Available exclusively to users who registered their Nintendo Network ID before January 13, 2014.)	December 25, 2014 (Note: Initially available for free to users who registered their Nintendo Network ID between December 10, 2013 and January 31, 2014.)	February 27, 2014
Toki Tori	Two Tribes B.V.	Unreleased	August 30, 2012	August 2, 2012
Trade & Battle: Card Hero	Nintendo	August 10, 2011	Unreleased	Unreleased
Xtreme Sports	WayForward	Unreleased	August 21, 2014	August 7, 2014
Wario Land II	Nintendo	April 4, 2012	December 20, 2012	July 19, 2012
Wario Land 3	Nintendo	May 2, 2012	August 29, 2013	December 6, 2012

=== Game Gear ===
A total of 23 Game Gear games (Note: 22 games in Japan, 16 games in North America and PAL regions) were available to purchase.

Title	Publisher	JP Release Date	NA Release Date	PAL Release Date
Columns	Sega	August 8, 2012	June 13, 2013	June 13, 2013
Crystal Warriors	Sega	February 6, 2013	June 27, 2013	June 27, 2013
Defenders of Oasis	Sega	July 18, 2012	June 20, 2013	June 20, 2013
Dr. Robotnik's Mean Bean Machine	Sega	Unreleased	June 13, 2013	June 13, 2013
Dragon Crystal	Sega	March 14, 2012	March 15, 2012	March 29, 2012
The G.G. Shinobi	Sega	March 14, 2012	March 15, 2012	March 29, 2012
G-LOC: Air Battle	Sega	September 26, 2012	July 4, 2013	July 4, 2013
Master of Darkness	Sega (Note: Published by SIMS in Japan)	June 27, 2012	July 4, 2013	July 4, 2013
Nazo Puyo	Sega	September 25, 2013	Unreleased	Unreleased
Nazo Puyo 2	Sega	October 23, 2013	Unreleased	Unreleased
Nazo Puyo: Aruru no Ruu	Sega	November 20, 2013	Unreleased	Unreleased
Puyo Puyo	Sega	January 30, 2013	Unreleased	Unreleased
Puyo Puyo 2	Sega	December 25, 2013	Unreleased	Unreleased
Shining Force Gaiden	Sega	October 2, 2013	Unreleased	Unreleased
Shining Force Gaiden: Final Conflict	Sega	January 15, 2014	Unreleased	Unreleased
Shining Force: The Sword of Hajya	Sega	November 6, 2013	June 13, 2013	June 13, 2013
Sonic Blast	Sega	April 18, 2012	June 20, 2013	June 14, 2012
Sonic Drift 2	Sega	November 14, 2012	July 4, 2013	July 4, 2013
Sonic Labyrinth	Sega	May 16, 2012	June 27, 2013	May 10, 2013
Sonic the Hedgehog	Sega	December 4, 2013	June 7, 2013	June 13, 2013
Sonic the Hedgehog 2	Sega	October 31, 2012	June 27, 2013	June 27, 2013
Sonic the Hedgehog: Triple Trouble	Sega	March 14, 2012	March 15, 2012	March 29, 2012
Tails Adventure	Sega	April 3, 2013	June 20, 2013	June 20, 2013

=== Nintendo Entertainment System ===
A total of 119 NES games (Note: 112 games in Japan, 64 games in North America, 63 games in PAL regions) were available to purchase, including one that was only available via special promotions. Select Japanese releases are based on their Famicom Disk System versions.

Title	Publisher	JP Release Date	NA Release Date	PAL Release Date
Adventure Island II	Konami	April 24, 2013	March 6, 2014	March 27, 2014
Adventures of Lolo	Nintendo	Unreleased	January 8, 2015	October 16, 2014
Adventures of Lolo 2	HAL Laboratory	April 9, 2014	Unreleased	Unreleased
Atlantis no Nazo	Sunsoft	October 2, 2013	Unreleased	Unreleased
Balloon Fight (Note: Distributed for free to Nintendo 3DS Ambassadors on August 30, 2011, ahead of their paid public release.)	Nintendo	August 22, 2012	Unreleased	Unreleased
Bases Loaded	Hamster	May 15, 2013	July 10, 2014	Unreleased
Battle City	Bandai Namco Entertainment	July 31, 2013	Unreleased	Unreleased
Binary Land	Konami	August 7, 2013	Unreleased	Unreleased
Bio Miracle Bokutte Upa (Note: Japanese version based on Famicom Disk System release.)	Konami	February 19, 2014	Unreleased	Unreleased
Blaster Master	Sunsoft	September 5, 2012	July 24, 2014	January 10, 2013
Bubble Bobble	Square Enix	October 16, 2013	Unreleased	Unreleased
Castlevania	Konami	October 17, 2012	April 4, 2013	February 14, 2013
Castlevania II: Simon's Quest	Konami	March 27, 2013	January 16, 2014	January 16, 2014
Castlevania III: Dracula's Curse	Konami	Unreleased	June 26, 2014	April 17, 2014
Chack'n Pop	Square Enix	November 20, 2013	Unreleased	Unreleased
Challenger	Konami	March 13, 2013	Unreleased	Unreleased
City Connection	Hamster	January 16, 2013	November 21, 2013	October 17, 2013
Clu Clu Land	Nintendo	June 12, 2013	March 27, 2014	May 8, 2014
Crash 'N' The Boys: Street Challenge	Arc System Works	January 23, 2013	December 19, 2013	November 28, 2013
Devil World	Nintendo	April 17, 2013	Unreleased	March 20, 2014
Dig Dug	Bandai Namco Entertainment	October 3, 2012	February 14, 2013	April 18, 2013
Donkey Kong	Nintendo	October 17, 2012	August 15, 2013	November 21, 2013
Donkey Kong 3	Nintendo	March 27, 2013	December 5, 2013	December 12, 2013
Donkey Kong Jr.	Nintendo	April 18, 2012	June 14, 2012	August 23, 2012
Donkey Kong: Original Edition (Note: Special limited release)	Nintendo	July 28, 2012	October 1, 2012	September 18, 2014
Double Dragon	Arc System Works	February 6, 2013	December 12, 2013	December 5, 2013
Double Dragon II: The Revenge	Arc System Works	May 29, 2013	June 12, 2014	May 22, 2014
Downtown Special: Kunio-kun no Jidaigeki da yo Zenin Shūgō!	Arc System Works	July 10, 2013	Unreleased	Unreleased
Downtown Nekketsu Kōshinkyoku: Soreyuke Daiundōkai	Arc System Works	June 12, 2013	Unreleased	Unreleased
Dragon Buster	Bandai Namco Entertainment	March 19, 2013	Unreleased	Unreleased
Elevator Action	Square Enix	March 12, 2014	Unreleased	Unreleased
Esper Dream	Konami	July 10, 2013	Unreleased	Unreleased
Famicom Tantei Club: Kieta Kōkeisha (Zengohen)	Nintendo	April 24, 2013	Unreleased	Unreleased
Famicom Tantei Club Part II: Ushiro ni Tatsu Shōjo (Zengohen)	Nintendo	May 1, 2013	Unreleased	Unreleased
Famicom Wars	Nintendo	December 26, 2012	Unreleased	Unreleased
Field Combat	Hamster	May 1, 2013	Unreleased	Unreleased
Final Fantasy	Square Enix	December 18, 2013	Unreleased	Unreleased
Final Fantasy II	Square Enix	February 12, 2014	Unreleased	Unreleased
Final Fantasy III	Square Enix	April 23, 2014	Unreleased	Unreleased
Fire Emblem Gaiden	Nintendo	April 3, 2013	Unreleased	Unreleased
Fire Emblem: Shadow Dragon and the Blade of Light	Nintendo	August 1, 2012	Unreleased	Unreleased
Front Line	Square Enix	January 15, 2014	Unreleased	Unreleased
Galaga	Bandai Namco Entertainment	May 22, 2013	March 13, 2014	May 1, 2014
Ganbare Goemon 2	Konami	January 8, 2014	Unreleased	Unreleased
Ganbare Goemon Gaiden: Kieta Ōgon Kiseru	Konami	June 5, 2013	Unreleased	Unreleased
Ganbare Goemon! Karakuri Dōchū	Konami	March 6, 2013	Unreleased	Unreleased
Gargoyle's Quest II	Capcom	March 5, 2014	October 30, 2014	October 30, 2014
Getsu Fūma Den	Konami	February 20, 2013	Unreleased	Unreleased
Ghosts 'n Goblins	Capcom	February 13, 2013	October 25, 2012	January 3, 2013
Gradius	Konami	May 8, 2013	October 18, 2012	November 1, 2012
Hanjuku Hero	Square Enix	October 30, 2013	Unreleased	Unreleased
Ice Climber	Nintendo	July 4, 2012	January 31, 2013	May 2, 2013
Ike Ike! Nekketsu Hockey Bu: Subette Koronde Dairantō	Arc System Works	August 7, 2013	Unreleased	Unreleased
Ikki	Sunsoft	February 13, 2013	Unreleased	Unreleased
Joy Mech Fight	Nintendo	September 11, 2013	Unreleased	Unreleased
Kekkyoku Nankyoku Daibōken	Konami	August 21, 2013	Unreleased	Unreleased
King's Knight	Square Enix	February 5, 2014	Unreleased	Unreleased
The Legend of Kage	Square Enix	January 22, 2014	Unreleased	Unreleased
The Legend of Zelda	Nintendo	December 22, 2011	July 5, 2012	April 12, 2012
Mach Rider	Nintendo	July 17, 2013	April 10, 2014	June 12, 2014
Mappy	Bandai Namco Entertainment	August 28, 2013	Unreleased	Unreleased
Mario Bros.	Nintendo	May 8, 2013	January 30, 2014	January 9, 2014
Mega Man	Capcom	July 18, 2012	December 27, 2012	October 18, 2012
Mega Man 2	Capcom	August 8, 2012	February 7, 2013	February 7, 2013
Mega Man 3	Capcom	September 26, 2012	March 14, 2013	April 4, 2013
Mega Man 4	Capcom	October 17, 2012	April 25, 2013	April 25, 2013
Mega Man 5	Capcom	November 14, 2012	May 16, 2013	May 16, 2013
Mega Man 6	Capcom	December 12, 2012	June 20, 2013	June 11, 2013
Metal Max	Enterbrain	January 9, 2013	Unreleased	Unreleased
Metroid	Nintendo	February 29, 2012	March 1, 2012	March 15, 2012
Mighty Bomb Jack	Koei Tecmo	September 26, 2012	December 6, 2012	October 25, 2012
Mighty Final Fight	Capcom	January 29, 2014	November 27, 2014	October 9, 2014
Milon's Secret Castle	Konami	December 26, 2012	October 31, 2013	September 26, 2013
The Mysterious Murasame Castle	Nintendo	July 3, 2013	August 7, 2014	May 29, 2014
NES Open Tournament Golf	Nintendo	August 10, 2012	July 5, 2012	August 23, 2012
Ninja Gaiden	Koei Tecmo	August 29, 2012	December 13, 2012	November 15, 2012
Ninja Gaiden II: The Dark Sword of Chaos	Koei Tecmo	Unreleased	August 22, 2013	August 29, 2013
Ninja Gaiden III: The Ancient Ship of Doom	Koei Tecmo	Unreleased	November 28, 2013	January 23, 2014
Ninja JaJaMaru-kun	Hamster	October 31, 2012	Unreleased	Unreleased
Nintendo World Cup	Arc System Works	May 22, 2013	Unreleased	Unreleased
Nuts & Milk	Konami	July 17, 2013	Unreleased	Unreleased
Pac-Man	Bandai Namco Entertainment	November 21, 2012	November 29, 2012	February 28, 2013
Princess Tomato in the Salad Kingdom	Konami	September 19, 2012	Unreleased	Unreleased
Punch-Out!!	Nintendo	February 1, 2012	March 8, 2012	March 1, 2012
Recca	Kaga Denshi	December 12, 2012	September 5, 2013	August 15, 2013
Renegade	Arc System Works	April 3, 2013	February 27, 2014	February 20, 2014
Ripple Island	Sunsoft	April 10, 2013	Unreleased	Unreleased
River City Ransom	Arc System Works	November 28, 2012	November 14, 2013	July 25, 2013
S.C.A.T.	Natsume Co., Ltd.	Unreleased	January 22, 2015	December 4, 2014
Salamander	Konami	February 20, 2013	January 23, 2014	December 19, 2013
SD Gundam World - Gachapon Senshi: Scramble Wars	Bandai Namco Entertainment	March 19, 2014	Unreleased	Unreleased
Shadow of the Ninja	Natsume Co., Ltd.	Unreleased	January 29, 2015	December 4, 2014
Shadowgate	Kemco	April 30, 2014	Unreleased	Unreleased
Shin Onigashima	Nintendo	June 5, 2013	Unreleased	Unreleased
Sky Kid	Bandai Namco Entertainment	April 10, 2013	February 20, 2014	Unreleased
Solomon's Key	Koei Tecmo	December 5, 2012	September 19, 2013	August 22, 2013
Spelunker	Tozai Games	December 19, 2012	June 27, 2013	July 18, 2013
Star Luster	Bandai Namco Entertainment	November 27, 2013	Unreleased	Unreleased
Star Soldier	Konami	November 14, 2012	October 24, 2013	August 15, 2013
Street Fighter 2010: The Final Fight	Capcom	February 26, 2014	September 4, 2014	October 2, 2014
Sugoro Quest: Dice Heroes	Arc System Works	March 19, 2013	Unreleased	Unreleased
Super Contra	Konami	October 10, 2012	January 24, 2013	May 2, 2013
Super Dodge Ball	Arc System Works	March 6, 2013	June 18, 2014	June 5, 2014
Super Mario Bros.	Nintendo	January 5, 2012	February 16, 2012	March 1, 2012
Super Mario Bros. 2	Nintendo	November 28, 2012	July 11, 2013	August 7, 2013
Super Mario Bros. 3	Nintendo	January 1, 2013	April 17, 2014	December 26, 2013
Super Mario Bros.: The Lost Levels	Nintendo	July 25, 2012	December 27, 2012	December 27, 2012
Tecmo Bowl	Koei Tecmo	Unreleased	September 12, 2013	Unreleased
Tōkaidō Gojūsan-tsugi	Sunsoft	September 18, 2013	Unreleased	Unreleased
The Tower of Druaga	Bandai Namco Entertainment	December 19, 2012	Unreleased	Unreleased
Tsuppari Ōzumō	Koei Tecmo	June 19, 2013	Unreleased	Unreleased
Ufouria: The Saga	Sunsoft	July 24, 2013	Unreleased	Unreleased
Valkyrie no Bōken: Toki no Kagi Densetsu	Bandai Namco Entertainment	September 4, 2013	Unreleased	Unreleased
Wario's Woods	Nintendo	May 29, 2013	November 7, 2013	October 24, 2013
The Wing of Madoola	Sunsoft	January 30, 2013	Unreleased	Unreleased
Wrecking Crew	Nintendo	September 19, 2012	March 7, 2013	May 9, 2013
Yie Ar Kung-Fu	Konami	June 19, 2013	Unreleased	Unreleased
Yoshi	Nintendo	August 22, 2012	February 21, 2013	May 2, 2013
Zelda II: The Adventure of Link	Nintendo	June 6, 2012	November 22, 2012	September 13, 2012

=== Super Nintendo Entertainment System ===
A total of 49 SNES games (Note: 49 games in Japan, 30 games in North America, 31 games in PAL regions) were available to purchase. These games were only playable on the New Nintendo 3DS family of systems (New Nintendo 3DS, New Nintendo 3DS XL and New Nintendo 2DS XL) due to its greater processing power.

Title	Publisher	JP Release Date	NA Release Date	PAL Release Date
Breath of Fire	Capcom	August 23, 2017	October 20, 2016	October 6, 2016
Breath of Fire II	Capcom	August 23, 2017	November 24, 2016	October 6, 2016
Castlevania: Dracula X	Konami	August 23, 2017	December 29, 2016	January 26, 2017
Contra III: The Alien Wars	Konami	May 9, 2016	May 19, 2016	May 12, 2016
Demon's Crest	Capcom	August 23, 2017	December 8, 2016	December 15, 2016
Donkey Kong Country	Nintendo	March 4, 2016	March 24, 2016	March 24, 2016
Donkey Kong Country 2: Diddy's Kong Quest	Nintendo	April 6, 2016	April 14, 2016	March 24, 2016
Donkey Kong Country 3: Dixie Kong's Double Trouble!	Nintendo	May 9, 2016	June 2, 2016	June 2, 2016
EarthBound	Nintendo	March 4, 2016	March 24, 2016	March 3, 2016
F-Zero	Nintendo	March 4, 2016	March 3, 2016	March 17, 2016
Famicom Tantei Club Part II: Ushiro ni Tatsu Shōjo	Nintendo	August 23, 2017	Unreleased	Unreleased
Final Fantasy IV	Square Enix	August 23, 2017	Unreleased	Unreleased
Final Fantasy V	Square Enix	August 23, 2017	Unreleased	Unreleased
Final Fantasy VI	Square Enix	August 23, 2017	Unreleased	Unreleased
Final Fight	Capcom	August 9, 2016	July 14, 2016	September 8, 2016
Final Fight 2	Capcom	November 21, 2016	September 22, 2016	September 8, 2016
Final Fight 3	Capcom	November 21, 2016	September 22, 2016	September 8, 2016
Fire Emblem: Mystery of the Emblem	Nintendo	June 22, 2016	Unreleased	Unreleased
Fire Emblem: Seisen no Keifu	Nintendo	August 27, 2016	Unreleased	Unreleased
Fire Emblem: Thracia 776	Nintendo	November 28, 2016	Unreleased	Unreleased
Ganbare Goemon 2: Kiteretsu Shōgun Magginesu	Konami	August 23, 2017	Unreleased	Unreleased
Ganbare Goemon 3: Shishijūrokubē no Karakuri Manji Gatame	Konami	August 23, 2017	Unreleased	Unreleased
Kirby no Kirakira Kizzu	Nintendo	November 28, 2016	Unreleased	Unreleased
Kirby's Dream Course	Nintendo	June 7, 2016	July 28, 2016	June 9, 2016
The Legend of the Mystical Ninja	Konami	June 7, 2016	July 7, 2016	August 25, 2016
The Legend of Zelda: A Link to the Past	Nintendo	March 4, 2016	April 14, 2016	March 10, 2016
Live A Live	Square Enix	November 28, 2016	Unreleased	Unreleased
Mario's Super Picross	Nintendo	November 28, 2016	Unreleased	October 20, 2016
Mega Man 7	Capcom	May 9, 2016	June 16, 2016	July 14, 2016
Mega Man X	Capcom	May 9, 2016	August 11, 2016	July 14, 2016
Mega Man X2	Capcom	July 20, 2016	October 6, 2016	August 11, 2016
Mega Man X3	Capcom	November 21, 2016	November 10, 2016	August 11, 2016
Ogre Battle: The March of the Black Queen	Square Enix	August 23, 2017	Unreleased	Unreleased
Panel de Pon	Nintendo	August 9, 2016	Unreleased	Unreleased
Pilotwings	Nintendo	April 6, 2016	March 3, 2016	April 14, 2016
Pop'n TwinBee	Konami	November 28, 2016	Unreleased	Unreleased
Romancing SaGa	Square Enix	November 21, 2016	Unreleased	Unreleased
Romancing SaGa 2	Square Enix	August 23, 2017	Unreleased	Unreleased
Street Fighter II Turbo	Capcom	July 20, 2016	August 25, 2016	July 28, 2016
Street Fighter Alpha 2	Capcom	August 9, 2016	August 25, 2016	July 28, 2016
Super Castlevania IV	Konami	November 21, 2016	September 8, 2016	October 20, 2016
Super Famicom Wars	Nintendo	November 28, 2016	Unreleased	Unreleased
Super Ghouls 'n Ghosts	Capcom	July 20, 2016	June 23, 2016	October 20, 2016
Super Mario Kart	Nintendo	May 9, 2016	March 24, 2016	March 17, 2016
Super Mario World	Nintendo	March 4, 2016	March 3, 2016	March 3, 2016
Super Metroid	Nintendo	April 6, 2016	April 14, 2016	March 10, 2016
Super Punch-Out!!	Nintendo	November 21, 2016	May 5, 2016	April 28, 2016
Super Street Fighter II: The New Challengers	Capcom	June 7, 2016	August 25, 2016	July 28, 2016
Tactics Ogre: Let Us Cling Together	Square Enix	November 21, 2016	Unreleased	Unreleased

=== PC Engine ===
A total of 4 PC Engine games were available to purchase. All of the games were only available in Japan.

Title	Publisher	JP Release Date
Alien Crush	Konami	February 26, 2014
China Warrior	Konami	December 25, 2013
Gradius	Konami	December 25, 2013
R-Type (Note: Based on the North American version, which combines both Japanese releases. Delisted on June 30, 2020.)	Konami	February 26, 2014

=== Game Boy Advance ===
A total of 10 Game Boy Advance games were released on December 16, 2011, in all regions. These were available exclusively for Nintendo 3DS Ambassadors and were never released to the general public. Additionally, since these titles run natively and are not emulated, they do not support typical emulation features, such as suspended play and restore points.

Title	Publisher	Release Date
F-Zero: Maximum Velocity	Nintendo	December 16, 2011
Fire Emblem: The Sacred Stones	Nintendo	December 16, 2011
Kirby & the Amazing Mirror	Nintendo	December 16, 2011
The Legend of Zelda: The Minish Cap	Nintendo	December 16, 2011
Mario Kart: Super Circuit	Nintendo	December 16, 2011
Mario vs. Donkey Kong	Nintendo	December 16, 2011
Metroid Fusion	Nintendo	December 16, 2011
Wario Land 4	Nintendo	December 16, 2011
WarioWare, Inc.: Mega Microgames!	Nintendo	December 16, 2011
Yoshi's Island: Super Mario Advance 3	Nintendo	December 16, 2011

== See also ==
- List of Virtual Console games for Wii
- List of Virtual Console games for Wii U
- List of DSiWare games
- 3D Classics
- Sega 3D Reprint Archives
