= The Wing of Madoola =

1986 video game

- Developer: Sunsoft
- Publisher: Sunsoft
- Designer: Kenji Sada
- Programmers: Atsushi Sakai; Kenji Sada; Kenji Kajita
- Artists: Kazuyuki Sugiura; Kenji Mori
- Composer: Naoki Kodaka
- Platform: Family Computer
- Release: JP: December 18, 1986
- Genre: Platform
- Mode: Single-player

The Wing of Madoola (Note: Japanese: マドゥーラの翼, Hepburn: Madūra no Tsubasa; lit. "Wings of Madoola") is a platform video game developed and published by Sunsoft. It was published in 1986 for the Family Computer. The game stars Lucia, a magic-wielding warrior of the Rameru clan. Darutos, a descendant of the Rameru line, found the Wing of Madoola statue and used it to build a demonic fortress and summon demons to conquer the world. Lucia must retrieve the statue and stop Darutos. Throughout the journey, the player explores and search for items and power-ups to increase Lucia's attributes, while fighting enemies and defeating bosses.

The Wing of Madoola was designed by Kenji Sada, being his first project at Sunsoft after joining the company in 1986, and developed over the course of six months. Sada acted as the game's main programmer, planner, and team lead. He intended to make an action game and choose a female lead for the game, a decision he felt gave character to the title. Artist Kenji "Moriken" Mori acted as character designer. The music was composed by Naoki Kodaka, with assistance by sound programmer Naohisa Morota.

The Wing of Madoola garnered a mixed reception from critics and retrospective commentators. The game was supplemented with manga adaptations and music albums. The character of Lucia would make appearances in other titles, including a doujinshi adventure game released for PC in 2009, and became a popular Sunsoft character among Japanese retro gaming fans.

== Gameplay and premise ==
Lucia fighting against enemies in stage 2

The Wing of Madoola is a side-scrolling action-platform game with role-playing elements, similar to Athena (1986). The story is set in the kingdom of Badham, which hosted a bird statue known as the Wing of Madoola. The wing grants power to rule the world to the one who possessed it, which caused many wars between nations to have control over it. A king hid it to stop the wars and entrusted the Rameru family to protect the wing. Darutos, a descendant of the Rameru lineage, found the statue and betrayed his family by using it to build a demonic fortress and summon demons to conquer the world. Lucia, a magic-wielding warrior of the Rameru clan, must retrieve the statue and stop Darutos.

The player controls Lucia and fights against enemies across 16 stages. The main objective of each stage is to locate and defeat a boss, and collect a crystal ball under their possession in order to gain entrance to the next stage. Lucia can jump, climb ladders, crouch, attack with her sword, and use magic. The player explores and searches for items and power-ups to increase Lucia's maximum health and attributes. These items and power-ups include boots which augment her overall speed and jumping abilities, swords to increase attack strength, health jars, and spell books. There are six types of magical attacks, ranging from flame swords to flash magic.

The game is considered difficult to beat. Enemies inflict large amounts of damage, and many continue to attack Lucia with multiple consecutive hits. Enemies can also withstand a tremendous amount of damage before being defeated. Later stages become more maze-like, making the player overlook necessary items that can make the completion of the game much easier. The game is over if Lucia's health is depleted.

== Development ==
The Wing of Madoola was designed by Kenji Sada, who had previously worked at T&E Soft on an educational game for the Family Computer titled Keisan Game. It was Sada's first project at Sunsoft, who joined the company in 1986 after being invited by his former high school friend Kenji Kajita. Sada acted as the game's main programmer, planner, and team lead. Kajita served as co-programmer, with Atsushi Sakai and a programmer named Nakagawa providing additional support. Kazuyuki Sugiura, who worked on the Famicom port of Fantasy Zone, and "Kiritan" Simomura were responsible for the map design and graphics respectively. Sugiura initially joined Sunsoft as a part-timer, but eventually became a full-time employee. Artist Kenji "Moriken" Mori, who had previously worked on Firework Thrower Kantaro's 53 Stations of the Tokaido and Dead Zone (1986), acted as the game's character designer. The music was composed by Naoki Kodaka, with assistance by sound programmer Naohisa Morota.

The Wing of Madoola was developed over the course of six months. Sada intended to make an action game instead of an action role-playing game. Sada choose a female lead for the game, stating that the game would have been very similar to Dragon Buster if the protagonist was a male. Sada did not have a specific reason for choosing making a woman the protagonist, but felt the decision gave the game character. Sugiura conceived the game's title, though he explained the name had no meaning and jokingly explained that "I was just doodling because I liked the balance of the characters."

== Release ==
The Wing of Madoola was first announced on October 17, 1986, in that week's issue of Famitsu, planning for a November release date. It was published in Japan by Sunsoft for the Family Computer on December 18, 1986. Plans for a North American localization never materialized; Sunsoft of America's Richard Robbins criticized the game harshly, saying that action games like Contra sell in North America and that female protagonists were not worth talking about. An arcade version dubbed The Wings of Madoola (Note: マドゥーラの翼 (Madūra no Tsubasa)) was planned for the Nintendo VS. System, an arcade system based on the Famicom hardware. Developed by Kenji Sada, it introduced changes that adapted the game for the arcade format, such as a health counter which slowly runs down. The VS. edition was exhibited at the 1987 AOU Show, but was shelved after its location test did not go well. A prototype PCB was discovered by Sunsoft in 2023. The game was first re-released alongside Super Arabian and Atlantis no Nazo as a part of the Ultra2000 Sunsoft Classic Games Vol. 1 compilation, published by MediaKite for Microsoft Windows on June 29, 2001. It was also included alongside Firework Thrower Kantaro's 53 Stations of the Tokaido as part of Memorial Series Sunsoft Vol. 3, a double-pack published by Sunsoft for PlayStation on December 27, 2001.

The game was re-bundled along with Super Arabian and Atlantis no Nazo as part of Sunsoft Masterpiece Selection 1 Yū Yū compilation, published by MediaKite for Windows on July 2, 2004. In 2007, the Memorial Series Sunsoft Vol. 3 pack was made available by Sunsoft as part of the "Game Archives" line on PlayStation Network. In 2010, The Wing of Madoola was re-released in digital form for Windows through D4 Enterprise's Project EGG service. In 2013, it was re-released on the Nintendo 3DS Virtual Console via Nintendo eShop. In 2019, the company City Connection announced that the game will be included alongside several other Sunsoft titles as part of the third compilation in the Rom Cassette Collection series. In 2023, Sunsoft launched a crowdfunding campaign via the Japanese website Camp-Fire for Nintendo Switch and PC ports of the game, as well as Firework Thrower Kantaro's 53 Stations of the Tokaido and Ripple Island. The campaign ended on August 31, 2023, raising ¥21.250.799 ($145.350,32) in total. On April 18, 2024, the games were included as part of the Sunsoft Is Back! Retro Game Selection compilation for Switch and PC. Sunsoft and publisher Red Art Games localized the compilation into English and was released on September 6, 2024 for the Nintendo Switch, Windows, PlayStation 5, and Xbox Series X and Series S, marking the game's first appearance in western regions.

=== Other media ===
To promote the game's release, Sunsoft held a contest to find a hidden password within the game's eighth stage. The players could send the password to Sunsoft in exchange for a cassette tape, which contained two arranged tracks from The Wing of Madoola and Dead Zone (1986) respectively. The game received a manga adaptation published as part of Tokuma Shoten's Wanpaku Comic magazine on January 20, 1987, written and illustrated by Yū Minazuki. In February 1987, Shogakukan and Tokuma Shoten published their respective strategy guidebooks for the game. A second manga adaptation by the pseudonymous author "Ranmaru" was also published as part of Wanpaku Comic on February 25, 1987. A third manga adaptation was published as a double-pack with an adaptation of Ripple Island as part of Wanpaku Comic on February 20, 1988, authored by Kenji Mori.

The Wing of Madoola received an album containing the original soundtrack and other Famicom titles, distributed in Japan by Scitron in 2004. The game's soundtrack was replicated along with the arranged track as part of a three-disc compilation album titled Rom Cassette Disc In Sunsoft, distributed under City Connection's Clarice Disk label on June 29, 2011. In August 2011, another album containing the game's OST and other Sunsoft titles was released by Wave Master. That same year, a third album containing a new arrangement of the game's music was also released by City Connection. Between 2021 and 2022, the manga adaptations by Mori and Minazuki were reissued by Tokuma Shoten as ebooks.

== Reception ==
Reception

Review scores
Publication	Score
Famitsu	3/10, 6/10, 7/10, 5/10
Beep	3/5

The Wing of Madoola garnered a mixed reception from critics and retrospective commentators. Readers of Family Computer Magazine voted to give the game a 17.55 out of 30 score in a 1991 public poll. 1Up.com's Todd Ciolek regarded Lucia as one of three "unsung" heroines from gaming's early days. Ciolek pointed out the game's difficulty however, citing the annoying enemies and undocumented continue system. USgamer's Jeremy Parish labelled Wing of Madoola as one of the best import titles for the 3DS Virtual Console, calling it a decent second-rate Famicom game. Hardcore Gaming 101's Kurt Kalata noted the game's unrefined action, difficulty, repetitive visuals and stage layouts, average music, and clumsy nature of both the combat and RPG elements. Kalata stated that Madoola is "only really playable for those with a historical interest in action-RPGs."

== Legacy ==
The character of Lucia would later make appearances outside of The Wing of Madoola, and became a popular Sunsoft character among Japanese retro gaming fans. Lucia was featured in Sunsoft's Sunclub magazine, being used on the cover of the first volume, as well as in other materials from the publication. Lucia appeared in other titles such as Barcode World (1992), Shanghai Musume: Mahjong Girls (2011) for Android and iOS devices, and as a Symbol Art in Phantasy Star Online 2 (2012). In 2009, an adventure game starring Lucia titled Ma○oolaEX was released for PC on the Japanese doujinshi site DLsite by Kenji Mori under his circle name M's Cafe.

The Wing of Madoola was featured in the Japanese TV show GameCenter CX (Retro Game Master). In 2010, a doujin CD containing music from the game and Ma○oolaEX was distributed by the group Mackerel Sky at Comiket, featuring a cover illustrated by Mori. Mori also authored a manga spin-off called The Wing of Madoola Gaiden. In 2014, artwork from the game was exhibited at the Digital Contents Expo in Nagoya.
