= Gonbe =

Gonbe (ごんべ) could refer to:

- Gonbe, the protagonist of Sunsoft's arcade game, Ikki.
- Gonbe, one of the characters in the Pokémon series. Known outside Japan as Munchlax.
- Gonbe, the pet of the character Chimney from One Piece.
