= Super Boy Allan =

1987 video game

- Developer: ASK Kodansha
- Publisher: Sunsoft
- Composer: Naoki Kodaka
- Series: Chinou (Intelligence Game)
- Platform: Family Computer Disk System
- Release: JP: 27 March 1987
- Genre: Educational video game
- Mode: Single-player

Super Boy Allan (スーパーボーイ・アラン, Sūpā Bōi Aran) is an educational video game developed by ASK Kodansha for the Family Computer Disk System, and published by Sunsoft in 1987.

Super Boy Allan is the second installment in Sunsoft and Asmik's Intelligence Game trilogy. It is preceded by Adian no Tsue (1986), and followed by Chitei Tairiku Orudora (1987).

In the game, Allan Colada journeys from his home in the foothills into the mountains to retrieve a remedy for his sister Leela's fever.

== Gameplay ==
To progress through most game screens, the player must push, kick, or pull logs to clear a path to the exit, as well as to solve arithmetic equations and inequality statements involving fractions.

The mechanics of the log-pushing puzzles are comparable to those in the Eggerland video game franchise, which in turn derive from Sokoban (1982). However, by using a rope (which are in limited supply), Allan can also pull a log away. Kicking a log toward an enemy defeats the enemy.

The design of the game world is patterned on Nintendo's action-adventure game The Legend of Zelda (1986).

== See also ==
- Donkey Kong Jr. Math (1983)
- List of video games published by Sunsoft
