= Mahjong Cub3d =

2011 video game

- North American box art
- Developer(s): Sunsoft
- Publisher(s): JP: Sunsoft; NA: Index Digital Media
- Platform(s): Nintendo 3DS
- Release: JP: March 3, 2011; NA: October 11, 2011
- Genre(s): Puzzle (Mahjong)
- Mode(s): Single-player; Multiplayer

Mahjong Cub3d, known in Japan as Shanghai 3D Cube (上海3Dキューブ, Shanhai 3D Kyūbu), is a Mahjong-based video game developed and published by Sunsoft, for the Nintendo 3DS. Atlus USA published the title in North America.

== See also ==
- Mahjong video game
