= The Note (video game) =

1997 video game

The Note 公開されなかった手記
- Developers: NK System Co., Ltd.
- Publishers: Team Bughouse; Sunsoft
- Composer: Ken Kojima
- Platform: PlayStation
- Release: JP: January 17, 1997; EU: October 1, 1997
- Genres: Adventure, survival horror
- Mode: Single-player

The Note (公開されなかった手記, Koukai Sarenakatta Shuki) is a first-person survival horror adventure game developed by NK System and published by Team Bughouse in Japan and Sunsoft in Europe for the PlayStation. It was released in Japan on January 17, 1997, and in Europe on October 1 of the same year. The game was not released in North America.

== Story ==
The game is set in January, 1997. Akira, a freelance occult journalist, is visited by a woman whose daughter left on a trip with her friends and never returned. He agrees to look for the woman's daughter, and is given the last things the woman received from her, including a photo of an old run-down mansion somewhere in Europe, and what seem to be unearthly spirits. Two weeks after this meeting, Akira and his partner Angela find themselves in a remote European village in front of the mansion shown in the photos, where the game begins.

== Characters ==
- Akira (Aged 23) A freelance occult journalist for the past three years, who has never written an article based on an actual paranormal experience. His work so far has been selling fake ghost photos and fabricated articles to specialist magazines.
- Angela (Aged 21) Akira's partner, who accompanies him to Europe to help him find the missing teenagers.
- Linda, Toshi, Dave (Ages 18, 17, 18) The missing senior high school students who Akira and Angela have been tasked with locating.
- Paulo: (Aged 26) Akira and Angela first meet Paulo in the mansion, and he seems extremely knowledgeable about the occult and the mansion.

== Release and reception ==
Reception

Review scores
Publication	Score
Computer and Video Games	1/5
Famitsu	6/10, 6/10, 6/10, 6/10
Jeuxvideo.com	14/20
Joypad	45%
Mega Fun	51%
Play	72%
PlayStation: The Official Magazine	2/10

The Note was released for the PlayStation in Japan on January 17, 1997.
