= Tough Turf =

1989 video game

- Japanese arcade flyer
- Developers: Sega; Sunsoft
- Publishers: JP: Sega; NA: Sunsoft
- Director: Cho Musou
- Composer: Shinichi Seya
- Platform: Arcade
- Release: 1989
- Genre: Beat 'em up
- Modes: Single-player, multiplayer
- Arcade system: Sega System 16B

Tough Turf (タフターフ) is a 1989 2D beat 'em up arcade game developed by Sunsoft and Sega. It was published by Sega in Japan and by Sunsoft of America in North America.

== Gameplay ==
Up to two players control two men who look like office workers, and proceed through warehouses and urban areas beating up gang members; the characters are not named and the game has no storyline. Tough Turf's control configuration is composed of two attack buttons (punch and kick), as well a jump button, to fight against enemies or overcome obstacles. The player has access to a repertoire of techniques by pushing these buttons individually or in combination. Weapons are also along the lines of long iron pipes, knives and broken bottles.

== Reception ==
According to Kurt Katala of Hardcore Gaming 101, "considering there was very little variation amongst the Final Fight and Teenage Mutant Ninja Turtles clones that popped up in the early '90s, it is interesting to play a game that requires a different approach, and it really is a fresh alternative to Double Dragon."
