= Trip World =

1992 video game

- Game Boy European cover art
- Developer: Sunsoft (Note: Trip World DX was co-developed by Limited Run Games)
- Publisher: Sunsoft
- Director: Yuichi Ueda
- Programmer: Yuichi Ueda
- Artist: Toshihiko Narita
- Composers: Phase Out (Tsutomu Ishida, Masayuki Iwata, Atsushi Mihiro)
- Platforms: Game Boy, Nintendo Switch, PlayStation 4, PlayStation 5
- Release: November 27, 1992: Game Boy; JP: November 27, 1992; UK: June 1993; EU: 1993 Trip World DX Nintendo Switch; WW: November 30, 2023 PS4, PS5; WW: February 15, 2024
- Genre: Platform
- Mode: Single-player

Trip World (Note: Japanese: トリップワールド, Hepburn: Torippu Wārudo) is a 1992 platform video game developed and published by Sunsoft for the Game Boy. It was released in Japan in 1992. The game's plot centers around the bunny-like being Yakopoo and his quest to retrieve the flower of peace so that peace will return to his disarranged world. The protagonist's ability is to shapeshift into different forms.

Its reception was mixed; while it was praised for its graphics and music, it was criticized for its low difficulty and short length, with many comparing it to Gimmick!. It was re-released for the Nintendo 3DS's Virtual Console in Japan in 2011, and in Europe in 2012. A remastered version, Trip World DX, was developed by Limited Run Games and released in 2023.

== Gameplay ==
Yakopoo (right) facing against the first boss, Chong Pei (left).

Trip World is a platform game where the player controls Yakopoo (Note: Japanese: ヤコプ, Hepburn: Yacopu), a bunny-like creature that must retrieve the stolen flower of peace, called the Maita flower. The inhabitants of Trip World turned mad in its absence, acting as the enemies in the game. The player must venture through five stages, called "worlds", each ending with a boss (and in some stages a mini-boss halfway through), that must be defeated to progress. While most of the stages are linear, some have multiple paths that the player can access to reach the boss. The stage settings include areas such as a mountain, a jungle, the ocean and a castle. Each called: Mount Dubious, Savage Land, Ireland, Pudding Land, and Mirror Land, respectively.

Yakopoo is able to shapeshift between different forms; each one can provide unique abilities but may change the way of attacking enemies and navigating stages. Primarily, the player can manually shapeshift Yakopoo to switch between three forms at any time. In his first form, he can walk, jump, and attack enemies by kicking them. In the second form, Yakopoo transforms his ears into wings; he is able to glide. In the third form, Yakopoo resembles a fish, with which he can swim well and attack enemies with foam in water. Other special forms can be found by collecting special fruit power-ups for a short time, that otherwise can't be activated manually. For instance, Flower Yakopoo (stuns enemies with seeds) or Tail Yakopoo (tail attack with long range).

Unlike many other platform games, most of the enemies in Trip World do not hurt the player's character on touch. Most push Yakopoo around when not angered, though he will become violent if attacked. Others like bosses attack freely. At the start of the game, the player receives 3 lives, and the game ends once all lives are gone. The player can replenish lost health by collecting health pickups. They can also continue the game via level select from the title screen.

== Plot ==
The game is set in Trip World, a peaceful world where Yakopoo lives. He is a young member of the Shabubu race of bunny-like beings. Yakopoo lives with his grandfather, an old Shabubu, on the holy mountain known as Mount Dubious, where the Maita Flower is found. The named flower is the flower of peace and is deemed to have supernatural powers. Because of this, it is usually protected by Yakopoo's grandpa, so that it won't fall in the wrong hands. However, one day mysterious shadowy creatures appear, attack Yakopoo's grandfather and steal the flower of peace. Since the Maita Flower has been removed from its place, the peace is gone and the inhabitants of Trip World get mad and don't stop quarreling with each other. In order to save his world, Yakopoo sets out to find the thieves and to return the Maita Flower.

Yakopoo travels through Mount Dubious, Savage Land, Ireland, and Pudding Land, and manages to defeat their respective bosses. Once he makes it to Mirror Land, it turns out that the King of Mirror Land, a Shabubu himself, and his minions stole the flower. After Yakopoo defeats the King's minions and the King who fights Yakopoo in a robot, the Queen appears, who hid with the Maita Flower during the fight. The King was actually possessed by a flower of unknown origin on his head, which now disappears after his defeat. The King turns good again, Yakopoo's grandfather returns the flower to the holy mountain and the peace is back in Trip World.

== Development and release ==
Trip World was developed and published by Sunsoft. It was conceived by Yuichi Ueda after being influenced by Gimmick! (1992). As the programmer, Ueda had to learn to work within the limits of the Game Boy hardware. He programmed the game so items and characters would slide down slopes. He also challenged traditional enemy design tropes by reducing the frequency of reusing enemies, and not incurring damage for the player by simply touching them. The character designer, Toshihiko Narita, who also worked on Gimmick!, drew his characters in round shapes. Ueda asked Narita to design Yakopoo as a chinchilla. Ueda was a fan a Manami Matsumae's work on Mega Man (1987), and so recruited her to assist with music composition. According to Ueda, the game was developed in the spirit of a doujin game. The team designed the game packaging, and Nintendo did not like how they omitted screenshots from the back of the box.

It was released in Japan in November 27, 1992. Around June 1993, its release was reported in the United Kingdom, with other regions across Europe following suit later that year. It was never released in North America. Due to the limited number of copies released, original cartridges and their boxed packaging have become rare collector's items, being sold at high prices on secondary markets. Trip World was re-released for the Nintendo 3DS via the Virtual Console in Japan on November 30, 2011, and in Europe on January 5, 2012.

=== Remaster ===
In April 2023, Limited Run Games announced they were developing Trip World DX, a remastered version of Trip World, in collaboration with Sunsoft. It was released for Nintendo Switch on November 30, 2023, and for PlayStation 4 and PlayStation 5 on February 15, 2024. A physical version for the Nintendo Switch and for PlayStation 5 was released on March 28, alongside a deluxe edition, featuring a CD soundtrack and mini magazine. A Microsoft Windows version was also announced for Steam but never released on the storefront for unknown reasons, instead being sold exclusively in limited physical quantities through Limited Run Games' official website.

== Reception ==
Reception

Review scores
Publication	Score
Famitsu	22/40
Aktueller Software Markt	9/12
Mega Fun	64/100
Video Games (DE)	68%
PlayStation Magazine (JP)	17.4/30

=== Contemporary reviews ===
Upon release, Trip World has received a mixed response from critics. Staff at Aktueller Software Markt stated that Trip World was "a real treat for action fans and anyone else who enjoys a good chuckle". Video Games (DE), referred to Trip World as a "better" platform game and lauded its graphics and music. The review's author commented that Trip World is "ideally suited" for inexperienced players due to its low level of difficulty. The reviewer also praised the "clear game structure", but criticized the "missing lasting appeal" for experienced players.

Reception

Aggregate score
Aggregator	Score
GameRankings	54.50% (2 reviews)

Review scores
Publication	Score
M! Games	DX (Switch): 80/100
Nintendo Life	(3DS): 6/10
Digitally Downloaded	(3DS): 3/5; DX (Switch): 4.5/5

=== Retrospective reviews ===
Retrospectively, critics had a similar sentiment about the game. Hardcore Gaming 101 praised the game's visuals stating it has some of the best visuals on the Game Boy. However, they also criticized the game for being too easy. Marcel van Duyn of Nintendo Life was impressed with the visuals as well, but found the simplicity of the gameplay and the game's length to be lacking. Van Duyn therefore recommended Gimmick! instead, citing it as a game that was somewhat similar but did everything better.

A publication Retro included the game in their "Guide to the Game Boy" article in 2016 that listed the systems "essential releases". The publication compared Trip World to Gimmick! and complimented the "high quality" graphics and sound as well as the variety of power-ups and large stages.

In contrast, a remastered version, Trip World DX, was much more warmly received. Both Thomas Nickel of M! Games and Matt Sainsbury of Digitally Downloaded praised the addition of the "color mode" in the style of Game Boy Color, as well as the inclusion of "extras menu" that features interviews, design documents and its soundtracks. With the latter describing it as "A beautifully revamped Game Boy platformer".

== Legacy ==
Yuichi Ueda considered Trip World one of three games he feels most accomplished with developing, the other two being Galaxy Fight: Universal Warriors (1995) and Waku Waku 7 (1996). In the latter, Ueda included Yakopoo (romanized "Yacopu") as a mini-boss. Similar to some other transforming characters from other one-on-one fighting games, Yakopoo in Galaxy Fight has the ability to shapeshift himself into whoever he fights against, providing a mirror match. A set of 19 Famicom Disk System development disks, previously belonging to Sunsoft, was obtained by a video game collector, DreamTR (Jason Wilson), and was later dumped. In one of the disks, it featured early graphic sprites of Yakopoo.

Many publications, including GameSpot, Polygon, Den of Geek, TouchArcade and Nintendo Life, have listed Trip World as one of the best Game Boy games.
