= Deae Tonosama: Appare Ichiban =

1995 video game

- Cover art
- Developer: Sunsoft
- Publisher: Sunsoft
- Platform: Super Famicom
- Release: JP: March 31, 1995; WW: April 4, 2025
- Modes: Single-player, multiplayer

Deae Tonosama: Appare Ichiban (Note: Japanese: であえ殿様あっぱれ一番, Hepburn: Deae Tonosama: Appare Ichiban; lit. "Bravo to the lord, you're the best") is a 1995 beat 'em up video game developed and published by Sunsoft for the Super Famicom. In 2025, the game was released in English under the name Feudal Bros: Tonosama #1.

== Gameplay ==
The player controls two characters, one an idiotic Japanese lord and the other an equally idiotic Caucasian prince. Both embark on an absurd journey around the world. Levels are highly stereotypical perspectives on various countries, where the characters defeat enemies on the way with melee attacks. The levels end with a boss, typically a person of high importance in the country. The final level is set in outer space where the characters defeat an incoming alien invasion. Both can transform into a highly muscular and macho version of themselves with significantly increased attack power.

== Reception ==
Electronic Gaming Monthly and Marca Player highlighted the title's humor, while Hardcore Gaming 101 described the game as a "below-average clone" of Pocky & Rocky.
