= Power Quest (video game) =

1998 video game

- Developer: Japan System Supply
- Publishers: Capcom; Sunsoft
- Platform: Game Boy Color
- Release: JP: November 27, 1998; NA: December 1998; EU: July 1999
- Genres: Role-playing, fighting
- Mode: Multiplayer

Power Quest, known in Japan as Gekitō Power Modeler (Japanese: 激闘(ゲキトウ)パワーモデラー), is a role-playing-based fighting video game developed by Japan System Supply for the Game Boy Color. It was published in Japan by Capcom on November 27, 1998, and published in North America by Sunsoft in December 1998. It later received a limited European release in July 1999.

In the game, a new craze has hit the town: fighting with model robots. The player walks around the town as the main character, but takes control of the model robot during fights. There are six robot models available, each with different stats and special moves. The models are Max, Gong, Axe, Speed, Lon and Borot. Over time, the player earns credits and buys parts to improve their model. In addition to the story mode, there is a versus mode that allows the player to fight immediately.

== Gameplay ==
The gameplay of Power Quest is a mixture of two genres: role-playing and fighting. The player ventures around the town in which they live on an overworld map. After arriving at a location, a character appears on the screen with some dialogue. This dialog typically involves the character challenging the player to a fight. After being challenged by a character, the game switches to a one-on-one fighting game engine. This is the role-playing battle system which differs from the usual turn-based battle engines of the genre.

New parts can be bought for a model, which is how experience is gained throughout the game. Progress through the game is made by challenging a certain number of people before the next event is triggered. Special events pop up throughout the game after this number is met which usually involve a tournament or beating some strong boss-type character.

The game also allows saving progress with a password. Due to the limited number of statistics that can be tracked, the password feature is able to track parts, accrued money, and current model.

== Plot ==
As the game begins, school is over for the player character (who is never named) and his friend Louis. Summer vacation has begun, and Louis hears about an upcoming tournament involving modelers and is excited about his chances. He is dismayed, however, when he remembers that the player's allowance cannot cover the cost of a model. He has been saving for quite some time and only has enough for one part. The duo then return to the player's house, whose mother has a surprise for him. He has won the grand prize in the model contest that he entered. The grand prize is one model of his choosing. Filled with confidence from his new model, the two decide to enter the tournament.

Since the tournament will not be starting for quite some time, the two decide to warm up on the other modelers around town. After several victories, the two hear rumors about a no-good group called "The Hyena Gang" who use cheap and under-handed tricks to win and steal people's money. Several Hyena Gang members eventually meet up with the player and are bested at his remote control. The last gang member that is defeated warns the main character that their boss will not be bested so easily. Heading to the playground the leaders of The Hyena Gang are found. The first member that is fought at the playground is the Colonel, a high leveled member of the gang (perhaps General's right-hand man). The leader of the gang, General, then steps forward to challenge the player and punish him for harassing his boys. First, however, he has the Scientist turn on a suspicious machine. General the defeats the player who leaves and goes to the local shop. Surprisingly, the shop owner knows how to defeat The Hyena Gang. He reveals that they use radio waves to disrupt a person's communications with their robots, making it impossible to beat them. However, he knows of a way to block these radio waves, by painting the player's robot with a special paint. The player then returns to the playground and defeats General, thus forcing The Hyena Gang to retreat from the town.

After more bouts with the local modelers, the player and Louis are approached by a girl named Ann who challenges them. Louis loses quickly and runs away. Ann muses that men are just as fragile, if not more than women. After Ann leaves, another girl approaches the player and mentions that Ann has never lost to a boy in a robot fight.

Later the Spring Tournament is held, and the player enters. The player defeats both Scientist and General again, and faces Ann in the finals. He defeats her, making the player the first boy Ann lost to, much to her own amazement. After the tournament, the player is summoned to a Japanese castle. The owner has heard of the player's exploits, and wishes to challenge him. After fighting through two overzealous bodyguards, the player meets the owner of the castle. The owner apologizes for what his underlings tried to do to the player, then challenged the player to a fight. Upon his defeat, the owner is excited, since he has not been defeated in such a long time.

The player then returns to his home and discovers that Louis left him a message that says to meet him on the school rooftop. Upon arriving there, Louis reveals that he is moving and will not be able to compete in the upcoming tournament. He also reveals that he will not be able to see the player ever again, so he wants to challenge the player to a battle, model to model. Here Louis is shown to be the only character in the game to use Borot, the game's weakest robot. Upon his defeat Louis gives the player an item allowing the player to use special attacks. He then runs away crying because he will never be able to see the player again.

After all of the events thus far the player is ready for the National Tournament. The player arrives at the National Tournament and is greeted by three past competitors waiting to take him down before the finals. He is greeted first by General who is still sporting his Gong model. After the player quickly defeats General he says 'Hello' to Ann and her Speed model. They fight a slightly harder battle than General but the player defeats her in the end. The player is feeling pretty confident by now since there is only one opponent left to go. Next up is Won from the Japanese castle and his Lon model. They prove to be a tougher opponent for the player, but are bested nonetheless. Everything is going great and then there is one final opponent. A rather large man by the name of Don Quixote. Scientist and General are seen trying to rig the players model to fail. Don Quixote interferes and gives a speech to The Hyena Gang. After that, it is game on between the player and Don Quixote and his model, which is the same as the player's model. After the player beats him in a true contest of strength the game is over. The player is National Champion and their journey to the top is over.

== Regional differences ==
When Gekitō Power Modeler, the original Japanese version, was localized by Sunsoft for release in North America as Power Quest, the only changes to the game were the addition of color and more detailed graphics, a different face on the title screen, a slightly different plot script to the Japanese version's, and multiple languages to choose from. Japan System Supply, the developer of it, was given no credit in the Japanese version, so Sunsoft gave it to them in the North American version.
