= Markham (video game) =

1983 video game

- Developer: Sun Electronics
- Publisher: Sun Electronics
- Platform: Arcade
- Release: JP: December 1983
- Genre: Scrolling shooter
- Modes: Single-player, multiplayer

Markham (Note: Japanese: マーカム, Hepburn: Mākamu) is a 1983 horizontally scrolling shooter video game developed and published by Sun Electronics for arcades. It was only released in Japan in December 1983. It was released outside Japan for the first time by Hamster Corporation as part of their Arcade Archives series for the Nintendo Switch and PlayStation 4 in December 2020.

== Gameplay ==
The player controls a fighter jet which is instructed to destroy research stations in Antarctica. The jet is equipped with ammunition and missiles, which can be combined to defeat enemy objects. Unlike other scrolling shooters, the angle while shooting can be changed by tilting, increasing the complexity of the gameplay while making it easier to shoot enemies moving in erratic ways.
