= Shanghai: True Valor =

1998 video game

- European PlayStation box art
- Developer: Sunsoft
- Publishers: WW: Sunsoft; EU: Activision
- Series: Shanghai
- Platforms: Arcade game, PlayStation
- Release: Arcade: JP: August 1998; PlayStation: JP: September 23, 1998; EU: 1999; NA: May 25, 1999
- Genre: Tile-matching
- Modes: Single-player, multiplayer

Shanghai: True Valor, known in Japan as Shanghai: Matekibuyu (上海 真的武勇), is a tile-matching video game developed and published by Sunsoft and Activision for arcade games and PlayStation in 1998–1999. It is part of the Shanghai series.

== Reception ==
Reception

Review scores
Publication	Score
AllGame	2/5
CNET Gamecenter	6/10
Electronic Gaming Monthly	6.375/10
Famitsu	23/40
GameSpot	5.7/10
Official U.S. PlayStation Magazine	3/5

The PlayStation version received average reviews. In Japan, Famitsu gave it a score of 23 out of 40.
