= Monster Seed =

1998 video game

- PAL box art
- Developer: NK System
- Publisher: Sunsoft
- Platform: PlayStation
- Release: JP: November 5, 1998; NA: March 31, 1999; EU: 1999
- Genre: Role-playing video game
- Modes: Single-player, multiplayer

Monster Seed (モンスターシード, Monsutā Shīdo) is a role-playing video game released for the PlayStation, developed by NK System and published by Sunsoft.

== Reception ==
Reception

Aggregate score
Aggregator	Score
GameRankings	50%

Review scores
Publication	Score
AllGame	2.5/5
Computer and Video Games	1/5
Electronic Gaming Monthly	2.5/10, 3.5/10, 4/10, 6/10
Famitsu	25/40
Game Informer	6/10
GameSpot	7.1/10
Official U.S. PlayStation Magazine	2.5/5
PlayStation: The Official Magazine	3/5

The game received mixed reviews according to the review aggregation website GameRankings. In Japan, Famitsu gave it a score of 25 out of 40.
