= Pettan Pyuu =

1984 video game

- Developer: Sun Electronics
- Publisher: Sun Electronics
- Platform: Arcade
- Release: JP: December 1984
- Genre: Puzzle
- Modes: Single-player, multiplayer

Pettan Pyuu (Note: Japanese: ぺったんピュー, Hepburn: Pettan Pyū) is a 1984 puzzle video game developed and published by Sun Electronics for arcades. It was only released in Japan in December 1984; an international release under the name BanBam never materialized. It was conceptualized by Koji Kenjo, who would later create the Custom Robo series. Despite its unpopularity at the time, it received notoriety for coverage in the February 1985 issue of Mycom Basic Magazine, immediately following an article on The Tower of Druaga that led to the latter's popularity. It was released outside Japan for the first time by Hamster Corporation as part of their Arcade Archives series for the Nintendo Switch and PlayStation 4 in November 2020.

== Gameplay ==
The player controls the titular robot Pettan, who defeats bugs by trapping them under square plates or launching them while navigating various combination of square tiles and walls in the form of red lines. Four types of plates are available, which vary in the directions required to flatten or launch the bugs. Meeting Pettan's girlfriend grants extra points, while bonus stages have her defeat bugs in various ways for extra points. The game ends if Pettan comes into contact with bugs, trapped between or launched by square plates, or simply defeating all bugs in a stage. Tiles turn white upon contact, while traps vary in color; bonus points are granted by taking the quickest path and setting off the least tiles.
