= Ripple Island (video game) =

1988 video game

- Cover art
- Developer: Sunsoft (Note: Developed under the shell corporation Tokai Engineering.)
- Publisher: Sunsoft
- Programmers: Atsushi Sakai; Hiroaki Higashiya
- Artist: Kenji Mori
- Composer: Naoki Kodaka
- Platforms: Family Computer, PlayStation
- Release: JP: January 23, 1988
- Genre: Adventure
- Mode: Single-player

Ripple Island (Note: Japanese: リップルアイランド, Hepburn: Rippuru Airando) is a 1988 adventure game developed and published by Sunsoft for the Family Computer. The game was only released in Japan on January 23, 1988.

The game was translated and released in the Sunsoft Is Back! Retro Game Selection compilation for the Nintendo Switch. Hamster Corporation released the game as part of their Console Archives series for the Nintendo Switch 2 and PlayStation 5 in October 2026. A reimagining, Ripple Island: Kyle and Cal's Restaurant, was released for the Nintendo Switch 2 and Windows in November 2025.

== History ==
Unlike other 1980s Sunsoft games like Ikki or Atlantis no Nazo, Ripple Island is a peaceful command-based adventure game where the player chooses from 5 different actions (look, take, enter, hit, and push) in order to arrive at the game's ending. The game was re-released for the PlayStation in 2002 as part of the Memorial Series Sunsoft Vol. 4 compilation, where it was coupled with Blaster Master. A manga version by one of the game's character designers, Moriken, was serialized in Wanpaku Comics (Tokuma Shoten). The character's appearances differ greatly in the manga version, and only lasted 4 chapters without reaching the conclusion of the game's story-line. 2 more chapters were added in the tankōbon release, which do describe the game's true conclusion. Both the original Famicom cartridge and manga tankōbon are rare, and can only be purchased for higher prices than their original value.

The game was originally planned for the Family Computer Disk System with the title The Darkness of the Emperor (皇帝の闇, Kōtei no Yami). The game enjoyed limited popularity as it was released only 18 days before the release of the highly anticipated Dragon Quest III. Though the game appears easy because of its childish graphics, a few hints are provided for solving certain mysteries, making the game's difficulty quite high. There are four different endings to the game, one of which can be seen even before the player defeats the final boss. The remaining three are decided depending on the player's actions and choices throughout the game. The staff roll is only displayed if the player reaches the game's "true" ending.

== Plot ==
The game takes place on a small island called Ripple Island, where humans and animals lived together in peace, but one day, the evil emperor Gerogeru (ゲロゲール, Gerogēru) suddenly appears on the island and kidnaps the king's daughter. The king promises that he will allow whoever can rescue his daughter to marry her, and a young boy named Kyle (カイル, Kairu) sets off on a long journey to rescue the princess.

=== Characters ===
All of the characters in the game are small humans that are about the same size as woodland creatures. They can communicate with animals in a common language.

Kyle (カイル, Kairu)
The main character of the game sets off on his adventure after seeing the king's offer to allow the rescuer to marry the princess. He is joined by Cal during his journey, and begins to have romantic feelings for her as they travel together.

Cal (キャル, Kyaru)
This short-haired young girl was left alone after her home was destroyed by Gerogēru, and heads off to defeat Gerogēru along with Kyle. She also beings to have feelings for Kyle during the journey, but secretly fears facing the evil emperor, and backs out when they reach the castle doors.

King Dotella (ドテーラ王, Dotēra ou)
The king of Ripple Island is named after Dotera (どてら), a type of traditional Japanese clothing which he also wears.

Princess Nasarell (ナサレル姫, Nasareru-hime)
The daughter of King Dotella and princess of Ripple Island is kidnapped by the emperor at the start of the story, and is turned into a frog.

Gerogeru (ゲロゲール, Gerogēru)
The main antagonist of the game who calls himself the emperor of darkness, and bears the appearance of a gigantic frog.

=== Areas ===
Areas are marked by the player's progress. Fulfilling a set of objectives allows the player to proceed to the next area, and the player may not return to the previous area later in the game, but the player may be automatically taken to the next area depending on the player's actions.

Area 1
Kyle starts off near the King's castle. The path is blocked by another character, so his first task is to find a way to prevent this character from moving. Hints are provided by the animals living around the castle. A girl with a sickness and her younger sister live in the nearby village, and Cal can be found standing on top of her decimated home in the plains.

Area 2
The second area is a forest where many travelers get lost. Kyle wants to gain information on the location of the sacred item from the local elder, but first, he must learn the location of the elder from another animal who will only give out the information if Kyle gives presents him with his favorite food. The player must conduct a thorough search of the forest in order to find the food item. After meeting a family of foxes in the cave located west of the forest, Kyle learns that the elder will also only give information if he gets a certain item that he has been looking for. The real item he is searching for is too dangerous to actually obtain, so Kyle must find a suitable substitute somewhere in the forest. Kyle obtains the sacred item as instructed by the elder, which may convince other creatures to join him in fighting the evil emperor.

Area 3
The third area is a huge snow-field. The player's actions in this area directly influence the game's ending. Several new creatures must be dealt with here, including a sleeping seal and a mother rabbit that is looking for her lost child. The west side of the field is covered with snow, and the lack of landmarks makes it easy to get lost. Snow-topped mountains abound on the east side, and even shouting loudly may cause a huge avalanche of snow.

Area 4
The fourth area is a village that was destroyed by the emperor. Only one resident remains in the village, and Kyle must search for useful items left in the village ruins. There is a suspicious-looking well located in the east, and a bird awaits beyond it, though it flies away as Kyle approaches. The west side is a seashore covered with rocks, but it is impossible to go to the emperor's castle from the seashore. Kyle must try using various items in various locations in order to discover a path to the next area.

Area 5
The final area is the evil emperor's castle. It is constructed strangely, with broken-down walls and a brewery near the entrance. The inside of the castle is guarded by a drunk raccoon and an armadillo, whose body is impervious to all attacks, save for one location. Approaching certain guards causes Kyle to be captured and thrown into the dungeon.
