= Shōnen Ninja Sasuke =

1994 video game

- Developer: Sunsoft
- Publisher: Sunsoft
- Platform: SNES
- Release: JP: October 28, 1994; WW: February 28, 2025
- Genre: Action-adventure
- Mode: Single-player

Shōnen Ninja Sasuke is an action-adventure game released by Sunsoft for the Super Nintendo Entertainment System in 1994. The game was supposed to be released in English as Boy Ninja Sasuke. In October 2024, Ratalaika Games and Sunsoft announced that they would release Shōnen Ninja Sasuke in English under the name Justice Ninja Casey in 2025.

== Gameplay ==
The game is very similar to Konami's The Legend of the Mystical Ninja.

== Plot ==
The young ninja Sasuke and his monk friend Chin-nen embark on a quest to rescue a princess kidnapped by an evil warlord.

== Release and reception ==
Reception

Review score
Publication	Score
Famitsu	6/10, 6/10, 5/10, 4/10

Shōnen Ninja Sasuke was released in Japan for the Super Famicom on October 28, 1994.
