= Route-16 =

1981 video game

- European arcade flyer
- Developer: Sun Electronics
- Publishers: JP: Sun Electromics; NA: Centuri; EU: Tehkan
- Platforms: Arcade, Arcadia 2001, Famicom, PlayStation
- Release: JP: February 1981; NA: April 1981; EU: 1981
- Genres: Maze, racing
- Modes: Single-player, multiplayer

Route-16 (Note: Japanese: ルート16, Hepburn: Rūto Jūroku) is a 1981 maze video game developed and published by Sun Electronics for arcades. The game was released by Tehkan (not yet a video game developer by its release) in Europe and Centuri in North America. It was ported to the Arcadia 2001 console. An enhanced version was released in Japan as Route-16 Turbo for the Famicom in 1985.

== Gameplay ==
The player controls a car and must explore a maze divided into sixteen rooms. The player must collect all the money bags while avoiding colliding with opponents' cars or running out of fuel. Every time the player goes out of a room, a large overworld map is shown, indicating the position of every car and all the money bags. There are also flags that can be driven over to invert the roles, so the player can crash the opposite cars and stop them for a few seconds, while getting bonus points.

Route-16 distinguished itself from other maze games with the addition of an overworld map, showing the locations of the player, cars, and treasures.

== Legacy ==
Route-16 Turbo, (Note: Japanese: ルート16ターボ, Hepburn: Rūto Jūroku Tābo) an improved version of Route-16 for the Famicom, was published on October 4, 1985, by Sunsoft only in Japan. Route-16 Turbo added multiple difficulty levels and improved graphics and music. It is included in the 2001 PlayStation compilation Sunsoft Memorial Vol. 2. The game was also re-released as part of the Nintendo Classics service in Japan on December 12, 2019.

Hamster Corporation released the game as part of their Arcade Archives for the Nintendo Switch and PlayStation 4 in 2018.

== See also ==
- 005
- Rally-X
- Venture
