= Dead Zone (video game) =

1986 video game

- Developer(s): Sunsoft
- Publisher(s): Sunsoft
- Producer(s): Kouichi Kitazumi
- Programmer(s): Yoshiaki Komada
- Artist(s): Kenji Mori
- Composer(s): Naoki Kodaka
- Platform(s): Famicom Disk System
- Release: JP: November 20, 1986
- Genre(s): Adventure
- Mode(s): Single-player

Dead Zone (デッド ゾーン, Deddozōn) is a text-based adventure video game developed and published by Sunsoft for the Famicom Disk System in Japan on November 20, 1986.

== Plot ==
In the space calendar 0385, the Earth suffers from overpopulation and humans start to build space colonies. Cark, the protagonist, works for the Earth Federation's space development office. He is a brilliant engineer in space physics and is working for the Sirius third planet colony. He gets engaged to his girlfriend Mary, but they have to postpone their wedding. Five months later, Cark, accompanied by his robot Carry, decides to visit Mary and prepare the ceremony at last, but when he arrives at the space station where she is in, everything is quiet. Then a beam of light hits him. He wakes up sometimes later, inside a sort of underground graveyard, with pieces of dismantled robots surrounding him (including Lionex (ライオネックス) from Sunsoft's unreleased Nintendo Vs. Series title of the same name).

== Gameplay ==
The player proceeds through the game by choosing from a selection of text menu commands. Like any traditional digital comic/text adventure games, a large view shows the surroundings. The bottom of the screen proposes simple action commands, like see, take or push, but the game is entirely in Japanese (although it uses katakana exclusively). One of the original features of the game is to use real sampled sound in some places, which was unusual for the time.

A complete English fan translation patch was released in November 2019.

== Reception and legacy ==
Reception

Review score
Publication	Score
Famitsu	23/40

Dead Zone received a score of 23 out of 40 from Famicom Tsūshin (Famitsu).

Cark and Carry from Dead Zone have made appearances in a few games, including Nazoler Land 3 (1988), the strategy game Barcode World (1992) for Famicom (as SD characters), and the puzzle game Shanghai Musume: Mahjong Girls (2011) for iOS and Android.
