= Barcode World =

1992 video game

- Box art
- Developer: Epoch
- Publisher: Sunsoft
- Platform: Family Computer
- Release: JP: December 18, 1992
- Genre: Strategy
- Mode: Single-player

Barcode World (バーコードワールド) is a video game developed by Epoch and published by Sunsoft for the Famicom in 1992.

== Summary ==
This video game was released exclusively in Japan on December 18, 1992 for the Nintendo Family Computer. Players use a Barcode Battler II (a card-scanning handheld) together with a Nintendo-licensed Famicom-Barcode Battler interface that came packaged with the game and not sold separately. A special set of Barcode Battler cards with barcodes imprinted on them were also required to play the game including the "White Card" that enabled players to scan any barcode (especially ones found on consumer products).

Barcode World includes barcode cards that feature characters from many Sunsoft series, most notably Hebereke and Gimmick!, but using the White Card included with the game, players were also given the ability to scan a wide range of consumer products. Released during a period of great interest in barcode-swiping games in Japan, the game dates itself as directly from the early 1990s, but the game still functions today exactly as it did then and modern products may also be scanned in order to generate new content for the game (RPG-style stats and attributes, etc.).

== Legacy ==
The use of the Barcode Battler unit in conjunction with the Famicom was made possible using the Famicom-Barcode Battler interface – a connector cable that came with the Barcode World cassette. In this way, the Famicom was given the capacity to scan external barcodes to expand gameplay for the game to include all manner of household consumer products. Soon books were released by third parties that listed in detail which consumer products had the strongest barcodes. Today, the setup has been seen as a precursor to the 2001 Nintendo e-Reader for the Game Boy Advance. The two devices are very similar in that they serve the same purpose: to scan specially designed cards with barcodes imprinted on them as the primary means of using the device. The game continues to be played today often in emulated form, and modern emulators like FCEUX feature support specifically for the unusual Barcode World setup.

== See also ==
- Nintendo e-Reader
- Sunsoft
- List of Famicom games
