= Firework Thrower Kantaro's 53 Stations of the Tokaido =

1986 video game

- Japanese box art
- Developer: Sunsoft
- Publisher: Sunsoft
- Platform: Famicom
- Release: JP: July 3, 1986
- Genre: Action-adventure
- Modes: Single-player, multiplayer

Firework Thrower Kantaro's 53 Stations of the Tokaido (Note: Japanese: かんしゃく玉投げカン太郎の東海道五十三次, Hepburn: Kanshaku tamanage Kantarō no Tōkaidō Gojūsan-tsugi) is an action-adventure game developed and published by Sunsoft for the Famicom. The game was released in Japan on July 3, 1986 and has been re-released for several other platforms in video game compilations.

The first re-release was made on June 29, 2001 for the Microsoft Windows operating system as part of the Ultra 2000 Sunsoft Classic Games 2 compilation. The game was also coupled with Ikki, and its value version release, YuYu Sunsoft Kessaku-shu 2 (released on July 2, 2004), and Memorial Series Sunsoft Vol. 3 for the PlayStation (released on December 27, 2001) which also included The Wing of Madoola, another Sunsoft game. It was released for the Virtual Console only in Japan on October 14, 2008 for the Wii and on September 18, 2013 for the Nintendo 3DS. The game was released outside of Japan for the first time through SUNSOFT is Back! Retro Game Selection, under its translated name and including a new English localization. Hamster Corporation released the game as part of their Console Archives series for the Nintendo Switch 2 and PlayStation 5 in June 2026.

== Synopsis ==
Kantaro (カン太郎), who has completed his training in the city of Kyoto and seeks to return to his fiancée, Momoko-chan (ももこちゃん), who lives in Edo, but the evil merchant Gonzaemon (剛左衛門) seeks to steal the secrets of fireworks manufacturing from Kantaro, and summons his cronies to harass him as he makes his way through the Tōkaidō route.

== Gameplay ==
The player controls Kantaro, who must pass through various side-scrolling levels while fending off enemies throwing firework grenades. Some enemies are unaffected by grenades, and can only be killed off by explosions from grenades planted on the ground; some are impervious to all of Kantaro's weapons and must be avoided. Various non-player characters attempt to hinder Kantaro's progress, including a prostitute and a ghost who decrease Kantaro's speed, a thief who steals all items held by Kantaro and a border patrol officer, but various items, including a kanzashi, an ofuda and a katana can allow the player to avoid conflict with these characters. Koban are collected throughout the levels and is generally used for creating bridges over rivers. A set amount must be paid to the border patrol officer if the passport item is not present, with secret passages to other levels costing more. An onigiri grants the player temporary invincibility and transforms Kantaro into a ball, allowing him to roll over enemies. A geta allows Kantaro to traverse on clouds.
