= Gimmick! 2 =

2024 video game

- Official artwork
- Developer: Bitwave Games
- Publishers: Sunsoft; Clear River Games
- Director: Niklas Istenes
- Producers: Marcus Ingvarsson; Marco Podda
- Composers: David Wise; Joel Bille
- Series: Gimmick!
- Engine: Unreal Engine 5
- Platforms: Microsoft Windows; Linux; Nintendo Switch; PlayStation 4 PlayStation 5 Xbox One; Xbox Series X/S
- Release: PC, Switch; WW: September 5, 2024; PlayStation 4, PlayStation 5, Xbox One, Xbox Series X/S; JP: December 19, 2024; WW: January 30, 2025
- Genres: Platformer, action-adventure
- Mode: Single-player

Gimmick! 2 (Note: Japanese: ギミック！ 2, Hepburn: Gimikku! 2) is a 2024 platform game developed by Bitwave Games and published by Sunsoft and Clear River Games. Gimmick! 2 was released on September 5, 2024, for Windows, Linux, and Nintendo Switch, with PlayStation 4, PlayStation 5 and Xbox Series X/S versions releasing in Japan on December 19, 2024, and worldwide on January 30, 2025. It is the sequel to Gimmick!, a platform game released in 1992 for the Nintendo Entertainment System. The game follows Yumetaro in a magical journey to rescue the young daughter of his former companion, a girl who has since grown up and passed Yumetaro to her child.

The game was conceived by Niklas Istenes, a devoted fan of the original game, who founded the Swedish video game company Bitwave Games to introduce the series to modern audiences. It later got acquired by Embracer Group, which partnered with Sunsoft, following their initial resistance to make the game due to Bitwave's lack of industry experience. Gimmick! 2 received generally positive reviews from critics, who praised the preservation of its difficulty.

== Gameplay ==
Gimmick! 2 is a 2D action-adventure platform game that follows the protagonist Yumetaro (Note: Japanese: ゆめたろー, Hepburn: Yumetarō), who embarks on a magical journey to rescue the young daughter of his former companion, a girl who has since grown up and passed Yumetaro to her child. When the child is mysteriously taken away, Yumetaro leaps through a portal to save her.

The game retains much of the original game's mechanics, though the classic sprite-based visuals have been upgraded to high-resolution graphics and the removal of the score, item, and life systems. The core gameplay revolves around mastering star-conjuring techniques, allowing the player to take down enemies, turn switches, and also ride on it to reach hidden collectibles that require precise timing and aiming. Yumetaro can also jump, and run.

The game can be played in an easier "assisted mode" or, in the more challenging "Gimmick!" mode, which stays true to the original game's level of difficulty.

== Development ==
Gimmick! 2 was developed by Bitwave Games and published by Sunsoft and Clear River Games. 1992's Gimmick! originally gained limited recognition due to its restricted release in Japan and Scandinavia, but it became highly regarded by NES enthusiasts and industry figures like Shigeru Miyamoto and Masahiro Sakurai for its advanced mechanics, unique level design, and the technical feat of its physics-based star mechanic.

30 years after the release of Gimmick!, Swedish developer and game director Niklas Istenes—a devoted fan of the original game—has been dedicated to reviving the classic by creating a sequel. Istenes founded Bitwave Games with the ambition of reintroducing Gimmick! to modern audiences. Initially, however, his efforts to acquire the rights from Sunsoft were met with resistance, largely due to Bitwave's lack of industry experience. The opportunity for a renewed partnership with Sunsoft arose after Embracer Group, a prominent Swedish video game company acquired Bitwave, which pitched the game. This acquisition strengthened Bitwave's credibility and allowed Istenes to approach Sunsoft once more, this time successfully securing the rights to develop Gimmick! 2. Many of Bitwave's staff had not known about the original game when it was developed, due to its obscurity. During Embracer's significant restructuring in 2023, layoffs threatened the project's continuity. Lead programmer Olof Karlsson, who had previously taken leave due to burnout, returned to the team, motivated by their collective dedication to bring the sequel to life. In an effort to stay true to Gimmick!'s core experience, the team chose to streamline gameplay, focusing on the essential elements that defined the original and reducing any extraneous features.

David Wise created the soundtrack for Gimmick! 2. The soundtrack was recorded live in Sweden in collaboration with Joel Bille and creatively overseen by Pelle Cahndlerby. The game's music features both remixes of tracks from the original Gimmick! and new compositions, incorporating live-recorded instruments that blend traditional Swedish sounds, like the nyckelharpa, with Japanese musical influences to honor the game's Japanese roots.

== Release ==
Gimmick! 2 was first revealed in June 2024, and was later showcased at Gamescom in August 21–25. The creator of the original Gimmick!, Tomomi Sakai, was not involved in the development of Gimmick! 2, since he had left Sunsoft years prior. He only learned about the project when it was publicly announced, for which Bitwave Games later issued an apology. Despite the setbacks, Bitwave Games succeeded in releasing both a rerelease of the original Gimmick!, titled Gimmick! Special Edition on July 6, 2023, and Gimmick! 2, on PC and Nintendo Switch on September 5, 2024. It was also released on PlayStation 4, PlayStation 5, Xbox One and Xbox Series X/S in Japan on December 19, 2024, and worldwide on January 30, 2025. Along with a physical release for PS5 and Switch.

== Reception ==
Reception

Aggregate scores
Aggregator	Score
Metacritic	NS: 80/100
OpenCritic	75% recommend

Review scores
Publication	Score
Famitsu	29/40
Nintendo Life	8/10
TouchArcade	4.5/5
Digitally Downloaded	4/5

Much like its predecessor in retrospect, Gimmick! 2 was well received from critics, gaining "generally favorable" for the Nintendo Switch version, based on 7 reviews from critics, according to the review aggregation website Metacritic. Fellow review aggregator OpenCritic assessed that the game received Strong approval, being recommended by 75% of critics.

The game's presentation, particularly its updated graphics and music, was generally praised by the reviewers. Nile Bowie of Nintendo Life considered its art style to be clean and highly polished, while acknowledging its resemblance to Cut the Rope Bowie also praised its soundtrack, adding to its ambience and immersion, without being "intrusive". Alex Kidman of Digitally Downloaded called its soundtrack "jaunty", while he described the updated visuals compared to its predecessor as a change from "the best-the-hardware-could-do approach of its Famicom forebear to a gentler but quite nice hand drawn animated style."
