= Keisan Game =

Sansū Series, Keisan Game (Arithmetic series, Calculation Game)
- Genre(s): Edutainment
- Publisher(s): Tokyo Shoseki
- Platform(s): Family Computer

Keisan Game Sansū Series (Calculation Game: Arithmetic series) is a video game series focusing on elementary arithmetic calculation of basic math, featuring addition, subtraction, multiplication, division, decimals, and fractions. The series is only available in Japanese.

== Sansū 1-nen: Keisan Game ==
Sansū 1-nen: Keisan Game (けいさんゲーム さんすう1年 ＋−×÷; "Calculation Game: Arithmetic for First Graders") is the first in a series of arithmetic learning video games for the Nintendo Family Computer. It was released April 25, 1986.

This particular game focuses on the basics of addition (たしざん) and subtraction (ひきざん), with one and two digits only.

As a video game primarily meant for educational purposes, there is very little variety between the four modes of the game. Half of the modes are for addition, while the other half are for subtraction. These modes each contain short mini-games where the player must solve the displayed math problems. Even though this game is educational, players can only incorrectly answer five times before a game over.

This methodology of learning replicated the "sink or swim" philosophy of teaching and would be used in the later games.

== Sansū 2-nen: Keisan Game ==
Sansū 2-nen: Keisan Game (けいさんゲーム 算数2年 ＋−×÷; "Calculation Game: Arithmetic for Second Graders") is the second in a series of arithmetic learning video games for the Nintendo Family Computer.

Unlike the first game in the series, the core focus of this video game is on addition (たしざん). More advanced versions of subtraction (ひきざん) and multiplication (かけざん) are also included to teach all four basic functions of arithmetics.

Intended to be an educational video game, there is little variety to this video game. Variations for one-player (ひとりでやる) and two-player (ふたりでやる) games are included. Even though this game is educational, players can only incorrectly guess five times before "dying" and being given a game over message. This methodology of learning replicated the "sink or swim" philosophy of teaching.

Math problems included with this game allow players to play on a golf course (but with slightly different rules than a regular game of golf), work in a robot factory, and fill the multiplication table full of basic multiplication facts.

== Sansū 3-nen: Keisan Game ==
Sansū 3-nen: Keisan Game (けいさんゲーム 算数3年 ＋−×÷; "Calculation Game: Arithmetic for Third Graders") is the third in a series of arithmetic learning video games for the Nintendo Family Computer.

The core focus on this video game is exclusively on multiplication (かけざん) and division (わりざん). No addition or subtraction facts are taught in this game. Primarily meant for educational purposes, there is little variety.

Four modes are utilized, two for multiplication and two for division. These game modes contain short minigames where solving the displayed math problems correctly results in positive feedback. The division rounds allow players to control a submarine, while the multiplication rounds allow the players to become space cadets and car drivers. Only five incorrect answers and being hit by "enemy" are accepted before the game prematurely ends. Dividing by zero appears to be expected by the player in the game, simply resulting in an answer of zero.

Variations for one-player (ひとりでやる) and two-player (ふたりでやる) games are included with all the four modes of play.

== Sansū 4-nen: Keisan Game ==
Sansū 4-nen: Keisan Game (けいさんゲーム 算数4年 ＋−×÷; "Calculation Game: Arithmetic for Fourth Graders") is a Family Computer educational video game that was released on October 30, 1986.

This video game is an educational game teaching four basic principles: division, adding/subtracting decimals, adding/subtracting fractions and multiplying/dividing decimals. Each minigame has two difficulty levels and allows for two players to take turns playing the minigames.

In the "Division" and "Decimal Addition & Subtraction" challenges, players have to control a man as he tries to destroy monsters inside a dungeon with a sword. An unbeatable ghost runs outside the building; it cannot be defeated with the sword and will instantly defeat the character if touched. Touching the wrong number answer will instantly cost a life. Climbing to the top of the building results in more math questions being asked. The other challenges result in having to control a race car as it navigates through a complex labyrinth. Players must find the exit tile while avoiding rival drivers in order to access the next math question.

Reference:Sansu 4-nen: Keisan Game

== Sansū 5+6 Toshi: Keisan Game ==
Reference:Sansu 5・6-nen: Keisan Game
