= Ikki (video game) =

1985 video game

- Arcade flyer
- Developers: Sunsoft; Tose (FC)
- Publisher: Sunsoft
- Designer: Mr. "K"
- Platforms: Arcade, Family Computer
- Release: Arcade: JP: July 1985; Famicom: JP: November 28, 1985
- Genre: Top-down shooter
- Modes: Single-player, multiplayer

Ikki (Note: いっき, Ikki; lit. 'riot', 'revolt', or 'insurrection') is a 1985 top-down shooter video game developed and published by Sunsoft for arcades. A port developed by Tose for the Famicom was negatively received.

The game was re-released as part of multiple compilations. A mobile phone version was published in September 2003. A renewed version titled Ikki Mobile was released over the SoftBank Mobile and EZweb networks in July 2006. A revival of the game, titled Ikki Unite, was released in 2023.

== Gameplay ==
Ikki is set in medieval Japan, where a poor farming village is planning an insurrection to overthrow their feudal overlord, but the only participants in the revolt are the player's character, Gonbe (ごんべ), and the optional second-player character, Tago (田吾), and the player battles against an army of ninjas instead of samurai and foot soldiers. The game displays text in the vertical direction, which was very unusual for a game of the period, and all in-game messages use speech reminiscent of jidaigeki films.

Arcade screenshot

The character's movement is controlled with an 8-way joystick, and pressing the single button allows the player to attack by throwing a sickle. The direction in which the sickle is thrown cannot be determined by the player, and the weapon will automatically head towards the closest enemy. This forces an emphasis on avoiding attacks rather than attacking aggressively. The right side of the screen displays the player's points, along with a map of the level. The location of koban coins is displayed on this map, but players must circumvent walls and other barriers to go to those locations. This map is not included in the Famicom version of the game.

Enemy characters include a black or red ninja, bomber ninja, and wild boar (some of these enemies do not appear in the Famicom version). Red ninjas move faster than all of the other characters and are harder to hit, but yield twice as many points. The player loses a life when they come in contact with any of the enemy characters or projectiles. The game ends when the player loses with no lives remaining. A ghost (or yōkai) will also appear on occasion, and the player will be unable to throw their sickle if they come in contact with it. The ghost's effect will dissipate if the player touches the jizō or komainu statues which are present on some levels. A grotesque handmaiden may also appear on some levels, and coming in contact with this handmaiden will prevent the player from moving for a short period of time. Though the player can still attack with the sickle in this condition, it becomes impossible to dodge enemy projectiles, making it very difficult to progress. The handmaiden character does not appear in the i-appli mobile phone version.

A level is completed when the player picks up all eight gold koban coins which are spread throughout the map, or if they capture the daikan (Japanese feudal lord) that can randomly appear during the level. There are eight levels included in the original game, and the Famicom version contains four levels, with four more secret levels where the location of the coins is changed. The player returns to the first level after all eight levels are completed. Completing the cycle twice ends the game in the i-appli version, but the player can continue the game indefinitely in the Famicom version.

The opening animation was not included and the number of levels was decreased to half the original number in the Famicom version, but several new items were made available. The bamboo spear allows the player to attack by thrusting the spear forwards, but players cannot throw the sickle or attack in other directions during this time. This becomes a disadvantage against enemies that use projectiles, so it is advantageous to ignore the item on some levels. Eating a daikon (Japanese radish) increase the player's speed, and obtaining an emakimono (Japanese scroll) gives the player an additional life. The leaf item allows the player to duplicate and become invincible, but their attack power remains the same. The smoke item allows the player to advance to the bonus level after completing the current level.

A senryōbako (Japanese treasure chest) appears in non-Famicom versions of the game, and the character's animated expression changes to laughter when it is obtained, but the player cannot move while this animation lasts, making them vulnerable to projectile attacks. Like the bamboo spear in the Famicom version, the treasure chest can actually hinder the player's progress, but the bamboo spear awards the player bonus points when obtained, and the number of points gained by killing enemies increases while the player is in possession of the spear.

Players can advance to the bonus level if they obtain an onigiri. In the Famicom version, the bonus level is accessed by obtaining the smoke item from the jizō statues. The bonus level is played by catching onigiri thrown in random trajectories by a sennin. The player gains bonus points for every onigiri that they manage to catch, and an extra life is awarded if the player successfully catches all 10 onigiri. The character's slow movement however makes it difficult to catch all 10 onigiri unless the players cooperate in the multiplayer mode.

In the mobile phone version, the narrower width of the game screen makes it easier for the player to catch all 10 onigiri, but the onigiri are thrown at a noticeably faster speed. This type of bonus game became a fixture for SunSoft products, and appears in other games like Dead Zone (1986) and Tenka no Goikenban: Mito Kōmon (1987).

The Famicom version consists of four different levels, with the fifth level being an alternate version of the first, the sixth being an alternate version of the second, and so on. The difficulty gradually increases as the game progresses, and the game levels loop infinitely. There is no ending screen for the game, and completion of level 99 brings the player to level 00, which is an alternate version of the fourth level. The player returns to level 01 after completing level 00. A "secret letter" appears on-screen after each of the first 8 levels in the Famicom version. The secret letters displayed are E, R, A, W, T, F, O, S, in order, and if the letters are read backwards as indicated in the game's instruction manual, they form the word "SOFTWARE". This code word was required for the gift campaign that was conducted during the game's initial release.

== Reception ==
Japanese essayist Jun Miura coined the term kuso-gē (クソゲー; lit. "shitty game") after playing the Famicom version of Ikki. Regardless, the game still sold reasonably well and was one of Sunsoft's most popular products at the time. Game Machine listed Ikki on their August 15, 1985 issue as being the tenth most-popular arcade game at the time.

== Legacy ==
Its main character, Gonbe, makes a cameo appearance in Atlantis no Nazo, another Sunsoft game.

=== Re-releases ===
The game was re-released for Microsoft Windows as part of the Ultra2000 Sunsoft Classic games compilation, which was released on June 29, 2001. The game has also been coupled with Firework Thrower Kantaro's 53 Stations of the Tokaido and Yūyū Sunsoft kessaku-sen 2 (released on July 2, 2004), and was coupled with Super Arabian for the PlayStation compilation Memorial Series Sunsoft Vol. 1. This compilation was also released for the PlayStation Network download service for the PlayStation 3.

An updated version supporting up to 12 players was released as Ikki Online (いっき おんらいん) on June 29, 2010 for the PlayStation 3. It was discontinued in November 2022.

The arcade version was re-released on Virtual Console on January 16, 2007 for the Wii, on February 13, 2013, for the Nintendo 3DS, and on May 22, 2013 for the Wii U. Hamster Corporation released the game as part of their Arcade Archives series for the PlayStation 4 in 2016 and Nintendo Switch in 2018.

=== Ikki Mobile ===
The mobile version of Ikki, titled Ikki Mobile (いっき萌バイル, ikki mobairu) was released by SunSoft in July 2006, for the SoftBank Mobile and EZweb mobile phone networks. Though the content is identical to that of the previous versions, Ikki Mobile contains a series of minigames and a moe drawing trading card series, which can be purchased using the coins collected in the main game. The mobile version consists of 7 different levels, and several changes were made to the characters and graphics. The handmaiden character was revived from the i-appli version, and the bamboo spear has the added effect of deflecting enemy projectiles. The ghost enemy is no longer invincible, and the ninja and handmaiden change to kunoichi and princesses, respectively, as the game progresses.

The four minigames become available after the player has completed the 7-level cycle at least once. The first is a slot machine game, where up to 3 coins can be bet at one time. The second is a concentration game that requires 10 coins to play. Up to 5 mistakes are allowed per game, and picking the lucky card gives the player 10 bonus coins. The third game is a frog derby game, where the player bets up to 10 coins on the winning frog. The last minigame is the onigiri catching game that was the bonus level in the Famicom version. It also requires 10 coins to play. Though the content is mostly the same, it is impossible to catch all 10 onigiri, as some are thrown off the borders of the game screen. Small and large gold coins are thrown in addition to the onigiri, and 5 onigiri count for 1 gold coin while 5 small gold coins count for 1 large gold coin.

The gold coins collected during the game can also be used to buy packages of the in-game trading card series (capturing a feudal lord in the mobile version yields a bonus of 10 gold coins). Three random cards are included in each card package, and a set of card consists of 16 different cards. Each set of cards creates a single illustration, and the main game's difficulty increases every 48 cards collected. Completing two sets allows the player to access a special webpage from the title screen, where mobile wallpaper can be downloaded after a short survey.

=== Ikki Unite ===
A Sunsoft-developed revival of the game titled Ikki Unite was released for Microsoft Windows on February 15, 2023.

=== Other media ===
==== Manga ====
- In 1986, Ikki was adapted as a manga by Sawada Yukio and published by Wan Pakku Comics, released as a story in the anthology series Hisshō Tekunikku Kan Peki-ban (進必勝テクニック完ペキ版)
- Ikki was adapted as a manga titled Susume!! Seigaku Dennou Kenkyuubu (進め！！静学電脳研究部), published in the Gamest Comics collection from April 1999, drawn by Kouta Hirano.

==== Novel ====
- The novel いっき ーLEGEND OF TAKEYARI MASTERー (ISBN 978-4-89199-159-3), featuring all-new characters, was released by Sunsoft and Hifumi Shobo in 2013. A promotional video was released for the book.

=== Other appearances ===
Gonbe appeared in the Shanghai Musume: Mahjong Girls for the iOS and Android in 2011, including a Sunsoft Characters. Gonbe also appeared as a Joker card in Moe Moe Daifūgō ~Zenkoku Bishōjo Meguri~ for the iOS and Android in 2012.

The setting and characters of Ikki are featured in Blaster Master Zero 2, an entry in Sunsoft's Blaster Master series developed and published by Inti Creates. Gonbei and Tae (based on their depictions from the 2013 novelization) are featured as Metal Attacker pilots on the planet Montoj, where they ally with protagonists Jason Frudnick and Eve to defeat the Mutant Overlord "Zavira" (from Atlantis no Nazo) that had taken over the planet.
