= Arabian (video game) =

1983 video game

- North American arcade flyer
- Developer: Sun Electronics
- Publishers: JP: Sun Electronics; NA: Atari, Inc.
- Platforms: Arcade, Famicom
- Release: Arcade: NA: May 1983; JP: June 1983; Famicom: JP: July 25, 1985
- Genre: Platform
- Modes: Single-player, multiplayer

Arabian (Note: Japanese: アラビアン) is a 1983 platform video game developed and published by Sun Electronics for arcades. It was released in North America in May 1983 by Atari, Inc. and in Japan in June 1983. A Famicom version was developed and released by Sunsoft only in Japan as Super Arabian. (Note: Japanese: スーパーアラビアン) A distinct port for home computers developed by Interceptor Software was released as Tales of the Arabian Nights.

== Gameplay ==
Gameplay

Arabian is a platform game where the player assumes the role of an adventurous Arabian prince whose goal is to rescue the princess from her palace. During his quest, the prince will sail seas, crawl through caves, and fly magic carpets. On the way, the player must find and take the letters 'A'-'R'-'A'-'B'-'I'-'A'-'N'. Although the player character is described as an Arabian boy, the game is set to take place in Persia.

The game plays out in the form of chapters of a book.

== Release ==
In magazine advertisements, Arabian was promoted by Eric Ginner, the world record holder for Millipede and Liberator at the time.

Tales of the Arabian Nights by Interceptor Software was a port of Arabian published in 1984/5 for the Acorn Electron, Amstrad CPC, BBC Micro, Commodore 64, and ZX Spectrum.

=== Re-releases ===
Super Arabian was re-released in a two-in-one Sony PlayStation game in 2001, Memorial Series Sunsoft Vol.1, which also included Ikki. Hamster Corporation re-released the game as part of the Arcade Archives series for the Nintendo Switch and PlayStation 4 in October 2020. The Famicom version was also re-released as part the Sunsoft Collection 1 compilation cartridge for the Evercade in September 2023.

== Reception ==
In Japan, Game Machine listed Arabian on their July 15, 1983 issue as being the fifth most-successful new table arcade unit of the month. In the United States, it had sold at least 1,950 arcade cabinets by July 1983.
