= Gimmick! =

1992 platform video game

- Japanese Family Computer box art
- Developer: Sunsoft (Note: Special Edition co-developed by City Connection and Empty Clip Studios)
- Publisher: Sunsoft
- Director: Tomomi Sakai
- Designer: Tomomi Sakai
- Programmer: Tomomi Sakai
- Artists: Tomomi Sakai; Hiroyuki Kagoya
- Composer: Masashi Kageyama
- Series: Gimmick!
- Platform: Nintendo Entertainment System
- Release: JP: January 31, 1992; SCN: May 19, 1993
- Genre: Platform
- Mode: Single-player

Gimmick! (Note: Japanese: ギミック!, Hepburn: Gimikku!), released in Scandinavia as Mr. Gimmick, is a platform video game developed and published by Sunsoft, and originally released in Japan for the Famicom in 1992. The story follows a small green creature named Yumetaro who was mistakenly given as a toy to a young girl. After the girl's toys come to life and whisk the girl away to another dimension, Yumetaro gives chase to save her. Playing as Yumetaro, the player must maneuver through a variety of levels, using the protagonist's star-shooting power to defeat enemies and progress through the game.

In order for Gimmick! to rival the quality of games on the then-new Super Famicom, director Tomomi Sakai required a large staff and used innovative techniques to create high-quality graphics and sound. The graphics were handled using advanced tileset algorithms which freed processing power so more detailed graphics could be drawn on the screen. The game uses a Sunsoft 5B expansion sound chip, which provides expanded sound capabilities compared to a standard Famicom game cartridge and enabled composer Masashi Kageyama to create a more advanced score. The soundtrack crosses multiple genres, with Kageyama describing it as a "compilation of game music".

Gimmick! received mixed reviews and a lack of interest at release. Distributors were more interested in games for the new 16-bit systems, so Sakai found difficulty in getting the game localized outside Japan. Sunsoft of America did not approve of the game for a North American release due to its quirky character design. Ultimately, the only distributor that imported the game was Swedish distributor Bergsala, which released it in 1993 for the Nintendo Entertainment System in small quantities across the Scandinavian market. Critics both praised and criticized the game for its difficulty, and some thought the game was designed exclusively for children due to its character design. In retrospective reviews, Gimmick! has received more praise. It was re-released in Japan in 2002 for the PlayStation, and a remake developed by exA-Arcadia was released for the exA-Arcadia arcade system in late 2020. An enhanced port was released on July 6, 2023, for Nintendo Switch, PlayStation 4, Windows, and Xbox One.

On June 20, 2024, a sequel was announced titled Gimmick! 2. It was released for Nintendo Switch, PlayStation 4, PlayStation 5, Windows, Xbox One, and Xbox Series X/S on September 5th.

== Synopsis and gameplay ==
Yumetaro's star attack can be used as a platform to reach otherwise inaccessible areas.

Gimmick! is a platform game that places the player in control of a small green creature named Yumetaro (Note: Japanese: ゆめたろー, Hepburn: Yumetarō). The story begins during an unnamed young girl's birthday. Her father is normally busy with work, but he is able to spend time with her family for the special occasion. Earlier, he had gone to the store to purchase a new toy for his daughter. Yumetaro had been wandering the toy store and became confused when her father came in. He hid with stuffed toys that looked like him, but was picked up by the girl's father. When the girl opens the Yumetaro gift, she is delighted. Yumetaro becomes the girl's favorite, and so her other toys no longer feel loved. One night, the toys come alive and take the girl to another dimension. The only one left is Yumetaro, who follows the toys in search of her.

The player, as Yumetaro, must venture into the alternate dimension to rescue his new owner. The player character can jump and spawn stars above the horn on his head. The star is a central mechanic to the game, being necessary to defeat enemies found while also doubling as a platform, capable of being ridden to reach otherwise inaccessible areas. The player must make their way through six stages and six bosses to complete the game. Once the sixth boss is defeated, it is revealed that the girl is still missing and the game restarts from the beginning. To complete Gimmick!, the player must find a hidden area in each stage where a magic item resides. If all magic items are collected without using a continue, a secret stage appears in which an extra boss must be beaten. After this boss is defeated a cutscene is shown depicting Yumetaro rescuing his owner and leading her back to the real world.

== Development ==
Gimmick! was conceived by lead designer Tomomi Sakai, who put a variety of ideas into the programming of the game, such as making it in the style of an arcade game, with the gameplay occurring within the upper part of the screen and the score displayed in the lower part. The game may have been developed with a MicroVAX minicomputer, but Sakai claims he could have made the game how he wanted regardless of what equipment was used. In order to rival the quality of Super Famicom games, a large staff was required. He had always thought about developing his own game with Yoshiaki Iwata and Hiroyuki Kagoya, who were involved in designing Blaster Master, a previous Sunsoft title. The two, however, were paid very little for their involvement in making Gimmick!. The characters were designed by Sakai and Kagoya. Sound programmer Naohisa Morota, who had left Sunsoft shortly before development of Gimmick!, would work for Sakai as an "outsourcer".

The process of using the 256 graphics tiles on the NES was handled with special programming techniques. The team streamlined the process by dividing the number of tiles into two groups of 128 and separating them into enemy characters and protagonists. By further dividing the tiles into four groups of 64, they were able to reduce graphical processing and switch out tilesets to use as background cogs and floor animations. Sakai left Sunsoft prior to the game's release, due to his dissatisfaction with the game's opening being rewritten and his name being removed.

=== Music ===
Sakai and Gimmick!'s composer Masashi Kageyama held meetings over telephone regarding the music, the former being in Nagoya and the latter in Tokyo at the time. With the two having similar musical interests, and Kageyama being able to plug his Macintosh synthesizer into the phone, it was easy for Kageyama to share with Sakai how the music sounded. Even though Kageyama had already felt comfortable with the musical layout and controls he used for two PC Engine games, Out Live and Benkei Gaiden, Sakai provided him with extended sound sources. Sakai encouraged Kageyama to push the limits of the sound chips, and so Kageyama used the maximum amount of sound channels possible. He jokingly described composing the music for Gimmick! as feeling more like "putting a puzzle together than actual music composition."

Gimmick!'s soundtrack ranges in several different genres, from pop music to bass-driven acid jazz, fantasia, dramatic hard rock and jazz fusion, a style not commonly heard in games released for the NES or Famicom. Because Kageyama knew children would listen to the music in the games he worked on, he wanted to make it sound as beautiful as possible, influenced by the natural environments in Shizuoka as well as the various kinds of music he listened to, such as that of George Benson. The other staff members' love for music was the most influential aspect for Kageyama. Some requested a pop sound for the music, while others requested a wide range of other genres. One designer was a fan of techno and minimalist music, and one programmer enjoyed classical music. Since players would often listen to game compositions more than once, Kageyama did not want the stage tracks to become grating and wanted the opening and ending compositions to sound dramatic, overall being "careful to make sure [he] was writing music that just felt good." His score was also influenced by the "perfect" control for Gimmick! that Sakai was fixated on designing.

Describing the game's soundtrack as a "compilation of game music", Kageyama said that making it was a test in trying to "take what people generally considered to be the sound of the Famicom, and kick it up a notch." Naohisa Morota handled the sound programming, and Kageyama described his contributions as "profound" and helpful in one of his goals in making the tracks sound more like a live performance than just compositions. The Famicom version used a variation of Sunsoft's FME-7 memory management controller known as "SUNSOFT 5B", which, in addition to the functionality provided by the stock FME-7, features a Yamaha YM2149 PSG audio chip to provide three additional channels for music and sound. Since the NES doesn't support extra on-cartridge audio chips, the music was adapted to only use the standard five sound channels of the NES in the European release. Kageyama died on September 5, 2025, at the age of 62, following his struggle with stomach cancer.

== Release ==
Gimmick! was released in Japan on 31 January 1992, with plans for an international release underway. The game was reviewed by Electronic Gaming Monthly (July 1992) in North America, and a release window of the second half of 1992 was provided. However, plans for a North American localization were soon cancelled. Sunsoft of America's former vice president of development, David Siller, claimed that the company's managers felt the game's characters were too "strange or quirky" compared to cartoons by The Walt Disney Company and Warner Bros. Ufouria: The Saga suffered this same fate. However, Siller said that the two titles most likely could have been commercial successes.

The international version was imported by Bergsala AB into Scandinavian countries in small amounts and was retitled Mr. Gimmick. It was released on 19 May 1993. Unlike its Japanese counterpart, this version featured eight lives instead of four. The version also contained downgraded music, due to the lack of an expanded sound channel chip. Since the European cartridge is encoded for PAL regions, the game would not work properly on a North American NTSC NES due to graphical glitches, but an identical NTSC prototype ROM has been leaked online which functions properly.

Gimmick! was also ported to the PlayStation in Japan as a part of Sunsoft Memorial Collection: Volume 6 along with Super Spy Hunter. This version contains some sound differences from its Famicom counterpart. This collection package was made available on the PlayStation Network in Japan on 22 December 2010. The Japanese version of the game has since become a collector's item, with a United Kingdom guide in 2014 listing the game as costing £320.

A remake, titled Gimmick! Exact Mix, developed by exA-Arcadia and was released for the exA-Arcadia arcade platform on 31 December 2020. That same year, iam8bit officially released the game's soundtrack on CD. An enhanced port of the original game titled Gimmick! Special Edition, was originally announced as releasing in 2022 for Nintendo Switch, PlayStation 4, Windows, and Xbox One. It was developed by City Connection and Empty Clip Studios and was set to be published by City Connection in Japan and by Bitwave Games in the west. A physical edition is set to release via distributor Clear River Games. In September 2022, City Connection and Bitwave Games announced that the release of the special edition would be delayed until "early 2023." On Tuesday, May 9, 2023; Swedish publisher BitWave Games announced that Gimmick! Special Edition would be released on July 6, 2023. On Thursday, June 1, 2023; Evercade announced that they would include the game with their Sunsoft Collection Vol. 1.

== Reception ==
Reception

Review scores
Publication	Score
Electronic Gaming Monthly	5/10, 8/10, 5/10, 4/10
Famitsu	7/10, 8/10, 5/10, 6/10
Nintendo Magazine System	91/100
Nintendomagasinet	6/10

Gimmick! initially garnered lackluster interest and mixed reviews from publications like Famitsu, Electronic Gaming Monthly, and Nintendomagasinet. Sakai blamed this lack of popularity on casual players being unable to handle the difficulty, and the industry's transition to newer 16-bit consoles like the Super Famicom and Mega Drive. When Gimmick! was exhibited at places like the Tokyo Toy Show, Sakai recalled that he was hoping a dealer would see Gimmick! as a next-generation title developed for the original Nintendo and distribute it, only for them to lose interest once they learned it was a Famicom game. In retrospect, he joked that the game took 10 years for people to appreciate.

Critics from Swedish magazine Nintendomagasinet found Gimmick! to be reminiscent of Sunsoft's own Ufouria: The Saga. They felt it was ultimately an average platformer, and noted the game's cute design would be appealing to children. Three reviewers from Electronic Gaming Monthly shared these sentiments regarding the game's average quality and cute design. A fourth reviewer gave a more positive review, calling the game a sleeper hit and stating the game becomes very challenging at the later levels and requires great technique to master. The most favorable review at the time came from Nintendo Magazine System, where the critics called it one of the best NES games they had played in a while. The reviewers highly praised the visuals, sound and difficulty of the game, with one reviewer saying that the desire to complete the game trumps over any such problems it has.

In a retrospective analysis, GameSpot's Jonathan Toyad highlighted Gimmick! as an underrated platform title from the 1990s. He praised the physics and unique level design. Regarding the graphics, he stated them to be the "prettiest and most detailed" from the NES era. Toyad's only negative comment was regarding the extreme difficulty in reaching the final stage and good ending. He concluded that Gimmick! was a "labor of love" from developers, and found it a shame it was not released in North America. IGN listed it among their top ten NES games of all time, praising the game's physics engine and writing that its platforming excellence stands out among the console's best.
