= Sun Corporation =

Japanese electronics company

- Native name: サン電子株式会社
- Romanized name: Sansofuto
- Type: Public KK
- Traded as: TYO: 6736
- ISIN: JP3336450006
- Industry: Electronics, Video games
- Founded: April 16, 1971; 55 years ago
- Founder: Masami Maeda
- Headquarters: Nagoya, Aichi, Japan
- Key people: Ryusuke Utsumi (CEO)
- Products: List of Sunsoft video games
- Brands: Sunsoft
- Number of employees: 209
- Divisions: Sunsoft
- Subsidiaries: Bacsoft; Bloom Techno; Cellebrite eDream Corporation; EKTECH Holdings
- Website: www.sun-denshi.co.jp/eng/

Sun Corporation (Note: Japanese: サン電子株式会社, Hepburn: Sun Denshi Kabushikigaisha) is a Japanese electronics manufacturer, video game developer and publisher. It is known for its video games under the "Sunsoft" division.

== History ==
In April 1971, Sun Electronics Corporation (alternatively called Sun Denshi) was founded in Kōnan, Aichi as a manufacturer and vendor of electronics equipment. Electronic products, especially personal computers by the company with no relation to video games were initially released under the Suntac brand. The company went public on JASDAQ on March 20, 2002. The company moved their headquarters to Nagoya in 2018, while an office remained at Kōnan to handle its video games business. It still manufactures electronics equipment to this day, with products utilizing Internet of things, machine-to-machine and business intelligence technology.

=== Video games ===
Sun Corporation's video game brand

Sun Corporation's history in video games began in October 1978 in arcades with two titles: Block Challenger and Block Perfect. Sun Corporation had several arcade hits in the early 1980s such as Arabian, Ikki and Kangaroo. At the time, its arcade video games were released under its own corporate name of Sun Electronics Corporation. Sun Corporation purchased American arcade game publisher Kitkorp in 1985, rebranding it as Sun Corporation of America to release its games internationally.

The Sunsoft brand first appeared in the latter of the 1980s when Sun Corporation began developing original games and technology for the home video game console market, with emphasis mostly on Nintendo's Famicom. Sunsoft had gone international at that time, and it was reputable enough to secure major licenses of the era (such as Batman and The Addams Family). In the 1990s, Sun Corporation of America joined forces with Acclaim Entertainment to handle ad sales rights to Sunsoft's video games for game consoles. Additionally, a number of Sega games, including Fantasy Zone, Fantasy Zone II and After Burner, were ported for Nintendo consoles by Sunsoft. From 1994 to 1998, Sunsoft attempted to join the fighting game craze by releasing four fighting games: Sugoi Hebereke for the Super Famicom (1994), Galaxy Fight: Universal Warriors for the Neo Geo (1995), Waku Waku 7 for the Neo Geo (1996), and Astra Superstars for Sega ST-V-based arcades (1998).

In 1995, Sun Corporation of America heavily restructured in the face of bankruptcy, and all the company's pending projects were either sold to other companies or cancelled. Former Sunsoft producer René Boutin spoke on Sunsoft's problems before he left the company. Boutin explained in an interview that

it was around this time our Director of Development, David Siller, suddenly announced he was leaving to work for Universal Interactive. Then a short time later, in February 1995, the entire staff was called in for a meeting where Sunsoft's president announced that the company was shutting down effective immediately. They kept on a skeleton crew of four or five people to wrap up operations and facilitate transfer of IP over to Acclaim, but that was it for production, QA, and marketing. By this time, Looney Tunes B-Ball was in QA at Nintendo and we had just gotten Speedy Gonzales to beta, so it was about to go as well. It turned out that Sun Corporation had lost millions on some golf course investment in Palm Springs and it cost us all our jobs.

Sun Corporation of America resurfaced with rereleases of old Game Boy titles and new video games for the PlayStation and the Game Boy Color. Citing several factors, like yet-another "next generation" console transition, and high overhead production costs, Sunsoft eventually closed its offices in America and Europe, and initiated a re-organization. Sunsoft has continued to operate out of its corporate headquarters in Japan, developing and publishing role-playing video games, pachinko games and mahjong games, and mobile platform titles in partnership with other companies such as NTT DoCoMo and Yahoo!.

On September 14, 2006, Nintendo announced that Sunsoft was a partner on the Wii's Virtual Console. Although this relationship with Nintendo took more than three years to release any games, on December 4, 2009, Sunsoft announced that it was partnering with GaijinWorks to bring Blaster Master to Virtual Console that month for 500 Wii Points. Also as of December 10, 2009, the company has also acquired Telenet Japan's entire game library. On February 6, 2010, Sunsoft announced the release of Blaster Master: Overdrive for WiiWare, 2 days prior to its release. Afterwards, Sunsoft also released Aero the Acro-Bat, Aero the Acro-Bat 2, and Ufouria: The Saga on Virtual Console.

On December 24, 2021, Sunsoft tweeted to its fans asking for suggestions to remake their old games, after a period of relative inactivity in the gaming space. They have since released games based on past IPs as well as licensed some to external developers to revive the brand.

In March 2024, Sunsoft released Ufouria: The Saga 2 on all 9th generation consoles (Microsoft Windows, PlayStation 5, Xbox Series X/S, and Nintendo Switch).

On September 5, 2024, a sequel of the 1992's Gimmick!, Gimmick! 2 was developed by Bitwave Games was released on 8th and 9th gen consoles (Microsoft Windows, PlayStation 4, Xbox One, PlayStation 5, Xbox Series X/S, and Nintendo Switch). That same September, Sunsoft released a selection of retro titles under the collection SUNSOFT is Back!. SUNSOFT is Back! Retro Game Selection 2 is set to follow in December 2026.

== See also ==
- List of Sunsoft video games
