= Ufouria: The Saga =

1991 video game

- European box art
- Developer: Sunsoft (Note: Ported to mobile phones by Space Out)
- Publisher: Sunsoft
- Designer: Ryōji Uchimichi
- Programmer: Masahito Nomura
- Composer: Naoki Kodaka
- Series: Hebereke
- Platforms: Nintendo Entertainment System, mobile phone, Nintendo Switch, Windows
- Release: NES: JP: September 20, 1991; EU: November 19, 1992; AU: 1992; Mobile phone: JP: August 18, 2003; Nintendo Switch & Windows: WW: March 27, 2024; JP: March 28, 2024
- Genre: Action-adventure
- Mode: Single-player

Ufouria: The Saga (Note: Known in Japan as Hebereke (Japanese: へべれけ; the title is colloquial and roughly translates to "drunk" or "untrustworthy")) is a 1991 action-adventure video game developed and published in Japan and Europe by Sunsoft for the Nintendo Entertainment System. It is the first entry in the Hebereke franchise, where almost every installment in the series features a completely different playstyle. Controlling a humanoid-looking character called Bop-Louie through an interconnected world, the game focuses on exploration and searching for items and power-ups in vein of Metroid and Blaster Master, fighting bosses and minibosses. During gameplay, the player locates the main character's three friends, each of which becomes a playable character and have unique skills that allow the player to reach previously inaccessible areas.

Designed by Ryōji Uchimichi, the game was developed at the Tokyo division of Sunsoft during a period where software houses needed a mascot to represent them. Due to their lack of series and wanting to establish its characters, Sunsoft decided to spawn the title into one. After its Japanese launch, plans for an international release were underway. Ufouria: The Saga was previewed and reviewed in magazines, in addition to being showcased in playable state to attendees at the 1991 WCES, but the North American localization was cancelled after Sunsoft of America did not approve the game due to its quirky character designs. It was released in Europe and Australia in 1992, featuring various alterations when compared with the original Japanese version such as a different story, and characters' names and sprites being changed. Because of a limited release, the European version has become quite in demand, and is considered a sought after item on the game collecting market.

Ufouria: The Saga received mixed reception at release on the NES; critics felt mixed in regards to the audiovisual presentation, low difficulty and gameplay, which drew comparison with Super Mario Bros. 2 due to each character possessing their own abilities, though its originality and use of passwords were commended. Retrospective commentary has been more positive and has since gained a cult following.

The game has since been re-released on numerous platforms and as download services, like the Virtual Console and PlayStation Network. A sequel to the game was released for Microsoft Windows, Nintendo Switch, PlayStation 5 and Xbox Series X/S in early March 2024. An enhanced port, under the name Hebereke: Enjoy Edition released on Switch and Steam later that month.

== Gameplay and premise ==
Screenshot of the first area of the game, showing Bop-Louie jumping on a Teketeke

Ufouria: The Saga is an action-adventure game similar to Metroid. The plot differs between each region; in the original Japanese version, it follows a penguin-like character known as Hebe seeking his colleagues Ō-Chan, Sukezaemon and Jennifer, who fell into time and space during a large-scale war, in order to fight an alien named Unyohn and return to their homeworlds. In the western localization, Bop-Louie and his friends Freeon-Leon, Shades and Gil, are members of the 21st Century family unit called and live in the titular world. Bop-Louie stumbles upon a crater, into which his friends fall. Bop-Louie climbs in, but suddenly blanks out. He finds out that he must find all three of his other friends, all of which suffer from amnesia and take on Bop-Louie as a threat. Once all four are back together, the group must collect three keys by defeating guardians to open a gate and face against Unyohn.

The player controls Bop-Louie (Hebe) through an interconnected free-roaming environment, collecting items, defeating enemies and bosses, and obtaining power-ups. Three of the game's bosses are Bop-Louie's friends, who later become playable characters by defeating them and each one have their own unique skills that allow the player to reach previously inaccessible areas; Freeon-Leon (Ō-Chan) can swim across water and walk on slippery ice surfaces, while Shades (Sukezaemon) can jump high and Gil (Jennifer) can dive underwater. Bop-Louie can also find a special item that allows him to climb walls. The player can switch between characters at any time on the sub-menu.

Every character can attack enemies and bosses by jumping on them while holding the d-pad down. When defeated, enemies will spawn into balloons called "Popoons", which can be thrown at other enemies and bosses. The game has a hit point-based health system, starting at 10 HP but can be expanded by searching life containers and replenished after getting hit by enemies by finding medicines or the "Water of Life". The game is over once the characters' HP is depleted, though the player can continue with their items and characters via a password system.

== Development and release ==
Ufouria: The Saga, known as Hebereke in Japan, was developed at the Tokyo division of Sunsoft during a period where software houses needed a mascot to represent them. Masahito Nomura, who previously worked on Journey to Silius (1990), served as the game's main programmer. The soundtrack was composed by Naoki Kodaka. It was designed by Ryōji Uchimichi, who also created the characters. According to Sunsoft member Atsushi Sakai, Sunsoft wanted to establish its characters and decided to spawn Hebereke into a franchise due to their lack of series, with each entry featuring a completely different playstyle. The game was first released in Japan by Sunsoft as Hebereke for the Family Computer on September 20, 1991, with plans for an international release underway. It was previewed in Electronic Gaming Monthly and Nintendo Power, showcased in playable state to attendees at the 1991 WCES in North America, reviewed by GamePro and VideoGames & Computer Entertainment, and planned for a fall 1991 launch. However, plans for a North American localization were cancelled. David Siller, Sunsoft of America's former vice president of development, claimed that the company's managers felt the game's characters were too "strange or quirky" compared to cartoons by The Walt Disney Company and Warner Brothers, with Gimmick! also suffering the same fate. However, Siller stated that both titles most likely could have been commercial successes.

Screenshot of Hebereke prior to localization, showing Hebe and birds dropping feces instead of weights

Ufouria was released in Europe on November 19, 1992. This iteration had some alterations when compared with the original Japanese release such as a different story, characters' names and sprites being changed, and bird enemies dropping weights instead of feces. As the European cartridge is encoded for PAL regions, the game exhibits faster music when played on a North American (NTSC) Nintendo Entertainment System. Because of a limited release, this version is harder to find and more expensive than earlier European NES titles, becoming a rare collector's item that commands high prices on the secondary game collecting market. It was also released in Australia in 1992. On June 25, 1994, its soundtrack was included with the soundtracks of three other titles in the Hebereke series and Gimmick!, all in one album titled Takusan Hebereke, published by Datam Polystar and distributed by PolyGram in Japan. The original Japanese version received an English fan translation in 2013. The game's soundtrack was also included with the soundtracks of two Hebereke titles and Gimmick! in the album Sunsoft Music Collection Vol.3, published by Wave Master also in Japan on November 30, 2011. An NTSC prototype ROM has since been leaked online, which has several differences compared with the final version.

Ufouria was first re-released alongside Journey to Silius for the PlayStation in Japan on March 28, 2002, as a part of Memorial Series Sunsoft Vol.5, which was later made available on the PlayStation Network in Japan on November 24, 2010. In 2003, Sunsoft collaborated with developer Space Out to produce a version of Hebereke for mobile phones, which was released in Japan on August 18. The game was also re-released in digital form for Microsoft Windows through D4 Enterprise's Project EGG service on April 20, 2010. That same year, Ufouria was rated by the Australian OFLC, implying a future international re-rerelease. The game was re-released several times through the Virtual Console; the first time was on the Wii in Europe on July 2, 2010, then in North America on August 23, and later in Japan on March 29, 2011. The second time was on the Nintendo 3DS in Japan on July 24, 2013. The third time was on the Wii U in North America on July 24, 2014, then in Europe on October 9, and later in Japan on January 28, 2015. In August 2022, it was announced that a Sunsoft-developed re-release of the game was scheduled to release for Microsoft Windows, Nintendo Switch, PlayStation 4, and Xbox One in 2023. The game would release as Hebereke: Enjoy Edition on March 28, 2024, for Steam and Nintendo Switch, without any update on the PS4 or Xbox versions.

== Reception ==
Reception

Review scores
Publication	Score
Famitsu	5/10, 7/10, 7/10, 7/10
GamePro	18/25
HobbyConsolas	69/100
Micromanía	35/60
Superjuegos	79/100
Video Games (DE)	68%
VideoGames & Computer Entertainment	6/10
Hippon Super!	6/10
Nintendo Lehti	3.5/5.0

Ufouria: The Saga on the Nintendo Entertainment System received mixed reception from critics since its release. Famitsu's four reviewers proclaimed that Ufouria's characters were cute but strange due to their unique animations. They also commended the game's controls for being responsive. GamePro's Slasher Quan stated that Ufouria is "a mildly amusing foray into a world straight from Mario Land, but that just means it's a kick to play." Quan noted that the game was reminiscent of Super Mario Bros. 2 due to each character having their own abilities. He also gave positive remarks to its graphics, sound, gameplay, fun factor and challenge. VideoGames & Computer Entertainment's Chris Bieniek claimed that Ufouria had better sound effects and music than most 16-bit releases. Bieniek noted its character-switching mechanic, and stated that the "cute" visuals were colorful and animated but simple in structure. Hobby Consolas' José Luis Sanz concurred with Quan in regards to the title being similar to Super Mario Bros. 2 gameplay-wise. Luis Sanz commended its sound and controls but criticized the graphics for being simplistic and monotonous, as well as the low number of enemy sprites on-screen. Sanz ultimately regarded Ufouria as a simple arcade-style platformer for younger players.

Superjuegos' Antonio Greppi called Ufouria to be a "worthy successor to the Super Mario saga, but with fewer arcade characteristics." Greppi praised its colorful graphics, difficulty and originality, but criticized the music for being repetitive. Micromanía's J.G.V. felt mixed about the game's originality, lack of variety in the action, simple visuals, animations and low difficulty, but aspects such as the sound and use of passwords were commended. Finnish magazine Nintendo Lehti gave positive remarks to its audiovisual presentation, gameplay and overall challenge. Video Games' Jan Barysch felt that Ufouria was a solid platform game "with a good dose of wit." Barysch commended the game's exploration component for being motivating and fun, though he remarked that more experienced players will feel underchallenged for not being difficult. However, he felt very mixed regarding its audiovisual aspect.

=== Retrospective coverage ===
Retrospective commentary for Ufouria: The Saga have been more positive since its re-release on the Virtual Console and has since gained a cult following. Nintendo Life's Marcel van Duyn and Jake Shapiro praised its surrealist tone, cartoon artstyle in vein of shows such as Rocko's Modern Life and Courage the Cowardly Dog, Naoki Kodaka's soundtrack, controls and the ability to switch between characters for bringing an element of strategy, with van Duyn claiming that "Ufouria is a great example of a third-party developer beating Nintendo at their own game. It does just about everything the original Metroid did, but better". However, Duyn found the game and its bosses to be easy, while Shapiro felt that the level designs and mechanics were generic. IGN's Lucas M. Thomas regarded Ufouria as an "intriguing" mixture of several NES titles such as Blaster Master, Castlevania II: Simon's Quest and Castlevania III: Dracula's Curse due to its interconnected world and character-swapping mechanic. Thomas also noted its odd atmosphere, short length and low challenge but criticized the lack of an on-screen map and checkpoints.

Spanish magazine RetroManiac found Ufouria: The Saga to be much easier to complete than Metroid, due to the inclusion of a map and compass. They found its audiovisual presentation to be remarkable and regarded it as one of the best action-adventure titles on the NES catalog. Destructoid's Jonathan Holmes commended Ufouria for its combination of "Super Mario Bros.-style action with Metroid-style power-up collection and exploration", as well as the characters' designs and animations, but criticized the low difficulty, short length and soundtrack in the Virtual Console reissue for being the faster PAL version. Nintendo World Report's Neal Ronaghan praised the music, Metroid-style gameplay and character animations, but criticized Ufouria for being occasionally unintuitive and obtuse, as well as its dated design. USgamer's Jeremy Parish called Ufouria one of the best NES games available on the Wii U's Virtual Console.

== Sequel ==
In October 2023, Ufouria: The Saga 2 was announced for release in early 2024. The next month, it was announced that the game would release for Microsoft Windows and Nintendo Switch on February 29, 2024. In January 2024, it was announced that the game would release for all current generation platforms on March 1, 2024.
