= Astra Superstars =

1998 video game

- Japanese arcade flyer of Astra Superstars
- Developer: Sunsoft
- Publishers: Tecmo; Sunsoft (Saturn)
- Directors: Kiharu Yoshida; Mitsuharu Kitajima
- Producer: Akito Takeuchi
- Designers: Michio Okasaka; Mayson Dassy
- Programmer: Michio Okasaka
- Artists: Michio Okasaka; Mayson Dassy; Shigeyuki Asa; Maki Saitō; Ayako Mochizuki
- Composers: Kazuo Nii; Atsushi Takada; Satoshi Asano
- Platforms: Arcade, Sega Saturn
- Release: 1998
- Genre: Fighting
- Modes: Single-player, multiplayer
- Arcade system: Sega Titan Video hardware (ST-V)

Astra Superstars (アストラスーパースターズ) is a 1998 arcade fighting game developed by Sunsoft and published by Tecmo. It was released only in Japan. It is Sunsoft's fourth fighting game after the 1994 Super Famicom Hebereke franchise spin-off Sugoi Hebereke, the 1995 Galaxy Fight: Universal Warriors and the 1996 Waku Waku 7. It is powered by the Sega Saturn-based ST-V (Sega Titan Video) arcade system. Astra Superstars is an airborne-based fighting game.

== Gameplay ==
A match between Cupe (left) and Maron (right)

The object of the airborne-based fighting game is to knock out the opponent in two out of three rounds (except the one round-only final boss fight). There are two modes in the original arcade version: "Story Mode" (1P-only) or "1P VS. 2P". In "Story Mode", at the beginning of each battle, the player must converse with the opponent by selecting one of three sentences. Depending on which sentence is selected, the CPU-controlled opponent will either "Heat Up" (become hard), "Cool Down" (become easy) or stay neutral before fighting (no difficulty change).

Depending on what is said, the player can encounter the Devil (based on bad judgment of character) or the Angel (based on good judgement of character) to fight before the final boss. The Angel requires the player to judge their opponent well and not have any hiccups. The Devil will show up should just one choice be wrong.

Players control with an 8-way joystick and six buttons, similar to one of the two arcade cabinet versions of the 1987 Street Fighter and its sequel Street Fighter II, but the six basic moves work differently compared to typical six-button layouts. The two heavy attack buttons usually send the opponent flying across the stage, but the opponent can bounce off the side of the screen. Depending on how aggressively the combos are performed, sometimes the opponent bounces back and forth around the screen like in pinball (as indicated by the game). The player's character can move briefly below or above the screen, which can be used for dodging attacks or chasing opponents above or below the screen. The energy bars below the screen are "Star Rank" bars, which are used for filling enough energy to perform one of two desperation moves per playable character called "Star Specials".

Unlike most fighting games, Astra Superstars features the small basic moves and the large Star Special moves, but no medium-sized special moves. The player can summon a shield around the character. If the player constantly attacks an opponent that is guarding, the guard breaks, making the opponent briefly unable to move. When next to the opponent, the player can "turn behind" the opponent. If the player KOs the opponent the second time either with one of two heavy button basic moves or with a Star Special, the opponent will exit the screen. If the player aggressively attacks and KOs the dizzied opponent, it becomes a "Doctor Down" KO. Like in Data East's 1984 Karate Champ arcade, when the time is up, the judge will determine who fought the best. Depending on how the player or opponent wins a round, the winner will have a certain letter placed below his or her lifebar. The "V" means the winner KO'd the opponent with a basic move, the "S" means the winner KO'd the opponent with a Star Special, the "D" means the winner aggressively KO'd the dizzied opponent, and "J" means the winner was chosen by the judge.

== Characters ==
There are twelve characters in this game, eight of which are playable, while the last four are non-playable bosses.

=== Playable ===
- Lettuce - a gallant and lighthearted wanderer distinguishable by both his unusual curly hairdo and floating white cape. He is the principal character of Astra Superstars.
- Maron - a happy but naïve teenage angel student who aims to become the highest-ranking angel.
- Stella - a 1024-year-old witch wielding her magical wand with a sentient white glove attached to it. She is the oldest playable character in the game according to her character bio.
- Sakamoto - an arrogant Japanese fighter who uses his hands for blades and can shapeshift into an enormous oni that covers up several times the screen.
- Rouge - a young girl wearing a Santa Claus outfit. She fights using her personal bag that can shoot out comically large toys or be used as her mode of transportation. Rouge is friends with Coco, comes from the North Pole, and is the smallest and youngest of the playable characters.
- Coco - a young, soft-hearted, and flamboyant sorcerer that is the crown prince of Onion Country.
- Cupe - an enormous, bald-headed giant that is the tallest and strongest of the playable characters.
- Fooly - a cunning, heartless, Devil-like leader of a group of gangsters.

=== Non-playable ===
- Satanvolte - the first boss of the Story Mode. Big and powerful, he can attack the player for huge damage.
- Test-kun - the second and final boss of the Story Mode. Test-kun is a simple, blue stick figure that was previously used as a template for the fighters.
- My Angel/Devil - two small beings that represent both the angel and the devil inside themselves. A sub-boss in the game's Story Mode, each of the two can shapeshift to a clone of the fighter that the player chooses, no matter the difficulty they choose.

== Development and release ==
In a reversal of the usual pattern for arcade games, Astra Superstars was developed first for home console (specifically, the Sega Saturn) and then ported to arcade hardware. Though the development cycles of the two versions overlapped, at the beginning of 1998 the Saturn version was virtually finished while the arcade version was just 65% complete, with Sunsoft planning to use the additional development time to add arcade-exclusive features. While the Saturn version features the same "Story Mode" and 1P VS. 2P modes as the arcade version, it also features six exclusive modes: "1P VS. COM", "COM VS. COM", "Character Profile", "Option Mode", "Illust Gallery" and "Exit". "Exit" returns to Attract Mode. This version's soundtrack is an updated version of the arcade version's soundtrack. This version uses the Saturn's 1 MB RAM expansion cartridge.

Santaclaus, the illustrator of the Astra Superstars art and design, developed and released a novelty freeware software on their website Astra Inn for Mac and Windows PCs dedicated to Astra Superstars fans titled Rouge Kitz Room (るーじゅ・きっつ・るーむ), which allows users to dress Rouge in different clothes, who is one of the characters from the game as well as Santaclaus' mascot. They also developed and uploaded an online casino-style online card game Fools Karte (フルスカルテ) on December 12, 2001, for members of Astra Inn only. Fooly from Astra Superstars was added to this game as its protagonist. Rouge, Maron, and Stella, also from Astra Superstars were also added to the game with three exclusive characters: Ravi, Prato and Trasche.

=== Soundtrack ===
Astra Superstars - Original Sound Trax

Soundtrack album by Kazuo Nii Atsushi Takada Satoshi Asano
- Released: February 18, 1998
- Recorded: Unknown
- Genre: Video game soundtrack
- Length: 76:46
- Labels: Pony Canyon; Scitron Label

A soundtrack album of the Sega ST-V arcade system version was released by Pony Canyon and Scitron Label on February 18, 1998, exclusively in Japan under the catalog number PCCB-00298. It contains nearly every background music, as well as sound effects and voice samples from the arcade version. It also includes "Angel Star -Soundtrack Version-", an exclusive version of Maron's theme "Angel Star". It was composed and arranged by Kazuo Nii, Atsushi Takada and Satoshi Asano.

== See also ==
- Waku Waku 7
- Galaxy Fight
- Psychic Force - a 1995 3D fighter that also has airbone-based gameplay.
