= Batman: The Video Game (Game Boy video game) =

1990 video game

- North American box art
- Developer: Sunsoft
- Publisher: Sunsoft
- Director: Cho Musou
- Designers: Kazutomo Mori; Kenichi Abe; Masashige Furihata; Rieko Sakai; Tadashi Kojima
- Programmer: Akihiro Asada
- Composers: Naoki Kodaka; Nobuyuki Hara; Shinichi Seya
- Series: Batman
- Platform: Game Boy
- Release: JP: April 13, 1990; NA: June 1990; EU: 1990
- Genre: Action
- Mode: Single-player

Batman: The Video Game is a 1990 action video game developed and published by Sunsoft for the Game Boy. Based on the DC Comics superhero Batman, it is inspired by the Warner Bros.'s 1989 film of the same name. In the main storyline, Batman must face the Joker. The Game Boy version was developed by most of the same staff at Sunsoft which had previously worked on the Nintendo Entertainment System adaptation based on the 1989 film. It was produced by Cho Musou, while soundtrack was composed by Naoki Kodaka, Nobuyuki Hara, and Shinichi Seya. The game garnered a generally favorable reception from critics and retrospective commentators.

== Gameplay ==
Gameplay screenshot

Batman: The Video Game on the Game Boy is an action game.

== Development and release ==
Batman: The Video Game on the Game Boy was developed by most of the same staff at Sunsoft which had previously worked on the Nintendo Entertainment System adaptation based on Warner Bros.'s 1989 film of the same name. The Game Boy version was directed by Cho Musou, with Akihiro "Lucky" Asada, Yuichi "Zap.Yuichi" Ueda, and a staff member only known by the pseudonym of "Aka" acting as co-programmers under direction of Hiroaki "Hiro-Kun" Higashiya. Kazutomo "Kaz" Mori, Kenichi "Abe Kun" Abe, Masashige "M.F" Furihata, Rieko "Rie" Sakai, Tadashi Kojima, and a staffer under the pseudonym "Aki" served as co-designers. The soundtrack was composed by Naoki Kodaka, Nobuyuki Hara, and Shinichi "About.SS" Seya. Batman was first released in Japan on April 13, 1990, then in North America on June, and later in Europe that same year.

== Reception ==
Reception

Review scores
Publication	Score
ACE	89/100
Aktueller Software Markt	10/12
Electronic Gaming Monthly	8/10, 8/10, 8/10, 7/10
Famitsu	3/10, 8/10, 7/10, 5/10
Player One	94%
The Games Machine (UK)	90%
Total!	80%
Video Games (DE)	80%
Zero	89%
Mean Machines	85%
Megablast	80%
Power Play	80%

Batman: The Video Game on the Game Boy garnered a generally favorable reception from critics. ACE's Eugene Lacey found the game addictive, citing the variety of levels and Super Mario Land-style gameplay, but noted its difficulty. Power Play's Volker Weitz thought the game was a fun combination of Super Mario Bros.-esque platforming and shooting, and praised its graphics and upbeat audio. Aktueller Software Markt's Hans-Joachim Amann felt the game's overall audiovisual department was very good for Game Boy standards, and commended the game's simple but precise controls.

Electronic Gaming Monthly's four reviewers gave the game positive remarks for its visuals, challenging gameplay, soundtrack, and intermission cutscenes. Player One's Cyril Drevet regarded it as one of the best Game Boy titles, lauding its music, gameplay, graphics, and mixture of platforming and shooter stages. The Games Machine's Richard Eddy labelled it as an enjoyable and addictive game, praising the combination of platform and shoot 'em up genres as its strongest feature. A writer for Zero celebrated the game's addictive gameplay and audiovisual presentation.

Mean Machines' Matt Regan and Julian Rignall found it reminiscent of Super Mario Land but nevertheless recommended the game for its addictive playability, distinctive stages, and variety of weapons. Video Games' Michael Hengst highlighted the game's music, controls, well-designed stages, and enemy patterns, but felt that it was graphically not on par with titles like Gargoyle's Quest. Total!'s Andy Dyer gave the game favorable remarks for its graphical presentation, soundscapes, and smooth controls, but criticized its high difficulty and long stages. Megablast's Max Magenauer wrote that "the tricky but very fair level design and the optimal two-button controls make the game still a pleasure today". By December 1990, the game sold over 500,000 copies.

Retrospective commentary for Batman on the Game Boy has been mostly favorable. AllGame's Jonathan Sutyak felt the game did not make effective use of the Batman license, stating that having Batman using a gun was not a good idea. Nintendo Life's Dave Frear found the game fun to play, commending its detailed cutscenes, music, responsive controls, and inclusion of the Batwing segments. Jeuxvideo.com's Leobiwan gave the game positive remarks for its graphics, simple gameplay, and audio, but faulted its short lifespan and overall scenario. Hardcore Gaming 101's Chris Rasa said that "for an early Game Boy platformer, it's pretty fun. While the sprites are amusingly tiny, the action is pretty fast and smooth compared to contemporaries like The Castlevania Adventure".
