= Lost Patrol (video game) =

1990 video game

- Cover art by Bob Wakelin
- Developers: Shadow Development; Astros Productions (MS-DOS)
- Publisher: Ocean Software
- Designers: Ian Harling; Simon Cooke
- Programmers: Simon Cooke; Nick Byron
- Artist: Ian Harling
- Composers: Chris Glaister; Jonathan Dunn
- Platforms: Amiga, Atari ST, MS-DOS
- Release: 1990: Amiga, Atari ST; 1991: MS-DOS
- Genre: Action role-playing
- Mode: Single-player

Lost Patrol, also known as The Lost Patrol, is a survival action role-playing strategy video game developed by Shadow Development and published by Ocean Software for the Amiga and Atari ST computers in 1990. An MS-DOS port by Astros Productions was published in 1991. Set during the Vietnam War, the game follows a squad of United States Army soldiers who are stranded behind enemy lines after their helicopter crashes, and must reach a U.S. military outpost for rescue.

== Gameplay ==
Lost Patrol is a survival strategy game in which the player must lead a squad of seven soldiers to safety after they are left stranded deep in enemy territory with little food and ammunition. The player assumes control of squad leader Sergeant Charlie Weaver as he attempts to organize the squad and lead them to safety.

The main gameplay interface is a map of the area, with the days since the crash and the in-game time displayed at the top of the screen, and the menu bar and in-game information displayed at the bottom. Most actions are performed in the menu bar's drop-down list (various icons in the MS-DOS version): the squad can search the area for food or supplies, briefly rest for several minutes, or dig in and rest for several hours; consume regular field rations, half of a ration serving, or emergency rations; or lay a Claymore mine or grenade booby trap. Game functions can also be accessed in the menu bar, as can bonus extras such as the game's assets and credits. To move, the player must choose from the eight cardinal and ordinal directions on a compass rose; the player can also select how cautious the squad is while moving. The terrain the squad is traveling through, which can be viewed in detail in the map's grid view, affects how fast the squad moves, with more treacherous terrain such as mountains slowing them down more than less-treacherous terrain such as paddy fields.

Information on the squad members can be accessed in the squad menu. Through the squad menu, players can set the squad leader and designated scout. The squad menu also displays each member's strength, morale, and any injuries they have (can be inflicted through gameplay, though squad members can sometimes already be injured at the start of the game from the crash), as well as each member's individual characteristics, which affect how they react to certain decisions and events. Some soldiers have exceptional skills for certain situations as mentioned in the game's manual, such as Private Richard Backman being an expert marksman. Missing or killed squad members are permanently lost for the rest of the playthrough.

The game features five types of action sequences, in which the player controls a squad member in a combat situation against the Viet Cong. In all of them, the player can attempt to retreat, but this is risky. The five action sequences each take the form of a different video game genre, and are as follows:

- Battle: The squad is attacked by a Viet Cong patrol, and the squad must return fire to defend their position, in a common shooting gallery section. The player must defeat all of the enemies as they pop up, while also taking cover to avoid being shot. The player can switch their rate of fire between normal and heavy, which affects how fast they fire but also their shooting accuracy and ammunition usage.
- Sniper: One or more enemy snipers pin the squad down from a row of huts, and one squad member must serve as a counter-sniper to defeat the snipers before they can kill them and the rest of the squad, in a manner also similar to a shooting gallery. To locate the snipers, the player must scan the horizon with a scope for occasional muzzle flashes.
- Grenade: The squad encounters Viet Cong machine gun nests that pin them down with suppressive fire. As direct fire is too dangerous, one squad member must throw grenades at the machine gun nests, in what is essentially a first-person artillery game. To throw a grenade, the player must charge strength that determines how far the grenade will go before landing and exploding. Like the Sniper sequence, the nests are only marked by muzzle flashes, and they must be hit by a grenade explosion to be defeated.
- Minefield: The squad comes across an enemy minefield, and one squad member is sent to secure a safe path through. The squad member must crawl through the minefield and carefully find a safe way through before time runs out, with gameplay somewhat similar to a puzzle game. The player can stab the ground to reveal the outline of a mine if one is there; however, directly stabbing the detonator or going over a mine will cause the mine to detonate.
- Hand-to-Hand: A scout can occasionally encounter a Viet Cong guerilla, and must defeat them in hand-to-hand combat; here, gameplay is similar to a fighting game, and the player can choose between keyboard or joystick controls to play. The scout must defeat the guerilla before time runs out, or they will be presumed missing in action and lost.

Occasionally, the squad can come across Vietnamese or Montagnard civilians, as well as villages populated by them. Players can communicate with these civilians by typing keywords, while actions can be selected through a drop-down list. A variety of potential courses of action can be taken during civilian encounters or when in villages; the squad can search the area, attempt to communicate with civilians to gather intelligence or supplies, take one captive for interrogation, or kill one or even all of the villagers to force compliance or loot their belongings. A major risk factor in these interactions is that some civilians may be secretly working with the Viet Cong and attempt to kill the squad members or distract them for Viet Cong forces to arrive, while others may simply be innocent but find the English-speaking soldiers untrustworthy or difficult to understand. For example, one civilian encounter involves an elderly woman approaching the squad carrying an unidentified package without stopping; the package can turn out to be either a bomb or merely bánh chưng, which may or may not be poisoned. The squad can approach her with their guard down, hold her at gunpoint and attempt to maintain control over the situation, or simply shoot her and search the package themselves.

== Plot ==
On June 7, 1966 (June 1965 in in-game text), a squad of U.S. Army soldiers is returning from an R&R break in Saigon when their Bell UH-1 Iroquois crashes in South Vietnam's Central Highlands, which has a major Viet Cong presence. Only seven soldiers—Sergeant Charlie Weaver and Privates William Blom, Robert Case, Harvey Moore, Richard Backman, David Cain, and Juan Gomez—survive the crash, but are left with little food and ammunition; their radio is also lost in the crash, leaving them without a way to communicate with the rest of the U.S. military for rescue. The squad is forced to trek through enemy-occupied wilderness to reach safety at the nearest American outpost, Du Hoc, roughly 58 miles away.

== Development ==
Development took over a year, but the main stumbling block was Ocean themselves. The problem was that they were bringing out games like Batman that were strongly arcade titles and trying to get us to mould Lost Patrol to that kind of arcade structure. We on the other hand wanted a deep, realistic game that echoed some aspects of early text-based adventures and required that you interact constantly with your team and those you met. It was always a struggle and we came in months late on completion because of trying to resolve the way we saw the game and the way that Ocean did. A day in my life at the time was split between going to the library, watching war films and buying research books and doing the actual drawing. Each screen took about 3 days to complete, 12-14 hours a day, a pixel at a time.

— Ian Harling

Lost Patrol began as an idea to make a game in the style of Cinemaware's interactive film titles but with more gameplay, and the designer and artist Ian Harling even sent a game concept to Cinemaware and six other companies but was rejected, until Ocean Software's Gary Bracey accepted it in early 1989 when they decided to move on to the 16-bit market. Lost Patrol was originally intended by Ocean as a follow-up to 1987's Platoon and was thus initially subtitled Platoon II.

Upon reading more about the atrocities of the Vietnam War, Harling decided to incorporate moral dilemmas into the plot. Several segments were changed or abandoned altogether due to technical limitations and other reasons, such as the tunnel sequence which was cut altogether. Harling created the graphics using Deluxe Paint II, scanned hand-drawn images with photographic references, and digitized Vietnam footage stills for the Amiga as the prime platforms. His original 32-color graphics were then downgraded for the Atari ST.

The game was programmed by Simon Cooke, with whom Harling had previously worked on an unreleased game, Xenodrome. Nick Byron aided them with ideas and additional coding and also created the hand-to-hand sequence. There was a widely pirated, leaked Amiga version of the game that was incomplete, buggy, extremely hard and prone to crashes. Lost Patrol was also later ported to MS-DOS by Astros Productions. The main theme playing throughout the Amiga version was composed by Chris Glaister.

== Reception ==
Reception

Review scores
Publication	Score
Zero	89% (Amiga); 88% (ST)
The Games Machine	85% (Amiga)
CU Amiga	83% (Amiga)
Amiga Format	79% (Amiga)
The One	73% (Amiga)

Lost Patrol sold very well and was in the UK's Amiga's top ten chart in late 1990. The game received mostly positive reviews upon its release, including the scores of 85% from The Games Machine, 73% from The One, 79% from Amiga Format, and 83% from CU Amiga. Zero gave the Amiga version of Lost Patrol an overall score of 89%, while the ST version got 88%.

Computer Gaming World's 1992 and 1994 surveys of wargames with modern settings gave the game zero stars out of five, criticizing the joystick controls as "so poorly done that the entire game is totally unplayable".

According to Roberto Dillon's 2011 book The Golden Age of Video Games, it was "a unique game among military and combat simulations" that "offered a different perspective on war from any other game released before or since ... showing there is no glory in war but only pain and destruction".
