= Waku Waku 7 =

1996 video game

- Developer: Sunsoft
- Publishers: JP: Sunsoft; NA: SNK
- Director: Yuichi Ueda
- Designers: Atsuki Matsui; Kazuhito Terada; Koki Kita
- Programmer: Shigetaka Inaba
- Composer: Masato Araikawa
- Platform: Arcade: Neo Geo AES, Sega Saturn
- Release: November 21, 1996: Arcade; WW: November 21, 1996 Neo Geo AES; JP: December 27, 1996 Saturn; JP: June 20, 1997
- Genre: Fighting
- Modes: Single-player, multiplayer
- Arcade system: Neo Geo MVS

Waku Waku 7 (Note: Japanese: わくわく7, Hepburn: Waku Waku Sebun; "Exciting 7") is a 1996 fighting game developed and published by Sunsoft for the Neo Geo arcade platform. It was later ported to the Sega Saturn.

Hamster Corporation re-released the game as part of their ACA Neo Geo series for the PlayStation 4, Xbox One, Nintendo Switch and Windows.

== Gameplay ==
Gameplay screenshot showcasing a match between Arina and Tesse.

Waku Waku 7 has an irregular feature set for a fighting game of its time, and includes features common to SNK fighting games (such as four basic attacks and screens zooming).

The game has a roster of nine characters (two of which were available only in the Versus mode of the console ports). Each has a significantly different playstyle and parodies a well-known character from another game. Each character has a powerful special move (referred to as the Harahara movement, or Harahara motion). They have several factors that make them unique, including a need to be charged (during which the character concentrates, says something, strikes a pose or blows a fanfare) and being unblockable and difficult to dodge, but can be interrupted while charging; while charging, the game flashes a warning and sounds an alarm. Characters can be launched through the screen to hit the other corner, and attacked while on the ground, but can also dodge or attack while getting up.

== Characters ==
- Rai Bakuoh is a cocky 13-year-old boy who pursues the WakuWaku Balls to achieve his dream of more exciting adventures. He practices BMX tricks and has an excellent jumping ability (including a double-jump). He is a parody of Sie Kensou from The King of Fighters/Psycho Soldier, and most of his special moves are similar to that of Roddy from Top Hunter and it manifests some sort of dark electric power.
- Arina Makihara is a 14-year-old girl with bunny ears, clad in a unitard and short-sleeved jacket. She pursues the WakuWaku Balls to achieve her dream to have a nice love. She is said to have learned to fight in an extracurricular compulsory class in high school, and is often seen with her friends and little brother, who are, like her, all parodies of typical half-animal/half-human characters from several shōjo manga and anime.
- Dandy-J is a treasure hunter hired to go after the WakuWaku Balls, though has no wish to grant in particular, and is accompanied by his friend's daughter Natsumi Hazama and pet cat "Rampoo" (sometimes mentioned as Ramp or Rump) in his quest. Dandy-J uses a whip in his battles, with Natsumi and Rump sometimes making single attacks at the opponent. He is a parody of both the titular character of the Indiana Jones series and Joseph Joestar from JoJo's Bizarre Adventure.
- Mauru (known as Marurun in the Japanese version) is a purple forest creature that is a parody of Totoro. He carries a lost little girl named Mugi Rokujoh. He likes fruits and singing. Mauru's play style is similar to the Darkstalkers character Sasquatch, with many moves mimicking near-verbatim.
- Politank-Z is a tank-mecha of the police department, which is a parody of the police tanks from Dominion. It is piloted by the Chief and his trusty sidekick, the Mechanic, who is a dog. The Politank is large and slow, making it easy to hit, but is able to deal large amounts of damage.
- Slash is a calm and collected elf with light green hair and a blue trench coat who battles with a laser sword. He has no wish to grant in particular when he obtains the WakuWaku Balls. Though in his ending he says that it is his own destiny to remove a curse from his sword. He is a parody of typical sword-using heroes of certain manga and anime.
- Tesse is the seventh robot built by Dr. Lombrozo, Tesse was made to be that of a maid (cooking and keeping the house clean). She pursues the WakuWaku Balls to not only cure the illness of Dr. Lombrozo, but to also achieve her dream of becoming human. She fights using an assorted array of cleaning utensils, electricity attacks, and a syringe. She is possibly a cross parody of Astro Boy and cosplay restaurants.

Selectable only in the versus mode:

- Bonus-kun is a living punching bag whose looks, motives and attacks directly lampoon Ryu from Capcom's Street Fighter franchise. His origins lie in Galaxy Fight: Universal Warriors; he was Rouwe's punching bag, until it became alive and was then trained by him. Due to a lack of limbs, he cannot crouch or grab opponents. In Waku Waku 7, he features more moves than he did in Galaxy Fight: Universal Warriors.
- Fernandez (known as Fernandeath in the Japanese version) is an emperor of the demon world, a black sphere with stubby arms, legs and wings, a large grin and an irritating modulated voice. Fernandez is the game's final boss, and is as tall as a skyscraper. Through a variety of magical means, the other characters are enlarged so as to fight him on equal terms, which is a reference to the kaiju genre.

== Development ==
It was Sunsoft's third fighting game after their 1994 Super Famicom spin-off of their Hebereke series, Sugoi Hebereke, and their 1995 Galaxy Fight: Universal Warriors, their first 2D fighting game. Although numbers in titles of games and other types of media are used to tell if they are sequels, the title of the game actually refers to its seven playable characters in the roster. The word "Waku Waku" is a Japanese onomatopoeia for sounds of excitement. Two years later, Sunsoft worked with a small company SANTACLAUS in producing the 1998 airborne-based fighting game Astra Superstars for the Sega ST-V arcade system.

== Home releases ==
Waku Waku 7 was later ported to the Neo Geo AES home console, which features easy-to-access difficulty settings and limited credits.

A Neo Geo CD version was in development, but was canceled due to the Neo-Geo CD failing in the market. This version was later ported to the Sega Saturn instead, but exclusively in Japan. It requires the Saturn's 1 MB RAM expansion cartridge.

In 2008, the original Neo Geo version was included with the Neo Geo CD version of Sunsoft's other fighting game Galaxy Fight: Universal Warriors in Vol.11 of the Neo Geo Online Collection series for the PlayStation 2, titled Sunsoft Collection (サンソフトコレクション). While the Neo Geo CD soundtrack for Galaxy Fight: Universal Warriors was added in this version, the soundtrack for Waku Waku 7 is completely different from the unreleased Neo Geo CD version that was later ported to the Sega Saturn. SNK was unable to add the Neo Geo CD / Sega Saturn version of the soundtrack because of licensing issues.

The Neo Geo AES home console version was ported to the Wii Virtual Console in Japan on April 27, 2010.

== Soundtrack ==
Waku Waku 7

Soundtrack album by Masato Araikawa
- Released: August 21, 1996
- Recorded: Unknown
- Genre: Video game soundtrack
- Length: 55:04
- Labels: Pony Canyon; Scitron Label

A soundtrack album of the Neo-Geo version was released by Pony Canyon and Scitron Label on August 21, 1996 exclusively in Japan under the catalog number PCCB-00215. It contains nearly every background music, as well as sound effects and voice samples from the arcade version. It was composed and arranged by Masato Araikawa.

== Reception ==
Reception

Aggregate score
Aggregator	Score
GameRankings	(NS) 76.25%

Review scores
Publication	Score
AllGame	(NG) 4.5/5
Famitsu	(SS) 63/100
Joypad	(SS) 48%
Nintendo Life	(NS) 8/10
Nintendo World Report	(NS) 6.5/10
Bonus Stage	(NS) 6/10
Cubed3	(NS) 8/10
Digitally Downloaded	(NS) 4/5
Neo Geo Freak	(AC) 14/20
Sega Saturn Magazine (JP)	(SS) 6.0/10

Waku Waku 7 was met with generally positive reception from critics since its initial release in arcades and other platforms. AllGame's Kyle Knight reviewed the AES version regarded the graphical presentation as among the best on Neo Geo, praising the audio design, unique fighting system and character roster but criticized its implementation of the power gauge mechanic. The Sega Saturn conversion was met with a more mixed response from reviewers for being a straightforward conversion of the original arcade game. However, fan reception was positive; Readers of the Japanese Sega Saturn Magazine voted to give the Saturn port a 7.4692 out of 10 score, ranking at the number 527 spot below Galaxy Fight: Universal Warriors, indicating a popular following.

The Nintendo Switch re-release garnered mostly positive response from retrospective reviewers. The Switch version holds a 76.25% on the video game review aggregator GameRankings. Nintendo Life's Damien McFerran commended the cartoon-style audiovisual presentation, frantic pacing and varied character roster. Nintendo World Report's Zachary Miller noted its diverse and bizarre character roster but criticized the initial Switch release for the "washed" color palette.

In 2012, Complex's Elton Jones ranked this "underrated and virtually unknown fighter" as the 12th best SNK fighting game ever made, commenting: "Waku Waku 7 was a trip. Most of the cast was full of colorful beasts and parodies of popular fighting game characters. Mauru had to be the strangest looking creature on the roster (he was also one of the most fun guys to play with). We appreciate this game’s tight gameplay, super cheery graphics, and hilarious super moves. Do yourself a favor and import a copy of this joint". That same year, GamesRadar's Lucas Sullivan included "this cheery, colorful Neo Geo fighter" among the little-known classic fighting games that deserve HD remakes, adding: "Though the zany roster is only seven fighters strong (not including goofy secret characters like a sentient punching bag), Sunsoft crafted quite the fun brawler that gives you super meter and glitzy special moves as often as modern-day Marvel Vs. games".
