= Batman: The Video Game =

- North American box art
- Developer: Sunsoft
- Publisher: Sunsoft
- Designers: Kazutomo Mori; Masayuki Takatsuji; Noriko Sakai; Tadashi Kojima; Yoshiaki Iwata
- Programmers: Keiichi Suzuki; Hiroaki Higashiya; Yuichi Ueda
- Composers: Naoki Kodaka; Noboyuki Hara
- Series: Batman
- Platform: Nintendo Entertainment System
- Release: JP: December 22, 1989; NA: February 1990; EU: September 14, 1990
- Genre: Platform
- Mode: Single-player

Batman: The Video Game is a platformer developed by Sunsoft for the Nintendo Entertainment System featuring the DC Comics character Batman, tying into the 1989 film of the same name.

== Gameplay ==
Batman being attacked by Heat Wave in the first stage

Batman: The Video Game is a platformer that has five levels. The game has a feature that was unusual in side-scrolling platformers at the time, largely to the NES itself. Unlike Sunsoft's Batman for the Mega Drive/Genesis, that features the grappling hook, Batman has the ability to do a wall jump, which is reminiscent of wall scaling in Ninja Gaiden. He is able to use three projectile weapons: the batarang, batdisk, and batpoon, which are powered by pellet cartridges.

Though officially tied to the 1989 live-action adaptation, the plot bears very little resemblance to the story of the film. The stages consist of the Gotham City Streets, Axis Chemical Plant, Gotham Sewers, Mysterious Laboratory, and the Gotham Cathedral Belltower. A number of notable DC Universe villains appear as low-level minions, including Deadshot, KGBeast, Maxie Zeus, Heat Wave, Shakedown, and Nightslayer.

The bosses are Killer Moth, a device called the Machine Intelligence System, Electrocutioner, a machine known as the Dual-Container Alarm, Firebug, and the Joker. The penultimate boss will be skipped in the continued play if the player reached the Joker previously, so the Joker can be fought directly next time.

== Development ==
After games like Super Arabian (developed 1983) began Sunsoft's transition from arcade games to the home console market, the developer turned to IP, licensing Batman from Warner Brothers for US$1 million (¥150M). Negotiations for the game rights began before the movie was completed, and development staff were able to visit Tim Burton's set in London to better understand the look and feel of the film.

The prototype version had some significant differences, like a 1UP icon and entirely altered cutscenes. The final boss was originally Firebug, and the Joker was not present. Instead, Batman is shown defeating the Joker in the ending cutscene. The art and dialogue were changed from the prototype to the final version to better reflect the look and events from the film.

== Reception ==
Reception

Review scores
Publication	Score
ACE	890/1000
AllGame	4.5/5
Computer and Video Games	92%
Electronic Gaming Monthly	8/10, 8/10, 8/10, 7/10
Famitsu	6/10, 7/10, 7/10, 7/10
Joystick	90%
Official Nintendo Magazine	92%
Player One	95%
Raze	82%
Total!	81%
Video Games (DE)	63%
Mean Machines	87%
Play Time	74%
Super Gamer	91%

Award
Publication	Award
Electronic Gaming Monthly (1989)	Best Movie to Game

Batman: The Video Game garnered generally favorable reception from critics. Electronic Gaming Monthly's four reviewers praised the intermission cutscenes, challenging bosses, and different weapons. While the graphics received praise for matching the film's mood, they felt it detracted from the overall appeal and added that its gameplay could get repetitive. Computer and Video Games' Paul Rand lauded the presentation for its forbidding backgrounds, Batman's main sprite, and cutscenes. Rand also celebrated the soundscapes and frenetic gameplay. ACE's Euguene Lacey praised the atmospheric audiovisual presentation and gameplay, but commented that its overall appeal depends largely on being a Batman fan and noted its difficulty.

Joystick's Jean-Marc Demoly regarded the game as an excellent achievement on the NES, highlighting its dark graphics, sordid atmosphere, music, playability, and controls. Player One's Patrick Giordano applauded the visuals for their gothic look and animated sequences. Giordano also praised the soundtrack, audio effects, and controls, but noted the learning curve. Raze found the game to be very good, but considered the levels to be short. Mean Machines' Matt Regan and Julian Rignall praised the presentation for its animated cutscenes, crisp visuals, addictive gameplay, and balanced difficulty, but saw the audio as the only shortcoming. Video Games' Heinrich Lenhardt commended the thrilling music and said the dark graphics have a certain charm, but emphasized that it will take some getting used to and criticized the cumbersome way of switching weapons.

Play Time's Rainer Rosshirt found the game to be highly playable and gave positive remarks for its audiovisual department. Total!'s Andy Dyer expressed admiration for the atmospheric backgrounds and gameplay, but remarked that the soundscapes were not its best aspect. Nintendo Magazine System (Official Nintendo Magazine) rated it as a first-class title and considered its gameplay to be addictive, but mentioned the high level of difficulty. Super Gamer labelled it as one of the best platform games released on the NES, stating that the graphics captured the atmosphere and feel of Batman. AllGame's Brett Alan Weiss called it "one of the best superhero games for the NES". In a retrospective outlook, Hardcore Gaming 101's Chris Rasa highlighted its visuals, responsive controls, level design, and soundtrack, writing that "Sunsoft's first attempt at a Batman game remains its best".

=== Sales and accolades ===
According to Famitsu, Batman sold approximately 78,437 copies during its lifetime in Japan. In 1989, EGM gave it their "Best Movie to Game" award. In the years after its release, it has been celebrated as one of the best games on the NES. Furthermore, it is also listed among the best Batman games. In 2009, IGN placed the title on their "Top 100 NES Games" list at #33, citing its gameplay and high difficulty. In 2014, Digital Trends named it one of the fifty best games for the NES, although the publication noted storyline changes from the film on which it was based. In 2022, Destructoid identified it as one of the ten best games for the NES, opining that it was better designed than Ninja Gaiden, but highlighted its difficult nature. In 2023, Den of Geek listed it as one of the fifteen best NES games based on movies and TV shows.

== See also ==
- Batman (1989 video game) – Game by Ocean Software for home computers
- Batman: The Video Game (Game Boy video game)
- Batman (Genesis video game)
- Batman (PC Engine video game)
- Batman (1991 arcade game)
