= Albert Odyssey =

Albert Odyssey may refer to:

- Albert Odyssey (1993 video game), the Super Famicom game
  - Albert Odyssey 2: Jashin no Taidou, the sequel
- Albert Odyssey: Legend of Eldean, the Sega Saturn game
