= Platoon (1988 video game) =

Action video game

- Developers: Ocean Software (Commodore 64); Choice Software (ZX Spectrum/Amstrad CPC/Amiga/Atari ST); Sunsoft (NES); Quicksilver Software (Apple II)
- Publishers: Ocean Software; Erbe Software; Data East; Sunsoft (NES)
- Designer: Simon Butler
- Composers: Jonathan Dunn (C64); David Whittaker (Amiga/Amstrad/Spectrum)
- Platforms: Amiga, Amstrad CPC, Apple II, Atari ST, Commodore 64, MS-DOS, NES, ZX Spectrum
- Release: 25 January 1988
- Genre: Shoot 'em up
- Mode: Single-player

Platoon is an action game developed and published by Ocean Software for the Amiga, Amstrad CPC, Apple II, Atari ST, Commodore 64, MS-DOS, and ZX Spectrum in 1988. It was licensed by Data East and Erbe Software for release in North America and Spain, and by Sunsoft for the Nintendo Entertainment System.

== Development ==
Platoon was designed by Ocean's Simon Butler but only the Commodore 64 version was developed in-house. The Spectrum, Amstrad, Atari ST and Amiga versions were programmed by Choice Software in Northern Ireland. The NES version was ported by Sunsoft and published in September 1988. It was Ocean's first film licence to use the multi-stage design that would be prevalent on later titles, including Robocop (1988), Batman (1989) and The Untouchables (1989).

== Gameplay ==
Planting explosive charges on the bridge (Atari ST screenshot)

In Stage 1, the player is in a jungle with a side-scrolling element. The player is able to navigate vertically and horizontally through the screens. The player must also avoid getting hit by enemies, landing on explosive mines, as well as dodge any booby traps in the way. The goal of the first stage is to find the explosives buried deep within the jungle and then navigate out and plant the explosives on the bridge. After planting the explosives, the player will be in a town and must find a torch and a map of the tunnel system for the next level.

In Stage 2, the player is now in a tunnel system and the point of view has changed to a first-person shooter. The player is able to navigate through the tunnel system using the map obtained earlier in stage 1. The player must navigate through the tunnel system and collect flares and a compass along the way. Enemies will continuously appear on the screen and the player must kill them quickly in order to advance through the tunnel system.

In Stage 3, the player is stuck in a bunker overnight that is under constant siege by enemies. The player must use flares obtained in the tunnel system in order to see enemies outside the bunker to be able to shoot them. The player is still in first-person mode and must navigate the cross-hair onto the enemy players in order to shoot at them. A skilled player could make out the silhouettes of enemies amongst the background without the need for flares. As long as the player survives the siege, the level will be successfully completed by the player.

In Stage 4, the player is now navigating through the jungle in a third-person view. The player has 4 minutes to complete this level and must navigate through the jungle while killing enemies as well as avoiding sniper fire. The compass obtained in the tunnel system is used here to help the player navigate through the jungle. At the end of the jungle is the game's boss, Sergeant Barnes, who is holed up in a brick bunker and shooting at the player. The player must be able to land five grenade shots to defeat Sergeant Barnes.

== Release ==
Ocean released Platoon in the UK on 25 January 1988. The UK video of the film was also being released the same month so, in an industry first, the video featured a trailer for the game and the loading screen of the game advertised the video. The game also came with a poster and a recording of Smokey Robinson's "The Tracks of My Tears". Soon after release, the game was number one in the Gallup Top Twenty Computer Games Chart.

Toward the end of 1988, Ocean published Platoon as part of compilation of eight games titled The In Crowd. Marketed as "The Crucial Compilation", it also includes Barbarian: The Ultimate Warrior, Combat School, Target: Renegade and The Last Ninja (C64 only). The In Crowd reached number 5 in Gallup's All Format chart in early 1989.

Platoon returned to the Gallup All Formats chart in 1990 when it was re-released on Ocean's "Hit Squad" budget label.

== Reception ==
Reception

Awards
Publication	Award
Crash	Crash Smash
Computer & Video Games	"C+VG Hit"

Platoon received mixed reviews from critics, who praised its graphics and sound effects, but criticised its gameplay and difficulty.

Some of the reviewers highlighted the game's faithful adaptation of the movie, its realistic atmosphere, and its varied gameplay. For example, Zzap!64 gave the game a score of 94%, calling it "A superb combat simulation, and simply the best film tie-in to date - not to be missed." Similarly, The Games Machine awarded the game 92%, stating that "Really successful film tie-ins have been few and far between, Platoon is one of the few. A sure-fire winner from Ocean." Computer and Video Games awarded the Commodore 64 version a "C+VG Hit", commenting that Ocean had made a "competent job" with "what appeared to be one of the most difficult films to turn into a game"

Gary Penn for Commodore User said "I thoroughly enjoyed playing Platoon [...] this is without doubt one of the best film tie-ins to appear on the 64, which bodes well for Ocean's next tie-in, RoboCop."

Crash! gave the game 93%. Happy Computer gave the game an 81. Power Play gave the game 8 out of 10. ST Action gave the game 78%. Compute's Amiga Resource said "As a translation of a movie, Platoon works about as well as these things usually do, and better than most. We can also respect Data East for not making the game as bloody as some others might have done."

However, other reviewers were less impressed by the game, and pointed out its flaws, such as its high difficulty level, its frustrating controls, and its lack of replay value. ACE gave the game a score of 53%, commenting that "Sluggish control responses and scrolling ruin the game's playability, while the garishly clashy display makes it unappealing stuff to look at."

== Legacy ==
Ocean co-founder Jon Woods later commented that Platoon was instrumental in establishing their credibility with film studios. Their relationship with Orion Pictures directly led to the licence for RoboCop which became the UK's biggest selling game of the decade.

Ocean's 1990 game Lost Patrol featured many ideas originally designed for Platoon and was initially subtitled Platoon II.

In 1993, Commodore Force ranked the game at number 16 on its list of the top 100 Commodore 64 games.
