= Galaxy Fight: Universal Warriors =

1995 video game

- Arcade flyer
- Developer: Sunsoft (Note: Ported to Sega Saturn by Santaclaus)
- Publishers: JP: Sunsoft; WW: SNK
- Director: Yuichi Ueda
- Programmer: Shigetaka Inaba
- Artists: Atsuki Matsui; Daisuke Fukuda; Eiji Koyama
- Composers: Masato Araikawa; Takayuki Sasaki
- Platforms: Arcade, Neo Geo AES, Neo Geo CD, Sega Saturn, PlayStation
- Release: January 24, 1995: Arcade; WW: January 24, 1995 Neo Geo AES; WW: February 25, 1995 Neo Geo CD; JP: April 21, 1995; NA: October 1996 Saturn; JP: November 22, 1995; EU: June 1996; NA: July 3, 1996 PlayStation; EU: April 30, 1996; JP: May 3, 1996
- Genre: Fighting
- Modes: Single-player, multiplayer
- Arcade system: Neo Geo MVS

Galaxy Fight: Universal Warriors (Note: Japanese: ギャラクシーファイト: ユニバーサル・ウォーリアーズ, Hepburn: Gyarakushī Faito: Yunibāsaru U~ōriāzu; also known as Galaxy Fight) is a 1995 fighting game developed and published by Sunsoft for the Neo Geo arcade and home platforms. It was Sunsoft's second fighting game after their 1994 Super Famicom game Sugoi Hebereke, as well as their first side-viewed 2D fighting game. The MVS arcade version of Galaxy Fight uses 32 four-megabit ROM chips (a total of 16 megabytes of data).

The game received Sega Saturn and PlayStation home ports in 1996. Hamster Corporation re-released the game as part of their ACA Neo Geo series for the PlayStation 4, Xbox One, Nintendo Switch and Windows.

== Gameplay ==
Gameplay screenshot featuring a match between Roomi (left) and Juri (right) fighting each other.

Though Galaxy Fight is similar to Sunsoft's later game Waku Waku 7 (which uses the same engine), the games have few elements in common (one of them being the mid-boss, Bonus-Kun). The players choose one of eight characters and travel among the in-game solar system to defeat the opponents inhabiting each of the planets before they get the chance to fight Felden and settle their personal scores with him.

The game uses a four-button layout where the first three buttons are used for striking attacks of varying speed and power (they can be anything ranging from punches and kicks to tail whips and bites). The fourth button is used specifically for taunts which has no practical impact. Combining several buttons together may yield new attacks or special moves depending on the character.

There are no walls in the stages to corner players; instead, the screen can scroll indefinitely.

== Characters ==
=== Playable ===
- Alvan: Alvan is the "Prince of the Ruined Planet". 1,000 years ago, his planet Rozalis, was invaded and destroyed and his family was murdered by Felden. Luckily, Alvan managed to survive thanks to the magic crimson stone and challenges Felden to save the life of the few living beings that are still left in his planet. He is the game's shortest character by height and can sprout out a horn on his forehead as often shown during his intro and in his artworks. In Alvan's ending following a fierce battle between Alvan and Felden, Rozalis and its kingdom are both magically restored to its former glory, cleansed of the vanquished Felden's influence.
- Gunter: A gigantic green-skinned fire-breathing monster of immense power from the planet Guljeff. Only he and Alvan appear to recognize G. Done's mystical nature. Gunter's fighting style is simple yet extremely violent. He is the largest character in the game. He reappears in a Beats Of Rage mod called Vampire's Rage as an enemy character.
- Golden Done (G. Done): A mysterious brown-skinned alien in the form of an avant-garde thug from the planet Mani. Not much is known about him, except that both Alvan and Gunter were the only ones who sense upon his mystical nature. Being the less-powerful, secondary member of the two strange mythical beings, G. Done appears to be at a similar age as the omnipotent, primary Felden does. However, despite his background, he desires nothing more than his freedom in peace and is on a self-given mission regarding the reappeared tyrant, Felden himself. In G. Done's ending, the defeated Felden scornfully reminded him that if he dies, he'll wound up in the same fate as him.
- Juri: A female thief from the planet Lezaar that is obsessed with becoming stronger and more beautiful, she despises those she considers ugly. In her ending, Juri, having emerged victorious, speaks to the defeated Felden that if he's not strong nor beautiful, he will face such consequences. Not only that Juri will be stronger and more beautiful, but good fortune will soon belong to her.
- Kazuma: a samurai who also lives in Airrass. Also called "The Raging Storm", Kazuma travels with Rolf in his adventures throughout the galaxy, looking for powerful warriors, seeking to be stronger and continue with the tradition of the martial arts of his family.
- Musafar: Musafar is an enormous robot built by the Fakir Empire. His objective is to defeat all the warriors and get their unique abilities so that his Empire can take over the Galaxy. In his ending, Musafar travels back to his home planet intent on destroying the Empire, having recalled upon his apprehension and conversion into a robotic soldier tasked to collect and imitate techniques from the opponents. He is the second largest albeit the strongest of the playable characters.
- Rolf: The game's leading character. The self-proclaimed "Hero of the Galaxy" living in the planet Airrass. He fights in a battle suit that resembles a 20th-century space suit sans helmet, equipped with a short-range flamethrower, jetpack, small energy pistol, and an ear-mounted single-eye visor. His main goal was to defeat Felden and avenge the death of his three friends.
- Roomi: Roomi is an alien from the planet Lutecia. She has the special power to sense her opponent's feelings before they attack. She is ditsy, childish girl and her dream is to become popular, like Juri. During the course of the game, Rolf is commissioned by her father to bring her back home. In her ending, she becomes a singer that doubles as a fighter.

=== Non-Playable/Bosses ===
- Bonus Kun: Rouwe's own punching bag that has come to life. Rouwe has taught him basic fighting techniques. Bonus-Kun is a homage/parody of Ryu from Street Fighter.
- Yacopu: Yacopu is Rouwe's pet rabbit and the game's midboss, fought before Felden. He originated from the Nintendo Game Boy title, Trip World. He has the ability to shape-shift into whoever he fights against, providing a mirror match.
- Felden: The final boss of the game (excluding Rouwe). He is a being composed of golden flame with a fiery blue crown. When facing Alvan, Felden reveals that he was the one who placed the curse on Alvan's planet.
- Rouwe: A special boss that appears only if a player beats the game without losing a round. He was apparently responsible for the death of Kazuma's father. His punching bag became the character Bonus-kun and was playable in Waku Waku 7.

== Ports and related releases ==
Galaxy Fight: Universal Warriors was later ported to the Neo Geo AES home console, which includes easy-to-access difficulty settings and limited credits.

Its next port was the Neo Geo CD version, which was ported by Sunsoft and utilizes some of the same features as the Neo Geo AES version, but with arranged background music. This version was later ported to the Sega Saturn and released worldwide. Later, a Sony PlayStation port was released in Japan and Europe.

In 2008, the Neo Geo CD version of Galaxy Fight: Universal Warriors was included with the Neo Geo AES version of Sunsoft's other fighting game Waku Waku 7 in Vol.11 of the Neo Geo Online Collection series for the Sony PlayStation 2, titled Sunsoft Collection (サンソフトコレクション). While the Neo Geo CD soundtrack for Galaxy Fight: Universal Warriors was added in this version, the soundtrack for Waku Waku 7 is completely different from the unreleased Neo Geo CD version that was later ported to the Sega Saturn. SNK was unable to add the Neo Geo CD / Sega Saturn version of the soundtrack because of licensing issues.

The Neo Geo AES home console version of Galaxy Fight: Universal Warriors was later ported to the Wii Virtual Console in Japan by D4 Enterprise on March 23, 2010.

=== Soundtrack ===
Galaxy Fight -Universal Warriors-

Soundtrack album by Masato Araikawa (composer) Takayuki Sasaki (composer) Jun Kojime (performer)
- Released: March 17, 1995
- Recorded: Unknown
- Genre: Video game soundtrack
- Length: 51:44
- Labels: Pony Canyon; Scitron Label

A soundtrack album of the Neo-Geo version was released by Pony Canyon and Scitron Label on March 17, 1995 exclusively in Japan under the catalog number PCCB-00177. It contains nearly every background music, as well as sound effects and voice samples from the arcade version. It was composed by Masato Araikawa and Takayuki Sasaki, and performed by Jun Kojime.

== Reception ==
Reception

Review scores
Publication	Score
AllGame	(NG) 3/5
Consoles +	(NG) 81%
GameFan	(NG) 282/300 (SS) 237/300
GamePro	(NG) 15.5/20
HobbyConsolas	(NG) 84/100
M! Games	(NG) 52% (SS) 52%
Mega Fun	(NG)53% (SS) 57%
Micromanía	(NGCD) 82/100
Next Generation	(SS) 2/5
Nintendo Life	(NS) 4/10
Player One	(NG) 78% (SS) 85%
Superjuegos	(PS) 71/100 (SS) 72/100
Video Games (DE)	(NG) 79% (SS) 66%
Dengeki PlayStation	80/100, 75/100, 70/100, 70/100
Play Time	(NG) 53%
Última Generación	(NGCD) 60/100

In Japan, Game Machine listed Galaxy Fight: Universal Warriors on their March 15, 1995 issue as being the fourteenth most-popular arcade game at the time. The game received generally positive reception from critics since its release in arcades and other platforms, though some criticized the harsh level of difficulty and other design aspects. According to Famitsu, the Neo Geo CD version sold over 13,385 copies in its first week on the market.

AllGame's Kyle Knight praised the audiovisual presentation and controls, regarding it as a decent fighting game but stated that "Galaxy Fight's odd borderless gameplay may be its worst enemy, as many gamers will simply find the gameplay too odd and difficult to get used to." Consoles Plus' Richard Homsy commended the visual presentation, gameplay speed, audio and playability. GameFan's four reviewers praised the unique character roster and fighting mechanic, comparing the title's zooming effect with that of Art of Fighting. GamePro gave the Neo Geo version a positive review. They complimented the graphics, music, and the way each attack is suited to its particular character, but added that the game lacks the originality and polish to reach true greatness, concluding that "Galaxy Fight will definitely whet the appetite of fighters everywhere. But it doesn't provide the Big Bang needed to unseat Mortal or Killer in the arcades." Hobby Consolas' Javier Castellote gave positive remarks to the visuals, sound and gameplay but criticized the lack of additional characters and speed of each character, as well as their small size when compared to other Neo Geo fighters.

MAN!AC's Andreas Knauf criticized the careless technical presentation, regarding Galaxy Fight as a poor conventional fighting game lacking in gameplay innovations, though he commended the characters and their special attacks. Mega Fun's Stefan Hellert felt mixed in regards to the audiovisual presentation, stating that "The graphics don't even begin to use the capabilities of the Neo Geo, because apart from the admittedly absolutely fluid zoom effects and the fast course of the game, Galaxy Fight doesn't offer anything that a SNES couldn't do." Micromanía's C.S.G. reviewed the Neo Geo CD version and compared the game with both Fatal Fury 3 and Savage Reign. He praised the technical presentation and borderless gameplay but criticized the small character roster. Última Generación's Gonzalo Herrero also reviewed the Neo Geo CD version, comparing its space setting with Cosmic Carnage, and praised the audiovisual presentation as well.

The Sega Saturn conversion was met with a more mixed response from reviewers for being a straightforward conversion of the original arcade game. However, fan reception was positive; Readers of the Japanese Sega Saturn Magazine voted to give the Saturn port a 7.4698 out of 10 score, ranking at the number 526 spot, indicating a popular following. GameFan's four reviewers commended it for being a faithful port of the arcade original but criticized the gameplay. Next Generation reviewed the Saturn version several months after the game's release, asserting that the title "looks and plays like an average Neo-Geo fighter." In contrast, Player One's Christophe Delpierre gave positive remarks to the Saturn port in regards to audiovisual presentation and gameplay.

== See Also ==
- Astra Superstars
