= Batman (PC Engine video game) =

1990 video game

- Developer: Sunsoft
- Publisher: Sunsoft
- Producer: Cho Musou
- Composer: Nobuyuki Hara
- Series: Batman
- Platform: PC Engine
- Release: JP: October 12, 1990
- Genre: Action
- Mode: Single-player

Batman (Note: Japanese: バットマン, Hepburn: Battoman) is a 1990 action video game developed and published by Sunsoft for the PC Engine. Based on the DC Comics superhero Batman, it is inspired by the Warner Bros.'s 1989 film of the same name. In the main storyline, Batman must face the Joker. Controlling the titular character, the player explores and search for items and power-ups, while fighting enemies in mazes across five stages based on locations in the film.

Batman on the PC Engine was created by Sunsoft, which had previously worked on adaptations based on the 1989 film for the Nintendo Entertainment System, Game Boy, and Sega Mega Drive/Genesis. The game was produced by Cho Musou, while soundtrack was composed by Nobuyuki Hara. It was the last Batman game by Sunsoft to tie in with a movie. The game was first announced in 1989 as a platformer, but was later retooled into an action-maze game instead. It garnered mixed reception from critics.

== Gameplay ==
Gameplay screenshot

Batman is an action game played from a top-down perspective, reminiscent of Pac-Man and Bomberman. The players take control of Batman through four areas based on locations in the film, each one divided into twelve stages. Each distinct area has their own main objectives, such as retrieving "Smilex" chemicals in Gotham City, cleaning paintings at the Flugelheim museum, and setting up bombs at the Axis Chemicals factory. Controlling the titular character, the player explores and search for the items in mazes. The player can attack enemies with batarangs, and find power-ups to increase their range and shoot more batarangs.

== Development and release ==
Batman on the PC Engine was developed by Sunsoft, which had previously worked on video game adaptations based on Warner Bros.'s 1989 film of the same name for the Nintendo Entertainment System, Game Boy, and Sega Mega Drive/Genesis. It was the last Batman game by Sunsoft to tie in with a film. The PC Engine version was produced by Cho Musou, with supervision from Hiroyasu Eguchi. The soundtrack was composed by Nobuyuki Hara. The game was first announced in 1989, initially intended to be a side-view action game, but was later retooled into an top-down action-maze game instead (similar to the Bomberman franchise). The game was published by Sunsoft on October 12, 1990.

== Reception ==
Reception

Review scores
Publication	Score
AllGame	3.5/5 stars
Computer and Video Games	80%
Famitsu	6/10, 7/10, 7/10, 5/10
Gekkan PC Engine	70/100, 75/100, 75/100, 70/100, 70/100
Génération 4	7/10
Joystick	78%
Player One	70%
Raze	69%
Zero	77/100
Amstar Informatique	15/20
Console Ma'zine	55%
Power Play	47%

Batman on the PC Engine garnered mixed reception from critics. Micom BASIC Magazine ranked the game at the number twelve spot in popularity on their January 1991 issue. Console Ma'zine's Onn Lee found the game reminiscent of Doraemon: Meikyū Daisakusen. Lee applauded the visual presentation for its detailed and colorful graphics, expressive sprite animations, and "wicked" cutscenes between stages. He also praised the music, but found the sound effects very limited and expressed disappointment towards the lack of gameplay variety. Amstar Informatique commended the game's "superb" graphical quality, but noted its high difficulty. They also felt that the repetitive action might bore some players. Génération 4 commented that the PC Engine version has "nothing to do with the different adaptations made so far on microcomputers and consoles".

Joystick's Jean-Marc Demoly called Batman on the PC Engine a "sort of Pac-Man remix", but felt it was uninteresting due to its repetitive and monotonous gameplay compared to previous iterations by Sunsoft. However, Demoly found the character easy to control and commended the game's visuals. Player One's Olivier Scamps gave positive remarks to the colorful and detailed graphics, sprite animations, and catchy music, though he noted that the game was fundamentally repetitive. Scamps also found its difficulty to be easy. Computer and Video Games' Richard Leadbetter lauded the game's music and end-of-level cutscenes. Leadbetter also found its playability to be addictive, but felt its visuals were not the best the PC Engine could offer. Power Play's Heinrich Lenhardt said that the gameplay was simple but noted that it became more difficult in later levels, and criticized the game's lack of variety.

Raze's Les Ellis faulted the game for its poor presentation and repetitive gameplay, while a writer for Zero also found it disappointing due to its lacking presentation. AllGame's Shawn Sackenheim regarded it as an interesting concept, citing its top-down perspective similar to Pac-Man. Sackenheim commended the game's diverse artwork, soundscape, objective-based gameplay, and replay value. Hardcore Gaming 101's Chris Rasa wrote that "this PC Engine Batman game is not bad, but every gimmick in it will be exhausted long before the game's many levels are completed".
