= Hashire Hebereke =

1994 video game

- Developer: Sunsoft
- Publisher: Sunsoft
- Series: Hebereke
- Platforms: Super Famicom, Windows
- Release: Super Famicom: JP: December 22, 1994; PC: JP: October 11, 2011 (as Project EGG)
- Genre: Racing
- Modes: Single-player, Multiplayer

Hashire Hebereke (はしれへべれけ) is a 1994 racing game developed and published by Sunsoft exclusively in Japan for the Super Famicom on December 22, 1994. The game is the fifth installment in the Hebereke series. It was also re-released for Project EGG (Engrossing Game Gallery) as a Windows Store title on October 11, 2011 in Japan.

== Gameplay ==
The game takes place on an isometric view. Like many other racing games, the player has to outfast opponents and get first place. Instead of using karts like many other racing games, the characters run on their feet. The players can choose one of eight players: Hebe, O-Chan, Sukezaemon, Jennifer, Booboodori, Pen-Chan, Utsuzin, and Unyoon. Each character has their own unique abilities, advantages, and disadvantages. The way how the race is going to be represented depends on the options the players choose in the options menu. They can determine the CPU's difficulty, choose to see themselves through objects, and change the controls for the slippery racing controls by the simple left, right, up, down sequence or un-slippery controls by using simple and diagonal arrows. The player can gather items to either benefit them or hurt them back by accident. All of the dialogue scenes how there are represented on the map depends on what character they choose, as well as all of the endings too. The game is also compatible with 2 players where they can play regular racing and tag mode.

== Remake ==
Hashire Hebereke: EX was announced in 2024. After a delay, it is now planned for release in Spring 2026. The remake was developed by CRT Games and its remake is being published by Gravity Games Arise. The remake includes new characters, stages, eight-person online multiplayer, and a new time attack mode. The game is slated to be released on Nintendo Switch and PC.
