= Hebereke's Popoon =

1993 video game

- European SNES box art
- Developer: Sunsoft
- Publisher: Sunsoft
- Designer: Uchimich Ryoji
- Series: Hebereke
- Platforms: Super NES, arcade, Windows
- Release: Super NES: JP: December 22, 1993; EU: 1994 or 1995 (Note: Some sources state that game came out in either November 1994 or January 1995.); Arcade: JP: June 1994
- Genre: Puzzle
- Modes: Single-player, multiplayer

Hebereke's Popoon (Note: Japanese: へべれけのぽぷーん, Hepburn: Hebereke no Popūn) is a 1993 puzzle video game developed and published by Sunsoft. The game was first released for the Super Famicom in 1993 in Japan, and the SNES in Europe a year later, and was also ported to the arcades in 1994 in Japan only. It is the second game in the Hebereke series. Hebereke means drunk or untrustworthy, while Popoon is an onomatopoeia for the sound made by the game pieces when they explode.

The game is a Puyo Puyo clone where players align Popoons with others to make them explode.

== Gameplay ==
A screenshot of the first stage, showing Hebe fighting against Oh-Chan.

Hebereke's Popoon is a block-grouping game. There are four playable characters, each having different abilities. In story mode, the player is forced to play as Hebe and must battle certain characters. A defeated player may elect to resume play by using a continue. In versus mode, every playable character are immediately available to either player. Players can also select a handicap level (from 1 - 5) to increase or decrease the difficulty of the game.

In each round, pairs of Popoons of various colors (the set of colors varying with the character(s) chosen by the player(s)) descend from the top of the screen. These can be rotated and placed by the player. The immediate aim is to create groups of three blocks of the same color arranged either horizontally, vertically, or diagonally. When such a group is created, the member blobs blow up, disappearing from the screen. Any blobs above the disappearing group then drop to fill any resulting empty space.

Each time a player successfully creates a group, a Poro-poro will drop on the other player's screen in a random position. These poro-porous can be removed by the other player by placing a blob of the same color as the head such that it touches the head either horizontally or vertically. Both the head and the blob will disappear from the screen, in much the same manner as group of blobs, though no head will appear on the first player's screen as a result.

A player can sometimes cause multiple groups to disappear. This can happen simultaneously if the placement of a pair of blobs immediately causes two groups of blobs (or heads) to form or it can happen in a chain reaction, as the formation and disappearance of one group causes the dropping of any pieces above it, which can result in the formation of another group, and so on. If the groups in either process are of different colors then this is said to be a combination or "combo". The colors in a combo (or even a group) appear as small tiles in the lower of two panes in the middle of the screen and above the score-box.

While a combo of one color (simply an ordinary group) causes a single head to appear on the opponent's screen, a combo of two colors causes a full row of poro-porous to appear on the opponent's screen. Combos of three and four colors are much more dramatic, the precise effect depending on the player's character. Upcoming heads or special effects are kept track of by symbols placed by the players' characters in the upper of two panels in the middle of the screen.

A notable feature in Hebereke's Popoon is the constant bevy of sound effects as each player's character celebrates each group or combo by making nonsense sounds or yelling Japanese phrases.

== Release ==
According to the Video Arcade Preservation Society, via their website Killer List of Video Games, the arcade machine itself is very rare, if it still exists in cabinet form at all.

== Reception ==
Reception

Review scores
Publication	Score
Computer and Video Games	91/100
M! Games	63%
Mega Fun	47%
Official Nintendo Magazine	90/100
Superjuegos	81/100
Total!	90/100 (UK); 3+ (DE)
Video Games (DE)	84% (SNES)
Games World	84/100 (SNES)
Play Time	71% (SNES)
Super Gamer	88/100 (SNES)

Award
Publication	Award
Total! (1995)	#55 Top 100 SNES Games

Hebereke's Popoon garnered generally favorable reception from critics. Computer and Video Games's Ed Lawrence and Mark Patterson praised the game's graphics, sound, and playability. While reckoning that the single-player mode was tame, both Automatic and Patterson were fond of its head-to-head mode, noting the use of special attacks and fast speed on higher levels. Video Games' Dirk Sauer felt mixed regarding the visuals and sound effects, but found both its music and gameplay to be addictive, the latter of which he noted for being initially difficult. Nintendo Magazine System's Paul Davies and Andy McVittie lauded its stylish and colorful imagery, audio, and compelling playability, but both felt that the game was less fun in single-player. Superjuegos' Javier Iturrioz commended the diverse music, and quality of the characters' voices. However, Iturrioz felt that it did not offer any novelty compared to Puyo Puyo and stated that its graphics, while colorful, were limited by the game's nature. Total!'s Josse and Atko gave positive remarks to the audiovisual presentation, gameplay, and overall longevity, finding it to be more fun than Super Puyo Puyo. Writing for the German edition, Michael Anton criticized its lack of depth but praised it for being a nice alternative to Tetris with usual gaudy Japanese graphics.

Games World's four reviewers compared the gameplay with Dr Robotnik's Mean Bean Machine. Nevertheless, they gave it an overall positive outlook. MAN!AC's Martin Gaksch regarded it to be a fun Columns clone, commending its different game modes but was annoyed at the lack of multiplayer variants. In contrast to the other critics, Mega Fun's Götz Schmiedehause faulted the game for is visuals and audio. Play Time's Ulf Schneider noted its difficulty level and limited options. Super Gamer's three reviewers wrote that "Hebereke's Popoon relies more on chance than Super Puyo Puyo, which makes it just that crucial bit less satisfying." In 1995, Total! ranked the game as number 55 on its list of the top 100 SNES games, stating that it was "A bit like Kirby's Avalanche. If you like these puzzlers then it's an absolute must." Hardcore Gaming 101's Federico Tiraboschi concurred with both Sauer and Schneider about the game's difficulty.

== See also ==
- Hebereke series
