= Super Fantasy Zone =

1992 video game

- PAL region box art
- Developer: Sunsoft
- Publishers: JP: Sunsoft; EU: Sega
- Composer: Naoki Kodaka
- Series: Fantasy Zone
- Platform: Mega Drive
- Release: JP: January 14, 1992; EU: 1993
- Genre: Scrolling shooter
- Mode: Single-player

Super Fantasy Zone (スーパーファンタジーゾーン, Sūpā Fantajī Zōn) is a 1992 scrolling shooter video game developed and published by Sunsoft for the Mega Drive. Part of Sega's Fantasy Zone series, it was released only in Japan and Europe. Players control the character Opa-Opa on his quest to defeat Dark Menon, and the game plays similarly to previous Fantasy Zone entries. The game plays similarly to Defender, where the screen scrolls in the direction that Opa-Opa is going. The player shoots at enemies to defeat them, collecting gold coins that are used to purchase temporary upgrades that improve Opa-Opa's offensive capabilities and speed, among other things.

A Virtual Console version was released in July 2008, making its debut in North America. It is included in the Sega Mega Drive Mini, and was re-released on the Nintendo Classics service. The original Mega Drive release received positive reception, as did the Virtual Console re-release. Praise was given to its challenging gameplay, colorful visuals, and soundtrack. However, some critics identified the challenge as being prohibitively high, while other critics felt that it had pacing issues.

== Gameplay ==
Super Fantasy Zone is a scrolling shooter in which the player takes control of Opa-Opa, a winged, sentient spaceship who can either fly or walk on the ground. He can also scroll to the left or right depending on Opa-Opa's direction, similar to the video game Defender. It is a single-player game, and the player's goal is to destroy every enemy generator, leading to them fighting a boss battle at the end of that level.

The player can upgrade Opa-Opa's weapon loadout by collecting gold coins dropped by destroyed enemies, with varying amount of gold dropped depending on the enemy. These upgrades can be used to change various aspects of Opa-Opa, including his speed, offensive capabilities, and ability to light the area. Different weapons can be used, including one with a wide spread shot, one that shoots behind Opa-Opa, one that shoots a laser, and more. These upgrades eventually run out, regardless of whether they are used or not. The game allows players to use a rapid fire option to fight enemies. The game features a reference to the shooter Space Harrier, including a code that replaces the music with Space Harrier music.

== Plot ==
The game follows Opa-Opa as he fights to avenge the death of his father, (O-papa), who was killed defending the Fantasy Zone against the invading "Dark Menon". Opa-Opa must rid the Fantasy Zone of the minions of the Dark Menon and restore peace.

== Development ==
Super Fantasy Zone was developed and published by Sunsoft for the Sega Mega Drive, originally released on January 14, 1992 in Japan before releasing in Europe in 1993. Sunsoft previously developed the Famicom version of the first game, Fantasy Zone. The soundtrack to the game was composed by Naoki Kodaka, and features themes from the original Fantasy Zone game composed by Hiroshi Kawaguchi. Super Fantasy Zone was released on the Wii's Virtual Console service on May 7, 2008 in Japan. Later, it was released in Europe on June 27, 2008 and on July 21, 2008 in North America.

It was featured in a collection of Fantasy Zone games released for the PlayStation 2 in Japan on September 11, 2008 in the Sega Ages series. Super Fantasy Zone was released on the Nintendo Switch's Nintendo Classics service on March 17, 2022, as part of its Mega Drive collection. It was also featured as part of the Mega Drive Mini on September 19, 2019, a collection of video games released on the Mega Drive. There was discussion about whether to include the Mega Drive version of Fantasy Zone, but the team decided that they didn't want to include two Fantasy Zone games, and since the original game was getting a release on the Nintendo Switch, they felt it would be less impactful.

== Reception ==
Gameplay of Super Fantasy Zone. Critics praised the visuals for their wide color palette.

Super Fantasy Zone received generally positive reception for its Mega Drive release from contemporary reviewers. Power Play staff recommended that people who enjoy cuter games would enjoy it, praising its music and graphics, as well as the gameplay, which they identified as being challenging for beginners and professionals alike. Multiple reviewers for Sega Force magazine reviewed it positively, both considering it a good shoot 'em up while noting its visuals as quality. Sega Pro staff felt it was enjoyable "for a few hours," though players may grow "weary" of it. MEGA Force Magazine staff speculated that the designers must have enjoyed making the visuals and premise of the levels, overall enjoying the game.

Despite the positive reception, some critics were less enthused. Writer Kirk Rutter felt that it was "nicely put together," stating that while he thought shoot 'em ups "should be basic," Super Fantasy Zone suffered from both a "lack of ideas" and substance. He also felt that it was a better fit for Mega Drive newcomers. Joypad Magazine writer J'm DESTROY felt that, despite its appearance, Super Fantasy Zone was a good shooter, praising the ability to scroll both left and right for giving the game more variety. However, fellow Joypad Magazine writer O.Prezeau felt it was boring, feeling that the goal in each level is too similar to one another. MegaTech writers Paul and Mark felt lukewarm about the game, with Mark feeling let down due to its initial promise. He felt that younger players would find it lacking, commenting that both its visual style and gameplay are "laid back." Paul, meanwhile, felt it was a standard Mega Drive shoot 'em up experience, though also that Fantasy Zone fans would enjoy it.

Later online reviews were positive towards the game. Hardcore Gaming 101 writer Kurt Kalata felt that Super Fantasy Zone was the first sequel to the original Fantasy Zone arcade game that "not only matches, but surpasses its predecessor in aesthetics, with gorgeous graphics and an insanely catchy soundtrack." He noted how its visuals defy the Mega Drive's limited color palette, and the music was among the best on the platform. He also commented that, despite being challenging, the game was not frustrating, owing this to being designed as a home console game instead of an arcade game. Writer Ken Horowitz begrudged that Super Fantasy Zone never came to the US, especially when considering poor-quality Mega Drive games that released there. He noted that the challenge ramps up significantly when fighting a boss, and appreciated the simple controls. He recommended it, though noted that "diehard fans" of shoot 'em ups might find the pace a little slow before they adjust. Cubed3 writer David Kelly felt that it was simple even by comparison to its contemporaries, praising it for being "highly entertaining" and giving commendation for making a faithful sequel despite being a different developer. Game designer Ste Wilson identified Super Fantasy Zone as a favorite game of his childhood, stating that it, along with Fantasy Zone, inspired how his game, Super Mega Space Blaster, handled bosses. IGN writer Levi Buchanan enjoyed the game, noting that it would likely only be appealing to fans of the series. He praised it for its gameplay, controls, music, and visuals, hoping to see it released on the Wii's Virtual Console.

The Virtual Console release was similarly well received. IGN writer Lucas M. Thomas agreed with Levi's assessment, echoing similar praise, though suggesting that players new to the series may want to try the original Fantasy Zone first. Official Nintendo Magazine staff felt that it was a good value for the quality behind it, though noting that players may get frustrated while playing. NintendoLife writer Corbie Dillard, in his review of the Virtual Console re-release, felt it was a good Virtual Console release, noting that while its difficulty may prove too frustrating for some players, people who are into "highly difficult" games like this would have fun. Eurogamer writer Dan Whitehead appreciated how Super Fantasy Zone contrasted with the Wii's typically "deadly serious shooters" on the Virtual Console, He felt that it was not among the greatest of the genre, but still enjoyed it. Nintendo Power writer Steve T. recommended it, stating it was an improvement over the Master System release of Fantasy Zone in terms of presentation, stating that its "surreal charm" helps it stand out from other shooters. Staff for the Venezuelan Club Nintendo magazine, in a review of Super Fantasy Zone, compared its visual style to the Kirby series, suggesting it did not require much skill to play, making it more accessible.
