= Batman (Genesis video game) =

- North American box art
- Developer: Sunsoft
- Publishers: JP/NA: Sunsoft; EU: Sega
- Producer: Kiharu Yoshida
- Programmers: Yoshitaka Kawabe; Hiroaki Atsumi
- Artists: Yoshiaki Iwata; Kazutomo Mori; Masayuki Aikawa; Yabu Chan; Rieko Sakai; Akira
- Composers: Naoki Kodaka; Shinichi Seya
- Series: Batman
- Platform: Sega Genesis/Mega Drive
- Release: JP: July 27, 1990; NA: June 1991; EU: July 1992
- Genre: Beat 'em up
- Mode: Single-player

Batman is a 1990 beat 'em up video game developed and published by Sunsoft for the Sega Genesis, based on the 1989 film of the same name. The game is more faithful to the film's plot than the NES game of the same name, and includes levels in which the player controls Batman's vehicles.

== Development ==
The music was composed by Naoki Kodaka, who also wrote the music for the NES game.

== Reception ==
Reception

Aggregate score
| Aggregator | Score |
|---|---|
| GameRankings | 70% |

Review scores
| Publication | Score |
|---|---|
| Electronic Gaming Monthly | 8/10, 8/10, 8/10, 8/10 |
| IGN | 6/10 |
| Mega Play | 31/40 |
| Console XS | 82% |
| Mega Action | 83% |
| MegaTech | 83% |

IGN gave the game a review score of 6/10, praising the gameplay and its faithfullness to the film but noted the game as short and not especially challenging. The game holds an aggregate score of 70% on GameRankings. Mega Play's four reviewers gave Batman very positive reviews and praised the game's graphics and gameplay, although they commented that the game is not as challenging and the gameplay is a little slow. Console XS gave an overall review score of 82%. Mega Action gave a review score of 83% and praised the game's graphics. Megatech magazine praised the graphics and sound, calling it "truly tremendous" and described the backgrounds as "sombre-looking as the sets in the film". It also lauded the game's soundtrack. The only criticism they had was the game being fairly easy to beat. The four reviewers of Electronic Gaming Monthly gave Batman very positive reviews, praising the gameplay staying true to the film and praised the graphics, music and sound effects and one reviewer opined the game is "the ultimate side scrolling action game for the genesis". They criticized the game being too easy and short.

== See also ==
- List of Batman video games
