= O-Chan no Oekaki Logic =

1995 Japan-exclusive puzzle video game

- Sega Saturn cover art
- Developer: Sunsoft (Note: Although some sources claim the game was made by Game Studio, the game was actually developed by Sunsoft themselves. In fact, the staff roll only lists Sunsoft employees and Game Studio's site had no mentions of the game, thus debunking this rumor.)
- Publisher: Sunsoft
- Series: Hebereke
- Platforms: PlayStation; Sega Saturn; Super Famicom; WonderSwan; Palm OS; Mobile
- Release: PlayStation: JP: September 8, 1995 (Note: Rereleased on October 1, 1998 and January 11, 2001 as part of the Sunkore Best and Value 1500 programs, respectively.); Sega Saturn: JP: November 17, 1995; Super Famicom: JP: December 1, 1995; WonderSwan: JP: January 6, 2000; Palm OS: JP: 2002; Mobile: JP: 2002
- Genres: Puzzle; Nonogram
- Mode: Single-player

O-Chan no Oekaki Logic (Note: Japanese: おーちゃんのお絵かきロジック, Hepburn: Ōchan no Oekaki Rojikku) is a Japan-exclusive puzzle game based on the popular nonogram game. The game is considered to be a spin-off of Sunsoft's Hebereke series. Its first release was on the PlayStation on September 8, 1995, and would later be ported onto other platforms ever since. The game has received 2 sequels. It is the only game in the Hebereke series to feature Utsuzin as the main villain, rather than Unyohn. A European version, named Oh-Chan's Logic, was planned, but was cancelled.

== Plot (Note: Sega Saturn version only.) ==
O-Chan and Hebe are walking on a grass field. All of a sudden, Utsuzin suddenly captured Hebe in a UFO. O-Chan tries to run after him, but she's too late. Then she ventures to rescue Hebe from Utsuzin's lair.

The ending shows O-Chan waking from her bed, indicating (but not explaining) that it was a dream.

== Gameplay ==
Screenshot from the Super Famicom version.

The game presents the player with a puzzle grid. The player should chisel the grid; if done correctly, the player will win the game.

The game also has a multiplayer mode in which the player must chisel the grid in order to beat the other player.

The game even has an edit mode in which the player can create their own puzzles.

The Sega Saturn version included a story mode in which the player must verse opponents that come out of their way. The player can also complete to get better times on that mode, as they are timed.

The game has a tutorial mode, which teaches the player how to play the game.

== Sequels ==
=== O-Chan no Oekaki Logic 2 ===
On September 27, 1996, (Note: Rereleased on July 1, 1999 and January 11, 2001 as part of the Sunkore Best and Value 1500 programs, respectively.) O-Chan no Oekaki Logic 2 (Note: Japanese: おーちゃんのお絵かきロジック2, Hepburn: Ōchan no Oekaki Rojikku Tsū) was released on the PlayStation. It was also ported to the WonderSwan on January 6, 2000, though the "2" was dropped from the title, as it was the only game in the series released for that platform. The game featured new puzzles, music tracks, and updated visuals. The game also added a painting mode, in which the puzzle grid must be filled with color.

=== O-Chan no Oekaki Logic 3 ===
The final entry in the series, known as O-Chan no Oekaki Logic 3 (Note: Japanese: おーちゃんのお絵かきロジック3, Hepburn: Ōchan no Oekaki Rojikku Surī), was released on January 11, 2001 exclusively on the PlayStation. The game uses the same engine as the first game, featuring more levels; the game lacked the additions the second game had.

== O-Chan no Oekaki desu wa ==
O-Chan no Oekaki desu wa (Note: Japanese: おーちゃんのお絵かきですは, Hepburn: Ōchan no Oekaki desu wa) was released in 2004 for mobile devices. It was the final game in the Hebereke series for over 20 years. Little information is known about this release. As its name suggests, it is a remake of the first game.
