= Hebereke's Popoitto =

1994 video game

- Front cover of the European SNES version.
- Developers: Sunsoft; Success (PS1, Saturn)
- Publishers: Sunsoft; Marubeni; Ludi
- Series: Hebereke
- Platforms: Arcade; SNES; Sega Saturn; Sony PlayStation
- Release: 1994: Arcade; JP: 1994 Sega Saturn; JP: March 3, 1995; EU: December 1995 PlayStation; JP: May 26, 1995 June 3, 1999 (SunKore Best) October 4, 2001 (Value 1500); EU: March 1, 1996 SNES; JP: July 28, 1995; EU: September 30, 1995
- Genre: Puzzle
- Modes: Single-player, two players competitive

Hebereke's Popoitto (Note: Known in Japan as Popoitto Hebereke (ポポイっとへべれけ) and Hebereke Station Popoitto (へべれけスてーショんポポイっと, Hebereke Sutēshon Popoitto), the latter as a name only used for the PlayStation version.) is a puzzle-type video game in the Hebereke series developed by Sunsoft for arcades, the Sega Saturn, PlayStation and SNES consoles. Although released in Japan and Europe from 1994 to 1996, it was never released in North America. The gameplay is reminiscent of video game titles like Dr. Mario and Puyo Puyo. Hebereke's Popoitto received generally positive reviews, and was mostly recommended for fans of the puzzle genre.

In Japan, Hebereke Station Popoitto was re-released in 1999 under the SunKore Best label. It was later re-released again in 2001 under the Value 1500 label.

== Gameplay ==
Screenshot of Stage 1

Similar to other falling block tile-matching video games, the core gameplay element consists of player-controlled blocks falling from the top of the playing field. In Hebereke's Popoitto, pairs of blocks, where each block in the pair can be any available color, appear from the top of the playing field and continue to fall until they fall on top of the ground or another block. The pair of blocks are, as long as they're still falling, controlled by the player and can be rotated. When a pair of blocks is suspended, a new pair of player-controlled blocks will fall from playing field ceiling. By lining up four or more blocks with the same color in certain formations the whole formation disappears. The available formations can be straight horizontal or vertical lines or simply just any adjoining formation, depending on the set difficulty level.

What sets Hebereke's Popoitto apart from other similar games is that moving creatures, named Poro-porous, will float suspended in mid-air on the playing field. Sporadically, Poro-porous will move one space right, left, up or down. Touching a Poro-poro with a pair of blocks will as always suspend the blocks, and consequently the erratic behaviour of Poro-porous makes it more difficult for the player to plan ahead. Each Poro-poro has its own color and can be, just as with any other block, destroyed by making a formation with the same color. A game is won when every Poro-poro on the playing field is eliminated. A game can also be lost when the blocks fill up to the top of the playing field.

The difficulty level controls, as stated earlier, the possible formations to build. An easier difficulty level will accept any adjoining formation of same-colored blocks, while a harder difficulty level will only accept straight horizontal or vertical lines. A higher difficulty level will also control the number of different available colors for blocks and the number of Poro-porous that are on the playing field at start.

=== Modes ===
In a single-player game, there is a story mode feature. It allows the player to travel to different worlds with an on-screen map and meet other characters. If a battle against another character is won, which is accomplished by winning two rounds, the defeated character becomes playable.

Additionally, a multiplayer mode is available, where two players battle each other simultaneously. Specific for the two-player mode is a kind of special attack, which can be activated by eliminating more than one formation of blocks with one pair of blocks. A handicap level can be set individually for each player.

== Reception ==
Reception

Review scores
| Publication | Score |
|---|---|
| Famitsu | 20/40 (SNES) |
| Play | (PS1) 43% |
| Famitsu PS (JP) | 25/40 (PS) |
| Player One (FR) | 82% (PS/SAT) |
| Sega Saturn Magazine (UK) | 68% (Saturn) |
| Super Power (FR) | 90% (SNES) |
| Super Play | 86% (SNES) |
| Total! (DE) | 3- out of 5 |

Hebereke's Popoitto was featured in several European video game magazines, and received mixed to positive reviews. The addicting gameplay and two-player mode were especially noted as highlights of the game. Still, the game, which was heavily compared to other puzzle video games, was mostly recommended for fans of the said genre. In Super Play, the reviewer liked the core gameplay, but did not like the game as much as Super Puyo Puyo, another SNES puzzle video game. A critic from Sega Saturn Magazine disliked that the special moves in the two-player mode were too difficult to obtain. In addition, the critic thought that the erratic movement of the Poro-porous made it too hard to plan ahead. A reviewer from the French video-gaming magazine Super Power considered the Poro-poro addition to be charming, but noted that Hebereke's Popoitto wasn't that strong graphically.

Notably, Hebereke's Popoitto was ranked as the 98th best SNES game of all time in Super Play's top 100 best SNES games list.
