= Sugoi Hebereke =

1994 video game

- Front cover of Sugoi Hebereke.
- Developers: Sunsoft; OLM
- Publisher: Sunsoft
- Composers: Kansei Craftwork; Prophet Kazuo; Naoki Kodaka
- Series: Hebereke
- Platforms: Super Famicom, mobile phone
- Release: JP: March 11, 1994
- Genre: Fighting
- Modes: Single-player, multiplayer

Sugoi Hebereke (すごいへべれけ, lit. "Amazing Hebereke") is a 1994 fighting game developed and published by Sunsoft in Japan for the Super Famicom on March 11, 1994. It is a spin-off of the Hebereke series, as well as Sunsoft's first attempt in the genre before they became better known for the 1995's Galaxy Fight: Universal Warriors, the 1996's Waku Waku 7, and the 1998's Astra Superstars.

== Gameplay ==
Sugoi Hebereke is played from an overhead "bird's-eye" view like Vectorbeam's 1979 arcade game Warrior, but with brawling elements similar to the ones found in Atari Games' 1990 Pit-Fighter arcade, Technōs Japan's 1992 Nekketsu Kakutō Densetsu, Namco's 1994 The Outfoxies, and Nintendo's 1999 Super Smash Bros. There are two play modes in the game: story mode and VS. mode. In VS. mode, up to four players can play as the cast of the Hebereke series simultaneously when using an SNES Multitap. The object of the game is to knock out (KO) the other three opponents. Each stage is square-shaped and has its own environmental hazards and moving objects.

== Release ==
On June 25, 1994, Sugoi Hebereke's soundtrack was included with the soundtracks of three other titles in the Hebereke series and the Gimmick! soundtrack, all in one album titled Takusan Hebereke ("A Lot of Hebereke"), which was published by Datam Polystar and distributed by PolyGram in Japan. The Sugoi Hebereke soundtrack was also included with the soundtracks of two Hebereke titles and Gimmick! in the album Sunsoft Music Collection Vol.3 (サンソフト ミュージックコレクション Vol.3), which was published by Wave Master also in Japan on November 30, 2011. The game was re-released on December 18, 2020 via the Nintendo Classics service in Japan, and on April 11, 2024 in Western regions; for the latter release, the game is given the English title of Amazing Hebereke. The Nintendo Classics re-release version was the game's U.S. debut.

== Reception ==
Hardcore Gaming 101 writer Federico Tiraboschi found the gameplay shallow when played alone due to how "bare-bones and easy" it is, though still found it fun when played in multiplayer.
