= Ufouria: The Saga 2 =

2024 video game

- Developer: Sunsoft
- Publishers: Red Art Games; Sun Corporation
- Series: Hebereke
- Engine: Unity
- Platforms: Nintendo Switch, PlayStation 5, Windows, Xbox Series X/S
- Release: JP: February 29, 2024; WW: March 1, 2024
- Genres: Platformer, Metroidvania
- Mode: Single-player

Ufouria: The Saga 2 is a 2024 platformer developed and published by Sunsoft. It is a sequel to the 1991 Nintendo Entertainment System title Ufouria: The Saga. The game was released in March 2024 and received positive reviews from critics. In Japan, the Ufouria series is known as Hebereke.

== Gameplay ==
Ufouria: The Saga 2 is a platformer with Metroidvania and roguelike elements. It serves as a reboot of 1991's Ufouria: The Saga. The player can unlock and play as 4 characters (Hebe, Ō-Chan, Sukezaemon, and Jennifer) who all have different purchasable abilities/attributes that reward the player with new gameplay opportunities in levels. Stages from the original game now have randomized elements every time you enter.

Sunsoft described the game as an "authentic evolution of the original Ufouria".

== Development and Release ==
In October 2023, the game was announced for release in early 2024. The next month, it was announced that the game would release for Microsoft Windows and Nintendo Switch on February 29, 2024 in Japan. In January 2024, it was announced that the game would release for all current generation platforms worldwide on March 1, 2024.

Sunsoft worked with real felt models while developing the game. In North America, Video Games Plus distributed ESRB-rated physical editions for PlayStation 5 and Switch. In Europe, Red Art Games distributed PEGI-rated physical editions for PlayStation 5, Xbox Series, and Switch. Red Art Games also sold an exclusive "Deluxe Edition" for PlayStation 5 and Switch, limited to 500 copies per platform. The deluxe edition contains a copy of the game with a reversible cover, an exclusive sleeve featuring alternative cover art inspired by the original game's Japanese cover, a manual, and a CD of both Ufouria: The Saga and Ufouria: The Saga 2's soundtracks.

== Reception ==
Reception

Aggregate score
| Aggregator | Score |
|---|---|
| Metacritic | Switch: 77/100 |

Review scores
| Publication | Score |
|---|---|
| Destructoid | 7/10 |
| Nintendo Life | 7/10 |
| Nintendo World Report | 9/10 |

The game received generally positive reviews from critics. Destructoid praised the game's art style and overall aesthetic. They criticised the game's "simplicity", scoring it a 7/10.

Nintendo Life also awarded the game a 7/10, criticizing the game's easy difficulty but complimenting it for being "visually and thematically wacky and endearing".
