= Hebereke =

Video game series

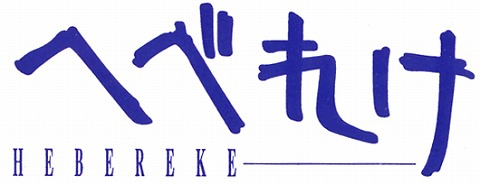
- Genre: Various
- Developers: Sunsoft; Success
- Publisher: Sunsoft
- Platforms: Family Computer, Arcade, Super Famicom, Sega Saturn, PlayStation
- First release: Hebereke; September 20, 1991
- Latest release: Hebereke 2 February 29, 2024

Hebereke (Note: Japanese: へべれけ; Japanese pronunciation: [hebeɾeke]) is a video game series developed by Sunsoft that was released primarily in Japan, with a few releases in Europe and Australia and one release in North America. It was one of the company's main franchises during the 1990s.

Hebe, the main character of the series, became Sunsoft's main mascot during this period, appearing on the company's logo in several games and commercials. The series features a comical, yet surreal setting and characters. The title of the series comes from a Japanese colloquialism for drunkenness. The series covers several different genres from platforming to puzzle, though they are all set in the same fictional universe. Although there are 9 games in the series, only 3 of them were released outside of Japan: Ufouria: The Saga for the NES, Hebereke's Popoon for the SNES, and Hebereke's Popoitto for the SNES, PlayStation, and Sega Saturn. All three of these games were only released in Japan and Europe, with no North American release, although Ufouria: The Saga would be released on the Wii Virtual Console in North America almost 18 years later, and on the Wii U Virtual Console in North America almost 22 years later.

The first Hebereke game for the Nintendo Entertainment System was released in the PAL region under the title of Ufouria: The Saga, which changed the names of the main characters, while two of them had their looks changed. A North American release was planned, but canceled alongside Mr. Gimmick due to its quirky character design; however, the PAL region version was later added to the Wii Virtual Console in North America. A later set of games for the Super Nintendo Entertainment System were also released under the Hebereke title, which retained the original names and looks from the Japanese version.

== List of games ==
Developer Sunsoft used the characters and world featured in Hebereke in a series of games for Family Computer, Super Famicom, Sega Saturn, PlayStation, coin-operated arcades and mobile phones.

Title	Developer	Platform(s)	Genre	Release date	Notes
Hebereke (Ufouria: The Saga)	^{FC/NES}Sunsoft^{i-mode}Space Out	NES/Famicom i-mode	Action-adventure	^{FC}September 20, 1991^{NES}November 19, 1992^{i-mode}August 18, 2003	Re-released on PlayStation with Rough World as Sunsoft Memorial Vol.5, which itself, was later re-released on the PlayStation Network in Japan on November 24, 2010. Ufouria was originally planned to be released in America, but was cancelled alongside Mr. Gimmick due to its quirky character design, though David Siller, Sunsoft of America's former vice president of development, stated both would have been commercial successes. In 2010, the game was released on the Wii's Virtual Console service in both the PAL region and North America, marking it the first Hebereke game to be released in the latter region.
Hebereke's Popoon	^{SFC/SNES}Falcon^{Arcade}Success	SFC/SNES i-mode	Puzzle	^{SFC}December 22, 1993^{SNES}1994^{i-mode}c. 2003	This is the first Hebereke game to keep the Japanese character designs in PAL regions.
Sugoi Hebereke	^{SFC}Sunsoft, OLM^{i-mode}Space Out	SFC i-mode	Fighting	^{SFC}March 11, 1994^{i-mode}2003	This is the only Hebereke game to be rereleased via the Nintendo Switch Online service.
Hebereke no Oishii Puzzle wa Irimasen ka	^{SFC}Falcon	SFC	Puzzle	August 31, 1994	This game is actually a port of Sunsoft's arcade game "Oishii Puzzle wa Irimasen ka?". The title roughly translates to "Don't You Need Hebereke's Delicious Puzzle?".
Hashire Hebereke	Sunsoft	SFC	Foot-racing (racing sub-genre)	December 22, 1994	This is the only Hebereke game to have isometric gameplay.
Popoitto Hebereke (Hebereke's Popoitto)	^{PS1/Saturn}Success^{SFC/SNES}Sunsoft^{i-mode}Space Out	PlayStation; Saturn; SFC/SNES i-mode	Puzzle	^{Saturn (JPN)}March 3, 1995^{Saturn (PAL)}1995^{PS1 (JPN)}May 26, 1995^{PS1 (EUR)}March 1, 1996^{SFC}July 28, 1995^{SNES}September 30, 1995^{i-mode}c. 2003	The Japanese PlayStation version was titled Hebereke Station Popoitto, and was eventually re-released on June 3, 1999 and October 4, 2001 under the "SunKore Best" and "Value 1500" labels, respectively.
O-Chan no Oekaki Logic	Sunsoft (Note: Although some sources claim the game was made by Game Studio, the game was actually developed by Sunsoft themselves. In fact, the staff roll only lists Sunsoft employees and Game Studio's site had no mentions of the game, thus debunking this rumor.)^{i-mode}Space Out	PlayStation; Saturn; SFC/SNES; Palm OS i-mode	Puzzle	^{PS1}September 9, 1995^{Saturn}November 17, 1995^{SFC}December 1, 1995^{Palm OS/i-mode}2002	Japanese PlayStation version re-released on October 1, 1998 and January 11, 2001 under the "SunKore Best" and "Value 1500" labels, respectively.
O-Chan no Oekaki Logic 2	Sunsoft	PlayStation; WonderSwan	Puzzle	^{PS1}September 27, 1996^{WS}January 6, 2000	Japanese PlayStation version re-released on July 1, 1999 and January 11, 2001 under the "SunKore Best" and "Value 1500" labels, respectively. The game was also released on the WonderSwan, albeit with the "2" being dropped from the title.
Hebereke no Pair Pair Wars	Sunsoft	Neo Geo	Puzzle	Unreleased (planned to release in 1996)	This is the only Hebereke game to be cancelled.
O-Chan no Oekaki Logic 3	Sunsoft	PlayStation	Puzzle	January 11, 2001	Unlike its predecessors, it was only re-released under the "Value 1500" label. Despite it being the third in the series, it actually uses the first game's engine, lacking the additions from the second game.
O-Chan no Oekaki desu wa	Space Out	i-mode	Puzzle	2004	The game is a remake of the original O-Chan no Oekaki Logic.
Hebereke 2 (Ufouria: The Saga 2)	Sunsoft	Nintendo Switch; PlayStation 5 Xbox Series X/S; Windows	Action-adventure	February 29, 2024	First sequel to Hebereke, and the first game in the franchise in 25 years since Popoitto Hebereke.
Hebereke: Enjoy Edition	Sunsoft, Jaleco	Nintendo Switch; Windows	Action adventure	March 28, 2024	Enhanced rerelease of the first Hebereke game.

== Cameos ==
- The Hebereke characters made a cameo appearance in Sunsoft's Mega Drive port of Lemmings, appearing in level 18 of the "Sunsoft" setting.
- O-Chan appears on one of the courts in Yeh Yeh Tennis (Wai Wai Tennis 2 in Japan) for the PlayStation.
- Hebereke was listed as a graphics designer in the credits of Journey to Silius in 1990.
- Hebe appears as art on a snowboard in the Sunsoft-published dating sim Photo Genic for the PC-98, PlayStation, and Saturn.
- The characters from Hebereke made an appearance in Barcode World, along with other Sunsoft characters, but only as cards that come with the game.
- Hebe appears as a random encounter in Benkei Gaiden: Suna no Shō, having the highest granting experience in the entire game.
- In Honō no Tōkyūji: Dodge Danpei, there is an extra secret password, HEBE, that gives the player a menu to view all game cutscenes, including the ending.
- In the Shanghai series, the Hebereke characters made a cameo appearance in its mobile spin-off entry, Shanghai Musume: Mahjong Girls.
- The characters from Hebereke appeared as guest characters as downloadable content in the remake of Penguin Wars for the Nintendo Switch in 2017 in Japan.

== Merchandise ==
A sample of the Hebereke comic strip

=== Comic strip ===
Ryōji Uchimichi, the series' character designer, drew a yonkoma manga series based on the games that were serialized by Tokuma Shoten in the Japanese magazine Family Computer Magazine (also known as "Famimaga" for short) since September 6, 1991. On September 3, 1993, the strip had its title changed to Sugoi Hebereke (すごい へべれけ), which was eventually used for a fighting game for the Super Famicom. On September 30, 1995, the first two years' worth of strips were reprinted in a collection titled Hebereke no Hon, (Note: Japanese: へべれけのほん; lit. The Book of Hebereke) but the remaining strips were never republished. It was eventually christened Pemopemo (ぺもぺも) on April 21, 1997, before getting cancelled on March 20, 1998, following the discontinuation of Famimaga.

A yonkoma manga series based on the Hebereke games, titled Dai Eppyō, (Note: Japanese: だいえっぴょー; lit. Big Eppyō) was released on August 12, 2013, being published by Comic Market in Japan.

=== Original soundtrack ===
On June 25, 1994, a soundtrack titled Takusan Hebereke (Note: Japanese: たくさんへべれけ; lit. A Lot of Hebereke) was released, published by DATAM Polystar. It featured original versions of the music from the first three Hebereke games: Hebereke, Hebereke's Popoon and Sugoi Hebereke. It also includes those from another Sunsoft game, Gimmick! (known in Europe as Mr. Gimmick). The soundtrack was composed by Naoki Kodaka, Phaseout & Mutec, and Masashi Kageyama, and was arranged by Hitoshi Sakimoto.

== Characters ==
The Hebereke cast

The series sports characters and graphics that are typically Japanese cuteness in design, done in the style of Bomberman, The New Zealand Story, and particularly Hello Kitty.

The series primarily involves a cast of four main characters: Hebe, O-Chan, Sukezaemon, and Jennifer. It also involves four notable minor characters: Bobodori, Pen-Chan, Utsujin, and Unyohn.

=== Major characters ===
Hebe (sometimes referred to as "Hebereke", Bop-Louie in Ufouria)

Voiced by: Megumi Hayashibara

Hebe (へべ), known in Ufouria as Bop-Louie, is a small white albino penguin (a living snowman in Ufouria). He is seen wearing a blue knit cap with a white pom-pom in it. He is the fastest in terms of speed, but he doesn't jump as high, can't walk on ice, and also cannot swim. He could extend his neck to attack enemies using the Kubidokkan attack. He can also climb using a suction cup. He usually end his sentences with "pyō" (ぴょー). His first-person pronoun in Japanese is "wachi". (わち) (Note: This first-person pronoun is most likely made-up, as there's no other media character that uses it, not counting the ones that use わちし (wachishi), and it shouldn't be confused with わし (washi), with that first-person pronoun instead being used by characters of old age.)

O-Chan (Freeon-Leon in Ufouria)

Voiced by: Mika Kanai

O-Chan (おーちゃん, Ōchan), known in Ufouria as Freeon-Leon, is a little girl dressed with a cat suit (a male lizard in Ufouria). Unlike Hebe, she (Note: Female third-person pronouns would be used for consistency purposes, especially with her Hebereke series appearance.) is able to swim in water and safely walk on ice without slipping. She has a high-flying personality and has a high laugh. Her first-person pronoun in Japanese is "watakushi". (わたくし) (Note: Sometimes written as 私 (often pronounced as わたし, romanized as "watashi") and historically, 厶.)

Sukezaemon (Shades in Ufouria)

Voiced by: Norio Wakamoto

Sukezaemon (助左衛門(すけざえもん)), known in Ufouria as Shades, is a white ghost with black sunglasses and a red winged cap. With his light body, he can drift in the air for a long time. He also has a serious personality and is mostly polite. His first-person pronoun in Japanese is "sessha" (拙者(せっしゃ)).

Jennifer (Gil in Ufouria)

Voiced by: Shigeru Chiba

Jennifer (ヂェニファー(ぢぇにふぁー) (Note: Sometimes written as ジェニファー(じぇにふぁー)), Jenifā (Note: Also romanized as "Djenifā" due to romanization differences.)), known in Ufouria as Gil, is a green anglerfish with a yellow antenna. He's an underwater expert, being able to walk underwater. He speaks badly, but is kind-tempered. His first-person pronoun in Japanese is "oira" (オイラ(おいら)). (Note: It is also written as 己等, though that word might also be pronounced as おれら (orera), depending on the context it was used.) (Note: In Hashire Hebereke, he instead uses either "ore" (俺(おれ)) or "oresama" (俺様(おれさま)).)

=== Minor characters ===
Bobodori

Voiced by: Shigeru Chiba

Bobodori (ぼーぼーどり, Bōbōdori) is a male purple bird wearing a metal Helicopter Beanie. In the original Hebereke game, he helps Hebe by ferrying him across long gaps and rivers after he returns his inexplicably explosive egg. In Hebereke 2, he provides a fast travel service to transport Hebe between levels. His first-person pronoun in Japanese is "oira" (オイラ(おいら)). (Note: As was the case with Jennifer, it is also written as 己等, though that word might also be pronounced as おれら (orera), depending on the context it was used.) (Note: In the original Hebereke, he instead uses "ore" (俺(おれ)).)

Pen-Chan

Voiced by: Megumi Hayashibara

Pen-Chan (ぺんちゃん) is a little girl dressed with a penguin suit. She doesn't appear in the original game or its sequel. She doesn't have a first person pronoun in Japanese, instead using her name.

Utsujin

Voiced by: Norio Wakamoto

Utsujin (うつーじん, Utsūjin) is a male orange cat wearing an alien suit, being part of the Muu Cat Brothers clan; Unyohn's most elite minions. He usually starts his sentences with "muū" (むうー). He doesn't have a first person pronoun in Japanese, instead using Utsū (うつー), an abbreviation of his name.

Unyohn

Voiced by: Norio Wakamoto

Unyohn (うにょーん, Unyōn) is an alien wearing a helmet. He is the final boss of Hebereke and the main antagonist of the series. His color palette depends on the game. His first-person pronoun in Japanese is "washi" (わし). (Note: In Hashire Hebereke, he instead uses "oresama" (俺様(おれさま)).)
