= Journey to Silius =

1990 video game

- North American NES box art
- Developer: Sunsoft (Note: Developed under the shell corporation Tokai Engineering)
- Publisher: Sunsoft
- Programmers: Masahito Nomura; Hiroaki Higashiya; Masaaki Kitagawa
- Artist: Masashi Tsukada
- Composer: Naoki Kodaka
- Platform: Nintendo Entertainment System
- Release: EU: 1990; AU: 1990; JP: August 10, 1990; NA: September 1990
- Genre: Run and gun
- Mode: Single-player

Journey to Silius, known in Japan as Rough World (ラフ ワールド, Rafu Wārudo; stylized as [rʌf] WORLD), (Note: The other releases have "JOURNEY TO SILIUS" printed in the sound test menu, but the Japanese release has "ROUGH" ([rʌf]), and because of this, Rough World would be appropriate.) is a side-scrolling run and gun video game developed and published by Sunsoft for the Nintendo Entertainment System in 1990.

Journey to Silius was originally based on the 1984 film The Terminator, but the licensing rights to the film were lost during development. The graphics and storyline were altered to accommodate this change.

== Gameplay ==
Jay encounters the first enemy in the first stage of Journey to Silius.

The player controls Jay McCray, as he goes on a mission to defeat the terrorist group responsible for his father's death. There are five stages, consisting of the ruins of a space colony, an underground concourse, the enemy's hideout, a flying spaceship, and a factory. The player must fight his way through an assortment of robotic enemies and security systems in order to reach the end of each stage and fight the stage's boss.

The controls follow the standard conventions of other side-scrolling action games for the NES. The character can lie down, but he can only aim his gun left or right. In addition to the default handgun weapon, the player can switch to one of five additional weapons that can be procured throughout the course of the game - which are a shotgun, a machine gun, a homing gun, a laser rifle, and a grenade launcher. Each of these special weapons consumes the player's Gun Energy gauge and once it runs out, the player would automatically revert to the default handgun. The player can replenish Jay's health and ammo by retrieving energy capsules dropped by defeated enemies. After the fifth and final stage is completed, the credits are shown, and the player would restart the game on the first stage.

== Plot ==
In the year 373 of the new space age calendar, overpopulation of Earth has led to increased demand for emigration to space colonies. Jay McCray, the son of a scientist responsible for development of space colony #428 in the Silius Solar System (SSS), prepares to move there in order to follow in his father's footsteps, but the space station is obliterated in an explosion, killing the entire research team and destroying all data on board.

In his father's home, Jay discovers a floppy disk containing not only the complete SSS colony plans but a personal message from his father asking that he complete the projects should terrorists succeed in destroying the colony. To protect the colony plans and to avenge his father's death, Jay sets out to fight the terrorists responsible for the space colony's destruction.

== Development ==
Journey to Silius was originally conceived as a game based on the 1984 film The Terminator, but Sunsoft lost the license during development and as a result the plot and graphics were altered before release.

The American version was the first version of the game released and featured a design for the player character in which his face is exposed. For the later-released Japanese and European versions, the player character design was changed, having his whole body covered in armor.

The soundtrack was composed by Naoki Kodaka. Most NES composers would use the digital channel for sampled drums and the other channels for melodic content, but for Journey to Silius, Kodaka, with the programming assistance of Nobuyuki Hara, Shinichi Seya, and Naohisa Morota used the digital channel for a sampled bassline, and the triangle channel for a kick drum.

== Re-releases ==
Rough World was re-released in Japan in a two-in-one compilation for the PlayStation titled Memorial Series: Sunsoft Vol. 5, which also included Hebereke. The game was re-released on the Nintendo Switch through the Nintendo Classics service in December 2019.

== Reception ==
Reception

Review scores
Publication	Score
AllGame	3.5/5
Electronic Gaming Monthly	6/10, 6/10, 7/10, 6/10
GamePro	17/25
Micromanía	8/10
Nintendomagasinet	3/5
VideoGame	5/5

While the game itself never received wide acclaim in Western markets, the music has been widely praised.
