= Naoki Kodaka =

Japanese video game composer

Naoki Kodaka 小高 直樹
- Also known as: N-Kodaka
- Born: Japan
- Genres: Video game music, chiptune
- Occupation: Composer
- Instrument: Keyboards
- Years active: 1986–present
- Website: www.jcaa1970.com/arrangers/konsakka24.htm

Naoki Kodaka (小高 直樹, Kodaka Naoki) is a Japanese video game music composer who worked for Sunsoft. He is currently a professor of music at several universities and occasionally composes new music for special events.

Kodaka first learned to play piano during his early childhood but quit formal training at age 7, finding that he preferred to play popular music. He later resumed his classical studies in high school and would go on to major in composition at the Aichi Prefectural University of the Arts. Following his graduation, he briefly worked on producing music for radio and television. Among his classmates, Kodaka was known to spend much of his spare time in arcades, and this ultimately attracted Sunsoft to hire him as a video game composer.

He is best known for writing the soundtracks for Journey to Silius, Batman (NES, Genesis and Game Boy versions), Blaster Master, Gremlins 2: The New Batch, the Albert Odyssey series, Super Fantasy Zone, and a few other titles. He was almost always assisted on his NES projects by sound programmers Nobuyuki Hara, Shinichi Seya, and sometimes Naohisa Morota. Usually, Kodaka would compose songs on traditional sheet music, and the sound programmers would translate the compositions for the NES, sometimes receiving feedback from Kodaka on how the songs should sound. Kodaka retired from game music composition in 2002 and became a professor at Nagoya College of Music, where he teaches composition, arrangement, and production. At some later time, he also joined the faculty at Daido University, where he teaches music theory and computer-based music.

== Works ==
- Atlantis no Nazo (1986)
- Dead Zone (1986)
- The Wing of Madoola (1986)
- Nazoler Land (1987)
- Shanghai (1987)
- Spy Hunter (1987)
- Ripple Island (1988)
- Freedom Force (1988)
- Blaster Master (1988)
- Nankin no Adventure (1988)
- Platoon (1988)
- Fester's Quest (1989)
- Batman (1989)
- Batman: The Video Game (1990)
- Journey to Silius (1990)
- Nantettatte!! Baseball (1990)
- Gremlins 2: The New Batch (1990)
- Ufouria: The Saga (1991)
- Super Spy Hunter (1991)
- Batman: Return of the Joker (1991)
- Super Fantasy Zone (1992)
- Albert Odyssey (1993)
- Sugoi Hebereke (1994)
- Albert Odyssey II (1994)
- Albert Odyssey: Legend of Eldean (1996)
- Out Live: Be Eliminate Yesterday (1997)
