= Albert Odyssey (1993 video game) =

1993 roleplaying video game

- Official cover art of Albert Odyssey
- Developer: Sunsoft
- Publisher: Sunsoft
- Composer: Naoki Kodaka
- Series: Albert Odyssey
- Platforms: Super Famicom/SNES, Satellaview, Virtual Console
- Release: Super Famicom/SNES: JP: March 5, 1993; Satellaview: JP: March 29, 1998; Wii Virtual Console
- Genre: Tactical role-playing game
- Mode: Single-player

Albert Odyssey (アルバートオデッセイ, Arubāto Odessei) is a tactical role-playing video game developed and published by Sunsoft and released for the Super Nintendo Entertainment System in Japan in March 1993. The game features strategy-based combat in addition to traditional role-playing game elements in two-dimensional environments. It is the first game in the Albert Odyssey series, and was followed by two sequels, Albert Odyssey 2: Jashin no Taidō in 1994, and Albert Odyssey: Legend of Eldean in 1996. Albert Odyssey was made available as a full game download on the Satellaview add-on as BS Albert Odyssey (BSアルバートオデッセイ, BS Arubāto Odessei) on June 12, 1996, and the original Albert Odyssey was re-released for Satellaview in March 1998 the Wii Virtual Console in October 2010, and the Wii U Virtual Console in July 2015.

Players assume the role of Albert, the young heroic swordsman who lives in a fantasy world filled with monsters and mythical creatures. While much of the world remains in relative peace following a great war many years before, a military faction led by the dark magician Globus has emerged to conquer the newly pacified nations and expand their empire. With the help of Albert's friends as well as hired mercenaries, the player must travel the world and eventually confront Golbus and his forces to prevent another large-scale conflict.

== Gameplay ==
A typical battlefield scene

Albert Odyssey is a role-playing video game with strategy elements where players must travel through a fantasy environment battling monsters and other enemies to advance the story. The game uses two-dimensional character sprites and environments accompanied by the Super Nintendo Entertainment System's Mode 7 graphics capabilities that give the impression of three dimensions. Players move their characters from a top-down perspective through towns and other peaceful areas, while the game's overworld and dungeons are rendered as large battlefields laden with enemies. Throughout the game, players take part in the story by interacting with non-player characters and performing story-driven quests that continually expand the game's narrative.

Using a turn-based system, both the player and computer opponent take turns moving and attacking across the field. A player may choose to move, attack, perform magic, use an item in their possession to aid themselves, or retreat to the nearest safe area to rest or restock supplies. Once two characters come in contact with one another, a battle sequence ensues where the attacking character deals damage to the opponent, lowering their health. When the player or enemy's health reaches zero, they are defeated and ejected from the field. Player's advance by confronting and defeating enemies, gaining experience points in the process that go towards making characters stronger and learn new abilities. A character can be further augmented with progressively more powerful weapons and equipment can be purchased in towns or found on defeated enemies. Progress is recorded by using save points found in set areas throughout the game that utilize the Famicom's battery backup-up system. If all of a player's characters are defeated at any time, they are forced to restart the game from the last recorded save file.

== Audio ==
The music for Albert Odyssey was written and programmed by Sunsoft in-house composer Naoki Kodaka, with the game being his first Super Famicom and role-playing endeavor. In June 1993, Sunsoft released an official soundtrack titled All Sounds of Albert Odyssey in Japan published by Datam Polystar featuring all background music and jingles from the game. Later that year, selected music from Albert Odyssey was performed by the Tokyo City Philharmonic Orchestra as part of the third Game Music Concert series in Tokyo, Japan, later made available as a commercial album the following December. The two tracks represented were "The Road Walked by Heroes" and "Hometown Tibelis", retitled as "Albert Odyssey Theme" and "God's People" respectively.

== Sequel ==
Albert Odyssey 2: Jashin no Taidō
- Developer: Sunsoft
- Publisher: Sunsoft
- Composer: Naoki Kodaka
- Series: Albert Odyssey
- Platform: Super Famicom/SNES
- Release: Super Famicom/SNES: JP: December 22, 1994
- Genre: Tactical role-playing game
- Mode: Single-player

Albert Odyssey 2: Jashin no Taidō (アルバートオデッセイ2 邪神の胎動, Arubāto Odesei Tsu Jashin no Taidō; lit. Albert Odyssey 2: Sign of the Devil) is a tactical role-playing video game developed and published by Sunsoft for the Super Famicom and released in December 1994. It is the sequel to the original Albert Odyssey and retains many of the same gameplay and story elements while featuring enhanced graphics and battle features.

The game is set ten years after the previous title and follows the story of Dean, a young warrior who is enthralled by the exploits of the hero Albert who saved the world a decade earlier from an evil magician. Setting off on his own journey to investigate the conflict, Dean becomes entangled in an adventure of his own while meeting characters from the previous game. He soon learns that the world is once again in danger from an ancient evil god known as Okutoba, and must become a hero himself to stop him from throwing the world into darkness.

=== Gameplay ===
Like its predecessor, Albert Odyssey 2 is a traditional strategy-based role-playing video game featuring two-dimensional character and background graphics. While towns and other safe areas are presented in a top-down fashion where players can move about freely, the game's overworld and dungeons take the appearance of a grid-like strategy board filled with monsters and other enemies. Using the Super Famicom's Mode 7 graphics function, environments can scroll and zoom smoothly based on the player's point of view, and give the appearance of three-dimensions. Players advance the game's story by taking part in large-scale battles and interacting with non-player characters.

The battle system in Albert Odyssey 2 has been modified slightly from the original. While players can still move in eight directions to engage opponents, the size of many battlefields, as well as the number of enemies represented, has been reduced, with the entire system becoming more streamlined. Characters move about the battle environment using a turn-based system where enemies and the player's party take turns attacking in phases, with one entire side acting before another. On a player's turn, characters may move, fight, use a magic attack, use an item from their inventory, or retreat to a nearby safe location. Battle are won when an entire enemy party has been defeated, yielding experience points that allow characters to gain levels and become stronger as well as give access to new abilities. Players record their progress using the game cartridge's built-in battery back-up system by accessing preset save points during gameplay.
