= Batman (1989 video game) =

- Developer: Ocean Software
- Publisher: Ocean Software
- Programmers: Michael Lamb, John O'Brien, Allan Shortt (Amiga); Zach Townsend (C64); Paul Hughes, Michael Lamb (Atari ST)
- Artists: Dawn Drake, Bill Harbison, John Palmer, Robert Hemphill (Amiga & Atari ST); Andrew Sleigh (C64)
- Composers: Jonathan Dunn, Matthew Cannon (Amiga & Atari ST); Matthew Cannon (C64)
- Platforms: Amiga, Amstrad CPC, Atari ST, Commodore 64, MS-DOS, ZX Spectrum
- Release: 11 September 1989
- Genre: Action
- Mode: Single-player

Batman (also known as Batman: The Movie) is an action video game developed and published by Ocean Software based on the 1989 film of the same name. It was released on 11 September 1989 for the Commodore 64 and ZX Spectrum with Amiga, Amstrad CPC, Atari ST and MS-DOS versions following soon after.

== Gameplay ==
The game consists of five levels based on events from the film. Each stage has a time limit and a health gauge (represented by Batman's face turning into the Joker's), with Batman losing a life if he runs out of either. The levels have varying gameplay:

1. In the first level, styled as side-scrolling gameplay, Batman fights his way through the Axis Chemical Plant to confront Jack Napier, knocking him into a vat of chemicals and turning him into the Joker. Batman can use his Batarangs and grapple gun to defeat enemies. The grapple gun can also be used to climb to higher platforms and swing across gaps.
2. In the second level, Batman drives his Batmobile across Gotham City, dodging traffic and using a grapple to turn corners at high speed. Missing three consecutive turns causes Batman to run into a police roadblock and costs the player one life, regardless of the timer and health gauge.
3. The third level is a Mastermind-like puzzle set in the Batcave, in which Batman is presented with eight consumer products and must identify the three that the Joker has tainted with the deadly chemical Smilex. The player chooses three items at a time and is told how many are correct; a health penalty is incurred for selecting any incorrect items.
4. The fourth level takes place during the Joker's parade, in which Batman must fly the Batwing and cut away balloons filled with Smilex gas without crashing into them or the floats to which they are tethered.
5. In the fifth and final level, styled similarly to the first, Batman climbs to the top of Gotham City Cathedral and must stop the Joker from escaping on a helicopter.

== Release ==
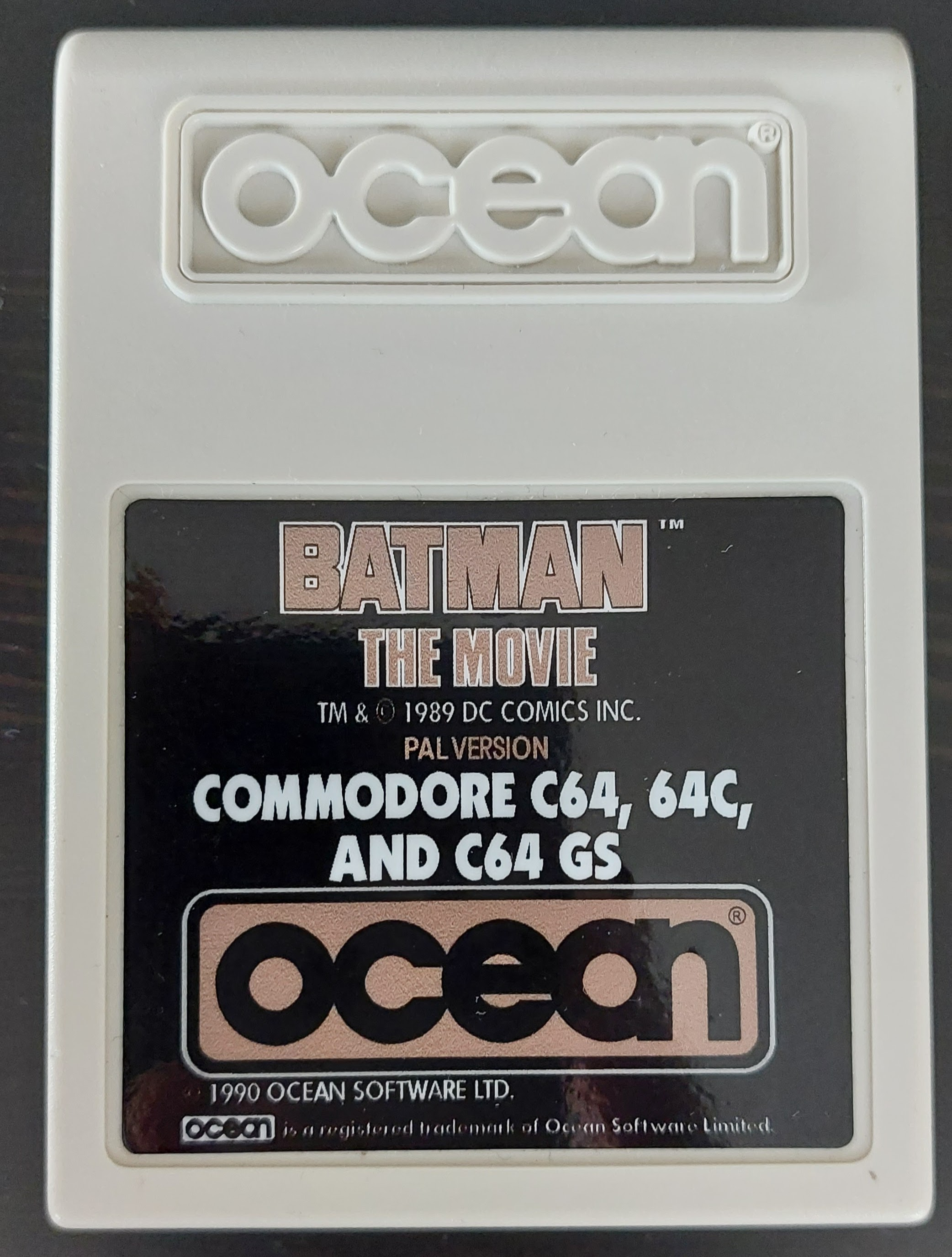
Cartridge game for the Commodore 64 of the game Batman The Movie developed by OCEAN

Commodore UK reached an agreement with Ocean Software to bundle the game with Amiga 500 computers. Between October 1989 and September 1990, A500 machines were sold in the United Kingdom in Batman-themed boxes containing the game and The NewZealand Story, as well as F/A-18 Interceptor and Deluxe Paint II, both contributed by Electronic Arts. With an initial commission of 10,000 units, a total of 186,000 were sold at the end of the run, making it the most successful Amiga bundle ever sold by Commodore.

== Reception ==
Reception

Award
Publication	Award
Crash	Smash

Batman received a host of awards, including Crash Smash, YS Megagame, SU Classic and C+VG Hit. The game was number 1 in the Spectrum charts for February 1990 and was awarded Game of the Year in Crash magazine. Computer Gaming World recommended the Amiga version to action fans, but reported that the Commodore 64 version was too buggy, but was well received by Commodore Format magazine and was seen as one of the best movie tie-in games released for the platform.
