= Ganbare Goemon: Sarawareta Ebisumaru! =

1991 video game

- Original Japanese cover art
- Developer: Konami
- Publisher: Konami
- Designer: Satoru Okada
- Composers: Akihiro Juuichiya; Shinji Tasaka; Yoshiyuki Hagiwara
- Series: Ganbare Goemon
- Platform: Game Boy
- Release: Game Boy: JP: December 25, 1991
- Genre: Platformer
- Mode: Single-player

Ganbare Goemon: Sarawareta Ebisumaru! (がんばれゴエモン さらわれたエビス丸; "Persevere Goemon: Kidnapped Ebisumaru!") is a platform video game released by Konami for the Game Boy in 1991. The first game in the Ganbare Goemon series ever released for a portable system, it is the sixth mainline installment overall. Gameplay is similar to Ganbare Goemon! Karakuri Dōchū which was released on the Famicom. Only Goemon is playable, and the game consists of him rescuing Ebisumaru; Sasuke and Yae do not make appearances.

== Release history ==
The game was originally only released in Japan. In 1997, Konami started releasing the Konami GB Collection, a collection of four older Konami games re-released with a Super Game Boy color palette and borders added. Goemon was released in Volume 2 in Japan. In 2000, they were again updated for the Game Boy Color, translated, and released in Europe. For the European release, the order of the games was altered to what was Vol. 4 in Japan, which became Vol. 2, while the Japanese Vol. 2 and 3 became Vol. 3 and 4 respectively. For the European port the title screen was changed to Mystical Ninja Starring Goemon, and just "Starring Goemon" on the game select screen since the most recent Goemon games released in Europe were Mystical Ninja Starring Goemon and Mystical Ninja 2 Starring Goemon. The original Game Boy version of the game was released on the 3DS Virtual Console in Japan on June 27, 2012. The game was re-released in 2026 via the Ganbare Goemon! Daishūgō compilation.
