= Ganbare Goemon: Ōedo Daikaiten =

2001 video game

Ganbare Goemon Ōedo Daikaiten
- Developer(s): Konami Computer Entertainment Kobe; Now Production
- Publisher(s): Konami
- Director(s): Masami Shimotsuma; Hideki Tomida
- Producer(s): Keita Kawaminami; Etsunobu Ebisu
- Designer(s): Daigo Kawashima; Kunihiko Niwa; Atsushi Nakanishi
- Composer(s): Kaori Idaya; Nobuhiro Ouchi
- Series: Ganbare Goemon
- Platform(s): PlayStation
- Release: JP: March 29, 2001; JP: December 12, 2002 (PSone Books)
- Genre(s): Action-adventure
- Mode(s): Single-player, multiplayer

Ganbare Goemon: Ōedo Daikaiten (がんばれゴエモン〜大江戸大回転〜||lit. "Oedo Large Rotation") is the nineteenth Ganbare Goemon game, released for the PlayStation on March 29, 2001.

A villain named Ecorori kidnaps Omitsu, and is up to Goemon and his crew to stop him.

The game is similar to Ganbare Goemon 2 for Super Famicom and Goemon's Great Adventure in that there's mostly side-scrolling levels, accompanied by some Impact bosses and all of its music and sound effects are recycled from the previous games like Mystical Ninja Starring Goemon, Goemon's Great Adventure and Mononoke Suguroku. Unlike previous Goemon games, which have used sprites or 3-D models for the characters, the characters are now represented by pre-rendered CGI, giving them a quasi-3-D look. Also, Yae is featured in her outfit that first appeared in Goemon Mononoke Sugoroku.
