= Goemon's Great Adventure =

1998 video game

- North American box art
- Developer: Konami Computer Entertainment Osaka
- Publisher: Konami
- Director: Tomoharu Okutani
- Producer: Kazuhiko Uehara
- Designer: Madoka Yamauchi
- Programmer: Koichi Yagi
- Writer: Madoka Yamauchi
- Composers: Shigeru Araki; Yasumasa Kitagawa; Hirotaka Kurita; Yusuke Kato; Nobuyuki Akena
- Series: Ganbare Goemon
- Platform: Nintendo 64
- Release: JP: December 23, 1998; EU: June 18, 1999; NA: September 15, 1999
- Genre: Platforming
- Modes: Single-player, multiplayer

Goemon's Great Adventure, (Note: Japanese: がんばれゴエモン～でろでろ道中(どうちゅう) オバケてんこ盛(も)り～, Hepburn: Ganbare Goemon Derodero Dōchū Obake Tenko Mori) known as Mystical Ninja 2 Starring Goemon in Europe, is a video game developed and released by Konami for the Nintendo 64 on December 23, 1998. It is the fourth game in the Ganbare Goemon series released in North America and Europe, as well as the fourteenth and latest overall mainline installment, following Mystical Ninja Starring Goemon, released two years earlier. Featuring platform gameplay in 2.5D, it returns the series to a side-scrolling format.

The story highlights Goemon's quest to stop the evil Bismaru, who has stolen Wise Man's resurrection machine. Goemon and his friends must journey through five worlds to battle the revived Dochuki, prince of the underworld, and destroy the captured device. Each world is designed with Japanese styles and themes, and Goemon's Great Adventure continues the series' tradition of offbeat, surreal humor.

The game sold more than 160,000 copies worldwide. Reminiscent of older, 16-bit games, the side-scrolling system was lauded by reviewers, who also praised the two-player cooperative mode. The game's graphics and musical score earned high marks as well. Reviewers have considered it one of the best side-scrollers for the Nintendo 64.

== Gameplay ==
The protagonist Goemon moving horizontally through a three-dimensional landscape

Goemon's Great Adventure is a side scrolling platform game in which players navigate stages. Gameplay in Great Adventure more closely resembles that of the Ganbare Goemon series' Super Famicom entries, and abandons the free-roaming style of Mystical Ninja Starring Goemon. Although movement is restricted along a two-dimensional plane, the stages are rendered in three dimensions and frequently wind along the z coordinate—earning the game a 2.5D status similar to Yoshi's Story, Klonoa: Door to Phantomile, and the Super Smash Bros. series. The game begins on a world map upon which several circles are placed indicating stages. Players must complete certain stages to open up paths to others, and each world map generally features one town and one dungeon. Completing a dungeon allows travel to a new world map, but the player must collect several entry passes to gain access to these structures. Passes are rewarded for completing stages and performing tasks for non-player characters in cities. Though the game is linear like its 16-bit predecessors, certain non-linear elements exist—such as a secret village and multiple paths through a world map.

Goemon's Great Adventure takes place in a fantastical version of Edo period Japan, featuring forests, mountains, dwellings, and underworlds designed with Japanese themes and a touch of science fiction. Individual stages are populated by monsters, obstacles, items (such as Ryō currency or dumplings), and occasionally bosses, who are stronger than most enemies. Players can run, jump, attack with weapons, and use various special abilities to reach the end of levels and gain entry passes. Four characters with three uniforms are available for play, including Goemon, Ebisumaru, Sasuke, and Yae. Characters can be changed in cities or in stages through portals to an interdimensional teahouse. Two players can play the game simultaneously, though they must both be visible on screen—one player cannot advance if the other runs in a different direction. In each stage, a bar at the bottom of the screen displays information concerning character health, weapon equipped, lives remaining, and time of day. If a character is touched or attacked by a monster, a health bar is reduced from a total of three. If all bars disappear, the player loses a life and must restart the stage. The game ends if all lives are lost, at which point it reverts to the beginning or the last point at which the player saved his or her progress with a Controller Pak. Defeated monsters sometimes leave behind dumplings and Maneki Neko—the former replenishes health, and the latter upgrades weapons up to two levels above starting strength.

Goemon's Great Adventure features a system of day and night. Every two to three minutes, a meter in the information bar will slowly turn to evening or morning; the sky in a stage's background will similarly emulate the hues of a sunset or a sunrise. At night, more powerful and swift enemies challenge players. However, they produce two Ryō coins rather than one when killed. Different non-playable characters can be found at night in towns as well. Within these cities, players can purchase armor (represented by three blue bars), sleep in inns and eat in restaurants to recover strength, and perform miniature quests for entry passes. For example, the character Sasuke must help a man in Spook Village set off fireworks for a festival. Scripted events relating to the game's storyline also take place in dwellings, and occur elsewhere before characters assault dungeons or after these special stages have been completed. The successful infiltration of a dungeon often leads to a battle between three giant mecha robots. These conflicts pitch the player, controlling the robots Impact and Lady Impact, against a villain and his or her robot of choice. From the perspective of a cockpit behind Impact's eyes, players can punch, kick, grab, or fire nasal and beam weaponry at an enemy robot. Measures of health, enemy health, and ammunition are displayed in the cockpit. If the player's robot runs out of health, the game restarts at the beginning of the battle. To avoid this scenario, players can throw a baton to the other friendly robot; if it hits its mark, player perspective changes to the new robot who has his or her own health count. In two-player mode, one player waits while the other fights, and comes into play if the baton is passed. The penultimate conflict in the game is an Impact battle, and after winning a final fight in the normal side-scrolling mode the player can witness the ending of the game.

== Plot ==
=== Characters ===
The protagonist of Goemon's Great Adventure is Goemon, a ninja with blue, bushy hair who wields a kiseru. Goemon can jump higher than his friends, throw money, and use a chain pipe. His friends are Ebisumaru, Yae, and Sasuke. Ebisumaru is a fat man with a blue bandana and a love of food. Idolizing James Dean as the ultimate ninja, he can attack enemies with a decorative paddle, a magic megaphone that causes his shouts to turn to stone, and stomach gas. Yae is a green-haired female ninja, or kunoichi, wielding a Katana. She has the ability to morph into a mermaid in order to swim underwater and use a bazooka. Finally, Sasuke is a fast mechanical ninja who has upgradable projectile attacks such as shuriken and bombs. The villains of Goemon's Great Adventure are Bismaru and Dochuki. Bismaru, a cross-dressing nun (who first appeared in Ganbare Goemon 3), steals Wise Man's resurrection machine to revive Dochuki, an ancient prince of the underworld. While Bismaru fights with his giant robot, Dochuki confronts the party in person.

Neutral characters include the Wise Man, Omitsu, Edo's Lord, Princess Yuki, and a young cat girl named Suzaku, who assists Goemon and his friends with information. For battles with large foes, characters pilot the giant robots Impact and Miss Impact, created by the Wise Man to resemble Goemon and Omitsu. Finally, in every town, starting at Ryo, there is a fortune teller called Plasma. He gives the player hints as to the location of every entry pass in the area.

=== Story ===
Goemon and his friends must stop Ebisumaru's descendant Bismaru, who plans to use one of the Old Wise Man's inventions in order to unleash another disaster. Specifically, the Old Wise Man (who has appeared in every game in the series) has created a "ghost return machine" that can bring the dead back to life. Bismaru is attempting to create an army of undead creatures for her master, Dochuki, the master of the underworld. Enemies like ghosts, skeletons, and creatures from Japanese folklore have been unleashed and must be stopped.

Goemon and Ebisumaru then, will travel around five different worlds, starting from Edo. In the local town, "Lost'n Town", Sasuke will join them. Later they will reach the Edo Castle, where they will try to save Omitsu, the King and his daughter from the robot Impact, himself. As they realize Impact was hypnotized by Bismaru, the princess of Edo reveals that Bismaru was attempting to reach some island.

Eventually, Goemon and allies reach Tortoise Island and find their final partner, Yae, who provides Sasuke with a "diving device". The team follows Bismaru to the second castle, which contains several underwater levels. After defeating Bismaru's robot, Bismaru turns to disappear again.

A new neutral character appears, a mysterious female ghost named Susaku, who tells Goemon where Bismaru escaped: Mafu Island, an island full of undead, creepy ghost creatures in middle of the lava. In the local town, Goemon meets the Wise Man again, who reveals Bismaru's plan of returning the evil king Dochuki to the human world again. The gang must head to the third castle just to realize that it's too late, and Dochuki is already alive.

Goemon and his friends manage to get to the Underworld, where undead and ghost creatures reside, and destroy Wise Man's Machine in the Underworld Castle. Unable to stop Bismaru again, Susaku appears to give Goemon directions. This time, the scenario takes places in a Floating Island in the sky. Susaku also gives Goemon a container to catch Dochuki's soul.

The final castle, "Dream Castle", is a combination of the four previous castles, where the gang will find Susaku kidnapped by Dochuki, threatening to kill her if they don't give him the container. Goemon does so, having no option, and Dochuki breaks it with his hands.

Impact and Dochuki's evil ghost-robot get into a fight. Eventually, Impact wins, and what appears to be the final encounter is a fight between Dochuki and Goemon. After being defeated, Dochuki shows his real form, a giant wolf which spits poisonous gas.

Dochuki is beaten and tries to escapes, as there is no container to catch him, but Ebisumaru "farts" and kills Dochuki's spirit, as Ebisumaru's gas mixed with the spirit.

After the game is completed, Wise Man calls Goemon's gang to thank and tell them that he invented a new and more powerful machine to resurrect the dead, again. Suddenly, a baby appears from nowhere, and Ebisumaru claims that it's from him. Bismaru appears and tries to kidnap the new ghost return machine again, but the baby accidentally presses the machine's self-destruct button.

As in previous Ganbare Goemon games, the plot is wacky and lighthearted. Nintendo wrote that Goemon seems "at ease roaming a medieval Japan bustling with robots, DJs, space ships and extra-hold mousse".

== Promotion ==
Konami heavily promoted the Ganbare Goemon series for the Christmas season of 1998, as three games were due to be released—Goemon's Great Adventure and the PlayStation release Ganbare Goemon: Kuru Nara Koi! Ayashige Ikka no Kuroi Kage would premiere on December 23, 1998, and Ganbare Goemon: Tengu-tou no Gyakushuu! for the Game Boy Color would enter the market on January 14, 1999. Great Adventure and its PlayStation counterpart were both shown to fans at the 1998 Tokyo Game Show, where children flocked to play them. News of an English translation and North American release was first provided by a Konami employee in September 1998, and the finished game appeared at the 1999 Electronic Entertainment Expo, though without the theme song sequence. It was originally slated to be named Mystical Ninja: Goemon 2 in North America; this title was kept in some form for the PAL release, entitled Mystical Ninja 2: Starring Goemon. To generate interest and incentive for the North American release, Konami included $20 rebates for Goemon's Great Adventure or Castlevania 64 in copies of Hybrid Heaven.

== Audio ==
"Without Relying on the Map"
Two thirty-second samples, one featured in day and one in night, of Creep Village's music. The instrumentation and arrangement changes to a soft sound in night, and features dogs howling, crickets chirping, sleepers snoring, and other evening ambience.

"Palace of the Sea Goddess, Life on Turtle"
Two thirty-second samples of the music of the second dungeon, representative of the soundtrack's integration of modern and traditional instruments and musical transition as the player progresses through a dungeon.

Goemon's Great Adventure continues its predecessor's musical style by integrating modern synthesizers and traditional Japanese instruments. The game features two musical numbers: "SMILE AGAIN", a rock theme song, and "DOUBLE IMPACT", an updated version of "I Am Impact" from Mystical Ninja Starring Goemon. Two performers from that game returned for its sequel; Ichirou Mizuki voiced "I Am Impact"'s music with Sakura Tange and Hironobu Kageyama sang Great Adventure's theme song. These performances were inexplicably cut from the North American and European releases of the game, leaving the title screen silent and eliminating the Impact battle preparation sequence. Japanese voice acting in the opening and ending scenes was left in. A team of five composers created the game's main soundtrack, each personally writing several demos and arranging finished pieces. The music of nearly all stages changes in response to the day and night system of gameplay. In normal stages, at night a stage's unique theme slows down and segues into a night theme particular to all levels in a world map. As morning approaches, the evening song fades as the stage's normal theme resumes. In settlements, night themes maintain the arrangement of the day theme, albeit with softer tones and instruments. Music also changes within dungeons, usually becoming faster-paced as players advance. One composer regretted that the space limitations of a compact disc would preclude the appearance of night themes on an official release, and stated that timing the musical changes for the system was a difficult process. Yet another spoke on the style of Ganbare Goemon music:

And thanks to this project, I've come down with the Goemon syndrome—the disease most dreaded by composers wherein all the songs one writes are Japanese-style.

— Nobuyuki Akena

A few songs from earlier titles appear, including Bismaru's theme and the ending music introduced in Ganbare Goemon Kirakira Dōchū: Boku ga Dancer ni Natta Wake. A composer who grew up as a fan of Konami's game integrated rhythms reminiscent of beatmania's catalogue in a few songs. A 68-track soundtrack was released by Konami on January 22, 1999.

== Critical reception ==
Reception

Review score
Publication	Score
IGN	8/10

Goemon's Great Adventure sold over 160,000 copies worldwide and received favorable reviews, earning an 8 out of 10 at IGN, an A at 1UP.com, a 3.5 out of 5 at GamePro, and a metascore of 80% at GameRankings. Critics enjoyed the "simple, yet enjoyable platform gameplay", specifically citing Castlevania overtones and fresh, varied level design as strong points. The 2.5D system received much fanfare; GamePro stated that it made the game "more exciting than any old 2D scrollers." Nintendo noted that the game looks "more realistic than any 16-bit platformer, but...plays just like one". The presence of a cooperative mode for two players was considered a huge improvement over the game's predecessor, and brought back memories of "classic Nintendo and Konami sidescrollers." David Canter of The San Diego Union-Tribune said the "ability to control four diverse characters gives the game a nice touch of variety". The camera issues found in Mystical Ninja Starring Goemon were solved by the switch to the side-scrolling genre. Peer Schneider of IGN celebrated the game's non-linear puzzle elements and quests, which made the game require more than a day to complete. GamePro noted that these quests still took place in completed stages, lending little added appeal. While Nintendo Power applauded the precise play control, GamePro argued that it could have been slackened somewhat. Canter countered, "control is responsive. A good thing, too, as Goemon's Great Adventure quickly becomes challenging... The only problem with control occurs when playing as the mermaid...maneuvering a beached whale might be easier." Great Adventure's graphics impressed critics. Schneider wrote that they seemed "right out of a Kurosawa movie, complete with both Buddhist and Shinto architecture, temples, shrines, tombstones, cogs, mills, giant frogs, statues and more". Nintendo lauded the special effects, including "artfully composed cinema sequences...backdrops of glimmering water...and...translucent spirits". Canter agreed that while they "don't set a new standard, but there are some nice visual touches". GamePro and IGN agreed that enemy design was generally less impressive, excepting the boss characters and Impact robots. David Canter disagreed, citing "castle bosses, such as the screen-filling skeleton" as "especially eye-pleasing".

Several reviewers reiterated concerns over the previous game that the overt Japanese setting and humor might alienate North American fans. One reviewer suggested the game for fans "capable of overlooking some of the games' more inscrutable cultural references." Nintendo Power wrote that "the story is a weird mix of sci-fi, Japanese culture and superheroes, but it seems perfectly suited to the game...full of action and variety." Levi Buchanan, one of the magazine's reviewers, asserted that the game "radiates personality", while GamePro centered its opinion of the game as very quirky. IGN echoed these sentiments, stating that the plot seemed "completely nuts...[yet] somehow fits together to make a highly entertaining and original game." The soundtrack—"always a Konami hallmark"—was received well, with critics identifying "that peculiar mix of synthesizer music and old-fashioned shamisen, koto and drum music". Nintendo specifically praised "subtle transitions from day to night and back again." Schneider also singled out the Underworld dungeon's theme for praise, remarking that it suited the Castlevania style of the stage well. The sound effects of the game mirrored ones used in 16-bit Ganbare Goemon games, although increased in sampling rate and variety.

IGN's Schneider remarked that Goemon's Great Adventure would have benefitted from more role-playing game elements as exemplified in Ganbare Goemon 3: Shishijūrokubē no Karakuri Manji Gatame. He also regretted that the miniature games (Gradius, among others) found in earlier games were absent. Jason Leung of Nintendo Power wrote, "finally, a sidescroller done right for the N64". David Canter concluded,

All in all, this title is a solid, challenging 2-D action/platform game for a system that is woefully short on the genre... Challenging game play, above average visuals and a humorous Far Eastern-flavored story line and laugh-out-loud funny character conversations (and the strangest game continue screen to date), make this game the best 2-D platform game for Nintendo.

IGN summarized, "two-player co-op, 2D gameplay with 3D graphics, and excellent music make this a much better game than the first N64 Mystical Ninja installment." GamePro's conclusion was less favorable, stating that "Goemon's Great Adventure is a bit of a let down...a good attempt at an old-school 2D platformer, but...falls short in many ways." Nintendo's online review concluded that "Great Adventure is an excellent example of how fun good ol' platformers can be."

Next Generation reviewed the Nintendo 64 version of the game, rating it three stars out of five, and stated that "Goemon's Great Adventure emerges as a much better game than its predecessor - and, like the Crash Bandicoot series, shows that not every game needs to be in full 3D to be fun."

== Sequels ==
As of 2012, Goemon's Great Adventure is the last Ganbare Goemon game to date that has been translated to English and released overseas. The next and final Goemon game for the Nintendo 64 is Goemon Mononoke Sugoroku, released exclusively in Japan on December 25, 1999. In Mononoke Sugoroku, players must collect Ofuda cards while navigating a board game. Konami followed with Bouken Jidai Katsugeki Goemon, a game for the PlayStation 2 released on December 21, 2000, and other PlayStation games in 2001. The now-defunct company Working Designs attempted to bring Bouken Jidai Katsugeki to English audiences as Mystical Ninja Goemon beginning in May, 2002. Motivated to promote a series "that's never quite received the recognition it deserves here [in the United States]", Working Designs demonstrated the game in its booth at E3 a month later. Mystical Ninja Goemon remained on the studio's release list until its closing in 2005; it is rumored that Sony canceled the game's release due to subpar graphics. While Goemon ceased to appear on home consoles in 2001, Konami continued to release handheld games, and experimented with the series formula by revising Goemon's appearance, using futuristic settings, and employing a more serious tone. The medieval, quirky, Japanese themes were revived on June 23, 2005 with Ganbare Goemon: Tōkai Dōchū Ōedo Tengu ri Kaeshi no Maki for the Nintendo DS.
