= Jun'ichi Sugawara =

Japanese voice actor (born 1959)

- 菅原 淳一
- Born: March 27, 1959 (age 67); Miyagi Prefecture, Japan
- Occupation: Voice actor
- Years active: 1982–present
- Agent: Production Baobab

Jun'ichi Sugawara (菅原 淳一, Sugawara Jun'ichi; born March 27, 1959) is a Japanese voice actor.

== Filmography ==
=== Anime ===
List of voice performances in anime
Year	Title	Role	Notes	Source
1982	Maya the Honey Bee	Heppiri insect, frog	1982 TV series	
1984	Yoroshiku Mechadock ja:よろしくメカドック	Mizuki, Nagasawa		
1985	Musashi no Ken	Iwao Oishi		
1986	Uchūsen Sagittarius	05, Kamil		
1986	Mobile Suit Gundam ZZ	Dale, Dana Kirai, Ero Meroe		
1986	The Wonderful Wizard of Oz	Field mouse		
1987	Esper Mami	Atsushi		
1987	Mister Ajikko	Chef plum		
1987	The Samurai ja:ザ・サムライ	Schoolboy	OVA	
1989	Yawara! A Fashionable Judo Girl	Yasui		
1989	The Laughing Salesman	Shinichi Tsutsui, Hitori Tsunejin		
1990	Kyatto Ninden Teyandee	Gozaimasu No. 7		
1990	NG Knight Ramune & 40	Silicone		
1990	RPG Densetsu Hepoi ja:RPG伝説ヘポイ	Brikin the 3rd, Don Blue, St. Castle		
1990	Tasuke, the Samurai Cop	Kuro zukin 2-gō 黒頭巾2号		
1991	Jankenman	Squares ウータン		
1991	21 Emon ja:21エモン	Papa (boyhood)		
1991	Genji Tsūshin Agedama	Principal, Heikegani husband 平家かに夫		
1991	Yokoyama Mitsuteru Sangokushi	Ji Ling		
1991	Dragon Knight	Lizardman	OVA	
1992	Salad jūyūshi tomato man ja:サラダ十勇士トマトマン	Pumpkin uncle, Makufuurikku		
1992	Papuwa	Dan-chan		
1992–1994	Tokyo Babylon series	Staff	2 OVAs	
1992	Devil Hunter Yohko	Yamada	OVA ep. 2	
1993	The Brave Express Might Gaine	Security guard		
1993	Nintama Rantaro	Kaminarioni, others		
1993	The Laughing Salesman: Year-end drinking party 笑ゥせぇるすまん年忘れ特大号	Warabe Dai Yumeno 夢野童太	TV special	
1994	G Gundam	Gara Gara		
1994	Haō Taikei Ryū Knight	Girura		
1994	The Legend of Snow White	Gurume		
1994	Metal Fighter Miku	Kajiwara		
1995	Jura Tripper	Gatekeeper length		
1995	Wild Knights Gulkeeva	Gentle		
1995	Mobile Suit Gundam Wing	Sedici		
1995	Soar High! Isami	Tsunekichi		
1995	Mojacko	Vice-principal, Mon Taro, Shogun Otakara		
1995	Neon Genesis Evangelion	Various characters		
1995	Zukkokesan'ningumi Kusunoki yashiki no guruguru-sama ja:ズッコケ三人組 楠屋敷のグルグル様	Driver		
1996	Ganbarist! Shun	Yasunori Saga, others		
1996	Hurricane Polymar	Delivery person	OVA	
1996	Martian Successor Nadesico	Saizou		
1997	Anime Ganbare Goemon	Hundred feature knowledge via, investigation section chief 百地物知介, 捜査課長		
1998	Ginga Hyōryū Vifam 13	Staff		
1998	Fancy Lala	Akiru's father		
1998	Nessa no hao Gandara ja:熱沙の覇王ガンダーラ	Doghan, Gail		
1998	Gasaraki	Nozomi Takayama		
1998	Popolocrois	Chancellor Morm		
1998	Only You Viva! Cabaret ja:Only You ビバ!キャバクラ	Amigo threesome 1 bald アミーゴ三人組1ハゲ		
1998	Getter Robo Armageddon	Pilot	OVA ep. 3	
1999	Cyborg Kuro-chan	Jisan, Shogun (brother)		
1999	Infinite Ryvius	Son Doppo, Marco Brawl		
1999	Karakurizōshi Ayatsuri Sakon	Uncle / custodian		
1999	Weekly Story Land	Various characters		
2000	Brigadoon	Neil		
2000	Shin Megami Tensei: Devil Children	Doppelganger		
2000	Hiwou War Chronicles	Rokuzou		
2001	Mōtto! Ojamajo Doremi	Kotaro Okajima's grandfather		
2001	Z.O.E. Dolores, I	Bar Master		
2001	PaRappa the Rapper	A Look-alike		
2001	s-CRY-ed	Mucho Hattori		
2001	Kirby: Right Back at Ya!	Cook Oosaka, Popon		
2002	Digimon Frontier	Manager of Bagamon		
2002	Mao-chan	Prime minister		
2002	Mobile Suit Gundam SEED	Captain Zelman		
2003	Ashita no Nadja	Vienna police chief		
2003	Kaleido Star series	Jean Benigni	Also New Wings	
2003	The World of Narue	Tadashi Nanase		
2003	Zatch Bell!	Village headman		
2003	Texhnolyze	Shopkeeper		
2003	Rumic Theater	逆髪衆, 若いおとう		
2003	Gilgamesh	Chef		
2003	Twin Spica	Shiomi		
2004	Sgt. Frog	Joriri, Kyokupuro Alien		
2004	Samurai Champloo	Referee		
2004	Black Jack	Genkichi		
2005	Pretty Cure Max Heart	Sumo staff		
2005	Speed Grapher	Various characters		
2005	Gun Sword	Various characters		
2005	Angel Heart	Senior police officer, police officer		
2005	Hell Girl	Head teacher		
2006	Inukami!	Kabira house		
2006	Fushigiboshi no FutagoHime Gyu!	Ban Jo		
2006	Black Jack 21	Nylon, Kreutzer, Clark		
2006	Code Geass: Lelouch of the Rebellion	Various characters		
2006	History's Strongest Disciple Kenichi	Kondo		
2007	Koi suru Tenshi Angelique ~ Kagayaki no Ashita ~	Mayor		
2007	Naruto Shippuden	A goblin cat		
2007	Darker Than Black	Father of friend		
2008	Persona Trinity Soul	Nakamura		
2008	Hakken Taiken Daisuki! Shimajirō	Leonardo teacher		
2008	Chrysanthemum-chan and the Wolf ja:キクちゃんとオオカミ	Hashimoto		
2009	Sora no Manimani	Yamada		
2009	Your siblings story ja:ご姉弟物語	Machida's father, Kihei son, Sanchu son 町田の父, 喜平の息子, 山中の息子, 主催者の声		
2012	Kuromajo-san ga Toru!!	Banshee		
2013	Sasami-san@Ganbaranai	Teacher, Kibamaru		
2014	The World Is Still Beautiful	Peasant		
2022	Shenmue	Yamagishi, Yunshen Yuan		
	Case Closed	Various characters	Ep. 219-259	
	All Purpose Cultural Cat Girl Nuku Nuku	Man 2	OVA phase VI	
1999	Seraphim Call	Policeman	Ep. 2	
1992–93	Ys II	Rupa	OAV	

=== Film ===
List of voice performances in film
Year	Title	Role	Notes	Source
1985	Doraemon: Nobita's Little Star Wars	Freedom alliance members		
1993	Ninja Scroll	Shinkuro		
1994	Umeboshidenka uchūnohate kara panparopan! ウメ星デンカ 宇宙の果てからパンパロパン！	Fuguta		
1994	Pom Poko	Other raccoon dog		
1996	Doraemon: Nobita and the Galaxy Super-express	Don		
1997	Elmer's Adventure: My Father's Dragon	Rachel		
2000	Doraemon: Nobita and the Legend of the Sun King	Soldier		
2001	Doraemon: Nobita and the Winged Braves	Crow Guard		
2001	Case Closed: Countdown to Heaven	Hajime Tsukamoto		
2001	Cowboy Bebop: Knockin' on Heaven's Door	Robber B		
2001	Siamese cat: First Mission シャム猫 -ファーストミッション-	politician		
2002	Crayon Shin-chan: The Storm Called: The Battle of the Warring States	Gun head		
2003	Pa-Pa-Pa the Movie: Perman	TV director		
2003	Detective Conan: Crossroad in the Ancient Capital	Station staff of Kurama Station		
2005	Black Jack: The Two Doctors of Darkness	Emergency personnel		
2007	Doraemon: Nobita's New Great Adventure into the Underworld	doctor		
2008	Doraemon: Nobita and the Green Giant Legend	Mountain of father		
2010	Crayon Shin-chan: Super-Dimension! The Storm Called My Bride	Shopkeeper		
2011	Doraemon: Nobita and the New Steel Troops—Winged Angels	Aristocracy robot		

=== Video games ===
List of voice performances in video games
Year	Title	Role	Notes	Source
1995	Far East of Eden: Kabuki Klash	Narrator, White		
1995	Metal Fighter Miku	Kajiwara reporter	SS	
1998	ja:季節を抱きしめて	Cop, Cafe manager	PS1/PS2	
1998	Ganbare Goemon: Kuru Nara Koi! Ayashige Ikka no Kuroi Kage	Wise old man	PS1/PS2	
2000	Brigandine Grand Edition	People of Paraduru / Burussamu / Boarute / Clarence of town	PS1/PS2	
2000	Kamen Rider V3	Scissors Jaguar	PS1/PS2	
2000	Bōken Jidai Katsugeki Goemon	Know-it-all old man / Xuanwu	PS1/PS2	
2002	Tales of Destiny 2	Gap	PS1/PS2	
2004	Doraemon: Nobita in the Wan-Nyan Spacetime Odyssey	Aide	Other	
2005	The Mythical Detective Loki Ragnarok: Magic 妖画-lost smile ~	Master	PS1/PS2	
2009	Zettai Zetsumei Toshi 3: Kowareyuku Machi to Kanojo no Uta	Yoichi Ishizawa	PSP	
2009	Super Robot Wars NEO	Shirukon	Wii	
2013	Super Robot Wars Operation Extend	Shirukon	PSP	
	Tales of Rebirth	Tomichi		
	SD Gundam Generation Spirits	Dell, Novotni デル、ノヴォトニー		

=== Dubbing ===
List of voice performances in dubbing
Title	Role	Notes	Source
Tiny Toon Adventures	Hamton Pig		
Babylon 5	Dicar Ambassador ジ・カー大使		
C-16	Prichett プリチェット		
Pirates of the Caribbean: Dead Man's Chest	Cock コック		
Courage the Cowardly Dog	Courage		
West Side Story	Snowboy	1990 TBS edition	
