= Kôzô Nakamura =

Japanese composer

Kôzô Nakamura (中村 康三, Nakamura Kōzō, not to be confused with the other Konami composer Keizo Nakamura) is a video game composer who worked for Konami. During the late 1980s to the early 1990s, he was a member of the Konami Kukeiha Club and worked as composer and sound designer on various arcade and console games. He was later transferred to Konami's Bemani division where he contributed several tracks that have been featured in the GuitarFreaks series of video games as well as Dance Dance Revolution Supernova. He left the company in 2013 to form his own music brand called Elephant15+.

== Soundtracks ==
- Gradius III (Arcade) - 1989
- Surprise Attack (Arcade) - 1990
- Teenage Mutant Ninja Turtles II: The Arcade Game (NES) - 1990
- The Lone Ranger (NES) - 1991
- Teenage Mutant Ninja Turtles III: The Manhattan Project (NES) - 1991
- Monster in My Pocket (NES) - 1992
- Zen: Intergalactic Ninja (NES) - 1993
- Rakugakids (N64) - 1998
