= Ganbare Goemon: Mononoke Dōchū Tobidase Nabe-Bugyō! =

1999 video game

- Developer: KCEK
- Publisher: Konami
- Director: Kōji Horie
- Producers: Shigeharu Umezaki; Etsunobu Ebisu
- Designers: Kazuhiro Namba; Kiyoko Kanaji
- Composers: Sōtarō Tojima; Takeshi Iwakiri
- Series: Ganbare Goemon
- Platform: Game Boy Color
- Release: JP: December 16, 1999
- Genre: Role-playing game
- Mode: Single-player

Ganbare Goemon: Mononoke Dōchū Tobidase Nabe-Bugyō! (がんばれゴエモン〜もののけ道中 飛び出せ鍋奉行!〜; lit. "On the Way to Mononoke, Jump Out and be a Nabe Magistrate!) is a role-playing video game developed by Konami Computer Entertainment Kobe and released by Konami for the Game Boy Color on December 16, 1999. It is the seventeenth installment in the Ganbare Goemon series overall.

== Gameplay ==
The gameplay is similar to the other RPGs in the series, in which the player controls their party from an overhead map and explores each area getting quests and items in order to advance the main plot. While they control a party, combat is strictly one-on-one, as the game attempts to join the Pokémon craze with "dueling" combat between individual monsters. Additionally, the player can capture and train the monsters they defeat, and even upgrade them or merge them with other creatures to obtain additional powers. The game can also connect with the similarly-themed Goemon Mononoke Sugoroku for Nintendo 64, in order to transfer and exchange monsters between both titles.
