= Konami Krazy Racers =

2001 video game

- Konami Krazy Racers box art featuring eight playable characters. From left to right:Takosuke, Nyami, Goemon, Dracula, Power Pro, Pastel, Cyborg Ninja, and Moai.
- Developer: Konami Computer Entertainment Kobe (KCEC)
- Publisher: Konami
- Director: Toyokazu Nonaka
- Producers: Etsunobu Ebisu; Keita Kawaminami
- Programmers: Hiroshi Shibata; Junichi Taniguchi; Ken Yokota
- Artists: Toyokazu Nonaka; Shōichi Maekawa; Chieko Tobioka
- Composer: Sotaro Tojima
- Platforms: Game Boy Advance, Wii U
- Release: Game Boy Advance: JP: March 21, 2001; NA: June 11, 2001; PAL: June 22, 2001; Wii U Virtual Console: EU: October 15, 2015; NA: November 26, 2015; JP: February 3, 2016
- Genre: Kart racing
- Modes: Single-player, multiplayer

Konami Krazy Racers (Note: Known in Japan as Konami Wai Wai Racing Advance (コナミ ワイワイレーシング アドバンス, Konami Wai Wai Rēshingu Adobansu).) is a 2001 kart racing game developed and published by Konami for the Game Boy Advance. Released as a launch title for the system, Konami Krazy Racers uses a variety of characters and concepts from multiple different Konami franchises, including Castlevania, Metal Gear, and Gradius. It plays similarly to the Mario Kart series, with eight characters per circuit and offensive/defensive items placed at predetermined points in the tracks.

Konami Krazy Racers received positive reviews upon release. It was later released through the Virtual Console for the Wii U in 2015.

== Gameplay ==
Gameplay screenshot

Konami Krazy Racers plays similarly to other kart racing games. Each race begins at the starting line, where eight racers are lined up in certain positions. Each of the seven computers are placed in the closest seven positions to the starting line, but the player character always starts a circuit in eighth place. This placement may change in the next race of the circuit depending on how well the racers do. If the player places first, he or she will be in the first position, as the placement in the following races is based on how the racers did in the previous race. The race is seen from behind the player, and uses Mode 7-style scaling to simulate the three dimensions. A timer will count down to indicate the beginning of the race, and the player must hold down a button to accelerate at the beginning. The player can pick up coins off of the track which may be spent on items in a shop, and depending on the character the player controls, he or she may try to cause another player to spin-out. The player may use other buttons to do such actions as jump and brake, which aides in maneuverability.

Placed throughout the races are red and blue bells. The red bells contain any variety of items, while the blue bell contains a speed-boosting item.

=== Characters ===
Konami Krazy Racers features a total of 12 characters from various Konami series. Each character features unique statistics, including weight, speed, and acceleration.

- Beartank (Rakugakids)
- Dracula (Castlevania)
- Ebisumaru (Legend of the Mystical Ninja)
- Goemon (Legend of the Mystical Ninja)
- Gray Fox (Metal Gear)
- King (Pop'n Music)
- Moai (Gradius)
- Nyami (Pop'n Music)
- Pastel (TwinBee)
- Power Pro-kun (Power Pros)
- Takosuke (Parodius)
- Vic Viper (Gradius)

== Reception ==
Reception

Aggregate score
Aggregator	Score
Metacritic	78/100

Review scores
Publication	Score
AllGame	4/5
Edge	6/10
Electronic Gaming Monthly	8.67/10 (Note: In Electronic Gaming Monthly's review of the game, two critics gave it each a score of 8.5/10, and the other gave it 9/10.)
Eurogamer	8/10
Famitsu	25/40
Game Informer	7/10
GameSpot	8.1/10
GameSpy	82%
IGN	8/10
Next Generation	3/5
Nintendo Power	3.5/5
Nintendo World Report	9/10

The game received "generally favorable reviews" according to the review aggregation website Metacritic. NextGen was generally positive to the game, but regarded it inferior to the then-upcoming Mario Kart: Super Circuit. In Japan, Famitsu gave it a score of 25 out of 40. Four-Eyed Dragon of GamePro said, "If you are in need of a serious kart racing fix, Konami Krazy Racers is it—mainly because it's the only kart racer out so far." (Note: GamePro gave the game 3.5/5 for graphics, 2.5/5 for sound, 4/5 for control, and 3/5 for fun factor.)

It was ranked #10 on a top ten list of the best Game Boy Advance games in Electronic Gaming Monthly, beating Mario Kart: Super Circuit, another Game Boy Advance kart racing game.

== Sequel ==
Krazy Kart Racing is a sequel to the title released in 2009 initially for iOS and in 2011 for Android. It features a total of 12 characters from Konami franchises, four of which return from Konami Krazy Racers. GameRankings aggregated a score of 73 out of 100 for the game. Pocket Gamer gave it three-and-a-half stars out of five.
