= Ganbare Goemon 2: Kiteretsu Shōgun McGuiness =

1993 video game

- Super Famicom cover art
- Developer: Konami
- Publisher: Konami
- Director: Etsunobu Ebisu
- Producer: Shigeharu Umezaki
- Designer: Koichi Ogawa
- Composers: Kazuhiko Uehara; Tomoya Tomita; Nobuyuki Akena
- Series: Ganbare Goemon
- Platforms: Super Famicom, Game Boy Advance
- Release: Super Famicom: JP: December 22, 1993; Game Boy Advance: JP: April 21, 2005
- Genre: Action-adventure
- Modes: Single-player, multiplayer

Ganbare Goemon 2: Kiteretsu Shōgun McGuiness (がんばれゴエモン2 奇天烈将軍マッギネス? lit. "Go For It Goemon 2: Very Strange General McGuiness") is an action-adventure game by Konami, which was released for the Super Famicom in 1993.

It was also ported to the Game Boy Advance along with Ganbare Goemon: Yukihime Kyūshutsu Emaki as Kessakusen! Ganbare Goemon 1 & 2 only in Japan in 2005.

It is the second game in the Japanese video game series Ganbare Goemon to be released on the Super Famicom, and a sequel to The Legend of the Mystical Ninja, and the eighth mainline installment overall. It has also been released for the Virtual Console in Japan. The game was re-released 2026 via the Ganbare Goemon! Daishūgō compilation.

== Gameplay ==
Goemon inside the Goemon Impact mecha running across the field while destroying buildings

In contrast to its predecessor, the majority of the game involves vertically and horizontally scrolling platform levels. The main characters and basic gameplay elements remain the same however, with the game being a cross-genre, cooperative platformer with RPG elements and sub-games scattered across a number of towns.

== Plot ==
The game features a general from the west called McGuinness who invades Japan with an army of bunny men led by warriors known as the Marvel 5. The plot is an allusion to Matthew C. Perry's visit to Japan in the 19th century.

== Development and release ==
Ganbare Goemon 2: Kiteretsu Shōgun McGuiness was developed by Konami. An English fan translation was created by DDSTranslation and released in 2020.

== Reception ==
Reception

Review scores
Publication	Score
Consoles +	93%
Computer and Video Games	90/100
Edge	9/10
Famitsu	31/40
GamesMaster	93%
Joypad	90%
Mega Fun	85%
Super Play	90%
Super Control	92%
Super Gamer	89/100
Super Power	91/100

The game was critically acclaimed. In March 1994, Super Play awarded it 90% and stated that the game was "even more satisfying than the original" with "much more detailed and involving" platform sections. It summarised the game as being "one of the most consistently entertaining and enjoyable games" on any system. Computer and Video Games described the game as original, challenging and large, and as one of the best games released on the SNES that year. Edge described the game as taking "all the best bits from the original" and simplifying them, thus mitigating the criticisms levelled at the predecessor for being too sprawling and open. It summarised the game as blending "brilliant" graphics, "great" sound and "near perfect" playability into one "explosive" package. According to Peer Schneider of IGN in a retrospective, "Goemon 2 is the best co-op platformer on the Super NES", and had critical success in Japan.

== Sequels ==
Two further sequels were released for the Super Famicom: Ganbare Goemon 3: Shishi Jūrokubē no Karakuri Manjigatame in 1994, and Ganbare Goemon Kirakira Dōchū: Boku ga Dancer ni Natta Wake in 1995.
