= Mr. Goemon =

1985 video game

- Developer: Konami
- Publisher: Konami
- Series: Ganbare Goemon
- Platform: Arcade
- Release: JP: May 1986
- Genre: Platform
- Modes: Single-player, multiplayer

Mr. Goemon (Note: Japanese: Ｍｒ．五右衛門, Hepburn: Misutā Goemon) is a 1986 platform video game developed and published by Konami for arcades. The titular character is based on Ishikawa Goemon, an outlaw in 16th-century Japan. It is the first game in the Ganbare Goemon series.

== Gameplay ==
The player controls the titular Goemon, a thief in Edo who seeks to defeat demons in the city. Goemon travels through numerous stages while defeating enemies with a pipe or throwable object. He can jump on enemies to stun and push them off the levels. Enemies charge and grab the character, ending his life unless the player jostles the control stick to break free. Later enemies also have projectile weapons that the player must dodge. Levels feature either boss battles or a pile of gold bars at the end, worth various points depending on the level.

== Ports ==
Microsoft Studios released Mr. Goemon for its Game Room service in June 2010. Hamster Corporation released the game for the PlayStation 4 in 2014 and Nintendo Switch in 2019 as part of the Arcade Archives series.

== Reception ==
In Japan, Game Machine listed Mr. Goemon on their July 1, 1986 issue as being the seventeenth most-successful table arcade unit of the month.
