= The Legend of the Mystical Ninja =

1991 video game

- North American SNES cover art
- Developer: Konami
- Publisher: Konami
- Designer: Shigeharu Umezaki
- Programmers: Nobuhiro Matsuoka; Yasuo Okuda; Toshinori Shimono; Koji Yoshida
- Artists: Takeshi Fujimoto; Setsu Muraki; Kumiko Ogawa; Takeo Yakushiji
- Composers: Kazuhiko Uehara; Harumi Ueko
- Series: Ganbare Goemon
- Platforms: Super NES, Game Boy Advance
- Release: Super NES: JP: July 19, 1991; NA: February 1992; PAL: 1994; Game Boy Advance: JP: April 21, 2005
- Genre: Action-adventure
- Modes: Single-player, multiplayer

The Legend of the Mystical Ninja (Note: Japanese: がんばれゴエモン〜ゆき姫救出絵巻(ひめきゅうしゅつえまき)〜, Hepburn: Ganbare Goemon: Yukihime Kyūshutsu Emaki; lit. Good Luck Goemon: Yukihime Rescue) is a 1991 action-adventure game released by Konami for the Super Nintendo Entertainment System. It was also ported to the Game Boy Advance along with Ganbare Goemon 2: Kiteretsu Shōgun McGuiness in 2005 only in Japan.

It is the first game in the Japanese video game series Ganbare Goemon to have a western release and the fifth mainline game overall. It has also been released for the Wii Virtual Console in 2007, the Wii U Virtual Console in 2013 (2014 in Europe and Australia), and the Nintendo 3DS Virtual Console in 2016. The game was re-released in 2026 via the Ganbare Goemon! Daishūgō compilation.

== Gameplay ==
Although both characters have different weapons and learn different attacks, they are functionally identical. Their primary short-range weapons have three levels and are improved in range by acquiring grey cats left by defeated enemies. Both characters are also equipped with thrown weapons from the beginning (which decreases money as the player uses it) and can acquire bombs by purchasing them in stores or by winning them in mini-games.

Goemon fighting on the first level

Each character can learn four Judo abilities which are functionally identical between the two characters. Level 1 Judo provides an animal companion for the character which they ride and can use to ram into enemies. Level 2 Judo releases an attack that can damage all enemies on the screen. Level 3 Judo gives the characters the ability to fly temporarily. Level 4 Judo unleashes a powerful repetitive attack.

Most stages (known as "Warlock Zones") are separated into two sections. The first section is centered on town exploration where players gather information, buy items, learn special Judo attacks, play minigames, earn money, etc. One of the most notable mini-games available is a recreation of the first level in Gradius, but also includes games such as air hockey, trivia, dice games, and even a lottery.

The second section of each stage is a platforming section where the players fight through minor enemies until they reach the end and defeat a boss. In two-player mode, the characters can work together by having one ride the other piggy-back style. The character riding controls the attacks, while the character being ridden controls the movement and jumping. This can simplify areas with large or awkward jumps as it only requires one player to land successfully. After each stage is completed, a small scene occurs furthering the mostly simple and lighthearted plot, and the next stage is revealed.

== Plot ==
The players control Goemon (loosely inspired by the historical Goemon) and Ebisumaru (the two are called Kid Ying and Dr. Yang respectively in all non-Japanese releases of this game).

After noticing some odd occurrences in their hometown of Oedo, involving a Ghost Woman at the local temple and ghost animals that come from the temple at night, Goemon and Ebisumaru decide to investigate. After defeating the Ghost Woman, she reveals herself to be Kurobei, a ninja cat. She explains that she was looking for strong people to help her, then offers the duo money and tells them to search for her boss, Koban, on Shikoku Island. Upon arrival, they find Hyotoko dancers in town during a festival, of whom some of the townspeople are suspicious. After finding and defeating the Lantern Man, leader of the evil dancers, they rescue Koban, who informs them that Princess Yuki, daughter of the Emperor, is believed to have been kidnapped by an odd group of mimes and clowns counterfeiters known as the Otafu Army. His clan of ninja cats were unable to investigate further because of devices the army has that disable their shapeshifting powers. He then directs the duo to nearby Awaji Island, where Goemon and Ebisumaru find that the army has set up a bizarre, anachronistic amusement park. The pair then make their way across the park to the nearby town of Yamato, where they discover that the army has been recruiting the townspeople. Upon invading the Otafu HQ and defeating its leaders, they free Yae, the ninja. She tells them that the Otafu Army never had Yuki, but that a wise man in Iga may be able to help them. The Old Wise Man's palace in Iga is guarded by an army of robotic clockwork ninjas, and the pair fight through the palace and its leader, Sasuke, to get to the old man's chamber. The Old Wise Man tells them that the White Mirror in the Dragon Pond of faraway Izumo can find what they seek. He uses his "Miracle Transport Machine" (which is only a cannon) to shoot them there. To save the princess, the protagonists must travel through different regions of Japan to find clues about the army and the location of the princess.

== Reception ==
Reception

Review scores
Publication	Score
Computer and Video Games	93/100
Electronic Gaming Monthly	8/10, 8/10, 9/10, 8/10
Eurogamer	6/10
Famitsu	7/10, 7/10, 7/10, 6/10
Game Informer	9/10
GameSpot	6.6/10
Games-X	4/5
IGN	8.5/10
Nintendo Life	8/10; 7/10
Official Nintendo Magazine	92/100
Super Play	90%
Total!	(UK) 90% (DE) 1-
VideoGames & Computer Entertainment	6/10
Game Boy	4/5, 4/5, 4/5, 5/5, 4/5
Hippon Super!	7/10
Mean Machines	92%
N-Force	95%
Nintendo Game Zone	93/100; 90/100
SNES Force	92/100
Super Action	70%
The Super Famicom	A
Super Gamer	89%
Super Pro	89/100

According to Famitsu, The Legend of the Mystical Ninja sold 51,680 copies in its first week on the market and 521,205 copies during its lifetime in Japan. The Japanese publication Micom BASIC Magazine ranked the game second in popularity in its October 1991 issue, and it received a 24.78/30 score in a 1993 readers' poll conducted by Super Famicom Magazine, ranking among Super Famicom titles at the number 10 spot. It also garnered generally favorable reception from critics.

In 2010, the game was included as one of the titles in the book 1001 Video Games You Must Play Before You Die. GamesRadar ranked it as the 45th best SNES game for its "stellar ancient Japan-inspired soundtrack, beautiful graphics alive with color, and just enough challenge to make it a very addictive affair. It's not breaking down any barriers for platforming or RPGs, but it's definitely one of the top games on the SNES." In 1995, Total! rated the game 79th on their Top 100 SNES Games writing: "It's a mixture of arcade action and role playing and what's more it's a right bloody good laugh." IGN listed the game 32nd in its "Top 100 SNES Games of All Time."

According to Electronic Gaming Monthly, the game "didn't catch on too much in the U.S." but was popular in Japan.

== Legacy ==
Three direct sequels were released for the Super Famicom: Ganbare Goemon 2: Kiteretsu Shōgun McGuiness in 1993, Ganbare Goemon 3: Shishi Jūrokubē no Karakuri Manjigatame in 1994, and Ganbare Goemon Kirakira Dōchū: Boku ga Dancer ni Natta Wake in 1995.

The Legend of the Mystical Ninja was released for the Wii Virtual Console service in 2007 in Japan on March 13, Europe and Australia on March 30, and North America on April 30. It was also released six years later for the Wii U Virtual Console service in 2013 in Japan on September 4, North America on December 5, and Europe and Australia the following year on January 16, 2014. The New 3DS Virtual Console service received the game in 2016 in Japan on June 4, North America on July 7, and Europe and Australia on August 25. The Legend of the Mystical Ninja was also made available exclusively in Japan as part of the Super Famicom Mini console's lineup alongside its release on October 5, 2017.
