= Goemon: Shin Sedai Shūmei! =

2001 video game

- Developers: KCET; Now Production
- Publisher: Konami
- Series: Ganbare Goemon
- Platforms: PlayStation, Game Boy Advance
- Release: PlayStation: JP: December 20, 2001; Game Boy Advance: JP: February 28, 2002
- Genre: Action-adventure
- Mode: Single-player

Goemon: Shin Sedai Shūmei! (Note: ゴエモン 新世代襲名! (Hepburn: lit. Goemon: The Successor for a New Generation!)) is an action platforming game in the Ganbare Goemon series released for the PlayStation on December 20, 2001, in Japan. Developed by Konami Computer Entertainment Tokyo and Now Production, it is a futuristic spin-off of the original Ganbare Goemon series starring new characters who inherit the namesakes of the original cast in a more modern setting.

In February 2002, a companion game – Goemon: New Age Shutsudō! (Note: ゴエモン ニューエイジ出動! (Japanese: lit. Goemon: Send Forth the New Age!)) – was released for the Game Boy Advance. While this game shares the same general story and aesthetics as the original, it features a rewritten script, new level layouts, and various modifications from the PlayStation game.
