= Mystical Ninja Starring Goemon =

1997 video game

- North American cover art
- Developer: Konami Computer Entertainment Osaka
- Publisher: Konami
- Director: Etsunobu Ebisu
- Producer: Shigeharu Umezaki
- Designers: Keita Kawaminami; Madoka Yamauchi
- Programmer: Etsunobu Ebisu
- Writer: Keita Kawaminami
- Composers: Shigeru Araki; Yusuke Kato; Saiko Miki; Yasumasa Kitagawa
- Series: Ganbare Goemon
- Platform: Nintendo 64
- Release: JP: August 7, 1997; NA: April 16, 1998; EU: April 18, 1998
- Genre: Action-adventure
- Mode: Single-player

Mystical Ninja Starring Goemon (Note: Known in Japan as Ganbare Goemon: Neo Momoyama Bakufu no Odori (Japanese: がんばれゴエモン~ネオ桃山幕府(ももやまばくふ)のおどり~; lit. Go for it, Goemon: Dance of the Neo Peach Mountain Shogunate)) is a 1997 platform action-adventure game developed by Konami Computer Entertainment Osaka and published by Konami for the Nintendo 64. The second Ganbare Goemon game released in North America and Europe, and the twelfth mainline installment overall, follows The Legend of the Mystical Ninja and features hybrid elements of platform games and action-adventure games.

The story follows Goemon's struggles to prevent the Peach Mountain Shoguns gang from turning Japan into a Westernized fine arts theater. The plot calls for three cinematic musical features and battles between giant robots; like other Ganbare Goemon games, it is peppered with surrealist humor and anachronisms.

Mystical Ninja Starring Goemon sold nearly 200,000 units worldwide. Reviewers praised its graphics, gameplay, and humorous plot, while criticizing its virtual camera and questioning how accessible its references and jokes would be to Western audiences. Despite this, the game has developed a cult following that is still actively developing mods for the game.

== Gameplay ==
Players navigate Goemon through forests, fields, dungeons, and other three-dimensional models of feudal Japanese places. Goemon and his friends can walk or run, jump, attack, and use special abilities to cross terrain, pick up money, and defeat enemies. Players control only one of the four characters at a time but can cycle through them with the press of a button. Hearts at the bottom of the screen show a character's health. If damage is taken, a character loses a heart. Some items and acts replenish health, and a Maneki-neko (Luck Cat) adds a heart to the overall health. If all hearts are lost, the player restarts at the entrance to the field map they died in and the player's number of lives declines by one. If the player loses all lives, the game restarts at the last point saved or at the beginning of the game if a Controller Pak is not used.

An Impact battle, in which the player must duel a giant robot

Traveling through Japan, players visit towns and coffeehouses safe from enemies, where they can eat in restaurants or sleep in inns to refill health and buy armor or riceballs (a self-acting item that refills health by itself). Many interactive non-player characters populate cities and talk with other characters to uncover plot devices or idle gossip. Players save their progress in towns with a Controller Pak at the inns or at the entrance to some dungeons. Some places are impassable prohibiting the use of special abilities unlocked by completing minigames. For example, Ebisumaru must hide in a giant's cupboard to learn self-shrinking magic, an art that allows passing through small holes. The player has two wayfaring tools: a status screen that shows found items, weapons, and player characters and a map screen shows where they are in Japan. In dungeons, the map screen shows the building's floorplan if they have the item Mr. Elly Fant. At the end of each dungeon is a boss, a more difficult than normal enemy with hearts of its own.

Beating a boss can trigger a cutscene, after which Goemon appears outside the dungeon or mans his giant robot friend Impact to thwart an enemy robot (although not mentioned in the manual, these segments of gameplay support the Rumble Pak accessory). These sequences begin with a music video and a high-speed minigame in which Impact must smash structures and avoid hazards while racing across the countryside. The points gained by destroying buildings determine how many health points (measured in oil) Impact will have in the coming battle. Players control Impact from a cockpit behind his eyes where gauges show enemy and player health and ammunition. Impact can punch, kick, defend, reel in opponents with the chain pipe, and use projectile weaponry, including nasal bullets and a laser. Collecting all the fortune cats and beating the game enables an Impact tournament mode with a special image of the robots as the prize for winning.

== Plot ==
=== Characters ===
The protagonist of Mystical Ninja is Goemon, a hot-blooded, kiseru-wielding ninja with blue, bushy hair loosely based on the legendary thief Ishikawa Goemon. The lord of Oedo asks him to find those who maimed Oedo Castle. Goemon lives in Oedo Town and is friends with Ebisumaru, a strange, gluttonous fat man who wears a blue bandana. Ebisumaru is defined as lazy and perverted. Their kunai-throwing friend Sasuke is a mechanical ninja (made by the Wise Man of Iga) who enjoys hot baths and Japanese tea. The fourth of the heroes is Yae, a fierce sword-wielding kunoichi, who runs into Goemon's band in Zazen Town. The villains of the game hail from the organization Peach Mountain Shoguns and include a gang of four "weirdos" led by Spring Breeze Dancin' (Danshin Harukaze) and Kitty Lily (Margaret Ranko). They intend to transform Japan into a stage for their talents.

=== Story ===
While shopping in Oedo Town, Goemon and Ebisumaru feel the ground quake as a peach-shaped flying object sails overhead. The vessel fires a laser at Oedo Castle, turning it into a European-style castle with spires and flags. Worried for the safety of the Lord of Oedo and his daughter, Goemon and Ebisumaru retrieve a chain pipe from Mt. Fuji and assault the castle. Inside is Baron, a member of the fashion-loving Gang of Four who reveals he was sent to turn the castle into a stage. Goemon shrugs him off and defeats the King Robot Congo to free the Lord and find a "miracle item". The Lord asks Goemon to catch them and gives a Super Pass for access to the roads of Japan.

Goemon sets out to the Wise Man's house for assistance, but the house explodes as he approaches. A fuming Baron comes forth and mans his kabuki robot. Goemon finds a Triton shell in the rubble that can call Impact, who lays ruin to the kabuki robot. In Zazen Town, Goemon finds Yae, who claims the troublemakers responsible are Flake Gang members named the Peach Mountain Shoguns. Yae joins Goemon, and they learn that children with dancing talent have been kidnapped around the region. Goemon and his friends must also fight against Benkei, a gatekeeper blocking the Gojo Ohashi Bridge leading out of Zazen Town. In order to defeat him, Goemon needs help from a young fisherman named Ushiwaka. It is hinted that Benkei and Ushiwaka are kind of rivals. Ashamed at his loss against Goemon and his friends, the man offers Goemon the mechanical robot Sasuke, thrown there by the explosion of the Wise Man's house. Goemon accepts the unconscious, powerless Sasuke and walks to Kii-Awaji island, where the dragon-powered passenger ferry has been stopped by the dragon's sudden craze. Goemon teleports to the dragon and finds a Gang of Four member named Colon who used the dragon to kidnap children; he then breaks Colon's mind-control device. The dragon turns back to human and crashes near a shrine.

The human calls himself Koryuta, son of the Dragon God, and apologizes for the kidnappings. He pledges help in transporting the heroes across Japan, and claims the kids are at the Dogo Hot Springs. Goemon travels to Iyo but finds the Hot Springs closed; the only entrance is a mouse hole. He learns from travelers that sweets in the Zazen Town shrine can make a person smaller. Ebisumaru offers to steal the sweets. With the dwarf power the group infiltrate the Ghost Toys Castle, a dark house of traps, toys, and a giant pool table. Colon faces Goemon with the robot Dharmanyo, but is crushed and lets go his miracle item. The hidden man aboard the peach ship at Oedo comes out calling himself Spring Breeze Dancin'. He pokes fun at the group with nicknames and instructs Colon to retreat. With the children liberated, Goemon follows Colon to the Chu-goku Region, where he revives Sasuke with two batteries. They enter the Festival Temple, a Peach Mountain base.

They destroy a guard robot, prompting Gang of Four member Sharon to appear with Kitty Lily, the second leader of the Peach Mountain Shoguns. Lily boasts that Kyushu is a stage and asks Sharon to return to base after buying some foundation. Alarmed, Goemon and friends rush off to the bridge to Kyushu and find Omitsu on her way to deliver dumplings. Stunned by Omitsu's seeming ruggedness, Goemon forgets to warn her of danger, and the island rises into odd thunder clouds in the sky. A fortune teller instructs the group to set out north to Mount Fear to find a way to Kyushu. After necessary weight training to remove obstacles, Goemon finds the northeast Festival Village and learns of a psychic witch. The witch summons Wise Man, who tells Goemon to gather the fourth miracle items at the Stone Circle near Festival Village for passage into outer space and Kyushu. Goemon investigates reports of stolen food in the village while Yae undergoes training to become a mermaid. The two paths converge when Yae finds the Gourmet Submarine, a Peach Mountain vessel containing hordes of food. After sidestepping grills and swimming through gallons of soup, Goemon confronts Poron, the final weirdo, who jokes that he lost the last miracle item in Zazen Town.

Lily enters by hologram to ridicule the party, but is rudely interrupted by Dancin', who continues to call Goemon "Fernandez". Dancin' instructs Poron to activate the ship's self-destruct sequence. Goemon escapes by calling Impact and defeats a mermaid giant robot. In Zazen Town, a kappa named Kihachi desires to trade the miracle item for cucumber made by the priest's son. The son sits on a precipice inaccessible save through jumping training; Sasuke volunteers in the Chu-goku Region and acquires the miracle item. At the Stone Circle, the Pemopemo God awakens and asks the heroes if they have the courage to venture to outer space. Goemon affirms their decision and the group enters Kyushu through the Gorgeous Music Castle. They discover Sogen Town has been converted to a garden city with European architecture. Goemon locates Omitsu and learns that Dancin' and Lily can be found past a rigid gate, accessible only with the help of Wise Man.

Stunned to find him alive, Goemon learns that in exchange for building the Instant Stage Beam and mechanical robots, the Peach Mountain Shoguns gave Wise Man five car magazines and a muscle car poster. Enraged to learn of his home's demise, Wise Man helps Goemon enter the castle. Kitty Lily and Dancin' confront the heroes with the elaborate musical number Gorgeous My Stage before a self-destruct sequence begins. Goemon summons Impact to fly into outer space, where he thwarts the giant peach ship Balberra and duels Lily and Dancin' in their personal battle robot. Dancin' mocks Goemon in defeat, and Impact sends their robot's head far into outer space to reveal a picture of Dancin' and Lily smiling among the stars. Goemon returns to Japan to find a horde of girls rushing towards him, and awaits their praise for saving Japan. The group is shocked to find the girls angry over the apparent death of their idol, Spring Breeze Dancin'.

=== Humor ===
The story of Mystical Ninja Starring Goemon, a quest to thwart dancers in a peach-shaped spaceship from using laser weaponry to convert Japan to a giant stage and its citizens to loyal dancers, is steeped in surrealist and Japanese humor. Many reviewers and writers commented on the humor in the plot and dialogue. The game's dialogue is peppered with offbeat humor, and a few instances of sexual innuendo. In the Japanese version, Wise Man collected hentai magazines and pornographic posters rather than automotive publications. A laugh track punctuates certain jokes.

== Development and audio ==
"Theme of Mystical Ninja"
A 30-second sample of the game's lyrical main theme.

"Use the Ice Kunai on the Fox's Fire (Festival Temple)"
A 30-second sample of the final theme from the festival temple dungeon shows how the soundtrack unites modern and traditional forms.

Mystical Ninja Starring Goemon was developed by Konami Computer Entertainment Osaka. It was first titled Ganbare Goemon 5, then Legend of the Mystical Ninja. The Japanese producers wished to break the series' numerical naming pattern to stress that Mystical Ninja differed from its forefathers. Originally made with a two-player mode, this feature was scrapped months before the Japanese release. Early development pictures showed Impact battling in a modern city against a handgun-wielding foe. Later images touted the battle against the Wartime Kabuki Robot Kashiwagi taking place over a forest and village. Konami released many renders of Goemon posing and making faces for magazine previews. A 60–70% complete build of the game was featured at E3 in June 1997, suffering from graphical clipping and camera issues. Konami later presented a mostly finished build at the Tokyo Game Show in September 1997. Developers aimed to make the game "very visual" with new content, and the game's marketers echoed this by using large, colorful advertisements. Konami targeted children, among whom the series is popular in Japan, by scheduling appearances of a Goemon mascot at some elementary school gymnastics sessions. The game's later success prompted the production of an animated television show. The series followed Goemon as he struggled against evil after being transported to modern society, where he befriended an elementary school student. Its release in the United States was planned for winter 1997, then February 1998, but was ultimately delayed to two more months.

Mystical Ninja featured a cartridge size of 128 megabits, designed to be much larger than most of its peers and predecessor games to allow high quality musical numbers and voice samples. In total, there are three musical numbers—Theme of Ganbare Goemon, I Am Impact, and Gorgeous My Stage. They feature the talents of Hironobu Kageyama, Ichirou Mizuki, and Toshihiro Tachibana and Etsuyo Ota respectively. The song's main soundtrack is composed of a mix of traditional Japanese and modern instruments integrated in original arrangements. The dungeons feature minimalistic songs which grow in complexity and length as the player proceeds deeper into the lair. The soundtrack on whole is a collaborative effort by four composers. The musical numbers, with forty tunes from the game and one remix of I Am Impact, were released October 3, 1997 on CD. The soundtrack was later extracted from Read-only memory and presented in Nintendo Ultra 64 Sound Format on May 9, 2005; it is one of the most downloaded releases at USF Central.

In 2018, the 8-Bit Big Band recorded a cover of the song "I am Impact!"

== Reception ==
Reception

Aggregate score
Aggregator	Score
Metacritic	67/100

Review scores
Publication	Score
AllGame	3.5/5
CNET Gamecenter	2/10
Electronic Gaming Monthly	9/10, 8/10, 8/10, 7/10
Famitsu	8/10, 7/10, 7/10, 6/10
Game Informer	8/10
GameFan	89%, 94%, 93%
GameRevolution	C−
GameSpot	6.7/10
Hyper	83%
IGN	7.6/10
N64 Magazine	(EU) 90% (JP) 80%
Next Generation	3/5
Nintendo Life	8/10
Nintendo Power	7.1/10

The game received "average" reviews according to the review aggregation website Metacritic. In Japan, Famitsu gave it a score of 28 out of 40. Many magazines gave the game favorable reviews while it was still in development.

Reviewers praised the game's story and setting for its quirky, unique flavor. Nintendojo opined that Mystical Ninja features a simple control configuration and easy learning curve. A reviewer for The News Tribune considered the presentation "a terrific upgrade from the Super Nintendo version" but the play control "not as fluid as it is in Super Mario 64". 64 Lightland found the game prone to slowdown, and decried the inability to pause the game during Impact battles. Edge gave the game eight out of ten in two separate reviews, first saying of the Japanese import, "as the biggest thirdparty [sic] N64 game yet, it's an important release for the machine in Japan, and Konami should think hard before denying Western gamers its charms" (#50, October 1997); and later calling the PAL version "a vast and sprawling experience. The work done on the release is a trimuph for Konami that augurs well for the future" (#58, May 1998).

The variety of gameplay styles was frequently cited as one of the game's best assets. Kraig Kujawa of Electronic Gaming Monthly elaborated that the unexpected shifts in gameplay style and perspective keep the adventure feeling fresh, and serve to provide some of the most humorous moments in the game. GameSpot said that though Mystical Ninja Starring Goemon borrows heavily from Super Mario 64, its gameplay is more varied and, due to it having the most memory of any Nintendo 64 cartridge to date, it has a much wider variety of textures.

A room in the Gourmet Submarine. The game received praise for its detailed graphics.

Critics enjoyed the soundtrack's integration of pop and shamisen-laden traditional Japanese music. IGN declared that the songs would "permanently burn themselves into your brain" (echoed by Ge-Iro Review, who predicted that the music would not grow tiresome). Sakekan said the Impact song cultivates a heroic atmosphere for ensuing battles. Reviewers criticized the camera system as being difficult to manipulate and occasionally preventing players from seeing key parts of the environment, resulting in extremely difficult platform jumping sequences. The Dallas Morning News decried not being able to save progress inside castles, which become "harder and more complex" with time. Reviewers fluent with past Ganbare Goemon games argued that the absence of the series' numerous minigames and two-player mode hampered Mystical Ninja's replay value, and 64 Lightland felt that the transition to three dimensions had deprived the game of the traditional Goemon feel. Contrarily, Kujawa asserted that "Konami has done a wonderful job of bringing the Mystical Ninja series to a polygonal environment."

Mystical Ninja's localization was criticized often. Nintendo Power said the translation is poor and the story nonsensical, GamePro found the untranslated battle cries to be alienating to U.S. gamers, and a critic for The Tampa Tribune wrote, "attempts at humor often come across as rather inane. Early conversations with village residents only add to the confusion." The News Tribune countered that the strange localization often compounded the surrealist humor through the use of weird, unusual English and grammar. GameSpot and IGN maintained that the localization is exemplary, and that the content of the game is simply too specifically Japanese to be relatable or even understandable to the average non-Japanese gamer.

Next Generation described the game as lively and varied, though considerably flawed. GamePro said the game "never gets anywhere near exciting" and has a bland story, but succeeds well enough on the platforming front to make an acceptable holdover for RPG enthusiasts who could not wait for The Legend of Zelda: Ocarina of Time. (Note: GamePro gave the game 4.5/5 for graphics, two 4/5 scores for sound and control, and 3.5/5 for fun factor in an early review.) IGN concluded that it would hold over gamers until the release of The Legend of Zelda: Ocarina of Time, but advised them to rent before buying. The Dallas Morning News likewise concluded that the game "will please N64 owners starving for a decent adventure game... But players should rent it before they buy." A reviewer for the Sentinel & Enterprise wrote in 2001 that while considered a "flawed 3D platformer", Mystical Ninja offered "quirky" fun "following the heels of Super Mario 64" by inviting players to "scale mountains, invade pagodas, and pilot giant robots in all-out fisticuffs to the rhythm of Japanese lyrics and pop tunes."

The game sold 55,000 units in America and 141,000 units in Japan.

== Sequels ==
Mystical Ninja Starring Goemon was followed by a Game Boy game of the same name. Featuring gameplay similar to the Super Famicom entry Ganbare Goemon 3: Shishijūrokubē no Karakuri Manji Gatame, the game presented a story in which Yae had been kidnapped by the Black Ship Gang. In 1999, Konami released Goemon's Great Adventure on the Nintendo 64 (a 2.5D side-scroller with multiplayer support). Reviewers gave it high marks for recreating the feel of the older, 16-bit Goemon games and considered it the best side-scroller for the Nintendo 64. The final Goemon entry for the Nintendo 64 was Goemon Mononoke Sugoroku, released in Japan on December 25, 1999. In Mononoke Sugoroku, players must collect Ofuda cards while navigating a board game. After a series of sequels on the PlayStation line of consoles, Konami returned to the medieval, quirky Japanese themes of Mystical Ninja and its brethren on June 23, 2005 with Ganbare Goemon: Tōkai Dōchū Ōedo Tengu ri Kaeshi no Maki for the Nintendo DS.
