= Bōken Jidai Katsugeki Goemon =

2000 video game

Bouken Jidai Katsugeki Goemon
- Developer: Konami Computer Entertainment Kobe
- Publisher: Konami
- Director: Kentaro Hisai
- Producer: Etsunobu Ebisu
- Programmer: Masahiro Yamamoto
- Artist: Kentaro Hisai
- Writer: Kenichi Kataoka
- Composers: Tomoaki Hirono; Hajime Takai
- Series: Ganbare Goemon
- Platform: PlayStation 2
- Release: JP: December 21, 2000
- Genres: Action, role-playing
- Mode: Single-player

Bouken Jidai Katsugeki Goemon (冒険時代活劇ゴエモン) is a Ganbare Goemon game released for the PlayStation 2 on December 21, 2000. It is the third game in the series set in a 3D world, following Mystical Ninja Starring Goemon and Ganbare Goemon: Kuru Nara Koi! Ayashige Ikka no Kuroi Kage. Unlike most of the other games, this game departs from the quirky humor that the franchise is known for, and replaces it with a more serious tone.

== Gameplay ==
Inspired by the three-dimensional The Legend of Zelda games with some role-playing game elements, the player assumes the role of Goemon, who is set once again to save Japan. Goemon is able to use a large variety of weapons (including his trademark pipe), as well as equip sub-weapons, items and magic, which can be assigned in 4 hexagons for quick use. Another twist is the addition of a white tiger known as Kotora, whom Goemon can use to attack enemies when he locks on them.

== Localization attempts ==
The now-defunct company Working Designs attempted to bring the game to English audiences as Mystical Ninja Goemon beginning in 2002. Motivated to promote a series "that's never quite received the recognition it deserves here [in the United States]", Working Designs displayed the game in its booth at E3 the same year. Mystical Ninja Goemon remained on the studio's release list until its closing in 2005.
