= Ganbare Goemon: Seikūshi Dynamites Arawaru!! =

2000 video game

- Developer: Konami Computer Entertainment Kobe
- Publisher: Konami
- Composer: Tomoya Tomita
- Series: Ganbare Goemon
- Platform: Game Boy Color
- Release: JP: December 21, 2000
- Genre: Action-adventure
- Modes: Single-player, multiplayer

Ganbare Goemon: Seikūshi Dynamites Arawaru!! (がんばれゴエモン〜星空士ダイナマイッツあらわる!!〜; lit. "Starry Skyman Dynamites Appears!!) is the eighteenth Ganbare Goemon game, released for the Game Boy Color on December 21, 2000. The game was re-released in 2026 via the Ganbare Goemon! Daishūgō compilation.

== Plot ==
On peaceful day in Edo, a spaceship resembling the head of a cat appears in the sky, carrying Spaceman Dynamite, who plans bring trouble to the people below, and hence to Goemon and his friends.

== Gameplay ==
The game alternates between stages featuring either Goemon or Ebisumaru. Each character takes a different route towards the bad guy and as a result the stages scroll differently for each character. The player can collect upgraded items and weapons but there's no character upgrading besides that. The game also features mid-level bonus rounds featuring the rest of Goemon's buddies in several arcade mini-games as traditional for the series.
