= Mystical Ninja Starring Goemon (Game Boy video game) =

1997 video game

- Box cover of Mystical Ninja Starring Goemon (North American version)
- Developer: Konami Computer Entertainment Nagoya
- Publisher: Konami
- Director: Koki Yamashita
- Producer: Hiroyuki Fukui
- Composers: Kaoru Okada; Yoichi Iwata; Rie Tanaka
- Series: Ganbare Goemon
- Platforms: Game Boy, 3DS Virtual Console
- Release: Game Boy: JP: December 4, 1997; WW: April 1998
- Genre: Action-adventure
- Mode: Single-player

Mystical Ninja Starring Goemon (がんばれゴエモン〜黒船党(くろふねとう)の謎(なぞ)〜, Ganbare Goemon: Kurofune Tō no Nazo; lit. "Go Goemon: Mystery of the Black Ship Gang") is an action-adventure video game released by Konami for the Game Boy in 1998. It is the thirteenth mainline installment in the Ganbare Goemon series overall. Featuring gameplay similar to the Super Famicom title Ganbare Goemon 3: Shishijūrokubē no Karakuri Manji Gatame, the game presents a story where Yae has been kidnapped by the Black Ship Gang. Its release immediately followed the Nintendo 64 game of the same name. The game was re-released in 2012 on the Nintendo 3DS Virtual Console, and in 2026 via the Ganbare Goemon! Daishūgō compilation.

== Gameplay ==
Mystical Ninja Starring Goemon featured three characters—Goemon, Sasuke, and Ebisumaru—who can walk, jump, attack, and throw weapons throughout five stages of play. Goemon possessed average abilities and Ebisumaru could throw further, but suffered athletically, while Sasuke could jump high, but could not throw as well as the others. Players control one character at a time to move through each stage and defeat enemies, who attack with close-range and projectile weapons. If the player's character is hit by an enemy, his hit points are decreased; if all are exhausted, the character loses a life and the stage is restarted from the beginning. Hit points can be replenished via hearts scattered throughout the game. At maximum hit points, characters are capable of long-range special attacks. At the end of each stage is a boss enemy with higher health and stronger attacks than other foes. Mystical Ninja features some puzzle elements and mini games, such as fetch quests producing items needed to cross inhospitable terrain or quizzes for bonus items. The game's music kept with the style of other Ganbare Goemon games by employing an "oriental sound". It is compatible with the Super Game Boy and contains a special decorative border for play in this fashion.

== Plot ==
After Yae is kidnapped, Goemon, Ebisumaru, and Sasuke set out to find the Black Ship Gang and rescue her. They first assault Karakuri Castle, the pirates' hideout, where they learn that Baron Skull (the captain of the group) lured Yae to his hideout. They pursue Baron to the Demon Cave, where Goemon discovers clues left behind by the female ninja. They take him to the Black Ship Skull, the flagship of the pirates moored in Gull Harbor. Goemon and his friends destroy the ship without locating Yae, and are aghast to see a second Black Ship Gang vessel sail into harbor. They board it and continue the quest, eventually wresting Yae from Baron Skull's hold.

== Reception ==
A mini game in which Goemon must whack octopuses.

Nintendo Power gave Mystical Ninja Starring Goemon a 6.7 rating on a scale of 1 to 10. The magazine's editors enjoyed the expansive world, but criticized the quality of certain graphical elements, noting that certain hazards and features were "hard to distinguish". The controls received average marks, with Nintendo Power's reviewers decrying the difficulty of dodging due to the high speed of enemy projectiles and movement problems with boss battles. Writers compared the game to The Legend of Zelda series in design, but criticized the automatic regeneration of enemies in each stage—a tenet which made retracing one's steps tedious. The magazine's reviewers noted that Mystical Ninja would provide a challenging experience despite not being as detailed as Zelda games. Nintendo Power's spotlight on the game concluded with the remarks that players should not "expect to get a smaller version of the N64 game"—and although the mini games were 'a blast', the main game is sort of a drag.
