= Ganbare Goemon: Tengu-tō no Gyakushū! =

1999 video game

- Developer: TOSE
- Publisher: Konami
- Series: Ganbare Goemon
- Platform: Game Boy Color
- Release: JP: January 14, 1999
- Genre: Role-playing video game
- Mode: Single-player

Ganbare Goemon: Tengu-tō no Gyakushū! (がんばれゴエモン〜天狗党の逆襲〜 lit. "Go for it, Goemon: The Tengu Party Strikes Back!") is a Japanese role-playing video game developed by TOSE and published by Konami for the Game Boy Color. It is the sixteenth main entry in the Ganbare Goemon series. Unlike most games in the series, this game is actually a role-playing game, a genre which was used first in the Ganbare Goemon Gaiden games for the Famicom. The game also borrows some concepts from the franchise's anime series. The game was re-released in 2026 via the Ganbare Goemon! Daishūgō compilation.

The protagonist in the game is a boy named Hajime, who somehow gets transported into a Ganbare Goemon game and teams with Goemon in order to save Japan from the Tengu Party.
