= Rakugakids =

1998 video game

- European box art
- Developer: Konami Computer Entertainment Kobe
- Publisher: Konami
- Director: Koji Yoshida
- Producer: Shigeharu Umezaki
- Designers: Koji Yoshida; Kentaro Hisai
- Programmers: Kunihiko Noguchi; Fumio Honda; Masahiko Higashiyama
- Artists: Kentaro Hisai; Chisa Matsuda; Megumi Wakayama
- Composers: Tomoya Tomita; Kozo Nakamura; Masahiro Kimura
- Platform: Nintendo 64
- Release: JP: July 23, 1998; EU: December 4, 1998
- Genre: Fighting
- Modes: Single-player, multiplayer

Rakugakids (らくがきっず, Rakugakizzu) is a 2D fighting video game developed by Konami and released for the Nintendo 64 in 1998. The name Rakugakids is a portmanteau of the Japanese word rakugaki (meaning "doodle") and the English word "kids", a reflection of the visual style of the game, which resembled children's drawings.

== Gameplay ==
A screenshot of Rakugakids gameplay.

The game is similar in play to a toned-down Street Fighter. The button layout is the six-button fighting game standard consisting primarily of three punches and three kicks, which combine with various directional commands to produce special secondary moves. All characters have a single-button attack that sends the opponent into the air, where they can be pursued and aerially attacked. To complement this, each character can perform an additional jump while in the air.

Super combos in this game are referred to as "Magic", a player can have up to three levels of Magic represented by three crayons that appear at the bottom of the screen. Super Meter levels can be spent in three ways: offense, where an attack causes heavy damage with a few hits; defense, where an attack causes little damage, but sends the opponent far away; and counter, usable only while the character is blocking, causes medium damage and sends the opponent flying away. Additional characters and secret options can be unlocked based on the amount of total playtime.

== Characters ==
- Astronots (アストロノッツ) drawn by Andy (アンディ): A Buck Rogers-like astronaut and the game's protagonist, he fights using assorted pulp-era sci-fi devices like a raygun and rocket boots.
- Captain. Cat. Kit (キャプテン・キャット・キット) drawn by DDJ: An anthropomorphic cat dressed in hip hop fashion, he fights using brass instruments, a basketball and breakdancing moves and also has the ability to spontaneously combust at will.
- Marsa (マーサ) drawn by Nola (ノーラ): A witch bearing a hat that acts like a chicken, Marsa is the only one who can triple jump, and her 'Marsa Jump' sends her far up off screen. Used strategically, the players can avoid danger with it.
- Robot C.H.O (ロボット C.H.O.) drawn by Jerry (ジェリー): The game's heavyweight grappler character and a robot who can transform into various metal objects, like a trashcan or a car. The spinning letters on its hand and head will change depending on its actions.
- Beartank (ベアタンク) drawn by Clione (クリオネ): A green bear with tank guns on its head and back, it can change its body into a set of tank treads (leaving only its head exposed) and fire small copies of itself from either gun. For some reason, it is constantly sleeping. It is the speediest character, the second being Captain. Cat. Kit.
- Cools. Roy (クールス・ロイ) drawn by Roy (ロイ): A cowboy-like character who utilizes various western-style attacks and is occasionally aided by his Cactus companion, Alfred (who is also assumed to be a butler of sorts as Alfred refers to him as "Master Cools").
- Mamezo (マメゾ) drawn by Val (バル): A yellow boogeyman-style character with a green cape, his moves are mostly jelly-like transformations into various gadgets and tools (like a fork, an iron, scissors and more) or summon rockets and other things. He is introduced as the main villain in the intro.

=== Hidden characters ===
- Inuzo (イヌゾ) drawn by Mudgas: The game's sub-boss character, it is a palette-swap of Mamezo with a different idle and walking animation but otherwise identical moves.
- Darkness (ダークネス) drawn by George: The game's boss character and a ghost dog with various moves involving morphing itself and spawning objects from its body.

== Reception ==
Reception

Review scores
Publication	Score
Computer and Video Games	3/5
Famitsu	7/10, 6/10, 6/10, 6/10
Hyper	80/100
N64 Magazine	80%
Official Nintendo Magazine	85%
64 Magazine	79%
Arcade	3/5
Gamers' Republic	B
N64 Gamer	8/10
N64 Pro	53%, 65%
Total Control	51/100

Rakugakids did not garner a US release, its European release received a mixed reception from critics. with some criticising the fact that this European version had been poorly converted from the original Japanese game, which had originally played much faster

== Legacy ==
Journalist Steve Merrett cited Konami's Nintendo 64 library as its last set of games that focused on gameplay; games like Rakugakids, International Superstar Soccer 98 (1998), Castlevania (1999), used the Nintendo 64's processing power to add to gameplay tropes previously established in 2D gaming. For Rakugakids, 2D characters fought on a 3D background. The game's formula is also an example of how 2D fighters from companies like Konami, Capcom, and SNK incorporated different methods to stay relevant in a market filled with 3D games.

Some references such as characters and music from Rakugakids were later added to other video games by Konami. In Castlevania: Circle of the Moon, protagonist Nathan Graves can transform into the Beartank character by equipping the Bear Ring and activating the Black Dog and Pluto cards (which normally transforms him into a Skeleton). The playable characters appear as battle cards in Goemon Mononoke Sugoroku. Beartank also appears as a secret character in Konami Krazy Racers. Music from the game also appears in some of Konami's Bemani games, namely Beatmania GB and Pop n' Music.
