= Sugoroku =

Two Japanese board games

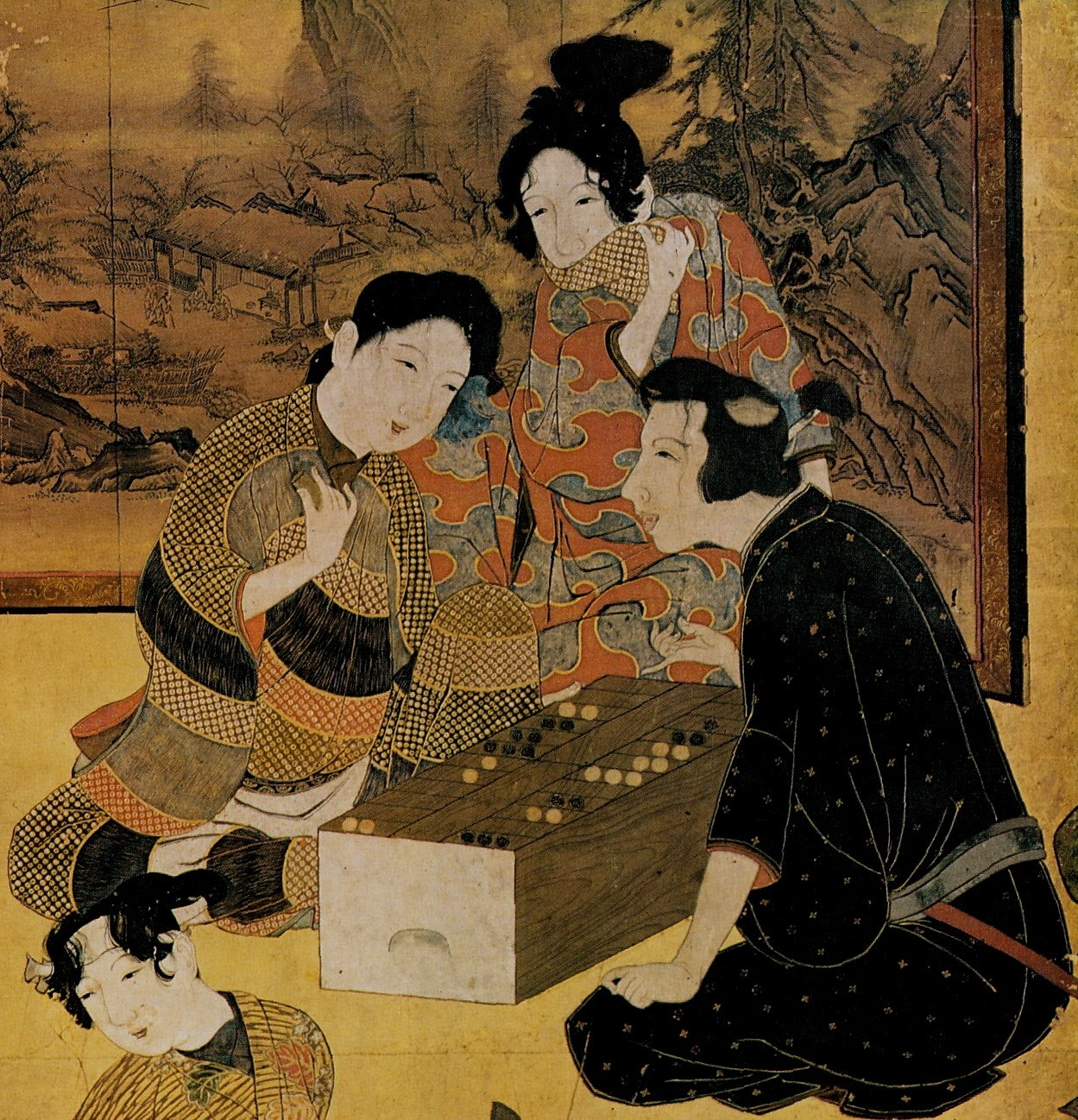
Man and woman playing ban-sugoroku (from Hikone Screen, Hikone Castle Museum)

Sugoroku (雙六 or 双六) (literally 'double six') refers to two different forms of a Japanese board game: e-sugoroku (絵双六, 'picture-sugoroku') which is similar to Western snakes and ladders, and ban-sugoroku (盤双六, 'board-sugoroku') which is similar to western tables games like backgammon. With ban-sugoroku being obsolete, today the word sugoroku almost always means e-sugoroku.

E-sugoroku is popular in Japan through modern printing methods as supplements in boys’, girls’, and women’s magazines, as well as video games.

Tsukiji Sugoroku Museum in Tokyo has a collection of 500 types of sugoroku from the Edo period to the 1950s.

== E-sugoroku ==
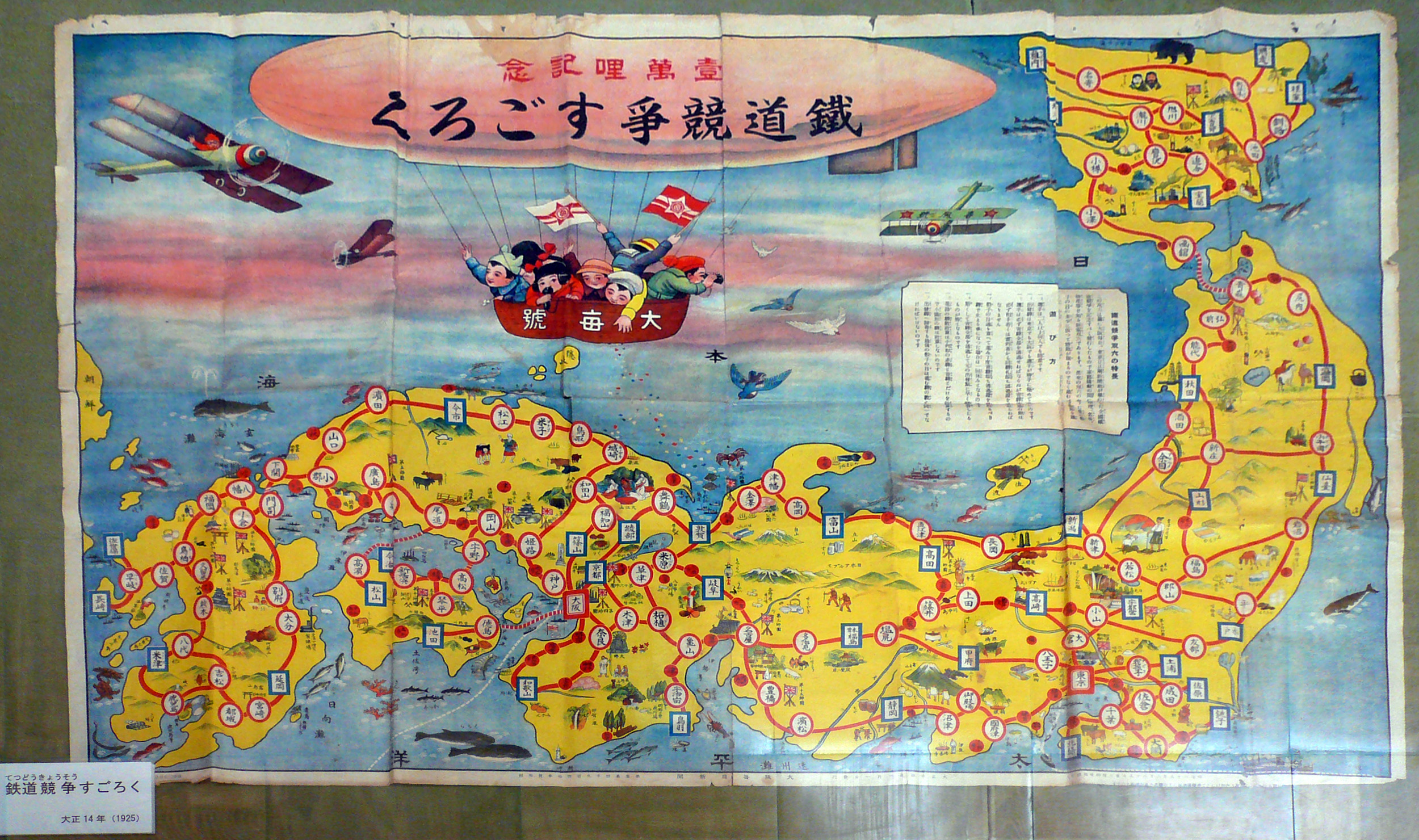
E-Sugoroku (1925)

The simpler e-sugoroku, with rules similar to snakes and ladders, appeared as early as late 13th century. It was made popular due to the elaborate wooden block printing technology, painted by well-known illustrators, of the Edo period. Thousands of variations of boards were made with pictures and themes from religion, political, actors, and even adult material. In the Meiji and later periods, this variation of the game remained popular and was often included in child-oriented magazines. With ban-sugoroku being obsolete, today the word sugoroku almost always means e-sugoroku.

Topics include visiting famous places, people, and social customs. The popularity of these games reflects how the people of Edo had a fascination with the faraway imperial capital of Kyoto and vicinity. Tōkaidō e-sugoroku games usually have their starting line at Nihonbashi in Edo and head west to a finish line in Kyoto.

Intelligent and virtuous women of Japan is another topic of Edo e-sugoroku, with images of things that were considered feminine virtues.

== Ban-sugoroku ==
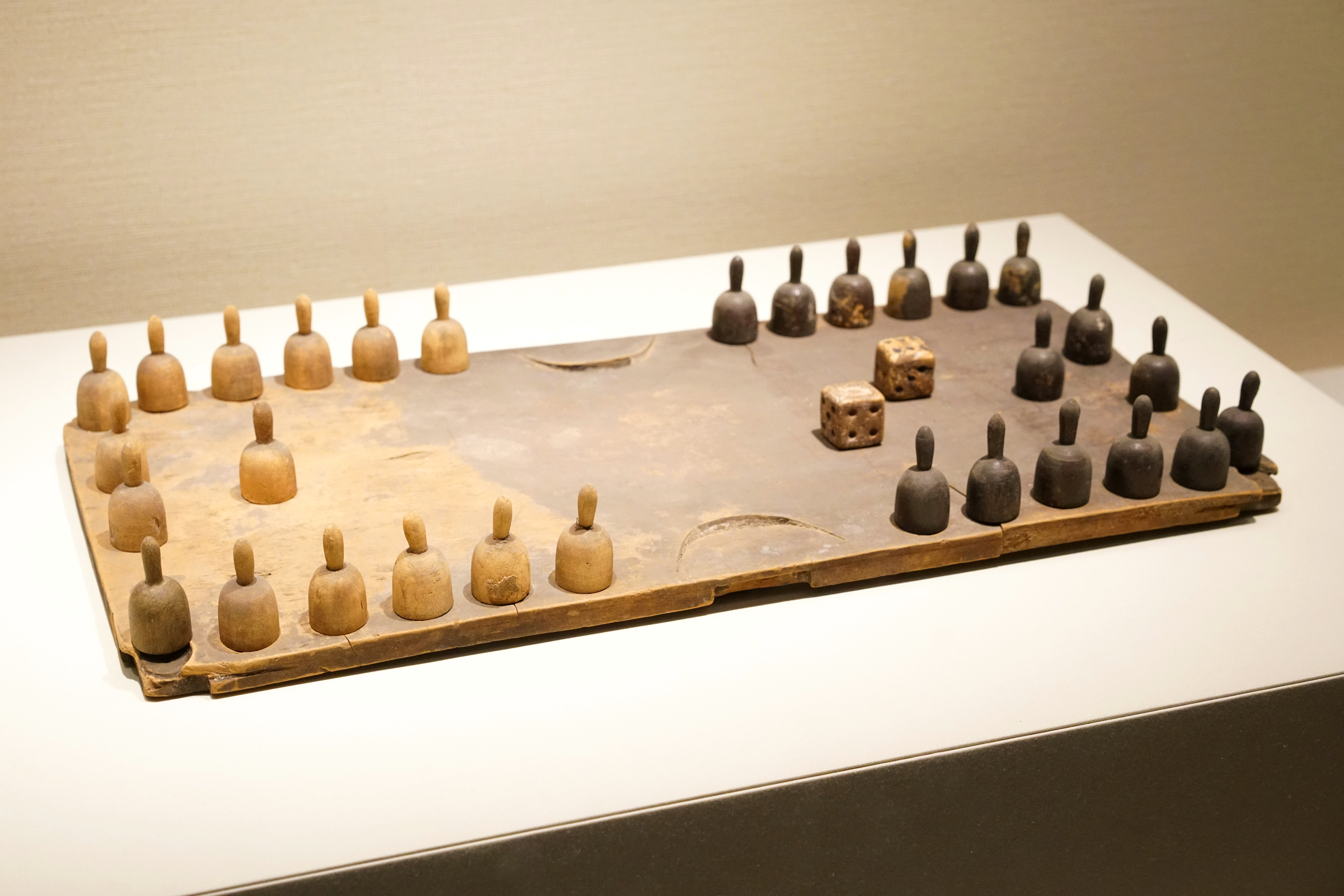
A board and pieces for playing "double six", Liao dynasty

Ban-sugoroku is played in a similar way to western tables games. It has the same starting position as backgammon, but the aim and rules of play are different. For example:

- Doubles are not special. If a player rolls doubles, each die still counts only once.
- There is no "bearing off". The goal is to move all of one's men to within the last six spaces of the board.
- There is no doubling cube.
- "Closing out", that is forming a prime of six contiguous points with one or more of opponent's men on the bar, is an automatic win.

The game is thought to have been introduced from China (where it was known as Shuanglu [雙陸/双陆]) into Japan in the sixth century. The original chinese game is in turn based on the Persian Nard, which is thought to be the ancestor or an old form of backgammon.

It is known that in the centuries following the game's introduction into Japan it was made illegal several times, most prominently in 689 and 754. This is because the simple and luck-based nature of sugoroku made it an ideal gambling game. This version of sugoroku and records of playing for gambling continuously appeared until early Edo era. In early Edo-era, a new and quick gambling game called Chō-han (丁半) appeared and using sugoroku for gambling quickly dwindled.

This variant of the tables family has died out in Japan and most other countries, while the Western style modern backgammon (with doubling-cube) still has some avid players.

== Sugoroku-based video games ==
Many e-sugoroku-based video games were released, including: Kiteretsu Daihyakka: Chōjikū Sugoroku, Sugoroku Ginga Senki, Battle Hunter, Ganbare Goemon: Mononoke Sugoroku, Culdcept, Dokodemo Hamster 4: Doki Doki Sugoroku Daibouken!, Hello Kitty: Minna de Sugoroku, Gotouchi Hello Kitty Sugoroku Monogatari, Yu-Gi-Oh! Sugoroku's Board Game, Family Pirate Party, Hidamari Sketch: Doko Demo Sugoroku x 365, and PictureBook Games: Pop-Up Pursuit.

The Mario Party series can be seen with heavy influences from sugoroku, especially e-sugoroku. Developer Hudson Soft has also produced the Momotaro Dentetsu series of games, which are more directly inspired by sugoroku.

Several of the Dragon Quest games feature a minigame called sugoroku (known as Treasures n' Trapdoors or Pachisi in English localizations) that has players moving along a board with spaces after rolling a 6-sided die.

The video game Eternal Melody is primarily a simulation game with RPG elements, including dungeons. Dungeon exploration plays out as a game of Sugoroku.

The video game Samurai Warriors 2 features a mini-game named Sugoroku, but it bears very little resemblance to traditional Sugoroku. Instead, it plays very much like Itadaki Street, Wily & Right no RockBoard: That's Paradise, or a simplified version of Monopoly: players take turns in moving around a board, the spaces of which are designated as different territories of Japan. By landing on an unoccupied space, the player is able to buy that space for a set amount of money. If one player lands on a space purchased by another, they must pay a fee to that player, or else can choose to challenge the player for control of that space (utilising the main Samurai Warriors 2 game engine for special challenge games). Also present on the board are "Shrine" spaces, which are roughly analogous to Monopoly's Chance and Community Chest spaces.

The survival horror game Kuon features ban-sugoroku as a minigame that can be unlocked.
