= Ganbare Goemon 3: Shishi Jūrokubē no Karakuri Manjigatame =

1994 video game

- Developer: Konami
- Publisher: Konami
- Director: Etsunobu Ebisu
- Producer: Shigeharu Umezaki
- Designer: Koichi Ogawa
- Composers: Kazuhiko Uehara; Yukie Morimoto; Noriko Takahashi
- Series: Ganbare Goemon
- Platform: Super Famicom
- Release: JP: December 16, 1994
- Genre: Action-adventure
- Modes: Single-player, multiplayer

Ganbare Goemon 3: Shishi Jūrokubē no Karakuri Manjigatame (がんばれゴエモン3 獅子重禄兵衛のからくり卍固め lit. "Go For It Goemon 3: Lord Jurokubei's Mechanical Octopus Hold") is an action-adventure game by Konami, which was released for the Super Famicom in 1994.

It is the third game in the Japanese video game series Ganbare Goemon to be released on the Super Famicom, and the sequel to Ganbare Goemon 2: Kiteretsu Shōgun McGuiness, and the ninth mainline installment overall. The game is a top down action adventure that gives the ability to switch characters in order to access different powers. The game was re-released in 2026 via the Ganbare Goemon! Daishūgō compilation.

== Gameplay ==
Gameplay screenshot

Goemon 3 is an action-adventure game with many different play styles, including platforming, 3D chases, one on one fighting, mech sequences and isometric RPG sequences.

== Plot ==
The Wise Old Man has invented a time-traveling device and sent himself into the future. Initially using it for some romantic escapades, he soon faces a problem when Bisumaru, a French-Catholic nun and Ebisumaru's descendant, who hijacks the device. The sinister Juurokubei orders her to wreaks havoc on Japan. Goemon then travels to the futuristic Neo Edo in order to stop her.

== Development and release ==
Ganbare Goemon 3: Shishi Jūrokubē no Karakuri Manjigatame was developed by Konami. An English fan translation was created by DDSTranslation and released in 2020.

== Reception ==
Reception

Review scores
Publication	Score
Consoles +	87%
Famitsu	32/40
Joypad	81%
Official Nintendo Magazine	91%
Total!	1-
Super Power	84%

Nintendo Magazine System described the game as brilliant and original, and as "a must buy for platform fans". Kurt Kalata of Hardcore Gaming 101 described it as a "pretty decent game".

== Sequel ==
A further sequel was released for the Super Famicom, Ganbare Goemon Kirakira Dōchū: Boku ga Dancer ni Natta Wake in 1995.
