= Ganbare Goemon: Kuru Nara Koi! Ayashige Ikka no Kuroi Kage =

1998 video game

- Developer(s): Konami Computer Entertainment Nagoya
- Publisher(s): Konami
- Composer(s): Junko Karashima; Kaoru Okada
- Series: Ganbare Goemon
- Platform(s): PlayStation
- Release: JP: December 23, 1998; JP: July 6, 2000 (Konami the Best)
- Genre(s): Action-adventure
- Mode(s): Single-player

Ganbare Goemon: Kuru Nara Koi! Ayashige Ikka no Kuroi Kage (がんばれゴエモン～来るなら恋! 綾繁一家の黒い影～) is a Ganbare Goemon game released for the PlayStation on December 23, 1998. It was released alongside Goemon's Great Adventure for the Nintendo 64. It was the second game in the series released for the PlayStation and also the second game in 3D, following Mystical Ninja Starring Goemon, and is the fifteenth overall mainline installment.

The game plays from a top-down view, and introduces a kick move to each character's repertoire of techniques.
