= Ganbare Goemon =

Video game series

- Developer: Konami
- Publisher: Konami
- Platforms: Arcade, NES, MSX2, Super NES, Game Boy, PlayStation, Nintendo 64, Game Boy Color, Game Boy Advance, PlayStation 2, Nintendo DS, mobile phone, Wii, Nintendo 3DS, Wii U, Microsoft Windows, Xbox 360, PlayStation 4
- First release: Mr. Goemon; May 1986
- Latest release: Ganbare Goemon Pachisuro 2 September 2011

- Ganbare Goemon – Yukihime Kyūshutsu Emaki

がんばれゴエモンゆき姫救出絵巻
- Manga
- Written by: Hiroshi Obi
- Published by: Kodansha
- Published: December 3, 1991 – August 4, 1992
- Volumes: 3

- Shin Ganbare Goemon: Jigoku-hen

新がんばれゴエモン 地獄編
- Manga
- Written by: Hiroshi Obi
- Published by: Kodansha
- Published: January 5, 1993
- Volumes: 3

- Ganbare Goemon 2 – Kiteretsu Shōgun McGuiness hen

がんばれゴエモン2 奇天烈将軍マッギネス編
- Manga
- Written by: Hiroshi Obi
- Published by: Kodansha
- Published: December 27, 1993
- Volumes: 2

- Ganbare Goemon fever

がんばれゴエモンふぃ～ばあ
- Manga
- Written by: Hiroshi Obi
- Published by: Kodansha
- Published: April 30, 1997
- Volumes: 1

- Ganbare Goemon 3 – Shishi Jūrokubē no Karakuri Manjigatame

がんばれゴエモン3 獅子重禄兵衛のからくり卍固め
- Manga
- Written by: Hiroshi Obi
- Published by: Kodansha
- Published: February 3, 1995 – January 6, 1996
- Volumes: 3

- Ganbare Goemon Kirakira Dōchū

がんばれゴエモンきらきら道中
- Manga
- Written by: Hiroshi Obi
- Published by: Kodansha
- Published: April 30, 1996 – December 4, 1996
- Volumes: 3

- Ganbare Goemon – Neo Momoyama Bakufu no Odori

がんばれゴエモンネオ桃山幕府のおどり
- Manga
- Written by: Hiroshi Obi
- Published by: Kodansha
- Published: February 4, 1998 – October 2, 1998
- Volumes: 3

- Ganbare Goemon – Yukihime Kyūshutsu Emaki

がんばれゴエモンゆき姫救出絵巻
- Manga
- Written by: Hiroshi Obi
- Published by: KC Derakkusu
- Published: November 21, 2013
- Volumes: 1

Ganbare Goemon (がんばれゴエモン; "Go for it, Goemon!"), known as Goemon and Mystical Ninja internationally, is a video game series created and produced by Konami. Etsunobu Ebisu was the joint producer of the franchise.

These games revolve around the main character, Goemon, and his exploits. The games are notable for their humorous tone and parodies of many aspects of pop culture, as well as of other video games. The main character is loosely based on Ishikawa Goemon, the noble thief of Japanese folklore. While the early games emphasized Goemon as a noble thief, he eventually becomes more of a standard video game hero character. His trademarks are his blue bushy hair and weapon of choice, the kiseru. The games are set in a cartoonlike, mystical Feudal Japan, with many references to Japanese folklore. Although the series has its roots in action-adventure, the Ganbare Goemon series has features from genres including role-playing, puzzle video games and board games. Ganbare Goemon is popular in Japan. The series consists of video games, with its success spawning a wide series of merchandise and an anime and manga series.

Konami has generally regarded the Goemon games as too specific to the Japanese market to be released worldwide, but five of them have been released overseas: The Legend of the Mystical Ninja for the Super NES, Mystical Ninja Starring Goemon and Goemon's Great Adventure for the Nintendo 64 and two titles for the Game Boy.

In 2002–03, a mobile phone was released for the titled Ganbare Goemon: Tsūkai Game Apli series.

The latest original game of the series was Ganbare Goemon: Tōkai Dōchū Ōedo Tengu ri Kaeshi no Maki, released in Japan for the Nintendo DS in 2005. Since then, the series has been used primarily as themes for Konami's pachislot machines. A compilation of earlier releases, Ganbare Goemon! Daishūgō, is set for release in 2026.

The series is represented in Super Smash Bros. Ultimate with a purchasable Goemon costume for Mii fighters.

On March 27, 2026, Konami Digital Entertainment held the Ganbare Goemon Lottery, a lottery sale to commemorate the series' 40th anniversary. The lottery sale offered a chance to win Ganbare Goemon items featuring numerous original illustrations, as well as special postcards as bonus gifts.

== Related media ==
=== Anime ===
==== Original video animation ====
- A single-episode thirty-minute OVA was released in Japan in 1993 titled Ganbare Goemon: Jigenjō no Akumu (がんばれゴエモン 次元城の悪夢; "Ganbare Goemon: The Nightmare of the Dimensional Castle"). The OVA starred the voice of Daiki Nakamura as Goemon and Hideyuki Umezu as Ebisumaru and featured segments parodying Gradius, Akumajō Dracula and TwinBee.
- A second-episode thirty-minute OVA was released in Japan in 1998 titled Ganbare Goemon: Chikyū Kyūshutsu Sakusen (がんばれゴエモン地球救出作戦; "Ganbare Goemon: Global Rescue Operation").

=== Manga ===
Goemon is the protagonist of many manga based on the video game series. There are several series, each one based on a different game. Most of the manga were illustrated by artist Hiroshi Obi and were published between 1991 and 1998 to accompany the release of each new game.

Obi died from a brain stem hemorrhage on August 3, 2014, at the age of 54.

The manga was digitally re-released in Japan on February 8, 2024.

== List of games ==
=== Video games (main series) ===
Original title	Localized title(s)	Regions	First release	First platform	Additional platform(s)
Mr. Goemon	—N/a	JP	1986	Arcade	
Ganbare Goemon! Karakuri Dōchū	—N/a	JP	1986	Famicom	MSX2, Mobile phones
Ganbare Goemon 2	—N/a	JP	1989	Famicom	i-revo, Wii VC, 3DS VC, Wii U VC
Ganbare Goemon Gaiden: Kieta Ōgon Kiseru	—N/a	JP	1990	Famicom	Wii VC, 3DS VC, Mobile phones
Ganbare Goemon: Yukihime Kyūshutsu Emaki	The Legend of the Mystical Ninja	JP, NA, EUR	1991	SNES	Wii VC, Wii U VC, Nintendo Classic Mini: Super Famicom
Ganbare Goemon: Sarawareta Ebisumaru!	Mystical Ninja Starring Goemon (in Konami GB Collection Vol.3)	JP, EUR	1991	Game Boy	3DS VC
Ganbare Goemon Gaiden 2: Tenka no Zaihō	—N/a	JP	1992	Famicom	
Ganbare Goemon 2: Kiteretsu Shōgun McGuiness	—N/a	JP	1993	Super Famicom	
Ganbare Goemon 3: Shishi Jūrokubē no Karakuri Manjigatame	—N/a	JP	1994	Super Famicom	Wii VC, Wii U VC
Ganbare Goemon Kirakira Dōchū: Boku ga Dancer ni Natta Wake	—N/a	JP	1995	Super Famicom	
Ganbare Goemon: Uchū Kaizoku Akogingu	—N/a	JP	1996	PlayStation	PlayStation Network
Ganbare Goemon: Neo Momoyama Bakufu no Odori	Mystical Ninja Starring Goemon	JP, NA, EUR	1997	Nintendo 64	
Ganbare Goemon: Kurofune Tō no Nazo	Mystical Ninja Starring Goemon	JP, NA, EUR	1997	Game Boy	3DS VC
Ganbare Goemon: Derodero Dōchū Obake Tenkomori	Goemon's Great Adventure (NA); Mystical Ninja 2 Starring Goemon (EUR)	JP, NA, EUR	1998	Nintendo 64	
Ganbare Goemon: Kuru Nara Koi! Ayashige Ikka no Kuroi Kage	—N/a	JP	1998	PlayStation	
Ganbare Goemon: Tengu-tō no Gyakushū!	—N/a	JP	1999	Game Boy Color	
Ganbare Goemon: Mononoke Dōchū Tobidase Nabe-Bugyō!	—N/a	JP	1999	Game Boy Color	
Ganbare Goemon: Seikūshi Dynamites Arawaru!!	—N/a	JP	2000	Game Boy Color	
Ganbare Goemon: Ōedo Daikaiten	—N/a	JP	2001	PlayStation	
Mini Kyodai Robo Goemon Compact	—N/a	JP	2003	Mobile phone	
Kessakusen! Ganbare Goemon 1 & 2 (port of the first two Super Famicom games with extra mini-games)	—N/a	JP	2005	Game Boy Advance	
Ganbare Goemon: Shishijūrokubē no Karakuri Manji Gatame	—N/a	JP	2005	Mobile phone	
Ganbare Goemon: Tōkai Dōchū Ōedo Tengu ri Kaeshi no Maki	—N/a	JP	2005	Nintendo DS	

=== Video games (spin-offs) ===
Original title	Localized title(s)	Regions	First release	First platform
Ganbare Goemon: Ebisumaru Kiki Ippatsu	—N/a	JP	1990	Handheld electronic game
Soreyuke Ebisumaru! Karakuri Meiro – Kieta Goemon no Nazo!! (puzzle game starring Ebisumaru)	—N/a	JP	1996	Super Famicom
Goemon Mononoke Sugoroku (Sugoroku game)	—N/a	JP	1999	Nintendo 64
Bōken Jidai Katsugeki Goemon (a more serious spin-off of the series)	Mystical Ninja Goemon Zero (unreleased)	JP	2000	PlayStation 2
Goemon: Shin Sedai Shūmei! (futuristic spin-off of the series)	—N/a	JP	2001	PlayStation
Goemon: New Age Shutsudō! (futuristic spin-off of the series)	—N/a	JP	2002	Game Boy Advance
Ganbare Goemon: Tsūkai Game Apli series Dosukoi! Harite Ichiban Hijutsu! Sansū Juku Jetto GO! GO! GO! Karakuri Kiteretsu Rēsu Tentekomai-Mai Meikyū-Kan	—N/a	JP	2002–2003	Mobile phones
Ganbare Goemon! Daishūgō (compilation of all Famicom, Super Famicom, Game Boy, and Game Boy Color games)	—N/a	JP	2026	Nintendo Switch; PlayStation 5 Windows

=== Other games ===
Original title	Localized title(s)	Regions	First release	First platform
Ganbare Goemon! Karakuri Dōchū: Machi Hen	—N/a	JP	1986	Board game
Ganbare Goemon (medal game)	—N/a	JP	1997	Medal game
Ganbare Goemon Pachisuro	—N/a	JP	2009	Pachislot
Ganbare Goemon Pachisuro 2	—N/a	JP	2011	Pachislot
