= Ganbare Goemon! Karakuri Dōchū =

1986 video game

- Family Computer cover art
- Developer: Konami
- Publishers: Konami; Nintendo (GBA)
- Designer: Kazuhisa Hashimoto
- Programmers: Shigeharu Umezaki; Kazuhiro Aoyama
- Composers: Satoe Terashima; Michiru Yamane (Ganbare Goemon 2)
- Series: Ganbare Goemon
- Platforms: Family Computer, MSX, Game Boy Advance
- Release: July 30, 1986: Famicom/NES July 30, 1986 MSX2 July 30, 1987 Game Boy Advance May 21, 2004 Wii Virtual Console November 6, 2007 3DS Virtual Console March 6, 2013 Wii U Virtual Console July 2, 2014 (FC) February 25, 2015 (MSX2)
- Genre: Action-adventure
- Modes: Single-player, multiplayer (MSX2)

Ganbare Goemon! Karakuri Dōchū is a video game produced by Konami. It is the second game in the Ganbare Goemon series (sometimes known in English as Mystical Ninja) and the first to be released on a video game console and home computer. It was initially released for the Family Computer on July 30, 1986 and later released for the MSX2 a year later. The Famicom version was re-released in Japan only for the Game Boy Advance under the Famicom Mini label and for the Wii, Nintendo 3DS and Wii U under the Virtual Console service. The game is set to be re-released in 2026 via the Ganbare Goemon! Daishūgō compilation. A direct sequel, Ganbare Goemon 2, was released for the Famicom on January 4, 1989.

== Gameplay ==
The game revolves around the main character, Goemon, and his exploits. As the name suggests, his character was based on Ishikawa Goemon, the noble thief of Japanese folklore. Unlike its sequels, this game still doesn't feature the comic situation and strange characters that define the series, and Goemon is portrayed as a noble thief rather than a plain hero.

The game plays as a top view action/adventure game (similar to The Legend of Zelda) though it is separated by stages. In each level, Goemon must find three passes in order to advance. Some of these passes are found in boxes, secret passages or can be bought. The player will be presented with a new Japanese province (there are eight altogether) after completing all the stages, but the levels will stay the same. The ending, however, will be different.

Like the rest of the series, Goemon can be powered-up if certain items are found and/or bought, which can be lost after a few hits.

The MSX version has the option to be played in turns by two players, with the second player playing as a ninja named Nezumi Kozō, which is the basis of Goemon's sidekick Ebisumaru. In addition, unlike the Family Computer version, the game has six more provinces with completely new levels after finishing the game once.
