= Anime Ganbare Goemon =

Japanese anime television series

- VHS cover

アニメがんばれゴエモン
- Genre: Adventure, science fiction
- Anime television series
- Directed by: Katsuyoshi Yatabe
- Produced by: Koki Matsura
- Written by: Yasushi Hirano
- Music by: Yasunori Tsuchida
- Studio: Trans Arts
- Licensed by: NA: ADV Films
- Original network: TBS
- Original run: October 4, 1997 – March 28, 1998
- Episodes: 23

Anime Ganbare Goemon (アニメがんばれゴエモン, Anime Ganbare Goemon) is an anime television series, based on Konami's best-selling video game franchise Ganbare Goemon. The television series was produced by Trans Arts, aired from 1997 to 1998, ran for 23 episodes, and 5 volumes of videos were released on VHS and DVD. It was eventually picked up in North America for an English dub done by ADV Films under the name Legend of the Mystical Ninja.

== Plot ==
The Demon Lord Makamuge intends to conquer both the game world and the real world, and is up to Goemon and his friends to prevent this from happening.

== Characters ==
=== Recurring ===
Goemon
Voiced by: Yasunori Matsumoto (Japanese); Vic Mignogna (English)
Ebisumaru
Voiced by: Kenichi Ogata (Japanese); Chris Patton (English)
Sasuke
Voiced by: Chika Sakamoto (Japanese); Greg Ayres (English)
Yae (ヤエ)
Voiced by: Aya Hisakawa (Japanese); Jessica Boone (English)
Omitsu
Voiced by: Sakura Tange (Japanese); Kira Vincent-Davis (English)

=== Original ===
Tsukasa Ishikawa (石川 ツカサ, Ishikawa Tsukasa)
Voiced by: Tomoko Kojima (Japanese); Tiffany Grant (English)
Junichiro Ishikawa (石川 純一郎, Ishikawa Jun'ichirō)
Voiced by: Isshin Chiba (Japanese); Andy McAvin (English)
Yoko Ishikawa (石川 洋子, Ishikawa Yoko)
Voiced by: Michiko Neya (Japanese); Lorinda Boyd (English)
Itakaro (イタカロー, Itakarō)
Voiced by: Isshin Chiba (Japanese); Chris Patton (English)
Doctor Mudanashi (ドクタームダナシ, Dokutā Mudanashi)
Voiced by: Kazumi Tanaka (Japanese); David Born (English)
Seppukumaru (セップク丸, Seppukumaru)
Voiced by: Toshiyuki Morikawa (Japanese); David Born (English)
Goemon Impact (ゴエモン・インパクト, Goemon Inpakuto)
Voiced by: Kentarō Itō (Japanese); George Manley (English)
Hatarino (ハッタリーノ, Hatarino)
Voiced by: Masato Amada (Japanese); Greg Ayres (English)
Asuka Tsuchiya (土屋 明日香, Tsuchiya Asuka)
Voiced by: Kyōko Hikami (Japanese); Hilary Haag (English)
Monoshirinosuke Momochi (百地 物知介, Momochi Monoshirinosuke)
Voiced by: Jun'ichi Sugawara (Japanese); Jim McClellan (English)
Noboru Mejirodai (目白台 ノボル, Mejirodai Noboru)
Voiced by: Yoshinori Fujita (Japanese); Kevin Corn (English)
Nyanko (ニャンコ, Nyanko)
Voiced by: Kumi Sakuma (Japanese); Monica Rial (English)
Rokudenashi (ロクデーナシ, Rokudenashi)
Voiced by: Yuri Shiratori (Japanese); Patricia Duran (English)
Tomoe Nishimura (西村 知笑, Nishimura Tomoe)
Voiced by: Kumi Sakuma (Japanese); Patricia Duran (English)
Makuamuge (マクアムーゲ, Makuamūge)
Voiced by: Masaki Aizawa (Japanese); Rick Pearsall (English)
Mama Mejirodai (目白台 ママ, Mejirodai Mama)
Voiced by: Chika Sakamoto (Japanese); Shelley Calene-Black (English)

== Production ==
The 1997 anime features Goemon, the main character in Konami's video game franchise Ganbare Goemon, being pulled "from his magical medieval world to become a superhero on Earth". It was directed by Shigeru Omachi and Katsuyoshi Yatabe. Goemon had been previously featured in the 1991 OVA GFIG: Nightmare Dimension. After the television series, Goemon then appeared in the "short movie" GFIG: Battle to Rescue Earth (1998).

| Preceded by Kiko-chan's Smile (10/5/1996 - 9/27/1997) | TBS Saturday 17:00 Timeframe Anime Ganbare Goemon (October 4, 1997 - March 28, 1998) | Succeeded by Cyber Team in Akihabara (4/4/1998- 9/26/1998) |
