= Zen: Intergalactic Ninja (video game) =

1993 video game

- Developer: Konami
- Publisher: Konami
- Platforms: NES, Game Boy
- Genre: Action

Zen: Intergalactic Ninja is a 1993 video game from Konami. The game is based on the fictional character of the same name.

== Gameplay ==
In Zen: Intergalactic Ninja, players step into the sleek airboots of Zen, an alien superhero turned eco-warrior, on a mission to save Earth from the vile Lord Contaminous—a villain born from generations of pollution and sludge. Originally dispatched to retrieve a buried geocrystal, Zen finds himself embroiled in a larger battle when Contaminous seeks to destroy the crystal and doom the planet to environmental ruin. Joined by Jeremy Baker, Earth's destined "starchild," and the Recycled Heroes, Zen fights through twelve levels. Gameplay spans four major disaster zones: rescuing flora from acid rain, battling Sulfura's toxic venom, extinguishing fires on an oil rig overrun by Oil Slick, and navigating a plutonium mine to confront Garbageman's gaseous minions. Players also face Smogger in a toxic industrial plant, recycle in bonus rounds, and progress through rescue stages and sub-games leading to a final showdown with Lord Contaminous. The design features a three-quarter 3D view and multidirectional scrolling, with adjustable difficulty and extra lives to accommodate players of all skill levels. The game's environmental themes are woven into its mechanics.

== Plot ==
Zen fights an alien villain known as Lord Contaminous, who is keen on harming the Earth's ecological environment.

== Reception ==
Reception

Review scores
Publication	Score
Fort Worth Star-Telegram	8/10(Game Boy)
Game Informer	7.75/10(NES)
Power Unlimited	90/100(Game Boy)
Paisley Daily Express	13/20(Game Boy)

Paisley Daily Express gave the game a score of 13 out of 20, stating: "It plays nicely enough and looks all right, but there's nothing new here" Power Unlimited gave a review score of 90% writing: "Zen is one of the best platform games for the Game Boy. There are versatile locations, many different enemies and cool action. The game's environmentally conscious theme also obliges you to recycle your Game Boy's spent batteries."

== Bibliography ==
- Scullion, Chris (2019). The NES Encyclopedia: Every Game Released for the Nintendo Entertainment System. Pen and Sword Books. ISBN 978-1526737793.
