= Ganbare Goemon Kirakira Dōchū: Boku ga Dancer ni Natta Wake =

1995 video game

- Developer: Konami
- Publisher: Konami
- Series: Ganbare Goemon
- Platform: Super Famicom
- Release: JP: December 22, 1995
- Genre: Action-adventure
- Modes: Single-player, multiplayer

Ganbare Goemon Kirakira Dōchū: Boku ga Dancer ni Natta Wake (がんばれゴエモン きらきら道中〜僕がダンサーになった理由〜 lit. "Go For It Goemon The Sparkling Journey: The Reason I Became a Dancer") is an action-adventure game by Konami, which was released for the Super Famicom in 1995.

It is the fourth and final game in the Japanese video game series Ganbare Goemon to be released on the Super Famicom, the tenth mainline installment overall, and the sequel to Ganbare Goemon 3: Shishi Jūrokubē no Karakuri Manjigatame. The game was re-released in 2026 via the Ganbare Goemon! Daishūgō compilation.

== Gameplay ==
Gameplay screenshot

Like its predecessor Goemon 3, it also has a stage select screen. Each character starts off marooned on their own planet, which they must conquer individually before being able to reunite as a team. There are not as many levels as Goemon 3, but there are also town areas with mini puzzles to solve. Unlike its predecessors, there are no longer any first person Impact fights, but each boss has a mini game (which can be played with up to 4 players), including Konami's puzzle game Taisen Puzzle-Dama. Another mini game is the bungee jump game where Impact has to catch the sword of an enemy mecha bungee jumper. A remake of Time Pilot is also playable in the game after all other secrets have been unlocked.

== Plot ==
Goemon Impact arrives on a planet where its inhabitants look the same as him. They mistake him for their leader and start worshipping him. The planet is then attacked by Harakiri Seppukumaru. Goemon Impact then flies his friends to the planet in order to save his newfound followers.

== Reception ==
Reception

Review scores
Publication	Score
Consoles +	87%
Famitsu	28/40
Official Nintendo Magazine	84%
Super Console	91%
Family Computer Magazine	23.3/30

Kurt Kalata of Hardcore Gaming 101 described the game as "the best of all of the Mystical Ninja games" with excellent graphics and sound quality.

Panda of Consoles + described it as a fun game with all the ingredients from the previous games of the series that made it successful, with the addition of a fun 2 player mode, but a second opinion given by Niico in the same review said that the game was not of the quality of Donkey Kong Country 2 or Super Mario World, and that it lacked inspiration and was hurt by platforming sections that required millimeter precision. He also said that fans of the series would like the game, but he personally had thrown in the towel and was not impressed.

Nintendo Magazine System described it as "a good game that's let down by a too easy difficulty setting".
