= Ganbare Goemon: Tōkai Dōchū Ōedo Tengu ri Kaeshi no Maki =

2005 video game

Ganbare Goemon: Tōkaidōchū Ōedo Tengurikaeshi no Maki
- Developer(s): Konami Computer Entertainment Osaka
- Publisher(s): Konami
- Series: Ganbare Goemon
- Platform(s): Nintendo DS
- Release: JP: June 23, 2005
- Genre(s): Action-adventure
- Mode(s): Single-player

Ganbare Goemon: Tōkaidōchū Ōedo Tengurikaeshi no Maki (がんばれゴエモン～東海道中 大江戸天狗り返しの巻～, lit. "Tokai Dochu Oedo Tengu Return Volume") is the twentieth (excluding the mobile games) and latest Ganbare Goemon game, released for the Nintendo DS on June 23, 2005. Its release marked the revival of the series' medieval Japanese themes and quirky humor, as previous games had taken place in a futuristic setting or with a more serious tone.

== Plot ==
Disaster strikes when Goemon and Ebisumaru are sent to jail for crimes they didn't commit. After being freed from jail by their female companion Yae, they soon discover that poor-looking phonies are causing mischief under their names. They must stop these impostors to clear their name and save Edo from disaster.
