= Goemon Mononoke Sugoroku =

1999 video game

Goemon: Mononoke Sugoroku
- Developer(s): Konami Computer Entertainment Kobe
- Publisher(s): Konami
- Director(s): Koji Yoshida
- Producer(s): Etsunobu Ebisu
- Composer(s): Kozo Nakamura; Tomoaki Hirono; Takeshi Iwakiri; Hajime Takai
- Series: Ganbare Goemon
- Platform(s): Nintendo 64
- Release: JP: December 25, 1999
- Genre(s): Board game
- Mode(s): Single-player, multiplayer

Goemon: Mononoke Sugoroku (ゴエモンもののけ双六(すごろく), lit. "Goemon Sugoroku of Mononoke") is a video game for the Nintendo 64, released by Konami in 1999. It is the third Ganbare Goemon game released for the Nintendo 64, and the only one of the three to not be released outside of Japan.

The game is based on the Japanese board game Sugoroku, with added combat and card play elements. The game is played on pre-rendered boards that resemble previous locations in the Ganbare Goemon series, and features various series mainstays as playable characters, including Goemon, Ebisumaru, Sasuke, Yae, and others.

The game features Yae's new outfit that would be used in subsequent titles. In addition, characters from Rakugakids were added as battlecards.
