= List of Konami games =

The following is a list of games either developed or published by Konami.

== Arcade ==
=== 1977–1989 ===
1977
- Block Yard (released by Leijac)
1978
- Block Invader (released by Leijac)
- Destroyer (released by Leijac)
- Super Destroyer (released by Leijac)
- Breaker (released by Leijac)
1979
- Car Chase (Head On clone, released by Leijac)
- Astro Invader (Kamikaze in Japan, released by Leijac (JP) and Stern (NA))
- Space King (Space Invaders clone, released by Leijac)
- Space King 2 (Space Invaders Part II clone, released by Leijac)
- Rich Man (Gee Bee clone, released by Leijac)
- Space Ship (Star Fire clone, released by Leijac)
- Space War (Intruder in North America, Space Laser in Europe, released by Leijac (JP), Game Plan (NA), and Taito (EU))
1980
- Maze (released by Leijac)
1981
- Barian (released by Leijac)
- The End (released by Leijac (JP) and Stern (NA))
- Amidar (released by Leijac (JP) and Stern (NA))
- Frogger (released by Sega)
- Jungler (released by Stern (NA))
- Scramble (released by Leijac (JP) and Stern (NA))
- Strategy X
- Super Cobra (released by Leijac (JP) and Stern (NA))
- Tactician (released by Sega)
- Turtles (released by Sega (JP) and Stern (NA))
- Ultra Dome (possibly unreleased)
- Video Hustler (also known as Lil' Hustler, released by Leijac (JP) and Dynamo (NA))
1982
- Guttang Gottong (released by Centuri in North America)
- Pooyan (released by Stern in North America)
- Time Pilot (released by Centuri in North America)
- Tutankham (released by Stern in North America)
1983
- Gyruss (released by Centuri in North America)
- Juno First (released by Gottlieb in North America)
- Mega Zone (released by Interlogic in North America)
- Roc 'N Rope (released by Interlogic in North America)
- Track & Field (Hyper Olympic outside North America, released by Centuri in North America)
- Q*bert (Japan; licensed from Gottlieb)
1984
- Badlands (released by Centuri in North America)
- Circus Charlie (released by Centuri in North America)
- Hyper Sports (Hyper Olympic '84 in Japan, released by Centuri in North America)
- Mikie (released by Centuri in North America)
- Pandora's Palace (released by Interlogic in North America)
- Max Mile
- Road Fighter
- Super Basketball
- Time Pilot '84
1985
- Finalizer
- Galactic Warriors
- Gradius (Nemesis outside Japan)
- Konami GT
- Konami's Ping Pong
- Rush'n Attack (Green Beret in Japan and Europe)
- Scooter Shooter
- Shao-Lin's Road (Kicker in Europe)
- Twinbee
- Wiz Quiz
- Yie Ar Kung Fu
1986
- Double Dribble
- Mr. Goemon
- V. Gradius (released by Nintendo)
- Iron Horse
- Jackal aka Top Gunner
- Jail Break
- Rock'n Rage
- Salamander
- WEC Le Mans
- VS. The Goonies (released by Nintendo)
1987
- Battlantis
- Black Panther (B.A.W.)
- Blades of Steel
- VS. Castlevania (released by Nintendo)
- City Bomber
- Combat School (Boot Camp)
- Contra (Gryzor in Europe)
- Dark Adventure (Devil World in Europe, not to be confused with Nintendo's Japan/PAL-only Famicom/NES game)
- Fast Lane
- Hyper Crash
- Labyrinth Runner
- MX5000
- Rack 'Em Up (The Hustler)
- Typhoon (Ajax)
1988
- Super Contra
- Haunted Castle (Akumajō Dracula in Japan)
- Chequered Flag (also known as Checkered Flag)
- Devastators (Garuka in Japan)
- The Main Event
- The Final Round
- Thunder Cross
- Kitten Kaboodle
- Hot Chase
- Gangbusters
- Konami '88 (Hyper Sports Special in Japan; '88 Games in North America)
- Gradius II (Vulcan Venture outside Japan)
- VS. Top Gun
1989
- Teenage Mutant Ninja Turtles
- Gradius III
- M.I.A.
- Bottom of the Ninth
- Crime Fighters
- S. P. Y. – Special Project Y
- Cue Brick
- Block Hole

=== 1990–1999 ===
1990
- Aliens
- Lightning Fighters
- Punk Shot
- Over Drive
- Surprise Attack
- Parodius Da!
1991
- Teenage Mutant Ninja Turtles: Turtles in Time
- The Simpsons
- Sunset Riders
- Roller Games
- Golfing Greats
- Thunder Cross II
- Vendetta
- Detana!! Twinbee
- Escape Kids
- Xexex
- Pit-Fighter (Japan; licensed from Atari Games)
1992
- X-Men
- Lethal Enforcers
- G.I. Joe
- Bucky O'Hare
- Asterix
- Hexion
- Potrio
- Wild West C.O.W.-Boys of Moo Mesa
1993
- Run'n Gun (Run and Gun)
- Martial Champions
- Metamorphic Force
- Monster Maulers
- Mystic Warriors
- Violent Storm
- Polygonet Commanders (Poly-Net Warriors, multiplayer 3D polygon first-person shooter)
- Premier Soccer
- Gaiapolis
1994
- Brain Busters (Prototype of what became Monster Maulers)
- Racing Force
- Gokujō Parodius (Fantastic Journey)
- Lethal Enforcers II: Gunfighters
- Quiz Do Re Mi Fa Grand Prix
- Taisen Puzzle-dama
1995
- Dragoon Might
- Midnight Run: Road Fighter 2
- Crypt Killer
- Pirate Ship (redemption game)
- Road Rage (motion cabinet; released as Speed King in Japan)
- Five A Side Soccer
- Ultra Hockey
- Quiz Do Re Mi Fa Grand Prix 2
- Tokimeki Memorial Taisen Puzzle-Dama
- TwinBee Yahho!
- Hole in One
1996
- Beat the Champ
- Bishi Bashi Champ Mini Game Senshuken
- Daisu-Kiss
- Hyper Athlete
- Konami's Open Golf Championship
- Powerful Baseball '96
- Run And Gun 2
- Salamander 2
- Sexy Parodius
- Susume! Taisen Puzzle Dama
- Taisen Tokkae dama
- Vs. Net Soccer
- Wave Shark
- Winding Heat
- GTI Club
1997
- Battle Vision
- Beatmania
- Dead Eye
- Fighting Bujutsu (Fighting Wushu)
- Hang Pilot
- Nagano Winter Olympics '98
- Operation Thunder Hurricane
- Polystars
- Poy Poy
- Racing Jam
- Rushing Heroes
- Solar Assault
- Solar Assault: Revised
- Tokimeki Memorial Oshiete Your Heart
- Total Vice
- Wedding Rhapsody
- Winning Spike
1998
- Bass Angler
- Battle Tryst
- Beatmania 2ndMix
- Beatmania 3rdMix
- Beatstage
- Dance Dance Revolution (Japanese release)
- Dark Horse Legend
- Evil Night
- Fisherman's Bait Kit
- Fisherman's Bait 2
- Handle Champ
- Heat Of Eleven '98
- HipHopMania
- Jikkyō Powerful Pro Baseball EX
- NBA Play By Play
- Pop'n Music
- Racing Jam: Chapter 2
- Rushing Heroes Football
- Super Bishi Bashi Champ
- Teraburst
- Thrill Drive
1999
- Beatmania 4thMix The Beat Goes On
- Beatmania 5thMix Time to Get Down
- Beatmania Complete Mix (HipHopMania Complete Mix in North America; Beatstage Complete Mix in Korea)
- Beatmania IIDX
- Beatmania IIDX 2nd Style
- Beatmania IIDX Club Version
- Beatmania IIDX Substream
- Dance Dance Revolution (Asian release)
- Dance Dance Revolution (North American release)
- Dance Dance Revolution 2nd Mix
- Dance Dance Revolution 2ndMix with Beatmania IIDX Club Version
- Dance Dance Revolution 2ndMix Link Version
- Dance Dance Revolution 2ndMix and Beatmania IIDX Substream Club Version
- Dance Dance Revolution 3rdMix (Asian release)
- Dance Dance Revolution 3rdMix (Japanese release)
- Dance Dance Revolution Karaoke Mix
- Dancing Stage (European version of Dance Dance Revolution)
- Dancing Stage (re-release)
- Dancing Stage EuroMix
- Dancing Stage featuring Dreams Come True
- Dancing Stage featuring True Kiss Destination (Asian release)
- Dancing Stage featuring True Kiss Destination (Japanese release)
- Dark Horse Legend 2
- DrumMania
- Fisherman's Bait Marlin Challenge
- Gachaga Champ
- Gradius IV
- GuitarFreaks
- GuitarFreaks 2ndMix
- Hyper Bishi Bashi Champ
- Pop'n Music 2
- Pop'n Music 3
- Pop'n Stage
- Pop'n Stage EX
- Silent Scope
- Step Champ

=== 2000–2009 ===
2000
- Anime Champ
- Beatmania Complete Mix 2 (HipHopMania Complete Mix 2 in North America; Beatstage Complete Mix 2 in Korea)
- Beatmania Core Remix
- Beatmania Club Mix
- Beatmania featuring Dreams Come True
- Beatmania IIDX 3rd Style
- Beatmania IIDX 4th Style
- Beatmania III
- Beatmania III Append Core Remix
- Code One Dispatch
- Dance Dance Revolution 3rdMix (Korean release)
- Dance Dance Revolution 3rdMix (Korean re-release)
- Dance Dance Revolution 3rdMix Plus
- Dance Dance Revolution 4thMix (Japanese release)
- Dance Dance Revolution 4thMix Plus (Asian release)
- Dance Dance Revolution 4thMix Plus (Japanese release)
- Dance Dance Revolution 4thMix (Asian release)
- Dance Dance Revolution Karaoke Mix 2nd
- Dance Dance Revolution Kids
- Dance Dance Revolution USA
- Dancing Stage featuring Disney's Rave
- DanceManiax 1stMix
- DanceManiax 2ndMix
- DrumMania 2ndMix
- DrumMania 3rdMix
- GuitarFreaks 3rdMix
- GuitarFreaks 4thMix
- Keyboardmania (also known as Keyboard Heaven)
- Keyboardmania 2ndMix
- ParaParaParadise (also known as ParaParaDancing)
- ParaParaParadise 1stMix Plus
- Pop'n Music 4
- Pop'n Music 5
- Pop'n Music Animelo
- Pop'n Music Mickey Tunes
- Punch Mania: Hokuto No Ken (Fighting Mania outside Japan)
- Silent Scope 2: Dark Silhouette (Innocent Sweeper in Japan; Fatal Judgement in other countries)
- Simpsons Bowling
2001
- Beatmania 6thMix The UK Underground Music
- Beatmania IIDX 5th Style
- Beatmania IIDX 6th Style
- Beatmania III Append 6th Mix
- Boxing Mania: Ashita no Joe
- Dance Dance Revolution 5thMix
- DanceManiax 2ndMix Append JParadise
- DDRMAX Dance Dance Revolution 6thMix
- Driving Party
- DrumMania 4thMix
- DrumMania 5thMix
- GTI Club 2
- GuitarFreaks 5thMix
- GuitarFreaks 6thMix
- Gun Mania
- Gun Mania Zone Plus
- Jurassic Park III
- Keyboardmania 3rdMix
- Kick & Kick
- Mambo a Go Go
- Mocap Boxing
- Monster Gate
- Police 911 (America), The Keisatsukan (Japan & Asia), Police 24/7 (Europe)
- Police 911 2 (America), The Keisatsukan 2 (Japan & Asia), Police 24/7 2 (Europe)
- ParaParaParadise 2ndMix
- Pop'n Music 6
- Pop'n Music 7
- Pop'n Music Animelo 2
- Salary Man Champ
- Silent Scope EX (Sogeki in Japan)
- Thrill Drive 2
- Tsurugi: The Sword
2002
- Beatmania 7thMix Keepin' Evolution
- Beatmania IIDX 7th Style
- Beatmania IIDX 8th Style
- Beatmania III Append 7th Mix
- Beatmania III The Final
- Beatmania The Final
- Dance Dance Revolution Extreme
- DDRMAX2 Dance Dance Revolution 7thMix
- Dancing Stage EuroMix 2
- Great Bishi Bashi Champ: Button Tatakisugi Keihō
- Dog Station
- Dog Station Deluxe
- DrumMania 6thMix
- DrumMania 7thMix
- DrumMania 7thMIX power-up ver.
- GuitarFreaks 7thMix
- GuitarFreaks 8thMix
- GuitarFreaks 8thMix power-up ver.
- Mahjong Fight Club
- Martial Beat
- Mocap Golf
- Monster Gate 2
- Nice Smash!
- Perfect Pool
- Poolpocket
- Pop'n Music 8
- Pop'n Music 9
- Silent Scope Fortune Hunter
- Warring States
- World Soccer Winning Eleven Arcade Game Style (Japan) / Pro Evolution Soccer The Arcade (World)
- Xtrial Racing
2003
- Beatmania IIDX 9th Style
- DrumMania 8thMix
- DrumMania 9thMix
- ee'mall
- GuitarFreaks 9thMix
- GuitarFreaks 10thMix
- Mahjong Fight Club 2
- Monster Gate 3
- Pop'n Music 10
- Quiz Magic Academy
- R.P.M. Red
- World Combat (Warzaid)
- World Soccer Winning Eleven Arcade Game Style 2003
2004
- Battle Climaxx!
- Beatmania IIDX 10th Style
- Beatmania IIDX 11 IIDXRED
- DrumMania 10thMix
- ee'mall 2nd Avenue
- GuitarFreaks 11thMix
- Lethal Enforcers 3
- Mahjong Fight Club 3
- Monster Gate Online
- Pop'n Music 11
- Pop'n Music 12 Iroha
- Quiz Magic Academy 2
- Thrill Drive 3 (Japanese release)
- Wartran Troopers
2005
- Baseball Heroes
- Battle Climaxx! 2
- Beatmania IIDX 12: Happy Sky
- Bishi Bashi Champ Online: Shōgeki no Zenkoku Taisen!?
- Dance 86.4 Funky Radio Station
- Dancing Stage Fusion
- DrumMania V
- DrumMania V2
- Gashaaaan
- GuitarFreaks V
- GuitarFreaks V2
- Mahjong Fight Club 4
- Monster Gate Online 2
- Paintball Mania
- Pop'n Music 13 Carnival
- Quiz Magic Academy 3
- Toy's March
- Toy's March 2
2006
- Baseball Heroes 2
- Beatmania IIDX 13 Distorted
- Cooper's9
- Dance Dance Revolution SuperNova (Japanese release)
- Dance Dance Revolution SuperNova (North American release)
- Dance Dance Revolution SuperNova (North American re-release)
- Dancing Stage SuperNova
- Dancing Stage SuperNova (re-release)
- DrumMania V3
- GuitarFreaks V3
- Mahjong Fight Club 5
- Nova Usagi
- Pop'n Music 14 Fever!
- World Soccer Winning Eleven 2006 Arcade Championship (Japan) / Pro Evolution Soccer 2006 Arcade Championship (World)
2007

- Baseball Heroes 3
- Beatmania IIDX 14 Gold
- Beatmania IIDX 15 DJ Troopers
- Dance Dance Revolution SuperNova 2 (Japanese release)
- DrumMania V4: Яock×Rock
- GuitarFreaks V4: Яock×Rock
- Mahjong Fight Club 6
- Otomedius
- Otona no Onnaryoku Kentei
- Pop'n Music 15: Adventure
- Quiz Magic Academy IV
- Silent Hill: The Arcade
2008
- Action Deka
- Baseball Heroes 2008: Seiha
- beatmania IIDX 16 EMPRESS
- Dance Dance Revolution SuperNova 2 (Asian release)
- Dance Dance Revolution SuperNova 2 (North American release)
- Dance Dance Revolution SuperNova 2 (South American release)
- Dance Dance Revolution X (Asian release)
- Dance Dance Revolution X (Japanese release)
- DrumMania V5: Rock to Infinity
- GuitarFreaks V5: Rock to Infinity
- Mahjong Fight Club 7
- Pop'n Music 16: Party
- Quiz Magic Academy V
- jubeat
- World Soccer Winning Eleven Arcade Championship 2008
2009
- Baseball Heroes 2009: Hasha
- beatmania IIDX 17 SIRIUS
- THE Bishi Bashi
- Castlevania: The Arcade
- Dance Dance Revolution X (North American release)
- Dance Dance Revolution X (European release)
- DrumMania V6: Blazing!!!!
- GuitarFreaks V6: Blazing!!!!
- Mahjong Fight Club 7.77
- Mahjong Fight Club Garyō Tensei
- Pop'n Music 17: The Movie
- Quiz Magic Academy VI
- Quiz Magic Academy VI Extra
- jubeat ripples

=== 2010–2019 ===
2010
- Baseball Heroes 2010: Winner
- beatmania IIDX 18: Resort Anthem
- Dance Dance Revolution X2 (Asian release)
- Dance Dance Revolution X2 (Japanese release)
- Dance Dance Revolution X2 (U.S. release)
- DrumMania V7
- DrumMania XG&GuitarFreaks XG
- GuitarFreaks V7
- jubeat knit
- Mahjong Fight Club Ultimate Version
- pop'n music 18: Sengoku Retsuden
- pop'n music 19: Tune Street
- Quiz Magic Academy VII
- World Soccer Winning Eleven Arcade Championship 2010
- Metal Gear Arcade
2011
- Baseball Heroes 2011: Shine Star
- beatmania IIDX 19: Lincle
- Dance Dance Revolution X3 (Japanese release)
- DrumMania V8
- DrumMania XG2&GuitarFreaks XG2
- GuitarFreaks V8
- Hello! pop'n music
- jubeat copious
- jubeat knit APPEND
- Mahjong Fight Club u.v.: Kizuna no Shō
- pop'n music 20: fantasia
- Quiz Magic Academy VIII
- Steel Chronicle
- World Soccer Winning Eleven Arcade Championship 2012
2012
- Baseball Heroes 2012
- beatmania IIDX 20: Tricoro
- Dance Evolution Arcade
- GuitarFreaks XG3&DrumMania XG3
- Mahjong Fight Club NEXT
- pop'n music: Sunny Park
- Quiz Magic Academy: Kenja no Tobira
- Sound Voltex Booth
- Steel Chronicle Be
2013
- Baseball Heroes 2013
- beatmania IIDX 21 SPADA
- Dance Dance Revolution (2013 edition) (Japanese release)
- Dance Dance Revolution (2013 edition) (Asian release)
- GITADORA
- Mahjong Fight Club: Itadaki no Zin
- Mirai Dagakki: Future Tom Tom
- Mirai Dagakki: Future Tom Tom, Ver. 2
- Quiz Magic Academy: Kenja no Tobira Season 2
- SOUND VOLTEX II -infinite infection-
- Steel Chronicle Be XROSS ARMS
- Steel Chronicle Victroopers
- World Soccer Winning Eleven Arcade Championship 2014
2014
- Baseball Heroes 2014
- beatmania IIDX 22 PENDUAL
- BeatStream
- Dance Dance Revolution (2014 edition)
- GITADORA OverDrive
- Mahjong Fight Club: Sai no Hana
- pop'n music: Lapistoria
- Quiz Magic Academy: Ten no Manabiya
- SCOTTO
- SOUND VOLTEX III -GRAVITY WARS-
- Silent Scope: Bone Eater
2015
- BeatStream AnimTribe
- Otoca D'or
- Quiz Magic Academy: Akatsuki no Kane
- MÚSECA
- pop'n music éclale
- Disney Tsum Tsum (Arcade)
- Jubeat Prop
- Reflec Beat Volzza
- Beatmania IIDX 23: copula
- Monster Strike MULTI BURST
- GITADORA Tri-Boost
2016
- Mahjong Fight Club Zero
- GI-VICTORY ROAD
- MÚSECA 1+1/2
- Jubeat Qubell
- Reflec Beat Volzza 2
- Reflec Beat: The Reflesia of Eternity
- Dance Dance Revolution A
- Quiz Magic Academy: Tokyo Grimoire
- beatmania IIDX 24: SINOBUZ
- SOUND VOLTEX IV HEAVENLY HAVEN
- pop'n music: Usagi to Neko to Shōnen no Yume
- GITADORA Tri-Boost Re:EVOLVE
2017
- Nostalgia
- Mahjong Fight Club: Gōka Kenran
- Quiz Magic Academy: THE WORLD EVOLVE
- jubeat Clan
- Nostalgia FORTE
- GITADORA Matixx
2018
- Baseball Collection
- beatmania IIDX 25: Cannon Ballers
- Bishi Bashi Channel
- DANCERUSH Stardom
- Quiz Magic Academy: MAXIVCORD
- beatmania IIDX 26: Rootage
- Mahjong Fight Club: Grand Master
- Nostalgia Op.2
- Bombergirl
- jubeat festo
- pop'n music peace
- GITADORA EXCHAIN
2019
- Baseball Collection Season 2019
- Sound Voltex: Vivid Wave
- Dance Dance Revolution A20
- Quiz Magic Academy: Kiseki no Kōsa -Xross Voyage-
- beatmania IIDX 27: Heroic Verse
- Nostalgia Op.3
- GITADORA NEX+AGE

=== 2020–present ===
2020
- Baseball Collection Season 2020
- Quiz Magic Academy: Kibou no Toki
- Mahjong Fight Club: Jifēng
- Dance Dance Revolution A20 PLUS
- beatmania IIDX 28: Bistrover
- Busou Shinki: Armored Princess Battle Conductor
- NEW pop'n music Welcome to Wonderland！
- pop'n music: Kaimei Riddles

2021
- Sound Voltex Exceed Gear
- Baseball Collection Season 2021
- beatmania IIDX 29: CastHour
- Quiz Magic Academy: Mugen no kagami-kai
- GITADORA HIGH-VOLTAGE

2022
- beatmania IIDX 30: RESIDENT
- Dance Dance Revolution A3
- GITADORA FUZZ-UP
- jubeat Ave.
- Chase Chase Jokers
- pop'n music UniLab

2023
- jubeat beyond the Ave.
- beatmania IIDX 31: EPOLIS

2024
- Polaris Chord
- GITADORA GALAXY WAVE
- Dance Dance Revolution WORLD
- pop'n music Jam&Fizz
- beatmania IIDX 32: Pinky Crush
- Monster Retsuden Oreca Battle 2

2025
- GITADORA GALAXY WAVE DELTA
- beatmania IIDX 33: Sparkle Shower
- pop'n music High☆Cheers!!
- Sound Voltex ∇

2026
- SAZAE-SAN Machigai Sagashi
- GASHAAAAN
- DanceDanceRevolution STOMP
- Demon Slayer: Nichirin Battle Slash Arcade Machine
- beatmania IIDX 34 Zinrai

== Atari 2600 ==
1983

- Pooyan
- Marine Wars (by Konami and Digivision jointly)
- Strategy X

== 3DO ==
1995
- Policenauts Pilot Disk
- Policenauts

== MSX ==
1983
- Antarctic Adventure
- Monkey Academy (also released by Philips as VG 8102)
- Time Pilot
- Frogger
- Super Cobra
- Konami's Billiards (also known as Video Hustler and also released by Sony as HBS-G008C)
- Sparkie (released by Sony)
- Juno First (released by Sony)
- Crazy Train (released by Sony)
1984
- Athletic Land
- Konami's Mahjong
- Hyper Olympic 1 (also known as Track & Field 1 and also released by Sony as HBS-G010C )
- Hyper Olympic 2 (also known as Track & Field 2 and also released by Sony as HBS-G011C)
- Circus Charlie (also released by Casio as GPM-105)
- Magical Tree
- Comic Bakery
- Hyper Sports 1
- Cabbage Patch Kids
- Hyper Sports 2 (also released by Sony as HBS-G012C)
- Sky Jaguar
- Konami's Pinball (never released)
- Badlands (LaserDisc game)
- Road Fighter (also released by Casio as GPM-116)
1985
- Hyper Rally
- Konami's Tennis (also released by Casio as GPM-106)
- Konami's Golf
- Konami's Baseball
- Yie-Ar Kung Fu (also released by Casio as GPM-108)
- King's Valley (also released by Casio as GPM-110)
- Mopi Ranger (also released by Casio as GPM-111)
- Pippols
- Konami's Ping Pong
- Konami's Soccer
- Hyper Sports 3
- Game Master
- Konami's Boxing
- Yie-Ar Kung Fu 2 (also released by Casio as GPM-121)
- Pooyan (released by Hudson as a Bee Card)
- Japanese Word Processor unit
1986
- The Goonies
- Knightmare (also released by Casio as GPM-122)
- TwinBee (also released by MagaCom as SN-215 and Casio as GPM-127)
- Konami's Synthesizer
- Gradius (also known as Nemesis in Europe)
- Penguin Adventure
- Q*bert
- Green Beret (the only game by Konami UK)
1987
- The Maze of Galious
- Gradius 2 (also known as Nemesis 2 in Europe)
- F1 Spirit
- Shalom
- The Game Master 2
- Salamander (also released by MagaCom as SN-906)
1988
- Parodius
- King's Valley II
- Gofer no Yabō Episode II (released as Nemesis 3: The Eve of Destruction in Europe)
- Konami Game Collection 1 (Knightmare, Antarctic Adventure, Yie-Ar Kung Fu, Yie-Ar Kung Fu 2, King's Valley)
- Konami Game Collection 2 (Boxing, Tennis, Video Hustler, Hyper Olympic 1, Hyper Sports 2)
- Konami Game Collection 3 (TwinBee, Super Cobra, Sky Jaguar, Time Pilot, Nemesis)
- Konami Game Collection 4 (Soccer, Ping-Pong, Golf, Hyper Olympic 2, Hyper Sports 3)
1989
- Konami Game Collection Extra
1990
- Teenage Mutant Hero Turtles

== MSX2 ==
1986
- Akumajō Dracula (called Vampire Killer in Europe)
- King Kong 2: Yomigaeru Densetsu
1987
- Ganbare Goemon
- Hi no Tori
- Metal Gear
- Uşas
1988
- King's Valley II
- The Pro Yakyū: Gekitotsu; Pennant Race
- Konami's Uranai Sensation
- Snatcher
- Break Shot (never released)
1989
- Contra
- Konami Game Collection Extra (Pippols, Hyper Rally, Road Fighter, Tsururin Kun, Hyper Somen, Title Awase, Go Board)
- The Pro Yakyū: Gekitotsu; Pennant Race 2
- Hai no Majutsushi (also known as Mah-Jong 2)
- Space Manbow
- Tentochito (never released, not confirmed)
1990
- Metal Gear 2: Solid Snake
- Quarth
- SD Snatcher

== MSX2+ ==
1988
- F1 Spirit 3D Special (two MSX2+ computers could be linked with a multiplayer link cable)

== PC ==
1988
- Contra/Gryzor
- Top Gunner
1989
- Bloodwych
- Boot Camp
- Rush'n Attack
- Teenage Mutant Ninja Turtles/Teenage Mutant Hero Turtles
1990
- Bill Elliott's NASCAR Challenge
- Blades of Steel
- Castlevania
- Double Dribble
- Metal Gear
- Predator 2
- Super C
- Theme Park Mystery
1991
- J.R.R. Tolkien's Riders of Rohan
- Killing Cloud
- Mission: Impossible
- Spacewrecked: 14 Billion Light Years from Earth
- The Simpsons: Arcade Game
- The Simpsons: Bart's House of Weirdness
- Team Suzuki
- Teenage Mutant Ninja Turtles: The Arcade Game/Teenage Mutant Hero Turtles: The Coin-Op!
- Teenage Mutant Ninja Turtles: Manhattan Missions
- Top Gun: Danger Zone
1992
- Batman Returns
- NFL
- Plan 9 from Outer Space
1993
- Frontier: Elite 2
- NFL Video Pro Football
1996
- Eisei Meijin for Windows 95
- Kirameki Houseki Bako: Tokimeki Memorial Screen Saver Vol. 1
- Ukiuki Bento Bako: Tokimeki Memorial Screen Saver Vol. 2
- Tokimeki Memorial Taisen: Puzzle Dama
1997
- Gradius Deluxe Pack
- Jikkyō Powerful Pro Yakyū '96
- Henry Explorers
- Rakugaki Enogu Bako: Tokimeki Memorial Screen Saver Vol. 3
- Dokidoki Bikkuri Hako: Tokimeki Memorial Screen Saver Vol. 4
- Tokimeki Memorial: Forever With You
- Polyco Gal
- Frontier Brain
1998
- Vandal Hearts
- TwinBee PARADISE in Donburi Shima
- Genso Suikoden
- Tokimeki Memorial: Oshiete Your Heart
- Mahjong Master
- Jikkyō Powerful Pro Yakyū
2000
- Metal Gear Solid: Integral
- The Grinch
- The Mummy
- Woody Woodpecker Racing
2001
- Dancing Karaoke DKara
- Jikkyō Powerful Pro Yakyū: Online Taisen-ban
2002
- Dance Dance Revolution
- ESPN NFL PrimeTime 2002
- Frogger: The Great Quest
- Konami Collector's Series: Castlevania & Contra
- Shadow of Destiny
- Silent Hill 2: Director's Cut
- Tokimeki Memorial Typing
- Whiteout
2003
- Apocalyptica
- Bomberman Collection
- Casino, Inc.
- Frogger Beyond
- Frogger's Adventures: The Rescue
- Genso Suikoden II
- International Superstar Soccer 3
- Metal Gear Solid 2: Substance
- Pro Evolution Soccer 3
- Powerful Pro Yakyū ONLINE
- Silent Hill 3
- Teenage Mutant Ninja Turtles
- Tokimeki Memorial 2 Typing
- Yu-Gi-Oh! Power of Chaos: Yugi the Destiny
2004
- Pro Evolution Soccer 4
- Silent Hill 4: The Room
- Teenage Mutant Ninja Turtles 2: Battle Nexus
- Tokimeki Memorial Girl's Side 1st Love Typing
- Yu-Gi-Oh! Power of Chaos: Kaiba the Revenge
- Yu-Gi-Oh! Power of Chaos: Joey the Passion
2005
- Crime Life: Gang Wars
- Pro Evolution Soccer 5
- Teenage Mutant Ninja Turtles: Mutant Melee
- Yu-Gi-Oh! Online
- Tokimeki Factory Vol.1: Tokimeki Memorial Girl's Side
- Tokimeki Factory Vol.2: Tokimeki Memorial Girl's Side
2006
- Busou Shinki DIORAMA STUDIO
- Pro Evolution Soccer 6
- The Regiment
- Winx Club
- Tokimeki Factory: Tokimeki Memorial 2
2007
- Busou Shinki BATTLE RONDO
- Marvel Trading Card Game
- Tokimeki Memorial Girl's Side 2nd Kiss Typing
- Pro Evolution Soccer 2008
- Yu-Gi-Oh! Online Duel Evolution
2008
- Pro Evolution Soccer 2009
- Silent Hill: Homecoming
2009
- Pro Evolution Soccer 2010
- Saw: The Videogame
2010
- Pro Evolution Soccer 2011
2011
- Pro Evolution Soccer 2012
2012
- Pro Evolution Soccer 2013
2013
- Castlevania: Lords of Shadow
- Pro Evolution Soccer 2014
2014
- Metal Gear Rising: Revengeance
- Castlevania: Lords of Shadow 2
- Pro Evolution Soccer 2015
- Metal Gear Solid V: Ground Zeroes
2015
- Metal Gear Solid V: The Phantom Pain
- Pro Evolution Soccer 2016
2016
- Pro Evolution Soccer 2017
- Yu-Gi-Oh! Legacy of the Duelist
2017
- SOUNDVOLTEX III: Gravity Wars e-Amusement Cloud
- Pro Evolution Soccer 2018 (Europe, Australia & North America) / Winning Eleven 2018 (Japan & Asia)
2018
- Metal Gear Survive
- Pro Evolution Soccer 2019 (Europe, Australia & North America) / Winning Eleven 2019 (Japan & Asia)
- Super Bomberman R
- Zone of the Enders: The 2nd Runner MARS (Europe, Australia & North America) / Anubis: Zone of The Enders MARS (Japan & Asia)
2019
- Arcade Classics Anniversary Collection
- Castlevania Anniversary Collection
- Contra Anniversary Collection
- Contra: Rogue Corps
- eFootball PES 2020 (Europe, Australia & North America) / eFootball Winning Eleven 2020 (Japan & Asia)
2020
- Skelattack
- eFootball PES 2021 Season Update (Europe, Australia & North America) / eFootball Winning Eleven 2021 Season Update (Japan & Asia)
2021
- Crimesight
- Yu-Gi-Oh! Master Duel
- Dance Dance Revolution GRAND PRIX
- Castlevania Advance Collection
2022
- Getsu Fūma Den: Undying Moon
- Teenage Mutant Ninja Turtles: The Cowabunga Collection
2023
- Super Bomberman R 2
- Metal Gear Solid: Master Collection
- Super Crazy Rhythm Castle
2024
- Contra: Operation Galuga
- Rocket Knight Adventures: Re-Sparked!
- CYGNI: All Guns Blazing
- Castlevania Dominus Collection
- Powerful Baseball Spirits 2024-2025
- Silent Hill 2
2025
- Ninja Five-O
- Yu-Gi-Oh! Early Days Collection
- Suikoden I & II HD Remaster Gate Rune and Dunan Unification Wars
- Deliver At All Costs
- Metal Gear Solid Delta: Snake Eater
- Silent Hill f
- Edens Zero
2026
- Super Bomberman Collection
TBD
- Darwin's Paradox!
- Wai Wai World Craft

=== EGG ===
- Parodius
- Gradius
- Salamander
- Detana!! TwinBee
- Penguin Adventure

== PC-8801 ==
1986
- Gradius
- The Goonies
1988
- Snatcher
1990
- Ten to Chi to
Cancelled
- Majou Densetsu II: Poporon Gekitou Hen

== Picno ==
- Save Card
- Montage
- Fushigi no kuni no Alice
- Picno de ABC
- Anime enikki
- Picno de AIUEO
- Picno de 123
- Picno Art Puzzle
- Real Montage
- Kīroi Kyōryū-kun Parasa no Obake Taiji
- Dokkin Shinri Game
- Picno de kuku
- Shira Yuki Hime Monogatari
- Nontan to issho anime stamp
- Manfī no fushigina bōken
- Son Gokū no Bōken
- Sen'yō Card Soft

== PC-9801 ==
1989
- Dennou Shougi

1990
- Quarth

== PC-9821 ==
1994
- Policenauts

== Famicom / NES ==
1985
- Antarctic Adventure
- Yie Ar Kung-Fu
- Track & Field
- Road Fighter
1986
- TwinBee
- The Goonies
- Circus Charlie
- Gradius
- Ganbare Goemon: Karakuri Douchuu
- Castlevania
- Stinger
- Crackout
- King Kong 2: Ikari no Megaton Punch
1987
- Hi no Tori Hououhen: Gaou no Bouken
- Esper Dream
- The Goonies II
- Rush'n Attack
- Ai Senshi Nicol
- Meikyuu Jiin Dababa
- Smash Ping Pong
- Exciting Billiard
- Getsu Fūma Den
- Double Dribble
- Majō Densetsu II: The Maze of Galious
- Arumana no Kiseki
- Castlevania II: Simon's Quest
- Life Force
- Falsion
- Dragon Scroll
- Doremikko
- Exciting Baseball
- Top Gun
- Exciting Boxing
- Metal Gear
1988
- Konami Wai Wai World
- Contra
- Exciting Soccer: Konami Cup
- Konami Hyper Soccer
- Tetsuwan Atom
- Bio Miracle Bokutte Upa
- Jackal
- Risa no Yōsei Densetsu
- Jarinko Chie
- Blades of Steel
- The Adventures of Bayou Billy
- Konamic Tennis
- Gyruss
- Gradius II
- Skate or Die!
1989
- Ganbare Goemon 2
- Motocross Champion
- Ganbare Pennant Race
- Q*bert (US version)
- Teenage Mutant Ninja Turtles
- Defender of the Crown (developed by Beam Software)
- Cosmic Wars
- Racer Mini Yonku: Japan Cup
- Track & Field II
- TwinBee 3: Poko Poko Daimaō
- Top Gun: The Second Mission
- Castlevania III: Dracula's Curse
- Silent Service (developed by Rare)
- NHK Gakuen – Space School – Sansu 4 Nen (Ge)
- NHK Gakuen – Space School – Sansu 4 Nen (Jou)
- NHK Gakuen – Space School – Sansu 5 Nen (Ge)
- NHK Gakuen – Space School – Sansu 5 Nen (Jou)
- NHK Gakuen – Space School – Sansu 6 Nen (Ge):
- NHK Gakuen – Space School – Sansu 6 Nen (Jou)
1990
- Ganbare Goemon Gaiden: Kieta Ōgon Kiseru
- Kings of the Beach
- Super C
- Moai-kun
- Mōryō Senki MADARA
- Jack Nicklaus' Greatest 18 Holes of Major Championship Golf
- Quarth
- Snake's Revenge
- Mission: Impossible
- RollerGames
- Akumajō Special: Boku Dracula-kun
- Parodius
- Teenage Mutant Ninja Turtles II: The Arcade Game
- Idemitsu – Space College – Kikenbutsu no Yasashii Butsuri to Kagaku
1991
- Wai Wai World 2: SOS!! Parsley Jō
- Yume Penguin Monogatari
- Ski or Die
- Laser Invasion
- Lagrange Point
- Base Wars
- Crisis Force
- The Lone Ranger
- Where in Time Is Carmen Sandiego? (developed by Distinctive Software)
- Pirates! (developed by Rare)
- Rampart (Japan version)
- Teenage Mutant Ninja Turtles III: The Manhattan Project
- Tiny Toon Adventures
- Bill Elliott's NASCAR Challenge (developed by Distinctive Software)
1992
- Ganbare Goemon Gaiden 2: Tenka no Zaihō
- Bucky O'Hare
- Monster in My Pocket
- Nightshade (developed by Beam Software)
- Star Trek 25th Anniversary (developed by Interplay)
- Esper Dream 2
- King's Quest V: Absence Makes the Heart Go Yonder! (developed by Novotrade)
- Contra Force
- Tiny Toon Adventures 2: Trouble in Wackyland
- Tiny Toon Adventures Cartoon Workshop (developed by Novotrade)
- Noah's Ark (developed by Source Research & Development)
1993
- Formula 1 Sensation
- Batman Returns
- Zen Intergalactic Ninja
- Rackets & Rivals
- Nigel Mansell's World Championship Racing (Published in Europe by Konami) (Developed by Gremlin Graphics Software)
1994
- Teenage Mutant Ninja Turtles: Tournament Fighters
Cancelled Games
- Battle Choice

== Super Famicom / Super NES ==
1990
- Gradius III
1991
- The Legend of the Mystical Ninja
- Super Castlevania IV
1992
- Axelay
- Contra III: The Alien Wars
- Cybernator (Assault Suits Valken in Japan) (Developed by Masaya)
- Parodius Da! －Shinwa kara Owarai e－
- Prince of Persia (Developed by Masaya)
- Teenage Mutant Ninja Turtles IV: Turtles in Time
- Tiny Toon Adventures: Buster Busts Loose!
1993
- Batman Returns
- Ganbare Goemon 2
- Mōryō Senki MADARA 2
- NFL Football (Developed by Park Place Productions)
- Pop'n Twinbee
- Sunset Riders
- Teenage Mutant Ninja Turtles: Tournament Fighters
- Zombies Ate My Neighbors (Developed by LucasArts)
1994
- The Adventures of Batman & Robin
- Animaniacs
- Biker Mice From Mars
- Ganbare Goemon 3
- Gokujō Parodius! ～Kako no Eikō o Motomete～
- International Superstar Soccer
- Jikkyō Powerful Pro Yakyū '94
- Twinbee: Rainbow Bell Adventures
- Sparkster
- Shin Mahjong
- Tiny Toon Adventures: Wacky Sports Challenge
- Tsuyoshi Shikkari Shinasai: Taisen Puzzle-dama
1995
- Castlevania: Dracula X
- Chibi Maruko-chan: Mezase! Minami no Island!!
- Ganbare Goemon 4
- International Superstar Soccer Deluxe
- Jikkyō Oshaberi Parodius
- Jikkyō Powerful Pro Yakyū 2
- Metal Warriors (USA only) (Developed by LucasArts)
- NBA Give 'n Go
1996
- Jikkyō Power Pro Wrestling '96: Max Voltage
- Jikkyō Powerful Pro Yakyū '96 Kaimaku-ban
- Jikkyō Powerful Pro Yakyū 3
- Tokimeki Memorial
- Jikkyō Keiba Simulation: Stable Star
- Soreyuke Ebisumaru Karakuri Meiro - Kieta Goemon no Nazo
1997
- Jikkyō Powerful Pro Yakyū 3 '97 Haru
1998
- Jikkyō Powerful Pro Yakyū: Basic-ban '98

== Nintendo 64 ==
1996
- Jikkyō J. League Perfect Striker
1997
- International Superstar Soccer 64
- Jikkyō Powerful Pro Yakyū 4
- Mystical Ninja Starring Goemon
1998
- Castlevania 64
- Deadly Arts
- International Superstar Soccer '98
- NBA In The Zone '98
- Susume! Taisen Puzzle Dama: Tōkon! Marutama Chō
- Jikkyō Powerful Pro Yakyū 5
- Nagano Winter Olympics '98
- Holy Magic Century (a.k.a. Quest 64)
- NHL Blades of Steel '99
- Rakugakids
- Goemon's Great Adventure
1999
- Castlevania: Legacy of Darkness
- Bottom of the 9th
- Hybrid Heaven
- Jikkyō Powerful Pro Yakyū 6
- Jikkyō GI Stable
- Goemon Mononoke Sugoroku
- International Superstar Soccer 2000
2000
- NBA In The Zone 2000
- Jikkyō Powerful Pro Yakyū 2000
- Dance Dance Revolution Disney's World Dancing Museum
2001
- Jikkyō Powerful Pro Yakyū Basic-ban 2001

== GameCube ==
2002
- Winning Eleven 6: Final Evolution
- Captain Tsubasa: Golden Generation Challenge
- Disney Sports Football
- Frogger Beyond
- Disney Sports Skateboarding
- ESPN International Winter Sports 2002
- ESPN MLS ExtraTime 2002
- Evolution Skateboarding
- Hyper Sports Winter 2002
- International Superstar Soccer 2
- Jikkyo Powerful Pro Yakyū 9
- Jikkyo World Soccer 2002
- Muscle Champion: Kinnikutou Kessen
- WTA Tour Tennis
2003
- Crash Bandicoot: The Wrath of Cortex (distributed by Konami)
- Teenage Mutant Ninja Turtles
- Disney Sports Basketball
- Frogger's Adventures: The Rescue
- Yu-Gi-Oh! The Falsebound Kingdom
- DreamMix TV World Fighters
- Evolution Snowboarding
- Hikaru no Go
- Hikaru no Go 3
- International Superstar Soccer 3
- Jikkyo Powerful Pro Yakyū 10
- Jikkyo Powerful Pro Yakyū 10 Chō Kettei-ban
- The Baseball 2003: Battle Ballpark Sengen Perfect Play Pro Yakyū
2004
- Metal Gear Solid: The Twin Snakes
- Teenage Mutant Ninja Turtles 2: Battle Nexus
- King Arthur
- Crash Nitro Kart (distributed by Konami)
- Jikkyo Powerful Pro Yakyū 11
- Jikkyo Powerful Pro Yakyū 11 Chō Kettei-ban
2005
- Dance Dance Revolution Mario Mix
- TMNT: Mutant Melee
- Teenage Mutant Ninja Turtles 3: Mutant Nightmare
- Karaoke Revolution Party
- Frogger: Ancient Shadow
- Jikkyo Powerful Pro Yakyū 12
- Jikkyo Powerful Pro Yakyū 12 Chō Kettei-ban
- Rave Master
2006
- Jikkyō Powerful Major League
2007
- Korokke! Pan Ou no Kiki wo Sukue (cancelled)
- Street Kings

== Wii ==
2006
- Elebits
2007
- Dance Dance Revolution Hottest Party
- Dewy's Adventure
- Jikkyō Powerful Pro Yakyū Wii
- Jikkyō Powerful Major League 2 (Japan) / MLB Power Pros (North America)
2008
- Castlevania Judgment
- Dance Dance Revolution Hottest Party 2
- Jikkyō Powerful Pro Yakyū 15
- Jikkyō Powerful Major League 3 (Japan) / MLB Power Pros 2008 (North America)
- Lost in Blue: Shipwrecked
- Pro Evolution Soccer 2008
- Gradius Rebirth
- Critter Round-Up
- Guinness World Records: The Video Game
2009
- Jikkyō Powerful Pro Yakyū NEXT
- Jikkyō Powerful Major League 2009
- Pro Evolution Soccer 2009
- Silent Hill: Shattered Memories
- Scene It? Twilight
- Castlevania: The Adventure ReBirth
- Tomena Sanner
- Sandy Beach
- Driift Mania
- Pop'n Music Wii
- Contra ReBirth
- Ant Nation
- Dance Dance Revolution Hottest Party 3
- Dance Dance Revolution Winx Club
- Tornado Outbreak
- Yu-Gi-Oh! 5D's Whellie Breakers
2010
- Pro Evolution Soccer 2010
- Def Jam Rapstar
- Ben 10 Alien Force: The Rise of Hex
- Yard Sale Hidden Treasures: Sunnyville
- Dance Dance Revolution
- Gormiti: The Lords of Nature!
- Yu-Gi-Oh! 5D's: Master of the Cards (Japan) / Yu-Gi-Oh! 5D's: Duel Transer (North America & Europe)
2011
- Dance Dance Revolution II
- Ra.One (Europe only)

=== Virtual Console ===
- Super Castlevania IV
- Contra III: The Alien Wars
- Gradius
- Teenage Mutant Ninja Turtles
- Road Fighter
- Gradius III
- Castlevania
- The Legend of the Mystical Ninja
- Gradius II: Ambition of Gofer
- Konami's Ping Pong
- Antarctic Adventure
- Salamander
- Detana! Twinbee
- Super C
- Esper Dream
- Axelay
- Cybernator
- Castlevania II: Simon's Quest
- Ganbare Goemon! Karakuri Dōchū
- Getsu Fūma Den
- Double Dribble
- Parodius
- Space Manbow
- Bio Miracle Bokutte Upa
- Ganbare Goemon 3: Shichijuurokubei no Karakuri Manji Gatame
- Ganbare Goemon Gaiden: Kieta Ōgon Kiseru
- Castlevania: Rondo of Blood

== Wii U ==
=== Virtual Console ===
- Parodius
- Space Manbow
- Super Castlevania IV
- Contra III: The Alien Wars
- Gradius
- The Legend of the Mystical Ninja
- Penguin Adventure

== Sega Mega Drive/Genesis ==
1992
- Sunset Riders
- Teenage Mutant Ninja Turtles: The Hyperstone Heist
1993
- Lethal Enforcers
- Rocket Knight Adventures
- Teenage Mutant Ninja Turtles: Tournament Fighters
- Tiny Toon Adventures: Buster's Hidden Treasure
- Zombies Ate My Neighbors (Developed by LucasArts)
1994
- Animaniacs
- Castlevania: Bloodlines
- Contra: Hard Corps
- Double Dribble: The Playoff Edition
- Lethal Enforcers II: Gunfighters
- Nigel Mansell's World Championship Racing (Published in Europe by Konami) (Developed by Gremlin Graphics Software)
- Sparkster: Rocket Knight Adventures 2
- Tiny Toon Adventures: ACME All-Stars
1996
- International Superstar Soccer Deluxe

== Sega Mega-CD ==
1993
- Lethal Enforcers
1994
- Lethal Enforcers II: Gunfighters
- Snatcher

== Sega Saturn ==
1995
- Chibi Maruko-Chan: No Taisen Puzzle Dama
- Detana Twinbee Yahho! Deluxe Pack
- Eisei Meijin
- Gokujō Parodius Da! Deluxe Pack
- Jikkyō Powerful Pro Yakyū '95
1996
- Bottom of the 9th
- Eisei Meijin II
- Gradius Deluxe Pack
- Jikkyō Oshaberi Parodius: Forever with Me
- Policenauts
- Sexy Parodius
- Snatcher
- Tokimeki Memorial: Forever With You
- Tokimeki Memorial Taisen: Puzzle Dama
1997
- Contra: Legacy of War
- Crypt Killer
- Jikkyō Powerful Pro Yakyū S
- Salamander Deluxe Pack Plus
- Tokimeki Memorial Drama Series Vol. 1: Nijiiro no Seishun
- Tokimeki Memorial Selection: Fujisaki Shiori
- Tokimeki Memorial Taisen: Tokkae Dama
- Vandal Hearts
- Whizz
1998
- Akumajō Dracula X: Gekka no Yasōkyoku (Castlevania: Symphony of the Night)
- Genso Suikoden
- J-League Jikkyō Honoo no Striker
- Konami Antiques MSX Collection Ultra Pack
- Tokimeki Memorial Drama Series Vol. 2: Irodori no Love Song
- Yoshimura Shogi
1999
- Tokimeki Memorial Drama Series Vol. 3: Tabidachi no Uta

== Dreamcast ==
1999
- Airforce Delta (Japan & North America) / Deadly Skies (Europe)
- Dancing Blade: Katte ni Momo Tenshi
- Dancing Blade: Katte ni Momo Tenshi II - Tears Of Eden
- Eisei Meijin III
- Pop'n Music
- Pop'n Music 2
2000
- Dance Dance Revolution 2ndMix
- Dance Dance Revolution Club Version Dreamcast Edition
- ESPN International Track & Field
- ESPN NBA 2Night
- Jikkyō Powerful Pro Yakyū Dreamcast Edition
- Nightmare Creatures II
- Pop'n Music 3 Append Disc
- Pop'n Music 4 Append Disc
- Silent Scope
- The Grinch
Cancelled Games
- Castlevania Resurrection
- Reiselied
- Woody Woodpecker Racing

== PlayStation ==
1994
- Gokujō Parodius Da! Deluxe Pack
- Jikkyō Powerful Pro Yakyū '95
- TwinBee Taisen Puzzle Dama
1995
- Detana TwinBee Yahho! Deluxe Pack
- Eisei Meijin
- J-League Winning Eleven
- NBA In The Zone
- Suikoden
- Tokimeki Memorial: Forever With You
1996
- Bottom of the 9th
- Contra: Legacy of War
- Eisei Meijin II
- The Final Round
- Ganbare Goemon: Uchū Kaizoku Akogingu
- Goal Storm
- Gradius Deluxe Pack
- International Track & Field
- J-League Jikkyō Winning Eleven 97
- Jikkyō Oshaberi Parodius: Forever with Me
- Konami Open Golf
- Lightning Legend
- NFL Full Contact
- Pachinko Dream
- Policenauts
- Policenauts Private Collection
- Project Overkill
- Sexy Parodius
- Snatcher
- Road Rage/Speed King
- Susume! Taisen Puzzle Dama
- Tokimeki Memorial Private Collection
- Tokimeki Memorial Taisen Puzzle-Dama
- Vandal Hearts
1997
- Bottom of the 9th '97
- Breeding Stud: Bokujou de Aimashou
- Broken Helix
- Castlevania: Symphony of the Night
- Crypt Killer
- Goal Storm '97
- Gradius Gaiden
- International Super Star Soccer Pro
- Konami Antiques MSX Collection Vol. 1
- Lethal Enforcers I & II
- Midnight Run
- Nagano Winter Olympics '98
- Paro Wars
- Poy Poy
- Salamander Deluxe Pack Plus
- Tokimeki Memorial Drama Series Vol. 1: Nijiiro no Seishun
- Tokimeki Memorial Selection: Fujisaki Shiori
- Tokimeki Memorial Taisen Tokkae Dama
1998
- Azure Dreams
- Bishi Bashi Special
- Bottom of the 9th '99
- Breeding Stud 2
- The Contra Adventure (North America only)
- Dancing Blade Katteni Momotenshi!
- Diver's Dream
- Fisherman's Bait: A Bass Challenge
- Ganbare Goemon: Kuru Nara Koi! Ayashige Ikka no Kuroi Kage
- G.A.S.P!! Fighters' NEXTream
- Hellnight
- International Superstar Soccer '98
- Kensei: Sacred Fist
- Konami Antiques MSX Collection Vol. 2
- Konami Antiques MSX Collection Vol. 3
- Metal Gear Solid
- Mitsumete Knight
- Mitsumete Knight R Daibouken hen
- Nagano Winter Olympics '98
- NBA In The Zone '98
- Poy Poy 2
- Suikoden II
- Tokimeki Memorial Drama Series Vol. 2 Irodori no Love Song
- Tokimeki no Houkago
- TwinBee RPG
- beatmania
- beatmania APPEND 3rdMIX mini
- beatmania APPEND 3rdMIX
- Magical Medical
- Yu-Gi-Oh! Monster Capsule: Breed & Battle
1999
- Bishi Bashi Special 2
- Breeding Stud '99
- Dance Dance Revolution
- Dance Dance Revolution 2ndReMix
- Dance Dance Revolution 2ndReMix Append Club Version Vol.1
- Dance Dance Revolution 2ndReMix Append Club Version Vol.2
- Dancing Blade Katteni Momotenshi II ~Tears of Eden~
- Dancing Stage featuring True Kiss Destination
- Eisei Meijin III
- Fisherman's Bait 2: Big Ol' Bass
- Glint Glitters
- GuitarFreaks
- Gungage
- International Track & Field 2000
- Kinniku Banzuke Vol. 1: Ore ga Saikyou no Otoko
- Konami Arcade Classics
- Melty Lancer: The 3rd Planet
- Metal Gear Solid: VR Missions
- NBA In The Zone '99
- NHL Blades of Steel '99
- Jersey Devil (Japan)
- Silent Hill
- Soul of the Samurai (called Ronin Blade in Europe)
- Tokimeki Memorial 2
- Tokimeki Memorial Drama Series Vol. 3 Tabidachi no Uta
- A Bug's Life (Japan)
- Vandal Hearts II
- Virgin Fleet
- beatmania APPEND GOTTAMIX
- beatmania APPEND 4thMIX
- Tarzan (Japan)
- pop'n music
- pop'n music 2
- Yu-Gi-Oh! True Duel Monsters: Sealed Memories (Japan) / Yu-Gi-Oh! Forbidden Memories (North America & Europe)
- Glint Glitters
- Goo! Goo! Soundy
- Harlem Beat: You're the One
2000
- Aitakute... Your Smiles in My Heart
- Bishi Bashi Special 3: Step Champ
- Dance Dance Revolution 3rdMix
- Dance Dance Revolution Best Hits
- Dance Dance Revolution Disney's Rave
- Dancing Stage EuroMix (Europe)
- Dancing Stage EuroMix (Australia)
- Dancing Stage featuring Dreams Come True
- Eldergate
- ESPN Great Outdoor Games: Bass Fishing
- ESPN MLS GameNight
- Fisherman's Bait 3
- The Grinch
- Hunter X Hunter: Maboroshi no Greed Island
- ISS Pro Evolution
- Kinniku Banzuke: Road to Sasuke
- Kinniku Banzuke Vol. 2: Aratanarugenkai Enochousen!
- Kinniku Banzuke Vol. 3: Saikyou no Challenger Tanjyou!
- Love Hina: Ai wa Kotoba no Chuu ni
- Love Hina 2: Kotoba wa Konayuki no You ni
- The Mummy
- Nightmare Creatures II
- Oha Star Dance Dance Revolution
- NHL Blades of Steel 2000
- Tokimeki Memorial 2 Substories: Dancing Summer Vacation
- Winning Eleven 2000
- Woody Woodpecker Racing
- beatmania APPEND 5thMIX
- beatmania BEST HITS
- beatmania APPEND ClubMIX
- beatmania APPEND GOTTAMIX2 ~Going Global~
- beatmania (Europe)
- beatmania featuring Dreams Come True
- Gensō Suiko Gaiden Vol. 1: Harmonia no Kenshi
- pop'n music: Animation Melody
- pop'n music: Disney Tunes
- pop'n music 3
- pop'n music 4
- Hyper Pachinko
2001
- Castlevania Chronicles
- Dance Dance Revolution
- Dance Dance Revolution 4thMix
- Dance Dance Revolution 5thMix
- Dance Dance Revolution Disney Mix
- Dancing Stage Disney Mix (Europe)
- Dancing Stage Disney Mix (Australia)
- F1 World Grand Prix 2000
- Ganbare Goemon: Ōedo Daikaiten
- Gensō Suiko Gaiden Vol. 2: Crystal Valley no Kettou
- Goemon: Shin Sedai Shūmei!
- Hunter X Hunter: Ubawareta Aura Stone
- ISS Pro Evolution 2
- beatmania THE SOUND OF TOKYO
- pop'n music 5
- Tekunobībī
- Tokimeki Memorial 2 Substories: Leaping School Festival
- Tokimeki Memorial 2 Substories: Memories Ringing On
- Tokimeki Memorial 2 Taisen Puzzle Dama
2002
- Captain Tsubasa: Aratanaru Densetsu Joshou
- Dance Dance Revolution Konamix
- Dancing Stage Party Edition
- Hikaru no Go: Heian Gensou Ibunroku
- Hikaru no Go: Insei Choujou Kessen
- Kaettekita Cyborg Kuro-Chan
- Martial Beat
- Martial Beat 2
- Mini Moni Dice de Pyon!
- Prince of Tennis
- Prince of Tennis: Sweat & Tears
- Pro Evolution Soccer
- beatmania 6thMIX + CORE REMIX
- pop'n music 6
- Super GALS! Kotobuki Ran Special (Coolmen Get You Gals Party)
- Pro Evolution Soccer 2
- Mini Moni Step Pyon Pyon Pyon
2003
- Dancing Stage Fever (Europe)
- Dancing Stage Fever (Australia)
- Gegege no Kitarō: Ibun Youkaitan
- Pinobee
2004
- Dancing Stage Fusion
Cancelled Games
- Kumite: The Fighter's Edge
- Monster Force
- Pinky & the Brain
- TwinBee Miracle
- Konami Rally

== PlayStation 2 ==
2000
- 7 Blades
- DrumMania
- Bouken Jidai Katsugeki Goemon
- ESPN International Track & Field
- ESPN Winter X-Games Snowboarding
- Gradius III & IV
- Guitar Freaks 3rd Mix & DrumMania 2nd Mix
- Jikkyō Powerful Pro Yakyū 7
- Silent Scope
- Winning Eleven 5
- beatmania IIDX 3rd Style
2001
- Crash Bandicoot: The Wrath of Cortex (distributed by Konami)
- Ephemeral Fantasia
- ESPN MLS ExtraTime
- ESPN NBA 2Night
- ESPN NFL PrimeTime 2002
- ESPN National Hockey Night
- ESPN Winter X-Games Snowboarding 2002
- ESPN X-Games Skateboarding
- Frogger: The Great Quest
- Jikkyō Powerful Pro Yakyū 8
- Metal Gear Solid 2: Sons of Liberty
- ParaParaParadise
- Police 911
- Pro Evolution Soccer (Europe & Australia) / Winning Eleven 5 (Japan, Asia & North America)
- Ring of Red
- Shadow of Memories
- Silent Hill 2
- Silent Scope 2: Dark Silhouette
- Tokimeki Memorial 3
- Yu-Gi-Oh! True Duel Monsters II: Inherited Memories (Japan) / Yu-Gi-Oh! The Duelists of the Roses (North America & Europe)
- Zone of the Enders
- beatmania IIDX 4th Style
- beatmania IIDX 5th Style
- KEYBOARDMANIA
2002
- Contra: Shattered Soldier
- DDRMAX Dance Dance Revolution
- DDRMAX Dance Dance Revolution 6thMix
- ESPN International Winter Sports
- ESPN NBA 2Night 2002
- Evolution Skateboarding
- Evolution Snowboarding
- Jikkyō Powerful Pro Yakyū 9
- K-1 World Grand Prix 2002
- Konami's Moto-X
- NBA Starting Five
- Pro Evolution Soccer 2 (Europe & Australia) / Winning Eleven 6 (Japan, Asia & North America)
- Silent Scope 3
- Suikoden III
- Tokimeki Memorial Girl's Side
- Whiteout
- WTA Tour Tennis
- beatmania IIDX 6th Style
- pop'n music 7
- KEYBOARDMANIA II (2nd & 3rdMIX)
2003
- Castlevania: Lament of Innocence
- DreamMix TV World Fighters
- Dance Dance Revolution Extreme (Japan)
- Dance Dance Revolution Party Collection
- Dancing Stage Fever
- Dancing Stage MegaMix (Europe)
- Dancing Stage MegaMix (Australia)
- DDRMAX2 Dance Dance Revolution
- DDRMAX2 Dance Dance Revolution 7thMix
- Fisherman's Challenge
- Frogger Beyond
- Jikkyō Powerful Pro Yakyū 10
- Metal Gear Solid 2: Substance
- Pro Evolution Soccer 3 (Europe & Australia) / Winning Eleven 7 (Japan, Asia & North America)
- Silent Hill 3
- Teenage Mutant Ninja Turtles
- Tour de France: Centenary Edition
- Winning Eleven 6: Final Evolution (Japan)
- Yu-Gi-Oh! The Duelists of the Roses
- Zone of the Enders: The 2nd Runner
- pop'n music 8
- pop'n music BEST HITS
- Gegege no Kitaro
2004
- Airforce Delta Strike (North America) / Airforce Delta: Blue Wing Knights (Japan) / Deadly Skies III (Europe)
- Cy Girls
- Dance Dance Revolution Extreme (North America)
- Dancing Stage Fusion (Europe)
- Dancing Stage Fusion (Australia)
- DDR Festival Dance Dance Revolution
- Firefighter F.D. 18
- Flame of Recca: Final Burning
- Gradius V
- Crash Nitro Kart (Japan)
- Jikkyō Powerful Pro Yakyū 11
- Lifeline
- Meine Liebe
- Metal Gear Solid 3: Snake Eater
- Neo Contra
- Pro Evolution Soccer 4 (Europe & Australia) / Winning Eleven 8 (Japan, Asia & North America)
- Pro Yakyū Spirits 2004
- Silent Hill 4: The Room
- Suikoden IV
- Teenage Mutant Ninja Turtles 2: Battle Nexus
- U Move Super Sports
- Winning Eleven 7 International (Japan)
- Yu-Gi-Oh! Capsule Monster Coliseum
- Beatmania IIDX 7th Style
- Beatmania IIDX 8th Style
- pop'n music 9
- pop'n music 10
2005
- Castlevania: Curse of Darkness
- Crime Life: Gang Wars
- Dance Dance Revolution Extreme 2
- Dancing Stage Max
- Enthusia Professional Racing
- Gantz: The Game
- Jikkyō Powerful Pro Yakyū 12
- Metal Gear Solid 3: Subsistence
- Nano Breaker
- Pro Evolution Soccer 5 (Europe & Australia) / Winning Eleven 9 (Japan, Asia & North America)
- Pro Yakyū Spirits 2
- Remote Control Dandy SF
- Rumble Roses
- S.L.A.I.: Steel Lancer Arena International
- Suikoden Tactics
- Teenage Mutant Ninja Turtles 3: Mutant Nightmare
- Wallace & Gromit:The Curse Of The Were-Rabbit
- OZ - Over Zenith (Japan) / The Sword of Etheria (Europe)
- Beatmania IIDX 9th Style
- Beatmania IIDX 10th Style
- pop'n music 11
2006
- Dance Dance Revolution Strike
- Dance Dance Revolution SuperNova (North America)
- Jikkyō Powerful Pro Yakyū 13
- Pro Evolution Soccer 6 (Europe & Australia) / Winning Eleven 2007 (North America) / Winning Eleven 10 (Japan & Asia)
- Pro Yakyū Spirits 3
- Suikoden V
- Negima!? 3rd Time
- Beatmania (North America)
- Beatmania IIDX 11: IIDXRED
- Beatmania IIDX 12: Happy Sky
- pop'n music 12: IROHA
- Pop'n Music 13 Carnival
- GuitarFreaks V & DrumMania V
2007
- Dance Dance Revolution SuperNova (Japan)
- Dance Dance Revolution SuperNova 2 (North America)
- Dancing Stage SuperNova
- Flatout 2 (Published in Japan by Konami, published worldwide by Empire Interactive)
- Jikkyō Powerful Pro Yakyū 14
- Jikkyō Powerful Major League 2 (Japan) / MLB Power Pros (North America)
- Negima!? Dreaming Princess
- Pro Evolution Soccer 2008 (Europe, Australia & North America) / Winning Eleven 2008 (Japan & Asia)
- Pro Yakyū Spirits 4
- Beatmania IIDX 13: Distorted
- pop'n music 14: FEVER!
- Yu-Gi-Oh! Duel Monsters GX: Tag Force Evolution (Japan) / Yu-Gi-Oh! GX: Tag Force Evolution (Europe) / Yu-Gi-Oh! GX: The Beginning of Destiny (North America)
2008
- Dance Dance Revolution Disney Channel Edition
- Dance Dance Revolution SuperNova 2 (Japan)
- Dance Dance Revolution X (North America)
- Jikkyō Powerful Pro Yakyū 15
- Jikkyō Powerful Major League 3 (Japan) / MLB Power Pros 2008 (North America)
- Pro Evolution Soccer 2009 (Europe, Australia & North America) / Winning Eleven 2009 (Japan & Asia)
- Pro Yakyū Spirits 5
- Silent Hill: Origins
- Beatmania IIDX 14: Gold
- Beatmania IIDX 15: DJ Troopers
2009
- Dance Dance Revolution X (Japan)
- J-League Winning Eleven 2009 Club Championship
- Jikkyō Powerful Pro Yakyū 2009
- Jikkyō Powerful Major League 2009
- Pro Evolution Soccer 2010 (Europe, Australia & North America) / Winning Eleven 2010 (Japan & Asia)
- Pro Yakyū Spirits 6
- beatmania IIDX 16: Empress + Premium Best
2010
- Silent Hill: Shattered Memories
- Pro Yakyū Spirits 2010
- Pro Evolution Soccer 2011 (Europe, Australia & North America) / Winning Eleven 2011 (Japan & Asia)
2011
- Pro Evolution Soccer 2012 (Europe, Australia & North America) / Winning Eleven 2012 (Japan & Asia)
- Pro Yakyū Spirits 2011
2012
- Pro Evolution Soccer 2013 (Europe, Australia & North America) / Winning Eleven 2013 (Japan & Asia)
2013
- Pro Evolution Soccer 2014 (Europe, Australia & North America) / Winning Eleven 2014 (Japan & Asia)

== PlayStation 3 ==
2006
- Mahjong Fight Club
2007
- Pro Evolution Soccer 2008 (Europe, Australia & North America) / Winning Eleven 2008 (Japan & Asia)
- Pro Yakyū Spirits 4
2008
- American Idol
- Hellboy: Science of Evil (North America & Europe)
- Metal Gear Solid 4: Guns of the Patriots
- Metal Gear Online
- Pro Evolution Soccer 2009 (Europe, Australia & North America) / Winning Eleven 2009 (Japan & Asia)
- Pro Yakyū Spirits 5
- Silent Hill: Homecoming
2009
- Pro Yakyū Spirits 6
- Pro Evolution Soccer 2010 (Europe, Australia & North America) / Winning Eleven 2010 (Japan & Asia)
- Tornado Outbreak
2010
- Saw: The Video Game
- Saw II: Flesh & Blood
- Castlevania: Lords of Shadow
- Pro Evolution Soccer 2011 (Europe, Australia & North America) / Winning Eleven 2011 (Japan & Asia)
- Def Jam Rapstar
- Jikkyō Powerful Pro Yakyū 2010
- Pro Yakyū Spirits 2010
- Dance Dance Revolution
- No More Heroes: Heroes' Paradise
2011
- El Shaddai: Ascension of the Metatron (Europe only)
- Jikkyō Powerful Pro Yakyū 2011
- Pro Yakyū Spirits 2011
- Metal Gear Solid HD Collection
- Pro Evolution Soccer 2012 (Europe, Australia & North America) / Winning Eleven 2012 (Japan & Asia)
- Ra.One (Europe & Japan)
2012
- Birds of Steel
- Blades of Time
- Jikkyō Powerful Pro Yakyū 2012
- Silent Hill: Downpour
- Pro Yakyū Spirits 2012
- NeverDead
- Silent Hill HD Collection
- Zone of the Enders HD Collection
- Doctor Who: The Eternity Clock
- Pro Evolution Soccer 2013 (Europe, Australia & North America) / Winning Eleven 2013 (Japan & Asia)
2013
- Jikkyō Powerful Pro Yakyū 2013
- Metal Gear Rising: Revengeance
- Pro Yakyū Spirits 2013
- Pro Evolution Soccer 2014 (Europe, Australia & North America) / Winning Eleven 2014 (Japan & Asia)
- The Snowman and the Snowdog (Europe, Australia, USA, Japan & Asia)
2014
- Castlevania: Lords of Shadow 2
- Jikkyō Powerful Pro Yakyū 2014
- Pro Yakyū Spirits 2014
- Metal Gear Solid V: Ground Zeroes
- Pro Evolution Soccer 2015 (Europe, Australia & North America) / Winning Eleven 2015 (Japan & Asia)
2015
- Pro Yakyū Spirits 2015
- Metal Gear Solid V: The Phantom Pain
- Pro Evolution Soccer 2016 (Europe, Australia & North America) / Winning Eleven 2016 (Japan & Asia)
2016
- Jikkyō Powerful Pro Yakyū 2016
- Pro Evolution Soccer 2017 (Europe, Australia & North America) / Winning Eleven 2017 (Japan & Asia)
2017
- Jikkyō Powerful Pro Yakyū Championship 2017
- Pro Evolution Soccer 2018 (Europe, Australia & North America) / Winning Eleven 2018 (Japan & Asia)

=== PlayStation Network ===
- Castlevania: Harmony of Despair
- Detana!! TwinBee
- GTI Club+: Rally Côte d'Azur
- Yu-Gi-Oh! 5D's Decade Duels
- Yu-Gi-Oh! Legacy of the Duelist
- Yu-Gi-Oh! Millenium Duels (North America only)
- Zombie Apocalypse

== PlayStation 4 ==
2014
- Metal Gear Solid V: Ground Zeroes
- Pro Evolution Soccer 2015 (Europe, Australia & North America) / World Soccer Winning Eleven 2015 (Japan & Asia)
2015
- Metal Gear Solid V: The Phantom Pain
- Pro Evolution Soccer 2016 (Europe, Australia, North America & Asia) / Winning Eleven 2016 (Japan)
2016
- Jikkyō Powerful Pro Yakyū 2016
- Pro Evolution Soccer 2017 (Europe, Australia, North America & Asia) / Winning Eleven 2017 (Japan)
2017
- Pro Evolution Soccer 2018 (Europe, Australia, North America & Asia) / Winning Eleven 2018 (Japan)
2018
- Jikkyō Powerful Pro Yakyū 2018
- Mantis Burn Racing (physical format in Japan only)
- Metal Gear Survive
- Pro Evolution Soccer 2019 (Europe, Australia, North America & Asia) / Winning Eleven 2019 (Japan)
- Super Bomberman R (Co-developed with HexaDrive)
- Zone of the Enders: The 2nd Runner MARS (Europe, Australia & North America) / Anubis: Zone of The Enders MARS (Japan & Asia)
2019
- Arcade Classics Anniversary Collection
- Castlevania Anniversary Collection (Developed by M2)
- Contra Anniversary Collection (Developed by M2)
- Contra: Rogue Corps (Developed by Toylogic)
- eFootball PES 2020 (Europe, Australia, North America & Asia) / eFootball Winning Eleven 2020 (Japan)
- Pro Yakyū Spirits 2019
2020
- eBaseball Powerful Pro Baseball 2020
- eFootball PES 2021 Season Update
- Skelattack (Developed by Ukuza)
2021
- Super Bomberman R Online
- eFootball
- Castlevania Advance Collection (Developed by M2)
2022
- eBaseball Powerful Pro Yakyū 2022
- Teenage Mutant Ninja Turtles: The Cowabunga Collection (Developed by Digital Eclipse)
2023
- Super Bomberman R 2 (Co-developed with HexaDrive)
- WBSC eBASEBALL: Power Pros
- Metal Gear Solid: Master Collection (Co-developed with M2 and Rocket Studio)
- Super Crazy Rhythm Castle (Developed by Second Impact Games)
2024
- Contra: Operation Galuga (Developed by WayForward)
- Felix the Cat Collection (Developed by Limited Run Games)
- Rocket Knight Adventures: Re-Sparked! (Developed by Limited Run Games)
- Powerful Pro Baseball Eikan Nine Crossroad
- Powerful Pro Baseball 2024-2025
2025
- Ninja Five-O (Developed by Limited Run Games)
- Suikoden I & II HD Remaster Gate Rune and Dunan Unification Wars
2026
- Powerful Pro Baseball 2026-2027

== PlayStation 5 ==
2021
- eFootball
2022
- Teenage Mutant Ninja Turtles: The Cowabunga Collection (Developed by Digital Eclipse)
- Yu-Gi-Oh! Master Duel
2023
- Super Bomberman R 2 (Co-developed with HexaDrive)
- Metal Gear Solid Master Collection: Vol. 1 (Co-developed with M2 and Rocket Studio)
- Super Crazy Rhythm Castle (Developed by Second Impact Games)
2024
- Silent Hill: The Short Message (Co-developed with HexaDrive)
- Contra: Operation Galuga (Developed by WayForward)
- Rocket Knight Adventures: Re-Sparked! (Developed by Limited Run Games)
- Felix the Cat Collection (Developed by Limited Run Games)
- CYGNI: All Guns Blazing (Developed by KeelWorks)
- Castlevania Dominus Collection (Developed by M2)
- Professional Baseball Spirits 2024-2025
- Silent Hill 2 (Developed by Bloober Team)
2025
- Ninja Five-O (Developed by Limited Run Games)
- Suikoden I & II HD Remaster Gate Rune and Dunan Unification Wars
- Deliver At All Costs (Developed by Far Out Games)
- Edens Zero
- Gradius Origins (Developed by M2)
- Metal Gear Solid Delta: Snake Eater (Co-developed with Virtuos)
- Silent Hill f (Developed by NeoBards Entertainment)
2026
- Super Bomberman Collection (Developed by Red Art Games)
- Darwin's Paradox! (Developed by ZDT Studios)
- Ganbare Goemon! Daishūgō (Developed by M2)
- Metal Gear Solid Master Collection Vol. 2 (Co-developed with M2, Virtuos and logicalbeat)
- Castlevania: Belmont's Curse (Co-developed by Motion Twin and Evil Empire)
- Silent Hill: Townfall (Developed by Screen Burn Interactive, co-published with Annapurna Interactive)
- eBaseball: PRO SPIRIT
2027
- Rev. NOiR
TBD
- Rhapsody In Scarlet

== X68000 ==
1986
- Salamander
- TwinBee
1987
- Gradius
1989
- A Jax
1990
- Quarth
1991
- Parodius Da!
- Detana!! TwinBee
1992
- Gradius II
- Nama Baseball '68
1993
- Akumajō Dracula
- Nemesis '90 Kai

== PC Engine ==
1991
- Gradius
- Salamander
1992
- Parodius Da!
- Detana!! Twinbee
Cancelled Games
- Battle Jungler

== PC-Engine (Super CD-ROM²) ==
1992
- Gradius II: Gofer no Yabō
- Snatcher
1993
- Akumajou Dracula X: Chi no Rondo
- Martial Champion
1994
- Tokimeki Memorial

== Xbox ==
2001
- Airforce Delta Storm (North America) / Airforce Delta II (Japan) / Deadly Skies (Europe)
- Silent Hill 2: Restless Dreams (North America)
2002
- Crash Bandicoot: The Wrath of Cortex (distributed by Konami)
- ESPN NFL PrimeTime 2002
- Metal Gear Solid 2: Substance
- Shadow of Memories (Europe only)
- Silent Hill 2: Inner Fears (Europe)
- Whiteout
2003
- Dance Dance Revolution Ultramix (North American release)
- Teenage Mutant Ninja Turtles
2004
- Dance Dance Revolution Ultramix (North America)
- Dance Dance Revolution Ultramix 2
- Dancing Stage Unleashed
- Pro Evolution Soccer 4 (Europe & Australia) / Winning Eleven 8 International (North America)
- Silent Hill 4: The Room
- Silent Scope Complete
- Teenage Mutant Ninja Turtles 2: Battle Nexus
- Yu-Gi-Oh! The Dawn of Destiny
2005
- Castlevania: Curse of Darkness
- Dance Dance Revolution Ultramix 3
- Dancing Stage Unleashed 2
- Teenage Mutant Ninja Turtles 3: Mutant Nightmare
- Teenage Mutant Ninja Turtles: Mutant Melee
- Pro Evolution Soccer 5 (Europe & Australia) / Winning Eleven 9 (North America)
2006
- Dance Dance Revolution Ultramix 4
- Dancing Stage Unleashed 2

== Xbox 360 ==
2006
- Bomberman: Act Zero (Japan, North America & Europe)
- Pro Evolution Soccer 6 (Europe & Australia) / Winning Eleven 2007 (North America) / Winning Eleven X (Japan & Asia)
- Pro Yakyū Spirits 3
- Rumble Roses XX (Japan, North America & Europe)
2007
- Dance Dance Revolution Universe (North America)
- Dance Dance Revolution Universe 2 (North America)
- Dancing Stage Universe (Europe)
- Pro Evolution Soccer 2008 (Europe, Australia & North America) / Winning Eleven 2008 (Japan & Asia)
2008
- Dance Dance Revolution Universe 3 (North America)
- Hellboy: The Science of Evil (North America & Europe)
- Otomedius Gorgeous
- Pro Evolution Soccer 2009 (Europe, Australia & North America) / Winning Eleven 2009 (Japan & Asia)
- Silent Hill: Homecoming
2009
- Dance Dance Revolution Universe 3 Chinese Music Special Edition (Asia)
- Pro Evolution Soccer 2010 (Europe, Australia & North America) / Winning Eleven 2010 (Japan & Asia)
- Saw: The Video Game
- Tornado Outbreak
2010
- Adrenalin Misfits
- Castlevania: Lords of Shadow
- Def Jam Rapstar
- Dance Masters (North America) / DanceEvolution (Europe, Australia & Japan)
- Ninety-Nine Nights II
- No More Heroes: Heroes' Paradise
- Pro Evolution Soccer 2011 (Europe, Australia & North America) / Winning Eleven 2011 (Japan & Asia)
- Saw II: Flesh & Blood
2011
- El Shaddai: Ascension of the Metatron (Europe only)
- Dance Dance Revolution
- Metal Gear Solid HD Collection
- Otomedius Excellent
- Pro Evolution Soccer 2012 (Europe, Australia & North America) / Winning Eleven 2012 (Japan & Asia)
2012
- Birds of Steel
- Blades of Time
- NeverDead
- Pro Evolution Soccer 2013 (Europe, Australia & North America) / Winning Eleven 2013 (Japan & Asia)
- Silent Hill: Downpour
- Silent Hill HD Collection
- Zone of the Enders HD Collection
2013
- Metal Gear Rising: Revengeance
- Pro Evolution Soccer 2014 (Europe, Australia & North America) / Winning Eleven 2014 (Japan & Asia)
2014
- Castlevania: Lords of Shadow 2
- Metal Gear Solid V: Ground Zeroes
- Pro Evolution Soccer 2015 (Europe, Australia & North America) / Winning Eleven 2015 (Japan & Asia)
2015
- Metal Gear Solid V: The Phantom Pain
- Pro Evolution Soccer 2016 (Europe, Australia & North America) / Winning Eleven 2016 (Japan & Asia)
2016
- Pro Evolution Soccer 2017 (Europe, Australia & North America) / Winning Eleven 2017 (Japan & Asia)
2017
- Pro Evolution Soccer 2018 (Europe, Australia & North America) / Winning Eleven 2018 (Japan & Asia)

=== Xbox Live Arcade ===
- BurgerTime World Tour
- Castlevania: Harmony of Despair
- Castlevania: Symphony of the Night
- Coffeetime Crosswords
- Contra
- Frogger
- Frogger 2
- Frogger: Hyper Arcade Edition
- Gyruss
- Leedmees
- Rhythm Party
- Rush'n Attack
- Rush'n Attack: Ex-Patriot
- Scramble
- Skullgirls
- Super Contra
- Teenage Mutant Ninja Turtles
- Time Pilot
- Track & Field
- The Simpsons
- Vandal Hearts: Flames of Judgment
- Yie Ar Kung Fu
- Yu-Gi-Oh! 5D's: Decade Duels
- Yu-Gi-Oh! Legacy of the Duelist
- Yu-Gi-Oh! Millenium Duels
- X-Men
- Zombie Apocalypse

== Xbox One ==
2014
- Metal Gear Solid V: Ground Zeroes
- Pro Evolution Soccer 2015 (Europe, Australia & North America) / Winning Eleven 2015 (Japan & Asia)
2015
- Yu-Gi-Oh! Legacy of the Duelist
- Metal Gear Solid V: The Phantom Pain
- Pro Evolution Soccer 2016 (Europe, Australia & North America) / Winning Eleven 2016 (Japan & Asia)
2016
- Pro Evolution Soccer 2017 (Europe, Australia & North America) / Winning Eleven 2017 (Japan & Asia)
2017
- Pro Evolution Soccer 2018 (Europe, Australia & North America) / Winning Eleven 2018 (Japan & Asia)
2018
- Metal Gear Survive
- Pro Evolution Soccer 2019 (Europe, Australia & North America) / Winning Eleven 2019 (Japan & Asia)
- Super Bomberman R
2019
- Arcade Classics Anniversary Collection
- Castlevania Anniversary Collection
- Contra Anniversary Collection
- Contra: Rogue Corps
- eFootball PES 2020
2020
- Skelattack
2021
- Super Bomberman R Online
- eFootball
- Castlevania Advance Collection
2022
- Yu-Gi-Oh! Master Duel
- Teenage Mutant Ninja Turtles: The Cowabunga Collection
2023
- Super Bomberman R 2
- Super Crazy Rhythm Castle
2024
- Contra: Operation Galuga
2025
- Suikoden I & II HD Remaster Gate Rune and Dunan Unification Wars

== Xbox Series X/S ==
2021
- eFootball
2022
- Yu-Gi-Oh! Master Duel
- Teenage Mutant Ninja Turtles: The Cowabunga Collection
2023
- Super Bomberman R 2
- Metal Gear Solid: Master Collection Vol. 1
- Super Crazy Rhythm Castle
2024
- Contra: Operation Galuga
- CYGNI: All Guns Blazing
- Castlevania Dominus Collection
2025
- Suikoden I & II HD Remaster Gate Rune and Dunan Unification Wars
- Deliver At All Costs
- Edens Zero
- Gradius Origins
- Metal Gear Solid Delta: Snake Eater
- Silent Hill f
2026
- Super Bomberman Collection
- Darwin's Paradox!
- Metal Gear Solid Master Collection Vol. 2
- Castlevania: Belmont’s Curse
2027
- Rev. NOiR
TBD
- Rhapsody In Scarlet

== Game Boy ==
1989
- The Castlevania Adventure
- Motocross Maniacs
1990
- Quarth
- NFL Football
- Skate or Die: Bad 'n Rad
- Nemesis
- Pop'n TwinBee
- Teenage Mutant Ninja Turtles: Fall of the Foot Clan
1991
- Operation C
- Bill Elliott's NASCAR Challenge
- Double Dribble
- Cave Noire
- Castlevania II: Belmont's Revenge
- Parodius
- Blades of Steel
- Nemesis II (called Gradius: The Interstellar Assault in North America.)
- Ganbare Goemon: Sarawareta Ebisumaru!
1992
- Star Trek 25th Anniversary
- Teenage Mutant Ninja Turtles II: Back from the Sewers
- Track and Field
- World Circuit Series
- Ultra Golf
- Nanonote
- Tiny Toon Adventures: Babs' Big Break
1993
- Zen: Intergalactic Ninja
- Tiny Toon Adventures 2: Montana's Movie Madness
- Top Gun: Guts and Glory
- Kid Dracula
- Raging Fighter
- Batman: The Animated Series
- Teenage Mutant Ninja Turtles III: Radical Rescue
- God Medicine
1994
- Contra: The Alien Wars
- Tiny Toon Adventures: Wacky Sports Challenge
1995
- Animaniacs
1997
- Castlevania Legends
- Mystical Ninja Starring Goemon
- Konami GB Collection Vol.1
- Konami GB Collection Vol.2
1998
- Konami GB Collection Vol.3
- Konami GB Collection Vol.4
- International Superstar Soccer
- Power Pro GB
- BakuchChō Retrieve Master
- Koukiatsu Boy
- Yu-Gi-Oh! Duel Monsters

== Game Boy Color ==
1998
- Yu-Gi-Oh! Duel Monsters
1999
- Azure Dreams
- Beat Breaker
- beatmania GB
- beatmania GB2 Gotcha Mix
- Bullet Battlers
- International Rally
- International Superstar Soccer 99
- International Track & Field
- Kinniku Banzuke GB
- Ganbare Goemon: Mononoke Sugoroku
- Motocross Maniacs 2
- NBA In The Zone
- NBA In The Zone 2000
- NHL Blades of Steel
- Owarai Yoiko No Game Dou: Oyaji Sagashite 3 Choume
- Pocket G1 Stable
- Power Pro Kun Pocket
- Spawn
- Survival Kids
- Tokimeki Memorial Pocket Culture Hen
- Tokimeki Memorial Pocket Sport Hen
- Yu-Gi-Oh! Duel Monsters II: Dark Duel Stories
2000
- Airforce Delta
- Battle Fishers
- beatmania GB Gotcha Mix 2
- Cyborg Kuro Chan
- Cyborg Kuro Chan 2
- Dance Dance Revolution GB
- Dance Dance Revolution GB2
- ESPN International Track & Field
- ESPN National Hockey Night
- Ganbare Goemon: Hoshizorashi Dynamites Arawaru!!
- beatmania GB Gotcha Mix 2
- The Grinch
- Hunter X Hunter: Hunter no Keifu
- International Rally
- International Superstar Soccer 2000
- Kinniku Banzuke GB2
- Metal Gear: Ghost Babel
- Millennium Winter Sports
- The Mummy
- NHL Blades of Steel 2000
- pop'n music GB
- pop'n music GB: Animated Melody
- pop'n music GB: Disney Tunes
- Power Pro Kun Pocket 2
- Survival Kids 2: Dasshutsu! Futago Shima
- Woody Woodpecker Racing
- Yu-Gi-Oh! Duel Monsters III: Tri-Holy God Advent
- Yu-Gi-Oh! Duel Monsters 4: Battle of the Powerful Duelists – Jounouchi Deck
- Yu-Gi-Oh! Duel Monsters 4: Battle of the Powerful Duelists – Kaiba Deck
- Yu-Gi-Oh! Duel Monsters 4: Battle of the Powerful Duelists – Yugi Deck
- Yu-Gi-Oh! Monster Capture GB
2001
- Super GALS! Kotobuki Ran
- Super GALS! Kotobuki Ran 2
- Battle Fishers
- Dance Dance Revolution GB3
- Dance Dance Revolution GB Disney Mix
- Gyouten Ningen Batseelor – Doctor Guy no Yabou
- Hunter X Hunter: Kindan no Hihou
- Kinniku Banzuke GB 3
- Net de Get: Mini-Game @ 100
- Oha Star Dance Dance Revolution GB

== Game Boy Advance ==
2001
- Adventure of Tokyo Disney Sea
- Castlevania: Circle of the Moon
- ESPN Final Round Golf 2002
- ESPN X Games Skateboarding
- Field of Nine: Digital Edition 2001
- Flame of Recca: THE GAME
- Frogger's Adventures: Temple of the Frog
- Gadget Racers
- Gensō Suikoden Card Stories
- GetBackers Dakkanya: Jigoku no Scaramouche
- Gradius Galaxies
- International Superstar Soccer
- J.League Pocket
- JGTO Golf Master Mobile
- Jurassic Park III: Island Attack
- Jurassic Park III: Park Builder
- Jurassic Park III: The DNA Factor
- Kinniku Banzuke: Kimeru! Kiseki no Kanzen Seiha
- Kinniku Banzuke: Kongou-Kun no Daibouken!
- Konami Krazy Racers
- Mobile Pro Yakyuu: Kantoku no Saihai
- Monster Guardians
- Play Novel: Silent Hill
- Power Pro Kun Pocket 3
- Starcom: Star Communicator
- Tanbi Musou Meine Liebe
- Yu-Gi-Oh! Dungeon Dice Monsters
- Yu-Gi-Oh! Duel Monsters 5: Expert 1
- Yu-Gi-Oh! Duel Monsters 6: Expert 2
- Yuujou no Victory Goal 4v4 Arashi: Get the Goal!
- Zone of the Enders: The Fist of Mars
2002
- Animal Mania: Dokidoki Aishou Check
- Beast Shooter: Mezase Beast King
- Captain Tsubasa: Eikou no Kiseki
- Croket! Yume no Banker Survival!
- ESPN Great Outdoor Games: Bass 2002
- ESPN International Winter Sports 2002
- ESPN X Games Snowboarding
- Groove Adventure Rave: Hikari to Yami no Daikessen
- J.League Pocket 2
- J-League Winning Eleven Advance 2002
- K-1 Pocket Grand Prix
- K-1 Pocket Grand Prix 2
- Kami no Kijutsu: Illusion of the Evil Eyes
- Mail de Cute
- Monster Gate
- Motocross Maniacs Advance
- Power Pro Kun Pocket 4
- Rave Master: Special Attack Force
- WTA Tour Tennis
- Castlevania: Harmony of Dissonance
- Contra Advance: The Alien Wars
- Disney Sports Soccer
- Frogger Advance: The Great Quest
- Frogger's Adventure 2: The Lost Wand
- Disney Sports Skateboarding
- Disney Sports Snowboarding
- Disney Sports Basketball
- Disney Sports Motocross
- Goemon: New Age Shutsudou!
- Konami Collector Series: Arcade Advanced
- Silent Scope
- Airforce Delta Storm
- Crash Bandicoot: The Huge Adventure (Published and distributed along with Universal Interactive for the Japanese release.)
- Spyro: Season of Ice (Published and distributed along with Universal Interactive for the Japanese release.)
- Tennis no Oji-Sama: Aim at the Victory!
- Tennis no Oji-Sama: Genius Boys Academy
- Wagamama * Fairy: Mirumo de Pon! Ougon Maracas no Densetsu
- Isseki Hacchou: Kore 1-pon de 8 Shurui!
- Bass Tsuri Shiyouze!: Tournament wa Senryaku da!
- Shaman King Chou Senjiryakketsu 2
- Shaman King Chou Senjiryakketsu 3
- World Soccer Winning Eleven
- Yu-Gi-Oh! Duel Monsters 7: The Duelcity Legend
- Mini Moni: Onegai Ohoshi-sama!
2003
- Ashita no Joe Makkani Moeagare!
- Croket! 2: Yami no Bank to Ban Joou
- Croket! 3: Granyuu Oukoku no Nazo
- Frogger's Journey: The Forgotten Relic
- Gegege no Kitarou: Kiki Ippatsu! Youkai Rettou
- GetBackers Dakkanya: Jagan Fuuin!
- GetBackers Dakkanya: Metropolis Dakkan Sakusen!
- Hunter X Hunter: Minna Tomodachi Daisakusen!!
- International Superstar Soccer Advance
- Mermaid Melody Pichi Pichi Pitch
- Mermaid Melody Pichi Pichi Pitch Pichi Pichi Party
- Minna no Ouji-Sama
- Monster Gate 2: Dai Inaru Dungeon
- Mugenborg
- Power Pro Kun Pocket 5
- Power Pro Kun Pocket 6
- Yu-Gi-Oh! Reshef of Destruction
- Yu-Gi-Oh! Worldwide Edition: Stairway to the Destined Duel
- Sengoku Kakumei Gaiden
- Tantei Gakuen Q: Meitantei Hakimida!
- Teenage Mutant Ninja Turtles
- Tennis no Oji-Sama 2003: Cool Blue
- Tennis no Oji-Sama 2003: Passion Red
- Ninja Five-O
- Castlevania: Aria of Sorrow
- Boktai: The Sun Is in Your Hand
- Crash Bandicoot 2: N-Tranced (Published and distributed along with Universal Interactive for the Japanese release.)
- Wagamama * Fairy: Mirumo de Pon! Hachinin no Toki no Yousei
- Wagamama * Fairy: Mirumo de Pon! Taisen Mahoudama
- Whistle! Dai 37-kai Tokyo-to Chuugakkou Sougou Taiiku Soccer Taikai
2004
- TMNT 2: Battle Nexus
- Boktai 2: Solar Boy Django
- Croket! Great Jikuu no Boukensha
- Croket! 4: Bank no Mori no Mamorigami
- Genseishin Justirisers: Souchaku! Chikyuu no Senshitachi
- Get Ride! AMDriver: Senkou no Hero Tanjou
- Get Ride! AMDriver: Shutsugeki! Battle Party
- Mermaid Melody Pichi Pichi Pitch Pichi Pichitto Live Start
- Power Pro Kun Pocket 1+2
- Power Pro Kun Pocket 7
- Pyuu to Fuku! Jaguar: Byuu to Deru! Megane-Kun
- Crash Nitro Kart (Published and distributed along with Universal Interactive for the Japanese release.)
- Shaman King: Master of Spirits
- Tantei Gakuen Q: Kyuukyoku no Trick ni Idome!
- Tennis no Oji-Sama 2004: Glorious Gold
- Tennis no Oji-Sama 2004: Stylish Silver
- Wagamama * Fairy: Mirumo de Pon! Nazo no Kagi to Shinjitsu no Tobira
- Wagamama * Fairy: Mirumo de Pon! Yume no Kakera
- Yu-Gi-Oh! Duel Monsters Begineers Pack
- Yu-Gi-Oh! Duel Monsters Expert 3
- Yu-Gi-Oh! Duel Monsters International 2 (Japan) / Yu-Gi-Oh! 7 Trials to Glory: World Championship Tournament 2005 (North America) / Yu-Gi-Oh! Day of the Duelist: World Championship Tournament 2005 (Europe)
- Yu-Gi-Oh! Sugoroku's Board Game
2005
- Animal Yokochou: Doki*Doki Kyushutsu Daisakusen! no Maki
- Boktai: Sabata's Counterattack
- Kappa no Kai-Kata: Katan Daibouken
- Mar Heaven: Knockin' on Heaven's Door
- Shaman King: Legacy of the Spirits
- Shaman King: Master of Spirits 2
- Kessakusen! Ganbare Goemon 1+2: Yukihime to Magginesu
- Wagamama * Fairy: Mirumo de Pon! DokiDoki Memorial Panic
- Winx Club
- Yu-Gi-Oh! Duel Monsters GX: Aim to be Duel King! (Japan) / Yu-Gi-Oh! GX: Duel Academy (North America)
2006
- Animal Yokochou: Shinkyuu Shiken! no Kan
- Power Pocket Dash
- Winx Club: Quest for the Codex
- Yu-Gi-Oh! Duel Monsters Expert 2006 (Japan) / Yu-Gi-Oh! Ultimate Masters: World Championship Tournament 2006 (North America) / Yu-Gi-Oh World Championship Tournament 2006 (Europe)
- Yu-Gi-Oh! World Championship 2006 Set

== Mobile (browser) ==
2010
- Dragon Collection (GREE)
- Sengoku Collection (Mobage)
2011
- Busou Shinki BATTLE COMMUNICATION (Mobage)
- Crows x Worst: Saikyō Densetsu (GREE)
- Hisho Collection (GREE)
- Pro Baseball Dream Nine (GREE/Mobage)
2012
- Crows x Worst: Kenka Retsuden (Mobage)
- J-League Dream Legends (Mobage)
- Pro Baseball Dream Nine (mixi)
- StarWars Collection (GREE)
- StarWars Collection: Jedi vs Sith (GREE)
- World Soccer Collection (GREE/Mobage)
2013
- Hisho Collection: Doki Doki Himitsu no Syachō-shitsu (Mobage)

== iOS/iPadOS ==
2008
- Frogger
- Silent Hill: The Escape
2009
- Dance Dance Revolution S / Lite / S+
- Metal Gear Solid Touch
- Tomena Sanner
- Power Pros Touch
- Krazy Kart Racing
2010
- Mahjong Fight Club Touch
- Castlevania Puzzle: Encore of the Night
- Draw Parking
- Wire Way
- Double Dribble Fastbreak
- Power Pros Touch 2010
- Elebits Capture
- Frogger Inferno
- Hyper Sports Winter
- Hyper Sports Track & Field
- jubeat plus
2011
- Alcatraz Breakout
- Power Pros Touch 2011
- Frogger Free
- Frogger Decades
- Kid vs Kat: Kat Attack
- Pro Baseball Dream Nine
- REFLEC BEAT plus (Japan)
- Gesundheit!
- X-Men
- Frogger Pinball
2012
- Dragon Collection
- Metal Gear Solid: Social Ops
- Million Paradise
- Monster Retsuden Oreca Battle
- Power Pros Touch 2012
- REFLEC BEAT + (WorldWide)
2013
- MLB Dream Nine Mobile
- Slot Revolution
- Domo Jump
- DraColle & Poker
- GITADORA
- LINE GoGo! TwinBee
- Tokimeki Restaurant
- DanceDanceRevolution Pocket Edition
- Super Slot Stars
- Star Soldier for GREE
- Star Wars: Force Collection
- PES Manager
- Pop 'n Rhythmin
- Power Pros Touch 2013
- Star Soldier for GREE
- Quiz Magic Academy SP
2014
- Bomberman
- Dragon Collection RPG: Shōnen to Ryū-gari no Ryū
- Dragon Dice
- Saru Pyon!
- Shin Prince of Tennis: Puzzle & Tennis
- Sudoku: Daily Challenge
- Swords & Poker Adventures
- Min'na de bishibashi
- Nisekoi Majikore!?
- Power Pros Touch 2014)
- Power Pros
- Yu-Gi-Oh! Duel Generation
2015
- Crows x Worst Dynamite
- Crows x Worst V
- Pes Club Manager
- UEFA Champions League PES Flick
- Chronos Ring
- Kingdom Dragonion
- Kyoshin Sensō)
- Pro Yakyū Spirits A
2016
- VS! Bomberman
- Jikkyō Powerful Soccer
- Yu-Gi-Oh! Duel Links
2017
- PES 2017 – Pro Evolution Soccer
2018
- Quiz Magic Academy: Lost Fantasium
- Tokimeki Idol
- Weekly Shōnen Jump: Jikkyō Janjan Stadium
- Pixel Puzzle Collection (Worldwide) / Picroji Puzzle (Japan)
2019
- Dankira!!! Boys, be DANCING!
- Castlevania Grimoire of Souls
- Love Plus EVERY
- Frogger in Toy Town
- beatmania IIDX ULTIMATE MOBILE
2020
- Castlevania: Symphony of the Night
2021
- Pawapuro Puzzle
- Yu-Gi-Oh! Master Duel
- Yu-Gi-Oh! Cross Duel
2022
- Frogger and the Rumbling Ruins
- Amazing Bomberman
- Edens Zero: Pocket Galaxy
2023
- Powerful Pro Baseball Eikan Nine Crossroad
2024
- eBaseball: MLB PRO SPIRIT
2026
- Combine Me!
- Power Pros Adventures
TBD
- Sound Voltex ULTIMATE MOBILE
- DanceDanceRevolution ULTIMATE MOBILE
- Busou Shinki R
- Suikoden STAR LEAP
- Wai Wai World Craft

== Android ==
2010
- Mobile Powerful Pro Baseball 3D
- Krazy Kart Racing
2011
- X-Men
2012
- Ash
- KPE Dream Master
- Metal Gear Solid: Social Ops)
- Mobile Power Pros 2012 for au Smart Pass
- Quiz Magic Academy SP
- Pro Baseball Dream Nine (d game)
- World Soccer Collection (d game)
2013
- Star Wars: Force Collection
- Mobile Power Pros 2013 for au Smart Pass
- LINE GoGo! TwinBee
- Tokimeki Restaurant
2014
- Bomberman
- Crows x Worst: Gekitō Retsuden (d game)
- Min'na de bishibashi
- Dragon Collection RPG: Shōnen to Ryū-gari no Ryū
- Mobile Power Pros 2014 for au Smart Pass
- Monsurobatoru
- Nisekoi Majikore!?
- Shin Prince of Tennis: Puzzle & Tennis
- Power Pros
2015
- Crows x Worst Dynamite
- Crows x Worst V
- Kingdom Dragonion
- Pro Yakyū Spirits A
2016
- VS! Bomberman
- Jikkyō Powerful Soccer
2017
- Yu-Gi-Oh! Duel Links
- PES 2017 – Pro Evolution Soccer
2018
- Quiz Magic Academy: Lost Fantasium
- Tokimeki Idol
- Weekly Shōnen Jump: Jikkyō Janjan Stadium
- Pixel Puzzle Collection (Worldwide) / Picroji Puzzle (Japan)
2019
- Dankira!!! Boys, be DANCING!
- Castlevania Grimoire of Souls
- Love Plus EVERY
- beatmania IIDX ULTIMATE MOBILE
2020
- Castlevania: Symphony of the Night
2021
- Pawapuro Puzzle
- Yu-Gi-Oh! Master Duel
- Yu-Gi-Oh! Cross Duel
2022
- Edens Zero: Pocket Galaxy
2023
- Powerful Pro Baseball Eikan Nine Crossroad
2024
- Reberu Age ni Sugoku Choudo ī Shima
- eBaseball: MLB PRO SPIRIT
2026
- Combine Me!
- Power Pros Adventures
TBD
- Sound Voltex ULTIMATE MOBILE
- DanceDanceRevolution ULTIMATE MOBILE
- Busou Shinki R
- Suikoden STAR LEAP
- Wai Wai World Craft

== Stadia ==
2020
- Super Bomberman R Online

== Amazon Luna ==
2020
- Castlevania Anniversary Collection
- Contra Anniversary Collection

== Nintendo Switch ==
2017
- Super Bomberman R (Shiny edition included)

2018
- Snake Pass (Digital format in Japan only)
- Mantis Burn Racing (Physical format in Japan only)

2019
- Arcade Classics Anniversary Collection
- Bail or Jail
- Castlevania Anniversary Collection
- Contra Anniversary Collection
- Contra: Rogue Corps
- Jikkyō Powerful Pro Yakyū
- Yu-Gi-Oh! Legacy of the Duelist: Link Evolution

2020
- eBaseball Powerful Pro Baseball 2020
- Skelattack
- Momotaro Dentetsu: Showa, Heisei, Reiwa Mo Teiban!

2021
- Castlevania Advance Collection
- Solomon Program
- Super Bomberman R Online
- eBaseball Professional Baseball Spirits 2021: Grand Slam
- Yu-Gi-Oh! Rush Duel: Saikyou Battle Royale!!
- Power Pro-Kun Pocket R
- Tokimeki Memorial Girl’s Side 4th Heart

2022
- Getsu Fūma Den: Undying Moon
- CYGNI: All Guns Blazing
- Yu-Gi-Oh! Master Duel
- eBaseball Powerful Pro Yakyū 2022
- Teenage Mutant Ninja Turtles: The Cowabunga Collection
- Yu-Gi-Oh! Rush Duel: Dawn of the Battle Royale!! Let’s Go! Go Rush!!

2023
- WBSC eBASEBALL: Power Pros
- Super Bomberman R 2
- Momotaro Dentetsu World: Chikyuu wa Kibou de Mawatteru!
- Metal Gear Solid: Master Collection
- Super Crazy Rhythm Castle

2024
- Contra: Operation Galuga
- Tokimeki Memorial Girl’s Side 1st Love
- Tokimeki Memorial Girl’s Side 2nd Season
- Tokimeki Memorial Girl’s Side 3rd Story
- Felix the Cat Collection
- Rocket Knight Adventures: Re-Sparked!
- Powerful Pro Baseball Eikan Nine Crossroad
- Castlevania Dominus Collection
- Powerful Pro Baseball 2024-2025

2025
- Ninja Five-O
- Yu-Gi-Oh! Early Days Collection
- Suikoden I & II HD Remaster Gate Rune and Dunan Unification Wars
- Tokimeki Memorial: forever with you Emotional
- Gradius Origins
- Momtaro Dentetsu 2: Anata no Machi mo Kitto Aru – Higashi Nihon Hen + Nishi Nihon Hen
2026
- Super Bomberman Collection
- Metal Gear Solid Master Collection Vol. 2
- Powerful Pro Baseball 2026-2027
- Ganbare Goemon! Daishūgō
- The Prince of Tennis Sweet School Festival ♡-40 and more...
- The Prince of Tennis: Doki Doki Survival eternal passion

TBD
- Yu-Gi-Oh! GX: Tag Force

Cancelled
- Hyper Sports R
- Darwin's Paradox!

=== Nintendo eShop ===
- Road Fighter
- Time Pilot
- Pooyan
- VS. Gradius
- VS. Castlevania
- Hyper Sports
- TwinBee
- Frogger
- Detana!! TwinBee
- Salamander
- Sunset Riders
- Gradius II
- Circus Charlie
- Vendetta
- Xexex
- Punk Shot

== Nintendo Switch 2 ==
2025
- Survival Kids
- Shine Post: Be Your Idol!
- Suikoden I & II HD Remaster: Gate Rune and Dunan Unification Wars
- Momotaro Dentetsu 2: Ana no Machi mo Kittu Aru – Higashi Nihon Hen + Nishi Nihon Hen
2026
- Super Bomberman Collection
- Metal Gear Solid Master Collection Vol. 2
- Darwin's Paradox!
- The Prince of Tennis Sweet School Festival ♡-40 and more...
- The Prince of Tennis: Doki Doki Survival eternal passion

TBA
- Yu-Gi-Oh! GX: Tag Force

== Nintendo 3DS ==
2011
- 3D Classics: TwinBee (enhanced port of the Famicom version, developed by Arika, published by Nintendo)
- Doctor Lautrec and the Forgotten Knights
- Frogger 3D
- Penguin no Mondai: The Wars
- Pro Evolution Soccer 2011 3D
- Pro Yakyū Spirits 2011
2012
- Pro Evolution Soccer 2012 3D
- Beyond the Labyrinth
- New Love Plus
- Metal Gear Solid: Snake Eater 3D
- Tongari Boushi to Mahou no Machi
- Pro Evolution Soccer 2013 3D
2013
- Castlevania: Lords of Shadow - Mirror of Fate
- Pro Evolution Soccer 2014
- Yu-Gi-Oh! Zexal: Clash! Duel Carnival! (Japan) / Yu-Gi-Oh! Zexal: World Duel Carnival (North America & Europe)
2016
- Yu-Gi-Oh! Duel Monsters: Ultimate Card Battle
- Jikkyō Powerful Pro Yakyū Heroes
2017
- 100% Pascal Sensei: Kanpeki Paint Bombers
- PriPri Chi-chan!!

=== 3DS Virtual Console ===
- Gradius
- TwinBee Da!
- Esper Dream

== Nintendo DS ==
2004
- The Prince of Tennis 2005: Crystal Drive
2005
- Castlevania: Dawn of Sorrow
- Croket! DS: Tenkuu no Yuusha tachi
- Dragon Booster
- Frogger Helmet Chaos
- Ganbare Goemon: Toukai Douchuu Ooedo Tengurigaeshi no Maki
- Atsumare! Power Pro Kun no DS Koushien
- Lost in Blue
- Power Pocket Koushien
- Power Pro Kun Pocket 8
- Tao's Adventure: Curse of the Demon Seal
- Teenage Mutant Ninja Turtles 3: Mutant Nightmare
- Yu-Gi-Oh! Duel Monsters: Nightmare Troubadour (Japan) / Yu-Gi-Oh! Nightmare Troubadour (North America & Europe)
- Korokke! DS: Tenkuu no Yuushatachi
2006
- Iron Feather
- Castlevania: Portrait of Ruin
- My Frogger Toy Trials
- Otogi-Jushi Akazukin
- Yu-Gi-Oh! Duel Monsters GX Spirit Summoner (Japan) / Yu-Gi-Oh! GX: Spirit Caller (North America & Europe)
- Xiaolin Showdown
- Winx Club: Quest for the Codex
- Kabushiki Baibai Trainer Kabutore
- Kirarin Revolution Naasan to Issho
- MAR Heaven: Karudea no Akuma
- Mahjong Fight Club DS
- MAR Heaven: Marchen Awakens Romance Boukyaku no Kuravia
- Power Pro Kun Pocket 9
2007
- Yu-Gi-Oh! Duel Monsters: WORLD CHAMPIONSHIP 2007 (Japan) / Yu-Gi-Oh! World Championship 2007 (North America & Europe)
- Death Note
- Lunar Knights
- Lost in Blue 2
- Konami Classics Series: Arcade Hits
- Winning Eleven: Pro Evolution Soccer 2007
- Steel Horizon
- Time Ace
- Death, Jr. and the Science Fair of Doom
- Dokodemo Yoga
- GoPets: Vacation Island
- Marvel Trading Card Game
- Nova Usagi no Game de Ryuugaku!? DS
- Otona Ryoku Kentei
- Otona no Onnaryoku Kentei
- Tokimeki Memorial Girl's Side 1st Love
- Contra 4
- Power Pro Kun Pocket 10
2008
- New International Track & Field
- Quiz Magic Academy DS
- Zettai Karen Children: Dai 4 no Children
- Time Hollow
- Yu-Gi-Oh! Duel Monsters: WORLD CHAMPIONSHIP 2008 (Japan) / Yu-Gi-Oh! World Championship 2007 (North America & Europe)
- Castlevania: Order of Ecclesia
- Tongari Boushi to Mahou no 365 Nichi
- Power Pro Kun Pocket 11
- Winx Club: Mission Enchantix
2009
- Elebits: The Adventures of Kai and Zero
- Lost in Blue 3
- Suikoden Tierkreis
- Yu-Gi-Oh! 5D's Stardust Accelerator: WORLD CHAMPIONSHIP 2009
- WireWay
- Prince of Tennis: Doubles no Oujisama – Girls, be gracious!
- Prince of Tennis: Doubles no Oujisama – Boys, be glorious!
- Power Pro Kun Pocket 12
- Love Plus
2010
- Quiz Magic Academy DS Futatsu no Jikūseki
- Utacchi
- Yu-Gi-Oh! 5D's WORLD CHAMPIONSHIP 2010: Reverse of Arcadia
- Tongari Boushi to Mahou no Omise
- Captain Tsubasa: Gekito no Kiseki
- Keshisasu-Kun: Battle Kas-tival
- Power Pro Kun Pocket 13
- Gormiti: The Lords Of Nature!
2011
- Flash Puzzle: Maxwell's Mysterious Note
- Power Pro Kun Pocket 14
- Powerful Golf
- Tongari Boushi to Oshare na Mahou Tsukai
- Yu-Gi-Oh! 5D's WORLD CHAMPIONSHIP 2011: Over the Nexus
- Super Scribblenauts

== PlayStation handhelds ==
Title	Release date (NA)	Developer	Platform
Mahjong Fight Club	December 12, 2004	Konami	PlayStation Portable
Metal Gear Acid	March 22, 2005	Konami Computer Entertainment Japan	PlayStation Portable
Rengoku: The Tower of Purgatory	April 26, 2005	Neverland	PlayStation Portable
Coded Arms	July 6, 2005	Konami	PlayStation Portable
Death Jr.	August 16, 2005	Backbone Entertainment	PlayStation Portable
Frogger Helmet Chaos	September 29, 2005	Konami Computer Entertainment Hawaii	PlayStation Portable
Pro Evolution Soccer 5	February 7, 2006	Konami	PlayStation Portable
Winning Eleven 9	February 7, 2006	Konami	PlayStation Portable
Tokimeki Memorial: Forever With You	March 9, 2006	Konami	PlayStation Portable
Metal Gear Acid 2	March 21, 2006	Kojima Productions	PlayStation Portable
Twelve			PlayStation Portable
Gradius Collection	June 6, 2006	Konami	PlayStation Portable
Rengoku II: The Stairway to H.E.A.V.E.N.	September 12, 2006	Neverland	PlayStation Portable
Death Jr. II: Root of Evil	October 31, 2006	Backbone Entertainment	PlayStation Portable
Yu-Gi-Oh! Duel Monsters GX: Tag Force	November 14, 2006	Konami	PlayStation Portable
Metal Gear Solid: Portable Ops	December 5, 2006	Kojima Productions	PlayStation Portable
Jikkyō Powerful Pro Yakyū Portable	2006		PlayStation Portable
Parodius Portable	January 25, 2007	Konami	PlayStation Portable
Salamander Portable	January 25, 2007	Konami	PlayStation Portable
TwinBee Portable	January 25, 2007	Konami	PlayStation Portable
Pro Evolution Soccer 6	February 6, 2007	Konami	PlayStation Portable
Brooktown High	May 22, 2007	Backbone Entertainment	PlayStation Portable
Castlevania: The Dracula X Chronicles	October 23, 2007	Konami	PlayStation Portable
Coded Arms: Contagion	September 18, 2007	Creat Studios	PlayStation Portable
Silent Hill: Origins	November 6, 2007	Climax Studios	PlayStation Portable
Winning Eleven: Pro Evolution Soccer 2007	2007		PlayStation Portable
Jikkyō Powerful Pro Yakyū Portable 2	2007		PlayStation Portable
Yu-Gi-Oh! Duel Monsters GX: Tag Force 2	September 18, 2007	Konami	PlayStation Portable
Flatout Head On	2008		PlayStation Portable
Pro Evolution Soccer 2008	2008		PlayStation Portable
Pro Evolution Soccer 2009	2008		PlayStation Portable
Yu-Gi-Oh! Duel Monsters GX: Tag Force 3	2008		PlayStation Portable
Jikkyō Powerful Pro Yakyū Portable 3	2008		PlayStation Portable
Pro Evolution Soccer 2010	November 10, 2009	Konami Computer Entertainment Tokyo	PlayStation Portable
Ōkami Kakushi	2009	Konami	PlayStation Portable
Yu-Gi-Oh! 5D's: Tag Force 4	November 18, 2009	Konami	PlayStation Portable
Shadow of Memories/Shadow of Destiny	January 26, 2010	Konami Computer Entertainment Tokyo	PlayStation Portable
Jikkyō Powerful Pro Yakyū Portable 4	2009		PlayStation Portable
Metal Gear Solid: Peace Walker	June 8, 2010	Kojima Productions	PlayStation Portable
Busou Shinki Battle Masters	July 15, 2010	Pyramid	PlayStation Portable
Pop'n Music Portable	February 4, 2010	Konami	PlayStation Portable
Silent Hill: Shattered Memories	January 19, 2010	Climax Studios	PlayStation Portable
Power Pro Success Legends	2010		PlayStation Portable
Tegami Bachi: Kokoro Tsumugu Mono e	2010		PlayStation Portable
Pro Yakyū Spirits 2010	April 1, 2010		PlayStation Portable
Puzzle Chronicles	2010		PlayStation Portable
Yu-Gi-Oh! 5D's: Tag Force 5	September 16, 2010	Konami	PlayStation Portable
Pro Evolution Soccer 2011	October 29, 2010	Konami	PlayStation Portable
Busou Shinki Battle Masters Mk.2	September 22, 2011	Pyramid	PlayStation Portable
Yu-Gi-Oh! 5D's: Tag Force 6	September 22, 2011	Konami	PlayStation Portable
Pop'n Music Portable 2	November 23, 2011	Konami	PlayStation Portable
Pro Evolution Soccer 2012	November 8, 2011	Konami	PlayStation Portable
Pro Yakyū Spirits 2011	March 29, 2012	Konami	PlayStation Portable
Little King's Story	March 29, 2012	Konami	PlayStation Vita
Metal Gear Solid HD Collection	June 12, 2012	Armature Studio	PlayStation Vita
Silent Hill: Book of Memories	October 16, 2012	WayForward Technologies	PlayStation Vita
Pro Evolution Soccer 2013	October 26, 2012	Konami	PlayStation Portable
Pro Yakyū Spirits 2012	March 29, 2012	Konami	PlayStation Portable / PlayStation Vita
Pro Evolution Soccer 2014	September 20, 2013	Konami	PlayStation Portable
Pro Yakyū Spirits 2013	March 20, 2013	Konami	PlayStation Portable / PlayStation Vita
Pro Yakyū Spirits 2014	March 20, 2014	Konami	PlayStation Portable / PlayStation Vita
Yu-Gi-Oh! Arc-V Tag Force Special	January 22, 2015	Konami	PlayStation Portable
Pro Yakyū Spirits 2015	March 26, 2015	Konami	PlayStation Vita
Jikkyō Powerful Pro Yakyū 2016	April 4, 2016	Konami	PlayStation Vita
Jikkyō Powerful Pro Yakyū Championship 2017	May 25, 2017	Konami	PlayStation Vita
Pro Yakyū Spirits 2019	July 18, 2019	Konami	PlayStation Vita

== Mobile phones ==
200?
- Antarctic Adventure (2001?)
- Pooyan (2001?)
- Shiori Jan
2000
- The Pirate Mileage
- Konami Characore World (コナミキャラコレワールド, Konamikyarakorewārudo)
2001
- Bishi Bashi Champ
- Twinbee
- Puzzle-Dama
2002
- Ganbare Goemon: Tsūkai Game Apli
- Kekkyo ku Nankyoku choi bōken (けっきょく南極ちょい冒険)
- Tank Battle X
- Riddle Rally
- Pastel Jan
- Royal Casino (ロイヤルカジノ)
- Konami No Burokkukuzushi Nazo No Kabe
- Mokemoke Dōchūki (もけもけ道中記)
- Mokemoke Quest (もけもけクエスト)
2003
- Parodius Da! －Shinwa kara Owarai e－
- Knightmare
- Mini kyodai Robo Goemon Compact (ミニ巨大ロボ ゴエモンコンパクト)
- Quarth
- Gradius
- Contra
- Time Pilot
- Salamander
- Puzzle-Dama DX
- DX Hanafuda
- Star Devastator
2004
- Tokimeki Memorial
- Detana! Twinbee
- TwinBee Dungeon
- Gradius NEO
- Gradius NEO -IMPERIAL-
- Tokimeki Memorial Girl's Side Puzzle-Dama
- Metal Gear
- Solid Snake
- Castlevania
- Silent Scope
- Track and Field
- Penta no Tsuri Bōken DX
- Gyruss
- Kawaī Jan
- Bakudan Ribāshi
- Bakudan Shinkei Suijaku
- Bakudan Go Mo Kunara Be
- Motto Mokemoke Dōchūki (もっともけもけ道中記)
2005
- Ganbare Goemon 3: Shichijuurokubei no Karakuri Manji Gatame
- Ganbare Goemon! Karakuri Dōchū
- Dance Dance Revolution Mobile 3D
- Quiz Konamillion
- Gradius II
- Road Fighter
- Dancing Stage
- Quiz Magic Academy Mobile
2006
- Frogger for Prizes
- Konami Wai Wai World
- Akumajō Special: Boku Dracula-kun
- Bio Miracle Bokutte Upa
- Gradius 2
- Konami Wai Wai Sokoban
- Space Manbow
- Parodius
- Rumble Roses Sexy Pinball
- New Track and Field
- Penguin Adventure
- Frogger 25th, Frogger Evolution
- Castlevania III: Dracula's Curse
- Dance Dance Revolution
- Rush'n Attack
- Ai Senshi Nicol
2007
- Ganbare Goemon Gaiden: Kieta Ougon Kiseru
- Gokujō Parodius! ～Kako no Eikō o Motomete～
- Frogger Launch
- Pirate Poppers
- Shout! Shaberin Champ Mobile
- Quiz Magic Academy Mobile 2
- Silent Hill: Orphan
- Castlevania: Order of Shadows
- Tokimeki Memorial OnlyLove ~ Tokimeki no Partner ~
- Intuition! Bishi Bashi Champ Mobile
- Tokimeki Memorial 2
- Contra 4
- Airforce Delta Alternative
- Hell Girl Puzzle-Dama
- Professor Fizzwizzle
- Esper Dream
2008
- Pro Evolution Soccer 2008
- Suikoden
- Konami Comic: Genso Suikoden
- Metal Gear Acid Mobile
- Metal Gear Solid Mobile
- Tokimeki Memorial Girl's Side -Love Stories-
- Tomenasanna The pure Showa volume
- Frogger Beats n' Bounces
- Silent Hill Orphan 2
- Dewy's Adventure
- Quiz Magic Academy Mobile 3
- Tokimeki Memorial Mail Drama
- Konami Comic: Genso Suikoden II
- Castlevania: Aria of Sorrow
- Yie Ar Kung-Fu
- Suikoden Tierkreis Stardust Castle
- Super Contra
- Pro Evolution Soccer 2009
- LOST in BLUE Mobile Marina ＆ Riku Volume
- GTI Club: Supermini Festa!
- Power Pro World Home Run Competition 4
2009
- Suikoden II
- Pro Evolution Soccer 2010
- Metal Gear Acid 2 Mobile
- Tomenasanna PJ Emperor Strikes Back
- Tomenasanna UrbanCrisis
- The Bishi Bashi! e-AMUSEMENT
- Tokimeki Memorial Girl's Side 2nd Season Short Stories
- Hayate no Gotoku!! Puzzle-Dama
- iW Toki Memo
- Logic Puzzle DX
- Power Pro World University Baseball Success Volume
- Power Pro World High School Baseball Success Volume
- Power Pro World Shakaijin Yakyū Success Volume
- Konami Comic: Genso Suikoden Tierkreis
- Tokimeki Memorial Girl's Side 2nd Season: Novell Communications
- Jackal
- Power Pro World Mobile – Powerful Pro Baseball MEGA-X
- Power Pro World Mobile Powerful Pro Baseball 6
- Gorufure!
- DX toranpu 6in
- Kuizu Gakumon Nosusume
- Puchitto Meitantei
2010
- Road Fighters
- Gradius Arc -Legend of Silver Wing-
- Tokimeki Memorial 4 Chu!
- Millionaire Handy
- Suikoden Card Collection
- Tokimeki Memorial Girl's Side Mobile
- Tokimeki Memorial 4: Communication Comic
- DanceDanceRevolution X2
- Silent Hill Mobile 3
- Otegaru FreeCell
- Power Pro World Fierce Fighting High School Baseball Success Volume
- Quiz Magic Academy Mobile 4
2011
- Pop'n music M
- Social Appli Surotore! KPE for GREE
- Social Appli Power Pro home run competition for GREE
- Magic Academy Puzzle-Dama
2013
- Pro Evolution Soccer Club Manager
2018
- Pro Evolution Soccer 2019
2019
- Pro Evolution Soccer 2020

== I-revo ==
- 200?

- Cosmic Wars
- Getsu Fūma Den
2006
- Stinger
- TwinBee 3

== Plug and Play ==
- Konami Live! Controller – Arcade
- Konami Live! Controller – Frogger
2001
- Dance Dance Revolution Family Mat (Japan)
- My First Dance Dance Revolution (Japan)
2006
- Dance Dance Revolution Strawberry Shortcake (North America)
- Dance Dance Revolution Disney Mix (North America)
- My First Dance Dance Revolution (North America)

== Handheld electronic games ==
19??
- Beatmania
- Guitar Freaks
- Star Trek
- Top Gun: Second Mission
- Track & Field: Throwing type (by Bandai)
- Tutankham
1982
- Guttang Gottong (by Mattel)
1984
- Track & Field: Running type (by Bandai)
1988
- The Lone Ranger
1989
- The Adventures of Bayou Billy
- Contra
- Double Dribble
- Gradius
- Teenage Mutant Ninja Turtles
- Bill Elliot's NASCAR Racing
- Blades of Steel
- Bottom of the Ninth
- Bull's Eye Barbecue Sauce
- NFL Football
- Skate or Die
- Top Gun
1990
- Teenage Mutant Ninja Turtles II Splinter Speaks
- Ganbare Goemon: Ebisumaru Kiki Ippatsu
- Antarctic Adventure (usually listed as South Pole)
1991
- Bucky O'Hare
- Garfield
- Teenage Mutant Ninja Turtles 3 Shredder's Last Stand
- Teenage Mutant Ninja Turtles Basketball
1992
- Asterix
- Major League Baseball
- Star Trek 25th Anniversary
- Teenage Mutant Ninja Turtles Four for Four
- Top Gun: Airstrike 3
1998
- Castlevania Symphony of the Night (by Tiger)
- Dungeon Quest

== Merchandise games ==
1990
- Kokekko!!
- Ouyata
1998
- Jikkyō Powerful Stadium
2001
- Hie Hie Penta: Ice Cream Catcher
2019
- Gokkan Hie Hie Penta
2024
- Konapura

== Redemption/medal games ==
1974
- Lucky Continental
1975
- Ascot Race
1976
- Daytona 200 (by Leijac)
- F-1 Grand Prix (by Leijac)
- Trumph II (by Leijac)
- Jump Ski (by Leijac)
- Piccadilly Circus (by Leijac)
- Piccadilly Circus Mark II (by Leijac)
- Pierrot (by Leijac)
- Robot-6 (by Leijac)
1977
- Great Race (by Leijac)
- Picadilly Gutman (by Leijac)
- Picadilly New (by Leijac)
- Picadilly Single (by Leijac)
- Piccalot (by Leijac)
- Piccarally (by Leijac)
- Red Line (by Leijac)
- Skydriver (by Leijac)
- Super Gold Scope
1978
- Le Mans 24th (by Leijac)
- Piccadilly Single Special (by Leijac)
- Picca Race (by Leijac)
- Super Weapons (by Leijac)
1979
- Picacdilly Fever (by Leijac)
1980
- Fever Nine (by Leijac)
- Kunitori Battle (by Leijac)
- Piccadilly Card (by Leijac)
- Piccadilly Jack (by Leijac)
- Piccadilly Queen (by Leijac)
- Janken Game (by Leijac)
- World War
1981
- World Journey (by Leijac)
- Kenbuman
1982
- Mobile Suit Gundam
- Piccadilly Circus Lion
- Piccadilly Circus Racer
1983
- Takarajima
- Frogger
- Pooyan
- Super Goritan
1984
- Hyōkin Penta (by Takara Goraku)
1987
- Piccadilly Gradius
- Piccadilly RF2
1988
- Tsurikko Pengin
1990
- Piccadilly Circus: Fantasy World
- Piccadilly Circus: Mobile World
- Piccadilly Circus: Space World
- Whoo Yarth Taar
1991
- Piccadilly Circus: Super Mario Bros. 3
- Piccadilly Circus: Super Mario World
- Last Queen
- Little Pro (by Bromley)
- Mario Roulette
- Slime Kun
- Tsurikko Penta
1992
- Birdie Putt
- Dream Circuit
1993
- Animal Grand Prix
- F1 World Racing
- Tourmate
1994
- Bingo Magic
- Tako no Hattsuan
- Funky Monkey
- Piccadilly Circus: Konami Wai Wai World
- Pleasure Castle
1995
- Penny Garden
- Super Tsurikko Penta
- Trio De Bingo
- Cross Magic
- GI-Classic
- Hyper Keirin
- Million Fever
- Mumbling Pharaoh
- Pleasure Castle II
- Powerful Boxing
1996
- Cross Magic Mark 2
- Fruits Magic
- Fūsen Penta
- GI-Classic Winds
- Mighty Bird
- Powerful Striker
- Syodouken
- Wonder Cosmos
1997
- Aqua Twister
- Dragon Palace
- Miracle Spin
- Smash & Spin
1998
- Aqua Twister 2
- Bingo Stage
- Bomber Rush
- Boo Boo Bank
- Bumping Pucks
- Delta Magic
- Diamond Circle
- Flip Flop
- GI-Classic EX
- Jikkyou Powerful Stadium
- Muscle Ranking Struck Out!
- Pile Magic
- Trick Star
- Twinkle Dome
1999
- Bomber Chance
- GI-Leading Sire
- Hover Shooter
- Jolly Partner
- Kick Target II
- Magic Theater Gundivide
- Smash & Spin 2
- Muscle Ranking UFO
- Wanagetto
2000
- Bingo Boomer
- Bomber Chance 2
- Cyclone Fever
- Dragon Palace Dragon Dragon March
- Football Masters
- GI-Leading Sire Ver 2
- Gun Mania
- Magic Theater Lovely Bubbly
- Piccadilly Circus 2000
- Pocket Pirates
- Silent Scope Token Shot
2026
- Fortune Trinity: Jurassic Treasure
- Teenage Mutant Ninja Turtles
- Anima Lotta: Anima to Shiawase no Okurimono
- Momotaro Dentetsu 2: Anata no Machi no Medal Game
TBA
- Blazing Encounter Bleach
- Blazing Encounter Black Clover
- Ghostbusters

== Others ==
- Funky Monkey
- Little Pirates
- Gokuraku Parodius
