= Whiteout (video game) =

2002 video game

- Developer: Vicarious Visions
- Publisher: Konami
- Platforms: PlayStation 2, Microsoft Windows, Xbox
- Release: PlayStation 2: NA: November 26, 2002; EU: October 10, 2003; Windows, Xbox: NA: December 10, 2002
- Genre: Racing
- Modes: Single-player, multiplayer

Whiteout is a snowmobile racing video game published by Konami for PlayStation 2, Microsoft Windows, and Xbox in 2002.

== Development ==
The game originally started development as an ESPN tie-in video game under its then-licensing agreement, as ESPN Winter X Games Snocross, but following the loss of the ESPN license, the game was retooled as Whiteout.

== Reception ==
Reception

Aggregate score
Aggregator	Score	
Aggregator	PS2	Xbox
Metacritic	50/100	58/100

Review scores
Publication	Score	
Publication	PS2	Xbox
Game Informer	N/A	6.25/10
GameRevolution	D	N/A
GameSpot	4.3/10	N/A
GameSpy	2.5/5	N/A
IGN	5.5/10	N/A
Jeuxvideo.com	10/20	N/A
Official U.S. PlayStation Magazine	1/5	N/A
Official Xbox Magazine (US)	N/A	5.7/10
PlayStation: The Official Magazine	7/10	N/A
X-Play	2/5	N/A

The PlayStation 2 and Xbox versions received "mixed" reviews according to the review aggregation website Metacritic.
