= Coffeetime Crosswords =

2008 video game

- Developers: Voltex, Inc.
- Publisher: Konami
- Platform: Xbox 360
- Release: NA: July 16, 2008
- Genre: Puzzle
- Modes: Single-player, Multiplayer

Coffeetime Crosswords is a crossword puzzle game developed by Japanese studio Voltex, Inc. for Xbox Live Arcade on the Xbox 360 released on July 16, 2008.

== Reception ==
Reception

Aggregate score
Aggregator	Score
Metacritic	39/100

Review scores
Publication	Score
Eurogamer	3/10
GamePro	2.5/5
IGN	3.5/10

Coffeetime Crosswords received negative reviews from critics upon release. On Metacritic, the game holds a score of 39/100 based on 8 reviews, indicating "generally unfavorable reviews".
