= ESPN NFL PrimeTime 2002 =

2001 video game

- Developer: Farsight Technologies
- Publisher: Konami of America
- Producer: Bobby King
- Designer: Bobby King
- Programmers: Sean Shannon; Rob Wolpov; Eubank Wang; Jeff Rice
- Artists: Ken Race; Craig Alexander; Jesus Baeza
- Platforms: PlayStation 2, Xbox, Windows
- Release: PlayStation 2: NA: October 30, 2001; Xbox: NA: January 22, 2002; Windows: NA: March 8, 2002
- Genre: Sports video game
- Modes: Single-player, multiplayer

ESPN NFL PrimeTime 2002 is a sports video game developed by Farsight Technologies and published by Konami for PlayStation 2 in 2001, and for Xbox and Windows in 2002.

== Reception ==
Reception

Aggregate scores
Aggregator	Score		
Aggregator	PC	PS2	Xbox
GameRankings	55%	64%	58%
Metacritic	N/A	65/100	57/100

Review scores
Publication	Score		
Publication	PC	PS2	Xbox
AllGame	N/A	N/A	2.5/5
Game Informer	N/A	6/10	6/10
GamePro	N/A	3.5/5	N/A
GameSpot	3.6/10	5.5/10	4.7/10
GameZone	6/10	N/A	8.3/10
IGN	N/A	5.8/10	4/10
Official Xbox Magazine (US)	N/A	N/A	7.1/10

The PlayStation 2 and Xbox versions received "mixed" reviews according to the review aggregation website Metacritic.
