= Project Overkill =

1996 video game

- Developer: Konami Chicago
- Publisher: Konami
- Platform: PlayStation
- Release: NA: September 12, 1996; EU: November 1996
- Genre: Shoot 'em up
- Mode: Single-player

Project Overkill is 1996 a shoot 'em up video game developed and published by Konami for the PlayStation. The plot of the game revolves around a group of four mercenaries hired to eliminate a group of humans called the Viscerians.

== Gameplay ==
The gameplay takes on a 3D-esque isometric view, in which the player can choose one of four mercenaries to lead through the levels. The characters act as lives, and if one were killed, the player still has the choice among the remaining mercenaries (rather than having multiple lives for one character). In the levels, the player must find key-cards, destroy guards, aliens, and robots, activate laser bridges, to complete an objective. Objectives include finding the exit to the level, assassination of an officer, escorting a defect or other important official, retrieving an item (usually a memory chip or the like), or obtaining a certain percentage of kills in the area.

The four characters have very different abilities. For example, the large alien, Quogg, has a melee attack that will kill the standard human troops in just one hit (rather than the two required from the other characters). Also, each character has slight variations in weaponry that make for somewhat different combat experiences.

== Development ==
During development the game's producer and designer, who spoke on condition of anonymity, commented, "We chose the isometric perspective because it meant you could see more of the playing area and also you could see an arrow go through the chest and you can see the result from behind too."

The soundtrack was written by Mark Yoshimoto Nemcoff.

Work on a port for the Sega Saturn began while the PlayStation version was still in development. However, it was never released.

== Reception ==
Reception

Review scores
Publication	Score
AllGame	4/5
Electronic Gaming Monthly	7/10
Game Informer	8/10
GameFan	86/100 (Note: In GameFan's review, three critics scored Project Overkill differently: 89, 86, and 83.)
GameSpot	4.6/10
Hyper	78%
IGN	5/10
Mean Machines Sega	90/100
Next Generation	4/5
VideoGames & Computer Entertainment	8/10

Reviewers widely condemned the game's control system, in that the player aims their weapon using the four action buttons, saying it makes lining up shots frustratingly difficult and often leads to running out of ammunition. However, overall assessments of the game varied widely. GameSpot's Jeff Kitts and an IGN reviewer both panned the game as a Loaded clone which lacks the enticing music, impressive graphical effects, and excitement which made that game popular, retaining only the mindless ultra-violent gameplay which had since been done to death. A Next Generation reviewer and Dan Hsu of Electronic Gaming Monthly both acknowledged that Project Overkill is just the latest in a growing pile of mindless ultra-violent shooters, but contended that it is one of the better games of its breed and is enjoyable when taken for what it is. In contrast, Hsu's co-reviewers Shawn Smith and Sushi-X asserted that unlike other violent shooters, Project Overkill is deep and challenging. GamePro took a middle ground position, calling it "flawed but engaging".
