= Punk Shot =

1990 video game

- North American arcade flyer
- Developer: Konami
- Publisher: Konami
- Platform: Arcade
- Release: NA: November 1990; JP: December 1990
- Genre: Sports
- Modes: Single-player, multiplayer

Punk Shot (Note: Japanese: パンクショット, Hepburn: Panku Shotto) is a 1990 basketball video game developed and published by Konami for arcades. It was released in North America in November 1990 and in Japan in December 1990. Hamster Corporation released the game as part of their Arcade Archives series for the Nintendo Switch and PlayStation 4 in May 2025.

== Gameplay ==
Punk Shot features two groups of street punks, the Ramblers and the Slammers, who play streetball. Up to four players can play the game; the player can assault and tackle opposing players to prevent them from holding onto the ball, while aiming to score by throwing the ball into the net with teammates. Hazards appear frequently, such as manholes, bombs and cats which hurl obstacles at the punks' direction. Usual basketball rules do not apply other than that the players score properly.
