= Millennium Winter Sports =

2000 video game

- Developer: Konami
- Publisher: Konami
- Platform: Game Boy Color
- Release: JP: January 27, 2000; EU: 2000; NA: April 2000
- Genre: Snowboarding
- Mode: Single-player

Millennium Winter Sports, known in Japan as Hyper Olympic Winter 2000 (ハイパーオリンピック ウィンター2000, Haipā Orinpikku Wintā 2000), and in Europe as Konami Winter Games, is a video game developed and published by Konami for Game Boy Color in 2000.

== Reception ==
Reception

Review scores
| Publication | Score |
|---|---|
| Consoles + | 86% |
| Computer and Video Games | 4/5 |
| Famitsu | 21/40 |
| Game Informer | 7.25/10 |
| IGN | 7/10 |
| Nintendo Power | 6.1/10 |

The game received average reviews. In Japan, Famitsu gave it a score of 21 out of 40. Game Informer and Nintendo Power gave the game average to mixed reviews while it was still in development months before its Japan and U.S. release dates.
