= Ai Senshi Nicol =

1987 video game

- Developer(s): Konami
- Publisher(s): Konami
- Platform(s): Family Computer Disk System; Mobile phone
- Release: JP: April 24, 1987
- Genre(s): Action-adventure
- Mode(s): Single-player

Ai Senshi Nicol (愛戦士ニコル, Ai Senshi Nikoru, lit. "Love Warrior Nicol") is a 1987 action-adventure game by Konami for the Family Computer Disk System. It was only released in Japan.

== Plot ==
Nicol, a 14-year-old genius inventor and his girlfriend Stella manage to invent a dimensional space transporting device, but their research attracts the attention of Gyumao (Cow Demon), a ruthless dictator of a military empire with plans for space conquest. The Demon offers to buy the device from the couple and act out his nefarious plans. Wanting to preserve the peace of his world, Nicol turns down the offer, denying Gyumao the means to accomplish his goal. The Demon, furious, dispatches his soldiers to kidnap Stella and steal the device from Nicol's laboratory. The soldiers ambush Nicol and Stella during a date, overpowering Nicol and carrying off his girlfriend.

Defeated, Nicol returns to his laboratory only to find the device gone. Fortunately, the transporter was not yet complete, lacking a vital part which was still in Nicol's possession. Gyumao hopes to exchange Stella with the indispensable part he needs, but Nicol has other plans in mind. Against Gyumao's orders, he travels to Gyumao's Dairasu star system to free his lover himself. A disapproving Gyumao shatters the device into pieces and scatters those fragments across seven locations. Nicol must then travel across Dairasu, collect the fragments, repair the transporter, and liberate his girlfriend.

== Development ==
Despite the game's development being in Japan, English is used throughout the game.

== Bibliography ==
- Kalata, Kurt (2017). Hardcore Gaming 101 Presents: Contra and Other Konami Classics. ISBN 978-1546928034.
