= Super Crazy Rhythm Castle =

2023 video game

- Developer: Second Impact Games
- Publisher: Konami Digital Entertainment
- Engine: Unity
- Platforms: Nintendo Switch; PlayStation 4; PlayStation 5; Windows; Xbox One; Xbox Series X/S
- Release: WW: November 14, 2023
- Genre: Rhythm
- Modes: Single-player, multiplayer

Super Crazy Rhythm Castle is a 2023 rhythm video game developed by Second Impact Games and published by Konami Digital Entertainment. One to four players compete to win a contest that tests their rhythm and sometimes involve puzzles.

== Gameplay ==
Up to four players compete to win a contest and become the king of Rhythm Castle. Each challenge uses rhythm game mechanics and sometimes incorporates elements of puzzle games. Players must press three buttons in time with the beats from the songs.

== Development ==
Konami Digital Entertainment released Super Crazy Rhythm Castle on November 14, 2023.

== Reception ==
On Metacritic, Super Crazy Rhythm Castle received mixed reviews for the Switch and positive reviews for PlayStation 5. Nintendo World Report praised the surreal graphics, humor, and gameplay. However, they felt the songs were sometimes generic, and they disliked the Switch controls, which can not be remapped. They concluded that it is "flawed but interesting". Vandal and IGN France praised the soundtrack and co-op gameplay, though they said it can be frustrating when played single-player. Vandal also enjoyed the gameplay and level design. Eurogamer Germany also enjoyed the soundtrack, but they had issues with getting controllers to work properly on Windows. They also like the rhythm-based gameplay, but they felt there was too much unskippable dialogue that was poorly presented. Multiplayer.it enjoyed the mix of genres, but they did not like the soundtrack or the story.
