= K-1 World Grand Prix (video game) =

2002 video game

- Developer: Konami
- Publisher: Konami
- Series: K-1 Fighting
- Platform: PlayStation 2
- Release: JP: November 28, 2002; NA: July 9, 2003
- Genres: Sports, fighting
- Modes: Single-player, multiplayer

K-1 World Grand Prix, known in Japan as K-1 World Grand Prix 2002 (K-1 ワールドグランプリ 2002, K-1 Wārudo Guran Puri 2002), is a video game based on the K-1 martial arts organization in Hong Kong and the K-1 World Grand Prix, developed and published by Konami for PlayStation 2 in 2002-2003. It is the thirteenth game in the K-1 Fighting series.

== Reception ==
Reception

Aggregate score
Aggregator	Score
Metacritic	67/100

Review scores
Publication	Score
Electronic Gaming Monthly	6.17/10
Famitsu	30/40
Game Informer	6.5/10
GamePro	4/5
GameRevolution	D
GameSpot	6.6/10
GameSpy	2/5
GameZone	7.8/10
IGN	8.3/10
Official U.S. PlayStation Magazine	2/5

The game received "average" reviews according to the review aggregation website Metacritic. In Japan, Famitsu gave it a score of 30 out of 40.
