= Escape Kids =

1991 video game

- Arcade flyer
- Developer: Konami
- Publisher: Konami
- Platform: Arcade
- Release: JP: January 1991
- Genre: Racing
- Modes: Single-player, multiplayer

Escape Kids (Note: Japanese: エスケープキッズ, Hepburn: Esukēpu Kizzu) is a 1991 racing video game developed and published by Konami for arcades. It was released only in Japan in January 1991. Hamster Corporation released the game outside Japan for the first time as part of their Arcade Archives series for the Nintendo Switch and PlayStation 4 in January 2025.

== Gameplay ==
Player control up to four characters who partake in races in obstacle courses. Players aim to be the first to complete three laps around a course by running and using a limited amount of super jumps while collecting coins and avoiding obstacles that slow them down. Power-ups that allow the player to speed up appear occasionally. The coins can be used to enhance the player's abilities after each race.
