= Fisherman's Challenge =

2003 video game

- Developer(s): Konami
- Publisher(s): Konami
- Platform(s): PlayStation 2
- Release: NA: January 22, 2003; EU: March 28, 2003
- Genre(s): Sports (fishing)
- Mode(s): Single-player, multiplayer

Fisherman's Challenge is a fishing video game developed and published by Konami in 2003. It was originally scheduled for release in November 2002, before it was delayed to January 2003.

== Reception ==
Reception

Aggregate score
| Aggregator | Score |
|---|---|
| Metacritic | 67/100 |

Review scores
| Publication | Score |
|---|---|
| Game Informer | 7.5/10 |
| GameSpot | 7.1/10 |
| GameSpy | 4/5 stars |
| GameZone | 8/10 |
| IGN | 7/10 |
| Jeuxvideo.com | 10/20 |
| Official U.S. PlayStation Magazine | 2/5 stars |
| X-Play | 2/5 stars |

The game received "average" reviews according to the review aggregation website Metacritic.
