= Ash (video game) =

2010 video game

- Developer: SRRN Games
- Publishers: SRRN Games (iOS); Konami (Android); CIRCLE Entertainment (3DS)
- Platforms: iOS, Android, Nintendo 3DS
- Release: iOS; October 21, 2010; Android; February 29, 2012; 3DS: NA: April 28, 2016; EU: October 13, 2016
- Genre: Role-playing
- Mode: Single-player

Ash is a turn-based role-playing video game developed by SRRN Games for iOS in 2010, for Android in 2012, and for Nintendo 3DS' now-defunct eShop in 2016.

== Reception ==
Reception

Aggregate score
Aggregator	Score
Metacritic	(iOS) 75/100 (3DS) 30/100

Review scores
Publication	Score
The A.V. Club	(iOS) A−
Destructoid	(iOS) 6/10
GamePro	(iOS) 3.5/5
IGN	(iOS) 7/10
Macworld	(iOS) 4/5
Nintendo Life	(3DS) 3/10
RPGFan	(iOS) 87%
TouchArcade	(iOS) 4.5/5

The iOS version received "generally favorable reviews", while the 3DS version received "unfavorable" reviews, according to the review aggregation website Metacritic.

== Sequel ==
A sequel to the game, Ash II: Shadows, was published by Konami in 2012.
