= Fisherman's Bait: A Bass Challenge =

1998 video game

- Developer: Konami
- Publisher: Konami
- Platforms: Arcade, PlayStation
- Release: Arcade; 1998; PlayStation: JP: October 8, 1998; NA: February 16, 1999; EU: 1999
- Genre: Sports (fishing)
- Modes: Single-player, multiplayer

Fisherman's Bait: A Bass Challenge, also known as simply Fisherman's Bait and in Japan as Exciting Bass (エキサイティングバス, Ekisaitingu Basu), is a fishing video game developed and published by Konami for the arcades in 1998. It was later ported to the PlayStation in 1999.

== Reception ==
Reception

Aggregate score
Aggregator	Score
GameRankings	62%

Review scores
Publication	Score
AllGame	3.5/5
CNET Gamecenter	7/10
Electronic Gaming Monthly	6.875/10 (Note: In Electronic Gaming Monthly's review of the PlayStation version, one critic gave it 7.5/10, two others gave it each a score of 7/10, and another gave it 6/10.)
EP Daily	7.5/10
Famitsu	26/40
Game Informer	6/10
GameFan	52% (Note: In GameFan's viewpoint of the PlayStation version, one critic gave it 61, and the other 42.)
GameSpot	6.5/10
IGN	3.5/10
Official U.S. PlayStation Magazine	3.5/5

The PlayStation version received mixed reviews according to the review aggregation website GameRankings. In Japan, Famitsu gave it a score of 26 out of 40.
