= Iron Feather =

2006 video game

- Developer: Konami
- Publisher: Konami
- Platform: Nintendo DS
- Release: JP: January 19, 2006
- Genre: Action RPG
- Mode: Single player

Iron Feather (アイアンフェザー, Aian Fezā) is a game for the Nintendo DS developed by Konami. It released on January 16, 2006.

== Reception ==
Iron Feather received an overall score of 29/40 from Famitsu (individual reviews: 7/8/7/7). Famitsu Cube + Advance magazine gave an overall score of 28/40 (individual reviews: 7/7/7/7).
