= International Rally =

1999 video game

- Developer: Konami
- Publisher: Konami
- Platform: Game Boy Color
- Release: 13 May 1999
- Genre: Racing
- Modes: Single-player, Multiplayer

International Rally (released in Europe as Cross Country Racing and Japan as It's a World Rally) is a 1999 racing video game developed by Konami for the Game Boy Color. The game features rally races across 20 tracks set in international countries including France, Italy, Egypt and Japan. Upon release, International Rally received mixed to negative reviews, with critics praising the attempt to integrate racing simulation elements into a handheld game, but faulting its lack of variety, slow gameplay, and lacklustre visuals.

== Gameplay ==
The user interface of International Rally depicts the condition of engine parts, which players are required to maintain.

International Rally is a rally racing game in which players compete in races across 20 tracks. In 'Rally' mode, players complete a race against computer-controlled opponents across three difficulty settings, with higher difficulties featuring more opponents in a race. 'Time Attack' mode, players attempt to complete a track in the fastest time, and supports the use the Game Link Cable for two-player multiplayer races. 'Championship' mode allows players to choose one of four group challenges and complete a series of races. Cars a damage model in which players monitor the status of their tyres, gears, engine and shock absorbers, and can stop and repair them if they are damaged due to collisions throughout the race to maintain speed.

== Reception ==
Reception

Review scores
Publication	Score
Computer and Video Games	3/5
Game - The Game Boy Color Magazine	2/5
Nintendo Official Magazine	70%

International Rally received mixed to negative reviews upon release. Computer & Video Games commended the game as a "credible attempt at squeezing a semblance of realism onto the Game Boy Color", highlighting the game's tuning and maintenance options, but found the game was not fun enough to warrant purchase. David O'Donohoe of Games Domain critiqued the game for its "average gameplay", "dull" graphics and "repetitive" fixed backgrounds, and "grating" sound effects. Game dismissed the game as a failure, citing the "similar" tracks and "boring" gameplay. Nintendo Official Magazine noted the game's challenge, but found the game was inferior to other racers, citing the game's slow pace. Game Boy Xtreme dismissed the game as having "nothing special at all".
