= Mahjong Fight Club =

- Mahjong Fight Club Extreme logo, the latest and 17th release in the series.
- Developer: Konami
- Publishers: Konami, Konami Digital Entertainment
- Platform: Arcade
- Release: Japan: March 2002
- Genre: Mahjong video game
- Arcade system: VIPER (1st to 2); PC base board (3-5) second generation PCB (6 onwards)

Mahjong Fight Club (MAH-JONG FIGHT CLUB, MFC) is an arcade mahjong game operated by Konami. It is also used as the name of Konami Amusement's team (KONAMI Mahjong Fight Club) in the M-League professional mahjong league. There is a sister series, Mahjong Fight Girl, which released in March 2023.

== Overview ==
Since MFC2, the game has been officially recognized by the Japan Professional Mahjong Federation, and professional mahjong players from the federation appear in the game with their real names. In addition, a home video game version has been released, and the game is also available on a mobile website for some models. Along with Sega's “MJ Series”, this title is an example of an arcade mahjong game. Pachislot and pachinko machines based on this title have been released.

== Home console versions ==
Mahjong Fight Club (consumer)
- Developer: Konami
- Publishers: Konami, Konami Digital Entertainment
- Platforms: PlayStation Portable, PlayStation 3, Nintendo DS, Nintendo Wii, PlayStation Vita
- Release: PSP: JP: December 12, 2004; PS3: JP: November 16, 2006; Wii: JP: April 29, 2009; PS Vita: JP: December 17, 2011
- Genre: Mahjong video game
- Modes: Single-player, multiplayer

Mahjong Fight Club has been released on various home consoles, including the Nintendo Wii, PlayStation 3, and Nintendo DS.
