= Tomena Sanner =

2009 video game

- Developer: Konami
- Publisher: Konami
- Platforms: Wii (WiiWare), iOS
- Release: WiiWare: JP: August 4, 2009 (As "Tomena Sanner Wii"); EU: January 1, 2010; NA: February 8, 2010; iOS: JP: March 5, 2010 (As "Tomena Sanner Touch"); NA: March 8, 2010; EU: March 10, 2010
- Genre: Action
- Modes: Single-player, multiplayer (Wii only)

Tomena Sanner (トメナサンナー, Tomena Sannā) is a video game by Konami originally created as a trilogy for Japanese mobile services i-Mode, Yahoo! Keitai, and EZweb, and later compiled into one game released internationally for iOS and WiiWare.

== Gameplay ==
The player controls Hitoshi Susumu, a businessman who is running late, as he runs forward in a two-dimensional perspective and avoids a variety of obstacles on his way to reach each level's goal line, where a dance party is being held. Each level has a time limit, and the player must try to avoid slowing down by colliding with people, objects, and creatures, and must collect time and speed bonus balloons to ensure that Susumu can complete the level before time runs out. As Susumu runs automatically, the single button or touch screen available to the player will either make Susumu jump, or if an obstacle is nearby, Susumu will dodge or surmount the obstacle if the button is pressed with the appropriate timing, with especially accurate "great" reaction times allowing Susumu to pass through the level with greater ease and speed, and offering him additional time bonuses. Occasional specific actions or collisions with obstacles send Susumu to hidden areas with no obstacles, bonus coins, and time and speed items.

As the game is played, wisecracks about what is occurring in-game scroll across the screen in the style of user comments on Japanese video-sharing website Nico Nico Douga. Once the goal line is crossed, the dance party begins, and the player can press the button or touch screen to the rhythm of the lines appearing on-screen for bonus points.

In the WiiWare version, local 2 to 4 player multiplayer versus modes are available, which include additional items that hinder the progress of the competing players when collected.

== Development ==
Motion capture performances of Japanese breakdancer ISOPP were used to create the game's animations.
