= Ephemeral Fantasia =

2000 video game

- North American PS2 box art
- Developer: KCEJ East
- Publisher: Konami
- Writer: Riku Sanjo
- Platform: PlayStation 2
- Release: JP: August 10, 2000; NA: July 9, 2001; EU: September 7, 2001
- Genre: Role-playing
- Mode: Single-player

Ephemeral Fantasia, known in Japan as Reiselied: Ephemeral Fantasia (ライゼリート エフェメラル ファンタジア, Raizerīdo Efemeraru Fantajia), is a 2000 role-playing video game developed by Konami Computer Entertainment Japan and published by Konami for the PlayStation 2. The game was released in Japan in August 2000, with international releases occurring in 2001.

== Gameplay ==
Ephemeral Fantasia features traditional role-playing video game turn-based battles, with a variety of playable characters and skills. Additionally, there is a guitar mini-game that can be played several times throughout the course of the story.

== Plot ==
Ephemeral Fantasia is similar to The Legend of Zelda: Majora's Mask in that the story transpires over a constantly looping period of five days. This is caused by a time loop created by the main antagonist, Xelpherpolis. In order for the time loop to be halted, Mouse must travel through the same five days multiple times.

This game follows Mouse, who has been summoned by a powerful figure on a remote island to compose a song. Xelpherpolis invites Mouse to play at his wedding, no doubt because of his fame as an excellent musician. Of course, Xelpherpolis doesn't expect him to solve the mystery of the island and free its inhabitants.

== Development ==
Ephemeral Fantasia was originally to be released on the Sega Dreamcast.

== Reception ==
Reception

Aggregate score
Aggregator	Score
Metacritic	48/100

Review scores
Publication	Score
Edge	6/10
Electronic Gaming Monthly	3.5/10
Game Informer	4/10
GamePro	3.5/5
GameRevolution	D−
GameSpot	5.7/10
GameSpy	40%
GameZone	6/10
IGN	4.2/10
Next Generation	1/5
Official U.S. PlayStation Magazine	1.5/5
RPGamer	2/5
RPGFan	(J.T.) 60% (M.B.) 59%

The game received "generally unfavorable reviews" according to the review aggregation website Metacritic. Francesca Reyes of NextGen said of the game, "Don't be fooled by the cute characters on the box promising console RPG goodness. You'll find none of that here. Keep moving."
