= List of Gradius media =

Gradius is a series of horizontally scrolling shooter video games developed and owned by Konami. The series debuted in arcades with Gradius in March 1985, renamed Nemesis for international versions. Games in the series have been released for several platforms, including arcade hardware, home video game consoles, handheld systems and mobile phones. The Gradius franchise consists of 16 games, including spin-offs, home conversions and compilations, as well as other forms of media such as toys, manga, soundtrack albums and literature. The series has been seen by critics as important and influential for the shoot'em up genre, inspiring games such as R-Type, Thunder Force and Darius, as well as setting the template for horizontal-scrolling shooters as a whole. It is Konami's most successful shooter series and one of the company's core franchises.

== Video games ==
Game	Details
Gradius Original release date(s): NA: 1985; JP: May 29, 1985; EU: September 1985	Release years by system: 1985 – Arcade, Famicom; 2003 – Mobile
Gradius Original release date(s): NA: 1985; JP: May 29, 1985; EU: September 1985	Notes: Released as Nemesis in Europe.; Included in Gradius Deluxe Pack for PlayStation, Saturn, and Windows in 1996.; Included in Gradius Collection for PlayStation Portable in 2006.; Included in Konami Classics Series: Arcade Hits for Nintendo DS in 2007.
Salamander Original release date(s): NA: August 1, 1988; JP: July 4, 1986; EU: 1986	Release years by system: 1986 – Arcade, Famicom
Salamander Original release date(s): NA: August 1, 1988; JP: July 4, 1986; EU: 1986	Notes: Released as Life Force in North America.; Included in Salamander Deluxe Pack Plus compilation for PlayStation and Saturn in 1997.; Included in Salamander Portable for PlayStation Portable in 2007.
Gradius 2 Original release date(s): JP: August 22, 1987	Release years by system: 1987 – MSX
Gradius 2 Original release date(s): JP: August 22, 1987	Notes: A remake, Nemesis '90 Kai, was released in 1993 for the X68000.; Included in Salamander Portable for PlayStation Portable in 2007.
Gradius II Original release date(s): JP: March 24, 1988; EU: 1988	Release years by system: 1988 – Arcade, Famicom
Gradius II Original release date(s): JP: March 24, 1988; EU: 1988	Notes: Released as Vulcan Venture in Europe.; Ported for Famicom (the Japanese equivalent to a Nintendo Entertainment System, or NES) in Japan later the same year.; Included in Gradius Deluxe Pack for PlayStation, Saturn, and Windows in 1996.; Included in Gradius Collection for PlayStation Portable in 2006.
Nemesis 3: The Eve of Destruction Original release date(s): JP: January 27, 1989	Release years by system: 1988 – MSX
Nemesis 3: The Eve of Destruction Original release date(s): JP: January 27, 1989	Notes: Known as Gofer no Yabō Episode II in Japan.
Gradius III Original release date(s): JP: December 11, 1989	Release years by system: 1989 – Arcade
Gradius III Original release date(s): JP: December 11, 1989	Notes: Ported to the Super NES in 1991.; While the original arcade version was never released outside Japan, it was included in Gradius III and IV for PlayStation 2 in 2000 and in Gradius Collection for PlayStation Portable in 2006.
Nemesis Original release date(s): JP: February 23, 1990; NA: April 1990; EU: 1991	Release years by system: 1990 – Game Boy
Gradius: The Interstellar Assault Original release date(s): JP: August 9, 1991; NA: January 1992; EU: 1992	Release years by system: 1991 – Game Boy
Gradius: The Interstellar Assault Original release date(s): JP: August 9, 1991; NA: January 1992; EU: 1992	Notes: Released with the subtitle Return of the Hero in Europe and in North America as Gradius: The Interstellar Assault.
Salamander 2 Original release date(s): JP: January 1996	Release years by system: 1996 – Arcade
Salamander 2 Original release date(s): JP: January 1996	Notes: Included in Salamander Deluxe Pack Plus for PlayStation and Saturn in 1997.; Included in Salamander Portable for PlayStation Portable in 2007.
Gradius Gaiden Original release date(s): JP: August 28, 1997	Release years by system: 1997 – PlayStation
Gradius Gaiden Original release date(s): JP: August 28, 1997	Notes: First title to be released exclusively for home consoles.; Original version was never released in North America or Europe.; Included in Gradius Collection for PlayStation Portable in 2006.
Gradius IV Original release date(s): JP: February 4, 1999	Release years by system: 1999 – Arcade
Gradius IV Original release date(s): JP: February 4, 1999	Notes: Allowed players for a limited time to submit scores to an Internet-based ranking system.; Included in Gradius III and IV for PlayStation 2 in 2000 and Gradius Collection for PlayStation Portable in 2006.
Gradius Galaxies Original release date(s): NA: November 12, 2001; JP: January 17, 2002; EU: November 9, 2001	Release years by system: 2001 – Game Boy Advance
Gradius Galaxies Original release date(s): NA: November 12, 2001; JP: January 17, 2002; EU: November 9, 2001	Notes: Released as Gradius Advance in Europe, and as Gradius Generation in Japan.
Gradius V Original release date(s): NA: September 14, 2004; JP: July 22, 2004; EU: October 8, 2004	Release years by system: 2004 – PlayStation 2
Gradius V Original release date(s): NA: September 14, 2004; JP: July 22, 2004; EU: October 8, 2004	Notes: The result of a collaboration between KCET and Treasure.
Gradius NEO Original release date(s): JP: 2004	Release years by system: 2004 – Japanese mobile phones
Gradius NEO Original release date(s): JP: 2004	Notes: Released exclusively for mobile phones in Japan.
Gradius NEO Imperial Original release date(s): JP: July 2004	Release years by system: 2004 – Japanese mobile phones
Gradius NEO Imperial Original release date(s): JP: July 2004	Notes: Released exclusively for mobile phones in Japan.
Gradius ReBirth Original release date(s): NA: March 9, 2009; JP: September 2, 2008; EU: July 3, 2009	Release years by system: 2008 – Wii
Gradius ReBirth Original release date(s): NA: March 9, 2009; JP: September 2, 2008; EU: July 3, 2009	Notes: Released as a WiiWare game.; An update was released for the game on the Wii Shop Channel free of charge. It improves some of the visuals and the scoring system, in addition to adding some new music and making changes to the levels.

=== Spin-offs ===
Game	Details
Falsion Original release date(s): JP: October 21, 1987	Release years by system: 1987 – Famicom Disk System
Parodius Original release date(s): JP: 1988	Release years by system: 1988 - MSX; 2006 - Mobile Phone; 2010 - Wii Virtual Console; 2013 - Wii U Virtual Console; 2014 - Project EGG (Windows PC)
Parodius Original release date(s): JP: 1988	Notes: Parody of the Gradius series.
Piccadilly Gradius Original release date(s): JP: 1989	Release years by system: 1989 - Redemption game
Piccadilly Gradius Original release date(s): JP: 1989	Notes: A redemption game of the Gradius series.
Cosmic Wars Original release date(s): JP: August 4, 1989	Release years by system: 1989 – Nintendo Entertainment System
Cosmic Wars Original release date(s): JP: August 4, 1989	Notes: Strategy game based on the Gradius series.
Parodius Da! Original release date(s): JP: 1990	Release years by system: 1990 - Arcade
Fantastic Parodius Original release date(s): JP: 1994	Release years by system: 1994 - Arcade
Fantastic Parodius Original release date(s): JP: 1994	Notes: Known as Gokujō Parodius! ～Kako no Eikō o Motomete～ in Japan.
Jikkyō Oshaberi Parodius Original release date(s): JP: 1995	Release years by system: 1995 - Super Famicom
Sexy Parodius Original release date(s): JP: March 1996	Release years by system: 1996 - Arcade; 1997 - PlayStation, Saturn
Paro Wars Original release date(s): JP: 1997	Release years by system: 1997 - PlayStation
Solar Assault Original release date(s): JP: July 1997; NA: 1997	Release years by system: 1997 – Arcade
Solar Assault Original release date(s): JP: July 1997; NA: 1997	Notes: An update titled Solar Assault Revised was released in late 1997.
Little Pirates Original release date(s): JP: 1998	Release years by system: 1998 – Pachislot
Little Pirates Original release date(s): JP: 1998	Notes: Released exclusively for Pachislot in Japan.
CR Parodius Da! Original release date(s): JP: 2000	Release years by system: 2000 – Pachinko
CR Parodius Da! Original release date(s): JP: 2000	Notes: Released exclusively for Pachinko in Japan.
CR Saikoro Tin Douty Original release date(s): JP: August 2004	Release years by system: 2004 – Pachinko
CR Saikoro Tin Douty Original release date(s): JP: August 2004	Notes: Released exclusively for Pachinko in Japan.; This Pachinko featuring by Saikoro an girl was alive in the Japanese Ancient.; Press the button and roll the dice when they leave three penguins, appears in Parodius Characters, Including Koitsu, Hiakru, Pentarou, Anna Barbowa and Meroowa and Moai Battleship.; Contain the CR Parodius Da! BGM in this Video.
CR Gokujo Parodius Original release date(s): JP: May 2006	Release years by system: 2006 – Pachinko
CR Gokujo Parodius Original release date(s): JP: May 2006	Notes: Released exclusively for Pachinko in Japan.
Otomedius Original release date(s): JP: 2007	Release years by system: 2007 – Arcade, Xbox 360
Otomedius Original release date(s): JP: 2007	Notes: Released exclusively for Arcade and Xbox 360 in Japan.
Gradius Arc: Legend of the Silver Wings Original release date(s): JP: September 2010	Release years by system: 2010 – Japanese mobile phones
Gradius Arc: Legend of the Silver Wings Original release date(s): JP: September 2010	Notes: Strategy game spinoff released exclusively for mobile phones in Japan.
Gokuraku Parodius Original release date(s): JP: September 2010	Release years by system: 2010 – Pachislot
Gokuraku Parodius Original release date(s): JP: September 2010	Notes: Released exclusively for Pachislot in Japan.
Otomedius Excellent Original release date(s): JP: 2011; NA: 2011	Release years by system: 2011 – Xbox 360
Gradius: The Slot Original release date(s): JP: July 2011	Release years by system: 2011 – Pachislot
Gradius: The Slot Original release date(s): JP: July 2011	Notes: Released exclusively for Pachislot in Japan.

=== Compilations and collections ===
The Gradius games have spawned a number of sequels. Being a prominent series in the shoot 'em up genre, the titles have become classics and thus have been repackaged and rebundled in several versions. These releases contain extra features and bonuses such as enhanced artwork, expanded soundtracks, and story materials.

Game	Details
Gokujō Parodius Da! Deluxe Pack Original release date(s): JP: December 3, 1994; EU: January 1996	Release years by system: 1994 — PlayStation, Saturn
Gokujō Parodius Da! Deluxe Pack Original release date(s): JP: December 3, 1994; EU: January 1996	Notes: Compilation of the arcade releases of Parodius Da! and Fantastic Parodius.; Never released in North America.
Gradius Deluxe Pack Original release date(s): JP: March 29, 1996	Release years by system: 1996 — PlayStation, Saturn, Windows
Gradius Deluxe Pack Original release date(s): JP: March 29, 1996	Notes: Compilation of Gradius and Gradius II.; Includes an introductory sequence created using Computer-generated imagery.; Never released in North America or Europe.
Salamander Deluxe Pack Plus Original release date(s): JP: June 19, 1997	Release years by system: 1997 — PlayStation, Saturn
Salamander Deluxe Pack Plus Original release date(s): JP: June 19, 1997	Notes: Compilation of the arcade releases of Salamander, Life Force and Salamander 2.; Includes an introductory CGI sequence.; Never released in North America or Europe.
Konami GB Collection Original release date(s): JP: December 11, 1997; EU: May 2000	Release years by system: 1997 — Game Boy; 2000 — Game Boy Color
Konami GB Collection Original release date(s): JP: December 11, 1997; EU: May 2000	Notes: Vol. 1 features Gradius; Vol. 3 (Vol. 4 in Europe) features Gradius: The Interstellar Assault; Vol. 4 (Vol. 2 in Europe) features Parodius Da!; Never released in North America.
Gradius III and IV Original release date(s): JP: April 13, 2000; NA: November 13, 2000; EU: November 24, 2000	Release years by system: 2000 — PlayStation 2
Gradius III and IV Original release date(s): JP: April 13, 2000; NA: November 13, 2000; EU: November 24, 2000	Notes: Compilation of Gradius III and Gradius IV.; Includes an introductory CGI sequence.; Released in Japan with the subtitle ~Fukkatsu no Shinwa~ (lit. "Myth of Revival").
Gradius Collection Original release date(s): JP: February 9, 2006; NA: June 6, 2006; EU: September 14, 2006	Release years by system: 2006 — PlayStation Portable
Gradius Collection Original release date(s): JP: February 9, 2006; NA: June 6, 2006; EU: September 14, 2006	Notes: Compilation of Gradius, Gradius II, Gradius III, Gradius IV and Gradius Gaiden.; Released as Gradius Portable in Japan.; Includes music and movie galleries with content from previous console releases.
Salamander Portable Original release date(s): JP: January 24, 2007	Release years by system: 2007 — PlayStation Portable
Salamander Portable Original release date(s): JP: January 24, 2007	Notes: Compilation of the arcade releases of Salamander, Life Force, Salamander 2, Nemesis 2 and Xexex.
Parodius Portable Original release date(s): JP: January 25, 2007	Release years by system: 2007 — PlayStation Portable
Parodius Portable Original release date(s): JP: January 25, 2007	Notes: Compilation of Parodius, Parodius Da!, Fantastic Parodius, Jikkyō Oshaberi Parodius and Sexy Parodius.
Gradius Origins Original release date(s): WW: August 7, 2025	Release years by system: 2025 - Nintendo Switch, PlayStation 5, Windows, Xbox Series X and Series S
Gradius Origins Original release date(s): WW: August 7, 2025	Notes: Developed by M2.; Compilation of the arcade releases of Gradius, Gradius II, Gradius III, Salamander, Life Force, Salamander 2, and the new game Salamander III.; Released as Gradius Origin Collection in Japan.

== Merchandise ==
- Gradius Board Game
- Parodius Plush, Grape, Purple, Blue and Pirate Penguin
- Parodius Da! Pencil Board by Shitajiki
- Gradius Portable Cleaner
- Otomedius Pillow
- Paro Wars the Board Game (1998)
- MSX Salamander (Keychain)
- Gokujo Parodius (Mini-Notebook and Keychain Issue) from Gacha
- Gokujo Parodius (Cards) from Card Jan
- Goku Paro Free (極パロフリー, Goku parofurī)
- Tako Plush from ItemLab
- Gokujo Parodius from MEF & Team Strike!
- Otomedius Cellphone
- Otomedius Pin Aoba Anoa
- Gradius Pins
- Otomedius Big Doll
- Otomedius Keyrings
- Otomedius Action Figure
- Gradius (M/L/XL) (Konami Official Tee ↑↑↓↓←→←→BA)
- Gradius and Salamander Acrylic Figure Collection (5 Random Designs)

== Video collections ==
Konami Video Collection Original Game BGV Konami Best Vol.1 — 1987 — VHS
- This VHS Contain a TwinBee, Gradius & Contra.

Salamander — 1988 — VHS
- A three-volume OVA series based on the arcade games Salamander, Gradius, and Gradius II.

Salamander Game Simulation Video — 1988 — VHS
- An expert playthrough of Salamander.

Gradius III Game Simulation Video — 1991 — VHS
- An expert playthrough of Gradius III.

King CGV Series Parodius Da! Shinwa Kara Owarai He — 1991 — VHS

Gamest Video Gokujo Parodius! — 1994 — VHS

Gradius V Options — 2004 — DVD
- A promotional DVD given away with Gradius V in Japan as a bonus to preordering customers.
- Contains interviews with the developers, an expert playthrough of stage five and an image gallery of enemies encountered in the game.

Gradius V Official DVD The Perfect — 2004 — DVD
- Contains a complete set of "super-play" videos.

Gradius Breakdown — 2004 — DVD
- A promotional DVD released shortly after Gradius V in North America as a preorder bonus.
- Contains a series retrospective, enemy database, an interview with the game director and a collection of "super-play" videos.

== Printed media ==
Gradius Complete Works — 1986 — ISBN 4-576-86067-4
- Japanese title: グラディウス 裏ワザ大全集 別巻 (guradiusu urawaza daisenshō)

Gradius: Michi Tono Tatakai — 1986 — ISBN 4-575-76012-9
- Released for manga in August 1986 in Japan.
- Japanese title: グラディウス―未知との戦い (guradiusu michi tono tatakai)

Gradius Hisshō Kōryaku Hō — 1986 — ISBN 4-575-15044-4
- Japanese title: グラディウス 必勝攻略法 (Guradiusu hisshō kōryaku-hō)

Famicom Ryu — 1985-1987 — ISBN 409141141X
- Japanese title: ファミ拳リュウ (Famikon Fiuun)
- A Japanese manga by Haruo Saito.
- Published by Comic Bombom
- Gradius, was featuring by Manga.

Nekketsu! Famicom Shounendan — 1986-1987 — ISBN 409141141X
- Japanese title: 熱血!ファミコン少年団 (Nekketsu! Famikon Shōnen-dan)
- A Japanese manga by Haruo Saito.
- Published by Comic Bombom
- Gradius, was featuring by Manga.

Gradius II Bible — 1988 — ISBN 4-87655-025-5
- Published by Konami.
- Japanese title: グラディウスII バイブル (guradiusu II baiburu)

Gradius II Perfect Technique Book — 1989 — ISBN 4-88658-133-1
- Japanese title: グラディウス2完全攻略テクニックブック (guradiusu II kanzen kōryaku tekunikku bukku)

Rock'n Game Boy — 1989-1991 — ISBN 4061005871
- Japanese title: ロックンゲームボーイ (Rokkun Gēmu Bōi)
- A Japanese manga by Shigeto Ikehara.
- Published by Comic Bombom
- Gradius and Parodius Da!, was featuring by Manga.

Cyber Boy — 1991-1993 — ISBN 4061005871
- Japanese title: 電脳ボーイ (Dennou Bōi)
- A Japanese manga by Nagai Noriaki.
- Published by Comic Bombom
- Gradius, was featuring by Manga.

Gokujyō Parodius (1) Namie Iwao — 1995 — ISBN 4-88199-174-4
- Japanese title: 極上パロディウス (1) 岩尾奈美恵 (Gokujō parodiusu (1 ) iwao namie)

Gradius Portable Official Guide — 2006 — ISBN 4-86155-111-0
- Published by Konami on March 28, 2006.
- A 192-page book in colour with artwork, series history and guide for Gradius I-IV and Gradius Gaiden.
- Japanese title: グラディウス ポータブル 公式ガイド ~レジェンド オブ I・II・III・IV・外伝~

Shūtingugēmusaido Vol. 2 (Gēmusaido bukkusu) — 2011 — ISBN 4-86155-111-0
- Published by Konami on March 28, 2006.
- A Pages was contain as, Gradius, Parodius and Otomedius.
- Japanese title: シューティングゲームサイドVol.2 (GAMESIDE BOOKS)

Gradius Origin Collection Official Book — 2025
- Published by Konami on 2025.
- A Contains a Gradius, Gradius II, Gradius III, Salamander, Life Force, Salamander 2, and Salamander 3.
- Japanese title: グラディウス オリジンコレクション オフィシャルブック

== Music albums ==
Original Sound of Gradius & Salamander: Battle Music Collection — 1987 — Compact disc
- Soundtrack by Konami Kukeiha Club for Gradius, Gradius 2 and Salamander.
- Released in Japan by King Records on November 21, 1987.

The Konamic Game Freaks — 1987 — Compact Disc
- Soundtrack by Konami Kukeiha Club was contain a Salamander.
- Released in Japan by King Records on March 25, 1987.

Beep Magazine Vol.3 - Konami Game Music Sono Sheet — 1987 — Compact Disc
- Soundtrack by Softbank Publishing for Gradius, Salamander, WEC Le Mans 24, Koi no Hot Rock and RF2.
- Released in Japan by King Records in March 1987.

SUITE GRADIUS Fantasia — 1988 — Cassette
- Cassette Original Soundtrack by Konami Industry Co., Ltd.
- Released in Japan by Soundtrack by Apollon Music Industrial Corp. on November 21, 1988.

Space Odyssey Gradius II ~GOFER no Yabou~ — 1988 — Cassette
- Soundtrack by Konami Industry Co., Ltd for Gradius II.
- Released in Japan by Soundtrack by Apollon Music Industrial Corp. on July 21, 1988.

Konami Game Music Special — 1988 — Compact Disc
- Soundtrack by Konami Industry Co., Ltd, contain a Gradius.
- Released in Japan by Soundtrack by Apollon Music Industrial Corp. on August 25, 1988.

Konami Famicom Music Memorial Best Vol.1 — 1989 — Compact Disc
- Soundtrack by Konami Industry Co., Ltd for Gradius II.
- Released in Japan by Soundtrack by Apollon Music Industrial Corp. on July 21, 1989.

Konami Special Music Senryoubako — 1990 — Compact Disc
- Soundtrack by Konami Kukeiha Club for ?.
- Released in Japan by King Records on December 21, 1989.

Kukeiha Club — 1990 — Compact Disc
- Soundtrack by Konami Kukeiha Club, Contain a Gradius.
- Released in Japan by King Records on November 21, 1990.

Gradius III — 1990 — Compact Disc
- Soundtrack by Konami Kukeiha Club for Gradius III.
- Released in Japan by King Records on February 21, 1990.

Perfect Selection Gradius — 1991 — Compact Disc
- Soundtrack by Konami Kukeiha Club for Gradius, Gradius II and Gradius III.
- Released in Japan by King Records on November 21, 1991.

Perfect Selection Gradius — 1991 — Compact Disc
- Released in Japan by King Records on December 21, 1991.

Perfect Selection Gradius Part 2 — 1992 — Compact Disc
- Soundtrack by Konami Kukeiha Club for Gradius, Gradius 2, Gofer no Yabō Episode II and Gradius III.
- Released in Japan by King Records on November 6, 1992.

Konami All-Stars 1993~Yume no Music Station — 1992 — Compact Disc
- Released in Japan by King Records on December 24, 1992.

MIDI Power X68000 Collection ver 3.0 — 1993 — Compact Disc
- Soundtrack by Konami Kukeiha Club, Contain a Gradius III.
- Released in Japan by King Records on July 21, 1993.

Konami GM Hits Factory II — 1993 — Compact Disc
- Soundtrack by Konami Kukeiha Club for complication of Salamander, Gradius II and Gradius III.
- Released in Japan by King Records on October 22, 1993.

Gradius In Classic I & II — 1993 — Compact Disc
- Soundtrack by Konami Kukeiha Club for Gradius, Gradius II, Gofer no Yabō Episode II and Gradius III.
- Released in Japan by King Records on December 22, 1993.

PERFECT SELECTION KONAMI SHOOTING BATTLE II — 1995 — Compact Disc
- ?.
- Released in Japan by Konami Co., Ltd on November 22, 1995

Salamander 2 Original Game Soundtrack — 1996 — Compact Disc
- 1-disc soundtrack by Konami Kukeiha Club for Salamander 2.
- Released in Japan by Konami Co., Ltd on April 5, 1996.

Gradius Gaiden Original Game Soundtrack — 1997 — Compact Disc
- 1-disc soundtrack by Konami Kukeiha Club for Gradius Gaiden.
- Released in Japan by Konami Co., Ltd on December 22, 1997.

Konami MSX Super Best Antiques — 1998 — Cassette
- Soundtrack by Konami Industry Co., Ltd for all games.
- Released in Japan by Soundtrack by Apollon Music Industrial Corp. on September 23, 1988.

Gradius IV Fukkatsu Original Game Soundtrack — 1999 — Compact disc
- A 1-disc soundtrack for Gradius IV.
- Released in Japan by Konami on March 5, 1999.
- One of a few soundtracks not composed by Konami Kukeiha Club, but by Japanese artist "Atsuki"

Konami Game Music Vol.1 — 2000 — Compact Disc
- A 1-disc soundtrack for ?.
- Released in Japan by Konami on November 1, 2000.
- One of a few soundtracks not composed by Konami Kukeiha Club, but by Japanese artist "Atsuki"

Gradius Arcade Soundtrack — 2002 — Compact Disc
- A 2-disc collection of background music and arrangements by Konami Kukeiha Club.
- Released in Japan by Konami Music Entertainment Inc. on April 24, 2002."

Salamander Arcade Soundtrack — 2003 — Compact Disc
- 1-disc album containing the background music heard in Salamander, Life Force, and Salamander 2
- Produced by Konami Kukeiha Club. Arrangements by Motoaki Furukawa.
- Released in Japan by Konami Music Entertainment Inc. on April 9, 2003.

Konami Music Masterpiece Collection — 2004 — Compact Disc
- ?.
- Composed by Konami Kukeiha Club and released in Japan on October 1, 2004.

Gradius V Soundtracks — 2004 — Compact Disc
- Official soundtrack for Gradius V, composed by Hitoshi Sakimoto.
- Released in Japan by Konami Media Entertainment, Inc. on August 18, 2004.

UNDER THE BLUE SKY ~include GRADIUS arrange~ — 2005 — Compact Disc
- By MOTOAKI FURUKAWA.
- Released in Japan by Konami Media Entertainment, Inc. on June 6, 2005.

Legend of Game Music ~Premium Box~ — 2005 — Compact Disc
- Released in Japan by Scitron Digital Contents. on March 24, 2005.

Gradius Tribute — 2006 — Compact Disc
- Released in Japan by Konami Media Entertainment, Inc. on December 20, 2006.

Konami Addiction ~For Electro Lovers~ — 2008 — Compact Disc
- Released in Japan by Konami Media Entertainment, Inc. on May 21, 2008.

GRADIUS house ReMix — 2009 — Compact Disc
- Arrangements from Gradius and Gradius II composed by Konami Kukeiha Club.
- Released in Japan by Konami Media Entertainment, Inc. on February 27, 2009 .

GRADIUS THE SLOT ORIGINAL SOUNDTRACK — 2011 — Compact Disc
- Official soundtrack for Gradius: The Slot, composed by Nano, Satoshi Yamada.
- Released in Japan by Konami Media Entertainment, Inc. on September 21, 2011.

KONAMI SHOOTING COLLECTION — 2011 — Compact Disc
- Commercial Soundtrack of 10 CDs.
- Released in Japan by Konami Media Entertainment, Inc. on September 22, 2011.

FALSION SOUNDTRACKS — 2014 — Compact Disc
- Commercial Soundtrack of 1 CD.
- Composed by Shinya Sakamoto, Shigehiro Takenouchi and Atsushi Fujio
- Arranged by Sukenomiya Fujio
- Released in Japan by EGG Music and Konami Kukeiha Club on April 30, 2014.
