= Gradius Gaiden =

1997 video game

- Developer: KCET
- Publisher: Konami
- Director: Teisaku Seki
- Producer: Kazumi Kitaue
- Designers: Kei Chigasaki; Takayuki Kobayashi
- Programmers: Keiichi Isobe; Yukihiro Yamazaki
- Composer: Norikazu Miura
- Series: Gradius
- Platform: PlayStation
- Release: JP: August 28, 1997
- Genre: Scrolling shooter
- Modes: Single-player, multiplayer

Gradius Gaiden (Note: Japanese: グラディウス外伝, Hepburn: Gradiusu Gaiden) is a 1997 horizontal scrolling shooter video game developed and published by Konami for the PlayStation. Players control one of four different starships in their mission to eradicate the Bacteria army from destroying the planet Gradius. Gameplay involves shooting down enemies, avoiding their projectiles, and collecting power capsules to unlock access to new weapons. It is the fourth mainline entry in the company's Gradius franchise.

Directed by Seki Teisaku, Gaiden was created to refine and build on the core Gradius gameplay, and to create a new, exciting shooter for a home console in mind; as such, the name "Gaiden" was chosen, being the Japanese word for "side-story". Konami worked to make the game stand out from other Gradius games with unique, creative level designs and all-new mechanics, such as a selection of playable ships, new weapons types, and the ability to swap items in the player's "Power Meter". Some mechanics were also created specifically to take advantage of the PlayStation's hardware capabilities, such as its rotation and transparency effects. The game was completed in less than a year.

Gradius Gaiden was acclaimed for its visuals, gameplay, soundtrack and creativity, and is seen as one of the best games in the Gradius series. Others felt it relied largely on fan service, and became too difficult at times. The game never saw a release outside Japan until the release of Gradius Collection in 2006 for the PlayStation Portable. In 2019, it was included in the Japanese version of the PlayStation Classic mini console.

== Gameplay ==
The Lord British firing the Disruptor laser into a crystal, reflecting it in another direction

Gradius Gaiden is a horizontally scrolling shooter game where the player controls one of four different starships — the Vic Viper, Lord British, Jade Knight and Falchion β — in their mission to eradicate the Bacterian army before they destroy the planet Gradius. Gameplay itself remains relatively the same compared to previous installments; the player must complete each of the game's stages while shooting down enemies and avoiding collision with either them, their projectiles, or the terrain. Some enemies drop glowing Power Capsules when destroyed, which when collected will highlight a weapon on the player's "Power Meter", located at the bottom corner of the screen. Collecting additional Power Capsules will give the player access to better, stronger weapons. These weapons include missiles, a double shot, lasers, and glowing orbs known as "Options" that follow the player and will fight alongside them.

Gradius Gaiden features many new additions to the core gameplay. It was the first game in the series to include two-player simultaneous play. Each of the player's four ships feature their own unique set of weapons; the Vic Viper features the standard Gradius arsenal of weapons; the Lord British features the Ripple Laser from Salamander and a pulsating shot named the "Disruptor"; the Jade Knight has a "Circle Laser" that creates deadly rings surrounding it; the Falchion β has a powerful "Black Hole Bomb" projectile that will suck in any enemies it comes into contact with. At the start of the game, the player can modify the placement of items in their Power Meter to their liking; for instance, the Options can be moved to the very front of their meter, requiring only one Power Capsule. Two new shields were added; the Guard, which makes the player invulnerable to terrain, and the Limit, which gives the player full invincibility for three seconds.

== Development ==
The development team for Gradius Gaiden heavily focused on designing new, interesting stages; the first level, "Beyond the White Storm", features a snow theme that staff thought would be a fresh idea and surprise players.

Gradius Gaiden was directed by Seki Teisaku. He was assisted in production by designers Kobayashi Takayki and Chigasaki Kei, sound designer Miura Norikazu, and programmers Yamazaki Yukihiro and Isobe Neiichi, among others. Most of the staff behind the project previously worked on Gradius Deluxe Pack (1996), a compilation of Gradius and Gradius II the Sega Saturn and PlayStation. This familiarized them with the core mechanics of the Gradius series. Teisaku's goal was to refine and build upon many of the franchise's pre-existing concepts and ideas, while simultaneously providing an exciting and new experience for shooter fans. For this reason, team chose to name it Gaiden, the Japanese term for "side-story". This also allowed them to experiment with different ideas; while the name Gradius IV was considered, it was dropped to prevent them from sticking only to mechanics established in earlier installments.

Development of Gradius Gaiden lasted for less than a year. The game was developed for a home console in mind; as previous Gradius games were developed for arcades, they were designed to be purposefully difficult. This allowed the team to make the difficulty far more balanced and fair, and allow players to improve their skills as they progressed. Teisaku and his colleagues retained elements they considered fun to use and "essential" to the series, namely the power meter system. Gaiden originally began as a single-player game, with a multiplayer mode added later on. During production of the multiplayer mode, the team needed another ship that could be distinguished from the player's own. The Lord British, the second-player ship from the Gradius spin-off Salamander, was added to accompany the default Vic Viper. Two new ships were added alongside them, the Jade Knight and the Falsion β.

One of the biggest things the team focused on was the level design. Takayuki and others wanted the levels in Gaiden to be unique and distinct from those found in previous Gradius games. The game's first level, "Beyond the White Storm", was chosen to surprise players and to be fresh. Takayuki and others chose a snow theme for the level which had never been used in a Gradius title up to that point. The development team wanted to have stages feature unique mechanics that made them stand out from other level types in the series, such as the remains of bosses in the second stage and the laser-reflecting crystals in the third stage. Some levels were also designed to take advantage of the PlayStation's hardware capabilities, namely the rotating Moai statues in the fourth stage. The development team toyed with the idea of a "sea of mud" level that slowed down the player's ship, which was scrapped for it not being fun to play.

The concept of rearranging the weapons in the power meter was based on the "meter edit" mode in Gradius III, which allowed players to change the weapon types in their power meter before beginning the game. The team thought it was a fun idea, and decided to implement it into Gaiden. Four shield types were added to complement the four playable ships; the "Guard" came from Neichii being generally bad at Gradius games and always dying when colliding with the ground, while the Limit was based on an idea of having a shield that was about time instead of its durability. The game's "second loop" was created as fan service, being the team's way of thanking players who played the game extensively.

== Release ==
Gradius Gaiden was released on August 28, 1997, in Japan. On July 30, 1998, it was re-released as part of the "PlayStation the Best" budget game label, and again on November 20, 2003, as part of the PSone Books collection. Konami announced that the game would be released in the U.S. as part of a bundle with Salamander Deluxe Pack Plus in December 1997, however, it was later cancelled. In 2006, Gradius Gaiden was compiled into Gradius Collection, alongside Gradius, Gradius II, Gradius III and Gradius IV. This version of the game removed the multiplayer mode and suffers from slowdown in some areas. Gradius Gaiden is one of twenty games included in the Japanese version of the PlayStation Classic mini console, released in 2019.

== Reception ==
Reception

Review scores
Publication	Score
Consoles +	90/100
Famitsu	29/40
GameSpot	7.9/10
M! Games	8/10
Super Game Power	4/5
Ação Games	9/10
Dengeki PlayStation	80/100, 85/100, 85/100, 95/100

Gradius Gaiden was well received by critics, and is seen as one of the best games in the Gradius franchise. It sold a total of 34,383 copies in its lifetime.

Several expressed admiration towards its visuals and graphical style. GameSpot's Chris Johnston felt that, while not as impressive as those in RayStorm or Star Fox 64, were excellent, especially its detailed backgrounds. Lord Mathias of Super GamePower found them to be well-designed and vibrant, and posing some impressive transparency and rotation effects; a writer for Ação Games agreed. The four reviewers from Famitsu stated it was one of the best-looking shooters on the PlayStation, as did Super Juegos. The soundtrack also received praise, with Ação Games saying it had some of the best tracks in the series. Johnston believed Gaiden possessed some well-made music, but that it wasn't as good as earlier Gradius games.

Critics commended Gaiden's gameplay and design. Johnston said the balanced difficulty and fun mechanics made it a solid entry in the franchise, with Ação Games agreeing. Super Juegos enjoyed its style and innovation for building on the Gradius gameplay in a way that made the game feel fresh and new; they favorably compared it to Konami's own Castlevania: Symphony of the Night for this reason. Super Juegos and Ação Games also found it to be one of the best games in the franchise up to that point, with Ação Games labeling it a "sensational" shooter. The level design was also the subject of praise for its creativity and originality, although Famitsu staff felt it relied too heavily on Gradius fan service. Johnston recommended the game to shooter fans for its import-friendly nature. In his review for Gradius Collection, GameSpot's Greg Kasavin felt that Gaiden was the stand-out game in the collection for its visuals, gameplay and short loading times.

In a 2017 retrospective review, Kurt Kalata of Hardcore Gaming 101 labeled Gaiden as "The perfect example of how to evolve the series", and the Gradius equivalent to Castlevania: Symphony of the Night. He commended the game's colorful, detailed graphics, soundtrack, and level designs, and praised its creativity and overall quality. Kalata also praised the game's weapon system and new shields, although felt that neither of these were as good as the ones in its predecessor Gradius III. He wrote: "Gradius Gaiden is a fantastic game – it's really a toss-up between this and Gradius V as to which is the best." Writing for Retronauts, Jeremy Parish called it "The glorious high point of classic Gradius", and felt that it alone justified the purchase of Gradius Collection.
