= Nemesis (video game) =

1990 video game

- North American box art
- Developer: Konami
- Publishers: JP: Konami; NA: Ultra Games
- Designer: Naoki Matsui
- Composers: Michiru Yamane; Tomoya Tomita
- Series: Gradius
- Platform: Game Boy
- Release: JP: February 23, 1990; NA: April 1990; EU: September 1992; JP: September 25, 1997 (Konami GB Collection Vol.1); EU: 2000 (Konami GB Collection Vol.1)
- Genre: Scrolling shooter
- Mode: Single-player

Nemesis (Note: Japanese: ネメシス, Hepburn: Nemeshisu) is a 1990 horizontally scrolling shooter video game developed and published by Konami for the Game Boy. It is part of the Gradius series. Similar to Taito's Sagaia, this game uses a once-international title for an earlier game in the series to represent a mostly original project.

A sequel, Gradius: The Interstellar Assault, was released for the same platform in 1991. Both games were later rereleased through the Konami GB Collection series, where they are titled Gradius and Gradius II instead.

== Gameplay ==
Nemesis retains the basic power-up meter commonly used in most Gradius games, but with the addition of multi-level missiles not present in the original Gradius.

The game consists of only five stages, each with a unique core boss. Although it is also possible to access hidden bonus stages in which the player may collect 1-ups and score bonus cells. Like other Game Boy titles developed by Konami, the game presents the player with a stage selection screen before starting.

== Release and reception ==
Reception

Review scores
Publication	Score
Famitsu	7/10, 7/10, 8/10, 8/10
Total!	92%
Video Games (DE)	83%

Nemesis was released in Japan for the Game Boy on February 23, 1990. The four reviewers in Famicom Tsūshin all complimented the game saying it was made version of Gradius with some of the reviewers complimenting teh sense of speed, detailed graphics and the ability to use rapid-fire and stage select options. While one reviewer complimented the how well it played on the Game Boy, they found that the games small screen and slightly delayed movement as problematic.

Steve Jarratt of Total! described it as a "superb version of a classic coin-op."
