= Nemesis 3: The Eve of Destruction =

1988 video game

- Developer: Konami
- Publisher: Konami
- Composers: Michiru Yamane; Kazuhiko Uehara; Motoaki Furukawa; Yukie Morimoto; Masahiro Ikariko
- Series: Gradius
- Platform: MSX
- Release: JP: January 27, 1989; EU: 1988
- Genre: Shoot 'em up
- Mode: Single-player

Nemesis 3: The Eve of Destruction (ゴーファーの野望(やぼう)エピソードII, Gōfā no Yabō Episōdo Tsū; Gofer's Ambition Episode II) is a 1988 computer game, developed and published by Konami exclusively for the MSX platform in 1988. It was only released in Japan and Europe. The game is part of the long running Gradius series of side-scrolling shooters and is a spin-off of Gradius II: Gofer no Yabou. It is the second game of the series to be released exclusively for the MSX after Nemesis 2. In terms of the story; the game is a sequel to Gradius II, Nemesis 2, and the MSX conversion of Salamander. The game takes place almost 200 years after the crisis with Dr. Venom and James Burton has died in the year 6718. The Vic Viper is replaced by a new ship called the Vixen (4 classes); piloted by David Burton, a direct descendant of James who is assisted by his AI Gaudie.

== Gameplay ==
Four distinct classes of Vixen can be chosen. The first one resembles the original Vic Viper. The second one is a twisted version of Vic Viper, featuring the new "Photon Missile". The third one is more like Metalion from Nemesis 2, featuring "Napalm Missile" and (Extended) "Fire Blaster". The fourth one is more like the Sabel Tiger from Salamander, featuring the 2-way missile approach and "Ripple Laser". All four classes may choose between the classic "Shield" or the "Force Field", which takes less hits to expire, but protects from any direction. It is also possible to choose the behavior of "Option", from the original shadow movement, "Fixed" and "Rolling", like the "Option Warrior" from Nemesis 2.

The game retains several of the new weapons introduced in Nemesis 2 like "Up Laser", "Fire Blaster" and "Vector Laser" as well as Salamander weapons like "Meteor Laser" and "Screw Laser". This is the only game in the Nemesis series which visibly keeps track of the number of speed boosts. In order to upgrade the ship's weapons, secret spots must be found, just like the secret stages in Nemesis 2 and the predictions in Salamander.
