= Gradius 2 =

Gradius 2 may refer to:

- Gradius 2, a 1987 computer game.
- Gradius II, a 1988 arcade game.

These are two games in the same series, but they are otherwise unrelated.
