= Gradius III and IV =

- Japanese box art
- Developer: Konami
- Publisher: Konami
- Series: Gradius
- Platform: PlayStation 2
- Release: JP: April 13, 2000; NA: November 13, 2000; EU: November 24, 2000
- Genre: Shoot 'em up
- Modes: Single-player, multiplayer

Gradius III and IV (Note: Japanese: グラディウスＩＩＩ&ＩＶ ～復活の神話～, Hepburn: Guradiusu Surī ando Fō ～Fukkatsu no Shinwa～; lit. "Gradius III & IV: The Myth of Resurrection") is a video game compilation for the PlayStation 2 combining ports of the arcade versions of Gradius III (1989) and Gradius IV (1999). It was released in Japan on April 13, 2000, and North America and Europe in November 2000. The game was a launch title for the PS2 in PAL regions.

== Gameplay ==
The overall gameplay is similar to the arcade versions, but included with a stage select and option menu. The option menu is similar to the configuration menus in the arcade versions, except that the ability to save and load high scores and adjust the screen has been added. For Gradius III, the option to change the amount of lag has been added because the PS2 processor is much faster than the arcade processor and for Gradius IV, the option to change sound (stereo/mono) and screen size (PCB/full-size) has been added.

== Reception ==
Reception

Aggregate score
Aggregator	Score
Metacritic	64/100

Review scores
Publication	Score
AllGame	2/5
CNET Gamecenter	6/10
Edge	6/10
Electronic Gaming Monthly	6/10 (Note: Three critics of Electronic Gaming Monthly gave the game each a score of 7.5/10, 7/10, and 3.5/10.)
Famitsu	28/40
Game Informer	5/10
GameFan	(J.W.) 72% 54% (Note: In GameFan's viewpoint of the Japanese import, three critics gave it each a score of 47, 61, and 55.)
GameSpot	6.3/10
GameSpy	67%
IGN	6.5/10
Jeuxvideo.com	10/20
Next Generation	2/5
Official U.S. PlayStation Magazine	2.5/5

By December 25, 2000, Gradius III and IV had shipped 84,703 units in Japan alone.

The game received "mixed" reviews according to the review aggregation website Metacritic. Some critics felt that they were still fun to play, while others said they were dated and suffered from a lack of updated features. GameFan listed Gradius III as the worst of the two due to suffering from "mundane" level design, a mediocre soundtrack, and a high difficulty level. They concluded their review of the Japanese import by mockingly commenting: "Please, let the PS2 be part of your rebirth.... and not something for non-gamers to get their groove on with." Game Informer stated that neither games were bad, but were technologically unimpressive. They labeled the game as "just a classics collection being pawned off as a PS2 title", confused as to why such a compilation was even on a modern console with little to no additions made to it. GameSpot claimed that neither game was of bad quality, and that they were still fun to play, but had begun to show their age. The high difficult of both titles was also disliked by several.

The presentation of the collection itself also received a polarizing reception. While several publications praised its quality, many also expressed confusion that Konami decided to release a collection like this for a modern system. GamePro wrote that the collection itself was a nice package of old games, and that "It's nice to know that with all the hype surrounding the PlayStation 2 launch, classic gaming hasn't been completely forgotten." (Note: GamePro gave the game two 3.5/5 scores for graphics and sound, and two 4/5 scores for control and fun factor.) Jeuxvideo.com recommended the game primarily to Gradius fans, adding that its release as a launch title was "a way of welcoming PlayStation 2 with new and old, a kind of transition in kind of sweetness." Both Game Informer and Famitsu said that the pack was solid, but showed confusion towards Konami deciding to release something like it for a recently released, modern 3D game system, alongside the lack of any additional features such as graphical and sound enhancements. IGN said the game was "retro gaming done properly", but added that it appealed to a relatively niche market. AllGame was particularly negative towards the game in their review harshly criticizing the package for its difficult and technologically-inferior games. They wrote: "Gradius III and IV is only enjoyable if you equate fun with frustration, but most gamers have long since outgrown that philosophy, as have most games. Yet Gradius III and IV clings to its roots like a long rotting tooth."
