= Gradius Galaxies =

2001 video game

- North American cover art
- Developer: Mobile21
- Publisher: Konami
- Designer: Hideaki Fukutome
- Series: Gradius
- Platform: Game Boy Advance
- Release: EU: November 9, 2001; NA: November 30, 2001; JP: January 17, 2002
- Genre: Scrolling shooter
- Mode: Single-player

Gradius Galaxies, released in Europe as Gradius Advance and in Japan as Gradius Generation (Note: Japanese: グラディウスジェネレーション, Hepburn: Guradiusu Jenerēshon), is a 2001 horizontally scrolling shooter video game developed by Mobile21 and published by Konami for the Game Boy Advance. It was originally released in Europe in November 2001, North America the same month and Japan in January 2002. It is part of the Gradius series. The game's plot is set between Gradius III and Gradius Gaiden. Bacterion was developing a powerful weapon to use against the planet Gradius, but it was destroyed. A few years later it crashed on a planet and the planet gradually changed into a mechanical fortress. The planet Gradius then sent the Vic Viper to stop it.

== Gameplay ==
The game play is almost identical to other titles in the series. The player takes control of the Vic Viper spacecraft tasked with destroying hordes of enemies. Various traditional elements of Gradius are present — the moai, an undefended final boss, and the upgrade power meter. The weapons system remained mostly unchanged as the configurations available are identical to Gradius III, with the exception that the edit mode is missing. There are four different types of weapons configurations: Balanced, (traditional Gradius) wide area (Salamander) power, and air-to-ground. Each configuration is indicated by the color of Vic Viper. Unlike Gradius III, there are only two shield options — shield and force field. In addition, the S. option ("snake option") is not present in this version; the player can however choose to have the computer assign weapon power-ups automatically or purchase upgrades manually.

The game's configuration allows the player to choose between three difficulty modes, with each mode consisting of three loops — progressively more difficult play-throughs that are unlocked as previous loops are cleared. The Japanese version further included a challenge game play mode that had to be unlocked by achieving a high score during a single play-through of the game's normal difficulty mode. Additional challenges could then by unlocked by completing other challenges. The challenge mode was absent from the U.S. and European releases due to the game being released in Japan several months later.

== Reception ==
Reception

Aggregate score
| Aggregator | Score |
|---|---|
| Metacritic | 78/100 |

Review scores
| Publication | Score |
|---|---|
| AllGame | 3.5/5 |
| Famitsu | 32/40 |
| Game Informer | 7.25/10 |
| GameSpot | 7.8/10 |
| GameSpy | 71% |
| IGN | 7.5/10 |
| Jeuxvideo.com | 14/20 |
| Nintendo Power | 3.5/5 |
| Nintendo World Report | 9/10 |

The game received "generally favorable reviews" according to the review aggregation website Metacritic. Nintendo World Report praised the game's awesomeness and said that "it could even be considered the GBA's Ikaruga." IGN praised the game's ability to save high scores directly to cartridge. In Japan, Famitsu gave it a score of 32 out of 40. GamePro said, "The control is sharp but depends greatly on how many speed-up upgrades you've acquired. The crisp graphics hold up fine on the small screen, but the music is standard, forgettable fare. However, Gradius Galaxies should more than satisfy your inner twitch gamer." (Note: GamePro gave the game three 4/5 scores for graphics, control, and fun factor, and 3/5 for sound.)
