= Gradius Deluxe Pack =

1996 video game compilation

- Saturn box art
- Developer: Konami
- Publisher: Konami
- Composer: Akira Yamaoka
- Series: Gradius
- Platforms: Sega Saturn, PlayStation, Windows
- Release: Saturn, PlayStation: JP: March 29, 1996; Windows: JP: February 21, 1997
- Genre: Shooter
- Mode: Single-player

Gradius Deluxe Pack (Note: Japanese: グラディウス デラックスパック, Hepburn: Guradiusu Derakkusu Pakku) is a 1996 video game compilation developed and published by Konami. It was originally released for the Sega Saturn and PlayStation, and later for Windows computers a year later. It includes the first two games in the company's Gradius series of shoot'em ups — Gradius (1985) and Gradius II (1988) — alongside extras such as CG movies and minor changes to the included titles.

== Gameplay ==
The game is a side-scrolling shooter set on the fictional planet Gradius, which is being attacked by the Bacterians.

== Development and release ==
Gradius Deluxe Pack was released in Japan for the Sega Saturn and PlayStation on March 29, 1996.

== Reception ==
Reception

Review scores
Publication	Score
Famitsu	6/10, 7/10, 6/10, 6/10 (SAT); 7/10, 6/10, 7/10, 5/10 (PS)
MegaFun	76% (SAT)
Sega Saturn Magazine	7.66/10 (SAT)
