= Salamander (video game) =

1986 video game

- Arcade flyer
- Developer: Konami
- Publishers: WW: Konami; JP: Sharp (X68000); EU: Imagine Software (home computers)
- Programmer: Hiroyasu Machiguchi
- Composers: Miki Higashino; Hidenori Maezawa; Shinya Sakamoto; Satoe Terashima; Atsushi Fujio
- Series: Gradius
- Platforms: Arcade, Amstrad CPC, Commodore 64, NES, mobile phone, MSX, PC Engine, X68000, ZX Spectrum
- Release: July 1986: Arcade; JP: July 1986; NA: November 1986; EU: 1986; JP: 1987 (as Life Force) NES; JP: September 25, 1987; NA: August 1988; EU: November 22, 1989 MSX; JP: December 1987; EU: 1987 X68000; JP: October 1988 Amstrad CPC; EU: 1988 ZX Spectrum; EU: 1988 C64; EU: 1988; NA: 1989 PC Engine; JP: December 6, 1991 Mobile Phone S! Appli; JP: August 18, 2003 iOS; WW: December 20, 2010
- Genre: Scrolling shooter
- Modes: Single-player, multiplayer
- Arcade system: Konami GX400

Salamander (Note: Japanese: 沙羅曼蛇(サラマンダ), Hepburn: Saramanda), released as Life Force (Note: Japanese: ライフフォース, Hepburn: Raifu Fōsu) in North America and in the Japanese arcade re-release, is a 1986 scrolling shooter video game developed and published by Konami for arcades. A spin-off of the Gradius series, Salamander introduced a simplified power-up system, two-player cooperative gameplay and both horizontally and vertically scrolling stages. Some of these later became normal for future Gradius games. In Japanese, the title is written using ateji, which are kanji used for spelling foreign words that has been supplanted in everyday use by katakana. Contra, another game by Konami was also given this treatment, with its title written in Japanese as 魂斗羅 (kontora).

Salamander was followed with a sequel in 1996 titled Salamander 2, with M2 developing another sequel, Salamander III, for Konami's Gradius Origins collection on August 7, 2025.

== Gameplay ==
The first player controls Vic Viper and the second player takes the reins of debuting spacecraft Lord British, which is sometimes referred to as "Road British" due to the ambiguity of Japanese-to-English romanization. The game features six stages which alter between horizontal and vertical scrolling.

Players are allowed to continue from where they leave upon death instead of being returned to a predefined checkpoint as per Gradius tradition. There are no continues in single player mode, and two in the two-player mode. The number of continues can be changed through DIP switches. The player gains power-ups by picking up capsules left behind by certain enemies, as opposed to the selection bar used in other Gradius games. However, the Japanese version of Life Force keeps the selection bar.

Many of the power-ups can be combined. For example, an option fires a second (or third) salvo of missiles or ripple/plutonic lasers if these power-ups have been attained. The ripple and laser, however, are mutually exclusive. The only power-up that can survive the ship's destruction is the options (called "multiples" in the English release), they followed the exact flight path of the player's ship and fired when they did, but were otherwise invulnerable. Upon the ship's destruction, the options float in space for a brief time before disappearing; the new ship can grab and retain them.

== Development ==
The arcade version of the game was released under its original title in Japan and Europe, and as Life Force in North America. The Japanese and European versions are nearly identical, but the American version changes the game's plot by adding an opening text that establishes the game to be set inside a giant alien life-form which is infected by a strain of bacteria. Stages that feature starfield backgrounds were changed to the web background from Stage 1 to maintain consistency with the organic setting of the plot. The power-ups are also given different names, with the "Speed-Up" becoming "Hyper Speed", the "Missile" becoming the "Destruct Missile", the "Ripple Laser" becoming the "Pulse Laser" and "Force Field" becoming the "Shield". Narration is added to the beginning of each stage, detailing the area of the alien's body which the player is currently inhabiting such as "Enter stomach muscle zone" or "Bio-mechanical brain attack".

Konami later released an enhanced version of Salamander in Japan in 1987 bearing the American title of Life Force which further fleshes out the organic motif. All of the backgrounds and mechanical enemies are completely redrawn and given organic appearances. The power-up system was also modified, with the Japanese Life Force using the same power-up gauge as the original Gradius. Some music tracks have been completely changed for this release and the power-up gauge is arranged differently for both players.

== Ports ==
Ocean Software, on their Imagine label, released licensed versions of Salamander for computer systems by Spectrum, Commodore and Amstrad in 1988. The Spectrum and Amstrad versions were generally criticized, but the Commodore 64 version was highly praised by the critics of the day, particularly Zzap!64. Though missing two of the six stages, the simultaneous two player mode and gameplay being much easier than its arcade counterpart, the Commodore port is generally considered to be one of the best arcade conversions on this system.

Salamander was ported to the Family Computer in Japan in 1987. Instead of being a direct port of Salamander, elements were taken from the original Salamander and the Japanese Life Force re-release, and some elements, such as levels and bosses, were removed to make way for new content. Most of the background graphics and enemy sprites from Salamander are used in favor of those used in Life Force, though the Gradius-style power bar is used in place of the original instant pick-up system. In 1988, North America received a port as well for the Nintendo Entertainment System. The NES version is practically identical to its Famicom equivalent, other than not having the multiple endings, having two option power ups instead of three, and being titled Life Force. The North America version was later re-released for the Virtual Console on February 16, 2009 for the Wii, on January 23, 2014 for the Nintendo 3DS and August 21, 2014 for the Wii U. The European version is titled Life Force: Salamander on its cover and was released on November 22, 1989. The NES version makes use of the Konami Code, which increases the number of lives from three to 30. The first two levels of Life Force were profiled in the second issue of Nintendo Power, issued in 1988. Several issues later the entire game was re-profiled.

The MSX port of Salamander (沙羅曼蛇, Saramanda) is significantly different from the original and any other ports. New to this port is a graphical introduction that introduces human pilots for each ship, as well as names for each stage. The levels are notably longer than the arcade original, and the player is forced to start from a pre-defined checkpoint upon death of either pilot, instead of starting where he left off. After level two, the player can choose the order of the next three stages. In addition, the player can collect "E" capsules by destroying certain enemies. Collecting fifteen will permanently upgrade one of the available weapons on the power-up bar. Some weapons allow the player ships to merge, one player controlling movements and the second player controlling weapons. Instead of the Vic Viper and the Lord British Space Destroyer, the ships are known as the Sabel Tiger and the Thrasher; piloted by human characters named Iggy Rock and Zowie Scott. The story takes place in the year 6709 A.D and has 2 different endings. The MSX version was re-released for the Wii's Virtual Console in Japan on January 12, 2010. It was later released for the Wii U's Virtual Console on July 20, 2016. They were also made available for the Project EGG on Windows Store on May 19, 2015.

A version for the PC Engine was released on December 6, 1991. Based on the arcade version of Salamander, changes on this port include starting from a pre-defined checkpoint upon death in 1 Player mode, faster enemy animations, and improved music. In Japan, the PC Engine version was re-released for the Wii's Virtual Console on September 11, 2007, for PlayStation Network on July 21, 2010 and for the Wii U's Virtual Console on October 22, 2014, and also for the Project EGG con Windows Store on March 3, 2014. It was released in North America on November 16, 2017 for the Wii U's Virtual Console. The PC version is on the TurboGrafx-16 Mini released in 2020 and is the sole title from the compilation that is excluded from the Japanese model while being included in the North American and European ones.

=== Re-releases ===
A compilation titled Salamander Deluxe Pack Plus was released in Japan for the Sega Saturn on June 19, 1997, and for the PlayStation on July 6 of the same year. The compilation includes Salamander, the Japanese version of Life Force, and Salamander 2. Konami announced that the PlayStation version would be released in the U.S. as part of a bundle with Gradius Gaiden, but this release was later cancelled.

Salamander was released for mobile phones in 2003.

Another compilation of the Salamander series, titled Salamander Portable, was released for the PlayStation Portable on January 24, 2007 in Japan. The PSP compilation features all three games previously included in the Salamander Deluxe Pack Plus, as well as Xexex and the MSX version of Gradius 2 (a.k.a. Nemesis II, which is unrelated to the arcade game Gradius II: Gofer's Ambition).

On December 20, 2010, an application called PC Engine Game Box was published in the App Store which served as a portal to download classic PC Engine video games. Among the downloadable titles is the PC Engine version of Salamander for a fee.

Hamster Corporation released the game as part of their Arcade Archives series for the PlayStation 4 in 2015 and Nintendo Switch in 2020.

The arcade version is included on Konami's Arcade Classics Anniversary Collection released in April 2019 in digital-only format for the PlayStation 4, Xbox One, Nintendo Switch and PC. Initially, the compilation in Japan only had the Salamander version of the game, while everywhere else featured the American Life Force instead. In June 2019, Konami added for free the Japanese versions of the respective games on the western Arcade Classics Anniversary Collection. Only the Salamander version can be played in this addition, as the Japanese Life Force is not part of the compilation. Conversely, the American version of Life Force was added to the collection in Japan in that same update.

== Reception ==
Reception (ports)

Review scores
Publication	Score			
Publication	C64	NES	PC	ZX
ACE				881
AllGame		3.5/5		
Crash				79%
Computer and Video Games	93%		65% (CPC)	65%
Sinclair User				8/10
The Games Machine (UK)	66%			52%
Your Sinclair				8/10; 4/10

In Japan, Game Machine listed Salamander on their August 15, 1986 issue as being the second most successful table arcade unit of the month. It went on to be the top-grossing arcade game on Japan's Gamest charts between September and October 1986.

In 1997, Electronic Gaming Monthly rated the NES version the 76th best console video game of all time, calling it "one of the coolest shooters ever, and ... one of the first big two-player simultaneous shooters on the NES." They particularly noted that the graphics in the fire stage were "mind-blowing back in the day". In 1993, Commodore Force ranked the game at number 19 on its list of the top 100 Commodore 64 games.

== Anime ==
Volume 1 cover

Salamander (沙羅曼蛇, Saramanda) is a 1988 OVA miniseries by Studio Pierrot, directed by Hisayuki Toriumi. There were three episodes released on VHS and Laserdisc between February 25, 1988 and February 21, 1989. The series was licensed by a British company Western Connection. The series is not canon, however; as the MSX Gradius series states that the events with Gofer take place over a two-hundred year period following the crisis with Zelos and his Salamander Armada. In this miniseries, it is revealed that the Bacterians capture sentient life to create leaders for their space armada. They capture sentient life via a dark fog going through space that changes inorganic matter into organic matter (the large brain-like final bosses in the games); and that they are a crystal-like life-form in origin. Noriko Hidaka provided the voice of the protagonist Stephanie. In the anime, the Lord British Space Destroyer was named after one of the protagonists, Ike Lord British of planet Latis; thus making it Lord British's Space Destroyer.

Releases

- Vol. 1: Salamander (沙羅曼蛇, Saramanda) (based on Salamander)
- Vol. 2: Salamander: Meditating Paula (沙羅曼蛇 瞑想のパオラ, Saramanda Meisō no Paora) (based on Gradius)
- Vol. 3: Salamander: Gofer's Ambition (沙羅曼蛇 ゴーファーの野望, Saramanda Gōfā no Yabō) (based on Gradius II)

== Bibliography ==
- Gradius Portable Official Guide. Konami. 2006. ISBN 4-86155-111-0.
