= Moai-kun =

1990 video game

- Japanese box art
- Developer: Konami
- Publisher: Konami
- Designers: Setsu Muraki; Shigeharu Umezaki
- Composer: Harumi Ueko
- Platform: Family Computer
- Release: JP: March 9, 1990
- Genre: Puzzle
- Mode: Single-player

Moai-kun (モアイくん, Moai Kid) is a puzzle video game developed and published by Konami for the Family Computer in Japan in March 1990, and a spin-off of the Gradius video game series. The game derives its themes from Easter Island; the player controls a sentient moai statue (which is an enemy in the Gradius series) that must rescue other moai and escape each stage via a door before the timer expires. Although platforming elements are present, the primary challenge is to find a way to manipulate the objects in each stage to reach the distressed moai and rescue them while still leaving an avenue of escape to the exit door.

== Gameplay ==
Each stage is a single screen with a variety of platforms, enemies, and obstacles. The protagonist moai has limited jumping abilities, but may also smash certain blocks and enemies using a head-butt, or drop bombs found in certain stages to destroy blocks below him.

Although some stages will test the player's platforming abilities by requiring careful jumps, most will instead require careful planning of each move via moving or destroying blocks, and not only its immediate consequences but the long-term effects as well. For example, a block pushed against another object can no longer be moved, which may ultimately prevent the final solution of the puzzle.

Typically each stage has only a single solution (or several very similar solutions), and an incorrect move risks making the stage impossible to solve from that point forward. The player may reset the stage by pressing select at any time, though doing so costs the player one life. Successfully completing a stage awards the player one extra life. In addition to voluntarily resetting the stage, the player may lose a life by touching an enemy, falling into a pit, landing on hazards, being crushed by falling objects, or running out of time.

The game features 56 unique stages, and allows the player to continue the game via use of a password.

The graphics and themes are largely derived from Easter Island imagery, with many backgrounds taking cues from island landscapes and objects and enemies frequently resembling primitive stones or statues. Fantasy elements are present, with many stages taking place in the clouds and enemies using magic.

== Release and reception ==
Moai-kun was released in March 1990 in Japan for the Family Computer system. Although it never received a North American or PAL release, virtually all of the game's text is in English, with only the title screen graphic in Japanese. It received generally favorable reviews on release, with reviewers praising the brain-teaser variant on platforming.
