= Xexex =

1991 video game

- Japanese arcade flyer
- Developer: Konami
- Publisher: Konami
- Director: Toshiaki Takatori
- Programmers: Tatsuo Fujii; Tetsuya Wada
- Artists: Chiyoko Hanano; Kuniaki Kakuwa; M. Machiguchi
- Composers: Hidenori Maezawa; Motoaki Furukawa; Satoko Miyawaki; Ayako Nishigaki
- Platform: Arcade
- Release: JP: October 1991; EU: 1991; NA: 1991
- Genre: Scrolling shooter
- Modes: Single-player, multiplayer

Xexex (Note: Japanese: ゼクセクス, Hepburn: Zekusekusu), released as Orius in North America, is a 1991 horizontally scrolling shooter video game developed and published by Konami for arcades. It was released in Japan in October 1991 and the same year internationally. It draws on Irem's R-Type and Konami's other shoot 'em up Gradius, while adding the tentacle mechanics of Irem's other shoot 'em up X Multiply. In the game, players take control of the Flintlock space fighter (which is armed with the mysterious alien life form "Flint") in a mission to rescue Princess Irene La Tias of Planet E-Square, who has been captured by the evil galactic warlord Klaus Pachelbel.

It did not see a home port until 2007, when it was included in the compilation Salamander Portable, released only in Japan for the PlayStation Portable. Hamster Corporation released the game as part of their Arcade Archives series for the Nintendo Switch and PlayStation 4 in December 2021.

== Gameplay ==
Arcade version screenshot

The gameplay is similar to R-Type and X-Multiply. The player's ship, the Flintlock, has a detachable orb attachment called the Flint, which behaves similar to R-Type's Force Device. Power-ups can be obtained to increase the Flint's tentacles, movement speed, change the main weapon, or even give the player an extra life or energy.

There are different gameplay mechanics between the original Japanese release and the overseas releases. The overseas versions introduce a variety of changes, with the most notable being the removal of all but one upgradable weapon, as well as the removal of a lives system, which is replaced with an energy bar. The enemy patterns are also changed slightly and the bosses have more health.

- In the Japanese version, the player starts with the Proton Laser, a thin stream of weak bullets. Defeating certain enemies will drop other weapons. The name of the current weapon is displayed at the bottom of the screen. The game uses a traditional lives system, and when a life is lost, the player continues play from a checkpoint.
- In the overseas versions, the only available weapon is the Proton Laser, with Missiles acting as a secondary weapon; powering up the Proton Laser increases its spread, and powering up the Missiles increases the amount fired. The Flint's tentacles have been shortened in this version, and it now can only be shot forward and released instead of being able to be detached near the ship. This version opts for an energy bar instead of lives, and the Flintlock can take multiple hits before being destroyed. If the ship's energy reaches zero, the player must insert another credit, and then can begin immediately where they left off with a newly restored energy bar.

== Reception ==
Reception

Review scores
Publication	Score
Computer and Video Games	(Arcade) 72%
Gamest	(Arcade) 39/50
Game Zone	(Arcade) 3.5/5
Zero	(Arcade) 4/5

Award
Publication	Award
Gamest Mook (1998)	Grand Prize 3rd, Best Shooting Award 2nd, Best Performance Award 6th, Best Graphic Award 1st, Best VGM Award 1st, Popular Player 9th, Annual Hit Game 10th (Arcade)

In Japan, Game Machine listed Xexex on their November 15, 1991 issue as being the fifth most-popular arcade game at the time. In the January 1992 issue of Japanese publication Micom BASIC Magazine, the game was ranked on the number ten spot in popularity. At the 1992 Gamest Awards, Xexex was awarded Best Graphics (beating Virtua Racing) and Best VGM (beating Metal Black). Xexex was also nominated for Game of the Year (ranked 4th), Best Shooter (ranked 2nd), and Best Direction (ranked 6th), but lost to Street Fighter II: Champion Edition, Aero Fighters, and Art of Fighting, respectively.

Xexex has been met with positive reception from critics since its initial launch.

Konami released four Yu-Gi-Oh! Trading Card Game cards as a reference to Xexex: Flint, Flint Lock, Flint Attack (Flint Missile) and King of Destruction Xexex.
