= Cosmic Wars =

1989 video game

- Developer: Konami
- Publisher: Konami
- Composers: Hidenori Maezawa, Harumi Ueko
- Platform: Family Computer
- Release: JP: 4 August 1989; i-Revo: JP: 15 September 2006
- Genre: Turn-based strategy
- Modes: Single-player, multiplayer

Cosmic Wars (コズミックウォーズ, Kozumikku Wōzu) is a turn-based strategy video game for the Family Computer produced by Konami in 1989 which is based upon the characters and conflicts of the popular Gradius series. It was released only in Japan. The game received a sequel in 1997, with Paro Wars, which is the Parodius equivalent of this game.

The object of Cosmic Wars is to use an army composed of Gradius characters (Vic Vipers, and Big Cores) and battle enemies in various star systems. The player can be either the Bacterion Empire or the forces of Gradius. There are many different unit types, ranging from small fighters to large capital ships.
