= Solar Assault =

1997 video game

- Developer: Konami
- Publisher: Konami
- Series: Gradius
- Platform: Arcade
- Release: JP: July 1997
- Genre: Rail shooter
- Mode: Single-player

Solar Assault (Note: Japanese: ソーラーアサルト, Hepburn: Sōrā Asaruto) is a three-dimensional shoot 'em up released by Konami in 1997. A spin-off of the long running Gradius series, the title retains most of the gameplay characteristics of its 2D counterparts including the same powerups and display system.

== Gameplay ==
The player's ship, the Lord British, exchanging shots with enemy targets. To the bottom is the weapon meter, to the top is the score.

Solar Assault is similar to other rail-shooters like Star Fox and Galaxy Force, where the player must move both horizontally and vertically. Like the other games in the Gradius series, there is no health bar, meaning one hit ends up in death; however, this time the player may be able to collect a "shield" power up which can take one hit or two hits before the ship's destruction. The other major gameplay change is the ability to adjust the speed, which is necessary to time the avoidance of certain obstacles and enemies. There are three ships to choose from: the Vic Viper, Lord British and Alphinia.

== Release ==
Solar Assault Revised is an updated version of Solar Assault released later in 1997, and introduced a new arcade board that was co-developed by Konami and IBM which allows five boards to be stacked on top of each other, as well as several modifications to the game, like the all-new level "Fierce Blaze", new attacks to the "Speed Demon" level boss and a total revamp on the "Abyssal Forest" level, with a new color palette and some new enemies, making it much harder than the original. The US version of the game was based on this one, just simply renamed as "Solar Assault".
