= Gradius: The Interstellar Assault =

1991 video game

- Japanese cover art
- Developer: Konami
- Publisher: Konami
- Designers: Y. Daikai; Hiroyuki Fukui; Tamotsu Goto
- Composer: Yoshiyuki Hagiwara
- Series: Gradius
- Platform: Game Boy
- Release: JP: August 9, 1991; NA: January 1992; EU: 1992
- Genre: Scrolling shooter
- Mode: Single-player

Gradius: The Interstellar Assault, released as Nemesis II: The Return of the Hero in Europe, and Nemesis II (Note: Japanese: ネメシスII, Hepburn: Nemeshisu II) in Japan, is a 1991 horizontally scrolling shooter video game developed and published by Konami for the Game Boy. It is the second game in the Gradius series released for the console. The game was re-released via the Konami GB Collection series of Super Game Boy and Game Boy Color compilations; it can be found in the Japanese Vol.3 and the European Vol.4. Like Gradius before it, these versions were renamed Gradius II for the Japanese Vol.3 and Gradius II: The Return of the Hero for the European Vol.4. It was re-released on the Nintendo Classics service for the Nintendo Switch in May 2025.

== Gameplay ==
Gradius: The Interstellar Assault retains the traditional horizontal scrolling gameplay from the Gradius series. Once again the player takes control of the Vic Viper and flies through five different stages destroying Bacterion's army.

The game retains the traditional power-up bar from the original Gradius. The player can speed-up multiple times, use missiles, shoot double firepower or lasers, use several options at a time and use the classic shield (although it is referred to as a forcefield). However, before each game is started or continued, the player is given a "Weapon Select" screen. Here the player can choose between one of three settings for the missiles, double firepower, and lasers.

== Reception ==
James Beaven gave the game a 90% in GamesMaster, commenting, "Forget the R-Type games. This is the shoot-em-up to end 'em all! The bad guys don't leave you alone for a second, and the six-strong assortment of power ups, well, 'Way-hey', as Eric Morecambe used to say."

French magazine Joypad gave the game a 92%, saying that it "doesn't let you breathe for a second, the enemies come from all sides, and they're multiform. Regularly, you face a colossal monster that nearly takes up the entire screen."
