= Gradius IV =

1999 video game

- Japanese arcade flyer
- Developer: Konami
- Publisher: Konami
- Director: Akinari Takaki
- Producer: Michihiro Ishizuka
- Designers: Yasunori Kanetake; Noriaki Yamamoto
- Composer: Atsuki Watanabe
- Series: Gradius
- Platform: Arcade
- Release: WW: February 4, 1999
- Genre: Scrolling shooter
- Modes: Single-player, multiplayer
- Arcade system: Konami Hornet

Gradius IV (known as Gradius IV: Fukkatsu (Note: Japanese: グラディウスIV:復活, Hepburn: Gradiusu Fō: Fukkatsu; Gradius IV: Resurrection) in Japan) is the fourth arcade installment in a series of scrolling shooter video games developed by Konami Computer Entertainment Tokyo. Released in 1999, it was preceded by Gradius III, although spinoffs had been released prior to it such as Gradius Gaiden. This title brings a considerable graphical upgrade, particularly with the use of colored lighting. In addition, there have been several additions and removals to the vaulted weapons system; specifically, the edit mode has been removed and an online ranking system was added.

== Gameplay ==
The player's ship, the Vic Viper, exchanging shots with golden dragon enemies in the first stage

The core gameplay of Gradius IV remains relatively unchanged. However, several changes were made on the weapons system in the transition from Gradius III. First of all, the edit mode has been completely eliminated, as are the "Snake Option" (s.option), the "Reduce" shield type, and the seventh powerup category. The seventh powerup category was the one that was labeled "!" and would produce detrimental results, such as reducing the speed or eliminating the weapons of the ship.

In this game there are a total of six configurations, the first four of which are migrated from Gradius II. The two new configurations are as follows:

- Configuration 5: The missile mode is a vertical mine that is released above and below the ship. After a short delay, the mines explode, yielding a large explosion. The double mode is the standard 45-degree angle split. The laser mode is a thin armor-piercing round that can penetrate multiple enemies.
- Configuration 6: The missile mode is the flying torpedo, which produces two missiles that fly forward in front of the ship. The double mode is the tailgun, seen in other configurations. The laser is the twin laser seen in Gradius III.

== Development and release ==
Gradius IV was the creation of Konami designers Ashida Hiroyuki, known for his work on Gradius II and Detana!! TwinBee, and Yoro Daisuke, who assisted with production of Bishi Bashi Champion. Daisuke felt that the game was his first "important" video game project as it was the first video game he was involved in from the start of production, which he claims made development a difficult endeavor. The team often drew their ideas on a whiteboard, which was used as a reference during work. Development was pressured as the team wanted to make a Gradius game worthy of having the name "IV"; Yoro recalls that the production staff felt indifferent with many of its mechanics, with some having pride in them and others wishing they had been done differently. Ashida joined the project as director, which was met with a somewhat negative reaction from employees working on it.

Several stage ideas in Gradius IV were scrapped as the team could not decide on how they would work, such as this "puzzle stage" concept where the player shot reflective spheres to open up passageways.

One of the team's biggest ideas was the stage designs, as they wanted them to feel fresh and new, as well as being distinct from previous Gradius titles. The project's theme was "interactive", signaling that levels should be engaging and react based on the player's movement and actions. As the first game in the series to use 3D graphics, the team focused to make stages take advantage of this. The first stage, featuring large, reflective metal planetoids, was a sort-of homage to Gradius II and its first level, which had fire-coated planets with large dragon-like enemies bursting out of them. Some stage ideas, like the "volcano" theme in the fourth level, were incorporated from other Gradius games, with the majority being original ideas. A "boss rush" segment was added as the idea was popular among other Konami staff. Several stage ideas were cut from the final game as the team had disagreements over how they would function, most notably a puzzle-like stage where the player shot reflective spheres to open up passageways.

Development of Gradius IV lasted for roughly ten months — midway through development it was put on hold while staff was shuffled. The subtitle "Fukkatsu", translating to "Resurrection" or "Revival", was added to represent three different ideas: the revival of Gradius series antagonist GOFER, the revival of arcade games in general, and the revival of more "stoic" shooting games, as the staff was displeased with how the shooter genre was mainly relegated to bullet-hell, "daimaku" games for more hardcore fans. The player's ship, the Vic Viper, was redesigned several times as the staff was unhappy with how most of the revisions turned out. The final design was made to emphasize the ship's "sharpness", since it was redesigned for a 3D video game. The "edit mode" from Gradius III was cut from IV as the team felt it made the game unbalanced.

Gradius IV was presented to the public at the 39th JAMMA tradeshow in Japan in November 1998, shown alongside Konami's own Evil Night. It was officially released on February 4, 1999, running on the Konami Hornet arcade system. To help promote the game, Konami hosted an online-ranking tournament: once a player's game was over a password was presented, which could be uploaded to the company's website for a chance to win prizes up until August 27, 1999.

== Reception ==
In Japan, Game Machine listed Gradius IV as the second most successful arcade game of March 1999.

Home versions of Gradius IV were mostly positive. In their review for Gradius III & IV, IGN called its graphics colorful and its backgrounds detailed, although said it was "still a bit behind the curve back then". Gamers' Republic agreed, going further to say that the PlayStation 2 port was superior than the arcade version through its vibrant backgrounds, fast-paced gameplay and impressive boss fights. Retro Gamer magazine was much more negative towards the game in their 2007 retrospective, saying that its ugly graphics and "hideously" unfair stage designs made Gradius IV an "utter catastrophe of a game". They stated the PlayStation 2 conversion was slightly improved thanks to its save-state feature, but that overall it was a major disappointment compared to previous Gradius game.

In a 2017 retrospective coverage of the Gradius series, Hardcore Gaming 101 said that IV felt more like a "best-of" remake of the first four games instead of a full-new game, disliking its graphics for being poor and its mechanics for sometimes being unfinished and not well-implemented. They also said that the game was more of a step back compared to the critically acclaimed Gradius Gaiden for not using many of its ideas and features that proved to fix and improve upon the core Gradius gameplay, writing: "Since it feels like such a redux, with very little added to the formula and almost nothing carried over from Gaiden, Gradius IV just seems redundant. It's not terrible, but it's really only worth investigating for hardcore fans and completionists."
