= Mobile21 =

Japanese video game developer

Mobile21 Co., Ltd.
- Native name: モバイル２１株式会社
- Romanized name: Mobairu21 kabushiki gaisha
- Company type: Joint venture
- Industry: Video game
- Founded: October 7, 1999
- Defunct: December 14, 2002
- Fate: Defunct
- Headquarters: Asakusabashi, Tokyo, Japan
- Key people: Masaki Yoneoka (president)
- Owners: Nintendo (50%); Konami (50%)

Mobile21 Co., Ltd. (Note: Japanese: モバイル２１株式会社, Hepburn: Mobairu21 kabushiki gaisha) was a Japanese video game developer that was a 50/50 joint venture between Nintendo and Konami established in October 1999. Mobile21 primarily concentrated on creating Game Boy Advance games, with a particular focus utilizing the mobile phone linking features of the Mobile Adapter GB accessory. The company was led by Masaki Yoneoka and its headquarters were located within Nintendo's offices in the Asakusabashi district of Tokyo.

== History ==
On September 2, 1999, Nintendo and Konami announced the establishment of Mobile21, a joint venture focused on developing software for Nintendo consoles with network connectivity. As part of this initiative, Nintendo planned to release an adapter the following year to connect the Game Boy Color and Game Boy Advance to cell phones, enabling online interactions. The company also had plans to develop software for the future GameCube console. Each company invested ¥150 million in the joint venture.

Operations began on October 7, 1999, with an initial capital of ¥200 million, evenly split between Nintendo and Konami. However, each company retained only 15% of the stock, leaving 70% available to grant to employees in anticipation of an early public offering, part of an aggressive talent recruitment strategy.

The Mobile Adapter GB and the Mobile System GB service were unveiled at the Nintendo Space World event in August 2000. At the time, Nintendo planned to release them in December, however, delays establishing the service pushed the launch back to January 27, 2001, for a MSRP of ¥5,800.

The Mobile Adapter GB was not a commercial success, selling 80,000 units in its first year on the market, leading the Mobile System GB service to be discontinued after less than two years on December 14, 2002. The end of the Mobile Adapter GB also led to the end of Mobile21.

== Games ==
Mobile21 produced twelve games during its time in existence, six of which used the Mobile Adapter GB.

Name	Release date	Publisher	Platform	Notes
Monster Guardians	March 21, 2001	Konami	GBA	Mobile Adapter GB support
Tanbi Musou: Meine Liebe	April 26, 2001	Konami	GBA	
Doraemon: Midori no Wakusei Doki Doki Daikyūshutsu!	April 27, 2001	Epoch	GBA	Mobile Adapter GB support
Net de Get Minigames @100	July 12, 2001	Konami	GBC	Mobile Adapter GB support
EX Monopoly	July 13, 2001	Takara	GBA	Mobile Adapter GB support
Mobile Pro Yakyū: Kantoku no Saihai	July 26, 2001	Konami	GBA	Mobile Adapter GB support
Jurassic Park III: Island Attack	August 30, 2001	Konami	GBA	
Okuman Chouja Game: Nottori Daisakusen!	November 30, 2001	Takara	GBA	
Gradius Galaxies	January 17, 2002	Konami	GBA	
Mail de Cute	February 14, 2002	Konami	GBA	Mobile Adapter GB support
Koro Koro Puzzle Happy Panechu!	March 8, 2002	Nintendo	GBA	
AirForce Delta Storm	September 16, 2002	Konami	GBA	
