= Paro Wars =

1997 video game

- Developer: Konami Computer Entertainment Tokyo
- Publisher: Konami
- Designers: Noritoshi Kodama, Akie Karibe (Package); Yumenosuke Tokuda (Visual); Noritoshi Kodama, Chieko Mukaiyama, Kosue Kamito, Yoko Suzuki (Graphic); Seiya Murai (Sound)
- Composers: Tomomi Ota, Seiya Murai, Kosuke Soeda
- Series: Parodius
- Platform: PlayStation
- Release: JP: September 25, 1997; JP: December 9, 1999 (Konami the Best)
- Genre: Turn-based strategy
- Modes: Single-player, multiplayer

Paro Wars (Note: Japanese: パロウォーズ, Hepburn: Parowōzu) is a turn-based strategy video game produced by Konami in September 1997 in Japan only (with the re-release as a Konami the Best title in December 1999). It features characters and conflicts based upon the popular Parodius series of video games which in turn is a parody of the long running Gradius series. It is the last installment of the Parodius series and is the Parodius equivalent to Cosmic Wars, a turn-based strategy game set in the Gradius universe, or R-Type Tactics, set in the R-Type universe.

== Plot ==
The "Second Great World War Parodius" that led the world into a fit of laughter ended more than 50 years ago. Three military organizations: "The Alliance Penta", "Organization Koitsu and Aitsu" and "Alliance Araji" have kept each other in check secretly, and as a result, peace is maintained through this delicate balance. However, this stability begins to crumble when a mysterious cat named John Myan Jiro begins to interfere in these relationships. The three organisations are then needed to win the "Third Great War of the World Parodius" for peace and honor of their respective countries.

== Gameplay ==
The object of Paro Wars is to utilize an army composed of Parodius characters (penguins, octopuses, etc.) and battle enemies on various 3D-rendered battlefields. There are many different unit types, ranging from troops, to planes, to tank-like vehicles. A single scenario may take multiple hours to complete.

== Release ==
Paro Wars was released in 1997 in Japan. It was the final entry in the series.

== Board Game ==
- A Board Game based on the video game Paro Wars was Developed by Konami on February 11, 1998, in Japan.
