= Salamander 2 =

1996 video game

- Developer(s): Konami
- Publisher(s): Konami
- Composer(s): Naoki Maeda
- Series: Salamander
- Platform(s): Arcade; PlayStation; Saturn
- Release: JP: January 1996
- Genre(s): Scrolling shooter
- Mode(s): Single-player, multiplayer

Salamander 2 (Note: Japanese: 沙羅曼蛇(サラマンダ)2, Hepburn: Saramanda Tsū) is a 1996 horizontally scrolling shooter arcade video game developed and published in Japan by Konami. It is the direct sequel to Salamander (1986), which itself is a spin-off of the Gradius franchise. Up to two players control two starships — the Vic Viper and the Super Cobra — as they destroy the alien race Doom before they wipe out all of the planet Gradius. Gameplay involves shooting down enemies, collecting power-up items, and avoiding collision with projectiles or obstacles.

Though it was a moderate success in arcades, Salamander 2 was met with mixed reviews. The game received generally negative feedback from fans of the original Salamander for its poor design and inferiority to its predecessor. It has been republished through Salamander Deluxe Pack Plus (1997) and Salamander Portable (2007). These re-releases were better-received for their gameplay, graphical style, and soundtrack, though its high level of difficulty and lack of innovation were the subject of criticism. Its music has since been re-released in various Konami soundtrack albums.

It was followed by a new sequel, Salamander III in 2025, as part of the compilation Gradius Origins, developed by M2.

== Gameplay ==
The player's ship, the Vic Viper, about to destroy a formation of enemies

Salamander 2 is a horizontal-scrolling shooter video game in which players control a starship through six scrolling stages in an attempt to destroy the hostile alien race "Doom" before they wipe out the planet Gradius and the remains of mankind. The first player controls the blue Vic Viper while the second player controls the red Super Cobra. Both ships are tasked with completing each of the game's six scrolling stages; these stages alternate between horizontal and vertical-scrolling planes. In these, players must shoot down constantly-moving formations of enemies while avoiding collisions with them, their projectiles, and moving obstacles such as asteroids and walls. Stages conclude with a fight against a boss that is defeated by destroying its weak point. Completing all six stages allows the player to start back at the beginning, or "loop", to replay the game at a higher difficulty.

By destroying red-colored enemies, players can collect power-up items that enhance their weapons. Both players begin the game with a standard forward-moving shot, and can upgrade these to a laser, a circling "ripple" laser that increases in size, and a twin shot, in addition to a forcefield and an increase in movement speed. Large, brightly-colored orbs known as "Options" can be obtained, providing additional firepower. Players can also collect smaller ones named "Option Seeds", which circle their ship and also assist the player in fighting off enemies. Options can be launched at enemies to create powerful shocks of lightning that home in on nearby targets.

== Development and release ==
Salamander 2 is the arcade sequel to Salamander (1986) and the third installment in the Salamander series, itself a spin-off of Konami's larger Gradius franchise. The game was programmed for the Konami GX Type 2 arcade system board, which was also used for similar shooters like Twinbee Yahho! (1995) and Sexy Parodius (1996). Salamander 2 features a noticeably drastic change in art direction from Konami's other shooters, with darker, more washed-out color choices. Its character designs and artwork were designed by company artist Mariko Tokida. She claims to have had difficulty designing these, particularly the first stage boss and moving asteroid obstacles, due to the enormity of the color palette, the complex sprite animation tools, and varying size limits. The Super Cobra ship is named after an older 1981 Konami arcade game of the same name that is loosely tied to the Gradius series.

Salamander 2's soundtrack was composed by Naoki Maeda, who went on to create various tracks for the Dance Dance Revolution series. Maeda wanted the music to feel reminiscent of the soundtrack for Salamander while feeling fresh and new at the same time. The sound team for Tokimeki Memorial Taisen Puzzle-Dama (1995) assisted him in acquiring the necessary sound production software and toolsets. Maeda claims the game underwent an unusual development cycle. The soundtrack was re-released by King Record in April 1996, and is included in the albums Konami Shooting Collection (2011) and Music from Konami Arcade Shooting (2020).

Konami demonstrated Salamander 2 at the 1995 Japan Amusement Machinery Manufacturers Association (JAMMA) tradeshow in Tokyo as a way to receive feedback from players, having been 30% completed by that point. Electronic Gaming Monthly reported that it received long lines from players at its exhibition. The game was released in Japan in January 1996. In 1997, Salamander 2 was ported to the PlayStation and Sega Saturn through the collection Salamander Deluxe Pack Plus, alongside the original Salamander and Life Force, and to the PlayStation Portable version in 2007 as part of Salamander Portable.

== Reception ==
Reception

Review score
Publication	Score
Edge	6/10

According to Game Machine, a Japanese arcade game publication, Salamander 2 achieved a moderate level of success in arcades. However, the game was criticized by fans of the original Salamander for its inferiority and poor design. Game Criticism found it to be an average scrolling shooter that lacked any innovation, with badly-designed graphics and generic weapons. Electronic Gaming Monthly staff commented on the detailed visuals and fast-paced gameplay, though they expressed disappointment at the lack of any major changes to the standard Salamander and Gradius mechanics. Edge, in contrast, believed its graphics and challenge could help mark the return of more "hardcore" shooter fans into arcades.

Reception towards home releases of Salamander 2 was more positive. Rich Leadbetter of Sega Saturn Magazine, in his review of Salamander Deluxe Pack Plus, enjoyed its gameplay, graphics, and useful weapon pickups, in addition to its many callbacks to the original Salamander and Life Force. GameFan writers agreed; one wrote that it "hearkens back to the glory days" of Konami, and nicely contrasted from the developer's TwinBee and Parodius releases. Edge staff were enamored with the game's detailed visuals and parallax-scrolling backdrops, but believed it suffered from an overly-high difficulty and short length. They wrote that its problems made it a title that "fails to offer the finely tuned balance between success and failure on which the gaming experience depends."

Retrospectively in 2010, Hardcore Gaming 101's Kurt Kalata felt that Salamander 2 lacked the same level of innovation that Konami's other shooters possessed, but said the combination of hand-drawn and pre-rendered sprites gave it a unique look. Kalata was particularly positive towards the game's soundtrack, which he proclaimed was its only noteworthy aspect. Retro Gamer writer Mike Bevan enjoyed its tweaks to the core gameplay of Salamander, as it made the game feel fresh and new. He also liked its level of challenge and its graphical style for featuring an anime-like aesthetic.
