= Gradius ReBirth =

2008 video game

- Developer: M2
- Publisher: Konami
- Director: Masato Misaki
- Programmer: Hiroshi Yoneyama
- Composer: Manabu Namiki
- Series: Gradius
- Platform: WiiWare
- Release: JP: September 2, 2008; NA: March 9, 2009; PAL: July 3, 2009
- Genre: Scrolling shooter
- Mode: Single-player

Gradius ReBirth (Note: Gradius ReBirth (Japanese: グラディウスリバース, Hepburn: Guradiusu Ribāsu)) is a shoot 'em up video game for WiiWare developed by M2 and published by Konami. It's an installment in the Gradius series. It was released in Japan on September 2, 2008, and in North America on March 9, 2009, and in the PAL regions on July 3, 2009.

== Gameplay ==
Gradius ReBirth is a side-scrolling 2D shooter much like previous Gradius games, and has been described as a "remix" of levels from past games rather than an entirely new game. The game features two modes: a standard game with unlimited credits and a Score Attack mode where players are only given a single credit to beat the game. Score Attack also supports online leaderboards. The game features five different types of ships to choose from, and five stages in total, with each (except the first stage) having its own original boss at the end.

== Plot ==
This game takes place in the Gradian Year 6664, two years before "The Silent Nightmare Incident". The planet Antichthon, a protectorate of the Gradian Empire, suddenly and mysteriously falls silent. A report was made by the Director General of the Space Science Agency, Dr. Venom, which mentions that Antichthon's mother computer was now under the control of the Bacterians.

Realizing that a threat from the Bacterians may be imminent, the Gradian Government deploys its Gradian forces to combat the threat. Among them is Special Colonel James Burton, who had defeated the Bacterians a few years ago. Armed with an A.I. program called Gaudie, James Burton sets out in the hyperspace fighter known as the Vic Viper, in the hopes that he can combat the new Bacterian threat. But little does James know that there's much more in store for him...

== Development ==
Gradius ReBirth uses the Nemesis titles for the MSX as its basis. The power meter and text display have also been updated. The music was composed by Manabu Namiki and consists of remixed music from previous Gradius games.

An update to the game was released on the Wii Shop Channel for free of charge. It improves some of the visuals and adds a new ranking board for the adjustments made to the score system. In addition to this, there are new music tracks and a few changes to the game's levels.

== Reception ==
Reception

Aggregate score
Aggregator	Score
Metacritic	69/100

Review scores
Publication	Score
1Up.com	B
Destructoid	7.5/10
GamesMaster	79%
GamesRadar+	4/5
GamesTM	7/10
IGN	7/10
Nintendo Life	6/10
Official Nintendo Magazine	67%
Teletext GameCentral	6/10

Gradius ReBirth received "average" reviews according to the review aggregation website Metacritic. IGN praised the nostalgic retro design but found the game to be punishingly hard for most players and the lack of multiplayer disappointing.

== See also ==
- Castlevania: The Adventure ReBirth
- Contra ReBirth
