= Nemesis 2 (MSX) =

1987 video game

- European cover art
- Developers: Konami; SPS (Kai)
- Publishers: Konami; SPS (Kai)
- Designer: Naoki Matsui
- Composers: Kinuyo Yamashita; Motoaki Furukawa; Masahiro Ikariko
- Series: Gradius
- Platforms: MSX, X68000, PC, PlayStation Portable
- Release: MSX: JP: August 22, 1987; EU: 1987; X68000: JP: November 5, 1993; PC: JP: January 27, 2015
- Genre: Horizontal Scrolling Shooter
- Modes: Single-player multiplayer (alternate)

Nemesis 2, released as Gradius 2 (グラディウス2, Guradiusu Tsū) in Japan, is a side-scrolling shoot 'em up video game released for the MSX computer in 1987 by Konami. The game is a sequel to the MSX conversion of the first Gradius, which was released under the Nemesis title in Europe. It predated the similarly titled arcade sequel Gradius II (which used the Roman numeral 'II' and was distributed in Europe as Vulcan Venture). It was the first Konami cartridge for the MSX to employ their proprietary sound chip the SCC, which adds five extra wave sound channels in addition to the three default channels used by the MSX's standard PSG.

In a departure from other games, instead of controlling Vic Viper, the available ship is called Metalion. Unlike other titles, this game has a heavier focus on story, which is told by cut-scenes. The gameplay is mostly unchanged from the rest of the series, though there are some powerups that temporally gives the ship some enhancements. Also, when the bosses are being defeated, if the Metalion flies where they are, a mini-level can be accessed in order to obtain new permanent upgrades, if the mini levels are successfully cleared.

A remake was released for the X68000 computer under the title of Nemesis '90 Kai (ネメシス'90改, Nemeshisu ninetī kai), with some graphical and aural enhancements.

== Plot ==
The Director General of Space Science Agency Dr. Venom was exiled to Planet Sard for a failed coup d'état. In the year 6665, he escapes and invades Planet Nemesis and the seven planets it controls with the help of Bacterion. The Nemesis High Council sends James Burton, ex-pilot of the Vic Viper, to pilot Metalion and attack Dr. Venom and the Bacterion invaders. The game takes place during the year 6666.

== Nemesis '90 Kai ==
This X68000 port is essentially an enhanced remake of Nemesis 2 with graphical quality on par with Gradius III.
It includes two new stages exclusive to this version of the game, and four new bosses (two of which replace the rematches fought in the MSX version.) Some people still prefer the original for its charm and color scheme.

== Ports ==
Aside from being remade as Nemesis '90 Kai, Nemesis 2 was also ported to Sony PSP in 2007 as part of the Salamander Portable collection.

Gradius 2 was re-released for Wii's Virtual Console in 2009, for Project EGG in 2015, and for Wii U Virtual Console in 2016 in Japan.
