= Konami GB Collection =

Video game compilation series

Konami GB Collection (Note: Japanese: コナミGBコレクション, Hepburn: Konami GB Korekushon) is a series of four video game compilations published by Konami, each comprising four of their previously released Game Boy titles on a single cartridge. The compilations were originally released from 1997 to 1998 in Japan on the Game Boy, and featured Super Game Boy palette and border support, with game descriptions and instructions provided by the girls from the original Tokimeki Memorial. The compilations later received a European release in 2000 for the Game Boy Color, which removed the Super Game Boy support and Tokimeki Memorial content but added colour support.

== Games ==
Despite sharing the same games, the Japan and European releases differ in their order of release after the first volume. Each volume contains four games.

Konami GB Collection entries
JP Title	PAL Title	JP Release date	PAL Release date	Included games
Vol.1	Vol.1	25 September 1997	February 2000	Gradius, Castlevania: The Adventure, Konami Racing, Probotector
Vol.2	Vol.3	11 December 1997	May 2000	Pop n' TwinBee, Mystical Ninja Starring Goemon, Bikers, Guttang Gottong
Vol.3	Vol.4	19 February 1998	July 2000	Gradius II: The Return of the Hero, Castlevania II: Belmont's Revenge, Yie Ar Kung-Fu, Antarctic Adventure
Vol.4	Vol.2	19 March 1998	February 2000	Parodius, Block Game, Track & Field, Frogger

== Reception ==
Tim Jones of IGN scored Vol.1, 3, and 4 an 8/10 each, believing most of the included games held up and remained fun to play. However, Jones only scored Vol.2 a 6/10, believing its lineup of games was not as strong as the other series entries.
