= Gradius V =

2004 video game

- North American cover art by Hidetaka Tenjin
- Developer: Treasure
- Publisher: Konami
- Directors: Hiroshi Iuchi; Atsutomo Nakagawa
- Producer: Yasushi Takano
- Designers: Hiroshi Iuchi; Atsutomo Nakagawa
- Artist: Hidetaka Tenjin
- Composer: Hitoshi Sakimoto
- Series: Gradius
- Platform: PlayStation 2
- Release: JP: July 22, 2004; NA: September 14, 2004; EU: October 8, 2004; AU: October 29, 2004
- Genre: Scrolling shooter
- Modes: Single-player, multiplayer

Gradius V (グラディウスV, Guradiusu V) is a 2004 scrolling shooter video game published by Konami for the PlayStation 2. It was largely developed under contract by Treasure, who had previously worked on Radiant Silvergun and Ikaruga. The game is set predominantly in outer space where players control a fictional spacecraft called Vic Viper through a continuously scrolling background depicting the territories of Bacterian—an evil empire which serves as the player's enemy. Gradius V received overall positive reviews. Critics praised the level design, graphical design and "classic" revival, but criticized the game's difficulty.

== Gameplay ==
The game takes place as a 2D scrolling shooter, with the Vic Viper contending with formations of enemies, both stationary and moving, that fire bullets. Players go through levels consisting of open space and others consisting of maneuvering through close quarters which alter between horizontal and vertical scrolling. Should players come into contact with anything on the screen, the Vic Viper explodes, and they lose a life. In Gradius V, the hit box (the pixels which must be touched by an object to destroy the ship) has been reduced in size to allow players to get through small areas more easily. Gradius V marks the first time in the series in which players can reappear immediately and resume the game from where they lose a life ever since Salamander series. Alternatively, players may also restart at a previously cleared checkpoint depending on the game's settings. If all lives are lost players have the option to continue and restart the game from where they left off. Players receive extra lives after scoring a certain number of points as indicated in the game's settings, and players may receive extra continues depending on how much total playing time has been accumulated.

The game can be played with one player or with two players simultaneously. After players start the game, they will enter a "Select Weapon Array" screen, where they may select the types of power-ups they will use through the course of the game. There is also an unlockable feature called "Weapon Edit" in which players can access if certain conditions are met. In this mode, they can customize the Vic Viper with various combinations of weapons found in the "Select Weapon Array" screen, from earlier Gradius games, or new weaponry. Players are able to start the game from the beginning or at any stage that was previously cleared. Players can also play a "Score Attack" mode, where they play the game from the beginning under specific parameters. At the end of "Score Attack" mode, players receive a password which allows them to post their highest achieved score on the Internet.

The player is confronted by several enemies and uses the multiple control mechanic to direct the ship's weapons.

Finally, players have the option to view the highest local scores, save or load game data using a PlayStation 2 memory card, or to adjust the game's settings, including stereo or monoural sound, difficulty, number of lives available, the number of points required to earn extra lives, the ability to restart from a checkpoint or immediately after being destroyed, or button configuration.

Throughout the game, players can accumulate various power-up capsules after destroying certain enemies or enemy formations. Collecting a yellow power-up capsule moves a yellow cursor on the power meter at the bottom of the screen, while collecting a blue capsule will immediately erase all enemies and bullets on the screen. Pressing the "Power-Up" button will award the player the power-up that is highlighted on the power meter. The types of power-ups that can be obtained throughout the course of the game are selected at the "Select Weapon Array" and "Weapon Edit" menus before starting. The cursor cycles through the following power-ups in order: "Speed Up", "Missile", "Double", "Laser", "Multiple", and "Shield". With the "Speed Up" power-up, players are able to increase speeds of their ships; with the "Missile" power-up, players can launch air-to-surface missiles to destroy ground targets; and with the "Double" power-up, players can fire an additional gun that fires in another direction other than forward. The "Laser" power-up allows players to fire enemy-piercing lasers, the "Force Field" power-up gives players three additional hits before being destroyed, and "Multiple" power-up gives players clones (also called "Options") that shadow their movements and mimic their firing. A new feature in Gradius V gives players the ability to control their "Multiples" with the push of a button, depending on which weaponry was selected before starting the game. By pressing a button, players can freeze their Multiples in place, cause them to rotate around the Vic Viper, control the direction of their fire, or spread them out above and below the ship. It was modified from the similar system used in Gradius NEO, a mobile phone game released months before this game.

== Plot ==
During year 8010, the planet Gradius is once again invaded by the alien Bacterians, who assemble a large-scale assault force to destroy its enemies. The Vic Viper T-301 and its unnamed pilot is deployed to rout the Bacterians. During the battle, a large Bacterian spacecraft comes out of a space-time warp and attempts a kamikaze attack on Gradius, but a second Vic Viper follows it and tells the pilot that they need to destroy the spacecraft's twin cores simultaneously. This is performed successfully, and the Vic Viper leaves to continue the offensive in other locations.

Near the end of the game, the Vic Viper encounters a spacecraft in a Bacterian facility and is unable to destroy it. A study of the spacecraft reveals that it is exactly the same one that tried to smash into Gradius. Now realizing that the other Vic Viper's pilot was himself from the future, he activates a space-time portal and travels to the past in order to aid in its destruction alongside his past self. This time, the Bacterian core controlling the spacecraft speaks, revealing itself as a small part of a creature once called Venom (possibly Dr. Venom, a recurring antagonist of the Gradius series) and that the Bacterians will always return before dying. His mission done, the pilot flies the Vic Viper back to his present era.

== Development ==
We wanted to work with someone who has knowledge in the area of modern shooting. We also wanted a partner that could understand the Konami spirit. Because we absolutely had to do this production outside, Treasure was the best choice.

— Osamu Kasai, senior producer

Gradius V was officially announced on January 16, 2003 as a joint venture between Konami Computer Entertainment Tokyo and Treasure - a development studio founded by former employees of Konami. In the 2006 French documentary film Japon: Histoire Du Shooting Game, produced by CanalSat's GameOne channel, senior producer Osamu Kasai explained that because of limited resources the development of the game had to be outsourced. A potential collaborator would have to be experienced with modern shoot 'em ups and have a shared design philosophy. Kasai concluded that "Treasure was the best choice" for the project.

In an interview with the game's producer Yasushi Takano on the promotional DVD, Gradius Breakdown, Takano said that he felt the traditional Gradius formula had become stagnant and expressed a desire for a new direction for the series to remain relevant, he also admitted that some of their early work was not as impressive as it would later become. The game went through several iterations and the game was subsequently delayed and made frequent appearances at trade fairs including the Electronic Entertainment Expo and Tokyo Game Show. Plans were also made to produce a counterpart for video arcades alongside the console version, but it was canceled because of time constraints.

On April 9, 2004, Konami announced a DVD called OPTIONS was being offered to pre-ordering customers in Japan — containing interviews with the developers, art galleries and a number of videos demonstrating the inner workings of the game's levels. Adding further incentive for customers to purchase the upcoming game, Konami later revealed the availability of The History of Vic Viper — a book indicating inner design, the background and the roadmap of the Vic Viper ships. The book was included with all versions of the original Japanese pressing of the game. An additional DVD with expanded content titled Gradius V Official DVD The Perfect was also released in Japan to be ordered separately or with the game from Konami's online retail store, Konamistyle. For the North American release of the game, Konami produced a DVD called Gradius Breakdown as a pre-order incentive. Breakdown includes a retrospective of the Gradius series and a number of recorded playthroughs of the game. Gradius V was released in 2004 in Japan on July 22, North America on September 14, Europe on October 8, and Australia on October 29.

Konami also held an online high score ranking competition in the United States and the winners received a director's cut version of the Gradius Breakdown DVD that included additional pieces of concept art and videos of the later levels.

Gradius V was released for the PlayStation 3 on April 22, 2015, as part of the PS2 Classic programme.

=== Audio ===
The soundtrack was composed by Hitoshi Sakimoto whose previous video game work includes the soundtrack to the tactical role-playing game Final Fantasy Tactics, the shoot'em up Radiant Silvergun and the action/RPG hybrid Vagrant Story. Sakimoto noted in an interview that "It was a great honor for me to able to work on a title like this, but also very stressful" and names the original Gradius as an important source of inspiration on his work. He also revealed that his clients requested a music style that would be reminiscent of the earlier games, and the soundtrack as a result comprises remixes of music used in previous Gradius titles as well as original tracks. Synthesized orchestral instruments were used throughout the production of the soundtrack.

The soundtrack was released separately on CD as Gradius V Soundtracks by Konami Media Entertainment in Japan on August 18, 2004, and features 22 tracks.

== Reception ==
Reception

Aggregate score
Aggregator	Score
Metacritic	82/100

Review scores
Publication	Score
Edge	9/10
Electronic Gaming Monthly	7.83/10
Eurogamer	7/10
Famitsu	32/40
Game Informer	8.25/10
GamePro	5/5
GameSpot	8.2/10
GameSpy	5/5
GameZone	8/10
IGN	7.7/10
Official U.S. PlayStation Magazine	3.5/5

Award
Publication	Award
GameSpy	Best Shooter

Overall, Gradius V received "generally favorable reviews" according to the review aggregation website Metacritic. Positive response tends to focus on the intricate level design, graphical excellence, and "old school" appeal of the shoot 'em up genre. Most negative criticism highlights the difficulty of the game, as well as what is deemed an over-reliance on established genre conventions. According to X-Play, "While the action is always constant and involving, the lack of variation and the need to be in an exact spot at an exact time is simply not going to strike everyone as fun." In Japan, Famitsu gave it a score of one eight, one seven, one eight, and one nine for a total of 32 out of 40.
