= Gradius =

Video game series by Konami

- Genre: Scrolling shooter
- Developers: Konami (1985-present); Mobile21 (2001); Treasure (2004); M2 (2009-2025)
- Publisher: Konami
- Platforms: Amiga, Amstrad CPC, arcade, Commodore 64, Game Boy, Game Boy Advance, Windows, mobile phone, MSX, PC-88, Nintendo 3DS, Nintendo DS, NES, Nintendo Switch, PC Engine, PlayStation, PlayStation 2, PlayStation Network, PlayStation Portable, PlayStation Vita, Saturn, Super NES, Tomy Tutor, Vectrex, Wii U, Wii, X1, X68000, ZX Spectrum
- First release: Gradius; May, 1985
- Latest release: Gradius the Slot; July 2011
- Spin-offs: Salamander; Parodius; Otomedius

Gradius (Japanese: グラディウス, Hepburn: Guradiusu; /ˈɡræd.i.əs/ GRAD-ee-əss or /ˈɡreɪ.di.əs/ GRAY-dee-əss) is a series of shooter (shoot'em up) video games, introduced in 1985, developed and published by Konami for a variety of portable, console and arcade platforms. In many games in the series, the player controls a ship known as the Vic Viper.

== Games ==
Release timeline
1981	Scramble
1982–1984
1985	Gradius / Nemesis
1986	Salamander / Life Force
1987	Nemesis 2 (MSX)
1988	Gradius II
1988	Nemesis 3: The Eve of Destruction (MSX)
1989	Gradius III
1990	Nemesis (Game Boy)
1991	Gradius: The Interstellar Assault / Nemesis II
1992–1995
1996	Salamander 2
1997	Gradius Gaiden
1997	Solar Assault
1998
1999	Gradius IV
2000
2001	Gradius Galaxies
2002–2003
2004	Gradius V
2004	Gradius NEO
2005
2006	Gradius Collection
2007
2008	Gradius ReBirth
2009
2010	Gradius ARC
2011	Gradius the Slot
2012–2024
2025	Salamander III

- Scramble (1981)

An early horizontal-scrolling shooter from which gameplay elements of the Gradius series were inspired. Although there is no canonical relationship between Scramble and the Gradius series, Scramble is implied to be a spiritual predecessor to the series, evident by its appearance in flashbacks during Gradius introduction sequences (Gradius Advance). Scramble has been ported to other platforms, including MSX and Commodore 64. In 2002, Scramble appeared on GBA as one of the titles featured in Konami Collector's Series: Arcade Advanced as well as later Konami game compilations for PlayStation and Nintendo DS.

- Gradius (1985)

The first true Gradius game to introduce the concept of the 'weapon bar'. During the game, many enemy craft leave behind items or 'pick-ups' when destroyed that can be used to power up or modify the player's vessel. Collecting one of these will shift the selection cursor along the weapon bar at the bottom of the screen. The player can then select the weapon highlighted if they want it. The cursor then resets. In general, the more useful 'power-ups' are towards the right-hand side of the bar, so the player may decide to stock up on pick-ups until the better item is available. This innovation allowed for deeper tactics on the part of the player and for greater freedom of weapon choice rather than relying on the pre-determined power-ups common in other games in the genre. Originally released as an arcade game, its popularity resulted in ports to the ZX Spectrum, Commodore 64, NES/Famicom, MSX, Master System, X68000, Amstrad CPC and PC Engine. More recently, ports to the Saturn, PlayStation, and certain mobile phones were created. (Saturn, PlayStation and computer versions are all packaged with Gradius II as Gradius Deluxe Pack). In addition, the NES version was re-released for Virtual Console, NES Classic Edition, and the PC Engine version on the PlayStation Network. In territories outside Japan, the arcade and MSX versions of Gradius were released under the title Nemesis.

- Salamander/Life Force (1986)

Set in the same continuity as Gradius. The game is noteworthy for a number of reasons. Most prominently, the game switches between horizontal and vertical stages, one of the first games of its kind to do so, and it was also one of the first shoot 'em ups to include cooperative gameplay.

The first player ship is Gradius's own Vic Viper ship, while the second ship is the Lord British space destroyer (sometimes called the "RoadBritish") which is based on the F-16 Fighting Falcon. Unlike Gradius, Salamander uses a more conventional weapons system, with enemies leaving a wide variety of distinct power-ups. The NES version of Salamander, called Life Force in North America (and marketed in that region as the "sequel" to the first Gradius), and the MSX version used the power meter from the Gradius series. There also exists an arcade game named Life Force that is identical to Salamander released in Japanese arcades the same year, except that a Gradius-style power meter is used instead of conventional power-up items, and the stages were recolored slightly as well as given some voiceovers to make the mission about traveling inside someone's body, rather than through space. Stages took on names such as "Kidney Zone" and "Stomach". An American release was also made, but it retained the original power-up system of Salamander, though it was renamed as Life Force.

- Nemesis 2 (1987)

The MSX Gradius 2 is unrelated to the second arcade Gradius game (which used the Roman numeral "II"). Instead of controlling Vic Viper, the available ship is called "Metalion" (code name N322). Like the MSX version of Salamander, this game also has a storyline, which is told through cutscenes. The gameplay is mostly unchanged from the rest of the series, though there are some power-ups that temporarily give the ship some enhancements. In addition, when the bosses are defeated, the Metalion can fly inside them before they explode, and a smaller level will start that awards weapon upgrades when finished without dying, depending on the speed at which the boss was defeated. In the same year, Zemina released a version for the Korean Master System. This version was ported to the X68000 computer under the name Nemesis '90 Kai, with a number of graphical and aural enhancements. A graphically enhanced version with smooth scrolling appeared in the Japan-exclusive PSP Salamander Portable collection.

- Gradius II (1988)

Bearing no relation to the MSX game titled Gradius 2, Gradius II is the chronological sequel to Gradius. The game did not see a North American release until 2006 as part of the PlayStation Portable title Gradius Collection. On November 12, 2020, it was released on the Nintendo Switch as part of Hamster's Arcade Archives series. It was released as Vulcan Venture in territories outside Japan.

- Nemesis 3: The Eve of Destruction (1988)

The fourth game of the series to be released for the MSX platform. "Gofer no Yabō" (GOFERの野望) is also the subtitle of Gradius II for arcade. Like the other MSX titles in the series, Nemesis 3 has an over-arcing plot depicted through the use of narrative cutscenes. Nemesis 3 retains Gradius 2's weapon capture system, although weapons are obtained by navigating the player's ship into secret alcoves scattered throughout stages rather than entering enemy core ships. The game additionally allows the player to select a preset weapon configuration before starting.

- Gradius III (1989)

This title introduced the "Weapon Edit" method of selecting weapons, which allowed players to create their own weapon array by choosing power-ups from a limited pool of available weapon types (some weapons in the preset weapon types are not selectable in Weapon Edit mode, although it includes weapons not in any presets).

The Super Nintendo Entertainment System (SNES)/SFC port includes alterations to levels, enemies, and weapons. For example, two stages were cut out in the SNES version: a 3D stage which involved avoiding hitting cave walls from a unique first-person perspective behind the Vic Viper, and a crystal stage in which the Vic Viper was challenged by crystal blocks blocking off areas like a maze. In addition, the order of stages was changed. The final stage in the SNES version was based on an early stage in the arcade version. The original arcade version's ending had the main boss in a mechanical setting, then going through a speed-up zone to escape the enemy base, whereas the SNES version had the player simply avoiding the final enemy's simple and slow-moving attack patterns with no challenge afterward. However, the SNES version introduced the Rotate and Formation Option types, both of which were reused in Gradius V. The difficulty and major boss tactics were toned down to make it easier. The original arcade version is available for PlayStation 2 bundled with Gradius IV (Gradius III and IV), although the port has some slight differences from the original.

- Picadilly Gradius (1989)

Only released in Japan, this spin-off game is a token gambling game with a Gradius theme.

- Nemesis (1990)

The first Gradius for a portable system, released on Nintendo's Game Boy. The name Nemesis was kept for the game's worldwide release, as the game retains some of the elements that were otherwise exclusive to the MSX titles, such as hidden bonus stages. It was later ported with full color support as one of the four games in the Konami GB Collection Vol.1 for Game Boy Color entitled "Gradius".

- Gradius: The Interstellar Assault (1991)

Another Gradius game exclusively for the Game Boy. It was one of the larger Game Boy carts in existence at the time (2-Megabits), and was completely different from the rest of the series. Most Gradius games used music, enemies, bosses, and even levels from previous games in the series, but this one did not, except for the boss music from the first Gradius game with the addition of a small original section to the piece. A little bit of the "between levels" music from Gradius III can also be found at the very first part of the game. It was released as Nemesis II in Japan and as Nemesis II: Return of the Hero in Europe. A colorized version was featured in the European Konami GB Collection Vol.4, titled Gradius II.

- Salamander 2 (1996)

The follow-up to Salamander. It had several unique features, such as the Option Shot, the ability to launch the Options as homing projectiles. After firing, an Option would revert to a smaller, less powerful unit called an Option Seed, which revolves around the ship firing the default shot. Weaponry includes the Twin Laser, the Ripple Laser, and the standard Laser. Like its predecessor, Salamander 2 uses a conventional power-up system, rather than the Gradius power meter. Upon acquiring a second power-up of the same type, the player's weapons are twice as powerful for a short duration (10 seconds). The game features variations of previous Salamander bosses, such as the Golem and Tetran.

- Gradius Gaiden (1997)

The first Gradius produced exclusively for a home console. This is also the only Gradius game (other than Gofer no Yabō Episode II on the MSX) where players can select which ship they wish to use. Gradius Gaiden includes the Lord British Space Destroyer from Salamander and two (relative) newcomers: the Jade Knight and the Falchion β (a variation of the ship from the Famicom Disk System game Falsion). It was originally released for the PlayStation console and ported in 2006 as part of Gradius Collection for the PlayStation Portable. In 2019, it was included in the Japanese version of the PlayStation Classic mini console.

- Solar Assault (1997)

Solar Assault is an arcade 3D rail shooter in the lines of Star Fox or Panzer Dragoon, with Gradius's settings. Along with Vic Viper, two other ship choices are available: Lord British and Alpina. Due to never being ported to any console systems, Solar Assault is a relatively obscure part of the Gradius series.

- Gradius IV (1999)

Released in Japanese arcades as Gradius IV Fukkatsu ("fukkatsu" (復活) being Japanese for "revival", since it was the first arcade Gradius game in 10 years, following 1989's Gradius III). Gradius IV lacked the Weapon Edit function of its predecessor, but it had a bigger array of weaponry than the original Gradius games. Weapons exclusive to this game included the Vertical Mine missile (which detonates in a vertical line shortly after deployment) and the Armor Piercing laser (a shorter-ranged, more powerful laser). It was released on the PS2 in a compilation pack together with the arcade version of Gradius III (Gradius III and IV).

- Gradius Galaxies (2001)

Gradius Galaxies is the first Gradius to be created by a development team other than Konami's own internal teams (by Mobile21, to be exact). A Game Boy Advance title, Gradius Advance is known as Gradius Galaxies in the United States and as Gradius Generation in Japan. The Japanese version, being the last to be released, has a number of exclusive challenge modes added. It also includes an additional, invisible 5000 point bonus in one of the levels.

- Gradius V (2004)

Gradius V was released in September 2004 for the PlayStation 2. Graphics are rendered in full 3D, although gameplay is still mostly 2D; some areas change the position and perspective of the camera to emphasize the 3D environment. Treasure (developers of Gunstar Heroes, Guardian Heroes, Radiant Silvergun and Ikaruga, among others) were primarily responsible for Gradius V's development. In the Japanese first-press limited edition, the game included a book detailing internal design, background, and a road map of the Vic Viper series (i.e., "Vic Viper" is the name of a ship series, rather than a single ship), and pre-ordered North American copies included a DVD detailing the history of the series (including Scramble) and replays of Gradius V.

- Gradius NEO (2004)

Released only to mobile phones, Gradius NEO features a new storyline, taking place roughly 2000 years after the last Nemesis. It is also the first game in the Gradius series to give players the ability to control their "Multiples" in formations, with formations variable depending on buttons.

- Gradius Collection (2006)

A Gradius compilation for PlayStation Portable. This compilation contains the classic versions of Gradius I-IV with a few bonus features, as well as the first international release of Gradius Gaiden.

- Gradius ReBirth (2008)

A Gradius title for WiiWare. Gradius Rebirth draws most of its elements from the MSX games rather than mainstay Gradius staples. The game's plot sets the stage for the events depicted in Gradius 2 (MSX).

- Gradius ARC (2010)

In March 2010, a Japanese trademark database update revealed a filing for this name, submitted by Konami. The "Arc" portion of the name coincided with a pre-release name of the PlayStation Move. This was only a coincidence, however, as Gradius Arc —Ginyoku no Densetsu— (Gradius Arc —Legend of the Silvery Wings—) was revealed on September 30, 2010, to be a tactical RPG for cell phones.

- Gradius the Slot (2011)

A pachislot game released in Japan in July 2011. It was developed by the KPE division of Konami. A soundtrack for the game was released in September 2011.

- Gradius Origins (2025)

A compilation of seven previous Gradius games, developed by M2. The compilation includes Gradius, Salamander, Life Force, Gradius II, Gradius III, Salamander 2, and a new game, Salamander III.

=== Spin-offs ===
- Parodius series (1988–2010)

The Parodius series, started in 1988, is similar to Gradius, but with more cartoony settings. The name is a portmanteau of "parody" and "Gradius". The Parodius series parodies many of the common elements of the Gradius series, including neon-colored core warships, effeminate moai, and large dancing women as bosses. Early games focused mainly on parodying Gradius games, but more recent games have poked fun at other Konami franchises, including Castlevania and Ganbare Goemon. The games offer a large number of different characters to use, each with different weapons. The characters consist of ones created for the series, such as Takosuke, and popular Konami characters like Pentarou and Upa (from Bio Miracle Bokutte Upa). Vic Viper also appears in all titles. The Parodius games also distinguish themselves from the Gradius series with their music. Unlike the Gradius games, whose soundtracks are either unique to each game or refer to earlier games in the series, the music in the Parodius games parodies a diverse pool of public domain sources, including a large contingent of classical music.

- Moai-kun (1990)

A platform game released on the Famicom starring an anthropomorphic moai statue.

- Cosmic Wars (1989)

A spin-off tactical turn-based strategy game taking place in the Gradius series. Was released only on the Famicom in Japan. The game received a sequel in 1997, with Paro Wars, which is the Parodius equivalent of this game.

- Otomedius (2007)

A newer take from Konami on the Gradius spoof, this game features anime girl representations, designed by Mine Yoshizaki, of Vic Viper and Lord British, in a mecha musume-style approach. The name is a portmanteau of "otome" (乙女, a Japanese word meaning "maiden") and "Gradius."

=== Cancelled games ===
- Vic Viper

Vic Viper (Note: Japanese: ビックバイパー, Hepburn: Bikku Baipā) is an unreleased coin-op racing video game from Konami. It was to star the Vic Viper, and various other vehicles, in a game resembling the F-Zero or Wipeout series. It was first shown at the 1995 JAMMA show.

In September 2011, the game's completed soundtrack was released on disc 10 of Konami Shooting Collection, an album featuring soundtracks from Salamander, TwinBee, and many other Konami shoot 'em ups, as well as other related games.

- Gradius 64
- Gradius VI was originally announced in the 2005 Tokyo Game Show. This was one of the developing titles for the PlayStation 3, scheduled for the 2006 release. However, for unknown reasons, the development was delayed and, eventually, completely scrapped.

== Common elements ==
There are several gameplay elements that are common to almost all of the Gradius games. These include the power meter, one of the Gradius series' defining characteristics, which is enabled by power-up items. The items upgrade the selected ability in the power meter. The meter resets when the player chooses to activate the selected ability. Weapon edit lets players create their own power meter sequence.

The concept of the "Core" is a central part of Gradius. Cores are usually blue, glowing masses of energy hidden within large warships and protected by a series of barriers. All cores must be targeted in order to defeat a warship, which normally comprises several phases and often uses the terrain to its advantage. In some cases, a core is closed or not vulnerable at the beginning of a battle, only opening or becoming susceptible to attack some moments later by turning blue. Additionally, the announcer will normally urge the player to "Destroy the core!" or "Shoot the core!" prior to an encounter. For other types of bosses, like large beasts, the announcer may command the player to "Destroy the eye!" or "Destroy the mouth!", depending on the boss.

The moai statues of Easter Island (Chile) appear as enemies in several Gradius games. They are mounted on either side of flat, free-floating platforms and fire a series of colorful rings at the Vic Viper. Upon completing the game, the player restarts on the first level while retaining their upgrades from the previous games. Each cycle through the game grows progressively more difficult.

=== Konami Code ===
The Nintendo Entertainment System port of Gradius represents the first ever use of the Konami Code in a video game. If the player pauses the game and enters the Konami Code (Up, Up, Down, Down, Left, Right, Left, Right, B, A), they will be given extra lives and various power-ups.

== Development ==
The Gradius series was created when Hiroyasu Machiguchi, the series creator was given a team to work with and asked everyone what kind of game they wanted to develop, to which they responded being a shoot 'em up, with the intent of surpassing Namco's Xevious. They decided to make it a horizontal shooting game because they wanted to reuse material from Scramble as much as possible, and Gradius was originally named Scramble 2. The development lasted for a year after refining and experimenting with the gameplay. The team originally tried twenty different movement patterns for the Options and used a process of elimination when something did not work. For the story, Hiroyasu's team was inspired by science fiction movies, with the popular sci-fi films at the time being Star Wars and the anime adaptations of Lensman. The team saw Lensman together and it influenced the game's story. Its plasma laser also left a big impression on them and was why Gradius featured a Laser weapon. The Moai were included because they wanted to add a mysterious element to the game like Xevious and its Nazca Lines.

== Reception and legacy ==
Hideki Kamiya stated in an interview that Gradius is one of the top three key inspirational games from his past.

Several of Gradius' starfighters, Core bosses, and various game elements have been adapted into trading cards as part of Konami's Yu-Gi-Oh! Trading Card Game.

== In other media ==
=== Manga ===
- Gradius: Michi Tono Tatakai
- Gradius, was one of the videogames providing the basis for manga titled Famicom Ryu (1985–1987) and Nekketsu! Famicom Shounendan (1986–1987), published by Comic Coro Coro.
- Nemesis is one of the video games featured in the manga titled Rock'n Game Boy, by Shigeto Ikehara and published by Comic BomBom from October 1989 to December 1991.
- Gradius III is one of the video games featured in the manga titled Cyber Boy, by Nagai Noriaki and published by Comic BomBom from April 1991 to February 1993.

=== TCG ===
- Several cards in the Yu-Gi-Oh! trading card game are based on the Gradius series.
