= Gradius III =

1989 video game

- Japanese arcade flyer
- Developer: Konami
- Publisher: Konami
- Director: Hiroyasu Machiguchi
- Series: Gradius
- Platforms: Arcade, Super NES, PlayStation 2, PlayStation Portable
- Release: December 1989: Arcade; JP: December 1989; AS: December 1989; Super NES: JP: December 21, 1990; NA: August 23, 1991
- Genre: Scrolling shooter
- Mode: Single-player
- Arcade system: Konami GX945

Gradius III (Note: Known in Japan as Gradius III: Densetsu kara Shinwa e (グラディウスIII -伝説から神話ヘ-, Gradiusu Surī: Densetsu kara Shinwa e; lit. "Gradius III: From Legend to Myth")) is a 1989 scrolling shooter video game developed and published by Konami for arcades. It was originally released only in Japan on December 11, 1989. It is the third game in the Gradius series. The game was ported to the Super Nintendo Entertainment System in Japan in 1990 and North America in 1991, and served as a launch title for the system in North America. The arcade version would never see the light of day in the West until it was included alongside Gradius IV in a two-in-one compilation (Gradius III & IV) for the PlayStation 2 and in the Gradius Collection for the PlayStation Portable.

== Gameplay ==
The original arcade version of Gradius III is known by fans as being considerably more difficult than its successors.

The player pilots the Vic Viper starfighter to battle the onslaughts of the Bacterion Empire. There are a total of ten levels in the game, with stage 4 being something of a bonus level; here, the player controls the Vic Viper in a third-person perspective and must avoid colliding with walls. Though the level is completely devoid of any enemies, free floating power-ups are scattered throughout. There are also two hidden levels that are based on the early sections of Gradius and Salamander. The game contains the familiar weapons, level layouts, and enemies that have become trademarks of the series.

Like the Japanese versions of previous games in the series, Gradius III does not include a continuation feature; if the player loses their lives, the game will be over. The Japanese version of the game contains a 'beginner mode' that allows the player to venture through the first three levels at a much easier difficulty. At the end of the third level, the game will bid the player to try the game again at the normal difficulty ('technical mode'), which can loop endlessly. The Asian (non-Japanese) arcade release lacks the beginner mode and retrospective introduction sequence, but reduces the difficulty overall.

In addition to new pre-defined weapon schemes, Gradius III introduces the "Edit Mode"; players can mix and match missile, double, laser, shield and "special" ("!") power-ups into their own custom combination. Some of the weapons available in pre-defined schemes can not be used in custom schemes, and vice versa.

== Release ==
A port of Gradius III was released for the Super Famicom in Japan in December 1990 and for the Super NES in North America in 1991, with the option of reduced difficulty and additional armaments for the Vic Viper. It replicates the slowdown of its arcade counterpart and discards the pseudo-3D and crystal/"cube rush" stages. The cell stage is also swapped to being the final stage instead of the sixth stage like in the arcade version, it is also given a whole new layout and soundtrack. It also introduces a boss called Beacon which awaits the player at the end of the new high-speed stage, which is a counterpart of the high-speed stage in Gradius II.

Unlike the original arcade version, the Super NES port is the only one that allow players to continue when they lost all their lives. A harder difficulty called "Arcade" can be unlocked by inputting a code (quickly tapping the "A" button 16 times in 1 second) on the options screen, however, it is simply the same game at a harder difficulty, and not an accurate port of the arcade version. This port was also released on the Wii's Virtual Console on April 23, 2007, in North America, and in September 2007 in Europe and Japan.

A soundtrack containing the original music as well as arranged tracks, was released by Konami on the King Records label on February 21, 1990, composed and performed by Kukeiha Club with Miki Higashino. Additionally, several albums containing arrangements of the music from this game were released in the years to follow. Konami also released a soundtrack album containing music from Gradius III as well as other Gradius games, entitled Gradius Arcade Soundtrack on April 24, 2002.

The "Gradius III Symphonic Poetry" track was released by Kukeiha Club on June 5, 1990, and contains many orchestrated tracks from both Gradius III and numerous previous games. A prime example of its diversity is the "Final Battle" track, which contains numerous variations on the "Crystal World" and "Boss Battle" tracks in Gradius II: Gofer's Ambition.

In 2000, Konami bundled Gradius III and Gradius IV together for release on the PlayStation 2 video game console, as Gradius III and IV. The port is based on the arcade version and has an unlockable Extra Edit mode, which gives the player the freedom to create a weapon array from all included setups and adds the F-Option, R-Option and Reduce II power-ups found in the Super NES port. The Reduce from the SNES port returns the player one step closer to the Vic Viper's original size when hit, giving it protection from two hits. As the PlayStation 2 hardware is more capable than the game's original arcade hardware, in certain technically demanding moments of the game the PlayStation 2 is able to maintain normal operating speed in situations that would normally introduce "slowdown" (half-speed operation) on the original hardware. To recreate this gameplay characteristic, KCET implemented an optional "WAIT LEVEL" regulator that can be adjusted from three levels at any point in the game, beginning from 0 to 2 (original rate). While the PS2 version doesn't have the option to continue as the Super NES version, it features the possibility to select any stage the player has cleared.

Gradius III was later ported to the PlayStation Portable in 2006 as part of Gradius Collection. This version keeps the tradition of not allowing the player to continue after exhausting all reserve ships.

== Reception ==
Reception

Aggregate score
Aggregator	Score
GameRankings	77.50% (SNES)

Review score
Publication	Score
Famitsu	7/10, 7/10, 6/10, 5/10 (SNES); 8/10, 8/10, 9/10, 8/10 (SNES)

In Japan, Game Machine listed Gradius III on their January 15, 1990 issue as being the third most-successful table arcade unit of the month.

Gradius III received positive to favorable reviews. IGN gave the game a score 8.5 out of 10 for impressive graphics and game-play. GameSpot give the game score 7.0 out of 10 for Virtual Console and criticizing the game for its high difficulty. In the Japanese video game magazine Famicom Tsūshin, two reviewers complimented the ability to adjust the difficulty level, while still finding themselves struggling with the game. The third reviewer also commented how the game was changed from the arcade game, saying it was "modified quite a bit from the original" and played more like Gradius (1985). The fourth reviewer however, wrote that the game was not difficult enough and did not feel the excitement that he had from the arcade game.

According to GamePro's The Feature Creature, "Gradius III is one of the most durable side-scrolling shooters. It wasn't a breakthrough when it came out in 1991, but it did approximate the great arcade shooters pretty well."

Entertainment Weekly gave the game a C and remarked that it was similar to previous Gradius games, and thus not worth investing 50 dollars for.

Super Gamer reviewed the SNES version and gave an overall score of 78% stating: "Gradius III incorporates all of the features that make for a great arcade game!"

In 2018, Complex ranked Gradius III 46th on their "The Best Super Nintendo Games of All Time." IGN rated Gradius III 45th in its Top 100 SNES Games. They praised the visuals, the environments and bosses saying: "A true sight to behold."
