= Gradius II =

1988 video game

- North American arcade flyer
- Developer: Konami
- Publishers: Konami; Consoles; Hudson Soft
- Directors: Hiroyasu Machiguchi; Famicom; Shigeharu Umezaki
- Programmers: Toshiaki Takatori; PC Engine; Koji Igarashi
- Composers: Shinji Tasaka; Motoaki Furukawa; Kenichi Matsubara; Seiichi Fukami; Famicom; Hidenori Maezawa; Yukie Morimoto
- Series: Gradius
- Platforms: Arcade, Famicom, PC Engine Super CD-ROM², X68000, Windows, mobile phone
- Release: March 1988: Arcade; JP: March 1988; NA: April 1988; EU: 1988 Famicom; JP: December 16, 1988 X68000; JP: February 7, 1992 PC Engine Super CD-ROM²; JP: December 18, 1992 Windows; JP: February 21, 1997 Mobile i-mode; JP: February 19, 2004 Windows Phone; JP: January 19, 2010
- Genre: Scrolling shooter
- Mode: Single-player
- Arcade system: Konami Twin 16

Gradius II, (Note: Known in Japan as Gradiusu Tsū: Gofā no Yabō (グラディウスII GOFER(ゴーファー)の野望(やぼう); lit. Gradius II: Gofer's Ambition)) retitled Vulcan Venture in North American arcades, is a 1988 horizontally scrolling shooter video game developed and published by Konami. It is the sequel to Gradius and was succeeded by Gradius III. Initially released in arcades, ports of Gradius II were released for the Family Computer (under the shortened title of Gradius II), PC Engine Super CD-ROM², and the X68000 in Japan. The original arcade version is also included in the Gradius Deluxe Pack compilation for the PlayStation and Sega Saturn and in Gradius Collection for the PlayStation Portable.

== Gameplay ==
The player returns as the role of the pilot of the Vic Viper spaceship to battle the second onslaughts of the Bacterion Empire, under the new leadership of Gofer, the giant head. Gradius II has kept the gameplay from the original game, but infused it with enhancements brought from the spin-off, Salamander (Life Force). This is primarily evident in two of the weapons configurations that are selectable. Another first in the series was the inclusion of the "boss rush" (also known as "boss parade" or "boss alley"), a level designed entirely with only boss confrontations.

Gradius II retains the selection bar from Gradius, but now the player can choose between four different weapon configurations and progressions. All schemes have speed-up and multiples (Options), but have differing 'Missile', 'Double' (laser), and 'Laser' weapons. The player can have at most four multiples. Additionally, there are also two types of shielding to choose from: shield and forcefield. The shield option adds more durability, but only for the front of the Vic Viper, while the forcefield adds protection for the entire spacecraft, albeit only against three hits. In the Famicom version, choosing another multiple after four will make the four multiples to move around the spacecraft for 16 seconds; force field is the only shielding available for protection of the entire spacecraft, withstanding five hits and it is included in four different weapon configurations and progressions; and 'Double' and 'Laser' have to be activated twice to achieve full performance.

The PC Engine version offers a different ending screen after completing the game, depending on difficulty select.

== Release ==
The game was first ported to the Family Computer in 1988 and was never released outside Japan. Presumably this was due to the fact that the Famicom version employed a custom memory mapper dubbed the VRC4, which enhanced some of the game's graphics, such as animation, thus converting the game to a standard memory mapper (as Konami later did with Castlevania III: Dracula's Curse) would have been too time-consuming (since the original Gradius was not as popular overseas as it was in Japan).

A PC Engine Super CD-ROM² port was later released only in Japan in 1992. The graphics remained nearly unaltered, the background music is mostly the arcade version's soundtrack in redbook audio format, and one additional stage was added that is similar to the temple stage in the NES version of Life Force and the first stage of Gradius III.

Gradius II was later re-released in the Japanese exclusive Gradius Deluxe Pack for the PlayStation, Sega Saturn and Microsoft Windows in 1996, and for the first time a worldwide release on the Gradius Collection for the PlayStation Portable in 2006. There was also a release for Mobile phones on 2004 and Windows Phone on 2010. No version of Gradius II saw a release in North America until its inclusion in the Gradius Collection in 2006. The Famicom and PC Engine ports were re-released for the Wii Virtual Console in 2007, the latter getting an international release. Hamster Corporation released the game as part of their Arcade Archives series for the PlayStation 4 in 2016 and Nintendo Switch in 2020; this was included in Konami's own Arcade Classics Anniversary Collection for the Nintendo Switch, PlayStation 4, Windows and Xbox One. Multiple versions of the game were included in the 2025 Gradius Origins compilation.

== Reception ==
In Japan, Game Machine listed Gradius II on their May 1, 1988 issue as being the second most-successful table arcade unit of the month. It went on to become Japan's third highest-grossing arcade game of 1988.

Review aggregator GameRankings scored Gradius II at 80%

IGN gave the Virtual Console release of the PC Engine version an 8 out of 10, praising the ability to choose which power-ups the player character has access to before entering a stage and the inclusion of useful cheat codes "to offset the otherwise potentially overwhelming difficulty".

Nintendo Life also gave the PC Engine version an 8 out of 10, praising the new additional features that is not present in arcade version like the animated intro sequence and new exclusive stage.
