= Gradius (video game) =

1985 video game

- Japanese arcade flyer
- Developer: Konami
- Publisher: Konami
- Director: Hiroyasu Machiguchi
- Composer: Miki Higashino
- Series: Gradius
- Platform: Arcade: NES, MSX, PC-8801, X1, ZX Spectrum, X68000, Commodore 64, Amstrad CPC, PC Engine
- Release: May 1985: Arcade; JP: May 1985; EU: September 1985; NA: December 1985 NES; JP: April 25, 1986; NA: December 1986; EU: November 30, 1988 MSX; JP: July 25, 1986 ZX Spectrum; UK: February 1987 C64, CPC; EU: 1987 PC Engine; JP: November 15, 1991
- Genre: Scrolling shooter
- Modes: Single-player, multiplayer
- Arcade system: Bubble System, Nintendo VS. System, PlayChoice-10

Gradius (Note: Japanese: グラディウス, Hepburn: Guradiusu) is a 1985 horizontally scrolling shooter video game developed and published by Konami for arcades. It is the first installment in the Gradius series. The player maneuvers a spacecraft known as the Vic Viper that must defend itself from the various alien enemies. The game uses a power-up system called the "power meter", based upon collecting capsules to acquire additional weapons.

The arcade version of Gradius was initially released internationally outside Japan under the title of Nemesis, but subsequent home releases have since used the original title. During development, it had the working title Scramble 2, as it was originally intended to be a follow-up to Konami's earlier shooter Scramble (1981). Home versions were released for various platforms, such as the Nintendo Entertainment System, the MSX home computer, and the PC Engine. It was a major success in 1986, becoming the year's highest-grossing arcade game in London and one of Japan's top five table arcade games, while the Famicom port sold over a million copies in Japan that year. Nintendo released the NES version in arcades for the Nintendo VS. System as VS. Gradius and PlayChoice-10 in November 1986.

Gradius was critically acclaimed for its gameplay and at the time unique power-up system. Along with Namco's Xevious, it is cited as being one of the most important shooter games, having paved the way for many similar games to follow.

== Gameplay ==
The player's ship, the Vic Viper, exchanging shots with enemy Moai in the game's third stage. The player's power meter is towards the bottom of the screen.

The player controls the trans-dimensional spaceship Vic Viper and must battle waves of enemies through various environments. The game became synonymous with the phrase, "Destroy the core!", as the standard of boss battles in the Gradius series involved combat with a giant craft, in the center of which would be situated one to several blue colored spheres. These bosses were designed in such a way that there was a straight passage from the exterior of the giant craft leading directly to one of these cores. The player must fire shots into this passage while avoiding attack patterns from weapon emplacements on the body of the boss. However, small but destructible walls are situated in this passage, impeding the bullet shots from damaging the core, and must be whittled away by repeated well-placed shots. In a way, these tiny walls represent the boss' shielding gauge until its core is finally vulnerable to attack. Some bosses can regenerate these walls. When the core has sustained enough hits, it usually changes color from blue to red, indicating that it is in critical condition and its destruction is imminent. Upon the destruction of a core, a piece of the boss may be put out of commission, seeing that it is no longer powered by a core, or if all of the cores are destroyed, the entire boss is defeated and explodes. Cores are not present on the more organic bosses of Gradius. Such bosses have weak spots in places such as a mouth, head or eye.

When gameplay begins, the Vic Viper is relatively slow and has only a weak gun. This level of capability is generally insufficient for engaging all but the weakest single-hit enemies, but the Vic Viper can gain greater capabilities by collecting and using power-up items. While most arcade games utilize distinct power up-items that each correspond to a specific effect on the player character, Gradius has a single power-up item. The effect of this power-up item is to advance the currently selected item in a power-up menu that appears at the bottom of the screen. When the desired power-up is highlighted, the player can obtain it by pressing the power-up button, returning the menu to its initial state in which no power-up is highlighted.

== Development ==
Gradius was the creation of Konami game designer Machiguchi Hiroyasu, and it was the first video game he publicly released. Hiroyasu joined the company in the early 1980s, as a programmer, at a time when Konami was trying to transition from being a producer of medal machines to a videogame developer. Konami assigned him to a small team with the task of producing a game that could establish the company in the videogame market. He asked the team what kind of game they'd like to work on, and they replied that they wanted to make another shooting game. The shoot 'em up genre had seen a resurgence at the time with Namco's Xevious, and the goal of this project became to make a shooter that could surpass Xevious. The project was at first intended to be a follow-up to Konami's earlier game Scramble (1981); it was titled Scramble 2 and reused many of Scramble's materials and game mechanics.

Development of Gradius lasted for about a year, a time filled with anxiety for the production team due to a lack of confidence in creating their first game. Members of the project came up with ideas that were then tested on the arcade monitor to see if they worked. While designing the Option satellites, the team tested over 20 different movement patterns which were whittled down through the process of elimination. The game was produced for the Konami Bubble System 16-bit arcade hardware. Hiroyasu wanted the game to have a visually distinct world with unique enemies and locations, which was something relatively uncommon for shooters at the time. Inspiration for mechanics and story were derived from films such as Star Wars: A New Hope and Lensman, with the Laser weapon being directly taken from those in Lensman. The idea for a power-meter mechanic stemmed from the team's desire to give players the freedom to select whichever weapons they pleased. Early versions had the player collecting individual pick-up icons, which were cut for not being "satisfying" enough; it was instead replaced with a selection bar where players collected capsules to allow access to other weapons, an idea based on the function keys on a keyboard. The Moai enemies were added to pay homage to Xevious and its Nazca lines as well as giving the game a sense of mystery.

== Releases ==
=== Arcade ===
Gradius was first released in Japan for Konami's Bubble System, an arcade board which allowed operators to change the software through the use of proprietary "Bubble Software" cartridge media based on magnetic bubble memory. The game was distributed as a standard printed circuit board in North America and Europe under the title of Nemesis. The North American version of Nemesis features a considerably increased difficulty compared to the Japanese and European version. To balance this, the game spawns a fleet of orange enemies when the player loses a life to provide as many power-up capsules as possible to recover as many upgrades as possible. Also the North American version presents a continue feature (but only for three times). The title screen was also updated, showing an in-game reproduction of the promotional artwork behind the logo.

The original Gradius is also included in various compilations such as Gradius Deluxe Pack for the PlayStation, Sega Saturn and Microsoft Windows, and Gradius Collection for the PlayStation Portable. Hamster Corporation released the game as part of their Arcade Archives series for the PlayStation 4 in 2015 and Nintendo Switch in 2020. This particular version was included by Konami in their Arcade Classics Anniversary Collection, released in 2019 for the Nintendo Switch, PlayStation 4, Xbox One and Windows.

=== Famicom/NES ===
The first home conversion of Gradius was released for Nintendo's Famicom console on April 25, 1986, in Japan. Due to the hardware limitations of the Famicom, many of the level designs were simplified (the Moai stage, for example, lacked the vertical scrolling present in the arcade game), and the maximum amount of options that the player can upgrade to was reduced from four to two. This version added a cheat code that could be entered while the game was paused that granted the player's ship almost all the power-ups. This code appeared again in many later Konami games such as Contra and Life Force, ultimately becoming known as the Konami Code. The international version for the Nintendo Entertainment System was released in North America in December 1986. It was the first NES game to be released by Konami in the region and, unlike the original arcade game, the title was kept unchanged between regions. It was re-released as part of the Nintendo Classics service on September 19, 2018.

The NES version was made available in arcades as a Nintendo VS. System board (under the title of VS. Gradius) and as a PlayChoice-10 cartridge. VS. Gradius was distributed to arcades by Nintendo. This version was released by Hamster Corporation as part of their Arcade Archives series for the Nintendo Switch and PlayStation 4 in 2019, distinct from their release of the original arcade version years prior.

=== MSX ===
The MSX version of Gradius was released on July 25, 1986, in Japan, a few months after the Famicom version. It was also released in Europe under the Nemesis title. This version changed similar to the Famicom version but adds its slew of exclusive content to make up for the downgrade. A new stage, the bone planet was added between the Inverted Volcano stage and the Antennoid stage, featuring exclusive enemy types. There also four hidden warp zones and the ability to play as the titular ship from TwinBee if the cartridge for the MSX version of that game is inserted in the second cartridge slot.

=== PC Engine ===
The PC Engine version of Gradius was released in Japan on November 15, 1991. Released on a 2-Megabit HuCard, it had relatively few omissions compared to the NES and MSX versions and added a Desert Planet stage similar to the Bone Planet stage from the MSX version. Because of the lower resolution of the PC Engine compared to the original arcade hardware, the PC Engine features some slight vertical scrolling.

=== Other platforms ===
In addition to the MSX, Gradius was also ported to other microcomputers shortly after its release, such as the ZX Spectrum, Amstrad CPC and Commodore 64 in Europe (as Nemesis: The Final Challenge), as well as the PC-8801 and X1 in Japan. A port for the X68000 computer was also included in the early models of the computer.

== Audio ==
- Alfa Records released a limited-edition soundtrack album for this game (Konami Game Music Vol.1 – 28XA-85) on 27 June 1986.
- Apollon Music released a limited-edition soundtrack album for this game (Original Sound of Gradius – KHY1016) on 5 May 1987.
- Also, disc 1 of Konami Music Masterpiece Collection, which was released on October 1, 2004, is mostly devoted to Gradius.

== Reception ==
Reception

Review scores
Publication	Score					
Publication	Arcade	C64	NES	PC	Wii	ZX
ACE			890/1000			
AllGame	4.5/5		4.5/5			
Crash						59%
Computer and Video Games	Positive	37/40	90%	37/40		37/40
GameSpot					7.2/10	
IGN					7/10	
Sinclair User						5/5
Your Sinclair						8/10
Commodore User		9/10				
Computer Gamer	Positive					

Awards
Publication	Award
Famitsu Best Hit Game Awards	Best Shooting Game; Game of the Year (2nd)
Computer and Video Games	Game of the Month
Sinclair User	SU Classic

=== Arcade ===
In Japan, Game Machine listed Gradius as the most popular arcade game of June 1985. It went on to be Japan's fifth highest-grossing table arcade game of 1986. In the United Kingdom, Nemesis was the highest-grossing arcade game of 1986 on London's Electrocoin charts.

Upon release, the arcade game received positive reviews from Computer and Video Games and Computer Gamer magazines.

=== Ports ===
The Famicom version sold over one million copies in Japan during 1986. The home computer port went to number two on the UK sales charts, below Feud. The PC Engine version also topped the UK's PC Engine sales chart in December 1991.

The first Famitsu Best Hit Game Awards gave the Famicom version of Gradius the award for Best Shooting Game and listed it as the second best Game of the Year (just below Dragon Quest). Computer and Video Games reviewed the home computer conversions and awarded it Game of the Month.

GameSpot later stated that Gradius was one of the toughest side-scrolling shooter games available on the NES, second only to Contra. IGN gave the Wii Virtual Console re-release a 7 out of 10 and has hailed it as one of the greatest classic side-scrolling shooter games.

== Legacy ==
Gradius spawned several sequels, the first of which was 1986's Salamander. The series has continued into the seventh generation with Gradius ReBirth.

In June 2020, Vic Viper was added as an easter egg unlockable cosmetic charm in the online horror game Dead by Daylight, alongside the release of the Silent Hill DLC.
