= Yuji Takenouchi =

Japanese composer and sound designer

Yuji Takenouchi 竹ノ内 裕治
- Also known as: TECHNOuchi
- Born: February 25, 1969 (age 57); Kyoto, Japan
- Genres: Ambient; techno; house; video game music
- Occupations: Composer; sound designer; musician; arranger
- Instruments: Piano; synthesizer
- Years active: 1989–present

Yuji Takenouchi (竹ノ内 裕治, Takenouchi Yūji; born February 25, 1969), also known as TECHNOuchi, is a Japanese composer, sound designer, and musician.

== Career ==
Takenouchi began his career in the game industry at Konami in 1989, which proved to be challenging as he had no formal musical training. Takenouchi wanted to compose music for the NES, but was assigned to work for PC. He composed for multiple games, most notably SD Snatcher and Metal Gear 2: Solid Snake. Takenouchi considers 1989's Space Manbow to be his best MSX-era work. Takenouchi also worked on multiple arcade games, including X-Men. He found arcade game music and sound design to offer different challenges as arcades are a crowded environment. In 1996, Takenouchi left Konami to join Sony Computer Entertainment after participating in the project "Let's Play Games" ("Game Yarouze"), which Sony hosted.

In 1996 Takenouchi composed the soundtrack for Circadia for the PlayStation, which was his first project for the platform. While unsatisfied with the final product, the soundtrack was positively received, and Takenouchi would arrange songs from the soundtrack 10 years later. In the same year, Takenouchi composed for Gekisou TomaRunner, drawing inspiration from various genres including techno, rock and roll, and baroque. In 2002, Takenouchi composed the soundtrack of ChainDive with Hideyuki Eto, who previously contributed music for Circadia and sound design for Sky Gunner. After leaving Sony, Takenouchi was approached to compose music for Ace Combat X: Skies of Deception. Takenouchi was managing a school at the time, leading to hectic schedule. He suggested Akira Yamasaki as a composer, acting as a supervisor instead. Takenouchi later joined FromSoftware, where he worked on sound design for Demon's Souls with Hideyuki Eto, marking their fourth collaboration. As Takenouchi was inexperienced with orchestral scores, he brought Shunsuke Kida to compose the soundtrack. Takenouchi would then work on sound design for the game's 2011 spiritual successor Dark Souls. Takenouchi contributed to the Monster Hunter 10th Anniversary Compilation Album, which released in October 2014. After working on sound design for Dark Souls II, Takenouchi left FromSoftware.

Takenouchi later joined Access Games, after a conversation with producer Nobuo Tomita. Takenouchi served as sound director and composer for D4: Dark Dreams Don't Die, working on sound direction from the second episode onwards. The sound team was given reference material by Hidetaka Suehiro and Hiroyuki Saegusa through existing songs from various dramas and movies. In 2016, Takenouchi left Access Games to join iNiS. A compilation of Takenouchi's three house-inspired extended plays, Brand New Day, Southern Paradise, and Parfum was released in March 2017 by Apollo Records and titled after the first EP. Takenouchi contributed to KE-TSU-I kizunajigokutachi, an arrangement album of music from Ketsui: Kizuna Jigoku Tachi, which released in August 2020. Takenouchi produced Saki Hayash's mini-album, TESTAMENT, which released on May 22, 2021.

== Works ==
Video games
Year	Title	Notes
1989	Gekitotsu Pennant Race 2	Music
1989	Space Manbow	Music with Tsuyoshi Sekito, Michiru Yamane, and Yuko Kurahashi
1990	Quarth	Music with Kazuhiko Uehara, Yasuhiko Manno, and Tomoya Tomita
1990	Nemesis	Music with Shinya Sakamoto, Michiru Yamane, and Tomoya Tomita
1990	SD Snatcher	Music with Konami Kukeiha Club
1990	Metal Gear 2: Solid Snake	Music with Konami Kukeiha Club
1991	Namachūkei 68	Music
1992	X-Men	Music with Seiichi Fukami, Junya Nakano, and Ayako Nishigaki
1992	Hexion	Music with Junya Nakano, Satoko Miyawaki, and Ayako Nishigaki
1993	Gaiapolis	Music with Seiichi Fukami and Satoko Miyawaki
1993	Mystic Warriors	Music with Junya Nakano and Inoue
1994	Polygonet Commanders	Music with Junya Nakano
1994	Golfing Greats 2	Music with Junya Nakano
1995	Crypt Killer	Music with Mutsuhiko Izumi
1995	Tokimeki Memorial Taisen Puzzledama	Music with Yoshihiko Koezuka and Kazuhiro Senoo
1996	Road Rage/Speed King	Sound effects
1999	Circadia	Music with Mayuko Kageshita, Hideyuki Eto, and Jun Chuma
1999	Gekisou TomaRunner	Music with Mayuko Kageshita, Hideyuki Eto, and Jun Chuma
2000	Gekitotsu Toma L'Arc: TomaRunner vs L'Arc-en-Ciel	Music with Mayuko Kageshita and Hideyuki Eto
2000	Kouashi Kikou Shidan: Bein Panzer	Music with Mayuko Kageshita and Hideyuki Eto
2001	Sky Gunner	Sound effects with Hideyuki Eto
2001	Mad Maestro!	Arrangements with Jun Chuma and Mayuko Kageshita
2003	ChainDive	Music with Hideyuki Eto
2006	Ace Combat X: Skies of Deception	Music supervision
2007	Another Century's Episode 3: The Final	Sound effects with various others
2009	Demon's Souls	Sound direction, Sound design
2010	Monster Hunter Diary: Poka Poka Airou Village	Music
2011	Monster Hunter Diary: Poka Poka Airou Village G	Music
2011	Dark Souls	Sound direction, Sound design, music ("A Moment's Peace")
2011	Instant Brain	Music with various others
2012	Steel Battalion: Heavy Armor	Sound design with Hideyuki Eto and Koichi Suenaga
2013	Osawari Tantei Nameko Daihanshoku	Music
2014	Dark Souls II	Sound effects with Koichi Suenaga and Kota Hoshino
2014	D4: Dark Dreams Don't Die	Sound direction, Music with MANYO, Rio Okano, and Atsushi Yamaji
2015	Galaxy Gladiator Genesis	Music with various others
2015	Project X Zone 2	Arrangements with various others
2017	Neo Heiankyo Alien	Music with various others
2018	The Missing: J.J. Macfield and the Island of Memories	Sound direction, Sound design, Music with kidlit and Keisuke Morita
2019	16Bit Rhythm Land	Music ("Silver Lining")
2020	Evangelion Battlefields	Sound direction, Sound design
2020	Touhou Genso Mahjong	Arrangements ("Tales of Far East Soul")
2021	Cotton Fantasy: Superlative Night Dreams	Arrangements ("Kingness" and "Kingness Boss")
2021	Tetote x Connect	Music ("KnockKnock" and Indicator Love")
2021	Dragon Quest Keshi Keshi!	Sound design
2022	Compass Live Arena	Arrangements
2025	Hotel Barcelona	Sound direction, Sound design, Music with various others
2025	Bounty Sisters	Sound direction, Music with Junya Nakano, Miki Higashino, and Takako Yumishima
Cancelled	Project Rap Rabbit	Sound design
