= Tomba! 2: The Evil Swine Return =

1999 video game

- North American cover art
- Developer: Whoopee Camp
- Publishers: JP: Whoopee Camp; WW: Sony Computer Entertainment
- Director: Kuniaki Kakuwa
- Producer: Tokuro Fujiwara
- Designers: Naoya Furutani; Shinya Ukawa; Tadafumi Kamioka; Toshihiko Uda
- Artist: Hiroshi Onishi
- Writer: Masayoshi Kurokawa
- Composers: Shiina Ozawa; Ashif Hakik (international version)
- Platform: PlayStation
- Release: JP: October 28, 1999; NA: January 18, 2000; EU: June 16, 2000
- Genre: Platform-adventure
- Mode: Single-player

Tomba! 2: The Evil Swine Return (Note: Known as Tombi! 2 in Europe and Tomba! The Wild Adventures (トンバ！ ザ・ワイルドアドベンチャー, Tonba! Za Wairudo Adobenchā) in Japan) is an action-adventure platform video game developed and published by Whoopee Camp for the PlayStation. The game was released in Japan in 1999 and internationally by Sony Computer Entertainment the following year. The game is a sequel to Tomba! and centers on the exploits of the eponymous feral child as he attempts to rescue his friend Tabby from an evil race of anthropomorphic pigs.

While Tomba! 2: The Evil Swine Return retains the basic game mechanics and "event" system of its predecessor, it features the additions of fully 3D environments and an assortment of collectible suits that augment Tomba's abilities. The game was received positively by critics, with particular praise going to the gameplay variety, controls, and visuals. Reception to the audio was mixed, and criticism was directed at the large number of tedious events and simplistic, repetitive boss battles. Whoopee Camp disbanded following the game's lackluster commercial performance, relegated to holding Fujiwara's assets. The game was re-released on the PlayStation Network in Japan in 2011, in Europe in 2012, and in North America in 2015. Limited Run Games released an enhanced version called Tomba 2: The Evil Swine Return Special Edition for Nintendo Switch, PlayStation 4, PlayStation 5 and Windows on December 15, 2025.

== Gameplay ==
Tomba using the Flying Squirrel Suit in the cursed Kujara Ranch

Tomba! 2: The Evil Swine Return is a side-scrolling platform-adventure game with role-playing elements. The player controls the titular character Tomba, who must defeat the Evil Pigs and rescue his girlfriend Tabby. The game is displayed in a full three-dimensional perspective in which movement is performed on predetermined linear paths. Whenever Tomba reaches a point where additional paths intersect with his current one, a set of flashing arrows appear above his head. At that point, Tomba can move in any direction that the arrows point. Some areas allow the player to explore them in an isometric view. Signposts scattered throughout the environment can be used to save the player's progress.

Along with the ability to jump, Tomba can attack enemy characters by leaping onto and biting into their back before tossing them in a straightforward trajectory. Attacking enemies in this fashion raises a magic meter on the bottom-left corner of the screen. Tomba can also attack enemies by obtaining various weapons such as flails, boomerangs and mallets. Throughout the game, different suits that can augment Tomba's abilities or protect him can be obtained. For example, the flying squirrel suit allows Tomba to glide long distances while the pig suit allows Tomba to communicate with friendly pigs. When Tomba defeats a boss character, he can wear their robe and use special powers at the cost of some magic. Magical feathers scattered throughout the game can be used to instantly transport Tomba to any area that has previously been visited.

When Tomba interacts with a certain character or environmental element, an "event" may be initiated, in which Tomba is given a task to accomplish or an obstacle to overcome. Such events may consist of finding a lost item, rescuing a stranded character or clearing a blockade in the imminent path. Upon completing an event, the player is rewarded with "Adventure Points", which can be used to unlock specifically-marked chests. The game features an inventory system that displays the player's current collection of items and events. The game includes a total of 137 events, some of which can be unlocked by importing save data from the original Tomba!.

The player begins the game with a maximum of four health points that are represented as a series of pink squares on the upper-left corner of the screen. Tomba loses a health point if he is hit by an enemy or environmental hazard. Health points can be restored by eating fruit and lunch boxes or by using other restorative items. When all health points are depleted or if Tomba falls down a bottomless chasm, the game ends prematurely.

== Plot ==
Tomba – having grown into a young man since his previous adventure – receives an envelope containing his insect friend Zippo, who reports that the Evil Pigs have invaded a neighboring land and that Tomba's friend Tabby has disappeared. Tomba leaps into the sea in search of her and winds up in a fisherman village where he meets an old man named Kainen. From there he moves on to the Coal-Mining Town where Tabby's house is, but discovers that she is absent. Gran, a denizen of the Coal-Mining Town, mentions seeing Tabby travel to the Kujara Ranch by trolley, but the trolley she used to travel there returns empty. A panicking trolley worker reveals that the Evil Pigs kidnapped Tabby when she tried to protect a pendant that was given to her by Tomba as a gift. Gran explains that the Evil Pigs have cursed the entire continent, and gives Tomba a red Pig Bag that is capable of capturing the Flame Pig that has cast his spell on the mines. Tomba ventures throughout the continent gathering the rest of the Pig Bags. After Tomba captures the five Evil Pigs and lifts their spells over the land, their leader, the Last Evil Pig, reveals himself to Tomba and tempts him to find his lair. Tomba locates the Last Evil Pig in an underground area underneath the Coal-Mining Town, where the Last Evil Pig freezes time in a last-ditch effort to stop Tomba. A final battle against the Last Evil Pig ends with his capture, but he promises his eventual return. Tomba finds Tabby in the Last Evil Pig's lair and they escape the collapsing area on the back of the flying dog Baron. Following a feast at Tabby's home, Kainen may appear and reward Tomba with a tuxedo if all the events were completed. Tomba is allowed to pilot the local windmill owner's new boat to return home, but he crashes it soon after departing.

== Development and release ==
For Tomba! 2 The Evil Swine Return, Whoopee Camp founder Tokuro Fujiwara transferred directorial duty to Kuniaki Kakuwa, but retained his other positions in development. A fully polygonal approach was applied to the game's graphics to achieve a greater freedom in expression. This shift to three-dimensional graphics allowed for concepts that were not possible in the previous title, such as dynamic camera movement during cutscenes. Despite the change in graphics, the first game's basic systems and gameplay were preserved as to not alienate players of the previous title. Hidetaka Suehiro provided level design for the latter half of the game and set up the AI movement for the enemy characters. The music was composed by Shiina Ozawa, with a new score by Ashif Hakik being recorded for the international version. The Japanese-language version includes the voice talents of Ichirō Nagai, Satomi Kōrogi and Yuki Matsuoka among others. The game was publicly unveiled by Sony at E3 1999, and was released in Japan on October 28, 1999.

The game's introduction video in the Western releases was edited from the original Japanese version, and features different background music. The English-language voices were provided by the Actors Phantasy Company. The North American release date for the game was announced by Sony on November 11, 1999. A playable demonstration was integrated into the Jampack Summer 2K compilation CD released by PlayStation Underground. Tomba! 2 was released in North America on January 18, 2000 and in Europe on June 16, 2000. The game sold less copies than its predecessor, and Whoopee Camp was disbanded following its release, with much of its staff later transferring to Access Games. The company had been developing the PlayStation 2 title Extermination prior to its dissolution.

When an English-language distribution deal for Tomba! on the PlayStation Network was formulated between MonkeyPaw Games, Sony and Fujiwara, the involved parties elected to wait until Tomba!'s re-release showed satisfactory sales figures before arranging the sequel's re-release. Tomba! 2 was re-released on the PlayStation Network in Japan on September 28, 2011, in Europe on December 29, 2012, and in North America on February 18, 2014. Tomba! 2's initial release on the North American PlayStation Network was that of the Japanese version; MonkeyPaw Games experienced emulation issues with the English-language version that prevented its immediate release and intended the Japanese version to be a placeholder. The English-language version of the game was released on the PlayStation Network in North America on November 5, 2015. From November 3 to November 9, those who were verified to have purchased the Japanese version were able to download the English version at no extra charge. To commemorate the release of the English version, MonkeyPaw Games created and distributed limited-edition Tomba plushie figures as part of a special promotion on Twitter from November 3 to December 25, 2015.

On June 20, 2024, Limited Run Games announced that a re-release of Tomba! 2: The Evil Swine Return is in development for the Nintendo Switch, PlayStation 4, PlayStation 5 and Windows with a planned 2025 release date.

== Reception ==
Reception

Aggregate score
Aggregator	Score
GameRankings	83%

Review scores
Publication	Score
AllGame	4/5
CNET Gamecenter	9/10
Electronic Gaming Monthly	7.875/10 (Note: Three critics of Electronic Gaming Monthly gave the game each a score of 8/10, and the other gave it 7.5/10.)
EP Daily	8/10
Famitsu	31/40
Game Informer	8.75/10
GameFan	(T.R.) 96% (R.M.) 89% 86% (Note: In GameFan's viewpoint of the game, three critics gave it each a score of 83, 78, and 96.)
GameRevolution	B
GameSpot	8.4/10
IGN	9/10
Next Generation	4/5
Official U.S. PlayStation Magazine	4/5

Tomba! 2: The Evil Swine Return received favorable reviews according to the review aggregation website GameRankings. In Japan, Famitsu gave it a score of 31 out of 40.

While Jeremy Conrad of IGN declared the game to be an improvement over its predecessor, Sean Johnson of GameRevolution and Peter Bartholow of GameSpot deemed it as merely a polished repackaging. The quantity and variety of events was noted, and Randy Nelson of NextGen added that the major events were better paced than those in the first game. Some, however, felt that a number of the events were tedious and time-consuming; Mark MacDonald of Official U.S. PlayStation Magazine commented that "the errands outnumber the interesting puzzles by about 20 to one", and stated a preference for the game's platforming sections. Slo Mo of GamePro (Note: GamePro gave the game 5/5 for graphics, 4/5 for sound, and two 4.5/5 scores for control and fun factor.) and Che Chou of Electronic Gaming Monthly opined that the game's challenge would be appealing to both young and mature audiences, though Shawn Smith and Chris Johnston, also of Electronic Gaming Monthly, perceived a lack of difficulty. Bartholow and Conrad remarked that some of the optional events were frustratingly difficult, with Conrad specifying the mine cart minigame as an example. Erik Engström of Hardcore Gaming 101 was disappointed by the game's more linear structure compared to the first game, but considered the quest system's organization to be more refined. The controls were commended for their responsiveness, though the multi-branched paths were said to be somewhat cumbersome to navigate. While Johnson acknowledged that this gameplay style was an interesting diversion from other action games, he and Nelson proposed that full 3D movement would have made the controls and gameplay simpler and more enjoyable. Conrad disagreed, saying that the Tomba! property's 16-bit-styled gameplay was an essential part of its charm. Bartholow commended the camera and perspectives as excellent, but he and Johnson faulted a few areas where the perspective made placing jumps or finding event-related clues difficult. The variety of items and weapons was appreciated, with Johnson considering the suits to be the game's best addition. The boss battles were criticized for their simplicity and repetitiveness. Engström negatively compared the presence of the character Zippo – who gives hints and directions pertaining to the situation – to Navi from The Legend of Zelda: Ocarina of Time, deeming him unnecessary and insulting to the player's intelligence.

The graphics were praised for their color, detail, and increased sense of size and depth over the first game; Johnson and Bartholow declared it to be one of the PlayStation's best-looking games, and both compared the visuals to a cartoon. Engström argued that the graphics were messier than those of its predecessor, though he still considered them decent for a PlayStation game and appreciated the preservation of the first game's "silly" aesthetic. Reactions to the music were mixed. Slo Mo praised the score for its atmosphere, and Engström singled out the music in the hidden magical towers as "tense and mysterious, almost a bit oppressive". Johnson and Conrad regarded the music as passable if fairly generic, though Conrad was annoyed by the "monotonous" music that plays during character conversations. Bartholow noted that the North American version's music "retains the reggae-ish timbre of the original title's music, but for the most part it isn't as repetitive or potentially annoying as the original's music". The voice-acting also saw mixed responses. Johnson and Bartholow were surprised by the competent quality of the voices, and Bartholow added that the localization was clean and complete. Conrad's assessment was middling, concluding "It's not Resident Evil (1) bad, but it still can't touch Metal Gear Solid". Smith, Engström, and Jay Fitzloff of Game Informer were more dismissive, with Engström and Smith respectively deriding the voice-overs as "amateurish" and "ridiculously lame", and Engström deemed Charles to be the most grating. Engström observed that the game's tone was slightly darker than its predecessor, citing the rotten appearance of the Evil Ghost Pig, the nuanced depiction of a benevolent group of pigs, and the "actually rather scary" endgame.
