= Gaiapolis =

1993 video game

- Promotional flyer art by Akihiro Yamada
- Developer: Konami
- Publisher: Konami
- Director: Hiroyuki Ashida
- Designer: Shūjirō Hamakawa
- Programmers: Hideo Shiozaki; Tadasu Kitae; Tomohiro Ishimoto
- Artists: Shūjirō Hamakawa; Yasuhiro Noguchi
- Writer: Tadasu Kitae
- Composers: Satoko Miyawaki; Seiichi Fukami; Yuji Takenouchi
- Platform: Arcade
- Release: JP: April 1993
- Genre: Action role-playing
- Modes: Single-player, multiplayer

Gaiapolis (Note: Japanese: ガイアポリス -黄金鷹の剣-, Hepburn: Gaiaporisu: Ōgon Taka no Tsurugi; lit. 'Gaiapolis: Sword of the Golden Hawk') is a 1993 action role-playing video game developed and released for arcades by Konami. The plot follows prince Gerard Himerce, whose country was destroyed by Mordred, an evil god summoned by the king Darkness of the Zah Harc empire. Gerard embarks on an adventure joined by the half-fairy Elaine Shee and the dragon archduke Galahad to exact revenge. Throughout the journey, the player explores searching for keys and items, fighting enemies and bosses to increase the character's attributes.

Gaiapolis was created by the arcade division at Konami, in conjunction with Lethal Enforcers and Mystic Warriors. It was directed by Hiroyuki Ashida, who previously worked on Gradius II and Detana!! TwinBee. Animator Shūjirō Hamakawa, who also worked on Detana!! TwinBee, served as planner and character designer. Music and sound were produced by Satoko Miyawaki, Seiichi Fukami, and Yuji Takenouchi. The game was supplemented with a manga adaptation by Hamakawa and a two-CD album from King Records.

Gaiapolis proved popular among Japanese arcade players, receiving several awards from Gamest and Micom BASIC Magazine. Gaming publications praised the game for its audiovisual presentation, multiplayer, and password feature. Some publications considered its playstyle was more reserved for consoles, while others were divided regarding the story. It never received an official home conversion, however, Sachen developed and published an unlicensed port for the Famicom in 1994. The character of Elaine would later appear in other Konami titles. Retrospective commentary for the game has been generally favorable.

== Gameplay ==
The fairy Elaine Shee, followed by the mercenary beast Rollin, fighting enemies at Gaiapolis

Gaiapolis is an action role-playing game played from a overhead view. The story follows prince Gerard Himerce, whose country of Avalon was destroyed by Mordred, an evil god summoned by the king Darkness of the Zah Harc empire. Determined to exact revenge, Gerard embarks on a journey accompanied by Elaine Shee, a half-fairy and last survivor of the Shee fairy clan, and Galahad, a wingless dragon archduke exiled from the dragon kingdom. The party meets a fire warrior, who tells them about three keys to open the path that leads to Gaiapolis, the tower where Darkness resides. (Note: Attributed to multiple references:)

The player can choose one of three characters, each with their own unique weapon, advantages and disadvantages: Gerard and Galahad are sword-wielding warriors, while Elaine is a tonfa-wielding martial artist. Gerard is average but has high attack power; Elaine is weak but fast in close combat; and Galahad is slow but has great durability. The player fights enemies by performing normal or consecutive attacks with the weapon. Using consecutive attacks can potentially land a critical hit on the enemy. Characters can also perform a spin attack, a dash attack, and block enemy projectiles. Defeating enemies grants experience to fill a level gauge. When filled, the character levels up and receives a health boost. Characters can reach a maximum level of 30.

Breaking crates and other objects reveals various items. These include weapons and shields that increase the player's offensive and defensive attributes, treasures and books that grant experience, food that replenishes health, eggs, and crystals. Picking up an egg spawns one of three mercenary beasts, one for each character: Goblin the soldier (blue), Rollin the armadillo (brown), and Garuda the dragon (purple). The beasts follow the character and can be ordered to attack enemies, but they take damage and eventually die. Each beast can be recalled to automatically restore its own health. Obtaining crystals allows the player to use one-time magic attack spells, and collecting more increases the magic level.

The player can take damage from an enemy attack and the game is over when they lose all health or the stage boss is not defeated in time. The game features a continue option and a password function: a password is displayed when the game is over. Entering the password correctly allows the player to resume from the last stage reached. The player goes through 16 stages, some of which consist solely of a boss fight for the three keys. Completing a stage grants the player additional experience depending on the time limit. In Maharishi, a path to Koben opens if the player reaches level 12 or higher, obtains three statues hidden in certain spots, and destroys a shrine to obtain an item. If the conditions are not met, the player goes to Neomosc to obtain a weapon, or to Blancmute if their level is below 12.

== Development ==
Shūjirō Hamakawa was responsible for most of the graphic design for Gaiapolis, including the in-game character illustrations

Gaiapolis was developed by the arcade division at Konami. The game was directed by Hiroyuki "A.C.D." Ashida, who previously worked on Gradius II and Detana!! TwinBee. Both the plot and story were written by Tadasu "Tadasuke" Kitae, who also served as co-programmer along with Hideo "Hides" Shiozaki and Tomohiro "Tom" Ishimoto. Animator Shūjirō Hamakawa (credited under the pseudonym Shuzilow.Ha) served as planner and character designer under the direction of Yasuhiro "Idaten" Noguchi. Hamakawa had previously worked on Konami titles such as Crime Fighters and Detana!! TwinBee.

Hamakawa was responsible for eighty percent of the graphic design for Gaiapolis, including in-game and ending illustrations. He revealed that Darkness was inspired by The Kurgan from Highlander. A second quest was planned to begin after defeating Darkness and reaching the throne. It would involve facing a fallen character, whose strength would depend on the player's previous level. According to Hamakawa, it was discarded due to its prolonged playtime. Light and dark weapons were also planned: light weapons would reform enemies, while dark weapons, with their high attack power, would corrode them. Hamakawa stated that these weapons were scrapped due to the difficulty of explaining their system in an arcade game. The promotional flyer was illustrated by Akihiro Yamada.

=== Music ===
The game's music and sound were produced by Satoko "Fairy" Miyawaki, Seiichi "Prophet" Fukami and Yuji Takenouchi (under the alias "Technouchi") respectively. Fukami was responsible for the music in Gradius III, while Takenouchi had participated in X-Men (1992). Miyawaki stated that Gaiapolis was created in conjunction with Lethal Enforcers and Mystic Warriors, with all their desks and instruments lined up to each other. Fukami was responsible for the game's soundtrack, which included orchestral, ethnic, and cinematic music. He commented that development proved to be long and found it difficult managing the number of compositions he was working on, losing track of details as he approached the total of 40 songs. Miyawaki said she would look at her co-workers' drawings and songs when having a writer's block. She mentioned that Kenichiro Fukui would request their help with tracks for Lethal Enforcers, when Takenouichi was occasionally humming a tune when thinking over new ideas during lunchtime.

A two-CD album titled Konami Amusement Sounds '93...Natsu was distributed in Japan by King Records on August 21, 1993. It contained the original soundtracks for Gaiapolis, Lethal Enforcers, and Mystic Warriors, as well as arrangements by Fukami and Tappi Iwase. In 1998, the tracks arranged by Fukami were later included as part of Kukeiha Club & Konami Kukeiha Club Best Vol.2, a compilation album distributed by King Records. In 2024, a two-CD album titled Gaiapolis Game Sound Digital Collection was released under City Connection's Clarice Disk label, containing the game's original soundtrack and arrangements by Takenouchi.

== Release ==
Gaiapolis was first showcased at the 1993 AOU Show. The game was also shown at the 1993 American Coin Machine Exposition (ACME). It was released for arcades by Konami in Japan in April 1993. The game remains exclusive to arcades and never received a contemporary official conversion for a home console. An unlicensed port for the Famicom was developed and published by Sachen in 1994.

== Reception ==
Reception

Awards
Publication	Award
Gamest (1993)	Grand Prize 9th, Best Action Award 4th, Best Graphics Award 8th, Best VGM Award 7th, Best Production Award 3rd, Annual Hit Game 38th
Micom BASIC Magazine (1993)	Best Action 8th, Best Graphics 9th, Best Sound Effects 9th, Best Production 2nd

In Japan, Game Machine listed Gaiapolis on their June 1, 1993 issue as being the tenth most-popular arcade game for the previous two weeks. Monthly Coin Journal ranked the game as the twelfth highest-grossing arcade machine in Japan, based on a June 1993 arcade operator survey.

French publication Joypad found the inclusion of a password system innovative for the arcade scene, but noted that the game's mix of action and adventure playstyles was more reserved for consoles. Ação Games considered it an odd game from Konami, but commended its password feature and multiplayer mode. Gamest praised the game's audiovisual presentation but criticized its uninteresting story and direction, noting that fighting enemies with the same combat actions felt monotonous. Famitsu highlighted the game's graphics, particularly the backgrounds and player characters, and well-crafted worldview. Japanese publication Game You II was impressed by the game's visuals and considered the plot to be solid.

Gamest gave Gaiapolis multiple awards at the seventh annual "Gamest Awards", placing 9th in the "Grand Prize", 4th in the "Best Action Award", 8th in the "Best Graphics Award", 7th in the "Best VGM Award", 3rd in the "Best Production Award", and 38th in the "Annual Hit Game". In the third edition of their Gal's Island series, Gamest commented on the character of Elaine Shee, highlighting her silk armor and finding her ears adorable, though they felt her use of tonfas was unusual. They also stated that while she was planier than other female characters, that was not a bad thing. Japanese publication Micom BASIC Magazine also gave the game several awards at the 1993 "Video Game Grand Prize", placing 8th in "Best Action", 9th in "Best Graphics" and "Best Sound Effects", and 2nd in "Best Production".

Retrospective commentary for Gaiapolis has been generally favorable. Sega-16's Ken Horowitz praised the game's Dungeons & Dragons-style hack and slash gameplay, character designs, and colorful visuals, but expressed disappointment at the lack of a home release, writing that "this one would have been right at home on the 32X". MeriStation's José Manuel Fernández described it as a novel action role-playing game. Retro Gamer commended the game's high-quality production, remarking that its graphics were among the best of its time, but questioned the lack of a home port, stating that it would have made a good release for the PlayStation and Sega Saturn. Revista PlayReplay's Eidy Tasaka was surprised by its vertical-oriented display, commenting that it was a risky and "successful" move by Konami to make the game more interesting. Hardcore Gaming 101's Robert Naytor regarded it as "the most original of Konami's arcade brawlers", but compared it unfavorably to Capcom's Dungeons & Dragons games.

== Legacy ==
A one-shot manga adaptation, written and illustrated by Shūjirō Hamakawa, was published in the August 1993 issue of Shinseisha's Comic Gamest manga anthology. The character of Elaine Shee would later make appearances outside of Gaiapolis in other Konami titles; Elaine appears as an unlockable playable character in the fighting game Battle Tryst (1998).
