= The Good Life (video game) =

2021 video game

- Developers: White Owls Inc.; Grounding
- Publisher: Playism
- Directors: Hidetaka Suehiro; Yukio Futatsugi; Takayuki Isobe
- Artist: Wataru Nishide
- Writers: Masatoshi Tokuoka; Kokonoe Tohno; Milli-Gram; Hidetaka Suehiro
- Platforms: Microsoft Windows; Xbox One; Nintendo Switch; PlayStation 4
- Release: 15 October 2021
- Genre: Role-playing
- Mode: Single-player

The Good Life is a role-playing video game developed by Japanese studio White Owls Inc. and published by Playism for Microsoft Windows, Xbox One, Nintendo Switch and PlayStation 4, and released on 15 October 2021.

== Gameplay ==
The Good Life revolves around Naomi Hayward, a journalist from New York. After accumulating a debt of £30 million, she is sent to investigate Rainy Woods, a small village in the north of England. Its population is able to transform into cats and dogs. Naomi learns this ability too. The player must take photographs of various things and upload them on the Internet in order to make money, and is given many side quests to complete, in addition to the main quest.

== Development and release ==
The game was developed by Japanese studio White Owls, and the project was led by Hidetaka Suehiro, the director of Deadly Premonition who wanted to show "the great things about British culture", and Yukio Futatsugi, the creator of the Panzer Dragoon series. The studio launched a failed crowdfunding campaign on Fig, though a subsequent crowdfunding campaign via Kickstarter was successful. While the game was originally set to be published by The Irregular Corporation, Playism announced that it had taken over publishing duties in June 2021. While the game was initially set to be released in 2019, it was delayed several times. The game was released for Microsoft Windows, Xbox One, Nintendo Switch, and PlayStation 4 on October 15, 2021.

== Reception ==
The game received "mixed or average reviews" upon release according to review aggregator Metacritic.
