= Deadly Premonition =

2010 open world survival horror video game

- North American cover art
- Developers: Access Games; Gevo Entertainment (PS3, PC, NS)
- Publishers: NA: Ignition Entertainment; JP: Marvelous Entertainment; EU: Rising Star Games; WW: Rising Star Games (PS3, PC); NA: Aksys Games (NS); PAL: Numskull Games (NS)
- Director: Hidetaka Suehiro
- Producers: Tomio Kanazawa; Kuniaki Kakuwa
- Designer: Hidetaka Suehiro
- Programmer: Hideki Kataoka
- Artist: Hitoshi Okamoto
- Writers: Hidetaka Suehiro; Kenji Goda
- Composers: Riyou Kinugasa; Takuya Kobayashi; Hiromi Mizutani
- Platforms: Xbox 360; PlayStation 3; Microsoft Windows; Nintendo Switch
- Release: February 23, 2010: Xbox 360; NA: February 23, 2010; JP: March 11, 2010; EU: October 29, 2010 PlayStation 3; JP: March 11, 2010; NA: April 30, 2013; EU: April 30, 2013; AU: May 16, 2013 Microsoft Windows; WW: October 29, 2013 Nintendo Switch; NA: September 4, 2019; JP: September 5, 2019; EU: September 5, 2019
- Genre: Survival horror
- Mode: Single-player

Deadly Premonition (Note: Known as Red Seeds Profile (レッドシーズプロファイル, Reddo Shīzu Purofairu) in Japan) is a 2010 open world survival horror video game developed by Access Games. Set in the fictional rural American town of Greenvale, Washington, the story follows FBI Special Agent Francis York Morgan as he investigates the murder of an eighteen-year-old woman, which bears similarities to a series of murders across the country. Deadly Premonition was originally released in February 2010 for Xbox 360 and in March 2010 for PlayStation 3; the Xbox 360 version was published by Ignition Entertainment in North America, Marvelous Entertainment in Japan, and Rising Star Games in Europe. Marvelous Entertainment released the PlayStation 3 version exclusively in Japan. A director's cut edition for PlayStation 3 and Microsoft Windows was released worldwide by Rising Star Games in 2013. A port for the Nintendo Switch, Deadly Premonition: Origins, followed in 2019.

Deadly Premonition is a reboot of Access Games' earlier video game Rainy Woods. In production from September 2004 to October 2007, Rainy Woods was cancelled soon after its debut at the 2007 Tokyo Game Show due to technical issues. Deadly Premonition combined its assets with a new game scenario and protagonist, Francis York Morgan. Gameplay is divided into York's detective investigation into Greenvale and its inhabitants, and supernatural combat sequences in which York must battle or evade otherworldly beings. Development on Deadly Premonition's setting was guided by an intention to imbue the game with a sense of realism: the non-player characters follow an individualized 24-hour schedule, and the scale of Greenvale is intended to replicate that of a rural American town. Issues with memory allocation, various lighting and shadow aspects, and the physics engine PhysX were faced during development.

Deadly Premonition received wildly varying critical reviews and holds the Guinness World Record for the most critically polarizing survival horror game. Although the original release had not been commercially successful, Deadly Premonition has garnered a cult following and has been cited as an example of games as art. A sequel, Deadly Premonition 2: A Blessing in Disguise, was released in 2020.

== Gameplay ==
In this screenshot of the director's cut, York (center) stands in the rain near the police station, which is open. A map of the town relative to York's position is in the lower left, while his health and sleepiness/heartbeat bars are in the upper left corner; in the lower right corner is text that makes note of which weapon is equipped.

Deadly Premonition is a survival horror game set in an open world environment and played from an over-the shoulder third-person perspective. The game's objective is to guide the player character, FBI Special Agent Francis York Morgan, as he investigates the identity of the Raincoat Killer, who is responsible for a murder in the rural town of Greenvale. York receives in-game money for numerous actions—both for finishing levels and for minor events, such as shaving his beard or changing suits; he can also be fined for poor performance, such as wearing a filthy outfit, which attracts flies. Additionally, he requires food and sleep at regular intervals, as indicated by the gauges measuring his hunger and neediness for sleep. If his gauge for sleepiness reaches zero, he will become hungry far more quickly and his heartbeat gauge will increase much faster when running; if his gauge for hunger depletes, he will begin to lose health until he dies. Sleeping restores his health and tiredness, while food and items used to ward off sleepiness, such as coffee, can be purchased from stores in Greenvale.

York may explore Greenvale on foot, by car, or by using a special item which can be obtained by completing a sidequest. Cars must be maintained, as they consume fuel, which York must purchase, and accumulate damage that eventually renders them useless unless York pays for their repair. York often has a specific time frame for investigating sites and interviewing non-player characters; however, if he misses the timeslot, the player may simply try again during the next day without a penalty. Places of business and entertainment venues in Greenvale have specific hours of operation and must be visited at the proper time to make use of their services. Non-player characters also have their own specific routines and travel around town as they go about their business. It also features a dynamic weather system and day-night cycle which affects the responses of the non-player characters. If York engages one at the right place and time of day, he or she may offer him a side-quest to perform for additional rewards. In addition to side-quests, trading cards are scattered throughout the town, which the player can collect while exploring. York can also participate in mini-games, such as darts, racing through checkpoints, and fishing, and may accelerate the passing of time by smoking cigarettes.

Deadly Premonition contains several combat sequences, in which York encounters supernatural enemies while trapped in the Other World. York may battle them using melee weapons or firearms, or may choose to evade them by holding his breath. Melee weapons will eventually break with continued use, and York's pulse increases whenever he runs or holds his breath. Periodically, York encounters the Raincoat Killer, which will activate either a quick time event, a chase sequence, or a hiding event necessary to escape the murderer. During the Other World sequences, York's primary objective is to investigate crimes that took place there in the recent past. He collects photos of evidence to use to "profile" the scene and reconstruct events that took place with his deductive skills. Furthermore, the Other World regularly affects the entire town, excepting the interior of buildings, from midnight to six in the morning.

== Synopsis ==
=== Setting ===
Deadly Premonition is set in the world in which good and evil are spread by the messengers influenced by the Forest and Red Tree respectively. Contrasting pairs play a role in the game, such as "good and evil, reality and abnormality, earthly life and eternal life, day and night, criminals and victims, the forest and the red tree, and twins and dual personalities". Throughout the game, the protagonist, Francis York Morgan (Jeff Kramer), periodically visits two supernatural rooms: the White Room and the Red Room. The White Room represents a normal subconscious, while the Red Room represents one influenced by evil.

=== Plot ===
FBI Special Agent Francis York Morgan investigates the murder of 18-year-old Anna Graham (Melissa Hutchison) in the rural town of Greenvale, Washington, in the United States. He takes on the case due to the manner of the killing: a ritualistic murder of a young woman where red seeds have been found on or near the body, similar to a series of other murders across the United States. York generates considerable friction with his dismissive attitude toward the locals, bizarre demeanor, and tendency to interrupt conversations to deliver asides to an unseen person referred to as "Zach". He is assisted by the town's sheriff George Woodman (Casey Robertson), who is scarred by a past of childhood abuse; the deputy sheriff Emily Wyatt (Rebecca Wink), who becomes a love interest for York; and Thomas MacLaine (Christopher Sullivan), George's meek assistant. Additionally, York finds himself regularly ambushed and attacked by the Raincoat Killer, who, according to the folklore of the town, kills only when it rains.

As the investigation continues, Anna's close friend Becky Ames (Amy Provenzano) and Diane (Christiane Crawford), Becky's elder sister and art gallery owner, are murdered in a similar fashion, with a mark placed nearby that York believes to be a peace symbol upside-down. He learns that the trees producing the red seeds grow in Greenvale and that there are two Raincoat Killers. The original one, who inspired the folklore, went on a killing spree after the United States military released gas made from the red seeds into the town in 1956, causing the residents to temporarily experience an uncontrollable, murderous rage. The second, the New Raincoat Killer, hopes to gain immortality by consuming the red seeds and murdering four people, who have also been forced to eat the seeds.

When Thomas abruptly disappears, York suspects his involvement in the crimes, a hunch that is confirmed when Thomas kidnaps him. While tied up, York realizes his romantic feelings for Emily, who searches for him with Forrest Kaysen (Doug Boyd), a traveling tree salesman. It is also revealed that Anna, Becky, Thomas, and his younger sister Carol all belonged to a secret sex club created by George; jealous of George's romantic interest in Emily, Thomas draws her into a physical confrontation with him and dies when he falls on a hook. York, now rescued, reveals that he believes the copycat raincoat killer is George.

Emily and York find the final victim, Carol; before dying, Carol attacks Emily out of jealousy as well and forces her to ingest some of the red seeds, which sickens her to the point of unconsciousness. York leaves Emily in Kaysen's care to confront George. George confesses to being the murderer and has gained shape-shifting powers as the result of eating the red seeds; in the ensuing fight, York kills him.

Afterward, York realizes that, while George was the Greenvale killer, he could not have been responsible for the other similar murders nationwide and was likely just a pawn. He eventually discovers that Kaysen is responsible and that the symbol seen close to all the victims was a tree. York finds that Kaysen has planted a tree inside Emily's stomach, and the sight causes him to recover his repressed memories: as a child, Zach witnessed his mother (Rebecca Wink) dying with a tree sprouting from her body, with his father (David Rosenthal) and Kaysen in the room. His father was unable to kill her out of mercy, leading to a more agonising death for her, and then he killed himself. Unable to cope with the trauma, Zach psychologically switched places with his newly created other personality, York. Though unable to save Emily, Zach kills Kaysen, revealed to be a supernatural entity from the Red World and messenger of the Red Tree, and leaves the town with optimism for his future.

In the closing scene, the spirits of York, Emily, Thomas, and the Greenvale murder victims are seen happily residing in a parallel plane of existence.

== Development ==
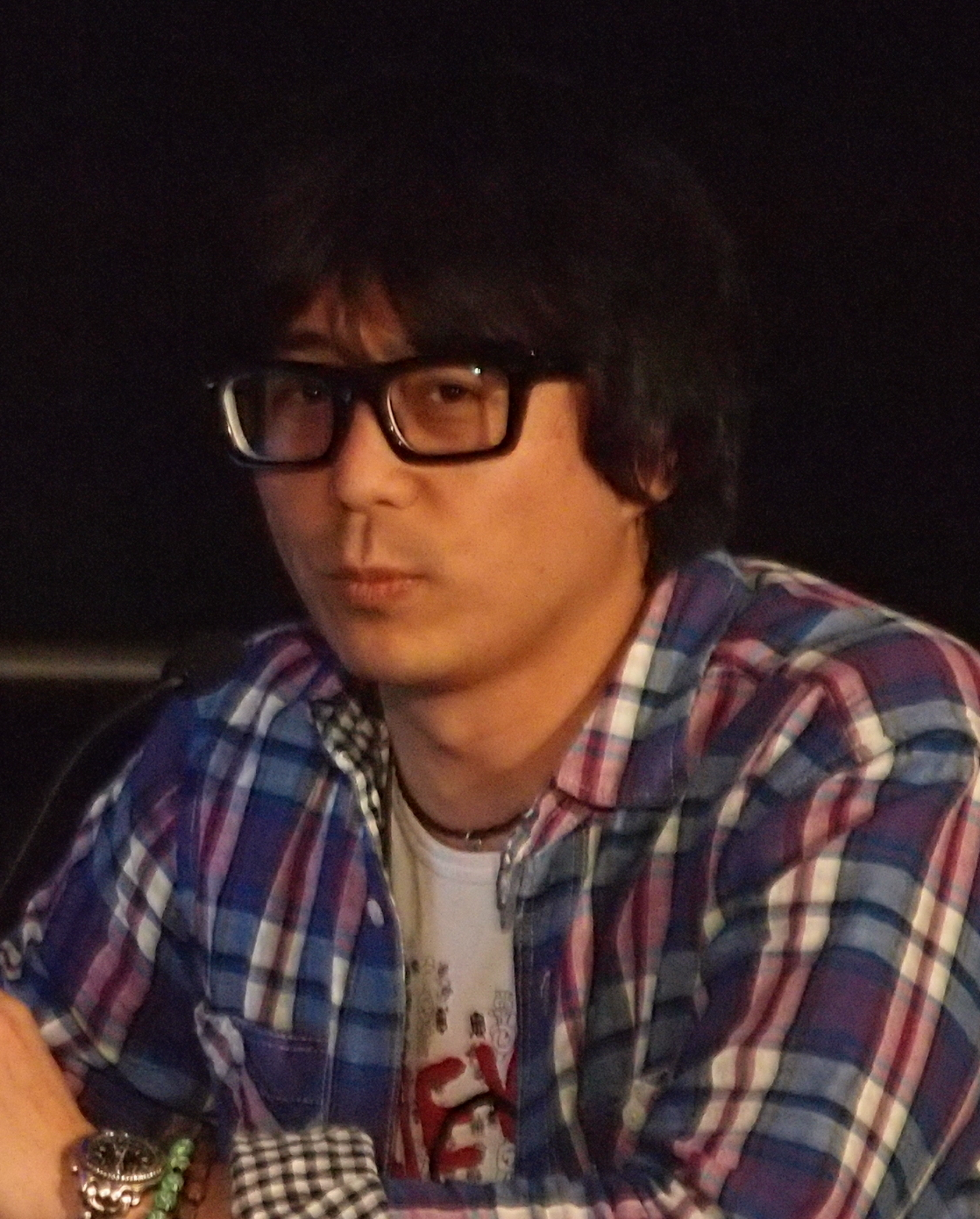
Hidetaka Suehiro, lead director and writer, in 2011

As I said, the original concept of this game is, 'living in and feeling part of the town'. Even if the player is an efficient FBI agent, he will also become hungry, sleepy, and stinky if he didn't bathe at all. This doesn't change even if zombies appear in the town or even if serial murders occur. It also means we are not perfect, just human. I wanted to bring reality into the game using those factors.

— Director Hidetaka "Swery" Suehiro

Deadly Premonition originates from Rainy Woods, a game that Access Games began work on in fall 2004. A design document was produced in September 2004, followed by the project's start in March 2005. The prototype was assessed in October, as was an alpha iteration in March 2006. A trailer for Rainy Woods debuted in September 2007, promoting the title as a multi-platform game for the PlayStation 3 and Xbox 360 consoles during the Tokyo Game Show; it featured the "young and very cynical" FBI Special Agent David Young Henning as its protagonist. Several video game journalists noted that the title shared strong similarities with the American supernatural television series Twin Peaks. Rainy Woods was cancelled soon after its debut, due to considerable "technological difficulties" with the two platforms' hardware, including memory allocation and lighting.

In 2008, Suehiro began work on Deadly Premonition, which was intended to be a reboot of Rainy Woods, combining the assets from Rainy Woods with a new scenario and game design. In March 2009, the project started, although it would face cancellation four times. Access Games also began simultaneous development on Lord of Arcana, which would be released in October 2010. The budget for the overall project, according to Suehiro, was "[n]ot very much". Suehiro created a new protagonist, Francis York Morgan, with help from his friends in the United States, and he and Kenji Gota, an independent film director, created York's dialogue with his split personality, Zach. As Gota and Suehiro are good friends and often have conversations about film, Suehiro tried to imbue the dialogue with that atmosphere. Additionally, they wrote the main plotline, while Suehiro wrote eighty percent of the sidequests and all of York's conversations with the nonplayer characters. The character Zach was intended to involve the player emotionally in the game by providing the sense that York was directly addressing and conversing with the player in his asides.

A central focus of the gameplay is freedom for the player, as Suehiro had wanted to create a game that players could progress at their own speed. He had planned to incorporate two more mini-games involving chess and perfume, and had considered having the player character's weight and hair length fluctuate. Additionally, the combat sections of Deadly Premonition were added last in development, after a publisher worried that the game would not sell well in the West without it. Aspects of the game were initially more violent as well, as a way to express a fear of death; for example, the second victim was intended to be disemboweled while still living. However, the scenes were later toned down, as Suehiro felt that they were "too extreme".

Suehiro's guiding concepts for the game's setting focused on "real time, real scale, and real life". The developers traveled to the United States and noted the width measurements of the various billboards, railroad crossings, and roads to create a sense of realism for the town; the angles of the sun and weather patterns were also calculated. To add to that sense of realism, every street in Greenvale is named, and an hourly wage was decided on for a local diner. Additionally, the daily schedules of the non-player characters were created from their detailed background profiles.

Areas of difficulties in the game's development were memory allocation, various lighting and shadow aspects, and their use of the physics engine PhysX. According to Wataru Nishide, the lead level artist, and J's Kataoka, the lead programmer, the team's data management had been "sloppy" due to their initial amazement at the amount of RAM that the next-generation consoles provided. The team found a balance between the practicalities of the available memory with the desired aesthetic of the outdoor sections of the game, which initially contained too many objects. The developers also had difficulties with balancing the game's lighting, desired aesthetics of the game's shadows and the processing rate. Furthermore, their use of PhysX proved to have mixed results; the developers enjoyed the "dynamic expression" that it gave the game's world, but had problems with the inability to "cheat" the "brutally honest" simulation and the resulting toll on the frame rate and processing. The team also had to cut back on the number of objects run in the PhysX engine, which initially included hair, clothing, and fishing rods among others, to preserve the frame rate.

=== Audio ===
Riyou Kinugasa, Takuya Kobayashi, and Hiromi Mizutani composed the soundtrack for Deadly Premonition. In his retrospective on Deadly Premonition, the lead planner Keiji Teranishi considered its soundtrack a strength, helping to add depth to the game's world and characters. He credited this partially to efforts in working with the composers to "appreciate the unique aesthetic" of the game's world. This included humming ideas for songs, using concept designs, and playing music with a similar feel. "Life is Beautiful", which uses whistling to evoke a calm walk in the countryside, was easily composed, along with "York and Zach", which appears during York's monologues. "Miss Stilletto Heels", the second theme of the game, and "Red Tree", a song meant to symbolize madness, proved more difficult to create, particularly its improvisation section. The sound effects were outsourced to another company, as Access Games lacked a department to deal with the sound.

Voice recording took place at WebTone Studio in San Jose, California (WebTone later moved to Los Angeles). Six thousand lines of dialogue were recorded over two weeks, about half of which were lines for York's voice actor, Jeff Kramer. Before recording, the voice actors were provided with character biographies and concept art. Teranishi recalled directing the voice recording as "quite a task", and Suehiro sometimes acted out the lines himself to show what he wanted conveyed. Teranishi was particularly pleased with Kramer's performance as York, remarking that he "brought even greater depth and style to the lead role than Access Games had envisioned".

== Release ==
Deadly Premonition was published for the Xbox 360 by Ignition Entertainment in North America, priced within the budget range, on February 23, 2010; by Marvelous Entertainment in Japan on March 11, and by Rising Star Games in Europe on October 29. In Japan, the game was also simultaneously released for the PlayStation 3. Additionally, Rising Star decided to forgo an Australian release, as a result of what it cited as "classification concerns". In 2017, Deadly Premonition was made compatible with the Xbox One. In 2019, it was released as Deadly Premonition: Origins as a temporary exclusive on the Nintendo Switch, a version based on the original Deadly Premonition rather than its Director's Cut.

=== Director's cut ===
The director's cut of Deadly Premonition was developed by ToyBox Inc. In 2013, Rising Star published it for the PlayStation 3 in Europe and North America on April 30, and in Australia on May 16. The same year, Rising Star published it for Microsoft Windows on October 29, and its non-configurable resolution for the PC edition was fixed by a fan-made patch. Deadly Premonition: Red Seeds Profile: Complete Edition, a Japanese version of the director's cut, was released for the PlayStation 3 in March 2015. Also that year, NIS America published a limited collector's edition for the PlayStation 3 on November 24; it includes a hardcover artbook, soundtrack CD, a 54-card deck inspired by the game, and a voucher for the downloadable content.

The director's cut has updated controls, stereoscopic 3D, updated HD visuals, PlayStation Move support, downloadable content including various pre-order bonuses, and additional scenarios written by Suehiro. It adds a frame story of an elderly Zach narrating the plot of Deadly Premonition to his granddaughter, Michelle Louise Morgan. The extended ending shows the elderly Zach entering the parallel plane of existence, where he is warmly greeted by the inhabitants. York reassures him that he was there every step of the way and tells him about a new case involving an outbreak of illness in New Orleans. After asking his opinion on the case, York tells him to wake up, and Louise can be heard off-screen informing her mother that he has disappeared and wondering where he could have gone to.

=== Related media ===
An interactive guide, Deadly Premonition The Director's Cut: The Official Visual Companion was released by Rising Star Games exclusively for iPad in October 2013. It includes three interactive maps, concept sketches, the soundtrack, Suehiro's notebook from the development of the game, and other interactive elements, such as puzzles.

== Reception ==
Reception

Aggregate score
Aggregator	Score
Metacritic	(X360) 68/100 (PS3) 70/100 (PC) 59/100 (NS) 70/100

Review scores
Publication	Score
1Up.com	B
Destructoid	10 / 10
Edge	7 / 10
Eurogamer	7 / 10
Famitsu	5/10, 7/10, 5/10, 5/10
Game Informer	7.75 / 10
GameSpot	7 / 10
IGN	2.0 / 10 (US); 7.5 / 10 (UK); 7.0 / 10 (Director's Cut)
PALGN	7 / 10
X-Play	4/5

Awards
Publication	Award
Gamasutra	Best Cult Game
GameSpot	Most Surprisingly Good Game
GamesRadar	Best Worst Game
Guinness World Records Gamer's Edition	Most Critically Polarizing Survival Horror Game

In North America, Deadly Premonition led sales of Xbox 360 games on Amazon for the week of April 9, 2010, temporarily overtaking higher-profile releases such as Battlefield: Bad Company 2, Call of Duty: Modern Warfare 2, Mass Effect 2, and Left 4 Dead 2. 50,000 copies of Deadly Premonition were sold in North America during the first three months after its debut. According to an interview with Suehiro in February 2013, the original release of the game has not been commercially successful.

The original version of Deadly Premonition for Xbox 360 received a weighted average score of 68/100 from aggregator Metacritic, indicating "mixed or average" reception. It is a critically polarizing game, with scores ranging from as low as two out of ten from IGN US, to as high as ten out of ten from Destructoid. In the 2012 Guinness World Records Gamer's Edition, Deadly Premonition holds the record as the "Most Critically Polarizing Survival Horror Game".

The plot was positively received as eccentric and enjoyable. A reviewer for Edge wrote: "The beauty of Deadly Premonition is that it's a straightforward whodunnit viewed through the cracked prism of an unreliable narrator, conjuring an atmosphere of suspicion and confusion throughout". Destructoid's James Stephanie Sterling appreciated the game's pop culture references, humor, and the dialogue, which they found to be hilarious and befuddling. The characters were positively received by reviewers as memorable and endearing. According to IGN UK, the interaction with characters and uncovering the details of their fictional lives helped to create a sense of emotional engagement with them that lasted after the game ended. York received a similar reception as "oddly endearing" despite his arrogance, and "one of the most interesting gaming protagonists for years".

The gameplay received a range of critical reaction, from competently done for a budget title to horribly executed. The gameplay of Deadly Premonition drew comparisons to that of Shenmue and the Clock Tower series while its combat was compared to that of Resident Evil 4. According to 1UP's Frank Cifaldi, Deadly Premonition's combination of similar gameplay to Shenmue, The Last Express, Resident Evil 4, and the Grand Theft Auto series, proved to be "a 'jack of all trades, master of none' scenario", a sentiment that Erik Brudvig of IGN US agreed with. The controls also were criticized as detracting from the game's appeal. The combat sections received mixed reactions. IGN UK's Matt Wales wrote that while the combat was simple, the atmosphere and profiling worked nicely. According to Eurogamer's Chris Shilling, the sudden appearances of the Raincoat Killer made the sections frightening and the profiling made for some unsettling yet "relatively restrained" moments of horror, despite the "over-long and frequently clumsy" combat sequences. Kevin VanOrd of GameSpot described the supernatural enemies as not particularly aggressive and boss battles as taking too long.

Further criticism was directed at the game's music and visual quality. The graphics were frequently remarked upon as "terrible" and low quality. PALGN's Bev Chen, in contrast, felt that the quality of the graphics worked in the game's favor by adding a "bizarre charm". Similarly, the game's soundtrack received criticism as sometimes thematically inappropriate, with serious scenes often containing a light-hearted jazz track; conversely, some critics found the soundtrack memorable and enjoyable, though repetitive in its selection.

Nevertheless, the game has received a significant cult following. This cult success was attributed to how the game's "wildly mixed critical reception and headline-making strangeness got people talking" by Will Herring of GamePro. Citing the game as an example of "video games as art", David Jenkins of the Metro praised it for an "emotional range" encompassing survival horror and comedic farce. G4TV named it one of the "Top 10 Games of 2010... So Far" in June 2010. The game has received over a dozen other awards from various publications, including "Best Cult Game" from Gamasutra, "Most Surprisingly Good Game" from GameSpot, and "Best Worst Game" from GamesRadar.

Critics have noted multiple allusions to Twin Peaks; among them are "its well dressed FBI agent, rural Pacific Northwest setting, and a healthy dose of woodsy supernatural mythos". Reviewers have remarked on similarities in Deadly Premonition's characters with those of Twin Peaks. York has been commented on as sharing similarities with Twin Peak's protagonist Dale Cooper, notably a love of coffee and habitually addressing an unseen character; the first murder victim, Anna Graham, may be a homage to Laura Palmer, while her name may be a reference to both the character Annie Blackburn and the actress who portrayed her, Heather Graham. The Pot Lady, a side character who carries around a pot, may be a reference to the Log Lady, although they serve different narrative functions. The Red Room of Deadly Premonition has some similarities with the Red Room of Twin Peaks, in that both are supernatural locations that the protagonist can access. The A & G Diner might be a reference to the RR Diner of Twin Peaks, both of which are based on Twede's Cafe in North Bend, Washington. The Great Deer Yard Hotel may be inspired by Twin Peaks's the Great Northern Hotel, which was based on the Salish Lodge in Snoqualmie Falls, Washington. The character Emily has also been noted to visually resemble actress Naomi Watts, who starred in a film directed by David Lynch, Mulholland Drive, and later appeared in Twin Peaks: The Return.

The director's cut for the PlayStation 3 received a weighted average of 70/100 from Metacritic, also indicating "mixed or average reviews". Eurogamer's Oli Welsh wrote that the director's cut corrects some of the original flaws but others are left untouched, "just as you'd want it, really". Kevin VanOrd of GameSpot remarked that, while the director's cut had not been "a dramatic overhaul", the game remained enjoyable and entertaining. Conversely, the Official PlayStation Magazine's concluded that the retail price was too high to justify recommending the director's cut with all its flaws. Critics praised the new controls as an improvement. The graphics received more mixed reviews: Sterling wrote that "this new version at least looks better on modern televisions -- though your mileage may vary", while other reviewers concluded that, even with improvements, the graphics still either barely met or fell beneath standards for a later PlayStation 2 game. The inclusion of the minor narrative additions were generally enjoyed, although not viewed by critics as adding anything substantial to the plot. Issues with the frame rate and an "echo" effect with the voice acting were also noted in the port.

== Sequel ==
A sequel called Deadly Premonition 2: A Blessing in Disguise for the Nintendo Switch was released on July 10, 2020. Set in 2019 in Boston, the plot focuses on Aaliyah Davis, an FBI agent who reopens an old investigation; her story intertwines with that of Francis York Morgan, fourteen years prior in the city of Le Carré, which is based on New Orleans.
