= Namachūkei 68 =

1991 video game

- Developer: Konami
- Publisher: Konami
- Director: Akihiro Minakata
- Designer: Koji Toyohara
- Programmer: Isao Akada
- Composer: Yuji Takenouchi
- Platform: X68000
- Release: JP: July 30, 1991
- Genre: Sports
- Modes: Single-player, multiplayer

Namachūkei 68 (Note: Japanese: 生中継６８, Hepburn: Namachuukei 68; lit. "Live Broadcast 68") is a 1991 sports video game developed and published by Konami for the X68000. In the game, players have the choice to compete in matches against computer-controlled opponents or other human players in either a single game or a full season. The players selects between 12 teams that come with the game, but can also create their own team as well as manage the statistics of each individual player. Gameplay incorporates multiple camera angles to present a pseudo-3D perspective, in a manner resembling a sports television broadcast.

Namachūkei 68 served as the fourth stand-alone title developed Konami for the X68000, following their conversion of Parodius Da! Shinwa kara Owarai e on the platform. The game was directed by Akihiro Minakata, who later worked on the Jikkyō Powerful Pro Yakyū series. It was designed by Koji Toyohara, who had previously worked on Gekitotsu Pennant Race 2 for the MSX2/MSX2+ home computers. The soundtrack was scored by Konami Kukeiha Club member Yuji Takenouchi. It was met with generally favorable reception from reviewers.

== Gameplay ==
Gameplay screenshot

Namachūkei 68 is a sports game. The players have the choice to compete in matches against computer-controlled opponents or other human players in either a single game or a full season. The players selects between 12 teams that come with the game, but can also create their own team and manage the statistics of each individual player. Multiple camera angles are incorporated during gameplay to present a pseudo-3D perspective, in a manner resembling a sports television broadcast.

== Development and release ==
Namachūkei 68 served as the fourth stand-alone title developed by Konami for the X68000, following their conversion of Parodius Da! Shinwa kara Owarai e on the platform. The game was directed by Akihiro "A.S." Minakata (who later worked on the Jikkyō Powerful Pro Yakyū series) and designed by Koji "Toy" Toyohara, who had previously worked on Gekitotsu Pennant Race 2 for the MSX2/MSX2+ home computers. Isao Akada served as the game's sole programmer, while the soundtrack was scored by Konami Kukeiha Club member Yuji Takenouchi, with Masahiro Ikariko, Hideto "Imo" Inoue, Kaori Kinouchi, and Yuichi "Mine" Takamine assisting in the sound department. The game was first announced in 1990, planning for a January 1991 release date, but was ultimately published by Konami on July 30, 1991 (although July 19, 1991 is also listed as release date). In 2006, select music tracks from the game were included as part of a compilation album titled Legend Of Game Music Consumer Box, distributed in Japan by Scitron.

== Reception ==
Reception

Review score
Publication	Score
Technopolis	4/5 stars

Namachūkei 68 was met with generally favorable reception from reviewers. Micom BASIC Magazine noted the game's sense of realism and "splendid" graphical direction, but commented that it may prove initially difficult because of the pseudo-3D point of view. Micom BASIC also ranked Namachūkei 68 at the number nine spot in popularity on their October 1991 issue. Oh!X's Ogikubo Kei commended the game's audiovisual presentation, but felt that it was slower but difficult compared to fast-paced action titles on the X68000. Nevertheless, Kei recommended it for fans of professional baseball. Technopolis gave the game a positive outlook.
