= Spy Fiction =

2003 video game

- Developer: Access Games
- Publisher: Sammy
- Director: Hidetaka Suehiro
- Producer: Kuniaki Kakuwa
- Artist: Range Murata
- Writer: Hidetaka Suehiro
- Composers: Yoshiyuki Ishii; Dota Ando
- Platform: PlayStation 2
- Release: JP: December 25, 2003; NA: August 31, 2004; EU: October 1, 2004
- Genres: Action-adventure, stealth
- Mode: Single-player

Spy Fiction (スパイフィクション, Supai Fikushon) is an action-adventure stealth video game developed by Access Games and released for the PlayStation 2 in 2003.

The game is promoted as "stealth action inspired by genre-defined espionage classics" and gives players the ability to disguise themselves as any character in the game. The lack of advertising before release and realism in the game are commonly cited as reasons why this game was outshone by its competitors in the stealth genre and sold poorly.

== Plot ==
The fictional Special Execution Agency (S.E.A.) sends three operatives from their Phantom Unit, Billy Bishop, Sheila Crawford and Nicklaus Nightwood; onto the roof of Castle Wolfgang in Austria. Eve, SEA's commanding officer, informs them that the terrorist group Enigma is inside the castle, and they must be stopped before they can utilize their bio-weapon "Lahder". The trio are successful in infiltrating the castle, but Nicklaus is captured in the process. The player infiltrates a chapel within the castle by posing as Enigma's second-in-command, Dietrich Troy. Inside, Bishop and Sheila are confronted by the real Dietrich, as well as Enigma's anonymous leader and a group of guards. Dietrich displays Nicklaus hung upon a crucifix, shooting and killing him as the leader leaves. A flashback commences once Nicklaus has died.

The story proper begins two months prior to the game's opening. The player is heading a covert investigation into NanotechDyne Inc, a pharmaceutical company suspected of developing biochemical weapons. The SEA needs to access files on the computer of the new Research Director, Forrest Kaysen, who recently displaced Dr. Alice Coleman. The player must retrieve a password for the computer, also including a scan of Kaysen's retina to access the computer. The plan is a success, and the player is extracted and sent back in at midnight to access the computer. The player then secures the files, seeing the emblem of Enigma on the desktop.

The player is teamed up with the other possible player character as well as Nicklaus and Phantom's team leader, Samuel Berkeley. Kaysen has been linked to the Metropolis' owner, Kelly Wong, and Phantom must observe a meeting between the doctor and the businesswoman. Sheila knocks Kaysen out, allowing Billy to pose as him and take his place at the meeting while Sheila eavesdrops.

The player makes it to the demonstration without Nicklaus. Lahder turns out to be a small grenade-like sphere, emitting purple gas. Kaysen prepares to test the device on a monkey before an audience, mostly consisting of arms dealers and criminals. However, Wong nods to Troy, standing behind the scenes, and pushes Kaysen into isolation with Lahder and the monkey. Although Kaysen is killed, Nicklaus contacts the player stating that they've been discovered. The player attempts to escape, finding Wong surrounded by guards. The player disarms Wong and neutralizes her men, holding her at gunpoint. Troy appears, holding the player at gunpoint as well, and shoots Wong.

Disguising themselves as Troy to enter the plant, the player destroys the payload and sets out to escape before US forces bomb the facility. The player then finds a wounded Nicklaus locked in a storage crate. He tells the player that Dr. Coleman is in the holding cells, and the player goes to rescue her. After a gunfight, Coleman is captured by General Douglas Lysander. The player chases and then battles Lysander before Nicklaus fatally shoots him, allowing them to secure Coleman and escape.

Enigma announces their ultimatum, demanding the US "confess its sins" and resign from the UN Security Council. Bishop, Sheila and Samuel are then sent to the Rodt Rose Railway Station in Austria to resolve a hostage situation caused by Enigma. Samuel is wounded in combat, and sends the player to free the hostages. The hostage situation turns out to be staged, and the player is ambushed after Troy suggests that there is a traitor in Phantom. Troy elaborates on Enigma's plans, saying that they intend to trigger a third World War. Troy escapes, and Samuel reveals that Enigma's leader is actually a former Phantom leader named Dimitri Vedernikov, aka Scarface, and that Vedernikov was once Samuel's partner, and is Billy's father. Bishop and Sheila decide to sacrifice Samuel, sending him toward a bridge rigged with explosives and ending his life.

The player then returns to Nicklaus's death in the chapel. The player wounds Troy in battle, before special forces arrive and fatally shoot him. The player continues forward to confront Scarface, who is preparing to fly the Metropolis filled with Lahder over the US. Before the battle, Sheila is revealed to be one of the Gospel Children known as AG7753, before Scarface gave her a name. Scarface battles the player and reveals his cyborg body, but is defeated, and uses a vaccine called Jacob created by Coleman to destroy the virus, leaving Scarface to die in the explosion.

Following Metropolis' destruction, Eve later manages to get into contact after someone jammed the transmission. Nicklaus is actually alive, and the body recovered from the chapel is Phantom's tech officer, Michael Kwan. Bishop and Sheila track Nicklaus to an Airbase, where he intends to flee, now revealed as double agent for both Phantom and Enigma. During the confrontation, Nicklaus reveals himself to be Dietrich Troy (The one that was killed in the chapel by the Special Forces was a decoy).

Nicklaus explains that he was against both Enigma and Phantom, acting for his own motives of revenge against Scarface and Billy, of whom he is the half-brother. Nicklaus had been seeking revenge on Scarface for killing his mother, and Billy out of jealousy that "While [Nicklaus] froze in a Siberian orphanage, [Billy] grew up with a mother who loved [him]".

Nicklaus uses a flash grenade to escape, prompting Bishop and Sheila to chase him as he boards a plane and starts down the runway. The player shoots a hole in the gas tank, and uses a flare to ignite it as Nicklaus takes off. The flare burns along the gas trail, reaching the plane and destroying it, killing Nicklaus as well. The game ends with Billy wondering who "the battle was really against".

== Development and release ==
Spy Fiction was presented at the 2003 Tokyo Game Show prior to its Japanese release. It was later shown at E3 2004 in anticipation of its US release, with the US version promising an upgraded version of the game.

== Reception ==
Reception

Aggregate score
Aggregator	Score
Metacritic	61/100

Review scores
Publication	Score
Electronic Gaming Monthly	4.5/10
Famitsu	28/40
Game Informer	7.5/10
GamePro	3/5
GameRevolution	D
GameSpot	6.6/10
GameSpy	2.5/5
GameZone	7.7/10
IGN	7.3/10
Official U.S. PlayStation Magazine	2/5
The Sydney Morning Herald	2.5/5

The game received "mixed" reviews according to review aggregator Metacritic.
