= Thunder Cross (video game) =

1988 video game

- Developer(s): Konami
- Publisher(s): Konami
- Platform(s): Arcade
- Release: JP: October 1988; NA: January 1989; EU: 1989
- Genre(s): Scrolling shooter
- Mode(s): Single-player, multiplayer

Thunder Cross (Note: Japanese: サンダークロス, Hepburn: Sandā Kurosu) is a horizontally scrolling shooter video game developed and published by Konami for arcades. It was released in October 1988 in Japan and January 1989 in North America. A sequel, Thunder Cross II, was published in 1991. Owing to several similarities, Space Manbow (1989) may also be considered a spin-off.

Hamster Corporation released the game as part of the Oretachi Geasen Zoku Sono budget series for the PlayStation 2 in Japan in 2007. It was later released as part of the Arcade Archives series for the PlayStation 4 in 2017 and Nintendo Switch in 2021. This version was added to Konami's Arcade Classics Anniversary Collection for the Nintendo Switch, PlayStation 4, Windows and Xbox One in 2019.

== Gameplay ==
Thunder Cross is a classic horizontal shooter with seven stages. Players control the Thunder fighter with up to four "options", which arrange up and down vertically and attack at the player's will. Three weapons are selectable ranging from the Vulcan shot to the Laser and the Boomerang shot (which doubles as a ricochet weapon). End-of-level bosses are present and, typical of a Konami shooter, Thunder Cross has the player to beat the game twice in a harder loop of the first seven levels.

== Plot ==
Taking place in the future of space colonization, the planet Haniamu IV is under attack from a relentless, unknown military force known only as Black Impulse. The strongest Earth ships capable of stopping the total conquering of the planet are the Blue Thunder M-45 (player 1) and its earlier make the Red Thunder M-24 (player 2).

== Reception ==
In Japan, Game Machine listed Thunder Cross on their December 1, 1988 issue as being the second most-successful table arcade unit at the time.
