= D4: Dark Dreams Don't Die =

2014 video game

- Developer: Access Games (Note: Consult assistance provided by Microsoft Game Studios Japan)
- Publisher: Microsoft Studios (Note: Windows version published by Playism.)
- Directors: Hidetaka Suehiro; Isao Hiroyoshi
- Producer: Nobou Tomita
- Designers: Keisuke Mori; Shintaro Imai
- Programmers: Masato Kono; Masanori Okabe
- Artist: Hitoshi Okamoto
- Writers: Hidetaka Suehiro; Hiroyuki Saegusa; Kenji Goda
- Composers: Tomomi Teratani; Yuji Takenouchi; Rio Okano; Atsushi Yamaji
- Engine: Unreal Engine 3
- Platforms: Xbox One; Windows
- Release: Xbox One; 19 September 2014; Microsoft Windows; 5 June 2015
- Genre: Adventure
- Mode: Single-player

D4: Dark Dreams Don't Die is an episodic graphical adventure video game developed by Access Games and published by Microsoft Studios for the Xbox One. The title represents the phrase "Dark Dreams Don't Die" and the fourth dimension (time). The game is unrelated to D or D2. The initial release contains a prologue and two episodes that make up Season 1 of the series. A PC version was released on 5 June 2015, published by Playism in partnership with Access Games. In October 2016, Hidetaka Suehiro announced that he had left Access Games and that there would be no more episodes of D4.

== Gameplay ==
A screenshot of David and Amanda

The main character is David Young, a private investigator whose wife has been murdered. The traumatic events surrounding her death left Young unable to recollect those memories, but has allowed him to travel through time. Young travels through time to undo the murder. The player cannot time travel arbitrarily, as the powers are activated upon finding certain objects that bring the player to specific points in time.

D4 is an Xbox One title that uses Kinect controls with "simple gestures and voice" to uncover the mystery. The game uses cel-shaded graphics similar to that of a graphic novel. For the PC version, however, Kinect has been disabled in favor of mouse controls. Some improvements have also been implemented in the PC version, such as upgrading the frame rate to 60 fps, shortening load times, and fixing bugs that were present in the original version.

== Plot ==
Two years prior to the events in the game, David Young, a narcotics officer for the Boston police, comes home to find his wife dying. He hears her final words, "Look for D," before waking up in the ICU. Lodged in his head is a bullet that the story alludes to being received by his wife's murderer. Other than coming home to his dying wife and her final words, Young cannot recall what happened that day. This inability haunts him as he undertakes the investigation into the incident. A botched investigation by the police (and a questioning of his sanity) leads Young to resign and become a private investigator, opting to solve the case himself. Aiding him is his newfound "gift" to travel into the past: an ability he credits to a bullet lodged in his head. By touching objects, or what is referred to as "mementos," Young can travel backwards to a specific place and time and to where that object was relevant. What he gains with his gift, however, he loses with memories of his wife and the incident.

David, with his newly gained ability, uses it to uncover the unknown assailant by investigating everyone whose name starts with "D." With help from his former partner, Young gets a lead about a man whose boss's name starts with "D" and who went missing on a plane after it was struck by lightning. David uses a memento to travel back into the past to investigate.

== Reception ==
Reception

Aggregate score
Aggregator	Score	
Aggregator	PC	Xbox One
Metacritic	67/100	76/100

Review scores
Publication	Score	
Publication	PC	Xbox One
Destructoid	N/A	9/10
Edge	N/A	7/10
Famitsu	N/A	33/40
Game Informer	N/A	7.5/10
GameRevolution	4/5	4/5
GameSpot	N/A	7/10
Giant Bomb	N/A	4/5
IGN	N/A	7/10
Joystiq	N/A	4/5
Official Xbox Magazine (UK)	N/A	8/10
PC Gamer (UK)	78%	N/A
Polygon	N/A	7/10
Digital Spy	N/A	4/5
Metro	7/10	7/10

The Xbox One version received "generally favourable reviews", while the PC version received "average" reviews, according to the review aggregation website Metacritic. In Japan, Famitsu gave the Xbox One version a score of two eights, one nine, and one eight for a total of 33 out of 40.

Digital Spy gave the Xbox One version four stars out of five and said that it "may just be the beginning, but it is easily one of the most delightfully bizarre trips of the year. It won't always make sense, but there is a consistent earnestness to its oddity that somehow makes it all work in harmony of '80s saxophone riffs and overly-affected Boston accents." The Escapist similarly gave it four stars out of five and said, "D4 is ridiculous. It's weird, and silly, and makes very little sense. It's also hilarious, and packed with some of the most engaging motion-controlled sequences I've ever played. Coming from someone who generally doesn't like the Kinect, that's a damn big achievement!" 411Mania gave it a score of 7.5 out of 10 and said, "If you want a game that will leave your jaw on the floor more than once, have at it. If you want something a bit more substantial, this may not be the game for you." Metro gave both console versions each a score of seven out of ten and called the game itself "A worthy follow-up to Deadly Premonition, although whether it earns the same classic status will depend largely on the subsequent episodes" or "...on whether the story is ever finished." However, Anime News Network gave the PC version a C+, saying, "The wheels of game production turn ever on. As the pressure of expanding budgets makes games like this the exception in a world populated by Final Fantasy, Assassin's Creed and, paradoxically, the Telltale Adventure Game model itself, the Season One moniker slapped on this PC port begins to feel like the twist of a knife: the mildly laughable suggestion that there would ever be a Season Two. Despite D4's ham-fisted grabs at Twin Peaks touchstones and its persistent supposition that "eccentric" is an express shortcut to "intriguing," somehow it's still disappointing we might never see any more of it."

D4: Dark Dreams Don't Die was nominated for "Destructoid's Best of E3 2014" as "Best Xbox Exclusive" at E3 in 2014. It was also nominated for "TGS Awards 2014" in the category Xbox at TGS, and for "4Gamer Awards" as "Rookie Exclusive" on 1 October 2014. At the 2014 National Academy of Video Game Trade Reviewers (NAVGTR) awards the game won Camera Direction in a Game Engine.
