= Space Manbow =

1989 video game

- Developer: Konami
- Publisher: Konami
- Programmer: Ritsushi Sagisaka
- Artist: Tomiharu Kinoshita
- Composers: Tsuyoshi Sekito; Yuji Takenouchi
- Platforms: MSX2, Mobile phone
- Release: MSX2: JP: December 22, 1989; Mobile phone: JP: September 1, 2006 (i-mode); JP: March 1, 2007 (S! Appli); JP: August 7, 2008 (EZweb)
- Genre: Scrolling shooter
- Mode: Single-player

Space Manbow (Note: Japanese: スペースマンボウ, Hepburn: Supēsu Manbō) is a 1989 scrolling shooter video game developed and published by Konami for the MSX2 home computer. It was later ported to mobile phones, followed by digital re-releases for the Virtual Console and Microsoft Windows via Project EGG. The plot follows Kliever Mu, an archaeologist and former pilot, who takes on the mission of preventing the Manbow space battleship from destroying the solar system. The player controls the Manbow-J, fighting enemies and avoiding obstacles, while collecting power-ups to enhance the ship's firepower.

Konami's MSX division initially decided to adapt the arcade game Thunder Cross for the MSX, but the final product was deemed uninteresting. Konami would halt production if the game was not enjoyable, so the team remade it several times, but it still failed to get approval. Around that time, Osaka Gas began incorporating manbow fish into its advertising, and Akihiko Nagata, general manager of Konami's PC department, decided to capitalize on the idea. The game was redesigned from scratch, with input from other teams within the MSX division, resulting in Space Manbow. The soundtrack was composed by Tsuyoshi Sekito and Yuji Takenouchi using a sound chip that expanded the audio capabilities of the MSX.

Space Manbow earned critical acclaim, with praise for its audiovisual presentation, balanced difficulty, and smooth multidirectional scrolling. Retrospective commentary in the years following its release have hailed it as one of the best titles for the MSX.

== Gameplay ==
The Manbow-J ship, with two option units attached firing backwards, navigating through obstacles in the sixth stage of Space Manbow

Space Manbow is a scrolling shooter game. The premise takes place in the year 189 of the stellar calendar, where humanity has begun to expand into space. An archaeological research team discovers the ruins of an ancient civilization on a mechanized planet. As the research delves deeper into the subterranean depths, weapons installed across the planet begin to activate, as the ancient civilization's automated defense system was still active. Perceiving the team as an enemy and the research as an invasion, the planet's defense system deploys a colossal space battleship called the Manbow to attack the solar system. Archaeologist and former pilot Kliever Mu decides to use the Manbow-J, a fighter craft built from blueprints unearthed in the ruins, and take on the mission of preventing the Manbow from destroying the solar system.

The player controls the Manbow-J, fighting enemies and avoiding obstacles. The ship is equipped with a main front-firing weapon that can be switched between two types: a needle shot (N) and a wide shot (W). Weapons are obtained from items capsules dropped by defeated enemies. Firepower can be increased up to four levels by collecting red capsules, but the ship's power indicator will gradually decrease unless the player collects additional capsules. The ship can also be equipped with two option (O) units, which fly in a fixed top-down formation. These units only fire needle shots, but the player can freely adjust the firing direction forward, backward, or up and down. Enemies can also drop blue bomb capsules upon defeat, which the player can store and deploy to destroy all enemies. Other power-up items include a ground missile (M) and speed boosts (S).

There are a total of seven stages, each with a boss. Each stage scrolls in different directions: upwards, forwards, downwards, backwards, or diagonally. Being hit by an enemy, enemy fire, or colliding with obstacles results in the loss of a life. The player starts with three lives and can gain more by reaching certain score thresholds. The game is over once all lives are lost, although the player can start again or continue from the beginning of the last stage reached, but with the loss of collected items and a decrease in the power gauge.

== Development ==
Space Manbow was developed by the MSX division at Konami's PC development department, under the general management of Akihiko Nagata. Initially, the team decided to adapt the arcade game Thunder Cross for the MSX. The final product was deemed excellent from a programming standpoint, but uninteresting and was not expected to sell well in its current state. Konami would order production to cease if the game was not entertaining, so the team repeatedly remade it under the working titles Alphard (Note: アルファード (Alphard)) and Egzart (Note: エグザルト (Eguzaruto)), leading to constant delays, but it still failed to gain approval. Around that time, Osaka Gas began including the manbow (Note: マンボウ (Manbō)), a popular fish back then, in its advertisements, and Nagata thought of taking advantage of the idea. Hideo Kojima and Konami composer Yasuhiko "Mansan" Manno recalled that one day, Nagata said aloud, "Manbow sounds good, right?" and everyone exclaimed, "Huh?". Deciding that the game would not work as it was, Nagata ordered the name changed, resulting in Space Manbow.

The MSX division consisted of four teams, each led by a different planner, who evaluated each other's games. If one team's game was deemed uninteresting, the others would halt their work and help rebuild it into a successful one. Since no member of the staff had prior experience in developing shoot 'em ups, Ryouhei "Ryokun" Shogaki, one of the developers responsible for The Maze of Galious (1987), and graphic designer Naoki Matsui stepped in to assist. Shogaki provided sketches for the player character and bosses, while Matsui advised on map layout and enemy obstacles. The team used this advice to redesign the game and replace all the sprites from scratch, a process that took a month, but culminated in Space Manbow being approved by Konami's top management. The game employs a sprite driver written by Konami, which doubles the maximum number of sprites the MSX2 can display to 64.

Tomiharu Kinoshita, who worked on MSX titles such as F-1 Spirit: The Way to Formula-1 (1987) and Snatcher (1988), created the ending sequence along with programmer Ritsushi Sagisaka. Kinoshita drew the storyboards and sprites, and provided the data to Sagisaka. He also offered his input on details such as screen timing, as he wanted the sequence to have the feel of a cinematic ending. Kinoshita did not have any music in mind, but after the ending theme was finished, he adjusted the timing and made modifications to the sequence until he managed to synchronize it and was satisfied. He recalled that the team felt unable to develop the game due to their inexperience with shoot 'em ups, as Gradius 2, Salamander, and Parodius were popular with fans and within Konami on the MSX. Kojima stated that Space Manbow turned out to be a good game thanks to the developers' dedication.

=== Music ===
The music for Space Manbow was composed by Tsuyoshi Sekito as his first title, and Yuji Takenouchi, with Michiru Yamane providing compositional support. Sekito joined Konami in 1986 and initially worked on Gradius 2 for the MSX; all of the compositions he submitted were rejected, but he developed a friendship with other composers during the project. Takenouchi joined Konami in 1989 while studying at a technical school when a job opportunity arose. He was assigned to compose music for the MSX division, collaborating with Manno on his first title, Gekitotsu Pennant Race 2. The game utilized the Sound Creative Chip (SCC), conceived by sound designer Kazuhiko "Piston" Uehara and developed by Konami in collaboration with Toshiba, which expanded the MSX's audio capabilities by providing five channels of wavetable sound.

Sekito composed most of the game's soundtrack. His music emphasizes upbeat melodies and, occasionally, a darker soundscape. He found it difficult to achieve a sound distinct from that of the Gradius series. Sekito was also in charge of the game's sound effects, with the collaboration of Manno and Uehara. Originally, a boss emitted a cry-like sound effect using a programming error in the SCC that interpreted waveform changes, but it was ultimately scrapped. Sekito and Uehara stated that the game had many discarded elements, music, and sound effects that the team could use to create another title. Takenouchi handled the ending theme, "Memoire," among other tracks. He considered the ending theme the most challenging of all the songs he had composed, but expressed pride in his work. Takenouchi regarded Space Manbow as his favorite MSX project and the starting point of his career.

A CD album was released in Japan by King Records on April 5, 1990, containing the original soundtrack for Space Manbow, as well as two arrangements by Konami Kukeiha Club. The game's ending theme appeared as part of Konami Ending Collection (1991), a two-CD album released by King Records that included ending themes from fifty Konami titles. An arrangement of the ending theme appeared on Konami All Stars ~The Senryo-Bako Heisei 4 Nen Ban~ (1992), a three-CD album released by King Records featuring live performances and arrangements by Konami Kukeiha Club. In 1998, King Records re-released the original album on Konami MSX Super Best Antiques, a two-CD set containing the soundtracks for Metal Gear 2: Solid Snake and Gofer no Yabō Episode II. The game's soundtrack has also been included on the albums Legend Of Game Music Premium Box (2005) and Konami Shooting Collection (2011).

== Release ==
Space Manbow was published by Konami for the MSX2 in Japan on December 22, 1989. The Japanese publication MSX Fan wrote that it was released on December 21, 1989. Konami first ported the game through its online service Konami Net DX (Note: コナミネットDX (Konami Netto DX)) for i-mode compatible mobile phones on September 1, 2006, then for Yahoo! Keitai compatible phones on March 1, 2007, and later for EZweb compatible phones on August 7, 2008. The game was re-released two times on the Japanese Virtual Console; first for the Wii on November 24, 2009, and later for the Wii U on February 19, 2014. It was also re-released for Microsoft Windows through D4 Enterprise's Project EGG service on July 28, 2015.

== Reception ==
Reception

Review scores
Publication	Score
Nintendo Life	8/10
Software Gids	5/5

Space Manbow received acclaim from critics. The Japanese magazine LOGiN highlighted the game's smooth scrolling, the lack of flickering, the variety of enemies, and the music, but noted its low level of difficulty. Micom BASIC Magazine's Kazuhiko Nishijō felt that the game surpassed the Gradius series, citing its gameplay and power-up system. The Japanese MSX Magazine praised the game for its audiovisual presentation, excellent difficulty balance, and smooth scrolling. MSX Club's Pere Baño lauded the game's visuals for its remarkable use of color and scrolling backgrounds, as well as the sound design for being up to par. Software Gids' Dennis Lardenoye applauded the game's graphical department for its large bosses and multidirectional scrolling. MSX Computer Magazine proclaimed that "With Space Manbow, Konami once again proves to be among the absolute top MSX developers".

In retrospectives, Space Manbow has been listed among the best MSX games by Retro Gamer, HobbyConsolas, and Time Extension. Rafael Lima of SHMUPS! (a part of the GameSpy network) lauded the game's colorful sprite designs, audio, balanced difficulty, smooth scrolling, and overall technical performance. GamesTM highlighted the game's impressive visuals, arcade-quality soundtrack, and gameplay. Nintendo Life's Sean Aaron praised the quality of the game's audiovisual presentation and its great sense of balance. MeriStation's Francisco Alberto Serrano stated that the game demonstrated how the MSX2 had more technical potential than most 8-bit systems on the market. PC Gamer's Bill Loguidice commended its smooth scrolling, detailed graphics, and well-designed gameplay. Hardcore Gaming 101's Kurt Kalata assessed that "Space Manbow is the most beautiful 8-bit shooter in existence".

== Legacy ==
The Mambo and Samba sunfish in Gokujō Parodius are based on the Manbow-J ship from Space Manbow. Planner and programmer Tsukasa "Chichibinta" Tokuda wanted the game's character roster to focus on living creatures rather than ships. Animator Shūjirō Hamakawa (credited as character designer under the pseudonym "Shuzilow.Ha!") stated that the character concept arose spontaneously. The first stage of Space Manbow appears as an unlockable in Ganbare Goemon: Tōkai Dōchū Ōedo Tengu ri Kaeshi no Maki if the Kessaku-sen! Ganbare Goemon 1・2: Yuki-hime to Magginesu collection for Game Boy Advance is inserted into the bottom cartridge slot of the Nintendo DS. In 2007, Stichting Sunrise published a fan sequel titled Manbow 2, developed by RenovatiO, for the MSX2 at an MSX fair in Bussum.
