= Deadly Premonition 2: A Blessing in Disguise =

2020 video game

- Developers: Toybox Inc. White Owls Inc. Now Production
- Publishers: JP: Toybox Inc.; AU: Nintendo (NS); WW: Rising Star Games
- Director: Hidetaka Suehiro
- Producer: Tomio Kanazawa
- Programmer: Hideto Suzuki
- Artists: Syuhou Imai; Yukiya Matsuura; Suzuka Imamura
- Writers: Hidetaka Suehiro; Kenji Goda
- Composer: Satoshi Okubo
- Engine: Unity
- Platforms: Nintendo Switch; Windows
- Release: Nintendo Switch; July 10, 2020; Windows; June 11, 2022
- Genre: Survival horror
- Mode: Single-player

Deadly Premonition 2: A Blessing in Disguise is a survival horror video game developed by Toybox, White Owls, and Now Production for the Nintendo Switch. It was released on July 10, 2020 by Toybox in Japan and Rising Star Games internationally. It is both a prequel and sequel to Deadly Premonition, which has garnered a cult following since its release in 2010. A Blessing in Disguise follows FBI Agent Francis York Morgan as he works to solve a murder mystery in the fictional American town of Le Carré, Louisiana.

== Gameplay ==
Deadly Premonition 2 divides its gameplay between two sections. In the first, the player assumes the role of FBI Agent Aaliyah Davis, who interrogates Francis Zach Morgan in his apartment about his handling of a case involving the murder of a teenage girl. The gameplay of these sections consists mostly of visual novel style dialogue and point and click exploration of Zach’s apartment.

In the second, the player guides a younger Francis York Morgan through the fictional American town of Le Carré, Louisiana, fourteen years prior, as he investigates that case and its connection to a drug ring. These sections are open world, and include side quests alongside the main story. Traversal of the open world is done via skateboard. During these sections, York has a gun that he can use to shoot Louisiana wildlife. There are interstitial combat levels during the main story.

== Plot ==
The frame story of Deadly Premonition 2 takes place in Francis Zach Morgan's apartment in Boston, Massachusetts, in 2019, a decade after the events of Deadly Premonition. There, FBI Special Agent Aaliyah Davis (Mela Lee) and her partner Simon Jones (Christopher Corey Smith) interrogate a sickly Zach (Jeff Kramer) over his involvement in a murder case of sixteen-year-old Lise Clarkson, the granddaughter of the influential Clarkson family, in Le Carré. Zach narrates how he and his alternate personality York, created from his childhood trauma, came to Le Carré in 2005 to investigate the connections between the murder and an addictive street drug, Saint Rouge.

During his investigation in Le Carré, York is periodically aided by riddles from the supernatural entity Houngan and Patricia "Patti" Woods (Cassandra Lee Morris). Patti is the young adopted daughter of the town's sheriff Melvin Woods (Ogie Banks), whose biological mother is his wife, Candy Clarkson. Returning to the scene of Lise's murder, York discovers that she had been dismembered by her mother Galena (Kate Higgins) in the presence of Professor R (Billy Kametz), whom York suspects to be involved in the production of Saint Rouge. York then enters the Otherworld, where he battles a monstrous version of Galena, who claims to have done it in pursuit of creating a new world. Returning to reality, he arrests Galena and takes her to the town's jail.

The next day, he finds that Galena has been murdered and tracks down Professor R, revealed to be a trans woman named Lena Dauman. She had been born the heir to the Clarkson family and later became an apostle for the goddess of fertility after meeting the supernatural entity Forrest Kaysen (Joe Hernandez), using Saint Rouge to transform the bodies and mature the souls of selected human offerings to the goddess. York enters the Otherworld again to examine a scene of violence between Lena and her father, P.J. Clarkson (David Lodge). P.J laments his family's fading prestige, and in a plot twist reveals Lena had an incestuous affair with her elder sister Candy - which then resulted in a child, who is Patti. York then battles a monstrous form of Lena and returns to reality as the bomb Lena planted detonates, killing her and her father. After Melvin and then Patti go missing, York eventually tracks them down to a boathouse. Corrupted by Saint Rouge, Melvin confesses his love for Lena and plans to finish Lena's plan by sacrificing Patti. Melvin, however, changes his mind, and dies along with Candy in an ensuing fire, as Patti escapes with York.

Back in the present, Zach enlists Simon Jones's help to track down Avery Smith (Armen Taylor), a developmentally disabled man infatuated with Lise. Zach returns to Le Carré, to the place where Lise's corpse was found, and confronts Avery in the Otherworld. Zach defeats Avery, but when he attempts to free Patti, he sees a vision of Patti admonishing him for not letting her die back at the boathouse as well as his inability to save Emily, his love interest in Deadly Premonition. Overwhelmed by his guilt over Emily's death, Zach gives into his anguish and is transformed into a monster by Kaysen. Aaliyah confronts Zach and fatally shoots him. When Aaliyah, influenced by Kaysen, tries to shoot Patti, York intervenes to save her and breaks Kaysen's supernatural hold over Aaliyah. Patti, distraught over Zach's impending death, makes a deal with York to prolong Zach's life. In the post-credits scene, Patti video calls Zach, as Zach and York communicate via text.

== Development ==
According to Swery, he was "being ghosted" during the final months of development. He is quoted as saying that "there were so many fixes needed that he submitted approximately 2,000 tickets and not only does he say they were never addressed, he also claims he never had a chance to talk to anybody from the publisher and the studio. I found out the game had been released thanks to a message I received from a fan", he alleges.

== Release ==
A Blessing in Disguise was announced in September 2019, with Hidetaka Suehiro (Swery65) as director and writer. It was published as an exclusive for the Nintendo Switch on July 10, 2020. A Windows port was released on June 12, 2022.

== Reception ==
Reception

Aggregate score
Aggregator	Score
Metacritic	56/100 (Switch); 54/100 (PC)

Review scores
Publication	Score
Destructoid	8/10
Game Informer	5/10
GameSpot	5/10
Hardcore Gamer	3.5/5
IGN	5/10
Nintendo Life	7/10

Deadly Premonition 2 received mixed reviews upon release. Some critics concluded that the game did not reach the same heights as Deadly Premonition, with the other elements of the game unable to compensate for the technical performance, as had previously happened in Deadly Premonition. Others wrote that, while not quite as enjoyable as Deadly Premonition, it was still a serviceable sequel with an intriguing storyline and characters.

The characters generally received praise as enjoyably eccentric, though some reviewers felt that the relatively smaller cast, as compared to Deadly Premonition, limited the narrative range of the murder mystery. York was similarly highlighted as a major strength of the narrative, with one reviewer describing him as "undoubtedly Deadly Premonition 2's saving grace".

A major point of criticism focused on the game's technical performance. Reviewers often criticized the frame rate as slow and considerably detracting from the experience of the game, particularly when exploring the outdoor portion of Deadly Premonition 2's open world. The absence of an option to invert the game's camera along the Y-axis was also criticized, as it had been present in the 2019 port of Deadly Premonition for the Switch. The graphics were similarly panned by some critics.

=== Controversy ===
Lena Dauman, a trans woman, is misgendered and deadnamed by the main character (Francis York Morgan) after a speech about accepting marginalized people.

This led to backlash by the public, a public apology on X by Swery, as well as a patch that later fixed the script.
