= The Missing: J.J. Macfield and the Island of Memories =

2018 video game

- Developer: White Owls Inc.
- Publisher: Arc System Works
- Director: Hidetaka Suehiro
- Artist: Wataru Nishide
- Writers: Hidetaka Suehiro; Shunsuke Ichida
- Composers: kidlit Yuji Takenouchi; Keisuke Morita
- Engine: Unity
- Platforms: Windows, PlayStation 4, Xbox One, Nintendo Switch
- Release: 11 October 2018
- Genre: Puzzle-platformer
- Mode: Single-player

The Missing: J.J. Macfield and the Island of Memories (The MISSING - J.J.マクフィールドと追憶島 -, Za Mishingu - J.J. Makufīrudo to Tsuioku Shima -) is a puzzle-platformer horror video game developed by Hidetaka Suehiro's White Owls Inc. for Windows, PlayStation 4, Xbox One, and Nintendo Switch. It was published by Arc System Works and released on 11 October 2018.

The game's premise is that J.J. Macfield, the player character, is searching for her friend and love interest Emily after she goes missing on a camping trip. After J.J. is struck by lightning, she cannot die and must inflict grisly wounds on herself in order to solve the game's puzzles. Throughout, players unlock text messages that reveal her backstory and her motivation for her self-harm.

== Plot ==
Jackie "J.J." Macfield goes on a camping trip on the mysterious Island of Memories with Emily, her childhood best friend and fellow student at Moosefoot College. Soon after arriving on the island, Emily goes missing during a thunderstorm; while searching for her, J.J. is struck by lightning and after a mysterious humanoid deer appears before her, giving her the power to survive almost any injury and regenerate limbs at will. J.J. journeys across the island in search of Emily, using her new powers to solve puzzles. She is also occasionally pursued by the Hairshrieker, a creature that resembles a monstrous J.J. wielding a giant box cutter, who is also after Emily.

Picking up certain collectibles unlocks text messages that reveal more about J.J.'s life before she came to the Island of Memories. She is hardworking to a fault, well-liked by her peers, and has a strained relationship with her overbearing mother. Through these text messages, the player learns that J.J. is a closeted trans woman; her mother, professors, and fellow students (besides Emily) know her as male. After her mother discovers women's clothing in J.J's closet, J.J. is taken to a counselor who promises to make her "normal" again. Around the same time, other students begin to bully and sexually harass J.J. after she is seen checking out a book about her "condition" from the school library. J.J. begins to self-harm and plans to commit suicide.

Back on the island, J.J. reaches a clock tower where she and Emily used to play as children. Reaching the top, she finds that Emily has hanged herself. Overcome with grief, J.J. hangs herself beside Emily, but does not die due to her regeneration powers. 100 years pass before the rope snaps. After a long fall, she crashes through the roof of the Moosefoot College gymnasium. Climbing to the rooftop, she encounters an alive and well, but enraged Emily, who attacks her with a shotgun. J.J. transforms into a giant Hairshrieker and the two briefly fight before J.J. blacks out and wakes up in a void. J.J. realizes what is happening: her experiences on the Island of Memories have all been a dream, and in reality, she is lying unconscious and near death on the gymnasium floor after attempting suicide. Filled with newfound determination to accept herself for who she is and survive for Emily's sake, J.J. returns to the dream for a final confrontation with the Hairshrieker. After defeating the monster by stabbing it with a lightning rod, J.J. is transported to a field of flowers where she reunites with Emily as the humanoid deer appears again. In the real world, first responders shock J.J. with a defibrillator several times, reviving her. The real J.J. and Emily embrace and promise to never leave each other again.

== Reception ==
Reception

Aggregate score
Aggregator	Score
Metacritic	NS: 74/100; PC: 78/100; PS4: 77/100; XONE: 84/100

Review scores
Publication	Score
Destructoid	7/10
Electronic Gaming Monthly	4/5
Eurogamer	Recommended
Game Informer	8/10
GameSpot	8/10
Hardcore Gamer	3.5/5
IGN	8/10
Nintendo World Report	8/10
Push Square	9/10

The Missing: J.J. Macfield and the Island of Memories received "generally favorable" reviews for Windows, PlayStation 4, and Xbox One, and "mixed or average" reviews for the Nintendo Switch.

Kotaku highlighted the game for being "transgressive and shockingly frank in talking about LGTBQA+ issues". Destructoid considered SWERY to borrow perhaps too heavily from Twin Peaks, but found The Missing appealing as a "brave, subtle, and at times cruel ... adventure featuring gorgeous animation, affecting visuals, and stomach-churning sound effects". EGM awarded the title four stars out of five and praised it for feeling highly personal, writing, "The Missing might be Swery's least ambitious game yet, but that's a good thing. It benefits from having a tighter gameplay focus and a clearer, more emotional message. It's still weird and meta in all the right ways, but underneath the cleverness is clarity and purpose." Eurogamer praised its depiction of social conformity, writing, "The Missing: J.J. Macfield and the Island of Memories is a brutal but beautiful tale that'll stay with you long after you lay down your controller."

The game was nominated for "Games for Impact" at The Game Awards 2018, and won both awards for "Game, Original Adventure" and "Song, Original or Adapted" with "The Missing" at the National Academy of Video Game Trade Reviewers Awards.
