= Thunder Cross II =

1991 video game

- Japanese arcade flyer
- Developer: Konami
- Publisher: Konami
- Platform: Arcade
- Release: JP: August 1991
- Genre: Scrolling shooter
- Modes: Single-player, multiplayer

Thunder Cross II (Note: Japanese: サンダークロス II, Hepburn: Sandā Kurosu II) is a 1991 horizontally scrolling shooter video game developed and published by Konami for arcades. It was only released in Japan in August 1991. It is a direct sequel to Thunder Cross. Hamster Corporation released the game as part of the Arcade Archives series on the Nintendo Switch and PlayStation 4 worldwide in April 2021.

== Gameplay ==
Thunder Cross II is a classic horizontal shooter where players control the Thunder fighter with up to four "options", which arrange up and down vertically and attack at the player's will. Three weapons are selectable and can be upgraded to increase offensive power. End-of-level bosses are present and, typical of a Konami shooter, Thunder Cross II has the player to beat the game twice in a harder loop of the first seven levels.

== Reception ==
In Japan, Game Machine listed Thunder Cross II on their September 1, 1991 issue as being the fifteenth most-successful table arcade unit of the month.
