= Lord of Arcana =

2010 video game

- European cover art
- Developer: Access Games
- Publisher: Square Enix
- Director: Hiroyuki Saegusa
- Designer: Hidetaka Suehiro
- Composers: Nobuo Uematsu; Kenichiro Fukui; Satoshi Henmi
- Platform: PlayStation Portable
- Release: JP: October 14, 2010; NA: January 25, 2011; EU: February 4, 2011; AU: February 10, 2011
- Genre: Action RPG
- Modes: Single-player, multiplayer

Lord of Arcana (ロード・オブ・アルカナ, Rōdo obu Arukana) is an action role-playing game for the PlayStation Portable, developed by Access Games and published by Square Enix. A remake titled Lord of Apocalypse (ロード・オブ・アポカリプス, Rōdo obu Apokaripusu) was released in Japan and Asia in December 2011 for the PlayStation Vita and PlayStation Portable.

== Gameplay ==
Lord of Arcana is an action game that allows up to four players to fight monsters and demons, some of which make cameo appearances from other Square Enix games.

The gameplay is very close to that of the Monster Hunter, God Eater, and Phantasy Star Portable series, featuring cinematic kills and mini-games. Players also have the ability to summon monsters to aid them in battle, and can also use magic (e.g. Fire, Light, etc.) to inflict damage on the enemy.

== Plot ==
Lord of Arcana takes place in a world called Horodyn, named after the land's first king. Somewhere in Horodyn lies an ancient stone known only as "Arcana", which apparently holds great magical power. As well as humans, the world is home to many great and powerful monsters and beasts, which are fought by warriors known as Slayers who seek Arcana.

== Development ==
The monsters featured in Lord of Arcana are designed by many artists from around the world. Hitoshi Sakimoto served as the game's sound producer, with the score being composed by Nobuo Uematsu, Kenichiro Fukui, and Satoshi Henmi.

== Reception ==
Reception

Aggregate score
Aggregator	Score
Metacritic	53/100

Review scores
Publication	Score
Edge	4/10
Eurogamer	5/10
Famitsu	32/40
Game Informer	7/10
GamePro	2/5
GameRevolution	C
GameSpot	4.5/10
GameZone	4.5/10
PALGN	4/10
PlayStation: The Official Magazine	4/10

Lord of Arcana received "mixed" reviews according to video game review aggregator Metacritic. In Japan, Famitsu gave it a score of all four eights for a total of 32 out of 40.
