= Gekisou TomaRunner =

1999 video game

- Developer: Desert Productions (Note: Additional work by Sony Computer Entertainment Japan.)
- Publisher: Sony Computer Entertainment
- Platform: PlayStation
- Release: July 22, 1999
- Genre: Racing
- Modes: Single-player, multiplayer

Gekisou TomaRunner (Note: Japanese: 激走トマランナー, Hepburn: Gekisō Tomaran'nā) is a 1999 racing video game developed by Desert Productions and published by Sony Computer Entertainment for the PlayStation. It was released only in Japan. It was also released on the PlayStation Network for the PlayStation Portable and PlayStation 3 in 2006.

== Gameplay ==
Gekisou TomaRunner is a racing game where the player controls various characters who runs or swims through multiple obstacle courses in a maze of narrow corridors, in a similar manner to Sonic R. The player can dash to increase their speed, but to navigate steep turns they would have to cling to steel bars to regain momentum. Hitting walls instantly loses the player's momentum, with the exception of some panels which allow the player to build up speed. Various obstacles require the player to jump and climb walls, while some steel bars also allow the player to swing and navigate to high places. Weapons and power-ups are available to defeat and avoid enemies or distract other players in the multiplayer mode.

== Legacy ==
Hyde, lead vocalist of L'Arc-en-Ciel, was a big fan of the game, which led to Sony green-lighting a sequel named Gekitotsu Toma L'Arc: TomaRunner vs L'Arc-en-Ciel, released in 2000 only in Japan.
