= Mystic Warriors =

1992 video game

Mystic Warriors: Wrath of the Ninjas
- Arcade flyer
- Developer: Konami
- Publisher: Konami
- Designer: Hideyuki Tsujimoto
- Composers: Junya Nakano; Yuji Takenouchi
- Platform: Arcade
- Release: JP: February 1993; NA: April 1993
- Genre: Run and gun
- Modes: Single-player, multiplayer

Mystic Warriors: Wrath of the Ninjas (Note: ミスティックウォリアーズ -怒りの忍者-, Misutikkuu Woriāzu: Ikari no Ninja; "Mystic Warriors: Wrath of the Ninjas") is a 1993 run and gun video game developed and published by Konami for arcades. It was developed by the same team that produced Sunset Riders and has similar gameplay to its predecessor, along with hack-and-slash elements.

Hamster Corporation released the game as part of their Arcade Archives series for the Nintendo Switch and PlayStation 4 in December 2023.

== Gameplay ==
A screenshot of snowboarding Yuri in the game's snow mountain stage

The game's controls consists of an eight-way joystick and two buttons for attacking and jumping. Like in Sunset Riders, the player can jump between higher or lower levels, as well as slide. The player character attacks primarily by shooting an unlimited supply of shurikens/daggers, or using his/her weapon at close range. The game includes some improvements that were not included in Sunset Riders, such as the ability for players to change characters after they lose a credit as well as a life gauge that allows the player to sustain up to four hits from enemy attacks before losing a life.

The player must defeat box-carrying enemies in order to obtain power-up items. These include a shuriken power-up that can increase the player's shooting power by up to two levels (which differ between characters), food (sushi, tempura, udon, sukiyaki) that will replenish the player's life gauge, a blue orb with the kanji shinobi (忍) that will surround the player with a barrier for a limited period, a yellow orb with the kanji chikara (力) that will destroy all on-screen enemies, and various kinds of jewelry for extra points and temporary invincibility.

There are a total of nine stages in the game, in which its own boss awaits to challenge the player. Like in Sunset Riders, each player is graded at the end of a stage by how much they shot the boss; the player with the highest hit percentage will receive bonus points.

== Plot ==
Mystic Warriors is set in a dystopian future in New York (this is notable due to the World Trade Center being seen in some stages and the castle in the eighth stage's west 42nd Street sign), where an evil organization known as the Skull Enterprise has taken over the nation and plots a worldwide takeover. The player takes control of one of five young ninja who are being targeted by Skull forces: Spyros, Keima, Kojiro, Brad, and Yuri.

The game can be played by up to two or four players (depending on the game's configuration); after each player chooses their character, one of the remaining members of the group will get kidnapped (if four of the five are chosen instead, the last remaining character will be captured), prompting the remaining four to begin their mission. During their journey across several regions of Japan, the four ninja eventually find and rescue their kidnapped friend, but their reunion is short-lived, and the rescued ninja soon performs a sacrificial move to free them from an electric trap, dying in the process. The rest of the game is spent with the remaining ninja avenging the death of their fallen comrade.

After defeating the Skull forces, the four remaining ninja mourn for the loss of their companion before returning home.

== Soundtrack ==
The complete soundtrack to Mystic Warriors is featured in the two-CD album Konami Amusement Sounds '93: Summer Edition, which was released on August 21, 1993, with the catalog number KICA-7616-7. Tracks 23–46 on Disc 2 are from the game.

== Reception ==
In Japan, Game Machine listed Mystic Warriors on their April 15, 1993 issue as being the ninth most-successful table arcade unit of the month.
