= Hidetaka Suehiro =

Japanese video game designer (born 1973)

- 末弘 秀孝
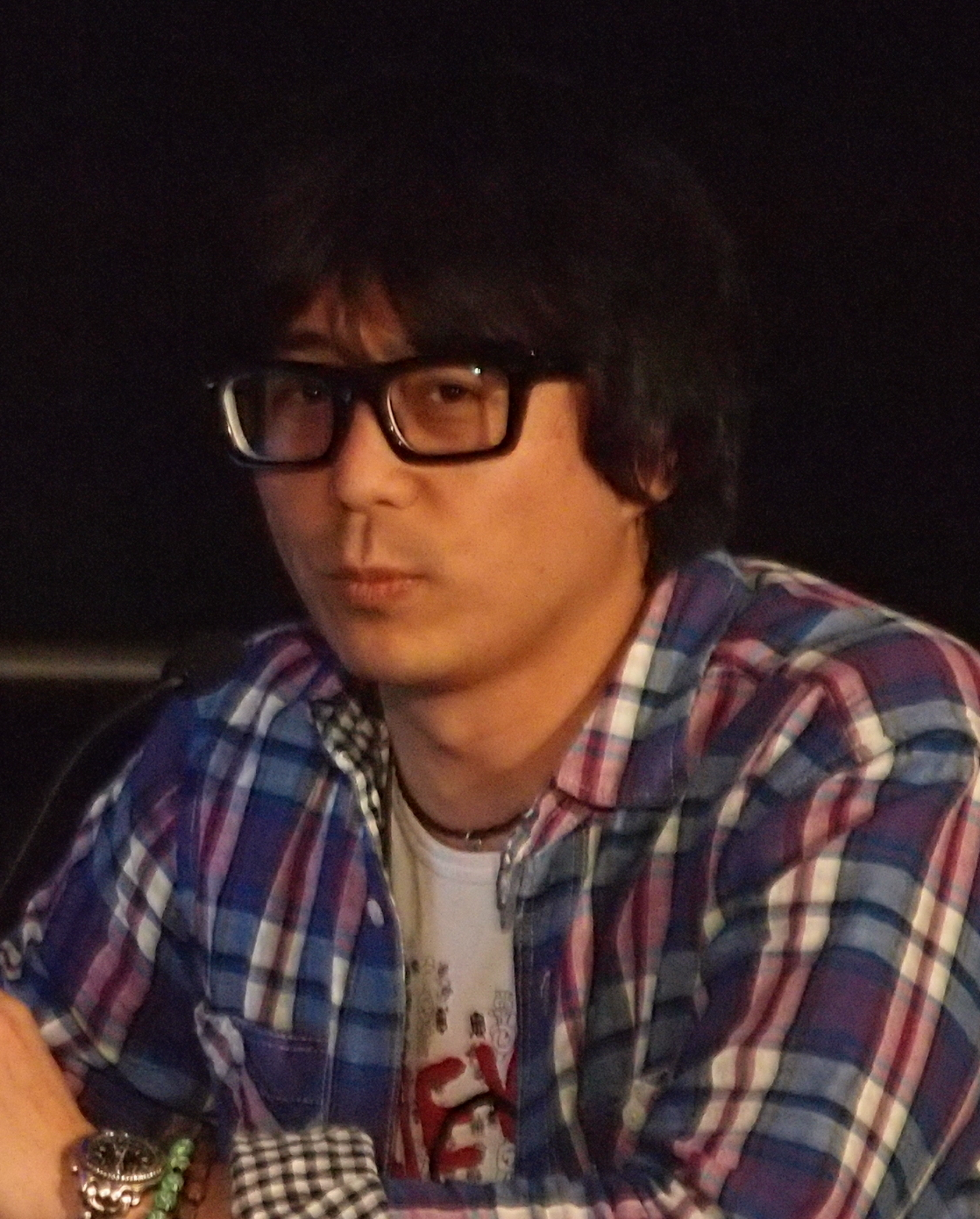
- Suehiro in 2011
- Born: 14 April 1973 (age 53); Osaka, Japan
- Other names: SWERY, Swery65
- Occupations: President and CEO of White Owls Inc. Video game producer, scenario writer, game designer, Buddhist monk

Hidetaka Suehiro (末弘 秀孝, Suehiro Hidetaka; born 14 April 1973), known as SWERY or Swery65, is a Japanese video game designer and writer. He was one of the founding members of the game development studio Access Games which is based in Osaka. His roles in the company included director, designer, and writer. His best-known work include the games Spy Fiction, Deadly Premonition, and D4: Dark Dreams Don't Die. He then left Access Games in 2016 and founded his own studio, White Owls Inc.

== Early and personal life ==
Born from Buddhist monks, Swery lived in a temple in his childhood. He first got his monk license in high school, but only became a certified Buddhist monk in 2016 within Jōdo Shinshū Buddhism. Suehiro received a degree in film and video advertising at Osaka University of Arts. He decided against pursuing a career in the film industry, as he felt it was "very conservative". In November 2015, he announced that he would be taking a health-related break from game development in order to focus on recovering from reactive hypoglycemia. Swery is often called the DrinKING, posting numerous photos of him with alcoholic beverages. Sharapova, a stuffed toy monkey, is Swery's "partner". Swery brings him everywhere in his travels. He has a yakuza-styled back tattoo with his name and Sharapova at the center.

== Career ==
Swery decided to join the game industry after graduation and worked at various game companies including SNK. At SNK, he wrote the scenarios to Kizuna Encounter: Super Tag Battle, The Last Blade and The Last Blade 2. In January 2002 he was one of the founding members of Access Games. The first game he directed was the PlayStation 2 game Spy Fiction released in 2003. The game is a third-person military themed stealth game and the target audience was Western players rather than Japanese players. Production began in 2004 on a game titled Rainy Woods, which was then cancelled in 2007. Work was restarted under the new title Deadly Premonition and it was released in 2010. A survival horror game, it also placed emphasis on targeting Western gamers rather than Japanese players. That game made its way to the 2012 Guinness World Records Gamer's Edition with the title "Most Critically Polarizing Survival Horror Game" because reviews of the game ranged so heavily. In 2014, he partnered with Microsoft to develop an Xbox One game titled D4: Dark Dreams Don't Die, which utilizes the Kinect motion-sensing device. The game was highlighted at GDC Next 2013 as one of their "GDC Next 10", where chosen developers give talks on the inspiration behind their upcoming games. In 2015, he gave a lecture in Osaka and at GDC 2015 regarding physical input in video games and the Kinect device. He also opened a booth along with Access Games at Penny Arcade Expo East 2015. On 31 October 2016, he announced his departure from Access Games. A new video game studio was later founded by Suehiro on 1 November 2016 as White Owls Inc. White Owls was formally revealed to the public on 15 January 2017. Suehiro is a good friend of fellow game creator Goichi Suda. Appearing on a livestream in 2019, the pair revealed they worked on a cancelled PlayStation VR game together, after which they decided to collaborate on a horror title. Just before the stream, Suda titled it Hotel Barcelona, and both envisioned a "light and easy to play" game for mobile platforms or Nintendo Switch. In 2023, it resurfaced as a slasher film parody action game for consoles and PC. Death Game Hotel was released for Meta Quest in July 2024, with Suehiro credited for the original concept. In 2024, Suehiro received the Trailblazer Award at IndieCade Festival 2024. Hotel Barcelona was released for PlayStation 5, Windows, and Xbox Series X/S in September 2025.

== Works ==
Year	Title	Developer	Platform	Role
1996	Kizuna Encounter: Super Tag Battle	SNK	Arcade	Scenario
1997	The Last Blade	SNK	Arcade	Scenario
1998	The Last Blade 2	SNK	Arcade	Scenario
1999	Tomba! 2: The Evil Swine Return	Whoopee Camp	PlayStation	Designer
2001	Extermination	Deep Space	PlayStation 2	Writer/Planner
2003	Spy Fiction	Access Games	PlayStation 2	Writer/Director
2009	Kidō Senshi Gundam: Senjō no Kizuna Portable	Access Games	PlayStation Portable	Director
2010	Deadly Premonition	Access Games	Xbox 360, PlayStation 3	Co-writer/Director/Designer
2010	Lord of Arcana	Access Games	PlayStation Portable	Co-writer/Designer
2012	Lord of Apocalypse	Access Games	PlayStation Portable, PlayStation Vita	Co-writer/Designer
2013	Deadly Premonition: The Director's Cut	Toybox Inc., Access Games	PlayStation 3, Windows	Director/Designer
2014	D4: Dark Dreams Don't Die	Access Games	Xbox One, Windows (2015)	Writer/Director
2018	The Missing: J.J. Macfield and the Island of Memories	White Owls Inc.	Nintendo Switch, PlayStation 4, Xbox One, Windows	Writer/Director
2019	Deadly Premonition: Origins (Switch Remaster)	Toybox Inc.	Nintendo Switch	Director/Designer
2020	Deadly Premonition 2: A Blessing in Disguise	Toybox Inc., Now Production, White Owls Inc.	Nintendo Switch, Windows (2022)	Co-writer/Director
2021	The Good Life	Grounding, White Owls Inc.	Nintendo Switch, PlayStation 4, Xbox One, Windows	Co-writer/Director/Producer
2021	Dear Ambivalence: The Mustachioed One, the Witches, and the Suspended Body	Atelier Third	Novel	Author
2024	Death Game Hotel	White Owls Inc.	Meta Quest; Windows (2025)	Original concept
2025	Hotel Barcelona	White Owls Inc.	PlayStation 5, Windows, Xbox Series X/S	Producer/Director; original idea and supervisor by Goichi Suda
