= Extermination (video game) =

2001 video game

- North American cover art
- Developer: Deep Space (Note: Additional work by Sony Computer Entertainment Japan.)
- Publisher: Sony Computer Entertainment
- Director: Yuzo Sugano
- Designer: Hidetaka Suehiro
- Programmer: Yukio Arai
- Artists: Takafumi Nakata; Shinya Nakai
- Writer: Yuzo Sugano
- Composer: Motoki Funayama
- Platform: PlayStation 2
- Release: JP: March 8, 2001; PAL: June 8, 2001; NA: July 24, 2001
- Genre: Survival horror
- Mode: Single player

Extermination (Note: Japanese: エクスターミネーション, Hepburn: Ekusutāminēshon) is a 2001 survival horror game developed by Deep Space and published by Sony Computer Entertainment for the PlayStation 2. It was used as a showcase for the system at trade shows before its release. The game was considered the first survival horror release for the PS2 and generated some hype amongst critics, but it received mixed reviews.

There are significant differences between the European and North American versions of the game including a redesign of the main protagonist, and entirely rerecorded dialogue using different voice actors. Former members of the development team joined Access Games.

== Gameplay ==
Extermination is a survival horror game, and as such players are encouraged to run whenever they can. This idea is reinforced by the fact that ammunition is limited for the main character's weapons (unlimited ammo refills are located in very few places), and most enemies, especially the larger or human descended types, typically take a lot of damage before being defeated. Another element of survival horror that holds true is that ammo for special weapons (such as the shotgun, flamethrower, grenade launcher, and the rocket launcher) is limited from the get-go.

The game also features an infection system. Along with a conventional health bar, there is also an "Infection Rate". Enemies in the game have the potential to both deal damage to Dennis' health and raise his Infection Rate. When the rate reaches 100%, Dennis becomes completely infected by the virus, and his maximum health is not only reduced to 60%, but also constantly depletes. Additionally, things that would usually not harm Dennis (i.e. infected puddles) or would only infect him now inflict damage. This can be fought against using a special machine called the MTS Bed, located in certain areas of the game, which cures the infection and restores his health to full, but this also requires an MTS vaccine, a limited item. If Dennis' health reaches zero when infected, he will mutate into a creature and die, the results of which are game over.

Dennis is equipped with a Special Purpose Rifle, or "SPR-4" assault rifle, a weapon traditionally given to the armed forces in the game's setting. This weapon is highly customizable and can be fitted with gadgets such as a zoom scope, flashlight grip, radar, and parts which convert it to different types of weapons such as a flame thrower, shotgun, or rocket launcher. Dennis also has a Combat Knife and can do either a single strong slash or multiple weak slashes. Another unique factor in Extermination's gameplay is the "Battery Pack". Found near the beginning of the game, Dennis uses this rechargeable battery to activate various machinery, and execute functions common to most video games such as saving the game. The battery pack can be upgraded to hold more power by collecting cells found in various locations around the Fort.

== Plot ==
Extermination takes place on December 24, 2005, at a top secret American research facility in Antarctica. The game focuses on U.S. Marine Corps' Force Recon member Sergeant Dennis Riley, as part of "Team Red Light". His squad receives a distress call from the aforementioned base named Fort Stewart. The distress call requests an immediate air strike on the base. Instead, Team Red Light is sent in via C-17 to investigate. En route, the plane malfunctions, scattering the team and crashing into the tundra. All are ordered to regroup at Ground Facility Building B.

Dennis and teammate Roger Grigman arrive outside the fort. They enter the fort through the ventilation shaft. After discovering that it "looks like a battlefield," Roger is attacked by Hydras (in the North American release, these enemies are referred to as "Bugs"). He becomes infected and rapidly mutates in front of Dennis. A woman in a contamination suit arrives and fires at Roger, seemingly killing him. She throws Dennis an extra magazine for his rifle and a MTS vaccine. Thereafter, she orders him to tell his team to escape the fort.

Dennis pursues the woman, who has initiated a lock-down protocol. Eventually, he gets the door open and finally meets the woman face-to-face without her mask. The woman is Cindy Chen, whom Dennis was concerned about when coming to Fort Stewart. She was the girlfriend of Dennis' fallen comrade, Andrew, whom he served with in Cambodia. She has not spoken to Dennis since she received the news during that tour of duty.

Cindy tells Dennis that the Marines must leave the fort as soon as possible and to "tell your government that their dirty little secret has become a nightmare." Dennis heads toward Building B and is stopped by a journalist named Travis Miller, who reveals in conversation that he has been undercover for five years, then gives Dennis his card.

At Building B, Dennis encounters Major Mike Madigan, who briefs Dennis on the situation thus far. He says that the Pentagon's decision is to now destroy the facility. To that end, three detonators need to be manually activated. Madigan remarks that he has already dispatched a few members of the team, but they had trouble. The remainder of the team witnesses a mutated human drinking from a water tower. After taking it down, the water inside the tower moves around as though alive, but just when it attacks, it freezes in place. Madigan sends Dennis off, alone, to activate the detonators.

Inside Building B, a woman named Sonja Leone tells him that the area holding the detonators can be unlocked from Building B with metal tags. Upon arrival, Cindy tells Dennis to leave her alone. Dennis, knowing full well why she is so dismissive, is irritated and tells Cindy: "On that day Andrew sacrificed his life to save mine. Now I've sworn to protect yours, no matter what happens."

Dennis receives a distress call from a Team Red Light marine. Dennis picks up their trail only to find them dead. He acquires the metal tag, and heads to the Level 2 detonator center. He has another run-in with Miller, who says that he has all the evidence and information that he needs, and is on his way out. Miller is not seen or heard from for the remainder of the game. Although, in journals scattered throughout the game, it is revealed that others escaped with Miller from Antarctica.

Dennis comes across a wounded Marine, Gary. Giving Dennis a metal tag and later heading on to Building B, Dennis radios the number to Cindy, and he recollects the earlier battle with the humanoid mutant on the water tower and how the water had frozen as it reached out. Dennis continues to the Level 1 detonator center and uncovers documents revealing that this plague is caused by a bacterium dubbed HO213, and grows rapidly on contact with water. Further testing revealed that all traces of the bacteria strain are wiped out when the master strain is destroyed. Once the detonator is activated, Dennis radios Cindy who immediately informs him of Sonja's recent disappearance, later found dead.

Dennis and Cindy deduce that the bacterium is susceptible to cold. The cold itself will not actually destroy it, rather preserve it in a state of cryogenic suspension. However, if the master strain (Origin) were to be destroyed, the strain would die out on its own. HO213 requires a certain temperature in order to be incubated. The infested water heading towards the coolant is where Major Madigan and his team is heading. Their goal was to sabotage the coolant reactor, letting H0213 freeze out to temporarily buy time. Dennis rushes to his team's aid.

On the way, Dennis comes across an injured Filel, (Note: The game had the character's name spelled and pronounced Filel at first, and then it was changed to Felil mid-game.) who in his last moments tells Dennis that Madigan had shot him. Later, Dennis receives a communique from Madigan, instructing him to regroup. Seconds later, a scream is heard.

Dennis takes the elevator to Madigan's position, and defeats a hideously mutated Roger. Dennis comes across a gravely injured Madigan, who tells him that Felil was a CIA agent and the only person who was supposed to come back alive. Madigan reveals that he knew about the bacteria the entire time, and was given a secret objective by the government to destroy it. Other factions in the government, such as the CIA, ordered Felil to preserve the bacteria. Madigan takes on the suicidal task of delivering the explosive to the coolant reactor, but not before leaving Dennis the new leader of Team Red Light.

Meanwhile, back in Building B, Gary tells Cindy that he was there when Andrew had died, mentioning that "The fighting was so fierce that Dennis couldn't even bring back his body." Cindy confesses that when Dennis had informed her, she said things to Dennis she later came to regret. However, each time she had seen Dennis, she could not bring herself to apologize. Cindy and Gary agree that they are relying on Dennis to help them come out alive, and resolve to support him.

Dennis arrives in Building B and hands Cindy the disk given to him by Madigan. Cindy deciphers it, whereupon she learns that project "Extermination" is a test of H0213's potential. Everybody in the facility, including the Marines, are "guinea pigs" to the experiment, both to test infection against civilians and fighting capabilities when engaging the Marines. Soon, Dennis activates the last detonator and hurries back to Cindy and Gary who have boarded an LCAC Carrier.

The facility explodes, and the master DNA strain Origin takes the form of a gigantic aquatic creature, and chases the LCAC holding the trio. Dennis mans the machine guns on the vessel and takes down Origin's fish form. It changes form twice more, and Dennis destroys it once and for all.

After a brief conversation over the victory, Cindy apologizes to Dennis about the things she said to him. Dennis assures her that it is alright, as he also hated himself for never being able to help her. He continues to say: "So from now on if you ever need anything from me, you let me know and I'll be there. This time, I promise..."

== Development ==
The development of Extermination was initially helmed by Tokuro Fujiwara (a general producer of the original Resident Evil game)'s company Whoopee Camp prior to its dissolution.

The beta version used polygonal character models prior to the changes made to non-polygonal models.

== Reception ==
Reception

Aggregate score
Aggregator	Score
Metacritic	67/100

Review scores
Publication	Score
AllGame	3/5
Edge	7/10
Electronic Gaming Monthly	5.67/10
Famitsu	31/40
Game Informer	8.25/10
GamePro	2.5/5
GameRevolution	C
GameSpot	7.1/10
GameSpy	73%
GameZone	6.9/10
IGN	6.9/10
Next Generation	3/5
Official U.S. PlayStation Magazine	2.5/5
Maxim	4/5

Extermination received "mixed or average" reviews from critics, according to review aggregator website Metacritic.

Reviewers from both GameSpot and IGN praised the game for offering some originality to the genre, making some minor improvements over similar gameplay found in Resident Evil, the soundtrack and suitable graphics. However, they criticized the sometimes awkward, straightforward gameplay and voice acting, and how the game did not really offer anything that could top other survival horror releases. Chester "Chet" Barber of NextGen called it "a solid, fast-paced action game with only a few problems." In Japan, Famitsu gave it a score of 31 out of 40.

Reviewers noted that the storyline and setting were reminiscent of John Carpenter's 1982 science fiction horror film The Thing, while some noted resemblances between Ennio Morricone's soundtrack for the film and the music present in Extermination. Other comparisons included Carrier, Resident Evil, and the water effects similar to those from the film The Abyss (1989).
