= Access Games =

Japanese video game planning company

Access Games Inc.
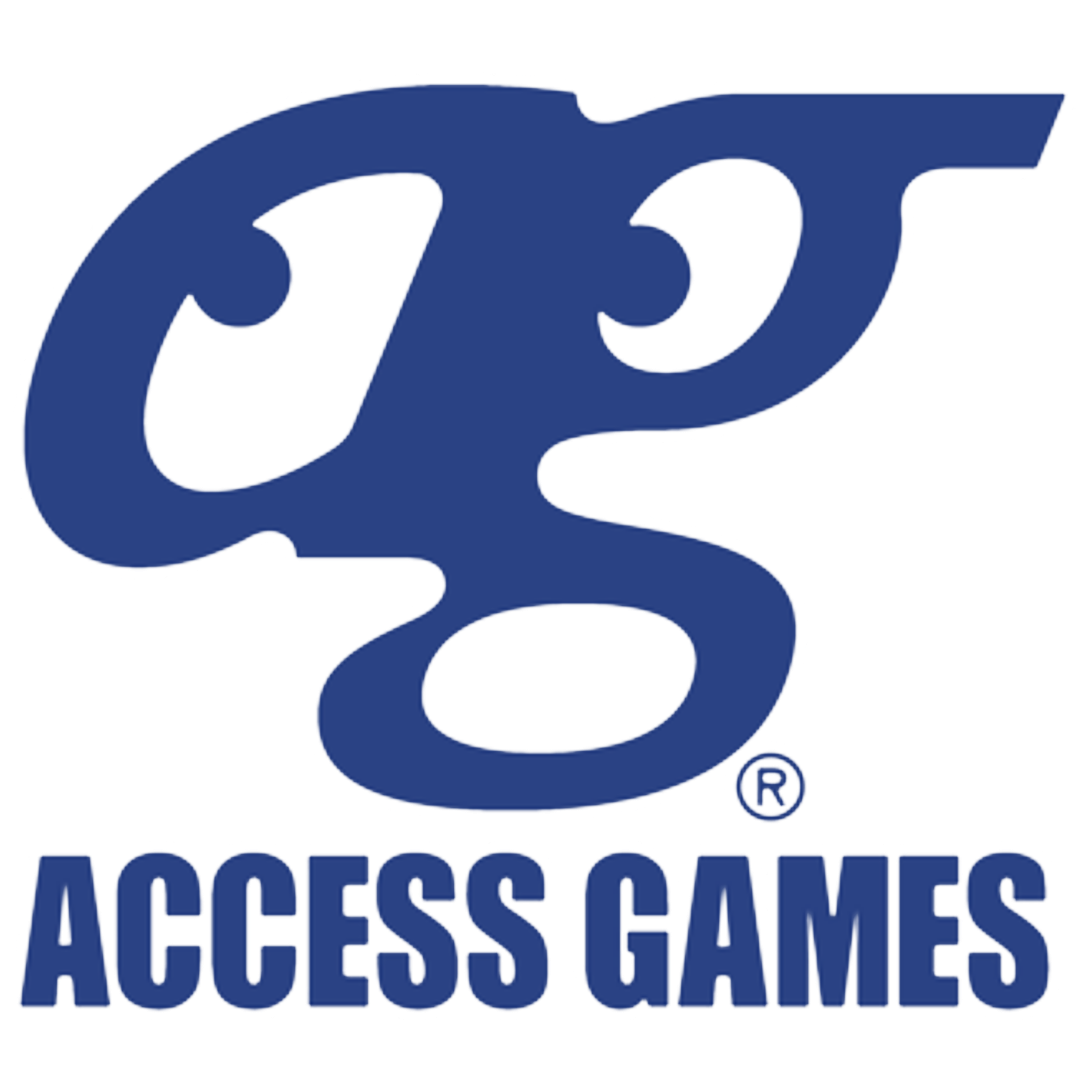
- Native name: 株式会社アクセスゲーム
- Romanized name: Kabushiki gaisha Akusesu Gēmu
- Type: Kabushiki gaisha
- Industry: Information technology, Video games
- Founded: May 30, 1996; 30 years ago
- Headquarters: Chūō, Tokyo, Japan
- Parent: Digital Media Lab
- Website: www.accessgames.co.jp

Access Games Inc. (株式会社アクセスゲーム, Kabushiki gaisha Akusesu Gēmu) is a Japanese company specializing in the planning, development and distribution of video games and the research, development and distribution of software, data and video media. The company was originally founded in 1996 as a computer graphics producer.

Access Games primarily specializes in action-adventure games and combat flight simulators.

== History ==
On January 16, 2002, the company launched a game development division and re-established itself as primarily a video game company. On September 30, 2003, Access Games became a wholly owned subsidiary of Digital Media Lab, in turn a subsidiary of Kaga Electronics.

Much of the company's employees had been members of Whoopee Camp and its transitional group Deep Space who joined following the release of Extermination.

== Organization ==
AG's main office is located in Chūō, Tokyo, but the company's development departments are located in Chūō-ku, Osaka.

=== Staff ===
Hidetaka "SWERY" Suehiro notably cofounded the company and worked as the writer and director of Spy Fiction and Deadly Premonition.

== Games ==
Year	Title	Publisher	Platform
2003	Spy Fiction	JP: Access Games; NA: Sammy Studios; EU: Sammy Studios	PlayStation 2
2006	Ace Combat X: Skies of Deception	Namco: EU: Sony Computer Entertainment	PlayStation Portable
2008	The Sky Crawlers: Innocent Aces	JP/EU: Namco Bandai; NA: Xseed Games	Wii
2009	Mobile Suit Gundam: Senjō no Kizuna Portable	JP: Bandai Namco Entertainment	PlayStation Portable
2009	Sengoku Basara: Battle Heroes	JP: Capcom	PlayStation Portable
2010	Deadly Premonition	NA: Ignition Entertainment; JP: Marvelous Entertainment; EU: Rising Star Games	Xbox 360, PlayStation 3
2010	Ace Combat: Joint Assault	WW: Bandai Namco Entertainment	PlayStation Portable
2010	Lord of Arcana	WW: Square Enix	PlayStation Portable
2011	Sengoku Basara: Chronicle Heroes	JP: Capcom	PlayStation Portable
2011	Ace Combat: Assault Horizon Legacy	WW: Bandai Namco Entertainment	Nintendo 3DS
2011	Lord of Apocalypse	WW: Square Enix	PlayStation Portable, PlayStation Vita
2012	Sengoku Basara HD Collection	JP: Capcom	PlayStation 3
2013	Deadly Premonition: The Director's Cut	JP: Marvelous Entertainment (PlayStation 3); WW: Rising Star Games; EU: Mastertronic (PC)	PlayStation 3, Microsoft Windows
2014	Drakengard 3	WW: Square Enix	PlayStation 3
2014, 2015	D4: Dark Dreams Don't Die	WW: Microsoft Studios (Xbox One); WW: Playism (PC)	Xbox One, Microsoft Windows
2015	Ace Combat: Assault Horizon Legacy Plus	WW: Bandai Namco Entertainment	Nintendo 3DS
2015	Devil May Cry 4: Special Edition	WW: Capcom	PlayStation 4, Xbox One, Microsoft Windows
2016	Sengoku Basara: Sanada Yukimura-Den	JP: Capcom	PlayStation 3, PlayStation 4
2019	Final Fantasy VIII Remastered	WW: Square Enix	PlayStation 4, Xbox One, Nintendo Switch, Microsoft Windows
2020	Mega Man Zero/ZX Legacy Collection	WW: Capcom	PlayStation 4, Xbox One, Nintendo Switch, Microsoft Windows
