= List of Made in Abyss episodes =

First season key visual, featuring Reg (left) and Riko (right).

Made in Abyss is a Japanese anime television series based on the manga series of the same name written and illustrated by Akihito Tsukushi. The anime television series adaptation was announced in December 2016. The 13-episode series aired from July 7 to September 29, 2017, on AT-X, Tokyo MX, TV Aichi, Sun TV, KBS Kyoto, TVQ, Saga TV, and BS11., and covers content from volumes 1 through 3. The final episode was a 1-hour long special. The series was directed by Masayuki Kojima and written by Hideyuki Kurata, with animation by Kinema Citrus and character designs by Kazuchika Kise. Australian artist Kevin Penkin composed the soundtrack for the anime. Miyu Tomita and Mariya Ise performed both the opening theme "Deep in Abyss" and the ending theme "Tabi no Hidarite, Saihate no Migite", the latter in collaboration with Shiori Izawa). The first season premiered on Adult Swim's Toonami programming block starting on January 16, 2022.

Two compilation films, titled Made in Abyss: Tabidachi no Yoake (メイドインアビス 旅立ちの夜明け; "Journey's Dawn") (encompassing episodes 1–8 with new scenes for introduction) and Made in Abyss: Hōrō Suru Tasogare (メイドインアビス 放浪する黄昏; "Wandering Twilight") (encompassing episodes 9–13), were released on January 4, 2019, and January 18, 2019, respectively. A sequel was announced at an event in November 2017.

Following the release of the first compilation films, the sequel was revealed to be a film titled Gekijōban Made in Abyss: Fukaki Tamashii no Reimei (劇場版メイドインアビス 深き魂の黎明, Made in Abyss the Movie: Dawn of the Deep Soul). The film premiered in Japan on January 17, 2020. The film had been set to premiere in the United States at Anime Boston on April 11, 2020, before that convention's cancellation due to the COVID-19 pandemic. Regular theater showings in the U.S. had been planned for April 13 (English dub) and 15 (English subtitles).

Following the release of Dawn of the Deep Soul, a new sequel has been announced. On May 5, 2021, it was announced that the sequel is a second season, officially titled Made in Abyss: The Golden City of the Scorching Sun (メイドインアビス 烈日の黄金郷, Made in Abyss: Retsujitsu no Ōgonkyō), which aired from July 6 to September 28, 2022. The main cast and staff reprised their roles. The opening theme is "Katachi" by Riko Azuna while the ending theme is "Endless Embrace" by Myth & Roid.

A sequel to The Golden City of the Scorching Sun was announced on January 15, 2023.

Sentai Filmworks has licensed the series, and streamed it on Amazon's Anime Strike service in the U.S. and on Hidive outside of the U.S. Sentai has since released it on home video with an English dub. MVM Films has acquired the series for distribution in the UK and Ireland, and Madman Entertainment has acquired the series for distribution in Australia and New Zealand. Sentai Filmworks has licensed the two compilation films, and screened the first film at Regal Cinemas in Los Angeles on March 15, 2019, with a subtitled theatrical release on March 20, 2019, and an English-dubbed theatrical release on March 25, 2019, in collaboration with Fathom Events. During its panel at Anime Expo on July 5, 2019, Sentai Filmworks announced that they had acquired the license for Dawn of the Deep Soul. Sentai Filmworks planned to screen the film in North America, the United Kingdom, and Ireland with English subtitles on April 13, 2020, subtitled, and with the English dub on April 15, 2020, however, the screenings were postponed due to the COVID-19 pandemic. Sentai Filmworks also acquired the second season for distribution worldwide except Asia, France, Germany, Italy and Middle East and North Africa, and will stream it on select digital outlets.

== Series overview ==
Season	Episodes	Originally released	
Season	Episodes	First released	Last released
1	13	July 7, 2017	September 29, 2017
2	12	July 6, 2022	September 28, 2022

== Episodes ==
=== Season 1 (2017) ===
No. overall	No. in season	Title (Note: All English titles are taken from Anime Strike.)	Directed by	Written by	Original release date	English air date	Ref.
1	1	"The City of the Great Pit"; Transliteration: "Ōana no Machi" (Japanese: 大穴の街)	Hitoshi Haga	Hideyuki Kurata	July 7, 2017	January 16, 2022	
While delving into the first layer of the Abyss to search for relics, Riko and her partner Nat become separated. Spotting a beastly serpent called a crimson splitjaw nearby, Riko uses her Red Whistle to draw its attention in order to save Nat from being eaten. Despite Riko getting cornered by the crimson splitjaw to the point of almost becoming devoured, the crimson splitjaw is suddenly chased off by a powerful energy blast. Riko traces the source of the energy blast back to a robot boy rendered unconscious. Riko and Nat carry the robot boy back to their home at Belchero Orphanage, stashing him away in a shed. Later, the Director makes a clear statement to the orphans that relics generate income for the orphanage, while instructor Jiruo tells Riko that she is not ready to be assigned into the lower layers of the Abyss at her current level. At nighttime, with the help of her friends, Riko is able to revive the robot boy, who seems to be amnesiac. Riko names the robot boy Reg and escapes from Jiruo's watchful eye, taking Reg outside during sunrise to show him the large city of Orth, which sits atop the Abyss.
2	2	"Resurrection Festival"; Transliteration: "Fukkatsu-sai" (Japanese: 復活祭)	Satoshi Mori	Hideyuki Kurata	July 14, 2017	January 23, 2022	
Believing that Reg came from the bottom of the Abyss, Riko, Nat, Shiggy and Kiyui fail to find a robot boy within the illustrated compilation of recovered relics. Fearing that Reg might be taken away and dismantled if he was ever found out, the others disguise him as a regular orphan and discreetly arrange his enrollment with Jiruo in the orphanage, where he begins his rank training as a Bell. Two months later, Habolg, a Black Whistle Cave Raider, returns from his expedition in the second layer of the Abyss with a White Whistle owned by Riko's mother Lyza as well as a sealed document. As a festival is celebrated for the return of Lyza's White Whistle, Jiruo tells Riko that she was born in the Abyss, in which Lyza used a rare relic called the Curse-Repelling Vessel to return Riko safely to the surface before searching for the legendary relic called the Unheard Bell. Riko is then given Lyza's White Whistle and is allowed to view the sealed document, which reveals a drawing of Reg and a note from Lyza saying that she is waiting at the bottom of the Abyss.
3	3	"Departure"; Transliteration: "Shuppatsu" (Japanese: 出発)	Sun Hi Son	Hideyuki Kurata	July 21, 2017	January 30, 2022	
Riko decides to descend into the Abyss in order to find Lyza. However, Nat openly opposes this idea, believing that Riko will never return to the surface by doing so. When Reg does his first delve as a Red Whistle with Nat into the first layer to search for relics on the next day, Reg believes that he will find answers to his own identity and lost memories in the Abyss by joining Riko. While Riko and Reg plan to sneak out of the orphanage before daybreak, Shiggy gives them a map of the Abyss, containing all six known layers. Riko is angered when Nat points out that Lyza most likely died a long time ago, since it would be impossible for even a White Whistle to survive in the Abyss for ten years. When Nat later goes missing, Reg looks for him in Kiyui's room. After seemingly bluffing a suspicious Jiruo, Reg reunites with Riko and Shiggy outside. They are met by Nat, who regrets previously saying such hurtful things. Nat agrees to guide them to the wharf quarter, a secret entry point into the Abyss. After saying their goodbyes, Riko and Reg depart for their journey.
4	4	"The Edge of the Abyss"; Transliteration: "Abisu no Fuchi" (Japanese: アビスの淵)	Shinya Iino	Keigo Koyanagi	July 28, 2017	February 6, 2022	
Riko and Reg manage to descend deep down into the first layer, the Edge of the Abyss. After eating freshly caught demonfish for breakfast, Riko loses her Star Compass, a relic previously recovered, as it drops down a waterfall. Reg then shows Riko a letter that was slipped into his backpack. It contains a copy of vital information about the Abyss, as well as a note from Jiruo warning them that they will be pursued at dawn. Riko concludes that they will not be pursued if they can reach the second layer. As Riko and Reg escape the territory of a silkfang, a large insect, they are intercepted by Habolg. He was requested by Nat and Shiggy to escort Riko and Reg to the Seeker Camp in the second layer. However, Riko kindly declines the offer since she and Reg want to reach the Seeker Camp on their own. Habolg informs Riko and Reg that the guardian of the Seeker Camp is Ozen, a White Whistle who helped Lyza transport the infant Riko to the surface, though warning them to be wary of Ozen before saying his farewells. Riko and Reg then reach the second layer, the Forest of Temptation.
5	5	"Incinerator"; Transliteration: "Kasō Hō" (Japanese: 火葬砲)	Toshiharu Kudō	Keigo Koyanagi	August 4, 2017	February 13, 2022	
As Riko and Reg proceed through the Forest of Temptation, they encounter a large carnivorous bird called a corpse-weeper, which can mimic the cries of help from its prey. When Riko is captured by another corpse-weeper and flown to its nest to be fed to its chicks, Reg desperately activates an incendiary cannon within his hand that destroys the corpse-weeper and a large swathe of the surrounding landscape. After being saved, Riko is greatly impressed with Reg's incendiary cannon and dubs it the Incinerator. However, Reg passes out from the strain of using the weapon. After Reg wakes up, Riko reveals that she lost her notebook, which contains all her writings during her time in the Abyss. After sharing some delicious meat of the corpse-weeper that was left behind, Riko and Reg proceed to the Inverted Forest, found in the lowest area in the Forest of Temptation. They are soon chased off by several red-eyed gibbons called inbyos, which are very territorial. Riko and Reg then approach the Seeker Camp, which was originally built as a stopover point for Cave Raiders. When Reg tries to use his extendable arms to gain entry, Ozen seizes hold of Reg's extendable arms instead.
6	6	"Seeker Camp"; Transliteration: "Shīkā Kyanpu" (Japanese: 監視基地(シーカーキャンプ))	Hitoshi Haga	Keigo Koyanagi	August 11, 2017	February 20, 2022	
Ozen releases Reg's extendable arms and lowers a gondola, allowing Riko and Reg inside the Seeker Camp. After finally meeting Ozen and her apprentice Marulk, Riko thanks Ozen for carrying her to the surface long ago, though Ozen amusingly points out that she had considered abandoning Riko many times. Ozen lends Blue Whistles to Riko and Reg in exchange for Lyza's White Whistle. Riko and Reg quickly befriend Marulk, who became a Blue Whistle at a young age due to being a direct apprentice of Ozen. After Riko is fascinated by old relics stowed away, Marulk wishes that Riko and Reg can stay a bit longer so they can delve together. However, Riko reluctantly declines since her mission is to find Lyza at the bottom of the Abyss. That night, Riko encounters a strange creature while looking for the bathroom, having to flee back to her bedroom. The next morning, Ozen takes Riko and Reg to her private chamber. Along the way, Ozen says that Lyza is dead, since she recovered the letter from a grave in the fourth layer, also claiming that the note was not handwritten by Lyza. Once inside the chamber, Riko sees the Curse-Repelling Vessel.
7	7	"The Unmovable Sovereign"; Transliteration: "Fudō Kyō" (Japanese: 不動卿)	Shinya Iino	Hideyuki Kurata	August 18, 2017	February 27, 2022	
Ozen reveals that the Curse-Repelling Vessel has the power to temporarily revive the dead, in which Riko died from birth and was revived by the relic. The strange creature that Ozen had placed inside there earlier was just a lump of meat, returning to life before dying again a few hours later. An angry Reg begins attacking Ozen, but she remains unmoved and soon renders him unconscious from her superhuman strength. Reg is awakened by the Subterranean Bandits (Simred, Yelme and Zapo), thanks to Marulk calling them in. Ozen admits that she was testing Riko and Reg to surmise if they can survive in the Abyss, concluding that they need training. She also reveals that the grave was in fact empty, implying that Lyza may be still alive. A flashback shows when Ozen mentored Lyza from a Red Whistle to a Black Whistle. Following Reg's recovery, Ozen tasks Riko and Reg to survive in the outer edge of the Inverted Forest for ten days. Because it would leave Riko and Reg defenseless, Ozen suggests for Reg to use the Incinerator as a last resort, since he would faint within minutes and remain unconscious for two hours.
8	8	"Survival Training"; Transliteration: "Seizon Kunren" (Japanese: 生存訓練)	Shinya Iino	Hideyuki Kurata	August 25, 2017	March 6, 2022	
After Ozen leaves Riko and Reg to fend for themselves, the two quickly find aquatic insects called rohanas, which only live in clean water. After setting up camp, Riko and Reg spend the next five days struggling to capture an ottoba, a large amphibious animal. After ten days, Riko and Reg successfully complete their survival training and return to the Seeker Camp. Ozen instructs Riko and Reg to avoid the other White Whistles currently exploring the fifth layer. Ozen then notices that the note handwritten by Lyza was done on a strong fabric that not even Ozen can tear apart, another sign that Lyza must be indeed alive. Ozen gives Riko a relic called the Blaze Reap, Lyza's abnormally large pickaxe that was salvaged from the fourth layer, which can be sparingly used before breaking as an alternative to the Incinerator. Ozen then shares the secrets of the Abyss accessible only to the White Whistles. Later on, Marulk and the Subterranean Bandits bid farewell to Riko and Reg. Ozen reminisces about the promise that she made to Lyza long ago, which was to help Riko find Lyza. Riko and Reg set off towards the third layer, the Great Fault.
9	9	"The Great Fault"; Transliteration: "Dai Dansō" (Japanese: 大断層)	Hitoshi Haga	Hideyuki Kurata	September 1, 2017	March 13, 2022	
Riko and Reg climb down the Great Fault, using countless interlocking caverns to avoid the inhibiting madokajacks, large aerial predators that are reptilian creatures with an insect-like appearance. However, they stumble into a den of a madokajack, which forces Reg to use the Incinerator to kill it. Unfortunately, this attracts the attention of the crimson splitjaw previously wounded by the Incinerator. After narrowly escaping, Reg falls unconscious, leaving Riko to fend for herself. As a hungry Riko drags Reg along, she is lured in and swallowed by an amakagame, a bulbous creature, having to cut her way out of its stomach using a dagger. Riko then flees from a swarm of neritantans, flat rodent-like creatures, finding herself in a cavern with an upward slope. As she heads up the slope, she starts experiencing vertigo and hallucinations, the Curse of the third layer. After reaching the top of the cavern, Riko realizes the importance of Reg as both her friend and protector. Reg awakens just as the crimson splitjaw returns, and he uses the Blaze Reap to chase it off. After setting up camp in the cavern, Riko and Reg can now see the fourth layer, the Goblets of Giants.
10	10	"Poison and the Curse"; Transliteration: "Doku to Noroi" (Japanese: 毒と呪い)	Sun Hi Son	Keigo Koyanagi	September 8, 2017	March 20, 2022	
Riko and Reg travel in the Goblets of Giants, a humid jungle filled with flat creepers, which are weaving giant concave discs. They are soon confronted by an orb piercer, a large porcupine-like animal. After Riko reveals that the orb piercer's quills can penetrate steel and are laced with poison, Riko and Reg try to escape. However, the orb piercer predicts their movements and halts them, knocking the Blaze Reap out of their grasp. The orb piercer even uses its quills to penetrate through a relic called the Scaled Umbrella, breaking Reg's defense, and one quill penetrates Riko's left hand, which injects lethal poison into her body. This forces Reg to escape with her by ascending, though Riko begins to bleed from every orifice, the Curse of the fourth layer. Riko urges Reg to sever her left arm in order to prevent the poison from going further, in which he hesitantly complies. Riko stops breathing midway through the process, causing Reg to fall into despair. A mysterious rabbit-like being tells Reg to remain calm, guiding him to perform cardiopulmonary resuscitation and getting Riko to breathe again. Riko and Reg retreat to the hideout of the being, whose name is Nanachi.
11	11	"Nanachi" (Japanese: ナナチ)	Toshiharu Kudō	Keigo Koyanagi	September 15, 2017	March 27, 2022	
In the hideout, Nanachi begins patching up Riko's swollen left hand, admitting to watching and listening to Reg until Riko was badly injured ever since they both entered the Goblets of Giants. Reg is then introduced to Mitty, a misshapen cat-like creature living with Nanachi, who reveals that both of them are Hollows, young Cave Raiders who have lost their humanity as a result of the Curse of the sixth layer from the strains of ascension, although Nanachi exhibits proof of surviving and retaining a semblance of humanity. Nanachi sends Reg off to fetch ingredients to heal Riko as well as to make Nanachi's dinner. Nanachi seems to recognize Lyza's White Whistle that Riko kept with her. Reg fetches a demonfish, the giant eggs of a hammerbeak, some yellow-shining grass and a shroombear infected with parasitic water shrooms. Nanachi then sends Reg to clean Riko's clothes, stained with blood and urine, at a riverbank behind Nanachi's hideout. Reg walks among the eternal fortunes, which are perennial plants that grow fast, and a memory resurfaces of him standing by a gravestone with the Blaze Reap in the ground. While Riko is left alone, Mitty begins to eye her.
12	12	"The True Nature of the Curse"; Transliteration: "Noroi no Shōtai" (Japanese: 呪いの正体)	Masayuki Kojima	Keigo Koyanagi	September 22, 2017	April 3, 2022	
In Orth, Kiyui falls ill to a mysterious plague known as the Birthday-Death Disease, rumored to affect citizens on their birthdays. Jiruo takes Kiyui to the Caravan Fleet, a boat anchored in the bay surrounding the Abyss, for medical treatment. When Kiyui's symptoms suddenly disappear, pharmacist Mio muses that it reminded her of the bizarre Curse of the Abyss. Back in the Abyss, Mitty has apparently become emotionally attached to Riko, but Nanachi assures Reg that Mitty will not harm Riko. After dinner, Nanachi uses a relic called a fog weave, a thin piece of cloth, to demonstrate the true nature of the Curse of the Abyss. The force field is weaker away from the vertical shaft, and creatures like the orb piercer can predict the actions of their prey. During a training session with Nanachi in the Goblets of Giants, Reg comes across a Black Whistle Cave Raider being attacked by the orb piercer. Thanks to Nanachi's instructions, Reg is able to chase off the orb piercer with the Incinerator. Reg then asks the Black Whistle to tell Jiruo that both he and Riko are continuing their adventure. When Reg returns, Nanachi surprisingly requests for Reg to kill Mitty.
13	13	"The Challengers"; Transliteration: "Idomu Monotachi" (Japanese: 挑む者たち)	Satoshi Mori	Hideyuki Kurata	September 29, 2017 (Note: One hour season finale special.)	April 10, 2022	
Once Reg recovers from using the Incinerator, Nanachi reveals she and Mitty were orphans brought to the abyss, by the White Whistle Bondrewd, as subjects for his cruel experiments, in a facility at the bottom of the fifth layer named Ido Front. Unaware of Bondrewd's intentions, Nanachi and Mitty were sent together down into the miniature Garden of Dawn of the sixth layer, named "Capital of the Unreturned", and afflicted by the Curse upon their ascension; leading to their current appearances making Mitty immortal and Nanachi able to "see" the curse. After Bondrewd attempted to kill Mitty several times, Nanachi escaped with Mitty, but has since been unable to end her suffering themselves. After hearing Nanachi's story, Reg reluctantly accedes to Nanachi's request to kill Mitty; begging Nanachi not to harm herself afterwards. After Nanachi bids a final farewell to Mitty, Reg completely annihilates her, with Nanachi wailing in grief shortly after. Riko regains consciousness the next day, having pan-fried Demonfish for breakfast with Reg and Nanachi. Riko recalls being able to "communicate" with Mitty in her slumber, and felt her soul being freed upon her death. After spending some time at a natural hot spring with Reg and then having the parasitic water shrooms painfully removed from her left hand, Riko asks Nanachi to join the quest in finding Lyza, in which Nanachi agrees. Before leaving the hideout, Riko, Reg and Nanachi prepare preserved medicines, sort delving equipment, procure water-repellent materials, rehabilitate Riko's arm, construct a support and complete a new backpack. Meanwhile, their letter sent via mail balloon is eventually received by Nat and Shiggy on the surface. It is revealed that, at Ido Front, Bondrewd had been surveilling Mitty and Nanachi through their "life signatures". After seeing that Nanachi somehow managed to kill Mitty, he anticipates her arrival.

=== Theatrical film trilogy (2019–20) ===
No.	Title	Directed by	Written by	Original release date
1	"Made in Abyss: Journey's Dawn"; Transliteration: "Made in Abyss: Tabidachi no Yoake" (Japanese: メイドインアビス 旅立ちの夜明け)	Masayuki Kojima	Hideyuki Kurata	January 4, 2019
This film is a compilation of episodes 1 through 8 of the first television season with exclusive scenes added for the introduction, revealing the origin of the Abyss and the city of Orth about 1,900 years ago. It covers the period from when Riko descends into the Abyss with her robot companion Reg, journeying into the second layer where they meet the White Whistle Ozen, who reveals vital information about Riko's mother Lyza.
2	"Made in Abyss: Wandering Twilight"; Transliteration: "Made in Abyss: Hōrō Suru Tasogare" (Japanese: メイドインアビス 放浪する黄昏)	Masayuki Kojima	Hideyuki Kurata	January 18, 2019
This film is a compilation of episodes 9 through 13 of the first television season. Riko and Reg descend to the third layer, where they work together to defeat a crimson splitjaw. They then journey into the fourth layer, where Riko's left hand is injured by an orb piercer and Reg tries to save her. Nanachi comes to their aid and saves Riko's poisoned left hand. Reg is asked by Nanachi to kill Mitty. Nanachi then joins Riko and Reg in their quest to reach the bottom of the Abyss.
3	"Made in Abyss: Dawn of the Deep Soul"; Transliteration: "Made in Abyss: Fukaki Tamashii no Reimei" (Japanese: メイドインアビス 深き魂の黎明)	Masayuki Kojima	Hideyuki Kurata	January 17, 2020
Riko, Reg, and Nanachi travel deep into the Goblets of Giants and reach the Garden of the Flowers of Resilience, eventually encountering an underling of the White Whistle Bondrewd called an Umbra Hand, who momentarily sets the field ablaze to destroy the amaranthine-deceptors, green parasitic insects that have migrated from the sixth layer. The trio continue to the fifth layer of the Abyss, the Sea of Corpses, where they eat raw hamashirama, a bizarre fish, before reaching Ido Front, the only gateway into the sixth layer. They are greeted by Prushka, Bondrewd's garrulous adoptive daughter, while Bondrewd himself invites them to stay overnight. Before bedtime, Nanachi tells Reg that he has three more uses of the Incinerator left, according to the glass lens of his helmet. While Nanachi later goes snooping and encounters Bondrewd in the hallway, Reg is shown to be captured in a laboratory by the Umbra Hands, who sever Reg's right hand during an experiment. While searching for them, Riko begins to ascend a forbidden staircase, leading to complete sensory deprivation and confusion, the Curse of the fifth layer. After regaining consciousness from falling, Riko is found and bandaged by Prushka. They ascend the staircase together after a whiff of the fur of Prushka's pet Meinya. Nanachi, Riko, Prushka and Meinya all arrive and save Reg from the Umbra Hands. With Prushka's help, Riko, Reg and Nanachi escape by boat, but Bondrewd soon find the three in the sandstone region of the fifth layer. Riko springs a trap set by Nanachi, while Bondrewd and the Umbra Hands are attacked by a colony of huge seven-tailed scorpions called Stingerheads. Bondrewd uses Sparagmos, a relic that generates a mysterious blade of light, to blast his way free. Reg drags Bondrewd into the ocean and swiftly back onto land, causing Bondrewd to suffer from the Curse and his body to be malformed beyond repair. However, another Umbra Hand takes Bondrewd's White Whistle and helmet and becomes Bondrewd. After subduing Reg and Riko, Bondrewd explains to Nanachi that the Abyss also grants the phenomenon called the Blessing, which is fueled through love. Later on, Prushka is dismembered in the laboratory by Bondrewd. Riko realizes from a heartfelt dream about Prushka that Bondrewd possesses a rare relic called Zoaholic, which can allow him to disperse his consciousness into his Umbra Hands. Formulating a plan for Reg to recharge using the electricity powering Ido Front, Riko and Nanachi follow Meinya to a storage room full of cartridges, specialized packages made from the flesh and essence of humans. Suddenly discovered by Bondrewd, he reveals to them that he used his original body to create his White Whistle. Bondrewd is interrupted when a fully charged and out of control Reg breaks into the room and mounts a ferocious attack against Bondrewd while destroying everything around him indiscriminately. He is brought back to his senses by Nanachi but is dragged down into the Miniature Garden of Dawn by an Umbra Hand. There he faces off against Bondrewd once more while Nanachi guides Reg to the surface as the water bastion from above collapses around them. As Bondrewd chases Reg upwards, his body is fully transformed through the Curse of the sixth layer. In order to protect himself, Bondrewd uses the Blessing, ejecting all the profusely bleeding cartridges, including that of Prushka. Working together, Riko, Reg, and Nanachi manage to defeat Bondrewd, with Riko using Reg's severed Incinerator to cut Bondrewd's body in half. As his current body expires, Bondrewd praises Nanachi and reveals that his new aspiration is for Nanachi to push forward. A distraught Riko is finally relieved after finding out that Prushka's consciousness has been converted into a Life Reverberating Stone, the material that White Whistles are cut from. Now entrusted with Prushka as her new White Whistle, Riko begins her last dive to the sixth layer, the Capital of the Unreturned, with Reg, Nanachi, and Meinya.

A four-part series of short films, called "Marulk's Daily Life", was produced along the third movie Made in Abyss: Dawn of the Deep Soul and shown before the movie's screenings in Japan. These short films include Marulk running a small errand with the help of Nat, as well as Marulk having a recollection of his scary past which reveals his first heartwarming encounter with Ozen.

=== Season 2: The Golden City of the Scorching Sun (2022) ===
No. overall	No. in season	Title (Note: All English titles are taken from Hidive.)	Directed by	Written by	Original release date	English air date	Ref.
14	1	"The Compass Pointed to the Darkness"; Transliteration: "Rashinban wa Yami o sashita" (Japanese: 羅針盤は闇を指した)	Masayuki Kojima	Hideyuki Kurata	July 6, 2022	November 6, 2022	
In the apparent distant past, a young girl named Vueko escaped her abusive guardian and joined an expedition of pilgrims called the Ganja led by Wazukyan and Belaf to search for the mythical Golden City at the bottom of the Abyss. Using a special compass Vueko possesses, the Ganja were able to find the island the Abyss is located on despite all but one of their ships being lost in a storm. After negotiating with a native tribe where Vueko reluctantly traded her compass for information, the Ganja continued on their journey. They encountered a native girl who had been exiled from the tribe for being infertile. Vueko took pity on the girl and Wazukyan agreed to allow her to accompany them as their guide. As The Ganja delved deeper into the Abyss, they learned about the Curse and fought their way past many monsters until they reached a transport pod at the Ido Front in the fifth layer, which allowed them to proceed onwards to the sixth layer. In the present, (Note: Directly after the events of the film Gekijōban Made in Abyss: Fukaki Tamashii no Reimei (劇場版メイドインアビス 深き魂の黎明, Made in Abyss the Movie: Dawn of the Deep Soul).) Riko, Reg, and Nanachi activate the transport pod with Riko's newly acquired White Whistle and it transports them down through the Sea of Corpses, an underground ocean filled with the bones and corpses of deceased wildlife. Due to the length of the trip and the uncertainty of the sixth layer, Reg recommends that Riko relieve herself inside the relative safety of the pod. Afterwards, the pod reaches its destination, and the trio exit and take their first steps into the sixth layer, the Capital of the Unreturned.
15	2	"Capital of the Unreturned"; Transliteration: "Kaerazu no Miyako" (Japanese: 還らずの都)	Yūki Koike	Hideyuki Kurata	July 13, 2022	November 13, 2022	
Fascinated by the sixth layer, Riko, Reg, and Nanachi do some exploring and find that the layer has a hot, desert-like environment littered with numerous ruins, and is also populated by extremely dangerous wildlife. Wanting to let Nat and the others know she's okay, Riko attempts sending another mail balloon to the surface, but it is quickly intercepted by flying wildlife. All the while, the trio are quietly observed by a mysterious being. The next day, Riko wakes up to find that her White Whistle has been stolen. Nanachi discovers clues left behind by the thief, who was able to recover the mail balloon, and sneak into their camp without alerting any of them. Reg picks up the scent of the thief and they follow it until they reach a large structure with a single entrance. With no other leads, the trio enters the structure, whose entrance is protected by a force field that repels the Curse. The mysterious being continues to watch them. Inside the structure, the trio find a village populated by what are apparently Hollows. One of them, Majikaja, greets the trio and agrees to take them to Riko's White Whistle.
16	3	"Village of the Hollows"; Transliteration: "Narehate Mura" (Japanese: 成れ果て村)	Hitoshi Haga	Hideyuki Kurata	July 20, 2022	November 20, 2022	
Majikaja takes Riko, Reg, and Nanachi to a craftsman who is carving Riko's White Whistle into a new shape that can utilize its full power. He then shows the trio the rest of the village, which is protected from the curse, but the Hollows that live within it cannot leave. He also explains that the village runs on the trade of "value". As they further explore the village, one of the Hollows picks up Meinya and plays too roughly with it, injuring Meinya. Riko's distress at Meinya's injury causes the village's defense system to activate, which takes the offending Hollow's possessions and even some of its organs to compensate Riko for Meinya's lost value. Riko uses this newfound value to rent a room at an inn, but she falls ill due to rotten food. Reg and Nanachi then witness a commotion outside, and Majikaja explains that Faputa, the Princess of Hollows, has appeared outside the village. Realizing Faputa must have been the one to bring Riko's White Whistle to the village, Reg heads to the village entrance where he encounters Faputa and her robotic companion. In the past, the Ganja encountered a group of robotic beings who welcomed them to the sixth layer, one of them was quickly eaten by a monster. Vueko then darkly realized that even though they had reached the Golden City, they were not out of danger yet.
17	4	"Friend"; Transliteration: "Yūjin" (Japanese: 友人)	Motoki Nakanishi; Kōji Furukuwa	Hideyuki Kurata	July 27, 2022	December 4, 2022	
Faputa confronts Reg, and he vaguely recalls that he had previously met her in the past. Wary of eyes of the villagers, Faputa abducts Reg and takes him to her hideout. However, Faputa is confused and hurt that Reg has no memories of her, and expresses her jealousy at Reg accompanying Riko instead. Seeing that he won't learn anything from Faputa, Reg decides to return to the village, but on his way back, he comes across a shower of eternal fortunes and funeral nameplates dropped from Orth, causing him to wonder what is happening on the surface. In the village, Riko recovers from her food poisoning and heads out to search for Reg and Nanachi. Several Hollows attempt to abduct Riko, but she is saved by the Hollow that previously hurt Meinya by accident. Thankful for the help, Riko befriends the Hollow, who she names Maaa. They head over to a restaurant where Riko encounters the Hollow version of Wazukyan. Meanwhile, Nanachi learns from Majikaja that Belaf has Mitty in his custody. In disbelief, Nanachi heads to Belaf's lair where she indeed finds Mitty alive and well, much to her shock. Elsewhere, Vueko appears to be imprisoned along with a number of incomplete Hollows.
18	5	"Concealment"; Transliteration: "Hitoku" (Japanese: 秘匿)	Kōji Furukuwa	Hideyuki Kurata	August 3, 2022	December 11, 2022	
Reg attempts to make his way back to the village, but gets lost and is attacked by monsters. He is saved by Faputa's robotic companion, who explains it is a robot called an Interference Unit, designed to collect data on the Abyss. Reg notes that he and the Interference Unit have similarities, but the Interference Unit admits it has no data on his model. It then guides Reg back to the village, which he says is called Iruburu. At the village, Riko has a brief conversation with Wazukyan, who she finds out is one of the Three Sages, the founders of Iruburu. She then decides to search a cave on the outskirts of the village that the Hollows are too scared to enter, hoping to find Reg and Nanachi inside. However, she instead comes across Vueko, who reveals she was imprisoned for trying to prevent the founding of Iruburu due to its dark origins. Seeing that Vueko can help her, Riko removes Vueko's bonds and has her guide her to Nanachi's location. Vueko leads Riko to Belaf's home, where Riko is shocked to discover that Nanachi traded her own freedom to Belaf to stop him from using Mitty as a food source. Belaf explains that in the past, Bondrewd visited Iruburu and brought Mitty with him. Belaf was so enamored with Mitty that he sacrificed a significant part of his body to create a perfect copy of her. Riko then asks Belaf how much it would cost to buy both Nanachi and Mitty's freedom, and Belaf replies that Riko would either have to give up both her eyes, both of her legs, or half of her internal organs.
19	6	"The Luring"; Transliteration: "Yobikomi" (Japanese: 呼び込み)	Shunsuke Takarai	Hideyuki Kurata	August 10, 2022	December 18, 2022	
Riko considers making the trade, but is stopped by Majikaja and Maaa. As Riko tries to find a way to rescue Nanachi, a monster enters the village and begins attacking the Hollows. Vueko explains it is part of a ritual called the "Luring", where since the villagers cannot leave to hunt, they instead lure monsters inside village. As the battle rages on, Riko recovers her White Whistle, now carved into its true shape. Meanwhile, the battle begins to turn against the villagers, and the restaurant owner, Moogie, warns Riko to stay away. Instead, Riko observes the monster carefully and lays a trap that incapacitates it. However, the monster continues to attack the villagers, including Maaa. Riko is encouraged by Prushka's spirit to blow her White Whistle, which summons Reg and powers him up enough to defeat the monster. Wazukyan congratulates Riko and Reg and suggests to Riko that she obtain a piece of Faputa to trade for Nanachi's freedom. At the inn, Moogie and Majikaja voice their suspicions about Vueko since they don't recall ever seeing her before, and Vueko admits that she is actually one of the original Three Sages who founded Iruburu. She agrees to tell Riko, Reg, and their companions the story behind Faputa and the village's origins, noting that Wazukyan looked terrified after witnessing Reg's power.
20	7	"The Cradle of Desire"; Transliteration: "Yokubō no Yōran" (Japanese: 欲望の揺籃)	Yūki Koike	Hideyuki Kurata	August 17, 2022	January 8, 2023	
Vueko begins to recount her time with Ganja after arriving at the Sixth Layer. Realizing that they could not return to the surface, they resolved themselves to survive in this new environment. Vueko established a parent-like connection with the young tribe girl named Irumyuui, who told her that she was deemed a curse by her family for being infertile, leading to her exile. With time, the Ganja successfully found a water source and learned the means to survive in the Sixth Layer, living comfortably in their new home. However one day, Vueko found Irumyuui and several Ganja severely sick, suffering from diarrhea and body deformations. While fetching more water, Wazukyan found the food survey team dead and deformed, with a small egg-like object in their possession. Soon after, they learned to their horror the water they were drinking was actually a parasitic organism that reproduces upon intake, and that time is short for them to find a cure. They also identified the egg-like object as the Cradle of Desire, a Relic that can grant "the deepest of wishes", though complex ones will result in the deformation of the individual, thus its resonance is stronger with children. As the pseudowater took further effect on Irumyuui, the Sages agreed to give her the Cradle, hoping that her wish would save them all. Irumyuui woke up seemingly better, the Cradle having merged with her. Over time, her body began to mutate and deform further. Then one day, Irumyuui gave birth to a small creature, leading Vueko to realize her wish was to have children. However, the creature was born without internal organs and died soon after. Irumyuui continued to regularly birth and lose her children by the day, bringing her immense grief. Eventually, Vueko found herself succumbing to the pseudowater, but Wazukyan fed her a mysterious broth that miraculously healed her. Wazukyan stated that Irumyuui really did save them all and Vueko realized to her horror that she had just eaten Irumyuui's dead children.
21	8	"The Form the Wish Takes"; Transliteration: "Negai no Katachi" (Japanese: 願いの形)	Motoki Nakanishi	Hideyuki Kurata	August 24, 2022	January 15, 2023	
In the present, Reg meets Faputa again and asks that she provide a body part to help buy Nanachi's freedom. Faputa tears off one of her arms and gives it to Reg, reminding him of his promise to her to help destroy Iruburu and its inhabitants. Back in the past, Irumyuui's body continued to mutate, grow, and give birth, with Wazukyan continuing to take her babies to turn them into food. Vueko was shocked to find out that Wazukyan had given Irumyuui a second Cradle of Desire to further take advantage of her. Eventually, Irumyuui relocated to a different area and began devouring other creatures to sustain herself. Belaf felt guilty about eating Irumyuui's children and offered his body and soul as a sacrifice to Irumyuui and was turned into a Hollow. Inspired by his transformation, the rest of the Ganja followed suit and Irumyuui's own body became the foundation for Iruburu. Meanwhile, Vueko tried to commit suicide, reasoning that Irumyuui's wishes would no longer take effect if she dies. Wazukyan stopped Vueko and imprisoned her inside of Irumyuui's head, where she relegated herself to taking care of the souls of Irumyuui's deceased children. Outside, the second Cradle of Desire allowed Irumyuui to give birth to a perfect child: Faputa. In the present, Vueko concludes her story, explaining that Faputa was born from Irumyuui's rage and despair at being exploited by the Ganja and she is compelled by Irumyuui's wish to have the entire village destroyed. When Riko asks Vueko what she wishes, Vueko replies that she simply doesn't want to forget Irumyuui.
22	9	"The Return"; Transliteration: "Kikan" (Japanese: 帰還)	Hitoshi Haga	Hideyuki Kurata	August 31, 2022	January 22, 2023	
Reg returns to the village with Faputa's arm, now aware that he promised to Faputa to use his incinerator to destroy the shield guarding the village's entrance, which will allow her to enter. As Reg reunites with Riko, Wazukyan arrives to congratulate them. However, Riko surmises that all of the villagers, including Wazukyan, secretly desire to leave the village so they can continue to journey deeper into the abyss, and Wazukyan is trying to carry that out by having Riko use a Cradle of Desire to wish for a way for them to leave. However, as they debate this, the village's guardian Juroimoh awakens to forcibly take Faputa's arm. Wazukyan kidnaps Vueko while Reg is forced to fight Juroimoh. However, Juroimoh proves too difficult for Reg to fight on his own, so he uses his Incinerator, which incapacitates Juroimoh and breaches a hole in the village barrier, allowing Faputa to enter and begin attacking the villagers. Meanwhile, Nanachi awakens from her slumber and Belaf informs her that Faputa has arrived.
23	10	"All That You Gather"; Transliteration: "Hirou Mono Subete" (Japanese: 拾うものすべて)	Takushi Koide	Hideyuki Kurata	September 7, 2022	January 29, 2023	
Nanachi wakes up, having been given Belaf's memories of Faputa. Belaf explains he took in Nanachi to pass on his memories, and releases both Nanachi and Mitty from his service. However, with the village barrier breached, the Curse has entered the village, destroying any villager that touches it. Since this Mitty is a copy created by Iruburu, Nanachi is forced to say goodbye to Mitty for a second time as she dies, and then heads off to find Riko and Reg. Meanwhile, Reg recovers from his coma and wakes to find Faputa has already slaughtered a number of villagers. Riko pleads with Reg to put a stop to Faputa's rampage, and Reg heads out to confront her. Hurt that Reg would renege on his promise, Faputa engages Reg in battle, where she has flashbacks of the first time she met him when he was journeying to the surface. In return for promising to help Faputa enter the village, Reg made Faputa promise to accompany him on an adventure after she was done with her business. Reg has vague recollections of his meeting with Faputa and hesitates in the middle of the fight, once again asking for her to stop her rampage. Faputa however takes the opportunity to attack Reg again.
24	11	"Value"; Transliteration: "Kachi" (Japanese: 価値)	Shunsuke Takarai	Hideyuki Kurata	September 14, 2022	February 5, 2023	
Faputa knocks Reg out and then tries to attack Riko, believing her to be the reason for his amnesia. However, her companion Gaburoon intervenes, shielding Riko and taking heavy damage in the process. Nanachi and Belaf then arrive, with Belaf allowing Faputa to attack him. As she kills him, Belaf transfers his memories of Vueko and Irumyuui to her, wishing for her to find her own value. Faputa is left confused at the new memories she has received, giving the other villagers and Nanachi time to evacuate Riko. However, with the village barrier breached, monsters from the outside begin to enter and attack the villagers. Faputa tries to repel the beasts, but is quickly overwhelmed and left near death while Gaburoon sacrifices itself to protect her. As she lay dying, several villagers come and begin feeding parts of themselves to her, transferring their value to her so she can regenerate herself. Conflicted by this show of compassion by the villagers she's supposed to destroy, Faputa fully regenerates and heads back out to challenge the monsters again.
25	12	"Gold"; Transliteration: "Ōgon" (Japanese: 黄金)	Masayuki Kojima; Hitoshi Haga	Hideyuki Kurata	September 28, 2022	February 12, 2023	
As Faputa fights the monsters, she begins to reminisce about how she first met Gaburoon and how it named her, and taught her how to speak while she helped repair it. Down below, Riko, Reg, Nanachi, and their companions find Wazukyan, who has expended all of his energy and is on the verge of death. He muses how Riko and her friends' journey into the Abyss was the accumulation of numerous circumstances, and wishes them luck before passing away, leaving Nanachi to wonder just how far into the future he has seen. Faputa then summons the remaining villagers to come to her, and the group start making their way back up. On the way, they pick up Vueko, who has begun transforming into a hollow due the Curse infiltrating the village. While Reg holds off the monsters, Faputa asks the remaining villagers to sacrifice themselves to her so she can gain enough power to end Irumyuui's life once and for all. All of the villagers willingly sacrifice themselves with the exception of Majikaja and Maaa, who are tasked by Faputa to make sure Riko, Reg, and Nanachi escape the village. Majikaja and Maa sacrifice themselves to ensure Riko's safety, while Faputa uses her power to completely destroy the village and, by extension, Irumyuui. In the aftermath, Faputa finally has a chance to talk with Vueko, who is now near death. Vueko tells Faputa about what her mother was like as a human, and Faputa reassures Vueko that Irumyuui always loved her, as her memories of Vueko were the one thing she did not give to Faputa. Having found closure and redemption, Vueko passes away from the Curse. After Vueko is buried, Reg suggests to Faputa that she go on an adventure with them, just like he originally promised. While Faputa doesn't immediately accept, she does say that she will consider the offer.
