= List of Made in Abyss volumes =

First volume of Made in Abyss, released in Japan by Takeshobo on July 31, 2013

Made in Abyss is a Japanese manga series written and illustrated by Akihito Tsukushi. It has been serialized in Takeshobo's Web Comic Gamma website since October 2012. Since then, the series has been compiled in 15 tankōbon volumes. Seven Seas Entertainment announced during their panel at Anime Expo 2017 that they had licensed the manga.

A manga anthology, titled Made in Abyss Official Anthology – Layer 1: Irredeemable Cave Raiders (メイドインアビス公式アンソロジー 度し難き探窟家たち, Meido in Abisu Kōshiki Ansorojī: Doshigataki Tankutsuka-tachi), was released on July 29, 2017. On December 13, 2019, Seven Seas announced they had licensed the book, and they released it on October 6, 2020. As of July 2024, a total of five anthologies have been published. The translator of the anime for Sentai Filmworks, Jake Jung, also adapted the manga for Seven Seas. Regarding his involvement in the English version of both media, he stated, "Made in Abyss is chock-full of terminology, so I hope fans of both media are able to enjoy a seamless experience." In addition, he has confirmed his intention to avoid gendered pronouns for both Nanachi and Marulk.

== Volume list ==
No.	Original release date	Original ISBN	English release date	English ISBN
1	July 31, 2013	978-4-8124-8380-0	January 23, 2018	978-1-62692-773-5
1. "Orth: The City of the Great Pit" (大穴の街オース, Ōana no Machi Ōsu); 2. "The Abode of Trees and Fossils" (樹住まいの化石群, Ki Sumai no Kaseki-gun); 3. "Riko's Room: Former Torture Chamber" (元仕置き部屋、リコ私室, Moto Shioki-Beya, Riko Shishitsu); 4. "Belchero Orphanage" (ベルチェロ孤児院, Beruchero Kojiin); 5. "Resurrection Festival" (復活祭, Fukkatsu-sai); 6. "Premonition" (予兆, Yochō); 7. "Eve of Departure" (出発前夜, Shuppatsu Zen'ya); 8. "Here We Go!" (いってきます!, Itte Kimasu!)
2	June 30, 2014	978-4-8124-8716-7	April 24, 2018	978-1-62692-774-2
9. "The Depths' First Layer: The Edge of the Abyss" (深界一層 アビスの淵, Shinkai Issō Abisu no Fuchi); 10. "The Depths' Second Layer: The Forest of Temptation" (深界二層 誘いの森, Shinkai Nisō Sasoi no Mori); 11. "Incinerator" (火葬砲, Kasō-hō); 12. "Lowest Area of the Depths' Second Layer: The Inverted Forest" (二層最下部 逆さ森, Nisō Saikabu Sakasa Mori); 13. "Seeker Camp" (監視基地, Kanshi Kichi); 14. "The Curse-Repelling Vessel" (呪い除けの籠, Noroi Yoke no Kago); 15. "The Unmovable Sovereign" (不動卿, Fudō Kyō); 16. "A Vile Mentoring Method" (ろくでなしの教授法, Rokudenashi no Kyōju-hō)
3	June 20, 2015	978-4-8019-5274-4	July 31, 2018	978-1-62692-827-5
17. "Survival Training" (生存訓練, Seizon Kunren); 18. "The Depths' Third Layer: The Great Fault" (深界三層 大断層, Shinkai Sanzō Dai Dansō); 19. "Poison and the Curse" (毒と呪い, Doku to Noroi); 20. "Nanachi" (ナナチ, Nanachi); 21. "Reg's Memories" (レグの記憶, Regu no Kioku); 22. "The True Nature of the Curse" (呪いの正体, Noroi no Shōtai); 23. "A Dreadful Experiment" (恐るべき実験, Osorubeki Jikken); 24. "Liberation of the Soul" (魂の解放, Tamashī no Kaihō)
4	April 30, 2016	978-4-8019-5516-5	October 23, 2018	978-1-62692-919-7
25. "A Return From Darkness" (闇からの生還, Yami Kara no Seikan); 26. "A Fresh Start" (新たなるスタート, Aratanaru Sutāto); 27. "The Forbidden Field of Flowers" (禁域の花畑, Kin-iki no Hanabatake); 28. "The Entrance to the Sixth Layer" (六層への入り口, Roku-sō e no Iriguchi); 29. "A Fateful Reunion" (運命の再会, Unmei no Saikai); 30. "Unforeseen Peril" (思いがけぬ危機, Omoigakenu Kiki); 31. "Despair and Hope" (絶望と希望, Zetsubō to Kibō); 32. "The End of a Fierce Fight" (激闘の果て, Gekitō no Hate)
5	December 26, 2016	978-4-8019-5720-6	February 26, 2019	978-1-62692-992-0
33. "The True Nature of the Mask" (仮面の正体, Kamen no Shōtai); 34. "Counterattack" (逆襲, Gyakushū); 35. "Clouded Memory" (記憶の混濁, Kioku no Kondaku); 36. "Miniature Garden of Dawn" (黎明の箱庭, Reimei no Hakoniwa); 37. "Flower of Dawn" (夜明けの花, Yoake no Hana); 38. "The Challengers" (挑む者たち, Idomu Monotachi)
6	July 29, 2017	978-4-8019-6011-4	June 4, 2019	978-1-64275-094-2
Side Story #1: "How are you? Somewhere – Reg" (ハウアーユードコカレグ, Hau Ā Yū Doko ka Regu); 39. "Capital of the Unreturned" (還らずの都, Kaerazu no Miyako); 40. "Hollow Husk of Life" (成れ果てし命, Narehateshi Inochi); 41. "The Balancing of Values" (価値の精算, Kachi no Seisan); 42. "Princess of the Hollows" (成れ果て姫, Narehate Hime); Side Story #2: "How are you? Somewhere – Mio" (ハウアーユードコカミオ, Hau Ā Yū Doko ka Mio); Side Story #3: "How are you? Somewhere – Jiruo" (ハウアーユードコカジルオ, Hau Ā Yū Doko ka Jiruo)
7	July 27, 2018	978-4-8019-6339-9	September 17, 2019	978-1-64275-698-2
43. "Approaching Crisis" (迫り来る危機, Semari Kuru Kiki); 44. "Hollows' Restaurant" (成れ果て食堂, Narehate Shokudō); 45. "Captive" (囚われし者, Torawareshi Mono); 46. "The Luring" (呼び込み, Yobikomi); 47. "The Secret of the Village" (村の秘密, Mura no Himitsu)
8	May 30, 2019	978-4-8019-6627-7	March 31, 2020	978-1-64505-217-3
48. "The Compass Pointed to the Darkness" (全ての始まり, Subete no Hajimari); 49. "The Golden City" (黄金郷, Ōgonkyō); 50. "The Cradle of Desire" (欲望の揺籃, Yokubō no Yōran); 51. "The Form the Wish Takes" (願いの形, Negai no Katachi)
9	July 27, 2020	978-4-8019-7029-8	March 30, 2021	978-1-64505-738-3
52. "Faputa's Promise" (ファプタの約束, Faputa no Yakusoku); 53. "Prelude of Disintegration" (崩壊の序曲, Hōkai no Jokyoku); 54. "All That You Gather" (拾うものすべて, Hirou mono Subete); 55. "Faputa and Reg" (ファプタとレグ, Faputa to Regu)
10	July 29, 2021	978-4-8019-7390-9	May 3, 2022	978-1-64827-905-8
56. "A Gift" (贈り物, Okurimono); 57. "Value" (価値, Kachi); 58. "Towards the Path of Flame" (火の道へ, Hi no Michi e); 59. "A Warm Darkness" (温かい闇, Atatakai Yami); 60. "Gold" (黄金, Kogane)
11	July 29, 2022	978-4-8019-7802-7	July 4, 2023	978-1-63858-717-0
61. "You Can Go Anywhere" (どこにでも行ける, Doko ni demo Ikeru); 62. "The Place of Song" (歌の場所, Uta no Basho); 63. "The Curse Fleet" (呪詛船団・プロローグ, Juso Sendan • Purorōgu; Cursed Fleet – Prologue); Side Story #4: "How are you? Somewhere – Cravali" (ハウアーユードコカクラヴァリ, Hau Ā Yū Doko ka Kuravari)
12	July 31, 2023	978-4-8019-8108-9	April 23, 2024	979-8-88843-367-6
64. "Juusou" (獣相, Jūsō); 65. "In the Midst" (ただ中にいる, Tada Naka ni Iru); 66. "Bottom Layer" (最下層, Saikasō)
13	August 30, 2024	978-4-8019-8393-9	March 18, 2025	979-8-89373-261-0
67. "Whereabouts of the Soul" (魂のありか, Tamashī no ari ka); 68. "Maelstrom Danger Zone – Part 1" (渦中厄場 (前編), Kacchaba (Zenpen)); 69. "Maelstrom Danger Zone – Part 2" (渦中厄場 (後編), Kacchaba (Kōhen)); Side Story #5: "How are you? Somewhere – Riko" (ハワユードコカリコ, Hau Ā Yū Doko ka Riko)
14	August 8, 2025	978-4-8019-8710-4	March 31, 2026	979-8-89765-345-4
70: "Little Brother" (兄とでも, Ani to Demo); 71: "Shooter" (射手, Ite); Side Story #6: "How Are You? Somewhere 6 – Tepaste" (テパステ, Tepasute)
15	August 26, 2026	978-4-8019-9031-9	—	—
72: "Window of the Myths" (神話の窓, Shinwa no Mado); 73: "Message" (メッセージ, Messēji); 74: "Just that" (ただそれだけ, Tada sore Dake)

=== Chapters not yet in tankōbon format ===
The following chapters have been published on the Web Comic Gamma website, but have not yet been collected into a tankōbon volume:

== Official anthologies ==
No.	Title	Original release date	English release date
1	Irredeemable Cave Raiders; Doshigataki Tankutsuka-tachi (度し難き探窟家たち)	July 29, 2017; 978-4-8019-6012-1	October 6, 2020; 978-1-64505-737-6
2	A Dangerous Hole; Kiken'na Ōana (キケンな大穴)	March 30, 2020; 978-4-8019-6908-7	June 15, 2021; 978-1-64827-231-8
3	White Whistle Melancholy; Shiro Fue-tachi no Yūutsu (白笛たちのユウウツ)	July 27, 2020; 978-4-8019-7021-2	November 2, 2021; 978-1-64827-564-7
4	It's a Wonderful Abyss Life; Shin'en no Sutekina Nichijō (深淵のステキな日常)	July 29, 2021; 978-4-8019-7391-6	July 19, 2022; 978-1-63858-369-1
5	Can't Stop This Longing; Akogare Wa Tomerarenai (アコガレは止められない)	July 29, 2022; 978-4-80197-803-4	November 7, 2023; 979-8-88843-041-5
