= Beyond the Labyrinth =

2012 video game

- Cover art
- Developer: tri-Ace
- Publisher: Konami
- Director: Takayuki Suguro
- Producer: Shingo Mukaitouge
- Composer: Motoi Sakuraba
- Platform: Nintendo 3DS
- Release: JP: January 19, 2012
- Genres: Action role-playing game, dungeon crawl
- Mode: Single-player

Beyond the Labyrinth (ラビリンスの彼方, Rabirinsu no Kanata) is a dungeon crawler role-playing video game developed by tri-Ace and published by Konami for the Nintendo 3DS handheld video game console. The game revolves around a group of players who have begun playing an online multiplayer game, only to find themselves thrust into a world completely different from theirs. They encounter a girl who has become trapped in this world's Labyrinth, and the two parties must work together to find a way out.

Beyond the Labyrinth has been described as having graphical similarities to the game Ico. The game's combat system blends real-time and action-based gameplay elements together. The soundtrack of the game is composed by Motoi Sakuraba. The game features two well-known voice actors, Haruka Tomatsu and Takehito Koyasu.

== Gameplay ==
Gameplay in Beyond the Labyrinth takes place in a 3D world, with the player controlling their "character"—a group of 4 players, with the main character in control—from a first-person perspective. Exploration takes place in several maze-like areas, which are filled with monsters and items. After the introductory segment, the player is joined by a young girl, whom the player accompanies throughout the game. Although unable to use magic in battle at first, the girl is able to perform actions that the player cannot, such as moving lifts and opening special doors.

Each player's character has a health meter; any attack inflicted upon them will affect only one character at a time, rather than all at once. After the introductory segment, an independent health bar will appear for the young girl. If the main player or the girl lose all of their health, the game is over. In certain areas, the player and the female character can restore their health completely at save points.

=== Battle system ===
The game's battle system combines elements from real-time and turn-based games, as well as incorporating rock-paper-scissors, where three categories of magic attacks—fire, ice, and wind—work against each other in a cycle. In the game, ice (paper) beats fire (rock) beats wind (scissors) beats ice. The group encounters monsters that fall into one of the three categories: fire-based (colored red), ice-based (colored blue), and wind-based (colored green).

The amount of damage the player can inflict depends on the magic types of both the player characters and the enemies. Attacks that are ineffective against a certain type deal half the desired damage; attacks that match the type deal regular damage; and attacks that are effective against the type both deal extra damage and sends this damage "in the air". This damage is based on the character it is taken from, and can be used by either friend or foe to both heal themselves and boost their attack power.

The player(s) can use any or all of the three magic types, based on the elements their characters are set with. There are 10 levels of attack; the higher the level, the longer it will take the player character to recharge for their next turn. At certain points of progress, the young girl will obtain the ability to wield magic in battle, but only when the player can obtain energy for her through certain conditions.

== Story ==
=== Setting and characters ===
The protagonist (and player character) is a new player of the "Beyond the Labyrinth" online RPG, which is styled as an 8-bit dungeon crawler from a first-person perspective. The player is joined by three other players—"Pokira" (ポキーラ), a polite male; "Nerikeshi" (ねりけし), a wise-cracking male; and "LiLy", a sensitive and curious female—all of whom communicate with each other via the game's chat feature. In the world of the Labyrinth, the group encounters an unnamed girl (女の子, On'nanoko) (voiced by Haruka Tomatsu), who fell into the maze-like structure by accident and is looking for a way out. The two parties decide to cooperate to escape the Labyrinth.

=== Plot ===
The game begins with the player beginning to play an online dungeon-crawling RPG titled "Beyond The Labyrinth". While playing with Pokira, Nerikeshi, and LiLy, the player's group begins to hear a voice calling out for help. Suddenly, the 8-bit game world vanishes behind static, and as a different world appears before them in its place, the players encounter a young girl, the one calling for help before, startling each other. Getting over the shock, the girl explains that she fell into the Labyrinth after leaning too far over the edge; luckily, despite the height she dropped from, she landed on top of a healing point (which acts as a save station in-game), which saved her life. Both the girl and players learn that magic is sealed inside the Labyrinth, and many dangerous creatures who use this power reside here.

== Development ==
The game was produced by Shingo Mukaitoge, who led development of Elebits and Dewy's Adventure on the Wii. Takayuki Suguro, director for Valkyrie Profile 2: Silmeria, is the game's director. The game's music was composed by Motoi Sakuraba, who has also produced music for the Star Ocean, Valkyrie Profile and Dark Souls series.

Shortly after the game's announcement, artwork of a young girl was shown, with creators saying the game would revolve around her, though she is not the player character.

== Reception ==
Reception

Review score
| Publication | Score |
|---|---|
| Famitsu | 31/40 |

Famitsu rated Rabirinsu no Kanata 31/40.
