= Akihito Tsukushi =

Japanese manga artist (born 1979)

- つくしあきひと
- Born: Shigeya Suzuki (鈴木茂也); May 5, 1979 (age 47); Sagamihara, Kanagawa, Japan
- Occupations: Illustrator, manga artist
- Notable work: Made in Abyss
- Website: Official website

Shigeya Suzuki (鈴木茂也, Suzuki Shigeya, born May 5, 1979), more commonly known under his pseudonym Akihito Tsukushi (つくしあきひと, Tsukushi Akihito), is a Japanese illustrator, manga artist, and designer from Sagamihara, Kanagawa. Suzuki also goes by the name Ichimi Tokusa (とくさ一味, Tokusa Ichimi).

== Overview ==
Tsukushi hails from the Kanagawa Prefecture, attending Tachibana Gakuen High School before graduating from Tokyo Design Academy in illustration. He worked at Konami from 2000 to 2010 before becoming a freelance illustrator. During his time at Konami, he primarily worked in animation and designing the interface of titles such as Elebits, and the character design for the Nintendo DS game Elebits: The Adventures of Kai and Zero and the anime Otogi-Jūshi Akazukin.

After leaving Konami, Tsukushi began drawing manga, debuting in 2011 in the dōjinshi From Star Strings (スターストリングスより). In 2012, Takeshobo began serializing his manga Made in Abyss (メイドインアビス) on their Web Comic Gamma website. It would later receive an anime adaptation in 2017, and also got a second season in 2022.

His work is characterized by detailed descriptions and narrative drawings. He cites Norman Rockwell as a person he admires.

== Works ==
=== Manga ===
- Made in Abyss (メイドインアビス) (Published by Takeshobo, 15 volumes, 2012–present)
- From Star Strings (スターストリングスより) (Published by Takeshobo, 1 volume, 2017)
- Gears' Maiden (のこぎり怪獣と少女 ) (Doujin, 1 volume, 2008)

=== Anime ===
- Otogi-Jūshi Akazukin (おとぎ銃士 赤ずきん) (Character design) (is credited as Ichimi Tokusa in the OVA)
- The Lost Village (迷家-マヨイガ-) (Nanaki village design)

=== Video games ===
- Elebits and Elebits: The Adventures of Kai and Zero (Fine arts, character design) (is credited as Shigeya Suzuki)
- The Sword of Etheria (OZ -オズ-) (Monster design, character animation) (is credited as Shigeya Suzuki)
- Suikoden III (Motion Design and Event Scene Supervision) (is credited as Shigeya Suzuki)
- LovePlus
- Dewy's Adventure (水精デューイの大冒険!!) (Character design)
- Made in Abyss: Binary Star Falling into Darkness (Original story supervisor)
