= List of Made in Abyss characters =

This is a list of characters for the manga series Made in Abyss.

== Main characters ==
Riko (リコ)
Voiced by: Miyu Tomita (Japanese); Brittany Lauda (English)
Riko is an energetic and trouble-prone 12-year-old girl who wants to emulate her mother, a legendary Cave Raider named Lyza the Annihilator, who disappeared into the Abyss ten years ago. Riko is a Cave Raider-in-training at Belchero Orphanage. Despite strict orphanage policy on turning over all finds to pay for operating costs, she has secretly taken possession of a few of her finds and has swiped at least one valuable relic from the orphanage's Director's office, most notably the Star Compass, which she hopes to use in her exploration of the Abyss. Her mother gave birth to her during a mission in the Abyss. Despite that Riko was stillborn, Lyza and Ozen subsequently brought her back from the depths of the Abyss using a relic regarded as the "Curse-Repelling Vessel". However, as a result of the Curse, Riko wears glasses, as she develops a headache if she does not view the world through a crystal lens.
Reg (レグ, Regu)
Voiced by: Mariya Ise (Japanese); Luci Christian (English)
An amnesiac android resembling a pre-adolescent boy who can display and feel human emotions, possessing a metabolism similar to humans. Reg was named after a dog Riko used to own. His mechanical arms are extensible and can fire a deadly energy beam capable of melting even stone, which Riko dubs the "Incinerator." He wears a metal helmet with two asymmetrical horns protruding out of the sides and what appears to be a glass lens in the front, which, according to Nanachi's theory, displays the number of Incinerator charges he has left to use.
Nanachi (ナナチ)
Voiced by: Shiori Izawa (Japanese); Brittney Karbowski (English)
Nanachi is a Hollow (成れ果て, Narehate) (Note: A person affected by the Curse of the sixth layer, which causes "the loss of your humanity or even death".) with somewhat rabbit-like features. As a human child, Nanachi resided in the slums, scavenging for food and written media, eating from the trash and learning to read ancient glyphs. After initially being recruited by Bondrewd under the implication that they would be trained as Cave Raiders, Nanachi befriends a young girl named Mitty on their descent into the Abyss. Together they are sent down to the sixth layer in one of Bondrewd's experiments. On their return, Nanachi's humanity was partially lost, while Mitty lost all of her humanity and became a grotesque, quasi-immortal assortment of flesh and misshapen limbs. Nanachi escaped with Mitty from Bondrewd's laboratory to spare her the pain of his cruel experiments and then agreed to join Riko and Reg on their travels to the lower layers. The writer has left Nanachi's gender intentionally ambiguous and up to the reader to decide. (Note: In a Tweet, Tsukushi wrote: "Thank you! The gender of Nanachi is unknown. When Nanachi was a human being, there was a gender, but it has not been revealed. Imagine it :)".)
Nanachi also appears in a cameo of the third episode in the second season of Pop Team Epic.
Faputa (ファプタ)
Voiced by: Misaki Kuno (Japanese); Cat Thomas (English)
Faputa is a creature known as the "Princess of the Hollows" who lives in the sixth layer. She met and became close friends with Reg before he lost his memories. When she meets Reg once again, Faputa gets angry at him for forgetting about her and jealous of his friendship with Riko and Nanachi but later befriends the two, joining the group in their quest to reach the bottom of the Abyss.

== Belchero Orphanage ==
Director (院長, Inchō)
Voiced by: Yōko Sōmi (Japanese); Julie Oliver-Touchstone (English)
The director of Belchero Orphanage in the city of Orth. She is quite stern, and has some interesting punishments for children who disobey the rules of the orphanage.
Jiruo (ジルオ) / Leader (リーダー, Rīdā)
Voiced by: Taishi Murata (Japanese); Daniel Regojo (English)
A young assistant instructor ("Moon Whistle") at Belchero Orphanage, who used to be a mentee of Lyza's, caring for Riko after she was born. While he is stern, he is also extremely perceptive and keen-minded, and behind his seemingly uncaring facade he is a compassionate and honest soul. He is commonly called "Leader" by his students. He is currently in his 20s.
Nat (ナット, Natto)
Voiced by: Mutsumi Tamura (Japanese); Shannon Emerick (English)
Nat is one of Riko's friends at Belchero Orphanage. It is hinted that he has feelings for her, as he was the one most firmly against her descent into the Abyss.
Shiggy (シギー, Shigī)
Voiced by: Manami Numakura (Japanese); Terri Doty (English)
Shiggy is another of Riko's friends at Belchero Orphanage. He helped Riko hide Reg's true nature from the adults and like Nat, knew of Riko's plans to search for her mother in the Abyss. Shiggy seems adept at swiping restricted items for his and the group's benefit.
Kiyui (キユイ)
Voiced by: Manami Hanawa (Japanese); Kalin Coates (English)
The youngest orphan at Belchero Orphanage, and one of Riko's friends. Kiyui has yet to reach the status of Red Whistle, so he wears a Bell and takes part in daily chores at the orphanage while the Red Whistles are out training.

== Cave raiders ==
Habolg (ハボルグ, Haborugu)
Voiced by: Tetsu Inada (Japanese); John Swasey (English)
A friendly, familiar Black Whistle who delivered Lyza's White Whistle and final notes to the surface, and supported the two main characters shortly after their departure. He is often visited by Riko and her friends when not out on expedition, and referred to by Riko as "Uncle".
Ozen (オーゼン, Ōzen)
Voiced by: Sayaka Ohara (Japanese); Christine Auten (English)
A White Whistle known as "Ozen the Immovable", in charge of the Seeker Camp on the second layer. She was Lyza's mentor and helped her bring Riko back to the surface after she was stillborn. It is revealed that Ozen cared for Lyza deeply, despite her tough persona, and Ozen promised Lyza to send Riko down to her if the circumstance presented itself. Ozen has embedded numerous relics in her body that grant her enormous vigor and strength. It is also stated by Habolg that Ozen has been delving in the Abyss for at least 50 years. She can appear hunchbacked at times, although she suffers no apparent ill physical effects from her time spent in the abyss.
Marulk (マルルク, Maruruku)
Voiced by: Aki Toyosaki (Japanese); Kelley Peters (English)
A Blue Whistle and Ozen's apprentice, who befriends Riko and Reg during their stay at the Seeker Camp. Marulk looks like a girl and wears a blue maid dress but uses the masculine pronoun boku. It is implied that Ozen forces Marulk to dress this way.
Lyza (ライザ, Raiza)
Voiced by: Maaya Sakamoto (Japanese); Shelley Calene-Black (English)
Riko's mother. She is the former mentee of Ozen's, and one of the few Cave Raiders to obtain the rank of White Whistle, with the title of "Lyza the Annihilator". It is mentioned that she not only conquered many hazards of the Abyss, but also fought raiding parties of foreign nations.
Torka
Riko's biological father, Torka, was a black whistle delver, one level lower than his wife, Lyza. He has been listed as deceased, since he was mentioned to have been killed while he entered the further layers.
Bondrewd (ボンドルド,ボンドルド卿, Bondorudo)
Voiced by: Toshiyuki Morikawa (Japanese); David Harbold (English)
A White Whistle of ill repute, "Bondrewd the Novel" is in charge of Ido Front, a research station located at the bottom of the fifth layer, guarding the gateway to the sixth layer of the Abyss. He is the one responsible for several ghastly experiments on children, including the one which transformed Nanachi and Mitty into Hollows.

== Ido Front ==
Prushka (プルシュカ, Purushuka)
Voiced by: Inori Minase (Japanese); Avery Smithhart (English)
Bondrewd's adopted daughter, who has spent her entire life in the fifth layer. Loves Bondrewd and calls him "Papa". Prushka befriends Riko and desires to help her in her adventure into the Abyss.
Meinya (メイニャ)
Voiced by: Natsuko Hara (Japanese); Juliet Simmons (English)
Meinya is a pet and loyal companion, a rabbit-sized creature called a Meinastilim, which Bondrewd gave to Prushka as a gift when she was much younger and highly traumatized. Sniffing Meinya's fur seems to grant at least temporary immunity to the fifth layer curse by letting the sniffer see and thus follow Meinya's path.

== Sages of Ganja ==
Wazukyan (ワズキャン)
Voiced by: Hiroaki Hirata (Japanese); Brandon Hearnsberger (English)
Captain of the Ganja fleet who prophesied Vueloeluko's arrival.
Belaf (ベラフ, Berafu)
Voiced by: Mitsuki Saiga (Japanese); Ry McKeand (English)
Accompanied Wazukyan and Vueloeluko on their voyage to find The Abyss using the Star Compass as their guide.
Vueloeluko (ヴエロエルコ, Vueroeruko)
Voiced by: Yuka Terasaki (Japanese); Kristen McGuire (English)
Opposed the creation of Ilblu Village after the discovery of The Golden City, and was banished and imprisoned in a dark, sticky pit of mud below the village. She prefers to be called Vueko (ヴエコ) due to her long name.

== Hail Hex ==
Srajo (スラホ, Suraho)
Voiced by: Nana Mizuki
Nishagora (ニシャゴラ)
Voiced by: Akeno Watanabe
Sherumi (シェルミ)
Voiced by: Nao Tōyama
Menae (メナエ)
Voiced by: Yume Miyamoto
Yataramar (ヤタラマル, Yataramaru)
Voiced by: Shunsuke Takeuchi

== Other characters ==
Mitty (ミーティ, Mīti)
Voiced by: Eri Kitamura (Japanese); Monica Rial (English)
A strange, amorphous creature that lives with Nanachi on the fourth layer of the Abyss. In the past, Mitty was a normal human girl with red hair and light skin, recruited with other orphaned children from an unknown area by Bondrewd to descend into the Abyss. She has been friends with Nanachi, since she was portrayed as a kind hearted girl in the series, helping him when he was left out by the other orphans. However, it was short lived, because as a result of being sent to the sixth layer by Bondrewd, she became a Hollow, her appearance somewhat resembling that of a severely misshapen cat with a large mouth, one eye, and a personality similar to that of a friendly dog. The Curse also made her "immortal" and Bondrewd carried out gruesome experiments on her to test her recovery from potentially fatal injuries. Mitty also has the ability to provide antidotes to the Abyss' poisonous creatures, which Nanachi discovered when attempting to end her misery. Following a request by Nanachi to end her misery, she was shot and killed using Reg's incinerator.
