= Elebits: The Adventures of Kai and Zero =

2008 video game

- Developer: Konami
- Publisher: Konami
- Designer: Shingo Mukaitoge (producer)
- Composers: Maki Kirioka; Hiroshi Tanabe
- Platform: Nintendo DS
- Release: JP: December 11, 2008; NA: January 6, 2009; EU: February 20, 2009
- Genre: Action
- Modes: Single-player, multiplayer

Elebits: The Adventures of Kai and Zero (エレビッツ カイとゼロの不思議な旅, Elebits: Kai to Zero no Fushigi na Tabi), known as Eledees: The Adventures of Kai and Zero in Europe, and Elebits: Kai wa Zero Sinbihan Yeohaeng in Korea, is an action video game developed and published by Konami. It is the sequel to the Wii game, Elebits.

== Gameplay ==
Kai and Zero. Kai is catching Elebits.

The Adventures of Kai and Zero is an action game that contains puzzles for the player to solve in order to progress through the game. In the original Elebits game, the player viewed the world in a first-person perspective, but in The Adventures of Kai and Zero, the game uses a top-down perspective to emphasize on puzzles rather than in-game physics. Throughout the game, Kai and Zero travel to several worlds, each with unique experiences and different puzzles to solve. The player's primary objective is to explore the worlds and collect Elebits: small beings that pulse with electricity. Kai can shake trees and lift rocks, which reveals startled Elebits that try to flee, which the player can catch before they disappear. If the player obtains several Elebits within a few seconds, they are rewarded with extra energy depending on how many Elebits they captured within that time frame. The energy that Kai obtains is mainly used to activate doors and elevators and to use the Omega Elebits' abilities.

== Plot ==
The game continues the story from its predecessor, Elebits. In The Adventures of Kai and Zero, Kai makes the Omega Elebit that he found at the end of the last game into his pet and names it Zero. Later, Zero comes across an invention created by Kai's father—a magical bus named G.G—and accidentally charges it up, which sends Kai and Zero into an alternate universe. Every time Kai and Zero use the bus, they are sent to another world. To return to his universe, G.G tells Kai that he needs to get an Omega Elebit; G.G also tells him that Zero is an Omega.

After getting some Omegas, G.G tells Kai that it does not know the way back. A villager says that the village is being ravaged by an Omega, which is the first boss. After defeating it, the mayor of the village provides a map which turns out to be a map between two worlds. With the use of the map, they travel to the Elebit Mine. Kai meets The Pickle Gang, a gang of treasure hunters; it seems that they have lost two members and their Omega. After finding the missing member, Kai is given a map.

Toto provides the map and lets Kai keep their Omega. G.G teleports Kai to a resort-looking beach, where he discovers that a boat got warped here as a result of getting struck by lightning. One of the NPCs will say their world has no Elebits and they depend on energy from wind, water, and other types of fuel. In the ship's basement, Kai finds that they're extracting energy from an Omega and they make it overheat. After fleeing the ship, the captain promises a map if Kai saves his ship. A villager named Arpaka tells Kai that he to find four Omegas to open a gate to get the Omega needed to calm the overheating one down. After getting all five and calming down the overheating one, the captain gives Kai the map.

The next world is snowy. The villagers say that the Snow Queen's children have gone missing and they think she is getting revenge on them by making the climate warmer. The Snow Queen says that it is not her fault that the snow is melting, but her missing children. She awakens Zero's powers and gives Kai a map. Before he can warp, Kai meets a blonde boy who he saw in the previous areas. After fighting him he flees and Kai returns to his home world.

Arriving there he finds that the people are arguing and the Elebits are acting strangely. He runs back to G.G and tells it what happened. The blonde boy from before shows up and provides a map that leads to all worlds that have been visited. He warps Kai to his world, a barren land full of active volcanoes.

The boy's name is Leo and he had an Omega that looked a lot like Zero. Its name is Mobius, who could take away negative emotions and traumatizing memories. That went to his head though and this is what happened to his home. Mobius is now somewhere and Leo tries to find him. After shutting down all the volcanoes, Kai remembers the Mayor in Elebit Forest saying something about a maiden that could connect to the hearts of Elebits like him, and thinks that she may know where Mobius is. After traveling back and talking to the Mayor, who does not give much information, Kai remembers Arpaka saying something along the lines.

Arpaka says there should be a mural about the maiden. Zero reacts to something and a rock cracks open, revealing the map to the Sea Temple.

The maiden sleeps in the temple, but to access it, two pearls are required. After getting the two pearls, the temple opens and Kai is attacked by Omega. After beating the Omega the maiden—Misha—awakens. Mobius' negatives are affecting all worlds. Leo shows up, and says it is his job to find Mobius and clean up his mess. Misha says it is bad for him to do so and tells Kai to go after him to Liybra of Crystal, where Mobius is. She says the Snow Queen should have the map though she needs to be reunited with her children, who turn out to be the Odd-eye Twins, Louie and Lou. After reuniting Louie and Lou to their mother, the Snow Queen, Kai receives the map.

Kai and Zero travel to Liybra of Crystal and stop Mobius, and everything goes back to normal. Kai and Zero return to their world.

== Development ==
Elebits: The Adventures of Kai and Zero was produced by Shingo Mukaitoge, who also produced the original Elebits for the Wii. Mukaitoge wanted to create a sequel to Elebits without the use of the Wii remote because it "[...] wasn't likely to have the same novelty anymore". Kai and Zero was intended to focus more on problem-solving and puzzles using the DS stylus, but still remain true to the original concept of finding and capturing Elebits. The adventure elements within the game are inspired by The Legend of Zelda series.

== Reception ==
Reception

Aggregate score
| Aggregator | Score |
|---|---|
| Metacritic | 75 of 100 |

Review scores
| Publication | Score |
|---|---|
| Famitsu | 31 of 40 |
| GameSpot | 7 of 10 |
| GameTrailers | 7.2 of 10 |
| GameZone | 7.8 of 10 |
| IGN | 7.9 of 10 |
| NGamer | 75% |
| Nintendo Life | 7/10 |
| Nintendo Power | 7 of 10 |
| Nintendo World Report | 8 of 10 |

The Adventures of Kai and Zero received "generally favorable reviews" according to the review aggregation website Metacritic. IGN called the game less ambitious than its predecessor but still praised it as a rewarding game nonetheless. Nintendo Power considered it a "cute, enjoyable diversion" and GameSpot praised it as a "very fun adventure". In Japan, Famitsu gave it a total score of 31 out of 40.
