= Dewy's Adventure =

2007 video game

- Developer: Konami
- Publisher: Konami
- Director: Masaki Yoneyama
- Producer: Shingo Mukaitoge
- Designer: Kazuyuki Kaihō
- Platform: Wii
- Release: JP: July 26, 2007; NA: September 25, 2007; EU: November 23, 2007; AU: December 13, 2007
- Genre: Platform
- Modes: Single-player, multiplayer

Dewy's Adventure (Note: Japanese: 水精デューイの大冒険！！, Hepburn: Suisei Dewy no Daibōken; lit. "Dewy the Droplet's Big Adventure!!") is a platform game for the Wii console by released by Konami. in 2007 It was developed by the same team that developed Elebits, another Wii exclusive.

The player takes control of the main character of the game, Dewy, a young water droplet imbued with the power of the Tree of Seven Colors, who has to set out on a heroic journey to reunite the tree's lost magical fruits, and save his land and its inhabitants, the Eau, from the hands of the evil Don Hedron.

The U.S. version of the game contains advertisements of Nestlé's Aquapod brand of bottled water.

== Gameplay ==
The game features seven worlds with puzzles and enemies. The Wii Remote is utilized to control Dewy and his surroundings. The remote is held horizontally and tilted to move Dewy around the screen, similar to Mercury Meltdown Revolution. The D-pad can be used to either heat or cool down the environment, causing changes in Dewy's state. Heating the environment will cause him to turn into a cloud of steam and allow him to strike enemies with bolts of lightning. Cooling the environment will cause Dewy to turn into ice and freeze his surroundings. The Wii remote can also be moved in a fanning motion to create gusts of wind or side to side in order to create earthquakes.

Part of the plot of the game involves rescuing Dewy's Eau friends. For the first six worlds Dewy can find 100 in each of the four missions of each world, bring them to a total of 2400 through the game, and must battle a boss in the fifth one. After completing a mission, a grade is awarded to the player regarding not only how fast it was accomplished, but also how many Eau were rescued.

=== Edit Mode ===
Dewy's Adventure features a level editing mode that allows players to create fully customizable levels featuring different landscapes, puzzles, and enemies. This feature was also included in Elebits (Eledees in Europe and Australia), the previous Wii title by Konami.

=== WiiConnect24 ===
Dewy's Adventure is one of the many titles to feature WiiConnect24 utilization. The feature allows gamers to share their custom made levels with friends (as in Elebits), and tips will be sent to the player via the Wii Message Board should they fail to defeat a boss.

== Plot ==
The game starts with a young boy standing by an old tree humming the game's theme, "Rainbow Smile". He then hears a female voice telling him that she liked the song he was humming. The boy looks around the tree and finds a young girl with a book sitting on its roots. The reader offers to tell the boy a story about Dewy, to which the boy agrees.

Dewy lives in a mythical fairytale world protected by the Tree of Seven Colors. One day the evil Don Hedron attempts to cover their world in darkness. However, Don Hedron and his Dark Water are repelled by the Tree and the fairies of the land. After a long period of peace, Don Hedron returns one day. The Tree of Seven Colors soon becomes ill and is unable to protect the land as he once did. With hope fading, it puts all of his remaining strength into Dewy, the only one who will be able to free the world of the evils presented by Don Hedron, like he did 1000 years before.

After finding the six fruits of the tree of seven colors, Dewy gains access to Don Hedron's space. While fighting minibosses in act 1 and bosses in act 2, Dewy finds a door leading to Don Hedron. The little drop encounters the villain and his pet, which resides on his arm and moves its head in diagonal ways. A fight ensues with Dewy emerging victorious. Don Hedron, however, is not done with him. He transforms into his true form, a large purple octopus with branch like "Hair". Dewy has the upper hand, until Don Hedron spits out some pink balls of goop, knocking Dewy out. Hordes of Don Hedron's minions prepare to finish him off, but the Eau arrive just in time to save Dewy. The final sequence involves the player flicking the wiimote up with the Eau every time they jump. This makes Dewy recover after some time. He leaps in the air and, using the power of the seven colors, transforms into a large gold ball and presumably sacrifices himself to transform Don Hedron into a magnificent tree. One of the Eau looks up at the tree then the credits roll. The song during the credits is "Rainbow Smile".

After the credits, the boy who was hearing the story wakes up and finds the ribbon the reader had. The final scene is a drop of water in a branch singing Rainbow Smile, hinting that Dewy survived his battle with Don Hedron.

== Characters ==
Dewy: The main character of the game. He resembles a blue drop with rounded feet and a turquoise head. He has black eyes, a small mouth and a long antenna which ends in a blob of water.

Eau: There are six types of Eau, one for each world in the game, that Dewy must rescue:

- Groovy Grassland Eau are orange and yellow with mushroom caps on their heads.
- Jolty Jungle Eau have yellow bodies, red bottoms, and green leaves on their heads.
- Icy Island Eau have pink skin (on their face and feet) and white fur.
- Clammy Cave Eau are green and see-through with spikes on their heads.
- Restless Ruins Eau resemble cacti with flowers on their heads.
- Volatile Volcano Eau have black heads, lava-red bodies, and volcano-like sombreros on their heads.

Gasdron: The first boss in the game (not counting middle bosses), Gasdron rides in a wheel less urn (which is often mistaken for a pot, much to his annoyance). He also has a skinny light purple body, three stubby tentacles with dark blue ends (resembling a mustache), solid white eyes, bumpy ovular hands without fingers, and "a weakness for glittery things". He attacks by spraying. To defeat him, Dewy must grab the large drops that fall from the ceiling when Gasdron smashes the floor after releasing his gas shock wave attack. When he is defeated, the urn blinks and smiles and then Flowers then grow from it and Gasdron panics before disappearing in a puff of smoke.

Geldron: The boss of Jolty Jungle. Geldron resembles a large crab with no claws, a pumpkin colored head with 2 yellow eyes, a purple underside with the boss symbol and 4 blue legs with turquoise knees and feet that resemble claws. He attacks using his feet to smash Dewy and by extending a large green drop of slime to grab Dewy. If this happens, the player must shake the wiimote to break free. He is defeated when Dewy first pulls him down from the ceiling and smashes his eyes. He then flips up onto his back and guards the switches used to flip him over. The platform Dewy and Geldron battle on breaks apart as the battle proceeds. Upon being defeated, Geldron screams and retracts his eyes and claws before flying all over the place. He then smashes into the ceiling and becomes as flat as a pancake. On his underside, a large bud opens up to reveal a flower.

Freezedron: The boss of Icy Island.

Catterpidron: The boss of Clammy Cave.

Mummydron: The boss of Restless Ruins. Mummydron resembles a Mummy wearing an Egyptian headpiece. Mummydron's first form is his coffin on top of 5 stone circles, which he uses to make 3 blocks that shoot 4 lasers fall onto the floor (or smash Dewy if he's not careful). He then summons a wave of sand monsters that try and eat Dewy. On the back corners of the arena are 2 staffs that absorb Cloud Dewy's lightning. Do defeat Mummydron's first form, Dewy must attack Mummydron's coffin in ice form because when Mummydron is in the air, he is protected by a pink aura. Upon destroying all of the circles under Mummydron's coffin, he destroys it and grabs the 2 staffs from the corners. He attacks by throwing them like boomerangs and swinging them at Dewy. He can also shoot his bandages at Dewy and if Dewy gets caught, the player must shake the wiimote sideways to break the bandages. To defeat him, Dewy must either use lightning on him when he's swinging his staffs or avoid the bandages he shoots so he gets stuck and then attack him as ice Dewy. Upon being defeated, Mummydron drops his staffs and slowly walks forward while most of his jewellery falls off and he gradually gets thinner. The 2 halves of his coffin then close around him and he falls to the floor.

Mothdron: The boss of Volatile volcano. His first form is a red caterpillar with a mustache. He attacks by breathing fire and spitting Chompys. To defeat him, the player must lower the temperature (Because Volatile Volcano is too hot for Ice Dewy) so his fire solidifies into rock. The player must then slide up it and hit the candle on Mothdron's head. After his first form is defeated, he rises as an adult moth with fiery wings, a blue face and a long tail with a light on the end. If Mothdron grabs Dewy using his tail, the player must shake the wiimote or he/ she will take damage. He attacks by launching fire tornadoes and waves of lava. To defeat him, the player must bash the fire rocks from the lava wave to knock him down to the floor then let him grab him/her so he/she can shake the wiimote to bring him down and then stomp him. Upon defeat, he falls to the floor and doesn't move.

Don Hedron: The main antagonist of the game. He is purple and he has two forms. His first form resembles a purple humanoid with a beard made from presumably bubbles. The character viewer states that he creates followers from his beard. He had a large crown on his head with 5 thin lines on it. On each of these lines, there is a large ball. The symbol on his belt resembles the same one that appears before each boss battle. He wears a sharp necklace around his neck. This does not do anything in battle. He is armed with a staff, which he can use to attack Dewy when his pet jumps on it. His pet resembles a purple bird with arms, legs and no wings. It has 3 strands similar to Don Hedron's. Before the boss battle, Don Hedron is seen stroking it while saying "A thousand years ago, you sealed me away. And for that, you will pay dearly.". Once Dewy beats Don hedron, he gets angry and becomes a purple polluted tree with 2 tentacles. He also has many small tentacles on his underside. These tentacles act as his feet. Once he is turned into a tree, his small tentacles have become roots and his "Hair" has become branches with loads of leaves.

== Development ==
Dewy's Adventure was developed alongside the Wii title Elebits. Both games were produced by Shingo Mukaitouge, who headed a team of 30 members for both games. Mukaitouge states that the most challenging aspect of development for Dewy's Adventure was adjusting and programming for the Wii controller, as the player controls the environment rather than the protagonist.

== Reception ==
Reception

Aggregate score
Aggregator	Score
Metacritic	67/100

Review scores
Publication	Score
Edge	6/10
Eurogamer	7/10
Famitsu	31/40
Game Informer	7/10
GamePro	3/5
GameSpot	6/10
GameSpy	3.5/5
GameTrailers	6.5/10
GameZone	7/10
IGN	6.8/10
Nintendo Power	7/10

The game received "average" reviews according to the review aggregation website Metacritic. In Japan, Famitsu gave it a score of one eight, one seven, and two eights for a total of 31 out of 40.

GameSpot praised the temperature system, boss battles and charm, but criticized the broken tilt controls and in-game advertisement. Official Nintendo Magazine had the same complaint, but praised the game's charm, difficulty, and high replay value.
