= Saga Television Station =

JOSH-DTV
- Logo used since 2015

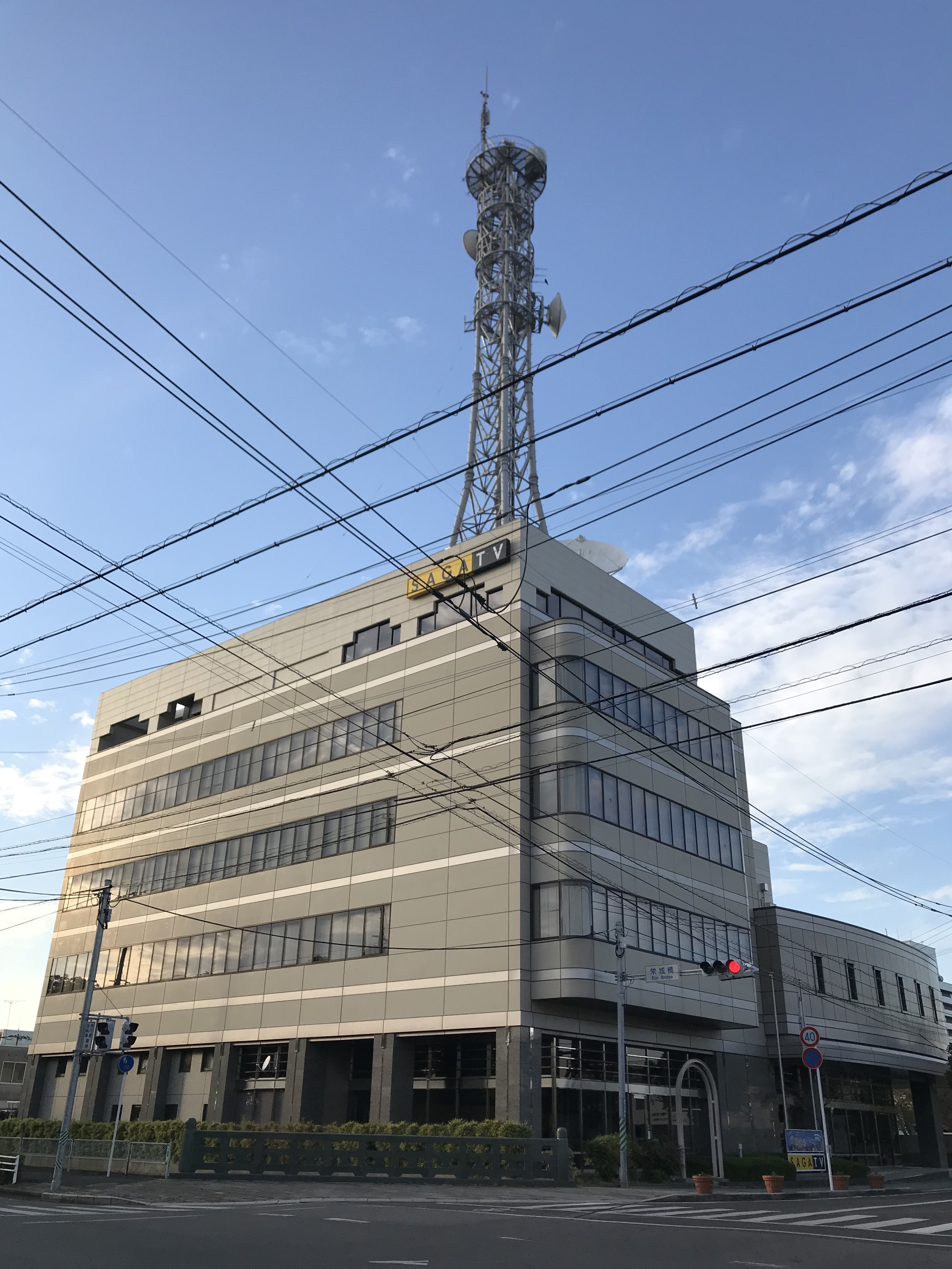
- Headquarters in Jonai, Saga
- Saga Prefecture; Japan
- City: Saga City
- Channels: Digital: 44 (UHF); Virtual: 3
- Branding: Saga TV

Programming
- Language: Japanese
- Affiliations: Fuji News Network and Fuji Network System

Ownership
- Owner: Saga Television Station Co., Ltd.

History
- First air date: 1 April 1969
- Former call signs: JOSH-TV (1969–2011)
- Former channel numbers: Analog: 36 (UHF, 1969–2011)
- Call sign meaning: Saga Hōsō (from Saga Hōsō Kabushikigaisha, the broadcaster's initial name prior to its founding)

Technical information
- Licensing authority: MIC

Links
- Website: www.sagatv.co.jp

Corporate information
- Company
- Native name: 株式会社サガテレビ
- Romanized name: Kabushikigaisha Sagaterebi
- Formerly: Saga Broadcasting Corporation (1 November 1967 – 27 May 1968)
- Founded: November 1, 1967; 58 years ago
- Headquarters: 1-6-10, Jonai, Saga City, Saga Prefecture, Japan
- Key people: Shunzo Yoshimura (President and Representative Director); Toshihiko Izumi (Chairman and Representative Director)
- Number of employees: 61 (2021)
- Footnotes; Data from its Corporate History and Profile

Saga Television Station Co., Ltd. (株式会社サガテレビ), branded since 2015 as Saga TV, is the only commercial television station broadcasting to Saga. The station is affiliated to Fuji News Network and Fuji Network System since the station launched.

Despite holding a local monopoly in commercial television to the prefecture, commercial television stations from Fukuoka are easily available.

== History ==
Prior to the opening of the bidding for a new commercial broadcaster in Saga Prefecture, people living in the area tended to listen to radio or watch TV programming with antennas pointing to either Kumamoto or Fukuoka Prefectures, due to the fact that there are no mountains surrounding the nearby mentioned prefectures. There were multiple attempts to request a broadcast license to open a commercial broadcaster in Saga Prefecture, but all were rejected. It wasn't until 1967 that the Ministry of Posts and Telecommunications included Saga in the UHF allocation. The three companies that initially applied for a license were consolidated into Saga Broadcasting Corporation, and later obtained the license on 1 November of the same year.The company name was later changed to Saga Television Station on 28 May 1968.

Before the broadcaster started its operations, TV sets in Japan were required to have the capability to receive UHF channels. In Saga Prefecture, only 30% of the population had TVs with UHF receivers, which pushed them to promote UHF TVs. The campaign was deemed successful, that 60% already had UHF capable TVs. Since Nishinippon Shimbun had played a role in the founding of Saga TV, the broadcaster then decided to be part of the Fuji News Network, which is funded by the mentioned newspaper and Television Nishinippon Corporation.

On April 1, 1969 at 8:24am, STS started broadcasting on UHF channel 36. In order to reach most of the prefecture, it set up relay stations in Imari, Karatsu and Takeo. In its first year on air, STS presented a deficit of over 50 million yen. Its first profit wasn't achieved until 1972, at 20 million yen. During the mid-70s, it introduced electronic news gathering. In May 1976, the station had finished building its own studio. Satellite news gathering was introduced in 1989.。

In the early 1990s, STS opened offices in Karatsu and Tosu to increase its news production within the prefecture. In February 1994, the station's new headquarters were completed. Broadcasts from there began on September 1. At the same time, it opened a dedicated news center. Digital terrestrial broadcasting started on December 1, 2006, while analog broadcasting shut down on July 24, 2011. In 2015, STS adopted a new logo, now reading SAGA TV.

== Programming ==
In its early years, the station faced limited human and financial resources. The evening news programs were produced by Saga Shimbun while the bulletins in other timeslots were produced by Nishinippon Shimbun. The news operation did not convert to color until 1973. In 1978, it started airing STS News Report (stsニュースレポート) on weeknights. By 1985, its ratings have surpassed those of NHK Saga. In May 1984, the station won its first FNN Monthly Award. Full-time local television news production began in 1989, ending its longtime dependency on Saga Shimbun. Since 2015, the slot is occupied by Kachikachi Press (かちかちPress).

In 1977, with the completion of its own studio, its abilities to produce programming improved and it started to produce an average of two special programs per month. In 1982, to celebrate the signing of a sister city agreement between Karatsu and Yangzhou, STS produced Hello Yangzhou. In 1983 and 1984, for its fifteenth anniversary, it produced the Rediscovering the Hometown documentary series, which explored the history of Saga Prefecture.
