= Made in Abyss =

Japanese manga series and its adaptations

- First tankōbon volume cover, featuring Reg (top) and Riko (bottom)

メイドインアビス (Meido in Abisu)
- Genre: Adventure; Dark fantasy; Science fiction
- Manga
- Written by: Akihito Tsukushi
- Published by: Takeshobo
- English publisher: NA: Seven Seas Entertainment
- Imprint: Bamboo Comics
- Magazine: Web Comic Gamma
- Original run: October 20, 2012 – present
- Volumes: 15
Further information
Anime television series
Directed by	Masayuki Kojima
Written by	Hideyuki Kurata
Music by	Kevin Penkin
Studio	Kinema Citrus
Licensed by	AUS: Madman Entertainment; NA: Sentai Filmworks; UK: MVM Films; SA / SEA: Muse Communication
Original network	AT-X, Tokyo MX, TVA, SUN, KBS, TVQ, STS, BS11
English network	US: Adult Swim (Toonami)
Original run	July 7, 2017 – September 29, 2017
Episodes	13
Anime film series
Made in Abyss: Journey's Dawn; Made in Abyss: Wandering Twilight
Directed by	Masayuki Kojima
Written by	Hideyuki Kurata
Music by	Kevin Penkin
Studio	Kinema Citrus
Licensed by	NA: Sentai Filmworks
Released	January 4, 2019 (part 1); January 18, 2019 (part 2)
Runtime	119 minutes (part 1); 108 minutes (part 2)
Anime film
Made in Abyss: Dawn of the Deep Soul
Directed by	Masayuki Kojima
Written by	Hideyuki Kurata
Music by	Kevin Penkin
Studio	Kinema Citrus
Licensed by	AUS: Madman Entertainment; NA: Sentai Filmworks; UK: MVM Films
Released	January 17, 2020
Runtime	105 minutes
Anime television series
Made in Abyss: The Golden City of the Scorching Sun
Directed by	Masayuki Kojima
Written by	Hideyuki Kurata
Music by	Kevin Penkin
Studio	Kinema Citrus
Licensed by	AUS: Sugoi Co; NA: Sentai Filmworks; UK: MVM Films; SA / SEA: Muse Communication
Original network	AT-X, Tokyo MX, BS11, SUN, KBS, TVA, STS
English network	US: Adult Swim (Toonami)
Original run	July 6, 2022 – September 28, 2022
Episodes	12
Video game
Made in Abyss: Binary Star Falling into Darkness
Developer	Chime Corporation
Publisher	Spike Chunsoft (Note: Physical versions published by Numskull Games in Europe.)
Genre	Action role-playing
Engine	Unreal Engine 4
Platform	Nintendo Switch; PlayStation 4; Windows
Released	JP: September 1, 2022; NA/EU: September 2, 2022
- icon

Made in Abyss (Japanese: メイドインアビス, Hepburn: Meido in Abisu) is a Japanese web manga series written and illustrated by Akihito Tsukushi. It has been serialized on Takeshobo's Web Comic Gamma website since October 2012, and its chapters have been collected in 15 tankōbon volumes as of August 2026. The story follows an orphaned girl named Riko, who finds and befriends a part-robot boy named Reg, and descends with him into the titular "Abyss" that leads deep into the Earth, in hopes of exploring it and finding her mother.

An anime television series adaptation produced by Kinema Citrus aired from July to September 2017. A sequel film, subtitled Dawn of the Deep Soul, premiered in Japan in January 2020. A second season, subtitled The Golden City of the Scorching Sun, aired from July to September 2022. A sequel film to the second season has been announced.

A Western live-action film adaptation began development in 2021, with Kevin McMullin hired to write and direct. An action role-playing game developed by Chime Corporation and published by Spike Chunsoft was released in September 2022.

By August 2025, the manga had over 22 million copies in circulation. In 2023, it won the 52nd Japan Cartoonists Association Award.

== Plot ==
An orphaned girl named Riko lives in the Belchero Orphanage in the town of Orth. The town surrounds a strange, giant hole descending deep into the earth, which is known as the Abyss. The Abyss harbors artifacts and remnants of civilizations long gone, and is, therefore, a popular hunting spot for so-called Cave Raiders, who undertake arduous and dangerous descents into the mist-filled pit to recover whatever relics they can find. Returning from the Abyss can be dangerous as "the Curse of the Abyss," a mysterious and potentially fatal malady, manifests upon ascension. The deeper one goes, the more acute the effects of the curse; few who have descended into the lower regions have returned to tell of their experiences. Some legendary Cave Raiders earn the title of White Whistles, one of them being Riko's mother, Lyza, who is presumed dead after taking a "last descent" into the Abyss.

Riko's longing in life is to follow in her mother's footsteps and become a White Whistle. One day, she discovers a half-human/half-robot boy in the first layer of the Abyss and names him Reg (after a dog that Riko owned). Riko and her friends sneak Reg into Belchero and quickly welcome him into their close-knit group. Sometime later, a number of findings are made from the depths of the Abyss, including Lyza's White Whistle and pages of discoveries and observations she had made, as well as a message presumably for Riko, stating she is waiting at the bottom of the Abyss. Riko, determined to find her mother, bids farewell to her friends and secretly departs into the Abyss with Reg as her companion.

== Media ==
=== Manga ===
Written and illustrated by Akihito Tsukushi, Made in Abyss started on Takeshobo's Manga Life Win+ (later Web Comic Gamma) website on October 20, 2012. Takeshobo has collected its chapters into individual tankōbon volumes. The first volume was released on July 31, 2013. As of August 26, 2026, 15 volumes have been released.

In North America, Seven Seas Entertainment announced during their panel at Anime Expo 2017 that they had licensed the manga. The translator of the anime for Sentai Filmworks, Jake Jung, also adapted the manga for Seven Seas Entertainment. Regarding his involvement in the English version of both media, he stated, "Made in Abyss is chock-full of terminology, so I hope fans of both media are able to enjoy a seamless experience." In addition, he has confirmed his intention to avoid gendered pronouns for both Nanachi and Marulk.

A manga anthology, titled Made in Abyss Official Anthology – Layer 1: Irredeemable Cave Raiders (メイドインアビス公式アンソロジー 度し難き探窟家たち, Meido in Abisu Kōshiki Ansorojī: Doshigataki Tankutsuka-tachi), was released on July 29, 2017. On December 13, 2019, Seven Seas announced they had licensed the book, and they released it on October 6, 2020. As of July 2024, a total of five anthologies have been published.

=== Anime ===
==== Television series ====
An anime television series adaptation was announced in December 2016. The 13-episode series aired from July 7 to September 29, 2017, on AT-X, Tokyo MX, TV Aichi, Sun TV, KBS Kyoto, TVQ, Saga TV, and BS11, and covers content from volumes 1 through 3. The final episode was a 1-hour long special. The series was directed by Masayuki Kojima and written by Hideyuki Kurata, with animation by Kinema Citrus and character designs by Kazuchika Kise. Australian artist Kevin Penkin composed the soundtrack for the anime. Miyu Tomita and Mariya Ise, the voice actresses for Riko and Reg, respectively, performed both the opening theme "Deep in Abyss" and the ending theme "Tabi no Hidarite, Saihate no Migite", the latter in collaboration with Shiori Izawa (Nanachi). The first season premiered on Adult Swim's Toonami programming block on January 16, 2022.

Following the release of Dawn of the Deep Soul film, a new sequel was announced. On May 5, 2021, it was announced that the sequel was a second season, officially titled Made in Abyss: The Golden City of the Scorching Sun (メイドインアビス 烈日の黄金郷, Made in Abyss: Retsujitsu no Ōgonkyō), which aired from July 6 to September 28, 2022. The main cast and staff reprised their roles. Riko Azuna performed the opening theme "Katachi", while Myth & Roid performed the ending theme "Endless Embrace".

Sentai Filmworks has licensed the series, and streamed it on Amazon's Anime Strike service in the US, and on Hidive in other territories. Sentai has since released it on home video with an English dub. Sentai Filmworks also acquired the second season for distribution worldwide except Asia, France, Germany, Italy and Middle East and North Africa, and streamed it on select digital outlets. MVM Films has acquired the series for distribution in the UK and Ireland, and Madman Entertainment has acquired the series for distribution in Australia and New Zealand.

==== Films ====
Two compilation films, titled Made in Abyss: Journey's Dawn (メイドインアビス 旅立ちの夜明け, Meido in Abisu Tabidachi no Yoake) (encompassing episodes 1–8 with new scenes for introduction) and Made in Abyss: Wandering Twilight (メイドインアビス 放浪する黄昏, Meido in Abisu Hōrō Suru Tasogare) (encompassing episodes 9–13), were released on January 4 and 18, 2019, respectively.

Following the release of the first compilation film, a sequel film to the television series was announced. Titled Made in Abyss: Dawn of the Deep Soul (劇場版メイドインアビス 深き魂の黎明, Gekijōban Made in Abyss: Fukaki Tamashii no Reimei), it premiered in Japan on January 17, 2020. Its theme song is "Forever Lost" performed by Myth & Roid.

In August 2025, it was announced that a series of films would be released starting in 2026. The first film, Made in Abyss: Awakening Mystery (メイドインアビス 目覚める神秘, Meido in Abisu Mezameru Shinpi), premiered on October 23, 2026.

In October 2026, it was announced that a second film of the series is in production.

Sentai Filmworks has licensed the two compilation films, and screened the first film at Regal Cinemas in Los Angeles on March 15, 2019, with a subtitled theatrical release on March 20, 2019, and an English dubbed theatrical release on March 25, 2019, in collaboration with Fathom Events. During its panel at Anime Expo on July 5, 2019, Sentai Filmworks announced that they had acquired the license for Dawn of the Deep Soul. Sentai Filmworks planned to screen the film in North America, the United Kingdom, and Ireland with an English dub on April 13, 2020, and with English subtitles on April 15. However, the screenings were postponed due to the COVID-19 pandemic. In November 2026, Hidive announced that it will distribute Awakening Mystery in 2027, and will screen the film in the US at Anime Frontier in Fort Worth on December 5, 2026.

=== Video games ===
An action role-playing game, titled Made in Abyss: Binary Star Falling into Darkness (メイドインアビス 闇を目指した連星, Meido in Abisu Yami o Mezashita Rensei), was developed by Chime Corporation and published by Spike Chunsoft, with Numskull Games publishing the physical versions in Europe. It is fully voiced in English and Japanese and features an original story supervised by Tsukushi. The game was released on Nintendo Switch, PlayStation 4, and Windows on September 1, 2022, in Japan, and the following day in North America and Europe.

A mobile game, titled Made in Abyss: An Unbearable and Mysterious Journey (メイドインアビス ～度し難い不思議な旅～, Meido in Abisu Doshigatai Fushigi na Tabi), was announced on May 5, 2025. The game is developed by Nobollel and published by Avex Pictures.

=== Live-action film ===
In June 2021, Deadline reported that early work was being done to develop a live-action film adaptation at Sony's Columbia Pictures, to be produced by Roy Lee and Masi Oka, and adapted by Kevin McMullin.

== Reception ==
=== Manga ===
By August 2025, the manga had over 22 million copies in circulation.

In 2018, Made in Abyss was nominated for the 11th Manga Taishō award and received a total of 40 points, coming in at eighth place. The series ranked 13th on Kono Manga ga Sugoi!'s top 20 manga for male readers in 2018. It was nominated for the French 12th ACBD's Prix Asie de la Critique 2018. Made in Abyss was awarded the Excellence Award at the 52nd Japan Cartoonists Association Awards in 2023.

=== Anime ===
Made in Abyss has been met with positive reviews and is widely considered to be one of the best anime series of the 2010s. Crunchyroll listed the series in their "Top 25 best anime of the 2010s". IGN also listed it among the best anime series of the 2010s. It was one of the Jury Recommended Works in the Animation Division at the 21st Japan Media Arts Festival in 2018. Nick Creamer of Anime News Network praised the anime for being adventure-focused, as well as its efficiency in establishing its premise. Creamer also praises it for its artwork and music that highlights the beauty and terror of the Abyss. Julian Malerman of THEM Anime Reviews praises the show for being a well-executed emotional drama saying "The manner in which the show approaches this conclusion is often brutal and alienating, but the final answer is simple and pure. It sings."

Made in Abyss was awarded Anime of the Year and Best Score at the 2nd Crunchyroll Anime Awards in 2018. The series won the 4th Anime Trending Awards in the Best in Adaptation, Best in Soundtrack and Action or Adventure Anime of the Year, and was nominated for several other categories. It also won the 25th Spanish Manga Barcelona award for the Best Anime category in 2019. In 2023, the second season of the anime series was nominated for the 7th Crunchyroll Anime Awards in several categories, but did not win. It was also awarded the Best Fantasy Anime at the 9th Anime Trending Awards.
