= Elebits =

2006 video game

- North American box art
- Developer: Konami
- Publisher: Konami
- Director: Akihiro Ishihara
- Producer: Shingo Mukaitoge
- Designers: Kazuhiro Ogawa; Masanobu Kanno; Yuta Hoshino; Akihiro Ishihara
- Composers: Naoyuki Sato; Michiru Yamane
- Engine: Open Dynamics Engine Physics Engine
- Platform: Wii
- Release: JP: December 2, 2006; NA: December 12, 2006; EU: May 4, 2007; AU: May 17, 2007; KO: April 26, 2008
- Genre: Action/First-person shooter
- Modes: Single-player, Multiplayer

Elebits (エレビッツ, Erebittsu), known in PAL territories as Eledees (LEDs), is an action/first-person shooter game developed and published by Konami for the Wii. It was released as a launch title on December 2, 2006 in Japan, then December 12, 2006 in North America, May 4, 2007 in Europe, and May 17, 2007 in Australia.

== Gameplay ==
The game is divided into small stages, each of which represents a certain area (e.g., a few rooms or a street). As the game progresses, the player gradually moves from exploring individual rooms in a house out into the street and the areas beyond. Using the on-screen cursor, the player aims at and captures Elebits, extracting their energy (measured in watts). Levels in the Story Mode are completed when the player reaches a certain power (usually within some pre-defined time limit).

The player manipulates objects in the world in order to hunt for Elebits, using the Wii controller as a "capture gun" similar to the Gravity Gun in Half-Life 2. As the majority of Elebits on a given level are hidden within or underneath objects, players must interact with the environment to reveal these hidden Elebits. Throughout the game, the Wii controller's motion-sensing abilities are gradually introduced. With selected objects, players turn, pull, and wave the Wii Remote to perform a variety of actions including opening a door (twisting the doorknob), pulling out drawers, turning on a faucet, tossing a variety of items, smashing vases against a wall, etc. Moving the Wii Remote without selecting an item rotates the player's camera-view, while the Nunchuk is used to move, crouch, and stretch.

As more Elebits are collected during a given level, the area's energy is gradually restored. This causes dark rooms to become well-lit, and more importantly, allows various electrical appliances to be utilized. Once sufficient power is available, players can activate these appliances, such as computers, microwaves and electric toy-cars, which in return release Power-Elebits. Power-Elebits, when captured, slowly increase the strength of the "capture gun", allowing the player to lift and move heavier objects.

Some levels of the game feature additional conditions for successful completion. These include a limitation on how many breakable objects can be broken (i.e., a limit on property destruction), and/or a limitation on how much noise the player can make when interacting with the environment. Since Elebits themselves can cause objects to move or fall, players must be careful to take this into account when rousing them.

The mood of the Elebits, indicated by graphics above their heads, can affect how many watts the player earned when they are captured. Elebits that are happy or calm provide more watts, Elebits that are angry or scared provide less watts and Elebits that are sad or sick provide a normal number of watts. Special power-up items can assist in taming the mood of the Elebits; one can put nearby Elebits to sleep, while another can help lure Elebits towards it. Other temporary power-ups are also available that can increase the power of the Capture Gun, muffle all sound, or enable auto-lock-on for the Capture Gun, among other effects.

Not all Elebits are captured easily. Some will move quickly or fly around, while others will attempt to attack the player, which damages the Capture Gun. In some cases, an Elebit must be thrown against an object or hit with an object as to stun it. If the Capture Gun takes too much damage, the level ends prematurely in failure.

After completing a level, the player is given a ranking based on the time it took to gain the required number of energy from Elebits, how much extra energy from Elebits they captured, the condition of the Capture Gun, and when part of the level requirements, how many times the player made too much noise, or when objects were broken. Achieving a high rank allows for players to use objects from that level within Edit mode.

The game supports up to four players in a competitive multiplayer mode.

=== Edit Mode ===
One of the modes in Elebits is "Edit Mode". In Edit Mode, players can create their own stages by placing different kinds of objects and Elebits throughout any of the 29 stages in the game. Levels are only available in edit mode if they have previously been completed in Story Mode. One can also adjust the gameplay by changing the watts needed for completion, how strong the gravity is, or what kind of items the player can use. The furniture and objects that can be used in Edit Mode are also dependent on the completion of Story Mode. The player must get at least a 'B' rank in a stage before they can use the stage-specific items.

=== Online connectivity ===
Elebits utilizes the Wii's online service, WiiConnect24. In single player and Edit Mode, players can take screenshots and send them to other Wii consoles. Players can also send levels that they created in Edit Mode.

== Plot ==
Elebits (a portmanteau of "electronics" and "bits") are small creatures that coexist with humans and are the world's source of electric energy, powering all machines and appliances. Following a thunderstorm, they cease producing energy and go into hiding, causing a blackout. Ed and Ana, who are Elebit researchers, leave home to investigate the Elebits' unusual behavior. Meanwhile, their son named Kai, who possesses dislike towards and jealousy of Elebits because his parents spent more time researching them than they do on him, decides to use his father's Capture Gun to capture the Elebits and restore the electrical power. He also feels responsible for the Elebits' unusual behaviour because the storm happened right after his wish that all the Elebits would go away.

Kai's adventures lead him through the town and towards the amusement park. He is contacted via phone by his parents, who reveal that a lightning bolt during the thunderstorm created a previously undiscovered type of Elebit, the Zero Elebit, determined to be cause of the blackout. Kai travels deeper into the amusement park and finds that the Zero Elebit is absorbing all other Elebits and dangerously increasing in size. Kai manages to subdue and tame the Zero Elebit, lifting its influence on the Elebits. Discovering that the Zero Elebit was causing all the trouble in hopes of making friends, Kai takes pity on the helpless Zero Elebit and decides to adopt it. Kai reunites with his parents and they travel back home together.

== Development ==
According to producer Shingo Mukaitoge, Elebits began development almost immediately after Nintendo first demonstrated the Wii hardware to Konami employees. Mukaitoge desired to utilize the new and unique pointing and motion sensing capabilities of the Wii Remote and designed the game around the idea of freely touching or moving objects in a room. Dennis Lee, the project manager for the game, stated that the main goal was to "create a game that was easy to pick up and play" with a hide-and-seek-inspired game design, citing Half-Life 2 as an influence on the game control. The game's controls were constantly adjusted during development in order to provide a "proper feel" to handling the in-game objects.

Though Konami originally stated at E3 2006 that Elebits would only feature a single-player mode, competitive multiplayer was implemented before the game's release.

=== Sequels and Other Appearances ===
The sequel to Elebits, Elebits: The Adventures of Kai and Zero, was released on the Nintendo DS in Japan on December 11, 2008 and in North America on January 6, 2009.

The Spin-off to Elebits, Elebits Capture, was released on iPhone and iPad in North America in 2010.

Naoyuki Sato's song "The Smile of You" (from the game's soundtrack) has been featured in some of Konami's Bemani music games, including Beatmania IIDX and pop'n music. The song is credited to his Bemani alias, Nekomata Master.

== Reception ==
Reception

Aggregate score
Aggregator	Score
Metacritic	75/100

Review scores
Publication	Score
Edge	7/10
Electronic Gaming Monthly	5.17/10
Eurogamer	6/10
Famitsu	32/40
Game Informer	7/10
GamePro	4/5
GameSpot	7.5/10
GameSpy	3/5
GameTrailers	8.3/10
GameZone	8/10
IGN	(US) 8.3/10 (AU) 7.4/10 (UK) 6.5/10
Nintendo Power	7.5/10
The A.V. Club	B
Detroit Free Press	3/4

Elebits received "generally favorable reviews" according to the review aggregation website Metacritic. Several previews compared the game to Pikmin and Katamari Damacy due to the similar art style and character design. In Japan, Famitsu gave it a score of four eights for a total of 32 out of 40.

411Mania gave it a score of eight out of 10, saying, "If only for how well it uses the Wii’s controller and for how much fun anyone can have with it, Elebits is a must have. I would easily place it among the Wii’s top five games at this point. But if you are not sure about the kiddie premise, rent it. I am sure you will have so much fun that you will want to buy it." The A.V. Club gave it a B, saying that, "All in all, even the most fun round of Elebit-catching has its trials." Detroit Free Press similarly gave it three stars out of four, saying that "The most annoying part of the game is opening doors, which takes an awkward twist, good positioning and the ability to move fast before the things close again. But generally, it's a good romp through a very simple adventure and a terrific demonstration of the Wii remote's abilities for all ages."

Elebits sold approximately 70,738 copies in Japan by the end of 2007. The game received the CESA Japan Game Award 2006: Future Award. It also received the "Best Wii Action Game of 2006", "Wii Game with Most Innovative Design of 2006", and "Wii Game with Best Use of the Wii Remote of 2006" awards from IGN.
