= List of Game Boy Advance games =

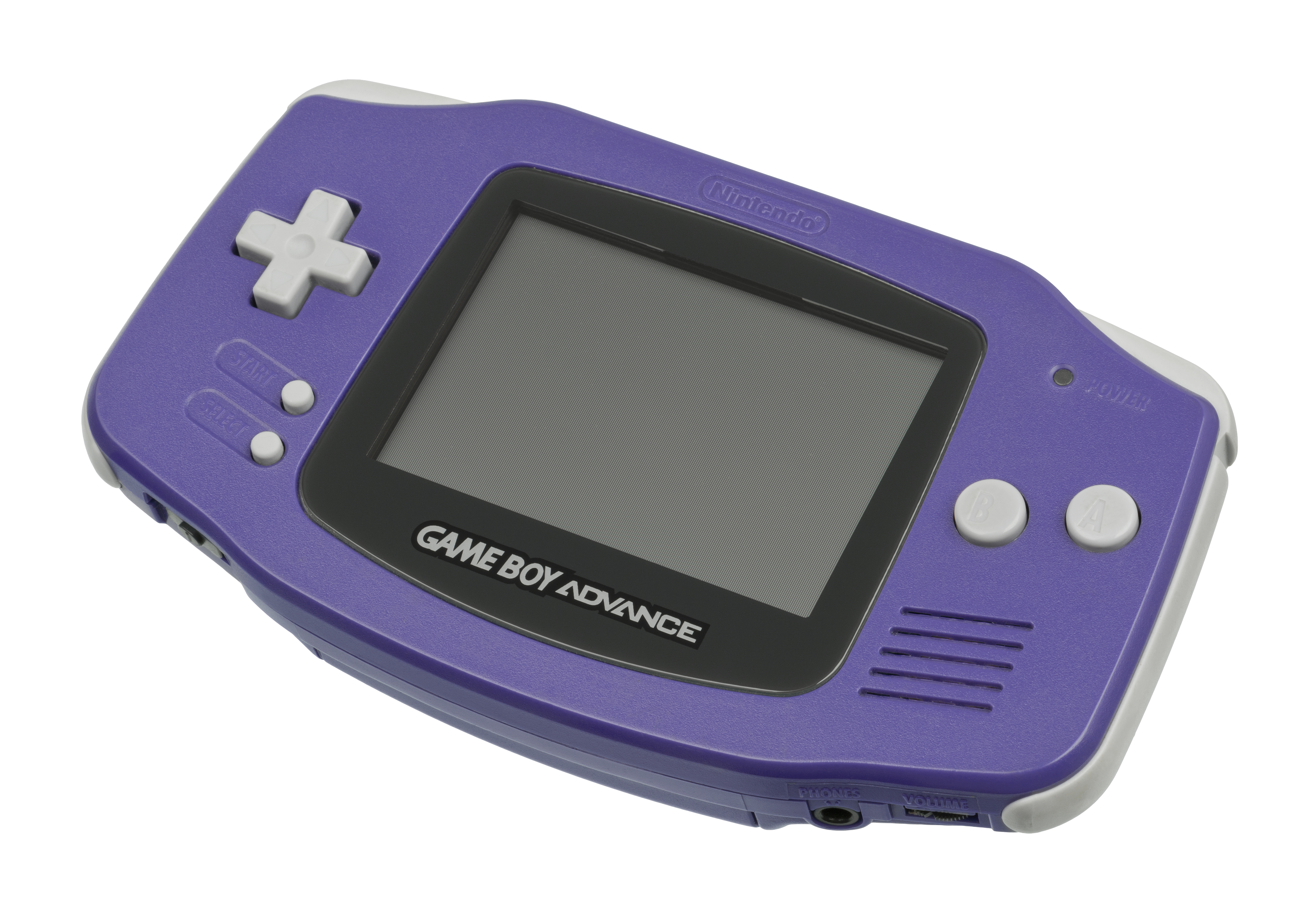
The original model of the Game Boy Advance

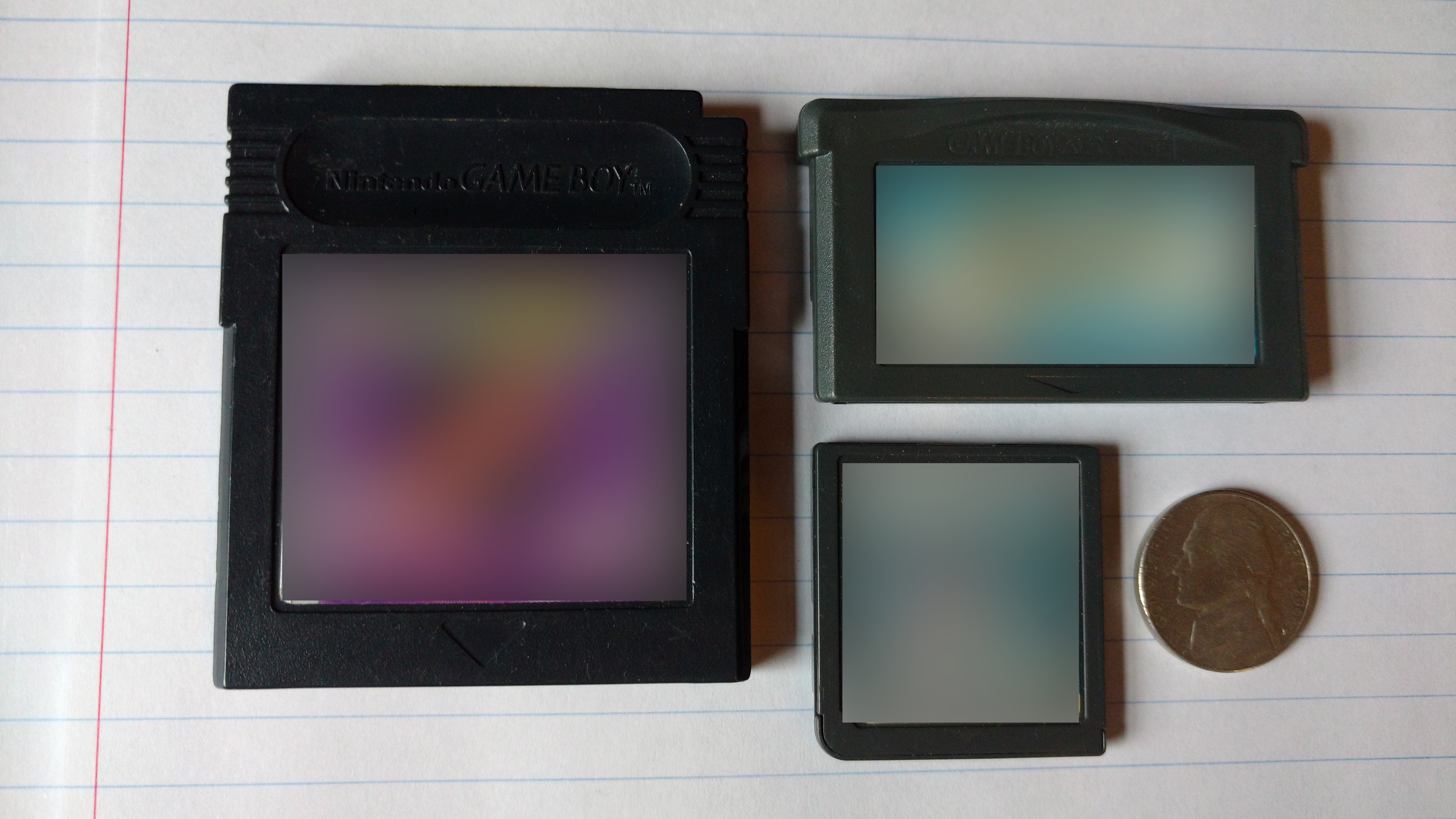
Clockwise from left: A Game Boy Game Pak, a Game Boy Advance Game Pak, and a Nintendo DS Game Card. On the far right is a United States Nickel shown for scale.

This is a list of games released on the Game Boy Advance handheld video game system. The number of licensed games in this list is 1538, organized alphabetically by the games' localized English titles, or, when Japan-exclusive, their rōmaji transliterations. This list does not include Game Boy Advance Video releases.

The Game Boy Advance is a handheld video game system developed by Nintendo and released during the sixth generation of video games.

The final licensed game released for the Game Boy Advance was the North American localization of Samurai Deeper Kyo, which released as a bundle with a DVD set on February 12, 2008.

== Games ==
Region code guide
Region	Description
Europe / PAL	Territories including much of Europe, Australia, New Zealand, and parts of Asia. (Named for PAL region, although the GBA does not use PAL, SECAM or NTSC)
Japan	Japanese formatted release.
North America	North America and other NTSC territories like Singapore and Malaysia, besides Japan.

=== List of games ===
List of Game Boy Advance games
Title(s)	Developer(s)	Publisher(s)	Release date(s)	Region(s) released				
Title(s)	Developer(s)	Publisher(s)	Release date(s)	JP	NA	EU/PAL	AU	KOR
3-in-1 Sports Pack: Paintball Splat! / Dodgeball Dodge This! / Big Alley Bowling ^{NA} • Majesco's Sport Pack ^{PAL}	Skyworks Technologies	Majesco	October 18, 2005 (NA); March 24, 2006 (PAL)	No	Yes	Yes	?	?
007: Everything or Nothing ^{NA, PAL} • James Bond? 007: Everything or Nothing ^{JP} • 007: Quitte ou Double ^{FR} • 007: Alles oder Nichts ^{DE}	Griptonite Games	Electronic Arts	November 21, 2003 (NA); December 5, 2003 (PAL); February 11, 2004 (JP)	Yes	Yes	Yes	?	?
007: Nightfire	JV Games Inc.	Electronic Arts	March 18, 2003 (NA); March 28, 2003 (EU)	No	Yes	Yes	?	?
A Sound of Thunder	Möbius Entertainment	BAM! Entertainment	2004 (PAL); 2005 (NA)	No	Yes	Yes	?	?
Ace Combat Advance	HumanSoft	Namco, Atari Europe	February 22, 2005 (NA); August 25, 2006 (EU)	No	Yes	Yes	?	?
Ace Lightning	Tiertex Design Studios	BBC Multimedia	2002 (PAL)	No	No	Yes	?	?
Action Man: Robot Atak	Magic Pockets	Atari Europe	2004 (PAL)	No	No	Yes	?	?
Activision Anthology	Aspyr	Aspyr	2003 (NA)	No	Yes	No	No	?
Advance Guardian Heroes	Treasure Co. Ltd	Ubisoft	January 14, 2004 (NA); September 22, 2004 (JP); February 17, 2005 (AU); February 18, 2005 (EU)	Yes	Yes	Yes	Yes	?
Advance Wars ^{NA, PAL} • Game Boy Wars Advance & Game Boy Wars Advance 2 ^{JP}	Intelligent Systems	Nintendo	September 10, 2001 (NA); January 11, 2002 (EU); November 25, 2004 (JP)	Yes	Yes	Yes	Yes	?
Advance Wars 2: Black Hole Rising	Intelligent Systems	Nintendo	June 24, 2003 (NA); March 10, 2003 (EU); November 25, 2004 (JP)	Yes	Yes	Yes	Yes	?
Adventure of Tokyo Disney Sea	Konami	Konami	2001 (JP)	Yes	No	No	No	?
The Adventures of Jimmy Neutron vs. Jimmy Negatron	HumanSoft	THQ	2002 (NA)	No	Yes	Yes	?	?
The Adventures of Jimmy Neutron Boy Genius: Attack of the Twonkies ^{NA, PAL} • Jimmy Neutron un Garçon Génial: L'Attaque des Twonkies ^{FR}	Tantalus	THQ	2004 (NA)	No	Yes	Yes	Yes	?
The Adventures of Jimmy Neutron Boy Genius: Jet Fusion	Helixe	THQ	2003 (NA)	No	Yes	Yes	Yes	?
Aero the Acro-Bat: Rascal Rival Revenge ^{NA, PAL} • Acrobat Kid ^{JP}	Atomic Planet	Metro3D	2002 (NA)	Yes	Yes	Yes	?	?
Agassi Tennis Generation	Aqua Pacific	DreamCatcher Interactive	2003 (NA)	No	Yes	Yes	?	?
Agent Hugo: Roborumble	Program-Ace	ITE Media	April 2, 2007 (PAL)	No	No	Yes	?	?
Aggravation	Gravity-I	DSI Games	2005 (NA)	No	Yes	No	?	?
Sorry	Gravity-I	DSI Games	2005 (NA)	No	Yes	No	?	?
Scrabble Junior	Gravity-I	DSI Games	2005 (NA)	No	Yes	No	?	?
Aggressive Inline	Full Fat	Acclaim Entertainment	2002 (NA)	No	Yes	Yes	?	?
AirForce Delta Storm ^{NA} • Airforce Delta II ^{JP} • Deadly Skies ^{PAL}	Mobile21	Konami	September 16, 2002 (NA); September 26, 2002 (JP); November 1, 2002 (EU)	Yes	Yes	Yes	?	?
Aka-chan Dōbutsuen		TDK Core	2004 (JP)	Yes	No	No	No	?
Akagi: Yami ni Maiorita Tensai	Culture Brain	Culture Brain	March 3, 2006 (JP)	Yes	No	No	No	?
Aleck Bordon Adventure: Tower and Shaft Advance	Aruze	Aruze	2004 (JP)	Yes	No	No	No	?
Alex Ferguson's Player Manager 2002 ^{UK} • Total Soccer Manager ^{PAL} • Guy Roux Manager 2002 ^{FR}	Exient Entertainment	Ubi Soft	2002 (PAL)	No	No	Yes	?	?
Alex Rider: Stormbreaker	Razorback Developments	THQ	July 7, 2006 (UK); September 25, 2006 (NA)	No	Yes	Yes	?	?
Alienators: Evolution Continues	Digital Eclipse	Activision	2001 (NA)	No	Yes	Yes	?	?
Alien Hominid	Tuna	Zoo Digital Publishing	2006 (PAL)	No	No	Yes	Yes	?
All Grown Up!: Express Yourself ^{NA} • Razbitume! — Restez Branches! ^{FR}	Altron	THQ	2004 (NA)	No	Yes	Yes	?	?
All-Star Baseball 2003	Software Creations	Acclaim Entertainment	2002 (NA)	No	Yes	No	No	?
All-Star Baseball 2004	Acclaim Studios Manchester	Acclaim Entertainment	2003 (NA)	No	Yes	No	No	?
Altered Beast: Guardian of the Realms	3d6 Games	Sega / THQ	2002 (NA)	No	Yes	Yes	?	?
The Amazing Virtual Sea-Monkeys	Elo Interactive	Conspiracy Entertainment	2002 (NA)	No	Yes	No	No	?
American Bass Challenge ^{NA} • Super Black Bass Advance ^{JP, PAL}	Starfish	Ubi Soft	2001 (NA)	Yes	Yes	Yes	No	?
American Idol ^{NA} • Pop Idol ^{PAL} • Deutschland sucht den Superstar ^{DE}	Rockstar Leeds	Codemasters	2003 (NA)	No	Yes	Yes	?	?
An American Tail: Fievel's Gold Rush ^{NA, PAL} • Fievel et le Trésor Perdu ^{FR} • Feivel der Mauswanderer und der Verborgene Schatz ^{DE}	Hokus-Pokus	Conspiracy Entertainment	2002 (NA)	No	Yes	Yes	?	?
Angel Collection - Mezase! Gakuen no Fashion Leader	Gakken	MTO	2004 (JP)	Yes	No	No	No	?
Angel Collection 2: Pichimo Ni Narou	Gakken	MTO	2004 (JP)	Yes	No	No	No	?
Angelique	Ruby Party	Koei	2002 (JP)	Yes	No	No	No	?
Animal Mania: Dokidoki Aishou Check	Jupiter	Konami	2002 (JP)	Yes	No	No	No	?
Animal Snap: Rescue Them 2 by 2	Awesome Developments	Ignition Entertainment	2003 (NA)	No	Yes	Yes	?	?
Animal Yokochou: Doki*Doki Kyushutsu Daisakusen! no Maki		Konami	2005 (JP)	Yes	No	No	No	?
Animal Yokochou: Doki Doki Shinkyuu Shiken! no Kan	Konami	Konami	2006 (JP)	Yes	No	No	No	?
Animaniacs: Lights, Camera, Action!	Warthog	Ignition Entertainment	2005 (PAL)	No	No	Yes	?	?
The Ant Bully ^{NA, PAL} • Lucas Fourmi Malgré Lui ^{FR}	Artificial Mind and Movement	Midway Games	2006 (NA)	No	Yes	Yes	?	?
Antz Extreme Racing ^{NA, PAL} • Fourmiz Extreme Racing ^{FR}	Magic Pockets	Light & Shadow Production	2002 (NA)	No	Yes	Yes	?	?
Ao Zora to Nakama Tachi: Yume no Bouken	MTO	MTO	December 13, 2002 (JP)	Yes	No	No	No	?
Archer Maclean's 3D Pool	Awesome Productions	Ignition Entertainment	November 3, 2004 (NA)	No	Yes	No	?	?
Arctic Tale	Atomic Planet	DSI Games	October 10, 2007 (NA)	No	Yes	No	?	?
Army Men Advance	DC Studios	The 3DO Company	2001 (NA)	No	Yes	Yes	?	?
Army Men: Operation Green	Pocket Studios	The 3DO Company	2001 (NA)	No	Yes	Yes	?	?
Army Men: Turf Wars	Möbius Entertainment	The 3DO Company	2002 (NA)	No	Yes	No	No	?
Around the World in 80 Days ^{NA, PAL} • Le Tour du Monde en 80 Jours ^{FR}	Saffire	Hip Games	2004 (NA)	No	Yes	Yes	?	?
Arthur and the Invisibles ^{NA} • Arthur and The Minimoys ^{PAL} • Arthur et Les Minimoys ^{FR} • Arthur e il Popolo dei Minimei ^{IT}	Mistic Software	Atari Europe	January 9, 2007 (NA)	No	Yes	Yes	Yes	?
Ashita no Joe Makkani Moeagare!	Konami	Konami	2003 (JP)	Yes	No	No	No	?
Asterix & Obelix: Bash Them All! ^{PAL} • Asterix & Obelix: Paf! Par Toutatis! ^{FR} • Asterix & Obelix: Jetzt Geht's Rund! ^{DE}	Bit Managers	Infogrames Europe	2002 (PAL)	No	No	Yes	?	?
Asterix & Obelix XXL	V3D Production	Atari Europe	2004 (PAL)	No	No	Yes	?	?
Asteroids / Pong / Yars' Revenge	ECI Interactive	DSI Games	2005 (NA)	No	Yes	Yes	?	?
Astro Boy: Omega Factor ^{NA, PAL} • Astro Boy: Tetsuwan Atom ^{JP}	Hitmaker	Sega	2003 (JP)	Yes	Yes	Yes	?	?
Atari Anniversary Advance	Digital Eclipse	Infogrames	March 26, 2002 (NA); April 5, 2002 (AU); February 14, 2003 (EU)	No	Yes	Yes	Yes	?
Atomic Betty	Big Blue Bubble	Namco; Atari Europe	October 25, 2005 (NA)	No	Yes	Yes	?	?
ATV: Quad Power Racing	Climax	Acclaim Entertainment	2002 (NA)	No	Yes	Yes	?	?
ATV: Thunder Ridge Riders	SkyRiver Studios	DSI Games	2006 (NA)	No	Yes	Yes	?	?
Avatar: The Last Airbender ^{NA} • Avatar: The Legend of Aang ^{PAL} • Avatar: Le Dernier Maître de l'Air ^{FR} • Avatar: Der Herr der Elemente ^{DE}	Halfbrick	THQ	October 10, 2006 (NA)	No	Yes	Yes	?	?
Avatar: The Last Airbender – The Burning Earth ^{NA} • Avatar: The Legend of Aang - The Burning Earth ^{PAL} • Avatar: Der Herr der Elemente - Die Erde Brennt ^{DE}	Halfbrick	THQ	October 17, 2007 (NA)	No	Yes	Yes	?	?
Azumanga Daioh Advance	TOSE	King Records	2003 (JP)	Yes	No	No	No	?
Babar: To the Rescue ^{NA, PAL} • Babar à la rescousse ^{FR}	Sirius Software	The Game Factory	2006 (NA)	No	Yes	Yes	?	?
Back to Stone	Hidden Floor	Q3 Entertainment ^{NA} / Neko Entertainment ^{PAL}	December 14, 2006 (NA/EU/PAL)	No	Yes	Yes	?	?
Back Track	JV Games	Telegames	October 4, 2001 (NA); November 23, 2001 (PAL)	No	Yes	Yes	?	?
Backyard Baseball	Game Brains	Infogrames	2003 (NA)	No	Yes	No	No	?
Backyard Baseball 2006	Game Brains	Atari	2005 (NA)	No	Yes	No	No	?
Backyard Basketball	Mistic Software	Atari	2004 (NA)	No	Yes	No	No	?
Backyard Football	Torus Games	Infogrames	2002 (NA)	No	Yes	No	No	?
Backyard Football 2006	Torus Games	Atari	2005 (NA)	No	Yes	No	No	?
Backyard Hockey	Mistic Software	Atari	2003 (NA)	No	Yes	No	No	?
Backyard Skateboarding	Full Fat	Atari	2005 (NA)	No	Yes	No	No	?
Backyard Sports: Baseball 2007	Game Brains	Atari	2006 (NA)	No	Yes	No	No	?
Backyard Sports: Basketball 2007	Mistic Software	Atari	2006 (NA)	No	Yes	No	No	?
Backyard Sports: Football 2007	Torus Games	Atari	2006 (NA)	No	Yes	No	No	?
Bakuten Shoot Beyblade: Gekitou! Saikyou Blade	A.I	Broccoli	2001 (JP)	Yes	No	No	No	?
Bakuten Shoot Beyblade 2002: Ikuze! Gekitou! Chou Jiryoku Battle!!	Hudson Soft	Broccoli	2002 (JP)	Yes	No	No	No	?
Bakuten Shoot Beyblade 2002: Gekisen! Team Battle!! Kouryuu no Shou - Daichi Version	Hudson Soft	Broccoli	2002 (JP)	Yes	No	No	No	?
Bakuten Shoot Beyblade 2002: Gekisen! Team Battle!! Seiryuu no Shou - Takao Version	Hudson Soft	Broccoli	2002 (JP)	Yes	No	No	No	?
Baldur's Gate: Dark Alliance	Magic Pockets	Destination Software	2004 (NA)	No	Yes	Yes	?	?
Ballistic: Ecks vs. Sever ^{NA} • Ecks vs. Sever II: Ballistic ^{PAL}	Crawfish Int.	BAM! Entertainment	2002 (NA)	No	Yes	Yes	?	?
Banjo-Kazooie: Grunty's Revenge ^{NA, PAL} • Banjo-Kazooie: La Revanche de Grunty ^{FR} • Banjo-Kazooie: Grunty's Rache ^{DE} • Banjo-Kazooie: La Venganza de Grunty ^{ES} • La vendetta di Grunty ^{IT}	Rare	THQ	September 15, 2003 (NA); October 24, 2003 (EU)	No	Yes	Yes	?	?
Banjo-Pilot	Rare	THQ	January 12, 2005 (NA); February 1, 2005 (EU)	No	Yes	Yes	?	?
Barbie and the Magic of Pegasus	WayForward	Vivendi Universal Games	2005 (NA)	No	Yes	Yes	?	?
Barbie as the Island Princess	HumanSoft	Activision	2007 (NA)	No	Yes	No	No	?
Barbie as the Princess and the Pauper	WayForward	Vivendi Universal Games	2004 (NA)	No	Yes	Yes	?	?
The Barbie Diaries: High School Mystery	Gorilla Systems	Activision	2006 (NA)	No	Yes	Yes	?	?
Barbie in the 12 Dancing Princesses ^{NA, PAL} • Barbie au Bal des 12 Dancing Princesses ^{FR} • Barbie in die 12 Tanzenden Prinzessinnen ^{DE}	WayForward	Activision	2007 (NA)	No	Yes	Yes	?	?
Barbie Software - Horse Adventures: Blue Ribbon Race ^{NA} • Barbie Horse Adventures: The Big Race ^{PAL} • Barbie Pferdeabenteuer: Das große Reitturnier ^{DE}	Möbius Entertainment	Vivendi Universal Games	2003 (NA)	No	Yes	Yes	?	?
Barbie Software: Groovy Games	Digital Illusions	Vivendi Universal Games	2002 (NA)	No	Yes	Yes	?	?
Barnyard ^{NA} • Nickelodeon Barnyard ^{PAL} • La Ferme en Folie ^{FR} • El Corral ^{ES} • Barnyard Il Cortile ^{IT}	Halfbrick Studios	THQ	2006 (NA)	No	Yes	Yes	Yes	?
Baseball Advance ^{NA} • Greatest Nine ^{JP}	Smilebit	THQ ^{NA} Sega ^{PAL}	March 19, 2002 (NA); August 8, 2002 (JP)	Yes	Yes	No	No	?
Bass Tsuri Shiyouze!: Tournament wa Senryaku da!	Konami	Konami	2002 (JP)	Yes	No	No	No	?
Batman Begins	Vicarious Visions	EA Games	2005 (NA)	No	Yes	Yes	?	?
Batman: Rise of Sin Tzu	Ubi Soft Montreal	Ubi Soft	2003 (NA)	No	Yes	No	No	?
Batman: Vengeance	Ubi Soft Montreal	Ubi Soft	2001 (NA)	No	Yes	Yes	?	?
Battle B-Daman ^{NA} • B-Densetsu! Battle B-Daman Moero! B-Kon ^{JP}	Atlus	Atlus	2004 (JP); 2006 (NA)	Yes	Yes	No	No	?
Battle B-Daman: Fire Spirits! ^{NA} • B-Densetsu! Battle B-Daman Honoo Tamashii ^{JP}	Atlus	Atlus	2005 (JP); 2006 (NA)	Yes	Yes	No	No	?
Battle x Battle: Kyoudai Uo Densetsu	Starfish	Starfish	2003 (JP)	Yes	No	No	No	?
BattleBots: Beyond the BattleBox	Cave Barn	Majesco ^{NA} Vivendi Universal Games ^{PAL}	December 10, 2002 (NA); June 20, 2003 (EU)	No	Yes	Yes	?	?
BattleBots: Design & Destroy	Cave Barn	Majesco	August 31, 2003 (NA)	No	Yes	No	No	?
BB Ball	Micott & Basara	Micott & Basara	2004 (JP)	Yes	No	No	No	?
Beast Shooter: Mezase Beast King	Hudson Soft	Konami	2002 (JP)	Yes	No	No	No	?
The Bee Game ^{NA, PAL} • Die Biene Maja: Klatschmohnwiese in Gefahr ^{DE}	Independent Arts	Midway	October 16, 2007 (NA)	No	Yes	Yes	?	?
The Berenstain Bears and the Spooky Old Tree	Program-Ace	Namco	2005 (NA)	No	Yes	No	No	?
Best Play Pro Yakyuu (Best Play Pro Baseball)	ParityBit	Enterbrain	2002 (JP)	Yes	No	No	No	?
Beyblade: G-Revolution	Full Fat	Atari	2004 (NA)	No	Yes	Yes	?	?
Beyblade VForce: Ultimate Blader Jam	Full Fat	Atari	2003 (NA)	No	Yes	Yes	?	?
Bibi Blocksberg: Der Magische Hexenkreis ^{DE}	Morgen Studios	Kiddinx	2005 (PAL)	No	No	Yes	No	No
Bibi und Tina: Ferien auf dem Martinshof ^{DE}	Morgen Studios	Kiddinx	2006 (PAL)	No	No	Yes	No	No
The Bible Game	Alpine Studios	Crave Entertainment	2005 (NA)	No	Yes	No	No	No
Big Mutha Truckers	Raylight Studios	Destination Software ^{NA} Zoo Digital Publishing ^{PAL}	2005 (NA)	No	Yes	Yes	?	?
Bionicle	Möbius Entertainment	THQ	September 9, 2003 (NA); September 26, 2003 (EU)	No	Yes	Yes	?	?
Bionicle Heroes	Amaze Entertainment	Eidos Interactive	November 14, 2006 (NA); November 24, 2006 (EU)	No	Yes	Yes	?	?
Bionicle: Matoran Adventures	Argonaut Games	Electronic Arts; Lego Interactive	October 28, 2002 (NA); November 1, 2002 (EU)	No	Yes	Yes	?	?
Bionicle: Maze of Shadows	Razorback Developments	THQ	March 24, 2005 (NA)	No	Yes	Yes	?	?
bit Generations: Boundish	Skip	Nintendo	2006 (JP)	Yes	No	No	No	?
bit Generations: Coloris	Skip	Nintendo	2006 (JP)	Yes	No	No	No	?
bit Generations: Dialhex	Skip	Nintendo	July 13, 2006 (JP)	Yes	No	No	No	?
bit Generations: Digidrive	Q-Games	Nintendo	July 13, 2006 (JP)	Yes	No	No	No	?
bit Generations: Dotstream	Skip	Nintendo	July 13, 2006 (JP)	Yes	No	No	No	?
bit Generations: Orbital	Skip	Nintendo	July 13, 2006 (JP)	Yes	No	No	No	?
bit Generations: Soundvoyager	Skip	Nintendo	July 13, 2006 (JP)	Yes	No	No	No	?
Black Belt Challenge	Lost Boys	Xicat Interactive	October 18, 2002 (EU)	No	No	Yes	?	?
Black Black	Capcom	Capcom	2002 (JP)	Yes	No	No	No	?
Black Matrix Zero	Flight-Plan	NEC Interchannel	2002 (JP)	Yes	No	No	No	?
Blackthorne	Mass Media Inc.	Blizzard Entertainment	2003 (NA)	No	Yes	Yes	?	?
Blades of Thunder	InterActive Vision Games	Summitsoft Entertainment	February 23, 2005 (NA)	No	Yes	No	No	?
Bleach Advance: Kurenai ni Somaru Soul Society	Alpha Unit	Sega	2005 (JP)	Yes	No	No	No	?
Blender Bros.	A.I	Infogrames	April 16, 2002 (NA)	No	Yes	No	No	?
BMX Trick Racer	Hypnotix	Simon & Schuster Interactive	April 17, 2003 (NA)	No	Yes	No	No	?
Board Game Classics ^{NA} • Board Game Classics: Chess & Draughts & Backgammon ^{PAL}	Black Lantern Studios	DSI Games ^{NA} Zoo Digital Publishing ^{PAL}	November 3, 2005 (NA/EU/PAL)	No	Yes	Yes	?	?
Bobobo-bo Bo-bobo: 9 Kiwame Senshi Gyagu Yuugou		Hudson Soft	2004 (JP)	Yes	No	No	No	?
Bobobo-bo Bo-bobo: Backutou Hajike Taisen		Hudson Soft	2004 (JP)	Yes	No	No	No	?
Bobobo-bo Bo-bobo: Majide!!? Shinken Shoubu	Rokumendo	Hudson Soft	2003 (JP)	Yes	No	No	No	?
Bobobo-bo Bo-bobo: Ougi 87.5 Bakuretsu Hanage Shinken		Hudson Soft	2002 (JP)	Yes	No	No	No	?
Boktai: The Sun is in Your Hand ^{NA, PAL} • Bokura no Taiyō ^{JP}	Hideo Kojima Production	Konami	July 17, 2003 (JP); September 13, 2003 (NA); May 14, 2004 (PAL)	Yes	Yes	Yes	Yes	?
Boktai 2: Solar Boy Django ^{NA, PAL} • Zoku Bokura no Taiyō Taiyō Shōnen Jango ^{JP}	Hideo Kojima Production	Konami	July 22, 2004 (JP); October 19, 2004 (NA); June 10, 2005 (PAL)	Yes	Yes	Yes	?	?
Boku no Kabuto Kuwagata		MTO	2003 (JP)	Yes	No	No	No	?
Boku no Kabuto Mushi		MTO	2001 (JP)	Yes	No	No	No	?
Boku no Kuwagata		MTO	2001 (JP)	Yes	No	No	No	?
Boku wa Koukuu Kanseikan (I am an Air Traffic Controller)	Graphic Research	Tamsoft	2001 (JP)	Yes	No	No	No	?
Bomberman Jetters: Densetsu no Bomberman	A.I	Hudson Soft	October 24, 2002 (JP)	Yes	No	No	No	?
Bomberman Jetters: Game Collection	Hudson Soft	Hudson Soft	October 16, 2003 (JP)	Yes	No	No	No	?
Bomberman Max 2: Blue Advance ^{NA, PAL} • Bomberman Max 2: Bomberman Version ^{JP}	Hudson Soft	Hudson Soft ^{JP} Majesco ^{NA} Vivendi Universal Games ^{PAL}	February 7, 2002 (JP); May 30, 2002 (NA); March 14, 2003 (PAL)	Yes	Yes	Yes	?	?
Bomberman Max 2: Red Advance ^{NA, PAL} • Bomberman Max 2: Max Version ^{JP}	Hudson Soft	Hudson Soft ^{JP} Majesco ^{NA} Vivendi Universal Games ^{PAL}	February 7, 2002 (JP); May 30, 2002 (NA); March 14, 2003 (PAL)	Yes	Yes	Yes	?	?
Bomberman Tournament ^{NA, PAL} • Bomberman Story ^{JP}	Hudson Soft	Hudson Soft ^{JP} Activision ^{NA, PAL}	April 27, 2001 (JP); June 29, 2001 (NA); August 10, 2001 (EU)	Yes	Yes	Yes	?	?
Bookworm	PopCap	Majesco	February 25, 2003 (NA)	No	Yes	No	No	?
Bouken Yuuki Pluster World: Densetsu no Plust Gate	Will	Takara	2003 (JP)	Yes	No	No	No	?
Bouken Yuuki Pluster World: Densetsu no Plust Gate EX	Will	Takara	2003 (JP)	Yes	No	No	No	?
Bouken Yuuki Pluster World: Pluston GP	Will	Takara	2003 (JP)	Yes	No	No	No	?
Bouken-Ou Beet: Busters Road		Bandai	2005 (JP)	Yes	No	No	No	?
Boukyaku no Senritsu: The Melody of Oblivion	Alpha Unit	Bandai	2004 (JP)	Yes	No	No	No	?
Boulder Dash EX	Vision Works	Kemco	September 17, 2002 (JP/NA); April 10, 2003 (EU)	Yes	Yes	Yes	?	?
Boxing Fever	Digital Fiction	Majesco	2001 (NA); 2002 (PAL)	No	Yes	Yes	?	?
Bratz	DC Studios	Ubi Soft	2003 (NA)	No	Yes	Yes	?	?
Bratz Babyz	Barking Lizards	THQ	2006 (NA)	No	Yes	Yes	?	?
Bratz: Forever Diamondz	Barking Lizards	THQ	2006 (NA)	No	Yes	Yes	?	?
Bratz: Rock Angelz	Altron	THQ	2005 (NA)	No	Yes	Yes	?	?
Bratz: The Movie	Barking Lizards	THQ	November 1, 2007 (NA); August 17, 2007 (EU)	No	Yes	Yes	No	?
Breath of Fire ^{NA, PAL} • Breath of Fire: Ryuu no Senshi ^{JP}	Capcom	Capcom^{JP, NA} Ubi Soft ^{PAL}	July 6, 2001 (JP); December 1, 2001 (NA); December 14, 2001 (EU)	Yes	Yes	Yes	?	?
Breath of Fire II ^{NA, PAL} • Breath of Fire II: Shimei no Ko ^{JP}	Capcom	Capcom^{JP, NA} Ubi Soft ^{PAL}	December 21, 2001 (JP); April 15, 2002 (NA); June 28, 2002 (EU)	Yes	Yes	Yes	?	?
Britney's Dance Beat	Art	THQ	March 26, 2002 (NA); June 14, 2002 (EU)	No	Yes	Yes	?	?
Broken Sword: The Shadow of the Templars ^{NA, PAL} • Broken Sword: Les Chevaliers de Baphomet ^{FR}	Revolution Software	BAM! Entertainment	2002 (NA)	No	Yes	Yes	?	?
Bruce Lee: Return of the Legend	Vicarious Visions	Universal Interactive	2003 (NA)	No	Yes	Yes	?	?
Bubble Bobble Old & New	Taito Corporation	Media Kite ^{JP} Empire Interactive ^{NA, PAL}	2002 (JP); 2003 (NA/PAL)	Yes	Yes	Yes	?	?
Buffy the Vampire Slayer: Wrath of the Darkhul King ^{NA, PAL} • Buffy Contre les Vampires: La Colère de Darkhul ^{FR} • Buffy im Bann der Daemonen: Koenig Darkhuls Zorn ^{DE}	Natsume Co., Ltd.	THQ	2003 (NA)	No	Yes	Yes	?	?
Butt-Ugly Martians: B.K.M. Battles	Runecraft	Vivendi Universal Games	2002 (NA)	No	Yes	Yes	?	?
Cabbage Patch Kids: The Patch Puppy Rescue	1st Playable Productions	D3Publisher	2006 (NA)	No	Yes	Yes	?	?
Cabela's Big Game Hunter	ImageBuilder Software	Activision	2002 (NA)	No	Yes	No	No	?
Cabela's Big Game Hunter 2005 Adventures	Torus Games	Activision Value	2004 (NA)	No	Yes	Yes	?	?
Caesars Palace Advance: Millennium Gold Edition		Majesco	September 19, 2001 (NA); February 22, 2002 (EU)	No	Yes	Yes	No	?
Calcio Bit	ParityBit	Nintendo	2006 (JP)	Yes	No	No	No	?
Camp Lazlo: Leaky Lake Games	Collision Studios	Crave Entertainment	2006 (NA)	No	Yes	Yes	?	?
Candy Land / Chutes and Ladders / Original Memory Game	Black Lantern Studios	Destination Software	2005 (NA); 2006 (PAL)	No	Yes	Yes	?	?
Capcom Classics Mini-Mix	Digital Eclipse	Capcom	2006 (NA)	No	Yes	No	No	?
Captain Tsubasa: Eikou no Kiseki (Captain Tsubasa: Road to Glory)		Konami	2002 (JP)	Yes	No	No	No	?
Car Battler Joe ^{NA} • Gekitou! Car Battler Go!! ^{JP}	Ancient	Victor Interactive Software ^{JP} Natsume Inc. ^{NA}	2001 (JP); 2002 (NA)	Yes	Yes	No	No	?
Cardcaptor Sakura: Sakura Card de Mini-Game	Affect	TDK Core	2003 (JP)	Yes	No	No	No	?
Cardcaptor Sakura: Sakura Card-hen - Sakura Card to Tomodachi		MTO	2004 (JP)	Yes	No	No	No	?
Card Party	NDcube	Media Kite	2002 (JP)	Yes	No	No	No	?
Care Bears: Care Quest ^{NA, PAL} • Les Bisounours: Mission Câlins ^{FR}	Sirius Games	The Game Factory	2005 (NA)	No	Yes	Yes	?	?
Carrera Power Slide	Tiertex Design Studios	Stadlbauer	2003 (PAL)	No	No	Yes	?	?
Cars ^{NA, PAL} • Cars: Motori Ruggenti ^{IT}	Helixe	THQ	June 6, 2006 (NA)	Yes	Yes	Yes	Yes	?
Cars Mater-National Championship ^{NA, PAL} • Cars: La Coupe Internationale de Martin ^{FR}	Tantalus	THQ	November 12, 2007 (NA)	No	Yes	Yes	Yes	?
Cartoon Network: Block Party	Majesco	Majesco	2004 (NA)	No	Yes	No	?	?
Cartoon Network Speedway	DC Studios	Majesco	2003 (NA)	No	Yes	No	No	?
Casper	Planet Interactive	Microïds	2002 (NA)	No	Yes	Yes	?	?
Castlevania: Aria of Sorrow ^{NA, PAL} • Castlevania: Akatsuki no Minuet ^{JP}	KCEK	Konami	May 6, 2003 (NA); May 8, 2003 (JP); May 9, 2003 (EU)	Yes	Yes	Yes	?	?
Castlevania: Circle of the Moon ^{NA} • Castlevania ^{PAL} • Akumajou Dracula: Circle of the Moon ^{JP}	KCEK	Konami	March 21, 2001 (JP); June 11, 2001 (NA); June 22, 2001 (PAL)	Yes	Yes	Yes	?	?
Castlevania: Harmony of Dissonance ^{NA, PAL} • Castlevania: Byakuya no Conserto ^{JP}	KCEK	Konami	June 6, 2002 (JP); September 16, 2002 (NA); October 11, 2002 (EU)	Yes	Yes	Yes	?	?
Catwoman	Magic Pockets	EA Games	July 23, 2004 (NA); July 30, 2004 (AU); August 6, 2004 (EU)	No	Yes	Yes	?	?
Catz ^{NA, PAL} • Nakayoshi Pet Advance Series 3: Kawaii Koneko ^{JP}	MTO / Powerhead Games ^{NA, PAL}	Ubisoft ^{NA, PAL}, MTO ^{JP}	2006 (NA/PAL); 2002 (JP)	Yes	Yes	Yes	?	?
Centipede / Breakout / Warlords	Epicenter Interactive	DSI Games	2005 (NA)	No	Yes	Yes	?	?
Cesti to Meigurumi-tachi no Mahou no Bouken: Kisekko Gurumii		MTO	2003 (JP)	Yes	No	No	No	?
Charlie and the Chocolate Factory ^{NA, PAL} • Charlie et la Chocolaterie ^{FR}	High Voltage Software	Global Star Software	July 15, 2005 (NA)	No	Yes	Yes	?	?
Charlotte's Web ^{NA, PAL} • Le Petit Monde de Charlotte ^{FR} • Schweinchen Wilbur und seine Freunde ^{DE} • La Telaraña de Carlota ^{ES} • Le Tela di Carlotta ^{IT}	Backbone Entertainment	Sega	2006 (NA)	No	Yes	Yes	Yes	?
The Cheetah Girls	Gorilla Systems	Buena Vista Games	2006 (NA)	No	Yes	No	No	?
Chessmaster	Ubisoft	Ubisoft	March 22, 2002 (EU); August 28, 2002 (NA)	No	Yes	Yes	?	?
Chicken Shoot	FrontLine Studios	Destination Software	2005 (NA)	No	Yes	Yes	?	?
Chicken Shoot 2	FrontLine Studios	Destination Software	2006 (NA)	No	Yes	Yes	?	?
Chobits: Atashi Dake no Hito		Marvelous Entertainment	2002 (JP)	Yes	No	No	No	?
Chocobo Land: A Game of Dice	Square	Square	December 13, 2002 (JP)	Yes	No	No	No	?
The Chronicles of Narnia: The Lion, the Witch and the Wardrobe ^{NA, PAL} • Le Monde de Narnia Chapitre 1: Le Lion, la Sorcière Blanche et l'Armoire Magique ^{FR} • Die Chroniken von Narnia: Der König von Narnia ^{DE} • Las Crónicas de Narnia: El León, la Bruja y El Ropero ^{ES} • Le Cronache Di Narnia: Il Leone, La Strega e L'armadio ^{IT} • De Kronieken van Narnia: De leeuw, de heks en de kleerkast ^{NL}	Amaze Entertainment	Buena Vista Games	2005 (NA)	No	Yes	Yes	?	?
ChuChu Rocket!	Sonic Team	Sega	March 21, 2001 (JP); June 11, 2001 (NA); December 7, 2001 (PAL)	Yes	Yes	Yes	?	?
CIMA: The Enemy ^{NA} • Frontier Stories ^{JP}	Neverland	Natsume Inc. ^{NA} Marvelous Entertainment ^{JP}	November 18, 2003 (NA); October 27, 2005 (JP)	Yes	Yes	No	No	?
Cinnamon: Yume no Daibouken		Imagineer	2004 (JP)	Yes	No	No	No	?
Cinnamoroll FuwaFuwa Daibouken		Rocket Company	2005 (JP)	Yes	No	No	No	?
Cinnamoroll Koko ni Ruyo	A.I	Imagineer	2003 (JP)	Yes	No	No	No	?
Classic NES Series: Bomberman ^{NA} • Famicom Mini: Bomberman ^{JP} • NES Classics: Bomberman ^{PAL}	Hudson Soft	Nintendo	February 14, 2004 (JP); June 7, 2004 (NA); July 9, 2004 (PAL)	Yes	Yes	Yes	?	?
Classic NES Series: Castlevania ^{NA} • Famicom Mini: Akumajou Dracula ^{JP} • NES Classics: Castlevania ^{PAL}	Konami	Nintendo	August 10, 2004 (JP); October 25, 2004 (NA); January 7, 2005 (PAL)	Yes	Yes	Yes	Yes	?
Classic NES Series: Donkey Kong ^{NA} • Famicom Mini: Donkey Kong ^{JP} • NES Classics: Donkey Kong ^{PAL}	Nintendo	Nintendo	February 14, 2004 (JP); June 7, 2004 (NA); July 9, 2004 (PAL)	Yes	Yes	Yes	?	?
Classic NES Series: Dr. Mario ^{NA} • Famicom Mini: Dr. Mario ^{JP} • NES Classics: Dr. Mario ^{PAL}	Nintendo	Nintendo	May 21, 2004 (JP); October 25, 2004 (NA); January 7, 2005 (PAL)	Yes	Yes	Yes	?	?
Classic NES Series: Excitebike ^{NA} • Famicom Mini: Excitebike ^{JP} • NES Classics: Excitebike ^{PAL}	Nintendo	Nintendo	February 14, 2004 (JP); June 7, 2004 (NA); July 9, 2004 (PAL)	Yes	Yes	Yes	?	?
Classic NES Series: Ice Climber ^{NA} • Famicom Mini: Ice Climber ^{JP} • NES Classics: Ice Climber ^{PAL}	Nintendo	Nintendo	February 14, 2004 (JP); June 7, 2004 (NA); July 9, 2004 (PAL)	Yes	Yes	Yes	?	?
Classic NES Series: The Legend of Zelda ^{NA} • Famicom Mini: Zelda no Densetsu ^{JP} • NES Classics: The Legend of Zelda ^{PAL}	Nintendo	Nintendo	February 14, 2004 (JP); June 7, 2004 (NA); July 9, 2004 (PAL)	Yes	Yes	Yes	?	?
Classic NES Series: Metroid ^{NA} • Famicom Mini: Metroid ^{JP} • NES Classics: Metroid ^{PAL}	Nintendo	Nintendo	August 10, 2004 (JP); October 25, 2004 (NA); January 7, 2005 (PAL)	Yes	Yes	Yes	?	?
Classic NES Series: Pac-Man ^{NA} • Famicom Mini: Pac-Man ^{JP} • NES Classics: Pac-Man ^{PAL}	Namco	Nintendo	February 14, 2004 (JP); June 7, 2004 (NA); July 9, 2004 (PAL)	Yes	Yes	Yes	?	?
Classic NES Series: Super Mario Bros. ^{NA} • Famicom Mini: Super Mario Bros. ^{JP} • NES Classics: Super Mario Bros. ^{PAL}	Nintendo	Nintendo	February 14, 2004 (JP); June 7, 2004 (NA); July 9, 2004 (PAL)	Yes	Yes	Yes	?	?
Classic NES Series: Xevious ^{NA} • Famicom Mini: Xevious ^{JP} • NES Classics: Xevious ^{PAL}	Namco	Nintendo	February 14, 2004 (JP); June 7, 2004 (NA); July 9, 2004 (PAL)	Yes	Yes	Yes	?	?
Classic NES Series: Zelda II: The Adventure of Link ^{NA} • Famicom Mini: The Legend of Zelda 2: Link no Bouken ^{JP} • NES Classics: Zelda II: The Adventure of Link ^{PAL}	Nintendo	Nintendo	August 10, 2004 (JP); October 25, 2004 (NA); January 7, 2005 (PAL)	Yes	Yes	Yes	?	?
Cocoto Kart Racer	Neko Entertainment	Bigben Interactive	2005 (PAL)	No	No	Yes	?	?
Cocoto Platform Jumper	Neko Entertainment	Bigben Interactive	July 10, 2007 (PAL)	No	No	Yes	?	?
Codename: Kids Next Door – Operation: S.O.D.A.	Vicarious Visions	Global Star Software	2004 (NA)	No	Yes	No	No	No
Colin McRae Rally 2.0	Spellbound	Ubi Soft	2002 (NA)	No	Yes	Yes	?	?
Columns Crown	Wow Entertainment	Sega, THQ	December 7, 2001 (PAL); December 13, 2001 (JP); February 4, 2002 (NA)	Yes	Yes	Yes	?	?
Combat Choro Q: Advance Daisakusen	Access	Takara	2002 (JP)	Yes	No	No	No	?
Comix Zone	Virtucraft	Sega	2002 (PAL)	No	No	Yes	?	?
Connect Four / Perfection / Trouble	Gravity-I	Destination Software	2005 (NA)	No	Yes	No	No	?
Contra Advance: The Alien Wars EX ^{NA, PAL} • Contra: Hard Spirits ^{JP}	TOSE	Konami	2002 (NA)	Yes	Yes	Yes	?	?
Corvette	Visual Impact	TDK Mediactive	November 11, 2003 (NA)	No	Yes	No	No	?
Crash Bandicoot: The Huge Adventure ^{NA} • Crash Bandicoot Advance ^{JP} • Crash Bandicoot XS ^{PAL}	Vicarious Visions	Universal Interactive: JP: Konami	February 25, 2002 (NA); March 15, 2002 (EU); July 18, 2002 (JP)	Yes	Yes	Yes	?	?
Crash Bandicoot 2: N-Tranced ^{NA, PAL} • Crash Bandicoot Advance 2: Guru Guru Sai Min Dai Panic! ^{JP}	Vicarious Visions	Universal Interactive: JP: Konami	January 7, 2003 (NA); March 14, 2003 (EU); December 4, 2003 (JP)	Yes	Yes	Yes	?	?
Crash Bandicoot Purple: Ripto's Rampage ^{NA} • Crash Bandicoot Advance: Wakuwaku Tomodachi Daisakusen! ^{JP} • Crash Bandicoot: Fusion ^{PAL}	Vicarious Visions	Vivendi Universal Games	June 3, 2004 (NA); June 25, 2004 (EU); December 9, 2004 (JP)	Yes	Yes	Yes	Yes	?
Crash Nitro Kart ^{NA, PAL} • Crash Bandicoot: Bakusou! Nitro Kart ^{JP}	Vicarious Visions	Universal Interactive: JP: Konami	November 11, 2003 (NA); November 28, 2003 (EU); August 26, 2004 (JP)	Yes	Yes	Yes	Yes	?
Crash of the Titans	Amaze Entertainment	Vivendi Games	October 2, 2007 (NA)	No	Yes	Yes	?	?
Crayon Shin-Chan: Arashi no Yobu Cinema-Land no Daibouken! ^{JP} • Shinchan: Aventuras en Cineland ^{ES}	Inti Creates	Banpresto, Atari Europe	2004 (JP); 2005 (PAL)	Yes	No	Yes	?	?
Crayon Shin-Chan: Densetsu o Yobu Omake no To Shukkugaan! ^{JP} • Shinchan contra los muñecos de Shock Gahn ^{ES}	Inti Creates	Banpresto, Atari Europe	2006 (NA)	Yes	No	Yes	?	?
Crazy Frog Racer	Neko Entertainment	Digital Jesters	2005 (PAL)	No	No	Yes	?	?
Crazy Chase	Kemco	Kemco	2002 (NA)	No	Yes	Yes	?	?
Crazy Taxi: Catch a Ride	Graphic State	Sega, THQ	2003 (NA)	No	Yes	Yes	Yes	?
Creatures	Elo Interactive	Swing! Deutschland	2002 (PAL)	No	No	Yes	?	?
Croket! Great Jikuu no Boukensha	Jupiter	Konami	2004 (JP)	Yes	No	No	No	?
Croket! Yume no Banker Survival!		Konami	2002 (JP)	Yes	No	No	No	?
Croket! 2: Yami no Bank to Ban Joou		Konami	2003 (JP)	Yes	No	No	No	?
Croket! 3: Granyuu Oukoku no Nazo		Konami	2003 (JP)	Yes	No	No	No	?
Croket! 4: Bank no Mori no Mamorigami		Konami	2004 (JP)	Yes	No	No	No	?
Crouching Tiger, Hidden Dragon	Ubisoft Shanghai	Ubisoft	2003 (NA)	No	Yes	Yes	?	?
Cruis'n Velocity	Graphic State	Midway Games	2001 (NA)	No	Yes	Yes	No	?
Crushed Baseball	Griptonite Games	Summitsoft Entertainment	2004 (NA)	No	Yes	No	No	?
CT Special Forces	Light & Shadow Production	Light & Shadow Production	2002 (NA)	No	Yes	Yes	?	?
CT Special Forces 2: Back in the Trenches ^{NA} • CT Special Forces 2: Back to Hell ^{PAL}	Light and Shadow Productions	Hip Interactive	2003 (NA)	No	Yes	Yes	?	?
CT Special Forces 3: Bioterror	Light & Shadow Production	Light & Shadow Production	2004 (PAL)	No	No	Yes	?	?
Cubix: Robots for Everyone: Clash 'n Bash	Blitz Games / HumanSoft	The 3DO Company	2001 (NA)	No	Yes	No	No	?
Curious George ^{NA, PAL} • Georges le Petit Curieux ^{FR}	Torus Games	Namco, Electronic Arts	2006 (NA)	No	Yes	Yes	Yes	?
Custom Robo GX	Noise	Nintendo	July 26, 2002 (JP)	Yes	No	No	No	?
Cyber Drive Zoids: Hatakedamono no Senshi Hugh	Amedio	Tomy Corporation	2003 (JP)	Yes	No	No	No	?
Dai-Mahjong		Hori	2001 (JP)	Yes	No	No	No	?
Daisenryaku		Media Kite	2001 (JP)	Yes	No	No	No	?
Daisuki Teddy		MTO	2002 (JP)	Yes	No	No	No	?
Dan Doh!! Tobase Shouri no Smile Shot		Takara	2004 (JP)	Yes	No	No	No	?
Dan Doh!! Xi		GameVillage	2002 (JP)	Yes	No	No	No	?
Dancing Sword: Senkou (Dancing Sword: Flash)		MTO	2003 (JP)	Yes	No	No	No	?
Danny Phantom: The Ultimate Enemy ^{NA, PAL} • Danny Fantome: L'Ultime Ennemi ^{FR}	Altron	THQ	2005 (NA)	No	Yes	Yes	Yes	?
Danny Phantom: Urban Jungle ^{NA, PAL} • Danny Phantom: Dschungelstadt ^{DE}	Altron	THQ	2006 (NA)	No	Yes	Yes	?	?
Daredevil	Griptonite Games	BAM! Entertainment	2003 (NA)	No	Yes	Yes	?	?
Darius R	RideonJapan, Inc.	Pacific Century	2002 (JP)	Yes	No	No	No	?
Dark Arena	Graphic State	Majesco	2002 (NA)	No	Yes	Yes	?	?
Dave Mirra Freestyle BMX 2	Full Fat	Acclaim Entertainment	2003 (NA)	No	Yes	Yes	?	?
Dave Mirra Freestyle BMX 3	Full Fat	Acclaim Entertainment	2004 (NA)	No	Yes	Yes	?	?
David Beckham Soccer	Yoyo Entertainment	Rage Software	2002 (NA)	No	Yes	Yes	?	?
Davis Cup Tennis	Hokus Pokus Games	Ubi Soft	June 7, 2002 (EU); October 15, 2002 (NA)	No	Yes	Yes	?	?
Dead to Rights	Torus Games	Namco, Zoo Digital Publishing	2004 (NA)	No	Yes	Yes	?	?
Deal or No Deal	Gravity-I	Destination Software	July 18, 2007 (NA)	No	Yes	No	No	?
Defender ^{NA} • Defender: For All Mankind ^{PAL}	Outlook Entertainment	Midway Games	November 7, 2002 (NA); March 24, 2003 (EU)	No	Yes	Yes	?	?
Defender of the Crown	Crawfish Interactive	Metro3D	2002 (NA); 2004 (PAL)	No	Yes	Yes	?	?
DemiKids: Dark Version ^{NA} • Shin Megami Tensei: Devil Children Yami no Sho ^{JP}	Multimedia Intelligence Transfer	Atlus	2002 (NA)	Yes	Yes	No	No	?
DemiKids: Light Version ^{NA} • Shin Megami Tensei: Devil Children Hikari no Sho ^{JP}	Multimedia Intelligence Transfer	Atlus	2002 (NA)	Yes	Yes	No	No	?
Demon Driver: Time to Burn Rubber	AIA USA	Majesco	February 14, 2003 (EU); September 22, 2004 (NA)	No	Yes	Yes	?	?
Denki Blocks!	Rage Software	Rage Software / Majesco / Global A	2001 (NA)	Yes	Yes	Yes	?	?
Densetsu no Starfy (Legendary Starfy)	TOSE	Nintendo	September 6, 2002 (JP)	Yes	No	No	No	?
Densetsu no Starfy 2 (Legendary Starfy 2)	TOSE	Nintendo	September 5, 2003 (JP)	Yes	No	No	No	?
Densetsu no Starfy 3 (Legendary Starfy 3)	TOSE	Nintendo	August 5, 2004 (JP)	Yes	No	No	No	?
Derby Stallion Advance	ParityBit	Enterbrain	2002 (JP)	Yes	No	No	No	?
Desert Strike Advance	Budcat Creations	EA Games	2002 (NA)	No	Yes	No	No	?
Dexter's Laboratory: Chess Challenge	Virtucraft	Bam Entertainment	2002 (NA)	No	Yes	Yes	?	?
Dexter's Laboratory: Deesaster Strikes!	Virtucraft	BAM! Entertainment	2001 (NA)	No	Yes	Yes	?	?
DiaDroids World: Evil Teikoku no Yabou		Epoch	2001 (JP)	Yes	No	No	No	?
Di Gi Charat: Di Gi Communication	M2	Broccoli	2002 (JP)	Yes	No	No	No	?
Di Gi Communication 2: Datou! Black GemaGema Dan!	M2	Broccoli	2004 (JP)	Yes	No	No	No	?
Digimon Battle Spirit	Dimps	Bandai	2003 (NA)	No	Yes	Yes	?	?
Digimon Battle Spirit 2	Dimps	Bandai	2003 (NA); 2004 (PAL)	No	Yes	Yes	?	?
Digimon Racing	Griptonite Games	Bandai	2004 (NA)	Yes	Yes	Yes	?	?
Dinotopia: The Timestone Pirates	RFX Interactive	TDK Mediactive	2002 (NA)	No	Yes	Yes	?	?
Disney Princess ^{NA, PAL} • Disney Princesse ^{FR} • Disney Prinzessinnen ^{DE} • Disney Princesas ^{ES} • Disney Principesse ^{IT}	Art	Disney Interactive, THQ	2003 (NA)	No	Yes	Yes	?	?
Disney's Princess Royal Adventure ^{NA, PAL} • Disney Princesses: Aventures Enchantées ^{FR} • Disney Prinzessinnen: Königliches Abenteuer ^{DE}	HumanSoft	Buena Vista Games	2006 (NA)	No	Yes	Yes	?	?
Disney Sports Basketball	Konami	Konami	2002 (NA)	Yes	Yes	Yes	?	?
Disney Sports Football ^{NA} • Disney Sports: American Football ^{JP}	Konami	Konami	2002 (NA)	Yes	Yes	No	No	?
Disney Sports Motocross	Konami	Konami	2002 (NA)	Yes	Yes	Yes	?	?
Disney Sports Skateboarding	Konami	Konami	2002 (NA)	Yes	Yes	Yes	?	?
Disney Sports Snowboarding	Konami	Konami	2002 (NA)	Yes	Yes	Yes	?	?
Disney Sports Soccer ^{NA} • Disney Sports Football ^{PAL}	Konami	Konami	2002 (NA)	Yes	Yes	Yes	?	?
Disney's Aladdin	Capcom	Capcom	2004 (NA)	Yes	Yes	Yes	?	?
Disney's American Dragon: Jake Long - Rise of the Huntsclan	WayForward	Buena Vista Games	2006 (NA)	No	Yes	Yes	?	?
Disney's Atlantis: The Lost Empire ^{NA, PAL} • Atlantide: L'Empire Perdu ^{FR} • Atlantis: Das Geheimnis der verlorenen Stadt ^{DE}	3d6 Games	THQ	2001 (NA)	No	Yes	Yes	?	?
Disney's Brother Bear ^{NA, PAL} • Disney's Frère des Ours ^{FR} • Disney's Bären Brüder ^{DE} • Disney Hermano Oso ^{ES} • Disney Koda Fratello Orso ^{IT}	Vicarious Visions	Disney Interactive, THQ	2003 (NA)	No	Yes	Yes	?	?
Disney's Chicken Little ^{NA, PAL} • Disneys Himmel und Huhn ^{DE}	Artificial Mind and Movement	Buena Vista Games	2005 (NA)	Yes	Yes	Yes	?	?
Disney's Cinderella: Magical Dreams ^{NA, PAL} • Disney Cendrillon: Le Bal Enchanté ^{FR} • Disneys Cinderella: Zauberhafte Träume ^{ES} • Disney La Cenicienta: Sueños Mágicos ^{ES} • Disney Cenerentola: Il Sogno si Avvera! ^{IT}	DC Studios	Buena Vista Games	2005 (NA)	No	Yes	Yes	?	?
Disney's Extreme Skate Adventure	Vicarious Visions	Activision	2003 (NA)	No	Yes	Yes	?	?
Disney's Herbie: Fully Loaded	Climax	Buena Vista Games	2005 (NA)	No	Yes	Yes	?	?
Disney Presents Home on the Range ^{NA}Disney's Home on the Range ^{PAL} • Disney La Ferme se Rebelle ^{FR} • Disney Zafarrancho en el Rancho ^{ES}	Artificial Mind and Movement	Disney Interactive, Buena Vista Games	2004 (NA)	No	Yes	Yes	?	?
Disney's Kim Possible: Revenge of Monkey Fist ^{NA} • Disney's Kim Possible ^{PAL} • Disney's Kim Possible: Monkey Fist's Rache ^{DE}	Digital Eclipse	Disney Interactive, THQ	November 13, 2002 (NA); November 21, 2003 (EU)	No	Yes	Yes	?	?
Disney's Kim Possible 2: Drakken's Demise ^{NA, PAL} • Disney's Kim Possible ^{JP} • Disneys Kim Possible: Dr. Drakkens Untergang ^{DE} • Disney Kim Possible: Contra el Doctor Drakken ^{ES}	Artificial Mind and Movement	Buena Vista Games ^{NA, PAL} / D3 Publisher ^{JP}	September 15, 2004 (NA); July 21, 2005 (JP); March 10, 2006 (EU)	Yes	Yes	Yes	?	?
Disney's Kim Possible 3: Team Possible	Artificial Mind and Movement	Buena Vista Games	August 21, 2005 (NA)	No	Yes	No	No	?
Disney's Lilo & Stitch	Digital Eclipse	Disney Interactive, Ubi Soft	2002 (NA)	No	Yes	Yes	?	?
Disney's Lilo & Stitch 2: Hämsterviel Havoc ^{NA} • Disney's Lilo & Stitch 2 ^{PAL} • Disney's Lilo and Stitch ^{JP}	Firemint	Disney Interactive, Buena Vista Games	2004 (NA)	Yes	Yes	Yes	?	?
Disney's Little Einsteins	InLight Entertainment	Buena Vista Games	2006 (NA)	No	Yes	Yes	?	?
Disney's The Lion King 1 1/2 ^{NA} • Disney's The Lion King ^{PAL} • Disney Le Roi Lion ^{FR} • Disneys Der König der Löwen ^{DE} • Disney El Rey Leon ^{ES} • Disney Il Re Leone ^{IT}	Vicarious Visions	Disney Interactive, THQ	2003 (NA)	No	Yes	Yes	?	?
Disney's The Jungle Book ^{NA} • Disney's The Jungle Book 2 ^{PAL} • Le Livre de la Jungle 2 ^{FR} • Disneys Das Dschungelbuch 2 ^{DE} • Disney el Libro de la Selva 2 ^{ES} • Disney Il Libro Della Giungla 2 ^{IT}	Visual Impact	Ubi Soft	2003 (NA)	No	Yes	Yes	?	?
Disney's Magical Quest Starring Mickey & Minnie ^{NA, PAL} • Disney's Mickey to Minnie no Magical Quest ^{JP}	Capcom, Nintendo	Nintendo	2002 (NA)	Yes	Yes	Yes	?	?
Disney's Magical Quest 2 Starring Mickey and Minnie ^{NA, PAL} • Disney's Mickey to Minnie no Magical Quest 2 ^{JP}	Capcom	Capcom	2003 (NA)	Yes	Yes	Yes	?	?
Disney's Magical Quest 3 Starring Mickey & Donald ^{NA, PAL} • Disney's Mickey to Donald no Magical Quest 3 ^{JP}	Klein Computer Entertainment	Capcom	2005 (NA)	Yes	Yes	Yes	?	?
Disney's Party ^{NA, PAL} • Mickey no Pocket Resort ^{JP}	Jupiter	Tomy, Electronic Arts	2003 (NA/PAL); 2004 (JP)	Yes	Yes	Yes	?	?
Disney's Peter Pan: Return to Never Land ^{NA, PAL} • Peter Pan: Retour au Pays Imaginaire ^{FR} • Disneys Peter Pan: Neue Abenteuer in Nimmerland ^{DE} • Disney Peter Pan: Regreso al País de Nunca Jamás ^{ES} • Disney Peter Pan: Ritorno all Isola che Non c'è ^{IT} • Peter Pan: Terug naar Nooitgedachtland ^{NL}	Crawfish Interactive	Disney Interactive, Ubi Soft	2002 (NA)	No	Yes	Yes	?	?
Disney's Tarzan: Return to the Jungle ^{NA, PAL} • Tarzan: L'Appel de la Jungle ^{FR} • Tarzan: Rüeckkehr in den Dschungel ^{DE}	Digital Eclipse	Activision	2002 (NA)	No	Yes	Yes	?	?
Disney's The Little Mermaid: Magic in Two Kingdoms ^{NA, PAL} • La Petite Sirene: Aventure Magique entre Terre et Mer ^{FR} • Arielle die Meerjungfrau: Ein Meer voller Abenteuer ^{DE} • Disney La Sirenita: Dos Reinos Mágicos ^{ES} • La Sirenetta: Due Mondi di Magia ^{IT} • Disney's De Kleine Zeemeermin: Magie in Twee Werelden ^{NL}	Gorilla Systems	Buena Vista Games	2006 (NA)	No	Yes	Yes	?	?
Disney's Treasure Planet • Disney La Planète au trésor ^{FR} • Disneys Der Schatzplanet ^{DE} • Disney El Planeta del tesoro ^{ES} • Disney Il Pianeta del Tesoro ^{IT} • Disney's Piratenplaneet: De Schat van Kapitein Flint ^{NL}	Bizarre Creations	Disney Interactive. Ubi Soft	2002 (NA)	No	Yes	Yes	?	?
DK: King of Swing ^{NA, PAL} • Bura Bura Donkey ^{JP}	Paon	Nintendo	February 4, 2005 (EU); May 19, 2005 (JP); September 19, 2005 (NA)	Yes	Yes	Yes	Yes	?
Dogz ^{NA, PAL} • Kawaii Koinu: Wonderful ^{JP}	MTO	Ubisoft ^{NA, PAL}, MTO ^{JP}	2004 (NA/JP); 2005 (PAL)	Yes	Yes	Yes	?	?
Dogz 2	MTO	Ubisoft	2007 (NA)	No	Yes	Yes	?	?
Dogz Fashion • Oshare Wanko ^{JP}	MTO	Ubisoft	2005 (NA)	Yes	Yes	Yes	?	?
Dokapon: Monster Hunter ^{NA} • Dokapon: Monster Hunter! ^{PAL} • Dokapon-Q: Monster Hunter! ^{JP}	Asmik Ace Entertainment, Inc	AIA	August 3, 2001 (JP); October 30, 2001 (NA); June 21, 2002 (EU)	Yes	Yes	Yes	?	?
DokiDoki Cooking Series 1: Komugi-Chan no Happy Cake	MTO	MTO	2002 (JP)	Yes	No	No	No	?
DokiDoki Cooking Series 2: Gourmet Kitchen: Suteki na Obentou	MTO	MTO	2003 (JP)	Yes	No	No	No	?
Dokodemo Taikyoku: Yakuman Advance (Play Anywhere Versus Advance)	NDcube	Nintendo	2001 (JP)	Yes	No	No	No	?
Domo-kun no Fushigi Terebi	Suzak	Nintendo	2002 (JP)	Yes	No	No	No	?
Don-Chan Puzzle: Hanabi de Don!	Takumi Corporation	Aruze Corp	2004 (JP)	Yes	No	No	No	?
Donald Duck Advance ^{NA, PAL} • Paperino Advance ^{FR} • Pato Donald Advance ^{ES}	Ubi Soft Shanghai	Ubi Soft	2001 (NA)	Yes	Yes	Yes	?	?
Donkey Kong Country ^{NA, PAL} • Super Donkey Kong ^{JP}	Rare	Nintendo	June 6, 2003 (EU); June 9, 2003 (NA); December 12, 2003 (JP)	Yes	Yes	Yes	Yes	?
Donkey Kong Country 2 ^{NA, PAL} • Super Donkey Kong 2 ^{JP}	Rare	Nintendo	June 25, 2004 (EU); July 1, 2004 (JP); November 15, 2004 (NA)	Yes	Yes	Yes	Yes	?
Donkey Kong Country 3 ^{NA, PAL} • Super Donkey Kong 3 ^{JP}	Rare	Nintendo	November 4, 2005 (EU); November 7, 2005 (NA); December 1, 2005 (JP)	Yes	Yes	Yes	?	?
Doom	David A. Palmer Productions	Activision	2001 (NA)	No	Yes	Yes	?	?
Doom II: Hell on Earth	Torus Games	Activision	2002 (NA)	No	Yes	Yes	Yes	?
Dora the Explorer: The Search for Pirate Pig's Treasure	CinéGroupe	NewKidCo	2002 (NA)	No	Yes	No	No	?
Dora the Explorer: Super Spies	CinéGroupe	Gotham Games	2003 (NA)	No	Yes	No	No	?
Dora the Explorer: Super Star Adventures ^{NA, PAL} • Dora L'exploratrice - Les aventures des super étoiles ^{FR} • Dora the Explorer: Superster Avonturen ^{NL}	ImaginEngine	Global Star Software ^{NA} The Game Factory ^{PAL}	2004 (NA)	No	Yes	Yes	?	?
Dora's World Adventure	Black Lantern Studios	Global Star Software	2006 (NA)	No	Yes	No	No	?
Doraemon Dokodemo Walker (Doraemon Anywhere Walker)		Epoch	2002 (JP)	Yes	No	No	No	?
Doraemon Midori No Wakusei (Doraemon's Green Planet)		Epoch	2001 (JP)	Yes	No	No	No	?
Double Dragon Advance	Million	Atlus	November 12, 2003 (NA); March 5, 2004 (JP)	Yes	Yes	No	No	?
Doubutsujima no Chobi Gurumi	A.I	Rocket Company	2003 (JP)	Yes	No	No	No	?
Doubutsujima no Chobi Gurumi 2: Tama-chan Monogatari	A.I	Rocket Company	2004 (JP)	Yes	No	No	No	?
Downforce	Karma Studios	Titus Interactive	2002 (PAL)	No	No	Yes	?	?
Dr. Mario & Puzzle League ^{NA, PAL} • Dr. Mario & Panel de Pon ^{JP}	Intelligent Systems Nintendo	Nintendo	September 13, 2005 (JP); November 25, 2005 (EU); November 28, 2005 (NA)	Yes	Yes	Yes	?	?
Dr. Muto	Digital Eclipse	Midway	2002 (PAL)	No	No	Yes	?	?
Dr. Seuss: Green Eggs and Ham	Handheld Games	NewKidCo	2003 (NA)	No	Yes	No	No	?
Dr. Seuss: The Cat in the Hat	Jack of All Games	NewKidCo	2005 (NA)	No	Yes	No	No	?
Dr. Seuss' The Cat in the Hat ^{NA} • The Cat in the Hat ^{PAL}	Digital Eclipse	Vivendi Universal Games	2003 (NA); 2004 (PAL)	No	Yes	Yes	?	?
Dr. Sudoku ^{NA, PAL} • Minna no Soft Series: Numpla Advance ^{JP}	Success	Success, Mastiff, 505 GameStreet	2006 (NA)	Yes	Yes	Yes	?	?
Dragon Ball: Advanced Adventure	Dimps	Atari, Bandai, Banpresto	2004 (JP); 2005 (PAL/KOR); 2006 (NA)	Yes	Yes	Yes	?	?
Dragon Ball Z: Buu's Fury	Webfoot	Atari	2004 (NA)	No	Yes	No	No	?
Dragon Ball Z: Collectible Card Game	ImaginEngine	Infogrames	2002 (NA)	No	Yes	No	No	?
Dragon Ball Z: The Legacy of Goku ^{NA, PAL} • Dragon Ball Z: L'Héritage de Goku ^{FR} • Dragon Ball Z: Das Erbe von Goku ^{DE} • Dragon Ball Z: El Legado del Goku ^{ES} • Dragon Ball Z: Il Destino di Goku ^{IT}	Webfoot	Infogrames	2002 (NA)	No	Yes	Yes	?	?
Dragon Ball Z: The Legacy of Goku II ^{NA, PAL} • Dragon Ball Z: L'Héritage de Goku II ^{FR} • Dragon Ball Z: Das Erbe von Goku II ^{DE} • Dragon Ball Z: El Legado del Goku II ^{ES} • Dragon Ball Z: Il Destino di Goku II ^{IT}	Webfoot	Atari, Infogrames	2003 (NA)	Yes	Yes	Yes	?	?
Dragon Ball Z: Supersonic Warriors ^{NA, PAL} • Dragon Ball Z: Bukuu Tougeki ^{JP} • Dragon Ball Z: Moogongtoogeuk ^{KR}	Arc System Works	Atari, Bandai, Banpresto	2004 (NA)	Yes	Yes	Yes	No	Yes
Dragon Ball Z: Taiketsu	Webfoot	Atari, Bandai	2004 (NA)	No	Yes	Yes	?	?
Dragon Ball GT: Transformation	Webfoot	Atari	2005 (NA)	No	Yes	No	No	?
Dragon Drive: World D Break	Zero One	Banpresto	July 18, 2003 (JP)	Yes	No	No	No	?
Dragon Quest Characters: Toruneko no Daibouken 2 Advance	Chunsoft	Square	December 20, 2001 (JP)	Yes	No	No	No	?
Dragon Quest Characters: Torneko no Daibōken 3 Advance - Fushigi no Dungeon	Rakish	Square Enix	June 24, 2004 (JP)	Yes	No	No	No	?
Dragon Quest Monsters: Caravan Heart	TOSE	Square Enix	March 29, 2003 (JP)	Yes	No	No	No	?
Dragon Tales: Dragon Adventures	Handheld Games	NewKidCo	2001 (NA)	No	Yes	No	No	?
Dragon's Rock ^{PAL} • Dragon's Rock: Drachenfels ^{DE}	Independent Arts	East Entertainment Media	2006 (PAL)	No	No	Yes	?	?
Drake & Josh	Artificial Mind and Movement	THQ	March 13, 2007 (NA)	No	Yes	No	No	?
Drill Dozer ^{NA} • Screw Breaker: Goushin Dorirurero ^{JP}	Game Freak	Nintendo	September 22, 2005 (JP); February 6, 2006 (NA)	Yes	Yes	No	No	?
Driv3r	V3D Production	Atari	2005 (NA)	No	Yes	Yes	?	?
Driven	Crawfish Interactive	BAM! Entertainment	December 11, 2001 (NA); December 14, 2001 (PAL)	No	Yes	Yes	?	?
Driver 2 Advance	Sennari Interactive	Infogrames	2002 (NA)	No	Yes	Yes	Yes	?
Drome Racers	Möbius Entertainment	THQ	April 11, 2003 (EU); June 19, 2003 (NA)	No	Yes	Yes	?	?
Droopy's Tennis Open	Bit Managers	Light & Shadow production	2002 (PAL)	No	No	Yes	?	?
Dual Blades	Vivid Image	Metro3D	October 7, 2002 (NA); December 25, 2002 (JP)	Yes	Yes	No	No	?
Duel Masters	Amble	Takara	2003 (JP)	Yes	No	No	No	?
Duel Masters: Kaijudo Showdown	Mistic Software	Atari	2004 (NA)	No	Yes	Yes	?	?
Duel Masters: Sempai Legends	Mistic Software	Atari	2004 (NA)	No	Yes	Yes	?	?
Duel Masters: Shadow of the Code	Mistic Software	Atari	2004 (PAL); 2005 (NA)	No	Yes	Yes	?	?
Duel Masters 2: Invincible Advance	Amble	Atlus	2004 (JP)	Yes	No	No	No	?
Duel Masters 2: Kirifuda Shoubu Version	Amble	Atlus	2004 (JP)	Yes	No	No	No	?
Duel Masters 3	Amble	Atlus	2004 (JP)	Yes	No	No	No	?
Duke Nukem Advance	Torus Games	Take-Two Interactive	2002 (NA)	No	Yes	Yes	?	?
Dungeons & Dragons: Eye of the Beholder	Pronto Games	Infogrames	November 8, 2002 (NA)	No	Yes	Yes	No	?
Dynasty Warriors Advance • Shin Sangoku Musou Advance ^{JP}	TOSE	Koei	2005 (NA)	Yes	Yes	Yes	?	?
Earthworm Jim	Game Titan	Majesco	2001 (NA)	No	Yes	Yes	?	?
Earthworm Jim 2	Super Empire	Majesco	2002 (NA)	No	Yes	Yes	?	?
Ecks vs. Sever	Crawfish Interactive	Bam Entertainment	2001 (NA)	No	Yes	Yes	?	?
Ed, Edd n Eddy: Jawbreakers!	Crawfish Interactive	BAM! Entertainment	2003 (NA)	No	Yes	Yes	Yes	?
Ed, Edd n Eddy: The Mis-Edventures	Artificial Mind and Movement	Midway Games	2005 (NA)	No	Yes	Yes	?	?
Egg Mania: Eggstreme Madness ^{NA} • Eggo Mania ^{PAL} • Tsukande! Mawashite! Dossun Pazuru Eggo Mania ^{JP}	HotGen	Kemco	2002 (NA)	Yes	Yes	Yes	?	?
Elemix!	SIMS	SIMS Co., Ltd.	2003 (JP)	Yes	No	No	No	?
Elevator Action Old & New	Taito Corporation	Media Kite	2002 (JP)	Yes	No	No	No	?
Elf: The Movie	HumanSoft	Crave Entertainment, Play It! Ltd.	2004 (NA); 2005 (PAL)	No	Yes	Yes	?	?
Elf Bowling 1 & 2	Black Lantern Studios	Ignition Entertainment	2005 (NA)	No	Yes	No	No	?
Enchanted: Once Upon Andalasia	Artificial Mind and Movement	Disney Interactive Studios	2007 (NA)	No	Yes	No	No	?
Eragon	Amaze Entertainment	Vivendi Games	2006 (NA)	No	Yes	Yes	?	?
Erementar Gerad: Huuin Sarashi Kyou (Elemental Gelade: Tozasareshi Uta)	Jupiter	Tomy	2005 (JP)	Yes	No	No	No	?
ESPN Final Round Golf 2002 ^{NA} • ESPN Final Round Golf ^{PAL} • JGTO Golf Master: Japan Tour Golf Game ^{JP}	Konami Computer Entertainment Nagoya	Konami	2001 (NA)	Yes	Yes	Yes	?	?
ESPN Great Outdoor Games: Bass 2002 ^{NA} • ESPN Great Outdoor Games: Bass Tournament ^{PAL} • Exciting Bass ^{JP}	Konami	Konami	2002 (NA)	Yes	Yes	Yes	?	?
ESPN International Winter Sports 2002 ^{NA} • ESPN International Winter Sports ^{PAL} • Hyper Sports 2002 Winter ^{JP}	Konami	Konami	2002 (NA)	Yes	Yes	Yes	?	?
ESPN Winter X-Games Snowboarding 2002 ^{NA, JP} • ESPN Winter X-Games Snowboarding 2 ^{PAL}	KCEO	Konami	2002 (NA)	Yes	Yes	Yes	?	?
ESPN X Games Skateboarding	Konami Honolulu Studio	Konami	2001 (NA)	Yes	Yes	Yes	?	?
E.T. The Extra Terrestrial ^{NA, PAL} • E.T. el extraterrestre ^{FR}	Fluid Studios	NewKidCo, Ubi Soft	2001 (NA)	No	Yes	Yes	?	?
European Super League	Aqua Pacific	Virgin Interactive	2001 (PAL)	No	No	Yes	?	?
everGirl	Artificial Mind and Movement	THQ	2005 (NA)	No	Yes	No	No	?
EX Monopoly	Mobile21	Takara	2001 (JP)	Yes	No	No	No	?
Extreme Ghostbusters: Code Ecto-1	Magic Pockets	Light &N Shadow Production, DreamCatcher Interactive	2002 (NA)	No	Yes	Yes	?	?
Extreme Mahjong Deluxe: Terminator 21 (Goku Mahjong Deluxe: Mirai Senshi 21)		Athenag	2001 (JP)	Yes	No	No	No	?
Eyeshield 21: Devilbats Devildays	Eighting	Nintendo	2006 (JP)	Yes	No	No	No	?
EZ-Talk Shokyuuhen 1	NDcube	KeyNet	2001 (JP)	Yes	No	No	No	?
EZ-Talk Shokyuuhen 2	NDcube	KeyNet	2001 (JP)	Yes	No	No	No	?
EZ-Talk Shokyuuhen 3	NDcube	KeyNet	2001 (JP)	Yes	No	No	No	?
EZ-Talk Shokyuuhen 4	NDcube	KeyNet	2001 (JP)	Yes	No	No	No	?
EZ-Talk Shokyuuhen 5d	NDcube	KeyNet	2001 (JP)	Yes	No	No	No	?
EZ-Talk Shokyuuhen 6	NDcube	KeyNet	2001 (JP)	Yes	No	No	No	?
F1 2002	Visual Science	EA Sports	2002 (NA)	No	Yes	Yes	?	?
F-14 Tomcat	Virtucraft	Majesco	2001 (NA)	No	Yes	Yes	?	?
F24: Stealth Fighter	Skyworks Technologies	Majesco	2006 (NA)	No	Yes	No	No	?
The Fairly OddParents: Breakin' Da Rules	Helixe	THQ	2003 (NA)	No	Yes	No	No	?
The Fairly OddParents: Clash with Anti-World ^{NA, PAL} • Cosmo & Wanda - Wenn Elfen Helfen!: Die Anti-Welt ^{DE} • Los Padrinos Magicos: Contra el Anti-Mundo ^{ES}	Razorback Developments	THQ	2005 (NA)	No	Yes	Yes	?	?
The Fairly OddParents: Enter the Cleft	Altron	THQ	2002 (NA)	No	Yes	No	No	?
The Fairly OddParents: Shadow Showdown ^{NA, PAL} • Cosmo & Wanda: Wenn Elfen Helfen! Das Schattenduell ^{DE}	Helixe	THQ	2004 (NA)	No	Yes	Yes	Yes	?
F-Zero Climax	Suzak	Nintendo	October 21, 2004 (JP)	Yes	No	No	No	?
F-Zero: GP Legend ^{NA, PAL} • F-Zero: Falcon Densetsu ^{JP}	Suzak	Nintendo	November 28, 2003 (JP); June 4, 2004 (EU); September 20, 2004 (NA)	Yes	Yes	Yes	?	?
F-Zero: Maximum Velocity ^{NA, PAL} • F-Zero ^{JP}	NDcube	Nintendo	March 21, 2001 (JP); June 11, 2001 (NA); June 22, 2001 (PAL)	Yes	Yes	Yes	?	?
Famicom Mini: Balloon Fight	Nintendo	Nintendo	May 21, 2004 (JP)	Yes	No	No	No	?
Famicom Mini: Clu Clu Land	Nintendo	Nintendo	May 21, 2004 (JP)	Yes	No	No	No	?
Famicom Mini: Dai-2-ji Super Robot Taisen	Banpresto	Nintendo	December 16, 2004 (JP)	Yes	No	No	No	?
Famicom Mini: Dig Dug	Namco	Nintendo	May 21, 2004 (JP)	Yes	No	No	No	?
Famicom Mini: Hikari Shinwa: Palthena no Kagami (Kid Icarus)	Nintendo	Nintendo	August 10, 2004 (JP)	Yes	No	No	No	?
Famicom Mini: Famicom Mukashi Banashi - Shin Onigashima Zenkouhen	Nintendo	Nintendo	August 10, 2004 (JP)	Yes	No	No	No	?
Famicom Mini: Famicom Tantei Club - Kieta Koukeisha Zenkouhen	Nintendo	Nintendo	August 10, 2004 (JP)	Yes	No	No	No	?
Famicom Mini: Famicom Tantei Club Part II - Ushiro ni Tatsu Shoujo Zenkouhen	Nintendo	Nintendo	August 10, 2004 (JP)	Yes	No	No	No	?
Famicom Mini: Mappy	Namco	Nintendo	February 14, 2004 (JP)	Yes	No	No	No	?
Famicom Mini: Makaimura (Ghosts 'n Goblins)	Capcom	Nintendo	May 21, 2004 (JP)	Yes	No	No	No	?
Famicom Mini: Mario Bros.	Nintendo	Nintendo	May 21, 2004 (JP)	Yes	No	No	No	?
Famicom Mini: Ganbare Goemon! Karakuri Douchuu	Konami	Nintendo	May 21, 2004 (JP)	Yes	No	No	No	?
Famicom Mini: Kidou Senshi Z Gundam - Hot Scramble	Bandai	Nintendo	March 18, 2004 (JP)	Yes	No	No	No	?
Famicom Mini: Nazo no Murasame-Jou (The Mysterious Murasame Castle)	Nintendo	Nintendo	August 10, 2004 (JP)	Yes	No	No	No	?
Famicom Mini: SD Gundam World Gachapon Senshi - Scramble Wars	Bandai	Nintendo	August 10, 2004 (JP)	Yes	No	No	No	?
Famicom Mini: Star Soldier	Hudson Soft	Nintendo	February 14, 2004 (JP)	Yes	No	No	No	?
Famicom Mini: Super Mario Bros. 2	Nintendo	Nintendo	August 10, 2004 (JP)	Yes	No	No	No	?
Famicom Mini: Takahashi Meijin no Bouken-jima (Adventure Island)	Hudson Soft	Nintendo	May 21, 2004 (JP)	Yes	No	No	No	?
Famicom Mini: Twinbee	Konami	Nintendo	May 21, 2004 (JP)	Yes	No	No	No	?
Famicom Mini: Wrecking Crew	Nintendo	Nintendo	May 21, 2004 (JP)	Yes	No	No	No	?
Family Feud	Atomic Planet	Global Star Software	October 12, 2006 (NA)	No	Yes	No	No	?
Family Tennis Advance	Natsume Co., Ltd.	Namco	2002 (JP)	Yes	No	No	No	?
Famista Advance		Namco	2002 (JP)	Yes	No	No	No	?
Fancy Pocket		Jorudan	2002 (JP)	Yes	No	No	No	?
Fantastic 4 ^{NA, PAL} • Les Fantastiques 4 ^{FR} • I Fantastici 4 ^{IT} • Los 4 Fantásticos ^{ES} • I Fantastici 4 ^{IT}	Torus Games	Activision	2005 (NA)	No	Yes	Yes	?	?
Fantastic Four: Flame On ^{NA, PAL} • Les Fantastiques 4: Flame On ^{FR} • Los 4 Fantásticos: ¡Llamas a mí! ^{ES} • I Fantastici 4: Flame On ^{IT}	Torus Games	Activision	2005 (NA)	No	Yes	Yes	?	?
Fantastic Children	Inti Creates	Bandai	2005 (JP)	Yes	No	No	No	?
Fantastic Marchen: Keaki Okusan Monogatari	Culture Brain	Culture Brain	2002 (JP)	Yes	No	No	No	?
Fear Factor: Unleashed	DC Studios	Hip Games	2004 (NA)	No	Yes	No	No	?
Field of Nine: Digital Edition 2001	Konami	Konami	2001 (JP)	Yes	No	No	No	?
FIFA Football 2003	Exient Entertainment	EA Sports	2002 (NA)	No	Yes	Yes	?	?
FIFA Football 2004	Exient Entertainment	EA Sports	2003 (NA)	No	Yes	Yes	?	?
FIFA Football 2005	Exient Entertainment	EA Sports	2004 (NA)	No	Yes	Yes	Yes	?
FIFA 06	Exient Entertainment	EA Sports	2005 (NA)	No	Yes	Yes	?	?
FIFA 07	Exient Entertainment	EA Sports	2006 (NA)	No	Yes	Yes	?	?
FIFA World Cup: Germany 2006	Exient Entertainment	EA Sports	2006 (NA)	No	Yes	Yes	No	?
FightBox	Gamezlab	BBC Multimedia	2004 (PAL)	No	No	Yes	?	?
FILA Decathlon	Athletic Design AB	THQ	2002 (PAL)	No	No	Yes	?	?
Final Fantasy I & II: Dawn of Souls ^{NA, PAL} • Final Fantasy I & II Advance ^{JP}	TOSE	Square Enix (Japan), Nintendo (overseas)	July 29, 2004 (JP); November 18, 2004 (AU); November 29, 2004 (NA); December 3, 2004 (EU)	Yes	Yes	Yes	?	?
Final Fantasy IV Advance	TOSE	Square Enix (Japan), Nintendo (overseas)	December 12, 2005 (NA); December 15, 2005 (JP); June 2, 2006 (EU)	Yes	Yes	Yes	?	?
Final Fantasy V Advance	TOSE	Square Enix (Japan), Nintendo (overseas)	October 12, 2006 (JP); November 6, 2006 (NA); April 20, 2007 (EU)	Yes	Yes	Yes	?	?
Final Fantasy VI Advance	TOSE	Square Enix (Japan), Nintendo (overseas)	November 30, 2006 (JP); February 5, 2007 (NA); July 6, 2007 (PAL)	Yes	Yes	Yes	?	?
Final Fantasy Tactics Advance	Square	Square Enix (Japan), Nintendo (overseas)	February 14, 2003 (JP); September 8, 2003 (NA); October 24, 2003 (EU)	Yes	Yes	Yes	Yes	?
Final Fight One	Capcom	Capcom	May 25, 2001 (JP); September 26, 2001 (NA); September 28, 2001 (EU)	Yes	Yes	Yes	?	?
Finding Nemo ^{NA, PAL} • Le Monde de Nemo ^{FR} • Findet Nemo ^{DE} • Buscando a Nemo ^{ES} • Alla Ricerca Di Nemo ^{IT}	Vicarious Visions	THQ	May 9, 2003 (NA); September 3, 2003 (AU); September 26, 2003 (EU)	Yes	Yes	Yes	?	?
Finding Nemo: The Continuing Adventures ^{NA, PAL} • Finding Nemo: Arata na Bouken ^{JP} • Le Monde de Nemo: L'Aventure Continue ^{FR} • Findet Nemo: Das Abenteuer Geht Weiter ^{DE} • Buscando a Nemo: La Aventura Continúa ^{ES} • Alla Ricerca Di Nemo: L'Avventura Continua! ^{IT}	Altron	THQ	September 8, 2004 (NA); November 12, 2004 (EU); November 19, 2004 (JP)	Yes	Yes	Yes	?	?
Fire Emblem: Fuuin no Tsurugi (Fire Emblem: The Binding Blade)	Intelligent Systems	Nintendo	March 29, 2002 (JP)	Yes	No	No	No	?
Fire Emblem ^{NA, PAL} • Fire Emblem: Rekka no Ken ^{JP}	Intelligent Systems	Nintendo	April 25, 2003 (JP); November 6, 2003 (NA); July 16, 2004 (EU)	Yes	Yes	Yes	Yes	?
Fire Emblem: The Sacred Stones ^{NA, PAL} • Fire Emblem: Seima no Kousek ^{JP}	Intelligent Systems	Nintendo	October 7, 2004 (JP); May 23, 2005 (NA); November 4, 2005 (EU)	Yes	Yes	Yes	Yes	?
Fire Pro Wrestling ^{NA, PAL} • Fire Pro Wrestling A ^{JP}	Vaill	BAM! Entertainment	2001 (NA)	Yes	Yes	Yes	?	?
Fire Pro Wrestling 2 ^{NA} • Final Fire ProWrestling: Yume no Dantai Unei! ^{JP}	Spike	BAM! Entertainment	2002 (NA)	Yes	Yes	No	No	?
The Flintstones: Big Trouble in Bedrock	H2O Entertainment	Crave Entertainment	2001 (NA)	No	Yes	Yes	?	?
Flushed Away ^{NA, PAL} • Souris City ^{FR} • Flutsch und Weg ^{DE} • Ratónpolis ^{ES} • Giù per il Tubo ^{IT}	Altron	D3 Publisher	2006 (NA)	No	Yes	Yes	?	?
Football Mania ^{PAL} • Soccer Mania ^{NA}	Tiertex Design Studios	Electronic Arts, Lego Interactive	2002 (NA)	No	Yes	Yes	?	?
Ford Racing 3	Visual Impact	Empire Interactive	November 4, 2005 (NA)	No	Yes	Yes	?	?
Formation Soccer 2002		Spike	2002 (JP)	Yes	No	No	No	?
Fortress	Pipe Dream Interactive	Majesco	2001 (NA)	No	Yes	Yes	?	?
Foster's Home for Imaginary Friends	Collision Studios	Crave Entertainment	2006 (NA)	No	Yes	Yes	?	?
Franklin the Turtle	InterActive Vision Games	The Game Factory	2005 (NA)	No	Yes	Yes	?	?
Franklin's Great Adventures ^{NA, PAL} • Les Grandes Aventures de Franklin ^{FR}	Neko Entertainment	The Game Factory	2006 (NA)	No	Yes	Yes	?	?
Freekstyle	Full Fat	Destination Software	2003 (NA)	No	Yes	Yes	?	?
Frogger Advance: The Great Quest	KCEA	Konami	2002 (NA)	No	Yes	Yes	?	?
Frogger's Adventures: Temple of the Frog	Konami Software Shanghai	Konami	2001 (NA)	No	Yes	Yes	?	?
Frogger's Adventures 2: The Lost Wand ^{NA, PAL} • Frogger: Mahou no Kuni no Daibouken ^{JP}	Konami	Konami	2002 (NA); 2003 (PAL/JP)	Yes	Yes	Yes	?	?
Frogger's Journey: The Forgotten Relic ^{NA} • Frogger: Kodaibunmei no Nazo ^{JP}	Konami	Konami	2003 (NA); 2004 (JP)	Yes	Yes	No	No	?
From TV animation - One Piece: Mezase! King of Berry		Banpresto	2003 (JP)	Yes	No	No	No	?
From TV animation - One Piece: Nanatsu-jima no Dai-hihō ^{JP} (One Piece: Big Secret Treasure of the Seven Phantom Islands) • One Piece: Ilgop Seomui Debomool ^{KR}		Banpresto	2002 (NA)	Yes	No	No	No	Yes
Fruits Mura no Doubutsu Tachi		TDK Core	2004 (JP)	Yes	No	No	No	?
Fushigi no Kuni no Alice (Alice's Adventures in Wonderland)		Global A	2003 (JP)	Yes	No	No	No	?
Fushigi no Kuni no Angelique (Angelique's Adventures in Wonderland)		Koei	2002 (JP)	Yes	No	No	No	?
Futari wa Pretty Cure: Ariena~i! Yume no Sono wa Daimeikyuu		Bandai	2004 (JP)	Yes	No	No	No	?
Futari Wa Pretty Cure Max Heart: Maji? Maji!? Fight de IN Janai		Bandai	2005 (JP)	Yes	No	No	No	?
Gachasute! Dino Device Blue	A.I	Smilesoft	2002 (JP)	Yes	No	No	No	?
Gachasute! Dino Device Red	A.I	Smilesoft	2002 (JP)	Yes	No	No	No	?
Gachasute! Dino Device 2: Dragon	A.I	Rocket Company	2003 (JP)	Yes	No	No	No	?
Gachasute! Dino Device 2: Phoenix	A.I	Rocket Company	2003 (JP)	Yes	No	No	No	?
Gachinko Pro Yakyuu		Now Production	2002 (JP)	Yes	No	No	No	?
Gadget Racers ^{NA} • Penny Racers ^{PAL} • Choro Q Advance ^{JP}	Electronics Application	Konami	October 27, 2001 (JP/NA/EU/PAL)	Yes	Yes	Yes	?	?
Gakkou no Kaidan: Hyakuyoubako no Fuuin		TDK Core	2004 (JP)	Yes	No	No	No	?
Gakkou O Tsukurou!! Advance		Victor	2001 (JP)	Yes	No	No	No	?
Gakuen Alice: DokiDoki Fushigi Taiken	Rokumendo	Kids Station	2004 (JP)	Yes	No	No	No	?
Gakuen Senki Muryou		MTO	2003 (JP)	Yes	No	No	No	?
Galaxy Angel		Marvelous Entertainment	2002 (JP)	Yes	No	No	No	?
Galidor: Defenders of the Outer Dimension	Tiertex Design Studios	Electronic Arts, Lego Interactive	2002 (NA)	No	Yes	No	No	?
Game & Watch Gallery 4 ^{NA} • Game & Watch Gallery Advance ^{PAL}	TOSE	Nintendo	October 25, 2002 (EU); October 28, 2002 (NA)	No	Yes	Yes	?	?
The Game of Life / Yahtzee / Payday	Black Lantern Studios	Destination Software	2005 (NA)	No	Yes	Yes	?	?
Games Explosion	FrontLine Studios	THQ	March 23, 2006 (NA)	No	Yes	No	No	?
Ganbare! Dodge Fighters	Kamui	Bandai	2005 (JP)	Yes	No	No	No	?
Garfield: The Search for Pooky ^{NA, PAL} • Garfield a la Recherche de Pooky ^{FR}	InterActive Vision Games	The Game Factory	2005 (NA)	No	Yes	Yes	?	?
Garfield and His Nine Lives ^{NA, PAL} • Garfield et ses Neuf Vies ^{FR} • Garfield und seine Neun Leben ^{DE}	Lucky Jump	The Game Factory	2006 (NA)	No	Yes	Yes	?	?
Gauntlet / Rampart	EC Interactive Games	DSI Games	November 3, 2005 (NA/EU/PAL)	No	Yes	Yes	?	?
Gauntlet Dark Legacy	Pocket Studios	Midway	November 25, 2002 (NA)	No	Yes	No	No	?
Gegege no Kitarou: Kiki Ippatsu! Youkai Rettou		Konami	2003 (JP)	Yes	No	No	No	?
Gekido Advance: Kintaro's Revenge	Naps Team	Destination Software	November 8, 2002 (EU); November 25, 2003 (NA)	No	Yes	Yes	?	?
Gekitou Densetsu Noah: Dream Management (Dream Management)		Game Village	2003 (JP)	Yes	No	No	No	?
Gem Smashers ^{NA} • Pazunin: Uminin no Puzzle de Nimu ^{JP}	Frame Studios Interactive	Metro3D	July 1, 2003 (NA); November 21, 2003 (JP)	Yes	Yes	No	No	?
Genseishin Justirisers: Souchaku! Chikyuu no Senshitachi	WinkySoft	Konami	2004 (JP)	Yes	No	No	No	?
Gensou Maden Saiyuki: Hangyaku no Toshin Taishi		Digital Kids	2003 (JP)	Yes	No	No	No	?
Gensō Suikoden Card Stories	Will	Konami	2001 (JP)	Yes	No	No	No	?
Get Ride! AMDriver: Senkou no Hero Tanjou	WinkySoft	Konami	2004 (JP)	Yes	No	No	No	?
Get Ride! AMDriver: Shutsugeki! Battle Party	KCEJ	Konami	2004 (JP)	Yes	No	No	No	?
GET! Boku no Mushi Tsukamaete	Wizard	Kemco	2003 (JP)	Yes	No	No	No	?
GetBackers Dakkanya: Jagan Fuuin!		Konami	2003 (JP)	Yes	No	No	No	?
GetBackers Dakkanya: Jigoku no Scaramouche	Konami	Konami	2001 (JP)	Yes	No	No	No	?
GetBackers Dakkanya: Metropolis Dakkan Sakusen!		Konami	2003 (JP)	Yes	No	No	No	?
Ghost Rider	Magic Pockets	2K Games	2006 (NA)	No	Yes	Yes	?	?
Ghost Trap	Artoon	Eidos Interactive	2002 (JP)	Yes	No	No	No	?
Glucoboy	Sensory Sweep	Guidance Interactive	December 1, 2007 (AU)	No	No	No	Yes	No
Go! Go! Beckham! Adventure on Soccer Island	Denki	Rage Software	2002 (PAL)	No	No	Yes	?	?
Godzilla: Domination! ^{NA, PAL} • Gojira: Kaijuu Dairantou Advance ^{JP}	WayForward	Infogrames	2002 (NA)	Yes	Yes	Yes	?	?
Goemon: New Age Shutsudou!	Konami	Konami	February 28, 2002 (JP)	Yes	No	No	No	?
Golden Nugget Casino	Pipe Dream Interactive	Majesco	November 16, 2004 (NA); March 30, 2005 (EU)	No	Yes	Yes	No	?
Golden Sun ^{NA, PAL} • Ougon no Taiyou: Hirakareshi Fuuin ^{JP}	Camelot Software Planning	Nintendo	August 1, 2001 (JP); November 11, 2001 (NA); February 22, 2002 (EU)	Yes	Yes	Yes	?	?
Golden Sun: The Lost Age ^{NA, PAL} • Ougon no Taiyou: Ushinawareshi Toki ^{JP} • Golden Sun: L'Âge Perdu ^{FR} • Golden Sun: Die Vergessene Epoche ^{DE} • Golden Sun: La Edad Perdida ^{ES} • Golden Sun: L'Era Perduta ^{IT}	Camelot Software Planning	Nintendo	June 28, 2002 (JP); April 14, 2003 (NA); September 19, 2003 (EU)	Yes	Yes	Yes	Yes	?
Gradius Galaxies ^{NA} • Gradius Advance ^{PAL} • Gradius Generation ^{JP}	Konami	Konami	November 9, 2001 (EU); November 30, 2001 (NA); January 17, 2002 (JP)	Yes	Yes	Yes	?	?
Granbo		Capcom	2001 (JP)	Yes	No	No	No	?
Grand Theft Auto Advance	Digital Eclipse	Rockstar Games	2004 (NA)	No	Yes	Yes	?	?
Greg Hastings' Tournament Paintball MAX'D	WXP	Activision Value	2006 (NA)	No	Yes	No	No	?
Gremlins: Stripe vs Gizmo	Magic Pockets	DreamCatcher Interactive	2002 (NA)	No	Yes	Yes	?	?
The Grim Adventures of Billy & Mandy	Full Fat	Midway Games	2006 (NA)	No	Yes	No	No	?
Groove Adventure Rave: Hikari to Yami no Daikessen	KCEJ	Konami	2002 (JP)	Yes	No	No	No	?
GT Advance Championship Racing ^{NA, PAL} Advance GTA ^{JP}	MTO	THQ	March 21, 2001 (JP); June 11, 2001 (NA); June 22, 2001 (PAL)	Yes	Yes	Yes	?	?
GT Advance 2: Rally Racing ^{NA, PAL} Advance Rally ^{JP}	MTO	THQ	December 7, 2001 (JP); June 18, 2002 (NA); June 28, 2002 (EU)	Yes	Yes	Yes	?	?
GT Advance 3: Pro Concept Racing ^{NA, PAL} Advance GT2 ^{JP}	MTO	THQ	April 26, 2002 (JP); February 4, 2003 (NA); May 23, 2003 (EU)	Yes	Yes	Yes	?	?
GT Racers	Aqua Pacific	Liquid Games	2006 (PAL)	No	No	Yes	?	?
Guilty Gear X: Advance Edition	Arc System Works	Sammy Studios	2002 (NA)	Yes	Yes	Yes	?	?
Gumby vs. the Astrobots	Torus Games	Namco	July 29, 2005 (NA)	No	Yes	No	No	?
Gunstar Super Heroes ^{NA, JP} • Gunstar Future Heroes ^{PAL}	Treasure Co. Ltd	Sega	October 6, 2005 (JP); October 25, 2005 (NA); November 4, 2005 (EU)	Yes	Yes	Yes	?	?
Guru Logi Champ	Compile	Compile	2001 (JP)	Yes	No	No	No	?
Gyakuten Saiban	Capcom	Capcom	October 12, 2001 (JP)	Yes	No	No	No	?
Gyakuten Saiban 2	Capcom	Capcom	October 18, 2002 (JP)	Yes	No	No	No	?
Gyakuten Saiban 3	Capcom	Capcom	January 23, 2004 (JP)	Yes	No	No	No	?
Hachiemon	Natsume Co., Ltd.	Namco	2003 (JP)	Yes	No	No	No	?
Hagane no Renkinjutsushi: Meisou no Rinbukyoku	Tom Create	Bandai	2004 (JP)	Yes	No	No	No	?
Hagane no Renkinjutsushi: Omoide no Soumeikyoku (Fullmetal Alchemist: Omoide no Sonata)	Tom Create	Bandai	2004 (JP)	Yes	No	No	No	?
Hajime no Ippo: The Fighting	Treasure Co. Ltd	ESP Software	2002 (JP)	Yes	No	No	No	?
Hamepane Tokyo Mew Mew	WinkySoft	Takara	2002 (JP)	Yes	No	No	No	?
Hamster Club 4: Shigessa Daidassou	Nekogumi	Jorudan	2003 (JP)	Yes	No	No	No	?
Hamster Monogatari 2 GBA	Culture Brain	Culture Brain	2001 (JP)	Yes	No	No	No	?
Hamster Monogatari 3 GBA	Culture Brain	Culture Brain	2002 (JP)	Yes	No	No	No	?
Hamster Monogatari 3EX, 4, Special	Culture Brain	Culture Brain	2003 (JP)	Yes	No	No	No	?
Hamster Monogatari Collection	Culture Brain	Culture Brain	2003 (JP)	Yes	No	No	No	?
Hamster Paradise: Pure Heart	Digital Kids	Atlus	2003 (JP)	Yes	No	No	No	?
Hamster Paradise Advanchu	Digital Kids	Atlus	2002 (JP)	Yes	No	No	No	?
Hamtaro: Ham-Ham Games ^{NA, PAL} • Tottoko Hamutarou: Hamu-Hamu Sports ^{JP}	AlphaDream	Nintendo	2004 (NA/JP/PAL)	Yes	Yes	Yes	?	?
Hamtaro: Ham-Ham Heartbreak ^{NA, PAL} • Tottoko Hamutaro 3: Love Love Daibōken Dechu ^{JP}	Pax Softnica	Nintendo	2002 (JP); 2003 (NA/PAL)	Yes	Yes	Yes	Yes	?
Hamtaro: Rainbow Rescue ^{PAL} • Tottoko Hamtaro 4: Nijiiro Daikoushin Dechu ^{JP}	AlphaDream	Nintendo	2003 (JP); 2004 (PAL)	Yes	No	Yes	?	?
Hanabi Hyakkei Advance		Aruze	2004 (JP)	Yes	No	No	No	?
Hanafuda Trump Mahjong: Depachika Wayounaka		Global A	2002 (JP)	Yes	No	No	No	?
Happy Feet	Artificial Mind and Movement	Midway Games	2006 (NA)	No	Yes	Yes	?	?
Hardcore Pinball	Paragon 5	Telegames	December 16, 2002 (NA)	No	Yes	Yes	No	?
Hardcore Pool	FrontLine Studios	Neko Entertainment	2004 (PAL)	No	No	Yes	?	?
Harlem Globetrotters: World Tour	DSI Games	DSI Games	2006 (NA)	No	Yes	Yes	?	?
Harobots: Robo Hero Battling!!		Sunrise Interactive	2002 (JP)	Yes	No	No	No	?
Harry Potter: Quidditch World Cup ^{NA, JP, PAL} • Harry Potter: Coupe du Monde de Quidditch ^{FR} • Harry Potter: Quidditch Weltmeisterschaft ^{DE} • Harry Potter: Quidditch Copa del Mundo ^{ES} • Harry Potter: La Coppa del Mondo di Quidditch ^{IT} • Harry Potter: WK Zwerkbal ^{NL}	Magic Pockets	EA Games	October 28, 2003 (NA); November 21, 2003 (EU)	Yes	Yes	Yes	?	?
Harry Potter and the Chamber of Secrets ^{NA, PAL} • Harry Potter to Himitsu no Heya ^{JP} • Harry Potter et la Chambre des Secrets ^{FR} • Harry Potter und die Kammer des Schreckens ^{DE} • Harry Potter y la Cámara Secreta ^{ES} • Harry Potter e la Camera dei Segreti ^{IT} • Harry Potter en de Geheime Kamer ^{NL}	Eurocom	EA Games	November 15, 2002 (NA/EU)	Yes	Yes	Yes	?	?
Harry Potter and the Goblet of Fire ^{NA, PAL} • Harry Potter et la Coupe de Feu ^{FR} • Harry Potter und der Feuerkelch ^{DE} • Harry Potter y el Caliz de Fuego ^{ES} • Harry Potter e il Calice Di Fuoco ^{IT} • Harry Potter en de Vuurbeker ^{NL}	Magic Pockets	Electronic Arts	November 8, 2005 (NA); November 11, 2005 (EU)	No	Yes	Yes	?	?
Harry Potter and the Order of the Phoenix ^{NA, PAL} • Harry Potter et l'Ordre du Phénix ^{FR} • Harry Potter und der Orden des Phönix ^{DE} • Harry Potter y la Orden del Fénix ^{ES} • Harry Potter e l'Ordine della Fenice ^{IT} • Harry Potter en de Orde van de Feniks ^{NL}	Visual Impact	Electronic Arts	July 10, 2007 (NA); July 13, 2007 (EU)	No	Yes	Yes	?	?
Harry Potter and the Prisoner of Azkaban ^{NA, PAL} • Harry Potter to Azkaban no Shuujin ^{JP} • Harry Potter et le Prisonnier d'Azkaban ^{FR} • Harry Potter und der Gefangene von Askaban ^{DE} • Harry Potter y el Prisionero de Azkaban ^{ES} • Harry Potter E Il Prigioniero Di Azkaban ^{IT} • Harry Potter en de Gevangene van Azkaban ^{NL}	Griptonite Games	EA Games	May 25, 2004 (NA); May 29, 2004 (EU)	Yes	Yes	Yes	?	?
Harry Potter and the Sorcerer's Stone ^{NA} • Harry Potter to Kenja no Ishi ^{JP} • Harry Potter and the Philosopher's Stone ^{PAL} • Harry Potter a L'Ecole des Sorciers ^{FR} • Harry Potter und des Stein der Weisen ^{DE} • Harry Potter y la Piedra Filosofal ^{ES} • Harry Potter e la Pietra Filosofale ^{IT} • Harry Potter en de Steen der Wijzen ^{NL}	Griptonite Games	EA Games	November 16, 2001 (NA); November 23, 2001 (EU)	Yes	Yes	Yes	?	?
Harukanaru Toki no Naka de (Haruka: Beyond the Stream of Time)	Inis	Koei	2002 (JP)	Yes	No	No	No	?
Harvest Moon: Friends of Mineral Town ^{NA, PAL} • Bokujou Monogatari: Mineral Town no Nakama-tachi ^{JP}	TOSE	Marvelous Interactive ^{JP}, Natsume Inc. ^{NA}, Nintendo ^{AU}	April 18, 2003 (JP); November 17, 2003 (NA); March 26, 2004 (EU)	Yes	Yes	Yes	?	?
Harvest Moon: More Friends of Mineral Town ^{NA} • Bokujou Monogatari: Mineral Town no Nakama-tachi for Girl ^{JP}	TOSE	Marvelous Interactive ^{JP}, Natsume Inc. ^{NA}	December 12, 2003 (JP); July 26, 2005 (NA)	Yes	Yes	No	No	?
Hatena Satena	Hudson Soft	Hudson Soft	2001 (JP)	Yes	No	No	No	?
Heidi: The Game	Independent Arts	East Entertainment Media	2005 (PAL)	No	No	Yes	?	?
Hello! Idol Debut		TDK Core	2004 (JP)	Yes	No	No	No	?
Hello Kitty Collection: Miracle Fashion Maker	Access	Imagineer	2001 (JP)	Yes	No	No	No	?
Hello Kitty: Happy Party Pals ^{NA, PAL} • Hello Kitty: C'est la Fête! ^{FR} • Hello Kitty: Der Große Party-Spaß ^{DE} • Hello Kitty: Feliz Fiesta de Amigos ^{ES} • Hello Kitty: Happy Party ^{IT}	Webfoot Technologies	THQ	2005 (NA)	No	Yes	Yes	?	?
Hey Arnold!: The Movie	Altron	THQ	2002 (NA)	No	Yes	Yes	?	?
Hi Hi Puffy AmiYumi: Kaznapped!	Altron	D3Publisher	2005 (NA)	Yes	Yes	Yes	?	?
Higanbana	TOSE	Athena	2002 (JP)	Yes	No	No	No	?
High Heat Major League Baseball 2002	Möbius Entertainment	The 3DO Company	September 25, 2001 (NA); October 5, 2001 (PAL)	No	Yes	Yes	No	?
High Heat Major League Baseball 2003	Möbius Entertainment	The 3DO Company	2002 (NA)	Yes	Yes	No	No	?
High School Musical: Livin' the Dream	Artificial Mind and Movement	Disney Interactive Studios	2007 (NA)	No	Yes	No	No	?
Hikaru no Go	KCEJ	Konami	2002 (JP)	Yes	No	No	No	?
Hikaru no Go 2	KCEJ	Konami	2001 (JP)	Yes	No	No	No	?
Princess Blue: Hime Kishi Monogatari		Tonkin House	2002 (JP)	Yes	No	No	No	?
The Hobbit: The Prelude to the Lord of the Rings ^{NA, PAL} • Hobbit no Bouken: Lord of the Rings Hajimari no Monogatari ^{JP}	Saffire	Vivendi Universal Games	2003 (NA)	Yes	Yes	Yes	?	?
Horsez ^{NA} • Horse & Pony: My Stud Farm ^{PAL} • Alexandra Ledermann: Aventures au Galop ^{FR} • Pferd & Pony: Mein Gestüt ^{DE}	Independent Arts	Ubisoft	2006 (NA)	No	Yes	Yes	?	?
Hot Potato!	Pukka Games	BAM! Entertainment	June 28, 2001 (NA); November 2, 2001 (UK)	No	Yes	Yes	?	?
Hot Wheels: All Out	TwoFiveSix	DSI Games	September 13, 2006 (NA); November 24, 2006 (PAL)	No	Yes	Yes	?	?
Hot Wheels: Burnin' Rubber ^{NA, PAL} • Hot Wheels Advance ^{JP}	Altron	THQ	November 20, 2001 (NA); February 22, 2002 (EU); July 19, 2002 (JP)	Yes	Yes	Yes	?	?
Hot Wheels: Stunt Track Challenge	Razorback Developments	THQ	November 9, 2004 (NA); November 26, 2004 (PAL)	No	Yes	Yes	No	?
Hot Wheels: Velocity X	Saffire	THQ	November 5, 2002 (NA); December 6, 2002 (PAL)	No	Yes	Yes	?	?
Hot Wheels World Race	Climax	THQ	November 14, 2003 (NA); November 28, 2003 (PAL)	No	Yes	Yes	?	?
Hudson Best Collection Vol. 1: Bomberman Collection (Bomberman / Bomberman II)	Hudson Soft	Hudson Soft	2005 (JP)	Yes	No	No	No	?
Hudson Best Collection Vol. 2: Lode Runner Collection (Lode Runner / Championship Lode Runner)	Hudson Soft	Hudson Soft	2005 (JP)	Yes	No	No	No	?
Hudson Best Collection Vol. 3: Action Collection (Challenger / Milon's Secret Castle)	Hudson Soft	Hudson Soft	2005 (JP)	Yes	No	No	No	?
Hudson Best Collection Vol. 4: Nazotoki Collection (Nuts & Milk / Binary Land / Princess Tomato in the Salad Kingdom)	Hudson Soft	Hudson Soft	2005 (JP)	Yes	No	No	No	?
Hudson Best Collection Vol. 5: Shooting Collection (Star Force / Star Soldier / Starship Hector)	Hudson Soft	Hudson Soft	2006 (JP)	Yes	No	No	No	?
Hudson Best Collection Vol. 6: Bōkenjima Collection (Adventure Island / Adventure Island II / Adventure Island III / Adventure Island IV)	Hudson Soft	Hudson Soft	2006 (JP)	Yes	No	No	No	?
Hugo: Bukkazoom!	ITE Media	Namco	2003 (PAL)	No	No	Yes	?	?
Hugo: The Evil Mirror	ITE Media	Namco	2002 (PAL); 2005 (NA)	No	Yes	Yes	?	?
Hunter X Hunter: Minna Tomodachi Daisakusen!!		Konami	2003 (JP)	Yes	No	No	No	?
I Spy Challenger!	Black Hammer Game	Scholastic, Inc.	2002 (NA)	No	Yes	No	No	?
Ice Age	Artificial Mind and Movement	Ubi Soft	2002 (NA)	Yes	Yes	Yes	?	?
Ice Age 2: The Meltdown	Amaze Entertainment	Vivendi Universal Games	2006 (NA)	No	Yes	Yes	?	?
Ice Nine	Torus Games	BAM! Entertainment	2005 (NA)	No	Yes	Yes	?	?
The Incredible Hulk	Pocket Studios	Universal Interactive	2003 (NA)	No	Yes	Yes	?	?
The Incredibles ^{NA, PAL} • Mr. Incredible ^{JP} • Les Indestructibles ^{FR} • Die Unglaublichen ^{DE} • Los Increíbles ^{ES} • Gli Incredibili: Una "Normale" Famiglia di Supereroi ^{IT}	Helixe	THQ	November 1, 2004 (NA); November 5, 2004 (EU); November 16, 2004 (AU)	Yes	Yes	Yes	?	?
The Incredibles: Rise of the Underminer ^{NA, PAL} • Mr. Incredible: Kyouteki Underminer Toujou ^{JP} • Les Indestructibles: La Terrible Attaque du Démolisseur ^{FR} • Die Unglaublichen: Der Angriff des Tunnelgräbers ^{DE} • Los Increíbles: La Amenza del Socavador ^{ES} • Gli Incredibili: L'ascesa del Minatore ^{IT}	Helixe	THQ: JP: Sega	November 1, 2005 (NA); November 25, 2005 (EU); February 9, 2006 (JP)	Yes	Yes	Yes	?	?
Initial D: Another Stage	Sammy Studios	Sammy Studios	2002 (JP)	Yes	No	No	No	?
Inspector Gadget: Advance Mission	Magic Pockets	Light & Shadow Production; DreamCatcher Interactive	2001 (NA)	No	Yes	Yes	?	?
Inspector Gadget Racing	Bit Managers	Light & Shadow Production	2003 (PAL)	No	No	Yes	?	?
International Karate Advanced		Studio 3	2001 (PAL)	No	No	Yes	?	?
IK+ (International Karate Plus)	Ignition Entertainment	AIA	2003 (NA)	No	Yes	Yes	?	?
International Superstar Soccer ^{PAL} • Jikkyou World Soccer Pocket ^{JP}	Konami	Konami	2001 (NA)	Yes	No	Yes	?	?
International Superstar Soccer Advance ^{PAL} • Jikkyou World Soccer Pocket 2 ^{JP}	Konami	Konami	2003 (NA)	Yes	No	Yes	?	?
Inukko Club: Fukumaru no Daibouken		Jorudan	2002 (JP)	Yes	No	No	No	?
Inuyasha: Naraku no Wana! Mayoi no Mori no Shoutaijou	WinkySoft	Takara	2003 (JP)	Yes	No	No	No	?
Invader	Formula	Xicat Interactive	2002 (PAL)	No	No	Yes	?	?
The Invincible Iron Man	Torus Games	Activision	2002 (NA); 2003 (PAL)	No	Yes	Yes	?	?
Iridion 3D	Shin'en	Majesco	June 11, 2001 (NA); September 21, 2001 (EU)	No	Yes	Yes	?	?
Iridion II	Shin'en	Majesco; Vivendi Universal Games	May 12, 2003 (NA); June 20, 2003 (PAL)	No	Yes	Yes	?	?
Iron Kid		Daiwon C&A	2007 (KOR)	No	No	No	No	Yes
Isseki Hacchou: Kore 1-pon de 8 Shurui!		Konami	2002 (JP)	Yes	No	No	No	?
Island Xtreme Stunts	Silicon Dreams Studio	Electronic Arts; Lego Interactive	2002 (NA)	No	Yes	Yes	No	?
It's Mr. Pants	Rare	THQ	2005 (NA)	No	Yes	Yes	?	?
J.League Pocket	KCEO	Konami	2001 (JP)	Yes	No	No	No	?
J-League Pocket 2	Konami	Konami	2002 (JP)	Yes	No	No	No	?
J-League Winning Eleven Advance 2002	Konami	Konami	2002 (JP)	Yes	No	No	No	?
J.League Pro Soccer Club o Tsukurou! Advance	Smilebit	Sega	2002 (JP)	Yes	No	No	No	?
Jackie Chan Adventures: Legend of the Dark Hand ^{NA, PAL} • Les Aventures de Jackie Chan: La Legende de la Main Noire ^{FR}	Torus Games	Activision	2001 (NA)	No	Yes	Yes	?	?
Jaja-Kun Jr. Denshouki		Jaleco Entertainment	2004 (JP)	Yes	No	No	No	?
James Pond: Codename Robocod	Creature Labs	Valcon Games	2005 (NA)	No	Yes	Yes	?	?
Japan Pro Mahjong Renmei Kounin: Tetsuman Advance		Kaga Tech	2002 (JP)	Yes	No	No	No	?
Jazz Jackrabbit	Game Titan	Jaleco Entertainment	December 20, 2002 (NA); June 27, 2003 (EU)	No	Yes	Yes	?	?
Jet Grind Radio ^{NA} • Jet Set Radio ^{PAL}	Vicarious Visions	Sega, THQ	June 26, 2003 (NA); February 20, 2004 (EU)	No	Yes	Yes	?	?
Jimmy Neutron: Boy Genius ^{NA, PAL} • Jimmy Neutron un Garçon Génial ^{FR} • Jimmy Neutron der Mutige Erfinder ^{DE} • Jimmy Neutron: El Niño Inventor ^{ES}	HumanSoft	THQ	2001 (NA)	No	Yes	Yes	?	?
Jinsei Game Advance		Takara	2002 (JP)	Yes	No	No	No	?
Jissen Pachi-Slot Hisshouhou! Juuou Advance		Sammy Studios	2002 (JP)	Yes	No	No	No	?
Jonny Moseley Mad Trix	GFX Construction	3DO	2002 (NA)	No	Yes	Yes	?	?
JGTO Golf Master Mobile	Konami	Konami	2001 (JP)	Yes	No	No	No	?
Juka and the Monophonic Menace	Orbital Media	SouthPeak Games	November 4, 2005 (PAL); October 24, 2006 (NA)	No	Yes	Yes	?	?
Jurassic Park Institute Tour: Dinosaur Rescue		Rocket Company	2003 (JP)	Yes	No	No	No	?
Jurassic Park III: Island Attack ^{NA} • Jurassic Park III: Advanced Action ^{JP} • Jurassic Park III: Dino Attack ^{PAL}	Mobile21	Konami	2001 (NA)	Yes	Yes	Yes	Yes	?
Jurassic Park III: Park Builder^{NA, PAL} • Jurassic Park III: Kyouryuu ni ai ni Ikou! ^{JP}	Konami	Konami	2001 (NA)	Yes	Yes	Yes	?	?
Jurassic Park III: The DNA Factor^{NA, PAL} • Jurassic Park III: Ushinawareta Idenshi ^{JP}	Konami	Konami	2001 (NA)	Yes	Yes	Yes	?	?
Justice League: Injustice for All	Saffire	Midway	2002 (NA)	No	Yes	Yes	?	?
Justice League: Chronicles	Full Fat	Midway	2003 (NA)	No	Yes	No	No	?
Justice League Heroes: The Flash ^{NA, PAL} • Heros de la Ligue des Justiciers: Flash ^{FR}	WayForward	Warner Bros. Interactive Entertainment	October 17, 2006 (NA)	No	Yes	Yes	Yes	?
K-1 Pocket Grand Prix	Daft	Konami	2002 (JP)	Yes	No	No	No	?
K-1 Pocket Grand Prix 2	Daft	Konami	2002 (JP)	Yes	No	No	No	?
Kaeru B Back		Kadokawa Shoten	2002 (JP)	Yes	No	No	No	?
Kaiketsu Zorori to Mahou no Yuuenchi	Suzak	Bandai	2004 (JP)	Yes	No	No	No	?
Kamaitachi no Yoru Advance (Banshee's Last Cry)		ChunSoft	2002 (JP)	Yes	No	No	No	?
Kami no Kijutsu: Illusion of the Evil Eyes	KCEJ	Konami	2002 (JP)	Yes	No	No	No	?
Kao the Kangaroo	Titus Interactive Studio	Titus Interactive	2001 (NA)	No	Yes	Yes	?	?
Kappa no Kai-Kata: Katan Daibouken	KCEJ	Konami	2005 (JP)	Yes	No	No	No	?
Karnaaj Rally	Paragon 5	Jaleco Entertainment	2002 (NA)	No	Yes	Yes	?	?
Kawa no Nushi Tsuri 3 & 4	TOSE	Marvelous Entertainment	2006 (JP)	Yes	No	No	No	?
Kawa no Nushi Tsuri 5	TOSE	Victor Interactive Software	2002 (JP)	Yes	No	No	No	?
Kawaii Pet Game Gallery	Culture Brain	Culture Brain	2003 (JP)	Yes	No	No	No	?
Kawaii Pet Game Gallery 2	Culture Brain	Culture Brain	2004 (JP)	Yes	No	No	No	?
Kawaii Pet Shop Monogatari 3		Pacific Century Cyber Works	2002 (JP)	Yes	No	No	No	?
Keitai Denjū Telefang 2: Power Version	Natsume Co., Ltd.	Smilesoft	2002 (JP)	Yes	No	No	No	?
Keitai Denjū Telefang 2: Speed Version	Natsume Co., Ltd.	Smilesoft	2002 (JP)	Yes	No	No	No	?
Kelly Slater's Pro Surfer	HotGen	Activision	2002 (NA)	No	Yes	Yes	Yes	?
Keroro Gunsō Taiketsu! Gekisō Keronprix Daisakusen de Arimasu!!		Sunrise Interactive	2004 (JP)	Yes	No	No	No	?
Kerplunk! / Toss Across / Tip It	Gravity-I	Destination Software	2006 (NA)	No	Yes	No	No	?
Kessakusen! Ganbare Goemon 1 & 2		Konami	2005 (JP)	Yes	No	No	No	?
Kid Paddle	Mistic Software	Atari Europe	2005 (PAL)	No	No	Yes	?	?
Kidou Gekidan Haro Ichiza: Haro no Puyo Puyo		Bandai	2005 (JP)	Yes	No	No	No	?
Kidou Senshi Gundam Seed Destiny	Natsume Co., Ltd.	Bandai	2004 (JP)	Yes	No	No	No	?
Kidou Tenshi Angelic Layer		Epoch	2001 (JP)	Yes	No	No	No	?
Kid's Cards	SkyRiver Studios	Majesco	June 15, 2006 (NA)	No	Yes	No	No	?
Kill Switch	Visual Impact	Destination Software	2004 (NA)	No	Yes	Yes	?	?
Killer 3D Pool	Gravity-I	Destination Software	May 2, 2005 (NA/EU/PAL)	No	Yes	Yes	?	?
The King of Fighters EX: Neo Blood	Artoon	Marvelous Entertainment ^{JP} / Sammy Studios ^{NA, PAL}	January 1, 2002 (JP); August 23, 2002 (EU); 2002 (NA)	Yes	Yes	Yes	?	?
The King of Fighters EX2: Howling Blood	Marvelous Entertainment / Sun-Tec	Marvelous Entertainment ^{JP} / Atlus ^{NA}	January 1, 2003 (JP); June 20, 2003 (EU); December 11, 2003 (NA)	Yes	Yes	Yes	?	?
Kingdom Hearts: Chain of Memories	Jupiter	Square Enix	November 11, 2004 (JP); December 7, 2004 (NA); May 6, 2005 (EU)	Yes	Yes	Yes	Yes	?
Kinniku Banzuke: Kimeru! Kiseki no Kanzen Seiha	KCE Studios	Konami	2001 (JP)	Yes	No	No	No	?
Kinniku Banzuke: Kongou-Kun no Daibouken!	Jupiter Multimedia	Konami	2001 (JP)	Yes	No	No	No	?
Kirby: Nightmare in Dream Land ^{NA, PAL, AU} • Hoshi no Kirby: Yume no Izumi Deluxe ^{JP}	HAL Laboratory	Nintendo	October 25, 2002 (JP); December 2, 2002 (NA); September 26, 2003 (EU)	Yes	Yes	Yes	Yes	?
Kirby & the Amazing Mirror ^{NA, PAL, AU} • Hoshi no Kirby: Kagami no Daimeikyuu ^{JP}	Flagship / Dimps / HAL Laboratory / Arika	Nintendo	April 15, 2004 (JP); July 2, 2004 (EU); October 18, 2004 (NA)	Yes	Yes	Yes	Yes	?
Kiss x Kiss: Seirei Gakuen	Kamui	Bandai	2004 (JP)	Yes	No	No	No	?
Klax / Marble Madness	Frame Studios Interactive	Destination Software	2005 (NA)	No	Yes	Yes	?	?
Klonoa Heroes: Densetsu no Star Medal	Namco	Namco	December 13, 2002 (JP)	Yes	No	No	No	?
Klonoa: Empire of Dreams ^{NA, PAL} • Kaze no Klonoa: Yumemiru Teikoku ^{JP}	Namco / Now Production	Namco	July 19, 2001 (JP); September 11, 2001 (NA); March 29, 2002 (EU)	Yes	Yes	Yes	Yes	?
Klonoa 2: Dream Champ Tournament ^{NA} • Kaze no Klonoa G2: Dream Champ Tournament ^{JP}	Namco / Now Production	Namco	August 6, 2002 (JP); February 23, 2005 (NA)	Yes	Yes	No	No	?
The Koala Brothers: Outback Adventures ^{NA, PAL} • Les Freres Koalas: Aventures en Australie ^{FR}	Sirius Games	The Game Factory	2006 (NA)	No	Yes	Yes	?	?
Koinu to Issho! Aijou Monogatari	Culture Brain	Culture Brain	2003 (JP)	Yes	No	No	No	?
Koinu to Issho! 2	Culture Brain	Culture Brain	2004 (JP)	Yes	No	No	No	?
Koinu-Chan no Hajimete no Osanpo: Koino no Kokoro Ikusei Game	TDK Mediactive	TDK Mediactive	2003 (JP)	Yes	No	No	No	?
Konami Collector's Series: Arcade Advanced ^{NA} • Konami Arcade Game Collection ^{JP} • Konami Collector's Series: Arcade Classics ^{PAL}	Konami	Konami	March 18, 2002 (NA); May 2, 2002 (JP); June 21, 2002 (PAL)	Yes	Yes	Yes	?	?
Konchuu Monster: Battle Master	Culture Brain	Culture Brain	2005 (JP)	Yes	No	No	No	?
Konchuu Monster: Battle Stadium	Culture Brain	Culture Brain	2005 (JP)	Yes	No	No	No	?
Kouchuu Ouja Mushiking: Greatest Champion e no Michi (Kouchuu Ouja: Mushi King)	Mushiking Team	Sega	June 23, 2005 (JP)	Yes	No	No	No	?
Konchuu no Mori no Daibouken	Culture Brain	Culture Brain	August 11, 2005 (JP)	Yes	No	No	No	?
Konami Krazy Racers^{NA, PAL} • Konami Wai Wai Racing Advance ^{JP}	KCEK	Konami	March 21, 2001 (JP); June 11, 2001 (NA); June 22, 2001 (PAL)	Yes	Yes	Yes	?	?
Kong: The Animated Series	Planet Interactive	BAM! Entertainment	2002 (NA); 2003 (PAL)	No	Yes	Yes	?	?
Kong: King of Atlantis	SkyRiver Studios	Majesco	2005 (NA)	No	Yes	Yes	?	?
Kong: The 8th Wonder of the World ^{NA} • King Kong: The Official Game of the Movie ^{PAL}	Ubisoft	Ubisoft	2005 (NA)	No	Yes	Yes	?	?
Konjiki no Gash Bell!!: Card Battle	Banpresto	Banpresto	2005 (JP)	Yes	No	No	No	?
Konjiki no Gash Bell!!: Makai no Bookmark	Banpresto	Banpresto	2004 (JP)	Yes	No	No	No	?
Konjiki no Gash Bell!!: Yuujou no Zakeru ^{JP} • Zatch Bell!: Electric Arena ^{NA}	Eighting	Banpresto	2003 (NA)	Yes	Yes	No	No	?
Konjiki no Gash Bell!!: Yuujou no Zakeru 2	Dimps	Banpresto	2004 (JP)	Yes	No	No	No	?
Konjiki no Gash Bell: Yuujou no Zakeru Dream Tag Tournament	Dimps	Banpresto	2005 (JP)	Yes	No	No	No	?
Koro Koro Puzzle Happy Panechu!	Mobile21, Nintendo R&D2	Nintendo	March 8, 2002 (JP)	Yes	No	No	No	?
Kotoba no Puzzle: Mojipittan Advance		Namco	2003 (JP)	Yes	No	No	No	?
Koukou Juken Advance Series: Eigo Koubunhen 26 Units Shuuroku	NDcube	Keynet	2001 (JP)	Yes	No	No	No	?
Koukou Juken Advance Series: Eijukugohen 650 Phrases Shuuroku	NDcube	Keynet	2001 (JP)	Yes	No	No	No	?
Koukou Juken Advance Series: Eitangohen 2000 Words Shuuroku	NDcube	Keynet	2001 (JP)	Yes	No	No	No	?
Kunio-kun Nekketsu Collection 1	Million Co., Ltd.	Atlus	2005 (JP)	Yes	No	No	No	?
Kunio-kun Nekketsu Collection 2	Million Co., Ltd.	Atlus	2005 (JP)	Yes	No	No	No	?
Kunio-kun Nekketsu Collection 3	Million Co., Ltd.	Atlus	2006 (JP)	Yes	No	No	No	?
Kurohige no Golf Shiyouyo	Inti Creates	Tomy Corporation	2002 (JP)	Yes	No	No	No	?
Kurohige no Kurutto Jintori	Happy-Smile	Tomy Corporation	2002 (JP)	Yes	No	No	No	?
Kuru Kuru Kururin	Eighting	Nintendo	March 21, 2001 (JP); June 22, 2001 (EU)	Yes	No	Yes	?	?
Kururin Paradise	Eighting	Nintendo	December 6, 2002 (JP)	Yes	No	No	No	?
Lady Sia	RFX Interactive	TDK Mediactive	September 27, 2001 (NA); October 19, 2001 (EU)	No	Yes	Yes	?	?
The Land Before Time ^{NA, PAL} • Le Petit Dinosaure ^{FR} • In Einem Land Vor Unserer Zeit ^{DE} • Alla Ricerca della Valle Incantata ^{IT}	Full Fat	Conspiracy Entertainment	2002 (NA)	No	Yes	Yes	?	?
The Land Before Time: Into the Mysterious Beyond ^{NA, PAL} • La Vallée du Petit Dinosaure: Aventures vers l'inconnu ^{FR}	Sirius Games	The Game Factory	2006 (NA)	No	Yes	Yes	?	?
Legend of Dynamic Goushouden: Houkai no Rondo	Will	Banpresto	2003 (JP)	Yes	No	No	No	?
The Legend of Spyro: A New Beginning	Krome Studios	Vivendi Universal Games	October 10, 2006 (NA)	No	Yes	Yes	?	?
The Legend of Spyro: The Eternal Night	Amaze Entertainment	Vivendi Games	October 3, 2007 (NA)	No	Yes	Yes	?	?
The Legend of Zelda: A Link to the Past and Four Swords^{NA, PAL} • Zelda no Densetsu: Kamigami no Triforce & Yotsu no Tsurugi ^{JP}	Nintendo	Nintendo	December 3, 2002 (NA); March 14, 2003 (JP); March 28, 2003 (EU)	Yes	Yes	Yes	?	?
The Legend of Zelda: The Minish Cap^{NA, PAL} • Zeruda no Densetsu Fushigi no Bōshi ^{JP}	Capcom	Nintendo	November 4, 2004 (JP); November 12, 2004 (EU); January 10, 2005 (NA)	Yes	Yes	Yes	Yes	?
Legends of Wrestling II	Powerhead Games	Acclaim Entertainment	November 26, 2002 (NA); December 6, 2002 (PAL)	No	Yes	Yes	?	?
Legendz: Yomigaeru Shiren no Shima^{JP} • Legendz: Buhwarhaneun Siryeonui Seom ^{KR}	Bec	Bandai	2004 (NA)	Yes	No	No	No	Yes
Legendz: Sign of Nekuromu (Legendz: Sign of Necrom)		Bandai	2005 (JP)	Yes	No	No	No	?
Lego Bionicle	Saffire	Lego Software	2001 (NA)	No	Yes	Yes	?	?
Lego Island 2: The Brickster's Revenge	Silicon Dreams	Lego Software	2001 (NA)	No	Yes	Yes	?	?
Lego Knights' Kingdom	Razorback Developments	THQ	2004 (NA)	No	Yes	Yes	?	?
Lego Racers 2	Pocket Studios	Lego Software	2001 (NA)	No	Yes	Yes	?	?
Lego Star Wars: The Video Game^{NA, PAL, JP} • Lego Star Wars: Das Videospiel ^{DE}	Griptonite Games	Eidos Interactive, Giant Interactive Entertainment	2005 (NA)	Yes	Yes	Yes	?	?
Lego Star Wars II: The Original Trilogy ^{NA, PAL} • LEGO Star Wars II: La Trilogie Originale ^{FR} • Lego Star Wars II: Die Klassische Trilogie ^{DE} • Lego Star Wars II: La Trilogía Original ^{ES} • Lego Star Wars II: La Trilogia Classica ^{IT}	Amaze Entertainment	LucasArts	2006 (NA)	No	Yes	Yes	?	?
Lemony Snicket's A Series of Unfortunate Events ^{NA, PAL} • Les Désastreuses aventures des orphelins Baudelaire d'après Lemony Snicket ^{FR} • Lemony Snicket: Räetselhafte Ereignisse ^{DE} • Una Serie De Catastróficas Desdichas de Lemony Snicket ^{ES} • Lemony Snicket: Una Serie di Sfortunati Eventi ^{IT}	Griptonite Games	Activision	2004 (NA)	No	Yes	Yes	?	?
Let's Ride! Dreamer ^{NA} • Horse & Pony: Let's Ride 2 ^{PAL} • Pippa Funnell 2 ^{FR} • Pferd & Pony: Lass Uns Reiten 2 ^{DE} • Paard & Pony: Paard in Galop ^{NL}	Kritzelkratz	THQ	2005 (PAL); 2006 (NA)	No	Yes	Yes	?	?
Let's Ride! Friends Forever ^{NA} • Horse & Pony: Best Friends - My Horse ^{PAL} • Pferd & Pony: Best Friends - Mein Pferd ^{DE}	dtp Young Entertainment AG	THQ	2007 (NA)	No	Yes	Yes	No	?
Let's Ride! Sunshine Stables ^{NA} • Pippa Funnell: Stable Adventure ^{PAL} • Alexandra Ledermann ^{FR} • Pferd & Pony: Mein Pferdehof ^{DE} • Paard & Pony: Mijn Manege ^{NL}	Independent Arts	THQ	2005 (NA)	No	Yes	Yes	?	?
Licca-chan no Oshare Nikki		Marvelous Entertainment	2004 (JP)	Yes	No	No	No	?
Lilliput Oukoku: Lillimoni to Issho-puni!	Alpha Unit	Sega	2004 (JP)	Yes	No	No	No	?
Little Buster Q	Amedio	Tomy Corporation	2002 (JP)	Yes	No	No	No	?
Little League Baseball 2002	Handheld Games	NewKidCo	2002 (NA)	No	Yes	No	No	?
Little Patissier: Cake no Oshiro		MTO	2004 (JP)	Yes	No	No	No	?
Lizzie McGuire: On the Go ^{NA} • Lizzie McGuire ^{PAL}	Digital Eclipse	Disney Interactive, THQ	2003 (NA)	No	Yes	Yes	?	?
Lizzie McGuire 2: Lizzie Diaries	Climax	Disney Interactive, THQ	2004 (NA)	No	Yes	No	No	?
Lizzie McGuire 3: Homecoming Havoc	Climax	Buena Vista Interactive, THQ	2005 (NA)	No	Yes	No	No	?
Lode Runner		Success	2003 (JP)	Yes	No	No	No	?
Looney Tunes Double Pack (Dizzy Driving / Acme Antics)	WayForward	Majesco	2005 (NA); 2006 (PAL)	No	Yes	Yes	?	?
Looney Tunes: Back in Action ^{NA, PAL} • Les Looney Tunes: Passent a L'Action ^{FR}	Warthog	Electronic Arts	2003 (NA)	No	Yes	Yes	?	?
The Lord of the Rings: The Fellowship of the Ring ^{NA, PAL} • Le Seigneur Des Anneaux: La Communaute De L'anneau ^{FR} • Der Herr der Ringe: Die Gefährten ^{DE} • El Señor de los Anillos: La Comunidad del Anillo ^{ES} • Il Signore degli Anelli: La Compagnia Dell'Anello ^{IT}	Pocket Studios	Black Label Games	2002 (NA)	No	Yes	Yes	Yes	?
The Lord of the Rings: The Two Towers ^{NA, PAL} • The Lord of the Rings: Futatsu no Tou ^{JP} • Le Seigneur des Anneaux: Les Deux Tours ^{FR} • Der Herr der Ringe: Die Zwei Türme ^{DE} • El Señor de los Anillos: Las Dos Torres ^{ES} • Il Signore degli Anelli: Le Due Torri ^{IT}	Griptonite Games	Electronic Arts	2002 (NA)	Yes	Yes	Yes	?	?
The Lord of the Rings: The Return of the King ^{NA, PAL} • The Lord of the Rings: Ou no Kikan ^{JP} • Le Seigneur des Anneaux: Le Retour du Roi ^{FR} • Der Herr der Ringe: Die Rückkehr des Königs ^{DE} • El Señor de los Anillos: El Retorno Del Ray ^{ES} • Il Signore degli Anelli: Il Ritorno del Re ^{IT}	Griptonite Games	EA Games	2003 (NA)	Yes	Yes	Yes	?	?
The Lord of the Rings: The Third Age ^{NA, PAL} • The Lord of the Rings: Nakatsukuni Daisanki ^{JP} • Le Seigneur des Anneaux: Le Tiers Age ^{FR} • Der Herr der Ringe: Das Dritte Zeitalter ^{DE} • El Señor de los Anillos: La Tercera Edad ^{ES} • Il Signore degli Anelli: La Terza Era ^{IT}	Griptonite Games	EA Games	2004 (NA)	Yes	Yes	Yes	?	?
The Lost Vikings	Mass Media	Blizzard Entertainment	March 24, 2003 (NA)	No	Yes	Yes	?	?
Love Hina Advance: Shukufuku no Kane wa Harukana	Marvelous Entertainment	Marvelous Entertainment	2001 (JP)	Yes	No	No	No	?
Lucky Luke: Wanted!	WizardSoft	Infogrames	2001 (PAL)	No	No	Yes	?	?
Lufia: The Ruins of Lore ^{NA} • Estopolis Densetsu: Chinmoku no Iseki ^{JP}	Atelier Double	Taito ^{JP} Atlus ^{NA}	March 8, 2002 (JP); May 6, 2003 (NA)	Yes	Yes	No	No	?
Lunar Legend	Japan Art Media	Media Rings ^{JP} Ubisoft ^{NA}	April 12, 2002 (JP); December 10, 2002 (NA)	Yes	Yes	No	No	?
M&M's Blast!	Pipe Dream Interactive	Majesco	December 1, 2001 (NA)	No	Yes	No	No	?
M&M's Break' Em	Frame Studios Interactive	DSI Games	February 6, 2007 (NA)	No	Yes	No	No	?
Madagascar	Vicarious Visions	Activision	2005 (NA)	Yes	Yes	Yes	?	?
Madagascar: Operation Penguin ^{NA, PAL} • Madagascar: Operation Pingouins ^{FR} • Madagascar: Operation Pinguin ^{DE} • Madagascar: Operación Pingüino ^{ES} • Madagascar: Operazione Pinguino ^{IT}	Vicarious Visions	Activision	2005 (NA)	No	Yes	Yes	?	?
Madden NFL 2002	EA Tiburon / Budcat Creations	EA Sports	2001 (NA)	No	Yes	No	No	?
Madden NFL 2003	EA Tiburon / Budcat Creations	EA Sports	2002 (NA)	No	Yes	No	No	?
Madden NFL 2004	EA Tiburon / Budcat Creations	EA Sports	2003 (NA)	No	Yes	No	No	?
Madden NFL 2005	Exient Entertainment	EA Sports	2004 (NA)	No	Yes	No	No	?
Madden NFL 06	Exient Entertainment	EA Sports	2005 (NA)	No	Yes	No	No	?
Madden NFL 07	Exient Entertainment	EA Sports	2006 (NA)	No	Yes	No	No	?
Magi Nation	Interactive Imagination	Epoch	2002 (JP)	Yes	No	No	No	?
Magical Houshin	Koei	Koei	2002 (JP)	Yes	No	No	No	?
Magical Vacation	Brownie Brown	Nintendo	December 7, 2001 (JP)	Yes	No	No	No	?
Mahjong Keiji (Mahjong Detective)		Hudson Soft	2001 (JP)	Yes	No	No	No	?
Mahou Sensei Negima! Private Lesson: Dame Desu Toshokan		Marvelous Entertainment	2005 (JP)	Yes	No	No	No	?
Mahou Sensei Negima! Private Lesson 2: Ojama Shimasu Parasite de Chu		Marvelous Entertainment	2006 (JP)	Yes	No	No	No	?
Mail de Cute	Konami	Konami	2002 (JP)	Yes	No	No	No	?
Majokko Cream-Chan Gokko Series 1: Wan Nyon Idol Gakuen	Culture Brain	Culture Brain	2003 (JP)	Yes	No	No	No	?
Majjokko Cream-Chan no Gokko Series 2: Kisekae Angel (Kisekae Angel)	Culture Brain	Culture Brain	2004 (JP)	Yes	No	No	No	?
Major League Baseball 2K7	Skyworks Technologies	2K Sports	2007 (NA)	No	Yes	No	No	?
Manic Miner	Jester Interactive	Jester Interactive	2002 (PAL)	No	No	Yes	?	?
Manga-ka Debut Monogatari: Akogare! Manga Ka Ikusei Game!		TDK Core	2002 (JP)	Yes	No	No	No	?
March of the Penguins ^{NA, PAL} • Die Reise der Pinguine ^{DE}	SkyRiver Studios	DSI Games	November 20, 2006 (NA)	No	Yes	Yes	?	?
Mar Heaven: Knockin' on Heaven's Door	Alpha Unit	Konami	2005 (JP)	Yes	No	No	No	?
Marie, Elie & Anis no Atelier: Soyokaze kara no Dengon		Banpresto	2003 (JP)	Yes	No	No	No	?
Mario & Luigi: Superstar Saga ^{NA, PAL} • Mario & Luigi RPG ^{JP}	AlphaDream	Nintendo	November 17, 2003 (NA); November 21, 2003 (EU/JP)	Yes	Yes	Yes	Yes	?
Mario Golf: Advance Tour ^{NA, PAL} • Mario Golf: GBA Tour ^{JP}	Camelot Software Planning	Nintendo	April 22, 2004 (JP); June 22, 2004 (NA); September 17, 2004 (EU)	Yes	Yes	Yes	Yes	?
Mario Kart: Super Circuit ^{NA, PAL} • Mario Kart Advance ^{JP}	Intelligent Systems	Nintendo	July 21, 2001 (JP); August 26, 2001 (NA); September 14, 2001 (EU)	Yes	Yes	Yes	Yes	?
Mario Party Advance	Hudson Soft / A.I	Nintendo	January 13, 2005 (JP); March 28, 2005 (NA); June 10, 2005 (EU)	Yes	Yes	Yes	Yes	?
Mario Pinball Land ^{NA} • Super Mario Ball ^{PAL, JP}	Fuse Games	Nintendo	August 26, 2004 (JP); October 4, 2004 (NA); November 26, 2004 (EU)	Yes	Yes	Yes	Yes	?
Mario Tennis: Power Tour ^{NA} • Mario Tennis Advance ^{JP} • Mario Power Tennis ^{PAL}	Camelot Software Planning	Nintendo	September 13, 2005 (JP); November 18, 2005 (EU); December 5, 2005 (NA)	Yes	Yes	Yes	Yes	?
Mario vs. Donkey Kong	Nintendo Software Technology	Nintendo	May 24, 2004 (NA); June 10, 2004 (JP); November 19, 2004 (EU)	Yes	Yes	Yes	Yes	?
Marvel: Ultimate Alliance ^{NA, PAL} • Marvel: La Grande Alleanza ^{IT}	Barking Lizards	Activision	2006 (NA)	No	Yes	Yes	Yes	?
Mary-Kate and Ashley: Girls Night Out	Powerhead Games	Acclaim	2002 (NA)	No	Yes	Yes	No	?
Mary-Kate and Ashley: Sweet 16 – Licensed to Drive	Powerhead Games	Acclaim Entertainment	2002 (NA)	No	Yes	Yes	?	?
Masters of the Universe - He-man Power of Grayskull	Taniko	TDK Mediactive	2002 (NA)	No	Yes	No	No	?
Mat Hoffman's Pro BMX	HotGen	Activision	2001 (NA)	No	Yes	Yes	?	?
Mat Hoffman's Pro BMX 2	HotGen	Activision	2002 (NA)	No	Yes	Yes	?	?
Matantei Loki Ragnarok: Gensou no Labyrinth		J-Wing	2003 (JP)	Yes	No	No	No	?
Matchbox Cross Town Heroes	Magellan Interactive	THQ	2002 (NA)	No	Yes	Yes	?	?
Matchbox Missions: Air, Land and Sea Rescue / Emergency Response	Gravity-I	DSI Games	2006 (NA)	No	Yes	Yes	?	?
Math Patrol: The Kleptoid Threat	GXB Interactive	Tomy Corporation	November 4, 2007 (NA)	No	Yes	No	No	?
Max Payne ^{NA} • Max Payne Advance ^{PAL}	Möbius Entertainment	Rockstar Games	2003 (NA)	No	Yes	Yes	?	?
Maya the Bee: Sweet Gold • Die Biene Maja: Süßes Gold ^{DE}	Shin'en	Midway	2005 (PAL)	No	No	Yes	?	?
Maya the Bee: The Great Adventure ^{PAL} • Maya L'Abeille: La Grande Aventure ^{FR} • Die Biene Maja: Das Grosse Abenteuer ^{DE} • La Abeja Maya: Nuevas Aventuras ^{ES} • L'Ape Maia: La Grande Avventura ^{IT}	Shin'en	Acclaim Entertainment	2002 (PAL)	No	No	Yes	?	?
Mazes of Fate	Sabarasa Entertainment	O3 Entertainment	2006 (NA)	No	Yes	No	No	?
Mech Platoon • Kikaika Gunta: Mech Platoon ^{JP}	Will	Kemco	November 28, 2001 (EU); November 30, 2001 (JP); December 20, 2001 (NA)	Yes	Yes	Yes	?	?
Medabots AX: Metabee Version • Medarot G: Kabuto Version ^{JP}	Natsume Co., Ltd.	Natsume Inc.	2002 (PAL/JP); 2003 (NA)	Yes	Yes	Yes	?	?
Medabots AX: Rokusho Version • Medarot G: Kuwagata Version ^{JP}	Natsume Co., Ltd.	Natsume Inc.	2002 (PAL/JP); 2003 (NA)	Yes	Yes	Yes	?	?
Medal of Honor: Infiltrator ^{NA, PAL} • Medal of Honor Advance ^{JP} • Medal of Honor: Espionnage ^{FR}	Netherock Ltd.	EA Games	2003 (NA)	Yes	Yes	Yes	?	?
Medal of Honor: Underground	Rebellion Developments	Destination Software	2002 (NA); 2003 (PAL)	No	Yes	Yes	?	?
Medarot Navi Kabuto Version	Natsume Co., Ltd.	Imagineer	2001 (JP)	Yes	No	No	No	?
Medarot Navi Kuwagata Version	Natsume Co., Ltd.	Imagineer	2001 (JP)	Yes	No	No	No	?
Medabots: Metabee Version • Medarot 2 Core: Kabuto Version ^{JP}	Natsume Co., Ltd.	Natsume Inc.	2002; 2003 (NA)	Yes	Yes	Yes	No	?
Medabots: Rokusho Version • Medarot 2 Core: Kuwagata Version ^{JP}	Natsume Co., Ltd.	Natsume Inc.	2002; 2003 (NA)	Yes	Yes	Yes	No	?
Meet the Robinsons ^{NA, PAL} • Bienvenue chez les Robinson ^{FR} • Triff Die Robinsons ^{DE} • Descubriendo a los Robinsons ^{ES} • I Robinson: Una Famiglia Spaziale ^{IT}	Climax	Disney Interactive Studios	March 27, 2007 (NA)	No	Yes	Yes	?	?
Mega Man & Bass ^{NA, PAL} • Rockman & Forte ^{JP}	Capcom	Capcom	August 10, 2002 (JP); March 10, 2003 (NA); March 21, 2003 (EU)	Yes	Yes	Yes	?	?
Mega Man Battle Chip Challenge ^{NA, PAL} • Rockman EXE Battle Chip GP ^{JP}	Capcom	Capcom	August 8, 2003 (JP); March 3, 2004 (NA); March 19, 2004 (PAL)	Yes	Yes	Yes	?	?
Mega Man Battle Network ^{NA, PAL} • Battle Network Rockman EX ^{JP}	Capcom	Capcom	March 21, 2001 (JP); October 31, 2001 (NA); November 30, 2001 (PAL)	Yes	Yes	Yes	?	?
Mega Man Battle Network 2 ^{NA, PAL} • Battle Network Rockman EXE 2 ^{JP}	Capcom	Capcom	December 14, 2001 (JP); June 17, 2002 (NA); October 18, 2002 (PAL)	Yes	Yes	Yes	?	?
Mega Man Battle Network 3: Blue ^{NA, PAL} • Battle Network Rockman EXE 3 Black ^{JP}	Capcom	Capcom	March 28, 2003 (JP); June 24, 2003 (NA); July 4, 2003 (EU)	Yes	Yes	Yes	?	?
Mega Man Battle Network 3: White ^{NA, PAL} • Battle Network Rockman EXE 3 ^{JP}	Capcom	Capcom	December 6, 2002 (JP); June 24, 2003 (NA); July 4, 2003 (EU)	Yes	Yes	Yes	?	?
Mega Man Battle Network 4: Blue Moon ^{NA, PAL} • Rockman EXE 4 Tournament Blue Moon ^{JP}	Capcom	Capcom	December 12, 2003 (JP); June 29, 2004 (NA); September 3, 2004 (EU)	Yes	Yes	Yes	?	?
Mega Man Battle Network 4: Red Sun ^{NA, PAL} • Rockman EXE 4 Tournament Red Sun ^{JP}	Capcom	Capcom	December 12, 2003 (JP); June 29, 2004 (NA); September 3, 2004 (EU)	Yes	Yes	Yes	?	?
Mega Man Battle Network 5: Team Protoman ^{NA, PAL} • Rockman EXE 5 Team of Blues ^{JP}	Capcom	Capcom	December 9, 2004 (JP); June 10, 2005 (EU); June 21, 2005 (NA)	Yes	Yes	Yes	?	?
Mega Man Battle Network 5: Team Colonel ^{NA, PAL} • Rockman EXE 5 Team of Colonel ^{JP}	Capcom	Capcom	December 9, 2004 (JP); June 10, 2005 (EU); June 21, 2005 (NA)	Yes	Yes	Yes	?	?
Mega Man Battle Network 6: Cybeast Falzar ^{NA, PAL} • Rockman EXE 6 Dennōjū Falzer ^{JP}	Capcom	Capcom	November 23, 2005 (JP); June 13, 2006 (NA); June 16, 2006 (PAL)	Yes	Yes	Yes	?	?
Mega Man Battle Network 6: Cybeast Gregar ^{NA, PAL} • Rockman EXE 6 Dennōjū Glaga ^{JP}	Capcom	Capcom	November 23, 2005 (JP); June 13, 2006 (NA); June 16, 2006 (PAL)	Yes	Yes	Yes	?	?
Mega Man Zero ^{NA, PAL} • Rockman Zero ^{JP}	Inti Creates	Capcom	April 24, 2002 (JP); September 9, 2002 (NA); September 27, 2002 (EU)	Yes	Yes	Yes	?	?
Mega Man Zero 2 ^{NA, PAL} • Rockman Zero 2 ^{JP}	Inti Creates	Capcom	May 5, 2003 (JP); October 14, 2003 (NA); October 31, 2004 (EU)	Yes	Yes	Yes	?	?
Mega Man Zero 3 ^{NA, PAL} • Rockman Zero 3 ^{JP}	Inti Creates	Capcom	April 23, 2004 (JP); September 23, 2004 (EU); October 5, 2004 (NA)	Yes	Yes	Yes	Yes	?
Mega Man Zero 4 ^{NA, PAL} • Rockman Zero 4 ^{JP}	Inti Creates	Capcom	April 21, 2005 (JP); September 16, 2005 (EU); October 4, 2005 (NA)	Yes	Yes	Yes	Yes	?
Meitantei Conan: Akatsuki no Monument		Banpresto	2005 (JP)	Yes	No	No	No	?
Meitantei Conan: Nerawareta Tantei	Fortyfive	Banpresto	2003 (JP)	Yes	No	No	No	?
Men in Black: The Series	David A. Palmer Productions	Crave	2001 (NA)	No	Yes	Yes	?	?
Mermaid Melody: Pichi Pichi Pitch	Konami	Konami	2003 (JP)	Yes	No	No	No	?
Mermaid Melody: Pichi Pichi Pitch - Pichi Pichi Party	Konami	Konami	2003 (JP)	Yes	No	No	No	?
Mermaid Melody: Pichi Pichi Pitch - Pichi Pichitto Live Start	Konami	Konami	2004 (JP)	Yes	No	No	No	?
Metal Max 2 Kai		Now Production	2003 (JP)	Yes	No	No	No	?
Metal Slug Advance	Noise Factory	SNK Playmore	November 12, 2004 (EU); November 18, 2004 (JP); December 2, 2004 (NA)	Yes	Yes	Yes	?	?
Metalgun Slinger	Open Sesame	Atmark	2002 (JP)	Yes	No	No	No	?
Metroid Fusion	Nintendo	Nintendo	November 17, 2002 (NA); November 22, 2002 (EU); February 14, 2003 (JP)	Yes	Yes	Yes	Yes	?
Metroid: Zero Mission	Nintendo	Nintendo	February 9, 2004 (NA); April 8, 2004 (EU); May 27, 2004 (JP)	Yes	Yes	Yes	Yes	?
Mezase! Koushien		Tasuke	2005 (JP)	Yes	No	No	No	?
Micro Machines	Paragon 5	Infogrames	2003 (PAL)	No	No	Yes	?	?
Midnight Club: Street Racing	Rebellion Developments	Destination Software	November 9, 2001 (NA); February 8, 2002 (PAL)	No	Yes	Yes	?	?
Midway's Greatest Arcade Hits	Midway	Midway	November 19, 2001 (NA); November 30, 2001 (EU)	No	Yes	Yes	?	?
Mighty Beanz Pocket Puzzles	Radius9	Majesco	2004 (NA)	No	Yes	No	No	?
Mike Tyson Boxing	Virtucraft	Ubisoft	2002 (NA)	No	Yes	Yes	?	?
Millipede / Super Breakout / Lunar Lander	Gravity-I	DSI Games	2005 (NA)	No	Yes	Yes	?	?
Minami no Umi no Odyssey		Global A	2002 (JP)	Yes	No	No	No	?
Mini Moni: Mika no Happy Morning Chatty		Shogakukan	2002 (JP)	Yes	No	No	No	?
Mini Moni: Onegai Ohoshi-sama!		Konami	December 12, 2002 (JP)	Yes	No	No	No	?
Minna no Ouji-Sama	Konami	Konami	2003 (JP)	Yes	No	No	No	?
Minna no Soft Series: Hyokkori Hyoutan Shima	MTO	MTO	2003 (JP)	Yes	No	No	No	?
Minna no Soft Series: Happy Trump 20	Kouyousha	Success	2005 (JP)	Yes	No	No	No	?
Minna no Soft Series: Minna no Mahjong	MTO	MTO	2003 (JP)	Yes	No	No	No	?
Minna no Soft Series: Minna no Shogi	Arioka	Success	2004 (JP)	Yes	No	No	No	?
Minna no Soft Series: Shanghai	Access	Success	2003 (JP)	Yes	No	No	No	?
Minna no Soft Series: Tetris Advance	Access	Success, THQ	2003 (JP)	Yes	No	No	No	?
Minority Report: Everybody Runs	Torus Games	Activision	2002 (NA)	No	Yes	Yes	?	?
Miracle! Panzou: 7-tsu no Hoshi no Uchuu Kaizoku		Atlus	2005 (JP)	Yes	No	No	No	?
Mission: Impossible – Operation Surma	M4 Limited	Atari	2003 (NA)	No	Yes	Yes	?	?
MLB Slugfest 2004	Handheld Games	Midway	2003 (NA)	No	Yes	No	No	?
Mobile Pro Yakyuu: Kantoku no Saihai	Mobile21	Konami	2001 (JP)	Yes	No	No	No	?
Mobile Suit Gundam Seed: Tomo to Kimi to Koko de • Kidou Senshi Gundam Seed: Tomo to Kimi to Koko de ^{JP}	Natsume Co., Ltd.	Bandai	2004 (JP)	Yes	No	No	No	?
Mobile Suit Gundam Seed: Battle Assault	Natsume Co., Ltd.	Bandai	2004 (NA)	No	Yes	No	No	?
Momotarou Matsuri (Momotaro Festival)	Hudson	Hudson	2001 (JP)	Yes	No	No	No	?
Momotarou Dentetsu G: Gold Deck o Tsukure!		Hudson	2005 (JP)	Yes	No	No	No	?
Monopoly	Destination Software	DSI Games	2004 (NA)	No	Yes	Yes	?	?
Monster! Bass Fishing	Ignition Entertainment	AIA USA	2004 (NA)	No	Yes	Yes	?	?
Monster Force	Digital Eclipse	Universal Interactive	2002 (NA)	No	Yes	Yes	?	?
Monster Gate	KCE Studios	Konami	2002 (JP)	Yes	No	No	No	?
Monster Gate 2: Dai Inaru Dungeon (Monster Gate: Ooinaru Dungeon - Fuuin no Orb)	KCE Studios	Konami	2003 (JP)	Yes	No	No	No	?
Monster Guardians	Konami	Konami	2001 (JP)	Yes	No	No	No	?
Monster House	Artificial Mind and Movement	THQ	2006 (NA)	No	Yes	Yes	?	?
Monster Jam: Maximum Destruction	Unique Development Studios	Ubisoft	2002 (NA)	No	Yes	Yes	?	?
Monster Maker 4: Flash Card		Success	2002 (JP)	Yes	No	No	No	?
Monster Maker 4: Killer Dice		Success	2002 (JP)	Yes	No	No	No	?
Monster Rancher Advance ^{NA} • Monster Farm Advance ^{JP}	Tecmo	Tecmo	November 29, 2001 (NA); December 7, 2001 (JP)	Yes	Yes	No	?	?
Monster Rancher Advance 2 ^{NA} • Monster Farm Advance 2 ^{JP}	Tecmo	Tecmo	October 25, 2002 (JP); November 18, 2002 (NA)	Yes	Yes	No	?	?
Monster Summoner		Ertain	2004 (JP)	Yes	No	No	No	?
Monster Truck Madness	Tantalus	THQ	2003 (NA)	No	Yes	Yes	No	?
Monster Trucks	Skyworks Technologies	Majesco	2004 (NA)	No	Yes	Yes	?	?
Monster Trucks Mayhem	Apex Designs	DSI Games	2006 (NA)	No	Yes	Yes	?	?
Monsters, Inc. ^{NA, JP, PAL} • Monstres & Cie ^{FR} • Die Monster AG ^{DE} • Monstruos, S.A. ^{ES} • Monsters & Co. ^{IT}	Natsume Co., Ltd.	THQ	October 26, 2001 (NA); February 1, 2002 (EU)	Yes	Yes	Yes	?	?
Moorhuhn 3: ...Es Gibt Huhn! ^{DE} • Crazy Chicken 3: The Chicken Chase ^{PAL}	Sproing	Ubisoft	2002 (PAL)	No	No	Yes	?	?
Moero!! Jaleco Collection	Jaleco Entertainment	Jaleco Entertainment	2004 (JP)	Yes	No	No	No	?
Morita Shogi Advance	Hudson	Hudson	2001 (JP)	Yes	No	No	No	?
The Morning Adventure	Bit Managers	Virtual Toys	2003 (PAL)	No	No	Yes	?	?
Mortal Kombat Advance	Virtucraft	Midway	2002 (NA)	No	Yes	Yes	?	?
Mortal Kombat: Deadly Alliance	Midway	Midway	2002 (NA)	No	Yes	Yes	?	?
Mortal Kombat: Tournament Edition	Midway	Midway	2003 (NA)	No	Yes	No	No	?
Mother 1 + 2	Brownie Brown / HAL Laboratory	Nintendo	June 23, 2003 (JP)	Yes	No	No	No	?
Mother 3	Brownie Brown / HAL Laboratory / Nintendo	Nintendo	April 20, 2006 (JP)	Yes	No	No	No	?
MotoGP: Ultimate Racing Technology	Visual Impact	THQ	2002 (NA)	Yes	Yes	Yes	?	?
Moto Racer Advance	Adeline Software International	Ubisoft	October 4, 2002 (EU); December 4, 2002 (NA)	No	Yes	Yes	?	?
Motocross Maniacs Advance ^{NA} • Maniac Racers Advance ^{PAL}	Konami	Konami	March 21, 2002 (NA); May 2, 2002 (JP); May 31, 2002 (FR)	Yes	Yes	Yes	?	?
Mouse Trap / Operation / Simon	Gravity-I	Destination Software	2005 (NA)	No	Yes	No	No	?
Mr. Driller 2	Namco	Namco	March 21, 2001 (JP); January 30, 2004 (EU); April 10, 2005 (NA)	Yes	Yes	Yes	?	?
Mr. Driller Ace: Fushigi na Pacteria		Namco	August 23, 2002 (JP)	Yes	No	No	No	?
Mr. Nutz	Dream On	Infogrames	2001 (PAL)	No	No	Yes	?	?
Ms. Pac-Man Maze Madness	Full Fat	Namco ^{NA} / Zoo Digital Publishing ^{PAL}	November 3, 2004 (NA); November 19, 2004 (EU)	No	Yes	Yes	?	?
Mucha Lucha! Mascaritas of the Lost Code	Digital Eclipse	Ubisoft	2003 (NA)	No	Yes	No	No	?
Mugen Kinogyou Zero Tours	Amedio	Media Rings	2001 (JP)	Yes	No	No	No	?
Mugenborg	KCET	Konami	2003 (JP)	Yes	No	No	No	?
The Mummy	Ubisoft Milan	Ubisoft	2002 (NA)	No	Yes	Yes	?	?
Muppet Pinball Mayhem	Digital Eclipse	NewKidCo	May 30, 2002 (NA); July 4, 2002 (EU)	No	Yes	Yes	?	?
The Muppets: On With the Show!	Vicarious Visions	TDK Mediactive	February 13, 2003 (NA)	No	Yes	Yes	?	?
Mutsu: Water Looper Mutsu	Alpha Unit	Tomy Corporation	2001 (JP)	Yes	No	No	No	?
MX 2002 featuring Ricky Carmichael	Tiertex Design Studios	THQ	2001 (NA)	No	Yes	Yes	?	?
My Animal Centre in Africa ^{PAL} • SOS Animaux: Mission en Afrique ^{FR} • Meine Tierklinik in Africa ^{DE}	Braingame	Koch Media	2006 (PAL)	No	No	Yes	?	?
My Little Pony Crystal Princess: The Runaway Rainbow	Webfoot Technologies	THQ	September 13, 2006 (NA)	No	Yes	No	No	?
Nakayoshi Mahjan Kaburiichi		Konami	2001 (JP)	Yes	No	No	No	?
Nakayoshi Pet Advance Series 1: Kawaii Hamusutaa	MTO	MTO	2001 (JP)	Yes	No	No	No	?
Nakayoshi Pet Advance Series 2: Kawaii Koinu	MTO	MTO	2002 (JP)	Yes	No	No	No	?
Nakayoshi Pet Advance Series 4: Kawaii Koinu Mini - Wanko to Asobou!! Kogatainu	MTO	MTO	2003 (JP)	Yes	No	No	No	?
Namco Museum	Mass Media	Namco	June 10, 2001 (NA); December 7, 2001 (JP/EU)	Yes	Yes	Yes	?	?
Namco Museum 50th Anniversary	Backbone Vancouver	Namco	August 30, 2005 (NA); March 31, 2006 (EU)	No	Yes	Yes	Yes	?
Nancy Drew: Message in a Haunted Mansion	Handheld Games	DreamCatcher Interactive	2001 (NA)	No	Yes	No	No	?
Napoleon ^{JP} • Napoleon: L'Aigle de Guerrre ^{FR}	Genki	Nintendo	March 21, 2001 (JP); November 21, 2001 (EU)	Yes	No	Yes	?	?
Nakayoshi Youchien		TDK Core	2002 (JP)	Yes	No	No	No	?
Naruto: Konoha Senki	Amedio	Tomy Corporation	2003 (JP)	Yes	No	No	No	?
Naruto: Ninja Council • Naruto: Ninjutsu Zenkai! Saikyō Ninja Daikesshū ^{JP}	Arc System Works	Tomy Corporation	2003 (JP); 2006 (NA)	Yes	Yes	No	No	?
Naruto: Ninja Council 2 • Naruto: Saikyō Ninja Daikesshu 2 ^{JP}	Aspect Co.	Tomy Corporation	2004 (JP); 2006 (NA)	Yes	Yes	No	No	?
Naruto RPG: Uketsugareshi Hi no Ishi	TOSE	Tomy Corporation	2004 (JP)	Yes	No	No	No	?
NASCAR Heat 2002	Crawfish Interactive	Infogrames	2002 (NA)	No	Yes	No	No	?
Natural 2: Duo		Omega Micott	2002 (JP)	Yes	No	No	No	?
NBA Jam 2002	DC Studios	Acclaim Entertainment	2002 (NA)	No	Yes	Yes	?	?
Need for Speed: Carbon – Own the City	EA Canada	EA Games	2006 (NA)	No	Yes	Yes	?	?
Need for Speed: Most Wanted	EA Canada	Electronic Arts	2005 (NA)	No	Yes	Yes	?	?
Need for Speed: Underground	Pocketeers	Electronic Arts	2003 (NA)	No	Yes	Yes	Yes	?
Need for Speed: Underground 2	Pocketeers	Electronic Arts	2004 (NA)	No	Yes	Yes	?	?
Need for Speed: Porsche Unleashed	Pocketeers	Destination Software	2005 (NA)	No	Yes	Yes	?	?
NGT Next Generation Tennis ^{PAL} • Roland Garros: French Open 2002 ^{FR}	Carapace	Wanadoo Edition, Strategy First	2002 (PAL)	No	No	Yes	?	?
NFL Blitz 2002	OutLook Entertainment	Midway	2001 (NA)	No	Yes	No	No	?
NFL Blitz 2003	OutLook Entertainment	Midway	2002 (NA)	No	Yes	No	No	?
NHL 2002	Budcat Creations	EA Sports	2001 (NA)	No	Yes	No	No	?
NHL Hitz 2003	Exient Entertainment	Midway	2002 (NA)	No	Yes	No	No	?
Nicktoons Racing	Crawfish Interactive	Infogrames	2002 (NA)	No	Yes	Yes	?	?
Nicktoons Unite! ^{NA} • SpongeBob SquarePants and Friends Unite! ^{PAL} • Bob l'éponge et ses Amis: Un pour Tous, Tous pour Un! ^{FR} • SpongeBob Schwammkopf und Seine Freunde: Durch Dick und Dünn! ^{DE} • Bob Esponja y Amigos: ¡Unidos! ^{ES} • SpongeBob SquarePants en Zijn Vrienden: Samen Staan Ze Sterk! ^{NL}	Climax	THQ	2005 (NA)	No	Yes	Yes	?	?
Nicktoons: Attack of the Toybots ^{NA} • Bob l'éponge et Ses Amis: Contre les Robots-Jouets ^{FR} • SpongeBob und siene Freunde: Angriff der Spielzeugroboter ^{DE}	Firemint	THQ	October 23, 2007 (NA)	No	Yes	Yes	Yes	?
Nicktoons: Battle for Volcano Island ^{NA} • SpongeBob SquarePants and Friends: Battle for Volcano Island ^{PAL} • Bob l'éponge et Ses Amis: Attaque sur l'île du Volcan ^{FR} • SpongeBob und Seine Freunde: Schlacht um die Vulkaninsel ^{DE} • Bob Esponja y Amigos: Batalla por la Isla del Volcán ^{ES} • SpongeBob e i suoi Amici: Battaglia sull'Isola del Vulcano ^{IT}	Halfbrick Studios	THQ	2006 (NA)	No	Yes	Yes	Yes	?
Nicktoons: Freeze Frame Frenzy ^{NA} • SpongeBob SquarePants and Friends: Freeze Frame Frenzy ^{PAL} • Bob l'éponge et ses Amis: La Photo en Délire (France) ^{FR} • SpongeBob Schwammkopf und seine Freunde im Fotofieber ^{DE} • Bob Esponja y sus Amigos: La Cámara Loca ^{ES} • SpongeBob SquarePants en Zijn Vrienden: De gekke camera ^{NL}	Altron	THQ	2004 (NA)	No	Yes	Yes	?	?
Ninja Five-O ^{NA} • Ninja Cop ^{PAL}	Hudson Soft	Konami	2003 (NA)	No	Yes	Yes	?	?
No no no Puzzle Chailien	Creatures Inc.	Nintendo	2005 (JP)	Yes	No	No	No	?
No Rules: Get Phat	Flying Tiger Development	TDK Mediactive	2001 (NA)	No	Yes	Yes	?	?
Nobunaga Ibun		Global A	2002 (JP)	Yes	No	No	No	?
Nobunaga No Yabou	Koei/iNiS	Koei	2001 (JP)	Yes	No	No	No	?
Noddy: A Day at Toyland ^{NA, PAL} • Oui-Oui: Une Journée Au Pays des Jouets ^{FR}	Lucky Jump	The Game Factory	2006 (NA)	No	Yes	Yes	?	?
Nyan Nyan Nyanko no Nyan Collection	MTO	MTO	2005 (JP)	Yes	No	No	No	?
Ochaken no Bouken Jima: Honwaka Yume no Island		MTO	2005 (JP)	Yes	No	No	No	?
Ochaken Kururin: Honwaka Puzzle de Hotto Shiyo?		MTO	2004 (JP)	Yes	No	No	No	?
Ochaken no Heya		MTO	2003 (JP)	Yes	No	No	No	?
Ochaken no Yume Bouken		MTO	2005 (JP)	Yes	No	No	No	?
Oddworld: Munch's Oddysee	Art	THQ	2003 (NA)	No	Yes	Yes	?	?
Ohanaya-san Monogatari		TDK Core	2002 (JP)	Yes	No	No	No	?
Ojarumaru: Gekkou Machi Sanpo de Ojaru		MTO	2003 (JP)	Yes	No	No	No	?
Okaitoku Series 5: Puzzle & Tantei Collection (Puzzle & Tantei Collection)	Culture Brain	Culture Brain	2003 (JP)	Yes	No	No	No	?
Okuman Chouja Game: Nottori Daisakusen!	Mobile21	Bandai	2001 (JP)	Yes	No	No	No	?
Onimusha Tactics	Capcom	Capcom	July 25, 2003 (JP); November 11, 2003 (NA); December 5, 2003 (EU)	Yes	Yes	Yes	?	?
One Piece: Going Baseball - Kaizoku Yakyuu ^{JP} • One Piece: Going Baseball: Haejeok Yagu ^{KR}	Now Production	Bandai	2004 (NA)	Yes	No	No	No	Yes
One Piece: Dragon Dream!	M2	Bandai	2005 (JP)	Yes	No	No	No	?
Onmyou Taisenki: Zeroshiki	Kamui	Bandai	2004 (JP)	Yes	No	No	No	?
Open Season ^{NA, PAL} • Les Rebelles de la Forêt ^{FR} • Colegas en el Bosque ^{ES} • Boog & Elliot: A Caccia di Amici ^{IT}	Ubisoft Montreal	Ubisoft	2006 (NA)	No	Yes	Yes	?	?
Operation: Armored Liberty	Majesco	Majesco	2003 (NA)	No	Yes	Yes	?	?
Oriental Blue: Ao no Tengai	Hudson	Nintendo	October 24, 2003 (JP)	Yes	No	No	No	?
Oshaberi Inko Club		Alpha Unit	2002 (JP)	Yes	No	No	No	?
Oshare Princess	Culture Brain	Culture Brain	2002 (JP)	Yes	No	No	No	?
Oshare Princess 2 + Doubutsu Kyaranabi Uranai	Culture Brain	Culture Brain	2002 (JP)	Yes	No	No	No	?
Oshare Princess 3	Culture Brain	Culture Brain	2003 (JP)	Yes	No	No	No	?
Oshare Princess 5	Culture Brain	Culture Brain	2005 (JP)	Yes	No	No	No	?
Ottifanten Pinball ^{DE}	Independent Arts	Trend Verlag	2005 (PAL)	No	No	Yes	?	?
Over the Hedge ^{NA, PAL} • Nos Voisins, les Hommes ^{FR} • Ab durch die Hecke ^{DE} • Vecinos Invasores ^{ES} • La Gang del Bosco ^{IT}	Vicarious Visions	Activision	2006 (NA)	No	Yes	Yes	?	?
Over the Hedge: Hammy Goes Nuts! ^{NA, PAL} • Nos Voisins, les Hommes: Zamy Pète Les Plombs! ^{FR} • Ab durch die Hecke: Hammy Dreht Durch ^{DE} • Vecinos Invasores: ¡Hammy Enloquece! ^{ES} • La Gang del Bosco: Hammy si Scatena ^{IT}	Vicarious Visions	Activision	2006 (NA)	No	Yes	Yes	?	?
Ozzy & Drix	Raylight Studios	Midway	2003 (NA)	No	Yes	No	No	?
Pac-Man Collection	Mass Media	Namco	July 21, 2001 (NA); December 7, 2001 (EU); January 11, 2002 (JP)	Yes	Yes	Yes	Yes	?
Pac-Man Pinball Advance	HumanSoft	Namco, Zoo Digital Publishing	May 2, 2005 (NA); August 19, 2002 (EU)	No	Yes	Yes	?	?
Pac-Man World	Full Fat	Namco, Zoo Digital Publishing	November 17, 2004 (NA); November 26, 2004 (EU)	No	Yes	Yes	?	?
Pac-Man World 2	Full Fat	Namco, Zoo Digital Publishing	August 19, 2005 (EU); October 9, 2005 (NA)	No	Yes	Yes	?	?
Paperboy / Rampage	DSI Games	DSI Games	2005 (NA)	No	Yes	Yes	?	?
Pawa Poke Dash		Konami	2006 (JP)	Yes	No	No	No	?
Paws & Claws: Best Friends - Dogs & Cats ^{NA} • Best Friends: Hunde & Katzen ^{DE}	Sproing	THQ	2007 (NA)	No	Yes	Yes	?	?
Paws & Claws: Pet Resort ^{NA} • My Pet Hotel ^{PAL} • Meine Tierpension ^{DE} • Léa Passion Vétérinaire ^{FR} • Mijn Dierenpension: Huisdieren logeren graag bij jou! ^{NL}	Independent Arts	THQ	2006 (NA)	No	Yes	Yes	?	?
Paws & Claws: Pet Vet ^{NA} • Meine Tierarztpraxis ^{DE} • Mijn Dierenpraktijk ^{NL}	Independent Arts	DTP Entertainment	2006 (NA)	No	Yes	Yes	?	?
Payback	Apex Designs	Zoo Digital Publishing	November 19, 2004 (EU)	No	No	Yes	?	?
Peter Pan: The Motion Picture Event	Saffire	Atari	2003 (NA)	No	Yes	Yes	?	?
Petz: Hamsterz 2 ^{NA} • Hamster Gurakubu 3 ^{JP}	Jorudan	Ubisoft	2007 (NA)	Yes	Yes	No	No	?
Petz Vet ^{NA} • Himawari Doubutsu Byouin Pet no Oishasan ^{JP}	Sensory Sweep	Ubisoft	2007 (NA)	Yes	Yes	No	No	?
Phalanx	Kemco	Kemco	October 26, 2001 (JP); November 23, 2001 (EU); December 27, 2001 (NA)	Yes	Yes	Yes	?	?
Phantasy Star Collection	Digital Eclipse	THQ	November 25, 2002 (NA); March 7, 2003 (EU)	No	Yes	Yes	?	?
Phil of the Future	Handheld Games	Buena Vista Games	2006 (NA)	No	Yes	No	No	?
Pia Carrot e Youkoso!! 3.3 (Welcome to Pia Carrot 3.3)	F&C	NEC Interchannel	2004 (JP)	Yes	No	No	No	?
Piglet's Big Game ^{NA, PAL} • Les Aventures de Porcinet ^{FR} • Ferkels Grosses Abenteuer-Spiel ^{DE}	Doki Denki	Disney Interactive Studios	March 11, 2003 (NA); July 2, 2003 (PAL)	No	Yes	Yes	?	?
Pika Pika Nurse Monogatari: Hatsuratsu Nurse Ikusei Game		TDK Core	2003 (JP)	Yes	No	No	No	?
Pinball Advance	Rebellion Developments	Digital Worldwide	2002 (PAL)	No	No	Yes	?	?
Pinball Challenge Deluxe (Pinball Dreams / Pinball Fantasies)	Binary 9 Studios	Ubisoft	2002 (PAL)	No	No	Yes	?	?
The Pinball of the Dead	Sega	THQ	2002 (NA)	Yes	Yes	Yes	?	?
Pinball Tycoon	Ignition Entertainment	AIA	2003 (NA)	No	Yes	Yes	?	?
Pink Panther: Pinkadelic Pursuit	Super Empire	DreamCatcher Interactive	2002 (NA)	No	Yes	Yes	?	?
Pinky and the Brain: The Masterplan ^{PAL} • Mignolo e il Professore: Alla Conquista del Mondo ^{IT}	Warthog	Swing! Deutschland	2002 (PAL)	No	No	Yes	?	?
Pinky Monkey Town	Starfish	Starfish	2001 (JP)	Yes	No	No	No	?
Pinobee & Phoebee	Artoon	Hudson	2002 (JP)	Yes	No	No	No	?
Pinobee: Wings of Adventure ^{NA, PAL} • Pinobee no Daibouken ^{JP} • Pinobee: Les Ailes de L'Aventure ^{FR}	Artoon	Activision	March 21, 2001 (JP); June 11, 2001 (NA); June 22, 2001 (EU)	Yes	Yes	Yes	?	?
Pirates of the Caribbean: The Curse of the Black Pearl	Pocket Studios	TDK Mediactive	June 19, 2003 (NA); October 24, 2003 (UK)	Yes	Yes	Yes	?	?
Pirates of the Caribbean: Dead Man's Chest ^{NA, PAL} • Pirates Des Caraïbes: Le Secret du Coffre Maudit ^{FR} • Pirates of the Caribbean: Fluch der Karibik 2 ^{DE} • Piratas del Caribe: El Cofre del Hombre Muerto ^{ES}	Amaze Entertainment	Buena Vista Games	June 27, 2006 (NA); July 7, 2006 (EU); July 13, 2006 (AU)	No	Yes	Yes	?	?
Pitfall: The Lost Expedition ^{NA, PAL} • Pitfall: L'Expedition Perdue ^{FR} • Pitfall: Die Verlorene Expedition ^{DE}	Torus Games	Activision	2004 (NA)	No	Yes	Yes	?	?
Pitfall: The Mayan Adventure	Pipe Dream Interactive	Majesco	June 11, 2001 (NA)	No	Yes	Yes	No	?
Pixeline i Pixieland ^{DK}		Krea Medie A/S	November 2, 2007 (PAL)	No	No	Yes	?	?
Planet Monsters	Planet Interactive	Titus Interactive	2001 (NA); 2002 (PAL)	No	Yes	Yes	?	?
Planet of the Apes ^{NA, PAL} • Planète des Singes ^{FR} • Planet der Affen ^{DE} • El Planeta de los Simios ^{ES} • Il Pianeta delle Scimmie ^{IT}	Torus Games	Ubisoft	2001 (NA)	No	Yes	Yes	?	?
Play Novel Silent Hill		Konami	2001 (JP)	Yes	No	No	No	?
Pocket Dogs • Poke Inu: Poket Dog ^{JP}	Agatsuma Entertainment	O3 Entertainment	2005 (NA)	Yes	Yes	No	No	?
Pocket Music • GameBoy Music ^{JP}	Jester Interactive	Rage Software	2002 (NA)	Yes	No	Yes	?	?
Pocket Professor: KwikNotes Volume One		Pocket Direct, L.L.C.	2006 (NA)	No	Yes	No	No	?
Pocky & Rocky with Becky ^{NA} • Kiki KaiKai Advance ^{JP}	Altron	Natsume Inc.	October 5, 2001 (JP); October 18, 2002 (NA)	Yes	Yes	No	No	?
Pokémon Emerald ^{NA, PAL, AU} • Pocket Monsters Emerald ^{JP} • Pokémon: Version Emeraude ^{FR} • Pokémon: Smaragd-Edition ^{DE} • Pokémon: Edición Esmeralda ^{ES} • Pokémon: Versione Smeraldo ^{IT}	Game Freak / Creatures Inc.	Nintendo	September 16, 2004 (JP); April 25, 2005 (NA); October 21, 2005 (EU)	Yes	Yes	Yes	Yes	?
Pokémon FireRed ^{NA, PAL, AU} • Pocket Monsters FireRed ^{JP} • Pokémon: Version Rouge Feu ^{FR} • Pokémon: Feuerrote Edition ^{DE} • Pokémon: Edición Rojo Fuego ^{ES} • Pokémon: Versione Rosso Fuoco ^{IT}	Game Freak	Nintendo	January 29, 2004 (JP); September 7, 2004 (NA); October 1, 2004 (EU)	Yes	Yes	Yes	Yes	?
Pokémon LeafGreen ^{NA, PAL, AU} • Pocket Monsters LeafGreen ^{JP} • Pokémon: Version Vert Feuille ^{FR} • Pokémon: Blattgrüne Edition ^{DE} • Pokémon: Edición Verde Hoja ^{ES} • Pokémon: Versione Verde Foglia ^{IT}	Game Freak	Nintendo	January 29, 2004 (JP); September 7, 2004 (NA); October 1, 2004 (EU)	Yes	Yes	Yes	Yes	?
Pokémon Mystery Dungeon: Red Rescue Team ^{NA, PAL, AU} • Pokémon Fushigi no Danjon Aka no Kyūjotai ^{JP} • Pokémon Donjon Mystère: Equipe de Secours Rouge ^{FR} • Pokémon Mystery Dungeon: Team Rot ^{DE} • Pokémon Mundo Misterioso: Equipo de rescate Rojo ^{ES} • Pokémon Mystery Dungeon: Squadra Rossa ^{IT}	Chunsoft	Nintendo	November 17, 2005 (JP); September 18, 2006 (NA); November 10, 2006 (EU)	Yes	Yes	Yes	Yes	?
Pokémon Pinball: Ruby & Sapphire^{NA, PAL, JP, AU} • Pokémon Pinball: Rubis & Saphir ^{FR} • Pokémon Pinball: Rubin & Saphir ^{DE} • Pokémon Pinball: Rubí y Zafiro ^{ES} • Pokémon Pinball: Rubino e Zaffiro ^{IT}	Jupiter	Nintendo	August 1, 2003 (JP); August 26, 2003 (NA); November 14, 2003 (EU)	Yes	Yes	Yes	Yes	?
Pokémon Ruby ^{NA, PAL, AU} • Pocket Monsters Ruby ^{JP} • Pokémon: Version Rubis ^{FR} • Pokémon: Rubin-Edition ^{DE} • Pokémon: Edición Rubí ^{ES} • Pokémon: Versione Rubino ^{IT}	Game Freak	Nintendo	November 21, 2002 (JP); March 19, 2003 (NA); July 25, 2003 (EU)	Yes	Yes	Yes	Yes	?
Pokémon Sapphire ^{NA, PAL, AU} • Pocket Monsters Sapphire ^{JP} • Pokémon: Version Saphir ^{FR} • Pokémon: Saphir-Edition ^{DE} • Pokémon: Edición Zafiro ^{ES} • Pokémon: Versione Zaffiro ^{IT}	Game Freak	Nintendo	November 21, 2002 (JP); March 19, 2003 (NA); July 25, 2003 (EU)	Yes	Yes	Yes	Yes	?
The Polar Express ^{NA, PAL} • Le Pôle Express ^{FR} • Der Polarexpress ^{DE} • Polar Express ^{ES, IT}	Tantalus	THQ	2004 (NA)	No	Yes	Yes	?	?
Polarium Advance ^{NA, PAL} • Tsuukin Hitofude ^{JP}	Mitchell	Nintendo	October 13, 2005 (JP); March 31, 2006 (PAL); November 13, 2006 (NA)	Yes	Yes	Yes	?	?
Polly Pocket: Super Splash Island	Digital Illusions	VU Games	September 17, 2003 (NA); October 27, 2006 (EU)	No	Yes	Yes	?	?
Popeye: Rush for Spinach	Magic Pockets	Namco, Atari Europe	2005 (NA); 2006 (PAL)	No	Yes	Yes	?	?
Postman Pat and the Greendale Rocket	Otaboo	The Game Factory	2007 (PAL)	No	No	Yes	?	?
Power Pro Kun Pocket 1+2 (Powerful Pro Baseball 1+2)	Diamond Head	Konami	2004 (JP)	Yes	No	No	No	?
Power Pro Kun Pocket 3 (Powerful Pro Baseball 3)	Diamond Head	Konami	2001 (JP)	Yes	No	No	No	?
Power Pro Kun Pocket 4 (Powerful Pro Baseball 4)	Diamond Head	Konami	2002 (JP)	Yes	No	No	No	?
Power Pro Kun Pocket 5 (Powerful Pro Baseball 5)	Diamond Head	Konami	2003 (JP)	Yes	No	No	No	?
Power Pro Kun Pocket 6 (Powerful Pro Baseball 6)	Diamond Head	Konami	2003 (JP)	Yes	No	No	No	?
Power Pro Kun Pocket 7 (Powerful Pro Baseball 7)	Diamond Head	Konami	2004 (JP)	Yes	No	No	No	?
Power Rangers: Dino Thunder ^{NA, PAL} • Power Rangers: Dino Tonnerre ^{FR}	Natsume Co., Ltd.	THQ	2004 (NA)	No	Yes	Yes	?	?
Power Rangers: Ninja Storm	Natsume Co., Ltd.	THQ	2003 (NA)	No	Yes	Yes	?	?
Power Rangers: S.P.D.	Natsume Co., Ltd.	THQ	2005 (NA)	No	Yes	Yes	?	?
Power Rangers: Time Force ^{NA, PAL} • Power Rangers: La Force du Temps ^{FR}	Vicarious Visions	THQ	2001 (NA)	No	Yes	Yes	?	?
Power Rangers: Wild Force	Natsume Co., Ltd.	THQ	August 19, 2002 (NA); September 13, 2002 (PAL)	No	Yes	Yes	No	?
The Powerpuff Girls: Him and Seek	Vicarious Visions	Bam Entertainment	October 29, 2002 (NA)	No	Yes	Yes	?	?
The Powerpuff Girls: Mojo Jojo A-Go-Go	Sennari Interactive	Bam Entertainment	October 31, 2001 (NA)	No	Yes	Yes	?	?
Prehistorik Man	Titus Interactive	Titus Interactive	2001 (NA)	No	Yes	Yes	?	?
Premier Action Soccer ^{PAL} • Anstoss Action ^{DE}	Independent Arts	East Entertainment Media	2006 (PAL)	No	No	Yes	?	?
Premier Manager 2003–04	Zoo Digital Publishing	Zoo Digital Publishing	2003 (PAL)	No	No	Yes	?	?
Premier Manager 2004–2005	Zoo Digital Publishing	Zoo Digital Publishing	2004 (PAL)	No	No	Yes	?	?
Premier Manager 2005–2006	Zoo Digital Publishing	Zoo Digital Publishing	2005 (PAL)	No	No	Yes	?	?
Prince of Persia: The Sands of Time	Ubisoft Montreal	Ubisoft	2003 (NA)	No	Yes	Yes	?	?
Princess Natasha: Student · Secret Agent · Princess	Frame Studios Interactive	DSI Games	2006 (NA)	No	Yes	Yes	?	?
Pro Mahjong Tsuwamono GBA	Culture Brain	Culture Brain	July 11, 2005 (JP)	Yes	No	No	No	?
The Proud Family	Gorilla Systems	Buena Vista Interactive	2005 (NA)	No	Yes	No	No	?
PukuPuku Tennen Kairanban		Victor Interactive Software	2002 (JP)	Yes	No	No	No	?
PukuPuku Tennen Kairanban: Koi no Cupid Daisakusen		Marvelous Entertainment	2004 (JP)	Yes	No	No	No	?
PukuPuku Tennen Kairanban: Youkoso! Illusion Land e		Marvelous Entertainment	2004 (JP)	Yes	No	No	No	?
Punch King	Full Fat	Acclaim	2002 (NA)	No	Yes	Yes	?	?
Puppy Luv: Spa and Resort	Humagade	Activision	2007 (NA)	No	Yes	No	No	?
Puyo Pop	Sonic Team	Sega	October 18, 2001 (JP); February 11, 2002 (NA); February 4, 2002 (EU)	Yes	Yes	Yes	?	?
Puyo Pop Fever ^{PAL} • Puyo Puyo Fever ^{JP}	Sonic Team	Sega	July 24, 2004 (JP); March 24, 2005 (EU)	Yes	No	Yes	?	?
Pyuu to Fuku! Jaguar: Byuu to Deru! Megane-Kun	Intense	Konami	2004 (JP)	Yes	No	No	No	?
Quad Desert Fury	Skyworks Technologies	Majesco	2003 (NA)	No	Yes	Yes (in a compilation)	No	?
R-Type III: The Third Lightning	Raylight Studios	Destination Software	March 26, 2004 (NA); November 19, 2004 (PAL)	No	Yes	Yes	?	?
Racing Fever	Naps Team	Neko Entertainment	2005 (PAL)	No	No	Yes	?	?
Racing Gears Advance	Orbital Media	Orbital Media	December 17, 2004 (PAL); February 8, 2005 (NA)	No	Yes	Yes	?	?
Rampage Puzzle Attack	Ninai Games	Midway	2001 (NA)	No	Yes	Yes	?	?
Rapala Pro Fishing	Torus Games	Activision Value	2004 (NA); 2005 (PAL)	No	Yes	Yes	?	?
Ratatouille	Helixe	THQ	June 26, 2007 (NA)	No	Yes	Yes	?	?
Rave Master: Special Attack Force ^{NA} • Groove Adventure Rave: Hikari to Yami no Daikessen 2 ^{JP}	KCEJ	Konami	2002 (JP); 2005 (NA)	Yes	Yes	No	No	?
Rayman 3	Ubisoft	Ubisoft	February 21, 2003 (EU); March 4, 2003 (NA)	No	Yes	Yes	?	?
Rayman Advance	Digital Eclipse	Ubisoft	June 11, 2001 (NA); June 22, 2001 (PAL)	No	Yes	Yes	?	?
Rayman: Hoodlum's Revenge ^{NA} • Rayman: Hoodlums' Revenge ^{PAL} • Rayman: La Revanche Des Hoodlums ^{FR} • Rayman: Die Rache Der Hoodlums ^{DE}	Backbone Entertainment	Ubisoft	March 15, 2005 (NA); March 18, 2005 (EU)	No	Yes	Yes	?	?
Rayman Raving Rabbids ^{NA, PAL} • Rayman Contre Les Lapins Crétins ^{FR}	Visual Impact	Ubisoft	November 14, 2006 (NA); December 7, 2006 (EU)	No	Yes	Yes	Yes	?
Razor Freestyle Scooter ^{NA} • Freestyle Scooter ^{PAL}	Crave	Crave	2001 (NA)	No	Yes	Yes	?	?
Ready 2 Rumble Boxing: Round 2	Crawfish Interactive	Midway	2001 (NA)	No	Yes	Yes	?	?
Rebelstar: Tactical Command	Codo Technologies	Namco	2005 (NA); 2006 (PAL)	No	Yes	Yes	Yes	?
Rec Room Challenge: Darts / Roll-a-Ball / Shuffle Bowl	Skyworks Technologies	Majesco	2005 (NA)	No	Yes	Yes	No	?
Recca no Honō: Flame of Recca		Konami	2001 (JP)	Yes	No	No	No	?
Reign of Fire	Crawfish Interactive	BAM! Entertainment	2002 (NA)	No	Yes	Yes	?	?
Relaxuma na Mainichi		Imagineer	2005 (JP)	Yes	No	No	No	?
Rescue Heroes: Billy Blazes	WayForward	Vivendi Universal Games	March 17, 2003 (NA)	No	Yes	No	No	?
The Revenge of Shinobi	3d6 Games	THQ	November 19, 2002 (NA); May 23, 2003 (PAL)	No	Yes	Yes	?	?
The Revenge of the Smurfs ^{NA, PAL} • La Revanche des Schtroumpfs / De Wraak van de Smurfen ^{FR, NL} • Die Schlümpfe schlagen zurück ^{DE} • Las Vengaza de los Pitufos ^{ES} • La Rivincita dei Puffi ^{IT}	Bit Managers	Infogrames	2002 (PAL)	No	No	Yes	?	?
Rhythm Tengoku	Nintendo SPD	Nintendo	August 3, 2006 (JP)	Yes	No	No	No	?
The Ripping Friends: The World's Most Manly Men!	Creations	THQ	2002 (NA)	No	Yes	Yes	?	?
Risk / Battleship / Clue	Gravity-I	DSI Games	2005 (NA)	No	Yes	No	No	?
River City Ransom EX ^{NA} • Downtown Nekketsu Monogatari EX ^{JP}	Million Co., Ltd.	Atlus	March 5, 2004 (JP); May 26, 2004 (NA)	Yes	Yes	No	No	?
Riviera: The Promised Land ^{NA} • Riviera: Yakusoku no Chi Riviera ^{JP}	Sting	Atlus	2004 (JP); 2005 (NA)	Yes	Yes	No	No	?
Road Rash: Jailbreak	Magic Pockets	Electronic Arts	2003 (NA)	No	Yes	Yes	?	?
Road Trip: Shifting Gears ^{NA} • Gadget Racers ^{PAL} • Choro Q Advance 2 ^{JP}	Electronics Application	Conspiracy Entertainment	November 28, 2002 (JP); February 18, 2003 (PAL); April 6, 2004 (NA)	Yes	Yes	Yes	?	?
Robopon 2: Cross Version ^{NA} • Robot Ponkottsu 2: Cross Version ^{JP}	RED Entertainment	Atlus	September 13, 2001 (JP); June 11, 2002 (NA)	Yes	Yes	No	No	?
Robopon 2: Ring Version ^{NA} • Robot Ponkottsu 2: Ring Version ^{JP}	RED Entertainment	Atlus	September 13, 2001 (JP); June 11, 2002 (NA)	Yes	Yes	No	No	?
Robot Wars: Advanced Destruction	Crawfish Interactive	BBC Multimedia, Vivendi Universal Games	2001 (PAL); 2002 (NA)	No	Yes	Yes	?	?
Robot Wars: Extreme Destruction	Gamezlab	BBC Multimedia	2002 (PAL)	No	No	Yes	?	?
Robotech: The Macross Saga	Lucky Chicken	TDK Mediactive	2002 (NA)	No	Yes	Yes	?	?
Robots	Amaze Entertainment	Vivendi Universal Games	2005 (NA)	Yes	Yes	Yes	?	?
Rock 'Em Sock 'Em Robots	Full Fat	DSI Games	October 26, 2006 (NA); December 1, 2006 (EU)	No	Yes	Yes	?	?
Rock n' Roll Racing	Mass Media	Blizzard Entertainment	June 23, 2003 (NA); August 15, 2003 (EU)	No	Yes	Yes	?	?
Rocket Power: Beach Bandits	Helixe	THQ	2002 (NA)	No	Yes	Yes	No	?
Rocket Power: Dream Scheme ^{NA, PAL} • Rocket Power: Le Cauchemar d'Otto ^{FR}	Helixe	THQ	2001 (NA)	No	Yes	Yes	?	?
Rocket Power: Zero Gravity Zone	Altron	THQ	2003 (NA)	No	Yes	No	No	?
Rockman EXE 4.5: Real Operation	Capcom	Capcom	August 6, 2004 (JP)	Yes	No	No	No	?
Rocky	Virtucraft	Ubisoft	2002 (NA); 2005 (PAL)	No	Yes	Yes	?	?
RPG Tsukuru Advance	Enterbrain	Enterbrain	April 25, 2003 (JP)	Yes	No	No	No	?
Rugrats Go Wild ^{NA, PAL} • Les Razmoket Rencontrent les Delajungle ^{FR}	Magellan Interactive	THQ	2003 (NA)	No	Yes	Yes	?	?
Rugrats: Castle Capers ^{NA, PAL} • Les Razmoket: Voler n'est pas Jouer ^{FR} • Rugrats: Travesuras en el Castillo ^{ES}	Software Creations	THQ	2001 (NA)	No	Yes	Yes	?	?
Rugrats: I Gotta Go Party ^{NA, PAL} • Les Razmoket: A Moi la Fiesta ^{FR}	Eurocom	THQ	2002 (NA)	No	Yes	Yes	?	?
Sabre Wulf	Rare	THQ	2004 (NA)	No	Yes	Yes	?	?
Sabrina The Teenage Witch: Potion Commotion	Ubisoft	Ubisoft	2002 (NA)	No	Yes	Yes	?	?
Saibara Rieko no Dendou Mahjong	Warashi	Media Rings	2001 (JP)	Yes	No	No	No	?
Sakura Momoko no Ukiuki Carnival	Indies Zero	Nintendo	2002 (JP)	Yes	No	No	No	?
Salt Lake 2002	DC Studios	Ubisoft	2002 (NA)	No	Yes	Yes	?	?
Samurai Deeper Kyo	Marvelous Entertainment	Bold Games	December 27, 2002 (JP); February 12, 2008 (NA)	Yes	Yes	No	No	?
Samurai Evolution: Oukoku Geist	TeaSet	Enix	2002 (JP)	Yes	No	No	No	?
Samurai Jack: The Amulet of Time	Virtucraft	BAM! Entertainment	2003 (NA)	No	Yes	Yes	?	?
San Goku Shi (Romance of the Three Kingdoms)	Koei	Koei	2005 (JP)	Yes	No	No	No	?
San Goku Shi: Eiketsuden	Koei	Koei	2005 (JP)	Yes	No	No	No	?
San Goku Shi: Koumeiden	Koei	Koei	2005 (JP)	Yes	No	No	No	?
Sanrio Puro Land All-Characters		Tomy Corporation	2003 (JP)	Yes	No	No	No	?
Sansara Naga 1x2	Groove Box Japan	Victor Interactive Software	2001 (JP)	Yes	No	No	No	?
Santa Claus Jr. Advance ^{NA, PAL} • Père Noël Advance ^{FR}	Neon Studios	JoWooD Productions	2002 (PAL)	No	No	Yes	?	?
Santa Claus Saves the Earth	Ivolgamus	Telegames	2002 (PAL)	No	No	Yes	?	?
The Santa Clause 3: The Escape Clause	1st Playable Productions	Buena Vista Games	2006 (NA)	No	Yes	No	No	?
Scan Hunter		Pacific Century Cyber Works	2002 (JP)	Yes	No	No	No	?
Scooby-Doo!	Helixe	THQ	2002 (NA)	No	Yes	Yes	?	?
Scooby-Doo 2: Monsters Unleashed ^{NA, PAL} • Scooby-Doo 2: Les Monstres se Dechainent ^{FR} • Scooby-Doo 2: Die Monster Sind Los ^{DE}	Altron	THQ	2004 (NA)	No	Yes	Yes	?	?
Scooby-Doo and the Cyber Chase ^{NA, PAL} • Scooby-Doo et la Cybertraque ^{FR} • Scooby-Doo und die Cyber-Jagd ^{DE}	Software Creations	THQ	2001 (NA)	No	Yes	Yes	?	?
Scooby-Doo! Mystery Mayhem ^{NA, PAL} • Scooby-Doo! Le Livre des Ténèbres ^{FR} • Scooby-Doo! Fluch der Folianten ^{DE}	Artificial Mind and Movement	THQ	2003 (NA)	No	Yes	Yes	?	?
Scooby-Doo! Unmasked ^{NA, PAL} • Scooby-Doo! Démasqué ^{FR}	Artificial Mind and Movement	THQ	2005 (NA)	No	Yes	Yes	?	?
The Scorpion King: Sword of Osiris	WayForward	Universal Interactive	2002 (NA)	No	Yes	Yes	?	?
Scrabble	Runecraft	Ubisoft	2002 (PAL)	No	No	Yes	?	?
Scrabble Blast! ^{NA} • Scrabble Scramble ^{PAL}	Visual Impact	Destination Software	May 2, 2005 (NA)	No	Yes	Yes	?	?
Scurge: Hive	Orbital Media	SouthPeak Games	2006 (NA)	No	Yes	Yes	?	?
SD Gundam G Generation Advance	Vanguard	Bandai	2003 (JP)	Yes	No	No	No	?
SD Gundam Force	Tom Create	Bandai	2004 (NA)	Yes	Yes	No	No	?
Sea Trader: Rise of Taipan	Jaleco Entertainment	Jaleco Entertainment	December 20, 2002 (NA)	No	Yes	No	No	?
Secret Agent Barbie: Royal Jewels Mission ^{NA} • Barbie Software - Secret Agent Barbie ^{PAL}	Digital Illusions	Vivendi Universal Games	October 8, 2002 (NA); November 22, 2002 (EU)	No	Yes	Yes	?	?
Sega Arcade Gallery	Sega	THQ	May 22, 2003 (NA); August 1, 2003 (EU)	No	Yes	Yes	?	?
Sega Rally Championship	Dice	Sega	December 19, 2002 (JP); March 11, 2003 (NA); May 2, 2003 (EU)	Yes	Yes	Yes	?	?
Sega Smash Pack	CodeFire	THQ	September 23, 2002 (NA); August 1, 2003 (EU)	No	Yes	Yes	?	?
Sengoku Kakumei Gaiden	KCE Studios	Konami	2003 (JP)	Yes	No	No	No	?
Sennen Kazoku	Indies Zero	Nintendo	March 10, 2005 (JP)	Yes	No	No	No	?
Sentouin: Yamada Hajime	Rokumendo	Kids Station	2004 (JP)	Yes	No	No	No	?
Serious Sam Advance	Climax	Global Star Software	2004 (NA)	No	Yes	Yes	?	?
Shaman King Chou Senjiryakketsu 2	Studio Saizensen	Konami	2002 (JP)	Yes	No	No	No	?
Shaman King Chou Senjiryakketsu 3	Studio Saizensen	Konami	2002 (JP)	Yes	No	No	No	?
Shaman King: Legacy of the Spirits, Soaring Hawk	Konami	Konami	2005 (NA)	No	Yes	No	No	?
Shaman King: Legacy of the Spirits, Sprinting Wolf	Konami	Konami	2005 (NA)	No	Yes	No	No	?
Shaman King: Master of Spirits	Konami	Konami	2004 (NA); 2005 (PAL)	No	Yes	Yes	?	?
Shaman King: Master of Spirits 2	Konami	Konami	2005 (NA); 2006 (PAL)	No	Yes	Yes	?	?
Shamu's Deep Sea Adventures	Humagade	Activision	2005 (NA)	No	Yes	Yes	Yes	?
Shanghai Advance	SunSoft	SunSoft	December 14, 2001 (JP)	Yes	No	No	No	?
Shark Tale ^{NA, JP, PAL} • Gang De Requins ^{FR} • Große Haie-Kleine Fische ^{DE} • El Espantatiburones ^{ES}	Vicarious Visions	Activision	September 21, 2004 (AU); September 29, 2004 (NA); October 1, 2004 (EU)	Yes	Yes	Yes	?	?
Shaun Palmer's Pro Snowboarder	Natsume Co., Ltd.	Activision	2001 (NA)	No	Yes	Yes	?	?
Sheep ^{PAL} • Hitsuji no Kimochi ^{JP}	Capcom	Empire Interactive	2002 (PAL)	Yes	No	Yes	?	?
Shikakui Atama o Maru Kusuru Advance: Kanji Keisanhen		Rocket Company	2004 (JP)	Yes	No	No	No	?
Shikakui Atama o Maru Kusuru Advance: Kokugo Sansuu Shakai Rikahen		Rocket Company	2004 (JP)	Yes	No	No	No	?
Shimura Ken no Bakatono-sama: Bakushou Tenka Touitsu Game	Kamui	TDK Core	2002 (JP)	Yes	No	No	No	?
Shin Bokura no Taiyō: Gyakushū no Sabata (Boktai 3: Sabata's Counterattack)	Hideo Kojima Production	Konami	2005 (JP)	Yes	No	No	No	?
Shin Kisekae Monogatari		Marvelous Entertainment	2003 (JP)	Yes	No	No	No	?
Shin Megami Tensei		Atlus	2003 (JP)	Yes	No	No	No	?
Shin Megami Tensei II		Atlus	2003 (JP)	Yes	No	No	No	?
Shin Megami Tensei: Devil Children - Messiah Riser	Rocket Company	Atlus	2004 (JP)	Yes	No	No	No	?
Shin Megami Tensei: Devil Children - Puzzle de Call!		Atlus	2003 (JP)	Yes	No	No	No	?
Shin Megami Tensei: Devil Children 2 - Honoo no Sho		Atlus	2003 (JP)	Yes	No	No	No	?
Shin Megami Tensei: Devil Children 2 - Koori no Sho		Atlus	2003 (JP)	Yes	No	No	No	?
Shin Nippon Pro Wrestling: Toukon Retsuden Advance		Tomy Corporation	2002 (JP)	Yes	No	No	No	?
Shingata Medarot: Kabuto Version	Natsume Co., Ltd.	Imagineer	2004 (JP)	Yes	No	No	No	?
Shingata Medarot: Kuwagata Version	Natsume Co., Ltd.	Imagineer	2004 (JP)	Yes	No	No	No	?
Shining Force: Resurrection of the Dark Dragon ^{NA, PAL} • Shining Force: Kuroki Ryuu no Fukkatsu ^{JP}	Amusement Vision	Atlus	April 30, 2004 (EU); June 8, 2004 (NA); August 5, 2004 (JP)	Yes	Yes	Yes	?	?
Shining Soul	Nex Entertainment	Atlus	March 28, 2002 (JP); March 7, 2003 (EU); September 16, 2003 (NA)	Yes	Yes	Yes	?	?
Shining Soul II	Nex Entertainment	Atlus	July 24, 2003 (JP); March 26, 2004 (EU); April 24, 2004 (NA)	Yes	Yes	Yes	?	?
Shiren Monsters: Netsal		ChunSoft	2004 (JP)	Yes	No	No	No	?
Shonen Jump's One Piece	Dimps	Bandai	2005 (NA)	No	Yes	No	No	?
Shoubushi Densetsu Tetsuya: Yomigaeru Densetsu (Gambler Densetsu Tetsuya: Yomigaeru Densetsu)		Athena	2002 (JP)	Yes	No	No	No	?
Shrek: Hassle at the Castle	TOSE	TDK Mediactive	2002 (NA)	No	Yes	Yes	?	?
Shrek: Reekin' Havoc	TOSE	TDK Mediactive	2003 (NA)	No	Yes	Yes	?	?
Shrek Smash n' Crash Racing	Torus Games	Activision	November 15, 2006 (NA); February 6, 2007 (EU); February 14, 2007 (AU)	No	Yes	Yes	Yes	?
Shrek SuperSlam	Shaba Games	Activision	October 25, 2005 (NA); November 18, 2005 (EU/PAL)	No	Yes	Yes	?	?
Shrek Swamp Kart Speedway	Prolific	TDK Mediactive	2002 (NA)	No	Yes	Yes	?	?
Shrek 2	Vicarious Visions	Activision	May 4, 2004 (NA); June 18, 2004 (EU/PAL)	No	Yes	Yes	?	?
Shrek 2: Beg for Mercy! ^{NA, PAL} • Shrek 2: La Charge Zéroïque ^{FR} • Shrek 2: Flehe um Gnade! ^{DE} • Shrek 2: Suplicad Piedad ^{ES} • Shrek 2: Gatto all'Attacco! ^{IT}	Vicarious Visions	Activision	October 26, 2004 (NA/EU)	No	Yes	Yes	?	?
Shrek the Third ^{NA, PAL} • Shrek Le Troisieme ^{FR} • Shrek der Dritte ^{DE} • Shrek Tercero ^{ES} • Shrek Terzo ^{IT} • Shrek de Derde ^{NL}	Vicarious Visions	Activision	May 15, 2007 (NA)	No	Yes	Yes	Yes	?
Sigma Star Saga	WayForward	Namco	August 15, 2005 (NA); June 23, 2006 (EU)	No	Yes	Yes	?	?
Silent Scope	Konami	Konami	2002 (NA)	Yes	Yes	Yes	?	?
Silk to Cotton	Kiki Co., Ltd.	Mig Entertainment	2002 (JP)	Yes	No	No	No	?
SimCity 2000	Full Fat	Destination Software	2003 (NA)	No	Yes	Yes	?	?
Simple 2960 Tomodachi Series Vol. 1: The Table Game Collection	Access	D3 Publisher	2003 (JP)	Yes	No	No	No	?
Simple 2960 Tomodachi Series Vol. 2: The Block Kuzushi	Access	D3 Publisher	2003 (JP)	Yes	No	No	No	?
Simple 2960 Tomodachi Series Vol. 3: The Itsudemo Puzzle	BeeWorks	D3 Publisher	2003 (JP)	Yes	No	No	No	?
Simple 2960 Tomodachi Series Vol. 4: The Trump	Access	D3 Publisher	2003 (JP)	Yes	No	No	No	?
The Simpsons: Road Rage	Altron	THQ	June 27, 2003 (EU); July 3, 2003 (NA)	No	Yes	Yes	?	?
The Sims 2 ^{NA, PAL} • Le Sims 2 ^{FR} • Die Sims 2 ^{DE} • Los Sims 2 ^{ES} • De Sims 2 ^{NL}	Maxis	Electronic Arts	2005 (NA)	No	Yes	Yes	?	?
The Sims Bustin' Out ^{NA, PAL} • Les Sims: Permis de Sortir ^{FR} • Die Sims: Brechen Aus ^{DE} • Los Sims: Toman la Calle ^{ES} • The Sims: Fuori Tutti! ^{IT} • The Sims: Erop Uit! ^{NL}	Maxis	Electronic Arts	2003 (NA)	Yes	Yes	Yes	Yes	?
The Sims 2: Pets ^{NA, PAL} • Les Sims 2: Animaux & Cie ^{FR} • Die Sims 2: Haustiere ^{DE} • Los Sims 2: Mascotas ^{ES} • De Sims 2: Huisdieren ^{NL}	Maxis	Electronic Arts	2006 (NA)	No	Yes	Yes	Yes	?
Sister Princess: Re Pure		Marvelous Entertainment	2003 (JP)	Yes	No	No	No	?
Sitting Ducks ^{NA, PAL} • Croque Canards ^{FR}	LSP	Hip Games	2004 (NA)	No	Yes	Yes	?	?
Sky Dancers	David A. Palmer Productions	Crave	October 31, 2005 (NA/EU/PAL)	No	Yes	Yes	?	?
Slime MoriMori Dragon Quest: Shougeki No Shippo Dan	TOSE	Square Enix	November 14, 2003 (JP)	Yes	No	No	No	?
Slot! Pro Advance: Takarabune & Ooedo Sakura Fubuki 2	Nippon Telenet	Nippon Telenet	2001 (JP)	Yes	No	No	No	?
Slot! Pro 2 Advance: Go Go Juggler & New Tairyou		Nippon Telenet	2002 (JP)	Yes	No	No	No	?
Smashing Drive	Raylight Studios	DSI Games	September 7, 2004 (NA)	No	Yes	Yes	?	?
Smuggler's Run	Rebellion	Destination Software	2002 (NA)	No	Yes	Yes	?	?
Snap Kids		Square Enix	2002 (JP)	Yes	No	No	No	?
Snood	Rebellion Developments	Destination Software	2001 (NA)	No	Yes	Yes	?	?
Snood 2: On Vacation	Rebellion Developments	Destination Software	2005 (NA)	No	Yes	Yes	?	?
Soccer Kid	Krisalis Software Ltd.	Telegames	2002 (NA)	No	Yes	Yes	?	?
Sonic Advance	Sonic Team	Sega / THQ	December 20, 2001 (JP); February 3, 2002 (NA); March 28, 2002 (EU)	Yes	Yes	Yes	?	?
Sonic Advance 2	Sonic Team / Dimps	Sega / THQ	December 19, 2002 (JP); March 9, 2003 (NA); March 28, 2003 (EU)	Yes	Yes	Yes	?	?
Sonic Advance 3	Sonic Team / Dimps	Sega / THQ	June 7, 2004 (NA); June 17, 2004 (JP); June 18, 2004 (EU)	Yes	Yes	Yes	Yes	?
Sonic Battle	Sonic Team	Sega / THQ	December 30, 2003 (JP); January 7, 2004 (NA); February 27, 2004 (EU)	Yes	Yes	Yes	?	?
Sonic Pinball Party	Sonic Team	Sega / THQ	June 1, 2003 (NA); July 17, 2003 (JP); October 31, 2003 (EU)	Yes	Yes	Yes	?	?
Sonic the Hedgehog Genesis	Sonic Team	Sega	November 14, 2006 (NA)	No	Yes	No	No	?
Space Channel 5: Ulala's Cosmic Attack	Art	THQ	June 3, 2003 (NA); September 12, 2003 (EU)	No	Yes	Yes	?	?
Space Hexcite: Maetel Legend EX	Jorudan	Jorudan	2001 (JP)	Yes	No	No	No	?
Space Invaders • Space Invaders EX ^{JP}	Torus Games	Activision	March 19, 2002 (NA); May 3, 2002 (EU); August 2, 2002 (JP)	Yes	Yes	Yes	No	?
Speedball 2	Crawfish Interactive	Wanadoo	2002 (PAL)	No	No	Yes	?	?
Spider‑Man: Battle for New York ^{NA, PAL} • Spider-Man: Bataille pour New York ^{FR}	Torus Games	Activision	2006 (NA)	No	Yes	Yes	?	?
Spider‑Man: Mysterio's Menace ^{NA, PAL} • Spider-Man: Mysterio no Kyoui ^{JP}	Vicarious Visions	Activision	September 18, 2001 (NA); September 21, 2001 (EU)	Yes	Yes	Yes	?	?
Spider-Man: The Movie	Digital Eclipse	Activision	2002 (NA)	No	Yes	Yes	?	?
Spider-Man 2	Digital Eclipse	Activision	2004 (NA)	No	Yes	Yes	Yes	?
Spider-Man 3	Vicarious Visions	Activision	May 4, 2007 (NA)	No	Yes	Yes	?	?
Spirit: Stallion of the Cimarron - Search For Homeland ^{NA, PAL} • Spirit: L'Etalon des Plaines - A la Recherche de la Terre Natale ^{FR} • Spirit: Der Wilde Mustang - Auf der Suche nach Homeland ^{DE}	Hyperspace Cowgirls	THQ	2002 (NA)	No	Yes	Yes	?	?
Spirits & Spells ^{NA} • Mahou no Pumpkin ^{JP} • Castleween ^{PAL}	Magic Pockets	DreamCatcher Interactive	2003 (NA)	Yes	Yes	Yes	?	?
SpongeBob SquarePants: Battle for Bikini Bottom ^{NA, PAL} • Bob l'éponge: Bataille Pour Bikini Bottom ^{FR}	Vicarious Visions	THQ	2003 (NA)	No	Yes	Yes	?	?
SpongeBob SquarePants: Creature from the Krusty Krab ^{NA, PAL} • Bob l'éponge: La Creature du Crabe Croustillant ^{FR} • SpongeBob Schwammkopf: Die Kreatur aus der Krossen Krabbe ^{DE} • Bob Esponja: La Criatura del Krustáceo Krujiente ^{ES}	WayForward	THQ	2006 (NA)	No	Yes	Yes	Yes	?
SpongeBob SquarePants: Lights, Camera, Pants! ^{NA, PAL} • Bob l'éponge: Silence On Tourne! ^{FR} • SpongeBob Schwammkopf: Film Ab! ^{DE} • Bob Esponja: ¡Luces, Cámara, Esponja! ^{ES}	WayForward	THQ	2005 (NA)	No	Yes	Yes	?	?
SpongeBob SquarePants: Revenge of the Flying Dutchman	Vicarious Visions	THQ	2002 (NA)	No	Yes	Yes	?	?
SpongeBob SquarePants: SuperSponge	Climax	THQ	November 6, 2001 (NA); November 23, 2001 (PAL)	No	Yes	Yes	No	?
The SpongeBob SquarePants Movie ^{NA, PAL} • Bob L'éponge Le Film ^{FR} • Der SpongeBob Schwammkopf Film ^{DE} • SpongeBob il Film ^{IT}	WayForward	THQ	2004 (NA)	No	Yes	Yes	Yes	?
SpongeBob's Atlantis SquarePantis	Altron	THQ	October 23, 2007 (NA)	No	Yes	No	No	?
Sports Illustrated for Kids Baseball	Sennari Interactive	BAM! Entertainment	2001 (NA)	No	Yes	No	No	?
Sports Illustrated for Kids Football	Sennari Interactive	BAM! Entertainment	2003 (NA)	No	Yes	No	No	?
SpyHunter	Midway	Midway	May 13, 2002 (NA); November 18, 2002 (EU)	No	Yes	Yes	?	?
Spy Hunter / Super Sprint	DSI Games	DSI Games	2005 (NA)	No	Yes	Yes	?	?
Spy Kids 3-D: Game Over	Digital Eclipse	Disney Interactive	2003 (NA)	No	Yes	Yes	?	?
Spy Kids Challenger	Game Titan	Disney Interactive	2002 (NA)	No	Yes	No	No	?
Spy Muppets: License to Croak	Vicarious Visions	TDK Mediactive	November 18, 2003 (NA)	No	Yes	No	No	?
Spyro: Attack of the Rhynocs ^{NA} • Spyro Adventure ^{PAL}	Digital Eclipse	Universal Interactive	October 28, 2003 (NA); November 14, 2003 (EU)	No	Yes	Yes	?	?
Spyro: Season of Ice ^{NA, PAL} • Spyro Advance ^{JP}	Digital Eclipse	Universal Interactive Studios	November 7, 2001 (NA); November 16, 2001 (EU)	Yes	Yes	Yes	?	?
Spyro 2: Season of Flame	Digital Eclipse	Universal Interactive	September 24, 2002 (NA); October 25, 2002 (EU); November 6, 2002 (AU)	No	Yes	Yes	Yes	?
Spyro Orange: The Cortex Conspiracy ^{NA} • Spyro Advance: Wakuwaku Tomodachi Daisakusen ^{JP} • Spyro Fusion ^{PAL}	Vicarious Visions	Vivendi Universal Games	2004 (NA)	Yes	Yes	Yes	?	?
SSX 3	Visual Impact	EA Sports BIG	November 11, 2003 (NA); November 21, 2003 (EU)	No	Yes	Yes	?	?
SSX Tricky	Visual Impact	EA Sports BIG	October 29, 2002 (NA); November 1, 2002 (EU)	No	Yes	Yes	?	?
Starcom: Star Communicator	Konami	Konami	July 26, 2001 (JP)	Yes	No	No	No	?
Stadium Games	Ignition Entertainment	Crave	November 3, 2004 (NA)	No	Yes	Yes	?	?
Star Wars: The New Droid Army	Helixe	THQ	November 8, 2002 (NA); November 29, 2002 (EU)	No	Yes	Yes	?	?
Star Wars Episode I: Jedi Power Battles	Helixe	THQ	December 4, 2001 (NA); March 1, 2002 (EU)	No	Yes	Yes	?	?
Star Wars: Episode II – Attack of the Clones ^{NA, PAL} • Star Wars: Episode II - Angriff der Klonkrieger ^{DE} • Star Wars: Episodio II - El Ataque de los Clones ^{ES}	David A. Palmer Productions	THQ	May 30, 2002 (NA); June 21, 2002 (EU)	No	Yes	Yes	?	?
Star Wars: Episode III – Revenge of the Sith	Ubisoft	Ubisoft	May 5, 2005 (NA/EU)	No	Yes	Yes	?	?
Star Wars: Flight of the Falcon	Pocket Studios	THQ	November 18, 2003 (NA); November 21, 2003 (EU)	No	Yes	Yes	?	?
Star Wars Trilogy: Apprentice of the Force	Ubisoft	Ubisoft	September 21, 2004 (NA); September 23, 2004 (AU); September 24, 2004 (EU)	No	Yes	Yes	Yes	?
Star X	Graphic State	BAM! Entertainment	April 15, 2002 (NA); May 17, 2002 (PAL)	No	Yes	Yes	?	?
Starsky & Hutch	Spellbound	Empire Interactive	2003 (NA)	No	Yes	Yes	?	?
Steel Empire ^{PAL} • Koutetsu Teikoku from Hot-B ^{JP}	Starfish	Zoo Digital Publishing	2005 (NA)	Yes	No	Yes	?	?
Steven Gerrard's Total Soccer 2002 ^{PAL} • Alexander Zickler Total Soccer 2002 ^{DE} • Total Soccer Advance ^{JP}	Exient Entertainment	Ubisoft	2001 (PAL); 2002 (JP)	Yes	No	Yes	?	?
Strawberry Shortcake: Ice Cream Island Riding Camp ^{PAL} • Charlotte aux Fraises: Le Centre d'équitation du Pays de la Crème Glacée ^{FR}	Gorilla Systems	The Game Factory	2006 (PAL)	No	No	Yes	?	?
Strawberry Shortcake: Summertime Adventure	Gorilla Systems	Majesco	2004 (NA)	No	Yes	No	No	?
Strawberry Shortcake: Sweet Dreams	Gorilla Systems	Majesco	2006 (NA)	No	Yes	No	No	?
Street Fighter Alpha 3 ^{NA, PAL} • Street Fighter Zero 3 Upper ^{JP}	Crawfish Interactive	Capcom	September 27, 2002 (JP); November 29, 2002 (EU); December 1, 2002 (NA)	Yes	Yes	Yes	Yes	?
Street Jam Basketball	Prograph	Destination Software	2004 (NA)	No	Yes	Yes	No	?
Street Racing Syndicate	Raylight Studios	Namco	2005 (NA)	No	Yes	Yes	?	?
Strike Force Hydra	Awesome Developments	Ignition Entertainment	October 1, 2003 (NA); October 19, 2003 (EU/PAL)	No	Yes	Yes	?	?
Stuart Little 2	Creations	Activision	2002 (NA)	No	Yes	Yes	?	?
Stuntman	Velez & Dubail	Infogrames	June 24, 2003 (NA); July 4, 2003 (AU); August 8, 2003 (EU)	No	Yes	Yes	Yes	?
Sudoku Fever	Global Star Software	Take-Two Interactive	February 8, 2006 (NA)	No	Yes	Yes	?	?
Sugar Sugar Rune: Heart Ga Ippai! Moegi Gakuen	Open Sesame	Bandai	2005 (JP)	Yes	No	No	No	?
The Suite Life of Zack & Cody: Tipton Caper	Artificial Mind and Movement	Buena Vista Games	2006 (NA)	No	Yes	No	No	?
The Sum of All Fears ^{NA, PAL} • La Somme de Toutes les Peurs ^{FR} • Der Anschlag ^{DE} • The Sum of All Fears (Pánico Nuclear) ^{ES} • Al Vertice della Tensione ^{ES}	Red Storm Entertainment	Ubisoft	2002 (NA)	No	Yes	Yes	?	?
Summon Night: Swordcraft Story ^{NA} • Summon Night: Craft Sword Monogatari ^{JP}	Flight-Plan	Atlus	2004 (JP); 2006 (NA)	Yes	Yes	No	No	?
Summon Night: Swordcraft Story 2 ^{NA} • Summon Night: Craft Sword Monogatari 2 ^{JP}	Flight-Plan	Atlus	2006 (NA)	Yes	Yes	No	No	?
Summon Night Craft Sword Monogatari: Hajimari no Ishi	Flight-Plan	Banpresto	2005 (JP)	Yes	No	No	No	?
Super Army War ^{NA} • Glory Days: The Essence of War ^{PAL}	Capcom	Capcom	2005 (NA)	No	Yes	Yes	?	?
Super Bubble Pop	Runecraft	Jaleco Entertainment	December 20, 2002 (NA)	No	Yes	Yes	?	?
Super Bust-A-Move ^{NA, PAL} • Super Puzzle Bobble Advance ^{JP}	Taito Corporation	Taito Corporation ^{JP} Ubisoft^{NA, PAL}	2001 (NA)	Yes	Yes	Yes	?	?
Super Chinese 1+2 Advance	Culture Brain	Culture Brain	2004 (JP)	Yes	No	No	No	?
Super Collapse! II	GameHouse	Majesco	2002 (NA)	No	Yes	No	No	?
Super Dodge Ball Advance ^{NA, PAL} • Bakunetsu Dodgeball Fighters ^{JP}	Million Co., Ltd.	Atlus	2001 (NA)	Yes	Yes	Yes	?	?
Super Dropzone: Intergalactic Rescue Mission	Pocket Studios	Ignition Entertainment	2003 (PAL); 2004 (NA)	No	Yes	Yes	?	?
Super Duper Sumos	Handheld Games	Midway	2003 (NA)	No	Yes	No	No	?
Super Ghouls 'n Ghosts ^{NA, PAL} • Chou Makai-Mura R ^{JP}	Affect	Capcom	July 19, 2002 (JP); September 23, 2002 (NA); September 27, 2002 (EU)	Yes	Yes	Yes	?	?
Super Hornet F/A-18F	UK Magic	Majesco	2004 (NA)	No	Yes	Yes	No	?
Super Mario Advance	Nintendo	Nintendo	March 21, 2001 (JP); June 11, 2001 (NA); June 22, 2001 (PAL)	Yes	Yes	Yes	Yes	?
Super Mario Advance 4: Super Mario Bros. 3	Nintendo	Nintendo	July 11, 2003 (JP); October 17, 2003 (EU); October 21, 2003 (NA)	Yes	Yes	Yes	Yes	?
Super Mario World: Super Mario Advance 2	Nintendo	Nintendo	December 14, 2001 (JP); February 9, 2002 (NA); April 14, 2002 (EU)	Yes	Yes	Yes	Yes	?
Super Monkey Ball Jr.	Realism	THQ	2002 (NA)	No	Yes	Yes	?	?
Super Puzzle Fighter II ^{NA, PAL} • Super Puzzle Fighter II X ^{JP}	Atomic Planet	Capcom	March 28, 2003 (EU); March 31, 2003 (NA)	No	Yes	Yes	?	?
Super Real Mahjong Dousoukai	A.I	Rocket Company	2004 (JP)	Yes	No	No	No	?
Super Robot Taisen: Original Generation	Banpresto	Banpresto / Atlus	November 22, 2002 (JP); August 8, 2006 (NA); December 31, 2007 (PAL)	Yes	Yes	Yes	?	?
Super Robot Wars OG 2	Banpresto	Banpresto / Atlus	February 3, 2005 (JP); November 21, 2006 (NA); May 1, 2007 (PAL)	Yes	Yes	No	No	?
Super Robot Wars A	A.I	Banpresto	2001 (JP)	Yes	No	No	No	?
Super Robot Wars D	A.I	Banpresto	2003 (JP)	Yes	No	No	No	?
Super Robot Wars J	A.I	Banpresto	2005 (JP)	Yes	No	No	No	?
Super Robot Wars R	A.I	Banpresto	2002 (JP)	Yes	No	No	No	?
Super Street Fighter II Turbo Revival ^{NA, PAL} • Super Street Fighter II X: Revival ^{JP}	Capcom	Capcom	July 13, 2001 (JP); October 30, 2001 (NA); November 2, 2001 (EU)	Yes	Yes	Yes	?	?
Superman: Countdown to Apokolips	Mistic Software	Infogrames	2003 (NA)	No	Yes	Yes	?	?
Superman Returns: Fortress of Solitude ^{NA, PAL} • Superman Returns: La Forteresse de Solitude ^{FR} • Superman Returns: Festung der Einsamkeit ^{DE} • Superman Returns: La Fortaleza de la Soledad ^{ES} • Superman Returns: La Fortezza della Solitudine ^{IT}	EA Tiburon	EA Games	2006 (NA)	No	Yes	Yes	?	?
Surf's Up ^{NA, PAL} • Les Rois de la Glisse ^{FR} • Könige Der Wellen ^{DE} • Locos por el Surf ^{ES} • Surf's Up: I Re Delle Onde ^{IT}	Ubisoft Quebec	Ubisoft	2007 (NA)	No	Yes	Yes	?	?
Sweet Cookie Pie	Culture Brain	Culture Brain	December 21, 2001 (JP)	Yes	No	No	No	?
Sword of Mana^{NA, PAL} • Shinyaku Seiken Densetsu^{JP}	Brownie Brown	Square Enix (Japan), Nintendo (overseas)	August 29, 2003 (JP); December 1, 2003 (NA); March 19, 2004 (EU)	Yes	Yes	Yes	?	?
Sylvanian Families: Fashion Designer ni Naritai! Kurumi Risu no Onna no Ko		Epoch	2004 (JP)	Yes	No	No	No	?
Sylvanian Families 4: Meguru Kisetsu no Tapestry		Epoch	2002 (JP)	Yes	No	No	No	?
Sylvanian Families: Yosei no Stick to Fushigi no Ki - Maron Inu no Onna no Ko		Epoch	2003 (JP)	Yes	No	No	No	?
Tactics Ogre: The Knight of Lodis ^{NA} • Tactics Ogre Gaiden: The Knight of Lodis ^{JP}	Quest	Atlus	2001 (NA)	Yes	Yes	No	No	?
Taiketsu! Ultra Hero		Jorudan	2004 (JP)	Yes	No	No	No	?
Tak and the Power of Juju ^{NA, PAL} • Tak & Le Pouvoir de Juju ^{FR} • Tak und die Macht des Juju ^{DE} • Tak y el Poder Juju ^{ES} • Tak e la Magia Juju ^{IT}	Avalanche Software	THQ	2003 (NA)	No	Yes	Yes	?	?
Tak 2: The Staff of Dreams ^{NA, PAL} • Tak 2: Le Sceptre des Rêves ^{FR} • Tak 2: Der Stab der Träume ^{DE} • Tak 2: Lo Scettro dei Sogni ^{IT}	Avalanche Software	THQ	2004 (NA)	No	Yes	Yes	?	?
Tak: The Great Juju Challenge ^{NA, PAL} • Tak: Die Große Juju-Jagd ^{DE} • Tak: La Grande Sfida ^{IT}	WayForward	THQ	2005 (NA)	No	Yes	Yes	?	?
Tales of Phantasia	Wolf Team	Namco ^{JP} Nintendo ^{NA, PAL, AU}	2003 (JP); 2006 (NA/PAL)	Yes	Yes	Yes	Yes	?
Tales of the World: Narikiri Dungeon 2	Alfa System	Namco	2002 (JP)	Yes	No	No	No	?
Tales of the World: Narikiri Dungeon 3	Alfa System	Namco	2005 (JP)	Yes	No	No	No	?
Tales of the World: Summoner's Lineage	Magical Company	Namco	2003 (JP)	Yes	No	No	No	?
Tanbi Musō: Meine Liebe	Mobile21	Konami	2001 (JP)	Yes	No	No	No	?
Tang Tang	GameVision Corporation	Take-Two Interactive	August 28, 2001 (NA); October 19, 2001 (PAL)	No	Yes	Yes	?	?
Tantei Gakuen Q: Kyuukyoku no Trick ni Idome!		Konami	2004 (JP)	Yes	No	No	No	?
Tantei Gakuen Q: Meitantei Hakimida!		Konami	2003 (JP)	Yes	No	No	No	?
Tantei Jingūji Saburō: Shiroi Kage no Shōjo	WorkJam	Marvelous Entertainment	2005 (JP)	Yes	No	No	No	?
Taxi 3	Visual Impact	Ubisoft	2003 (PAL)	No	No	Yes	?	?
Teen Titans	Artificial Mind and Movement	Majesco	2005 (NA)	No	Yes	No	No	?
Teen Titans 2: The Brotherhood's Revenge	Artificial Mind and Movement	Majesco	2006 (NA)	No	Yes	No	No	?
Teenage Mutant Ninja Turtles	Konami	Konami	2003 (NA)	No	Yes	Yes	?	?
Teenage Mutant Ninja Turtles 2: Battle Nexus	Konami	Konami	2004 (NA)	No	Yes	Yes	?	?
Tekken Advance	Namco	Namco	December 21, 2001 (JP); January 28, 2002 (NA); March 29, 2002 (PAL)	Yes	Yes	Yes	?	?
Ten Pin Alley 2	Pronto Games	XS Games	April 26, 2004 (NA)	No	Yes	No	No	?
Tennis Masters Series 2003	Kaolink	Microïds	2002 (PAL)	No	No	Yes	?	?
Tennis no Oji-Sama: Aim at the Victory!	KCEJ	Konami	2002 (JP)	Yes	No	No	No	?
Tennis no Oji-Sama: Genius Boys Academy	KCEJ	Konami	2002 (JP)	Yes	No	No	No	?
Tennis no Oji-Sama 2003: Cool Blue	KCEJ	Konami	2003 (JP)	Yes	No	No	No	?
Tennis no Oji-Sama 2003: Passion Red	KCEJ	Konami	2003 (JP)	Yes	No	No	No	?
Tennis no Oji-Sama 2004: Glorious Gold	KCEJ	Konami	2004 (JP)	Yes	No	No	No	?
Tennis no Oji-Sama 2004: Stylish Silver	KCEJ	Konami	2004 (JP)	Yes	No	No	No	?
Terminator 3: Rise of the Machines	Taniko	Atari	2003 (NA)	No	Yes	Yes	?	?
Tetris Worlds	Radical Entertainment	THQ	September 24, 2001 (NA); December 7, 2001 (PAL)	Yes	Yes	Yes	?	?
Texas Hold 'Em Poker	Skyworks Technologies	Majesco	November 1, 2004 (NA); March 30, 2005 (EU)	No	Yes	Yes	No	?
That's So Raven	Vicarious Visions	Buena Vista Games	2004 (NA)	No	Yes	No	No	?
That's So Raven 2: Supernatural Style	Artificial Mind and Movement	Buena Vista Games	2005 (NA)	No	Yes	No	No	?
The Three Stooges	Cinemaware	Metro3D	2002 (NA)	No	Yes	No	No	?
Thunder Alley	Pronto Games	XS Games	June 13, 2004 (NA)	No	Yes	No	No	?
Thunderbirds	Saffire	Vivendi Universal Games	2004 (NA)	No	Yes	Yes	?	?
Thunderbirds: International Rescue	Pukka Games	SCi	2001 (PAL)	No	No	Yes	?	?
Tiger Woods PGA Tour 2004	Electronic Arts	Electronic Arts	2003 (NA)	No	Yes	Yes	?	?
Tiger Woods PGA Tour Golf	Rebellion Developments	Destination Software	2002 (NA)	No	Yes	Yes	?	?
Tim Burton's The Nightmare Before Christmas: The Pumpkin King ^{NA, JP, PAL} • L'Etrange Noël de Monsieur Jack: Le Roi des Citrouilles ^{FR} • Pesadilla antes de Navidad de Tim Burton: El Rey Calabaza ^{ES}	TOSE	Buena Vista Interactive	2005 (NA)	Yes	Yes	Yes	?	?
Tiny Toon Adventures: Scary Dreams ^{NA} • Tiny Toon Adventures: Buster's Bad Dream ^{PAL}	Treasure Co. Ltd	Swing! Entertainment	2002 (NA)	No	Yes	Yes	?	?
Tiny Toon Adventures: Wacky Stackers	Warthog	Conspiracy Games	2001 (NA)	No	Yes	Yes	?	?
Tir et But: Edition Champions du Monde		Titus Interactive	2002 (PAL)	No	No	Yes	?	?
Titeuf: Ze Gag Machine	3D Lights	Infogrames	2002 (PAL)	No	No	Yes	?	?
Titeuf: Méga Compet	DREAM ON STUDIO	Atari Europe	2004 (PAL)	No	No	Yes	?	?
TMNT ^{NA, PAL} • TMNT: Les Tortues Ninja ^{FR} • TMNT: Tortugas Ninja Jóvenes Mutantes ^{ES} • TMNT: Tartarughe Ninja ^{IT}	Ubisoft Montreal	Ubisoft	March 20, 2007 (NA)	No	Yes	Yes	Yes	?
TOCA World Touring Cars	Codemasters	Ubisoft	2003 (PAL)	No	No	Yes	?	?
Tokimeki Dream Series 1: Ohanaya-san ni Narou!		MTO	2002 (JP)	Yes	No	No	No	?
Tokyo Majin Gakuen: Fuju Houroku		Marvelous Entertainment	2004 (JP)	Yes	No	No	No	?
Tokyo Xtreme Racer Advance	David A. Palmer Productions	Crave	April 20, 2005 (NA); July 28, 2006 (PAL)	No	Yes	Yes	No	?
Tom and Jerry Tales	Sensory Sweep	Warner Bros. Interactive Entertainment	2006 (NA)	No	Yes	Yes	?	?
Tom and Jerry in Infurnal Escape	CinéGroupe	NewKidCo	2003 (NA)	No	Yes	Yes	?	?
Tom and Jerry: The Magic Ring ^{NA, PAL} • Tom und Jerry: Der Magische Ring ^{DE} • Tom e Jerry: l'Anello Incantato ^{IT}	Cave Barn Studios	NewKidCo	2001 (NA)	No	Yes	Yes	?	?
Tom Clancy's Rainbow Six: Rogue Spear	Ubisoft Milan	Ubisoft	2002 (NA)	No	Yes	Yes	?	?
Tom Clancy's Splinter Cell	Ubisoft Montreal	Ubisoft	2003 (NA)	No	Yes	Yes	?	?
Tom Clancy's Splinter Cell: Pandora Tomorrow	Ubisoft	Ubisoft	2004 (NA)	No	Yes	Yes	?	?
Tomato Adventure	Graphic Research	Nintendo	January 25, 2002 (JP)	Yes	No	No	No	?
Tomb Raider: Legend	HumanSoft	Eidos Interactive	2006 (NA)	No	Yes	Yes	Yes	?
Tomb Raider: The Prophecy	Ubisoft Milan	Ubisoft	2002 (NA)	Yes	Yes	Yes	?	?
Tonka: On The Job	Webfoot Technologies	THQ	November 15, 2006 (NA)	No	Yes	No	No	?
Tony Hawk's American Sk8land	Vicarious Visions	Activision	2005 (NA)	No	Yes	Yes	?	?
Tony Hawk's Downhill Jam	Vicarious Visions	Activision	2006 (NA)	No	Yes	Yes	Yes	?
Tony Hawk's Pro Skater 2 ^{NA, PAL} • SK8: Tony Hawk no Pro Skater 2 ^{JP}	Vicarious Visions	Activision	June 11, 2001 (NA); June 22, 2001 (PAL)	Yes	Yes	Yes	?	?
Tony Hawk's Pro Skater 3	Vicarious Visions	Activision	2002 (NA)	No	Yes	Yes	?	?
Tony Hawk's Pro Skater 4	Vicarious Visions	Activision	2002 (NA)	No	Yes	Yes	?	?
Tony Hawk's Underground	Vicarious Visions	Activision	2003 (NA)	No	Yes	Yes	?	?
Tony Hawk's Underground 2	Vicarious Visions	Activision	2004 (NA)	No	Yes	Yes	Yes	?
Top Gear GT Championship ^{NA, PAL} • Zen Nihon GT Senshuken ^{JP}	Vision Works	Kemco	March 21, 2001 (JP); June 21, 2001 (EU); July 9, 2001 (NA)	Yes	Yes	Yes	?	?
Top Gear Rally ^{NA, PAL} • Top Gear Rally SP ^{JP}	Tantalus	Nintendo	July 25, 2005 (JP); October 27, 2003 (NA); October 31, 2003 (EU); November 14, 2003 (AU)	Yes	Yes	Yes	Yes	?
Top Gun: Combat Zones	Titus Interactive	Titus Interactive	2004 (NA)	No	Yes	No	No	?
Top Gun Firestorm Advance	Titus Interactive	Titus Interactive	2002 (NA)	No	Yes	Yes	No	?
Top Spin 2	Magic Pockets	2K Sports	2006 (NA)	No	Yes	Yes	?	?
Totally Spies!	Mistic Software	Atari	2005 (NA)	No	Yes	Yes	?	?
Totally Spies! 2: Undercover	Mistic Software	Atari	2006 (NA)	No	Yes	Yes	?	?
Toukon Heat		Pacific Century Cyber Works	2002 (JP)	Yes	No	No	No	?
The Tower SP	Vivarium	Nintendo	2005 (NA)	Yes	Yes	No	No	?
Toy Robo Force	Global A	Global A	2001 (JP)	Yes	No	No	No	?
Trick Star	Tantalus	Liquid Games	2006 (PAL)	No	No	Yes	?	?
Tringo	Crave	Crave	June 16, 2006 (NA)	No	Yes	Yes	?	?
Trollz: Hair Affair!	Powerhead Games	Ubisoft	2005 (NA)	No	Yes	Yes	?	?
Tron 2.0: Killer App	Digital Eclipse	Buena Vista Games	2004 (NA)	No	Yes	Yes	?	?
Turbo Turtle Adventure	Iridon Interactive AB	Majesco	October 7, 2002 (NA)	No	Yes	No	No	?
Turok: Evolution	RFX Interactive	Acclaim Entertainment	September 1, 2002 (NA)	No	Yes	Yes	?	?
Tweety & the Magic Gems ^{NA, PAL} • Tweety no Hearty Party ^{JP} • Titi et les Bijoux Magiques ^{FR}	Kemco	Kemco	2001 (NA)	Yes	Yes	Yes	?	?
Twin Series Vol. 1: Mezase Debut! Fashion Designer Monogatari + Kawaii Pet Game Gallery 2	Culture Brain	Culture Brain	2004 (JP)	Yes	No	No	No	?
Twin Series Vol. 2: Oshare Princess 4 + Renai Uranai Daisakusen	Culture Brain	Culture Brain	2004 (JP)	Yes	No	No	No	?
Twin Series Vol. 3: Konchuu Monster: Ouja Ketteisen + Super Chinese Labyrinth	Culture Brain	Culture Brain	2004 (JP)	Yes	No	No	No	?
Twin Series Vol. 4: Ham Ham Monster EX/Fantasy Puzzle Hamster Monogatari	Culture Brain	Culture Brain	2004 (JP)	Yes	No	No	No	?
Twin Series Vol. 5: Wan Wan Meitantei EX/Mahou no Kuni no Keaki-Okusan Monogatari	Culture Brain	Culture Brain	2004 (JP)	Yes	No	No	No	?
Twin Series Vol. 6: Wan Nyon Idol Gakuen/Koinu Toissho Special	Culture Brain	Culture Brain	2004 (JP)	Yes	No	No	No	?
Twin Series Vol. 7: Twin Puzzle: Kisekae Wanko EX + Nyaa to Chuu no Rainbow Magic 2	Culture Brain	Culture Brain	2004 (JP)	Yes	No	No	No	?
Ty the Tasmanian Tiger 2: Bush Rescue ^{NA, PAL} • Ty le Tigre de Tasmanie 2: Opération Sauvetage ^{FR}	Krome Studios	Electronic Arts	2004 (NA)	No	Yes	Yes	?	?
Ty the Tasmanian Tiger 3: Night of the Quinkan	Krome Studios	Activision Value	2005 (NA)	No	Yes	No	No	?
Uchuu no Stellvia	King Records	King Records	2004 (JP)	Yes	No	No	No	?
Uchuu Daisakusen Chocovader: Uchuu kara no Shinryakusha	Namco	Namco	2002 (JP)	Yes	No	No	No	?
Ueki no Hōsoku: Jingi Sakuretsu! Nōryokusha Battle	Banpresto	Banpresto	2006 (JP)	Yes	No	No	No	?
Ultimate Arcade Games	Nocturnal Entertainment	Telegames, Inc.	October 15, 2005 (NA)	No	Yes	No	No	?
Ultimate Beach Soccer ^{NA} • Pro Beach Soccer ^{PAL}	Magic Pockets	DreamCatcher Interactive ^{NA} / Wanadoo ^{PAL}	May 30, 2003 (EU); October 31, 2003 (NA)	No	Yes	Yes	?	?
Ultimate Brain Games	Cosmigo	Telegames, Inc.	March 18, 2003 (NA); March 28, 2003 (PAL)	No	Yes	Yes	No	?
Ultimate Card Games	Cosmigo	Telegames, Inc.	May 25, 2004 (NA/PAL)	No	Yes	Yes	No	?
Ultimate Muscle: The Path of the Superhero ^{NA} • Kinnikuman II Sei: Seigi Choujin e no Michi ^{JP}	Banpresto	Bandai ^{NA} / Banpresto ^{JP}	2002 (JP); 2003 (NA)	Yes	Yes	No	No	?
Ultimate Puzzle Games	Telegames, Inc.	Telegames, Inc.	November 14, 2005 (NA)	No	Yes	No	No	?
Ultimate Spider-Man	Vicarious Visions	Activision	2005 (NA)	No	Yes	Yes	?	?
Ultimate Winter Games	Sproing	Telegames, Inc.	December 5, 2003 (NA)	No	Yes	No	No	?
Ultra Keibitai: Monster Attack	Rocket Company	Rocket Company	2004 (JP)	Yes	No	No	No	?
Unfabulous	WayForward	THQ	2006 (NA)	No	Yes	No	No	?
Uno / Skip-Bo ^{NA} • Uno & Skip-Bo ^{PAL}	Black Lantern Studios	DSI Games ^{NA} / Jack of All Games ^{PAL}	2006 (NA)	No	Yes	Yes	?	?
Uno 52	Black Lantern Studios	DSI Games ^{NA} / Zoo Digital Publishing ^{PAL}	October 23, 2006 (NA); March 2, 2007 (PAL)	No	Yes	Yes	?	?
Uno Free Fall	Black Lantern Studios	DSI Games ^{NA} / Zoo Digital Publishing ^{PAL}	March 2, 2007 (PAL); March 6, 2007 (NA)	No	Yes	Yes	?	?
Urban Yeti!	Cave Barn	Telegames, Inc.	2002 (NA)	No	Yes	Yes	?	?
The Urbz: Sims in the City ^{NA, PAL} • Les Urbz: Les Sims in the City ^{FR} • Die Urbz: Sims in the City ^{DE} • Los Urbz: Sims en la Ciudad ^{ES} • De Urbz: Sims in the City ^{NL}	Griptonite Games	EA Games	2004 (NA)	Yes	Yes	Yes	?	?
V.I.P.	Planet Interactive	Ubisoft	2002 (PAL)	No	No	Yes	?	?
Van Helsing	Saffire	Vivendi Universal Games	May 7, 2004 (NA); May 14, 2004 (EU)	No	Yes	Yes	?	?
Vattroller X	Ganbarion	Bandai	2004 (JP)	Yes	No	No	No	?
VeggieTales: LarryBoy and the Bad Apple	Crave	Crave	2006 (NA)	No	Yes	No	No	?
V Master Cross	Success	Success	2002 (JP)	Yes	No	No	No	?
V-Rally 3	Velez & Dubail	Infogrames	June 21, 2002 (PAL); October 17, 2002 (NA)	Yes	Yes	Yes	?	?
Virtua Tennis	Altron	THQ ^{NA} / Sega ^{PAL}	2002 (NA); 2003 (PAL)	No	Yes	Yes	?	?
Virtual Kasparov	Titus Interactive	Titus Interactive	2002 (NA)	No	Yes	Yes	?	?
W.I.T.C.H.	Climax	Buena Vista Games	2005 (PAL)	No	No	Yes	?	?
Wade Hixton's Counter Punch	Inferno Games	Destination Software ^{NA} / Zoo Digital Publishing ^{PAL}	2004 (NA)	No	Yes	Yes	?	?
Wagamama * Fairy: Mirumo de Pon! DokiDoki Memorial Panic		Konami	2005 (JP)	Yes	No	No	No	?
Wagamama * Fairy: Mirumo de Pon! Hachinin no Toki no Yousei	Jupiter Multimedia	Konami	2003 (JP)	Yes	No	No	No	?
Wagamama * Fairy: Mirumo de Pon! Nazo no Kagi to Shinjitsu no Tobira	Jupiter Multimedia	Konami	2004 (JP)	Yes	No	No	No	?
Wagamama * Fairy: Mirumo de Pon! Ougon Maracas no Densetsu	Jupiter Multimedia	Konami	2002 (JP)	Yes	No	No	No	?
Wagamama * Fairy: Mirumo de Pon! Taisen Mahoudama		Konami	2003 (JP)	Yes	No	No	No	?
Wagamama * Fairy: Mirumo de Pon! Yume no Kakera		Konami	2004 (JP)	Yes	No	No	No	?
Wakeboarding Unleashed Featuring Shaun Murray	Small Rockets	Aspyr	2003 (NA)	No	Yes	Yes	No	?
Wan Wan Meitantei	Culture Brain	Culture Brain	2003 (JP)	Yes	No	No	No	?
Wanko de Kururin! Wankuru		MTO	2004 (JP)	Yes	No	No	No	?
Wanko Mix: Chiwanko World		TDK Core	2004 (JP)	Yes	No	No	No	?
Wan Nyan Doubutsu Byouin		TDK Core	2003 (JP)	Yes	No	No	No	?
Wario Land 4 ^{NA, PAL} • Wario Land Advance ^{JP}	Nintendo R&D1	Nintendo	August 21, 2001 (JP); November 16, 2001 (EU); November 18, 2001 (NA)	Yes	Yes	Yes	Yes	?
WarioWare, Inc.: Mega Microgames! ^{NA} • Made in Wario ^{JP} • Wario Ware, Inc: Minigame Mania ^{PAL} • Wario Ware, Inc.: Minigame Mania - Mega Mini-Jeux ^{FR}	Nintendo R&D1	Nintendo	March 21, 2003 (JP); May 23, 2003 (EU); May 26, 2003 (NA)	Yes	Yes	Yes	Yes	?
WarioWare: Twisted! • Mawaru Made in Wario ^{JP}	Intelligent Systems / Nintendo SPD	Nintendo	October 14, 2004 (JP); May 19, 2005 (NA)	Yes	Yes	No	Yes	?
Watashi no MakeSalon		Ludic	2002 (JP)	Yes	No	No	No	?
Whac-A-Mole	DC Studios	Activision Value	2005 (NA)	No	Yes	Yes	?	?
Whistle! Dai 37-kai Tokyo-to Chuugakkou Sougou Taiiku Soccer Taikai	Intense	Konami	2003 (JP)	Yes	No	No	No	?
Who Wants to Be a Millionaire? ^{NA, PAL} • Qui Veut Gagner des Millions ^{FR} • Wer Wird Millionar ^{DE} • Quien Quiere Ser Millonario ^{ES} • ¿Quiere ser millonario? 50 por 15 ^{ES} • Chi Vuol Essere Milionario ^{IT} • Weekend Miljonairs ^{NL}	Hothouse Creations	Zoo Digital Publishing	2002 (PAL)	No	No	Yes	Yes	?
Who Wants to Be a Millionaire? 2nd Edition	Hothouse Creations	Zoo Digital Publishing	2004 (PAL)	No	No	Yes	?	?
Who Wants to Be a Millionaire Junior Edition	Hothouse Creations	Zoo Digital Publishing	2005 (PAL)	No	No	Yes	?	?
The Wild Thornberrys: Chimp Chase ^{NA, PAL} • La Famille Delajungle: A la Poursuite de Darwin ^{FR} • Expedition der Stachelbeeren: Zoff im Zoo! ^{DE}	Helixe	THQ	2001 (NA)	No	Yes	Yes	?	?
The Wild Thornberrys Movie ^{NA, PAL} • La Famille Delajungle: Le Film ^{FR}	HumanSoft	THQ	2002 (NA)	No	Yes	Yes	No	?
The Wild ^{NA, PAL} • Tierisch Wild ^{DE} • Salvaje (The Wild) ^{ES}	Climax	Buena Vista Games	2006 (NA)	No	Yes	Yes	?	?
Die Wilden Fussball Kerle: Entscheidung im Teufelstopf ^{DE}	Morgen Studios	Kiddinx	2006 (PAL)	No	No	Yes	No	No
Die Wilden Fussball Kerle: Gefahr im Wilde Kerle Land ^{DE}		Kiddinx	2007 (PAL)	No	No	Yes	No	No
Wing Commander: Prophecy	Raylight Studios	Destination Software	May 23, 2003 (NA); July 17, 2003 (EU)	No	Yes	Yes	?	?
Wings	Raylight Games	Cinemaware	2002 (NA)	No	Yes	Yes	?	?
Winnie the Pooh's Rumbly Tumbly Adventure	Phoenix Studio	Ubisoft	February 8, 2005 (NA); March 1, 2005 (EU)	No	Yes	Yes	?	?
Winning Post for Game Boy Advance	Koei	Koei	March 21, 2001 (JP)	Yes	No	No	No	?
Winter Sports ^{PAL} • Winter Spiele ^{DE}	Independent Arts	East Entertainment Media	2006 (PAL)	No	No	Yes	?	?
WinX Club	Rainbow Studios	Konami	2005 (NA)	No	Yes	Yes	?	?
WinX Club: Quest for the Codex	Powerhead Games	Konami	2006 (NA)	No	Yes	Yes	?	?
Wizardry Summoner	Fupac	Media Rings	2001 (JP)	Yes	No	No	No	?
Wolfenstein 3D	id Software	BAM! Entertainment	2002 (NA)	No	Yes	Yes	?	?
Woody Woodpecker in Crazy Castle 5^{NA} • Woody Woodpecker: Crazy Castle 5 ^{PAL}	Tantalus	Kemco	2002 (JP/PAL); 2003 (NA)	Yes	Yes	Yes	?	?
Word Safari: The Friendship Totems	GXB Interactive	Tomy Corporation	2007 (NA)	No	Yes	No	No	?
World Advance Soccer: Road to Win	TOSE	Hands-On Entertainment	2001 (JP)	Yes	No	No	No	?
World Championship Poker	Sensory Sweep	Crave	November 3, 2004 (NA); March 24, 2005 (PAL)	No	Yes	Yes	?	?
World Poker Tour	Backbone Emeryville	2K Sports	October 18, 2005 (NA); January 27, 2006 (AU); March 10, 2006 (EU)	No	Yes	Yes	?	?
Wi-El: World Soccer Winning Eleven	KCET	Konami	2002 (JP)	Yes	No	No	No	?
World Tennis Stars	Awesome Developments	Ignition Entertainment	June 2, 2004 (NA/EU/PAL)	No	Yes	Yes	?	?
Worms Blast	Fluid Studios	Ubisoft	2002 (PAL)	No	No	Yes	?	?
Worms World Party	Fluid Studios	Ubisoft	2002 (NA)	No	Yes	Yes	?	?
WTA Tour Tennis ^{NA} • WTA Tour Tennis Pocket ^{JP} • Pro Tennis WTA Tour ^{PAL}	Now Production	Konami	2002 (NA)	Yes	Yes	Yes	?	?
WWE Road to WrestleMania X8	Natsume Co., Ltd.	THQ	2002 (NA)	No	Yes	Yes	?	?
WWE Survivor Series	Natsume Co., Ltd.	THQ	2004 (NA)	No	Yes	Yes	?	?
WWF Road to WrestleMania	Natsume Co., Ltd.	THQ	2001 (NA)	No	Yes	Yes	No	?
X2: Wolverine's Revenge ^{NA} • X-Men 2: Wolverine's Revenge ^{PAL} • X-Men 2: La Vengeance de Wolverine ^{FR}	Vicarious Visions	Activision	April 15, 2003 (NA); April 17, 2003 (PAL)	No	Yes	Yes	?	?
X-Bladez: Inline Skater	The Code Monkeys	Crave	April 5, 2002 (NA); March 29, 2002 (EU)	No	Yes	Yes	?	?
X-Men: Reign of Apocalypse	Digital Eclipse	Activision	2001 (NA)	No	Yes	Yes	?	?
X-Men: The Official Game ^{NA, PAL} • X-Men: Le Jeu Officiel ^{FR} • X-Men: El Videojuego Oficial ^{ES} • X-Men: Il Gioco Ufficiale ^{IT}	WayForward	Activision	2006 (NA)	No	Yes	Yes	?	?
XS Moto	DC Studios	XS Games	April 7, 2004 (NA)	No	Yes	No	No	?
XXX	Digital Eclipse	Activision	2002 (NA)	No	Yes	Yes	?	?
Yakyutuku Advance (Pro Yakyuu Team o Tsukurou! Advance)	Smilebit	SEGA	2002 (JP)	Yes	No	No	No	?
Yggdra Union	Sting Entertainment	Atlus	March 23, 2006 (JP); November 21, 2006 (NA); February 28, 2007 (EU)	Yes	Yes	Yes	?	?
Yoshi Topsy-Turvy ^{NA} • Yoshi no Banyuu Inryoku ^{JP} • Yoshi's Universal Gravitation ^{PAL}	Artoon	Nintendo	December 9, 2004 (JP); April 22, 2005 (EU); June 13, 2005 (NA)	Yes	Yes	Yes	?	?
Yoshi's Island: Super Mario Advance 3	Nintendo	Nintendo	September 20, 2002 (JP); September 24, 2002 (NA); October 11, 2002 (EU)	Yes	Yes	Yes	Yes	?
Youkaidou	Fuuki Co., Ltd.	Fuuki Co., Ltd.	2002 (JP)	Yes	No	No	No	?
Yu Yu Hakusho: Spirit Detective	Sensory Sweep	Atari	2003 (NA)	No	Yes	Yes	?	?
Yu Yu Hakusho: Tournament Tactics	Sensory Sweep	Atari	2005 (NA)	No	Yes	Yes	?	?
Yu-Gi-Oh! 7 Trials to Glory: World Championship Tournament 2005 ^{NA} • Yu-Gi-Oh! Duel Monsters International 2 ^{JP} • Yu-Gi-Oh! Day of the Duelist: World Championship Tournament 2005 ^{PAL} • Yu-Gi-Oh! Le Jour du Duelliste: World Championship Tournament 2005 ^{FR} • Yu-Gi-Oh! Der Tag des Duellanten: World Championship Tournament 2005 ^{DE} • Yu-Gi-Oh! El Día del Duelo: World Championship Tournament 2005 ^{ES} • Yu-Gi-Oh! Il Giorno del Duello: World Championship Tournament 2005 ^{IT}	Konami	Konami	2004 (JP); 2005 (NA/PAL)	Yes	Yes	Yes	?	?
Yu-Gi-Oh! Destiny Board Traveler ^{NA, PAL} • Yu-Gi-Oh! Sugoroku no Sugoroku ^{JP}	Konami Computer Entertainment Japan	Konami	2004 (NA)	Yes	Yes	Yes	?	?
Yu-Gi-Oh! Duel Monsters 6: Expert 2	Konami	Konami	2001 (JP)	Yes	No	No	No	?
Yu-Gi-Oh! Dungeon Dice Monsters	Konami	Konami	2001 (JP); 2003 (NA/PAL)	Yes	Yes	Yes	?	?
Yu-Gi-Oh! GX: Duel Academy ^{NA, PAL} • Yu-Gi-Oh! Duel Monsters GX: Mezase Duel King! ^{JP}	Konami	Konami	2006 (NA)	Yes	Yes	Yes	?	?
Yu-Gi-Oh! Reshef of Destruction ^{NA, PAL} • Yu-Gi-Oh! Duel Monsters 8: Hametsu no Dai Jashin ^{JP} • Yu-Gi-Oh! Reshef le Destructeur ^{FR} • Yu-Gi-Oh! Reshef der Zerstörer ^{DE} • Yu-Gi-Oh! Reshef el Destructor ^{ES} • Yu-Gi-Oh! Reshef el Distruttore ^{IT}	Konami	Konami	2003 (NA)	Yes	Yes	Yes	?	?
Yu-Gi-Oh! The Eternal Duelist Soul ^{NA} • Yu-Gi-Oh! Duel Monsters 5: Expert 1 ^{JP}	Konami Computer Entertainment Japan	Konami	2001 (JP); 2002 (NA)	Yes	Yes	No	No	?
Yu-Gi-Oh! The Sacred Cards ^{NA, PAL} • Yu-Gi-Oh! Duel Monsters 7: Kettou Toshi Densetsu ^{JP} • Yu-Gi-Oh! Dungeon Les Cartes Sacrées ^{FR} • Yu-Gi-Oh! Die Heiligen Karten ^{DE} • Yu-Gi-Oh! Las Cartas Sagradas ^{ES} • Yu-Gi-Oh! Le Carte Leggendarie ^{IT} • Yu-Gi-Oh! The Sacred Cards ^{NE}	Konami	Konami	2002 (NA)	Yes	Yes	Yes	?	?
Yu-Gi-Oh! Ultimate Masters: World Championship Tournament 2006 ^{NA} • Yu-Gi-Oh! Ultimate Masters Edition - World Championship Tournament 2006 ^{PAL} • Yu-Gi-Oh! Duel Monsters Expert 2006 ^{JP}	Konami	Konami	2006 (NA)	Yes	Yes	Yes	?	?
Yu-Gi-Oh! World Championship Tournament 2004 ^{NA, PAL} • Yu-Gi-Oh! Duel Monsters Expert 3 ^{JP}	Konami	Konami	2004 (NA)	Yes	Yes	Yes	?	?
Yu-Gi-Oh! Worldwide Edition: Stairway to the Destined Duel	KCEJ	Konami	2003 (NA)	Yes	Yes	Yes	?	?
Yuushun Rhapsody	TOSE	Capcom	2001 (JP)	Yes	No	No	No	?
Yuujou no Victory Goal 4v4 Arashi: Get the Goal!	Konami	Konami	2001 (JP)	Yes	No	No	No	?
Yuurei Yashiki No Nijuuyon Jikan	Global A	Global A	2002 (JP)	Yes	No	No	No	?
Zapper: One Wicked Cricket	Atomic Planet	Infogrames	November 5, 2002 (NA); March 14, 2003 (PAL)	No	Yes	Yes	?	?
Zen-Nippon Shounen Soccer Taikai 2: Mezase Nippon Ichi!	Boom	Success	2002 (JP)	Yes	No	No	No	?
Zero One	Fuuki Co., Ltd.	Fuuki Co., Ltd.	2003 (JP)	Yes	No	No	No	?
Zero One SP	Fuuki Co., Ltd.	Fuuki Co., Ltd.	2004 (JP)	Yes	No	No	No	?
Zettai Zetsumei Dangerous Jiisan: Shijou Saikyou no Dogeza	Rokumendo	Kids Station	2003 (JP)	Yes	No	No	No	?
Zettai Zetsumei Dangerous Jiisan 2: Naki no Ikkai	Rokumendo	Kids Station	2004 (JP)	Yes	No	No	No	?
Zettai Zetsumei Dangerous Jiisan 3: Hateshinaki Mamonogatari	Rokumendo	Kids Station	2004 (JP)	Yes	No	No	No	?
Zettai Zetsumei Dangerous Jiisan Tsuu: Ikari no Oshioki Blues	Rokumendo	Kids Station	2004 (JP)	Yes	No	No	No	?
Zidane: Football Generation 2002	Aqua Pacific	Cryo Interactive	2002 (PAL)	No	No	Yes	?	?
Zoey 101	Barking Lizards	THQ	2007 (NA)	No	Yes	Yes	?	?
Zoids Legacy ^{NA} • Zoids Saga II ^{JP}	Amedio	Atari SA	2004 (NA)	Yes	Yes	No	No	?
Zoids Saga	Amedio	Tomy Corporation	2001 (JP)	Yes	No	No	No	?
Zoids Saga: Fuzors	Amedio	Tomy Corporation	2004 (JP)	Yes	No	No	No	?
Zone of the Enders: The Fist of Mars ^{NA, PAL} • Zone of the Enders: 2173 Testament ^{JP}	Sunrise Interactive	Konami	2001 (NA)	Yes	Yes	Yes	?	?
ZooCube	PuzzleKings, Graphic State	Acclaim Entertainment	2002 (JP)	Yes	Yes	Yes	?	?
Zooo: Action Puzzle Game ^{PAL} • Minna no Soft Series: Zooo ^{JP}	Buddiez, Inc.	Success ^{JP} Ignition Entertainment ^{PAL}	2003 (JP); 2005 (PAL)	Yes	No	Yes	?	?

== Aftermarket releases ==
List of Game Boy Advance games
Title(s)	Developer(s)	Publisher(s)	Release date(s)	Region(s) released
Kien	AgeOfGames	Incube8	June 14, 2024	NA
Goodboy Galaxy	Goodboy Galaxy Ltd.	Goodboy Galaxy Ltd.	October 25, 2024	
Night Trap	Screaming Villains	Limited Run Games	June 2024	NA
Xeno Crisis	Bitmap Bureau	Bitmap Bureau	November 8, 2024	
Shantae Advance: Risky Revolution	WayForward	Limited Run Games	April 21, 2025	NA
Sigma Star Saga DX	WayForward	Limited Run Games	March 2026	NA

== See also ==
- Game Boy Advance
- Game Boy Advance SP
- Game Boy Micro
- Nintendo DS
- List of best-selling Game Boy Advance games
- List of cancelled Game Boy Advance games
