= List of Power Rangers video games =

Power Rangers
- Developers: Natsume; Banpresto; Nova; CyberFlix; SIMS Co., Ltd.; Tom Create; Pixel; KAZe; Mass Media Inc.; Climax Studios; Red Sky Interactive; Vicarious Visions; Climax Studios; A2M; Handheld Games; Bamtang; nWay Games; Nexon; Digital Eclipse
- Publishers: Bandai; Sega; THQ; Disney Interactive Studios; Bandai Namco Entertainment; Lionsgate Games; Electronic Arts; Hasbro Retro Arcade
- Platforms: Sega Genesis, Super Nintendo Entertainment System, Game Boy, Game Gear, Sega CD, PlayStation, Game Boy Color, Macintosh, Apple Pippin, Nintendo 64, Microsoft Windows, Game Boy Advance, GameCube, PlayStation 2, Nintendo DS, Wii, Xbox 360, Nintendo 3DS, PlayStation 4, Xbox One, Nintendo Switch
- First release: Mighty Morphin Power Rangers; September 1994
- Latest release: Mighty Morphin Power Rangers: Rita's Rewind; December 10, 2024
- Parent series: Power Rangers

The following is a list of video games based on the American media franchise Power Rangers. The games have been primarily licensed to be published under Bandai, THQ, Disney Interactive, Bandai Namco Entertainment, Lionsgate Games and Atari.

== List of games ==
Release date	Title	Developers	Publishers	Platforms
1994	Mighty Morphin Power Rangers	Natsume, Banpresto, Nova, Sims, Tom Create, Pixel	Bandai, Sega	Sega Genesis: US: November 1994; EU: 1994; Super NES: US: November 23, 1994; EU: November, 1994; JP: November 25, 1995; Game Boy: US: August 1994; EU: 1994; Game Gear: US: 1994; EU: 1994; Sega CD: US: 1995; EU: 1995
1995	Mighty Morphin Power Rangers: The Movie	Natsume, Banpresto, Sims, Tom Create	Bandai, Sega	Sega Genesis: US: July 1995; EU: December 8, 1995; Super NES: US: July 1995; EU: 1995; Game Boy: US: August 1994; Game Gear: US: 1994; EU: 1995
1995	Mighty Morphin Power Rangers: The Fighting Edition	Natsume	Bandai	Super Nintendo Entertainment System
1996	Power Rangers Zeo: Battle Racers	Natsume	Bandai	Super Nintendo Entertainment System
1996	Power Rangers Zeo: Full Tilt Battle Pinball	Kaze	Bandai	PlayStation
1996	Power Rangers Zeo vs. The Machine Empire	CyberFlix	Bandai	Microsoft Windows, Macintosh, Bandai Pippin
2000	Power Rangers Lightspeed Rescue	Mass Media Inc., Climax Studios, Natsume, Red Sky Interactive	THQ, Bandai America, Fox Kids	Game Boy Color, Macintosh, Nintendo 64, PlayStation, Microsoft Windows
2001	Power Rangers Time Force	Natsume, Vicarious Visions, Climax Studios	THQ	Game Boy Color, Game Boy Advance, PlayStation, Microsoft Windows
2002	Power Rangers Wild Force	Natsume	THQ	Game Boy Advance
2003	Power Rangers Ninja Storm	Natsume	THQ	Game Boy Advance, Microsoft Windows
2004	Power Rangers Dino Thunder	Pacific Coast Power & Light	THQ	Game Boy Advance, GameCube, PlayStation 2
2005	Power Rangers S.P.D.	Natsume	THQ	Game Boy Advance
2007	Power Rangers: Super Legends	A2M, Handheld Games	Disney Interactive Studios	Nintendo DS, PlayStation 2, Microsoft Windows
2011	Power Rangers Samurai	Inti Creates	Bandai Namco	Wii, Nintendo DS
2012	Power Rangers Super Samurai	Digifloyd	Bandai Namco	Xbox 360
2013	Power Rangers Megaforce	Aspect	Bandai Namco	Nintendo 3DS
2014	Power Rangers Super Megaforce	7thChord	Bandai Namco	Nintendo 3DS
2015	Power Rangers Dash	MoveGames	MoveGames	iOS, Android
2015	Power Rangers Unite	Funtactix	Funtactix	iOS, Android
2015	Power Rangers Dino Charge Rumble	StoryToys	StoryToys	iOS, Android
2017	Mighty Morphin Power Rangers: Mega Battle	Bamtang	Bandai Namco Entertainment	PlayStation 4, Xbox One
2017	Power Rangers: Legacy Wars	nWay Games	nWay Games	iOS, Android
2018	Power Rangers: All Stars	Nexon, MoveGames, Daewon Media	Nexon	iOS, Android
2019	Power Rangers: Battle for the Grid	nWay Games	nWay, Maximum Games, Limited Run Games, Lionsgate Games	PlayStation 4, Xbox One, Nintendo Switch, PC, Stadia.
2022	Power Rangers Morphin Legends	nWay Games	nWay Games	iOS, Android
2024	Power Rangers Mighty Force	East Side Games Studio, Mighty Kingdom	East Side Games	iOS, Android
2024	Mighty Morphin Power Rangers: Rita's Rewind	Digital Eclipse	Hasbro Retro Arcade, Atari	PC, PlayStation 4, Xbox One, Nintendo Switch, PlayStation 5, Xbox Series

Additionally, the 2015 indie tactical RPG Chroma Squad is inspired by Power Rangers.

=== Crossover appearances ===
In June 2024, the Mighty Morphin Power Rangers appeared in Ark: Survival Ascended through a collaboration content pack. The ARK x Power Rangers kit included Ranger character skins, dinosaur skins resembling Dinozords, and other themed items. A second wave of content released in February 2025 added additional skins for the Green Ranger, White Ranger, Lord Zedd, and Rita Repulsa, along with creature skins for Zords such as the White Tigerzord and Megazord.

In August 2025, characters from Mighty Morphin Power Rangers were featured in a crossover event in Fortnite Battle Royale, including skins for the Red, Black, Blue, Yellow, and Pink Rangers, plus the Green Ranger (with White Ranger as an alternate style) and villain Lord Zedd, along with a Dino Megazord item.
