= Gundam: Battle Assault 2 =

2002 video game

- Developer: Natsume Co., Ltd.
- Publishers: NA/PAL: Bandai; JP: D3 Publisher
- Director: Mitsuo Matsumoto
- Producers: Hirofumi Inagaki; Takashi Aoyama
- Designers: Hiroshi Inagaki; Kunio Suzuki; Noriyasu Nakade
- Programmers: Hirohisa Ohta; Kazuhito Yamada; Seiji Noda
- Composer: Hiroyuki Iwatsuki
- Series: Gundam: Battle Assault
- Platform: PlayStation
- Release: NA: July 18, 2002; JP: October 10, 2002; EU: November 29, 2002
- Genres: Fighting; Mecha Sci Fi
- Modes: Single-player, multiplayer

Gundam: Battle Assault 2 (Note: Also known as Simple Characters 2000 Series Vol. 12: Mobile Fighter G Gundam - The Battle (Japanese: SIMPLEキャラクター2000シリーズ VOL.12: 機動武闘伝Gガンダム THE バトル, Hepburn: SIMPLE Kyarakutā 2000 Shirīzu VOL. 12: Kidō Butō-den Jī Gandamu - THE Batoru) and Simple Characters 2000 Series Vol. 13: New Mobile Report Gundam Wing - The Battle (Japanese: SIMPLEキャラクター2000シリーズ VOL.13: 新機動戦記ガンダムW THE バトル, Hepburn: SIMPLE Kyarakutā 2000 Shirīzu VOL. 13: Shin Kidō Senki Gandamu W - THE Batoru) in Japan.) is a 2002 fighting video game developed by Natsume Co., Ltd. for the PlayStation. Based on the Gundam franchise, it is a follow-up to Gundam: Battle Assault (1998). The story is divided into three storylines following a pilot from Mobile Fighter G Gundam, Mobile Suit Gundam Wing and Mobile Suit Gundam. Its gameplay consists of one-on-one fights, with a main six-button configuration, featuring special moves and two playable modes, while players can select any available mech to battle against enemies in story mode.

Gundam: Battle Assault 2 was developed for the North American audience by most of the same team at Natsume who previously worked on Gundam Wing: Endless Duel (1996) for Super Famicom and Battle Assault (1998) for PlayStation to build anticipation for Mobile Fighter G Gundam, which began airing on Cartoon Network in the United States via Toonami after Gundam Wing ended its run. The game was eventually released in Japan by D3 Publisher as part of the Simple Characters 2000 Series of budget-priced PlayStation games (as The Battle), split into two separate games: one focusing on G Gundam and the other on Gundam Wing.

Gundam: Battle Assault 2 was met with positive reception from critics. The game sold approximately 241,276 copies combined during its lifespan in Japan.

== Gameplay ==
Gameplay screenshot showcasing a match between Treize Khushrenada (piloting the OZ-13MS Gundam Epyon) and Amuro Ray (piloting the Nu Gundam).

Gundam: Battle Assault 2 is a fighting game similar to Gundam: Battle Assault set in the Mobile Fighter G Gundam, Mobile Suit Gundam Wing and Mobile Suit Gundam storylines. The player fights against other opponents in one-on-one matches and the fighter who manages to deplete the health bar of the opponent wins the first bout. The first to win two bouts becomes the winner of the match. The game features five modes of play (Versus, Time Attacks, Survival and Street), as well as a roster of 30 playable characters and their respective mobile suits. "Street Mode" acts as a replacement for story mode, in which the player can select from a total of eight mobile suits and very loosely follow the events of the One Year War, the 13th Gundam Fight, and the Endless Waltz OVA. The gameplay system from Battle Assault was refined in the sequel.

The boost gauge limits how much a mobile suit mech can fly. Each press of the thrust button costs one boost bar and when the gauge is depleted, players must wait for it to recharge before boosting again. With some exceptions, each mobile suit can also activate a flight mode that allows it to fly in any direction and not get fazed by attacks as long as it doesn't overheat or the boost gauge depletes. The main projectile attacks costs ammo, an amount proportional to the projectile's power. If a mobile suit runs out of ammo, it cannot use that move for the rest of the match but alternate projectile special attacks do not need ammunition. Dodging and using beam barriers no longer drains health but uses the boost gauge instead. Every mobile suit has a "Mega Special Attack" super move that can be used up to three times.

== Development and release ==
Gundam: Battle Assault 2 was developed for the North American audience by most of the same team at Natsume Co., Ltd. who previously worked on Gundam Wing: Endless Duel (1996) for Super Famicom and Battle Assault (1998) for PlayStation to build anticipation for Mobile Fighter G Gundam, which began airing on Cartoon Network in the United States via Toonami after Mobile Suit Gundam Wing ended its run. Mitsuo Matsumoto lead its development as director alongside co-producers Hirofumi Inagaki and Takashi Aoyama. Hirohisa Ohta, Kazuhito Yamada, Seiji Noda and Toshiyasu Miyabe served as co-programmers, while Hiroshi Inagaki, Kunio Suzuki, Noriyasu Nakade, Shunichi Taniguchi and Takashi Shinpo acted as co-designers. The soundtrack was composed by Hiroyuki Iwatsuki. Other people collaborated in its development as well.

Gundam: Battle Assault 2 was first released in North America by Bandai on July 18, 2002, in Japan by D3 Publisher on October 10, 2002, and again by Bandai in Europe on November 29, 2002. Early versions incorrectly spell "Gundam" as "Gundum" on the spine of the game's case. The game was eventually released in Japan on October 10, 2002, as part of Bandai's Simple Characters 2000 Series (as The Battle) of budget-priced PlayStation games (the series was published by D3 Publisher instead of Bandai themselves), split into two separate games: one focusing on G Gundam and the other on Gundam Wing. One of the differences with the two split versions of the game (other than that Burning Gundam and Dark Gundam's names were restored to their original names, God Gundam and Devil Gundam respectively) was that the Psycho Gundam Mk. III retained its original pilot from the Gundam: The Battle Master games. The title was also released in PAL regions in November 2002, with distribution handled by Infogrames.

== Reception ==
Reception

Aggregate scores
Aggregator	Score
GameRankings	70%
Metacritic	80/100

Review scores
Publication	Score
GameZone	8.0/10
Jeuxvideo.com	12/20
Push Square	7/10
PlayStation Illustrated	80%

Gundam: Battle Assault 2 received "generally favorable reviews" according to review aggregator Metacritic. The game holds a 70.57% rating based on seven reviews at GameRankings. According to Famitsu, both Kidō Butōden G Gundam - The Battle and Shin Kidō Senki Gundam W - The Battle sold over 38.851 and 40.193 copies respectively in their first week on the Japanese market. Both titles sold approximately 114.198 and 127.078 copies respectively during their lifetime in Japan.

GameZone's Scott Kuvin commended its slow-paced gameplay, colorful hand-drawn graphics, sound design, concept and multiplayer but criticized the lack of additional two-player modes and music. Jeuxvideo.com's Benoît Morel criticized its AI for being limited, longevity, scenario and gameplay but gave positive remarks to the audiovisual presentation. PlayStation Illustrated's Matt Paddock gave it an overall positive outlook. José Ángel Ciudad of Spanish magazine GamesTech praised Gundam: Battle Assault 2 for its large character sprites and near-lack of loading times. In a retrospective outlook, Push Square's Robert Ramsey regarded it as an improvement to Gundam: Battle Assault and an overlooked fighting game on PlayStation due to its unique feel, style and character roster but noted that it lacked the depth of the more established fighting franchises.
