= Gundam: Battle Assault (video game) =

1998 video game

- Developer: Natsume Co., Ltd.
- Publisher: Bandai
- Director: Mitsuo Matsumoto
- Producers: Kosak Kawamoto; Norihiko Ushimura
- Designers: Kunio Suzuki; Shunichi Taniguchi
- Programmers: Hiromichi Komuro; Hiroyuki Iwatsuki; Toshiyasu Miyabe
- Artists: Atsushi Shigeta; Kunio Ōkawara
- Composer: Nobuo Ito
- Series: Gundam; Gundam: Battle Assault
- Platform: PlayStation
- Release: JP: March 12, 1998; NA: November 6, 2000; UK: December 7, 2001
- Genres: Fighting; Mecha Sci-fi
- Modes: Single-player, multiplayer

Gundam: Battle Assault (Note: Also known as Gundam: The Battle Master 2 (Japanese: ガンダム・ザ・バトルマスター2, Hepburn: Gandamu: Za Batoru Masutā 2) in Japan.) is a 1998 fighting video game developed by Natsume Co., Ltd. and published by Bandai for the PlayStation. Based on the Gundam franchise, it is a follow-up to Gundam: The Battle Master (1997), which was released only in Japan. The plot involves Heero Yuy, protagonist of Mobile Suit Gundam Wing and pilot of the XXXG-01W Wing Gundam, on a mission to destroy remaining enemy Mobile Suits under command of Treize Khushrenada to stop a war from starting. Its gameplay consists of one-on-one fights, with a main six-button configuration, featuring special moves and two playable modes, while players can select any available mech to battle against enemies in story mode.

Gundam: Battle Assault was developed by most of the same team at Natsume Co., Ltd. who previously worked on Shin Kidō Senki Gundam Wing: Endless Duel (1996) for Super Famicom and The Battle Master (1997) for PlayStation. The game was first released in Japan as Gundam: The Battle Master 2 and featured original characters and plot, revolving around Mobile Suit bounty hunter Gloria stumbling upon an amnesiac child called Pixie, who is the subject of attacks from enemies. When Gundam Wing began airing on Cartoon Network in the United States, Bandai localized The Battle Master 2 as Battle Assault for English-speaking audiences, replacing the original cast with characters from other Gundam series while featuring modified dialogue and plot for its story mode, among other changes. The localized version was later released in Japan.

Gundam: Battle Assault was met with mixed reception from critics; common criticism were towards the presentation, slow-paced gameplay, story mode and lack of replay value, with most reviewers feeling mixed in regards to the audio, although it received praise for its visuals and character roster due to the large mech sprites and their animations. The game sold approximately 33,092 copies combined during its lifespan in Japan. A follow-up, Gundam: Battle Assault 2, was released for the PlayStation in 2002.

== Gameplay ==
Gameplay screenshot showcasing a match between Heero Yuy (piloting the Wing Gundam) and Kamille Bidan (piloting the Z-Gundam).

Gundam: Battle Assault is a fighting game similar to Gundam: The Battle Master set in the Mobile Suit Gundam Wing storyline. It features two modes: Story and Versus. The plot involves Heero Yuy, protagonist of Gundam Wing and pilot of the XXXG-01W Wing Gundam, on a mission to destroy remaining enemy Mobile Suits under command of Treize Khushrenada to stop a war from starting, with players being able to select from nine mechs to battle against enemies in story mode. The gameplay system from The Battle Master was changed to resemble a more traditional fighting title; the temperature and special gauges were replaced with a standard health bar (of which each mobile suit has three), a boost gauge and an ammo counter. The shoot and weapon functions are now special moves, being replaced with second strength punch and kick buttons. The health bars works similarly to the temperature bar but when a health bar is empty, the mech will overheat and be knocked down, and overheats leads to a loss.

The boost gauge now limits how much a mobile suit mech can fly, whereas players could fly indefinitely in The Battle Master. Each press of the thrust button costs one boost bar and when the gauge is depleted, players must wait for it to recharge before boosting again. With the exception of Neue Ziel, each mobile suit can also activate a flight mode that allows it to fly in any direction and not get fazed by attacks as long as it doesn't overheat or the boost gauge depletes. The main projectile attacks costs ammo, an amount proportional to the projectile's power. If a mobile suit runs out of ammo, it cannot use that move for the rest of the match but alternate projectile special attacks do not need ammunition. Projectile attacks are no longer unblockable but melee weapons now are. Beam barriers can now block melee weapons (since those are now unblockable) but dodging or using beam barriers now drains health. Super moves are also re-introduced, with almost every mobile suit now possessing a super move that can be used up to three times.

== Development and release ==
Screenshot of Gundam: The Battle Master 2 prior to localization featuring Gloria (piloting Sazabi) and Lloyd Nichols (piloting (Zaku II), original characters before its cast was replaced with those from other Gundam series.

Gundam: Battle Assault was developed by most of the same team at Natsume Co., Ltd. who previously worked on Shin Kidō Senki Gundam Wing: Endless Duel (1996) for Super Famicom and The Battle Master (1997) for PlayStation. Mitsuo Matsumoto lead its development as chief director alongside co-producers Kosak Kawamoto and Norihiko Ushimura. Hiromichi Komuro, Hiroyuki Iwatsuki and Toshiyasu Miyabe served as co-programmers of the game, while Shunichi Taniguchi and Kunio Suzuki acted as co-designers. Atsushi Shigeta was responsible for the character designs, with Kunio Ōkawara acting as designer of the Psycho Gundam MK-III. The soundtrack was composed by Nobuo Ito. Other people collaborated in its development as well. The title makes use of multi-limbed sprites that are individually animated instead of hand-drawn animation, giving the mechs a marionette-like aspect.

Gundam: Battle Assault was first released in Japan as Gundam: The Battle Master 2 on March 12, 1998, featuring an original cast of characters and a plot revolving around Mobile Suit bounty hunter Gloria stumbling upon an amnesiac child called Pixie, who is the subject of attacks from enemies. When Mobile Suit Gundam Wing began airing on Cartoon Network in the United States via Toonami, Bandai localized The Battle Master 2 as Battle Assault for English-speaking audiences on November 6, 2000. The localization replaced the original cast with characters from other Gundam series and featured modified dialogue for its story mode, which was now tied to Gundam Wing. The localization also removed the Hamma Hamma mobile suit from the roster and replaced it with the Wing Gundam, though this new mech is a Zeta Gundam with a different visual design. The localized version was later released in Japan on April 26, 2001. The game was also released in the United Kingdom on December 7, 2001.

== Reception ==
Reception

Aggregate scores
Aggregator	Score
GameRankings	56%
Metacritic	61/100

Review scores
Publication	Score
AllGame	2/5
Electronic Gaming Monthly	3/10
EP Daily	2/10
Famitsu	24/40
GameSpot	5.6/10
IGN	7.4/10
Jeuxvideo.com	9/20
Official U.S. PlayStation Magazine	3/5
PlayStation: The Official Magazine	4/10
Push Square	5/10
Dengeki PlayStation	75/100, 90/100

Gundam: Battle Assault received "mixed" reviews according to review aggregator Metacritic. In Japan, Famitsu gave it a score of 24 out of 40.

According to the same magazine, Battle Assault sold over 24,735 units in its first week on the Japanese market. The title sold approximately 33,092 units during its lifetime in Japan.

IGN's David Smith commended the character roster, gameplay, lack of slowdown, two-dimensional visuals and sound effects but noted that its pacing felt slow and criticized the inability to choose between characters in story mode and uninspiring music, stating that Gundam: Battle Assault "isn't a game for serious fighter fans, but it's definitely one for Gundam fans, Wing or otherwise." GameSpot's Jeff Gerstmann gave positive remarks to the large size of each mech, fluid movement and certain aspect of the audio design but criticized the game's uninteresting story mode. The Electric Playground's James Tapia criticized the slow-paced gameplay for its lack of advanced fighting game mechanics and disjointed controls but gave positive comments to the visuals. Nevertheless, Tapia stated that "the North American audience would have been better served with a retooling of the Super Famicom (Super NES) classic Gundam Wing - Endless Duel". AllGame's Jon Thompson praised the varied character roster and animations but criticized the minimalist gameplay mechanics, audio design and lackluster presentation of Battle Assault.

PSM commended the colorful graphics and sprite animations but criticized the game's poor execution, stating that "Since Gundam is one of the best anime series ever, it's unfortunate that this game isn't very good." Jeuxvideo.com's Valérie Précigout criticized the audiovisual presentation, slow gameplay, lack of replay value and story mode. MAN!AC's David Mohr panned the title's pacing, limited and pixelated character animations, collision detection issues, story mode and two-player mode. In contrast, José Ángel Ciudad of Spanish magazine GamesTech praised Gundam: Battle Assault for its large character sprites and near-lack of loading times. MeriStation's Daniel Delgado García felt mixed in regards to audio and criticized Battle Assault's presentation, slow pacing, lack of replay value and inability to select another game mode without resetting the PlayStation console but praised the large mechs and character roster. In a retrospective outlook, Push Square's Robert Ramsey criticized the combat system, small arena sizes and lack of content but commended the game's style and found its soundtrack to be enjoyable.

The game was nominated for the "Biggest Disappointment" award at The Electric Playground's Blister Awards 2000, which went to Daikatana.
