= Abadox =

1989 video game

Abadox: The Deadly Inner War
- North American cover art
- Developer: Natsume
- Publishers: JP: Natsume; NA: Milton Bradley
- Director: Atsushi Okazaki
- Producers: Takashi Nagai; Tadashi Makimura
- Programmers: Kimiya Sasaki; Seiichi Tajima; Kōichi Dekune
- Artist: Hidenobu Takahashi
- Composer: Kiyohiro Sada
- Platform: Nintendo Entertainment System
- Release: JP: December 15, 1989; NA: March 1990
- Genre: Scrolling shooter
- Mode: Single-player

Abadox: The Deadly Inner War (アバドックス, Abadokkusu) is a horizontally scrolling shooter for the Nintendo Entertainment System published in Japan in 1989 by Natsume and North America in 1990 by Milton Bradley Company. It features gameplay in the vein of Gradius and R-Type, in which the player must shoot hordes of enemies while collecting power-ups to upgrade their ship. The plot revolves around the player character Nazal attempting to rescue the "beautiful Princess Maria" from being held within the "nightmarish body" of the game's antagonist Parasitis. The game has often been noted by critics for its difficulty, with the player being instantly killed by a single enemy projectile.

== Plot ==
In the year 5012, the planet Abadox is eaten by a giant alien organism known as Parasitis. Having consumed Abadox, the alien takes the form of the planet and seeks to devour other planets. The galactic military launches an attack but is destroyed by Parasitis who goes on to devour the hospital ship carrying Princess Maria. Second Lieutenant Nazal, the only surviving fighter of the galactic fleet, attempts to enter Parasitis's body and rescue Maria before it is too late.

== Gameplay ==
Gameplay screenshot from first level

The gameplay largely follows the conventions of side-scrolling shooters of the time. The player shoots down various enemies, almost all of which look like various internal organs (brains, eyes and even cilia). The player can also pick weapons and power-ups. Power-ups include speed boosters, increased firepower, homing missiles and shields similar to the "Option" featured in Gradius. For weapons, the player starts with the normal single shot, but can upgrade to a 3-way gun, a spread fire gun, a laser and a hoop-like weapon. However, like most shooters, if the player is killed, all of the upgrades will be lost and the player will have to restart from the last checkpoint. In some cases, if the player dies, they may have to navigate through enemy fire with slow speed, which could prove more difficult than ever.

Another aspect of Abadox that sets the game off from other shooters is the second, fourth and sixth stages. The play style changes from a side-scrolling perspective to a vertical one, but instead of scrolling upwards like a typical vertical shooter, the stage scrolls downward. The final stage involves an escape sequence where the player must navigate out of the alien's rectal cavity before the alien implodes. This falls in suit with a Konami title, Life Force, to which Abadox bears a striking resemblance.

== Audio ==
The music and sound effects for Abadox were produced by Kiyohiro Sada (credited as K. Sada), who composed music for several NES games from Konami, such as Contra, Blades of Steel and Rush'n Attack.

== Reception ==
Reception

Review score
Publication	Score
Electronic Gaming Monthly	7/10, 6/10, 6/10, 7/10

Critics have generally looked at Abadox favorably for its design, but negatively for its high level of difficulty.

Allgame gave the game a rating of 3 stars out of a possible 5.

== See also ==
- S.C.A.T.: Special Cybernetic Attack Team
