= Touhouken Bunroku =

1988 video game

Tōhō Kenbun Roku
- Developer: Natsume
- Publisher: Natsume
- Programmer: Captain Tsubohachi
- Artist: Keiichi Ōta
- Writers: Ultra Kanshai; Kohan
- Composer: Hana Yamucha
- Platform: Family Computer
- Release: JP: November 10, 1988
- Genres: Adventure, interactive fiction
- Mode: Single-player

Touhouken Bunroku (Japanese: 東方見文録, Hepburn: Tōhōken Bunroku) is a text-based adventure game, released in 1988 by developer Natsume for the Family Computer. It centers on the titular character who was researching spatiotemporal travel via particle fission along the Silk Road to run Japan's best general store. After traveling back to Venice in 1275, Bunroku encounters his idol Marco Polo, and the two embark on a journey together to Japan, known as the Country of Gold.

The title of the game is a play on 東方見聞録 (The Travels of Marco Polo) with alters the fourth character so as to make the title nonsensical. The game is noted for its dark humour and absurdist textuality, gaining a cult following.

== Plot ==
Touhouken Bunroku is a fourth-year student in the Department of Chrono-Travel Studies at Southeast Asia University's College of Historical Engineering, specializing in spatiotemporal travel via particle fission along the Silk Road. Born into a family of merchants, Bunroku dreams of opening Japan's greatest general store in Daikanyama.

Inspired by Marco Polo's The Travels of Marco Polo, which describes Japan as "the Country of Gold", Bunroku resolves to fund his dream by using a self-built time machine. He packs his backpack with bargain-bin daily goods bought in Akihabara and embarks on a "graduation trip" to Venice in 1275, hoping to meet his idol Marco Polo and join his expedition. However, he arrives precisely as Marco is departing, and through a twist of fate and a minor accident, Bunroku ends up joining Marco's historic journey.

Their perilous odyssey spans years and continents: encounters with Father Teobaldo who later become Pope, battles against the Old Man of the Mountain in Persia, conflicts over spinel in Badakhshan, and a vengeful showdown with Ahmad, the Yuan Dynasty noble who plots to assassinate Kublai Khan and eliminate Marco's crew in Xanadu. After six grueling years, Bunroku and Marco finally reach Dadu (the Yuan capital), where they secure passage on a Mongol armada bound for Japan.

Yet upon arrival, Bunroku grows suspicious when the Kamikaze, a historical typhoon that famously repelled Mongol invasions, fails to materialize. Remotely overloading his time machine, he artificially triggers a "kamikaze" storm. However, this act summons not a natural disaster but a squadron of Shinpū Tokubetsu Kōgekitai from the future, who obliterate the Mongol fleet in an instant. Marco perishes in the crossfire.

Grief-stricken and adrift, Bunroku loses consciousness and washes ashore in a surreal landscape resembling a distorted blend of Nara, Kyoto, and Mount Fuji. This is the Chrono Complex, a prison for "temporal violators" who meddle with time. Trapped among deranged inmates and unable to return to his era, Bunroku descends into madness, endlessly calling for his mother as the story closes in bleak despair.

== Censorship ==
In the game's original version, Marco’s death by a stray bullet was rendered as a graphically explicit depiction of his head exploding, paired with detailed textual narration of the scene. The early build also included sexually suggestive material and instances of discriminatory language. All these content was censored prior to the official release, presumably due to concerns over ethical controversies they might provoke.

== Reception ==
Reception

Review scores
Publication	Score
Famitsu	27/40
Marukatsu Famicom	29/50
Family Computer Magazine	17.36/30
Bad Taste Game Journey	Positive
GAMESIDE	Positive

Famitsu reviewers gave it a total of 27 points out of 40. Marukatsu Famicom awarded it individual scores of 4, 6, 7, 6, 6, summing to 29/50. According to Family Computer Magazine's reader-polled game report cards, the game was rated 17.36/30. It described the game as "a laughingly absurd world", believing its greatest appeal lies in its "wildly unpredictable story—a deliberate contrast to conventional game systems. Every character’s graphics and dialogue are guaranteed to provoke roaring laughter. Highly recommended for adventure fans tired of the usual 'murder mystery investigations.'"

The gaming book Bad Taste Game Journey said this game has "exists far beyond the realm of self-proclaimed 'absurdist cult games'", and believed "this exclusive, user-hostile design philosophy which rooted in a Yumeno Kyūsaku esque worldview could only have been realized in an era when games were still treated as 'artistic works' rather than mere products."

Comparing the game to Idol Hakkenden, gaming magazine GAMESIDE believed the two games cemented Natsume’s reputation as the king of quirky oddities. GAMESIDE pointed every characters except Marco are in full-blown comedy mode, and praised its animation-heavy presentation scores above average. Despite its unhinged narrative, the "Zapping System" which let players switch characters mid-scene showing "technical polish that shouldn’t be underestimated."
