= Meitantei Holmes: M-Kara no Chousenjou =

1989 video game

- Cover art
- Developer: Another
- Publisher: Towa Chiki
- Series: Sherlock Holmes
- Platform: Family Computer
- Release: JP: May 1, 1989
- Genre: Modern first-person adventure
- Mode: Single-player

Meitantei Holmes: M-Kara no Chousenjou (名探偵ホームズ Ｍからの挑戦状, Meitantei Hōmuzu: M kara no Chōsenjō; lit. 'Great Detective Holmes: A Challenge from M') is a first-person adventure video game for the Family Computer that is based on the stories by Arthur Conan Doyle. It is the sequel to Sherlock Holmes: Hakushaku Reijō Yūkai Jiken (シャーロックホームズ 伯爵令嬢誘拐事件; "Sherlock Holmes: The Kidnapping of the Earl's Daughter") and Meitantei Holmes: Kiri no London Satsujin Jiken (名探偵ホームズ 霧のロンドン殺人事件; "Great Detective Holmes: A Case of Murder in London Fog"), the latter having been released on May 13, 1988. In Kiri no London Satsujin Jiken, the player takes control of Holmes and Watson in the streets of London. The player can collect clues and also shillings in order to pay for things such as a coach fare, which allows them to travel London faster. All of these video games were released exclusively in Japan.

== Gameplay ==
As the fictional detective, the player must go through places like France, Austria, and Germany to solve the mystery. Players can choose to start a new adventure or continue an old one by using a password of Japanese characters.

Players can expect challenges from Professor Moriarty, the classic nemesis of Sherlock Holmes. There are also ten other characters to interact with.
