= Trick Boarder =

2000 video game

- Developer: Act Studio
- Publisher: Natsume
- Platform: Game Boy Color
- Release: WW: 30 June 2000
- Genres: Sports, Racing
- Modes: Single-player, Multiplayer

Trick Boarder (released in Japan as Trickboarder GP) is a 2000 video game developed by Act Studio and published by Natsume for the Game Boy Color. The game is a snowboard racing video game in which player select one of eight characters to compete with other racers through nine downhill courses. Natsume adapted the engine of the game from the Game Boy Color version of Tony Hawk's Pro Skater, and showcased the game at E3 2000. Upon release, Trick Boarder received mixed to negative reviews, with criticism directed at the game's lack of variety and faulting its visual presentation and flow of gameplay.

== Gameplay ==
Races in Trick Boarder are completed from a top-down perspective.

Game modes in Trick Boarder include 'Grand Prix', which combines all nine courses in which players compete with other onscreen racers, 'Time Trials', which allows players to meet the best time on a single course, or 'Multirace' in which players can race against a single computer opponent or another human player using the Game Link Cable. Races are completed from a top-down perspective in which players aim to complete the course in the fastest time whilst avoiding obstacles. Players can collect boost power-ups or grind over rails increase their speed. Tricks can also be completed from jumps and half pipes which add points that affect a player's rank in a race.

== Reception ==
Reception

Review scores
Publication	Score
AllGame	3/5 stars
IGN	6/10
Nintendo Official Magazine	58%
Pocket Gamer	C+
Total Game Boy	55%

Trick Boarder received mixed to negative reviews from critics upon release. Craig Harris of IGN noted the game was fun for its budget price, but found the gameplay to be "mundane", citing its lack of variety beyond the race mode and still-frame animations for tricks that interrupt the flow of gameplay. Joe Ottoson of Allgame commended the game's variety of courses and tricks, but found the visual presentation to be "washed-out" and there to be little replay value once the player had completed courses. Total Game Boy critiqued the game's "glitchy graphics and terrible controls", finding the top-down perspective view of the game to be limiting and describing the "stop-start" gameplay as "frustrating". Describing the game as a "one-trick pony", Pocket Gamer noted the game was initially fun, but featured little else and had "limited replay value". Nintendo Official Magazine faulted the game for its "poor controls and boring graphics".
