= Return of the Ninja =

2001 video game

- Developer: Act Japan
- Publisher: Natsume Inc.
- Producers: Naoki Eriguchi; Hiro Maekawa
- Designer: Tarō Sasahara
- Programmers: Kunihiro Takahashi; Takanori Kuwana
- Artists: Reiko Hirota; Kōichi Mashimo; Masanori Kitsuta
- Composers: Kiyoshi Kusatsu; Yoshio Watanabe
- Platform: Game Boy Color
- Release: PAL: March 30, 2001; NA: April 28, 2001
- Genres: Platform, stealth
- Mode: Single-player

Return of the Ninja is a platform game with stealth elements developed by Act Japan and published by Natsume Inc. for the Game Boy Color in 2001 as a spiritual successor to 1990's Shadow of the Ninja.

== Gameplay ==
The player takes role of a ninja (either the male Tsukikage and or the female Saiyuri), using the D-pad to move and the buttons to jump and attack. Various special items called Shinobi Tools need be collected to master the five arts of ninjutsu (Earth, Wind, Fire, Water, and Heaven) and proceed through the game. Guards may alert the others and can be avoided. The player's rank at the end of each stage is determined by how fast the level was completed and how many times the protagonist has been spotted by human enemies, and cards can be awarded to the player.

== Reception ==
Reception

Aggregate score
Aggregator	Score
GameRankings	70%

Review scores
Publication	Score
AllGame	3/5
GamePro	4/5
Nintendo Power	3/5

Return of the Ninja received "average" reviews according to the review aggregation website GameRankings. Retro Gamer highlighted it as one of the most memorable games about Japanese warriors. Nintendo Power gave it an average review nearly four months before the game was released.
