= Ninja Gaiden Shadow =

1991 video game

- North American cover art
- Developer: Natsume Co., Ltd.
- Publisher: Tecmo
- Composer: Hiroyuki Iwatsuki
- Series: Ninja Gaiden
- Platform: Game Boy
- Release: JP: December 13, 1991; NA: December 1991; EU: 1992
- Genres: Platform, hack and slash
- Mode: Single-player

Ninja Gaiden Shadow, released in Japan as Ninja Ryūkenden GB: Matenrō Kessen (Japanese: 忍者龍剣伝GB 摩天楼決戦; literally "Legend of the Ninja Dragon Sword GB: Skyscraper Showdown") and in Europe and Australia as Shadow Warriors, is a 1991 hack and slash platform game developed by Natsume Co., Ltd. and published by Tecmo for the Game Boy. It is a prequel to the NES Ninja Gaiden trilogy.

== Plot ==
Set in a retro-futuristic version of 1985, three years before the events of the first Ninja Gaiden (NES), the player controls Ryu Hayabusa, who must save New York City from the forces of Emperor Garuda, a servant of Jaquio. Garuda's minions include the cyborg "Spider", kickboxer Gregory and his manager Jack, former military commander Colonel Allen, and the Japanese nobleman Whokisai (風鬼斎, Fūkisai).

== Gameplay ==
Screenshot of the game's First Act

Ninja Gaiden Shadow features simplified play mechanics compared to those used in the NES trilogy. In contrast to the variety of ninja arts and power-ups available in the NES games, Ryu only has a basic sword attack and a Fire Wheel attack that can be replenished for up to five uses. While Ryu cannot stick to or climb walls like in the NES games, he can hang onto railings and move underneath them like in Ninja Gaiden III: The Ancient Ship of Doom, and use both his sword attack and the Fire Wheel art while hanging onto railings. Unique to this installment, Ryu is equipped with a grappling hook that allows him to latch onto hard-to-reach railings. Like in the NES versions, Ryu can find health potions, fire wheel stocks, and extra lives by destroying item containers.

== Development ==
Ninja Gaiden Shadow was originally planned to be a Game Boy adaptation of the NES game Shadow of the Ninja. The Nagoya division of Natsume, which developed Shadow of the Ninja, also developed Ninja Gaiden Shadow.

== Reception ==
Reception

Review scores
Publication	Score
ACE	4/5
Computer and Video Games	90/100
GamePro	18/25
Joypad	87%
Video Games (DE)	62%
VideoGames & Computer Entertainment	8/10
Power Play	65%
