= Mighty Morphin Power Rangers: The Movie (video game) =

- North American box art for the SNES version
- Developers: Natsume Co., Ltd. (SNES); SIMS (Genesis, Game Gear); Tom Create (Game Boy)
- Publishers: Bandai (SNES, Game Boy); Sega (Genesis, Game Gear)
- Programmers: Genesis: Wataru Minegishi; SNES: Hirohisa Ohta; Makoto Nonogaki; Game Gear: Masaaki Akine; Game Boy: Keiki Hatakeyama
- Composers: Genesis: Hikoshi Hashimoto; SNES: Hiroyuki Iwatsuki; Haruo Ohashi; Game Gear: Satoshi Yamamoto; Game Boy: Kenichi Ōkuma; Noriyuki Iwadare; Hitoshi Sakimoto
- Series: Power Rangers
- Platforms: SNES, Genesis, Game Boy, Game Gear
- Release: SNES: NA: July 1995; EU: 1995; Sega Genesis/Mega Drive: NA: 1995; EU: December 1995
- Genres: Action, fighting, beat 'em up
- Modes: Single-player, multiplayer

Mighty Morphin Power Rangers: The Movie is the title of four different video game adaptations of the film of the same name which were released for the Super NES, Genesis, Game Boy, and Game Gear. While the games are ostensibly based on the film, they also feature characters and plot elements from the second season of the original TV series. Like the previous game versions of the original Mighty Morphin Power Rangers, none of the four versions of the movie game are ports of each other.

== Super NES ==
The first level in the SNES version

The Super NES version is a side-scrolling action game similar to the previous SNES game based on the series. The game can be played by one or two players with six available characters. Billy and Kimberly return from the previous game along with the introduction of Tommy, as the White Ranger (opposed to appearing as the Green Ranger), and three new rookie rangers, Rocky, Adam, and Aisha, who replace Jason, Zack, and Trini from the original.

The player begins each level as his or her character's civilian persona. The player can fill up a "Morphing meter" next to their life gauge by picking up thunderbolt-shaped items (whether by small ones or morphing sign bolts). These objects are dropped by enemies and can also be used to perform a special attack when the character is morphed or not. When Morphed, the Ranger gains a powered up kick as well as his or her signature weapon, the latter can be used in a special attack to deal great damage to a boss, or defeat weaker enemies and severally weakened bosses by pressing the special attack button. Once the Morphin' meter is filled, the player can press the special attack button to morph; an animated sequence begins showing the rangers morphing in a digitized video (based on the Season 2's transformation without showing the Red Ranger helmet configuring at the end). The method also occurs automatically after the player goes throughout the mission in civilian mode encountering the boss triggering the morph sequence (regardless of how much energy of the morphin' meter is filled up). A Special code made for the game can have the players begin the levels as the morphed Rangers instead of their civilian persona.

The game consists of seven levels. The player fights against Lord Zedd's Putty Patrol until reaching the end of level boss. The first five bosses are all monsters from the TV show's second season, while the sixth one is an original creation for the game. The final boss is Ivan Ooze, the film's antagonist. Unlike the first game, there are no Megazord battles in this version, although the Ninja Megazord from the film (and the show's third season) makes an appearance during the ending sequence.

Reception

Review score
Publication	Score
Electronic Gaming Monthly	7.5/10, 5.5/10, 5.5/10, 5/10

The four reviewers of Electronic Gaming Monthly considered the game a mediocre Final Fight clone which has decent graphics but suffers from a lack of variety of both moves and enemies. In contrast, GamePro commented "With better gameplay, better Ranger graphics, and two-player simultaneous action, this sequel's perfect for fanatic fans and a fun once-through for other gamers." They particularly praised the multi-plane action, the simultaneous two player mode, and the accessible difficulty and controls.

== Genesis ==
First level from the Genesis version

The Genesis version is a side-scrolling beat-'em-up that can be played by up to two players, where the player can control both the Rangers themselves and their Zords (depending on the level). The game consists of six levels, with the first two and the final one covering events from the film, whereas levels 3 to 5 are set before the events of the film and adapts key episodes from the TV show's second season ("White Light", "The Ninja Encounter", and "The Power Transfer"). The game's soundtrack, composed by Hikoshi Hashimoto, features hard rock arrangements of Ron Wasserman's original TV themes.

The game contains a total of nine rangers: Tommy, Kimberly, Billy, Rocky, Aisha, Adam, Jason, Trini, and Zack. When selecting Jason, Trini, and Zack, the voice clips of Rocky, Aisha, and Adam are heard when calling out their respective morphing command. The reason for this is because the original actors for Jason, Trini, and Zack were released from their contract after the events of the "Opposites Attract" episode of Mighty Morphin' Power Rangers. Sega and Banpresto asked for permission from Saban Entertainment to use their characters but have the three replacements use their voices instead of Jason, Trini, and Zack. There are cinematic scenes in digitized form that are abridged from the movie and some from Season 2 of the show. Lord Zedd, Goldar, the Putty Patrol, and Oozemen appear as sub-enemies. Nimrod the Scarlet Sentinel, AC, and DC are renamed in this title as Sentinel Neck, Sentinel Ear, and Sentinel Ring respectively. Players also can fight the Ecto-Morphicons using Ninja Megazord or Falcon Zord (both by 2-Player mode; Thunder Megazord and White Tigerzord in Warrior mode against the Sentinels). Bulk and Skull also appear as cameos in the game's ending.

== Game Boy ==
The Game Boy version is a single-player side-scrolling action game similar to the SNES version. The player can choose to play as any of the six rangers, who will start off each level as a Ninja Ranger. Rocky, Billy, and Tommy are the stronger characters, while Adam and the girls are more agile. By defeating enemies throughout each level, mainly Putty Patrollers, and accumulating enough Thunderbolt items to fill up the power gauge, the player can transform their character into a Power Ranger. Filling up the power gauge again while in Power Ranger mode will allow the player to perform a super attack. The game consists of six levels. The first five levels can be played in any order, while the sixth one can only be played after completing the other five.

GamePro commented in their review that "mediocre music, miniature graphics, and horrible control make this one of the worst Ranger titles to date." They particularly criticized that the levels are all similar and predictable and that without the Super Game Boy it is impossible to even differentiate between the different playable characters. The four reviewers of Electronic Gaming Monthly were divided about the game; two of them described it as "excessively lame", while the other two found it "surprisingly good", praising its length and precise controls. However, all four commented that the collision detection is poor, with attacks passing through enemies, and that the lack of any difference between the playable characters besides color is a letdown. They scored it a 6.875 out of 10.

== Game Gear ==
The Game Gear version is a competitive fighting game, like the original Game Gear "Mighty Morphin' Power Rangers" game, with the same gameplay format and game modes. One change that has been made from the previous game is the addition of a thunderbolt-shaped power indicator next to the life gauge that gradually fills up during the course of battle until it begins to flash; during such instances, the player can perform a super move in addition to the standard special moves. The Game Gear version's soundtrack is made up of mostly midi versions of music from the series and Mighty Morphin Power Rangers the Album: A Rock Adventure.

The Story Mode consists of six levels, with the first three levels being based on episodes from the second season of the TV show, and the remaining three being based on the movie. In the first three levels, the player fights the first segment as one of the six Power Rangers from the TV show as they fight a series of Putty Patrollers until confronting the level boss. The second segment consists of a giant monster battle between the Thunder Megazord and the level boss. Level four is exclusively a Ranger fight against Ivan's Ooze men, while the final two are giant monster battles where the player controls the Ninja Mega Falconzord.

Scary Larry of GamePro opened his review joking about the Power Rangers IP, but quickly stating that "fans of the series will love this cart". He generally regarded the game well, with specific compliments going to the graphics, and mentioned that the audio was "tame and repetitious, but not as annoying as other Game Gear carts". The game received a 4.0 for Graphics, a 4.0 for Sound, a 3.5 for Control, and a 3.5 for Fun Factor, with the max score for each category being a 5.0.

== See also ==
- Mighty Morphin Power Rangers (video game)
- Mighty Morphin Power Rangers: The Fighting Edition
