= Dragon Fighter (video game) =

1990 video game

- North American box art
- Developer: Natsume
- Publishers: JP: Towa Chiki; NA: SOFEL
- Programmer: Toshiyasu Miyabe
- Artists: Tomihisa Fujimoto; Shuya Takaoka
- Composer: Kouichi Yamanishi
- Platform: Nintendo Entertainment System
- Release: JP: August 10, 1990; NA: January 1992
- Genre: Action
- Mode: Single-player

Dragon Fighter (ドラゴンファイター) is a fantasy-themed side-scrolling action game developed by Natsume for the Nintendo Entertainment System. It was first published in Japan by Towa Chiki in 1990 and in North America by SOFEL in 1992.

== Plot ==
Set in a fantasy world, an evil warlock named Zabbaong attacks the once peaceful land of Baljing with his army of monsters, leaving the country in ruins. The Dragon Spirit, the guardian deity of the Baljing people, decides to take vengeance on Zabbaong by bringing the statue of a legendary warrior to life. The warrior must travel to Zabbaong's lair at Mount Gia in order to slay the evil warlock and avenge the people of Baljing.

== Gameplay ==
The first stage of Dragon Fighter. The Metamorphosis gauge below the player's vitality gauge allows the main character to transform into a flying dragon.

The player takes control of a magical human fighter who has the ability to transform himself into a flying dragon. As the fighter, the player can run, crouch, jump, and attack with his sword as he would in most side-scrolling action games.

As the fighter, the player can also shoot a projectile attack by holding the B button until the character begins to flash, and waiting until the attack is fully charged. The types of projectile fired by the player depends on the color of the player's outfit, which can be changed by picking up certain power-up items labeled with the letters G (green, the player's default color), B (blue), and R (red). Underneath his life gauge is a "metamorphosis gauge" that will gradually be filled as the player destroys his enemies. When the metamorphosis gauge is at least halfway full, it will flash, and the player can transform into the dragon by pressing and holding "up" on the d-pad at the peak of a jump (the peaks of any jumps where the "A" button is let go prematurely also count). As a dragon, the player will hover in the air while the screen scrolls automatically to the right, similarly to a side-scrolling shoot-'em-up game. The dragon's attack corresponds to the color of the player's outfit. While the player can fly in any of the eight directions, they cannot turn around and the dragon will only face and attack to the right. As a dragon, the player's metamorphosis gauge will gradually be drained out. The player will transform back to a fighter if the metamorphosis gauge empties out completely, and the player can also transform back at any time by pressing the "down" and "A" buttons simultaneously. Though the instruction manual says this can also be done by rapidly pressing the A button, doing so does not work.

Other power-ups (besides the different color outfits) include energy restoring potions, a flower that helps fill the metamorphosis gauge faster, and a ring that destroys all on-screen enemies. At the end of each stage, the player will receive a staff that will increase their maximum health. The staff will also partly refill the players health.

There are six stages in all, each with their own guardian awaiting to challenge the warrior at the end. The game will end if the player loses all of their life power and only three chances are provided to continue at the stage where they died before the player is forced to start all over.
