= Palamedes (video game) =

1990 video game

- NES box cover
- Developers: Taito; Natsume (NES)
- Publishers: Arcade: JP: Taito; NA: Hot-B; NES: NA: Hot-B
- Platforms: Arcade, Nintendo Entertainment System, MSX, FM Towns, Game Boy
- Release: Arcade: JP: October 1990; NA: 1990; EU: November 1990; NES: JP: July 6, 1990; NA: November 1990
- Genre: Puzzle
- Modes: Single-player, multiplayer
- Arcade system: Taito L System

Palamedes (Note: Japanese: パラメデス, Hepburn: Paramedesu) is a puzzle video game released by Taito in 1990.

== Gameplay ==
Dice on the board can be cleared using a matching die.

Palamedes is a puzzle game requiring the players to match the dice they are holding to the dice at the top of the screen. Using the "B" button, the player can change the number on their dice, then throw it using the "A" button when it matches the dice at the top of the screen, which wipes the target dice off the board. By matching dice in combinations, like doing it with the same number several times in a row, or by doing a 1-to-6 sequence, the player is awarded a special move where they can eliminate three to five lines of dice on the game field. At regular time intervals (that get smaller as the game progresses) new dice lines appear, and when a die touches the bottom of the screen, the game ends.

The player can play in "solitaire" mode against the computer or another player, or "tournament" mode against AI opponents. There are six sides and numbers on the dice, making an attempt to match all the numbers on the screen and eliminating them a challenge.

== Release ==
Palamedes was released to arcades in Japan in October 1990. The Japanese magazine Game Machine listed Palamedes on their December 15, 1990 issue as being the sixteenth most-successful table arcade unit of the month.

It was released in Japan for the Family Computer on July 6, 1990. It received a release to North American markets in November 1990 for the Nintendo Entertainment System.

== Reception ==
Reception

Review scores
Publication	Score
Electronic Gaming Monthly	5/10, 7/10, 6/10, 7/10 (NES)
Famitsu	6/10, 6/10, 8/10, 4/10

David Wilson of Your Sinclair magazine reviewed the arcade game, giving it an 80% score. Zero magazine rated it three out of five.
