= Tail 'Gator =

1991 video game

- Japanese box art
- Developer(s): Natsume
- Publisher(s): JP: VAP; NA/EU: Natsume
- Composer(s): Iku Mizutani
- Platform(s): Game Boy
- Release: 1991
- Genre(s): Action-adventure
- Mode(s): Single player

Tail 'Gator, known in Japan as Shippo de Bun! (しっぽでブン!), is a Game Boy video game released in 1991. In the game, the player plays a small alligator known as 'Charly' who whips his tail forward to attack.

== Story ==
The story of the game centers on the conflict arising from a dragon warlord known as 'Basso Gila' who teleported his castle and army to the peaceful animal kingdom of 'Moberry' in order to destroy it and establish his ultimate rule. The council of elders of Moberry put Charly, the highland alligator, on the task to send the invaders packing in order to ensure their well-deserved freedom.

== Gameplay ==
There are five areas in Tail 'Gator; the first three are divided into four sections revolving around recurring themes: Air, land, cave, and underwater. The fourth and fifth areas are themed around Basso Gila's castle.

The player must complete all sections in order to advance to the next area. This is done by opening up treasure chests in each level. Each chest contains random items save for the last chest which is always a key to unlock the door.

Each section has four levels. In Area 2's "Land" section and Area 3's "Underwater" section, there are secret levels which are accessed by a hidden door that's partially revealed by obtaining the key. The fourth and fifth areas only have three levels each.

When Charly kills an enemy (normally two tail swings), it will eventually respawn at its starting point.

=== Power-ups ===
All the power-ups that can be collected by destroying the treasure chests are as follows:

- Heart: This will give Charly more H.P.; every time Charly is hit by an enemy his H.P. will decrease. When Charly runs out of hearts, the game is over, and his score is reset, even if the player opts to continue.
- Power: This will fill Charly's power meter. When the bar is full, it will begin to count down, during which Charly's tail attack will unleash a limited-range projectile. Collecting Power during this time will prolong the time limit.
- Bonus: This will give Charly extra points. Every time Charly collects a bonus without being hit, the points will increase. It starts from 100 and eventually reaches 10000; if Charly is hit, the points will start back at 100.
- Bomb: This item will instantly kill every enemy on the screen. The more enemies there are, the more points can be earned. If a bomb is collected while no enemy is in view, it will still give the player 100 points.
- Super Power: This rarely-seen item will fill Charly's power meter instantly. When taken while already powered up, it will increase the timer to the maximum. This item is most often found in the boss rooms.
- Key: This gives Charly access to the next stage in the area.

=== Bosses ===
- Area 1 Cave, Frog Boss: It leaps from one side of the battle area to the other, firing three balls horizontally at Charly. When Charly comes too close it will hit him.
- Area 2 Underwater, Fish Boss: It swims up and down, blowing bubbles that can be destroyed by a few tail swings. The bubbles can burst into three balls. The fish will eventually blow a very large bubble that fills the screen with projectiles.
- Area 3 Air, Bird Boss: It flies around shooting three projectiles and will eventually fire a very tall wave-like projectile.
- Area 4 Land, Otter Boss: It floats horizontally, clubbing two rocks together that produce star-shaped projectiles.
- Area 5 Castle, Basso Gila: It stands still in one place and fires a fireball which, when it hits the wall, will burst into three smaller projectiles.

== Reception ==
Allgame gives Tail 'Gator a 4.5/5
