= Spanky's Quest =

1991 platform video game

- North American Game Boy cover art
- Developer: Natsume
- Publishers: JP/NA: Natsume; EU: Taito (GB)
- Programmers: Toshiyasu Miyabe (GB); Satoshi Yoshikawa, Kenji Furuya (SNES)
- Artist: Tomoko Okamoto (GB)
- Composers: Hiroyuki Iwatsuki (GB); Kiyohiro Sada (SNES)
- Platforms: Game Boy; Super Nintendo Entertainment System
- Release: Game Boy: JP: 26 April 1991; NA: July 1992; EU: 1992; SNES: JP: 27 December 1991; NA: July 1992; EU: 1992
- Genre: Puzzle-platform
- Mode: Single-player

Spanky's Quest is a 1991 puzzle-platform game developed and published by Natsume for the Game Boy and Super Nintendo Entertainment System (SNES). Known in Japan as Monkey Reflections: The Adventures of Mr. Jiro (Note: Japanese language: 反省ザルジローくんの大冒険, Hepburn romanization: Hansei Zaru: Jirō-kun no Daibouken) on the SNES and Lucky Monkey (Note: Japanese language: ラッキーモンキー, Hepburn romanization: Rakkī Monkī) on the Game Boy, the player controls the monkey Spanky as they try to escape a tower created by the witch Morticia. Players are tasked with clearing rooms by using the help of a magic ball to progress. Depending on the console version, the way the player clears rooms changes.

Spanky's Quest has received mixed reception from critics. In 2021, the SNES version of the game was added to the Nintendo Classics service.

== Gameplay ==

Top: Game Boy version screenshot.
Bottom: SNES version screenshot.

Spanky attacks by throwing a small purple bubble. He can then bounce the bubble on his head. Every time he bounces the bubble, the bubble grows and changes color. The bubble can then be popped, depending on its size and color; different types of sports balls will fly out of the bubble, destroying enemies they touch. For example, a purple bubble will release a baseball, and the largest orange bubble will release several basketballs. If an enemy is touched by a bubble, he will simply be stunned and unable to move for a moment.

There are five worlds, each with ten levels. After clearing each world's ten levels, the player must face the main boss. After defeating all five bosses, the player fights the witch herself. In the SNES version, levels are cleared when the required number of keys unlocks a door; in the GB version, levels are cleared when all the enemies have been destroyed. The enemies in the game are generally different types of fruits, with the notable exception of the witch.

== Plot ==
The SNES game has a storyline in which Spanky, while walking into the woods to go on a picnic, is trapped in a tower by an evil witch named Morticia. Spanky has to defeat Morticia and find his way out of the tower. Along the way, Spanky has to deal with Morticia's minions (which are shaped like an apple, pineapple, watermelon, peach, and grapes, respectively), who also make the fruits in Spanky's knapsack sprout arms and legs and try to kill him.

== Development and release ==
The Super NES game is known for its very upbeat jazz soundtrack by Kiyohiro Sada.

The Game Boy title is somewhat similar to the SNES version but differs quite a bit.

The SNES version is a tie-in game between Taro Murasaki, a Japanese monkey showman, and his monkey, Jiro.

In May 2021, the Super Nintendo version of the game was re-released on the Nintendo Switch via the Nintendo Classics service.

== Reception ==
Reception

Review scores
Publication	Score	
Publication	Game Boy	SNES
Aktueller Software Markt	6/12	9/12
Electronic Gaming Monthly	N/A	6/10, 7/10, 6/10, 7/10
Famitsu	5/10, 6/10, 7/10, 4/10	8/10, 7/10, 7/10, 6/10
Game Players	N/A	7/10
Joypad	79%	N/A
Joystick	79%	N/A
Player One	N/A	88%
Total!	N/A	(UK) 54%, (DE) 3-
Video Games (DE)	72%	60%, 70%
VideoGames & Computer Entertainment	N/A	8/10
Control	N/A	62%
GB Action	60%	N/A
Hippon Super!	N/A	6/10
N-Force	65%	75%
Play Time	45%	N/A
Power Play	44%	N/A
SNES Force	N/A	75%
Super Action	N/A	89%
The Super Famicom	N/A	B+
Super Pro	N/A	44%

Spanky's Quest on the Game Boy garnered mixed reviews from critics.

=== Super NES ===
The Super NES version also received a mixed critical reception.

== Other media ==
Spanky, the main player character, makes a cameo as the red corner in the Famitsu Comic '92 Barcelona Olympic.
