= Dungeon Magic: Sword of the Elements =

1989 video game

- North American box art
- Developer: Natsume
- Publishers: JP: Natsume; NA: Taito
- Platform: Nintendo Entertainment System
- Release: JP: November 10, 1989; NA: July 1990
- Genres: Role-playing game, dungeon crawl
- Mode: Single-player

Dungeon Magic: Sword of the Elements (ダンジョン&マジック; "Dungeon & Magic: Swords of Element") is a real-time first-person RPG (akin to Dungeon Master and Eye of the Beholder) produced by Taito in 1989, and programmed by Natsume for the Nintendo Entertainment System.

== Plot ==
500 years ago, the Kingdom of Granville fought a terrible war with Darces the Dark Overlord. A great hero, the warrior "Magi", rose to challenge Darces. He owned six magical swords and a powerful suit of armor that was impervious to all but the most powerful of magic. Five of his six swords were Elemental blades, each created from the rarest metals on earth. The sixth blade, "Tores", used an even more powerful metal.

Using his powers, Magi defeated Darces, and exiled him to a far away land. After defeating Darces, Magi grew old and died.

Now, on a dark, stormy night in the Kingdom of Granville, Darces the Dark Overlord returns to the land.

According to an old saying:

"When the shadowed veil returns to mask the midday sun
The Fire of Serpents will rise again; Five shall become the One.
The elements now heed his call, and hope is born alive;
We will have our peace once more when One becomes the Five".

== Gameplay ==
Players explore towns looking for work and through dungeons looking for monsters to defeat. Players can also be apprenticed in elemental magic like wind, fire, water, and earth. The mighty castle of the realm can be found in north of Granville, the capital town. The task of the game is explained by the elder at the start of the game.

Food and water can be purchased and is used every time the player stops to rest at either a camp site or at an inn. Levels can only be gained by visiting the "wise men" at the villages at the right number of experience points and receiving a baptism from them.

Players can choose to either save or not to save their game after staying for a night at an inn.

=== Miscellany ===
One of the interesting aspects of the game was a magic system where a caster could combine runes from various elements to form new magic spells based on the elements: earth, water, wind, fire, and fairy magic.

Each element has three unique runes, which can be combined to cast 243 different spells. The spells are incredibly imaginative and each magic has different purposes. Fairy magic can reveal a world map and location of treasures; fire magic can cast powerful damaging firewalls; earth magic can cast protective or curative spells. There are even rare spells that when discovered can let players walk underneath the water and find underwater temples; or even teleport themselves to the world of the fairies, or fly to the clouds. This game had no "magic point" system, so some spells drained the player's hit points instead.
