= Smilesoft =

Japanese video game publisher

Smilesoft Co., Ltd. (スマイルソフト株式会社, Sumairusofuto Kabushiki Kaisha) was a Japanese company that published video games. Its headquarters were in the CT Sasazuka Building (CT笹塚ビル, CT Sasazuka Biru) in Shibuya, Tokyo.

Most of the games Smilesoft produced were monster-collecting role-playing video games. It shut down in 2003 after the president of the company, Shuhei Iida (飯田 就平, Iida Shūhei), was arrested on April 10 for charges of child prostitution at a female junior high school. After shutting down, the licenses to its games were bought up by Rocket Company. The company used the name "SMILE" to stand for Steady (堅実), Moral (道徳), Inventive (独創性), Lucky (幸運), and Effort (努力).

== Games ==
- 2000
  - Keitai Denjū Telefang Power Version (GBC, developed by Natsume Co., Ltd.)
  - Keitai Denjū Telefang Speed Version (GBC, developed by Natsume Co., Ltd.)
- 2001
  - Network Bōkenki Bugsite Alpha (GBC, developed by KAZe)
  - Network Bōkenki Bugsite Beta (GBC, developed by KAZe)
- 2002
  - Telefang 2 Power (GBA, developed by Natsume Co., Ltd.)
  - Telefang 2 Speed (GBA, developed by Natsume Co., Ltd.)
  - Gachaste! Dino Device Red (GBA)
  - Gachaste! Dino Device Blue (GBA)
  - Digital Ehon Vol. 1: Imadoki no Momotarou (PS1)
  - Digital Ehon Vol. 2: Imadoki no Kaguya Hime (PS1)
  - Digital Ehon Vol. 3: Imadoki no Sarukani (PS1)
  - Digital Ehon Vol. 4: Imadoki no Hanasaka Jiisan (PS1)
  - Digital Ehon Vol. 5: Imadoki no Urashi Matarou (PS1)
- 2003
  - Gachaste! Dino Device 2 Blue (GBA)
  - Gachaste! Dino Device 2 Blue (GBA)
