= Amazing Penguin =

1990 video game

- North American box art
- Developer(s): Natsume
- Publisher(s): Natsume
- Composer(s): Iku Mizutani; Koichi Yamanishi
- Platform(s): Game Boy
- Release: JP: August 8, 1990; NA: December 1990; EU: 1991
- Genre(s): Action
- Mode(s): Single-player

Amazing Penguin, known in Japan as Osawagase! Penguin Boy (おさわがせ! ペンギンBOY), is a 1990 action game developed by Natsume Co., Ltd. for the Game Boy. The game sees the player controlling a penguin as they attempt to clear a set number of lines using switches and dots scattered through stages to do so.

== Gameplay ==
The player controls a penguin who must clear 40 levels worth of action. There are a certain number of lines with switches and dots that need activating. Once all the lines are cleared, so are any enemies that are remaining in that level. A strict time limit make players lose their lives in addition to bumping into an enemy.

There is no regularity to the movement of the character, giving an element of luck to the game. Some aspects of background graphics appear in certain levels (especially on levels 12, 20, 28, and 36). Level 40 is essentially a giant maze which leads up to a castle that ends the game.

== Reception ==
Reception

Review score
Publication	Score
GamePro	21/25
