= Mighty Morphin Power Rangers (video game) =

- Super NES version cover art
- Developers: Natsume (SNES); Nova (Genesis); Sims (Game Gear); Tom Create, Pixel (Game Boy)
- Publishers: Bandai (SNES, GB); Sega (Genesis, Game Gear)
- Directors: Genesis; Hajime Ishikawa; Game Gear; Koji Ishitani
- Designers: Game Gear; Hiroyuki Kikkawa; Tetsuya Takei; Hiroko Kato
- Composers: SNES; Iku Mizutani; Kinuyo Yamashita; Game Gear; Keisuke Nishino; Genesis; Hiroshi Ebihara; Kennosuke Suemura
- Platforms: Super NES, Genesis/Mega Drive, Game Boy, Game Gear
- Release: Super NES: NA: September 1994; PAL: November 1994; JP: November 25, 1995; Genesis/Mega Drive: NA: 1994; PAL: December 1994; Game Gear: NA: 1994; PAL: 1994; Game Boy: NA: August 1994; PAL: 1994
- Genres: Fighting game, beat 'em up, action, platform
- Modes: Single-player, versus

Mighty Morphin Power Rangers is the title of five different video games based on the first season of the television series of the same name, one for each of the following game platforms: Sega Genesis, Super Nintendo Entertainment System, Game Boy, and Game Gear. The Nintendo versions of the game were released by Bandai, while the Sega versions were published by Sega itself and the production of the cartridge versions was carried by Banpresto, a pseudonym of Bandai. Despite the character's popularity and being a regular cast member by 1994, for unknown reasons, Tommy, the Green Ranger is only playable on the Genesis and Game Gear versions of the game.

== Super NES ==
The first level in the Super NES version of the game showing the roster of Rangers and Jason fighting a Putty Patroller

The Super NES version of Mighty Morphin Power Rangers is a side-scrolling action game composed of seven stages, with two different gameplay styles.

The four reviewers of Electronic Gaming Monthly gave the Super NES game ratings of 7/10, 6/10, 6/10 and 7/10. Three reviewers said it was too similar to other games in the genre, with one saing it's "just another mindless Final Fight-type game." Other reviewers suggested the game was for younger players who were fans of the show, as it offered very little challenge.

Nintendo Magazine System gave the game an overall score of 77, describing the difficulty as "mighty tough". Praise was given to the energetic presentation and style akin to the TV show, fluid controls and animation, and the attention to detail in making each character unique with trademark moves. One of the reviewers gave Bandai credit for "a genuine attempt at something vaguely special", calling the result "pretty cool", while the other reviewer dubbed the game unoriginal. Other criticism was directed at the old-fashioned gameplay and repetitive feel, with the final consensus being that the game was more for hardcore fans than hardcore gamers.

== Game Boy ==
The Game Boy version is a side-scrolling action game similar to the SNES game but much more simplified. There are five levels, each consisting of two segments. In the ranger segment, any of the five original rangers must go through a level while defeating putty patrols. Using the select button unlocks their unique weapon, but drains health with each use. The second segment is a Megazord fight versus the main villains of the show.

When played on the Super Game Boy adaptor for SNES, unique color palettes can be used with each ranger.

== Genesis ==
The Genesis/Mega Drive version is a one-on-one competitive fighting game, featuring two different game modes: a Scenario Mode where the player competes against a series of CPU-controlled opponents, and a Battle Mode for two players. In the Scenario Mode, the matches consist of two segments: the player will fight against a regular-sized monster as one of the Rangers, and after the defeating the monster they will battle a giant version of it. Initially, only the five original Rangers and the Megazord are available, but once the Green Ranger is defeated, he and the Dragonzord are unlocked.

GamePro panned the game, chiefly for the one-dimensional gameplay and unbalanced difficulty.

== Game Gear ==
In this version, the player has three basic attacks (one of which is accomplished by pressing the two action buttons simultaneously), a throw, and three special moves per character. The Game Gear version has more levels and enemies than the Genesis version. The game consists of three game modes: a single-player story game which features a series of plot-based battles against an assortment of enemies, a single-player vs. game, and a two-player Link game in which two players battle each other using the link cable. Like the Genesis version, the Green Ranger and Dragonzord (Including Dragonzord Battle Mode) become unlocked once they are defeated in the story mode.

GamePro described the game as "a satisfying blend of fighting and adventure, perfect for beginning players." They commented that the game's story mode is simplistic and very easy, but enjoyable, and is enhanced by the ability to control any of the Power Rangers in the game's other modes. Electronic Gaming Monthly praised the large number of moves and the ability to play as the Megazord, and scored the game a 6.2 out of 10.

== Sega CD ==
The Sega CD version is a full motion video-based quick time event game.

== See also ==
- Mighty Morphin Power Rangers: The Movie (video game)
- Mighty Morphin Power Rangers: The Fighting Edition
