= S.C.A.T.: Special Cybernetic Attack Team =

1990 video game

- Cover art
- Developer: Natsume
- Publishers: JP/NA: Natsume; EU: Infogrames Entertainment
- Producer: Satoshi Yoshikawa
- Programmers: Satoshi Yoshikawa; Kenji Furuya
- Artists: Mikihiko Funada; Hiroshi Takai; Shunji Ohminami
- Composer: Kiyohiro Sada
- Platform: Nintendo Entertainment System
- Release: NES: JP: June 22, 1990; NA: June 1991; PAL: 1992
- Genre: Shoot 'em up
- Modes: Single-player, multiplayer

S.C.A.T.: Special Cybernetic Attack Team, also known as Final Mission (ファイナルミッション, Fainaru Misshon) in Japan and Action in New York in Europe, is a science fiction side-view shoot-'em-up produced by Natsume for the Nintendo Entertainment System. Within PAL-A regions, the game was only released in the UK. It was released in Japan in 1990, in North America in 1991, and in the PAL region in 1992. It was also later released on the Virtual Console in the PAL region on February 4, 2011, and in North America on February 7 for the Wii and in the PAL region on December 4, 2014 for the Nintendo 3DS and Wii U and was released on the Nintendo Switch via the Nintendo Classics service on September 23, 2020. On September 1, 2026, Tengo Project has announced that a remake is under development under the title Cybernetic Attack: Final Mission.

== Plot ==
The year is 2029, and an army of alien invaders led by Vile Malmort has planted an "Astrotube" connecting the ruins of New York City to their space station. A team of part-human, part-machine soldiers known as the Special Cybernetic Attack Team, or "SCAT," has been assembled to combat the invasion.

== Gameplay ==
S.C.A.T.: Special Cybernetic Attack Team gameplay

S.C.A.T. can be played by up to two players simultaneously. During the 1-Player Mode, the player can choose between a male soldier named Arnold, or a female one named Sigourney, while in 2 Players mode, Player 1 controls Arnold while Player 2 controls Sigourney. There are no skill differences between the two characters.

As Arnold or Sigourney, the player flies through the air shooting at enemies with their gun while the screen scrolls automatically horizontally or vertically until the end of each stage (similarly to the Capcom arcade game Forgotten Worlds). While the player character can fly in eight directions, they can only shoot their gun left or right. However, the player is surrounded by two satellite modules that will shoot at enemies at the same time the player fires their weapon. The satellites will orbit around the player by default, with one orbiting above and the other below the player. If the satellites are aligned in a position the player wants to maintain, they can keep the position by pressing the A button. The player can toggle back and forth between the two satellite modes.

There are five power-up items that can be obtained by destroying certain containers, each represented by a letter-based icon. Three of these items are new weapons that will replace the player's default gun (a Laser, a Wide Beam, and a Bomb launcher), while the other two are a speed power-up and a life recovery. There are a total of five stages in the game, along with the usual boss encounters. The player begins the game with a total of six hit points and the game will end if they are all lost. Unlike Shadow of the Ninja, the player is given unlimited chances to continue.

== Version differences ==
The Japanese version, Final Mission, was released a year before the American version and there are a few differences between the two. The game's opening story sequence is completely different, showing the obliteration of various cities before the alien invasion begins. Instead of a selectable male or female main character, both players control palette-swapped male soldiers, one of whom is Russian, which was inconceivable for the western market. The game's difficulty was made easier for the American version as well. Instead of six lives, the player begins with only three lives and any upgrade they possess is lost whenever their character is hit. The player's satellites also function differently. Instead of orbiting automatically, they're aligned by the player while moving the character left or right. Their firepower was also weaker. The map shown before each stage in the American version was not featured in the original Japanese version.

The European version, Action in New York, is almost identical to the American version. Besides the title change, the names of the main characters were also changed from Arnold and Sigourney to Silver Man and Sparks respectively. Their respective likeness to their namesakes, actors Arnold Schwarzenegger and Sigourney Weaver, was left unchanged. Their team affiliation was also changed from "SCAT" to "SAT" (Special Attack Team).

== Reception ==
Reception

Review scores
Publication	Score
AllGame	4/5
Aktueller Software Markt	3/12
Electronic Gaming Monthly	30/40
GamePro	24/25
GameZone	81/100
Nintendo Life	8/10
Nintendo Power	14.2/20
Total!	69%
Video Games (DE)	71%
VideoGames & Computer Entertainment	7/10
N-Force	85/100
Super Gamer	51%

The music by Kiyohiro Sada is universally praised alongside the high quality of the gameplay.
