= Hana Tāka Daka!? =

1991 video game

- Developer: Taito/Natsume
- Publisher: Taito
- Composer: Kinuyo Yamashita
- Platform: PC Engine
- Release: JP: August 9, 1991
- Genre: Horizontal-scrolling shooter
- Mode: Single-player

Hana Tāka Daka!? (Note: Japanese: はなたーかだか!?, Hepburn: Hana Tahka Daka!?; lit. 'Long-Nosed Goblin!?') is a 1991 side-scrolling shoot 'em up video game released for the NEC PC Engine by Taito.

== Gameplay ==
Gameplay screenshot

The player controls a Tengu, a flying creature from Japanese folklore, that must defeat enemies and avoid obstacles. The Tengu’s main goal is to rescue two foxes, Inari and Konta, that got into trouble with raccoon dogs.

== Development and release ==
According to the Famitsu website, a special album was released with the soundtracks of Hana Taaka Daka!? and other retro games in 2017.

== Reception ==
Reception

Review scores
Publication	Score
Consoles +	87%
Gekkan PC Engine	80/100, 80/100, 75/100, 80/100, 80/100
Génération 4	90%
Joypad	90%
Joystick	85%
Marukatsu PC Engine	6/10, 7/10, 9/10, 7/10
Player One	92%
Electric Brain	77%
Game Boy	4/5, 3/5, 4/5, 4/5, 3/5
Hippon Super!	7/10

Hana Tāka Daka!? received generally favorable reviews. Japanese publication Micom BASIC Magazine ranked the game fifth in popularity in its November 1991 issue. TurboPlay's Victor Ireland noted the game's whimsical characters, while Hardcore Gaming 101's Daniel Brink regarded it as an outstanding title in the PC Engine library.
