= Keitai Denjū Telefang =

2000 video game for the Game Boy Color

Keitai Denjū Telefang; Keitai Denjū Telefang 2
- Developer: Natsume Co., Ltd.
- Publisher: Smilesoft
- Designer: Takagi Toushi
- Composer: Kinuyo Yamashita
- Platforms: Game Boy Color (Keitai Denjū Telefang); Game Boy Advance (Keitai Denjū Telefang 2)
- Release: Keitai Denjū Telefang; JP: November 3, 2000; Keitai Denjū Telefang 2; JP: April 26, 2002
- Genre: Role-playing
- Modes: Single-player, multiplayer

Keitai Denjū Telefang (Japanese: 携帯電獣テレファング, Hepburn: Keitai Denjū Terefangu; lit. "Mobile Phone Beast Telefang") is a series of role-playing video games (RPGs) developed by Natsume Co., Ltd. and published by Smilesoft. In the games, the player contacts various creatures using a mobile phone-like device in order to get them to battle the foes they will encounter. Released exclusively in Japan on November 3, 2000 for the Game Boy Color, it came in two versions: Power Version (パワーバージョン, Pawā Bājon) and Speed Version (スピードバージョン, Supīdo Bājon). Each version features several exclusive creatures. The name of the series derives from keitai (携帯), the Japanese term for mobile phone, as making phone calls to the creatures is an integral part of the games, and fang, to symbolize the various beasts involved.

On April 26, 2002, a sequel for the Game Boy Advance called Keitai Denjū Telefang 2 (携帯電獣テレファング２, Keitai Denjū Terefangu Tsū; lit. "Mobile Phone Beast Telefang 2") was released exclusively in Japan. Likewise, two versions were released, also called Power Version (パワーバージョン, Pawā Bājon) and Speed Version (スピードバージョン, Supīdo Bājon), featuring similar differences between them.

== Gameplay ==
A screenshot of Keitai Denjū Telefang. Shigeki, the protagonist, encounters his rival, Kai, for the first time, in Palm Sea. Their respective Denjū, Fungus and Gymnos, are about to battle each other.

Keitai Denjū Telefang and Keitai Denjū Telefang 2 revolve around collecting the phone numbers of various creatures, referred to as Denjū (電獣), on a device called D-Shot (Ｄショット, Dī Shotto), that the player, classified as a T-Fanger (Tファンガー, T fangā), encounters and must defeat. These are used to be able to request aid from them at a later time, should they require it. The games are played from a third-person, top-down perspective, with the player taking the role of the games' young protagonist and main T-Fanger: Shigeki in Keitai Denjū Telefang and Kyō in Keitai Denjū Telefang 2.

One Denjū stays by the player's side at a time and follows them around but in battle he can call up to two other Denjū to help them. Denjū will sometimes give the player their phone numbers after they beat them in a random battle but take longer to arrive in battle if they're originally from a distant area, due to getting lost. Sometimes, they may not even show up at all if called, so care must be taken to make sure that the player is not calling a Denjū which is too far away.

=== Mechanics ===
All Denjū have a range of statistics (colloquially called "stats"): Hit Points (HP), Speed, Attack, Defense, Denma Attack and Denma Defense. These statistics determine how powerful, fast or robust any given Denjū is. The type of habitat a Denjū lives in determines how weak it is to attacks from Denjū from other habitats; there is a vulnerability chain that goes from Mountain to Sky, from Sky to Forest, from Forest to Aquatic, from Aquatic to Desert, from Desert to Grassland and, finally, from Grassland to Mountain. This also applies in reverse in the sense that a Denjū of certain types inflicts less damage upon one it is weak to. However, this was slightly changed in Keitai Denjū Telefang 2, where Denjū's habitat types are defensive, and attacks are of separate offensive types: Normal, Flame, Thunder, Water, Wind, Rock and Machine. This arrangement makes Denjū a bit more versatile, as they may carry moves that would be effective against opponents they would normally have trouble against.

In battle, the Denjū have an array of two to four attacks specific to their species. The battles are not strictly turn-based; the Speed stat of a Denjū determines how many turns it can take and when. Thus, for example, a Denjū with a higher Speed stat could attack twice for every time a Denjū with a lower Speed stat goes once, also attacking before the slower Denjū can get a hit in. Battles are performed in matches where each team may have anywhere from one to three Denjū participating. Losing causes a game over and the player is then returned to the title screen of the games.

A Denjū's attacks cannot be altered unless a Denjū evolves. Evolution is achieved by three different methods: "Natural evolution" (achieved by training Denjū), "Modified evolution" (by giving Denjū certain items in a "modified evolution" area) or "Experimental evolution" (achieved by taking the DNA of one Denjū with an item called Phone Card and giving it to the Denjū to be "experimentally evolved"). Some Denjū do not evolve. In Keitai Denjū Telefang, evolution is permanent but in Keitai Denjū Telefang 2, evolution can be reversed if it was not achieved through "Natural evolution".

Many Denjū have a special attack called Denma attack that needs to be charged up and takes multiple turns to execute. This special attack does damage based on the Denjū's Denma Attack stat and is often considered not to be worth the wait. Due to the time that it takes for the special attack to charge, it is easy for the opponent to attack during multiple turns or to avoid the move entirely. In Keitai Denjū Telefang 2, instead of having to wait for a Denma attack to charge, its use is limited by a DP meter. There are other attacks that can raise the Attack or Defense stat of a Denjū or heal the user or its allies. These vary from Denjū to Denjū.

The use of items varies greatly between Keitai Denjū Telefang and Keitai Denjū Telefang 2. In Keitai Denjū Telefang, items are only used for evolving Denjū or gifts, excluding some items that are important to the storyline such as keys to unlock doors or a plush Denjū toy that has been stolen. Evolution items are generally objects that come from the human world. These items are capable of affecting Denjū in certain ways when they are forcibly combined. Such items range from simple objects like pencils and batteries to flamethrowers, computers, cranes and shuriken. Denjū which evolve via "Modified evolution" will only do so if they receive a specific item. Certain items also give large amounts of experience points to Denjū without evolving them. In Keitai Denjū Telefang 2, evolution items are of the same type as Denjū (Mountain, Sky, Forest, Aquatic, Desert or Grassland) and any such item can be used to evolve a Denjū of the same type. However, different items may have certain effects on stat growth. Evolution items can also be thrown at enemy Denjū to attempt to befriend them more easily and the probability of this occurring is increased if the item thrown matches their type. In addition to evolution items, there are also special items which can be held by Denjū to boost one of their stats. Keitai Denjū Telefang 2 also introduced items which can heal a Denjū's HP and/or DP as well as cure status effects such as paralysis. Items can be purchased at shops or found in treasure chests but may also be picked up after battles or found by running through grass.

== Plot ==
=== Keitai Denjū Telefang ===
The games take place in the year 2020 and there are special mobile phones equipped with a unique antenna called D-Shot which allows teleportation through "antenna trees". A 10-year-old boy named Shigeki finds one of these phones and is accidentally transported with another boy, Matsukiyo, to another world when he loses a baseball near an "antenna tree".

This world is full of fantasy creatures called Denjū, who all own a D-Shot and use them to call their friends to help them compete in battles. These phone battles are also known as Telefang. Shigeki becomes a T-Fanger and travels the Denjū world, trying to learn more about it. At the same time, he gets wrapped up in several plots involving evil Denjū as well as other humans, who may or may not be T-Fangers.

=== Keitai Denjū Telefang 2 ===
The games follow the story of Kyō, a blue-haired 10-year-old T-Fanger who travels to the Denjū world to look for his missing father. His friend Midori accompanies him on the journey. During his adventure, he encounters a Denjū named Diablos, who is killing off the "antenna trees" as he is not happy with the fact that humans are entering the Denjū world.

After Diablos kills all but one "antenna tree", that tree becomes the only gate between the two worlds. Kyō has to prevent Diablos from killing that last "antenna tree", or Kyō will be stuck in the Denjū world forever.

== Characters ==
=== In Keitai Denjū Telefang ===
==== Humans ====
- Shigeki (シゲキ) - The protagonist and main T-Fanger of Keitai Denjū Telefang. He is an average 10-year-old boy who loves baseball. He is transported to the Denjū world when he loses a ball near a strange tree.
- Matsukiyo (マツキヨ) - A child prodigy who wants to learn more about the Denjū world. He accidentally gets transported there along with Shigeki. He reappears in Keitai Denjū Telefang 2.
- Miyo (ミヨ) - She is a strong-willed girl who is described as a childhood friend of Shigeki but teases him about never having been to the Denjū world.
- Kai (カイ) - A mysterious boy encountered during Shigeki's travels and whose purpose in the Denjū world is unclear, though he serves as Shigeki's rival.
- Sanaeba (サナエバ) - The owner of the Sanaeba pharmaceutical company, whose staff were the first to discover the Denjū world. After the discovery, they began to branch their business into other areas. They also control the gates that connect the Denjū and human worlds. While they allow children to come and go freely, adults must pay a fee. Sanaeba seems to have his name attached to many of the problems which have cropped up in the Denjū world and is apparently manipulating Denjū for unknown reasons.
  - Nerikara (ネリカラ) - A member of Sanaeba who tries to become prime minister of the Denjū world. He tries to get people to vote for him by setting up a curry store.
  - Tabasco (タバスコ, Tabasuko) - An enemy of Shigeki in the Denjū world.

==== Denjū ====
- Crypto (クリプト, Kuriputo) - A strong hot-tempered Denjū; it is assigned by Musa as Shigeki's first partner in Power Version.
- Fungus (ファンガス, Fangasu) - A swift faithful Denjū; it is assigned by Musa as Shigeki's first partner in Speed Version.
- Musa (ムサ) - An old, turtle-like Denjū who is the first to greet Shigeki and Matsukiyo after they're dropped into the Denjū world. It asks for their help with various problems that its world is facing and introduces Shigeki to his first partner. Musa's phone number is one of the secret phone numbers which must be manually input and it cannot be obtained as a partner otherwise during normal gameplay.
- Angios (アンヂオス, Anjiosu) and Gymnos (ヂムノス, Jimunosu) - The Denjū that is the partner of Kai, Shigeki's rival, being Angios in Power Version and Gymnos in Speed Version, respectively.
- Suguri (スグリ) - A weasel-like Denjū who is the partner of Miyo.
- Waratah (ワラタ, Warata) - A Denjū that resembles a Waratah and who is the partner of Matsukiyo.

=== In Keitai Denjū Telefang 2 ===
==== Humans ====
- Kyō (キョウ) - The protagonist and main T-Fanger of Keitai Denjū Telefang 2. He is a blue-haired 10-year-old boy who goes to the Denjū world to look for his missing father.
- Midori (ミドリ) - She is a friend of Kyō who travels the Denjū world with him.
- Yū (ユウ) and Otome (オトメ) - Two characters that appear in Power Version and Speed Version, respectively. They serve as Kyō's rival in the corresponding versions.
- Matsukiyo (マツキヨ) - The child prodigy who entered the Denjū world along with Shigeki in Keitai Denjū Telefang is now a professor living in the human world, where he runs a laboratory and pays Kyō for collecting information on certain Denjū.

==== Denjū ====
- Rex (レックス, Rekkusu) - The first partner Denjū of Kyō.
- Chakor (チャコル, Chakoru) - The first partner Denjū of Midori. It appears to be based on the chukar partridge.
- Doon (ドーン, Dōn) - The partner Denjū of Yū, the rival in Power Version.
- Gyuun (ギューン, Gyūn) - The partner Denjū of Otome, the rival in Speed Version.
- Diablos (ディアボロス, Diaborosu) - A Denjū who is unhappy with the presence and influence of humans in the Denjū world. He is killing off the "antenna trees" to prevent contact between the Denjū world and the human world.

== Manga adaptation ==
A manga series based on the Power Version was serialized by Kodansha. First released as a monthly feature in the Comic BomBom magazine, the manga's issues were later reprinted as a set of three tankōbon, or volumes. A manga was also serialized by Kodansha for Keitai Denjū Telefang 2; however, it was featured only in the Comic BomBom magazine and was never reprinted.

== Piracy ==
Pokémon Diamond, modified from the Power Version

The first two Keitai Denjū Telefang games received an unofficial English translation. The original games were not related to Nintendo's Pokémon series, but the translations were marketed as Pokémon Diamond (Note: This preceded the unrelated, official Pokémon Diamond Version, released in 2006.) and Pokémon Jade. The creatures used for the cover arts are neither Denjuu nor Pokémon; the box for Pokémon Jade depicts a modified design of the forest spirit from Princess Mononoke, while the box for Pokémon Diamond depicts a blue snake-like creature of unknown origin. The translations are notorious for their poorly translated English text as well as serious programming errors not present in the original games that can cause the game to crash.
