= Sherlock Holmes: Hakushaku Reijō Yūkai Jiken =

1986 video game

- Cover art
- Developer: Towa Chiki
- Publisher: Towa Chiki
- Platform: Family Computer
- Release: JP: December 11, 1986
- Genre: Action
- Mode: Single-player

Sherlock Holmes: Hakushaku Reijō Yūkai Jiken (シャーロック・ホームズ 伯爵令嬢誘拐事件; lit. "Sherlock Holmes: The Kidnapping of the Earl's Daughter") is an action video game that was released exclusively in Japan for the Family Computer. An unofficial English translation patch for the game was released on December 9, 2018.

== Gameplay ==
Sherlock Holmes has to rescue a countess, the daughter of an earl, from an evil kidnapper. By travelling all over Great Britain, he can collect the clues and defeat the thugs in order to conduct a thorough investigation.

Parks, sewers, and private houses provide clues needed to solve the mystery and bring the kidnapper to justice. Innocent citizens can also be kicked around just like criminals. Knives and guns can also be integrated into Holmes' offensive techniques, allowing him to collect money from fallen thugs. If Holmes is killed by any means, the mystery becomes a perfect crime, thus terminating the game.

During the game, players must collect a magnifying glass amongst other tools typically used by Sherlock Holmes. This game features urban violence; particularly in London, which was seen as a "rowdy" city during the late Victorian era. Players can also encounter large groups of violent non-player characters in the "rough streets" of Birmingham. Determining enemy characters from innocent civilians is a challenging endeavor. Despite this, the game does not punish the player for firing a loaded weapon on a busy city street during the daytime hours. Famous British landmarks offer important tidbits that permit the investigation to move forward.
