= Power Rangers Zeo: Battle Racers =

1996 video game

- Cover art
- Developer: Natsume Co., Ltd.
- Publisher: Bandai America
- Composers: Hiroyuki Iwatsuki; Haruo Ohashi
- Platform: Super NES
- Release: 1996
- Genre: Racing
- Modes: Single-player, multiplayer

Power Rangers Zeo: Battle Racers is a Super NES racing video game released in 1996 by Bandai.

The game was based on the Zeo generation of Power Rangers. It features Mode 7 graphics. The game allows for two-player or single-player split screen racing or battle mode.

== Reception ==
GamePro's The Feature Creature panned the game, criticizing the use of split screen even in single-player mode, and the stiff controls. He scored it a 2 out of 5 in every category (graphics, sound, control, and FunFactor).
