= Gundam: Battle Assault =

Video game series by Bandai

Gundam: The Battle Master (ガンダム・ザ・バトルマスター), later known as Battle Assault, is a series of fighting games released for the PlayStation, PlayStation 2 and Game Boy Advance. The series features mobile suits from several eras of the Gundam franchise and some non-traditional fighting game elements. Every entry was developed by Bandai in co-operation with Japanese developer Natsume, who also made the 1996 Shin Kidō Senki Gundam Wing: Endless Duel.

== Gundam: The Battle Master ==
Gundam: The Battle Master
- Developers: Bandai, Natsume
- Publisher: Bandai
- Platform: PlayStation
- Release: JP: 1997-06-22
- Genres: Versus Fighting; Mecha Sci-Fi
- Modes: Single player, multiplayer

== Overview ==
Gundam: The Battle Master is the first game in the series, released for the PlayStation in 1997. Even this first game features the large multi-jointed sprites and 2-screen-high stages that the rest of the series would follow on. The game would also feature its own unique pilots that are exclusive to this game, replacing the regular pilots that are often associated with each mobile suit in the franchise. It includes the following mobile suits from the Universal Century era:

== Story ==
=== Gundam: The Battle Master ===
Due to global pollution and increase in population, humanity is no longer able to thrive on Earth. It fell to the International Symbiotic Community to create a new home for mankind in outer space by exploring other planets. Upon confirmation of viable living conditions, planetary colonization started immediately, successfully creating new homes many years later. However, some colonies rebelled against the Community when they began to impose order, the resulting chaos leading to mass destruction. To protect themselves, the colonies created Mobile Suits. Due to their rarity and power, they became precious commodities and bounty hunters soon took these powerful machines for themselves. A vicious battle between these mercenaries soon broke out, the likes of which mankind has never seen.

=== Gundam: The Battle Master 2 ===
In A.W. 376, Earth was devastated by a massive meteor fall. People called this great disaster the Judgment of Flame. Several years later, courier Gloria Chanvalley one day finds a mysterious boy named Pixie near a spaceship that had fallen into ruins. A message from a mysterious woman on the spaceship instructed her, "If you keep protecting Pixie until contacted, you'll pay a monthly reward," Gloria decides to protect Pixie. However, suddenly, the government forces are offered a bounty on Gloria, and she fights back with a mobile suit for self-defense against the attacking bounty hunters and government troops. However, the pixie actually hides a grave secret, and the lunar city said to have triggered the Judgment of Flame is involved in this.

== Playble Original Characters ==
Mercury Promenade (マーキュリープロムナード, mercurypromenado)
A soldier belonging to the Nomad Parliament Army. He was forced to enlist on his 18th birthday and spent his days repeating boring simulated training with a mobile suit equipped for actual combat. He never lost a single training match and was praised by his superiors for his excellent performance, but he himself was apathetic towards the training, thinking, "It's just training," and "I can't even hold a candle to the veteran pilots who have survived and won in real combat." However, after his and 10 other mobile suits were defeated during training with the hero Lloyd Nichols , he painfully realized his own arrogance and immaturity. At the same time, he began to respect Lloyd, and Lloyd, who taught him about the pride of a warrior, became Mercury's role model. Afterwards, Mercury was assigned to a combat unit and enjoyed a fulfilling military life under the equally respected superior officer, Park West. However, one day, an incident occurred in which Maria Nichols, a test subject who escaped from a top-secret military research facility, stole the Psycho Gundam Mk-III and escaped again. Furthermore, a superior officer who participated in the pursuit mission was killed in the line of duty. Afterwards, Mercury was assigned to a combat unit and enjoyed a fulfilling military life under the equally respected superior officer, Park West. However, one day, an incident occurred in which Maria Nichols , a test subject who escaped from a top-secret military research facility, stole the Psycho Gundam Mk-III and escaped again. Furthermore, a superior officer who participated in the pursuit mission was killed in the line of duty. He pilot mobile suit is RX-78-2 Gundam later in sequel pilot new mobile suit MSZ-006 Zeta Gundam.
Lloyd Nichols (ロイド・ニコルズ, Roido nikoruzu)
Honey-B (ハニーB, Hanī B)
Rachel Aiphath (レイチェル・フォート, Reicheru fōto)
Synapse (シナプス, Shinapusu)
Carol Youngfan (キャロル・ヤングファン, Kyaroru yangufan)
Keiji Date (ケイジ・ダテ, Keiji Date)
Smith Kingsley (スミス・キングスレイ, Sumisu kingusurei)
Largo Ford (ラルゴ・フォード, Rarugo fōdo)
Noise Maddy (ノイズ・マッディー, Noizu maddī)
Gals Gordini (ガールズ・ゴルディーニ, Gāruzu gorudīni)
Stein H. Srihin (スタイン・H・スリヒン, Sutain H surihin)
Maria Nichols (マリア・ニコルズ, Maria nikoruzu)
Gloria Chanvalley (グロリア・チャンバレー, Guroria chanbarē)
Pixie (ピクシー, Pikushī)
Rita Sue (リタ・スー, Rita sū)
Patricia Estefan (パトリシア・エステファン, Patorishia esute fan)

== Playable Mobile Suit from previous series ==
- FA-010S Full Armor Enhanced ZZ Gundam
- MSZ-006 Zeta Gundam
- MS-06F Zaku II
- MS-06S Zaku II Commander Type
- MSM-04 Acguy
- MSM-03C Hygogg
- MSN-02 Zeong
- MSN-04 Sazabi
- NZ-000 Quin Mantha
- PMX-003 The O
- AMX-103 Hamma Hamma
- AMX-004 Qubeley
- RX-78-2 Gundam
- RX-78GP02A Gundam Physallis
- RX-93 Nu Gundam
- RB-79 Ball
- OZ-15AGX Hydra Gundam

== Bosses (Non-Playable) ==
- MA-08 Big Zam
- AMX-002 (AMA-X2) Neue Ziel
- Psyco Gundam Mark III

== Gameplay ==
Gundam: The Battle Master features gameplay unlike most fighting games, let alone the other games within its series:

- Mobile suit movement is realistically slow.
- Repeated damage to a specific body part on an enemy will result in that part's armor breaking.
- There's no standard "health bar". Instead, a mobile suit has a "temperature bar" that would fill up as it gets hit. When the bar is full, the mobile suit overheats and is knocked down. When a mobile suit overheats four times, it is knocked out and loses the fight.
- The standard punch and kick buttons are complemented by a shoot button (for firing beam rifles or machine guns), a weapon button (beam sabers, heat hawks, etc.), and a thrust button that allows the mobile suit to fly indefinitely. This is similar to Endless Duel, as well as games such as Capcom's Cyberbots.
- Projectiles are unblockable.
- Special moves are limited. A mobile suit will have a rapid fire version of the shoot button and one or two unique moves. All special moves drain a bar below the temperature bar that can only be filled by connecting with melee attacks.
- Some mobile suits can dodge into the background to avoid attacks, while others can erect a beam barrier that can block projectiles (which can be held indefinitely unless hit by a melee attack).
- Bosses are massive and fill up nearly half the screen. They can not be knocked back by any attack unless they overheat.

== Mobile Suit Gundam Seed: Battle Assault and Mobile Suit Gundam SEED Destiny ==
Mobile Suit Gundam Seed: Battle Assault Mobile Suit Gundam SEED Destiny
- Developer: Natsume
- Publisher: Bandai
- Platform: Game Boy Advance
- Release: Mobile Suit Gundam Seed: Battle Assault: NA: 2004-08-10; Mobile Suit Gundam SEED Destiny: JP: 2004-11-25
- Genres: Versus Fighting; Mecha Sci-Fi
- Modes: Single player, multiplayer

In 2004, Mobile Suit Gundam Seed: Battle Assault was released for the Game Boy Advance and featured units exclusively from the then-recent localization of Mobile Suit Gundam SEED. The units included all the Gundams from the show sans the Providence, as well as Rau Le Creuset's CGUE and the Gundam Astray Red Frame. It was released exclusively in the US.

The gameplay for this portable installment is similar to its three PlayStation predecessors, with the difference of being faster and more user-friendly. The player had the option of choosing a manual method for executing special moves or an automatic one (similar to the easy mode of Capcom's Vs. series). The player could also adjust one of three parameters (HP, Phase Shift Armor or Thrust) at the cost of the other.

There was also an updated version of the game focusing on the SEED Destiny sequel series, named simply Mobile Suit Gundam SEED Destiny. Unlike the original game, however, it was released only in Japan and included the original game as an unlockable. This version features all the units from the previous plus the initial suits of the SEED Destiny anime (it lacks GOUF Ignited, Murasame, Dom Trooper, Strike Freedom, Infinite Justice, Destiny, Legend and Akatsuki).

== Battle Assault 3 Featuring Gundam SEED ==
Battle Assault 3: Featuring Gundam SEED
- Developer: Natsume
- Publisher: Bandai America
- Platform: PlayStation 2
- Release: NA: 2004-12-07
- Genres: Versus Fighting; Mecha Sci-Fi
- Modes: Single player, multiplayer

Battle Assault 3 is the fifth game in the series. It was released on the PlayStation 2, four months after the GBA installment. It was the first to feature full 3D graphics and it also focused on units from the Gundam Seed anime, including grunt mobile suits like GINNs. However, the Wing Gundam Zero Custom, Tallgeese III, Burning (God) Gundam and Master Gundam appear as unlockable secret characters. It was only released in the US.

== See also ==
- Shin Kidō Senki Gundam Wing: Endless Duel
- List of fighting games
