= Power Rangers Dino Thunder (video game) =

2004 video game

- PAL region cover art for PS2 version
- Developers: Pacific Coast Power & Light (GC, PS2); Natsume (GBA)
- Publisher: THQ
- Producer: Don Traeger
- Composer: Inon Zur
- Series: Power Rangers
- Platforms: Game Boy Advance, GameCube, PlayStation 2
- Release: NA: September 22, 2004; EU: November 26, 2004; AU: December 3, 2004 (PS2); AU: January 14, 2005 (GBA, GC)
- Genre: Action-adventure
- Mode: Single-player

Power Rangers Dino Thunder is a 2004 action-adventure video game based on the television series of the same name, adapted from Bakuryū Sentai Abaranger. The game was developed by Natsume and Pacific Coast Power & Light, and published by THQ for the Game Boy Advance, GameCube, and PlayStation 2.

== Gameplay ==
=== Game Boy Advance version ===
The Game Boy Advance version of Power Rangers Dino Thunder is a side-scrolling fighting game with puzzle-solving mini-missions. Five characters are featured in the game:

- Red Tyranno Ranger, attacks with Tyranno Staff and has the special power to summon the TyrannoZord.
- Blue Tricera Ranger, attacks with Tricera Shield and has the special power to summon the TriceraZord.
- Yellow Ptera Ranger, attacks with Ptera Grips and has the special power to summon the PteraZord.
- Black Brachio Ranger, solves puzzle missions to free the Cephala, Parasaur, Ankylo, and Dimetro Zords.
- White Drago Ranger, acts as an enemy, blocking the Black Ranger in puzzle missions and sending his DragoZord and StegoZord in their megazord formation to fight the ThunderSaurus MegaZord.

The player fights enemies as the three core rangers while meeting goals, such as finding and rescuing humans or defeating a number of monsters while the Black Ranger solves puzzles to free captured Zords. MegaZord battles also occur whenever an enemy enlarges to giant size. MegaZord levels allow the player to customize the ThunderSaurus MegaZord with auxiliary Zords obtained from the puzzle levels.

The game features 13 missions, played across 20 levels.

=== Console version ===
The rangers pilot their Zords in various missions to save the world from Zeltrax.

Players take control of one of three Zords, Red TyrannoZord, Blue TriceraZord, or Yellow PteraZord in order to free the captive DinoZords (Violet CephalaZord, Green ParasaurZord, and Cyan DimetroZord), escort the Black BrachioZord to various warp points, and destroy alien weapon facilities. Also by collecting morphers, eggs, and crystal icons, players can unlock the zords from Power Rangers Wild Force (Red Lion Wildzord, Yellow Eagle Wildzord, Blue Shark Wildzord, Black Bison Wildzord, White Tiger Wildzord) and Power Rangers Ninja Storm (Hawkzord, Lionzord, Dolphinzord, Crimson Insectzord, Navy Beetlezord) as playable characters.

== Reception ==
Reception

Aggregate score
Aggregator	Score		
Aggregator	GBA	GameCube	PS2
Metacritic	49/100	49/100	49/100

Review scores
Publication	Score		
Publication	GBA	GameCube	PS2
Game Informer	3.5/10	6/10	6/10
GameZone	6.4/10	4.9/10	5.3/10
IGN	N/A	4.5/10	4.5/10
Jeuxvideo.com	7/20	9/20	9/20
Nintendo Power	2.5/5	2.8/5	N/A
Official U.S. PlayStation Magazine	N/A	N/A	2/5

The game received "generally unfavorable reviews" on all platforms according to the review aggregation website Metacritic.
