= Power Rangers S.P.D. (video game) =

2005 video game

- Developer: Natsume Co., Ltd.
- Publisher: THQ
- Platform: Game Boy Advance
- Release: NA: September 6, 2005; EU: February 3, 2006
- Genre: Action
- Mode: Single player

Power Rangers S.P.D. is a side-scrolling beat-em-up video game developed by Natsume Co., Ltd. and published by THQ for the Game Boy Advance on September 6, 2005. It was the sixth Power Rangers video game to be published by THQ.

== Gameplay ==
Six different Rangers are playable, each with unique abilities. The Red Ranger can walk through enemies and obstacles; the Blue Ranger creates a force field to block attacks and prevent enemies from approaching; the Green Ranger tracks energy signatures to locate missing objects; the Yellow Ranger creates three duplicates of herself to increase her attack power; the Pink Ranger turns her hand into iron to punch through walls or defeat minor enemies with a single hit; and the Shadow Ranger creates an energy blade that damages multiple enemies at once.

The six Rangers fight minor enemies before encountering the main boss. The game also includes racing levels involving the Red, Yellow, and Pink Delta Runners; a targeting game similar to Space Invaders featuring the Green Delta Runner; a racing level involving R.I.C., the Rangers' robotic dog; and Megazord battle levels.

== Reception ==
Reception

Aggregate score
Aggregator	Score
GameRankings	55/100

Review scores
Publication	Score
GameZone	7/10
IGN	4/10

Power Rangers S.P.D. has a 55 percent rating on GameRankings, based on two reviews.

Anise Hollingshead of GameZone gave the game 7 out of 10, and praised the graphics, but criticized its "boring" backgrounds. Hollingshead wrote, "The controls are probably the best part of the game, and is where the design team shined. There is no collision detection to worry about in the main levels, and the jumping is superbly handled. This is the way wall-jumping should be in every game." Mark Bozon of IGN gave the game 4 out of 10, and criticized the basic gameplay but wrote, "While it is very difficult to capture the cinematic nature of the television show into the cramped space of a Game Boy cart, this is one area where Power Rangers SPD showed strength over previous Power Ranger titles."
