= Power Rangers Wild Force (video game) =

2002 video game

- Developer: Natsume Co., Ltd.
- Publisher: THQ
- Platform: Game Boy Advance
- Release: NA: August 19, 2002; EU: September 13, 2002
- Genre: Action video game
- Modes: Single player, multiplayer

Power Rangers Wild Force is a video game based on the television series of the same name, developed by Natsume and published by THQ for the Game Boy Advance in 2002.

== Gameplay ==
The player plays as one of six Rangers. Back up Rangers can be summoned for additional attack power throughout each level. The player fights Putrids until encountering the final boss in each level. After defeating the boss, the boss grows to giant size, and the player selects a Megazord combination to fight the large monster, in a series of Quick time Events. The game is played across 12 levels. Passwords are provided at the end of each level, allowing the player to resume a specific level by entering the correct password. A Battle Mode allows for up to four players to compete against each other.

== Reception ==
Reception

Aggregate score
Aggregator	Score
Metacritic	55/100

Review scores
Publication	Score
GameZone	6.1/10
IGN	5.5/10
M! Games	27%
Nintendo Power	2.6/5

The game received "mixed" reviews according to the review aggregation website Metacritic.
