= Shadow of the Ninja =

1990 video game

- North American box art
- Developer: Natsume
- Publishers: JP/NA: Natsume; EU: Taito
- Programmer: Kazuhiko Ishihara
- Artist: Shunichi Taniguchi
- Composers: Iku Mizutani; Kouichi Yamanishi
- Platform: Nintendo Entertainment System
- Release: JP: August 10, 1990; NA: December 1990; EU: July 25, 1991
- Genres: Platform, hack and slash
- Modes: Single-player, multiplayer

Shadow of the Ninja, originally released in Japan as Yami no Shigotonin Kage (闇(やみ)の仕事人(しごとにん) KAGE, The Dark Operative: Kage) and later released in Europe and Australia as Blue Shadow, is a 1990 hack and slash platform game developed and published by Natsume for the Nintendo Entertainment System. The game revolves around a pair of ninja sent to assassinate a dictator in a futuristic version of New York City. A port was planned for the Game Boy, but was released in a rebranded form as Ninja Gaiden Shadow. A remake, Shadow of the Ninja: Reborn, was released in 2024.

== Gameplay ==
Gameplay of Shadow of the Ninja, with Kaede (left) and Hayate (right)

In 2029, the evil Emperor Garuda has taken over the United States of America, building a stronghold in the middle of the nation's "largest city". To stop Garuda and avenge the innocent lives that were lost in his reign, two ninja masters from the Iga clan, Lord Hayate and Lady Kaede, are sent to infiltrate the dictator's well-guarded stronghold and kill him.

Shadow of the Ninja is a side-scrolling platform game that can be played by up to two players simultaneously, with one player controlling Hayate (a ninja in purple) and the other as Kaede (a kunoichi in orange). In either mode, the player can decide which character they want to control before the game begins. There are no actual performance differences between either character.

The player can run, crouch, climb ladders, attack, and jump like in most side-scrolling action games as well as hang onto an overhang and move under it. If the player has more than half of their vitality remaining, they can perform a special attack by holding a button for an extended period, summoning a thunderstorm that will damage all on-screen enemies, but at the cost of roughly half of their maximum vitality.

The player's default weapon is a katana, which can be traded for a kusarigama and vice versa. The kusarigama has a longer range than the katana and can be swung upwards diagonally and horizontally, but can only damage enemies from a specific distance and does not work as well at close range like the katana. If the player picks up a weapon they already have, its attack power will be strengthened by an increment of one level (with up to three attack levels). However, if the player takes too much damage, their weapon's strength will be reduced back to its previous level. There is also the possibility to use both weapons, if the player starts with the kusarigama and collects secret power-ups hidden in some levels. The player can also obtain throwable shuriken and hand grenades as well, both which can only be used as long as the player's supply lasts before the player reverts to using the katana or kusarigama. All four weapons are obtained by destroying item boxes scattered throughout each stage, along with vitality potions.

Shadow of the Ninja consists of five levels with fourteen stages, with the first four levels being divided into three stages and the final level into two. The player fights numerous types of enemy characters throughout each level, including bosses and sub-bosses. Once a boss has been defeated it will explode, this explosion will heal players the closer they are to it, since actually the same amount of health from one level will be carried to the next one until either recovered with potions or by dying. The game ends if the player loses all of their vitality and only five chances are provided to continue. If two players are playing the game, their continues will be shared.

== Release ==
American magazine GamePro ran a contest in 1991, awarding 10 readers with a free copy of the game; the magazine stated the 10 giveaway copies were an exclusive edition, which had a password feature not included in any of the retail versions. Shadow of the Ninja was re-released as a Virtual Console title for the Wii in 2010, the Nintendo 3DS and Wii U in 2015, and the Nintendo Switch via the Nintendo Classics service in 2020.

Natsume began development of a Game Boy version following the NES release. However, the publishing rights of the game were picked up by Tecmo and the title was subsequently revised as a Ninja Gaiden 1991 spin-off Ninja Gaiden Shadow, which was also developed by the Nagoya division of Natsume.

A remake, Shadow of the Ninja: Reborn, was released on August 29, 2024 for the Nintendo Switch, PlayStation 4, PlayStation 5, Windows, and Xbox Series X/S.

== Reception ==
Shadow of the Ninja was well received upon its release. The "Greatest Hits" special issue GamePro gave it a near-perfect score of 23/25 and called it "an above average ninja fare with top of the line graphics and fast-paced gameplay" and "a top flight, fast-paced action cart," while Electronic Gaming Monthly in particular praised the game's "superb" graphics and sound. Total! gave it a more reserved total rating of 74%, but added that "if this is the kind of game you're into, you won't find a better cartridge for your NES this side of Low G Man." Nintendo Power featured it in the 1991 article "Weird Heroes" for supposedly featuring the "first male-and-female team" in video game history.

Retrospectively, Hardcore Gaming 101's Kurt Kalata in 2006 called it "still an excellent game." Matt Allen from Nintendo Life and Jeremy Parish from USgamer were more critical in their reviews of the Virtual Console release, awarding it six stars out of ten and three stars out five, respectively. Lucas M. Thomas from IGN rated the VC release 7.0/10, opining it is "not quite as smooth or memorable as Gaiden, and it'll frustrate you a few times as only an NES action game could -- but its unique qualities, like two-player co-op support, compensate well for any of its shortcomings."

== See also ==
- Return of the Ninja
- Cyber Shadow
