= Idol Hakkenden =

1989 video game

- Cover art
- Developer: Natsume
- Publisher: Towa Chiki
- Producer: Kiyohiro Sada
- Programmers: Kou Ohira; Satoshi Yoshikawa
- Artist: Yutaka Kondo
- Composers: Kiyohiro Sada; Tomoo Misato
- Platform: Family Computer
- Release: JP: September 14, 1989
- Genres: Adventure, Interactive fiction
- Mode: Single-player

Idol Hakkenden (アイドル八犬伝) is a Japan-exclusive adventure game developed by Natsume and published by Towa Chiki in 1989 for the Family Computer.

== Plot ==
Sick and bedridden, the zaibatsu tycoon Tomiko senses that her death is near and must nominate an heir among her three granddaughters. To decide who will receive her whole fortune, she launches a challenge: whoever will give her best in the next three months will be the winner. Shizuka, the oldest granddaughter and owner of several business companies, and Reika, the second oldest and a genius scientist, are sure that it's going to be a battle between the two of them. However, Erika, the youngest, has a plan of her own: using her only talent, singing, she aims to break through as a super idol and to do so, she must first seek the help of seven other companions.

Meanwhile, a mysterious man called Dark Lord Iromono is on Erika's track, plotting to have her join his army and become an iromono talent instead.

== Gameplay ==
Erika, an aspiring musician and pop idol, must foil a plot that could ruin her music career. As a Japanese adventure game, players must select through menus of dialogue in order to determine her future. Friends (and sometimes rivals) of Erika give her advice on what to do next. The game's storytelling is remarkable for its hectic and humorous content, which often reflects on the nature of the in-game puzzles.

There are six songs in the game; all of them belonging to the J-pop genre. Erika must master them all in order to become the greatest idol in all of Japan. Lyrics are not sung by a voice actor; they are shown on the bottom of the screen instead.

== Title ==
The title Idol Hakkenden is a reference to the classic Japanese epic Nansō Satomi Hakkenden (南総里見八犬伝). The original tale follows the adventures of eight samurai warriors, each associated with a specific virtue. In Idol Hakkenden the concept is reimagined in the context of Japanese idol culture, with the story centering around a group of young girls instead.

== Music ==
The theme song for the game is entitled "Kimi wa Hoehoe Musume" (君はホエホエ娘), or "You're the Hoehoe Girl". The term "ホエホエ" (Hoehoe) is an onomatopoeic expression of cuteness or silliness, often used in a playful context. It was composed by Tomoo Misato with lyrics by Japanese filmmaker Minoru Kawasaki. The song is often mentioned as one of the earliest examples of a Denpa song, due to its nonsensical lyrics.

== Reception ==
Reception

Review scores
Publication	Score
Famitsu	5/10, 7/10, 7/10, 5/10
Family Computer Magazine	19.34/30
Famicom Hisshoubon	3/5
Shock B-Class Games' Revenge	Negative

The four reviewers in Famitsu gave the game a 5, 7, 7, and 5 rating respectively. with them noting that "in terms of difficulty it was a bit disappointing, but the game was ultimately a novel experience. In Famicom Hisshoubon, one reviewer complimented the game for its wide variety of music and beautiful graphics. Another said that the game was fun but was skeptical on recommend purchasing the title as the gameplay period was very short.

- A reader's poll by Family Computer Magazine reported a score of 19.34 out of 30.
- In the 1998 Japanese book The Amazing B-Game's Revenge, the author describes the graphics as "good enough for an old game," but criticizes it for its "outdated gags" and "wordplay so bad it makes you go limp."

In 2007, in a Japanese readers' poll of desired Famicom games to be re-released on the Wii, the game ranked 3rd, showing continued appreciation even after several years.
