= Towa Chiki =

Japanese toy company

Towa Chiki Corporation 株式会社トーワチキ
- Type: Public
- Founded: May 2, 1986
- Defunct: September 2001
- Fate: Liquidated
- Headquarters: Chiyoda, Tokyo, Japan
- Owner: Towa Enterprises Ltd. (70%)
- Parent: Towa San Electronics

Towa Chiki Corporation (株式会社トーワチキ, Kabushikigaisha Tōwa Chiki) was a Japanese toy company responsible for many Famicom games in the late 1980s and 1990s.

== Products ==
- TC-280 Transceiver (2,800 yen)
- TC-330 Transceiver
- TC-380 Transceiver (3,800 yen)
- TC-480 Transceiver (4,800 yen)
- To in Harokuma (9,800 yen)
- To in Haroinu (12,800 yen)

== Video games ==
=== Famicom ===
- Sherlock Holmes: Hakushaku Reijō Yūkai Jiken
- Elnark no Zaihou
- Meitantei Holmes: Kiri no London Satsujin Jiken
- A Week of Garfield
- Meitantei Holmes: M-Kara no Chousenjou
- Idol Hakkenden
- Dragon Fighter

=== Game Boy ===
- Taikyoku Renju
- Fish Dude

== See also ==
- Japanese asset price bubble

== Footnotes ==
Attachment of consolidated interim financial statements Notice of Interim Financial Report March 2002 Towa Meccs Corporation Ltd. (November 15, 2001)
