= Power Rangers Lightspeed Rescue (video game) =

1999 video game

- Developers: Mass Media (N64); Climax Studios (PS); Natsume (GBC)
- Publishers: THQ; Bandai America (Mac/Win)
- Platforms: Game Boy Color, Nintendo 64, PlayStation
- Release: 2000: Game Boy Color; NA: June 26, 2000; PAL: November 24, 2000 PlayStation, Nintendo 64; NA: September 27, 2000; PAL: December 1, 2000 (PS); PAL: December 8, 2000 (N64)
- Genres: Platformer, action, beat 'em up
- Modes: Single-player, multiplayer

Power Rangers Lightspeed Rescue is a video game based on the 8th season of the TV series Power Rangers Lightspeed Rescue. Four distinct versions of the game were produced for Game Boy Color, Nintendo 64, and PlayStation.

== Nintendo 64 version ==
The Nintendo 64 version features 3D action-based gameplay involving the Rangers, their vehicles, and Megazords. It supports 1 or 2 players simultaneously. Villains from the show, such as Diabolico, serve as antagonists; and the game features voice clips from the actual Power Rangers Lightspeed Rescue cast.The game is also compatible with the Nintendo Controller Pak for saving progress.

== PlayStation version ==
The PlayStation version is similar to the Nintendo 64 version in terms of graphics, but the gameplay differs significantly. It features the five main Rangers as playable characters, with the Titanium Ranger as an unlockable character. The game can be played in single-player or two-player mode and also includes voice clips from the Power Rangers Lightspeed Rescue cast. Once chosen, the player(s) remain as the selected Ranger(s) for the entire game. During Megazord battles, the player using controller one can operate the Supertrain Megazord, which is replaced by the Omega Megazord in the final stage. Another special feature is the password system, which allows players to enter cheat codes for infinite health, lives, continues, and powered-up attacks. Players can also unlock an art and picture gallery, start the game at any of the first six levels, and access the Titanium Ranger. The final stage of the game is only accessible if the player saves their progress on a PlayStation Memory Card after completing the penultimate stage.

== Game Boy Color version ==
The Game Boy Color version is a side-scrolling platformer. It features all five Rangers as playable characters and uses a password save system.

== Reception ==
Reception

Aggregate scores
Aggregator	Score		
Aggregator	GBC	N64	PS
GameRankings	51%	34%	57%
Metacritic	N/A	25/100	N/A

Review scores
Publication	Score		
Publication	GBC	N64	PS
AllGame	3.5/5	N/A	2.5/5
Computer and Video Games	N/A	N/A	2/5
Electronic Gaming Monthly	N/A	2/10	3/10
GameRevolution	N/A	N/A	D−
IGN	7/10	3/10	N/A
Jeuxvideo.com	14/20	N/A	10/20
N64 Magazine	N/A	9%	N/A
Nintendo Power	N/A	6.6/10	N/A
Official U.S. PlayStation Magazine	N/A	N/A	1.5/5
Video Games (DE)	3/5	14%	22%

The Nintendo 64 version received "generally unfavorable reviews" according to the review aggregation website Metacritic.
