= Power Rangers Time Force (video game) =

2001 video game

- Game Boy Color cover art featuring the main protagonists: (left to right) Yellow Time Force Ranger, Pink Time Force Ranger, Red Time Force Ranger, Green Time Force Ranger, and Blue Time Force Ranger.
- Developers: Natsume (GBC); Vicarious Visions, Engine Software (GBA); Climax Studios (PS)
- Publisher: THQ
- Platforms: Game Boy Color, Microsoft Windows, Game Boy Advance, PlayStation
- Release: Game Boy Color: NA: May 2, 2001; EU: November 23, 2001; Windows: NA: September 5, 2001; Game Boy Advance: NA: September 24, 2001; EU: November 23, 2001; PlayStation: NA: November 5, 2001; EU: December 7, 2001
- Genre: Action
- Mode: Single-player

Power Rangers Time Force is a video game based on the 9th season of the TV series, Power Rangers Time Force released in 2001 and published by THQ. The game was released for the Game Boy Color, Game Boy Advance, Microsoft Windows, and PlayStation.

== Game Boy Color version ==
The Game Boy Color version is a platforming side-scroller. The five Time Force rangers travel through time stopping enemies. The player can choose to play as any of the five main Time Force Rangers. The game also features Zord battles.

== Game Boy Advance version ==
The Game Boy Advance version is a beat 'em up side-scroller. This version follows the show more closely. The player must travel through various stages to stop the evil Ransik. All five Time Force Rangers are playable in the game. The Quantum Ranger is playable when the player earns the Quantum Morpher power-up, allowing the Ranger the player is controlling to use the powers of the Quantum Ranger. The game also features Zord battles, however, only the Time Force Megazord in mode red is playable in these battles. This game is similar to the 2003 Power Rangers: Ninja Storm video game for GBA.

== PlayStation version ==
The PlayStation version, developed by Climax Studios is a 3D action game that featured single and 2 player battles, the latter having only the Megazords and the main bosses. The player can find a Time Artifact hidden in each level, and a health bar bonus is awarded if the level is completed within the time limit. All seven artifacts must be collected to unlock the Quantum Ranger.

== Reception ==
Reception

Aggregate score
Aggregator	Score		
Aggregator	GBA	PC	PS
GameRankings	59%	N/A	67%

Review scores
Publication	Score		
Publication	GBA	PC	PS
4Players	N/A	N/A	47%
AllGame	3/5	N/A	1/5
GameStar	N/A	9%	N/A
IGN	6/10	N/A	N/A
Jeuxvideo.com	8/20	N/A	N/A
M! Games	36%	N/A	26%
Nintendo Power	3.5/5	N/A	N/A
PC Games (DE)	N/A	13%	N/A

The Game Boy Advance and PlayStation versions received mixed reviews.
