= Power Rangers Ninja Storm (video game) =

- European cover art
- Developer(s): Natsume (GBA); Artech Studios (PC)
- Publisher(s): THQ
- Platform(s): Game Boy Advance, Windows
- Release: NA: September 9, 2003 (GBA); NA: September 12, 2003 (PC); EU: November 7, 2003
- Genre(s): Beat 'em up (GBA); Action (PC)
- Mode(s): Single-player

Power Rangers Ninja Storm is a set of two video games based on the Power Rangers Ninja Storm TV show for Game Boy Advance and Windows. Developed by Natsume, the Game Boy Advance version is a side-scrolling action game with beat 'em up elements. The Windows version, developed by Artech, features a collection of minigames with arcade-style gameplay.

== Gameplay ==
All six Ninja Storm Rangers are playable, each with their own abilities. The Red Wind Ranger's special attack is Hawk Blaster, Blue Wind Ranger's special attack is Sonic Fin, Yellow Wind Ranger's special attack is Lion Hammer, Crimson Thunder Ranger's special attack is Crimson Blaster, Navy Thunder Ranger's special attack is Navy Antler and finally the Green Samurai Ranger's special attack is Shuriken Spin.

The player selects one of the six rangers, which affects the play level. Minor enemies appear first followed by the main boss for the level. After defeating the boss, they grow to giant size, and the player takes control of one of three Megazords (determined by the ranger selected: Red, Blue, or Yellow Ranger uses the Storm Megazord; Crimson or Navy Ranger the Thunder Megazord; and Green Ranger uses Samurai Star Megazord). Megazord levels feature quick time events where the player must press the correct button shown onscreen simultaneously with the directional button corresponding to the onscreen location of the button commands to launch successful attacks against the opponent.

== Reception ==
Reception

Aggregate score
| Aggregator | Score |
|---|---|
| Metacritic | 55/100 |

Review scores
| Publication | Score |
|---|---|
| GameZone | 5/10 |
| Jeuxvideo.com | 7/20 |
| Nintendo Power | 2.9/5 |

The Game Boy Advance version received "mixed" reviews according to the review aggregation website Metacritic.
