= Shin Kidō Senki Gundam Wing: Endless Duel =

1996 video game

- Developer: Natsume Co., Ltd.
- Publisher: Bandai
- Producer: Norihiko Ushimura
- Designers: Kunio Suzuki; Shunichi Taniguchi
- Programmers: Hiromichi Komuro; Toshiyasu Miyabe
- Composers: Haruo Ohashi; Hiroyuki Iwatsuki
- Series: Mobile Suit Gundam Wing
- Engine: Mighty Morphin Power Rangers: The Fighting Edition
- Platform: Super Famicom
- Release: JP: March 29, 1996
- Genres: Fighting; Mecha Sci-fi
- Modes: Single-player, multiplayer

Shin Kidō Senki Gundam Wing: Endless Duel (Note: Japanese: 新機動戦記ガンダムW(ウイング): ENDLESS DUEL(しんきどうせんきガンダムウイング: エンドレスデュエル), Hepburn: Shin Kidō Senki Gandamu Wingu: Endoresu De~yueru; lit. "New Mobile Report Gundam Wing: Endless Duel") is a 1996 fighting video game developed by Natsume Co., Ltd. and published in Japan by Bandai for the Super Famicom. It is the first game to be based on the Mobile Suit Gundam Wing anime series. Set in the year After Colony 195, players take control of a pilot from the Colony Liberation Organization or the Organization of the Zodiac. Its gameplay consists of one-on-one fights, with a main four-button configuration, featuring special moves, as well as three playable modes.

Gundam Wing: Endless Duel was released during the boom of fighting games after the launch of Street Fighter II as one of the last titles to appear on the Super Famicom. The game was developed by Tengo Project, a team within Natsume Co., Ltd. who previously developed The Ninja Warriors (1994), Wild Guns and Mighty Morphin Power Rangers: The Fighting Edition (1995). The staff reused the same engine from Power Rangers: The Fighting Edition for Endless Duel but with some improvements.

Shin Kidō Senki Gundam Wing: Endless Duel was met with positive reception from critics who reviewed it as an import title and regarded as one of the best fighting games on the Super Famicom; praise was given to the graphics, audio, Capcom-style gameplay system, ability to switch between fighting styles and overall improvements made over Mighty Morphin Power Rangers: The Fighting Edition but criticism was geared to its low character roster. Gundam Wing: Endless Duel received two follow-ups for PlayStation in the form of Gundam: The Battle Master (1997) and Gundam: Battle Assault (1998), with the latter featuring characters from Gundam Wing. Endless Duel has since been featured at fighting game events as a side tournament.

== Gameplay ==
Gameplay screenshot showcasing a match between the Wing and Deathscythe units.

Shin Kidō Senki Gundam Wing: Endless Duel is a fighting game similar to Kidō Butōden G-Gundam and Street Fighter II set in the Mobile Suit Gundam Wing anime series, taking place in the year After Colony 195. In the game, players control either one of ten playable characters on their mobile suits representing the Colony Liberation Organization and the Organization of the Zodiac. Every Gundam suit has different "ability ratings" mirroring the ones in the series. It features three modes: Story, Versus and Trial.

In the single-player story mode, the player fights a series of battles depending on the chosen Gundam against opponents. In versus mode, the player fights against human opponents in one-on-one matches and the fighter who manages to deplete the health bar of the opponent wins the first bout. The first to win two bouts becomes the winner of the match. Each round is timed, which can be adjusted or deactivated in the game options; if both fighters still have health remaining when time expires, the fighter with more health wins the round. In trial mode, players choose any Gundam mech to participate in an endless series of matches with increasing difficulty until the player is defeated.

During a match, players are able to switch between weapon and melee fighting styles. All pilots have a "vulcan gun/machine cannon" attack, which also uses energy and targets the opponent based on distance. Each pilot have an energy counter underneath their health bars, which is used to perform powerful versions of special moves. Every pilot has one or two "super special" attacks that requires energy and plays a sound right before commencing, giving the opponent a split second to respond. The player must block hits, execute special or super special attacks, land hits against an opponent or block attacks to recover a large portion of energy. Players are able to execute dashes, air blocking, air dashes and chain combos similar to fighting games by Capcom like X-Men: Children of the Atom. Unique to Gundam Wing: Endless Duel is the "vernier" mechanic, which allows the player's mech hover down briefly after using an air dash by holding down to attack an opponent on the ground. "Vernier" can also be used to perform high jumps.

== Development and release ==
Shin Kidō Senki Gundam Wing: Endless Duel was the first title to be based on the Mobile Suit Gundam Wing anime series and was released during the boom of fighting games after the launch of Street Fighter II on Super Famicom. Development was handled by the Tengo Project team at Natsume Co., Ltd., who previously developed The Ninja Warriors (1994), Wild Guns and Mighty Morphin Power Rangers: The Fighting Edition (1995). The staff reused the same game engine from Power Rangers: The Fighting Edition for Gundam Wing: Endless Duel, albeit with some exclusive improvements added. Norihiko Ushimura headed its development as producer. Shunichi Taniguchi served as planner, while Toshiyasu Miyabe and Hiromichi Komuro acted as co-programmers of the game. Taniguchi also worked as co-designer alongside Kunio Suzuki. The music was co-composed by Haruo Ohashi and Hiroyuki Iwatsuki. Iwatsuki stated that he used PC-98, a MIDI driver called UNYA, a Roland Sound Canvas and a Roland W-30 workstation keyboard for audio. The intro theme is a synthesized version of "Rhythm Emotion", the second opening song for the series.

Gundam Wing: Endless Duel was released on March 29, 1996, making it one of the last titles to appear on Super Famicom and was housed in a 16-megabit (2 MB) cartridge. Prior to launch, it was showcased to attendees of Shoshinkai 1995. A strategy guide for the game was published by Kodansha in April 1996. Endless Duel was never released outside of Japan but a fan English translation patch was released in 2002.

== Reception and legacy ==
Reception

Review scores
Publication	Score
Famitsu	6/10, 5/10, 6/10, 6/10
Nintendo Life	8/10
PSX Extreme	8/10

Shin Kidō Senki Gundam Wing: Endless Duel garnered positive reception from critics who reviewed it as an import title. However, four reviewers of Famitsu gave the game a "less than impressive" outlook. In a poll taken by Family Computer Magazine, Gundam Wing: Endless Duel received a 22.9 out of 30 score from the public, indicating a popular following. According to Famitsu, Endless Duel sold over 34,641 copies in its first week on the market. The title sold approximately 52,232 copies during its lifetime in Japan.

IGN's David Smith found Shin Kidō Senki Gundam Wing: Endless Duel to be "bizarrely amusing". The Electric Playground's James Tapia regarded Gundam Wing: Endless Duel as a "Super Famicom (Super NES) classic", noting the speed of its battles and familiar character roster. José Ángel Ciudad of Spanish magazine GamesTech praised its visuals for Super Famicom standards, audio, gameplay and "chain combo" mechanic reminiscent of Capcom's Versus series. Łukasz Ossowski of Polish publication PSX Extreme commended the gameplay and audiovisual presentation, calling Endless Duel as one of the best fighting games on the console. Hardcore Gaming 101 agreed, giving positive remarks to the Capcom-style gameplay system and audio design, regarding it as one of the best fighting titles on the platform.

Alberto Canen of Brazilian website Nintendo Blast commended its fast gameplay reminiscent of Darkstalkers and Street Fighter Alpha, addition of the "vulcan gun/machine cannon" mechanic and balanced character roster, regarding Shin Kidō Senki Gundam Wing: Endless Duel as one of the best fighting games on Super Famicom. Likewise, Nintendo Life's Gonçalo Lopes noted the overall improvements Natsume Co., Ltd. made over Mighty Morphin Power Rangers: The Fighting Edition's engine in Gundam Wing: Endless Duel, praising the detailed graphics compared to Kidō Butōden G-Gundam, fighting system and controls but criticized its low roster of playable characters and lamented the lack of a western release. HobbyConsolas's David Martínez also concurred with the lack of a western release but commended Endless Duel's visuals, ability to switch between weapon and melee fighting styles, as well as the improvements made from Power Rangers: The Fighting Edition.

Following the release of Shin Kidō Senki Gundam Wing: Endless Duel, 2D fighting games based on Gundam would be developed by Natsume Co., Ltd. Gundam Wing: Endless Duel was followed up by two fighting titles on PlayStation called Gundam: The Battle Master (1997) and Gundam: Battle Assault (1998), the latter of which featured characters from Gundam Wing. Endless Duel has since been featured in competitive play at fighting game tournaments as a side event like CEOtaku, CEO and Climax of Night [re:run].
