= Mighty Morphin Power Rangers: The Fighting Edition =

1995 video game

- North American cover art
- Developer(s): Natsume Co., Ltd.
- Publisher(s): Bandai
- Designer(s): Kunio Suzuki
- Composer(s): Hiroyuki Iwatsuki
- Platform(s): Super NES
- Release: NA: September 1995; EU: 1995
- Genre(s): Fighting
- Mode(s): Single-player, multiplayer

Mighty Morphin Power Rangers: The Fighting Edition is a 2D competitive fighting video game based on the Mighty Morphin Power Rangers television series that was released exclusively for the Super Nintendo Entertainment System developed by Natsume Co., Ltd. and published by Bandai in 1995. Unlike previous Power Rangers video games, which had the player controlling the titular heroes, the player controls their giant robots (known as Zords) in this title. A bootleg Genesis port is known to exist, though who actually made it is currently unknown.

== Gameplay ==
Gameplay screenshot showcasing a match between Thunder Megazord and Lord Zedd.

Fighting Edition follows the same rules and format of most 2D fighting games, particularly Capcom’s Cyberbots: Fullmetal Madness (1995).

The player(s) objectives are to defeat opponents in a best two-out-of-three match using their character's standard and special moves. The player has four basic attack buttons (two punch buttons and two weapon buttons) and a set of command-based special moves unique to each character. The player can grab and throw their opponent like other fighting games, but if two characters attempt to do this at the same time, they will wrestle each other until one overpowers the other.

Below each character's vitality gauge is a power gauge that automatically fills up and resets during battle. If the player performs a special move at the exact moment the gauge is filled, their power level will increase by one level, allowing the player to perform stronger attacks. If the player manages to increase their power level a third time, the gauge will be temporarily replaced by a thunderbolt symbol, allowing the player to perform a super move during this period.

There are three game modes in Fighting Edition: a Story Mode where the player fights against the computer in a series of story-based matches; a Fighting Mode, where the player goes against another player or the computer (or have two computer opponents fight each other); and a Trial Mode where a single player must defeat as many opponents as possible without losing.

== Characters ==
There are a total of nine fighters in Fighting Edition, which are derived primarily from the TV show's second and third seasons. Only the Thunder Megazord and the Mega Tigerzord are selectable in the Story Mode and the rest are fought throughout the course of the game, with Ivan Ooze (the antagonist of Mighty Morphin Power Rangers: The Movie) as the final adversary. The other characters are immediately selectable in Fighting Mode and Trial Mode with the exception of Ivan Ooze, who is only playable in Fighting Mode via a secret code given for completing Story Mode on the hard difficulty setting.

The nine playable characters in the game are:

- Thunder Megazord

- Mega Tigerzord

- Ninja Megazord

- Shogun Megazord

- Goldar

- Lord Zedd

- Ivan Ooze (Final Boss)

- Silver Horns

- Lipsyncher

== Development ==
The music to the game was scored by Hiroyuki Iwatsuki. The developers would later use the same engine for the Super Famicom fighting game Shin Kidō Senki Gundam Wing: Endless Duel.

== Reception ==
Reception

Review scores
Publication	Score
GamePro	11.5/20
M! Games	44%
Total!	2-

GamePro's Bruised Lee gave the game a mostly negative review, citing a lack of depth and originality, choppy animation, slow-moving characters, dull backgrounds, and sound effects which are mostly recycled from other video games. However, they did praise the detailed character sprites and easy controls and concluded that "True Ranger fans or beginner fighters may enjoy this simple game."
