= Natsume Atari =

Japanese video game company

Winning Entertainment Group Inc.
- Formerly: Natsume Co., Ltd. (1987–2013); Natsume Atari Co., Ltd. (2013–2025)
- Type: Private K.K.
- Industry: Video game
- Founded: 20 October 1987; 39 years ago
- Headquarters: Shinjuku, Tokyo, Japan
- Key people: Takashi Matsumoto (CEO, Natsume-Atari)
- Products: Power Rangers; Medarot
- Revenue: 719,000,000 yen
- Number of employees: 150
- Website: www.natsumeatari.co.jp

Winning Entertainment Group Inc. (Japanese: Winning Entertainment Group株式会社; WEG) is a Japanese video game developer and publisher based in Shinjuku, Tokyo, Japan, known for developing licensed titles and mobile games.

The company was founded as Natsume Co., Ltd. (Japanese: ナツメ株式会社)in 1987. In 1995, its American division Natsume Inc. split to become an independent company. The name "Natsume" was retained by both companies in their respective countries. In 2013, Natsume Co., Ltd. renamed itself Natsume Atari Co., Ltd. (Japanese: ナツメアタリ株式会社) following a merger with its subsidiary Atari Inc. (a pachinko company, not to be confused with the American game company) that year. The company adopted its current name on January 1, 2026.

== Products ==
During the NES and SNES era, Natsume Co., Ltd developed numerous titles, often licensed, such as Power Rangers. Natsume Inc published a wide range of titles, including those developed by Natsume Co. Ltd., such as S.C.A.T., Wild Guns, Shadow of the Ninja and Pocky & Rocky. Natsume Co., Ltd also developed the Medarot games up until the end of the GBA era, and Natsume Inc. published some of them outside of Japan.

A sizeable amount of Natsume Co., Ltd products were video games it developed for other publishers. Some of its biggest clients over the years included Imagineer, Bandai, THQ and Taito. Most of Natsume's video games, as a sub-contractor, were original titles, but it occasionally developed some ports as well.

== Corporate divisions ==
Logo of Natsume Co., Ltd., which continues to be used by Natsume Inc.

Natsume Co., Ltd. was founded in Japan on October 20, 1987. It became the parent company of Natsume Inc., founded in May 1988. Natsume Inc. started publishing video games in 1990. By 1995, Natsume Inc. had broken away into its own company and is separately owned and operated.

In October 2002, Natsume Co., Ltd. founded the pachinko company Atari Inc. (not to be confused with the American game company) in Osaka, which specialized in developing slot and pinball machines. On May 6, 2005, Natsume Solution began operation in Shinjuku. This division specializes on web site development, providing mobile solutions/services and developing web systems. On March 1, 2006, Natsume Solution was merged with Evolve.

Logo of Natsume-Atari

Natsume Co., Ltd. changed its name to Natsume Atari in October 2013, and it is not directly connected to Natsume Inc. or its subsidiary Natsume Inc. Japan. Despite their corporate split off, Nastume-Atari and Natsume Inc. continued to collaborate on a number of occasions. Composed of veteran developers with an average age of 54 (as of 2022), its permanent members are composer Hiroyuki Iwatsuki, designer Shunichi Taniguchi, and programmer Toshiyasu Miyabe. Its works include Wild Guns Reloaded, The Ninja Saviors: Return of the Warriors and Pocky & Rocky Reshrined. Within the company exists Tengo Project, an internal development team established as early as 2008 for the production of Omega Five, which has shifted its focus to modern revivals of classic video games.

The company again changed its name to Winning Entertainment Group on January 1, 2026, to "mark a fresh chapter". Natsume-Atari continues to be the name for the international operations in Europe and the Middle East, notably Bahrain, where the company has an office. Natsume Inc. still remains an affiliate company.

== Works ==
=== Pre-split Natsume ===
These are games produced while Natsume Inc., was still operating as a subsidiary of Natsume Co., Ltd. Natsume Inc. would publish only Natsume Co., Ltd.'s games until becoming independent in the mid-90s.

Year	Title	Publisher(s)	Platform(s)	Details	Ref.
1988	Touhouken Bunroku	Natsume	Famicom	Japan only	
1989	Majoriko Inbikai Inbizone	Natsume	PC-88	Japan only	
1989	Idol Hakkenden	Towa Chiki	Famicom	Japan only	
1989	Mitsume ga Tooru: The Three-Eyed One Comes Here	Natsume	MSX	Japan only	
1989	Dungeon Magic: Sword of the Elements	Natsume/Taito	NES		
1989	Abadox: The Deadly Inner War	Natsume/Milton Bradley	NES		
1989	Quarter Back Scramble: American Football Game	Pony Canyon	Famicom	Japan only	
1989	Chuugoku Janshi Story: Tonpuu	Natsume	Famicom	Japan only	
1990	Amazing Penguin	Natsume	Game Boy		
1990	Power Blade	Taito	NES	Co-developed with Taito	
1990	Dragon Fighter	Towa Chiki/SOFEL	NES		
1990	S.C.A.T.: Special Cybernetic Attack Team	Natsume/Infogrames	NES		
1990	Palamedes	Hot-B	NES		
1990	Shadow of the Ninja	Natsume/Taito	NES		
1990	World Boxing	TSS	Famicom	Japan only	
1991	Koufuku o Yobu Game: Dora Dora Dora	Natsume	Famicom	Japan only	
1991	Chōjin Sentai Jetman	Angel	Famicom	Japan only	
1991	Ninja Gaiden Shadow	Tecmo	Game Boy		
1991	Spanky's Quest	Taito (GB), Natsume (SNES)	Game Boy, Super NES		
1991	Tail 'Gator	VAP/Natsume	Game Boy		
1991	Elevator Action	Taito	Game Boy		
1991	Hana Tāka Daka!?	Taito	PC Engine	Japan only	
1991	Advanced Dungeons & Dragons: Heroes of the Lance	Pony Canyon	NES		
1991	Shatterhand	Angel/Jaleco	NES		
1991	Chaos World	Natsume	Famicom	Japan only	
1992	Don Doko Don 2	Taito	Famicom	Japan only	
1992	The Jetsons: Cogswell's Caper!	Taito/Mattel	NES		
1992	Mitsume ga Tōru	Tomy	Famicom	Japan only	
1992	Pocky & Rocky	Natsume	Super NES		
1992	Power Blade 2	Taito	NES	Co-developed with Taito	
1992	Sagaia	Sega (Note: Published by Sega but subcontracted to Natsume by Taito.)	Master System	Europe and Brazil only; based on the Sega Genesis port	
1992	Special Criminal Investigation	Sega	Master System	Europe and Brazil only	
1992	Toukon Club	Jaleco	Famicom	Japan only	
1993	Jantei Monogatari 3: Saver Angels	Atlus	PC Engine CD-ROM²	Japan only	
1993	Renegade	Sega	Master System	Europe, Brazil and Australia only	
1993	Zen-Nippon Pro Wrestling	Masaya	Super Famicom	Japan only	
1993	Zen-Nippon Pro Wrestling Dash: Sekai Saikyō Tag	Masaya	Super Famicom	Updated version; Japan only	
1993	Ghost Sweeper Mikami: Joreishi wa Nice Body	Banalex	Super Famicom	Japan only	
1994	Fortune Quest	Zamuse	Super Famicom	Japan only	
1994	Pocky & Rocky 2	Natsume/Ocean Software	Super NES		
1994	Wild Guns	Natsume/Titus Software	Super NES		
1994	Natsume Championship Wrestling	Natsume	Super NES	Heavily based on Zen-Nippon Wrestling Dash	
1994	The Ninja Warriors	Taito/Titus	Super NES		
1994	Mighty Morphin Power Rangers	Bandai	Super NES		
1994	Shimono Masaki no Fishing to Bassing	Natsume	Super Famicom	Japan only	
1994	Kagayake! Kirakira Senshi Risky Jewel	Natsume	PC-88	Japan only	

=== Post-split ===
Since splitting from Natsume Inc., WEG has mostly acted as a developer – although it has also published some games, notably in the Medarot series.

Year	Title	Publisher(s)	Platform(s)	Details	Ref.
1995	Mighty Morphin Power Rangers: The Movie	Bandai	Super NES		
1995	Mighty Morphin Power Rangers: The Fighting Edition	Bandai	Super NES		
1996	Shin Kidō Senki Gundam Wing: Endless Duel	Bandai	Super Famicom	Japan only	
1996	Power Rangers Zeo: Battle Racers	Bandai	Super NES		
1997	Casper	KSS	Super Famicom	Japan only	
1997	Gekisō Sentai Carranger: Zenkai! Racer Senshi	Bandai	Super Famicom	Japan only	
1997	Medarot: Kuwagata Version	Imagineer	Game Boy		
1997	Medarot: Kabuto Version	Imagineer	Game Boy		
1998	Medarot: Parts Collection	Imagineer	Game Boy		
1999	Medarot: Perfect Edition	Imagineer	Wonderswan	Japan only	
1999	Medarot: Parts Collection 2	Imagineer	Game Boy	Japan only	
1999	WWF WrestleMania 2000	THQ/Asmik Ace	Game Boy Color		
1999	Hole in One Golf	Natsume Inc.	Game Boy Color		
1999	Bass Masters Classic	THQ	Game Boy Color		
2000	Tony Hawk's Pro Skater	Activision	Game Boy Color		
2000	Tony Hawk's Pro Skater 2	Activision	Game Boy Color		
2000	Power Rangers Lightspeed Recue	THQ	Game Boy Color		
2000	Dragon Dance	Crave Entertainment	Game Boy Color		
2000	Keitai Denjū Telefang	Smilesoft	Game Boy Color	Japan only	
2000	Medarot Card Robottle	Imagineer	Game Boy Color	Japan only	
2001	Croc 2	THQ	Game Boy Color		
2001	Action Man: Search for Base X	THQ	Game Boy Color		
2001	Power Rangers Time Force	THQ	Game Boy Color		
2001	Shaun Palmer's Pro Snowboarder	Activision O2	Game Boy Advance		
2001	WWF Road to WrestleMania	THQ	Game Boy Advance		
2001	Monsters, Inc.	THQ	Game Boy Advance		
2002	Keitai Denjū Telefang II	Smilesoft	Game Boy Advance	Japan only	
2002	Medabots AX	Natsume Inc.	Game Boy Advance		
2002	Medabots: Metabee and Rokusho	Imagineer	Game Boy Advance		
2002	Power Rangers Wild Force	THQ	Game Boy Advance		
2002	WWE Road to WrestleMania X8	THQ	Game Boy Advance		
2003	Medabots Infinity	Natsume Inc.	GameCube		
2003	Power Rangers Ninja Storm	THQ	Game Boy Advance		
2003	Buffy the Vampire Slayer: Wrath of the Darkhul King	THQ	Game Boy Advance		
2004	Gundam SEED: Battle Assault	Bandai	Game Boy Advance		
2004	WWE Survivor Series	THQ	Game Boy Advance		
2004	Power Rangers: Dino Thunder	THQ	Game Boy Advance		
2005	Fullmetal Alchemist: Dual Sympathy	Bandai/Destineer/Empire Interactive	Nintendo DS		
2005	Power Rangers S.P.D.	THQ	Game Boy Advance		
2006	Nicktoons: Battle for Volcano Island	THQ	Nintendo DS		
2006	Kirby: Squeak Squad	Nintendo	Nintendo DS	Co-developed with Flagship and HAL Laboratory	
2007	Nicktoons: Attack of the Toybots	THQ	Nintendo DS		
2008	SpongeBob SquarePants Featuring Nicktoons: Globs of Doom	Play THQ	Nintendo DS		
2009	Kamen Rider: Dragon Knight	D3 Publisher	Nintendo DS		
2011	Nikoli's Pencil Puzzle	Hudson Soft	Nintendo 3DS		
2014	Godzilla	Bandai Namco Games	PlayStation 3, PlayStation 4		
2017	Little Witch Academia: Chamber of Time	Bandai Namco Entertainment	PlayStation 4, Windows		
2018	Girls und Panzer: Dream Tank Match	Bandai Namco Entertainment	PlayStation 4, Nintendo Switch		
2018	Nari Kids Park: Hugtto! Precure	Bandai Namco Games	Nintendo Switch		
2018	The Seven Deadly Sins: Knights of Britannia	Bandai Namco Games	PlayStation 4		
2020	Kamen Rider: Memory of Heroez	Bandai Namco Entertainment	Nintendo Switch, PlayStation 4		
2022	Eiyuden Chronicle: Rising	505 Games	Nintendo Switch, PlayStation 4, PlayStation 5, Windows, Xbox One, Xbox Series X/S	Assistance by Rabbit & Bear Studios	
2023	SD Shin Kamen Rider Rumble	Bandai Namco Entertainment	Nintendo Switch, Windows		
2024	Penny Blood: Hellbound	Yukikaze	PlayStation 5, Windows, Xbox Series X/S	Co-developed with Studio Wildrose and Yukikaze	
2024	Reynatis	FuRyu/NIS America	Nintendo Switch, PlayStation 4, PlayStation 5, Windows	Co-developed with FuRyu	

=== Tengo Project ===
Year	Title	Publisher(s)	Platform(s)	Details	Ref.
2008	Omega Five	Hudson Soft	Xbox 360		
2016	Wild Guns Reloaded	Natsume Co. (JP), Natsume Inc. (WW)	PlayStation 4, Windows, Nintendo Switch	Based on Wild Guns (1994)	
2019	The Ninja Saviors: Return of the Warriors	Taito (JP and PC), ININ Games (WW)	Nintendo Switch, PlayStation 4, Windows	Based on The Ninja Warriors (1994)	
2022	Pocky & Rocky Reshrined	Taito (JP), Natsume Inc. (WW), Natsume Atari (PC), ININ Games (Xbox)	Nintendo Switch, PlayStation 4, Windows, Xbox Series X/S	Based on Pocky & Rocky (1992)	
2024	Shadow of the Ninja Reborn	Natsume Atari (JP), ININ Games (WW)	Nintendo Switch, PlayStation 4, PlayStation 5, Windows, Xbox Series X/S	Based on Shadow of the Ninja (1990)	
