= Hitoshi Akamatsu =

Japanese video game designer

- 赤松仁司
- Occupations: Video game programmer; director; designer
- Years active: 1983-1997
- Known for: Castlevania

Hitoshi Akamatsu (Japanese: 赤松仁司, Hepburn: Akamatsu Hitoshi) is a Japanese video game designer and programmer. He is most known for his work creating and directing the original trilogy of Castlevania games on the NES.

Because of Konami's concerns about other studios headhunting their talent, many employees had to be credited under pseudonyms in their titles. Pseudonyms used by Akamatsu include Trans Fishers, Narunopapa and Vram Stoker.

== Career ==
Akamatsu started working at Konami as early as 1983. The oldest known game that he worked on at Konami was titled Finalizer: Super Transformation, released in 1985. After being moved from Konami's arcade development division to their home console development team, he began work as the director of the game Castlevania.

The world of Castlevania was thought up by Akamatsu, who took inspiration from various western films. The main character, Simon Belmont, was given a whip as a weapon inspired by film Raiders of the Lost Ark. A former co-worker recounted that Akamatsu was very particular about the game's controls and game balance. He stated that Akamatsu designed each of the game's sub-weapons with utility, and gauged which ones were the strongest as the last ones that would be available to the players. They recounted that Akamatsu once joked that Castlevania was more fair than Super Mario Bros., as Simon can survive multiple hits, while Mario dies from one.

Akamatsu would go on to direct the game's two sequels on the NES, Castlevania II: Simon's Quest and Castlevania III: Dracula's Curse. For Simon's Quest, Akamatsu stated the nonlinear gameplay was based on The Maze of Galious. For Dracula's Curse, Akamatsu stated the quality of the game was an attempt to "outdo" Konami's Teenage Mutant Ninja Turtles game.

Akamatsu would work on other NES titles during his tenure at Konami. He would give an interview for the The Goonies II, which he served as director for. Akamatsu is quoted as saying, "Game ideas can be gotten from anywhere. Not just movies, music or sports, but also from the littlest things in everyday life, such as trying to slip out of school in order to play. That's sufficient enough for one game."

At the start of the 1990s, Akamatsu went back to Konami's arcade game development division, where he worked on several titles before moving to work at one of Konami's arcade game centers as a clerk in 1993. The reasons for this specific move are uncertain. Masaaki Kukino stated that it was possibly due to Akamatsu struggling as a director.

Akamatsu left Konami sometime between 1993 and 1997, and went to go work for another studio, Vingt et un Systems, where he would work on various fishing games, including his final known credit: Tsuridō: Umitsurihen. Akamatsu would leave the gaming industry entirely sometime in the early 2000s.

== Ludography ==
Year	Title	Role	Note	Ref(s)
1985	Finalizer	Programmer	Uncredited	
1986	Castlevania	Director, Writer	Credited as "Trans Fishers" and "Vram Stoker"	
1987	The Goonies II	Director, Programmer		
1987	Castlevania II: Simon's Quest	Director	Credited as "Invincibility"	
1987	Dragon Scroll	Unknown	Uncredited	
1988	Exciting Soccer: Konami Cup	Special Thanks		
1998	Jarinko Chie	Unknown senior role	Uncredited	
1989	Castlevania III: Dracula's Curse	Director		
1990	Surprise Attack	Program Design		
1990	Snake's Revenge	Programmer		
1992	Asterix	Main programmer	Credited as "Narunopapa"	
1997	Tsuridō: Umitsurihen	Director		
