= Kinuyo Yamashita =

Japanese composer and musician

- Born: 31 December 1965 (age 60); Amagasaki, Hyōgo, Japan
- Genre: Video game music
- Occupations: Composer, musician
- Instruments: Piano, saxophone
- Years active: 1986–2010

Kinuyo Yamashita (山下 絹代, Yamashita Kinuyo) is a Japanese composer and musician known for her contributions in video games. Her best known soundtrack is Konami's Castlevania, which was also her debut work. She was co-credited with Satoe Terashima under the pseudonym James Banana for her work on the Nintendo Entertainment System version of the game. This pseudonym was a pun of the name James Bernard, the composer of the 1958 film Dracula.

== Life ==
Yamashita was born in Amagasaki, Hyōgo, Japan. She began playing the piano at the age of four and took piano lessons as a child. After studying electronic engineering at the two-year college Osaka Electro-Communication University, she graduated in 1986 and went to work for Konami. After leaving Konami, Yamashita established a career as an independent composer. She moved to the United States in 2010, and currently resides with her husband in Montague, New Jersey.

== Career ==
In 1986, Yamashita and Satoe Terashima composed the music to the video game Castlevania, which was her first composition. The composition of the music was made under strict hardware constraints of the Famicom hardware. Yamashita established the format for much of the music in Castlevania games, which are fast beats as well as the piece Vampire Killer, which appears in many of the games of the series. After her success in composing the Castlevania soundtrack, Yamashita composed for other games with Konami, including Esper Dream, Arumana no Kiseki, Stinger, Maze of Galious, Knightmare III: Shalom, and Parodius. She was part of the original Konami Kukeiha Club in-house band. In 1989, she left Konami to become a freelance composer.

As an independent composer, Yamashita continued to score soundtracks for video games, including Mega Man X3, but she also worked on various Natsume Co., Ltd. games, including Power Blade, the Medabot series, Zen-Nippon Pro Wrestling series, Bass Masters Classic (Game Boy Color), Power Rangers: Lightspeed Rescue (GBC), WWF WrestleMania 2000 (GBC), among others. Yamashita continued to compose independently in the new millennium, working on titles such as Buffy the Vampire Slayer (Game Boy Advance), Croc 2 (GBC), Monsters, Inc. (GBA), WWF Road to WrestleMania (GBA), Power Rangers: Dino Thunder (GBA), Keitai Denjū Telefang (GBC), and other games in the Medabot series.

From 1991 to 1995, Yamashita formed a duo ensemble called "Honey Honey" which performed live covers of American Pop and Jazz music. She played the piano, alto saxophone and sang background vocals. Yamashita also composed songs for Japanese artists under the independent label Rocketeers and R&B songs independently for American artists.

In 2009, Yamashita completed the arrangement for "Stage 4" on the Dodonpachi Dai-Ō-Jō remix CD released in Japan. She also composed a song for the Wii game Walk It Out. In September 2009, Yamashita was invited as a special guest to Video Games Live at their concert event in Tokyo, where she appeared on stage after a performance of Castlevania produced by Tommy Tallarico. In 2010 and 2011, she continued to make appearances with Video Games Live performing "Castlevania Rock" with orchestras at venues including NJPAC in New Jersey, the Tilles Center in New York City and the Nokia Theatre in Los Angeles.

In 2012, she appeared alongside Video Game Orchestra.

She has also posted her music to her YouTube account, such as a piano arrangement of music from Mega Man X3.

== Works ==
Year	Title	Notes
1986	Castlevania	with Satoe Terashima
1986	King Kong 2: Ikari no Megaton Punch	with several others
1987	Hi no Tori Hououhen: Gaou no Bouken	with Iku Mizutani and Hidenori Maezawa
1987	Esper Dream	
1987	Arumana no Kiseki	
1987	Maze of Galious	with several others
1987	Nemesis 2	with Motoaki Furukawa and Masahiro Ikariko
1987	Uşas	
1988	King's Valley II	with several others
1988	Parodius	MSX version
1988	Snatcher	MSX version; sound effects
1991	Power Blade	
1991	Hana Taaka Daka!?	
1992	Power Blade 2	
1993	Ghost Sweeper Mikami: Joreishi ha Nice Body	
1993	Zen-Nippon Pro Wrestling	with Iku Mizutani and Hiroyuki Iwatsuki
1994	Pocky & Rocky 2	with Hiroyuki Iwatsuki
1994	Zen-Nippon Pro Wrestling: Fight da Pon!	with Iku Mizutani and Shinya Kurahashi
1994	Natsume Championship Wrestling	with Iku Mizutani and Hiroyuki Iwatsuki
1994	Mighty Morphin Power Rangers	Super NES version; with Iku Mizutani
1994	Mega Man: The Wily Wars	original music and arrangements of the included first three Mega Man games
1995	Mark Davis' The Fishing Master	with Iku Mizutani
1995	Zen-Nippon Pro Wrestling 2	with several others
1995	Heian Fuuunden	with Iku Mizutani
1995	Mega Man X3	
1997	Casper	Super Famicom version; with Iku Mizutani
1997	Medarot	
1998	Digital Figure Iina	with Iku Mizutani
1998	Dragon Dance	with Iku Mizutani
1998	Big Mountain 2000	
1999	Medarot 2	with Iku Mizutani
1999	Bass Masters Classic	Game Boy Color version
2000	Medarot 3	
2000	Keitai Denjuu Telefang	
2000	Sylvania Melodies: Mori no Nakama to Odori Mashi!	
2001	Croc 2	Game Boy Color version; with Iku Mizutani
2001	Medarot 4	
2001	Medarot 5	
2001	Monsters, Inc.	Game Boy Advance version; with Iku Mizutani and Tetsuari Watanabe
2002	Medarot G	
2003	Medabots	Game Boy Advance version
2003	Buffy the Vampire Slayer: Wrath of the Darkhul King	with Iku Mizutani and Tetsuari Watanabe
2003	Medabots Infinity	
2009	Armored Hunter Gunhound	
