= Kiki Kaikai =

1986 video game

Kiki KaiKai
- Japanese arcade flyer
- Developer: Taito (Note: Famicom Disk System version developed by Bits Laboratory.)
- Publisher: Taito
- Director: Mikio Hatano
- Artists: Toshiyuki Nishimura; Kazuya Mikata
- Composers: Hisayoshi Ogura; Famicom Disk System; Yoshiaki Tsuruoka
- Series: Pocky & Rocky
- Platforms: Arcade, MSX2, Famicom Disk System, PC Engine, mobile phone, Windows
- Release: October 1986: Arcade; JP: October 1986; NA: December 1986 MSX2; JP: February 10, 1987 Famicom Disk System; JP: August 28, 1987 PC Engine; JP: March 27, 1990 Mobile; WW: June 12, 2003 Windows; JP: May 14, 2004
- Genres: Shoot 'em up, action
- Mode: Single-player

Kiki Kaikai (Note: Japanese: 奇々怪界, Hepburn: Kiki Kaikai; lit. "Strange World") is a 1986 shoot 'em up video game developed and published by Taito for arcades. Set in Feudal Japan, the player assumes the role of a Shinto shrine maiden who must use her o-fuda scrolls and gohei wand to defeat renegade spirits and monsters from Japanese mythology. The game is noteworthy for using a traditional fantasy setting in a genre otherwise filled with science fiction motifs.

The game received a number of home ports, both as a stand-alone title and as part of compilations. Taito would license the rights of the game to Natsume, who developed a sequel for the Super NES in 1992, known as Pocky & Rocky outside Japan. The series, known as Kiki Kaikai in Japan and Pocky & Rocky outside Japan, has continued since then under Natsume Atari.

== Plot ==
The game follows the adventures of "Sayo-chan", a young Shinto shrine maiden living in Feudal Japan. One night, while Sayo-chan is fanning a ceremonial fire, she is visited by the Seven Lucky Gods, who warn her of a great, impending danger. Suddenly, a band of mischievous youkai appear and kidnap the gods, quickly retreating to a faraway mountain range. Sayo-chan, determined to help the gods, sets off on a journey across the countryside, where she confronts a number of strange creatures from Japanese mythology, including obake, and yurei.

== Gameplay ==
Arcade gameplay

Kiki Kaikai is an overhead multi-directional shooter game that requires the player to move in four directions through various levels while attacking harmful enemies as they approach from off screen. As Sayo-chan, the player can attack by either throwing her special o-fuda scrolls in eight separate directions, or by swinging her purification rod directly in front of her. These techniques can be upgraded by finding special paper slips left by defeated enemies that will either enhance their power or improve their range. Sayo can be damaged by coming in contact with an enemy, and can only be hit once before she is knocked out and must resume the level from a preset continuation point. At the end of each level, the player must face a powerful boss monster that takes several attacks to defeat and is more difficult than normal enemies.

Several hidden items can be found by attacking objects with Sayo's purification rod, and can be used to either enhance her attack or grant the player points. Once a certain number of points are gained, the player will gain another life and have an additional chance to complete a level. When all of the player's lives are exhausted, a "number match" screen appears with a random 3-digit number in 50-base increments (100, 150, 200, 250, and so on). If the last three digits of the player's total score match the number displayed, (s)he is granted a free game; if not, the game ends.

The Family Computer Disk System version of Kiki Kaikai introduced a few gameplay changes over the original arcade version, including new levels and enemies, as well as limiting the number of times the player may use Sayo-chan's ranged o-fuda attack, along with a second playable character: "Miki-chan", another shrine maiden who is designated as the player two character, but only playing alternately. Though several additional ports would be made over the years, each one would rely on the same basic game mechanics.

== Development ==
Kiki Kaikai was created in 1986 by Taito game designer Hisaya Yabusaki. Pulling inspiration from tales of Japanese mythology, as well as several top-down arcade shooters popular during the era, the game put a conventional spin on the usually technologically driven science-fiction "shoot 'em up" titles at the time. Utilizing action game elements, the player is free to move about the screen as he/she chooses, instead of being forced forward in normal scrolling shooter fashion. While similar to the earlier released game Commando in both style and presentation, Kiki Kaikai is described by Taito as a "lovely action game" offering an "exotic Asian atmosphere".

=== Ports ===
The Disk System version, Kiki Kaikai: Dotō-hen

Kiki Kaikai has been ported to numerous home consoles and personal computer systems since its original arcade release. The game's first home version was released for the MSX2 on February 10, 1987, with minor gameplay adjustments. Later on August 28, a version for the Famicom Disk System was released entitled Kiki Kaikai: Dotō-hen, which added two-player support (playing alternately) via a new playable character, "Miki-chan". The Famicom Disk System version's packaging featured idol singer Miki Ito, who recorded a single featuring the game's title music, "Sayo Carnival", which was the B-side to her single "Aishu Pucelle". A PC Engine version was released three years later on March 27, 1990, which was largely based on the previous Disk System installment. The game made the jump from consoles on June 12, 2003, when Taito developed a Java-based version of Kiki Kaikai for mobile phones called Kiki Kaikai: The Bizarre World. This was the first port of Kiki Kaikai released overseas. A port programmed by MediaKite appeared on May 14, 2004 for Windows, and a web-based game service was launched on Taito's Japanese website later that year courtesy of EZWeb.

Kiki Kaikai was also made available along with various other classic Taito titles in a number of compilations. It would appear in the Japanese-only Taito Memories Vol. 1 for the PlayStation 2 on July 28, 2005, and again in Taito Pocket Memories for the PlayStation Portable in 2006. The game was ported as part of Taito Legends 2 for the PlayStation 2, Windows, and Xbox released in North America in May 2007, and later in Taito Legends Power-Up for the PlayStation Portable. Hamster Corporation released the game as part of their Arcade Archives series for the PlayStation 4 in 2016 and Nintendo Switch in 2020.

== Music ==
Kiki Kaikai's soundtrack, composed by Hisayoshi Ogura, is reflective of traditional Japanese folk music, mostly utilizing woodwind and string instruments like the shamisen with an electronic beat. The music was originally presented in mono format, and was composed entirely of synth-based chiptunes, a standard audio development system for older video game hardware. An exclusive game soundtrack was never released commercially, but all the music from the game was featured on the 1987 album Taito Game Music (catalog number 28XA-110) published by Alfa Music as a single track medley. Each song was later presented as individualized tracks on the 2002 re-release of Taito Game Music (SCDC-00156), this time published by Sci-Tron Digital Content.

== Reception ==
Reception

Review score
Publication	Score
Famicom Hisshoubon	2/5, 3/5 (FC)

In Japan, Game Machine listed Kiki Kaikai as the second most successful table arcade unit of November 1986. It went on to be the tenth highest-grossing table arcade game of 1987 in Japan.

Kiki Kaikai has garnered harsh reviews long after its initial release. GameSpot considers the game one of Taito's sleepier titles, and of overall less quality than their other classic games like Bubble Bobble and Double Dragon (the latter was licensed from Technos for the U.S.). The game's graphics, though unique at the time they were produced, did not preserve well, with AllGame remarking that "once you get over your initial amusement at the game's smiling ghosts and comical skeletons, you'll find the graphics to be dull". The controls were seen as simplistic, yet responsive, though each of the game's levels were found to be too monotonous.

== Legacy ==
The Taito US/Japanese Family Computer / Nintendo Entertainment System and Europe-exclusive Master System versions of Rainbow Islands: The Story of Bubble Bobble 2 include an island based on Kiki Kaikai as a replacement for Magical Island. The Europe-exclusive Game Boy Color version of the game also includes this island as a secret island. Bubble Symphony also includes two sets of levels based on Kiki Kaikai.

Like The Ninja Warriors, Kiki Kaikai had been a one-off work until 1992, when Taito allowed Natsume Co., Ltd. to release Kiki Kaikai: Nazo no Kuro Mantle, which would be known as Pocky & Rocky for its international releases. Natsume would follow up with Pocky & Rocky 2 (released as Kiki Kaikai: Tsukiyo Soushi in Japan), and years later would help Altron to release Pocky & Rocky with Becky (released as Kiki Kaikai Advance in Japan). A new installment, Pocky & Rocky Reshrined (which will be released as KiKi KaiKai: Kuro Mantle no Nazo in Japan), is currently in development for the Nintendo Switch and PlayStation 4 by Tengo Project.

A modern continuation to Kiki Kaikai, Kiki Kaikai 2, was originally in development for the Wii by Starfish Entertainment and set for a 2006 release, but was canceled early in its development only to reemerge as the unlicensed spiritual successor with title Kiki Kai World, which later became Heavenly Guardian when published.

The protagonist of the game's design, as well as the ghost enemies, would later become heavy influences for the characters Reimu Hakurei and equivalent ghost enemies respectively in the Touhou Project games on the PC-98.
