= Pocky & Rocky (video game) =

1992 video game

- North American box art
- Developer: Natsume Co., Ltd.
- Publishers: JP: Natsume Co., Ltd.; NA/EU: Natsume Inc.
- Programmer: Kazuhiko Ishihara
- Artists: Shunichi Taniguchi; Tomoyuki Nishiyama; Yoshihino Hattori
- Composer: Hiroyuki Iwatsuki
- Series: Pocky & Rocky
- Platform: Super NES
- Release: JP: December 22, 1992; NA: June 1993; EU: August 1993
- Genre: Scrolling shooter
- Modes: Single-player, multiplayer

Pocky & Rocky (Note: Pocky & Rocky is known in Japan as KiKi KaiKai: Nazo no Kuro Manto (奇々怪界 謎の黒マント; "Mysterious Ghost World: The Mysterious Black Mantle").) is a 1992 scrolling shooter video game developed by Natsume Co., Ltd. for the Super Nintendo Entertainment System (Super NES). It is the sequel to Taito's 1986 arcade game KiKi KaiKai. Pocky & Rocky follows the adventures of a young Shinto shrine maiden, Pocky, and her new tanuki companion, Rocky, as they attempt to save a group of goblins from evil forces. Gameplay takes place from a top-down perspective and features both single-player and cooperative modes.

The game was generally well-received by critics. It was followed by Pocky & Rocky 2 (1994) and Pocky & Rocky with Becky (2001). A new entry, Pocky & Rocky Reshrined, released in 2022.

== Gameplay ==
Pocky and Rocky fighting against first stage boss of the game

Pocky & Rocky is a scrolling shooter video game that takes place from a top-down perspective. The screen can move either horizontally or vertically and the player-controlled characters can move in eight directions. The game features six levels and allows its players to continue indefinitely. In single-player mode, the player can choose to play as either Pocky or Rocky. In two-player cooperative mode, both characters are on the screen at the same time.

Pocky can use her ofudas to hit enemies from afar or swing her gohei to damage enemies close up. Likewise, Rocky can throw leaves across the screen or quickly turn his backside and swing his tail. Both characters can slide across the ground to cover the area quickly. If a player bumps into the other while sliding in a two-player game, it will cause the other player to spin out of control across the screen, damaging any enemies they come in contact with. A limited-use special bomb attack can be used to hit several or all the enemies present on the screen. There are some differences between both characters. Pocky moves and slides slightly faster than Rocky does. However, Rocky's slide attack goes a long distance. Pocky's bomb attack is more powerful than Rocky's, although Rocky's bombs cover a wider area. Pocky can also perform a spinning attack, whereas Rocky is able to transform into an invulnerable and immobile statue for a short time.

Various power-ups can be acquired that will increase the effectiveness of either Pocky or Rocky's attacks, such as making their projectiles larger or giving them the ability to throw multiple ones at once. Others include a shield that absorbs enemy attacks, and a power-up that replenishes hit points, giving Pocky and Rocky more endurance. A floating being called "Help man" is hidden in each level that will drop power-ups when found.

== Plot ==
Set in a Far East-themed world, Pocky & Rocky is about a young miko girl named Pocky (known in Japan as Sayo-chan (小夜ちゃん)) who is tending to a Shinto shrine when she is visited by Rocky the Tanuki, or raccoon dog (known in Japan as Manuke (魔奴化)). Rocky is a member of a group of creatures known as the Nopino Goblins. Some time ago, the Nopino Goblins (Yōkai in Japan) went insane, but were stopped and cured by Pocky. Rocky tells Pocky that the Nopino Goblins have gone insane yet again and that she must help them. Suddenly, Pocky and Rocky are ambushed by the Nopino Goblins, which appear to be under a spell. Together, Pocky and Rocky must unravel the mystery of who is controlling the Nopino Goblins. Throughout the game, they battle a number of creatures from Japanese mythology, including kappas.

== Release ==
Pocky & Rocky was licensed by Taito to Natsume Co., Ltd., who developed and published the game for release in Japan in 1992 and the rest of the world in 1993. It is the sequel to the 1986 arcade game KiKi KaiKai.

It was released for the Super Famicom in Japan on December 22, 1992. In Japan, Pocky & Rocky was broadcast on the Satellaview service on June 6, 1997.

== Reception ==
Reception

Review scores
Publication	Score
AllGame	4/5
Computer and Video Games	72/100
Famitsu	6/10, 6/10, 5/10, 6/10
Game Players	8/10
GamesMaster	74%
Hyper	88%
Official Nintendo Magazine	90/100
Super Play	82%
Total!	(UK) 76% (DE) 2-
VideoGames & Computer Entertainment	7/10
Control	82%
Electronic Games	94%
N-Force	80/100
Nintendo Magazine System	91/100
Super Action	87%
The Super Famicom	70/100
Super Gamer	89%
Super Pro	90/100

Award
Publication	Award
Electronic Gaming Monthly (1993)	Best Game Duo of the year

Pocky & Rocky received a 21.62/30 score in a 1993 readers' poll conducted by Super Famicom Magazine, ranking among Super Famicom titles at the number 93 spot. The game received generally favorable reviews from critics. In 1996, Super Play ranked it as number 91 on its list of the top 100 SNES games.

== Sequels ==
Pocky & Rocky spawned three official sequels and one spiritual successor. In Pocky & Rocky 2 (1994) for SNES, Pocky and Rocky must work together once again to stop a forced marriage between a princess and a tyrant. In the second sequel, Pocky & Rocky with Becky (2001) for Game Boy Advance, the duo are joined by their friend Becky to stop a hydra dragon. The latest entry, Pocky & Rocky Reshrined, was released for the PlayStation 4 and Nintendo Switch in 2022, and on Windows in 2023.

UFO Interactive Games released a spiritual successor to the series, Heavenly Guardian (2007), developed by Starfish for the PlayStation 2 and Wii.
