= USAS =

USAS or Usas may refer to:

- Uṣas or Ushas, a Hindu goddess
- Uşas, a platform game for the MSX 2
- USAS (Outer Limits), a space organization in a series of Outer Limits episodes
- USAS, the ship prefix for "United States Army Ship"
- USAS (application), a set of applications used by the airline, transportation, and hospitality industries
- United States Air Service, a precursor to the United States Air Force
- United States Antarctic Service, a former name of the United States Antarctic Program
- Usas Escarpment, in Antarctica
- United Students Against Sweatshops, a United States student organization for worker rights
- USAS-12, an automatic shotgun
