= Hiroyuki Iwatsuki =

Japanese video game music composer (born 1970)

Hiroyuki Iwatsuki (岩月 博之) (born 1970) is a Japanese video game music composer who has contributed to the soundtracks of Ninja Warriors, Pocky & Rocky, and Omega Five. He has been composing and arranging songs for the game company Natsume Atari beginning as early as the 1991 NES title Chaos World.

For his score to the Xbox Live Arcade shooter Omega Five, Iwatsuki employed his years of experience creating game soundtracks to fashion retro versions of his songs to simulate the feel of a 16-bit game. An album release was planned after game composer Manabu Namiki listened to the soundtrack prior to the release and suggested the sound design team Super Sweep participate in arrangements for the album.

== Selected games ==
- Chaos World (1991): Composer (in collaboration with Iku Mizutani)
- Spanky's Quest (Game Boy) (1991): Composer
- Choujin Sentai Jetman (NES) (1991): Composer
- Tail 'Gator (Game Boy) (1991): Sound effects
- Ninja Gaiden Shadow (Game Boy) (1991): Composer
- Shatterhand (NES) (1991): Sound effects
- Pocky & Rocky (1992): Composer
- Mitsume ga Tōru (1992): Composer
- Chase H.Q. II: Special Criminal Investigation (1992): Composer
- Ghost Sweeper Mikami: Joreishi ha Nice Body (1993): Sound effects
- Mighty Morphin Power Rangers (1994): Sound effects
- Mitsume ga Tōru (1992): Composer
- Zen-Nippon Pro Wrestling (1993): Composer (in collaboration with Iku Mizutani and Kinuyo Yamashita)
- Natsume Championship Wrestling (1994): Composer (in collaboration with Iku Mizutani and Kinuyo Yamashita)
- The Ninja Warriors Again (1994): Composer (in collaboration with N. Tate)
- Pocky & Rocky 2 (1994): Composer (in collaboration with Kinuyo Yamashita)
- Wild Guns (1994): Composer (in collaboration with Haruo Ohashi)
- Natsume Championship Wrestling (1994): Composer (in collaboration with Iku Mizutani and Kinuyo Yamashita)
- Mighty Morphin Power Rangers: The Fighting Edition (1995): Composer (in collaboration with Haruo Ohashi)
- Zen-Nippon Pro Wrestling 2 (1995): Composer (in collaboration with Iku Mizutani, Kinuyo Yamashita and Haruo Ohashi)
- Mighty Morphin Power Rangers: The Movie (1995): Composer (in collaboration with Haruo Ohashi)
- Mighty Morphin Power Rangers (1995): Sound effects
- Gekisō Sentai Carranger: Zenkai! Racer Senshi (1996): Composer (in collaboration with Haruo Ohashi)
- Gundam Wing Endless Duel (1996): Composer (in collaboration with Haruo Ohashi)
- Power Rangers Zeo: Battle Racers (1996): Composer
- Hokuto no Ken: Seikimatsu Kyūseishu Densetsu (2000): Composer
- Gear Fighter Dendoh (2001): Composer
- Hyakujuu Sentai GaoRanger (2001): Composer
- Ninpu Sentai Hurricanger (2001): Composer
- WWE Road to WrestleMania X8 (2002): Composer (in collaboration with Iku Mizutani and Tetsuari Watanabe)
- Mobile Suit Gundam SEED (2003): Composer (in collaboration with Noriko Fujimura, Iku Mizutani, and Tetsuari Watanabe)
- Battle Assault 3 Featuring Gundam SEED (2004): Composer
- Omega Five (2008): Composer
- Half-Minute Hero (2009): Composer (in collaboration with many others)
- Half-Minute Hero: The Second Coming (2011): Composer (in collaboration with many others)
- Wild Guns Reloaded (2016): Composer, Arranger
- Pocky & Rocky Reshrined (2022): Composer
- Eiyuden Chronicle: Rising (2022): Composer
