= Pocky & Rocky Reshrined =

2022 video game

- Developer: Natsume Atari
- Publisher: Natsume
- Director: Toshiyasu Miyabe
- Artist: Shunichi Taniguchi
- Composer: Hiroyuki Iwatsuki
- Series: Pocky & Rocky
- Engine: Unity
- Platforms: Nintendo Switch, PlayStation 4, Windows, Xbox Series X and Series S
- Release: Nintendo Switch, PlayStation 4: JP: April 21, 2022; EU: June 24, 2022; NA: June 24, 2022; Windows: February 24, 2023; Xbox Series X/S: December 7, 2023
- Genre: Multidirectional scrolling shooter
- Modes: Single-player, multiplayer

Pocky & Rocky Reshrined (Note: 奇々怪界 黒マントの謎, KiKi KaiKai Kuro Manto No Nazo; lit. 'Mysterious Ghost World: The Mysterious Black Mantle') is a 2022 scrolling shooter video game developed by Natsume Atari's Tengo Project. The game involves the player controlling one of a few characters in a top-down perspective where they continue through stages avoiding enemies and their bullets to battle the respective boss character. The game starts out as a retread of the story in Pocky & Rocky (1992) about the shrine maiden Pocky and her friend Rocky the raccoon, but changes dramatically a few stages in.

The game was announced in 2020 and was developed by Tengo Project, a team led by three developers who worked on the 1992 game. Pocky & Rocky Reshrined was released April 21, 2022 in Japan, and had exceeded sales of 100,000 by July 14, 2022. Based on nine reviews each for the PlayStation 4 and Nintendo Switch, Pocky & Rocky Reshrined garnered "generally favorable reviews" according to review aggregator site Metacritic.

== Gameplay ==
Cooperative mode gameplay featuring characters ambushed by kasa-obake

Pocky & Rocky Reshrined is a multidirectional scrolling shooter where players control a character from a top-down perspective that can both walk as well as direct their aim with the directional buttons. Each stage has a time limit, the player can progress through the stages at their pace. Each stage is cleared by defeating the large boss character that awaits at the end. Various stages in story mode have the player be different characters such as Pocky and Rocky, each with slightly different forms of gameplay. Other characters also feature unique abilities such as Ame-no-Uzume who attacks with magatama beads and has the ability to hover, making her not fall in water. Hotaru uses their naginata and odachi to attack rather than fire projectiles. In later stages, each character learns new attacks that vary greatly depending on the character, but generally have one called the "attack augmentation" that assists in attacking, and another called "the purification charge" that strengthens defense.

Various items can be found throughout stages within boxes. Upgrades to the main weapon can be found by collecting items that come in three colors: orange, blue, and green. Each orb has a different style of power-up. One of the upgrades adds more projectiles for a wider spread; the fire upgrade does more immediate single-target damage; the wind upgrade does more continuous damage when you land a shot, or even creates something of a homing shot, depending on the character wielding it. These upgraded attacks become even stronger as you collect the same type of power orbs, and when the power level reaches its maximum. If you pick up one of these items of a different type than the one you are currently using, your attack method will be overwritten by the newly acquired item. When a character receive damage, their power of these upgrades will decrease. Other items can be found such as an amulet which protects the player from enemy bullets, or guardian lions that will briefly grant invincibility.

The main ways to avoid enemies and their attacks is by either sliding or using a bomb. Each character can slide which allows you them move a set distance quickly. The bomb item can attack the surrounding area and eliminate enemy bullets from the screen. Bombs limited to number of times they can be used. They can also be found throughout stages to increase the player's stock. The player is also equipped with a melee attack which has a short reach and mediocre power, but has the power to deflect most enemy bullets.

The player's health in the game is indicated by a life gauge marked by hearts. When an enemy or one of the enemy bullets touch your character, their health gauge decreases. Clearing a stage increaes the maximum amount of stamina a character can have. If the health gauge reaches zero, they lose one of their lives they have on stock. When they run out of lives, the game ends. If the game ends midway through, you can continue from the middle of the stage instead of from the beginning, as long as you have progressed past a certain point. The game can be played in normal mode or hard mode. In hard mode, bullets fly towards the player when an enemy is defeated, and the attacks of boss characters are more difficult.

== Plot ==
Pocky the shrine maiden lives deep in the mountains, far from other humans. One day, her friend, Rocky the raccoon, comes to her asking for help because a mountain monster is running wild. After subduing it, the monsters return to their old selves and say they were attacked by Black Mantle. After defeating a monstrous octopus near a river, they are attacked by Black Mantle. Pocky takes a blow and her spirit awakens in the Land of Kami. With the help of mythological gods, she and Rocky fight a battle across time to unravel Black Mantle's mystery and defeat a powerful demon responsible for the chaos in the world.

== Development and release ==
Before Pocky & Rocky Reshrined there was Kiki Kaikai (1986), an arcade game released by Taito in 1986. The game was ported to various video game consoles and Natsume acquired the license for the name and made a sequel in 1992 for the Super Nintendo Entertainment System titled Pocky & Rocky.

Natsume Atari announced on September 10, 2020, that they were developing a new Pocky & Rocky game. Pocky & Rocky Reshrined was developed by Tengo Project, a team within Natsume Atari. The three members of Tengo Project who had worked on Pocky & Rocky include designer and graphic artist Shunichi Taniguchi, composer and programmer Hiroyuki Iwatsuki, and director and programmer Toshiyasu Miyabe. Miyabe said that while the team were involved in the development of new game were not the main staff of the original, they felt pressured to match the style of Pocky & Rocky. The team developed the game with the Unity game engine. They also used custom sprite-editing software and techniques first used during the Super Nintendo years to closely emulate a 16-bit style.

Destructoid's Zoey Handley said that while Tengo Project's previous games Wild Guns Reloaded and Ninja Saviors: Return of the Warriors were "enhanced remasters", Pocky & Rocky Reshrined was more of a sequel. Much of the game is pulled from Japanese folklore, such as Rocky being described as a raccoon but actually being a tanuki.

Pocky & Rocky Reshrined was showcased online at the Tokyo Game Show in September 2020. That year's event was cancelled due to the COVID-19 pandemic which led to the show being an online showcase. It was released in Japan on April 21, 2022, for the PlayStation 4 and the Nintendo Switch. It was released in North America and Europe on June 24, 2022. Natsume Atari has announced that cumulative sales of both console versions of Pocky & Rocky Reshrined have exceeded 100,000 copies on July 14, 2022. A second exhibit of the game was shown Tokyo Game Show held at the Makuhari Messe between September 15 and 18, 2022. It was presented as part of an indie game corner. Pocky & Rocky Reshrined was later released to Windows on February 24 and the Xbox Series X and Series S on December 7, 2023.

== Reception ==
Reception

Aggregate score
Aggregator	Score
Metacritic	81/100 (NS); 76/100 (PS4)

Review scores
Publication	Score
Anime News Network	A-
Destructoid	7.5/10
EGM	5/5
Famitsu	8/10, 8/10, 8/10, 6/10
Nintendo Life	9/10
Nintendo World Report	7/10
Push Square	7/10
Retro Gamer	90%
Siliconera	7/10

Based on nine reviews each for the PlayStation 4 and Nintendo Switch, Pocky & Rocky Reshrined garnered "generally favorable reviews" according to review aggregator site Metacritic.

Todd Ciolek of the Anime News Network and Molley Patterson of EGM complimented the graphics. Ciolek said that Tengo's projects skill with 2D pixel art was on "nonstop display" while Patterson called it "easily the team's best visual work" Nintendo World Report's Jordan Rudek said the game featured "poorly-localized cutscenes", this was echoed by Jenni Lada of Siliconera who found these scenes dialogues a bit stilted due to storytelling decisions and the localization. Ruden added that as there was no way speed up dialogue without skipping it, the "lengthy cutscenes" became a chore.

Handley said the difficulty was slightly uneven with bosses being upstaged by some of the regular level enemies. While Tom Massey of Nintendo Life said it was easier than the 1992 Pocky & Rocky, new comers would find it challenging. A reviewer in Famitsu said that as the game has plenty of mid-way points for restarting, the high difficulty was not negligible. Ciolek said that since Reshrined was not relatively long compared to " today's mandatory 30-hour blockbusters" its combination of challenge and its refusal to let players go through a level or past a boss fight made it a "game that makes you remember it."

Ciolek wished there had been strafing ability in the game as it said it was a fairly standard feature in overhead shooters, while Push Square's Sammy Barker found the game's control scheme "archaic" and that it felt restrictive to control the game with a d-pad. Massey also found that it "plays a marginally slower game" than Pocky & Rocky, while a Famitsu reviewer said the speed was too slow when changing the characters directions and the bursts of invulnerability when getting hit.

A number of reviewers critiqued that the two-player mode was locked on initially playthroughs, with Lada saying that it was an especially baffling decision as a two-player mode was available from the start of Pocky & Rocky.
