= Knightmare (1986 video game) =

1986 video game

- Developer: Konami
- Publisher: Konami
- Composers: Miki Higashino; Yoshinori Sasaki
- Series: Knightmare
- Platforms: MSX, Mobile phone
- Release: MSX: JP: March 29, 1986; EU: 1986; Mobile phone: JP: January 8, 2003
- Genre: Vertically scrolling shooter
- Mode: Single-player

Knightmare (Note: Known as Majou Densetsu (Japanese: 魔城伝説, Hepburn: Majō Densetsu; lit. "Demon Castle Legend" or "Legend of the Devil Castle") in Japanese.) is a 1986 vertically scrolling shooter video game developed and published by Konami for the MSX home computer. It was included in compilations for the MSX, PlayStation and Sega Saturn, followed by a port for mobile phones, and digital re-releases for the Virtual Console and Microsoft Windows via Project EGG. It is the first entry in the Knightmare trilogy. The game stars Popolon, a warrior who embarks on a quest to rescue Princess Aphrodite from the evil priest Hudnos. The player must fight waves of enemies while avoiding collision with their projectiles and obstacles along the way, and facing against bosses.

Knightmare was created by the MSX division at Konami under management of Shigeru Fukutake. The character of Popolon was conceived by a staffer who later became the project's lead designer and writer, as the process of making original titles for the platform revolved around the person who came up with the characters. Development proceeded with a team of four or five members, lasting somewhere between four and six months. The music was scored by Miki Higashino, best known for her work in the Gradius and Suikoden series, and Yoshinori Sasaki.

Knightmare garnered generally positive reception from critics and retrospective commentators. It was followed by The Maze of Galious, while Popolon and Aphrodite would later make appearances outside of the trilogy in other Konami titles. In the years since, fans have experimented with remaking and porting the title unofficially to other platforms.

== Gameplay ==
Gameplay screenshot of the MSX version

Knightmare is a vertical-scrolling shoot 'em up game starring Popolon, a warrior who embarks on a quest to rescue the princess Aphrodite from the evil priest Hudnos. The player controls Popolon through eight increasingly difficult stages across a Greek-esque fantasy setting, populated with an assortment of enemies and obstacles, over a constantly scrolling background that never stops moving until a boss is reached, which must be fought in order to progress further. The player must also avoid or take out enemy formations to gain bonus points, and reveal hidden bridges to cross rivers by shooting at it.

Popolon is equipped with a bow and arrows as the main weapon, which can be upgraded or changed by collecting a flashing weapon crystal. Picking up a new weapon grants its initial state and can be upgraded by picking the same weapon twice in a row. Popolon can also obtain temporary power-ups via power crystals branded with a "P" icon that initially appears colored black. These can be cycled through other weapons and power-ups by firing at them, ranging from boomerangs, three-way shots, swords, speed increasers, temporary invincibility and a shield to withstand enemy projectiles. If grabbed in their initial state, these crystals grant extra bonus points instead.

Scattered on the playfield are question mark blocks containing chess-themed magic jewels that can aid or hinder the player by shooting a block to release the jewel. While many of the blocks are visible onscreen, others are hidden and must be unveiled by shooting at the block until the jewel is released. The player can also uncover secret exits within certain stages and warp into the next stage. Getting hit by an enemy or blocked by an obstacle and scrolled offscreen will result in losing a live stock, as well as a penalty of decreasing Popolon's overall firepower to his original state. The player can obtain more lives by earning 100.000 points each time or collecting a yellow magic jewel, but the game is over once all lives are lost.

== Development and release ==
Knightmare, known as Majou Densetsu in Japanese, was developed by the MSX division at Konami under management of Shigeru Fukutake, who revealed about its creation process in a 1988 interview with Japanese publication Micom BASIC Magazine. Fukutate explained that the staffer who came up with the character of Popolon was in charge of design and facilitating development of the project, as the process of making original titles for the MSX revolved around the person who came up with the characters being assigned to do both planning and the story. Fukutate further explained that the planner would then lead a team of four or five members to proceed with development, which would last between four and six months. Fukutate also claimed they made it difficult from the beginning because shoot 'em ups on the MSX were meant to be played at home. Micom BASIC writer Akira Yamashita speculated that the game's idea was possibly an arrangement of the Konami arcade game Finalizer (1985). The soundtrack was composed by Miki Higashino (best known for her work in the Gradius and Suikoden series) and Yoshinori Sasaki. Higashino worked as part-time composer and wrote the game's music, but she did not use the MSX hardware. Masaaki Kukino (of Haunted Castle, Asterix, and Silent Scope) revealed that the game's title is a portmanteau of knight and nightmare, giving it a double meaning.

Knightmare was first published for the MSX in Japan on March 29, 1986, and later in Europe of that year by Konami. In Argentina, the game was distributed by Microbyte. Konami also released a slightly altered version that could be downloaded from the "LINKS" network (a Japanese equivalent for internet in the 1980s), where the player could submit high scores to an online server. Unlicensed versions for the SG-1000 and arcades were also distributed under the names Mó Yù Chuánqí (魔域伝奇) and Pesadelo ("Nightmare" in Portuguese) by the Taiwanese company Jumbo and Brazilian manufacturer Fort II respectively. Its main theme was featured alongside music tracks from Penguin Adventure and King Kong 2: Yomigaeru Densetsu in a compilation album titled The Konamic Game Freaks, distributed in Japan by Alfa Records in 1987. In 1988, it was included as part of the Konami Game Collection Vol. 1 compilation for MSX, featuring support with the Konami SCC cartridge for improved audio.

Knightmare is found in the Konami Antiques MSX Collection (1997-1998) compilations for PlayStation and Sega Saturn. On January 8, 2003, Konami ported the game for i-mode enabled mobile phones through its Konami Net DX online service. In 2006, the full soundtrack was included as part of a compilation album titled Legend Of Game Music Consumer Box, distributed in Japan by Scitron. The game was re-released two times on the Japanese Virtual Console; first for the Wii on December 22, 2009, and later for the Wii U on March 19, 2014. It was also re-released in digital form for Microsoft Windows through D4 Enterprise's Project EGG service on July 22.

== Reception ==
Reception

Review scores
| Publication | Score |
|---|---|
| Input MSX | 43/50 |
| MSX Computing | 3/3 |
| MSX Magazine | 5/5, 4/5, 4/5 |

Award
| Publication | Award |
|---|---|
| Tilt (1986) | Best Action Software (MSX) |

Knightmare received generally positive reception from critics. The French MSX Magazine described it as a "must have" for shoot 'em up fans. MSX Computing saw its visuals as very innovative and found the audio to be acceptable, but felt that the game was similar to Sky Jaguar. MSX Computer Magazine recommended it for action fans and regarded it as one of Konami's better titles on MSX, highlighting the graphics and sound. They felt that the game's variety kept it interesting, but noted its extreme difficulty. Tilt concurred regarding its challenging difficulty, while feeling that the continuous automatic scroll was slow and caused frustration. Regardless, they labelled it as "one of the finest" action games on the platform, commending the audiovisual presentation. They also named it as the "Best Action Software" of 1986.

An editor for MSX Gids lauded the game's visuals, audio and overall quality, noting its addictive nature but the difficulty as well. Micro V.O's Yves Huitric commended its audiovisual aspect, but noted that the character moved faster than the scrolling scenery. Aktueller Software Markt's Wolfgang Rui noted the game's challenging difficulty but expressed admiration towards the music, stating that it was "the best thing I've heard so far on MSX". Spanish publication Input MSX praised the graphics for their originality and variety, as well as the audio. A writer for MSX News regarded Knightmare as "an authentic masterpiece". The five reviewers of MSX Extra commented that it was a fun fast-paced but difficult game. They noted the varied visuals, background music, and sound effects in a positive light.

=== Retrospective coverage ===
Retrospective commentaries for Knightmare have been favorable. Retro Gamer's Stuart Hunt highlighted Miki Higashino's music for enhancing the gameplay, but found the game difficult due to the lack of save options. MeriStation's David Pérez García and Francisco Alberto Serrano praised its graphical department, lack of slowdown, soundtrack and controls, deeming it as a "must-play" for shoot 'em up fans. USgamer's Jeremy Parish compared and found the game better than King's Knight (1986), citing its visual style, controls, and music. Parish also regarded it as a technical showcase for the MSX. Vandal's Emmanuel Castro called it "an outstanding game for its time", noting its difficulty and catchy main theme.

In 2014, HobbyConsolas identified Knightmare as one of the twenty best games for the MSX. IGN Spain's Jaume Esteve described it as an unusual vertical-scrolling shooter due to the absence of ships and compared its power-up system with that of TwinBee, writing that "despite the technical limitations of the computer that were mainly reflected in that limping scroll, Knightmare deserved much more impact than it finally had, although it is certainly one of the games that are essential when it comes to touching the catalog of the MSX." Kurt Kalata of Hardcore Gaming 101 commended the music and boss fights, opining that "It's a fun game, let down by some technical limitations."

== Legacy ==
Knightmare spawned two follow-ups released on the MSX and Family Computer, both of which fall under different genres: The Maze of Galious and Shalom: Knightmare III (1987). In addition to the main games, a stand-alone sequel titled Majou Densetsu II: Poporon Gekitou Hen (Note: 魔城伝説II 〜ポポロン激闘編〜 (Majō Densetsu II ~Poporon Gekitō Hen~)) was scheduled to be published in 1987 by Konami for the PC-8801 and X1 home computers. The game was intended to be a vertical-scrolling shooter similar to the original but with role-playing elements added. Despite being advertised and previewed in Japanese magazines, it was never released for unknown reasons. The characters of Popolon and Aphrodite would later make appearances outside of the trilogy in other Konami titles such as Parodius (1988) and Hai no Majutsushi (1989). Former Compile staffer Takayuki Hirono cited Knightmare as an influence on Zanac (1986), particularly its power-up system. In 2021, Konami announced a contest encouraging indie developers to make games based on some of its classic series, including Knightmare.

In the years since, fans have experimented with remaking and porting Knightmare unofficially to other platforms. In 1992, an MS-DOS version was created by the group Friends Software. In 2005, a mod dubbed Knightmare Gold was released by Portuguese fan group Amusement Factory, which allowed support with the MSX2 hardware for smooth scrolling, an upgraded color palette, among other changes. In 2012, a ZX Spectrum port developed by Climacus and McNeil was released online as a free download. In 2013, a demo for a PC remake was released online by Spanish programmer Alberto De Hoyo (of Demon VideoGames), with the full version releasing in 2015, followed by a "Gold Edition" containing new features. In 2015, a ColecoVision port was developed by Opcode Games and published by Team Pixelboy, featuring an "Easy" mode but requires the Super Game Module expansion to run on the hardware, while the ROM image was released online for free in 2018. In 2022, an Amiga port co-developed by "h0ffman" and Toni Galvez was made available online for free, featuring several enhancements and additions.
