= Shatterhand =

1991 video game

- North American cover art
- Developer: Natsume
- Publishers: JP: Angel; NA/EU: Jaleco
- Programmer: Kazuhiko Ishihara
- Artists: Shunichi Taniguchi; Norihide Mizoguchi; Sachiko Matsuura
- Composers: Iku Mizutani; Hiroyuki Iwatsuki
- Platforms: Nintendo Entertainment System, PlayChoice-10
- Release: JP: October 26, 1991; NA: December 1991; EU: November 19, 1992
- Genres: Action/Platformer, beat 'em up
- Mode: Single-player

Shatterhand is a side-scrolling action game for the Nintendo Entertainment System developed by Natsume and published by Jaleco in North America in 1991 and in Europe in 1992. Shatterhand was originally released by Angel (Bandai) in Japan in 1991 as a licensed game for the Family Computer based on the live-action superhero series Super Rescue Solbrain (特救指令ソルブレイン, Tokkyū Shirei Soruburein).

== Plot ==
Set in the year 2030, a group of military renegades known as Metal Command, led by General Gus Grover, are seeking to conquer the world by building an army of cyborg soldiers. Steve Hermann, a young police officer from the Bronx, ends up losing both of his arms during a skirmish with members of Metal Command. After the incident, Hermann is offered two specially developed cybernetic arms developed by the Law and Order Regulatory Division (L.O.R.D.) to replace the ones he lost. Hermann accepts the offer and becomes an agent codenamed "Shatterhand", who is now tasked with the mission to defeat Metal Command.

== Gameplay ==
Shatterhand is a side-scrolling action game that follows many of the established conventions in the genre. The main character's primary attacks are his very own fists, which he can also use to intercept enemy bullets. There are two type of power-ups that can be retrieved by destroying the item containers scattered throughout each stage: coins and letter icons.

The coins are used as currency that allows the player to obtain additional power-ups by standing over a certain platforms and crouching over it. These platforms will indicate which power-up the player will receive, along with the cost of the item. There are three types of power-up platforms: the first will restore the player's health and costs 300 coins, the second will increase the player's attack power (changing the color of the player's vest from green to brown) and costs 100 coins, and the third gives out an extra life and costs 2000 coins.

The letter icons are shaped in the Greek letters α and β. When a robotic part appears, the player can change the letter by punching it, but punching it too much will turn it into a large gold coin. After collecting three parts, a "robotic satellite" will appear floating alongside the player. The robotic satellite will attack alongside the player and can also be used to hover into the air by crouching and holding the A button. There are eight possible robotic satellites, depending on the combination of the letters collected, each with a different attack. For example, the ααβ robot fires laser beams, while αβα attacks with a sword. The robot can take damage from enemies and if it sustains too much, it will eventually be destroyed. If the player already has a robotic companion and picks up a new combination of letters, the new robot will replace the previous one, but if the player picks up the same combination twice in a row while still maintaining the robot, the player character will combine with the robot and will have more powerful attacks for a limited period before reverting to his standard form.

There are a total of seven stages dubbed "Areas". Area A, a factory stage, serves as the game's introductory stage, while the game's five subsequent stages, Area B to Area F, can be played in any order. The final stage, Area G, becomes accessible after the six stages are completed. The player starts off the game with two extra lives and can obtain more throughout the game. If the player loses all their lives, the game will be over, but the player is provided with unlimited chances to continue.

== Regional differences ==
The Famicom version, Tokkyū Shirei Solbrain, was published by a company called Angel, a now-defunct subsidiary of Bandai which specialized in the publication of licensed titles. The Famicom version follows the same storyline as the Solbrain TV series and features a different opening sequence from the one in Shatterhand. The graphics for most of the characters and items were changed as well. The most notable change is Area C, a carnival level in Solbrain, which was changed to an entirely different submarine level in Shatterhand.

== Reception ==
Reception

Review scores
Publication	Score
AllGame	3/5
Electronic Gaming Monthly	32/40
Famitsu	21/40
Game Players	6/10
HobbyConsolas	86/100
Nintendo Power	3.75/5
Superjuegos	85/100
Video Games (DE)	70%
Nintendo Acción	Very Good
VideoGames	7/10

Shatterhand garnered generally favorable reception from critics.
