= Esper Dream =

1987 video game

- Japanese FDS cover art
- Developer: Konami
- Publisher: Konami
- Composer: Kinuyo Yamashita
- Platforms: Family Computer Disk System, mobile phones
- Release: FDS: JP: February 20, 1987; Mobile phone: JP: February 1, 2007
- Genre: Action role-playing
- Mode: Single-player

Esper Dream (エスパードリーム, Esupā Dorīmu) is an action role-playing video game developed and published by Konami for the Family Computer Disk System. It was released in Japan on February 20, 1987. During this time, RPGs had a particular look and feel, primarily utilizing sword and magic motifs. Esper Dream takes place instead in a fairy tale world featuring a young boy with ESP talents who wields a gun.

A sequel, Esper Dream 2: Aratanaru Tatakai (エスパードリーム2 新(あら)たなる戦(たたか)い, lit. "Esper Dream 2: New Battle), was released for the Family Computer on June 26, 1992.

== Gameplay ==

Roaming and static enemy positions are made visible in the world as a set of paw prints. Fights take place in an enclosed area where the player must shoot the enemies until they are eliminated. Traditional RPG elements include the collection of experience points and money by defeating monsters, increasing hit points and esper points (magic) through level raises, and purchasing better equipment from towns located deeper in the game.

== Release ==
Esper Dream was released for the Family Computer Disk System in Japan on February 20, 1987.

Konami released the game as an i-application for cellular phone use as part of the Konami masterpiece series on February 1, 2007. In the same year, it was made available for download in Japan as part of the Wii Virtual Console on October 2.

An English fan translation was released for the game.

== Bibliography ==
- Kalata, Kurt (2017). Hardcore Gaming 101 Presents: Contra and Other Konami Classics. ISBN 978-1546928034.
