= Chaos World =

1991 video game

- Cover art
- Developer(s): Natsume
- Publisher(s): Natsume
- Designer(s): Yukio Morimoto; Kenichi Yamada
- Composer(s): Hiroyuki Iwatsuki; Iku Mizutani
- Platform(s): Family Computer
- Release: JP: October 25, 1991
- Genre(s): Role-playing
- Mode(s): Single-player

Chaos World (カオスワールド) is a role-playing video game developed and published by Natsume for the Family Computer in Japan in 1991.

== Gameplay ==
The game has a basic good vs. evil plot. This game is also one of the few games for the Family Computer that contains a day/night cycle. Players are allowed to assign the initial available character's gender and job class, which will affect the equipment and spells they can learn and acquire. Throughout the game other characters can be acquired and added to the party. There are guilds in the various towns where the player can assign characters in the party to perform 'jobs'. When a character is performing a 'job', they are not available for use in the player's party until the job has been completed. After the job is finished, the character will return to the player's party and will receive extra money and/or equipment.

A formation and tactic can be picked at the onset of the battle, but from there the battle is handled automatically, and items/spells/attacks are used when needed as determined by the computer.

== Plot ==
The king's daughter is sick while the kingdom is occupied by monsters. The king needs the player, who happens to be the offspring of the great warrior Mars, to investigate the cause of these incidents. The dark forces seek to conquer the world and the player must prevent it.
