= Uşas =

1987 video game

- Developer: Konami
- Publisher: Konami
- Composer: Kinuyo Yamashita
- Platform: MSX2
- Release: JP: November 1 1987; EU: 1987
- Genres: Action, platform
- Mode: Single-player

Treasure of Uşas (Note: Japanese: ウシャス, Hepburn: Ushasu) is 1987 a side-view platform game released by Konami for the MSX2 computer platform. The story follows archeology assistants on the hunt for a legendary gemstone for a statue of Ushas. The game received positive reviews by critics, who praised the level design and graphics.

== Gameplay and premise ==
Gameplay screenshot

Long before the events of the game, the Indra threw away the Goddess of Dawn's jewel, which fell to earth and broke into four pieces. In the present day, Wit and Cles are lab assistants for Assistant Professor Atre of oriental archeology. Recently, a statue of the Goddess Ushas has been discovered with a recession in its forehead where a gemstone seems to be placed. To save their laboratory from its financial problems, the two go and hunt for the missing gemstone to complete the statue.

The game is a two dimensional platform game. Due to hardware limitations of the MSX, the screen does not scroll, and instead is a static screen that switches to a new screen as the player progresses.

The player can pick between two different characters, Wit and Cles who have different starting stats. VIT stands for Vitality, and represents how much damage the player can take, SPD represents the characters walking speed, and JMP stands for their jumping ability. Both players likewise have different means of attacking. Wit uses firearms and starts slower and with less of a jump, while Cles can jump higher and walk faster but attacks with kicks. Coins are found throughout the stages, which can then be used to upgrade the power of your character or replenish health. Players can pick up different items that change emotions ("Joy," "Anger," "Sorrow," and "Happiness") that affect the kind of attack Wit and Cles can use.

Each of the game's five stages is divided into four sub-stages ('ruins') and a boss area ('shrine'). All four ruins need to be completed and their respective sub-bosses defeated before the shrine can be entered and the level's boss beat. Each sub-stage or shrine can be entered by only one of the characters at a time. If one of them perishes while attempting to clear a ruin, the other will have to come to his rescue.

Both characters have unique abilities. By touching one of four special 'emotion' icons found in various places within the game, the character will change to the corresponding mood: happy, angry, sad or neutral. Each mood bestows special powers (or lack thereof) and attacks, different for both Wit and Cles. This requires a careful management of what ruin to play with what character in what emotion. Moreover, a happy character has an additional 'secret' power: Cles can walk over gaps and Wit can jump mid-air.

The game has a graphic style that heavily borrows from Hinduism, Buddhism and South-East Asian art and architecture in general. In accordance with this, the game's passwords refer to actual ruins or ancient cities in southern and south-eastern Asia, for example 'Mohenjo Daro' and 'Harappa Ruins'.

The places where the ruins are, are also cities/places which really exist. These places are Pegu (or Bago, in Burma/Myanmar), Dunhuang (China), Hunza (Pakistan), Alchi (India) and Agra (India). Agra is known for the legendary Taj Mahal.

In tradition with other Konami cartridge releases of the same era, there are also some possible cartridge combinations. If Usas is placed in slot one, and F1 Spirit, Metal Gear, The Maze of Galious, or Nemesis, are placed in slot two, a special effect will take place such as additional coins.

== Ending ==
In a then-unusual twist at that time, the game ends on a downbeat note, where, upon putting the combined four pieces of the stone onto the forehead statue of Ushas, it is implied that Wit & Cles died in a nuclear explosion. The player is merely told in the intro that if the player finds all four gemstones, "Something good is sure to happen!". The epilogue text notes that Atre later discovered that the statue was actually a switch for a nuclear bomb developed many centuries ago. Concerned that it would misused, the stone was split into four pieces, and sealed away in four different locations, so that nobody would look for them. The epilogue then proceeds to mock the heroes as "Fools", while seemingly-happy music plays. This part of the ending was edited out from the European version.

== Development ==
For music, the game does not use the SCC (sound source chip) which was a Konami sound chip for the MSX and used in their port of Gradius 2.

== Releases ==
It was initially released on the MSX2 home computer on November 1, 1987. On June 23, 2015, the game was released for the Japanese retro video game distribution service Project EGG platform. The game was re-released for the WiiU Virtual Console in 2016 in Japan.

== Reception ==
Reception

Review scores
Publication	Score
The Games Machine	88%
ASM	10 /12
MSX Club Magazine	A

The game received largely positive reviews upon release, as well as in retrospective reviews. Upon release in Europe, reviewers praised the game. The Games Machine called it "Attention to detail is omnipresent and a fantastic, impelling urge to get to the final battle is instilled by the steady progress one makes with practice - and the enjoyment to be gleaned by making it." ASM likewise, praised the game, praising the graphics, and quality of the game's design. Likewise, Benjamin Llamas and Javier Veret of MSX Extra magazine praised the game's visuals and graphics, saying it is elevated to something on par with arcade games of the time. Wim Dewijngaert of MSX Club Magazine also praised the game, only lamenting the lack of an SCC chip.

Retrospective reception of the game was also positive. Loading magazine likewise also praised the graphics, and sound design, while also calling it the best platformer on the MSX system. Weekly ASCII in 2014 praised the game and said that the lack of screen scrolling was not an issue, given the skill of the developers to work around it.
