= Power Blade =

1990 video game

- North American box art
- Publisher: Taito
- Composer: Kinuyo Yamashita
- Platforms: Nintendo Entertainment System, PlayChoice-10
- Release: JP: April 20, 1990; NA: March 1991; EU: January 23, 1992
- Genre: Action/Platform
- Mode: Single-player

Power Blade, known in Japan as Power Blazer (パワー・ブレイザー, Pawā Burezā), is an action platform video game published by Taito for the Nintendo Entertainment System. It was released in Japan on April 20, 1990, North America in March 1991, and in Europe on January 23, 1992. The game spawned a sequel, Power Blade 2, released in 1992.

Power Blade takes place in the colony of New Earth in the year 2191 and follows NOVA, the Chief Security Officer of a supercomputer called the Master Computer. He must restore the Master Computer — which has been taken offline by aliens — by retrieving data tapes located in six sectors. The game features gameplay similar to the Mega Man series, in which players can select any of the six levels to play. Armed with a boomerang, players must complete all six levels, overcoming obstacles and defeating any enemies in the way.

The game's name comes from an item found in several levels; The Power Suit is an item that looks like a helmet. When collected Nova automatically equips the metal suit. This allows the player to shoot energy blasts known as "Power Blades" in any of the 8 directions and through most surfaces.

== Gameplay ==
Area 1 of Power Blade.

The player controls NOVA in a two-dimensional platforming environment. The object is to restore the Master Computer by going into each of six sectors of the Master Computer, accessing their databases, and recovering their data tapes. The player is armed with a boomerang in which the player can fire in all eight directions, destroying enemies. The ability to attack in all eight directions is indeed a rarity in 2-dimensional NES/Famicom platform games. Throughout each sector, players can upgrade the power, range, and number of boomerangs by collecting various power-ups. The player has a life meter which decreases every time the player is hit by an enemy; players lose a life if their life meter runs out, if they fall into a pit, or if time runs out. The game ends when the player has lost all lives, but the game has a continue feature in which players can restart their game at the beginning of the level in which their game ended. Power Blade also has a password feature which allows players to restart the game at a specific checkpoint at any time.

In Power Blade, players can go through the six sectors in any order via a stage select screen. The objective in each sector is to find the agent who can give players access into that sector's database and then enter the database's security room, where players must defeat a security guard (boss) in order to gain access to the database itself and retrieve the tape. Once all six tapes have been gathered, the player gains access to the Master Computer's control center, where the player must destroy the alien overlord and restore the Master Computer back to its original state. One aspect of Power Blade that sets it apart from Power Blazer and Power Blade 2 is that if the player falls off the screen they will die. In the other two games the player simply falls back to the previous area.

== Plot ==
After years of fighting that took millions of casualties, Earth is recovering from revolts in the 22nd century. In 2191, New Earth has a Master Computer that holds a secret database of the colony-planet's functioning. In wrong hands, the database could prove fatal to the whole planet. One day, aliens attack the Master Computer, making the Master control program malfunction. Nova, a lord of the ancient Power Blade is summoned to take care of the situation. The Power Blade is a glowing energy boomerang that Nova uses to defend himself.

In order to access the Master Computer's Control Center, Nova first has to obtain tape units from the six sectors surrounding the Master Computer. Each sector is heavily guarded by aliens, and Nova has to locate and contact an agent first to receive an ID card used to access the security room located at the same sector. After defeating the security room guards, Nova can obtain the sector's tape unit and use it to disarm the sector. After the six sectors have been disarmed, Nova must fight his way through the Control Center, destroy the Master Computer and restore order to the society.

== Localization ==
Power Blade is a reworked and localized version of the Japanese Family Computer game Power Blazer, which was released also by Taito on April 20, 1990. The original title for North America was Power Mission, after reworking the game they went with the name Power Blade. The reworking included a complete overhaul of the levels, a change of the look of the main character from a cartoon–like robot to an Arnold Schwarzenegger look–alike, and a significant improvement in gameplay controls. Other changes included the addition of agents who needed to be tracked down in each stage, power-ups that allowed you to throw multiple boomerangs, the ability to throw your boomerang in any direction, and a power suit that can be equipped by the player. Unlike Power Blade, the hero of Power Blazer goes by the name of Steve Treiber.

The title screen of the game features a picture of NOVA that closely resembles promotional images of Schwarzenegger in the 1984 film The Terminator. The box art, created by graphic artist Mike Winterbauer, also features a similar portrayal of NOVA. According to Winterbauer, "a certain movie star's lawyers" sent him a very unpleasant letter regarding the painting used for the cover. Winterbauer was able to prove that he had used a photograph of himself for reference and received no further unpleasant letters.

Power Blade first received coverage in the Western markets when it was first displayed at the Summer 1990 Consumer Electronics Show in Chicago. There, the game was called Power Mission and featured different character sprites from the finished version; Nintendo Power magazine called the game "mega action in the tradition of Mega Man II."

== Reception ==
Reception

Review scores
| Publication | Score |
|---|---|
| Aktueller Software Markt | 7/12 |
| Famitsu | 23/40 |
| HobbyConsolas | 74/100 |
| Joystick | 89% |
| Official Nintendo Magazine | 88% |
| Player One | 85% |
| Total! | 49% |
| Video Games (DE) | 79% |
| Mean Machines | 88% |
| Play Time | 50% |
| Super Gamer | 77% |

Power Blade garnered generally favorable reception from critics. Readers of Family Computer Magazine voted to give the game a 17.13 out of 30 score in a 1991 public poll. In 2009, IGN placed the title on their "Top 100 NES Games" list at #82.
