= Buffy the Vampire Slayer: Wrath of the Darkhul King =

2003 video game

- Developer: Natsume
- Publisher: THQ
- Director: Sosuke Yamazaki
- Producer: Iku Mizutani
- Platform: Game Boy Advance
- Release: NA: June 24, 2003; EU: June 27, 2003
- Genre: Action platformer
- Mode: Single player

Buffy the Vampire Slayer: Wrath of the Darkhul King is a 2003 video game developed by the Japanese company Natsume and published by THQ for the Game Boy Advance. It is an action platformer and the third of six video games based on the supernatural television series Buffy the Vampire Slayer. Set in the show's fourth season, Wrath of the Darkhul King centers on Buffy Summers and her allies as they attempt to prevent a demonic warlord from initiating an apocalyptic event. The player controls Buffy through sixteen levels that focus on solving puzzles and defeating enemies by using customizable weapons. THQ produced Wrath of the Darkhul King in a publishing agreement with Fox Interactive.

Natsume developed Wrath of the Darkhul King as an action game; dialogue was limited in order to focus on gameplay, and puzzles were added for variety. The game received generally negative reviews from critics, who disliked the controls, combat system, and level design. The graphics and audio received a more mixed response. Retrospective reviews of Wrath of the Darkhul King have remained negative. For two weeks, the game was in the top ten most-ordered games on Amazon.

== Gameplay ==
A gameplay screenshot of Buffy climbing across metal bars (top) and a cutscene still of Buffy (bottom)

Wrath of the Darkhul King is an action platformer video game; (Note: Video game critics had varying opinions of the genre for Wrath of the Darkhul King. It was described as both a platformer and an action game by AllGame's Scott Alan Marriott and John Scalzo of UGO Networks. The Guardian's Greg Howson and GameSpot's Justin Calvert and Frank Provo focused on the game's use of action, while GameSpy's Zach Meston and a BBC reviewer identified platforming as the primary gameplay. Provo and Scalzo referred to Wrath of the Darkhul King as having beat 'em up elements.) it uses a side-scrolling format (Note: A side-scrolling video game uses a side-view camera and has the player move a character left or right across the screen.) and is divided into 16 levels throughout Sunnydale, California. These areas include a cemetery, an abandoned hospital, a college campus, a museum, a forest, city streets, and a temple. The player, as Buffy Summers, can progress through each level by jumping and double jumping over pits, swimming, or using ladders, ropes, and metal bars. While Buffy is the sole playable character, other characters from the television show Buffy the Vampire Slayer appear in cutscenes between levels, which use digitized stills from the series. Buffy's boyfriend Riley Finn appears in certain areas to provide weapons and health in the form of presents.

To complete an area, the player solves puzzles by locating switches to open a gate or turn off a hazard, such as a steam pipe, and pushing crates to reach higher platforms. They can also rescue hostages, who are portrayed as men in red shirts. Obstacles include pendulums, falling rocks, unstable platforms, electrified water, and pits with spikes. In certain areas, the player must punch or kick down walls to continue. The game can be adjusted to a higher difficulty level, which has players enter the level in different areas and changes puzzle solutions.

Throughout Wrath of the Darkhul King, there are five types of enemies: male and female vampires, two species of demons, and the Gentlemen's minions. (Note: Introduced in "Hush"—an episode in Buffy the Vampire Slayer's fourth season—the Gentlemen are demons who steal people's voices and cut out their hearts. Portrayed as deformed and in straitjackets, the Gentlemen's minions assist their masters in more physical activities such as restraining their victims and fighting.) During the game, the player encounters four bosses, which are more powerful types of opponents; they are a vampire leader, the supersoldier Adam, (Note: The big bad of Buffy the Vampire Slayer's fourth season, Adam is a human-demon cyborg. The character refers to himself as a "bio-mechanical demonoid".) the demonic Gentlemen, and the Darkhul King. Buffy can punch, kick, and perform combos against an enemy and block attacks. Enemies can be thrown off screen and through benches or kicked off ledges, and objects in the environment can be used to hurt bosses. The player is not required to defeat enemies who can be avoided by jumping over them.

The player can find and use 16 types of weapons, including stakes, daggers, torches, throwing axes, crossbows, vials of holy water, flamethrowers, laser rifles, and the Glove of Myhnegon. (Note: First shown in the season three episode "Revelations", the Glove of Myhnegon is a magical gauntlet that allows its user to manipulate electricity.) Each weapon can only be used a limited number of times. Ranged weapons stun enemies while only melee weapons and physical attacks can defeat them. Vampires are primarily killed with stakes, but the player can also eliminate them by destroying rooftops to expose them to sunlight. Certain areas require the player to use a specific weapon, such as the crossbow or throwing axe, to proceed further. Weapons are accessible via an inventory screen, and they can be modified, such as combining a torch and a dagger to make a flaming dagger.

== Plot ==
Set in Buffy the Vampire Slayer's fourth season, (Note: Critics described Wrath of the Darkhul King as set in the fourth season. In GameZone, jkdmedia wrote that this was established by showing Buffy was still dating Riley and battling against Adam. John Scalzo for UGO Networks believed the game takes place "a few weeks" following the episode "Hush".) Wrath of the Darkhul King follows Buffy Summers, a Slayer destined to fight vampires, demons, and other supernatural entities. The game focuses on the Darkhul King—a demonic warlord who ruled the Earth for over 500 years before the sorceress Elnara trapped him in his own dimension—as its main antagonist. The Darkhul King raised an undead army and invaded Earth with the power of the Sceptor of Thelios, which was hidden after Elnara used it to banish him.

Buffy patrols Sunnydale after her Watcher, Rupert Giles, notifies her of a rise in demonic activity. While starting an extra credit assignment at a local museum's Amelia Earhart exhibit, she is interrupted when a demon steals a talisman. As Buffy continues her patrols, her allies—Giles, Willow Rosenberg, Xander Harris, and Anya Jenkins—research the demon. After Buffy discovers and clears out a nest of vampires, she notices they are more organized than usual, prompting Willow to question if a new big bad is behind their activities. During her patrols, Buffy encounters and kills the Gentlemen and their minions. Willow identifies the individuals who stole the talisman as Baruk demons, and Anya says that they typically work for a master. Looking for further clues, Buffy finds the Baruk demons excavating for the Scepter of Thelios. After the demons find the scepter, they use it in a ritual together with the talisman.

After killing one of the demons, Buffy receives assistance from Riley Finn in a fight against Adam. Buffy and Riley manage to escape after Adam is knocked out by falling rocks. Giles informs her that the Baruk demons are attempting to free the Darkhul King and initiate an apocalyptic event. He advises her to locate the demon's prison, the Temple of Shadows. After Buffy recovers the talisman and locates the temple's entrance, Giles believes the Darkhul King has already been freed and says she would need the Glove of Myhnegon to defeat him. Buffy finds it in the temple and beats the Darkhul King, who swears revenge against her. After destroying him, she realizes that her mission distracted her from completing her extra credit assignment.

== Development and release ==
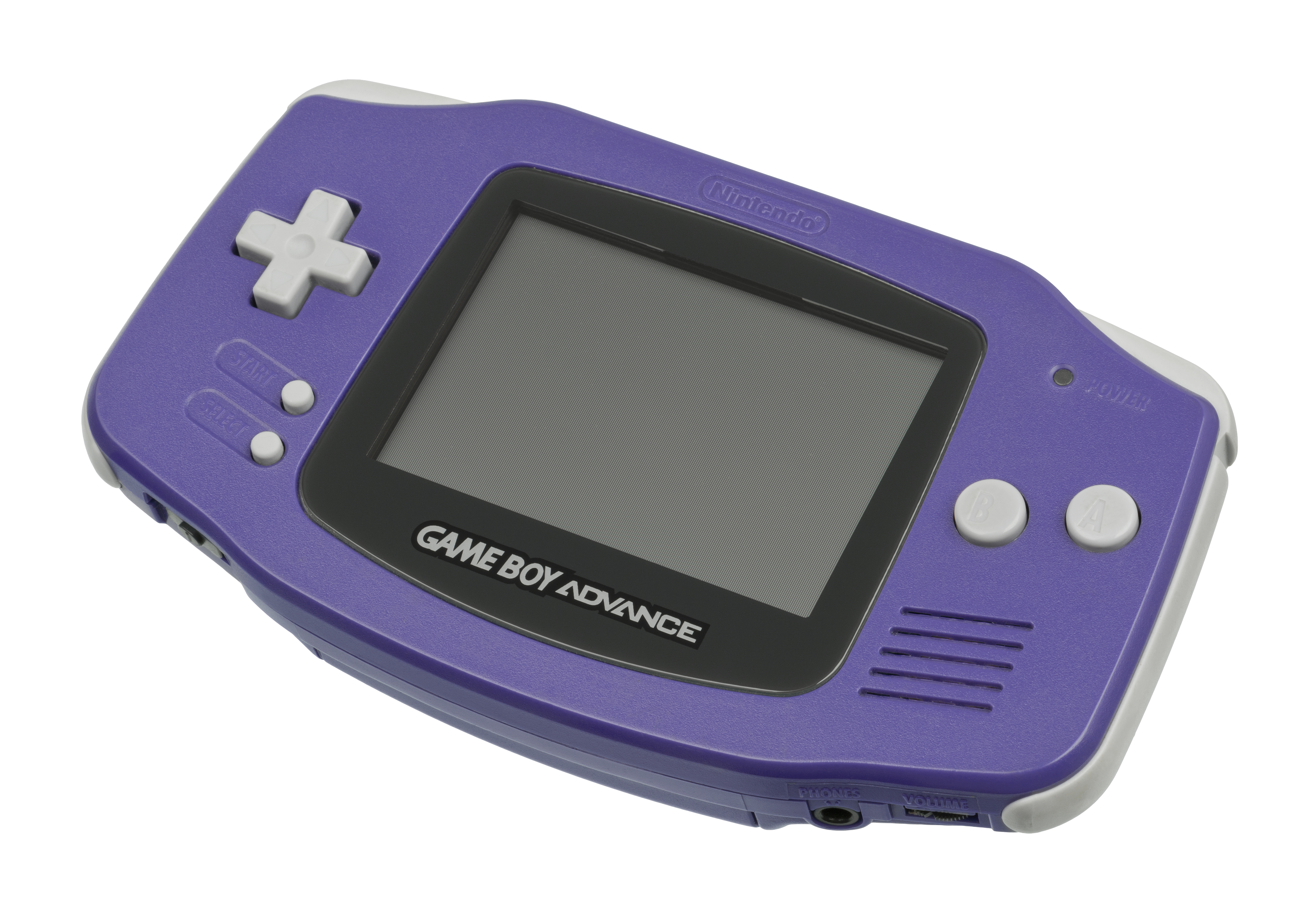
Wrath of the Darkhul King was released exclusively for the Game Boy Advance.

THQ and Fox Interactive announced development on Wrath of the Darkhul King in July 2002 as part of a Game Boy Advance (GBA) publishing agreement. Both companies had previously collaborated on the Game Boy Color game Buffy the Vampire Slayer in 2000. In his review for Wrath of the Darkhul King, The Guardian's Greg Howson described THQ's decision to release games based on licensed properties like Buffy the Vampire Slayer as "a sales necessity for non-Nintendo GBA games".

THQ chose the Japanese developer Natsume for Wrath of the Darkhul King; they had worked together since 1999, such as on Power Rangers video games for handheld consoles. Wrath of the Darkhul King was directed by Sosuke Yamazaki and produced by Iku Mizutani. Katsuo Inagaki was the lead programmer and was assisted by Masashi Ueda. The visual artists were Tomoki Hamuro, Masashi Kudo, and Chie Yoshida; they were directed by Sosuke Yamazaki. Iku Mizutani, Tetsuari Watanabe, and Kinuyo Ueda handled the sound design. (Note: In Wrath of the Darkhul King, Kinuyo Yamashita is credited as Kinuyo Ueda.)

When they started developing Wrath of the Darkhul King, Natsume first focused on the story and how to best represent Buffy as a character through a GBA game. Building on their reputation as a family-friendly company, Natsume targeted the game towards a younger audience and viewed Buffy as aspirational for children. Although Wrath of the Darkhul King was published after the series finale of Buffy the Vampire Slayer had aired, Natsume believed the game would still benefit from the show's continued popularity. It was the third of six Buffy the Vampire Slayer video games; like the other games based on the series, Wrath of the Darkhul King does not explain the characters' backstories or relationships, instead being marketed to the show's established fanbase.

Natsume designed Wrath of the Darkhul King as an action game and added puzzles to vary gameplay. Dialogue was limited to avoid gameplay interruptions. Natsume said that they could only have four bosses in the game because of rules placed on developing GBA games; when picking the boss enemies, they wanted characters who would leave a lasting impression on players and who could be defeated in unique ways. The company had difficulty adapting a television show into 2D computer graphics, struggling the most with programming the character models against a 2D background.

GameSpot published a preview of Wrath of the Darkhul King on June 4, 2003. The game was released on June 24 in North America and on June 27 in Europe. For the weeks of June 22, 2003 and June 29, 2003, it was in the top ten most-ordered games on Amazon.

== Critical reception ==
Reception

Aggregate score
| Aggregator | Score |
|---|---|
| Metacritic | 44/100 |

Review scores
| Publication | Score |
|---|---|
| AllGame | 2/5 |
| Computer and Video Games | 6/10 |
| Game Informer | 4.25/10 |
| GameSpot | 3.8/10 |
| GameSpy | 1/5 |
| GameZone | 5.9/10 |
| IGN | 4/10 |
| NGC Magazine | 21/100 |
| X-Play | 2/5 |

According to review aggregator website Metacritic, Wrath of the Darkhul King received "generally unfavorable" reviews. The website calculated a weighted average score of 44 out of 100 from 16 critic reviews.

Reviewers criticized the game's controls as cumbersome and sluggish. IGN's Craig Harris felt that accessing the inventory screen was inconvenient and discouraged players from experimenting with weapons. In Nintendojo, Ed Griffiths questioned the choice of having players jump with the shoulder buttons, which he described as "too uncomfortable to use regularly". Scott Alan Marriott for AllGame and GameSpot's Frank Provo said the controls for navigating platforms were frustrating, particularly when precise movements or quick reactions were required.

Critics disliked the combat mechanics; many of them felt players would not be motivated to use combos or weapons as the game could be beaten with only basic kicks and punches. Harris pointed out collision detection issues, which resulted in attacks being off by a pixel and not working. In GameSpy, Zach Meston criticized the limited animations for Buffy's combat moves, saying it became repetitive even after the first level. Several reviewers were critical of how easily enemies could be avoided. Other critics enjoyed the combat, like Entertainment Weekly's Kimberley Reyes, who highlighted Buffy's ability to destroy rooftops to kill vampires as one of their favorite features.

The level design was criticized for relying on platformer clichés, such as pulling switches and pushing crates. Although Griffiths found the gameplay formulaic, he praised the levels as well-made, while a NGC Magazine reviewer compared them to something "pieced together by a five-year-old". Some critics felt that the levels were unclear, such as being uncertain about which areas were platforms and what caused damage. Provo criticized the placement of obstacles and platforms outside the player's field of vision, saying the ability to pan the screen would have solved this.

The graphics received mixed reviews from critics. Some reviewers viewed them as adequate. Griffiths described the style as typical for GBA games. Other reviewers were more negative; in Gaming Age, Alex Makar said it had "one of the blandest color palettes ever seen". Alternatively, Marriott praised the backgrounds as detailed and the character sprites as well-animated. Some reviewers enjoyed the graphic quality for the digitized cutscene stills, while others called them repetitive. The game's sound received negative reviews from some critics, who found it forgettable. Other reviewers praised the soundtrack as retro, such as comparing to the music in a Nintendo Entertainment System game and from the Castlevania series by Meston and Provo, respectively. (Note: Kinuyo Ueda, who was one of the composers for Wrath of the Darkhul King, worked on Castlevania, the first video game in the series of the same name.)

Retrospective reviews remained negative. In 2012, GameZone's jkdmedia praised the graphics and sound, but criticized the level design and controls as outweighing these positive aspects. Two years later, Javier Parrilla Ruiz placed Wrath of the Darkhul King on a HobbyConsolas list of the worst video games based on a television series. In 2017, SyFy Wire's Brittany Vincent found the gameplay to be generic and disliked the lack of "deep characterization or uniquely Buffy content" aside from the dialogue.
