= Arumana no Kiseki =

1987 video game

- Developer: Konami
- Publisher: Konami
- Composer: Kinuyo Yamashita
- Platform: Famicom Disk System
- Release: JP: August 11, 1987
- Genre: Platform game
- Mode: Single-player

Arumana no Kiseki (Note: Arumana no Kiseki (アルマナの奇(き)跡(せき)) is literally translated as "The Miracle of Arumana".) is a platform game by Konami for the Family Computer Disk System. It was released in Japan on August 11, 1987.

== Synopsis ==
A magic red jewel, known as the Arumana, is stolen from an unnamed village. A thief runs off with the jewel and turns the entire village into stone. In order to restore the village to its former glory, the game's hero (Kaito) must track down the thief and recover the stolen jewel.

== Gameplay ==
The protagonist uses a grappling hook to climb up to the platform. The "LIFE" meter, the "SCORE" counter and a range of weapons are displayed on the bottom of the screen.

The player takes the role of a hero named Kaito, who bears a resemblance to Indiana Jones, and must travel through six cavernous levels in search of the stolen jewel, Arumana. The player begins with thirty throwing knives as his weapon of attack. As Kaito ventures through the levels they can find various other weapons. These include bombs, a handgun, bolas, a crystal ball that destroys everything on screen, and mines. He must destroy various cave dwelling creatures as well as soldiers, who sometimes drop weapons.

Kaito's main source of transportation is a grappling hook. Besides just walking and jumping, like most platform games, he can use a grappling hook to reach platforms that are too high to reach normally. The grappling hook can only be launched diagonally and may not be used vertically.

The game itself is reminiscent to Indiana Jones and the Temple of Doom. The appearance of Kaito is not only nearly identical to the series' adventurer, but the game's cave environments and plot, which revolves around the main character recovering a jewel that grants life to a village, are similar to his explorations. The game also borrows heavily from an earlier Konami release, Roc 'N Rope, with the main character firing ropes at platforms to cross wide chasms.

== Bibliography ==
- Kalata, Kurt (2017). Hardcore Gaming 101 Presents: Contra and Other Konami Classics. ISBN 978-1546928034.
