= Power Blade 2 =

1992 video game

Power Blade 2 Captain Saver
- North American cover art
- Publisher: Taito
- Designer: Noriyasu Togakushi
- Programmers: Toshikazu Iwasa; Keiichi Yamada
- Artists: Keizō Katō; Noriyasu Togakushi
- Composer: Kinuyo Yamashita
- Platform: NES/Famicom
- Release: 1992
- Genre: Platform
- Mode: Single-player

Power Blade 2, known in Japan as Captain Saver (Note: Japanese: キャプテンセイバー, Hepburn: Kyaputen Seibā), is a 1992 platform game published by Taito for the Nintendo Entertainment System/Family Computer. It is the sequel to the game Power Blade.

== Summary and gameplay ==
Nova in the Patriot Suit

The game takes place in the year 2200 and follows NOVA, the protagonist from the first Power Blade game, as he sets out on a mission from the U.S. Department of Defense to destroy the Delta Foundation, who has created a new cyborg that can threaten global security if it falls into the wrong hands. Just as in Power Blade, this game is similar in gameplay to the Mega Man series in that the player has the freedom to select any stage to play. It also adds some new features also seen in the Mega Man series, such as the ability of the player to slide and a wide assortment of weaponry.

As in the first game, the title comes from a special power-up called the "Power Suit", which gives the player additional firepower capabilities.

The object of the game is to destroy the Delta Foundation. The player can choose the order of the first four levels/buildings before unlocking Area 5. The goal in each building is to destroy the boss in order to destroy the building. After the player defeats the Area 5 boss, the game proceeds to the final level.

One of the biggest changes to this game was the addition of four collectible power suits. Instead of finding a temporary power suit, the player can collect four powerful suits by defeating a mid level bosses. The four suits are the Newt Suit, which lets the player climb the ceiling and walls, the Wet Suit, which allows the player to swim, the Rocket Suit, which lets the player fly, and a defensive suit called the Patriot Suit.

== Plot ==
December 24, 2200; The Delta Foundation, a weapons research company, developed a new cyborg soldier. The U.S. President was told that if the government did not buy it within the week, they would sell it to another government, which would pose a threat if it fell into the hands of a hostile government. Nova is given a secret mission from the U.S. Department of Defense to destroy the Delta Foundation.

== Reception ==
Reception

Review score
Publication	Score
Electronic Gaming Monthly	6/10, 6/10, 5/10, 5/10 (GEN)

In Electronic Gaming Monthly, reviewers wanted further variety in gameplay to help the game stand out and questioned making a sequel to a game that felt was mediocre in the first place.
