= Buffy the Vampire Slayer (2000 video game) =

2000 beat 'em up game

- North American cover art
- Developer: GameBrains
- Publisher: THQ
- Designer: Brett Bibby
- Programmer: Brett Bibby
- Platform: Game Boy Color
- Release: NA: September 19, 2000; EU: November 10, 2000
- Genre: Beat 'em up
- Mode: Single-player

Buffy the Vampire Slayer is a 2000 beat 'em up game developed by GameBrains and published by THQ for the Game Boy Color. Based on the television show Buffy the Vampire Slayer, the game features Buffy Summers, who fights vampires, demons, and other supernatural entities as the Slayer. The player controls Buffy through eight side-scrolling levels, and gameplay centers on one-on-one fights with vampires. The game received negative reviews, with reviewers criticizing its gameplay and graphics.

== Gameplay ==
Buffy the Vampire Slayer is a side-scrolling beat 'em up game divided into eight levels, which include a mansion, a cemetery, and the Sunnydale zoo. The player controls Buffy Summers, a Slayer destined to fight vampires, demons, and other supernatural entities. Gameplay is focused on one-on-one fights with vampires. Although vampires are the game's only enemy type, there are six variations: tux, punk, disfigured, tribesman, Euro, and guardian. The player fights two master vampires as bosses: a Viking and a beast vampire. To defeat them, the player must knock them down and stake them through the heart. A game over occurs when Buffy loses all of her health. Along with attacking, the player can block an enemy's attack, throw them, and roll on the ground.

Levels do not include any obstacles or traps, and while they incorporate platforming, none of the falls are lethal. AllGame's Brett Alan Weiss described the jumping mechanic as "super leaps". The game does not have any collectible items or different weapons. The player can pick up small objects, like paint cans, to throw at a vampire, but they can only be used when an enemy is onscreen. Levels also have power-ups, such as soda cans that provide "super punches and kicks". Each level ends with a password which functions as the game's save points that allow players to replay the level. While Buffy is the game's only playable character, other Buffy the Vampire Slayer characters appear in cutscenes between levels.

== Plot ==
The game is set in the fourth season of the television show Buffy the Vampire Slayer.

== Development and release ==
Buffy the Vampire Slayer was developed by GameBrains and published by THQ. In March 2000, THQ announced the game as part of a partnership with Fox Interactive, setting it for a 2000 release. Both companies would collaborate for a second Buffy the Vampire Slayer video game in 2003, Buffy the Vampire Slayer: Wrath of the Darkhul King. A pre-alpha demo was displayed at E3 in May 2000, before the game's release on September 19, 2000, as a Game Boy Color exclusive. The game was not backward compatible with the Game Boy.

== Critical reception ==
Reception

Aggregate score
Aggregator	Score
GameRankings	39%

Review scores
Publication	Score
AllGame	1.5/5
Game Informer	2/10
IGN	2/10
Nintendo Power	6.5/10
Nintendojo	5/10
Tampa Bay Times	D+

Buffy the Vampire Slayer received negative reviews. Craig Harris of IGN called the game "an absolute annoyance and chore to play through" and criticized its repetitive gameplay and poor graphics. Ty Kris of Nintendojo criticized the game's controls and recommended against purchasing it.
