= Natsume Championship Wrestling =

1994 video game

- Developer: Natsume Co., Ltd.
- Publisher: Natsume Inc.
- Composers: Iku Mizutani; Kinuyo Yamashita; Hiroyuki Iwatsuki
- Platform: Super NES
- Release: Super NES: NA: June 1994
- Genres: Fighting, Sports (wrestling)
- Modes: Single-player, multiplayer

Natsume Championship Wrestling is a 1994 Super Nintendo Entertainment System video game that was released in North America.

This game is widely based on a conversion of Zen-Nippon Pro Wrestling Dash: Sekai Saikyō Tag (全日本プロレス’ 世界最強タッグ ダッシュ, Zen Nippon Puroresu Sekai Saikyō Taggu Dasshu; lit. "All Japan Pro Wrestling World's Strongest Tag Dash"), a Japanese video game for the Super Famicom based on the All Japan Pro Wrestling promotion. Players must become either the Triple Crown Champion or the Triple Crown Tag Team Champions and achieve the limits of professional wrestling.

Natsume Championship Wrestling was re-released via the Wii Virtual Console in 2011, the Wii U Virtual Console in 2014, and the Nintendo Classics service in July 2020.

== Summary ==
This game is an unlicensed wrestling game, lacking a license from a professional wrestling promotion like World Championship Wrestling or the World Wrestling Federation. The Japanese version, however, included a license from All Japan Pro Wrestling.

The player has a choice between an exhibition, a round-robin tournament, and a championship tournament. Players must choose between 12 wrestlers who have ten minutes to knock each other out. Each wrestlers has a very extensive set of moves depending on their situation in the ring. Every victory screen with have both wrestlers' taunts, the time of the match, and the condition that caused the victory. The championship tournament has three difficulty levels: easy, medium, and hard. Criticism for this game was mixed from very positive to very negative.

There are more than fifty moves to master and an intelligent AI offers up plenty of might for the player. Six levels of energy bars (in order from best to worst: blue, green, yellow, orange, red, black) and the ability to heal help to separate this game from the other wrestling games of that era. However, recovery time is increased when the player is severely hurt.
