= Omega Five =

2008 video game

- Developer: Natsume Co., Ltd.
- Publisher: Hudson Soft
- Director: Shunichi Taniguchi
- Producers: Peter Dassenko; KotoB
- Designer: Tengo Project
- Programmer: KotoB
- Artist: Shunichi Taniguchi
- Composer: Hiroyuki Iwatsuki
- Platform: Xbox 360 (XBLA)
- Release: January 9, 2008
- Genre: Scrolling shooter
- Modes: Single-player, multiplayer

Omega Five (or Omega 5) is a horizontally scrolling shooter developed by Natsume Co., Ltd., more specifically an internal team named Tengo Project, and published by Hudson Soft for the Xbox 360 via Xbox Live Arcade. Hudson released the game on January 9, 2008. Various Japanese sites including Famitsu had listed the game as also heading to the Nintendo 3DS in Spring 2011. However, the 3DS port was canceled shortly following Konami's acquisition of Hudson, along with the company's other planned 3DS titles.

Omega Five features four selectable flying characters shooting enemies in a horizontally scrolling environment, with enemies emerging from the 3D background as well as screen edges, using both ranged and melee attacks. Each character can pick up icons to choose from one of three attack types, A, B, or C, and each weapon can be upgraded three times.

== Characters ==
- Ruby is a lingerie-clad female with three attacks, as well as a satellite that can lock on to enemies and damage them. In addition, Ruby will auto-aim at an enemy the satellite has latched to. Her A-type weapon is Vulcan Cannon, gaining power and spread with upgrades. B-type is Laser Beam, which at full power will reflect off surfaces, allowing it to hit around corners. C-Type is Lightning Gun, which at top strength shoots off sparks that damage nearby enemies as well as the target.
- Tempest is a brawny four-armed alien, though he only carries a weapon in one hand. Instead of a satellite, he has an alternate attack for each of his weapons. Tempest's weapons eschew typical shoot 'em up weapons like vulcan/laser/missiles; instead they provide one of Omega Five's most novel touches. A-type is Volcanic Fire, a flamethrower that gains power and length when powered up. Its alternate attack is a lock-on that will allow it to curve around obstacles to hit the enemy. B-type is Corrosive Acid, which resembles a fire hose, and can be changed between a tight flow and a wide spout. C-Type is Molten Metal, which bursts in arcs causing heavy damage. For its alternate attack, Tempest spins and fires homing bursts from all four arms at once. In addition to his unique alien weaponry, Tempest features a bullet reflecting shield. As bullets approach him, the shield slows them and turns them green. If the player stops firing briefly, all the slowed bullets reflect back at the enemy.
- R.A.D. becomes selectable by beating the game with Ruby, and she is basically Ruby's faster twin. Although her movement is faster than Ruby, her aiming is slower. Also, when her satellite locks on to enemies, R.A.D. is free to attack other foes instead of being locked on.
- Sensei is unlocked by beating the game with Tempest. He is a skinny old samurai riding a flying sled with his warrior dog Rikimaru. Rather than carrying a gun, Sensei swings a sword in whatever direction the player presses. This attack is probably the most potent in the game - besides dealing great damage to enemies, it can hit through walls, and it destroys bullets fired at the player. The drawback is that Sensei must be close to enemies to attack them, but the ferocity of his sword makes up for it. For his alternate attack, Rikimaru flies off and latches onto enemies, and Sensei switches to throwing projectiles that home in on Rikimaru's target. Weapon A is a bomb, weapon B consists of throwing knives, and weapon C is a shuriken. Also, by spinning the aiming stick in a quick circle, Sensei will swing his sword in a circle and hit everything around him.
- Rikimaru is the "fifth" warrior of the Omega Five.

== Special Attacks ==
- Dimensional Field - hitting right bumper on the 360 controller enables Dimensional Field, where the player temporarily enters another dimension and can move freely without being hit. It uses a small amount of life, and acts as an escape when the player is overwhelmed.
- Ultimate Burst - hitting the left trigger releases Ultimate Burst, a bomb that destroys all minor enemies onscreen and greatly damages larger ones. The player gains this ability by collecting p-chips, tiny flying triangles left by defeated enemies. 80 chips equal one Burst, and up to three Bursts can be stored.

== Audio ==
The original score for Omega Five was composed by long-running Natsume employee Hiroyuki Iwatsuki. Most tracks include two versions: an original theme and a retro remix. The latter category of songs was meant to simulate the electronic sound effects of 16-bit videogames and are played during the Retro Mode. An album release for the game had not been planned, until the idea was suggested by game composer Manabu Namiki after listening to the soundtrack prior to the release.

Omega Five sound track (オメガファイブ サウンドトラック) was published by the Sweeprecord label on March 19, 2008 under the catalog number SRIN-1041. In addition to the original and retro themes, the album included arranged tracks by the members of Super Sweep. The album includes the participation of Shinji Hosoe, Ayako Saso, Hiroto Saito, Yousuke Yasui and Takanori Sato. Iwatsuki also provided an arrangement of his own ending theme "Road to the future."

== Reception ==
Reception

Aggregate score
Aggregator	Score
Metacritic	72/100

Review scores
Publication	Score
1Up.com	D+
Destructoid	7.5/10
Edge	6/10
Eurogamer	7/10
GameDaily	8/10
GamePro	2.5/5
GameSpot	7/10
GameZone	7.3/10
IGN	(UK) 8.3/10 (US) 7.6/10
Official Xbox Magazine (US)	7/10
Retro Gamer	91%
TeamXbox	6.5/10
411Mania	8.3/10

The game received "mixed or average reviews" according to the review aggregation website Metacritic. IGN called it "one of the prettiest games on 360." Eurogamer criticized the game's "overly fussy control scheme", but said it was "technically the most impressive exclusive XBLA title." TeamXbox praised "pure, old-school, side-scrolling action wrapped up in a gorgeous visual package" but added, "if you're not a hard-core shooting fan or if you like a little extra substance with your video-game meal, Omega Five will likely leaving you with an unfilled appetite and hungry for more." 1Up.com published the most disparaging review, stating, "it seems to rely more on fancy effects than challenging fun." Official Xbox Magazine gave it an above-average review over a month before its release date.

== See also ==
- Aegis Wing
