= Finalizer (video game) =

1985 video game

- Developer: Konami
- Publisher: Konami
- Programmer: Hitoshi Akamatsu
- Platform: Arcade
- Release: JP: December 1985
- Genre: Vertically scrolling shooter
- Modes: Single-player, multiplayer

Finalizer (Note: Japanese: ファイナライザー, Hepburn: Fainaraizā) is a 1985 vertically scrolling shooter video game developed and published by Konami for arcades. It was only released in Japan in December 1985. Hamster Corporation released the game as part of their Arcade Archives series for the Nintendo Switch and PlayStation 4 in August 2024.

== Gameplay ==
Gameplay screenshot

Finalizer is a vertical-scrolling shooter game where the player controls a mecha who defeats enemies while flying above American airspace. It starts as a fighter jet, with players able to acquire increasingly powerful gear and weapons to power up.

== Reception ==
In Japan, Game Machine listed Finalizer in their January 15, 1986, issue as being the fourth most-successful table arcade unit of the month.

Micom BASIC Magazine writer Akira Yamashita speculated that the game's idea was possibly arranged into Knightmare (1986).
