= Dragon Scroll =

1987 video game

- Cover art
- Developer(s): Konami
- Publisher(s): Konami
- Composer(s): Kouji Murata
- Platform(s): Family Computer
- Release: JP: December 4, 1987
- Genre(s): Action role-playing game
- Mode(s): Single-player

Dragon Scroll (ドラゴンスクロール 甦りし魔竜, lit. "The Rebirth of the Evil Dragon") is a 1987 video game that was released exclusively in Japan for the Family Computer.

== Story ==
The player is fighting one of the minor enemies in this video game.

It was an age of magic, in which there existed two factions: Black Mages, who worshipped the three-headed Chrome Dragon, and White Mages, who worshipped the glimmering Gold Dragon. Their conflicts over territory and ideals brought about countless wars. The God Narume knew he must stop the fighting, so he put the Chrome Dragon to sleep in the mountains, and the Gold Dragon to sleep in the desert. He then took magic away from the mages, sealing up the eight Magic Books and hiding them in the sacred desert tower.

Hundreds of years passed after Narume erased magic from the world. The people lived in peace, and villages and towns prospered. However, there were also those who would do wrong to gain wealth. Enter the three greedy thieves: Safra, Kakai, and Unasu. One day, as they were being chased down for some evil deed, they became lost in the desert. After walking and walking, they stumbled upon the sacred tower and discovered the hidden Magic Books. Thinking they could sell them for a pretty penny, the three split the books amongst themselves and each went his own way. With the Magic Books gone, the Chrome Dragon awoke from its eternal slumber, determined to plunge the world into a second age of dark sorcery. So Narume infused the Gold Dragon with the spirit of justice, summoning him forth in the form of a hero named 'Feram'. And so, it is up to Feram to collect the Magic Books and return the Chrome Dragon to its slumber.

== The Two Dragons ==
=== Gold Dragon ===
The dragon worshipped by White Mages. It likes high places, and lives in a house made of stone. Personality-wise, it is fair, virtuous, and peace-loving. It can take many forms, including those of humans and animals. It also an unnaturally high intelligence and a vast knowledge of spells. The Gold Dragon has a body length of 18 metres (59 ft), and shoots Flame Breath and Energy Flame from its mouth. It has taken the form of the hero Feram on orders from the God Narume.

=== Chrome Dragon ===
Worshipped by Black Mages, the Chrome Dragon despises all good beings and loves cruelty. The ruler of Hell, it has three heads, each with a different attack. One spits flame, the other two spit explosives. Body length of 40 metres (130 ft). The only way to return the Chrome Dragon to its slumber is to pierce its very heart.

== Gameplay ==
The game is non-linear and operates almost like a sandbox game. Many video games helped to influence this video game, including The Legend of Zelda. A large video game world helps to define the complexity of the gameplay. However, most puzzles are impossible for non-Japanese speakers to solve,

== Development ==
A fan-made translation patch has been made available by King Mike Translations in 2008.

== See also ==
- Dragon Spirit: The New Legend, a game with a similar theme
- Dragon Buster, another game with a similar theme
