= Pocky & Rocky =

- Genre: Scrolling shooter
- Developers: Taito, Natsume Atari, Altron, Tengo Project
- Publishers: Taito, Natsume Atari, Natsume Inc., Altron
- Platforms: Arcade, Super NES, Game Boy Advance, Nintendo Switch, PlayStation 4, Windows, Xbox Series X/S
- First release: Kiki Kaikai; September 18, 1986
- Latest release: Pocky & Rocky Reshrined; April 21, 2022

Pocky & Rocky, known in Japan as Kiki Kaikai (奇々怪界; lit. "Mysterious Ghost World"), is a scrolling shooter video game series originating with the 1986 arcade game Kiki Kaikai by Taito. The game was adapted into a series of home console games mainly developed and published by Natsume which were titled Pocky & Rocky in the West. The games follow the adventures of a young Shinto shrine maiden, Pocky, and her tanuki companion, Rocky, as they fight against monsters from Japanese mythology.

== Overview ==
=== Common elements ===
The Pocky & Rocky games are scrolling shooter games. They star Pocky, a young Shinto shrine maiden, and her tanuki companion Rocky as they fight a variety of monsters. The games pull heavily from Japanese mythology, featuring many Japanese legendary creatures. Pocky is typically equipped with ofuda and gohei, which she uses to battle enemies and progress through the environments.

=== History ===
The first game in the series, Kiki Kaikai, was developed and published by Taito in Japanese arcades in 1986. Home ports were also released in Japan for the MSX2, Famicom Disk System, and PC Engine. The game would remain exclusive to Japan until a 2003 mobile port. Ports of the game have also since been released worldwide in various Taito arcade compilations, as well as through Arcade Archives.

Taito licensed the brand to Natsume in the early 1990s, who developed two new games in the series for the Super Nintendo. Natsume retitled the game for an international release, giving them the names Pocky & Rocky (1992) and Pocky & Rocky 2 (1994). Altron developed and published Pocky & Rocky with Becky for the Game Boy Advance in 2001.

Japanese developer Starfish SD was developing a Pocky & Rocky game for the PlayStation 2, tentatively titled Kiki Kaikai 2, but it was cancelled in 2007 after Taito pulled the series licensing. A representative of Starfish SD explained that Taito "had some issues with us and we had to let the title go." The company reworked their assets into an original game, originally titled Kiki Kai World. The game was finally released as Heavenly Guardian in North America and Legend of Sayuki in Europe. It was released for the Wii in 2007 and PlayStation 2 in 2008.

Pocky & Rocky Reshrined, known in Japan as Kiki Kaikai: Kuro Manto no Nazo (奇々怪界 黒マントの謎), released for the PlayStation 4 and Nintendo Switch in 2022. A Windows port was released in February 2023. A port for Xbox Series X/S was also released in December 2023. The game was developed by Tengo Project, which previously developed Wild Guns Reloaded (2016) and The Ninja Saviors: Return of the Warriors (2019). The team consisted of people who had worked on the first Pocky & Rocky game by Natsume for the Super NES. After being defeated at the end of Pocky & Rocky, Black Mantle travels back in time to get revenge. The game features a mix of revamped stages from Pocky & Rocky with original stages. As of July 2022, the game had sold over 100,000 copies.

== Games ==
Year	Title	Original platform	Developer	Publisher
1986	Kiki Kaikai	Arcade	Taito	Taito
1992	Pocky & Rocky	Super NES	Natsume Co., Ltd.	Natsume
1994	Pocky & Rocky 2	Super NES	Natsume Co., Ltd.	Natsume, Ocean Software
2001	Pocky & Rocky with Becky	Game Boy Advance	Altron	Altron, Natsume
2022	Pocky & Rocky Reshrined	Nintendo Switch, PlayStation 4, Windows, Xbox Series X/S	Tengo Project	Natsume Atari
