= Pocky & Rocky 2 =

1994 video game

- PAL cover art
- Developer: Natsume Co., Ltd.
- Publishers: JP: Natsume Co., Ltd.; NA: Natsume Inc.; PAL: Ocean Software
- Composers: Hiroyuki Iwatsuki; Kinuyo Yamashita; Haruo Ohashi; Asuka Yamao
- Series: Pocky & Rocky
- Platform: Super NES
- Release: JP: June 17, 1994; NA: November 1994; PAL: April 1995; JP: August 1, 1998; (Nintendo Power)
- Genre: Shoot 'em up
- Modes: Single-player, multiplayer

Pocky & Rocky 2, released in Japan as Kiki Kaikai: Tsukiyo Soushi (奇々怪界 月夜草子; "Mysterious Ghost World: A Moonlit Night"), is a shoot 'em up video game developed and published by Natsume Co., Ltd. in Japan, published by Natsume Inc. in North America, and published in PAL regions by Ocean Software for the Super NES video game console. It is the sequel to Pocky & Rocky.

== Gameplay ==
Gameplay screenshot

The game is played in a top-down view, featuring many elements from classic shoot 'em up games but giving the player free eight-directional movement. Player one controls the main protagonist, Pocky, who attacks by throwing ofuda talismans (referred to as "cards" in English versions). Pocky can pick up items to improve her attack power and new clothes to protect herself from damage, as well as throw player 2's character and use magic. Player 2 assumes a supporting role as one of Pocky's friends each possessing a unique attack and unlimited lives. If there is no second player, the supporting character will be CPU-controlled.

Pocky can use Player 2's character as a utility in various ways. Using "magic", she can force herself into her partner's mind and control their body for a short time, enabling unique abilities depending on who she possesses. Additionally, she can throw her partner at enemies to attack, doing massive damage to the enemy but temporarily killing the thrown character. This exploitation of player 2 is a departure from the previous game, in which player 1 and player 2 had similar powers and were equally valuable.

== Reception ==
Reception

Review scores
Publication	Score
Computer and Video Games	84/100, 86/100
Famitsu	7/10, 7/10, 7/10, 6/10
GamesMaster	81%
Jeuxvideo.com	18/20
Joypad	89%
M! Games	75%
Mega Fun	76%
Official Nintendo Magazine	87/100
Player One	80%
Super Play	79%
Total!	(UK) 79/100 (DE) 2
Video Games (DE)	73%
Dengeki Super Famicom	6/10, 7/10, 8/10, 7/10
Play Time	77/100
Super Gamer	83/100
Super Power	78/100
Top Consoles	17/20
VideoGames	9/10

According to Famitsu, Pocky & Rocky 2 sold 4,304 copies during its lifetime in Japan. The game received a 21.6/30 score in a readers' poll conducted by Super Famicom Magazine. It also received generally favorable reviews from critics.

Electronic Gaming Monthly's four editors praised the additional characters with unique abilities, the graphics, and the gameplay design, but disliked the fact that the other characters act as mere subordinates to Pocky. GamePro's Toxic Tommy commended the additional characters with the new strategy they add, the visuals, particularly minute details such as the animals and items, and the cute design.

VideoGames selected as a runner-up for the Best Adventure Game award. IGN ranked the game 73rd on its "Top 100 SNES Games of All Time."
