= Shalom: Knightmare III =

1987 video game

- Developer: Konami
- Publisher: Konami
- Series: Knightmare
- Platform: MSX
- Release: JP: December 23, 1987
- Genre: Adventure
- Mode: Single-player

Shalom: Knightmare III (Note: Japanese: シャロム 魔城伝説III 完結編, Hepburn: Sharomu: Majō Densetsu III - Kanketsu-hen; lit. "Shalom: Demon Castle Legend - Final Chapter" or "Shalom: Legend of the Devil Castle - Final Chapter") is a 1987 adventure video game developed and published by Konami for the MSX home computer. It was re-released digitally for Microsoft Windows. It is the third and final entry in the Knightmare trilogy. Set a century after the events of The Maze of Galious, the plot follows a Japanese high school student teleported into the Grecian Kingdom who must prevent the resurrection of the ancient demon lord Gog. Gameplay revolves around interaction with characters and exploration, while taking part in battles against enemies and bosses. The game was created by the MSX division at Konami under the management of Shigeru Fukutake. The process of making original titles for the platform revolved around the person who came up with the characters. Development proceeded with a team of four or five members, lasting somewhere between four and six months. It received a mixed reception from contemporary critics and retrospective commentators.

== Gameplay ==
Gameplay screenshot.

Shalom: Knightmare III is an adventure game.

== Development and release ==
Shalom: Knightmare III was developed by the MSX division at Konami under the management of Shigeru Fukutake, who revealed its creation process in a 1988 interview with the Japanese publication Micom BASIC Magazine. Fukutate explained that the staffer who came up with the characters was in charge of designing and facilitating the development of the project, as the process of making original titles for the MSX revolved around the person who came up with the characters being assigned to do both planning and the story. Fukutate further explained that the planner would then lead a team of four or five members to proceed with development, which would last somewhere between four and six months. The game was published for the MSX exclusively in Japan by Konami on December 23, 1987. Its ending theme was featured alongside music tracks from other Koanmi games in a compilation album titled Konami Ending Collection, distributed in Japan by King Records in 1991. Although it was not officially released outside Japan, English and Portuguese fan translations exist. It was re-released in digital form for Microsoft Windows through D4 Enterprise's Project EGG service on January 26, 2016.

== Reception ==
Reception

Review scores
Publication	Score
MSX Gids	2/5
MSX Magazine (JP)	5/5

Shalom: Knightmare III garnered mixed reception from contemporary critics and retrospective commentators.
