= Surprise Attack (video game) =

1990 video game

- Arcade flyer
- Developer: Konami
- Publisher: Konami
- Director: Hitoshi Akamatsu
- Platform: Arcade
- Release: JP: October 1990; NA: 1990
- Genre: Run and gun
- Modes: Single-player, multiplayer

Surprise Attack (Note: Japanese: サプライズアタック, Hepburn: Sapuraizu Atakku) is a 1990 run and gun video game developed and published by Konami for arcades. It was released in Japan in August 1990 and Europe the same year. It was directed by Hitoshi Akamatsu, creator of the Castlevania series. Hamster Corporation released the game as part of their Arcade Archives series for the Nintendo Switch and PlayStation 4 in March 2024.

== Gameplay ==
The player controls a special task force agent named John Ryan who aims to stop the terrorist organization Black Dawn. John must shoot enemies and navigate various levels until he retrieves and defuses all bombs. Unique to the game, the player can manipulate gravity to walk on either the ceiling or the floor, allowing the player to shoot enemies standing on either side without relying on constant jumping. A boss character must be defeated after each match, which leads to a quiz on science fiction topics that grants extra marks when correct.
