= Asterix (arcade game) =

1992 video game

- Japanese arcade flyer
- Developer: Konami
- Publisher: Konami
- Director: Masaaki Kukino
- Designer: Hideto Murata (hardware)
- Programmers: Hitoshi Akamatsu; Yuko Ito
- Artists: Masaaki Kukino; S. Wada; Tetsu Akasaka; T. Akiyama; Naoki Sato
- Composers: Mutsuhiko Izumi; Mariko Egawa; Michiru Yamane; Junya Nakano; Ayako Nishigaki
- Platform: Arcade
- Release: 1992
- Genre: Beat 'em up
- Modes: Single-player, multiplayer
- Arcade system: Main CPU: 68000 (@ 12 MHz); Sound CPU: Z80 (@ 8 MHz); Sound Chips: YM2151 (@ 4 MHz), K053260

Asterix (Japanese: アステリクス, Hepburn: Asuterikusu) is a horizontal-scrolling beat'em up arcade game released in 1992 by Konami. It is based on the French comic series Asterix and Obelix. The player fights as either Asterix the Gaul or his best friend, Obelix, as they take on the 'might' of the oppressive Roman Empire. Asterix includes a variety of humorous fighting moves, which are demonstrated in the game's attract mode. The artwork and feel of Asterix remains true to its French source material, and the game's many humorous touches (such as the way defeated Legionnaires crawl away) will be instantly familiar to fans of the comic-book and cartoon series. Bonus levels, such as the chariot race that awaits at the end of the first level, introduce different gameplay elements to provide a break from the fighting. Despite the game being developed by a Japanese company, all text is either in English or French.

== Characters ==
Two players can control Asterix and Obelix.

There are two characters the player can choose in this game. The first is small, agile Asterix and the second is big, strong Obelix. These two characters have their own unique animations, allowing them to defeat enemies in many different ways. Although Obelix is much stronger within the comic book stories, the powers of both characters in the game are equal.

The game can be completed using standard attacks such as punch, kick, clap, etc. or a special powerful attack "fast rotating arm". This special ability is done by holding the attack button for a short while until the character's face turns red. After that, the player must walk to an enemy and release the button. The enemy in this moment will fly up and after a short while drop down. This special attack is the only way to defeat the strongest bosses in the game.

After an enemy has been beaten enough to fall to the ground, he can be picked up for further abuse, depending on the character. For example, Asterix can pick up a soldier and twirl him above his head while Obelix instead smashes him against the ground in a back and forth motion. These attacks can lead to other enemies being knocked down if they get too close.

At certain points during stages, Dogmatix will bring out either a vial of Magic Potion for Asterix, or a roast boar for Obelix. Collecting these will grant brief invincibility, allowing Asterix and Obelix to rush about the screen and quickly dispatch enemies.

== Reception ==
Reception

Review score
Publication	Score
Game Zone	4/5
