= Pocky & Rocky with Becky =

2001 video game

- Developer: Altron
- Publishers: JP: Altron; NA: Natsume Inc.
- Series: Pocky & Rocky
- Platform: Game Boy Advance
- Release: JP: October 5, 2001; NA: October 18, 2002
- Genre: Shoot 'em up
- Mode: Single-player

Pocky & Rocky with Becky (Note: 奇々怪界あどばんす, Kiki Kaikai Advance) is a shoot 'em up video game for the Game Boy Advance handheld game console where the player may control either Pocky, Rocky, or Becky, the latter originating from the spin-off KiKi KaiKai: Dotou-hen, as they attempt to defeat a ghostly hydra who escaped his seal. The player character takes two hits to lose a life, but only one in Japan. While prior entries were developed by Taito, this game was developed and published by Altron in Japan, and published by Natsume Inc. in North America.

The game is mechanically similar to the arcade game KiKi KaiKai. It was later released on the Wii U's Virtual Console service. It has received mixed reception, with some critics criticizing it for its short length and lack of difficulty, while feeling that shoot 'em up fans would enjoy it.

== Gameplay ==
Gameplay screenshot

Pocky & Rocky with Becky is a shoot 'em up video game that allows people to choose between three different characters: Pocky, Rocky, and Becky. Pocky and Becky are both miko, while Rocky is a tanuki, each having different attacks. In the game, a ghostly hydra has returned, the seal Pocky set having been broken. Becky comes from the Pocky & Rocky spin-off KiKi KaiKai: Dotou-hen. They all are able to take two hits each in the North American version and one in the Japanese version, though the player is afforded infinite continues. Each level is one chapter, with the player progressing through the level until they meet and fight a boss at the end that can only be accessed by finding a key first. Throughout the chapters, enemies will attack the player, and power-ups can be picked up. Some items improve the character's power, improve their survival capabilities, or destroy enemies. Once the player has beaten the game, they are given a code to access a more challenging version of the game. This difficulty mode introduces new enemy types, more challenging boss battles, and new dialogue. The game tracks the player's best score, and rates the player's best score at the end of each chapter, though the game lacks a battery backup to save them between game sessions.

== Development and release ==
Pocky and Rocky with Becky was developed by Altron, whereas previous entries were developed by Taito. It was developed by to emulate the arcade game rather than the Super NES entries. Pocky & Rocky with Becky was exhibited at the 2001 Space World event. It released for the Game Boy Advance on October 5, 2001 in Japan. It was originally slated for release in spring 2002 in North America. It was later listed with an October 1, 2002 in the North America, but ultimately released on October 18, 2002. In the English localization, the character Miki-chan was changed to be named Becky. Additionally, they implemented a password system, as well as changing the number of hits the player character can take from one to two. It was later made available on the Wii U eShop in North America and Europe simultaneously on October 8, 2015.

== Reception ==
Reception

Aggregate score
Aggregator	Score
Metacritic	57/100 (GBA)

Review scores
Publication	Score
AllGame	2/5 (GBA)
GameSpot	5.7/10 (GBA)
Nintendo Life	5/10 (Wii U)

When it was presented at Space World, IT Media staff expressed excitement for a handheld Pocky & Rocky game. Since its release, it has received generally mixed reception. Nintendo Power staff enjoyed the game, praising its music and saying that it would be enjoyed by arcade fans. AllGame writer Scott Alan Marriott was critical of the game for being too short, as well as arguing that it was pointless to pursue top scores due to it not having battery backup to save them. Hardcore Gaming 101 writer Steven Barbato noted that its similarity to the arcade Pocky & Rocky may turn off some players, though people who enjoy the arcade version or who do not care about co-op gameplay may enjoy it. He criticized it for being too short and easy, but noted that the extra difficulty mode enhances its replay value. GameSpot writer Frank Provo felt that it was too short and half-baked for casual players to fully enjoy it, though felt that hardcore shooter fans may enjoy it.
