= Heavenly Guardian =

2007 video game

- Developer: Starfish SD
- Publishers: Wii & PlayStation 2: JP: Starfish SD; NA: UFO Interactive Games; EU: 505 Games; Nintendo Switch: JP: Joyfulstar; NA: Ninja Games Japan; EU: Ninja Games Japan; Microsoft Windows: WW: Joyfulstar
- Platforms: PlayStation 2, PlayStation Network, Wii, Nintendo Switch, Microsoft Windows
- Release: Wii: JP: December 20, 2007; NA: April 22, 2008; EU: December 5, 2008; PlayStation 2: NA: February 26, 2008; EU: June 27, 2008; JP: December 18, 2008; PlayStation Network: JP: July 17, 2013; NA: October 8, 2013; Nintendo Switch: JP: December 13, 2018; NA: March 28, 2019; EU: March 28, 2019; Microsoft Windows: WW: March 20, 2019
- Genre: Scrolling shooter
- Modes: Single-player, multiplayer

Heavenly Guardian, (Note: Known in Japan as Yukinko Daisenpuu ~Sayuki to Koyuki no Hie-Hie Daisoudou~ (雪ん娘大旋風～さゆきとこゆきのひえひえ大騒動～; translated on Starfish's site as "Snow Girls Winter Blast")) known in Europe as Legend of Sayuki, is a scrolling shooter game developed by Starfish SD. It was originally released on the Wii in 2007 and PlayStation 2 in 2008. The developer self-published the title in Japan, while UFO Interactive Games and 505 Games published the game in North America and Europe respectively. It was later released on the Nintendo Switch in 2018 and Windows and PlayStation 4 (only in Japan) in 2019 as Snow Battle Princess Sayuki. A physical PlayStation 4 version was released in Europe.

The game was originally planned to be an entry in Taito's Pocky & Rocky series, but due to legal issues with Square Enix, the game's title and characters were changed while maintaining the core gameplay.

== Story ==
The story is different in single and multi-player modes, but the gameplay remains identical.

In single player, the story centers around the snow goddess Sayuki's love for a boy who lives in a nearby village. Upon visiting the village one day, she learns that the boy has fallen under a curse, sleeping permanently. Sayuki then travels across the land with her pet snow rabbit, Toto, to find the ingredients for the cure to his curse.

In multiplayer, the story is about a beauty contest held by the Snow Goddess Tribe. Sayuki and her younger sister, Koyuki, decide to compete for first place. The contest is a trial race for the two sisters to destroy the most ghosts and collect the most snowballs in their path.

== Gameplay ==
Heavenly Guardian, like the Kiki KaiKai series, is a scrolling shooter where the player moves a character in any direction and fire projectiles at enemies. It can be played alone, or cooperatively with a second player controlling Sayuki's sister, Koyuki. In single-player, Sayuki is followed by Toto, her pet snow rabbit, who shoots freezing shots in the same direction Sayuki attacks.

Upon defeating bosses in the story mode, they can be rebattled in the Boss Attack mode.

The Wii version can only be played using both the Wii Remote and Nunchuk. Unlike the PS2 version, which only allows the player to fire the direction a character is facing, the Wii version offers the option to aim and fire with the Wii Remote's pointer. This can either be permanently on (called "FlameIN" on the option menu) or be switched on by holding the Z button on the Nunchuk. While aiming the player cannot use Toto's freezing shots as he acts as the cursor.

== Development ==
Heavenly Guardian was originally an intended GameCube and later Wii sequel to Taito's Kiki KaiKai series (better known as Pocky & Rocky outside Japan) called simply "Kiki KaiKai 2". The game was canceled, as Starfish SD lost the Kiki KaiKai license, but would later resurface as a Wii game entitled "Kiki Kai World". This version was mostly similar to the canceled Wii game, but with the main character's miko outfit recolored from red to blue. Instead of being a direct sequel to the original, it was more of a spiritual successor, as to avoid legal issues with Taito and its parent company, Square Enix.

To further separate the game from Kiki KaiKai, the graphics and theme of the game were completely redone, replacing the miko heroine with a snow goddess named Sayuki. When approached about the subject, a company spokesperson said "to make a long story short, Taito, who is now owned by Square [Enix], had some issues with us and we had to let the title go", implying that Square Enix was the reason behind the initial cancellation.

Although Starfish chose to only release a Wii version in Japan, UFO released a PS2 version in North America, due to having control over the release platforms in the region. 505 Games also released both versions in Europe.

== Reception ==
Although just a few magazines reviewed the game, Heavenly Guardian received poor ratings by the press. GameSpot reviewer Kevin VanOrd gave the PlayStation 2 version of the game a 3.0 out of 10.0 in his review, citing archaic mechanics and frustrating gameplay as negative aspects of the game. He closed his review with "don't be fooled by the promise of fun throwback gameplay. Heavenly Guardian may look to the past, but it is too bland and frustrating to evoke fond memories of 'the good old days'".

IGN editor Sam Bishop also reviewed both versions of the game, rating it with 4.0 out of 10.0, stating in his closing comments: "Heavenly Guardian is an affront to everything that games are now and were back in the day".
