= The Maze of Galious =

1987 video game

- Developer: Konami
- Publisher: Konami
- Director: Ryouhei Shogaki
- Designer: Ryouhei Shogaki
- Programmers: Masahiko Ozawa; Yutaka Haruki
- Artist: Chiaki Tanigaki
- Composer: Kazuhiko Uehara
- Series: Knightmare
- Platforms: MSX; Family Computer
- Release: MSX: JP: April 18, 1987; EU: 1987; Family Computer: JP: August 11, 1987
- Genres: Action-adventure, platform
- Mode: Single-player

The Maze of Galious (Note: Known as Majou Densetsu II: Gariusu no Meikyuu (Japanese: 魔城伝説II ガリウスの迷宮, Hepburn: Majō Densetsu Tsū: Gariusu no Meikyū; lit. "Demon Castle Legend II: The Maze of Galious" or "Legend of the Devil Castle II: The Maze of Galious") in Japanese.) is a 1987 action-adventure game developed and published by Konami for the MSX home computer. A reworked conversion was released for the Family Computer. Both versions were re-released digitally for Microsoft Windows. The second entry in the Knightmare trilogy, it follows the respective hero and former damsel in distress of the previous game, Popolon and Aphrodite, as they embark on a journey through Castle Greek to free their unborn child Pampas from the evil priest Galious. The player explores each map in search for items and power-ups to progress, while also fighting enemies and bosses.

The Maze of Galious was created by the MSX division at Konami under management of Shigeru Fukutake. The process of making original titles for the platform revolved around the person who came up with the characters. A team of seven members were responsible for its development, lasting somewhere between four and six months, with Ryouhei Shogaki being the project's lead designer. The game garnered a generally favorable reception from critics and retrospective commentators. It served as influence for La-Mulana (2006), while the game's exploration bits were utilized for Castlevania II: Simon's Quest. It was followed by Shalom: Knightmare III (1987). In the years since, fans have experimented with remaking and porting the title unofficially to other platforms.

== Gameplay ==
Gameplay screenshot of the MSX version.

The Maze of Galious is a platform-adventure game starring the warrior Popolon and his lover, Princess Aphrodite, as they embark on a journey through Castle Greek to free their unborn child Pampas from the evil priest Galious. Being able to control two characters means the player can switch between Popolon and Aphrodite, both of which have slightly different abilities: Popolon can push stones, open heavy doors and has a variable jumping height, while Aphrodite survives longer under water, can shoot more projectiles and has a fixed jumping height. The game's structure is similar to The Legend of Zelda; Castle Greek acts as the main overworld, where entrances to the ten "worlds" are hidden throughout.

The player explores each world map, collecting items, defeating enemies and bosses, and obtaining power-ups to progress further. Similar to metroidvania games, new areas can be accessed by acquiring new items. Each map also hosts three hidden items to aid Popolon and Aphrodite against a "Great Demon". In order to face a "Great Demon", the player must inspect a gravestone that reveals an incantation to invoke them at a boss room by typing their names. Some items are optional but others are mandatory such as the "Cross", which is needed to face against the final boss. Enemies can drop random items after their defeat, ranging from coins that can be spent in shops to upgrade the character's overall inventory, arrow stocks for projectile-based weapons, and keys to open locked doors.

There are several types of enemies, each with strengths and weaknesses; some monsters are immune to frontal attacks, while others are more vulnerable to fire and so on. The player can also kill enemies to fill an "experience" gauge, which replenishes a character's health when full. Another way to heal a character is entering a special room within the main overworld map, which contains a magic dust that can be turned into a fairy by standing at a certain spot. Should either character die, the other can visit a shrine and pay for resurrection. If both characters perish, the game is over, but the player can resume progress via passwords obtained from "Demeter's Shrine". Extra content is unlocked if the Game Master, Knightmare or Q*bert are inserted in the second cartridge slot available on most MSX machines.

== Development ==
The Maze of Galious was developed by the MSX division at Konami under management of Shigeru Fukutake, who revealed about the creation process in a 1988 interview with Japanese publication Micom BASIC Magazine. Fukutate explained that the staffer who came up with the characters was in charge of design and facilitating development of the project, as the process of making original titles for the MSX revolved around the person who came up with the characters being assigned to do both planning and the story. Fukutate further explained that the planner would then lead a team of four or five members to proceed with development, which would last somewhere between four and six months.

Seven staffers were responsible for the project: director and designer Ryouhei "Ryokun" Shogaki, programmers Masahiko "Mai" Ozawa and Yutaka "Hal" Haruki, artist Chiaki Tanigaki, composer Kazuhiko Uehara, and two members under the pseudonyms "Hipo" and "Tomoyo". Other people also collaborated in its development. Maze of Galious was the first game Uehara worked on after joining Konami in 1986 as sound designer; He would be responsible for creating the SCC sound chip, as well as working on Space Manbow and Metal Gear 2: Solid Snake. The team revealed in a 1987 article that they never decided upon the gender of Pampas (although it was later in the MSX sequel, Shalom, that Pampas would become a king, therefore being male), while an eleventh map was scrapped due to memory constrains.

== Release ==
Prior to launch, a game titled Majou Densetsu II: Poporon Gekitou Hen (Note: 魔城伝説II 〜ポポロン激闘編〜 (Majō Densetsu II ~Poporon Gekitō Hen~)) was scheduled to be published in 1987 by Konami for the PC-8801 and X1 home computers. The game was intended to be a vertical-scrolling shooter similar to Knightmare but with role-playing elements added. It was never released for unknown reasons despite being advertised and previewed in Japanese magazines. The Maze of Galious was first published for the MSX in Japan on April 18, 1987, and later in Europe of that year by Konami. A few months after the original release, a completely reworked conversion titled Majou Densetsu II: Daima Shikyou Gariusu (Note: 魔城伝説II 大魔司教ガリウス (Majō Densetsu II: Daima Shikyō Gariusu)) was released for the Family Computer exclusively in Japan by Konami on August 11, featuring changes such as improved visuals and redesigned maps.

Although it was not officially released outside Japan, an English fan translation for the Famicom version was released online. Both versions were first re-released in digital form for Microsoft Windows on the i-Revo store front. In 2006, the full soundtrack of the Famicom version was included as part of a compilation album titled Legend Of Game Music Consumer Box, distributed in Japan by Scitron. The MSX version was also re-released in digital form for Windows through D4 Enterprise's Project EGG service on March 24, 2015.

== Reception ==
Reception

Review scores
Publication	Score
Famitsu	27/40 (FC)
Tilt	8/20 (MSX)
Family Computer Magazine	19.79/30 (FC)
Input MSX	49/50 (MSX)
Micros MSX	17/20 (MSX)
MSX Gids	5/5 (MSX)
MSX Magazine (JP)	5/5 (MSX)

The Maze of Galious on MSX garnered a generally favorable reception from critics. The Japanese MSX Magazine praised its graphics, character sprites, soundtrack, and playability. An editor for MSX Gids shared similar thoughts, lauding the visuals, sound, and overall quality. MSX Computer Magazine compared the title with Vampire Killer due to its similar setup and game structure, but also found it more difficult than the original Knightmare. Regardless, the editor commended the varied graphical design, music and sound effects.

Spanish publication Input MSX also compared it with Vampire Killer but highlighted its variety of enemies and weapons, as well as the way each world are divided, while giving positive remarks to the imaginative and colorful graphical quality, character animations, and audio. Micros MSX's Yannick Gallois echoed a similar opinion about the audiovisual presentation. In contrast to most reviewers, Tilt's Mathieu Brisou felt that the game's execution was not on par, unfavorably comparing it with Knightmare in terms of visuals. Readers of Family Computer Magazine (Famimaga) voted to give the Family Computer version a 19.79 out of 30 score in a 1991 public poll. Famimaga found the Famicom version to be more fun compared to the MSX original.

Retrospective commentaries for The Maze of Galious have been equally favorable. MeriStation's David Pérez García and Francisco Alberto Serrano identified it as one of the best games for the MSX, noting the lack of slowdown and soundtrack. In 2014, HobbyConsolas identified Maze of Galious as one of the twenty best games for the MSX. IGN Spain's Jaume Esteve also regarded it as one of the ten best games by Konami for the MSX. Hardcore Gaming 101's Rob Russo disagreed, expressing that neither version of Galious were among Konami's best work. Russo stated that "compared to Falcom's Legacy of the Wizard, also released that year, they're downright dull. But there are just enough good ideas here to make you wish Konami took another crack at this incarnation of the Knightmare series."

== Legacy ==
The Maze of Galious, particularly the original MSX version, served as influence for La-Mulana (2006). Spanish developer Francisco Téllez de Meneses also cited the game as an influence for Unepic (2011). In addition, the exploration bits from the game were ultimately utilized for Castlevania II: Simon's Quest. In the years since, fans have experimented with remaking and porting the title unofficially to other platforms. In 2002, a remake based on the original MSX version for PCs was released online by the group Brain Games, featuring updated visuals and different graphic sets. In 2015, a conversion for the ColecoVision was announced to be in development by Opcode Games, requiring the Super Game Module expansion to run on the hardware. That same year, a port for the ZX Spectrum developed by Climacus and McNeil was released online. In 2022, a mod that supports the MSX2 hardware was released online by Víctor Martínez and David Madurga, which allows improved visuals by Toni Galvez and other changes.

During the Konami Action & Shooting Contest hosted by the Shueisha Game Creator’s Camp and Tokyo Game Show 2022, Takumi Naramura (the creator of La Mulana) won the rights from Konami to develop the game through the competition, a remake game titled Maze of Galious Remake is in development.
